= Electoral results for the Mining and Pastoral Region =

This is a list of electoral results for the Mining and Pastoral Region in Western Australian state elections from the region's creation in 1989 until the present.

Legislation to abolish the region, along with all other Western Australian electoral regions, was passed in November 2021, with the 2025 state election to use a single state-wide electorate of 37 members.

== Election results ==
=== 2021 ===
2021 Western Australian state election: Mining and Pastoral
| Party | Candidate | Votes | % | ±% |
|---|---|---|---|---|
| Quota | | 7,010 | | |
| Labor | 1. Stephen Dawson (elected 1); 2. Kyle McGinn (elected 2); 3. Peter Foster (elected 3); 4. Rosetta Sahanna (elected 4); 5. Kelvin Portland; 6. Bobby-Lee Field | 28,002 | 57.07 | +22.91 |
| Liberal | 1. Neil Thomson (elected 6); 2. Michael Huston; 3. Jodie Richardson; 4. Matt Blampey | 5,250 | 10.70 | −4.99 |
| National | 1. Nicholas Fardell; 2. Lionel Quartermaine; 3. Tony Crook; 4. Kieran Dart; 5. Mark Young; 6. Tessa Daly | 5,032 | 10.26 | −8.72 |
| Greens | 1. Kimberly Smith; 2. Giz Watson | 2,431 | 4.95 | −0.72 |
| Shooters, Fishers, Farmers | 1. Matt Priest; 2. Royce Normington; 3. Kingsley Smith | 1,705 | 3.48 | −1.67 |
| One Nation | 1. Robin Scott; 2. David Modolo | 1,490 | 3.04 | −10.66 |
| Legalise Cannabis | 1. James Brown; 2. Donald Watt | 1,277 | 2.60 | +2.60 |
| Western Australia | 1. Dave Grills; 2. Julie Matheson | 729 | 1.49 | +1.22 |
| Christians | 1. Jacky Young; 2. Ross Patterson | 582 | 1.19 | −0.32 |
| Liberals for Climate | 1. Curtis Greening; 2. Gavin McFerran | 552 | 1.13 | +0.10 |
| No Mandatory Vaccination | 1. Andrew Middleton; 2. Deborah Middleton | 526 | 1.07 | +1.07 |
| Animal Justice | 1. Emmarae Cole-Darby; 2. Scott Dunning | 398 | 0.81 | +0.81 |
| Liberal Democrats | 1. Robbie Parr; 2. Jake McCoull | 198 | 0.40 | −0.29 |
| Independent | 1. Tayla Squires; 2. Cameron Gardiner | 188 | 0.38 | +0.38 |
| Sustainable Australia | 1. Brian Mollan; 2. Anthony Park | 158 | 0.32 | +0.32 |
| WAxit | 1. Brenden Hatton; 2. Huw Grossmith | 116 | 0.24 | +0.10 |
| Great Australian | 1. Nathan Webb-Smith; 2. Laona Mullings | 113 | 0.23 | +0.23 |
| Daylight Saving | 1. Wilson Tucker (elected 5); 2. Janet Wilson | 98 | 0.20 | −0.30 |
| Independent | 1. Anthony Fels; 2. Van Son Le | 85 | 0.17 | +0.17 |
| Health Australia | 1. Teddy Craies; 2. Simon Martin | 82 | 0.17 | +0.17 |
| Independent | 1. Christine Kelly; 2. Noel McGinniss | 52 | 0.11 | +0.11 |
| Total formal votes | | 49,064 | 97.83 | +0.74 |
| Informal votes | | 1,088 | 2.17 | −0.74 |
| Turnout | | 50,152 | 72.00 | −15.20 |

=== 2017 ===
2017 Western Australian state election: Mining and Pastoral
| Party | Candidate | Votes | % | ±% |
|---|---|---|---|---|
| Quota | | 7,045 | | |
| Labor | 1. Stephen Dawson (elected 1); 2. Kyle McGinn (elected 4); 3. Peter Foster; 4. Christopher Mousley | 16,846 | 34.16 | +11.78 |
| National | 1. Jacqui Boydell (elected 2); 2. Dave Grills; 3. Gary Brown; 4. Judi Janes; 5. Adrian Hatwell; 6. Terry Fleeton | 9,356 | 18.97 | −8.98 |
| Liberal | 1. Ken Baston (elected 3); 2. Mark Lewis; 3. Barry Pound; 4. Jason Wells | 7,735 | 15.69 | −16.43 |
| One Nation | 1. Robin Scott (elected 5); 2. Justin Keating; 3. Janine Varley | 6,754 | 13.70 | +13.70 |
| Greens | 1. Robin Chapple (elected 6); 2. Timothy Oliver | 2,800 | 5.68 | −3.26 |
| Shooters, Fishers, Farmers | 1. Stefan Colagiuri; 2. Shane Aylmore; 3. Kingsley Smith | 2,539 | 5.15 | +1.44 |
| Christians | 1. Grahame Gould; 2. Jacky Young | 743 | 1.51 | −0.27 |
| Family First | 1. Ian Rose; 2. Bev Custers | 508 | 1.03 | −1.20 |
| Flux the System! | 1. Kai Shanks; 2. Melissa Taaffe | 505 | 1.02 | +1.02 |
| Liberal Democrats | 1. Jared Neaves; 2. Marko Vasev | 342 | 0.69 | +0.69 |
| Daylight Saving | 1. Amanda Klaj; 2. Joel Duffy | 246 | 0.50 | +0.50 |
| Fluoride Free WA | 1. Anne Porter; 2. David Bauer | 210 | 0.43 | +0.43 |
| Matheson for WA | 1. Sonya Matheson; 2. Paul Costanzo | 132 | 0.27 | +0.27 |
| Independent | 1. Paul Fitzgerald; 2. Nicholas Cukela | 121 | 0.25 | +0.25 |
| Independent Flux | 1. Atilla Ataman; 2. Tayla Stucke | 85 | 0.17 | +0.17 |
| Independent | Darby Renton | 72 | 0.15 | +0.15 |
| Independent Flux | 1. Abed Raouf; 2. Billy Amesz | 68 | 0.14 | +0.14 |
| Micro Business | 1. Natasha Rogers; 2. Pritam Patil | 65 | 0.13 | +0.13 |
| Independent | Julie Owen | 55 | 0.11 | +0.11 |
| Independent Flux | 1. Angela Hyde; 2. Greg Gandossini | 53 | 0.11 | +0.11 |
| Independent | 1. Keith Mader; 2. Royce Normington | 41 | 0.08 | +0.08 |
| Independent | 1. Arihia Henry; 2. Pete Francis | 35 | 0.07 | +0.07 |
| Total formal votes | | 49,311 | 97.52 | +0.23 |
| Informal votes | | 1,253 | 2.48 | −0.23 |
| Turnout | | 50,564 | 73.84 | −5.63 |

=== 2013 ===
2013 Western Australian state election: Mining and Pastoral
| Party | Candidate | Votes | % | ±% |
|---|---|---|---|---|
| Quota | | 8,164 | | |
| Liberal | 1. Ken Baston (elected 1); 2. Mark Lewis (elected 4); 3. Eden Coad; 4. Ross Wood; 5. Ross Beckett | 18,355 | 32.12 | +2.30 |
| National | 1. Jacqui Boydell (elected 2); 2. Dave Grills (elected 6); 3. John McCourt; 4. David Eagles; 5. Adrian Hatwell; 6. Cale Hill | 15,974 | 27.95 | +6.53 |
| Labor | 1. Stephen Dawson (elected 3); 2. Jim Murie; 3. Shane Hill; 4. Jon Ford; 5. Linda Morich; 6. Renee Portland | 12,789 | 22.38 | −11.72 |
| Greens | 1. Robin Chapple (elected 5); 2. Kado Muir | 5,107 | 8.94 | −0.01 |
| Shooters and Fishers | 1. John Parkes; 2. Stefan Colagiuri | 2,121 | 3.71 | +3.71 |
| Family First | 1. Ian Rose; 2. Cedric Harper | 1,273 | 2.23 | +0.58 |
| Christians | 1. Roger Mansell; 2. Mike Walsh | 1,016 | 1.78 | −0.09 |
| Independent | Frank Bertola | 511 | 0.89 | +0.89 |
| Total formal votes | | 57,146 | 97.30 | +0.26 |
| Informal votes | | 1,588 | 2.70 | −0.26 |
| Turnout | | 58,734 | 79.46 | +5.69 |

=== 2008 ===
2008 Western Australian state election: Mining and Pastoral
| Party | Candidate | Votes | % | ±% |
|---|---|---|---|---|
| Quota | | 7,773 | | |
| Labor | 1. Jon Ford (elected 1); 2. Helen Bullock (elected 4); 3. Jim Murie; 4. Jodie Lynch; 5. Mike Anderton; 6. Terry Healy | 18,554 | 34.10 | −6.4 |
| Liberal | 1. Norman Moore (elected 2); 2. Ken Baston (elected 5); 3. Mark Lewis; 4. Isabella Scott; 5. Ross Wood; 6. Alan Dungey | 16,227 | 29.82 | −7.5 |
| National | 1. Wendy Duncan (elected 3); 2. Dave Grills; 3. Alan Keeling; 4. Garry McGlinn | 11,656 | 21.42 | +18.6 |
| Greens | 1. Robin Chapple (elected 6); 2. Kate Davis | 4,869 | 8.95 | +1.7 |
| Christian Democrats | 1. Roger Mansell; 2. Peter Watt | 1,018 | 1.87 | +0.3 |
| Family First | David Kidd | 896 | 1.65 | +1.4 |
| One Nation | Gavin Ness | 528 | 0.97 | −1.1 |
| Daylight Savings | Pat Cunneen | 392 | 0.72 | +0.72 |
| New Country | David Larsen | 160 | 0.29 | +0.3 |
| Citizens Electoral Council | 1. Lorraine Thomas; 2. Orm Girvan | 109 | 0.20 | 0.0 |
| Total formal votes | | 54,409 | 97.04 | 0.0 |
| Informal votes | | 1,661 | 2.96 | 0.0 |
| Turnout | | 56,070 | 73.77 | −1.9 |

=== 2005 ===
2005 Western Australian state election: Mining and Pastoral
| Party | Candidate | Votes | % | ±% |
|---|---|---|---|---|
| Quota | | 8,351 | | |
| Labor | 1. Shelley Archer (elected 1); 2. Jon Ford (elected 3); 3. Vince Catania (elected 5); 4. Shelley Eaton; 5. Michael Anderton; 6. Stephen Dawson | 22,060 | 44.0 | +4.5 |
| Liberal | 1. Norman Moore (elected 2); 2. Ken Baston (elected 4); 3. Brett Nazzari; 4. John Fawcett; 5. Greg Smith | 17,908 | 35.7 | +9.0 |
| Greens | 1. Robin Chapple; 2. Kado Muir | 3,798 | 7.6 | +3.2 |
| Group I | 1. John Fischer; 2. Graeme Campbell; 3. Valerie McCooke | 2,955 | 5.9 | +5.9 |
| One Nation | 1. Irene Wyborn; 2. Neville Smith | 1,022 | 2.0 | −11.9 |
| Public Hospital Support Group | 1. Henry Beal; 2. Jim Jennings | 924 | 1.8 | +1.8 |
| Christian Democrats | 1. Chris Lakay; 2. Derk Gans | 815 | 1.6 | +1.6 |
| Democrats | 1. Don Hoddy; 2. Peter Crawford | 317 | 0.6 | −1.0 |
| Liberals for Forests | 1. Karen Jones; 2. Alexandra O'Shaughnessy | 227 | 0.5 | +0.5 |
| Citizens Electoral Council | Brian Lewis | 78 | 0.2 | +0.2 |
| Total formal votes | | 50,104 | 97.1 | −0.5 |
| Informal votes | | 1,506 | 2.9 | +0.5 |
| Turnout | | 51,610 | 75.6 | −4.3 |

=== 2001 ===
2001 Western Australian state election: Mining and Pastoral
| Party | Candidate | Votes | % | ±% |
|---|---|---|---|---|
| Quota | | 8,691 | | |
| Labor | 1. Tom Stephens (elected 1); 2. Jon Ford (elected 3); 3. Kevin Leahy; 4. Liz Tassell; 5. Margaret Vincent; 6. Mike Anderton | 20,596 | 39.5 | −8.5 |
| Liberal | 1. Norman Moore (elected 2); 2. Greg Smith; 3. Isabelle Scott; 4. Ken Baston; 5. John Fawcett | 13,908 | 26.7 | −9.0 |
| One Nation | 1. John Fischer (elected 4); 2. Wayne Trembath; 3. Irene Wybom | 7,247 | 13.9 | +13.9 |
| Independent | 1. Mark Nevill; 2. Randy Spargo; 3. Janeneil Sibosado | 4,878 | 9.4 | +9.4 |
| Greens | 1. Robin Chapple (elected 5); 2. Scott Ludlam | 2,305 | 4.4 | +4.4 |
| National | 1. Dudley Maslen; 2. Paul Ausburn; 3. Peter Kneebone | 1,361 | 2.6 | −7.1 |
| Democrats | 1. Don Hoddy; 2. Pam Heald | 834 | 1.6 | −3.4 |
| Independent | 1. Tom Helm; 2. Diane Mills | 813 | 1.6 | +1.6 |
| Independent | Vin Cooper | 140 | 0.3 | +0.3 |
| Independent | Murray Kennedy | 62 | 0.1 | +0.1 |
| Total formal votes | | 52,144 | 97.6 | +0.3 |
| Informal votes | | 1,298 | 2.4 | −0.3 |
| Turnout | | 53,442 | 79.9 | +1.3 |

=== 1996 ===
1996 Western Australian state election: Mining and Pastoral
| Party | Candidate | Votes | % | ±% |
|---|---|---|---|---|
| Quota | | 8,707 | | |
| Labor | 1. Tom Stephens (elected 1); 2. Mark Nevill (elected 3); 3. Tom Helm (elected 5); 4. Peter McKerrow; 5. Jon Ford; 6. Omega Porteous | 25,070 | 48.0 | −6.5 |
| Liberal | 1. Norman Moore (elected 2); 2. Greg Smith (elected 4); 3. Ken Baston; 4. Les Moss; 5. John Fawcett | 18,635 | 35.7 | −1.2 |
| National | 1. Dudley Maslen; 2. Maxine Cable; 3. Kevin Williams | 5,087 | 9.7 | +9.7 |
| Democrats | 1. Patti Turney; 2. Shaaron du Bignon | 2,620 | 5.0 | +2.4 |
| Natural Law | 1. Lesley Maher; 2. Jennifer Andrews | 828 | 1.6 | +1.6 |
| Total formal votes | | 52,240 | 97.3 | −0.2 |
| Informal votes | | 1,440 | 2.7 | +0.2 |
| Turnout | | 53,680 | 78.6 | −7.3 |

=== 1993 ===
1993 Western Australian state election: Mining and Pastoral
| Party | Candidate | Votes | % | ±% |
|---|---|---|---|---|
| Quota | | 9,097 | | |
| Labor | 1. Tom Stephens (elected 1); 2. Mark Nevill (elected 3); 3. Tom Helm (elected 5); 4. Peter McKerrow; 5. Bob Couzens; 6. Paul Summers | 29,767 | 54.54 | +0.89 |
| Liberal | 1. Norman Moore (elected 2); 2. Phil Lockyer (elected 4); 3. Sally Wilkinson; 4. Sandy McTaggart | 20,115 | 36.85 | +3.26 |
| Greens | 1. Robin Chapple; 2. Keith Lockyer | 2,747 | 5.03 | +1.82 |
| Democrats | 1. Vin Cooper; 2. Shyama Peebles | 1,440 | 2.64 | −0.07 |
| Grey Power | Don Gudgeon | 511 | 0.94 | +0.94 |
| Total formal votes | | 54,580 | 97.53 | +0.11 |
| Informal votes | | 1,383 | 2.47 | −0.11 |
| Turnout | | 55,963 | 85.95 | |

=== 1989 ===
1989 Western Australian state election: Mining and Pastoral
| Party | Candidate | Votes | % | ±% |
|---|---|---|---|---|
| Quota | | 8,331 | | |
| Labor | 1. Tom Stephens (elected 1); 2. Mark Nevill (elected 3); 3. Tom Helm (elected 4); 4. Robert Couzens; 5. Margaret Halid; 6. Sylvia Hurse | 26,819 | 53.65 | |
| Liberal | 1. Norman Moore (elected 2); 2. Phil Lockyer (elected 5); 3. Margaret Day; 4. Sally Wilkinson; 5. Louie Carnicelli | 16,791 | 33.59 | |
| National | 1. Peter Kneebone; 2. Ronald Smales; 3. John Ford | 1,815 | 3.63 | |
| Greens | 1. Leslie Lee; 2. Desmond Hill; 3. Brian Champion; 4. Allan Barker; 5. Jeanette Johnson | 1,607 | 3.21 | |
| Democrats | Shyama Peebles | 1,354 | 2.71 | |
| Independent | Lynton Downe | 866 | 1.73 | |
| One Australia Movement | 1. Megan Shedley; 2. Donald Shedley | 736 | 1.47 | |
| Total formal votes | | 49,988 | 97.42 | |
| Informal votes | | 1,325 | 2.58 | |
| Turnout | | 51,313 | 80.91 | |
