= Candidates of the 2013 Western Australian state election =

This is a list of candidates for the 2013 Western Australian state election. The election was held on 9 March 2013.

== Redistribution and seat changes ==
- A redistribution was completed in 2011. The most significant changes were:
  - The Labor-held seat of Mindarie was renamed Butler.
  - The Liberal-held seat of Morley became notionally Labor.
  - The seat of Nollamara was replaced by the new seat of Mirrabooka.
  - The Labor-held seat of North West was replaced by the National-held seat of North West Central.
  - The National-held seat of Blackwood-Stirling had been renamed Warren-Blackwood.
- Labor MLC for East Metropolitan Ljiljanna Ravlich contested North Metropolitan.
- Two National Party MLCs, Mia Davies (Agricultural) and Wendy Duncan (Mining and Pastoral), contested the lower house seats of Central Wheatbelt and Kalgoorlie respectively.
- The National Party MLA for Central Wheatbelt, Brendon Grylls, contested the seat of Pilbara.
- Greens MLC for North Metropolitan Giz Watson contested the region of South West.

== Retiring MPs ==
=== Labor ===
- John Kobelke MLA (Balcatta)
- Carol Martin MLA (Kimberley)
- Eric Ripper MLA (Belmont)
- Tom Stephens MLA (Pilbara)
- Martin Whitely MLA (Bassendean)
- Helen Bullock MLC (Mining and Pastoral)
- Ed Dermer MLC (North Metropolitan)
- Linda Savage MLC (East Metropolitan)

=== Liberal ===
- Christian Porter MLA (Bateman) — to contest the federal seat of Pearce
- Norman Moore MLC (Mining and Pastoral)

=== National ===
- Grant Woodhams MLA (Moore)

=== Independent ===
- John Bowler MLA (Kalgoorlie)
- Liz Constable MLA (Churchlands)

== Legislative Assembly ==
Incumbent members are shown in bold text. Successful candidates are highlighted in the relevant colour.

Electorate	Held by	Labor candidate	Liberal candidate	National candidate	Greens candidate	Christians candidate	Other candidates
Albany	Labor	**Peter Watson**	Trevor Cosh	Robert Sutton	Diane Evers	Hans Vermeulen	Barry Critchison (FFP)
Alfred Cove	Independent	David Houston	Dean Nalder		Ros Harman		Estelle Gom (-); **Janet Woollard** (Ind)
Armadale	Labor	**Tony Buti**	Katherine Webster		Damon Pages-Oliver	Jamie van Burgel	
Balcatta	Labor	Janet Pettigrew	Chris Hatton		Sheridan Young	Peter Dodd	Lesley Croll (FFP); Mubarak Kim Kidima (Ind); Joe Ruzzi (Ind)
Bassendean	Labor	Dave Kelly	Bob Brown		Jennie Carter	Paul Mewhor	
Bateman	Liberal	Rob Chasland	Matt Taylor		Rebecca Leighton		
Belmont	Labor	Cassie Rowe	Glenys Godfrey		Steve Wolff	Steve Klomp	
Bunbury	Liberal	Karen Steele	**John Castrilli**	James Forsyth	Mitchella Hutchins	Edward Dabrowski	Lui Alfa Canedoli (Ind); Linda Rose (FFP)
Butler	Labor	**John Quigley**	Linda Aitken		Thomas Webster	Steven Leeder	
Cannington	Labor	**Bill Johnston**	Jesse Jacobs		Christine Cunningham		Mark Harrington (Ind)
Carine	Liberal	Sharon Webb	**Tony Krsticevic**		Nathalie Cattaneo	Rick Davey	
Central Wheatbelt	National	John Watters	Stephen Strange	Mia Davies	Tricia Walters	Bob Adair	Gerald Sturman (Ind)
Churchlands	Independent	Patrick Ashforth	Sean L'Estrange		Cameron Pidgeon	Pat Seymour	Jim Bivoltsis (Ind); Wayne Monks (Ind); Elizabeth Re (Ind)
Cockburn	Labor	**Fran Logan**	Don Barrett		Shannon Hewitt		Derek Rosborough (Ind)
Collie-Preston	Labor	**Mick Murray**	Jaimee Motion	Peter Hutchinson	Kingsley Gibson		Alice Harper (FFP); Clinton Knop (-)
Cottesloe	Liberal	Emma Williams	**Colin Barnett**		Greg Boland	Neil Fearis	Kevin Morgan (Ind)
Darling Range	Liberal	Barry Urban	**Tony Simpson**		Denise Hardie	Madeleine Goiran	
Dawesville	Liberal	Fred Riebeling	**Kim Hames**	Bryn Butler	Patricia Armstrong		Brenton Baker (FFP); Dave Schumacher (Ind)
Eyre	Liberal	Greg Smith	**Graham Jacobs**	Colin de Grussa	Giorgia Johnson	Brett Hilton	
Forrestfield	Labor	**Andrew Waddell**	Nathan Morton		Peter Burrell	Troy Eikelboom	Mike Munro (FFP)
Fremantle	Greens	Simone McGurk	Matthew Hanssen		Andrew Sullivan		Sanna Andrew (-); **Adele Carles** (Ind); Jan ter Horst (Ind)
Geraldton	Liberal	Kathryn Mannion	**Ian Blayney**	Shane Van Styn	Paul Connolly	Carmen Burdett	
Girrawheen	Labor	**Margaret Quirk**	John Halligan		Saba Kafami	Mel Davey	Che Tam Nguyen (FFP)
Gosnells	Labor	**Chris Tallentire**	David Goode		Luke Edmonds	Mark Staer	Debbie Butler (Ind); Chris Fernandez (Ind)
Hillarys	Liberal	Sam Thomas	**Rob Johnson**		Adam Collins	Michael Ford	
Jandakot	Liberal	Klara Andric	**Joe Francis**		John Haynes		
Joondalup	Labor	**Tony O'Gorman**	Jan Norberger		Brittany Young	Geoff McDavitt	
Kalamunda	Liberal	Mick Wainwright	**John Day**		Toni Warden	Hannah Williams	Greg Ross (Ind); Geoff Stallard (Ind)
Kalgoorlie	Independent	Terrence Winner	Melissa Price	Wendy Duncan	Tim Hall	Ross Paterson	
Kimberley	Labor	Josie Farrer	Jenny Bloom	Michele Pucci	Chris Maher	Craig Simons	Rod Ogilvie (Ind)
Kingsley	Liberal	Brian Corr	**Andrea Mitchell**		Diana MacTiernan	Sophie Ann Mason	
Kwinana	Labor	**Roger Cook**	John Jamieson		Iwan Boskamp	Stephen Wardell-Johnson	Carol Adams (Ind)
Mandurah	Labor	**David Templeman**	Tony Solin	Jake Ash	Chilla Bulbeck		Charles Bryant (Ind); John Hughes (Ind); Andrew Newhouse (FFP)
Maylands	Labor	**Lisa Baker**	Sylvan Albert		Dee O'Neill	Paul Madden	
Midland	Labor	**Michelle Roberts**	Daniel Parasiliti		Pippa Tandy	Isaac Moran	
Mirrabooka	Labor	**Janine Freeman**	Andrea Creado		Mark Cooper	Lois Host	
Moore	National	Peter Johnson	Chris Wilkins	Shane Love	Dee Margetts	Wes Porter	
Morley	Labor	Reece Whitby	**Ian Britza**		Sally Palmer	Ross Fraser	Greg Halls (FFP)
Mount Lawley	Liberal	Bob Kucera	**Michael Sutherland**		Tim Clifford	Paul Connelly	Dave Bolt (FFP)
Murray-Wellington	Liberal	David Scaife	**Murray Cowper**	Michael Rose	Deni Fuller		Laurie Fuller (FFP); Norm Heslington (Ind)
Nedlands	Liberal	Tony Walker	**Bill Marmion**		George Crisp	Gail Forder	Max Hipkins (Ind)
North West Central	National	Jennifer Shelton	Tami Maitre	**Vince Catania**	Des Pike	Andrew Eddison	
Ocean Reef	Liberal	Philippa Taylor	**Albert Jacob**		Mary O'Byrne	Lyn Kennedy	Aliné Croll (FFP)
Perth	Labor	**John Hyde**	Eleni Evangel		Jonathan Hallett	Kevin Host	Farida Iqbal (-)
Pilbara	Labor	Kelly Howlett	George Levissianos	**Brendon Grylls**	Julie Matheson	Bruce Richards	Brent McKenna (Ind)
Riverton	Liberal	Hannah Beazley	**Mike Nahan**		Marcus Atkinson		Joe Delle Donne (Ind)
Rockingham	Labor	**Mark McGowan**	Matthew Pollock		Dawn Jecks	John Wieske	Matthew Whitfield (Ind)
Scarborough	Liberal	Eddie Lennie	**Liza Harvey**		Judith Cullity	Bruce Olsen	
South Perth	Liberal	Dustin Rafferty	**John McGrath**		Peter Best		David Mangini (Ind)
Southern River	Liberal	Susy Thomas	**Peter Abetz**		Kate Gnanapragasam	Damian Posthuma	
Swan Hills	Liberal	Ian Radisich	**Frank Alban**		Dominique Lieb	John Tapley	Kyran Sharrin (FFP)
Vasse	Liberal	Lee Edmundson	**Troy Buswell**	James Wishart	Michael Baldock		Bernie Masters (Ind); Gary Norden (Ind); Julie Westbrook (FFP)
Victoria Park	Labor	**Ben Wyatt**	Haider Zaman		Sarah Newbold		
Wagin	National	Josh Stokes	Phillip Blight	**Terry Waldron**	Shirley Collins	Jacky Young	
Wanneroo	Liberal	Brett Treby	**Paul Miles**		Rob Phillips	Meg Birch	Moyna Rapp (FFP)
Warnbro	Labor	**Paul Papalia**	Joel Marks		Jordon Steele-John		
Warren-Blackwood	National	John Thorpe	Ray Colyer	**Terry Redman**	Nerilee Boshammer		Phillip Douglass (FFP); Kim Redman (-); Louie Scibilia (Ind)
West Swan	Labor	**Rita Saffioti**	Natasha Cheung		Peter Leam	Esther Wieske	
Willagee	Labor	**Peter Tinley**	Samuel Piipponen		Alisha Ryans-Taylor		Wayne D. Shortland (Ind); Teresa van Lieshout (Ind); Sam Wainwright (-)

== Legislative Council ==
Six candidates are elected in each region. Incumbent members in are shown in bold text. Tickets that elected at least one MLC are highlighted in the relevant colour. Successful candidates are identified by an asterisk (*).

=== Agricultural Region ===
Labor candidates	Liberal candidates	National candidates	Greens candidates	Christians candidates	Family First candidates
1. Darren West*; 2. **Matt Benson-Lidholm**; 3. Judy Riggs; 4. Sheila Mills; 5. Bob Somerville; 6. Graeme McBeath	1. **Jim Chown***; 2. **Brian Ellis***; 3. Steve Martin; 4. Alan McFarland; 5. Sarah Panizza; 6. James McLagan	1. Martin Aldridge*; 2. Paul Brown*; 3. Jill Sounness; 4. Cathie Bowen; 5. Rosalba Butterworth	1. Andrew Huntley; 2. Sarah Nielsen-Harvey	1. Trevor Young; 2. Lachlan Dunjey	1. Peter Custers; 2. Steven Fuhrmann
Shooters candidates	Group C candidates	Group E candidates	Group G candidates	Group H candidates	Group L candidates
1. Rick Mazza*; 2. Ray Hull	1. **Max Trenorden**; 2. **Philip Gardiner**; 3. Bill Cowan; 4. Rob Kestel; 5. Lindsay Tuckwell	1. Anthony Fels; 2. Felly Chandra	1. Peter Swift; 2. Rod Davis	1. Anne-Marie Copeland; 2. Ian James; 3. Darrell Boase	1. Osama Rifai; 2. Yaebiyo Araya
Ungrouped candidates					
Tony Bozich; Gregory Kenney					

=== East Metropolitan Region ===
Labor candidates	Liberal candidates	Greens candidates	Christians candidates	Family First candidates	Shooters candidates
1. Alanna Clohesy*; 2. Samantha Rowe*; 3. Amber-Jade Sanderson*; 4. Bill Leadbetter; 5. Michelle O'Driscoll; 6. Andy Smith	1. **Helen Morton***; 2. **Donna Faragher***; 3. **Alyssa Hayden***; 4. Caroline Preuss; 5. Darryl Trease; 6. Jessica Thorpe-Gudgeon	1. **Alison Xamon**; 2. Glenice Smith; 3. David Bromfield	1. Dwight Randall; 2. David Kingston	1. Paul Barrett; 2. Nathan Clifford	1. Michael Georgiou; 2. Grant Cooper
Ungrouped candidates					
Chung Tu; Tom Hoyer; Joe Nardizzi					

=== Mining and Pastoral Region ===
Labor candidates	Liberal candidates	National candidates	Greens candidates	Christians candidates	Family First candidates
1. Stephen Dawson*; 2. Jim Murie; 3. Shane Hill; 4. **Jon Ford**; 5. Linda Morich; 6. Renee Portland	1. **Ken Baston***; 2. Mark Lewis*; 3. Eden Coad; 4. Ross Wood; 5. Ross Beckett	1. Jacqui Boydell*; 2. Dave Grills*; 3. John McCourt; 4. David Eagles; 5. Adrian Hatwell; 6. Cale Hill	1. **Robin Chapple***; 2. Kado Muir	1. Roger Mansell; 2. Mike Walsh	1. Ian Rose; 2. Cedric Harper
Shooters candidates	Ungrouped candidates				
1. John Parkes; 2. Stefan Colagiuri	Frank Bertola				

=== North Metropolitan Region ===
Labor candidates	Liberal candidates	Greens candidates	Christians candidates	Family First candidates	Shooters candidates
1. **Ken Travers***; 2. **Ljiljanna Ravlich***; 3. Martin Pritchard; 4. Laine McDonald; 5. Sarah Seymour; 6. Rebeka Marton	1. **Peter Collier***; 2. **Michael Mischin***; 3. **Liz Behjat***; 4. Peter Katsambanis*; 5. Elise Irwin; 6. Paul Collins	1. Cameron Poustie; 2. Rebecca Brown; 3. Heather Aquilina	1. Ray Moran; 2. Rudy Labordus	1. Henry Heng; 2. Douglas Croker	1. Paul Bedford; 2. D'arne Stubbs
Ungrouped candidates					
Noel Avery; Angela Smith; Douglas Thorp; Michael Tucak					

=== South Metropolitan Region ===
Labor candidates	Liberal candidates	Greens candidates	Christians candidates	Family First candidates	Shooters candidates
1. **Sue Ellery***; 2. **Kate Doust***; 3. Anne Wood; 4. Dominic Rose; 5. Sharon Thiel; 6. Sandy Bird	1. **Simon O'Brien***; 2. **Nick Goiran***; 3. **Phil Edman***; 4. Gabriel Moens; 5. Michelle Jack	1. **Lynn MacLaren***; 2. Tammy Solonec; 3. Jean Jenkins	1. Bob Burdett; 2. Ka-ren Chew	1. Jim McCourt; 2. Steve Bolt	1. Ian Blevin; 2. Michael Glover
Ungrouped candidates					
John Tucak; Keith Wilson; Jim Grayden					

=== South West Region ===
Labor candidates	Liberal candidates	National candidates	Greens candidates	Christians candidates	Family First candidates
1. **Sally Talbot***; 2. **Adele Farina***; 3. John Mondy; 4. Ian Bishop; 5. Aaron Dean; 6. Pearl Lim	1. **Robyn McSweeney***; 2. **Nigel Hallett***; 3. **Barry House***; 4. Ian Morison; 5. Paul Fitzpatrick; 6. Michelle Steck	1. **Colin Holt***; 2. Sam Harma; 3. Dudley Greathead	1. **Giz Watson**; 2. Hsien Harper	1. Justin Moseley; 2. Tim Schoof	1. Bev Custers; 2. David Bolt
Shooters candidates	Group D candidates	Ungrouped candidates			
1. Daniel Strijk; 2. Mark Mazza	1. Nataporn Sri-Innop Ross; 2. Janet Grogan	Don Hyland			

== Unregistered parties and groups ==
- The Socialist Alliance endorsed Sanna Andrew in Fremantle, Farida Iqbal in Perth and Sam Wainwright in Willagee.
