= Results of the 2021 Western Australian state election (Legislative Council) =

2021 Western Australian state election (Legislative Council)
- 13 March 2021

All 36 seats in the Western Australian Legislative Council 18 seats needed for a majority
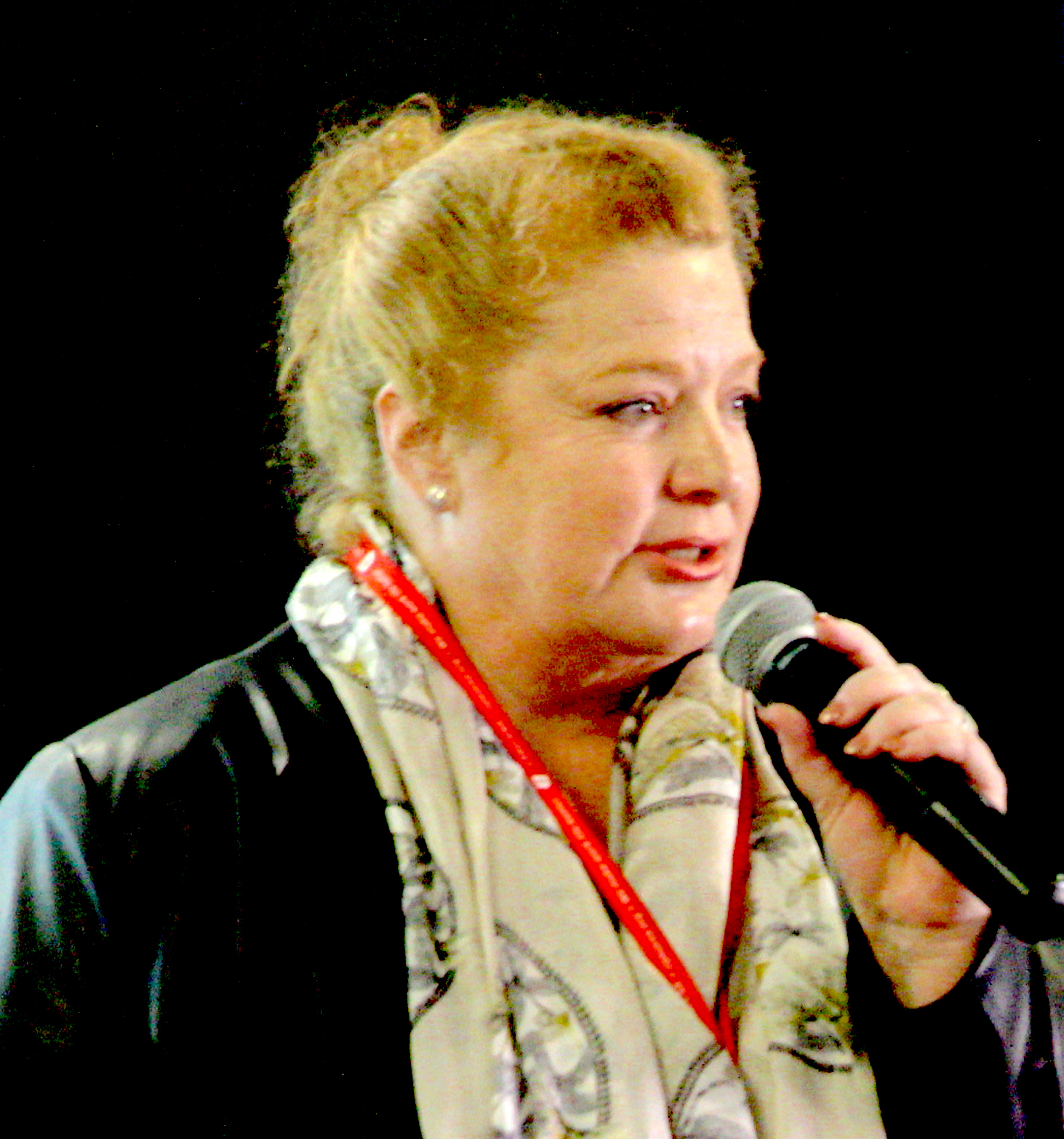

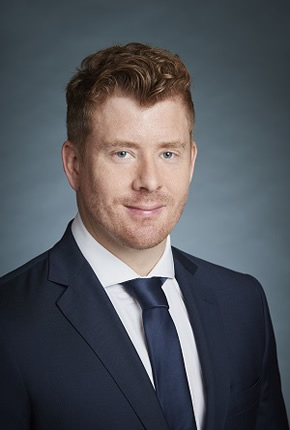

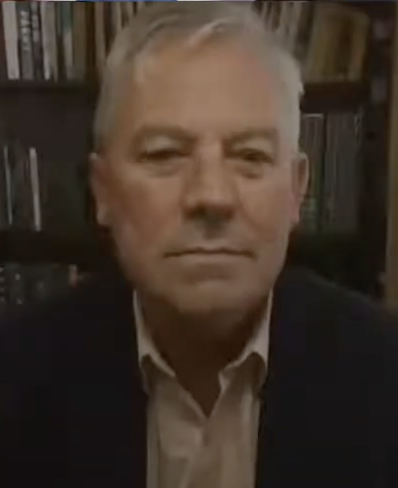

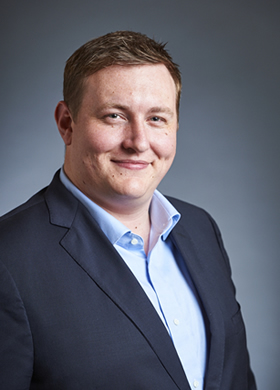
| | First party | Second party | Third party |
|---|---|---|---|
| Leader | Sue Ellery | Steve Thomas | Colin de Grussa |
| Party | Labor | Liberal | National |
| Leader's seat | South Metropolitan | South West | Agricultural |
| Seats before | 14 | 9 | 4 |
| Seats won | 22 | 7 | 3 |
| Seat change | ▲8 | ▼2 | ▼1 |
| Primary vote | 868,374 | 254,380 | 40,285 |
| Percentage | 60.34% | 17.68% | 2.80% |
| Swing | ▲19.93pp | ▼9.03pp | ▼1.63pp |
| | Fourth party | Fifth party | Sixth party |
| | LCWA |
| Leader | No leader | No leader | Wilson Tucker |
| Party | Legalise Cannabis | Greens | Daylight Saving |
| Alliance | | | MPA |
| Leader's seat | | N/A | Mining and Pastoral (won seat) |
| Seats before | 0 | 4 | 0 |
| Seats won | 2 | 1 | 1 |
| Seat change | ▲2 | ▼3 | ▲1 |
| Primary vote | 28,473 | 91,849 | 3,485 |
| Percentage | 1.98% | 6.38% | 0.24% |
| Swing | ▲1.98pp | ▼2.22pp | ▼0.44pp |
| | Seventh party | Eighth party | Ninth party |
| | | SFF |
| Leader | Colin Tincknell | Rick Mazza | Aaron Stonehouse |
| Party | One Nation | Shooters | Liberal Democrats |
| Leader's seat | South West (lost seat) | Agricultural (lost seat) | South Metropolitan (lost seat) |
| Seats before | 3 | 1 | 1 |
| Seats won | 0 | 0 | 0 |
| Seat change | ▼3 | ▼1 | ▼1 |
| Primary vote | 21,259 | 21,210 | 9,218 |
| Percentage | 1.48% | 1.47% | 0.64% |
| Swing | ▼6.71pp | ▼0.89pp | ▼1.13pp |

This is a list of electoral region results for the Western Australian Legislative Council in the 2021 Western Australian state election.

The Daylight Saving and Legalise Cannabis party won their first ever Western Australian Legislative Council seat at this election.

== Results summary ==
Government (22) Labor (22) Opposition (10) Liberal (7) National (3) Crossbench (4) Legalise Cannabis (2) Greens (1) Daylight Saving (1)

Legislative Council (STV/GVT) – turnout 85.50% (CV)
| Party | Primary votes | % | Swing | Seats | +/- |
|---|---|---|---|---|---|
| Labor | 868,374 | 60.34 | +19.93 | 22 | ▲8 |
| Liberal | 254,380 | 17.68 | −9.03 | 7 | ▼2 |
| Greens | 91,849 | 6.38 | −2.22 | 1 | ▼3 |
| National | 40,285 | 2.80 | −1.63 | 3 | ▼1 |
| Legalise Cannabis | 28,473 | 1.98 | +1.98 | 2 | ▲2 |
| Australian Christians | 28,051 | 1.95 | +0.01 | 0 | Steady |
| One Nation | 21,259 | 1.48 | −6.71 | 0 | ▼3 |
| Shooters, Fishers, Farmers | 21,210 | 1.47 | −0.89 | 0 | ▼1 |
| No Mandatory Vaccination | 16,094 | 1.12 | +1.12 | 0 | Steady |
| Western Australia | 10,496 | 0.73 | +0.34 | 0 | Steady |
| Animal Justice | 9,732 | 0.64 | −0.42 | 0 | Steady |
| Liberal Democrats | 9,218 | 0.64 | −1.13 | 0 | ▼1 |
| Liberals for Climate | 7,515 | 0.52 | +0.08 | 0 | Steady |
| WAxit | 4,924 | 0.34 | −0.21 | 0 | Steady |
| Sustainable Australia | 4,405 | 0.31 | +0.31 | 0 | Steady |
| Daylight Saving | 3,485 | 0.24 | −0.44 | 1 | ▲1 |
| Great Australian | 3,397 | 0.24 | +0.24 | 0 | Steady |
| Health Australia | 3,105 | 0.22 | +0.22 | 0 | Steady |
| Socialist Alliance | 948 | 0.07 | −0.04 | 0 | Steady |
| Independents | 11,486 | 0.80 | −0.35 | 0 | Steady |
| Other | 482 | 0.03 | +0.03 | 0 | Steady |
| Formal votes | 1,439,168 | 98.05 | +0.76 | | |
| Informal votes | 28,577 | 1.95 | −0.76 | | |
| Total | 1,467,745 | | | 36 | |
| Registered voters / turnout | 1,716,732 | 85.50 | | | |

=== Distribution of seats ===
| Electoral region | Seats held |
|---|---|
| Agricultural | |
| East Metropolitan | |
| Mining and Pastoral | |
| North Metropolitan | |
| South Metropolitan | |
| South West | |

| Daylight Saving |
| Greens |
| Labor |
| Legalise Cannabis |
| Liberal |
| National |

== Results by electoral region ==
=== Agricultural ===
2021 Western Australian state election: Agricultural
| Party | Candidate | Votes | % | ±% |
|---|---|---|---|---|
| Quota | | 12,357 | | |
| Labor | 1. Darren West (elected 1); 2. Shelley Payne (elected 3); 3. Sandra Carr (elected 4); 4. Luke Clarkson | 39,263 | 45.39 | +21.39 |
| National | 1. Colin de Grussa (elected 2); 2. Martin Aldridge (elected 6); 3. Natasha Colliver; 4. Steve Blyth; 5. Rob Horstman; 6. Ian Hanna | 22,999 | 26.59 | −4.72 |
| Liberal | 1. Steve Martin (elected 5); 2. Kathryn Jackson; 3. Jim Chown; 4. Maria Girak; 5. Brett Jackson | 10,672 | 12.34 | −6.31 |
| Shooters, Fishers, Farmers | 1. Stuart Ostle; 2. Ronald Lean | 3,572 | 4.13 | −1.52 |
| Greens | 1. Peter Leam; 2. Vivienne Glance | 2,579 | 2.98 | −0.62 |
| One Nation | 1. Rod Caddies; 2. Emma McKinley | 1,765 | 2.04 | −9.62 |
| Christians | 1. Trevor Young; 2. Les Holten | 1,295 | 1.50 | −0.34 |
| Legalise Cannabis | 1. Leo Treasure; 2. Keith Clinton | 1,150 | 1.33 | +1.33 |
| No Mandatory Vaccination | 1. Aaron Horsman; 2. Jessica Young | 685 | 0.79 | +0.79 |
| Western Australia | 1. Michael O'Loghlen; 2. Allan Butson | 462 | 0.53 | +0.24 |
| Animal Justice | 1. Courtney Henry; 2. Roberta Vlaar | 339 | 0.39 | +0.39 |
| Liberal Democrats | 1. Connor Whittle; 2. Cameron Puttick | 339 | 0.39 | −0.70 |
| Liberals for Climate | 1. Peter Turner; 2. Nathan Thomson | 205 | 0.24 | −0.12 |
| Health Australia | 1. Bass Tadros; 2. Svetlana Ivanchenko | 201 | 0.23 | +0.23 |
| WAxit | 1. Russell Sewell; 2. Simon Glossop | 186 | 0.22 | +0.11 |
| Great Australian | 1. Lawrie Carr; 2. Shane Edwards | 185 | 0.21 | +0.21 |
| Sustainable Australia | 1. Greg Norris; 2. James Fowler | 153 | 0.18 | +0.18 |
| Independent | Parminder Singh | 134 | 0.15 | +0.15 |
| Daylight Saving | 1. Brett Tucker; 2. Andrew Wilson | 69 | 0.08 | −0.14 |
| Independent | 1. J. M. David | 66 | 0.08 | +0.08 |
| Independent | 1. Felly Chandra; 2. Chelsea Henderson | 62 | 0.07 | +0.07 |
| Independent | Andrew Ballantyne | 36 | 0.04 | +0.04 |
| Independent | Les Mirco | 27 | 0.03 | +0.03 |
| Independent | Peter Wallis | 25 | 0.03 | +0.03 |
| Independent | Steven Hopkins | 24 | 0.03 | +0.03 |
| Total formal votes | | 86,493 | 97.77 | +0.68 |
| Informal votes | | 1,969 | 2.23 | −0.68 |
| Turnout | | 88,462 | 85.57 | −1.63 |

=== East Metropolitan ===
2021 Western Australian state election: East Metropolitan
| Party | Candidate | Votes | % | ±% |
|---|---|---|---|---|
| Quota | | 50,311 | | |
| Labor | 1. Alanna Clohesy (elected 1); 2. Samantha Rowe (elected 2); 3. Matthew Swinbourn (elected 3); 4. Lorna Harper (elected 4); 5. Robert Green; 6. John Keogh | 232,094 | 65.90 | +19.40 |
| Liberal | 1. Donna Faragher (elected 5); 2. Phil Twiss; 3. Greg Halls; 4. Daniel Newman; 5. Jeremy Quinn | 48,343 | 13.73 | −11.23 |
| Greens | 1. Tim Clifford; 2. Caroline Perks; 3. Callan Gray | 21,285 | 6.04 | −2.86 |
| Legalise Cannabis | 1. Brian Walker (elected 6); 2. Karl Reinmuth | 9,258 | 2.63 | +2.63 |
| Christians | 1. Maryka Groenewald; 2. Jamie van Burgel | 8,860 | 2.52 | +0.04 |
| One Nation | 1. Dale Grillo; 2. Tim Orr | 5,122 | 1.45 | −6.57 |
| Shooters, Fishers, Farmers | 1. Trevor Ruwoldt; 2. Coby Thomas | 4,436 | 1.26 | −0.78 |
| No Mandatory Vaccination | 1. Patricia Ayre; 2. Daniel Hall | 3,987 | 1.13 | +1.13 |
| Western Australia | 1. Charles Smith; 2. James Anthony | 2,904 | 0.82 | +0.41 |
| Independent | Peter Lyndon-James | 2,738 | 0.78 | +0.78 |
| Animal Justice | 1. Amanda Dorn; 2. Nicole Arielli | 2,571 | 0.73 | −0.73 |
| Liberal Democrats | 1. Craig Buchanan; 2. Neil Hamilton | 1,879 | 0.53 | −0.50 |
| Liberals for Climate | 1. Marilyn Lottering; 2. R. Smith | 1,818 | 0.52 | +0.06 |
| Independent | 1. David Larsen; 2. Brian Brightman | 1,360 | 0.39 | +0.39 |
| WAxit | 1. Satinder Samra; 2. Robin Singh; 3. Monty Singh | 1,223 | 0.35 | −0.41 |
| Health Australia | 1. Lidia Skorokhod; 2. Lisa Rowe | 1,106 | 0.31 | +0.31 |
| Sustainable Australia | 1. Nicole Watts; 2. Keith Lethbridge | 1,047 | 0.30 | +0.30 |
| Daylight Saving | 1. James McManus; 2. Mark Bradley | 828 | 0.24 | −0.55 |
| Great Australian | 1. Benny Tilbury; 2. Bradley Ward | 820 | 0.23 | +0.23 |
| Independent | Hayley Doan | 494 | 0.14 | +0.14 |
| Total formal votes | | 352,173 | 97.75 | +0.66 |
| Informal votes | | 8,098 | 2.25 | −0.66 |
| Turnout | | 360,271 | 85.02 | −2.19 |

=== Mining and Pastoral ===
2021 Western Australian state election: Mining and Pastoral
| Party | Candidate | Votes | % | ±% |
|---|---|---|---|---|
| Quota | | 7,010 | | |
| Labor | 1. Stephen Dawson (elected 1); 2. Kyle McGinn (elected 2); 3. Peter Foster (elected 3); 4. Rosetta Sahanna (elected 4); 5. Kelvin Portland; 6. Bobby-Lee Field | 28,002 | 57.07 | +22.91 |
| Liberal | 1. Neil Thomson (elected 6); 2. Michael Huston; 3. Jodie Richardson; 4. Matt Blampey | 5,250 | 10.70 | −4.99 |
| National | 1. Nicholas Fardell; 2. Lionel Quartermaine; 3. Tony Crook; 4. Kieran Dart; 5. Mark Young; 6. Tessa Daly | 5,032 | 10.26 | −8.72 |
| Greens | 1. Kimberly Smith; 2. Giz Watson | 2,431 | 4.95 | −0.72 |
| Shooters, Fishers, Farmers | 1. Matt Priest; 2. Royce Normington; 3. Kingsley Smith | 1,705 | 3.48 | −1.67 |
| One Nation | 1. Robin Scott; 2. David Modolo | 1,490 | 3.04 | −10.66 |
| Legalise Cannabis | 1. James Brown; 2. Donald Watt | 1,277 | 2.60 | +2.60 |
| Western Australia | 1. Dave Grills; 2. Julie Matheson | 729 | 1.49 | +1.22 |
| Christians | 1. Jacky Young; 2. Ross Patterson | 582 | 1.19 | −0.32 |
| Liberals for Climate | 1. Curtis Greening; 2. Gavin McFerran | 552 | 1.13 | +0.10 |
| No Mandatory Vaccination | 1. Andrew Middleton; 2. Deborah Middleton | 526 | 1.07 | +1.07 |
| Animal Justice | 1. Emmarae Cole-Darby; 2. Scott Dunning | 398 | 0.81 | +0.81 |
| Liberal Democrats | 1. Robbie Parr; 2. Jake McCoull | 198 | 0.40 | −0.29 |
| Independent | 1. Tayla Squires; 2. Cameron Gardiner | 188 | 0.38 | +0.38 |
| Sustainable Australia | 1. Brian Mollan; 2. Anthony Park | 158 | 0.32 | +0.32 |
| WAxit | 1. Brenden Hatton; 2. Huw Grossmith | 116 | 0.24 | +0.10 |
| Great Australian | 1. Nathan Webb-Smith; 2. Laona Mullings | 113 | 0.23 | +0.23 |
| Daylight Saving | 1. Wilson Tucker (elected 5); 2. Janet Wilson | 98 | 0.20 | −0.30 |
| Independent | 1. Anthony Fels; 2. Van Son Le | 85 | 0.17 | +0.17 |
| Health Australia | 1. Teddy Craies; 2. Simon Martin | 82 | 0.17 | +0.17 |
| Independent | 1. Christine Kelly; 2. Noel McGinniss | 52 | 0.11 | +0.11 |
| Total formal votes | | 49,064 | 97.83 | +0.74 |
| Informal votes | | 1,088 | 2.17 | −0.74 |
| Turnout | | 50,152 | 72.00 | −15.20 |

=== North Metropolitan ===
2021 Western Australian state election: North Metropolitan
| Party | Candidate | Votes | % | ±% |
|---|---|---|---|---|
| Quota | | 52,319 | | |
| Labor | 1. Pierre Yang (elected 1); 2. Martin Pritchard (elected 3); 3. Ayor Makur Chuot (elected 4); 4. Dan Caddy (elected 5); 5. Rhys Vallance; 6. Rebeka Marton | 215,054 | 58.72 | +21.50 |
| Liberal | 1. Peter Collier (elected 2); 2. Tjorn Sibma (elected 6); 3. Simon Ehrenfeld; 4. Tim Walton; 5. Michael Mischin | 85,379 | 23.31 | −13.16 |
| Greens | 1. Alison Xamon; 2. Daniel Vujcich; 3. Sarah Newbold | 27,077 | 7.39 | −2.58 |
| Christians | 1. Louis Hildebrandt; 2. Neil Fearis | 6,242 | 1.70 | +0.10 |
| Legalise Cannabis | 1. Max Armstrong-Moore; 2. Fred Mulholland | 5,380 | 1.47 | +1.47 |
| One Nation | 1. Tyler Walsh; 2. Sheila Mundy | 5,069 | 1.38 | −5.08 |
| No Mandatory Vaccination | 1. James Pearce; 2. A. Cirkovic; 3. Sara O'Dal | 4,550 | 1.24 | +1.24 |
| Western Australia | 1. Elizabeth Re; 2. Steven Pynt | 2,669 | 0.73 | +0.13 |
| Animal Justice | 1. Michael Anagno; 2. Stephanie Fry | 2,593 | 0.71 | −0.48 |
| Shooters, Fishers, Farmers | 1. Jan Van Niekerk; 2. Marty Wenham | 2,399 | 0.66 | −0.64 |
| Liberal Democrats | 1. Kate Fantinel; 2. Richard Tait | 1,419 | 0.39 | −0.70 |
| Independent | 1. Rafe Roberts; 2. Carel Husselmann | 1,335 | 0.36 | +0.36 |
| Liberals for Climate | 1. Daithi Gleeson; 2. Paul Holliday | 1,268 | 0.35 | −0.09 |
| WAxit | 1. John Golawski; 2. Aleksandra Sommer | 1,248 | 0.34 | −0.27 |
| Sustainable Australia | 1. Colin Scott; 2. Michael Ferrinda | 974 | 0.27 | +0.27 |
| Daylight Saving | 1. Robert Tucker; 2. Heather Atcheson | 888 | 0.24 | −0.56 |
| Great Australian | 1. Chris Irwin; 2. Ben Tonkin | 721 | 0.20 | +0.20 |
| Health Australia | 1. Sanjeev Gupta; 2. George Helou | 577 | 0.16 | +0.16 |
| | 1. Michael Tucak; 2. John Tucak | 482 | 0.13 | −0.15 |
| Independent | 1. Andrea Randle; 2. Wvendy Chan | 467 | 0.13 | +0.13 |
| Independent | 1. Billy Amesz; 2. Steven Gersbach | 174 | 0.05 | +0.05 |
| Independent | T. Ravichandar | 148 | 0.04 | +0.04 |
| Independent | 1. N. Spada; 2. M. Husselmann | 116 | 0.03 | +0.03 |
| Total formal votes | | 366,229 | 98.49 | +1.40 |
| Informal votes | | 5,633 | 1.51 | −1.40 |
| Turnout | | 371,862 | 86.93 | −0.28 |

=== South Metropolitan ===
2021 Western Australian state election: South Metropolitan
| Party | Candidate | Votes | % | ±% |
|---|---|---|---|---|
| Quota | | 54,302 | | |
| Labor | 1. Sue Ellery (elected 1); 2. Kate Doust (elected 3); 3. Klara Andric (elected 4); 4. Stephen Pratt (elected 5); 5. Victoria Helps; 6. Kelly McManus | 239,248 | 62.94 | +18.08 |
| Liberal | 1. Nick Goiran (elected 2); 2. Michelle Hofmann; 3. Ka-ren Chew; 4. Robert Reid; 5. Nitin Vashisht; 6. Scott Stirling | 67,000 | 17.63 | −7.22 |
| Greens | 1. Brad Pettitt (elected 6); 2. Lynn MacLaren; 3. Daniel Garlett | 26,257 | 6.91 | −2.34 |
| Christians | 1. Warnar Spyker; 2. Sylvia Iradukunda | 7,290 | 1.92 | −0.06 |
| Legalise Cannabis | 1. Moshe Bernstein; 2. Scott Shortland | 6,877 | 1.81 | +1.81 |
| One Nation | 1. Philip Scott; 2. Bradley Dickinson | 3,972 | 1.04 | −5.95 |
| Shooters, Fishers, Farmers | 1. Steven Tonge; 2. Paul Bedford | 3,920 | 1.03 | −0.47 |
| No Mandatory Vaccination | 1. Cam Tinley; 2. Michael Fletcher; 3. Greg Bell | 3,842 | 1.01 | +1.01 |
| Liberal Democrats | 1. Aaron Stonehouse; 2. Harvey Smith; 3. Jared Neaves; 4. Ivan Tomshin; 5. Laurentiu Zamfirescu; 6. Peter Leech | 3,369 | 0.89 | −3.02 |
| Liberals for Climate | 1. Keith Pomeroy; 2. Daniel Herron | 3,262 | 0.86 | +0.49 |
| Animal Justice | 1. Colleen Saporita; 2. Katrina Love | 3,033 | 0.80 | −0.48 |
| Western Australia | 1. Katy Mair; 2. Gavin Waugh | 2,312 | 0.61 | +0.27 |
| Independent | 1. Graham West; 2. Liam Strickland | 1,683 | 0.44 | +0.44 |
| WAxit | 1. Peter McLernon; 2. Jo-Anne Vincent-Barwood | 1,341 | 0.35 | −0.33 |
| Daylight Saving | 1. Amanda Klaj; 2. Craig Curtis | 1,319 | 0.35 | −0.45 |
| Sustainable Australia | 1. Ryan Oostryck; 2. Jane Loveday | 1,169 | 0.31 | +0.31 |
| Great Australian | 1. Samantha Vinci; 2. Susan Hoddinott | 1,097 | 0.29 | +0.29 |
| Socialist Alliance | 1. Marianne Mackay; 2. Dirk Kelly | 948 | 0.25 | −0.14 |
| Health Australia | 1. Michele Castle; 2. Catheryn Wright | 646 | 0.17 | +0.17 |
| Independent | Larry Foley | 397 | 0.10 | +0.10 |
| Independent | 1. Jourdan Kestel; 2. Lee Herridge | 371 | 0.10 | +0.10 |
| Independent | 1. Mark Rowley; 2. Marlie Touchell | 273 | 0.07 | +0.07 |
| Independent | 1. Glen Leslie; 2. Stephen Yarwood | 202 | 0.05 | +0.05 |
| Independent | 1. Stan Francis; 2. Jeremy Lay | 160 | 0.04 | +0.04 |
| Independent | 1. Dave Glossop; 2. Lewis Butto | 112 | 0.03 | +0.03 |
| Independent | Leon Hamilton | 10 | 0.00 | +0.00 |
| Total formal votes | | 380,110 | 98.08 | +0.99 |
| Informal votes | | 7,432 | 1.92 | −0.99 |
| Turnout | | 387,542 | 86.28 | −0.93 |

=== South West ===
2021 Western Australian state election: South West
| Party | Candidate | Votes | % | ±% |
|---|---|---|---|---|
| Quota | | 29,300 | | |
| Labor | 1. Sally Talbot (elected 1); 2. Alannah MacTiernan (elected 3); 3. Jackie Jarvis (elected 4); 4. John Mondy; 5. Ben Dawkins; 6. Kylie Fitzgerald | 114,713 | 55.93 | +19.49 |
| Liberal | 1. Steve Thomas (elected 2); 2. Greg Stocks; 3. Anita Shortland; 4. Hayden Burbidge | 37,736 | 18.40 | −4.28 |
| National | 1. James Hayward (elected 6); 2. Louise Kingston; 3. Rod Pfeiffer | 12,254 | 5.97 | −6.06 |
| Greens | 1. Diane Evers; 2. Donald Clarke; 3. Jodie Moffat | 12,220 | 5.96 | −1.62 |
| Shooters, Fishers, Farmers | 1. Rick Mazza; 2. Russell McCarthy; 3. Ray Hull | 5,178 | 2.52 | −1.59 |
| Legalise Cannabis | 1. Sophia Moermond (elected 5); 2. Nicola Johnson | 4,531 | 2.21 | +2.21 |
| One Nation | 1. Colin Tincknell; 2. Paul Howard; 3. Michael Pelle | 3,841 | 1.87 | −8.76 |
| Christians | 1. Laurence Van der Plas; 2. Joan Albany | 3,782 | 1.84 | +0.15 |
| No Mandatory Vaccination | 1. Keith Bunton; 2. Elisabeth Bluntschli | 2,504 | 1.22 | +1.22 |
| Liberal Democrats | 1. Eli Bernstein; 2. David Fishlock | 2,014 | 0.98 | +0.03 |
| Western Australia | 1. Terri Sharp; 2. Joanne Munro | 1,420 | 0.69 | +0.55 |
| Sustainable Australia | 1. Daniel Minson; 2. Heather Scott | 904 | 0.44 | +0.44 |
| WAxit | 1. Chas Hopkins; 2. Malcolm Gilmour | 810 | 0.39 | +0.20 |
| Animal Justice | 1. Vicki Bailey; 2. Sarah Gould | 798 | 0.39 | −0.40 |
| Health Australia | 1. Justin Zwartkruis; 2. Hayley Green | 493 | 0.24 | +0.24 |
| Great Australian | 1. Nick Robinson; 2. Andy Gleeson | 461 | 0.22 | +0.22 |
| Liberals for Climate | 1. Mark Bentley; 2. Pieter Lottering | 410 | 0.20 | −0.23 |
| Daylight Saving | 1. Garry Spiers; 2. Lizabeth Taylor | 283 | 0.14 | −0.22 |
| Independent | 1. Yasmin Bartlett; 2. Karen Perttula | 242 | 0.12 | +0.12 |
| Independent | Dave Schumacher | 170 | 0.08 | +0.08 |
| Independent | 1. George Seth; 2. Noel Avery | 145 | 0.07 | +0.07 |
| Independent | 1. John Banks; 2. Phillip Spencer | 101 | 0.05 | +0.05 |
| Independent | Bob Burdett | 89 | 0.04 | +0.04 |
| Total formal votes | | 205,099 | 97.92 | +0.83 |
| Informal votes | | 4,357 | 2.08 | −0.83 |
| Turnout | | 209,456 | 86.20 | −1.00 |
