= Candidates of the 2025 Western Australian state election =

This is a list of candidates for the 2025 Western Australian state election. Nominations for candidates and parties officially opened on 6 February and closed on 12 February party candidates, and 13 February for non-party candidates.

== Retiring MPs ==
=== Labor ===
- Lisa Baker MLA (Maylands) – announced 5 March 2024
- Sue Ellery MLC (South Metropolitan) – announced 29 July 2022
- Matthew Hughes MLA (Kalamunda) – announced 9 February 2024
- Bill Johnston MLA (Cannington) – announced 30 November 2023
- Kyle McGinn MLC (Mining and Pastoral) – announced 7 July 2024
- Simon Millman MLA (Mount Lawley) – announced 8 April 2024
- Martin Pritchard MLC (North Metropolitan) – announced 16 May 2024
- John Quigley MLA (Butler) – announced 19 February 2024
- Margaret Quirk MLA (Landsdale) – announced 2 April 2024
- Michelle Roberts MLA (Midland) – announced 16 October 2024
- Jessica Shaw MLA (Swan Hills) – announced 3 June 2024
- Sally Talbot MLC (South West) – announced 5 July 2024
- Chris Tallentire MLA (Thornlie) – announced 26 February 2024
- David Templeman MLA (Mandurah) – announced 17 September 2024
- Peter Tinley MLA (Willagee) – announced 14 March 2024
- Darren West MLC (Agricultural) – announced 8 June 2024

=== Liberal ===
- Peter Collier MLC (North Metropolitan) – did not nominate for endorsement
- Donna Faragher MLC (East Metropolitan) – announced 10 January 2024
- David Honey MLA (Cottesloe) – lost preselection 10 February 2024

=== National ===
- Martin Aldridge MLC (Agricultural) – announced 16 April 2024
- Mia Davies MLA (Central Wheatbelt) – announced 27 January 2023
- Colin de Grussa MLC (Agricultural) – announced 8 June 2024

=== Independent ===
- Wilson Tucker MLC (Mining and Pastoral) – announced 12 February 2025

== Legislative Assembly ==
Incumbent members are shown in bold text. Successful candidates are highlighted in the relevant colour.

Electorate	Held by	Labor	Liberal	Nationals	Greens	Christians	Legalise Cannabis	One Nation	Others
Albany	Labor	**Rebecca Stephens**	Thomas Brough	Scott Leary	Lynn MacLaren	Gerrit Ballast	Philip Arnatt	Quintin Bisschoff	Synjon Anstee-Brook (SFF); Mario Lionetti (Ind.)
Armadale	Labor	**Tony Buti**	Jason McNamara		Shelley Harrington	Arthur Kleyn		Elizabeth Ierardi	C Ling (SPPK)
Balcatta	Labor	**David Michael**	James Helliwell		Trevor Don	Wesley D'Costa	Christopher Cole	David Potter	Robert Hollier (SFF)
Baldivis	Labor	**Reece Whitby**	Dylan Mbano		Annabelle Newbury	Yvette Holmes	Mark Charles	Dylan Vermeulen	Phillip da Silva (SFF)
Bassendean	Labor	**Dave Kelly**	Ash Kumar		Callan Gray	Dave Kingston		Chris Fenech	Renée McLennan (Ind.)
Bateman	Labor	**Kim Giddens**	Nitin Vashisht	Donna Gordin	Juanita Doorey	Kirsty Robbie		Michael Mabood	Anahita Ghassemifar (Lbt.); Colleen Saporita (AJP); Tony Stokes (Ind.)
Belmont	Labor	**Cassie Rowe**	Biju Anthony		Helen Olivieri	Nathaneal Yap		Liviu Filip Tomulescu	
Bibra Lake	Labor	Sook Yee Lai	Atul Garg		Robyn Walsh	Leon Yeap	Bradley Gibb	Bradley Dickinson	Lisa Griffiths (Ind.); Michael Separovich (Ind.)
Bicton	Labor	**Lisa O'Malley**	Christopher Dowson	Bill Koul	Adam Bennett			Tim Smith	
Bunbury	Labor	**Don Punch**	Heather Reid	Codee-Lee Down	Patricia Perks	Boyd Davey	John Bell	Shane Myles	Cameron van Veen (SFF)
Butler	Labor	Lorna Clarke	Rikki Baulch		Matt Price	Vanessa Montgomery	Ramon Grandos	Mark Powley	
Cannington	Labor	Ron Sao	Bruce Henderson		Eric Hayward	Mark Staer			
Carine	Labor	**Paul Lilburne**	Liam Staltari		Lisa Hindmarsh	Sally Bone			
Central Wheatbelt	National	Rebecca Atkinson	Lance French	Lachlan Hunter	Peter Leam	Les Holten		Peter Lines	
Churchlands	Labor	**Christine Tonkin**	Basil Zempilas		Caroline McLean	James Rai			Tian Carrie-Wilson (Ind. FUSION); Anthony Fels (Ind.); Lisa Thornton (Ind.)
Cockburn	Labor	**David Scaife**	Brunetta Di Russo		Brendan Sturcke	Gopi Veloo	Christopher Rennick		
Collie-Preston	Labor	**Jodie Hanns**	Matt Sharp	Cameron Parsons	Robert Mann	Norm Wiese	Paul Gullan	Jess Adams	Joshua Wray Coffey (SFF)
Cottesloe	Liberal	Amy Astill	Sandra Brewer		Heidi Hardisty		Jessica Yu		Rachel Horncastle (Ind.)
Darling Range	Labor	**Hugh Jones**	Paul Mansfield	Morgan Byas	Dominic Firmager	Quintin Kleyn	Peter Roberts	Liam Heerema	
Dawesville	Labor	**Lisa Munday**	Owen Mulder		Susanne Godden	Kerry Stewart	Sharlene Mavor	Wayne Fuller	Sam Walker (SFF)
Forrestfield	Labor	**Stephen Price**	George Tilbury	Ian Blayney	River Clarke	Jacob Morrow	Steve Emmons	Peter Nicholls	Chris Munro (SFF)
Fremantle	Labor	**Simone McGurk**	Serena Kipling		Felicity Townsend	Peter Watt	David Foley		Natashia Boland (AJP); Kate Hulett (Ind.); Nicoletta Raffaelli (SFF)
Geraldton	Labor	**Lara Dalton**	Tim Milnes	Kirrilee Warr	Madeline Doncon	Eugenie Harris	David Van Beek		Aaron Horsman (Ind.); Jack Ostle (SFF); Shane van Styn (Ind.)
Girrawheen	Labor	**Meredith Hammat**	Jacques Lombard		Evan Beasley	Tracey Purser	Nathan Kirk		Kim Mubarak (Ind.)
Hillarys	Labor	**Caitlin Collins**	Lisa Olsson		Nicholas D’Alonzo	Dwight Randalls			
Jandakot	Labor	Stephen Pratt	Nicole Robins		Ariana Carot Collins	Marianne Pretorious		Igor Mironenko	Alan Strahan (SFF)
Joondalup	Labor	**Emily Hamilton**	Michael Dudek		Brian Sova	Trevor Bartley	Sam Law		Nicole Butler (Ind.); Neil Jensen (AJP); Michael Kannis (SFF); M Waghorn (SPPK)
Kalamunda	Labor	Karen Beale	Adam Hort	Lisa Logan	Janelle Sewell	Shemma Timney	Penelope Young	Robert Critchley	George Taylor (SFF)
Kalgoorlie	Labor	**Ali Kent**	Rowena Olsen	Tony Herron	Donald Clarke	Ross Paterson	Kelly Malcolm	Jordan Whitten	Stefan Colagiuri (SFF); Kyran O'Donnell (Ind.)
Kimberley	Labor	**Divina D'Anna**		Millie Hills	Jaala Ozies	Zoe Golding			Darren Spackman (Ind. Liberal)
Kingsley	Labor	**Jessica Stojkovski**	Scott Edwardes		Sheridan Young	Josephine Bartley		Natalie Whitten	Adam Johnson (SFF); Martyn Shipton (Ind.)
Kwinana	Labor	**Roger Cook**	Cameron Foord		Jody Freeman	Vizia Daniel	Paul Mavor	Andrej Pajewski	Tim Hamilton (SFF); Paul Howard (Ind.); Esther Forest (AJP)
Landsdale	Labor	Daniel Pastorelli	Marizane Moore		Michaela King	Candice Parsons			Ziggi Murphy (Ind.)
Mandurah	Labor	Rhys Williams	Kaye Seeber		Chance Bruening	Lenka Pesch		Nicholas Gemmell	C Hill (SPPK)
Maylands	Labor	Dan Bull	Paula Tan		Caroline Perks	Gaye Burnett			Peter Cornish (Lbt.)
Midland	Labor	Steve Catania	Mike Matich		Sarah Nielsen-Harvey	Brian Warburton	Jane Southworth	Julie Cottam	Sarah Howlett (Ind.); Delia Richardson (AJP)
Mid-West (Note: Mid-West was created in 2023 as part of a redistribution. The seat is notionally held by the National Party.)	National	Jenna Denton	**Merome Beard**	**Shane Love**	Chilla Bulbeck	Michael Reymond	Shannon Yeh	Mark Burns	Chrystal Sclater (Lbt.)
Mindarie	Labor	**Mark Folkard**	Paul Miles		Scott McCarthy	Patrick Thomas	Lee Hunt	John Burton	Penelope Hall (AJP); Christian Mellon (SFF)
Morley	Labor	**Amber-Jade Sanderson**	Aswath Chavittupara		Kaelin Abrahams	Giulio Di Somma		Conor Doyle	Cameron Yates (SFF)
Mount Lawley	Labor	Frank Paolino	Michelle Sutherland		Lucy Nicol	Nathaly Key	Leo Treasure	Graeme Morrison	S Singleton (SFF)
Murray-Wellington	Labor	**Robyn Clarke**	David Bolt	Paul Gillet	Vince Puccio	Deonne Kingsford		Lucas Zwikielberg	
Nedlands	Labor	Mary Monkhouse	Jonathan Huston		Viv Glance	Laura Yow		Alex Ironside	Peter Dunne (Ind.); Jonathan Hippisley (Ind.); Cilla de Lacey (Ind.); Rosemarie de Vries (Ind.)
Oakford	Labor	**Yaz Mubarakai**	Tait Marston		Heather Lonsdale	Jiby Joy	Srdjan Lazarevic	Mandy Dhandli	Ronald Lean (SFF)
Perth	Labor	**John Carey**	Sean Butler		Simone Springer				Grant Stewart (AJP)
Pilbara	Labor	**Kevin Michel**	Amanda Kailis	Kieran Dart	Niels Glahn-Bertelsen		Georgina Wilkinson	Brenton Johannsen	Leanne Lockyer (SFF)
Riverton	Labor	**Jags Krishnan**	Amanda Spencer-Teo		Tim Hall	Joan Lee		Flint Adarne	
Rockingham	Labor	**Magenta Marshall**	Hayley Edwards		Robert Delves	Tim Pearce	Phil Lesley	Cristina Oregioni	Sarah Gould (AJP); Jason Keane (Ind.)
Roe	National	Brad Willis	Marie O'Dea	**Peter Rundle**	Dave Worth	Diana Reymond		Ethann Sinclair	
Scarborough	Labor	**Stuart Aubrey**	Damian Kelly	Elizabeth Re	Mark Twiss				Emily Stokes (AJP)
Secret Harbour	Labor	**Paul Papalia**	Mark Jones		Tamsyn Heynes	Bob Burdett	Jim Matters	Liam Hall	Elizabeth Storer (AJP)
Southern River	Labor	**Terry Healy**	Sudhir Chowdhary		Angela Hecquet	Alvin Mathew	Graham Pereira	Ingrid Parkin	Glen Dewhurst (Ind.); Caleb Thomas (SFF); Simon Simson (Ind.)
South Perth	Labor	**Geoff Baker**	Bronwyn Waugh	Jeremy Miles	Carl Evers	Rachel Zhuang			Andrew Quin (Ind.)
Swan Hills	Labor	Michelle Maynard	Rod Henderson	Ben Giblett	Chris Poulton	Magdeleen Strauss		Scott Wilkinson	Ross Williamson (SFF)
Thornlie	Labor	Colleen Egan	Mahesh Arumugam		Adam Razak	Madeleine Goiran	Fred Mulholland	Timothy Larcombe	Kevin McDonald (Ind.)
Vasse	Liberal	Evan Lewis	**Libby Mettam**		Mia Krasenstein	Stephen Cox	Shelly Leech	Steve Kefalinos	
Victoria Park	Labor	**Hannah Beazley**	Andra Biondi		Jack Gordon-Manley	Linda Watson			Robert Vlaar (AJP)
Wanneroo	Labor	**Sabine Winton**	Joshua Kingshott		Martin Dupont	Henk Holtzhausen	Kunal Parbat		Trevor Ruwoldt (SFF)
Warren-Blackwood	Labor	**Jane Kelsbie**	Wade de Campo	Bevan Eatts	Julie Marsh	Martin Hartigan	Aaron Peet	Stephen O'Connor	Paul Da Silva (SFF)
West Swan	Labor	**Rita Saffioti**	Amninder Saini		Ben Hermann	Dara Connors	Elliot Taylor	Cristina Pomana	

== Legislative Council ==
Following the 2021 state election, the McGowan Labor government introduced changes to the Legislative Council's voting system, removing the six multi-member electoral regions that had been in place since 1989. Beginning in 2025, all members are elected to a statewide constituency, increasing from 36 members to 37 members. The members are elected to a statewide electorate using single transferable voting and a quota of 1/37th (or 2.63%), replacing group voting tickets.

Incumbent members are shown in bold text. Successful candidates are highlighted in the relevant colour.

Sustainable Australia	SFF	Liberal	Nationals	Christians	Greens	Labor
1. Daniel Minson; 2. Julie Matheson; 3. Melissa Wood; 4. Ann Choong; 5. Colin Scott; 6. Prok Vasilyev; 7. Karen Oborn; 8. David Smyth; 9. Jane Loveday; 10. Ryan Oostryck	1. Stuart Ostle; 2. Karrie Louden; 3. Peter Raffaelli; 4. Jack Carmody; 5. Clinton Thomas	1. Simon Ehrenfeld; 2. **Nick Goiran**; 3. **Steve Thomas**; 4. Phil Twiss; 5. **Steve Martin**; 6. **Neil Thomson**; 7. **Tjorn Sibma**; 8. Michelle Hofmann; 9. Michelle Boylan; 10. Anthony Spagnolo; 11. Kathryn Jackson; 12. Dean Wicken; 13. Amanda-Sue Markham; 14. Ka-Ren Chew; 15. Xavier Garbin; 16. Suzanne Migdale; 17. Randall Starling; 18. Gabi Ghasseb	1. Julie Freeman; 2. Rob Horstman; 3. Julie Kirby; 4. Heidi Tempra; 5. Ben Simpkins; 6. Andrew McRae; 7. Debbie Carson; 8. Peter Gordon; 9. Leonie Lemmey; 10. Jemma August	1. Maryka Groenewald; 2. Mike Crichton; 3. Louis Hildebrandt; 4. Gloria Watkins; 5. Neil Fearis	1. **Brad Pettitt**; 2. Sophie McNeill; 3. Tim Clifford; 4. Jess Beckerling; 5. Diane Evers; 6. Clint Uink; 7. Simone Collins; 8. Alex Wallace; 9. Verity Ives	1. **Jackie Jarvis**; 2. **Matthew Swinbourn**; 3. **Stephen Dawson**; 4. **Kate Doust**; 5. **Pierre Yang**; 6. **Samantha Rowe**; 7. **Alanna Clohesy**; 8. **Ayor Makur Chuot**; 9. Andrew O'Donnell; 10. Katrina Stratton; 11. Lauren Cayoun; 12. **Klara Andric**; 13. Parwinder Kaur; 14. **Sandra Carr**; 15. **Dan Caddy**; 16. Klasey Hirst; 17. **Peter Foster**; 18. Mat Dixon; 19. **Lorna Harper**; 20. **Rosetta Sahanna**; 21. Henny Smith; 22. **Shelley Payne**; 23. Eloyise Braskic; 24. Claire Comrie; 25. Jess Cunnold; 26. Ebony Short; 27. Shenae Hunter; 28. Ashley Buck; 29. Melinda Perks; 30. Gareth Thomas; 31. Daniella Simatos; 32. Emily Bailey; 33. Tim Grey-Smith; 34. Mark Fahey; 35. Maitham Al-Alyawy; 36. Adelaide Kidson; 37. Susan Pethick
Animal Justice	Libertarian	Stop Pedophiles	Legalise Cannabis	One Nation	Independent (Note: Group M on the ballot paper is a grouping of five independent candidates, who will have both a group voting box above the line and individual listing below the line. There are also five independent candidates who are not part of the group and will only be listed below the line.)	Ungrouped
1. Amanda Dorn; 2. Nathalie Bergon; 3. Michael Anagno; 4. Emma Madle; 5. Jemma Fittock	1. Ryan Burns; 2. Gary Nicol; 3. Jake McCoull; 4. Dean Covich; 5. Angela Williams; 6. Yan Loh; 7. Trevor Barnes	1. H. Dolan; 2. A. Wilson; 3. A. Middleton; 4. Georges Dib; 5. K. McLennan; 6. Jataia Peart; 7. Sean King; 8. Tiffany Marks; 9. Peter Smith; 10. Tammy Ward; 11. R. Kobryn-Coletti; 12. H. Grave; 13. M. Nielsen; 14. B. Baker; 15. T. Hewson; 16. C. Smith; 17. S. James	1. **Brian Walker**; 2. Melissa D'Ath; 3. Craig Buchanan; 4. Frances Barns; 5. William Safar; 6. Jason Meotti; 7. Rob Caruso; 8. Fiona Caruso	1. Rod Caddies; 2. Phil Scott; 3. Parminder Singh; 4. Constantin Ortheil; 5. Kat White	1. **Sophia Moermond**; 2. **Louise Kingston**; 3. **Aussie Trump** (Note: Trump was previously elected as Ben Dawkins, and changed his name shortly before nominating.); 4. Adrian Perrot; 5. Tony Ball	Sudhir Sudhir; Christiane Smith; Jennifer McRae; Peter McLernon; Steve Walker

== Disendorsements and resignations ==
Date	Party	Candidate	Seat	Details
8 June 2024	National	Jonathan Shack	South Perth	Withdrew candidacy for unknown reasons.
21 June 2024	National	Louise Kingston	Legislative Council	Left the Nationals after alleged bullying by party leadership.
22 August 2024	Liberal	Ben Cornel	Mount Lawley	Withdrew candidacy due to "personal and professional reasons".
31 August 2024	Liberal	Kyran O'Donnell	Legislative Council	Withdrew candidacy in order to run as an independent in the lower house seat of Kalgoorlie.
16 October 2024	Liberal	James Hall	Mandurah	Resigned after past racist and xenophobic social media remarks Hall had made emerged.
7 December 2024	Liberal	Lance French	Central Wheatbelt	Disendorsed after initially refusing to unfollow a white nationalist on social media. Later re-endorsed.
6 January 2025	Labor	Daniel Morrison-Bird	Thornlie	Withdrew candidacy as he believed "now is not the right time for me to enter politics".
10 February 2025	National	Edward Richards	Belmont	Disendorsed for conspiracist social media posts.
14 February 2025	National	Wayne Sweetman	Girrawheen	Withdrew candidacy for unknown reasons.
14 February 2025	National	James McLagan	Nedlands	Withdrew candidacy for unknown reasons.
20 February 2025	Liberal	Darren Spackman	Kimberley	Forced to resign after racist social media remarks emerged and further comments through an interview.
