= Candidates of the 2008 Western Australian state election =

This article provides details on the candidates that stood at the 2008 Western Australian state election.

== Retiring MPs ==
The following MPs did not contest the election.

=== Labor ===
- Kim Chance, MLC for Agricultural.
- Judy Edwards, MLA for Maylands.
- Nick Griffiths, MLC for East Metropolitan.
- Sheila McHale, MLA for Kenwick.
- Sheila Mills, MLC for South Metropolitan.
- Jaye Radisich, MLA for Swan Hills.
- Fred Riebeling, MLA for North West Coastal.

=== Liberal ===
- Matt Birney, MLA for Kalgoorlie.
- George Cash, MLC for North Metropolitan.
- Bruce Donaldson, MLC for Agricultural.
- Ray Halligan, MLC for North Metropolitan.
- Katie Hodson-Thomas, MLA for Carine.
- Barbara Scott, MLC for South Metropolitan.

=== Independent ===
- Shelley Archer, MLC for Mining and Pastoral (last elected as a Labor candidate).
- Bob Kucera, MLA for Yokine (last elected as a Labor candidate).
- Paul Omodei, MLA for Warren-Blackwood (last elected as a Liberal candidate).

== Legislative Assembly ==
Incumbent members are shown in bold text. Successful candidates are highlighted in the relevant colour.

| Electorate | Held by | Labor candidate | Liberal candidate | National candidate | Greens candidate | CDP candidate | Other candidates |
|---|---|---|---|---|---|---|---|
| Albany | Liberal | **Peter Watson** | Andrew Partington | Sam Harma | Diane Evers | Justin Moseley | Colin Pyle (FFP) |
| Alfred Cove | Independent | Catherine Barratt | Chris Back | | Michael Bennett | Stephen Wardell-Johnson | **Janet Woollard** (Ind) |
| Armadale | Labor | **Alannah MacTiernan** | Steven Innes | | Caroline Wielinga | Kevin Swarts | |
| Balcatta | Labor | **John Kobelke** | Chris Hatton | | Irma Lachmund | Peter Schofield | Inge George (FFP) |
| Bassendean | Labor | **Martin Whitely** | Ben Smith | | Jennie Carter | Paul Mewhor | |
| Bateman | Liberal | Tony Stokes | **Christian Porter** | | Andrea Callaghan | Ka-ren Chew | Won-Sik Choi (Ind) |
| Belmont | Labor | **Eric Ripper** | Edward Richards | | Louise Judge | Tasman Gilbert | John Gleeson (Ind); John Yarrow (FFP) |
| Blackwood-Stirling | National | Ray Phillips | Wade DeCampo | **Terry Redman** | Luke Peterson | Graham Lawn | Stephen Carson (FFP); Ken Gunson (Ind); Kevin Smith (Ind) |
| Bunbury | Labor | Peter MacFarlane | **John Castrilli** | | Peter Eckersley | Edward Dabrowski | Mandy Roberts (FFP) |
| Cannington | Labor | Bill Johnston | Ryan Chorley | | Christine Cunningham | Mark Staer | |
| Carine | Liberal | James Benson-Lidholm | Tony Krsticevic | | Ross Copeland | Henri Chew | Peter Rose (FFP); Bill Stewart (Ind); Wayne Thompson (Ind) |
| Central Wheatbelt | National | Gerry Sturman | Stephen Strange | **Brendon Grylls** | Yvonne Dols | Ross Patterson | Judy Sudholz (CEC) |
| Churchlands | Independent | Sinisa Krstic | | | George Crisp | | **Liz Constable** (Ind) |
| Cockburn | Labor | **Fran Logan** | Donald Barrett | | Andrew Sullivan | | Mary Jenkins (Ind) |
| Collie-Preston | Labor | **Mick Murray** | **Steve Thomas** | | Richard Chapman | Wayne Barnett | Keith Hopper (FFP) |
| Cottesloe | Liberal | Dave Hume | **Colin Barnett** | | Greg Boland | Pat Seymour | |
| Darling Range | Labor | Lisa Griffiths | **Tony Simpson** | | Denise Hardie | Rachel Cabrera | |
| Dawesville | Liberal | Marion Blair | **Kim Hames** | | Rebecca Brown | Mike Sutton-Smith | Roger Blakeway (CEC); Andrew Newhouse (FFP) |
| Eyre | Liberal | John Keogh | **Graham Jacobs** | Suzie Williams | Linda Parker | | Arthur Harvey (CEC) |
| Forrestfield | Labor | Andrew Waddell | Nathan Morton | | Owen Davies | Joel Hammen | Lisa Saladine (FFP) |
| Fremantle | Labor | **Jim McGinty** | Brian Christie | | Adele Carles | Julie Hollett | Andriette du Plessis (FFP) |
| Geraldton | Liberal | **Shane Hill** | Ian Blayney | Andrew Short | Adam Volkerts | Philip Sprigg | Jane Foreman (FFP) |
| Girrawheen | Labor | **Margaret Quirk** | John Halligan | | Tamara Desiatov | | |
| Gosnells | Labor | Chris Tallentire | Chris Fernandez | | Luke Edmonds | Madeleine Goiran | Dave Bolt (FFP) |
| Hillarys | Liberal | Kym Endersby | **Rob Johnson** | | Barry Redhead | Norman Henley | Moyna Rapp (FFP) |
| Jandakot | Labor | Anne Wood | Joe Francis | | Serena Breadmore | Bill Heggers | Damon Fowler (FFP) |
| Joondalup | Labor | **Tony O'Gorman** | Milly Zuvela | | Anibeth Desierto | Margaret Laundy | Nathan Clifford (FFP) |
| Kalamunda | Liberal | Juliana Plummer | **John Day** | | Toni Warden | Rob Merrells | Ian Hopkinson (FFP) |
| Kalgoorlie | Liberal | Mathew Cuomo | Nathaniel James | Tony Crook | Andy Huntley | | **John Bowler** (Ind) |
| Kimberley | Labor | **Carol Martin** | Ruth Webb-Smith | John McCourt | Annabelle Sandes | | James Ockerby (CEC) |
| Kingsley | Labor | **Judy Hughes** | Andrea Mitchell | | Diana MacTiernan | Bronwyn Phipson | Frank Hultgren (FFP) |
| Kwinana | Labor | Roger Cook | Alexander Bellotti | | Dawn Jecks | | Carol Adams (Ind); Malcolm George (FFP); Peter Lambert (Ind) |
| Mandurah | Labor | **David Templeman** | Leslie Atkins | | Clare Nunan | Michelle Shave | Keith Hallam (CEC); Rhonda Hamersley (FFP) |
| Maylands | Labor | Lisa Baker | Ainslie Gatt | | Hsien Harper | Dunstan Hartley | |
| Midland | Labor | **Michelle Roberts** | Peter McDowell | | Caz Bowman | Lukas Butler | |
| Mindarie | Labor | **John Quigley** | Murray McLennan | | Johannes Herrmann | Amanda Varley | Daniel Storey (FFP) |
| Moore | Liberal | Peter Johnson | **Gary Snook** | **Grant Woodhams** | Des Pike | Bernie Wallace | Boyd Davey (FFP); Norman Gay (CEC); David Shier (Ind) |
| Morley | Labor | Reece Whitby | Ian Britza | | Sally Palmer | Andrew Partington | **John D'Orazio** (Ind); Azeem Shah (Ind) |
| Mount Lawley | Labor | Karen Brown | Michael Sutherland | | Chris Dickinson | Paul Connelly | Kay Warwick (FFP) |
| Murray-Wellington | Liberal | Anthony Marinovich | **Murray Cowper** | Michael Rose | Deni Fuller | Vivian Hall | Alycia Bermingham (Ind); David Bolt (FFP); Kevin Cloghan (Ind); Brian McCarthy (CEC) |
| Nedlands | Liberal | Colin Cochrane | Bill Marmion | | Lee Hemsley | Gail Forder | Brian Langenberg (FFP); **Sue Walker** (Ind) |
| Nollamara | Labor | Janine Freeman | Trent Charlton-Maughan | | Glen George | Marty Firth | |
| North West | Labor | Vince Catania | Rod Sweetman | Tom Day | Peter Shaw | | Lex Fullarton (Ind) |
| Ocean Reef | Labor | Louise Durack | Albert Jacob | | Justin Wood | Kevin Mullen | Frederick Hay (FFP) |
| Perth | Labor | **John Hyde** | Chris Edwards | | Jonathan Hallett | Guennadi Moukine | |
| Pilbara | Labor | **Tom Stephens** | Rosemary Vrancic | Alan Cochrane | Kelly Howlett | | Joan Foley (FFP) |
| Riverton | Labor | **Tony McRae** | Mike Nahan | | Sol Hanna | Daniel Ossevoort | Christopher Boots (Ind); Joy Drennan (FFP) |
| Rockingham | Labor | **Mark McGowan** | David Simpson | | James Mumme | | Rob Totten (CEC) |
| Scarborough | Liberal | Scott Blackwell | Liza Harvey | | Sonja Lundie-Jenkins | Jenny Whateley | Jim McCourt (FFP); Elizabeth Re (Ind) |
| South Perth | Liberal | Leena Michael | **John McGrath** | | Ros Harman | | Frank Hough (Ind); Jim Grayden (Ind); Karen McDonald (FFP) |
| Southern River | Labor | **Paul Andrews** | Peter Abetz | | Nicola Wiseman | Scott Kuipers | Renise Judge (FFP) |
| Swan Hills | Labor | Graham Giffard | Frank Alban | | Jenni Bowman | Keith Blok | Craig Watson (FFP) |
| Vasse | Liberal | Marilyn Elson | **Troy Buswell** | | Mitchella Hutchins | Gail Gifford | |
| Victoria Park | Labor | **Ben Wyatt** | Benjamin Travia | | Kim Lisson | Saskia Matthews | James Olsen (FFP) |
| Wagin | National | Douglas Melville | Steve Martin | **Terry Waldron** | Adrian Price | Jacky Young | Jean Robinson (CEC) |
| Wanneroo | Labor | **Dianne Guise** | Paul Miles | | Heather Aquilina | Mary Birch | Rod Grasso (FFP); Russell Sewell (Ind) |
| Warnbro | Labor | **Paul Papalia** | Shane Bathgate | | Colin Booth | | Matt Pollock (FFP) |
| West Swan | Labor | Rita Saffioti | Rod Henderson | | Michael Boswell | Barbara Butler | Chris Fayle (Ind) |
| Willagee | Labor | **Alan Carpenter** | Matt Taylor | | Robert Delves | | |

== Legislative Council ==
Six candidates are elected in each region. Incumbent members listed in bold. Tickets that elected at least one MLC are highlighted in the relevant colour. Successful candidates are identified by an asterisk (*).

=== Agricultural Region ===
| Labor candidates | Liberal candidates | National candidates | Greens candidates | CDP candidates | Family First candidates |
|---|---|---|---|---|---|
| 1. **Matt Benson-Lidholm***; 2. Darren West; 3. Vicky Peterson; 4. Alan McCallum | 1. **Brian Ellis***; 2. Jim Chown*; 3. Chris Wilkins; 4. Jane Mouritz; 5. Jamie Falls | 1. Max Trenorden*; 2. Philip Gardiner*; 3. Mia Davies*; 4. Martin Aldridge; 5. Cathy Wood | 1. Dee Margetts; 2. Paul Connolly | 1. Mac Forsyth; 2. Lachlan Dunjey | 1. **Anthony Fels**; 2. Felly Chandra |
| CEC candidates | Group B candidates | Other candidates | | | |
| 1. Stuart Smith; 2. Chris Pepper | 1. Shelly Posey; 2. Valerie Tan | Chris Dodoff (NCP); Ross Paravicini (ON) | | | |

=== East Metropolitan Region ===
| Labor candidates | Liberal candidates | National candidates | Greens candidates | CDP candidates | Family First candidates |
|---|---|---|---|---|---|
| 1. Jock Ferguson*; 2. **Ljiljanna Ravlich***; 3. Linda Savage; 4. Gary Carson; 5. Carolyn Burton; 6. Craig Comrie | 1. **Helen Morton***; 2. **Donna Faragher***; 3. Alyssa Hayden*; 4. Stephen Blizard; 5. Darryl Trease; 6. Guy Simpson | 1. Sean Wood; 2. Kevin Mangini | 1. Alison Xamon*; 2. Steve Wolff; 3. Damian Douglas-Meyer | 1. Dwight Randall; 2. Gerard Goiran | 1. Stephen Bolt; 2. Symia Hopkinson |
| CEC candidates | Other candidates | | | | |
| 1. Neil Vincent; 2. Theresa Passmore | Conor Day (DSP); James Hopkinson (ON); Tom Hoyer (Ind); Richard Nash (Ind); John Tucak (Ind) | | | | |

=== Mining and Pastoral Region ===
| Labor candidates | Liberal candidates | National candidates | Greens candidates | CDP candidates | CEC candidates | Other candidates |
|---|---|---|---|---|---|---|
| 1. **Jon Ford***; 2. Helen Bullock*; 3. Jim Murie; 4. Jodie Lynch; 5. Mike Anderton; 6. Terry Healy | 1. **Norman Moore***; 2. **Ken Baston***; 3. Mark Lewis; 4. Isabella Scott; 5. Ross Wood; 6. Alan Dungey | 1. **Wendy Duncan***; 2. Dave Grills; 3. Alan Keeling; 4. Garry McGlinn | 1. Robin Chapple*; 2. Kate Davis | 1. Roger Mansell; 2. Peter Watt | 1. Lorraine Thomas; 2. Orm Girvan | Pat Cunneen (DSP); David Larsen (NCP); David Kidd (FFP); Gavin Ness (ON) |

=== North Metropolitan Region ===
| Labor candidates | Liberal candidates | National candidates | Greens candidates | CDP candidates | Family First candidates |
|---|---|---|---|---|---|
| 1. **Ken Travers***; 2. **Ed Dermer***; 3. Tim Daly; 4. Kelly Shay; 5. Iqbal Samnakay; 6. Bill Leadbetter | 1. **Peter Collier***; 2. Michael Mischin*; 3. Liz Behjat*; 4. Colin Edwardes; 5. Judith Dowson | 1. Joanne Burges; 2. Cheryl Fahey | 1. **Giz Watson***; 2. Cameron Poustie; 3. Brenda Roy | 1. Ruth Nicholls; 2. David Kingston | 1. Trona Young; 2. Doug Croker |
| CEC candidates | Group A candidates | Group F candidates | Other candidates | | |
| 1. Ron McLean; 2. Paul Augustson | 1. Brian Peachey; 2. Joseph Nardizzi | 1. John Eyden; 2. Paul Young | George Gault (ON); Julie Gray (Ind); Douglas Greypower (Ind); Eugene Hands (Ind); Christopher King (Ind); Ben MacKinnon (DSP); Wally Morris (Ind) | | |

=== South Metropolitan Region ===
| Labor candidates | Liberal candidates | National candidates | Greens candidates | CDP candidates | Family First candidates |
|---|---|---|---|---|---|
| 1. **Sue Ellery***; 2. **Kate Doust***; 3. Fiona Henderson; 4. **Batong Pham**; 5. Jack de Groot; 6. Andrew Vitolins | 1. **Simon O'Brien***; 2. Nick Goiran*; 3. Phil Edman*; 4. Donna Gordin; 5. John Jamieson; 6. Michelle Verkerk | 1. Hilary Wheater; 2. Peter Wahlsten | 1. Lynn MacLaren*; 2. Scott Ryan | 1. Brent Tremain; 2. Linda Brewer | 1. Frank Lindsey; 2. Bev Custers |
| CEC candidates | Group C candidates | Group F candidates | Other candidates | | |
| 1. Paul Ellison; 2. Barry Buschen | 1. Christopher Oughton; 2. Huw Grossmith | 1. Eric Miller; 2. Yolanda Nardizzi | Jeffrey Gidman (DSP); Neil Gilmour (ON); Steve Walker (Ind) | | |

=== South West Region ===
| Labor candidates | Liberal candidates | National candidates | Greens candidates | CDP candidates | Family First candidates |
|---|---|---|---|---|---|
| 1. **Sally Talbot***; 2. **Adele Farina***; 3. John Mondy; 4. Wendy Perdon; 5. Christopher Hossen; 6. Elizabeth Nedela | 1. **Robyn McSweeney***; 2. **Nigel Hallett***; 3. **Barry House***; 4. Paul Fitzpatrick; 5. Dennis Wellington; 6. Ross Ryan | 1. Colin Holt*; 2. Patricia Hughes | 1. **Paul Llewellyn**; 2. Rae McPherson | 1. John Lewis; 2. Ray Moran | 1. Dan Sullivan; 2. Linda Rose |
| CEC candidates | Group E candidates | Other candidates | | | |
| 1. Ian Tuffnell; 2. Allan Dilley | 1. Elaine Green; 2. Terry O'Leary | Brian Burns (ON); Filip Guglielmana (Ind); Kara Pascoe (DSP); Judy Pearce (NCP) | | | |
