= Mark Lewis (politician) =

Australian politician

Member of the Legislative Council of Western Australia
- In office 22 May 2013 – 21 May 2017 Serving with Baston, Boydell, Chapple, Dawson, Grills
- Constituency: Mining and Pastoral Region

Personal details
- Born: Mark William Lewis; 27 November 1957 (age 68) Cunnamulla, Queensland, Australia
- Party: Liberal

Mark William Lewis (born 27 November 1957) is an Australian politician who was a Liberal Party member of the Legislative Council of Western Australia from 2013 to 2017, representing the Mining and Pastoral Region. He was made a minister in the government of Colin Barnett in September 2016.

Lewis was born in Cunnamulla, a small town in South West Queensland. He was raised on a farming and cattle property, and went to a boarding school in Rockhampton before going on to study animal production and health at Gatton Agricultural College (now part of the University of Queensland). After graduating, he moved to the Channel Country, where he worked for the veterinary services branch of the state government's Department of Primary Industries. In 1996, Lewis moved to Carnarvon, Western Australia, to work for that state's Department of Agriculture and Food. He first ran for parliament at the 2008 state election, running in third place on the Liberal ticket in Mining and Pastoral but losing out to other candidates. Following the retirement of Norman Moore (the lead Liberal candidate in 2008), Lewis was elevated to second place on the ticket for the 2013 election, and was elected. In September 2016, following the resignation of Dean Nalder, he was appointed Minister for Agriculture and Food.
