= Stephen Dawson (politician) =

Australian politician

The Honourable Stephen Dawson MLC
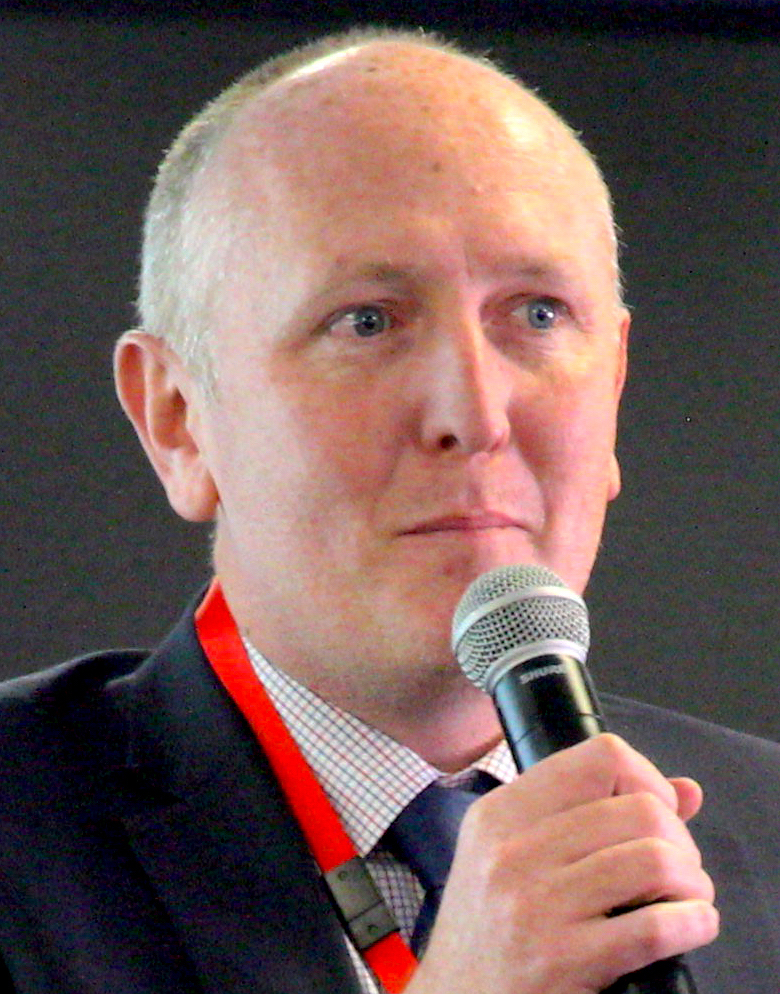

Member of the Legislative Council of Western Australia
- Incumbent
- Assumed office 22 May 2013 Serving with Baston, Boydell, Chapple, Grills, Lewis
- Constituency: Mining and Pastoral

Personal details
- Born: Stephen Noel Dawson; 30 July 1975 (age 51) Dublin, Ireland
- Party: Labor
- Website: www.stephendawsonmlc.com.au

Stephen Noel Dawson (born 30 July 1975) is an Australian politician who has been a Labor Party member of the Legislative Council of Western Australia since 2013, representing the Mining and Pastoral Region. He is the current Minister for Emergency Services, Minister for Innovation and the Digital Economy, Minister for Medical Research, Science , Minister assisting the Minister for State and Industry Development, Jobs and Trade, and Deputy Leader of the Government in the Legislative Council.

== Early life ==
Dawson was born in Dublin, Ireland. As a child, he attended a Gaelscoil (Irish Gaelic immersion school), with English being his second language. Dawson and his family emigrated to Australia in 1989, when he was thirteen, and settled in Perth, where he attended Hollywood Senior High School. He went on to Edith Cowan University (ECU), graduating with a degree in education. Before entering parliament, Dawson worked for periods as a lobbyist (with Hawker Britton) and corporate manager (with Essential Media Communications). He also served for a time as chief of staff to David Templeman (a minister in the Carpenter government).

== Politics ==
At the 2005 state election, Dawson ran in the unwinnable sixth position on the Labor ticket in Mining and Pastoral Region. In 2009, following the resignation of Alan Carpenter, he unsuccessfully contested the preselection process for the Willagee state by-election, losing out to Peter Tinley. At the 2013 state election, Dawson was elected to the Legislative Council as the lead Labor candidate in Mining and Pastoral Region. He became the first Irish-born MP in Western Australia since 1950, when Sir Norbert Keenan left office. Dawson's term began in May 2013, and he was immediately elected deputy chairman of committees in the Legislative Council. In September 2013, he was added to Mark McGowan's shadow cabinet. After the landslide 2017 state election victory, Dawson was added to cabinet with responsibility for the environment and disability services. On 13 December 2018, Dawson replaced Bill Johnston as Minister for Electoral Affairs as part of a minor cabinet reshuffle. On 14 December 2022, he was named Minister for Emergency Services, Minister for Innovation and the Digital Economy, Minister for Medical Research, and Minister for Volunteering.

== Personal life ==
Dawson is openly gay. In December 2013, he and his partner, Dennis Liddelow, became the first same-sex couple to be legally married in Australia. They had a midnight ceremony in Canberra, taking advantage of legislation passed by the Australian Capital Territory (ACT). However, their marriage was annulled six days later (along with all other same-sex marriages), due to the High Court's finding that the ACT legislation was in conflict with the federal Marriage Act 1961 and thus unconstitutional.
