= Tom Helm (politician) =

Australian politician

Thomas Richard Helm (born 5 April 1941) is a former Australian politician.

He was born in Bootle in England and arrived in Australia in 1980. He was a rigger before entering politics. In 1986 he was elected to the Western Australian Legislative Council as a Labor member for North Province, moving to Mining and Pastoral from 1989. From 1993 to 1997 he was Opposition Whip, and from 1997 to 2000 he was Shadow Minister for Works and Services. However, he resigned from the Labor Party on 27 July 2000 to sit as an independent, and was defeated at the 2001 election.
