= Greg Smith (Western Australian politician) =

Australian politician

Gregory David Smith (born 14 September 1960) is a former Australian politician. He was a Liberal member of the Western Australian Legislative Council for Mining and Pastoral from 1997 to 2001.

Smith was born in Melbourne, Victoria. A shearer and pastoralist, he moved to Western Australia in 1988. He was elected to parliament in 1996 for a term commencing in 1997 and held his seat until he was defeated at the 2001 state election.
