= Wilson Tucker (politician) =

Western Australian politician (born 1984)

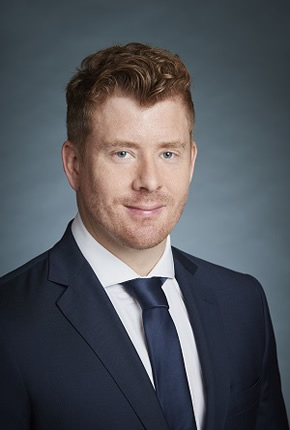
- Official portrait, 2021

Member of the Western Australian Legislative Council for Mining and Pastoral
- In office 22 May 2021 – 22 May 2025
- Preceded by: Jacqui Boydell

Personal details
- Born: Wilson Robert Tucker; 29 September 1984 (age 42) Geraldton, Western Australia, Australia
- Party: Independent (since 2023) (Note: The Daylight Saving Party was deregistered in February 2023, but the party remains active. Tucker sat as an independent in parliament.)
- Other political affiliations: Daylight Saving (since 2016)
- Relations: Brett Tucker (brother)
- Education: Edith Cowan University (BCompSc)
- Profession: Software engineer

Wilson Robert Tucker (born 29 September 1984) is an Australian former politician who served in the Western Australian Legislative Council, representing the Mining and Pastoral region. He was elected at the 2021 Western Australian state election for the Daylight Saving Party, with 98 primary votes, or 0.18% of the vote – believed to be the lowest percentage of the primary vote for any politician elected to a parliament in Australia.

== Biography ==
=== Pre-2021 election ===
Tucker lived in the state's South West region for most of his early life and graduated from St Joseph's High School. He worked as an electrician for two years before studying a Bachelor of Computer Science at Edith Cowan University in Perth. He moved to Seattle in 2018 to continue his career.

He co-founded the Daylight Saving Party with his twin brother Brett Tucker in 2016, and was an unsuccessful candidate for the South Metropolitan region in the 2017 state election, winning 0.79% of the vote.

=== Election and controversy ===
His 2021 victory has been characterised as "one of the most unlikely victories in Australian political history", especially given the Mining and Pastoral region had one of the highest rates of opposition to daylight saving in previous state referendums on the issue.

Tucker's 0.18% of the primary vote fell far short of the quota requirement; he reached the required quota of 6,603 with preferences from other microparties organised by Glenn Druery. Liberals for Climate, Sustainable Australia, Western Australia Party, Great Australian Party, Health Australia Party, Liberal Democrats and some independents preferenced the Daylight Saving Party second on their group voting tickets. His election, along with those of Sophia Moermond and Brian Walker – two Legalise Cannabis WA candidates in the electoral region of South West and East Metropolitan who respectively achieved 2.21% and 2.63% of the primary vote – attracted criticism of the group ticket voting system. ABC election analyst Antony Green tweeted "Elected as a Daylight Saving Party MLC from Mining and Pastoral Region, despite polling only 98 votes, and he doesn't actually currently live in the state. You couldn't get a better case of what's wrong with group voting tickets." Tucker argued that his election was won in a system that "was nothing new" and had been used by the incumbent Labor government to their own advantage. He later promised he would vote against daylight saving if he found it was inconsistent with the beliefs of his electorate.

Tucker's election raised further controversy when it was revealed he had been working as a software engineering manager in Seattle, Washington, United States for several years at the time of his election. The only requirements to be elected in the Western Australian Legislative Council are that the candidate is at least 18, an Australian citizen, not subject to legal incapacity, an elector entitled to vote in a district and has lived in Western Australia for at least 1 year. Tucker said he would return to Western Australia to claim the seat.

=== Term ===
Tucker was a member of the Standing Committee on Public Administration.

Premier Mark McGowan used Tucker's election as justification for changes to the election system for the Western Australia Legislative Council in 2021. The changes to the system to be implemented by the McGowan government include removing group ticket voting and removing regions from the Legislative Council, with each elector in Western Australia voting for the 37 members of that house.

By August 2022, Tucker had drafted a private member's bill to introduce daylight saving in Western Australia. He wanted to have parliament directly introduce daylight saving rather than hold a referendum on the issue. Four previous referendums have been held in Western Australia, all rejecting the introduction of daylight saving. Premier McGowan said his government would "respect" the result of the four previous referendums.

Tucker's Daylight Saving Party did not apply for continuing registration and was deregistered by the Western Australian Electoral Commission in February 2023. Tucker continued his term as an independent. He considered joining the Democratic Labour Party for the 2025 state election. Tucker ended talks with the party, electing to return to the technology industry, when new state restrictions forced the party to change its name and it selected "Stop Pedophiles! Protect kiddies!".
