= Daylight Saving Party =

- Leader: Wilson Tucker
- Secretary: Brett Tucker
- Founded: September 2016
- Ideology: Single-issue party
- WA Legislative Council: 1 / 36 (2021–23)

Website
- Official website

The Daylight Saving Party (also known as the Daylight Savings Party) was an Australian political party in Western Australia. It was founded in September 2016 by brothers Brett and Wilson Tucker. It was registered as a political party on 29 November 2016. The party was deregistered in February 2023, but remained active for some time.

== Background ==
Western Australia does not observe daylight saving time, and has rejected it in referendums in 1975, 1984, 1992 and 2009. Western Australia trialled daylight saving for three years before the 2009 referendum, and one summer before each of the earlier referendums.

Four states of Australia do have daylight saving, so the time zone difference between them and Western Australia is one hour further during summer as Western Australia is the westernmost state of Australia. Australia's Indian Ocean territories of Christmas Island and Cocos (Keeling) Islands also do not observe daylight saving and have year-round offsets of 60 and 90 minutes from Western Australia.

An earlier Daylight Saving Party registration in 2005 was cancelled in 2008 when the Electoral Commissioner found that it did not have at least 500 members. That party fielded one candidate each in five of the six regions in the September 2008 election before being deregistered in November the same year.

== History ==
The Daylight Saving Party has fielded two candidates in each of the six regions for the Western Australian Legislative Council at the 2017 Western Australian election. Voting for the legislative council uses group voting tickets, and preference deals amongst five minor parties orchestrated by Glenn Druery mean that the Daylight Saving Party has its best chance of winning a seat in the South Metropolitan Region. The other four parties involved in the preference deal are Family First, Liberal Democrats, Flux the System and Fluoride Free.

Wilson Tucker was elected in the 2021 Western Australian state election for the Mining and Pastoral electoral region with 98 primary votes (0.23%).

The party was deregistered as a political party in February 2023, but remains active. Tucker continued to sit in the Legislative Council as an independent.

After the abolition of group voting tickets, the party did not contest the 2025 election and lost representation in the Western Australian Parliament.

== See also ==
- Daylight Saving for South East Queensland
