= Kado Muir =

Australian Aboriginal artist, and rights activist

- Born: Leonora, Western Australia
- Occupations: Visual artist; anthropologist; Indigenous rights activist
- Years active: 1990s–present
- Political party: Nationals (2016–present); Greens (2004–2013)

Kado Muir is an Australian Aboriginal artist, anthropologist, archaeologist, and Indigenous rights activist in Western Australia.

== Early life and family ==
Muir's father was dogger Peter Muir, who gave the important sacred and archaeological site Serpent's Glen, in the Little Sandy Desert, its name. Muir spent 16 months in the area around the Carnarvon Ranges (also known as Katjarra) in 1962, and gave the first written account of the rock art at Serpent's Glen, now known as Karnatukul. He also named Billycan Spring. He married Daisy, an Aboriginal woman, and had sons Talbot and Kado.

== Traditional owner ==
Muir is a Ngalia traditional owner, holder of cultural knowledge and of the Mantjiltjara language, and of the country to the northwest of Leonora. He is an applicant on the Mantjintjarra Ngalia peoples native title claim in the Goldfields region.

== Advocacy ==
He is a fierce advocate for the rights of Indigenous Australians in land rights, protecting heritage, and recognising the value of traditional knowledge and cultural expression, and has researched and published on Australian Aboriginal heritage and native title.

In July 2021 told the UN Expert Mechanism on the Rights of Indigenous Peoples (EMRIP), in a meeting presided over by current chair Megan Davis, that the Australian Government had not been doing enough to protect Aboriginal heritage, and that the draft Aboriginal Cultural Heritage Bill (which would supersede WA's Aboriginal Heritage Act 1972 still allowed the Minister of Aboriginal Affairs to override the wishes of traditional owners. He has written several articles about the destruction of Juukan Gorge for The Conversation.

== Art ==
Muir is an accomplished visual artist, specialising in printmaking, and also works on canvas.

In 2018, together with his wife Deeva, Muir painted a mural called Reti on the wall of Kalgoorlie Police Station. Reti (English name Empress Springs) is a significant cultural site in Great Victoria Desert, and is situated on land subject to a native title claim.

In 2022 he has led workshops to make rugs made of recycled fabric for a cross-cultural art project called Reclaim the Void, created by Ngalia elders and others under the direction of Muir and Vivienne Robertson. The rugs will be joined, creating a huge textile artwork depicting the story of the Tjukurrpa of the country where gold mines have been dug, and intended to comment on both the desecration of the land and the over-consumption of society. The work will be displayed in the Western Australian Museum.

== Other roles ==
He was chairperson of the Tjupan Ngalia Tribal Land Council (an Aboriginal corporation) around or before 2008, and as of July 2022 is chair of the National Native Title Council, co-chair of the First National Heritage Protection Alliance and a member of the steering committee of the First Nations Clean Energy Network.

As of 2021 he is a director of the Wakamurru Aboriginal Corporation, which represents Manta Rirrtinya Native Title Holders.

He is also an advocate of bilingual and "two-way" education in Australia.

=== Politics ===
Muir stood as a candidate for the Greens at the 2004 and 2010 federal elections and the 2005 and 2013 state elections. In 2016, he was selected as the WA Nationals' lead senate candidate at the 2016 federal election. His bid was unsuccessful, the Nationals having been overtaken by Pauline Hanson's One Nation.

== Personal life and family ==
Muir is married to artist Deeva Muir, who was born in Malaysia and has a Sri Lankan Tamil background. Their eldest son Karthi is an actor who trained at the Western Australian Academy of Performing Arts; his younger brother Kuberan is an artist, as of 2019 in his second year of a degree in photography at Curtin University; and younger sister Ammbigai is also a visual artist.
