= Robin Scott (Western Australian politician) =

Australian politician (born 1953)

Deputy Leader of Pauline Hanson's One Nation in Western Australia
- Incumbent
- Assumed office 9 January 2017
- Leader: Colin Tincknell
- Preceded by: Peter Georgiou

Member of the Western Australian Legislative Council for Mining and Pastoral Region
- In office 22 May 2017 – 21 May 2021

Personal details
- Born: Robin David Scott; 21 March 1953 (age 73) Wishaw, Scotland, UK
- Party: One Nation
- Occupation: Electrical contractor (self-employed)
- Profession: Tradesman; Politician

Robin David Scott (born 21 March 1953) is an Australian politician. He was elected to the Western Australian Legislative Council at the 2017 state election, as a One Nation member in Mining and Pastoral Region. He served until his defeat in 2021.

Scott previously contested the Division of Kalgoorlie at the 2001 and 2004 federal elections. He also contested the Division of Brand at the 2007 election.
