= Jon Ford (Australian politician) =

Australian politician

The Honourable Jon Ford

Member of the Western Australian Legislative Council for Mining and Pastoral
- In office 22 May 2001 – 21 May 2013

Minister for Local Government
- In office 3 February 2006 – 13 December 2006
- Premier: Alan Carpenter
- Preceded by: John Bowler
- Succeeded by: John Bowler

Personal details
- Born: Jonathan Robert Ford; 11 August 1958 (age 67) Deniliquin, New South Wales
- Party: Labor
- Spouse: Sally Talbot
- Children: 3
- Education: University of Western Australia
- Profession: Politician

Jonathan Robert Ford (born 11 August 1958) is an Australian former politician. He was a Labor member of the Western Australian Legislative Council from 2001 to 2013, representing the Mining and Pastoral Region.

Ford was born in the New South Wales country town of Deniliquin. He moved to Western Australia in the 1980s to work in the mining and gas industry in the north of Western Australia. In 1990, he joined the Australian Labor Party, and was elected to Western Australian Legislative Council at the 2001 state election.

Ford was a minister in the governments of Geoff Gallop and Alan Carpenter. In March 2005, Ford became the Minister for Fisheries and the Minister for Kimberley, Pilbara and Gascoyne. He took on a third portfolio when he became Minister for Local Government and Regional Development in February 2006, later the Minister for Regional Development from December 2006. Finally a fourth portfolio was added to his responsibilities when he became Minister for Employment Protection in February 2008. Ford left the ministry after the Carpenter government was defeated at the 2008 state election.

Ford was the Labor candidate for the Western Australian seat of O'Connor at the 2016 federal election.
