= Peter Foster (politician) =

Australian politician (born 1979)

The Honourable Peter Foster MLC

Member of the Western Australian Legislative Council for Mining and Pastoral Region
- In office 22 May 2021 – 2025

Personal details
- Born: 19 December 1979 (age 46) Kurri Kurri, New South Wales
- Party: Labor

Peter Allan Foster (born 19 December 1979) is an Australian politician.

Foster was formerly a Shire of Ashburton councillor representing the Tom Price ward. At the 2021 Western Australian state election, Foster was elected to the Western Australian Legislative Council as a Labor member for Mining and Pastoral.

He was unseated in the 2025 Western Australian state election.
