= Helen Bullock (politician) =

Chinese-born Australian politician

The Honorable Helen Bullock

Member of the Western Australian Legislative Council for Mining and Pastoral Region
- In office 22 May 2009 – 21 May 2013

Personal details
- Born: 16 May 1965 Nanjing, China
- Died: 23 October 2024 (aged 59) Tasmania
- Party: Labor
- Spouse: Joe Bullock
- Education: Nanjing Railway High School; Curtin University
- Profession: Accountant

Helen Hong Hui Bullock (16 May 1965 – 23 October 2024) was an Australian politician.

== Biography ==
Born in Nanjing, China, to Dai Bin-Hai and Gao Wen-Hua, Bullock arrived in Western Australia on 28 January 1991. She was an accountant before entering politics, holding a Bachelor of Commerce and a Postgraduate Diploma in Business. In 2008, she was elected to the Western Australian Legislative Council as a Labor Party member, representing Mining and Pastoral Region. Her term commenced on 22 May 2009.

In 1994, she married trade unionist and later Labor senator Joe Bullock.

She has been a member of Australian Services Union and Chung Wah Association Inc.
