= Klara Andric =

Western Australian politician

The Honourable Klara Andric MLC

Member of the Western Australian Legislative Council for South Metropolitan Region
- Incumbent
- Assumed office 22 May 2021
- Premier: Mark McGowan
- Premier: Roger Cook (politician) (from 8 June 2023)

Personal details
- Born: 9 March 1981 (age 45) Novi Sad, Serbia
- Party: Labor
- Education: Edith Cowan University

Klara Andric (born 9 March 1981) is an Australian politician. Born in Serbia (then Yugoslavia) to Hungarian parents, Klara and István Marton, she emigrated to Australia with her family in 1986. She is the first Serbian-born person to be elected to the Parliament of Western Australia and the first Serbian born woman to be elected to any Parliament in Australia.

A member of the Labor Party, Andric has been a candidate for the party at the 2013 state election (Jandakot) and the 2014 Australian Senate special election in Western Australia. From 2017 to 2021, she was the director of the Labor Business Roundtable, a fundraising and engagement initiative operated by WA Labor.

Andric was elected as a member of the Western Australian Legislative Council for South Metropolitan as part of the historic landslide 2021 state election which saw WA Labor seize a majority in the Legislative Council for the first time in state history. Andric was sworn in on 22 May 2021. In 2025 the party experienced a historic third consecutive landslide win, Andric was 12th on the WA Labor upper house ticket meaning she was comfortably reelected with the party obtaining sufficient quotas for 15 seats.

== Professional and political career ==
Before entering politics, Klara Andric worked in retail at Myer. Her political journey began through the Labor Movement Work Experience Program, an initiative led by Senator Chris Evans, which opened the door to roles with various state and federal members of Parliament, including then Premier Alan Carpenter. She went on to work for the United Workers Union and UnionsWA. From 2017 onwards, Andric held a senior position at WA Labor, where she also worked with the Labor Business Roundtable.

== Personal views ==
Andric is affiliated with the United Workers Union and is part of the Labor Left faction. Andric is an advocate for multiculturalism, gender equality, and social justice, believing that inclusive policies, equal representation, and support for migrant and working-class communities are essential to building a fairer and more representative society.

== Personal life ==
Andric lives in Coogee, a suburb in Perth’s south, where she has raised her family and remains closely connected to the South Metropolitan Region she represents. She is the mother of two daughters, Andjela and Aleksandra. She has one sister, Rebeka Marton, who is also active in politics.
