= Rosetta Sahanna =

Western Australian politician

The Honourable Rosetta Sahanna MLC

Member of the Western Australian Legislative Council for Mining and Pastoral
- In office 22 May 2021 – 21 May 2025

Personal details
- Born: 12 February 1960 (age 66) Broome, Western Australia
- Party: Labor

Rosetta Sahanna (born 12 February 1960) is an Australian politician. She has been an Australian Labor Party member of the Western Australian Legislative Council since 2021, representing Mining and Pastoral region.

She was elected to the Legislative Council at the 2021 state election. A Wilinggin woman, she is the first Aboriginal person elected to the state's upper house. She is a member of the board of the Kimberley Land Council.

She was unseated in the 2025 Western Australian state election.
