= Neil Thomson (politician) =

Australian politician

The Honourable Neil Thomson MLC

Member of the Western Australian Legislative Council for Mining and Pastoral Region
- Incumbent
- Assumed office 22 May 2021

Personal details
- Born: 27 January 1963 (age 63) Ōpōtiki, New Zealand
- Party: Liberal

Neil Thomson (born 27 January 1963) is an Australian politician.

Born and raised in New Zealand, Thomson emigrated to Australia in 1985.

Thomson was employed in the Western Australian Public Service from 1988 until 2017 including in the departments of Agriculture, Treasury and Finance, Fisheries, Planning and Aboriginal Affairs, the latter two reaching the senior levels of Assistant Director General and Executive Director (Lands).

At the 2021 Western Australian state election, Thomson was elected to the Western Australian Legislative Council as the only Liberal member for Mining and Pastoral. Thomson was re-elected in 2025 as the sixth member on the Liberal Party voting ticket under the revised Statewide Legislative Council electoral system.

Thomson has served in a number of portfolio roles for the Opposition including as Shadow Minister for Planning, Lands, Aboriginal Affairs, Environment, Treasury, Public Sector, Seniors and Heritage. As at September 2026 Thomson is the Shadow Minister for Planning and Lands, Aboriginal Affairs, Public Sector and Seniors.

Thomson also serves as the Opposition Whip in the Legislative Council (from April 2025).
