= Kyle McGinn =

Australian politician (born 1988)

The Honourable Kyle McGinn MLC

Member of the Western Australian Legislative Council for Mining and Pastoral Region
- In office 22 May 2017 – 8 March 2025

Personal details
- Born: Kyle Owen McGinn; 23 May 1988 (age 37) Darwin, Northern Territory, Australia
- Party: Labor Party

Kyle Owen McGinn (born 23 May 1988) is an Australian politician. He was elected to the Western Australian Legislative Council at the 2017 state election, as a Labor member in Mining and Pastoral Region. He held the seat until his retirement at the 2025 election.

McGinn worked as a union representative before entering state politics.

McGinn sought Labor preselection for the new federal Division of Bullwinkel, but was defeated by Shire of Mundaring deputy president Trish Cook in September 2024 after the federal branch intervened. The following day, McGinn announced his retirement from politics at the 2025 state election.

McGinn gave his farewell speech on 22 May 2025, performing a "shoey" in celebration, receiving applause and laughter from fellow Members of Parliament. President Alanna Clohesy immediately got up and asked the politician to take his seat saying, "The honourable member is very well aware that he ran a very fine line in offending the dignity of the council. So, I assume his speech has now concluded".
