= Diane Evers (politician) =

Australian politician (born 1963)

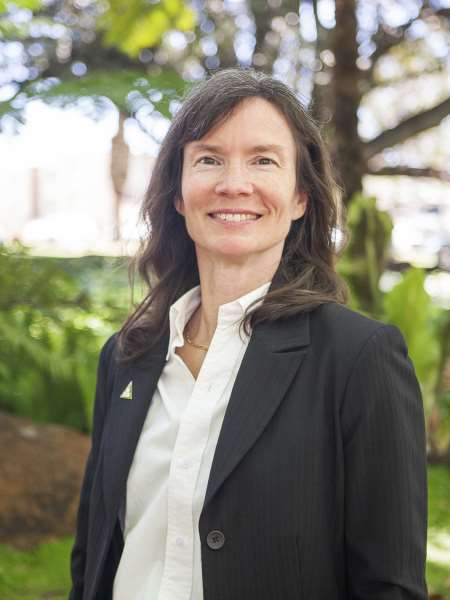

Member of the Western Australian Legislative Council for South West Region
- In office 22 May 2017 – 21 May 2021

Councillor of the City of Albany
- In office 1999–2003

Personal details
- Born: Diane Marie Evers; 2 July 1963 (age 63) Chicago, Illinois, United States
- Party: Greens (since 2005)
- Other political affiliations: Liberals for Forests (2001)
- Spouse: Tony Evers
- Education: University of Illinois
- Occupation: Accountant, politician
- Website: dianevers.com.au

Diane Marie Evers (born 2 July 1963) is an Australian politician and accountant. She was elected to the Western Australian Legislative Council at the 2017 state election, as a Greens member in South West Region. Her term began on 22 May 2017 and ended on 21 May 2021 following her defeat at the 2021 state election.

Evers was born in Chicago, Illinois, and developed a strong aptitude for numbers, studying at University of Illinois, leading her to pursue a career in finance and accounting. She emigrated to Australia in 1984 and later settled in Albany, Western Australia, where she has lived for nearly thirty years. She and her husband, Tony Evers, raised four children in Albany and became deeply involved in the local community.

== Political career ==
=== Local government ===
Evers was elected as a Councillor for the City of Albany in 1999, serving until 2003. During her time in local government, she was an advocate for sustainable development, environmental protection, and responsible land use planning.

=== State politics ===
Evers ran as a candidate for the now-defunct Liberals for Forests in 2001, a party focused on environmentalism and ending native forest logging. She later joined the Greens and contested elections in Stirling in 2005 and Albany in 2008 and 2013.

In 2017, she was elected to the Western Australian Legislative Council for the South West Region as a Greens member. During her tenure, she was an advocate for:

- Environmental protection– promoting forest conservation, marine reserves, and renewable energy policies.
- Sustainable development - opposing genetically modified (GM) crops and supporting regional planning reforms.
- Economic and social justice – addressing the rising cost of living and inequality in regional WA.

She introduced bills aimed at directing mining royalties toward environmental protection, securing greater recognition of WA’s forests, and strengthening environmental safeguards for future generations.

Evers was defeated in the 2021 state election, ending her term on 21 May 2021. She was a candidate in the 2025 Western Australian state election but was not elected as she was in fifth place on the list and the Greens won four seats.

== Political views and advocacy ==
Evers has been a vocal critic of government policies that prioritize corporate interests over environmental and community concerns. She has also called for increased investment in regional infrastructure, renewable energy, and social services.

She has argued that the cost of living crisis and climate change require urgent action, stating that "business as usual is not working."

== Personal life ==
Evers is married to Tony Evers, and they have four children. She continues to reside in Albany, Western Australia, where she remains involved in environmental activism and community engagement.
