= Ken Baston =

Australian politician

Member of the Western Australian Legislative Council for Mining and Pastoral Region
- In office 22 May 2005 – 21 May 2021

Minister for Agriculture and Food
- In office 21 March 2013 – 31 March 2016
- Preceded by: Terry Redman
- Succeeded by: Dean Nalder

Minister for Fisheries
- In office 11 December 2013 – 31 March 2016
- Preceded by: Troy Buswell
- Succeeded by: Joe Francis

Personal details
- Born: 29 June 1949 (age 77) Subiaco, Western Australia
- Party: Liberal
- Spouse: Robin

Kenneth Charles Baston (born 29 June 1949) is an Australian politician who is a former Liberal Party member of the Western Australian Legislative Council representing the Mining and Pastoral Region. First elected to parliament at the 2005 state election, Baston was elevated to Cabinet following the 2013 state election, and held the positions of Minister for Agriculture and Food and Minister for Fisheries until March 2016.

Baston described his childhood—growing up on a sheep station that was run by his parents on the coast north west of Carnarvon, Western Australia—as idyllic. He completed his early education by correspondence before heading to boarding school in Perth to complete his education. Following his schooling in Perth, he ran the Ella Valla sheep station on a pastoral lease 90 kilometres (56 mi) south of Carnarvon, exporting wool and meat.

Baston won preselection for the region for the 2008 election and was chosen to be listed second on the ballot paper for the Liberal Party, after Norman Moore.
