= Robin Chapple =

Australian politician (born 1947)

The Honourable Robin Chapple
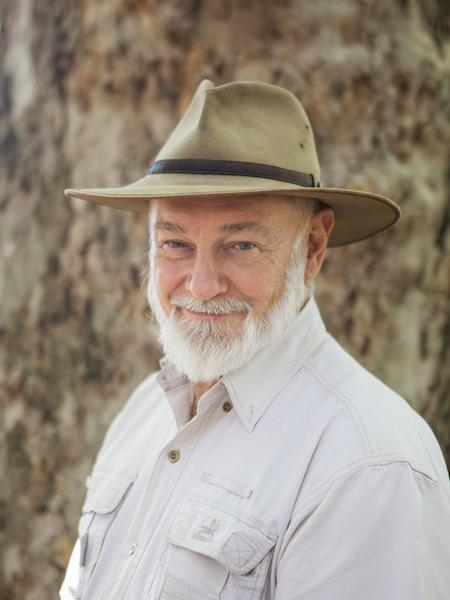

Member of the Western Australian Legislative Council
- In office 22 May 2001 – 21 May 2005
- Constituency: Mining and Pastoral Region
- In office 22 May 2009 – 21 May 2021

Councillor, Town of Port Hedland
- In office 1986–1993

Personal details
- Born: Robin Howard Chapple; February 11, 1947 (age 79) Wheathampstead, England
- Party: WA Greens
- Website: www.robinchapple.com

Robin Howard Chapple (born 11 February 1947) is a former Australian politician and member of the Western Australian Legislative Council representing the Mining and Pastoral Region for The Greens. He served from 2001 to 2005 and again from 2009 to 2021, becoming one of the longest-serving Greens parliamentarians in Western Australia.

== Early life and career ==
Chapple was born in Wheathampstead, England. Before migrating to Australia in 1974, he worked as a junior stockbroker at the London Stock Exchange, a qualified automotive mechanical engineer, and with Oxfam in what is now Bangladesh.

After settling in Australia, Chapple worked in engineering and surveying across the Central Desert and northern regions, often alongside remote Aboriginal communities. He later worked for BHP in Port Hedland and the State Water Authority.

== Local government and activism ==
From 1986 to 1993, Chapple served as a councillor for the Town of Port Hedland, representing the community on the Municipal Association of Western Australia and the Country Shire Councils Association.

He co-founded the Local Environment Affinity Force (LEAF) of Hedland, a community environmental organisation active in recycling, tree-planting, and sustainability. Chapple later ran an environmental consultancy, Chapple Research, providing social and environmental impact assessments to regional industries and councils.

He became a leading campaigner for the protection of the Burrup Peninsula and against proposals for uranium mining in Western Australia and the Pangea Resources international nuclear-waste dump. He was coordinator of the Anti-Nuclear Alliance of Western Australia and a member of the Department of Minerals and Energy’s Minerals Environmental Liaison Committee.

== Parliamentary career ==
Chapple was first elected to the Western Australian Legislative Council at the 2001 state election, becoming the first Greens (WA) member to represent the Mining and Pastoral Region. He lost his seat in 2005 but was re-elected in 2008, serving until his retirement in 2021.

Throughout his tenure, Chapple was the Greens spokesperson for Aboriginal Affairs, Energy and Climate Change, Mines and Petroleum, Nuclear Issues, Regional Sustainability, and Waste Management. He advocated sustainable development, transparency in mining approvals, and the protection of Aboriginal heritage sites such as Murujuga.

=== Committees ===
- Member, Joint Standing Committee on Delegated Legislation (2001–2005)
- Deputy Chair of Committees (2017–2021)

=== Legislative work ===
Chapple introduced bills to legalise voluntary assisted dying in 2002 and 2010, both defeated, but he later contributed to the 2018 Joint Select Committee on End-of-Life Choices that informed the passage of the Voluntary Assisted Dying Act 2019 (Western Australia).

He was also active in opposing fracking and nuclear development while promoting renewable-energy initiatives such as the Greens’ "Energy 2029" plan.

== Health and retirement ==
In 2020, Chapple announced that he had been diagnosed with asbestosis, a condition he attributed to his early work at the Wittenoom asbestos mine. He retired from politics at the 2021 state election.
