= Jacqui Boydell =

Australian politician

Deputy Leader of the Nationals WA
- In office 21 March 2017 – 9 March 2020
- Preceded by: Mia Davies
- Succeeded by: Shane Love

Member of the Western Australian Legislative Council for Mining and Pastoral Region
- In office 22 May 2013 – 21 May 2021

Personal details
- Born: 22 February 1968 (age 58) Carnarvon, Western Australia
- Party: Nationals

Jacqueline Ellen Boydell (born 22 February 1968) is an Australian former politician. She was elected to the Western Australian Legislative Council as a Nationals member for Mining and Pastoral region at the 2013 state election. Prior to her election, Boydell was state director of the WA Nationals and previously served as the parliamentary executive officer for the party.

Boydell was born and raised in Carnarvon, and returned there after studying media journalism at WAAPA. She then worked as a radio announcer and in human resources for a major mining operation. Her career has included roles at Centrelink Carnarvon, the Carnarvon Civic Centre and the Northern Guardian Newspaper.

Following the 2017 state election, which resulted in Nationals leader Brendon Grylls losing his seat, Deputy Leader Mia Davies was confirmed as the new party leader with Boydell confirmed as her Deputy Leader, a historic landmark in WA political history.

In February 2020, Boydell announced she would not recontest her seat at the 2021 state election. She resigned as deputy party leader on 9 March 2020 and was replaced by Shane Love.
