= Norman Moore (politician) =

Australian politician

The Honourable Norman Moore AM

Member of the Western Australian Legislative Council for Mining and Pastoral Region
- In office 22 May 1977 – 21 May 2013
- Preceded by: Stan Dellar

Personal details
- Born: 24 August 1945 (age 81)
- Party: Liberal

Norman Frederick Moore AM (born 24 August 1945) is a former Western Australian politician. From 2008 to 2013 he was Minister for Mines and Petroleum; Fisheries; Electoral Affairs and Leader of the Government in the Legislative Council. From 12 to 29 June 2012, he was the Minister for Justice. He held a seat for the Electoral region of Mining and Pastoral and is a member of the Liberal Party.

Born in Kalgoorlie, Moore worked as a high school principal before entering the Western Australian Legislative Council in 1977 as a member of the Lower North Province, defeating incumbent Labor member Stan Dellar in that year's state election. He was the Parliamentary Secretary to the Cabinet from 5 March 1980 to 22 January 1982 under Sir Charles Court, took up several opposition appointments from 1984 to 1993, and held numerous ministerial portfolios in the Court–Cowan Ministry such as education, sport and recreation, mines and tourism. From 1997 to 2013 he was the "Father of the House" in the Council chamber. From 2001 to 2008, he was the leader of the opposition in the Western Australian Legislative Council and held various shadow positions relating to mines and policy development. In September 2005, he discussed his concerns over the decline of federalism in his own party, and the possibility of Western Australia seceding from the rest of the country. After the 2008 state election, he was appointed to the Barnett Ministry.

In July 2011, he made the controversial statement that WA should secede and rely primarily on China for military defence to remain an independent nation free from Canberra's influence. Members of the Liberal Party responded to his comments negatively, stating that they were his personal view and not the stance of the Liberal Party.

On 1 February 2012, he announced that he would retire at the 2013 state election.

He is married to Lee with 3 adult children.

In 2001, he received a Centenary Medal for "service to Australian society through parliament". He was made a Member of the Order of Australia in 2016.
