= Mining and Pastoral Region =

Electoral region of the Western Australian Legislative Council

Mining and Pastoral Region Western Australia—Legislative Council
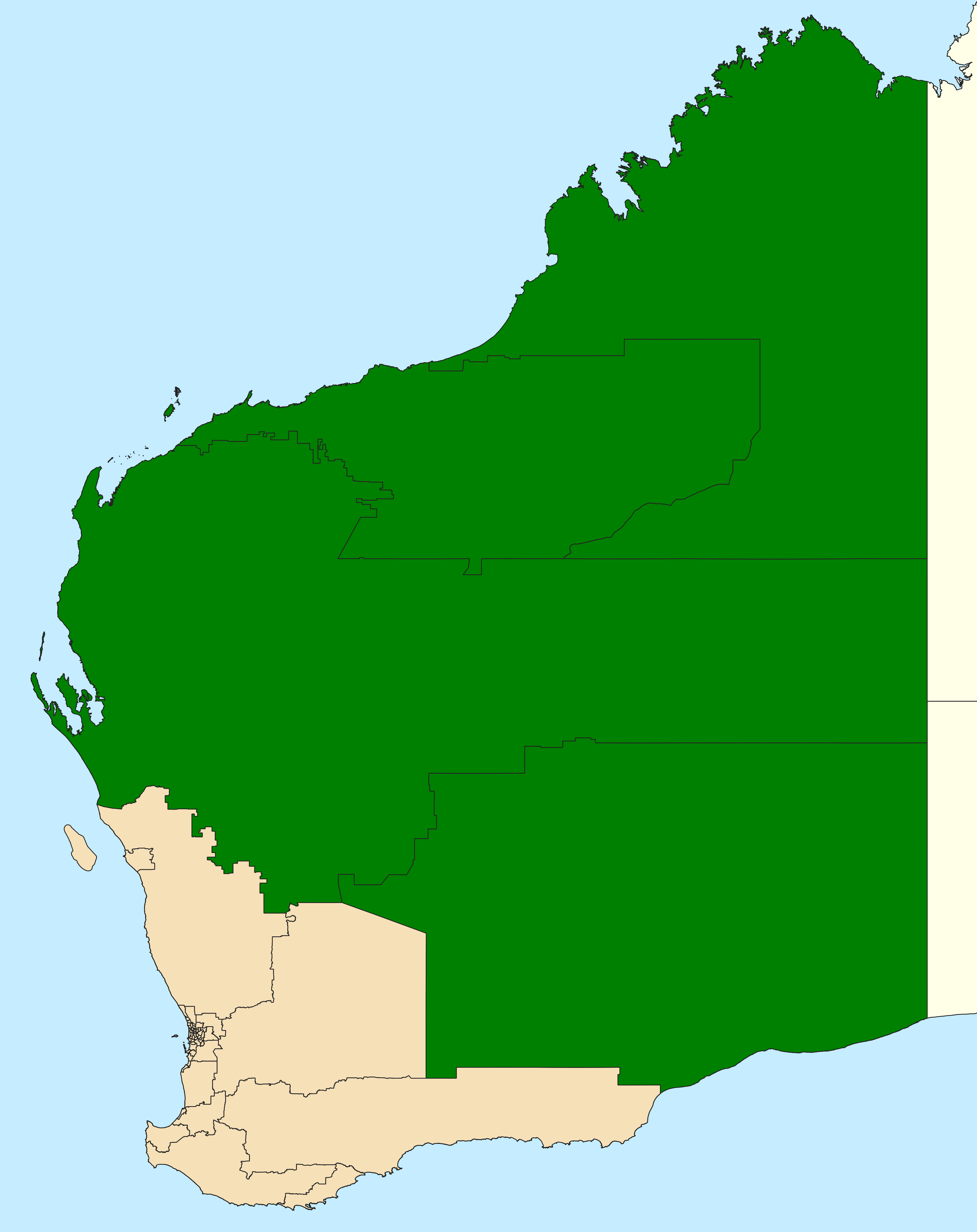
- Location of Mining and Pastoral Region in Western Australia
- State: Western Australia
- Dates current: 1989-2025
- Electors: 69,651 (2021)
- Area: 2,205,281 km^{2} (851,463.8 sq mi)
- Demographic: Rural
- Coordinates: 24.38°S 122.75°E

The Mining and Pastoral Region was a multi-member electoral region of the Western Australian Legislative Council, located in the northern and eastern regions of the state. It was created by the Acts Amendment (Electoral Reform) Act 1987, and became effective on 22 May 1989 with five members who had been elected at the 1989 state election three months earlier. At the 2008 election, it was increased to six members.

The region, along with all other Western Australian Electoral Regions, was abolished in time for the 2025 state election, following legislation passed in November 2021 to create a single, state-wide constituency of 37 members.

== Geography ==
The Region was made up of several complete Legislative Assembly districts, which changed at each distribution.

Redistribution	Period	Electoral districts	Electors	% of state electors	Area
29 April 1988	22 May 1989 – 22 May 1997	Ashburton, Eyre, Kalgoorlie, Kimberley, Northern Rivers, Pilbara (6)	80,626	6.59%	2,210,722 km^{2} (853,565 sq mi)
28 November 1994	22 May 1997 – 22 May 2005	Burrup, Eyre, Kalgoorlie, Kimberley, Ningaloo, Pilbara (6)	64,840	6.27%	2,243,711 km^{2} (866,302 sq mi)
4 August 2003	22 May 2005 – 22 May 2009	Central Kimberley-Pilbara, Kalgoorlie, Kimberley, Murchison-Eyre, North West Coastal (5)	68,556	5.64%	2,223,052 km^{2} (858,325 sq mi)
29 October 2007	22 May 2009 – 22 May 2017	Eyre, Kalgoorlie, Kimberley, North West, Pilbara (5)	73,776	6.18%	2,280,730 km^{2} (880,590 sq mi)
27 November 2015	22 May 2017 – 22 May 2021	Kalgoorlie, Kimberley, North West Central, Pilbara (4)	68,480	4.30%	2,200,087 km^{2} (849,458 sq mi)
27 November 2019	22 May 2021 – 22 May 2025	As per 2015	69,651	4.06%	2,205,281 km^{2} (851,464 sq mi)

== Representation ==
=== Distribution of seats ===
As 5-member seat:

Election	Seats won
1989–1993	
1993–1997	
1997–2001	
2001–2005	
2005–2009	

As 6-member seat:

Election	Seats won
2009–2013	
2013–2017	
2017–2021	
2021–2025	

Legend:

Labor
Liberal
National
Greens WA
One Nation
Daylight Saving

=== Members ===
Since its creation, the electorate had 24 members. All five of the members elected in 1989 had previously been members of the Legislative Council—two from the Lower North Province, two from the North Province and one from the South-East Province.

Members for Mining and Pastoral Region
Year	Member	Party	Member	Party	Member	Party	Member	Party	Member	Party	Member	Party
1989	Tom Stephens	Labor	Tom Helm	Labor	Mark Nevill	Labor	Phil Lockyer	Liberal	Norman Moore	Liberal		
1993	Tom Stephens	Labor	Tom Helm	Labor	Mark Nevill	Labor	Phil Lockyer	Liberal	Norman Moore	Liberal		
1996	Tom Stephens	Labor	Tom Helm	Labor	Mark Nevill	Labor	Greg Smith	Liberal	Norman Moore	Liberal		
1999	Tom Stephens	Labor	Tom Helm	Labor	Mark Nevill	Independent	Greg Smith	Liberal	Norman Moore	Liberal		
2000	Tom Stephens	Labor	Tom Helm	Independent	Mark Nevill	Independent	Greg Smith	Liberal	Norman Moore	Liberal		
2001	Tom Stephens	Labor	Jon Ford	Labor	Robin Chapple	Greens	John Fischer	One Nation	Norman Moore	Liberal		
2004	Kevin Leahy	Labor	Jon Ford	Labor	Robin Chapple	Greens	John Fischer	Independent	Norman Moore	Liberal		
2005	Vince Catania	Labor	Jon Ford	Labor	Shelley Archer	Labor	Ken Baston	Liberal	Norman Moore	Liberal		
2007	Vince Catania	Labor	Jon Ford	Labor	Shelley Archer	Independent	Ken Baston	Liberal	Norman Moore	Liberal		
2008	Shelley Eaton	Labor	Jon Ford	Labor	Shelley Archer	Independent	Ken Baston	Liberal	Norman Moore	Liberal		
2008	Robin Chapple	Greens	Jon Ford	Labor	Helen Bullock	Labor	Ken Baston	Liberal	Norman Moore	Liberal	Wendy Duncan	Nationals
2013	Robin Chapple	Greens	Jon Ford	Labor	Helen Bullock	Labor	Ken Baston	Liberal	Norman Moore	Liberal	Dave Grills	Nationals
2013	Robin Chapple	Greens	Stephen Dawson	Labor	Mark Lewis	Liberal	Ken Baston	Liberal	Jacqui Boydell	Nationals	Dave Grills	Nationals
2017	Robin Chapple	Greens	Stephen Dawson	Labor	Kyle McGinn	Labor	Ken Baston	Liberal	Jacqui Boydell	Nationals	Robin Scott	One Nation
2021	Peter Foster	Labor	Stephen Dawson	Labor	Kyle McGinn	Labor	Rosetta Sahanna	Labor	Wilson Tucker	Daylight Saving	Neil Thomson	Liberal
2023	Peter Foster	Labor	Stephen Dawson	Labor	Kyle McGinn	Labor	Rosetta Sahanna	Labor	Wilson Tucker	Independent Daylight Saving	Neil Thomson	Liberal

== Election results ==
2021 Western Australian state election: Mining and Pastoral
Party	Candidate	Votes	%	±%
Quota		7,010		
Labor	1. Stephen Dawson (elected 1); 2. Kyle McGinn (elected 2); 3. Peter Foster (elected 3); 4. Rosetta Sahanna (elected 4); 5. Kelvin Portland; 6. Bobby-Lee Field	28,002	57.07	+22.91
Liberal	1. Neil Thomson (elected 6); 2. Michael Huston; 3. Jodie Richardson; 4. Matt Blampey	5,250	10.70	−4.99
National	1. Nicholas Fardell; 2. Lionel Quartermaine; 3. Tony Crook; 4. Kieran Dart; 5. Mark Young; 6. Tessa Daly	5,032	10.26	−8.72
Greens	1. Kimberly Smith; 2. Giz Watson	2,431	4.95	−0.72
Shooters, Fishers, Farmers	1. Matt Priest; 2. Royce Normington; 3. Kingsley Smith	1,705	3.48	−1.67
One Nation	1. Robin Scott; 2. David Modolo	1,490	3.04	−10.66
Legalise Cannabis	1. James Brown; 2. Donald Watt	1,277	2.60	+2.60
Western Australia	1. Dave Grills; 2. Julie Matheson	729	1.49	+1.22
Christians	1. Jacky Young; 2. Ross Patterson	582	1.19	−0.32
Liberals for Climate	1. Curtis Greening; 2. Gavin McFerran	552	1.13	+0.10
No Mandatory Vaccination	1. Andrew Middleton; 2. Deborah Middleton	526	1.07	+1.07
Animal Justice	1. Emmarae Cole-Darby; 2. Scott Dunning	398	0.81	+0.81
Liberal Democrats	1. Robbie Parr; 2. Jake McCoull	198	0.40	−0.29
Independent	1. Tayla Squires; 2. Cameron Gardiner	188	0.38	+0.38
Sustainable Australia	1. Brian Mollan; 2. Anthony Park	158	0.32	+0.32
WAxit	1. Brenden Hatton; 2. Huw Grossmith	116	0.24	+0.10
Great Australian	1. Nathan Webb-Smith; 2. Laona Mullings	113	0.23	+0.23
Daylight Saving	1. Wilson Tucker (elected 5); 2. Janet Wilson	98	0.20	−0.30
Independent	1. Anthony Fels; 2. Van Son Le	85	0.17	+0.17
Health Australia	1. Teddy Craies; 2. Simon Martin	82	0.17	+0.17
Independent	1. Christine Kelly; 2. Noel McGinniss	52	0.11	+0.11
Total formal votes		49,064	97.83	+0.74
Informal votes		1,088	2.17	−0.74
Turnout		50,152	72.00	−15.20
