= Dave Grills =

Australian politician

Member of the Western Australian Legislative Council for Mining and Pastoral Region
- In office 5 April 2013 – 21 May 2017

Personal details
- Born: 12 April 1959 (age 67) Birmingham, England, United Kingdom
- Party: Independent (2021–)
- Other political affiliations: Nationals (2013-2020); Western Australia (2020–2021)
- Profession: Police officer

Dave Grills (born 12 April 1959) is an Australian politician. He was elected to the Western Australian Legislative Council as a Nationals member for Mining and Pastoral Region at the 2013 state election. He was defeated at the 2017 state election. He is running to regain his old seat at the 2021 state election with the Western Australia Party.

Although scheduled to take his seat on 22 May 2013, he was elected in a recount on 5 April to the vacancy caused by the resignation of Wendy Duncan to contest the Legislative Assembly seat of Kalgoorlie.

Grills was born in Birmingham, England and arrived in Western Australia in 1965. Prior to his election, he was a Kalgoorlie-based police officer and served for a period as the Goldfields-Esperance District Crime Prevention and Diversity Officer. He also previously served as a local government councillor on two separate occasions, first at the Shire of Leonora and then the City of Kalgoorlie-Boulder. He is currently based in Kalgoorlie but maintains an electorate office in Esperance.

Grills listed law and order, youth justice and the provision of greater opportunities for youth in regional and rural Western Australia among his priorities.

As a representative of the vast Mining and Pastoral electorate, Grills criticised the use of fly-in fly-out operational workers by mining companies in Western Australia on the grounds that it undermines regional development efforts and called for a state policy on transient worker accommodation.

In August 2020, it was announced that he had joined the Western Australia Party and would be contesting the Mining and Pastoral Region for them at the 2021 state election.

Grills is a councillor on the City of Kalgoorlie-Boulder.
