= Electoral results for the Agricultural Region =

This is a list of electoral results for the Agricultural Region in Western Australian state elections from the region's creation in 1989 until the present.

Legislation to abolish the region, along with all other Western Australian electoral regions, was passed in November 2021, with the 2025 state election to use a single state-wide electorate of 37 members.

== Election results ==
=== 2021 ===
2021 Western Australian state election: Agricultural
Party	Candidate	Votes	%	±%
Quota		12,357		
Labor	1. Darren West (elected 1); 2. Shelley Payne (elected 3); 3. Sandra Carr (elected 4); 4. Luke Clarkson	39,263	45.39	+21.39
National	1. Colin de Grussa (elected 2); 2. Martin Aldridge (elected 6); 3. Natasha Colliver; 4. Steve Blyth; 5. Rob Horstman; 6. Ian Hanna	22,999	26.59	−4.72
Liberal	1. Steve Martin (elected 5); 2. Kathryn Jackson; 3. Jim Chown; 4. Maria Girak; 5. Brett Jackson	10,672	12.34	−6.31
Shooters, Fishers, Farmers	1. Stuart Ostle; 2. Ronald Lean	3,572	4.13	−1.52
Greens	1. Peter Leam; 2. Vivienne Glance	2,579	2.98	−0.62
One Nation	1. Rod Caddies; 2. Emma McKinley	1,765	2.04	−9.62
Christians	1. Trevor Young; 2. Les Holten	1,295	1.50	−0.34
Legalise Cannabis	1. Leo Treasure; 2. Keith Clinton	1,150	1.33	+1.33
No Mandatory Vaccination	1. Aaron Horsman; 2. Jessica Young	685	0.79	+0.79
Western Australia	1. Michael O'Loghlen; 2. Allan Butson	462	0.53	+0.24
Animal Justice	1. Courtney Henry; 2. Roberta Vlaar	339	0.39	+0.39
Liberal Democrats	1. Connor Whittle; 2. Cameron Puttick	339	0.39	−0.70
Liberals for Climate	1. Peter Turner; 2. Nathan Thomson	205	0.24	−0.12
Health Australia	1. Bass Tadros; 2. Svetlana Ivanchenko	201	0.23	+0.23
WAxit	1. Russell Sewell; 2. Simon Glossop	186	0.22	+0.11
Great Australian	1. Lawrie Carr; 2. Shane Edwards	185	0.21	+0.21
Sustainable Australia	1. Greg Norris; 2. James Fowler	153	0.18	+0.18
Independent	Parminder Singh	134	0.15	+0.15
Daylight Saving	1. Brett Tucker; 2. Andrew Wilson	69	0.08	−0.14
Independent	1. J. M. David	66	0.08	+0.08
Independent	1. Felly Chandra; 2. Chelsea Henderson	62	0.07	+0.07
Independent	Andrew Ballantyne	36	0.04	+0.04
Independent	Les Mirco	27	0.03	+0.03
Independent	Peter Wallis	25	0.03	+0.03
Independent	Steven Hopkins	24	0.03	+0.03
Total formal votes		86,493	97.77	+0.68
Informal votes		1,969	2.23	−0.68
Turnout		88,462	85.57	−1.63

=== 2017 ===
2017 Western Australian state election: Agricultural
Party	Candidate	Votes	%	±%
Quota		12,597		
National	1. Martin Aldridge (elected 1); 2. Colin de Grussa (elected 4); 3. Leigh Ballard; 4. Fred Block; 5. Steve Blyth; 6. David Kennedy	27,060	30.69	−1.04
Labor	1. Darren West (elected 2); 2. Laurie Graham (elected 5); 3. Carol Martin; 4. Luke Clarkson	21,164	24.00	+6.43
Liberal	1. Jim Chown (elected 3); 2. Steve Martin; 3. Brian Ellis; 4. Chris Wilkins; 5. Alan McFarland	16,446	18.65	−15.20
One Nation	1. Rod Caddies; 2. Craig McKinley; 3. Emma McKinley	10,283	11.66	+11.66
Shooters, Fishers, Farmers	1. Rick Mazza (elected 6); 2. Bevan Steele; 3. Mal Kentish	4,985	5.65	+2.37
Greens	1. Ian James; 2. Dylan Copeland	3,178	3.60	−0.35
Christians	1. Trevor Young; 2. Les Holten	1,624	1.84	−0.03
Liberal Democrats	1. Connor Whittle; 2. Stuart Hatch	960	1.09	+1.09
Family First	1. Murray Yarran; 2. Leighton Knoll	830	0.94	−0.16
Flux the System!	1. Lewis Freer; 2. Peter Turner	313	0.35	+0.35
Matheson for WA	1. Peter Swift; 2. Bruce Anderson	260	0.29	+0.29
Daylight Saving	1. Vince Radford; 2. Robert Tucker	196	0.22	+0.22
Fluoride Free WA	1. Phillip Strahan; 2. Gillian Pearce	192	0.22	+0.22
Independent Flux	1. Alexander Reid; 2. Tim McMahon	184	0.21	+0.21
Independent	1. Murray Fleeton; 2. Patrick Akkari	105	0.12	+0.12
Micro Business	1. Dennis Jennings; 2. Petar Culum	91	0.10	+0.10
Independent	1. Brent Williamson; 2. Michael Prinz	76	0.09	+0.09
Independent	Frank Hough	74	0.08	+0.08
Independent	1. David Reed; 2. Lewis Butto	58	0.07	+0.07
Independent Flux	1. N. Spada; 2. S. Demir	53	0.06	+0.06
Independent	Graham Barrett-Lennard	43	0.05	+0.05
Total formal votes		88,175	97.28	+0.08
Informal votes		2,462	2.72	−0.08
Turnout		90,637	88.21	−2.19

=== 2013 ===
2013 Western Australian state election: Agricultural
Party	Candidate	Votes	%	±%
Quota		11,383		
Liberal	1. Jim Chown (elected 1); 2. Brian Ellis (elected 4); 3. Steve Martin; 4. Alan McFarland; 5. Sarah Panizza; 6. James McLagan	26,973	33.85	+1.22
National	1. Martin Aldridge (elected 2); 2. Paul Brown (elected 5); 3. Jill Sounness; 4. Cathie Bowen; 5. Rosalba Butterworth	25,289	31.74	−1.70
Labor	1. Darren West (elected 3); 2. Matt Benson-Lidholm; 3. Judy Riggs; 4. Sheila Mills; 5. Bob Somerville; 6. Graeme McBeath	13,998	17.57	−4.03
Independent	1. Max Trenorden; 2. Philip Gardiner; 3. Bill Cowan; 4. Robert Kestel; 5. Lindsay Tuckwell	4,192	5.26	+5.26
Greens	1. Andy Huntley; 2. Sarah Nielsen-Harvey	3,149	3.95	−1.15
Shooters and Fishers	1. Rick Mazza (elected 6); 2. Ray Hull	2,618	3.29	+3.29
Christians	1. Trevor Young; 2. Lachlan Dunjey	1,494	1.88	−0.44
Family First	1. Peter Custers; 2. Steven Fuhrmann	879	1.10	−1.75
Independent	1. Anne-Marie Copeland; 2. Ian James; 3. Darrell Boase	528	0.66	+0.66
Independent	1. Anthony Fels; 2. Felly Chandra	239	0.30	+0.30
Independent	1. Peter Swift; 2. Rod Davis	138	0.17	+0.17
Independent	1. Osama Rifai; 2. Yaebiyo Araya	94	0.12	+0.12
Independent	Gregory Kenney	61	0.08	+0.08
	Tony Bozich	26	0.03	+0.03
Total formal votes		79,678	97.20	−0.46
Informal votes		2,294	2.80	+0.46
Turnout		81,972	90.40	+1.97

=== 2008 ===
2008 Western Australian state election: Agricultural
Party	Candidate	Votes	%	±%
Quota		10,432		
National	1. Max Trenorden (elected 1); 2. Philip Gardiner (elected 4); 3. Mia Davies (elected 6); 4. Martin Aldridge; 5. Cathy Wood	24,420	33.44	+14.1
Liberal	1. Brian Ellis (elected 2); 2. Jim Chown (elected 5); 3. Chris Wilkins; 4. Jane Mouritz; 5. Jamie Falls	23,830	32.63	−5.9
Labor	1. Matt Benson-Lidholm (elected 3); 2. Darren West; 3. Vickie Petersen; 4. Alan McCallum	15,772	21.60	−6.0
Greens	1. Dee Margetts; 2. Paul Connolly	3,721	5.10	+0.9
Family First	1. Anthony Fels; 2. Felly Chandra	2,080	2.85	+1.4
Christian Democrats	1. Mac Forsyth; 2. Lachlan Dunjey	1,692	2.32	+0.3
One Nation	Ross Paravicini	624	0.85	−2.2
Independent	1. Shelly Posey; 2. Valerie Tan	493	0.68	+0.7
Citizens Electoral Council	1. Stuart Smith; 2. Chris Pepper	215	0.29	0.0
New Country	Chris Dodoff	175	0.24	−2.1
Total formal votes		73,022	97.66	+0.5
Informal votes		1,746	2.34	−0.5
Turnout		74,768	88.43	−2.9

=== 2005 ===
2005 Western Australian state election: Agricultural
Party	Candidate	Votes	%	±%
Quota		14,056		
Liberal	1. Bruce Donaldson (elected 1); 2. Anthony Fels (elected 4); 3. Margaret Rowe (elected 5); 4. Brian Ellis	33,198	39.4	+9.4
Labor	1. Kim Chance (elected 2); 2. Tim Daly; 3. Darren West	22,504	26.7	+6.5
National	1. Murray Criddle (elected 3); 2. Wendy Duncan; 3. Chris Nelson; 4. Denise Clydesdale-Gebert	16,251	19.3	+0.4
Greens	1. Dee Margetts; 2. Basil Schur	3,708	4.4	−0.1
One Nation	1. Ron McLean; 2. Barry Strahan; 3. Michael Fallis	2,528	3.0	−19.0
New Country	1. Frank Hough; 2. Colin Nicholl; 3. Frank Marley	1,946	2.3	+2.3
Christian Democrats	1. Lachlan Dunjey; 2. Alistair McNabb	1,590	1.9	+1.9
Family First	1. Nigel Irvine; 2. Heidi Farhi	1,271	1.5	+1.5
Independent	Roy Duncanson	477	0.6	+0.6
Democrats	1. Anthony Bennell; 2. David Thackrah	309	0.4	−1.5
Liberals for Forests	1. Peter Theobald; 2. Joy Richardson	278	0.3	+0.3
Citizens Electoral Council	1. Jean Robinson; 2. Stuart Smith	244	0.3	+0.3
Public Hospital Support Group	1. John Darby; 2. Paul Shann	27	0.03	+0.03
Total formal votes		84,331	97.1	−0.4
Informal votes		2,488	2.9	+0.4
Turnout		86,819	91.4	−0.6

=== 2001 ===
2001 Western Australian state election: Agricultural
Party	Candidate	Votes	%	±%
Quota		13,591		
Liberal	1. Bruce Donaldson (elected 1); 2. Murray Nixon; 3. Stuart Adams; 4. Brian Reading; 5. Margaret Rowe	24,484	30.0	
One Nation	1. Frank Hough (elected 2); 2. Ron McLean; 3. Leonard Hamersley	17,934	22.0	+22.0
Labor	1. Kim Chance (elected 3); 2. Dale Piercey; 3. Kelly Shay; 4. Cathryn Backer	16,486	20.2	−2.5
National	1. Murray Criddle (elected 4); 2. Dexter Davies; 3. Geoff Gill; 4. Chris Nelson; 5. Allan Marshall; 6. Gavin Davis	15,373	18.9	
Greens	1. Dee Margetts (elected 5); 2. Kate Davis	3,698	4.5	+4.5
Curtin Labor Alliance	1. A E Harvey; 2. Malcolm Talbot	1,940	2.4	+2.4
Democrats	1. Marilyn Rock; 2. Malcolm McKercher	1,508	1.9	−4.8
Independent	Ramon Kennedy	118	0.1	+0.1
Total formal votes		81,541	97.5	+0.8
Informal votes		2,094	2.5	−0.8
Turnout		83,635	92.0	+0.9

- The Liberal and National parties ran a joint ticket in 1996. The overall swing against the coalition for this region is -19.6.

=== 1996 ===
1996 Western Australian state election: Agricultural
Party	Candidate	Votes	%	±%
Quota		13,181		
Liberal/National Coalition	1. Bruce Donaldson (elected 1); 2. Eric Charlton (elected 3); 3. Murray Nixon (elected 4); 4. Murray Criddle (elected 5); 5. Fran Weller; 6. Dexter Davies; 7. Anthony Fels; 8. Barbara Morrell	54,179	68.5	−1.1
Labor	1. Kim Chance (elected 2); 2. Dale Piercey; 3. Debbie Helm	17,917	22.7	−1.2
Democrats	1. Lea Logie; 2. Geoff Taylor	5,252	6.6	+4.2
Natural Law	1. Gary Nelson; 2. Anne Leishman	1,733	2.2	+2.2
Total formal votes		79,081	96.7	−1.2
Informal votes		2,675	3.3	+1.2
Turnout		81,756	91.1	−3.4

=== 1993 ===
1993 Western Australian state election: Agricultural
Party	Candidate	Votes	%	±%
Quota		13,162		
Liberal	1. Bruce Donaldson (elected 1); 2. Murray Nixon (elected 4); 3. Peter Lee; 4. Steve Boylan; 5. Fran Weller	32,176	40.74	−0.55
National	1. Eric Charlton (elected 2); 2. Murray Criddle (elected 5); 3. Dascia Weckert; 4. Geoff Gill	22,799	28.87	+2.09
Labor	1. Kim Chance (elected 3); 2. John Mason; 3. Dianne Spowart; 4. John Czuzman	18,911	23.95	−1.68
Greens	1. Pete Christiansen; 2. John Phillips	2,553	3.23	−1.49
Democrats	1. Terrence Cheetham; 2. Lindsay Olman; 3. Robert Endersbee	1,927	2.44	+0.72
Grey Power	Salli Vaughan	604	0.76	+0.76
Total formal votes		78.970	97.88	−0.19
Informal votes		1,713	2.12	+0.19
Turnout		80,683	94.51	

=== 1989 ===
1989 Western Australian state election: Agricultural
Party	Candidate	Votes	%	±%
Quota		12,452		
Liberal	1. Margaret McAleer (elected 1); 2. David Wordsworth (elected 4); 3. Murray Nixon; 4. Ian Whitehurst; 5. Elizabeth Rocchi	30,866	41.29	
National	1. Eric Charlton (elected 2); 2. John Caldwell (elected 5); 3. Dexter Davies; 4. Anthony Critch	20,020	26.78	
Labor	1. James Brown (elected 3); 2. Kim Chance; 3. Lorna Long; 4. John Czuzman; 5. Mary Ridley	19,160	25.63	
One Australia Movement	1. Cedric Jacobs; 2. Margaret Jacobs; 3. Malcolm Taylor	2,119	2.83	
Greens	1. James Cavill; 2. Ronald Lewis	1,302	1.74	
Democrats	Robert Whitehead	1,287	1.72	
Total formal votes		74,754	97.71	
Informal votes		1,750	2.29	
Turnout		76,504	92.13	
