= Results of the 2013 Western Australian state election (Legislative Council) =

2013 Western Australian state election (Legislative Council)
- 9 March 2013

All 36 seats in the Legislative Council 18 seats needed for a majority

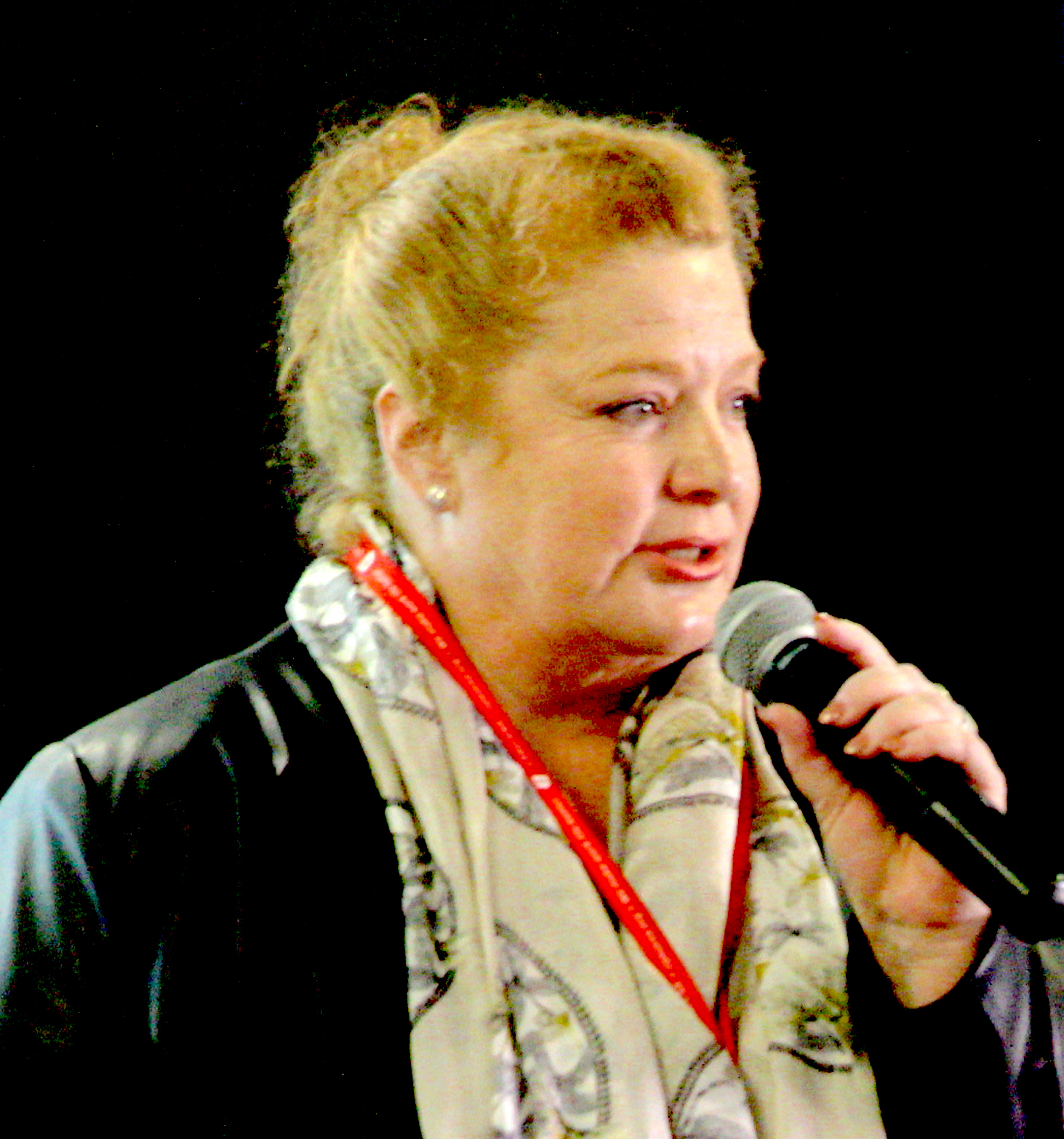

	First party	Second party	Third party
Leader	Peter Collier	Sue Ellery	None
Party	Liberal	Labor	National
Leader's seat	North Metropolitan	South Metropolitan	—
Seats before	16	11	5
Seats won	17	11	5
Seat change	▲1	Steady	Steady
Popular vote	583,500	398,260	59,804
Percentage	47.62%	32.51%	4.88%
Swing	▲8.02pp	▼3.63pp	▼0.44pp
	Fourth party	Fifth party
		SFF
Leader	None	Rick Mazza
Party	Greens	SFF
Leader's seat	—	Agricultural Region (won seat)
Seats before	4	0
Seats won	2	1
Seat change	▼1	▲1
Popular vote	100,624	21,765
Percentage	8.21%	1.78%
Swing	▼2.87pp	▲1.78pp

This is a list of electoral region results for the Western Australian Legislative Council in the 2013 Western Australian state election.

The Shooters, Fishers and Farmers Party won their first ever Western Australian Legislative Council seat at this election.

== Results by electoral region ==
=== Agricultural ===
2013 Western Australian state election: Agricultural
Party	Candidate	Votes	%	±%
Quota		11,383		
Liberal	1. Jim Chown (elected 1); 2. Brian Ellis (elected 4); 3. Steve Martin; 4. Alan McFarland; 5. Sarah Panizza; 6. James McLagan	26,973	33.85	+1.22
National	1. Martin Aldridge (elected 2); 2. Paul Brown (elected 5); 3. Jill Sounness; 4. Cathie Bowen; 5. Rosalba Butterworth	25,289	31.74	−1.70
Labor	1. Darren West (elected 3); 2. Matt Benson-Lidholm; 3. Judy Riggs; 4. Sheila Mills; 5. Bob Somerville; 6. Graeme McBeath	13,998	17.57	−4.03
Independent	1. Max Trenorden; 2. Philip Gardiner; 3. Bill Cowan; 4. Robert Kestel; 5. Lindsay Tuckwell	4,192	5.26	+5.26
Greens	1. Andy Huntley; 2. Sarah Nielsen-Harvey	3,149	3.95	−1.15
Shooters and Fishers	1. Rick Mazza (elected 6); 2. Ray Hull	2,618	3.29	+3.29
Christians	1. Trevor Young; 2. Lachlan Dunjey	1,494	1.88	−0.44
Family First	1. Peter Custers; 2. Steven Fuhrmann	879	1.10	−1.75
Independent	1. Anne-Marie Copeland; 2. Ian James; 3. Darrell Boase	528	0.66	+0.66
Independent	1. Anthony Fels; 2. Felly Chandra	239	0.30	+0.30
Independent	1. Peter Swift; 2. Rod Davis	138	0.17	+0.17
Independent	1. Osama Rifai; 2. Yaebiyo Araya	94	0.12	+0.12
Independent	Gregory Kenney	61	0.08	+0.08
	Tony Bozich	26	0.03	+0.03
Total formal votes		79,678	97.20	−0.46
Informal votes		2,294	2.80	+0.46
Turnout		81,972	90.40	+1.97

=== East Metropolitan ===
2013 Western Australian state election: East Metropolitan
Party	Candidate	Votes	%	±%
Quota		43,347		
Liberal	1. Helen Morton (elected 1); 2. Donna Faragher (elected 3); 3. Alyssa Hayden (elected 5); 4. Caroline Preuss; 5. Darryl Trease; 6. Jessica Thorpe-Gordon	142,004	46.80	+9.06
Labor	1. Alanna Clohesy (elected 2); 2. Samantha Rowe (elected 4); 3. Amber-Jade Sanderson (elected 6); 4. Bill Leadbetter; 5. Michelle O'Driscoll; 6. Andy Smith	115,979	38.22	−2.88
Greens	1. Alison Xamon; 2. Glenice Smith; 3. David Bromfield	24,756	8.16	−3.49
Christians	1. Dwight Randall; 2. David Kingston	8,189	2.70	−0.23
Shooters and Fishers	1. Michael Georgiou; 2. Grant Cooper	4,963	1.64	+1.64
Family First	1. Paul Barrett; 2. Nathan Clifford	3,655	1.20	−2.00
Independent	Chung Tu	1,553	0.51	+0.51
Independent	Tom Hoyer	1,380	0.45	−0.17
	Joe Nardizzi	949	0.31	+0.31
Total formal votes		303,428	96.61	−0.13
Informal votes		10,655	3.39	+0.13
Turnout		314,083	89.65	+2.36

=== Mining and Pastoral ===
2013 Western Australian state election: Mining and Pastoral
Party	Candidate	Votes	%	±%
Quota		8,164		
Liberal	1. Ken Baston (elected 1); 2. Mark Lewis (elected 4); 3. Eden Coad; 4. Ross Wood; 5. Ross Beckett	18,355	32.12	+2.30
National	1. Jacqui Boydell (elected 2); 2. Dave Grills (elected 6); 3. John McCourt; 4. David Eagles; 5. Adrian Hatwell; 6. Cale Hill	15,974	27.95	+6.53
Labor	1. Stephen Dawson (elected 3); 2. Jim Murie; 3. Shane Hill; 4. Jon Ford; 5. Linda Morich; 6. Renee Portland	12,789	22.38	−11.72
Greens	1. Robin Chapple (elected 5); 2. Kado Muir	5,107	8.94	−0.01
Shooters and Fishers	1. John Parkes; 2. Stefan Colagiuri	2,121	3.71	+3.71
Family First	1. Ian Rose; 2. Cedric Harper	1,273	2.23	+0.58
Christians	1. Roger Mansell; 2. Mike Walsh	1,016	1.78	−0.09
Independent	Frank Bertola	511	0.89	+0.89
Total formal votes		57,146	97.30	+0.26
Informal votes		1,588	2.70	−0.26
Turnout		58,734	79.46	+5.69

=== North Metropolitan ===
2013 Western Australian state election: North Metropolitan
Party	Candidate	Votes	%	±%
Liberal	1. Peter Collier (elected 1); 2. Michael Mischin (elected 3); 3. Liz Behjat (elected 5); 4. Peter Katsambanis (elected 6); 5. Elise Irwin; 6. Paul Collins	176,867	57.07	+10.78
Labor	1. Ken Travers (elected 2); 2. Ljiljanna Ravlich (elected 4); 3. Martin Pritchard; 4. Laine McDonald; 5. Sarah Seymour; 6. Rebeka Marton	90,892	29.33	−3.33
Greens	1. Cameron Poustie; 2. Rebecca Brown; 3. Heather Aquilina	27,327	8.82	−4.17
Christians	1. Ray Moran; 2. Rudy Labordus	4,779	1.54	−0.71
Shooters and Fishers	1. Paul Bedford; 2. D'arne Stubbs	3,415	1.10	+1.10
Family First	1. Henry Heng; 2. Douglas Croker	2,910	0.94	−0.60
Independent	Noel Avery	1,294	0.42	+0.42
Independent	Angela Smith	1,089	0.35	+0.35
Independent	Michael Tucak	1,008	0.33	+0.33
Independent	Douglas Thorp	306	0.10	+0.10
Total formal votes		309,887	97.58	+0.16
Informal votes		7,691	2.42	−0.16
Turnout		317,578	89.69	+1.87

=== South Metropolitan ===
2013 Western Australian state election: South Metropolitan
Party	Candidate	Votes	%	±%
Quota		43,737		
Liberal	1. Simon O'Brien (elected 1); 2. Nick Goiran (elected 3); 3. Phil Edman (elected 5); 4. Gabriel Moens; 5. Michelle Jack	145,053	47.38	+8.81
Labor	1. Sue Ellery (elected 2); 2. Kate Doust (elected 4); 3. Anne Wood; 4. Dominic Rose; 5. Sharon Thiel; 6. Sandy Bird	113,026	36.92	−3.69
Greens	1. Lynn MacLaren (elected 6); 2. Tammy Solonec; 3. Jean Jenkins	26,911	8.79	−3.12
Christians	1. Bob Burdett; 2. Ka-ren Chew	5,946	1.94	−0.06
Family First	1. Jim McCourt; 2. Steve Bolt	5,466	1.79	−0.34
Shooters and Fishers	1. Ian Blevin; 2. Michael Glover	4,651	1.52	+1.52
Independent	Keith Wilson	2,319	0.76	+0.76
Independent	John Tucak	1,909	0.62	+0.62
Independent	Jim Grayden	872	0.28	+0.28
Total formal votes		306,153	97.24	+0.13
Informal votes		8,702	2.76	−0.13
Turnout		314,855	89.47	+2.27

=== South West ===
2013 Western Australian state election: South West
Party	Candidate	Votes	%	±%
Quota		24,134		
Liberal	1. Robyn McSweeney (elected 1); 2. Barry House (elected 3); 3. Nigel Hallett (elected 5); 4. Ian Morison; 5. Paul Fitzpatrick; 6. Michelle Steck	74,248	43.95	+4.54
Labor	1. Sally Talbot (elected 2); 2. Adele Farina (elected 4); 3. John Mondy; 4. Ian Bishop; 5. Aaron Dean; 6. Pearl Lim	51,576	30.53	−2.53
National	1. Colin Holt (elected 6); 2. Sam Harma; 3. Dudley Greathead	18,541	10.98	+0.21
Greens	1. Giz Watson; 2. Hsien Harper	13,374	7.92	−0.71
Shooters and Fishers	1. Daniel Strijk; 2. Mark Mazza	3,997	2.37	+2.37
Family First	1. Bev Custers; 2. David Bolt	2,577	1.53	−2.38
Christians	1. Justin Moseley; 2. Tim Schoof	2,453	1.45	−0.66
Independent	1. Nataporn Sri-Innop Ross; 2. Janet Grogan	1,205	0.71	+0.71
Independent	Don Hyland	960	0.57	+0.57
Total formal votes		168,931	97.25	−0.13
Informal votes		4,776	2.75	+0.13
Turnout		173,707	90.67	+2.22

== See also ==
- Results of the Western Australian state election, 2013 (Legislative Assembly A-L)
- Results of the Western Australian state election, 2013 (Legislative Assembly M-Z)
- 2013 Western Australian state election
- Candidates of the Western Australian state election, 2013
- Members of the Western Australian Legislative Council, 2013–2017
