= Results of the 2017 Western Australian state election (Legislative Council) =

2017 Western Australian state election (Legislative Council)
- 11 March 2017

All 36 seats on the Legislative Council 18 seats needed for a majority
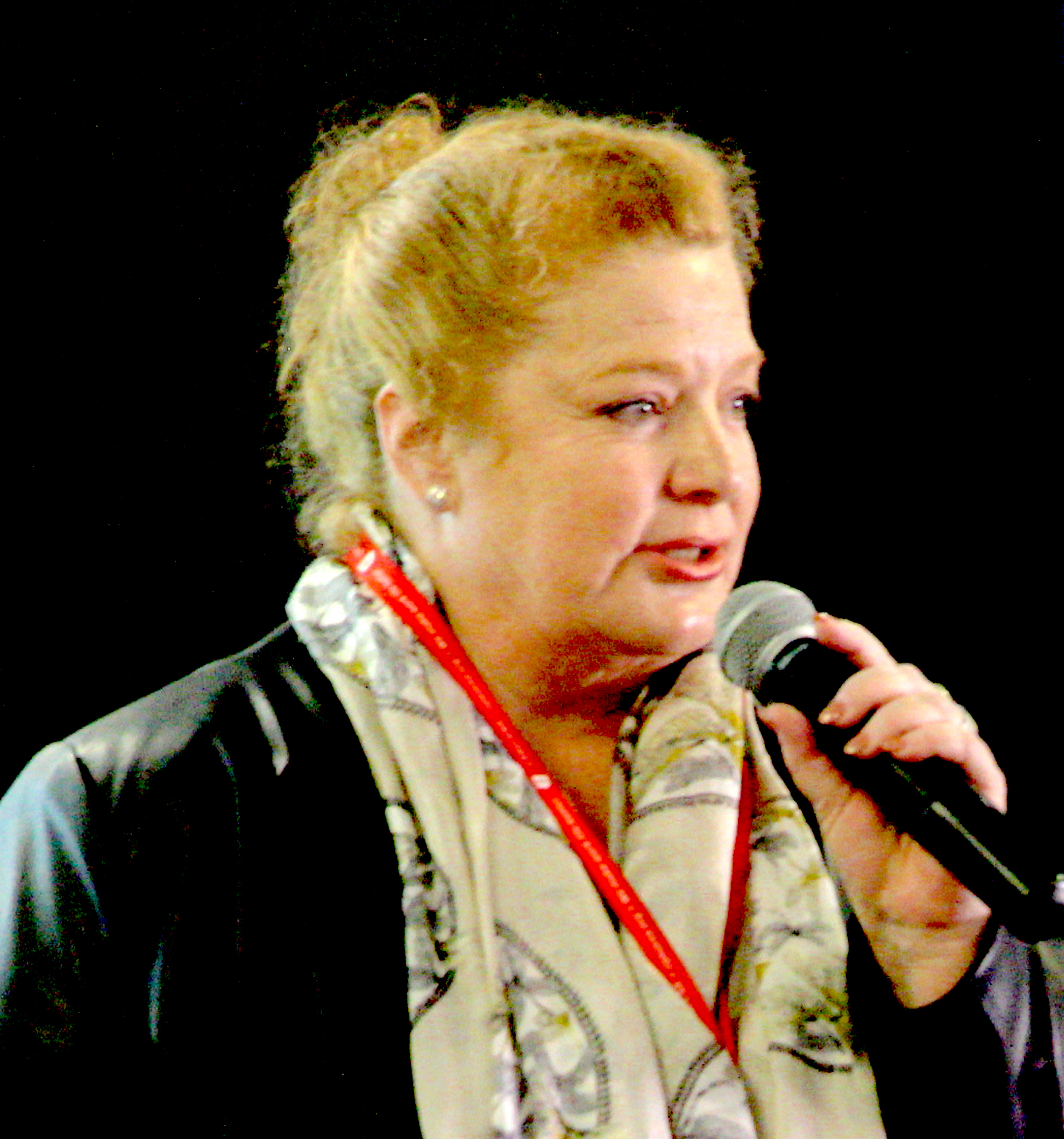

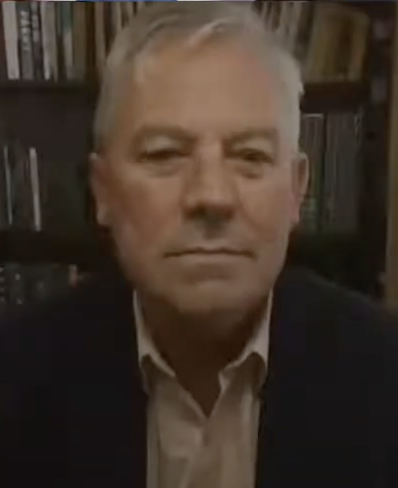

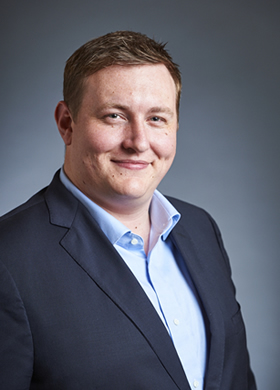
	First party	Second party	Third party
Leader	Sue Ellery	Peter Collier	None
Party	Labor	Liberal	Greens
Leader's seat	South Metropolitan	North Metropolitan	—
Seats before	11	17	2
Seats won	14	9	4
Seat change	▲3	▼8	▲2
Popular vote	544,938	360,235	116,041
Percentage	40.41%	26.71%	8.60%
Swing	▲7.90pp	▼20.91pp	▲0.39pp
	Fourth party	Fifth party	Sixth party
			SFF
Leader	Colin de Grussa	Colin Tincknell	Rick Mazza
Party	National	One Nation	SFF
Leader's seat	Agricultural (won seat)	South West (won seat)	Agricultural
Seats before	5	0	1
Seats won	4	3	1
Seat change	▼1	▲3	Steady
Popular vote	59,776	110,480	31,924
Percentage	4.43%	8.19%	2.37
Swing	▼0.45pp	▲8.19pp	▲0.59pp
	Seventh party
Leader	Aaron Stonehouse
Party	Liberal Democrats
Leader's seat	South Metropolitan
Seats before	0
Seats won	1
Seat change	▲1
Popular vote	23,848
Percentage	1.77%
Swing	▲1.77pp
- Map of seats won for each party per electoral division.

This is a list of electoral region results for the Western Australian Legislative Council in the 2017 Western Australian state election.

The Liberal Democrats won their first ever Western Australian Legislative Council seat at this election.

== Results summary ==
Government (14) Labor (14) Opposition (9) Liberal (9) Crossbench (13) National (4) Greens (4) One Nation (3) Shooters, Fishers, Farmers (1) Liberal Democrats (1)

Legislative Council (STV/GVT) – Turnout 87.00% (CV)
Party	Primary votes	%	Swing	Seats	+/-
Labor	544,938	40.41	+7.90	14	▲3
Liberal	360,235	26.71	−20.91	9	▼8
Greens	116,041	8.60	+0.39	4	▲2
One Nation	110,480	8.19	+8.19	3	▲3
National	59,776	4.43	-0.45	4	▼1
Shooters, Fishers, Farmers	31,924	2.37	+0.59	1	Steady
Christians	26,209	1.94	-0.01	0	Steady
Liberal Democrats	23,848	1.77	+1.77	1	▲1
Animal Justice	14,838	1.10	+1.10	0	Steady
Family First	11,279	0.84	-0.53	0	Steady
Daylight Saving	9,209	0.68	+0.68	0	Steady
Micro Business	7,484	0.55	+0.55	0	Steady
Flux the System!	5,934	0.44	+0.44	0	Steady
Matheson for Western Australia	5,270	0.39	+0.39	0	Steady
Fluoride Free WA	4,327	0.32	+0.32	0	Steady
Socialist Alliance	1,367	0.10	+0.10	0	Steady
Independents	15,516	1.15	-0.53	0	Steady
Other	482	0.03	+0.03	0	Steady
Formal votes	1,348,675	97.29	+0.13		
Informal votes	37,480	2.70	−0.13		
Total	1,386,155			36	
Registered voters / turnout	1,593,222	87.00	-2.20		

== Results by electoral region ==
Map of seats won for each party per electoral division.

=== Agricultural ===
2017 Western Australian state election: Agricultural
Party	Candidate	Votes	%	±%
Quota		12,597		
National	1. Martin Aldridge (elected 1); 2. Colin de Grussa (elected 4); 3. Leigh Ballard; 4. Fred Block; 5. Steve Blyth; 6. David Kennedy	27,060	30.69	−1.04
Labor	1. Darren West (elected 2); 2. Laurie Graham (elected 5); 3. Carol Martin; 4. Luke Clarkson	21,164	24.00	+6.43
Liberal	1. Jim Chown (elected 3); 2. Steve Martin; 3. Brian Ellis; 4. Chris Wilkins; 5. Alan McFarland	16,446	18.65	−15.20
One Nation	1. Rod Caddies; 2. Craig McKinley; 3. Emma McKinley	10,283	11.66	+11.66
Shooters, Fishers, Farmers	1. Rick Mazza (elected 6); 2. Bevan Steele; 3. Mal Kentish	4,985	5.65	+2.37
Greens	1. Ian James; 2. Dylan Copeland	3,178	3.60	−0.35
Christians	1. Trevor Young; 2. Les Holten	1,624	1.84	−0.03
Liberal Democrats	1. Connor Whittle; 2. Stuart Hatch	960	1.09	+1.09
Family First	1. Murray Yarran; 2. Leighton Knoll	830	0.94	−0.16
Flux the System!	1. Lewis Freer; 2. Peter Turner	313	0.35	+0.35
Matheson for WA	1. Peter Swift; 2. Bruce Anderson	260	0.29	+0.29
Daylight Saving	1. Vince Radford; 2. Robert Tucker	196	0.22	+0.22
Fluoride Free WA	1. Phillip Strahan; 2. Gillian Pearce	192	0.22	+0.22
Independent Flux	1. Alexander Reid; 2. Tim McMahon	184	0.21	+0.21
Independent	1. Murray Fleeton; 2. Patrick Akkari	105	0.12	+0.12
Micro Business	1. Dennis Jennings; 2. Petar Culum	91	0.10	+0.10
Independent	1. Brent Williamson; 2. Michael Prinz	76	0.09	+0.09
Independent	Frank Hough	74	0.08	+0.08
Independent	1. David Reed; 2. Lewis Butto	58	0.07	+0.07
Independent Flux	1. N. Spada; 2. S. Demir	53	0.06	+0.06
Independent	Graham Barrett-Lennard	43	0.05	+0.05
Total formal votes		88,175	97.28	+0.08
Informal votes		2,462	2.72	−0.08
Turnout		90,637	88.21	−2.19

=== East Metropolitan ===
2017 Western Australian state election: East Metropolitan
Party	Candidate	Votes	%	±%
Quota		47,831		
Labor	1. Alanna Clohesy (elected 1); 2. Samantha Rowe (elected 3); 3. Matthew Swinbourn (elected 4); 4. Thomas French; 5. Reece Wheadon; 6. Lauren Cayoun	155,707	46.51	+8.28
Liberal	1. Donna Faragher (elected 2); 2. Alyssa Hayden; 3. Helen Morton; 4. Christopher Tan; 5. Raymond Gianoli; 6. Joanna Collins	83,547	24.95	−21.85
Greens	1. Tim Clifford (elected 5); 2. Sarah Nielsen-Harvey; 3. Robyn Walsh	29,810	8.90	+0.74
One Nation	1. Charles Smith (elected 6); 2. Chris Fernandez; 3. Lloyd McIntosh	26,874	8.03	+8.03
Christians	1. Jamie van Burgel; 2. Maryka Groenewald	8,292	2.48	−0.22
Shooters, Fishers, Farmers	1. Paul Pitaro; 2. Mitchell Wellstead; 3. Steve Denham	6,836	2.04	+0.41
Animal Justice	1. Talia Raphaely; 2. Nicole Arielli	4,874	1.46	+1.46
Liberal Democrats	1. Neil Hamilton; 2. Todd Phillips	3,464	1.03	+1.03
Family First	1. Simon Geddes; 2. Steve Fuhrmann	3,361	1.00	+1.00
Daylight Saving	1. Michael Zakrzewski; 2. Riley Burkett	2,642	0.79	+0.79
Micro Business	1. Kelvin White; 2. W. Ginbey	2,531	0.76	+0.76
Flux the System!	1. Rob Redfearn; 2. Jim Taylor	1,522	0.45	+0.45
Matheson for WA	1. Russell Goodrick; 2. Stephen Lau	1,400	0.42	+0.42
Fluoride Free WA	1. John Watt; 2. Trevor McGowan	1,262	0.38	+0.38
Independent Flux	1. M. Lotterin; 2. Stef Pienaar	802	0.24	+0.24
Independent	1. Shawn Dhu; 2. Belinda Lange	677	0.20	+0.20
Independent	1. Jayme Hewitt; 2. Natasha Forde	442	0.13	+0.13
Independent	Roger Cornish	392	0.12	+0.12
Independent Flux	1. Charday Williams; 2. Ben Devlin	381	0.11	+0.11
Total formal votes		334,816	97.09	+0.48
Informal votes		10,036	2.91	−0.48
Turnout		344,852	87.20	−2.44

=== Mining and Pastoral ===
2017 Western Australian state election: Mining and Pastoral
Party	Candidate	Votes	%	±%
Quota		7,045		
Labor	1. Stephen Dawson (elected 1); 2. Kyle McGinn (elected 4); 3. Peter Foster; 4. Christopher Mousley	16,846	34.16	+11.78
National	1. Jacqui Boydell (elected 2); 2. Dave Grills; 3. Gary Brown; 4. Judi Janes; 5. Adrian Hatwell; 6. Terry Fleeton	9,356	18.97	−8.98
Liberal	1. Ken Baston (elected 3); 2. Mark Lewis; 3. Barry Pound; 4. Jason Wells	7,735	15.69	−16.43
One Nation	1. Robin Scott (elected 5); 2. Justin Keating; 3. Janine Varley	6,754	13.70	+13.70
Greens	1. Robin Chapple (elected 6); 2. Timothy Oliver	2,800	5.68	−3.26
Shooters, Fishers, Farmers	1. Stefan Colagiuri; 2. Shane Aylmore; 3. Kingsley Smith	2,539	5.15	+1.44
Christians	1. Grahame Gould; 2. Jacky Young	743	1.51	−0.27
Family First	1. Ian Rose; 2. Bev Custers	508	1.03	−1.20
Flux the System!	1. Kai Shanks; 2. Melissa Taaffe	505	1.02	+1.02
Liberal Democrats	1. Jared Neaves; 2. Marko Vasev	342	0.69	+0.69
Daylight Saving	1. Amanda Klaj; 2. Joel Duffy	246	0.50	+0.50
Fluoride Free WA	1. Anne Porter; 2. David Bauer	210	0.43	+0.43
Matheson for WA	1. Sonya Matheson; 2. Paul Costanzo	132	0.27	+0.27
Independent	1. Paul Fitzgerald; 2. Nicholas Cukela	121	0.25	+0.25
Independent Flux	1. Atilla Ataman; 2. Tayla Stucke	85	0.17	+0.17
Independent	Darby Renton	72	0.15	+0.15
Independent Flux	1. Abed Raouf; 2. Billy Amesz	68	0.14	+0.14
Micro Business	1. Natasha Rogers; 2. Pritam Patil	65	0.13	+0.13
Independent	Julie Owen	55	0.11	+0.11
Independent Flux	1. Angela Hyde; 2. Greg Gandossini	53	0.11	+0.11
Independent	1. Keith Mader; 2. Royce Normington	41	0.08	+0.08
Independent	1. Arihia Henry; 2. Pete Francis	35	0.07	+0.07
Total formal votes		49,311	97.52	+0.23
Informal votes		1,253	2.48	−0.23
Turnout		50,564	73.84	−5.63

=== North Metropolitan ===
2017 Western Australian state election: North Metropolitan
Party	Candidate	Votes	%	±%
Quota		47,901		
Labor	1. Alannah MacTiernan (elected 1); 2. Martin Pritchard (elected 3); 3. Kelly Shay; 4. Hannah Beazley; 5. Laine McDonald; 6. Hugh Nguyen	124,809	37.22	+7.89
Liberal	1. Peter Collier (elected 2); 2. Michael Mischin (elected 4); 3. Tjorn Sibma (elected 6); 4. Victoria Jackson; 5. Sandra Brewer; 6. Tim Walton	122,296	36.47	−20.60
Greens	1. Alison Xamon (elected 5); 2. Samantha Jenkinson; 3. Ziggy Fatnowna	33,448	9.98	+1.16
One Nation	1. John Bombak; 2. Ian Hamilton	21,677	6.46	+6.46
Christians	1. Dwight Randall; 2. Neil Fearis	5,382	1.61	+0.06
Shooters, Fishers, Farmers	1. Stefan Colagiuri; 2. Shane Aylmore; 3. Kingsley Smith	4,359	1.30	+0.20
Animal Justice	1. Natasha Chakich; 2. Elizabeth McCasker	3,989	1.19	+1.19
Liberal Democrats	1. Brian Murray; 2. John Ogilvie	3,662	1.09	+1.09
Daylight Saving	1. Tye Short; 2. Michael Kennedy	2,700	0.81	+0.81
Family First	1. Henry Heng; 2. Lesley Croll	2,369	0.71	−0.23
Micro Business	1. John Golawski; 2. Matt Golawski; 3. Mariah Bennington	2,063	0.62	+0.62
Matheson for WA	1. Julie Matheson; 2. Jane Boxall	2,017	0.60	+0.60
Independent Flux	1. Raoul Smith; 2. Michael Carey	1,701	0.51	+0.51
Flux the System!	1. Joshua van Ross; 2. Owen Merriman	1,465	0.44	+0.44
Fluoride Free WA	1. Anne Porter; 2. David Bauer	1,084	0.32	+0.32
Independent	Michael Tucak	947	0.28	+0.28
Independent Flux	1. A. Albert; 2. Claire Norton	851	0.25	+0.25
Independent	Derek Ammon	313	0.09	+0.09
Independent	Joe Ruzzi	168	0.05	+0.05
Total formal votes		335,300	97.65	+0.07
Informal votes		8,061	2.35	−0.07
Turnout		343,361	87.78	−1.91

=== South Metropolitan ===
2017 Western Australian state election: South Metropolitan
Party	Candidate	Votes	%	±%
Quota		49,570		
Labor	1. Sue Ellery (elected 1); 2. Kate Doust (elected 3); 3. Pierre Yang (elected 4); 4. Kelly McManus; 5. Vicky Burrows; 6. Dustin Rafferty	155,678	44.87	+7.95
Liberal	1. Nick Goiran (elected 2); 2. Simon O'Brien (elected 6); 3. Phil Edman; 4. Michelle Hofmann; 5. Lorraine Finlay; 6. Daryl Pranata	86,197	24.84	−22.54
Greens	1. Lynn MacLaren; 2. Jordon Steele-John; 3. Nasrin Dehghani	32,100	9.25	+0.46
One Nation	1. Philip Scott; 2. Richard Eldridge; 3. Ekaterina Andreeva	24,256	6.99	+6.99
Liberal Democrats	1. Aaron Stonehouse (elected 5); 2. Angadjeet Sanghera	13,571	3.91	+3.91
Christians	1. Bob Burdett; 2. Carmen Burdett	6,876	1.98	+0.04
Shooters, Fishers, Farmers	1. Peter Raffaelli; 2. Wayne Higgs	5,211	1.50	−0.02
Animal Justice	1. Katrina Love; 2. Ramona Janssen	4,434	1.28	+1.28
Daylight Saving	1. Wilson Tucker; 2. Peita Alberti	2,751	0.79	+0.79
Family First	1. Nigel Irvine; 2. Cara Heng	2,419	0.70	−1.09
Micro Business	1. Cam Tinley; 2. Andrew Middleton; 3. Len Dibben	2,361	0.68	+0.68
Independent	1. Carol Adams; 2. Karen Vernon; 3. Luke Bolton; 4. Jonathan Ford	2,308	0.67	+0.67
Independent	1. Robert Cotterell; 2. Michelle Cotterell	1,405	0.40	+0.40
Socialist Alliance	1. Sam Wainwright; 2. Petrina Harley	1,367	0.39	+0.39
Flux the System!	1. Alexander Brownbill; 2. Keith Pomeroy	1,288	0.37	+0.37
Matheson for WA	1. Andrew Luobikis; 2. Angela Watson	1,176	0.34	+0.34
Fluoride Free WA	1. Derek Rucki; 2. Nita Thakrar	996	0.29	+0.29
Independent	1. Vito Matarazzo; 2. Yusuf Oruc	939	0.27	+0.27
Independent	Tony Romano	396	0.11	+0.11
Independent	Laona Jones	379	0.11	+0.11
Independent	1. William Freeman; 2. Daksh Varma	291	0.08	+0.08
Independent Flux	1. Rick Smith; 2. Adrian Snary	242	0.07	+0.07
Independent	Norm Heslington	142	0.04	+0.04
Independent	Rosemary Lorrimar	109	0.03	+0.03
Independent	Frank Brown	93	0.03	+0.03
Total formal votes		346,985	97.13	−0.11
Informal votes		10,257	2.87	+0.11
Turnout		357,242	87.28	−2.19

=== South West ===
2017 Western Australian state election: South West
Party	Candidate	Votes	%	±%
Quota		27,727		
Labor	1. Sally Talbot (elected 1); 2. Adele Farina (elected 3); 3. John Mondy; 4. Barry Winmar; 5. Jessica Short	70,734	36.44	+5.91
Liberal	1. Steve Thomas (elected 2); 2. Wade De Campo; 3. Robyn McSweeney; 4. Tony Norment; 5. Heather Reid; 6. Douglas McLarty	44,014	22.68	−21.27
National	1. Colin Holt (elected 5); 2. Louise Kingston; 3. Bevan Eatts; 4. Kylie Kennaugh	23,360	12.04	+1.06
One Nation	1. Colin Tincknell (elected 4); 2. Cameron Bartkowski; 3. Sean Butler	20,636	10.63	+10.63
Greens	1. Diane Evers (elected 6); 2. Hsien Harper	14,705	7.58	−0.34
Shooters, Fishers, Farmers	1. Nigel Hallett; 2. Craig Carbone; 3. Ray Hull	7,994	4.12	+1.75
Christians	1. Greg Spaanderman; 2. Rachael Dowdell	3,292	1.70	+0.24
Liberal Democrats	1. Nathan Dyson; 2. Damian Coletta	1,849	0.95	+0.95
Family First	1. Linda Rose; 2. Dave Bolt	1,792	0.92	−0.60
Animal Justice	1. Alicia Sutton; 2. Eric Gobbert	1,541	0.79	+0.79
Flux the System!	1. Daithí Gleeson; 2. Mark Bentley	841	0.43	+0.43
Daylight Saving	1. Brett Tucker; 2. Janet Wilson	686	0.35	+0.35
Independent	1. Tim Hartley; 2. Julio Pieraldi	622	0.32	+0.32
Fluoride Free WA	1. Hayley Green; 2. John Vukovich	579	0.30	+0.30
Micro Business	1. Jeff Casson; 2. Devinder Chinna	373	0.19	+0.19
Independent	1. Eric Thern; 2. Katrina De Ruyck	291	0.15	+0.15
Matheson for WA	1. Stephen Phelan; 2. Blake Phelan	285	0.15	+0.15
Independent	Kyle Hammond	267	0.14	+0.14
Independent	John Higgins	155	0.08	+0.08
Independent	Zyggi Uchwal	72	0.04	+0.04
Total formal votes		194,088	97.29	+0.04
Informal votes		5,411	2.71	−0.04
Turnout		199,499	88.25	−2.41
