= Members of the Western Australian Legislative Council, 2017–2021 =

Members of the Western Australian Legislative Council, 2017-2021 Government (14) Labor (14) Opposition (9) Liberal (9) Crossbench (13) National (4) Greens (4) One Nation (3) Shooters, Fishers, Farmers (1) Liberal Democrats (1)

This is a list of members of the Western Australian Legislative Council elected to serve a term between 22 May 2017 and 21 May 2021.

Name	Party	Region	Term in office
Martin Aldridge	National	Agricultural	2013–present
Ken Baston	Liberal	Mining and Pastoral	2005–2021
Jacqui Boydell	National	Mining and Pastoral	2013–2021
Robin Chapple	Greens	Mining and Pastoral	2001–2005; 2009–2021
Jim Chown	Liberal	Agricultural	2009–2021
Tim Clifford	Greens	East Metropolitan	2017–2021
Alanna Clohesy	Labor	East Metropolitan	2013–present
Peter Collier	Liberal	North Metropolitan	2005–present
Stephen Dawson	Labor	Mining and Pastoral	2013–present
Colin de Grussa	National	Agricultural	2017–present
Kate Doust	Labor	South Metropolitan	2001–present
Sue Ellery	Labor	South Metropolitan	2001–present
Diane Evers	Greens	South West	2017–2021
Donna Faragher	Liberal	East Metropolitan	2005–present
Adele Farina	Labor	South West	2001–present
Nick Goiran	Liberal	South Metropolitan	2009–present
Laurie Graham	Labor	Agricultural	2017–2021
Colin Holt	National	South West	2009–2021
Alannah MacTiernan	Labor	North Metropolitan	1993–1996, 2017–present
Rick Mazza	Shooters	Agricultural	2013–2021
Kyle McGinn	Labor	Mining and Pastoral	2017–present
Michael Mischin	Liberal	North Metropolitan	2009–2021
Simon O'Brien	Liberal	South Metropolitan	1997–2021
Martin Pritchard	Labor	North Metropolitan	2015–present
Samantha Rowe	Labor	East Metropolitan	2013–present
Robin Scott	One Nation	Mining and Pastoral	2017–2021
Tjorn Sibma	Liberal	North Metropolitan	2017–present
Charles Smith	One Nation/Independent/Western Australia Party ^{[1]}	East Metropolitan	2017–2021
Aaron Stonehouse	Liberal Democrats	South Metropolitan	2017–2021
Matthew Swinbourn	Labor	East Metropolitan	2017–present
Sally Talbot	Labor	South West	2005–present
Steve Thomas	Liberal	South West	2017–present
Colin Tincknell	One Nation	South West	2017–2021
Alison Xamon	Greens	North Metropolitan	2009–2013, 2017–2021
Darren West	Labor	Agricultural	2013–present
Pierre Yang	Labor	South Metropolitan	2017–present

^{1} East Metropolitan One Nation MLC Charles Smith resigned from the party on 11 June 2019.
