= Members of the Western Australian Legislative Council, 2009–2013 =

This is a list of members of the Western Australian Legislative Council between 22 May 2009 and 21 May 2013:

Name	Party	Region	Period in office
Martin Aldridge^{3}	National	Agricultural	2013–present
Ken Baston	Liberal	Mining and Pastoral	2005–2021
Liz Behjat	Liberal	North Metropolitan	2009–2017
Matt Benson-Lidholm	Labor	Agricultural	2005–2013
Helen Bullock	Labor	Mining and Pastoral	2009–2013
Robin Chapple	Greens	Mining and Pastoral	2001–2005; 2009–present
Jim Chown	Liberal	Agricultural	2009–2021
Peter Collier	Liberal	North Metropolitan	2005–present
Mia Davies^{3}	National	Agricultural	2009–2013
Ed Dermer	Labor	North Metropolitan	1996–2013
Kate Doust	Labor	South Metropolitan	2001–present
Wendy Duncan^{3}	National	Mining and Pastoral	2008–2013
Phil Edman	Liberal	South Metropolitan	2009–2017
Sue Ellery	Labor	South Metropolitan	2001–present
Brian Ellis	Liberal	Agricultural	2007–2017
Donna Faragher	Liberal	East Metropolitan	2005–present
Adele Farina	Labor	South West	2001–present
Jock Ferguson^{1}	Labor	East Metropolitan	2009–2010
Jon Ford	Labor	Mining and Pastoral	2001–2013
Philip Gardiner	National/Independent ^{2}	Agricultural	2009–2013
Dave Grills^{3}	National	Mining and Pastoral	2013–2017
Nick Goiran	Liberal	South Metropolitan	2009–present
Nigel Hallett	Liberal	South West	2005–2017
Alyssa Hayden	Liberal	East Metropolitan	2009–2017
Colin Holt	National	South West	2009–2021
Barry House	Liberal	South West	1987–2017
Lynn MacLaren	Greens	South Metropolitan	2005; 2009–2017
Robyn McSweeney	Liberal	South West	2001–2017
Michael Mischin	Liberal	North Metropolitan	2009–2021
Norman Moore	Liberal	Mining and Pastoral	1977–2013
Helen Morton	Liberal	East Metropolitan	2005–2017
Simon O'Brien	Liberal	South Metropolitan	1997–2021
Ljiljanna Ravlich	Labor	East Metropolitan	1997–2015
Linda Savage^{1}	Labor	East Metropolitan	2010–2013
Sally Talbot	Labor	South West	2005–present
Ken Travers	Labor	North Metropolitan	1997–2016
Max Trenorden	National/Independent ^{2}	Agricultural	2009–2013
Giz Watson	Greens	North Metropolitan	1997–2013
Alison Xamon	Greens	East Metropolitan	2009–2013; 2017–2021

1. Labor East Metropolitan MLC Jock Ferguson died on 13 February 2010. Linda Savage was elected in a recount on 22 March 2010.
2. National Agricultural MLC Max Trenorden was defeated for party preselection in May 2012; fellow National Agricultural MLC Philip Gardiner, initially preselected, withdrew from the Nationals' ticket as a protest. Trenorden announced his candidacy for the next election as an independent in November 2012 and was joined by Gardiner in December.
3. National MLCs Mia Davies and Wendy Duncan resigned on 12 February 2013 to contest the Assembly seats of Central Wheatbelt and Kalgoorlie respectively. Martin Aldridge and Dave Grills were elected in recounts on 5 April 2013.
