= Members of the Western Australian Legislative Council, 2013–2017 =

This is a list of members of the Western Australian Legislative Council between 22 May 2013 and 21 May 2017:

Name	Party	Region	Term in office
Martin Aldridge	National	Agricultural	2013–present
Ken Baston	Liberal	Mining and Pastoral	2005–2021
Liz Behjat	Liberal	North Metropolitan	2009–2017
Paul Brown ^{[4]}	National	Agricultural	2013–2017
Jacqui Boydell	National	Mining and Pastoral	2013–2021
Robin Chapple	Greens	Mining and Pastoral	2001–2005; 2009–2021
Jim Chown	Liberal	Agricultural	2009–2021
Alanna Clohesy	Labor	East Metropolitan	2013–present
Peter Collier	Liberal	North Metropolitan	2005–present
Stephen Dawson	Labor	Mining and Pastoral	2013–present
Kate Doust	Labor	South Metropolitan	2001–present
Phil Edman	Liberal	South Metropolitan	2009–2017
Sue Ellery	Labor	South Metropolitan	2001–present
Brian Ellis	Liberal	Agricultural	2007–2017
Donna Faragher	Liberal	East Metropolitan	2005–present
Adele Farina	Labor	South West	2001–present
Nick Goiran	Liberal	South Metropolitan	2009–present
Dave Grills	National	Mining and Pastoral	2013–2017
Nigel Hallett	Liberal/Shooters and Fishers ^{[2]}	South West	2005–2017
Alyssa Hayden	Liberal	East Metropolitan	2009–2017
Colin Holt	National	South West	2009–2021
Barry House	Liberal	South West	1987–2017
Elise Irwin ^{[4]}	Liberal	North Metropolitan	2017
Peter Katsambanis ^{[4]}	Liberal	North Metropolitan	2013–2017
Bill Leadbetter ^{[4]}	Labor	East Metropolitan	2017
Mark Lewis	Liberal	Mining and Pastoral	2013–2017
Lynn MacLaren	Greens	South Metropolitan	2005; 2009–2017
Robyn McSweeney	Liberal	South West	2001–2017
Rick Mazza	Shooters and Fishers	Agricultural	2013–2021
Laine McDonald ^{[3]}	Labor	North Metropolitan	2016–2017
Michael Mischin	Liberal	North Metropolitan	2009–2021
Helen Morton	Liberal	East Metropolitan	2005–2017
Simon O'Brien	Liberal	South Metropolitan	1997–2021
Martin Pritchard ^{[1]}	Labor	North Metropolitan	2015–present
Ljiljanna Ravlich ^{[1]}	Labor	North Metropolitan	1997–2015
Samantha Rowe	Labor	East Metropolitan	2013–present
Amber-Jade Sanderson ^{[4]}	Labor	East Metropolitan	2013–2017
Sally Talbot	Labor	South West	2005–present
Ken Travers ^{[3]}	Labor	North Metropolitan	1997–2016
Darren West	Labor	Agricultural	2013–present

^{1} North Metropolitan Labor MLC Ljiljanna Ravlich resigned on 10 March 2015. Martin Pritchard was elected in a countback on 21 April.
^{2} South West Liberal MLC Nigel Hallett resigned from the Liberal Party on 16 June 2016 and joined the Shooters, Fishers and Farmers Party.
^{3} North Metropolitan Labor MLC Ken Travers resigned on 29 August 2016. Laine McDonald was elected in a countback on 27 September 2016.
^{4} East Metropolitan Labor MLC Amber-Jade Sanderson resigned on 5 February 2017 to contest the Legislative Assembly, while Agricultural National MLC Paul Brown and North Metropolitan Liberal MLC Peter Katsambanis resigned on 6 February 2017 for the same purpose. Sanderson and Katsambanis's vacancies were filled on 4 April 2017 by Bill Leadbetter and Elise Irwin respectively. Brown's vacancy was not being as the National Party gave notice to the Electoral Commissioner that there was no qualified member of that party available to fill the vacancy.
