= Electoral results for the Division of O'Connor =

Australian division election results

This is a list of electoral results for the Division of O'Connor in Australian federal elections from the division's creation in 1980 until the present.

== Members ==
Member	Party	Term
Wilson Tuckey	Liberal	1980–2010
Tony Crook	Nationals WA	2010–2013
Rick Wilson	Liberal	2013–present

== Election results ==
=== Elections in the 2020s ===
==== 2025 ====
2025 Australian federal election: O'Connor
Party	Candidate	Votes	%	±%
Trumpet of Patriots	Lindsay Cameron			
Greens	Giz Watson			
National	Heidi Tempra			
Legalise Cannabis	Philip Arnatt			
Liberal	Rick Wilson			
Labor	Darren Moir			
One Nation	Gemma Johnston			
Christians	Deonne Kingsford			
Total formal votes				
Informal votes				
Turnout				

==== 2022 ====
2022 Australian federal election: O'Connor
Party	Candidate	Votes	%	±%
Liberal	Rick Wilson	43,295	44.76	+2.23
Labor	Shaneane Weldon	25,754	26.63	+6.01
Greens	Giz Watson	10,284	10.63	+2.47
One Nation	Stan Kustrin	6,833	7.06	−1.41
Christians	Justin Moseley	2,779	2.87	+0.22
Western Australia	Morris Bessant	2,366	2.45	+0.87
Great Australian	Brenden Barber	2,337	2.42	+1.50
United Australia	Tracy Tirronen	1,722	1.78	−0.10
Federation	Isaac Middle	1,348	1.39	+1.39
Total formal votes		96,718	94.25	+0.43
Informal votes		5,906	5.75	−0.43
Turnout		102,624	87.12	−4.70
Two-party-preferred result
Liberal	Rick Wilson	55,104	56.97	−8.44
Labor	Shaneane Weldon	41,614	43.03	+8.44
Liberal hold		Swing	−8.44	

Alluvial diagram for preference flows in the seat of O'Connor in the 2022 federal election. indicates at what stage the winning candidate had over 50% of the votes and was declared the winner.

=== Elections in the 2010s ===
==== 2019 ====
2019 Australian federal election: O'Connor
Party	Candidate	Votes	%	±%
Liberal	Rick Wilson	36,135	42.04	−0.63
Labor	Shelley Payne	18,243	21.22	+0.30
National	John Hassell	10,795	12.56	−5.77
One Nation	Dean Smith	7,252	8.44	+8.44
Greens	Nelson Gilmour	7,245	8.43	−1.94
Christians	Ian 't Hart	2,527	2.94	−1.08
United Australia	Anthony Fels	1,598	1.86	+1.86
Western Australia	Peter Swift	1,279	1.49	+1.49
Great Australian	Nicholas Robinson	883	1.03	+1.03
Total formal votes		85,957	93.69	−2.50
Informal votes		5,785	6.31	+2.50
Turnout		91,742	90.03	+1.24
Two-party-preferred result
Liberal	Rick Wilson	55,421	64.48	−0.56
Labor	Shelley Payne	30,536	35.52	+0.56
Liberal hold		Swing	−0.56	

==== 2016 ====
2016 Australian federal election: O'Connor
Party	Candidate	Votes	%	±%
Liberal	Rick Wilson	37,092	42.67	+4.21
Labor	Jon Ford	18,190	20.92	+1.40
National	John Hassell	15,936	18.33	−5.53
Greens	Giz Watson	9,013	10.37	+3.58
Christians	Trevor Young	3,496	4.02	+1.54
Rise Up Australia	Stephen Carson	3,207	3.69	+2.96
Total formal votes		86,934	96.19	+2.12
Informal votes		3,439	3.81	−2.12
Turnout		90,373	88.79	−5.21
Two-party-preferred result
Liberal	Rick Wilson	56,543	65.04	+14.09
Labor	Jon Ford	30,391	34.96	+34.96
Liberal hold		Swing	+14.09	

==== 2013 ====
2013 Australian federal election: O'Connor
Party	Candidate	Votes	%	±%
Liberal	Rick Wilson	32,284	39.13	+0.77
National	Chub Witham	20,914	25.35	−3.50
Labor	Michael Salt	14,234	17.25	+0.14
Greens	Diane Evers	5,627	6.82	−2.04
Palmer United	Michael Lucas	3,581	4.34	+4.34
Christians	Mike Walsh	2,079	2.52	+2.52
Independent	Jane Mouritz	1,431	1.73	+1.73
Family First	Steven Fuhrmann	698	0.85	−0.58
Katter's Australian	Phillip Bouwman	660	0.80	+0.80
Rise Up Australia	Vanessa Korber	595	0.72	+0.72
Citizens Electoral Council	Jean Robinson	407	0.49	+0.03
Total formal votes		82,510	94.01	−0.62
Informal votes		5,256	5.99	+0.62
Turnout		87,766	92.27	−0.53
Two-party-preferred result
Liberal	Rick Wilson	55,486	67.25	−5.75
Labor	Michael Salt	27,024	32.75	+5.75
Two-candidate-preferred result
Liberal	Rick Wilson	42,040	50.95	+4.51
National	Chub Witham	40,470	49.05	−4.51
Liberal gain from National		Swing	+4.51	

==== 2010 ====
2010 Australian federal election: O'Connor
Party	Candidate	Votes	%	±%
Liberal	Wilson Tuckey	31,294	38.36	−10.36
National	Tony Crook	23,538	28.85	+19.68
Labor	Ian Bishop	13,962	17.11	−9.15
Greens	Andy Huntley	7,232	8.86	+1.73
Christian Democrats	Jacky Young	2,221	2.72	+0.09
Ecology, Social Justice, Aboriginal	Geoffrey Stokes	1,298	1.59	+1.59
Family First	Pat Scallan	1,164	1.43	+0.21
Independent	Neil Smithson	500	0.61	+0.61
Citizens Electoral Council	Jean Robinson	375	0.46	+0.08
Total formal votes		81,584	94.63	−1.11
Informal votes		4,632	5.37	+1.11
Turnout		86,216	92.83	−0.22
Notional two-party-preferred count
Liberal	Wilson Tuckey	59,555	73.00	+10.24
Labor	Ian Bishop	22,029	27.00	−10.24
Two-candidate-preferred result
National	Tony Crook	43,693	53.56	+53.56
Liberal	Wilson Tuckey	37,891	46.44	−16.32
National gain from Liberal		Swing	N/A	

=== Elections in the 2000s ===
==== 2007 ====
2007 Australian federal election: O'Connor
Party	Candidate	Votes	%	±%
Liberal	Wilson Tuckey	34,876	45.85	−7.40
Labor	Dominic Rose	15,541	20.43	+1.86
National	Philip Gardiner	13,459	17.69	+8.25
Greens	Adrian Price	5,188	6.82	+0.09
Christian Democrats	Mac Forsyth	2,235	2.94	+0.12
One Nation	Ross Paravicini	1,214	1.60	−2.75
Independent	Michael Walton	1,128	1.48	+1.48
Family First	Stephen Carson	991	1.30	+1.30
Independent	George Giudice	986	1.30	−1.46
Independent	Darius Crowe	237	0.31	+0.31
Citizens Electoral Council	Judy Sudholz	212	0.28	−0.22
Total formal votes		76,067	95.36	+0.85
Informal votes		3,702	4.64	−0.85
Turnout		79,769	94.45	+1.19
Two-party-preferred result
Liberal	Wilson Tuckey	50,625	66.55	−3.84
Labor	Dominic Rose	25,442	33.45	+3.84
Liberal hold		Swing	−3.84	

==== 2004 ====
2004 Australian federal election: O'Connor
Party	Candidate	Votes	%	±%
Liberal	Wilson Tuckey	38,878	53.25	+3.77
Labor	Ursula Richards	13,559	18.57	−1.21
National	Leigh Hardingham	6,895	9.44	+2.09
Greens	Adrian Price	4,910	6.73	+2.00
One Nation	Brian McRae	3,177	4.35	−7.42
Christian Democrats	Justin Moseley	2,060	2.82	+0.66
Independent	George Giudice	2,013	2.76	+2.76
New Country	Jan Hough	639	0.88	+0.88
Democrats	David Thackrah	511	0.70	−1.32
Citizens Electoral Council	Callum Payne	367	0.50	+0.05
Total formal votes		73,009	94.51	+0.43
Informal votes		4,245	5.49	−0.43
Turnout		77,254	93.26	−2.04
Two-party-preferred result
Liberal	Wilson Tuckey	51,389	70.39	+1.30
Labor	Ursula Richards	21,620	29.61	−1.30
Liberal hold		Swing	+1.30	

==== 2001 ====
2001 Australian federal election: O'Connor
Party	Candidate	Votes	%	±%
Liberal	Wilson Tuckey	36,867	49.48	+2.59
Labor	Mark Pendlebury	14,742	19.78	+0.56
One Nation	Ron McLean	8,774	11.77	−3.19
National	Vicki Brown	5,480	7.35	−0.03
Greens	Sandy Davis	3,525	4.73	−0.29
Christian Democrats	Alistair McNabb	1,611	2.16	−0.02
Democrats	Carole Pestana	1,502	2.02	−0.32
Liberals for Forests	Donna Selby	1,167	1.57	+1.57
Independent	Stephan Gyorgy	509	0.68	+0.68
Citizens Electoral Council	Terry Iturbide	338	0.45	+0.18
Total formal votes		74,515	94.08	−1.19
Informal votes		4,693	5.92	+1.19
Turnout		79,208	95.88	
Two-party-preferred result
Liberal	Wilson Tuckey	51,484	69.09	+2.52
Labor	Mark Pendlebury	23,031	30.91	−2.52
Liberal hold		Swing	+2.52	

=== Elections in the 1990s ===
==== 1998 ====
1998 Australian federal election: O'Connor
Party	Candidate	Votes	%	±%
Liberal	Wilson Tuckey	35,383	46.48	−6.92
Labor	Frank Marciano	16,877	22.17	−0.93
One Nation	Frank Hough	10,449	13.73	+13.73
National	Jenny Fowler	6,137	8.06	−7.25
Greens	Mark Douglas	2,845	3.74	+0.27
Democrats	Hannah McGlade	1,799	2.36	−0.93
Christian Democrats	Mac Forsyth	1,343	1.76	+1.76
Australia First	Ian Stiles	1,054	1.38	+1.38
Citizens Electoral Council	Stuart Smith	231	0.30	+0.30
Total formal votes		76,118	95.16	−1.63
Informal votes		3,873	4.84	+1.63
Turnout		79,991	95.33	+0.21
Two-party-preferred result
Liberal	Wilson Tuckey	49,581	65.14	−6.02
Labor	Frank Marciano	26,537	34.86	+6.02
Liberal hold		Swing	−6.02	

==== 1996 ====
1996 Australian federal election: O'Connor
Party	Candidate	Votes	%	±%
Liberal	Wilson Tuckey	38,607	56.00	−12.26
National	Kevin Altham	12,456	18.07	+18.07
Labor	Mick Cole	12,240	17.76	−3.88
Greens	John Hemsley	2,500	3.63	+0.36
Democrats	Neil Munro	2,338	3.39	+0.02
Independent	Stephan Gyorgy	795	1.15	+1.15
Total formal votes		68,936	96.92	−0.35
Informal votes		2,194	3.08	+0.35
Turnout		71,130	95.11	−0.76
Two-party-preferred result
Liberal	Wilson Tuckey	52,099	75.93	+1.91
Labor	Mick Cole	16,514	24.07	−1.91
Liberal hold		Swing	+1.91	

==== 1993 ====
1993 Australian federal election: O'Connor
Party	Candidate	Votes	%	±%
Liberal	Wilson Tuckey	47,777	68.26	+18.21
Labor	John Mason	15,144	21.64	+1.45
Democrats	Pat Howe	2,358	3.37	−0.64
Greens	Anne Lambert	2,287	3.27	−0.35
Independent	John Dunne	1,459	2.08	+2.08
Independent	Jim Lee	963	1.38	+1.38
Total formal votes		69,988	97.26	+0.30
Informal votes		1,968	2.74	−0.30
Turnout		71,956	95.88	
Two-party-preferred result
Liberal	Wilson Tuckey	51,780	74.02	+2.11
Labor	John Mason	18,174	25.98	−2.11
Liberal hold		Swing	+2.11	

==== 1990 ====
1990 Australian federal election: O'Connor
Party	Candidate	Votes	%	±%
Liberal	Wilson Tuckey	33,808	50.1	−2.6
National	James Ferguson	13,943	20.6	−2.5
Labor	Kim Chance	13,635	20.2	−2.6
Democrats	Huw Grossmith	2,706	4.0	+1.6
Greens	Jim Cavill	2,443	3.6	+3.6
Grey Power	Rick Finney	1,009	1.5	+1.5
Total formal votes		67,544	97.0	
Informal votes		2,116	3.0	
Turnout		69,660	95.0	
Two-party-preferred result
Liberal	Wilson Tuckey	48,514	71.9	+1.0
Labor	Kim Chance	18,947	28.1	−1.0
Liberal hold		Swing	+1.0	

=== Elections in the 1980s ===
==== 1987 ====
1987 Australian federal election: O'Connor
Party	Candidate	Votes	%	±%
Liberal	Wilson Tuckey	31,329	49.5	−4.1
Labor	Kim Chance	15,865	25.1	−2.8
National	Trevor Flugge	14,632	23.1	+7.4
Democrats	Shyama Peebles	1,503	2.4	−0.4
Total formal votes		63,329	95.3	
Informal votes		3,112	4.7	
Turnout		66,441	94.8	
Two-party-preferred result
Liberal	Wilson Tuckey	44,695	70.6	+1.4
Labor	Kim Chance	18,632	29.4	−1.4
Liberal hold		Swing	+1.4	

==== 1984 ====
1984 Australian federal election: O'Connor
Party	Candidate	Votes	%	±%
Liberal	Wilson Tuckey	33,405	53.6	+7.6
Labor	Kim Chance	17,382	27.9	−6.7
National	James Ferguson	9,817	15.7	−0.3
Democrats	Denis Kidby	1,740	2.8	−0.7
Total formal votes		62,344	94.0	
Informal votes		3,976	6.0	
Turnout		66,320	95.1	
Two-party-preferred result
Liberal	Wilson Tuckey	43,140	69.2	+7.7
Labor	Kim Chance	19,204	30.8	−7.7
Liberal hold		Swing	+7.7	

==== 1983 ====
1983 Australian federal election: O'Connor
Party	Candidate	Votes	%	±%
Liberal	Wilson Tuckey	29,414	48.6	+8.3
Labor	Kim Chance	19,356	32.0	+8.8
National	Brian Pearce	5,999	9.9	−8.3
National	James Ferguson	3,686	6.1	−8.9
Democrats	Denis Kidby	2,105	3.5	+0.2
Total formal votes		60,560	97.9	
Informal votes		1,303	2.1	
Turnout		61,863	93.8	
Two-party-preferred result
Liberal	Wilson Tuckey		64.1	+1.6
Labor	Kim Chance		35.9	+35.9
Liberal hold		Swing	+1.6	

==== 1980 ====
1980 Australian federal election: O'Connor
Party	Candidate	Votes	%	±%
Liberal	Wilson Tuckey	23,998	40.3	−6.5
Labor	Robert Duncannon	13,814	23.2	+5.0
National Country	Anthony Hassell	10,863	18.2	−8.0
National	Eric Charlton	8,915	15.0	+15.0
Democrats	Guy Wroth	1,994	3.3	−2.0
Total formal votes		59,584	96.7	
Informal votes		2,041	3.3	
Turnout		61,625	94.2	
Two-candidate-preferred result
Liberal	Wilson Tuckey	37,249	62.5	−2.7
National Country	Anthony Hassell	22,335	37.5	+2.7
Liberal notional hold		Swing	−2.7	
