= Paul Brown (Australian politician) =

Australian politician

The Honourable Paul Brown MLC

Member of the Legislative Council of Western Australia
- In office 22 May 2013 – 6 February 2017 Serving with Aldridge, Chown, Ellis, Mazza, West
- Constituency: Agricultural Region

Personal details
- Born: 10 March 1969 (age 57) Geraldton, Western Australia
- Party: National

Paul John Brown (born 10 March 1969) is an Australian politician who was a National Party member of the Legislative Council of Western Australia from 2013 to 2017, representing Agricultural Region. He resigned to contest the seat of Geraldton in the Legislative Assembly at the 2017 state election. Brown worked in agriculture before entering politics.

== Early life ==
Brown was born in Geraldton. He spent his early childhood in Dongara and Exmouth, his father being a fisherman, and then moved to Merredin with his mother after his parents' marriage ended. After Brown's grandfather became ill, the family moved to Perth, where he attended Churchlands Senior High School and Scarborough Senior High School. He went on to TAFE to study horticulture, and subsequently worked as manager of a nursery for a period before starting his own landscaping business. Brown later returned to TAFE to study feedlot management, and began working for the Australian Quarantine and Inspection Service as a stock inspector. He re-entered the private sector after a few years, working in the live export industry.

== Politics ==
Brown entered parliament at the 2013 state election, running second behind Martin Aldridge on the National Party's ticket in Agricultural Region. He had originally been preselected for the fourth position on the ticket, but was elevated to second after two other candidates, Max Trenorden and Philip Gardiner, quit the party to (unsuccessfully) stand as independents. Brown's term in the Legislative Council began in May 2013. In March 2016, he announced that he would be seeking preselection for the lower-house seat of Geraldton at the 2017 state election. The seat is currently held by Ian Blayney of the Liberal Party. Brown was successful in his preselection bid, and resigned from the Legislative Council in February 2017 to meet the constitutional requirements for nomination.

== See also ==
- Members of the Western Australian Legislative Council, 2013–2017
