= Love shadow ministry =

Largest political party not in government

The Opposition in the Australian state of Western Australia comprises the largest party or coalition of parties not in Government. The Opposition's purpose is to hold the Government to account and constitute a "Government-in-waiting" should the existing Government fall. To that end, a Leader of the Opposition and Shadow Ministers for the various government departments question the Premier and Ministers on Government policy and administration, and formulate the policy the Opposition would pursue in Government. It is sometimes styled "His Majesty's Loyal Opposition" to demonstrate that although it opposes the Government, it remains loyal to the King.

The conservative Opposition was previously led by Zak Kirkup of the Liberal Party. In the 2021 election, the Liberal Party ended up winning fewer seats than the National Party, headed by Davies, with the National Party gaining opposition status and Davies becoming the first Nationals opposition leader since 1947.

== Final arrangement ==
Following the 2021 election, the Liberal Party and Nationals Party entered into a formal alliance to form opposition, with National Party being the senior party and the Liberal Party being the junior party in the alliance. Shadow ministerial positions were also held by parliamentary members of both parties. This was similar to the agreements between both parties when they were in government following the 2008 and 2013 elections. Similar to the 2008 and 2013 agreements, the deputy leader of the senior party, Nationals deputy leader Shane Love, was the deputy opposition leader, instead of the leader of the junior party, Liberal Party leader David Honey. Under the alliance, each party maintained their independence, and could speak out on issues when there was a disagreement with their partner.

Shadow Minister	Portfolio	Image
Shane Love MLA	Leader of the Opposition; Shadow Minister for: Regional Development; Transport; Jobs & Trade; Climate Action; Finance; Federal-State Relations; Public Sector Management; Government Accountability; Leader of the National Party	
Peter Rundle MLA	Deputy Leader of the Opposition; Manager of Opposition Business; Shadow Minister for: Education & Training; International Education; Sports & Recreation; Racing & Gaming; Deputy Leader of the National Party	
Merome Beard MLA	Opposition Whip in the Legislative Assembly; Shadow Minister for: Local Government; Tourism; Commerce; Women's Interests	
Hon. Mia Davies MLA	Shadow Minister for: Mines & Petroleum; Electoral Affairs; Aboriginal Affairs	
Hon. Colin de Grussa MLC	Deputy Leader of the Opposition in the Legislative Council; Opposition Whip in the Legislative Council; Shadow Minister for: Agriculture and Food; Fisheries; Ports; Veterans Issues; Regional Communications; Leader of the National Party in the Legislative Council	
Hon. Martin Aldridge MLC	Shadow Minister for: Emergency Services; Regional Health; Road Safety; Volunteering; Regional Cities; Deputy Leader of the National Party in the Legislative Council	
Libby Mettam MLA	Shadow Minister for: Health; Mental Health; Disability Services; Prevention of Family & Domestic Violence; Child Protection; Leader of the WA Liberal Party	
Dr. David Honey MLA	Shadow Minister for: State Development; Water; Hydrogen; Small Business; Science; Innovation and ICT	
Hon. Steve Thomas MLC	Leader of the Opposition in the Legislative Council; Shadow Minister for: Energy; Treasury; Industrial Relations; Deputy Leader of the WA Liberal Party; Leader of the Liberal Party in the Legislative Council	
Hon. Tjorn Sibma MLC	Shadow Minister for: Justice; Defence Industry; MetroNet; Citizenship and Multicultural Affairs; Deputy Leader of the Liberal Party in the Legislative Council	
Hon. Donna Faragher MLC	Shadow Minister for: Community Services; Early Childhood Learning; Youth; Seniors and Ageing	
Hon. Peter Collier MLC	Shadow Minister for Police and Corrective Services; Shadow Minister for Culture and the Arts	
Hon. Neil Thomson MLC	Shadow Minister for: Planning; Environment; Lands; Heritage	
Hon. Steve Martin MLC	Shadow Minister for Housing and Forestry	
Hon. Nick Goiran MLC	No portfolio	

== See also ==
- Opposition (Western Australia)
- Leader of the Opposition (Western Australia)
