= Margaret Rowe =

Australian politician (1949–2022)

Member of the Legislative Council of Western Australia
- In office 22 May 2005 – 22 June 2007 Serving with Chance, Criddle, Donaldson, Fels
- Constituency: Agricultural Region

Personal details
- Born: 11 April 1949 Kalgoorlie, Western Australia, Australia
- Died: 21 March 2022 (aged 72)
- Party: Liberal

Margaret-Anne Bernadette Rowe (née Trahair; 11 April 1949 – 21 March 2022) was an Australian politician. She was Liberal member of the Legislative Council of Western Australia from 2005 to 2007, representing Agricultural Region.

Rowe was born in Kalgoorlie, Western Australia, to Margaret Mary (née Brock) and Archibald Richard Trahair. After previously working in various administrative positions, she served on the Greenough Shire Council in 1994 and from 1997 to 2004. She also worked as a research officer for two Liberal members of the Legislative Assembly – Kevin Minson (from 1996 to 2001) and Jamie Edwards (from 2001 to 2005). Rowe first ran for parliament herself at the 2001 state election, occupying the fifth position on the Liberal Party's ticket in Agricultural Region. At the 2005 election, she was elevated to third on the ticket, and was elected. However, Rowe's time in parliament was short-lived, as she resigned due to ill health in June 2007. She had earlier missed six sitting days without explanation, for which she was found in contempt of parliament and had to apologise. One of Rowe's children, Brad Rowe, was a professional Australian rules footballer.
