= Martin Aldridge =

Martin Aldridge may refer to:

- Martin Aldridge (footballer)
- Martin Aldridge (politician)
