= Anthony Fels =

Australian politician

Member of the Western Australian Legislative Council for Agricultural Region
- In office 22 May 2005 – 22 May 2009 Serving with Chance, Criddle, Donaldson, Duncan, Ellis, Rowe

Personal details
- Born: 19 November 1964 (age 61) Esperance, Western Australia
- Party: Liberal (1980s–2008); Family First (2008–?); Katter's Australian (2013); Mutual Party (2014); One Nation (2016–2017); Non-Custodial Parents (2017–2018); United Australia (c. 2018–2019); WA Party (2021–?); Independent (as of 2025)

Anthony James Fels (born 19 November 1964) is an Australian politician. He was a member of the Western Australian Legislative Council for the Agricultural Region from 2005 to 2009, representing the Liberal Party before defecting to the Family First Party in 2008.

Since leaving parliament, Fels has been a perennial candidate for public office and a member of at least six different political parties.

== Early life ==
Fels was born on 19 November 1964 in Esperance, Western Australia. He is the son of Pauline (née Anderson) and Francis Fels.

Fels grew up on the family farm in Esperance, attending Castletown Primary School and Esperance Senior High School. After leaving university he started a kebab shop in Cottesloe. He later worked for the Primary Industry Bank of Australia from 1989 to 1994 and was active in various business ventures including PKB Watering Supplies, Rowlands Stockfeeds and Liquid Engineering.

== Parliamentary career ==
Fels joined the Liberal Party in the 1980s. He was an unsuccessful preselection candidate for the Roe prior to the 1989 Western Australian state election. He was the Liberal candidate in Roe at the 2001 election but was defeated by the incumbent National MP Ross Ainsworth.

At the 2005 state election, Fels was elected to the Legislative Council representing the Agricultural Region for the Liberal Party. In 2007, he was found to be in contempt of Parliament by a select committee report for giving false answers to a parliamentary inquiry. Despite attempts from the Liberal Party to remove Fels, he resigned from the Liberal Party in August 2008, and attempted to form his own party called People Against Daylight Saving. He later joined Family First. He was leader of WA Family First before they merged with the Australian Conservatives.

== Later candidacies ==
Fels was an independent candidate for the Senate at the 2010 federal election and for the state Legislative Council at the 2013 election, a Katter's Australian Party candidate for the Senate at the 2013 federal election, and a Mutual Party candidate at the 2014 special Senate election.

As of January 2017, Fels was a member of One Nation. At one stage it was reported that he had been preselected as a One Nation candidate at the 2017 state election, but the party later said that he had not yet been endorsed.

Fels was a nominated candidate representing the Non-Custodial Parents Party (Equal Parenting) in the 2017 Bennelong by-election. He came last of 12 candidates with a primary vote of less than 0.2 percent. He was a candidate for Clive Palmer's United Australia Party at the 2019 Australian federal election.
