= Landcare =

Landcare may refer to:

- Australian Landcare Council, a former Australian government body, superseded by the National Landcare Advisory Committee
- Landcare Australia, an Australian community not-for-profit organisation, involving local volunteers repairing the natural environment
- The landcare movement in Australia, begun by farmers in the 1960s
- Manaaki Whenua – Landcare Research, a New Zealand Crown Research Institute whose focus of research is the environment, biodiversity, and sustainability.
- National Landcare Program, Australian Government program providing funding for improving land management practices
