= Bruce Donaldson =

Bruce Donaldson may refer to:

- Bruce Donaldson (politician), Australian politician
- Bruce Donaldson (admiral), Royal Canadian Navy officer

== See also ==
- Bruce-Donaldson House, a historic house in Yankton, South Dakota
