= Dexter Davies =

Australian politician (1951–2018)

Member of the Western Australian Legislative Council
- In office 10 August 1998 – 21 May 2001
- Preceded by: Eric Charlton
- Constituency: Agricultural

Personal details
- Born: Dexter Melvyn Davies; 10 April 1951 Kellerberrin, Western Australia
- Died: 17 March 2018 (aged 66)
- Cause of death: Lung cancer
- Party: National Party
- Spouse: Effie South (m. 1972)
- Children: Mia Davies
- Education: Wesley College
- Alma mater: Western Australian Institute of Technology
- Occupation: Australian rules footballer

Dexter Melvyn Davies (10 April 1951 – 17 March 2018) was an Australian politician.

Davies was born in Kellerberrin, Western Australia, and was a farmer and consultant before entering politics. He also played Australian rules football at a high level, appearing in 14 games for East Fremantle in the Western Australian National Football League (WANFL) between the 1969 and 1971 WANFL seasons. In 1998, Davies was elected to the Western Australian Legislative Council in a countback as a National Party member for Agricultural. He was defeated in 2001.

His daughter, Mia Davies, also became a member of parliament, and the first woman to lead the WA Nationals.

Davies died, aged 66, from lung cancer on 17 March 2018.
