= Rick Mazza =

Australian politician

Member of the Western Australian Legislative Council for Agricultural Region
- In office 22 May 2013 – 21 May 2021 Serving with Aldridge, Brown, Chown, Ellis, West

Personal details
- Born: 17 February 1961 (age 65) Bunbury, Western Australia, Australia
- Party: Shooters, Fishers and Farmers (Note: The party was known as the Shooters and Fishers Party until April 2016, when it changed its name to match the name of the national party.)
- Website: rickmazza.com.au

Ricky John Mazza (born 17 February 1961) is an Australian former politician who was a member of the Legislative Council of Western Australia from 2013 to 2021, representing Agricultural Region. He is a member of the Shooters, Fishers and Farmers Party, and was the first member of the party to be elected to parliament in Western Australia.

Mazza was born in Bunbury, Western Australia, to Carol and Gino Mazza. His father was born in southern Italy, while his mother was a fifth-generation Australian. Mazza spent most of his childhood in Bunbury, also living for periods in Harvey and Northam. After completing an apprenticeship, he spent several years in the mining industry in the South West, working on heavy machinery. At the age of 21, with the money he earned, Mazza was able to open a small service station. However, he sold the service station after two years to enter the real estate industry. He remained in real estate until 2006, when he and his wife retired to a farm in Rocky Gully. Mazza was elected to parliament at the 2013 state election, as one of six members for Agricultural Region. He is a member of various standing committees, and from May 2015 to May 2016 chaired a select committee into the Royal Society for the Prevention of Cruelty to Animals (RSPCA), which concluded that the organisation required both more funding and greater oversight of its operations.
