= Dee Margetts =

Australian politician (1955–2026)

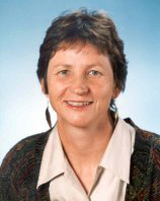

Senator for Western Australia
- In office 1 July 1993 – 30 June 1999

Member of the Western Australian Legislative Council
- In office 22 May 2001 – 21 May 2005
- Constituency: Agricultural Region

Personal details
- Born: 5 March 1955 Fremantle, Western Australia
- Died: 16 August 2026 (aged 71)
- Party: Greens WA
- Education: University of East Anglia; University of Western Australia

Diane Elizabeth "Dee" Margetts (5 March 1955 – 16 August 2026) was an Australian politician and academic. She represented Western Australia for the Greens (WA) in the Australian Senate from 1993 to 1999 and later served in the Parliament of Western Australia as a member of the Legislative Council for the Agricultural Region from 2001 to 2005. After leaving parliament, she undertook postgraduate research examining the impacts of Australia's National Competition Policy.

== Early life and education ==
Margetts was born on 5 March 1955 in Fremantle, Western Australia. She was the daughter of June Elaine and Ernest Joseph Margetts.

She attended John Curtin Senior High School, graduating in 1972, and went on to study arts at the University of Western Australia, majoring in anthropology and English. While at university, she worked part-time as a sales agent for Qantas. In 1979, Margetts moved to England to study development studies at the University of East Anglia, graduating with a Bachelor of Arts (Hons.) in 1982. Her honours thesis examined "the hypothesis that multinational companies invested in developing countries for their own profit."

After returning to Australia, Margetts completed a Diploma in Education at the University of Western Australia and worked as a teacher and librarian at high schools until 1988. She then became Coordinator for People for Nuclear Disarmament in Western Australia, a position she held until 1991.

== Activism and early career ==
Margetts was a foundation member of Greens (WA) and was active in the community and political groups that contributed to the party's formation in 1990. She also worked as coordinator for People for Nuclear Disarmament in Western Australia from 1988 to 1991, campaigning on issues including anti-nuclear advocacy, environmental protection, and Indigenous rights.

== Federal politics ==
Margetts was elected to the Australian Senate at the 1993 Australian federal election as a senator for Western Australia representing the Greens (WA). She commenced her term on 1 July 1993. During her time in the Senate, the Western Australian Greens senators frequently held the balance of power, particularly during the mid-1990s. Margetts served as the Australian Greens whip in the Senate from May 1996 until the end of her term and was a member of several Senate committees and parliamentary delegations. She was defeated at the 1998 Australian federal election, and her term concluded on 30 June 1999.

== State politics ==
At the 2001 Western Australian state election, Margetts was elected to the Legislative Council of Western Australia representing the Agricultural Region for the Greens (WA). She served a single four-year term from 22 May 2001 to 21 May 2005. During her time in the Legislative Council, she was a member of several parliamentary committees, including the Standing Committee on Public Administration and Finance, and participated in debates on environmental regulation, regional services and public sector accountability. She lost her seat at the 2005 state election.

== Later career and academic work ==
After leaving the Western Australian Legislative Council, Margetts undertook postgraduate research at the University of Western Australia, completing a PhD titled A Critique of Australia's National Competition Policy: Assessing its outcomes in a range of major sectors. Her research examined the impacts of National Competition Policy across sectors such as dairy, retail, and water. She has continued to write and speak on competition policy and public interest concerns, and in 2012 was interviewed for the Old Parliament House oral history project.

Margetts died on 16 August 2026.
