= Fluoride Free WA =

Fluoride Free WA Party
- Founded: January 2017
- Merged into: Health Australia Party
- Headquarters: Perth, Western Australia
- Ideology: Oppose mandatory water fluoridation

Website
- fluoridefreeparty.org

Fluoride Free WA Party was a political party registered for elections in Western Australia. Its main policy is to end mandatory water fluoridation in Western Australia. The party is a distinct legal entity from an advocacy organisation named Fluoride Free WA Inc, however, the party was formed by the advocacy group to increase media interest. The party merged into the Health Australia Party in 2019.

Fluoride Free WA Party fielded two candidates in each of the six regions for the Legislative Council in the 2017 Western Australian election. It subsequently also ran John Watt (a vice-president and the treasurer of Fluoride Free WA Inc) as a candidate in the Darling Range by-election in 2018.

Voting for the legislative council uses group voting tickets. Fluoride Free WA Party has participated with four other parties in a set of preference deals orchestrated by Glenn Druery. The other parties are Family First, Liberal Democrats, Flux the System and the Daylight Saving Party. The deals are arranged so that the ticket votes for these five parties roll up to a different party in each region.

== See also ==
- Health Australia Party
- Informed Medical Options Party
