= Sandra Carr =

Western Australian politician

The Honourable Sandra Carr MLC
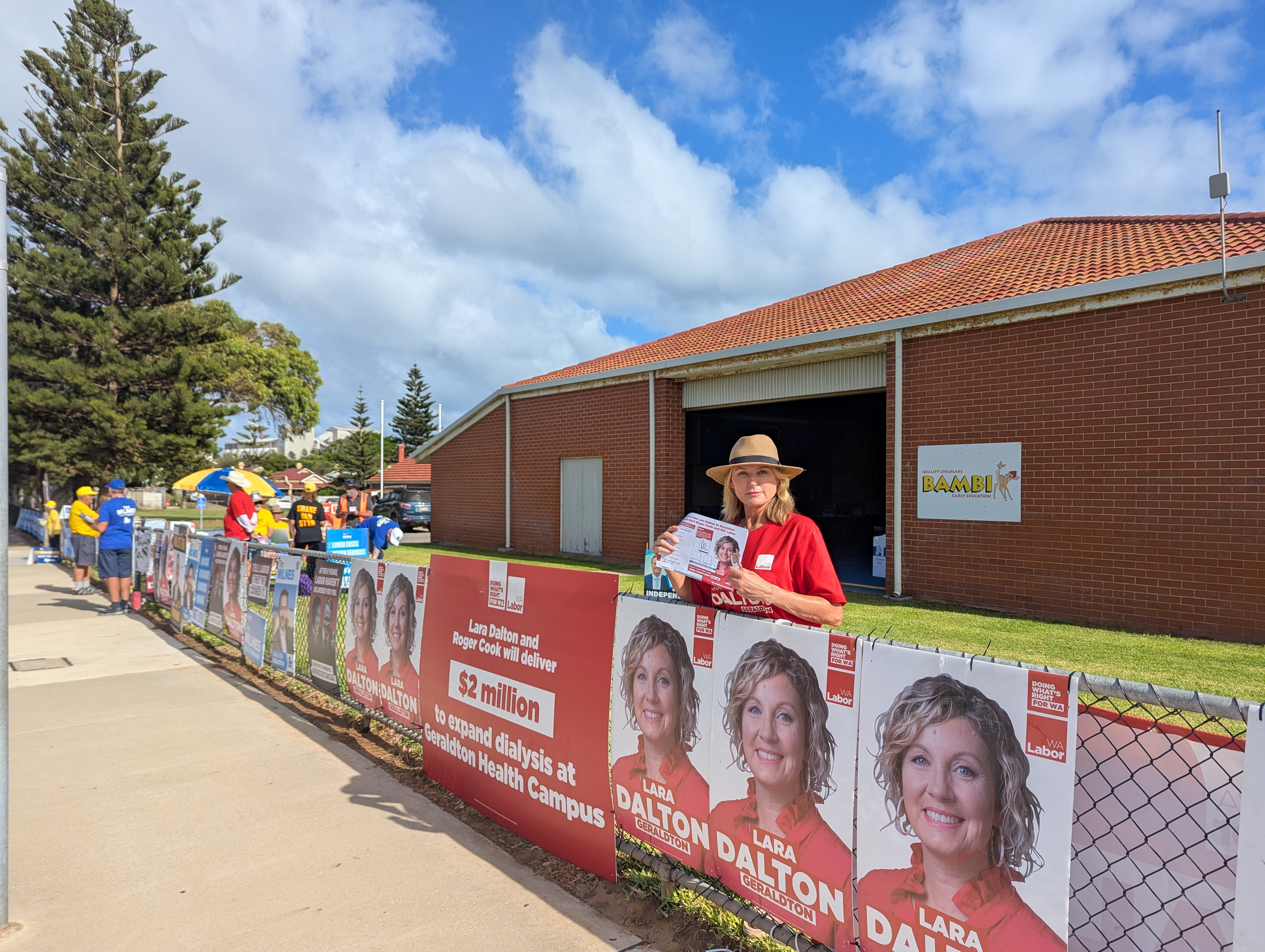
- Sandra Carr (Right) at the 2025 state election handing out for Lara Dalton

Member of the Western Australian Legislative Council for Agricultural
- Incumbent
- Assumed office 22 May 2021

Personal details
- Born: 1971 (age 54–55) Kalgoorlie, Western Australia
- Party: Labor
- Profession: Teacher

Sandra Anne Carr (born 1971) was elected to the Western Australian Legislative Council as a Labor Party member for Agricultural region at the 2021 state election.

Carr was a teacher in Geraldton prior to getting elected.
