= Jennacubbine, Western Australia =

Jennacubbine
- Town
- Interactive map of Jennacubbine
- Coordinates: 31.441°S 116.74°E
- Country: Australia
- State: Western Australia
- LGA: Shire of Goomalling
- Location: 122 km (76 mi) NE of Perth; 25 km (16 mi) N of Northam; 26 km (16 mi) SSW of Goomalling
- Established: 1902

Government
  - State electorate: Moore
  - Federal division: Durack

Area
  - Total: 71.5 km^{2} (27.6 sq mi)
- Elevation: 187 m (614 ft)

Population
  - Total: 56 (SAL 2021)
- Postcode: 6401

Jennacubbine is a small town located in the Wheatbelt region of Western Australia, to the east of Perth between the towns of Northam and Goomalling.

== History ==
The town's name derives from the Noongar name for a well in the area, which may mean "salt water" according to some sources and was first recorded by explorer Augustus Gregory in 1848 as "Jenacubine", with the current spelling being adopted in 1889. Jennacubbine was established as a siding on the railway line from Northam to Goomalling in June 1902.

At this time, Jennacubbine had a hotel, a general store, two other shops, and eight houses in the main street. The main street ended at the front door of the hotel. Several railway huts were constructed on the opposite side of the rail line from the main street, and a Catholic church was constructed in 1905 and was used as a school until 1911. By the 1960s, all that was left was the hotel, the general store and one house.

In 1970 the general store was burnt to the ground, in a late night fire that was reported to have been caused by the store's old kerosene refrigerators. The store was over 100 years old when it was destroyed. A fire truck from Goomalling attended the fire, but its onboard water tanks were dry from a previous fire, and there was no town water in Jennacubbine.

The state's water authority had gazetted that Jennacubbine was to get town water, and pipes had been laid in the ground to the town, but there had been no connections to any building nor any public facilities including fire hydrants.

=== Yarramony crossing incident ===
On 8 July 2000, three teenagers were killed when their Toyota Land Cruiser collided with a southbound grain train at a level crossing near the town on Yarramony Road. The accident led to a Government of Western Australia report on potential methods to increase safety at level crossings. One of the recommendations saw the compulsory fitting of ditch lights on all locomotives operating in Western Australia.

== Economy ==
The surrounding areas produce wheat and other cereal crops. The town is a receival site for CBH Group.
