= Shelley Payne =

Western Australian politician

The Honourable Shelley Payne MLC

Member of the Western Australian Legislative Council for Agricultural
- In office 22 May 2021 – 2025

Personal details
- Born: 3 January 1972 (age 54)
- Party: Labor
- Spouse: Mark
- Children: 3

Shelley Nicole Payne (born 3 January 1972) is an Australian politician who was elected to the Western Australian Legislative Council as a Labor Party member for Agricultural region at the 2021 state election for a four-year term beginning on 22 May 2021. She was unseated in the 2025 Western Australian state election.

Payne was previously a chemical engineer and councilor for the Esperance shire after moving from Canada. She was also a candidate in the 2019 federal election for the seat of O'Connor.

She lives with her husband Mark and their 3 teenage children.
