= Australian Landcare Council =

Australian Landcare Council (ALC) was an Australian government body for landcare, as of June 2020 superseded by the National Landcare Advisory Committee (NLAC). The Australian Landcare Council was the Australian Government's key advisory body on landcare and natural resource management until it was repealed on 5 May 2016.
