= Aaron Stonehouse =

Australian politician

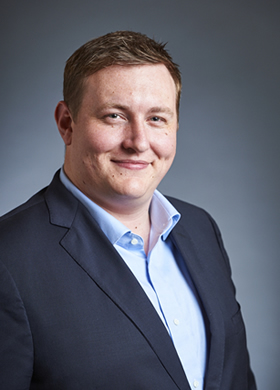
- Aaron Stonehouse MLC

Member of the Western Australian Legislative Council for South Metropolitan
- In office 22 May 2017 – 21 May 2021

Personal details
- Born: 29 June 1990 (age 36) Subiaco, Western Australia
- Party: Liberal Democratic Party
- Website: Official Site

Aaron Stonehouse (born 29 June 1990) is an Australian former politician. He was elected to the Western Australian Legislative Council at the 2017 state election, as a Liberal Democratic Party member in South Metropolitan Region. His term began on 22 May 2017. He lost his seat at the WA State election on 13 March 2021.

== Political career ==
Stonehouse was elected to the Western Australian Legislative Council at the 2017 state elections, as a Liberal Democratic Party member for the South Metropolitan Region. Since his election, he has been a strong and vocal advocate for a range of issues centred upon personal choice, and personal responsibility. He has been an active proponent of drug reform, and has also advocated for a range of amendments to the WA legal system, to allow for trial by judge alone, and to return judicial discretion to property confiscation cases arising from drug declarations.

In September 2019, Stonehouse fulfilled a long-held commitment by tabling a private members bill, the Firearms Amendment (Airsoft) Bill 2019, which would have legalised the popular sport of airsoft in Western Australia. Although still live at the conclusion of the 40th Parliament, the Bill was stalled by the Labor Government who, in spite of a substantial petition in favour of legalisation, refused to support the legislation.

Stonehouse has also been a vocal advocate for the legalisation of vaping in Western Australia. He was appointed as the WA spokesperson for Legalise Vaping Australia in July 2018, and the Parliamentary Select Committee he chaired later that year looking into nanny state laws received considerable evidence on vaping as a potential quitting aid for those who currently smoke. In November 2020, Stonehouse tabled one of the largest petitions received in the 40th Parliament, totalling 7176 signatures, calling for amendments to the Tobacco Control Act 2006 (WA), to legalise the sale of vaping devices in Western Australia, alongside amendments to the Medicines and Poisons Act 2014 (WA), to allow for the sale and use of nicotine in such devices.

An advocate of free market economics, Stonehouse is on the record as stating that he would "not vote for increases in taxes, or new laws that add to the burden of regulation".

In late 2020, the Liberal Democrats WA endorsed Stonehouse to defend his seat as their lead candidate in the South Metropolitan Region at the March 2021 election. He lost, receiving 0.85% of the initial vote and 7.08% after preferences.

Stonehouse's Committee Membership
Committee	Standing/ Select?	Purpose	Position	Term
Procedure and Privileges Committee	Standing	Standing Order 6(3): Recalling The Council	Co-opted Member	19 September 2018 – 4 December 2018
Legislation	Standing	Inquiry into the Ticket Scalping Bill 2018	Substitute	7 August 2019 – 5 September 2019
Legislation	Standing	Inquiry into the Criminal Procedure Amendment (Trial by Judge Alone) Bill 2017	Substitute	21 October 2019 – 12 May 2020
Estimates and Financial Operations	Standing	–	Member	23 May 2017 – 21 May 2021
Alternate approaches to reducing illicit drug use and its effects on the community	Select	–	Member	17 October 2018 – 28 November 2019
Personal Choice and Community Safety	Select	–	Chair	29 August 2018 – 12 May 2020
