= Elise Irwin =

Australian politician

Member of the Western Australian Legislative Council for North Metropolitan
- In office 4 April 2017 – 21 May 2017
- Preceded by: Peter Katsambanis

Personal details
- Born: 1966 (age 59–60) Subiaco, Western Australia
- Party: Liberal

Elise Maxine Irwin (born 1966) is an Australian politician. She was a Liberal member of the Western Australian Legislative Council for North Metropolitan from 4 April 2017, when she was elected in a countback following the resignation of Peter Katsambanis, to 21 May 2017, when the new Legislative Council elected at the 2017 state election took its seats.
