= Charles Smith (Western Australian politician) =

Australian politician

Member of the Western Australian Legislative Council for East Metropolitan Region
- In office 22 May 2017 – 21 May 2021

Personal details
- Born: Charles Leonard Smith; 4 October 1970 (age 56) Hitchin, England, UK
- Party: Trumpet of Patriots (since 2025)
- Other political affiliations: National (until 2016); One Nation (2016–19); Western Australia (2020–21)
- Occupation: Police officer (Western Australian Police)
- Profession: Public servant Politician

Charles Leonard Smith (born 4 October 1970) is an Australian politician. He was elected at the 2017 Western Australian election to represent the East Metropolitan Region in the Western Australian Legislative Council from 22 May 2017 for Pauline Hanson's One Nation. In June 2019, Smith resigned from One Nation to sit as an independent. In May 2020 he joined the Western Australia Party, and stood as their candidate at the 2021 state election, but was defeated.

During the election campaign, the Pauline Hanson's One Nation party arranged a preference deal with the Liberal Party. Smith was one of a number of One Nation candidates who did not agree with the deal, and encouraged voters to make up their own minds.

Prior to entering Western Australian state politics, Smith served as a police officer in Kalgoorlie, specialising in domestic violence and child protection work. He also worked for a period with the Western Australian Department of Mines and Petroleum as a prospector approvals facilitator.

In 2016, Smith unsuccessfully sought Nationals pre-selection for the federal seat of O'Connor. He subsequently left the Nationals, stating to the Kalgoorlie Miner: "My politics is probably different from the National Party; it was more conservative anyway, hence the interest in what One Nation were doing."

In his inaugural speech in the Western Australian Legislative Council, Smith called for tougher law and order measures to tackle crime and a state population policy to reduce growth pressures on Perth. He also warned that community cohesion was in decline:

A growing chunk of the body politic lacks drive and common purpose. Many people feel that their country is at risk of losing the values that made it strong and had it being looked upon with jealous eyes from overseas. Many people feel that their country is slipping away, socially and culturally. They notice the decline in community-mindedness and watch as reminders of our Western Judeo-Christian and British heritage are erased from school curricula and the public sphere. They see the growing entrenchment of asymmetrical multiculturalism, consumerism and hyper-individualism.

On 11 June 2019, Smith informed the President of the Legislative Council that he had resigned from One Nation, citing a "long line of frustrations" with the party.

On 12 May 2020, Smith joined the Western Australia Party and urged fellow independents to join the party.

In 2025, Smith joined Trumpet of Patriots to contest the division of Cowan at the 2025 federal election.
