= Matt Benson-Lidholm =

Australian politician

The Honourable Matt Benson-Lidholm MLC

Member of the Western Australian Legislative Council for Agricultural Region
- In office 22 May 2005 – 21 May 2013

Personal details
- Born: 3 May 1952 (age 73) Albany, Western Australia
- Party: Labor
- Spouse: Jan
- Profession: Teacher

Matthew Francis Benson-Lidholm (born 5 March 1952) is an Australian politician. He was a member of the Western Australian Legislative Council representing the Agricultural Region and Deputy President of the Legislative Council. Elected to Parliament in the 2005 state election, he is a member of the Labor Party.

Prior to entering parliament, Benson-Lidholm was a teacher and taught at Mount Barker Senior High School as well as TAFE and distance education.

Benson-Lidholm unsuccessfully contested the 2023 Western Australian local elections in the City of Albany.

With his wife Jan, he is a prominent breeder of Rhodesian Ridgeback dogs under the Bowbridge prefix.
