= Murray Criddle =

Western Australian politician

The Honourable Murray John Criddle OAM

Member of the Legislative Council of Western Australia
- In office 22 May 1993 – 2 January 2008 (resigned)
- Preceded by: None (new creation)
- Succeeded by: Wendy Duncan
- Constituency: Electoral region of Agricultural

Personal details
- Born: 11 December 1943 Geraldton, Western Australia
- Party: National Party
- Spouse: Delphine (Del) Kaye Williams
- Children: Four daughters
- Occupation: Farmer at Binnu

Murray John Criddle (born 11 December 1943) is a former Australian politician and farmer at Binnu, Western Australia. Criddle was born in Geraldton and educated at Ogilvie Primary School and Christ Church Grammar School. After leaving high school he farmed at Binnu from 1961. He was an active sports participant in the district and played 207 Australian Rules football games for the Northampton Rams.

Criddle was a National Party member of the Western Australian Legislative Council from 1993 to 2008, representing the Agricultural electoral region. He was Minister for Transport from 1998 to 2001 in Richard Court's Liberal-National coalition government.

He was Chairman of the Mid West Development Commission, from 2009-2017, and retired to Horrocks, Western Australia.
