= Laurie Graham (politician) =

Australian politician

Member of the Western Australian Legislative Council for Agricultural Region
- In office 22 May 2017 – 21 May 2021

Personal details
- Born: Laurence William Graham; 21 November 1945 (age 80) Geraldton, Western Australia
- Party: Labor Party

Laurence William Graham (born 21 November 1945) is an Australian politician. He was elected to the Western Australian Legislative Council at the 2017 state election, as a Labor member in Agricultural Region. His term began on 22 May 2017 and ended on 21 May 2021 following his retirement at the 2021 state election.

Graham was a member of Greater Geraldton City Council before entering state politics.
