= Steve Martin (Western Australian politician) =

Australian politician (born 1963)

Steve Martin MLC

Deputy Leader of the Western Australian Liberal Party
- In office 28 February 2024 – 8 March 2025
- Leader: Libby Mettam
- Preceded by: Steve Thomas
- Succeeded by: Libby Mettam

Member of the Western Australian Legislative Council for the Agricultural Region
- Incumbent
- Assumed office 22 May 2021
- Preceded by: Jim Chown

Personal details
- Born: Steven John Martin; 26 February 1963 (age 63) Narrogin, Western Australia, Australia
- Party: Liberal

Steven John Martin (born 26 February 1963) is an Australian politician who was deputy leader of the Western Australian Liberal Party from 28 February 2024 to 25 March 2026. Prior to entering politics he was a third-generation farmer.

In 2020, Martin was pre-selected for the top spot on the Liberal Party ticket in the Agricultural Region over the incumbent, Jim Chown. At the 2021 Western Australian state election, Martin was elected to the Western Australian Legislative Council. He had previously run in that region in 2013 and 2017 but was not elected on either occasion. He also served as a Wickepin town councilor.

On 28 February 2024, Martin was elected unopposed as deputy leader of the Liberal Party under Libby Mettam, following the resignation of Steve Thomas.
