= Bruce Donaldson (politician) =

Australian politician

- In office 22 May 1993 – 21 May 2009
- Constituency: Agricultural region

Personal details
- Born: 22 July 1938 (age 87) Armadale, Western Australia
- Party: Liberal Party
- Profession: Farmer and grazier

Bruce Kirwan Donaldson (born 22 July 1938 in Armadale, Western Australia) was an Australian politician. He was a member of the Western Australian Legislative Council representing the Agricultural region. Elected to Parliament in the 1993 state election, he was a member of the Liberal Party and served until his retirement at the 2008 state election.

He completed his primary education at Gosnells Primary school, then his secondary education at Hale School and finally his tertiary education at Narrogin Agricultural College, where he graduated with honours.
