= Kim Chance =

Australian politician

The Honourable Kim Chance

Member of the Legislative Council of Western Australia
- In office 18 March 1992 – 21 May 2009
- Constituency: Agricultural Region

Personal details
- Born: Kimberley Maurice Chance; 16 November 1946 Perth, Western Australia
- Died: 22 February 2017 (aged 70) Perth, Western Australia, Australia
- Party: Labor

Kimberley Maurice "Kim" Chance (16 November 1946 – 22 February 2017) was an Australian farmer and politician who served as a Labor Party member of the Legislative Council of Western Australia from 1992 to 2009, representing Agricultural Region. He served as a minister in the governments of Geoff Gallop and Alan Carpenter between 2001 and 2008.

== Early life ==
Chance was born in Perth, Western Australia, the son of Hazel Isobel (née Prowse) and Geoffrey Maurice Chance. His uncle, Edgar Prowse, was a Country Party senator. Chance was raised on his father's property at Doodlakine, and then boarded at Wesley College, Perth. He returned to Doodlakine to engage in sharefarming, and later farmed on his own land, initially at Doodlakine and later at Carrabin. Chance served on the executive of the Western Australian Farmers Federation, including as treasurer, and was a state delegate to the National Farmers Federation. He was also a board member of the Water Authority of Western Australia from 1985 to 1992, and a director of the Avon Football Association.

== Politics ==
Chance joined the Labor Party in 1971. He first stood for parliament at the 1983 federal election, running for the House of Representatives in the Division of O'Connor (a safe seat for the Liberal Party). Chance contested three more federal elections over the following decade (in 1984, 1987, and 1990), but lost to Wilson Tuckey of the Liberal Party on each occasion. His share of the vote in O'Connor decreased at every election, both in terms of first preferences and on the two-party-preferred count, although this was consistent with Labor's nationwide trends.

At the 1989 state election, Chance ran in second position in Labor's ticket in Agricultural Region. He failed to win election, but in March 1992 filled the casual vacancy caused by Jim Brown's retirement. Chance was re-elected as the lead Labor candidate in Agricultural Region at the 1993 state election, and at every subsequent election until his retirement. He was included in the shadow ministry in February 1994, when Ian Taylor replaced Carmen Lawrence as leader, and served as a shadow minister under two more opposition leaders (Jim McGinty and Geoff Gallop).

Chance became Leader of the Government in the Legislative Council following Labor's victory at the 2001 state election, and was appointed Minister for Agriculture, Minister for Forestry, and Minister for Fisheries in the new ministry. His three portfolios were combined in July 2001, although fisheries was separated out again in March 2005 and given to Jon Ford. Chance also held responsibility for several of Western Australia's regions, subordinate to the Minister for Regional Development. He remained in the ministry until the Labor government's defeat at the 2008 state election, which he did not contest. His term ended in May 2009.

== Later life ==
After leaving parliament, Chance served for periods as chairman of the Australian Landcare Council and chairman of the Western Australian Fishing Industry Council. He also spent time as a food-security consultant in Abu Dhabi, and helped establish a camel dairy in Dandaragan, the first such enterprise in the country. Chance died in February 2017, aged 70. He had married Susanne O'Rourke in 1974, with whom he had two children.
