= Flux (political party) =

- Leader: Nathan Spataro
- Deputy leader: Max Kaye
- Dissolved: c. 2023
- Preceded by: Neutral Voting Bloc
- Headquarters: 5/155 Clarence Street, Sydney, New South Wales
- Membership (2019): ▲8,000
- Ideology: Issue-based direct democracy
- Slogan: Upgrade Democracy!
- City of Greater Geraldton: 1 / 15 (2017–2019)

Website
- voteflux.org

Flux, also known as Flux the System! and Liberals For Climate – The Flux Network, was a political party and movement that aimed to replace the world's elected legislatures with a new system known as issue-based direct democracy (IBDD). Flux originated in and was most active in Australia, but also had groups existing in the United States and Brazil.

IBDD is similar to liquid democracy, though there are differences. In IBDD, voters would still have the right to vote directly on every issue or delegate their vote to someone else, but unlike in liquid democracy, voters can choose to forgo votes on one issue to use on another issue. This creates opportunity cost between issues and allows voters to specialise their votes on the issues that are more important to them. This specialisation of votes aims to allow citizens to participate effectively in issue-based direct democracy without having to focus on every issue as they would in a regular direct democracy.

== Australia ==
Flux parties were registered in the Australian Capital Territory, Western Australia, Queensland and New South Wales. Flux was registered at a federal level from 2016, but it was de-registered in 2022 for failing to meet the increased requirement of 1500 members.

=== Elections ===
In the 2016 Australian federal election, Flux stood two senate candidates in every state, and one in the Australian Capital Territory under the name "VOTEFLUX.ORG". The group drew first preference votes of between 0.08% and 0.28% in each state, for a national average of 0.15%.

Under the banner of "Flux the System!", Flux nominated 24 candidates for the 2017 Western Australian election – 12 in the Legislative Council and another 12 in the Legislative Assembly. They received first preference votes of between 0.31% and 0.88% in each legislative council region, for a state average of 0.44%, One of the candidates included Lewis Freer, a sitting councillor on the City of Greater Geraldton. The party also controversially ran 26 so-called "fake independents" – candidates who were affiliated with the party but appeared as independents on the ballot papers.

Writing in 2020, ABC election analyst Antony Green noted that Flux "has attracted negligible support" at elections. Despite having no climate policies of any kind, the party changed its name to "Liberals for Climate – The Flux Network" for the 2021 Western Australian state election.

Liberals for Climate, the last registered Flux Party, had their registration cancelled in January 2023. The party's website is no longer online.

== See also ==
- Online Direct Democracy
