= Philip Gardiner =

Australian politician

The Honourable Philip Gardiner MLC

Member of the Western Australian Legislative Council for Agricultural Region
- In office 22 May 2009 – 9 March 2013

Personal details
- Born: 15 December 1946 (age 79) Perth, Western Australia
- Party: Nationals (to 2012); Independent (from 2012)

Philip Warren Gardiner (born 15 December 1946) is a former Australian politician.

Born in Perth, Western Australia, he was a farmer before entering politics; he held a Bachelor of Science (Agriculture) and a Master of Business Administration. In the 2007 federal election, he was the National Party candidate for the safe Liberal seat of O'Connor, coming close to overtaking the Labor candidate on Green preferences and threatening sitting member Wilson Tuckey. In the 2008 Western Australian state election, he was selected as the second National candidate for Agricultural Region in the Legislative Council. He was easily elected; his term began on 22 May 2009. Having previously announced his decision to retire at the end of his term, he instead opted to run on Max Trenorden's independent ticket.
