= Agricultural Region =

Electoral region of Western Australia

Agricultural Region Western Australia—Legislative Council
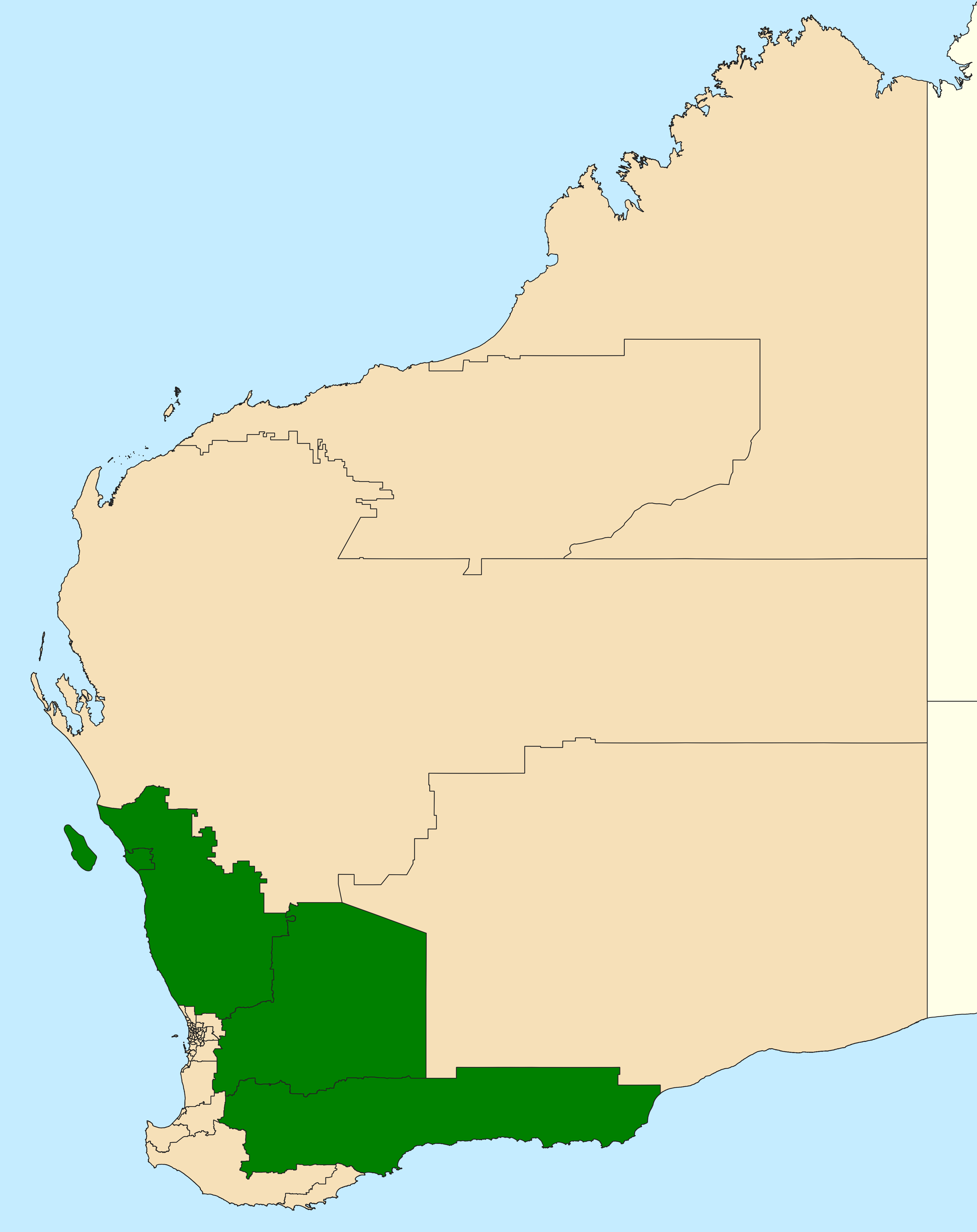
- Location of Agricultural Region in Western Australia
- State: Western Australia
- Dates current: 1989-2025
- Electors: 103,378 (2021)
- Area: 288,922 km^{2} (111,553.4 sq mi)
- Demographic: Rural

The Agricultural Region was a multi-member electoral region of the Western Australian Legislative Council, located in the South West, Peel and part of the Great Southern regions of the state. It was created by the Acts Amendment (Electoral Reform) Act 1987, and became effective on 22 May 1989 with five members who had been elected at the 1989 state election three months earlier. At the 2008 election, it was increased to six members.

The region, along with all other Western Australian Electoral Regions, was abolished in time with the 2025 state election, following legislation passed in November 2021 to create a single, state-wide constituency of 37 members.

== Geography ==
The Region was made up of several complete Legislative Assembly districts, which changed at each distribution.

Redistribution	Period	Electoral districts	Electors	% of state electors	Area
29 April 1988	22 May 1989 – 22 May 1997	Avon, Geraldton, Greenough, Merredin, Moore, Roe, Wagin (7)	80,626	8.89%	267,448 km^{2} (103,262 sq mi)
28 November 1994	22 May 1997 – 22 May 2005	As per 1988	87,137	8.27%	267,448 km^{2} (103,262 sq mi)
4 August 2003	22 May 2005 – 22 May 2009	As per 1988	94,877	7.81%	261,282 km^{2} (100,882 sq mi)
29 October 2007	22 May 2009 – 22 May 2017	Central Wheatbelt, Geraldton, Moore, Wagin (4)	82,479	6.56%	200,091 km^{2} (77,256 sq mi)
27 November 2015	22 May 2017 – 22 May 2021	Central Wheatbelt, Geraldton, Moore, Roe (4)	102,748	6.45%	281,264 km^{2} (108,597 sq mi)
27 November 2019	22 May 2021 – 22 May 2025	As per 2015	103,378	6.02%	288,922 km^{2} (111,553 sq mi)

== Representation ==
=== Distribution of seats ===
As 5-member seat:

Election	Seats won
1989–1993	
1993–1997	
1997–2001	
2001–2005	
2005–2009	

As 6-member seat:

Election	Seats won
2009–2013	
2013–2017	
2017–2021	
2021–2025	

Legend:

Labor
Liberal
National
Greens
One Nation
Shooters, Fishers and Farmers

=== Members ===
Since its creation, the electorate had 25 members, only seven of whom were or are not from either the Liberal or National parties. All five of the members elected in 1989 had previously been members of the Legislative Council—two from the South Province, one from the Central Province, one from the South-East Province, and one from the Upper West Province.

Members for Agricultural Region
Year	Member	Party	Member	Party	Member	Party	Member	Party	Member	Party	Member	Party
1989	Jim Brown	Labor	Margaret McAleer	Liberal	David Wordsworth	Liberal	Eric Charlton	Nationals	John Caldwell	Nationals		
1992	Kim Chance	Labor	Margaret McAleer	Liberal	David Wordsworth	Liberal	Eric Charlton	Nationals	John Caldwell	Nationals		
1993	Kim Chance	Labor	Murray Nixon	Liberal	Bruce Donaldson	Liberal	Eric Charlton	Nationals	Murray Criddle	Nationals		
1996	Kim Chance	Labor	Murray Nixon	Liberal	Bruce Donaldson	Liberal	Eric Charlton	Nationals	Murray Criddle	Nationals		
1998	Kim Chance	Labor	Murray Nixon	Liberal	Bruce Donaldson	Liberal	Dexter Davies	Nationals	Murray Criddle	Nationals		
2001	Kim Chance	Labor	Dee Margetts	Greens	Bruce Donaldson	Liberal	Frank Hough	One Nation	Murray Criddle	Nationals		
2004	Kim Chance	Labor	Dee Margetts	Greens	Bruce Donaldson	Liberal	Frank Hough	New Country	Murray Criddle	Nationals		
2005	Kim Chance	Labor	Margaret Rowe	Liberal	Bruce Donaldson	Liberal	Anthony Fels	Liberal	Murray Criddle	Nationals		
2007	Kim Chance	Labor	Brian Ellis	Liberal	Bruce Donaldson	Liberal	Anthony Fels	Liberal	Murray Criddle	Nationals		
2008	Kim Chance	Labor	Brian Ellis	Liberal	Bruce Donaldson	Liberal	Anthony Fels	Family First	Wendy Duncan	Nationals		
2008	Matt Benson-Lidholm	Labor	Brian Ellis	Liberal	Jim Chown	Liberal	Philip Gardiner	Nationals	Mia Davies	Nationals	Max Trenorden	Nationals
2012	Matt Benson-Lidholm	Labor	Brian Ellis	Liberal	Jim Chown	Liberal	Philip Gardiner	Independent	Mia Davies	Nationals	Max Trenorden	Independent
2013	Matt Benson-Lidholm	Labor	Brian Ellis	Liberal	Jim Chown	Liberal	Philip Gardiner	Independent	Martin Aldridge	Nationals	Max Trenorden	Independent
2013	Darren West	Labor	Brian Ellis	Liberal	Jim Chown	Liberal	Rick Mazza	Shooters, Fishers, Farmers	Martin Aldridge	Nationals	Paul Brown	Nationals
2017	Darren West	Labor	Laurie Graham	Labor	Jim Chown	Liberal	Rick Mazza	Shooters, Fishers, Farmers	Martin Aldridge	Nationals	Colin de Grussa	Nationals
2021	Darren West	Labor	Shelley Payne	Labor	Sandra Carr	Labor	Steve Martin	Liberal	Martin Aldridge	Nationals	Colin de Grussa	Nationals

== Election results ==
2021 Western Australian state election: Agricultural
Party	Candidate	Votes	%	±%
Quota		12,357		
Labor	1. Darren West (elected 1); 2. Shelley Payne (elected 3); 3. Sandra Carr (elected 4); 4. Luke Clarkson	39,263	45.39	+21.39
National	1. Colin de Grussa (elected 2); 2. Martin Aldridge (elected 6); 3. Natasha Colliver; 4. Steve Blyth; 5. Rob Horstman; 6. Ian Hanna	22,999	26.59	−4.72
Liberal	1. Steve Martin (elected 5); 2. Kathryn Jackson; 3. Jim Chown; 4. Maria Girak; 5. Brett Jackson	10,672	12.34	−6.31
Shooters, Fishers, Farmers	1. Stuart Ostle; 2. Ronald Lean	3,572	4.13	−1.52
Greens	1. Peter Leam; 2. Vivienne Glance	2,579	2.98	−0.62
One Nation	1. Rod Caddies; 2. Emma McKinley	1,765	2.04	−9.62
Christians	1. Trevor Young; 2. Les Holten	1,295	1.50	−0.34
Legalise Cannabis	1. Leo Treasure; 2. Keith Clinton	1,150	1.33	+1.33
No Mandatory Vaccination	1. Aaron Horsman; 2. Jessica Young	685	0.79	+0.79
Western Australia	1. Michael O'Loghlen; 2. Allan Butson	462	0.53	+0.24
Animal Justice	1. Courtney Henry; 2. Roberta Vlaar	339	0.39	+0.39
Liberal Democrats	1. Connor Whittle; 2. Cameron Puttick	339	0.39	−0.70
Liberals for Climate	1. Peter Turner; 2. Nathan Thomson	205	0.24	−0.12
Health Australia	1. Bass Tadros; 2. Svetlana Ivanchenko	201	0.23	+0.23
WAxit	1. Russell Sewell; 2. Simon Glossop	186	0.22	+0.11
Great Australian	1. Lawrie Carr; 2. Shane Edwards	185	0.21	+0.21
Sustainable Australia	1. Greg Norris; 2. James Fowler	153	0.18	+0.18
Independent	Parminder Singh	134	0.15	+0.15
Daylight Saving	1. Brett Tucker; 2. Andrew Wilson	69	0.08	−0.14
Independent	1. J. M. David	66	0.08	+0.08
Independent	1. Felly Chandra; 2. Chelsea Henderson	62	0.07	+0.07
Independent	Andrew Ballantyne	36	0.04	+0.04
Independent	Les Mirco	27	0.03	+0.03
Independent	Peter Wallis	25	0.03	+0.03
Independent	Steven Hopkins	24	0.03	+0.03
Total formal votes		86,493	97.77	+0.68
Informal votes		1,969	2.23	−0.68
Turnout		88,462	85.57	−1.63
