= Colin de Grussa =

Australian politician

The Honourable Colin de Grussa MLC

Member of the Western Australian Legislative Council for Agricultural Region
- In office 22 May 2017 – May 2025

Personal details
- Born: 17 April 1973 (age 53) Esperance, Western Australia
- Party: Nationals
- Occupation: Farmer

Colin Stephen de Grussa (born 17 April 1973) is an Australian politician. He was elected to the Western Australian Legislative Council at the 2017 state election, as a National Party member in Agricultural Region. His term began on 22 May 2017 and ended in May 2025.

Prior to this election, de Grussa worked in sales and support for a large computer wholesaler, before undertaking an Associate Degree in Agriculture at Muresk Institute and returning to the family farm.

De Grussa was the state president of the National Party from 2013 to 2015.

In 2014, de Grussa was awarded a Nuffield Scholarship for research into how farmers interact with government for the benefit of their industry.

== Early life and education ==
de Grussa was born in Esperance, Western Australia in 1973. His parents farmed in Neridup, approximately 40 kilometres from Esperance. He attended Castletown Primary School and Esperance Senior High School before moving to Perth to study an Advanced Certificate in Microcomputer Technology at the Central Institute of Technology in East Perth. After working in sales and support for a large computer wholesaler, de Grussa decided to move into agriculture.

de Grussa undertook an Associate Degree in Agriculture at Muresk Institute, where he graduated as dux of the course with distinction.

== Agricultural career ==
After moving back to Esperance and returning to work on the family farm, de Grussa became involved in community and agri-political groups, including as a member of Esperance Rural Leadership, the National Council of Young Farmers and WA Farmers. de Grussa was awarded a Nuffield Scholarship in 2014 which saw him travel across the globe learning about agriculture and regional communities whilst researching how the agricultural industry in other nations interacts with consumers and government.

== Political career ==
de Grussa stood for the Legislative Assembly seat of Eyre in 2013, missing out on election by 125 votes. He was elected to the Western Australian Legislative Council at the 2017 state election, as a National Party member in the Agricultural Region. The Agricultural Region includes the Legislative Assembly electorates of Central Wheatbelt, Geraldton, Moore, and Roe, an area of 281,264 km^{2} (108,597 sq mi). He is currently the Secretary of the Parliamentary National Party and sits on the Standing Committee on Legislation and the Legislative Council's Select Committee into Alternate Approaches to Reducing Illicit Drug Use and its Effects on the Community.

He did not stand in the 2025 Western Australian state election.
