= Phil Edman =

Australian politician

Member of the Western Australian Legislative Council for South Metropolitan Region
- In office 22 May 2009 – 21 May 2017

Personal details
- Born: 24 August 1970 (age 56) Tamworth, New South Wales
- Party: Liberal

Phillip John Edman (born 24 August 1970) is an Australian politician.

Born in Tamworth, New South Wales, Edman arrived in Western Australia in 1976. He owned a cabinet making business before entering politics. After unsuccessfully contesting the House of Representatives seat of Brand for the Liberal Party in the 2004 and 2007 federal elections, he was elected to the Western Australian Legislative Council for South Metropolitan in 2008. His term commenced on 22 May 2009.

== Political life ==
=== Rockingham City Council ===
Edman served as a Councillor with the City of Rockingham from 2005 until 2009, for the ward of Safety Bay.

=== Legislative Council of Western Australia ===
Edman was elected to the 38th Parliament in the Western Australian Legislative Council for the South Metropolitan Region in 2008. His term commenced on 22 May 2009.

He subsequently won re-election in 2013 for the South Metropolitan Region, and was made Government Whip in the Legislative Council on 23 March 2013.

== Misconduct finding ==
In December 2019, in an interim report, the WA Corruption and Crime Commission (CCC) found that Edman had misappropriated his taxpayer-funded electoral allowance, using it for private expenditure on clothing and other items, paying speeding fines, funding a lottery syndicate with 'associates', and docking a private yacht, as well as facilitating intimate relationships with various women. The investigation into Edman started after the CCC investigated the misuse of more than half a million dollars in taxpayer funds by Craig Peacock, who had paid $700 for Edman's visits to 'soapland' parlours in Japan. WA Opposition Leader Liza Harvey expressed her disgust at Edman's behaviour, and asked that the process of expelling him from the Liberal Party be commenced. It was reported that Edman had already resigned.

The CCC had earlier seized a laptop and two hard drives owned by Edman, which had been believed to contain incriminating evidence due to information Edman revealed while his phone was tapped. However, they were forced to return the items as they were subject to parliamentary privilege. The WA Government demanded that the laptop be returned to the CCC for investigation upon the release of the December report.

== Criminal conviction ==
In 2022, Edman pleaded guilty to five charges for obstructing the CCC investigation into his misconduct, and for disclosing restricted information under the law as part of contacting other MPs and his accomplices in his misconduct. He received a seven month suspended jail term, a $12,000 fine, and was ordered to pay $8,263 in court costs.

In a statement, Edman's lawyer stated that his spending of taxpayer money on prostitutes was not malicious or mischievous, and suggested MPs should receive formal training in how to interact with the CCC in case they were investigated as Edman was.
