= Western Australia Party =

- Secretary: Stephen Phelan
- Founded: 2016; 10 years ago
- Headquarters: 19/4 Ventnor Avenue, West Perth, 6005 WA
- Ideology: Regionalism

The Western Australia Party (WAP) is a regional political party active in Western Australia.

The party was founded in 2016 by Julie Matheson, a councillor with the City of Subiaco as Julie Matheson for Western Australia to contest the 2017 state election. In July 2017, the party's name was changed to the Western Australia Party.

The party's ideological focus is regionalism, drawing from the position of Matheson and John Forrest. Its core policies included reform to local government, WA's Family Court, and tax reform.

The party was deregistered in 2023. It was re-registered at the state level in April 2025.

== History ==
Matheson unsuccessfully ran for the Australian Senate at the 2016 federal election as an independent candidate. Following her defeat, Matheson registered the Julie Matheson for Western Australia party in order to contest the 2017 Western Australian state election. The party received just 0.5% of first-preference votes in the Legislative Assembly, and 0.4% in the Legislative Council.

In 2017, the party rebranded as the "Western Australia Party", with the aim of contesting the next federal election on a platform advocating for Western Australia receiving more GST. The party was reported to have received financial support from a group of local businessmen, with retired barrister and judge Peter Nisbet serving as a spokesman and another retired barrister Bevan Lawrence serving on the party's steering committee; Matheson also remained involved. Nisbet stated that the party's "sole objective is to get a better deal with the GST and, secondly, a better share of defence contracts".

In the 2018 Cottesloe by-election the new party polled 9% of first preference votes, and 5.8% of first preference votes in the Darling Range by-election that same year.

As the party was not registered with the Australian Electoral Commission, Matheson contested the 2018 Perth by-election as an independent candidate. After the by-election, the party applied to be registered on a federal level. This registration was granted on 30 August 2018.

In 2019, the party contested its first federal election, running 20 candidates across Western Australia. However, the party again fared poorly, gaining only 1.8% in the House of Representatives and 1.2% in the Senate.

On 12 May 2020, the party gained its first member of parliament when former One Nation MP and Legislative Council member for East Metropolitan, Charles Smith, joined the party.

In August 2021 former Nationals MLC Dave Grills took over leadership of the party from Julie Matheson.

In 2022 former Liberal party member Anthony Fels announced he would be running in the North West Central for WAP.

== Ideology and positions ==
The Western Australia Party has promoted itself as a centrist alternative to the major parties.

The party's centrist image is reinforced through preferences. The party has always used a split-ticket system of preferencing, and at the 2019 federal election, the party's preferences were the most evenly split of any political party in Australia.

Throughout its history, the party has held policies to change advocating tax reform in Western Australia, including a 100% per capita share of the G.S.T., removing payroll and capital gains tax, and the removal of fringe benefits tax. Further policies included reform to the Western Australian Family Court and local government.

In 2023 the Party endorsed the No vote during the 2023 Australian Indigenous Voice referendum.

== Elected representatives ==
=== Current ===
==== City of Melville ====
- Katy Mair (2021−)

==== City of Nedlands ====
- Andrew Mangano (2017−)

=== Former ===
==== Western Australian Legislative Council ====
- Charles Smith (2020−2021)

==== City of Subiaco ====
- Julie Matheson (2016−2021)

== Election results ==
The Western Australia fielded 20 candidates in the 2019 Australian Federal Election, however none were elected.

=== Federal ===
House of Representatives
Election year	# of overall votes	% of overall vote	# of overall seats won	# of overall seats	+/–	Notes
2019	25,298	0.18 (#18)	0 / 151	0 / 151	Steady	
2022	33,263	0.23 (#13)	0 / 151	0 / 151	Steady	

Senate
Election year	# of overall votes	% of overall vote	# of overall seats won	# of overall seats	+/–	Notes
2019	17,213	0.12 (#35)	0 / 40	0 / 76	Steady	

=== Western Australia ===
Legislative Assembly
Election year	# of overall votes	% of overall vote	# of overall seats won	# of overall seats	+/–	Notes
2017	6,145	0.47 (#9)	0 / 59	0 / 59	0	
2021	5,276	0.37 (#11)	0 / 59	0 / 59	0	

Legislative Council
Election year	# of overall votes	% of overall vote	# of overall seats won	# of overall seats	+/–	Notes
2017	5,270	0.39 (#14)	0 / 36	0 / 36	0	
2021	10,496	0.73 (#10)	0 / 36	0 / 36	0	
