= Max Trenorden =

Australian politician (1948–2026)

The Honourable Max Trenorden MLC

Leader of the Nationals WA
- In office 17 October 2001 – 21 June 2005
- Preceded by: Hendy Cowan
- Succeeded by: Brendon Grylls

Member of the Western Australian Legislative Assembly for Avon
- In office 8 February 1986 – 7 August 2008

Member of the Western Australian Legislative Council for Agricultural Region
- In office 22 May 2009 – 21 May 2013

Personal details
- Born: 1 August 1948 Wyalkatchem, Western Australia, Australia
- Died: 22 August 2026 (aged 78)
- Party: Nationals (to 2012); Independent (from 2012)

Maxwell Wayne Trenorden (1 August 1948 – 22 August 2026) was an Australian politician. He was a Nationals member of the Western Australian Legislative Assembly from 1986 to September 2008, representing the electorate of Avon. Trenorden was elected as the Nationals member for the Agricultural Region in the Legislative Council in 2008.

== Life and career ==
Educated in Wyalkatchem Primary then later at Scotch College, Perth, Trenorden worked as a farmer in his early years before spending 18 years as an insurance agent and broker. Trenorden regained the seat of Avon from Ken McIver (ALP) in 1986 and has been successful in holding the seat since. Appointed leader of the Nationals in 2001, Trenorden held the position until 2005. He became Father of the House of the Legislative Assembly in 2005.

Trenorden stood down from the Legislative Assembly just prior to the 2008 election and contested the election as the lead candidate for the Agricultural Region in the Legislative Council. Trenorden gained the seat as the sole Nationals member.

He lost Nationals preselection prior to the 2013 state election and opted to head an independent ticket for the Agricultural Region.

Trenorden died on 22 August 2026, at the age of 78.
