= Darren West =

Australian politician

The Honourable Darren West MLC

Member of the Western Australian Legislative Council for Agricultural
- In office 22 May 2013 – 21 May 2025
- Premier: Colin Barnett (2008-2017) Mark McGowan (2017-2023) Roger Cook (2023-Present)
- Constituency: Agricultural Region

Personal details
- Born: 19 April 1965 (age 61) Edenhope, Victoria, Australia
- Party: Labor
- Parent(s): Howard and Lyn West
- Profession: Farmer, Chairperson
- Portfolio: Parliamentary Secretary to the Minister for Environment; Climate Action; Racing and Gaming from (14 December 2022)
- Website: https://www.parliament.wa.gov.au/

Darren Legh West (born 19 April 1965) is an Australian politician. He was elected to the Western Australian Legislative Council as a Labor Party member for Agricultural region at the 2013 state election. He took his seat on 22 May 2013 and served until 2025.

Prior to his election, West had served as the chair of the Wheatbelt Development Commission, the Sacred Heart Catholic School, and was a farmer at Jennacubbine.

== Personal life ==
Darren West is married to Lesley West and has three children.

Before entering Parliament, West was a farmer around Jennacubbine, and was also the Chair of the Wheatbelt Development Commission.

== Political career ==
Darren West was elected to the Legislative Council of the 39th Parliament of Western Australia on 5 April 2013 as the WA Labor Party member for the Agricultural Region. West was re-elected at the 2017 and 2021 WA state elections. He retied at the 2025 Western Australian state election.

=== Office Appointments ===
- Opposition Parliamentary Secretary for Regional Development, Agriculture and Food, Wheatbelt, Mid West from (19 April 2013 to 17 March 2017)
- Parliamentary Secretary to the Minister for Regional Development; Agriculture and Food; Minister assisting the Minister for State Development, Jobs and Trade from (17 March 2017 to 19 March 2021)
- Parliamentary Secretary to the Minister for Regional Development; Agriculture and Food; Hydrogen Industry from (19 March 2021 to 14 December 2022)
- Parliamentary Secretary to the Minister for Environment; Climate Action; Racing and Gaming from (14 December 2022)

=== Committees ===
- Deputy Chair, Standing Committee on Public Administration (22 May 2013 to 21 May 2017)
- Member, Standing Committee on Public Administration (23 May 2017 to 21 May 2021)
- Member, Standing Committee on Public Administration (25 May 2021 to present)
