= Brian Ellis (Australian politician) =

Western Australian politician

Member of the Western Australian Legislative Council for Agricultural Region
- In office 16 July 2007 – 21 May 2017
- Preceded by: Margaret Rowe

Personal details
- Born: 28 April 1950 (age 75) Wongan Hills, Western Australia
- Party: Liberal
- Spouse: Margaret Gordon (m. 1971)
- Occupation: Farmer

Brian Charles Ellis (born 28 April 1950) is an Australian politician. He was a Liberal member of the Western Australian Legislative Council from 2007 to 2017, representing the Agricultural Region.

Ellis was first elected to parliament on a countback, following the resignation of fellow Liberal Margaret Rowe.

Ellis was born in Wongan Hills, Western Australia. He was a farmer prior to entering politics.
