= Jim Chown =

Australian politician

Member of the Western Australian Legislative Council for Agricultural Region
- In office 22 May 2009 – 21 May 2021

Personal details
- Born: 4 October 1952 (age 73) Sale, Victoria
- Party: Liberal
- Occupation: Farmer

James Edward Chown (born 4 October 1952) is an Australian former politician. He was born in Sale, Victoria, and arrived in Western Australia in 1959. He was a farmer before entering politics.

In 2008, Chown was elected to the Western Australian Legislative Council for Agricultural Region, representing the Liberal Party. He took his seat on 22 May 2009. He was defeated at the 2021 Western Australian state election, and his term ended on 21 May 2021.
