= Martin Aldridge (politician) =

Australian politician (born 1982)

The Honourable Martin Aldridge MLC

Member of the Western Australian Legislative Council for Agricultural Region
- In office 5 April 2013 – May 2025
- Preceded by: Mia Davies

Personal details
- Born: 1982 (age 43–44) Byford, Western Australia
- Party: Nationals
- Spouse: Dale Spark
- Children: Three
- Website: www.martinaldridge.com.au

Martin Aldridge (born 1982) is an Australian politician. He is a member of The Nationals WA and served as a Member for the Agricultural region in the Western Australian Legislative Council.

He was elected to State Parliament on 5 April 2013, following the resignation of Mia Davies.

Prior to this election, Aldridge worked as a farmer, a firefighter, a small business owner, and was the chief of staff to Federal Member for the Division of O'Connor Tony Crook.

== Early life ==
Aldridge was born in Byford, Western Australia in 1982 to farmers Martin and Roxanne Aldridge. At the age of seven, Aldridge moved to Gingin, Western Australia, where he attended Gingin District High School (Years 2-10) before attending Central Midlands Senior High School in Moora, Western Australia for his senior schooling, where he was also Head Boy. While in Moora, Aldridge was a boarder at St James Residential College (also known as the Moora Residential College).

Prior to entering Parliament he was a farmer, small Business Owner, senior Fire-fighter (Fire and Rescue Service of WA), a Ministerial Adviser, MP Chief of Staff and the State Director of The Nationals WA.

== Firefighting career ==
Following a serious flooding event in Moora in March, 1999, Aldridge became involved with local emergency services groups and joined the Gingin Fire and Rescue Service as a volunteer. At the age of 18, he was elected as brigade captain. He spent the next six years as a career firefighter, primarily at the Belmont, Western Australia fire station.

== Political career ==
Aldridge first became involved with The Nationals WA in the early 2000s as a member of the Young Nationals (Australia). He served as a policy adviser to the Minister for Regional Development; Lands and later as the State Director of The Nationals WA. In 2008, he was selected to run for the Legislative Council seat of the Agricultural Region. Following the election of Tony Crook to the Federal Division of O'Connor, Aldridge was appointed as Crook's Chief of Staff.

In 2012, Aldridge was again selected to represent The Nationals WA in the Legislative Council Seat of the Agricultural Region. The Agricultural Region includes the Legislative Assembly electorates of Central Wheatbelt, Geraldton, Moore, and Roe, an area of 281,264 sq.km. During the lead up to the election, Agricultural Region MP Mia Davies resigned to contest the Electoral district of Central Wheatbelt, and Aldridge was elected to fill the vacant position on 5 April 2013. He was re-elected at the 2013 Western Australian state election for a term commencing 22 May 2013.

On 19 March, Aldridge was appointed as the Secretary for the Parliamentary National Party. He has also served as a Member on the Standing Committee on Estimates and Financial Operations (22 May 2013 – 17 August 2015); the Joint Standing Committee on Audit (13 June 2013 – 17 August 2015) and the Standing Committee on Procedure and Privileges (February 2015 – present). During the 2013 State election campaign, Aldridge advocated strongly for the introduction of the Regional Emergency Services Fuel Card Scheme Regional Emergency Services Fuel Card which was introduced on 14 September 2015.

Aldridge was again re-elected at the 11 March 2017 election for a term commencing 22 May 2017 to represent The Nationals WA in the Legislative Council Seat of the Agricultural Region. On 26 April 2017, Aldridge was appointed as The Nationals WA Whip in the Legislative Council. He has also served as a Member on the Standing Committee on Procedure and Privileges (17 February 2015 - 21 May 2017) and was re-appointed 23 May 2017 – present. He also serves as a Member on the Parliamentary Services Committee (23 May 2017 – present).

He retired at the 2025 Western Australian state election.

== Personal life ==
Alridge has two sons and a daughter to his partner, Dale Spark.
