= Results of the 2001 Western Australian state election (Legislative Assembly) =

This is a list of electoral district results of the 2001 Western Australian election.

Western Australian state election, 10 February 2001 Legislative Assembly << 1996–2005 >>
Enrolled voters	1,187,629				
Votes cast	1,075,556		Turnout	90.56%	+0.57%
Informal votes	48,836		Informal	4.54%	+0.15%
Summary of votes by party
Party	Primary votes	%	Swing	Seats	Change
Labor	382,308	37.24%	+1.42%	32	+13
Liberal	319,927	31.16%	–8.61%	16	–13
One Nation	98,321	9.58%	+9.58%	0	± 0
Greens	74,641	7.27%	+2.54%	0	± 0
National	33,450	3.26%	–2.53%	5	– 1
Democrats	27,102	2.64%	–2.44%	0	± 0
Liberals for Forests	16,790	1.64%	+1.64%	1	+1
Christian Democrats	9,893	0.96%	+0.78%	0	± 0
Curtin Labor Alliance	4,120	0.40%	+0.40%	0	± 0
Seniors Party	3,022	0.29%	+0.29%	0	± 0
Independent	55,589	5.41%	–2.42%	3	± 0
Not affiliated	1,557	0.15%	-0.75%	0	± 0
Total	1,026,720			57	
Two-party-preferred
Labor	538,759	52.92%	+8.09%		
Liberal/National	479,209	47.08%	–8.09%		

== Results by electoral district ==
=== Albany ===
2001 Western Australian state election: Albany
Party	Candidate	Votes	%	±%
Liberal	Kevin Prince	4,141	33.0	−24.9
Labor	Peter Watson	3,960	31.6	−2.2
One Nation	Darrall Simpson	2,035	16.2	+16.2
Greens	Sandy Davis	1,060	8.5	+8.5
Liberals for Forests	Diane Evers	1,001	8.0	+8.0
Curtin Labor Alliance	John Watson	334	2.7	+2.7
Total formal votes		12,531	95.7	+0.3
Informal votes		561	4.3	−0.3
Turnout		13,092	91.8	
Two-party-preferred result
Labor	Peter Watson	6,660	53.7	+15.6
Liberal	Kevin Prince	5,748	46.3	−15.6
Labor gain from Liberal		Swing	+15.6	

=== Alfred Cove ===
2001 Western Australian state election: Alfred Cove
Party	Candidate	Votes	%	±%
Liberal	Doug Shave	7,150	32.8	−17.1
Liberals for Forests	Janet Woollard	4,425	20.3	+20.3
Independent	Denise Brailey	4,390	20.1	+20.1
Greens	Elizabeth Peak	1,471	6.7	+6.7
Independent	Pam Neesham	1,222	5.6	+5.6
One Nation	Terry Corbett	1,177	5.4	+5.4
Independent	John Grayden	958	4.4	+4.4
Democrats	Jamie Paterson	618	2.8	+2.8
Christian Democrats	Amanda-Sue Markham	388	1.8	+1.8
Total formal votes		21,799	96.6	−0.8
Informal votes		758	3.4	+0.8
Turnout		22,557	91.8	
Two-candidate-preferred result
Liberals for Forests	Janet Woollard	12,396	57.4	+57.4
Liberal	Doug Shave	9,210	42.6	−9.8
Liberals for Forests gain from Liberal		Swing	+57.4	

=== Armadale ===
2001 Western Australian state election: Armadale
Party	Candidate	Votes	%	±%
Labor	Alannah MacTiernan	10,055	45.7	+1.3
Independent	Roger Stubbs	5,328	24.2	+24.2
One Nation	Colin Butler	2,980	13.5	+13.5
Christian Democrats	Madeleine Goiran	1,372	6.2	+6.2
Greens	Thomas Chvojka	1,339	6.1	+6.1
Democrats	John Hoare	613	2.8	−2.8
Curtin Labor Alliance	Everald Curtis	318	1.4	+1.4
Total formal votes		22,005	94.4	−0.6
Informal votes		1,308	5.6	+0.6
Turnout		23,313	91.2	
Two-candidate-preferred result
Labor	Alannah MacTiernan	12,459	57.1	+3.1
Independent	Roger Stubbs	9,342	42.9	+42.9
Labor hold		Swing	+3.1	

=== Avon ===
2001 Western Australian state election: Avon
Party	Candidate	Votes	%	±%
National	Max Trenorden	2,965	24.9	−36.0
Labor	Phil Shearer	2,847	23.9	−3.7
One Nation	Ken Collins	2,202	18.5	+18.5
Liberal	Joanne Burges	1,905	16.0	+16.0
Independent	Peter Morton	1,026	8.6	+8.6
Greens	Kate Elsey	657	5.5	+5.5
Curtin Labor Alliance	Stuart Smith	288	2.4	+2.4
Total formal votes		11,890	95.8	+0.4
Informal votes		522	4.2	−0.4
Turnout		12,412	92.6	
Two-party-preferred result
National	Max Trenorden	6,395	54.8	−12.0
Labor	Phil Shearer	5,269	45.2	+12.0
National hold		Swing	−12.0	

=== Ballajura ===
2001 Western Australian state election: Ballajura
Party	Candidate	Votes	%	±%
Labor	John D'Orazio	11,549	47.1	+6.6
Liberal	Rhonda Parker	9,452	38.5	−5.0
One Nation	Carl Evans	1,405	5.7	+5.7
Greens	Rosalba Jeffreys	993	4.0	+0.7
Democrats	Jason Meotti	593	2.4	−0.7
Christian Democrats	Patrick Cranley	544	2.2	+2.2
Total formal votes		24,536	95.0	+0.7
Informal votes		1,300	5.0	−0.7
Turnout		25,836	93.0	
Two-party-preferred result
Labor	John D'Orazio	13,428	55.0	+5.1
Liberal	Rhonda Parker	11,007	45.0	−5.1
Labor gain from Liberal		Swing	+5.1	

=== Bassendean ===
2001 Western Australian state election: Bassendean
Party	Candidate	Votes	%	±%
Labor	Clive Brown	12,012	56.1	+1.9
Liberal	Ramesh Somasunderam	4,179	19.5	−13.8
One Nation	Sandra Vinciullo	1,979	9.2	+9.2
Greens	Leanne Lewis	1,752	8.2	+8.2
Christian Democrats	Colleen Tapley	752	3.5	+3.5
Democrats	Jack Fox	751	3.5	−9.0
Total formal votes		21,425	93.5	−0.6
Informal votes		1,480	6.5	+0.6
Turnout		22,905	91.2	
Two-party-preferred result
Labor	Clive Brown	14,707	69.1	+7.1
Liberal	Ramesh Somasunderam	6,562	30.9	−7.1
Labor hold		Swing	+7.1	

=== Belmont ===
2001 Western Australian state election: Belmont
Party	Candidate	Votes	%	±%
Labor	Eric Ripper	11,363	51.8	+3.8
Liberal	Glenys Godfrey	5,360	24.4	−12.5
One Nation	Bill Gaugg	2,375	10.8	+10.8
Greens	Cliff Holdom	1,253	5.7	−2.7
Democrats	Richard Aguero	909	4.1	−2.6
Christian Democrats	Brett Crook	673	3.1	+3.1
Total formal votes		21,933	94.1	+0.2
Informal votes		1,383	5.9	−0.2
Turnout		23,316	90.9	
Two-party-preferred result
Labor	Eric Ripper	14,049	64.7	+7.2
Liberal	Glenys Godfrey	7,659	35.3	−7.2
Labor hold		Swing	+7.2	

=== Bunbury ===
2001 Western Australian state election: Bunbury
Party	Candidate	Votes	%	±%
Liberal	Ian Osborne	4,260	36.2	−11.5
Labor	Tony Dean	4,092	34.7	+1.2
One Nation	Alan Giorgi	1,233	10.5	+10.5
Independent	Brendan Kelly	1,128	9.6	+9.6
Greens	Marilyn Palmer	749	6.4	+1.2
Democrats	Ron Hellyer	149	1.3	−1.0
Independent	Alfred Bussell	68	0.6	+0.6
Independent	Geoffrey	52	0.4	+0.4
Independent	Mary Lupi	48	0.4	+0.4
Total formal votes		11,779	95.6	−0.4
Informal votes		548	4.4	+0.4
Turnout		12,327	90.7	
Two-party-preferred result
Labor	Tony Dean	6,020	51.5	+6.8
Liberal	Ian Osborne	5,674	48.5	−6.8
Labor gain from Liberal		Swing	+6.8	

=== Burrup ===
2001 Western Australian state election: Burrup
Party	Candidate	Votes	%	±%
Labor	Fred Riebeling	4,899	55.3	+7.8
Liberal	Robin Vandenberg	2,453	27.7	−11.1
One Nation	Chris Dempsey	993	11.2	+11.2
Greens	Scott Ryan	519	5.9	+5.9
Total formal votes		8,864	96.1	−0.1
Informal votes		358	3.9	+0.1
Turnout		9,222	85.4	
Two-party-preferred result
Labor	Fred Riebeling	5,749	65.0	+13.3
Liberal	Robin Vandenberg	3,091	35.0	−13.3
Labor hold		Swing	+13.3	

=== Carine ===
2001 Western Australian state election: Carine
Party	Candidate	Votes	%	±%
Liberal	Katie Hodson-Thomas	9,746	44.3	−2.2
Labor	Vijay Kumar	5,248	23.9	+7.1
Liberals for Forests	Carol Clarke	2,810	12.8	+12.8
Greens	Phill Farren	1,439	6.5	+0.1
One Nation	Gary Evans	1,229	5.6	+5.6
Democrats	Helen van Noort	676	3.1	+3.1
Christian Democrats	Ray Moran	668	3.0	+3.0
Seniors	Eleanor Bell	180	0.8	+0.8
Total formal votes		21,996	96.3	−1.3
Informal votes		845	3.7	+1.3
Turnout		22,841	92.2	
Two-party-preferred result
Liberal	Katie Hodson-Thomas	13,110	60.0	+7.8
Labor	Vijay Kumar	8,746	40.0	+40.0
Liberal hold		Swing	+7.8	

=== Churchlands ===
2001 Western Australian state election: Churchlands
Party	Candidate	Votes	%	±%
Independent	Liz Constable	9,814	46.6	−36.6
Liberal	Marlene Anderton	5,583	26.5	+26.5
Labor	David Michael	3,437	16.3	−0.5
Greens	Candice Heedes	1,229	5.8	+5.8
Christian Democrats	Mary Minorgan	594	2.8	+2.8
Democrats	Christine Emerson	411	2.0	+2.0
Total formal votes		21,068	97.2	−0.5
Informal votes		602	2.8	+0.5
Turnout		21,670	91.1	
Two-candidate-preferred result
Independent	Liz Constable	14,557	69.2	−14.0
Liberal	Marlene Anderton	6,470	30.8	+30.8
Independent hold		Swing	−14.0	

=== Cockburn ===
2001 Western Australian state election: Cockburn
Party	Candidate	Votes	%	±%
Labor	Fran Logan	12,527	53.9	+3.0
Liberal	Sandra Comley	5,453	23.5	−10.0
Greens	Heather Smedley	2,610	11.2	+2.6
One Nation	Jerry Gier	1,722	7.4	+7.4
Democrats	Andrew Donaldson	912	3.9	−3.1
Total formal votes		23,224	94.1	+0.0
Informal votes		1,447	5.9	−0.0
Turnout		24,671	92.8	
Two-party-preferred result
Labor	Fran Logan	15,693	68.3	+7.7
Liberal	Sandra Comley	7,289	31.7	−7.7
Labor hold		Swing	+7.7	

=== Collie ===
2001 Western Australian state election: Collie
Party	Candidate	Votes	%	±%
Labor	Mick Murray	4,162	34.7	−6.0
National	Hilda Turnbull	2,922	24.4	−34.9
Liberal	Steve Thomas	1,897	15.8	+15.8
One Nation	Jan Hough	1,811	15.1	+15.1
Greens	Peter Murphy	844	7.0	+7.0
Independent	Frank Marciano	191	1.6	+1.6
Independent	Andrew Williams	163	1.4	+1.4
Total formal votes		11,990	95.3	−2.2
Informal votes		588	4.7	+2.2
Turnout		12,578	93.7	
Two-party-preferred result
Labor	Mick Murray	5,947	50.1	+9.4
National	Hilda Turnbull	5,913	49.9	−9.4
Labor gain from National		Swing	+9.4	

=== Cottesloe ===
2001 Western Australian state election: Cottesloe
Party	Candidate	Votes	%	±%
Liberal	Colin Barnett	11,034	51.9	−8.6
Labor	Simon Nield	4,946	23.3	+5.2
Greens	Steve Walker	3,046	14.3	+0.5
One Nation	Dianne Kenworthy	1,138	5.4	+5.4
Democrats	Andrew Winchester	1,104	5.2	−2.3
Total formal votes		21,268	97.3	+0.1
Informal votes		600	2.7	−0.1
Turnout		21,868	88.8	
Two-party-preferred result
Liberal	Colin Barnett	12,998	61.3	−8.5
Labor	Simon Nield	8,189	38.7	+8.5
Liberal hold		Swing	−8.5	

=== Darling Range ===
2001 Western Australian state election: Darling Range
Party	Candidate	Votes	%	±%
Liberal	John Day	8,274	36.1	−18.8
Labor	Geoff Stallard	7,231	31.5	+4.0
Liberals for Forests	Frank Lindsey	2,381	10.4	+10.4
One Nation	Tom Greig	2,248	9.8	+9.8
Greens	Cathrine Hall	1,874	8.2	−0.4
Democrats	Gail Kelly	926	4.0	−5.0
Total formal votes		22,934	95.9	+0.7
Informal votes		978	4.1	−0.7
Turnout		23,912	92.7	
Two-party-preferred result
Liberal	John Day	11,417	50.3	−12.6
Labor	Geoff Stallard	11,280	49.7	+12.6
Liberal hold		Swing	−12.6	

=== Dawesville ===
2001 Western Australian state election: Dawesville
Party	Candidate	Votes	%	±%
Liberal	Arthur Marshall	6,140	41.3	−8.7
Labor	John Hughes	5,402	36.3	+3.2
One Nation	Carl Dacheff	1,890	12.7	+12.7
Greens	Matthew Bartley	929	6.2	+6.2
Independent	Don Pember	512	3.4	+3.4
Total formal votes		14,873	96.6	−0.2
Informal votes		531	3.4	+0.2
Turnout		15,404	90.0	
Two-party-preferred result
Liberal	Arthur Marshall	7,812	52.9	−7.0
Labor	John Hughes	6,957	47.1	+7.0
Liberal hold		Swing	−7.0	

=== Eyre ===
2001 Western Australian state election: Eyre
Party	Candidate	Votes	%	±%
Labor	John Bowler	3,143	42.4	−14.8
Liberal	Laurie Ayers	1,922	25.9	+4.7
One Nation	Neville Smith	1,310	17.7	+17.7
Independent	Suzie Williams	1,036	14.0	+14.0
Total formal votes		7,411	95.5	+0.5
Informal votes		347	4.5	−0.5
Turnout		7,758	82.4	
Two-party-preferred result
Labor	John Bowler	4,252	57.9	−3.1
Liberal	Laurie Ayers	3,092	42.1	+42.1
Labor hold		Swing	−3.1	

=== Fremantle ===
2001 Western Australian state election: Fremantle
Party	Candidate	Votes	%	±%
Labor	Jim McGinty	9,518	47.2	+1.4
Liberal	Rita Scolaro	4,941	24.5	−8.1
Greens	Ian Alexander	3,434	17.0	+2.5
One Nation	Bob Johnston	979	4.9	+4.9
Democrats	William Hall	694	3.4	−3.7
Independent	Steve Ratcliffe	383	1.9	+1.9
Independent	Anthony Benbow	112	0.6	+0.6
Seniors	Fred Parker	90	0.4	+0.4
Total formal votes		20,151	92.8	−1.9
Informal votes		1,558	7.2	+1.9
Turnout		21,709	89.2	
Two-party-preferred result
Labor	Jim McGinty	13,448	67.2	+5.9
Liberal	Rita Scolaro	6,553	32.8	−5.9
Labor hold		Swing	+5.9	

=== Geraldton ===
2001 Western Australian state election: Geraldton
Party	Candidate	Votes	%	±%
Labor	Shane Hill	2,705	26.8	−8.2
Liberal	Bob Bloffwitch	2,469	24.5	−25.8
One Nation	Ross Paravicini	2,121	21.0	+21.0
Independent	Jackie Healy	1,298	12.9	+12.9
National	Brendin Flanigan	935	9.3	+9.3
Independent	Ron Ashplant	295	2.9	+2.9
Independent	Michael Walton	107	1.1	+1.1
Independent	Mark Douglas	79	0.8	+0.8
Independent	Don Rolston	61	0.6	+0.6
Independent	Noel Sharp	19	0.2	+0.2
Independent	Stephen Gyorgy	8	0.1	+0.1
Total formal votes		10,097	95.4	−0.7
Informal votes		489	4.6	+0.7
Turnout		10,586	89.7	
Two-party-preferred result
Labor	Shane Hill	5,393	54.3	+11.3
Liberal	Bob Bloffwitch	4,538	45.7	−11.3
Labor gain from Liberal		Swing	+11.3	

=== Girrawheen ===
2001 Western Australian state election: Girrawheen
Party	Candidate	Votes	%	±%
Labor	Margaret Quirk	10,598	54.1	−1.8
Liberal	Isabelle Adams	4,521	23.1	−9.5
One Nation	Andy Nebro	1,637	8.4	+8.4
Greens	Katherine Navarro	1,204	6.2	+6.2
Independent	Keith Mynard	981	5.0	+5.0
Democrats	Jim Kerr	636	3.2	−8.3
Total formal votes		19,577	93.8	+0.6
Informal votes		1,304	6.2	−0.6
Turnout		20,881	90.1	
Two-party-preferred result
Labor	Margaret Quirk	13,197	68.4	+5.8
Liberal	Isabelle Adams	6,086	31.6	−5.8
Labor hold		Swing	+5.8	

=== Greenough ===
2001 Western Australian state election: Greenough
Party	Candidate	Votes	%	±%
Liberal	Jamie Edwards	4,439	35.4	−36.7
One Nation	Pam McCagh	3,455	27.5	+27.5
Labor	Michelle Bone	2,589	20.6	−7.3
National	Kevin Altham	1,279	10.2	+10.2
Independent	David Whitehead	783	6.2	+6.2
Total formal votes		12,545	96.9	0.0
Informal votes		405	3.1	0.0
Turnout		12,950	90.3	
Notional two-party-preferred count
Liberal	Jamie Edwards	7,322	59.4	−12.7
Labor	Michelle Bone	5,008	40.6	+12.7
Two-candidate-preferred result
Liberal	Jamie Edwards	7,367	59.3	−12.8
One Nation	Pam McCagh	5,057	40.7	+40.7
Liberal hold		Swing	−12.8	

=== Hillarys ===
2001 Western Australian state election: Hillarys
Party	Candidate	Votes	%	±%
Liberal	Rob Johnson	9,570	40.1	−13.2
Labor	Lorraine Allen	8,359	35.0	+2.2
Greens	Andrew Roy	2,287	9.6	+9.6
One Nation	Sue Collins	1,660	7.0	+7.0
Democrats	Clive Oliver	764	3.2	−10.6
Christian Democrats	Stuart Chapman	680	2.8	+2.8
Independent	Eugene Hands	553	2.3	+2.3
Total formal votes		23,873	95.5	−0.1
Informal votes		1,123	4.5	+0.1
Turnout		24,996	91.4	
Two-party-preferred result
Liberal	Rob Johnson	12,111	51.0	−8.9
Labor	Lorraine Allen	11,616	49.0	+8.9
Liberal hold		Swing	−8.9	

=== Innaloo ===
2001 Western Australian state election: Innaloo
Party	Candidate	Votes	%	±%
Labor	John Quigley	8,832	41.4	+5.8
Liberal	Wayne McCurry	7,622	35.7	−10.4
Greens	Emmie Lister	1,756	8.2	+0.6
Independent	Mark Beaver	1,218	5.7	+5.7
One Nation	Evelyn Grove	1,116	5.2	+5.2
Democrats	Graham Brown	794	3.7	−2.7
Total formal votes		21,338	94.8	+0.1
Informal votes		1,179	5.2	−0.1
Turnout		22,517	89.4	
Two-party-preferred result
Labor	John Quigley	11,554	54.5	+8.5
Liberal	Wayne McCurry	9,652	45.5	−8.5
Labor gain from Liberal		Swing	+8.5	

=== Joondalup ===
2001 Western Australian state election: Joondalup
Party	Candidate	Votes	%	±%
Liberal	Chris Baker	10,124	39.1	−8.4
Labor	Tony O'Gorman	9,742	37.6	+2.6
Greens	Steve Magyar	2,345	9.1	+2.2
One Nation	Jeanette Radisich	1,788	6.9	+6.9
Christian Democrats	Helen Sawyer	818	3.2	+3.2
Democrats	Sarah Gilfillan	810	3.1	−2.5
Seniors	Michael Mortimer	254	1.0	+1.0
Total formal votes		25,881	95.8	+0.1
Informal votes		1,124	4.2	−0.1
Turnout		27,005	92.2	
Two-party-preferred result
Labor	Tony O'Gorman	13,035	50.8	+6.3
Liberal	Chris Baker	12,649	49.2	−6.3
Labor gain from Liberal		Swing	+6.3	

=== Kalgoorlie ===
2001 Western Australian state election: Kalgoorlie
Party	Candidate	Votes	%	±%
Labor	Megan Anwyl	4,168	38.9	−7.8
Liberal	Matt Birney	4,160	38.8	+6.6
One Nation	Guy Hopkins	1,122	10.5	+10.5
Greens	Deborah Botica	401	3.7	+3.7
Independent	Duncan Griffin	392	3.7	+3.7
Independent	Don Green	332	3.1	+3.1
Curtin Labor Alliance	Ian Burt	138	1.3	+1.3
Total formal votes		10,713	95.9	−0.7
Informal votes		455	4.1	+0.7
Turnout		11,168	86.0	
Two-party-preferred result
Liberal	Matt Birney	5,447	51.1	+5.5
Labor	Megan Anwyl	5,205	48.9	−5.5
Liberal gain from Labor		Swing	+5.5	

=== Kimberley ===
2001 Western Australian state election: Kimberley
Party	Candidate	Votes	%	±%
Labor	Carol Martin	4,035	42.2	+42.2
Liberal	Lyne Page	1,545	16.2	−11.9
National	Peter McCumstie	1,527	16.0	+7.2
One Nation	Wayne Boys	1,003	10.5	+10.5
Independent	Mike Wevers	865	9.1	+9.1
Greens	Andrei Nikulinsky	424	4.4	+4.4
Curtin Labor Alliance	Byrne Terry	155	1.6	+1.6
Total formal votes		9,554	95.3	−1.6
Informal votes		466	4.7	+1.6
Turnout		10,020	74.5	
Two-party-preferred result
Labor	Carol Martin	5,756	60.5	+60.5
Liberal	Lyne Page	3,752	39.5	+1.0
Labor gain from Independent		Swing	+60.5	

=== Kingsley ===
2001 Western Australian state election: Kingsley
Party	Candidate	Votes	%	±%
Liberal	Cheryl Edwardes	9,585	41.9	−12.5
Labor	Jon Davies	7,788	34.0	+1.5
One Nation	Susan Mansell	1,565	6.8	+6.8
Greens	Jemma Tyley	1,426	6.2	+6.2
Democrats	Kerry Lock	865	3.8	−9.4
Christian Democrats	Mike Ewers	831	3.6	+3.6
Liberals for Forests	Pamela Dell	823	3.6	+3.6
Total formal votes		22,883	95.7	+0.4
Informal votes		1,018	4.3	−0.4
Turnout		23,901	93.5	
Two-party-preferred result
Liberal	Cheryl Edwardes	12,027	52.9	−7.3
Labor	Jon Davies	10,710	47.1	+7.3
Liberal hold		Swing	−7.3	

=== Mandurah ===
2001 Western Australian state election: Mandurah
Party	Candidate	Votes	%	±%
Labor	David Templeman	5,077	40.3	+1.0
Liberal	Roger Nicholls	4,394	34.9	−12.6
One Nation	Martin Suter	1,586	12.6	+12.6
Seniors	Don Hatch	685	5.4	+5.4
Greens	Beryl Francis	626	5.0	−0.1
Independent	John Smith	216	1.7	−3.8
Total formal votes		12,584	96.8	+0.7
Informal votes		413	3.2	−0.7
Turnout		12,997	92.4	
Two-party-preferred result
Labor	David Templeman	6,856	54.9	+7.9
Liberal	Roger Nicholls	5,629	45.1	−7.9
Labor gain from Liberal		Swing	+7.9	

=== Maylands ===
2001 Western Australian state election: Maylands
Party	Candidate	Votes	%	±%
Labor	Judy Edwards	10,549	50.6	+3.6
Liberal	Bev Brennan	5,818	27.9	−9.4
Greens	Corinne Glenn	1,755	8.4	−0.6
One Nation	Bill Goulthorp	1,209	5.8	+5.8
Democrats	Michael Phillips-Ryder	813	3.9	−2.8
Independent	Troy Ellis	441	2.1	+2.1
	Neil Gray	259	1.2	+1.2
Total formal votes		20,844	94.3	−0.3
Informal votes		1,271	5.7	+0.3
Turnout		22,115	89.4	
Two-party-preferred result
Labor	Judy Edwards	13,391	64.5	+7.4
Liberal	Bev Brennan	7,378	35.5	−7.4
Labor hold		Swing	+7.4	

=== Merredin ===
2001 Western Australian state election: Merredin
Party	Candidate	Votes	%	±%
National	Hendy Cowan	6,339	56.4	−24.8
One Nation	John McKay	2,283	20.3	+20.3
Labor	Sharon Ivey	1,761	15.7	−3.1
Greens	Robert Jeffreys	341	3.0	+3.0
Independent	Don Cowan	307	2.7	+2.7
Curtin Labor Alliance	Callum Payne	204	1.8	+1.8
Total formal votes		11,235	96.2	−1.4
Informal votes		443	3.8	+1.4
Turnout		11,678	92.2	
Notional two-party-preferred count
National	Hendy Cowan	8,074	72.9	−8.3
Labor	Sharon Ivey	3,005	27.1	+8.3
Two-candidate-preferred result
National	Hendy Cowan	7,872	70.3	−10.9
One Nation	John McKay	3,326	29.7	+29.7
National hold		Swing	−10.9	

=== Midland ===
2001 Western Australian state election: Midland
Party	Candidate	Votes	%	±%
Labor	Michelle Roberts	10,874	47.8	+0.7
Liberal	Ian James	5,689	25.0	−14.8
One Nation	David Gunnyon	2,539	11.2	+11.2
Greens	Jane Bremmer	1,916	8.4	+8.4
Democrats	Peter Markham	793	3.5	−9.7
Independent	Kev Cusworth	421	1.9	+1.9
Independent	Peter Bucknell	204	0.9	+0.9
Independent	Charles Eadon-Clarke	177	0.8	+0.8
Curtin Labor Alliance	John Burt	142	0.6	+0.6
Total formal votes		22,755	94.4	−0.1
Informal votes		1,348	5.6	+0.1
Turnout		24,103	90.9	
Two-party-preferred result
Labor	Michelle Roberts	14,306	63.5	+9.2
Liberal	Ian James	8,219	36.5	−9.2
Labor hold		Swing	+9.2	

=== Mitchell ===
2001 Western Australian state election: Mitchell
Party	Candidate	Votes	%	±%
Liberal	Dan Sullivan	7,475	48.8	+0.6
Labor	Margaret Lane	4,537	29.6	−11.8
One Nation	Andy Konnecke	1,742	11.4	+11.4
Greens	Patsie Gubler	897	5.9	+0.4
Independent	Ross Slater	267	1.7	+1.7
Independent	Lyn Kearsley	224	1.5	+1.5
Democrats	Elizabeth Hellyer	185	1.2	−1.0
Total formal votes		15,327	96.7	+0.1
Informal votes		529	3.3	−0.1
Turnout		15,856	91.7	
Two-party-preferred result
Liberal	Dan Sullivan	8,866	58.2	+5.0
Labor	Margaret Lane	6,367	41.8	−5.0
Liberal hold		Swing	+5.0	

=== Moore ===
2001 Western Australian state election: Moore
Party	Candidate	Votes	%	±%
Liberal	Bill McNee	4,108	36.5	−41.4
One Nation	Stephen Peters	2,749	24.4	+24.4
Labor	Darren West	2,021	18.0	−4.1
National	Sue Metcalf	1,811	16.1	+16.1
Greens	Adrian Glamorgan	561	5.0	+5.0
Total formal votes		11,250	96.3	−1.1
Informal votes		431	3.7	+1.1
Turnout		11,681	93.2	
Notional two-party-preferred count
Liberal	Bill McNee	7,173	65.1	−12.8
Labor	Darren West	3,845	34.9	+12.8
Two-candidate-preferred result
Liberal	Bill McNee	7,033	62.9	−15.0
One Nation	Stephen Peters	4,148	37.1	+37.1
Liberal hold		Swing	−15.0	

=== Murdoch ===
2001 Western Australian state election: Murdoch
Party	Candidate	Votes	%	±%
Liberal	Mike Board	10,430	49.4	−10.6
Labor	Gavin Waugh	6,943	32.9	+6.1
Greens	Felicity McGeorge	2,308	10.9	−2.2
Democrats	Carole Pestana	1,442	6.8	+6.8
Total formal votes		21,123	96.4	+0.2
Informal votes		790	3.6	−0.2
Turnout		21,913	91.4	
Two-party-preferred result
Liberal	Mike Board	11,906	56.6	−8.5
Labor	Gavin Waugh	9,144	43.4	+8.5
Liberal hold		Swing	−8.5	

=== Murray-Wellington ===
2001 Western Australian state election: Murray-Wellington
Party	Candidate	Votes	%	±%
Liberal	John Bradshaw	4,690	36.8	−17.9
Labor	Patricia Briggs	3,826	30.0	0.0
One Nation	Joe Dacheff	2,656	20.8	+20.8
Independent	Ian Campbell	1,135	8.9	+8.9
Curtin Labor Alliance	Brian McCarthy	451	3.5	+1.9
Total formal votes		12,758	95.1	−0.2
Informal votes		658	4.9	+0.2
Turnout		13,416	92.8	
Two-party-preferred result
Liberal	John Bradshaw	6,695	53.0	−9.0
Labor	Patricia Briggs	5,926	47.0	+9.0
Liberal hold		Swing	−9.0	

=== Nedlands ===
2001 Western Australian state election: Nedlands
Party	Candidate	Votes	%	±%
Liberal	Richard Court	9,948	49.2	−7.4
Labor	Neil Roberts	3,856	19.1	−0.8
Liberals for Forests	Liz Davenport	3,688	18.2	+18.2
Greens	Elena Jeffreys	1,353	6.7	−4.4
Democrats	Ashley Buckle	656	3.2	−4.6
One Nation	Bill Edgar	546	2.7	+2.7
Independent	Doug Greypower	181	0.9	+0.9
Total formal votes		20,228	97.4	+0.1
Informal votes		530	2.6	−0.1
Turnout		20,758	88.1	
Notional two-party-preferred count
Liberal	Richard Court	12,134	60.2	−4.6
Labor	Neil Roberts	8,007	39.8	+4.6
Two-candidate-preferred result
Liberal	Richard Court	11,079	54.9	−10.0
Liberals for Forests	Liz Davenport	9,089	45.1	+45.1
Liberal hold		Swing	−10.0	

=== Ningaloo ===
2001 Western Australian state election: Ningaloo
Party	Candidate	Votes	%	±%
Liberal	Rod Sweetman	3,059	38.2	+2.2
Labor	Samantha Ogden	2,666	33.3	−8.3
One Nation	John Cope	1,263	15.8	+15.8
Independent	Lex Fullarton	517	6.5	+6.5
Greens	John Blinkhorn	396	4.9	−1.5
Democrats	Marcus Lindsay	103	1.3	−1.2
Total formal votes		8,004	96.5	+0.4
Informal votes		289	3.5	−0.4
Turnout		8,293	82.1	
Two-party-preferred result
Liberal	Rod Sweetman	4,157	52.4	+1.7
Labor	Samantha Ogden	3,781	47.6	−1.7
Liberal hold		Swing	+1.7	

=== Nollamara ===
2001 Western Australian state election: Nollamara
Party	Candidate	Votes	%	±%
Labor	John Kobelke	11,243	56.1	+2.2
Liberal	Aaron Gray	5,259	26.2	−10.7
One Nation	Keith Anderson	1,506	7.5	+7.5
Greens	Kayt Davies	1,140	5.7	+5.7
Democrats	Paul McCutcheon	581	2.9	−6.3
Independent	Hasan Demirkol	322	1.6	+1.6
Total formal votes		20,051	92.7	+0.2
Informal votes		1,577	7.3	−0.2
Turnout		21,628	90.5	
Two-party-preferred result
Labor	John Kobelke	13,385	67.3	+8.4
Liberal	Aaron Gray	6,512	32.7	−8.4
Labor hold		Swing	+8.4	

=== Peel ===
2001 Western Australian state election: Peel
Party	Candidate	Votes	%	±%
Labor	Norm Marlborough	14,509	52.8	−0.7
Liberal	John Wootton	5,962	21.7	+5.2
One Nation	Bill Holmes	3,480	12.7	+12.7
Greens	Jeff McGinniss	2,021	7.4	0.0
Democrats	Craig Wakeford	747	2.7	−2.4
Independent	Lynette Lowery-Small	354	1.3	+1.3
Curtin Labor Alliance	John Vickers	299	1.1	+1.1
	Alan Grafton	107	0.4	+0.4
Total formal votes		27,479	96.3	+1.4
Informal votes		1,049	3.7	−1.4
Turnout		28,528	91.0	
Two-party-preferred result
Labor	Norm Marlborough	17,984	66.5	+5.3
Liberal	John Wootton	9,040	33.5	−5.3
Labor hold		Swing	+5.3	

=== Perth ===
2001 Western Australian state election: Perth
Party	Candidate	Votes	%	±%
Labor	John Hyde	8,423	45.63	−1.33
Liberal	Peter Boyle	5,918	32.06	−5.01
Greens	Su Hsien-Lee	2,031	11.00	−0.53
Democrats	Paul Hubbard	819	4.44	+4.44
One Nation	John Hakesley	766	4.15	+4.15
votedave	Dave Chambers	303	1.64	+1.64
	Julius Re	103	0.56	+0.56
	Roberto Jorquera	99	0.53	+0.53
Total formal votes		18,461	94.07	−0.65
Informal votes		1,163	5.93	+0.65
Turnout		19,624	87.25	+0.94
Two-party-preferred result
Labor	John Hyde	11,263	61.26	+3.33
Liberal	Peter Boyle	7,123	38.74	−3.33
Labor hold		Swing	3.33	

=== Pilbara ===
2001 Western Australian state election: Pilbara
Party	Candidate	Votes	%	±%
Independent	Larry Graham	3,636	54.6	+54.6
Labor	Jackie Ormsby	1,782	26.8	−37.0
Liberal	Mark Liedel	821	12.4	−16.9
One Nation	Gavin Ness	416	6.3	+6.3
Total formal votes		6,645	95.6	+0.2
Informal votes		307	4.4	−0.2
Turnout		6,952	68.4	
Notional two-party-preferred count
Labor	Jackie Ormsby	3,692	56.0	−9.7
Liberal	Mark Liedel	2,903	44.0	+9.7
Two-candidate-preferred result
Independent	Larry Graham	4,571	69.2	+69.2
Labor	Jackie Ormsby	2,038	30.8	−34.9
Independent gain from Labor		Swing	+69.2	

=== Riverton ===
2001 Western Australian state election: Riverton
Party	Candidate	Votes	%	±%
Labor	Tony McRae	8,136	38.2	+10.0
Liberal	Graham Kierath	8,057	37.9	−8.7
Greens	Marilyn Ashton	1,669	7.8	+7.8
One Nation	Aida Konstek	1,189	5.6	+5.6
Independent	Anita Matsen	932	4.4	+4.4
Democrats	Jamie Bekkers	782	3.7	−1.5
Independent	Li Chen	517	2.4	+2.4
Total formal votes		21,282	96.4	+0.2
Informal votes		803	3.6	−0.2
Turnout		22,085	91.9	
Two-party-preferred result
Labor	Tony McRae	11,217	53.0	+9.7
Liberal	Graham Kierath	9,940	47.0	−9.7
Labor gain from Liberal		Swing	+9.7	

=== Rockingham ===
2001 Western Australian state election: Rockingham
Party	Candidate	Votes	%	±%
Labor	Mark McGowan	11,136	53.7	+5.2
Liberal	Jodie Payne	5,180	25.0	−9.9
One Nation	Max Fiannaca	2,486	12.0	+12.0
Greens	Monique Keel	1,219	5.9	−0.1
Democrats	Dean Richter	579	2.8	−1.3
Seniors	Gordon Heyes	140	0.7	+0.7
Total formal votes		20,740	95.3	−0.4
Informal votes		1,025	4.7	+0.4
Turnout		21,765	91.6	
Two-party-preferred result
Labor	Mark McGowan	13,471	65.6	+8.1
Liberal	Jodie Payne	7,061	34.4	−8.1
Labor hold		Swing	+8.1	

=== Roe ===
2001 Western Australian state election: Roe
Party	Candidate	Votes	%	±%
National	Ross Ainsworth	4,430	37.2	−16.3
One Nation	Bob Hodgkinson	2,553	21.5	+21.5
Liberal	Anthony Fels	2,524	21.2	+21.2
Labor	Steve Boni	1,931	16.2	+5.9
Curtin Labor Alliance	Steve Leeder	458	3.9	+3.9
Total formal votes		11,896	96.8	−0.8
Informal votes		387	3.2	+0.8
Turnout		12,283	91.3	
Notional two-party-preferred count
National	Ross Ainsworth	8,430	71.7	−11.1
Labor	Steve Boni	3,325	28.3	+11.1
Two-candidate-preferred result
National	Ross Ainsworth	8,189	69.2	+7.2
One Nation	Bob Hodgkinson	3,653	30.8	+30.8
National hold		Swing	+7.2	

=== Roleystone ===
2001 Western Australian state election: Roleystone
Party	Candidate	Votes	%	±%
Labor	Martin Whitely	8,759	38.5	+5.7
Liberal	Fred Tubby	7,385	32.4	−15.9
One Nation	Bill Cox	2,654	11.7	+11.7
Greens	Margo Beilby	2,109	9.3	−1.2
Democrats	Gaye Cranfield	772	3.4	−4.9
Christian Democrats	Craig Watson	738	3.2	+3.2
Seniors	Bill Love	363	1.6	+1.6
Total formal votes		22,780	95.1	+0.1
Informal votes		1,182	4.9	−0.1
Turnout		23,962	91.7	
Two-party-preferred result
Labor	Martin Whitely	12,374	54.9	+12.1
Liberal	Fred Tubby	10,176	45.1	−12.1
Labor gain from Liberal		Swing	+12.1	

=== South Perth ===
2001 Western Australian state election: South Perth
Party	Candidate	Votes	%	±%
Independent	Phillip Pendal	6,375	30.8	−8.8
Liberal	Andrew Murfin	6,251	30.2	−3.1
Labor	Daniel Smith	4,943	23.9	+4.1
Greens	Paul Smith	1,326	6.4	−0.8
Independent	Claire Allison	1,127	5.4	+5.4
Democrats	Mark Reynolds	676	3.3	+3.3
Total formal votes		20,698	97.2	−0.2
Informal votes		599	2.8	+0.2
Turnout		21,297	89.2	
Notional two-party-preferred count
Liberal	Andrew Murfin	12,520	60.9	−10.1
Labor	Daniel Smith	8,024	39.1	+10.1
Two-candidate-preferred result
Independent	Phillip Pendal	12,924	62.8	−1.4
Liberal	Andrew Murfin	7,671	37.2	+1.4
Independent hold		Swing	−1.4	

=== Southern River ===
2001 Western Australian state election: Southern River
Party	Candidate	Votes	%	±%
Labor	Paul Andrews	11,153	40.6	−0.2
Liberal	Monica Holmes	9,682	35.2	−8.4
One Nation	Peter Hopkins	2,562	9.3	+9.3
Greens	Luke Edmonds	1,413	5.1	+5.1
Christian Democrats	Michelle Shave	959	3.5	+0.1
Democrats	Dean Craig	678	2.5	−3.1
Seniors	Roger Davenport	576	2.1	+2.1
Independent	John Parker	467	1.7	+1.7
Total formal votes		27,490	95.0	−0.2
Informal votes		1,457	5.0	+0.2
Turnout		28,947	91.9	
Two-party-preferred result
Labor	Paul Andrews	14,563	53.4	+4.9
Liberal	Monica Holmes	12,718	46.6	−4.9
Labor gain from Liberal		Swing	+4.9	

=== Stirling ===
2001 Western Australian state election: Stirling
Party	Candidate	Votes	%	±%
National	Monty House	4,572	37.3	−29.4
Labor	Ian Bishop	2,244	18.3	+1.8
One Nation	Darius Crowe	2,182	17.8	+17.8
Independent	Ken Drummond	1,705	13.9	+13.9
Greens	Paul Llewellyn	1,542	12.6	−0.1
Total formal votes		12,245	96.8	+0.4
Informal votes		407	3.2	−0.4
Turnout		12,652	91.8	
Two-party-preferred result
National	Monty House	7,540	62.4	−11.7
Labor	Ian Bishop	4,537	37.6	+11.7
National hold		Swing	−11.7	

=== Swan Hills ===
2001 Western Australian state election: Swan Hills
Party	Candidate	Votes	%	±%
Liberal	June van de Klashorst	9,032	35.3	−15.9
Labor	Jaye Radisich	8,319	32.5	+5.4
Greens	Sharon Davies	3,048	11.9	+1.1
One Nation	Ian Whittaker	2,798	10.9	+10.9
Liberals for Forests	John Daw	1,422	5.6	+5.6
Democrats	Michael Barrett	967	3.8	−4.3
Total formal votes		25,586	95.9	−0.2
Informal votes		1,104	4.1	+0.2
Turnout		26,690	92.7	
Two-party-preferred result
Labor	Jaye Radisich	13,182	52.0	+11.7
Liberal	June van de Klashorst	12,145	48.0	−11.7
Labor gain from Liberal		Swing	+11.7	

=== Thornlie ===
2001 Western Australian state election: Thornlie
Party	Candidate	Votes	%	±%
Labor	Sheila McHale	10,268	48.2	+6.1
Liberal	Julie Brown	5,730	26.9	−16.2
One Nation	Kevin Koevort	2,305	10.8	+10.8
Greens	Tina McVicar	1,062	5.0	−2.6
Christian Democrats	Terry Ryan	876	4.1	+4.1
Democrats	Stephen Crabbe	636	3.0	−4.2
Independent	Anwar Sayed	441	2.1	+2.1
Total formal votes		21,318	94.5	−0.2
Informal votes		1,231	5.5	+0.2
Turnout		22,549	91.4	
Two-party-preferred result
Labor	Sheila McHale	12,740	60.4	+8.9
Liberal	Julie Brown	8,364	39.6	−8.9
Labor hold		Swing	+8.9	

=== Vasse ===
2001 Western Australian state election: Vasse
Party	Candidate	Votes	%	±%
Liberal	Bernie Masters	4,481	29.7	−13.5
Labor	Ross Bromell	3,619	24.0	+7.3
National	Beryle Morgan	3,481	23.1	−0.1
One Nation	Patricia Embry	1,856	12.3	+12.3
Greens	Bill Franssen	1,206	8.0	+8.0
Democrats	John Partridge	431	2.9	−0.7
Total formal votes		15,074	96.6	+0.2
Informal votes		535	3.4	−0.2
Turnout		15,609	92.4	
Two-party-preferred result
Liberal	Bernie Masters	8,302	55.5	−3.7
Labor	Ross Bromell	6,648	44.5	+44.5
Liberal hold		Swing	−14.2	

=== Victoria Park ===
2001 Western Australian state election: Victoria Park
Party	Candidate	Votes	%	±%
Labor	Geoff Gallop	10,833	51.9	+4.2
Liberal	Sandra Brown	5,612	26.9	−9.0
Greens	Juanita Miller	1,685	8.1	+1.8
One Nation	Peter David	1,417	6.8	+6.8
Democrats	Collin Mullane	825	4.0	−1.1
Curtin Labor Alliance	Andrew Fox	487	2.3	+2.3
Total formal votes		20,859	95.1	−0.4
Informal votes		1,078	4.9	+0.4
Turnout		21,937	88.5	
Two-party-preferred result
Labor	Geoff Gallop	13,236	63.8	+6.0
Liberal	Sandra Brown	7,503	36.2	−6.0
Labor hold		Swing	+6.0	

=== Wagin ===
2001 Western Australian state election: Wagin
Party	Candidate	Votes	%	±%
National	Terry Waldron	3,189	28.0	−46.3
Liberal	Judith Adams	2,951	25.9	+25.9
One Nation	Henk Meydam	2,237	19.6	+19.6
Labor	Allison Madson	1,758	15.4	−3.4
Curtin Labor Alliance	Jean Robinson	846	7.4	+0.4
Greens	Stewart Jackson	420	3.7	+3.7
Total formal votes		11,401	96.0	−0.6
Informal votes		472	4.0	+0.6
Turnout		11,873	93.7	
Notional two-party-preferred count
National	Terry Waldron	7,859	69.6	−9.2
Labor	Allison Madson	3,436	30.4	+9.2
Two-candidate-preferred result
National	Terry Waldron	6,299	55.9	−22.8
Liberal	Judith Adams	4,969	44.1	+44.1
National hold		Swing	−22.8	

=== Wanneroo ===
2001 Western Australian state election: Wanneroo
Party	Candidate	Votes	%	±%
Labor	Dianne Guise	14,126	42.9	+3.0
Liberal	Iain MacLean	11,352	34.4	−10.4
One Nation	Ron Holt	3,221	9.8	+9.8
Greens	Miguel Castillo	1,880	5.7	−2.3
Independent	Dave Fort	1,064	3.2	+3.2
Democrats	Patti Lock	974	3.0	−4.2
Seniors	Eric Couzens	344	1.0	+1.0
Total formal votes		32,961	94.4	−0.8
Informal votes		1,942	5.6	+0.8
Turnout		34,903	92.5	
Two-party-preferred result
Labor	Dianne Guise	18,266	55.9	+7.5
Liberal	Iain MacLean	14,408	44.1	−7.5
Labor gain from Liberal		Swing	+7.5	

=== Warren-Blackwood ===
2001 Western Australian state election: Warren-Blackwood
Party	Candidate	Votes	%	±%
Liberal	Paul Omodei	6,732	47.7	−14.1
Labor	Veronica Keating	2,338	16.6	−8.0
Greens	Peter Lane	1,853	13.1	+13.1
One Nation	Tony Drake	1,620	11.5	+11.5
Independent	Hayden Rice	1,210	8.6	+8.6
Liberals for Forests	Chris Davies	240	1.7	+1.7
Independent	Allan Martin	130	0.9	+0.9
Total formal votes		14,123	97.0	+0.4
Informal votes		443	3.0	−0.4
Turnout		14,566	92.5	
Two-party-preferred result
Liberal	Paul Omodei	8,955	64.4	−2.7
Labor	Veronica Keating	4,944	35.6	+2.7
Liberal hold		Swing	−2.7	

=== Willagee ===
2001 Western Australian state election: Willagee
Party	Candidate	Votes	%	±%
Labor	Alan Carpenter	10,878	52.7	+2.6
Liberal	Nerina Lewis	5,535	26.8	−9.9
Greens	Diannah Johnston	2,064	10.0	+1.3
One Nation	Warren Higgs	1,517	7.3	+7.3
Democrats	Florence Evans	662	3.2	−1.3
Total formal votes		20,656	95.2	0.0
Informal votes		1,046	4.8	0.0
Turnout		21,702	91.0	
Two-party-preferred result
Labor	Alan Carpenter	13,499	65.7	+6.9
Liberal	Nerina Lewis	7,032	34.3	−6.9
Labor hold		Swing	+6.9	

=== Yokine ===
2001 Western Australian state election: Yokine
Party	Candidate	Votes	%	±%
Labor	Bob Kucera	8,593	41.5	+4.3
Liberal	Kim Hames	7,927	38.2	−5.9
Greens	Heather Aquilina	1,759	8.5	+3.2
One Nation	James Ring	810	3.9	+3.9
Democrats	Aaron Hewett	756	3.6	−1.1
Independent	Ron Samuel	597	2.9	+2.9
Seniors	Penny Searle	287	1.4	+1.4
Total formal votes		20,729	95.2	+0.3
Informal votes		1,050	4.8	−0.3
Turnout		21,779	89.4	
Two-party-preferred result
Labor	Bob Kucera	11,008	53.4	+6.6
Liberal	Kim Hames	9,595	46.6	−6.6
Labor gain from Liberal		Swing	+6.6	

== See also ==
- Results of the Western Australian state election, 2001 (Legislative Council)
- 2001 Western Australian state election
- Candidates of the Western Australian state election, 2001
- Members of the Western Australian Legislative Assembly, 2001–2005
