= Electoral results for the district of Riverton =

Western Australian district election results

This is a list of electoral results for the electoral district of Riverton in Western Australian state elections.

== Members for Riverton ==
Member	Party	Term
Graham Kierath	Liberal	1989–2001
Tony McRae	Labor	2001–2008
Mike Nahan	Liberal	2008–2021
Jags Krishnan	Labor	2021–present

== Election results ==
=== Elections in the 2020s ===
2025 Western Australian state election: Riverton
Party	Candidate	Votes	%	±%
Labor	Jags Krishnan	12,005	43.2	−8.9
Liberal	Amanda Spencer-Teo	10,121	36.4	+3.7
Greens	Tim Hall	3,224	11.6	+4.2
Christians	Joan Lee Ng	1,551	5.6	+1.7
One Nation	Flint Adarne	893	3.2	+3.0
Total formal votes		27,794	96.9	−0.5
Informal votes		891	3.1	+0.5
Turnout		28,685	91.8	+4.2
Two-party-preferred result
Labor	Jags Krishnan	15,064	54.2	−6.6
Liberal	Amanda Spencer-Teo	12,714	45.8	+6.6
Labor hold		Swing	−6.6	

2021 Western Australian state election: Riverton
Party	Candidate	Votes	%	±%
Labor	Jags Krishnan	12,850	50.0	+16.1
Liberal	Anthony Spagnolo	8,928	34.7	−10.2
Greens	Simon Blackburn	1,989	7.7	−1.6
Christians	Dena Gower	955	3.7	−0.9
Liberal Democrats	Chris Holman	444	1.7	+1.7
Western Australia	Terry Lee	293	1.1	+0.0
No Mandatory Vaccination	Penelope Scull	242	0.9	+0.9
Total formal votes		25,701	97.4	+1.2
Informal votes		675	2.6	−1.2
Turnout		26,376	90.8	−0.6
Two-party-preferred result
Labor	Jags Krishnan	15,157	59.0	+13.2
Liberal	Anthony Spagnolo	10,537	41.0	−13.2
Labor gain from Liberal		Swing	+13.2	

=== Elections in the 2010s ===
2017 Western Australian state election: Riverton
Party	Candidate	Votes	%	±%
Liberal	Mike Nahan	10,047	45.2	−14.6
Labor	Marion Boswell	7,492	33.7	+1.8
Greens	Thor Kerr	2,090	9.4	+2.6
One Nation	Tshung-Hui Chang	1,086	4.9	+4.9
Christians	Susan Regnard	1,058	4.8	+4.8
Matheson for WA	Gavin Waugh	274	1.2	+1.2
Micro Business	Zeeshan Pasha	204	0.9	+0.9
Total formal votes		22,251	96.3	+2.0
Informal votes		850	3.7	−2.0
Turnout		23,101	91.0	−3.1
Two-party-preferred result
Liberal	Mike Nahan	12,092	54.4	−8.3
Labor	Marion Boswell	10,153	45.6	+8.3
Liberal hold		Swing	−8.3	

2013 Western Australian state election: Riverton
Party	Candidate	Votes	%	±%
Liberal	Mike Nahan	11,807	56.3	+13.6
Labor	Hannah Beazley	7,388	35.2	–3.2
Greens	Marcus Atkinson	1,291	6.2	–4.6
Independent	Joe Delle Donne	477	2.3	+2.3
Total formal votes		20,963	94.4	−0.8
Informal votes		1,237	5.6	+0.8
Turnout		22,200	92.2	
Two-party-preferred result
Liberal	Mike Nahan	12,405	59.2	+7.2
Labor	Hannah Beazley	8,553	40.8	–7.2
Liberal hold		Swing	+7.2	

=== Elections in the 2000s ===
2008 Western Australian state election: Riverton
Party	Candidate	Votes	%	±%
Liberal	Mike Nahan	8,002	41.3	+1.4
Labor	Tony McRae	7,722	39.9	−4.3
Greens	Sol Hanna	2,037	10.5	+4.6
Christian Democrats	Daniel Ossevoort	652	3.4	+0.4
Family First	Joy Drennan	548	2.8	+0.3
Independent	Christopher Boots	403	2.1	+2.1
Total formal votes		19,364	95.1	+0.3
Informal votes		1,004	4.9	−0.3
Turnout		20,368	89.6	
Two-party-preferred result
Liberal	Mike Nahan	9,708	50.2	+2.2
Labor	Tony McRae	9,644	49.8	−2.2
Liberal gain from Labor		Swing	+2.2	

2005 Western Australian state election: Riverton
Party	Candidate	Votes	%	±%
Labor	Tony McRae	10,825	43.9	+5.2
Liberal	Margaret Thomas	9,980	40.4	+2.9
Greens	Brad Pettitt	1,450	5.9	−2.0
Christian Democrats	Rajesh Vettoor	710	2.9	+2.5
Family First	Deborah Hudson	600	2.4	+2.4
Independent	Trish Fowler	595	2.4	+2.4
One Nation	Aida Konstek	263	1.1	−4.8
Independent	Choy Chan Ma	259	1.0	+1.0
Total formal votes		24,682	94.7	−1.7
Informal votes		1,370	5.3	+1.7
Turnout		26,052	92.3	
Two-party-preferred result
Labor	Tony McRae	12,757	51.7	−1.4
Liberal	Margaret Thomas	11,910	48.3	+1.4
Labor hold		Swing	−1.4	

2001 Western Australian state election: Riverton
Party	Candidate	Votes	%	±%
Labor	Tony McRae	8,136	38.2	+10.0
Liberal	Graham Kierath	8,057	37.9	−8.7
Greens	Marilyn Ashton	1,669	7.8	+7.8
One Nation	Aida Konstek	1,189	5.6	+5.6
Independent	Anita Matsen	932	4.4	+4.4
Democrats	Jamie Bekkers	782	3.7	−1.5
Independent	Li Chen	517	2.4	+2.4
Total formal votes		21,282	96.4	+0.2
Informal votes		803	3.6	−0.2
Turnout		22,085	91.9	
Two-party-preferred result
Labor	Tony McRae	11,217	53.0	+9.7
Liberal	Graham Kierath	9,940	47.0	−9.7
Labor gain from Liberal		Swing	+9.7	

=== Elections in the 1990s ===
1996 Western Australian state election: Riverton
Party	Candidate	Votes	%	±%
Liberal	Graham Kierath	9,686	46.6	−10.0
Labor	Jane van den Herik	5,847	28.2	−6.2
Independent	Margot Ross	3,583	17.3	+17.3
Democrats	Eric Speed	1,083	5.2	−0.2
Independent	Abraham Lynx	570	2.7	+2.7
Total formal votes		20,769	96.2	−0.6
Informal votes		823	3.8	+0.6
Turnout		21,592	91.6	
Two-party-preferred result
Liberal	Graham Kierath	11,746	56.7	−4.2
Labor	Jane van den Herik	8,957	43.3	+4.2
Liberal hold		Swing	−4.2	

1993 Western Australian state election: Riverton
Party	Candidate	Votes	%	±%
Liberal	Graham Kierath	10,442	56.0	+7.5
Labor	Dean Ellis	6,342	34.0	−4.5
Greens	Sally Boteler	1,212	6.5	+6.5
Democrats	Donald Bryant	661	3.5	−0.9
Total formal votes		18,657	96.6	+3.5
Informal votes		661	3.4	−3.5
Turnout		19,318	94.2	+2.0
Two-party-preferred result
Liberal	Graham Kierath	11,284	60.5	+6.0
Labor	Dean Ellis	7,373	39.5	−6.0
Liberal hold		Swing	+6.0	

=== Elections in the 1980s ===
1989 Western Australian state election: Riverton
Party	Candidate	Votes	%	±%
Liberal	Graham Kierath	8,452	48.5	+1.3
Labor	Marilyn Crispin	6,702	38.5	−12.3
Independent	Eelco Tacoma	1,007	5.8	+5.8
Democrats	Neil Worrall	768	4.4	+4.4
Independent	Michael Smith	493	2.8	+2.8
Total formal votes		17,422	93.1	
Informal votes		1,293	6.9	
Turnout		18,715	92.2	
Two-party-preferred result
Liberal	Graham Kierath	9,496	54.5	+6.3
Labor	Marilyn Crispin	7,926	45.5	−6.3
Liberal gain from Labor		Swing	+6.3	
