= Electoral results for the district of Alfred Cove =

Western Australian district election results

This is a list of electoral results for the electoral district of Alfred Cove in Western Australian state elections.

== Members for Alfred Cove ==
Member	Party	Term
Doug Shave	Liberal	1996–2001
Janet Woollard	Liberals for Forests	2001–2008
Janet Woollard	Independent Liberal	2008–2013
Dean Nalder	Liberal	2013–2017

== Election results ==
=== Elections in the 2010s ===
2013 Western Australian state election: Alfred Cove
Party	Candidate	Votes	%	±%
Liberal	Dean Nalder	13,523	64.4	+19.4
Labor	David Houston	3,532	16.8	–3.2
Independent Liberal	Janet Woollard	2,114	10.1	–13.3
Greens	Ros Harman	1,665	7.9	–2.0
	Estelle Gom	161	0.8	+0.8
Total formal votes		20,995	95.2	–0.7
Informal votes		1,047	4.8	+0.7
Turnout		22,042	91.4	
Two-party-preferred result
Liberal	Dean Nalder	15,445	73.6	+23.8
Labor	David Houston	5,544	26.4	+26.4
Liberal gain from Independent Liberal		Swing	N/A	

=== Elections in the 2000s ===
2008 Western Australian state election: Alfred Cove
Party	Candidate	Votes	%	±%
Liberal	Chris Back	8,628	43.14	+5.20
Independent Liberal	Janet Woollard	5,094	25.47	+1.51
Labor	Catherine Barratt	4,059	20.29	−2.55
Greens	Michael Bennett	1,907	9.53	+3.17
Christian Democrats	Stephen Wardell-Johnson	314	1.57	−0.54
Total formal votes		20,002	95.96	−0.54
Informal votes		843	4.04	+0.54
Turnout		20,845	88.38	−3.47
Two-candidate-preferred result
Independent Liberal	Janet Woollard	10,200	51.01	−3.56
Liberal	Chris Back	9,795	48.99	+3.56
Independent Liberal hold		Swing	−3.56	

2005 Western Australian state election: Alfred Cove
Party	Candidate	Votes	%	±%
Liberal	Graham Kierath	9,424	37.9	+4.1
Liberals for Forests	Janet Woollard	5,952	24.0	+5.7
Labor	Michael Kane	5,675	22.8	+19.0
Independent	Katherine Jackson	1,686	6.8	+6.8
Greens	Scott Ryan	1,580	6.4	−0.6
Christian Democrats	William Suseno	525	2.1	+0.5
Total formal votes		24,842	96.5	−0.1
Informal votes		902	3.5	+0.1
Turnout		25,744	91.9	
Two-candidate-preferred result
Liberals for Forests	Janet Woollard	13,546	54.6	−3.6
Liberal	Graham Kierath	11,278	45.4	+3.6
Liberals for Forests hold		Swing	−3.6	

2001 Western Australian state election: Alfred Cove
Party	Candidate	Votes	%	±%
Liberal	Doug Shave	7,150	32.8	−17.1
Liberals for Forests	Janet Woollard	4,425	20.3	+20.3
Independent	Denise Brailey	4,390	20.1	+20.1
Greens	Elizabeth Peak	1,471	6.7	+6.7
Independent	Pam Neesham	1,222	5.6	+5.6
One Nation	Terry Corbett	1,177	5.4	+5.4
Independent	John Grayden	958	4.4	+4.4
Democrats	Jamie Paterson	618	2.8	+2.8
Christian Democrats	Amanda-Sue Markham	388	1.8	+1.8
Total formal votes		21,799	96.6	−0.8
Informal votes		758	3.4	+0.8
Turnout		22,557	91.8	
Two-candidate-preferred result
Liberals for Forests	Janet Woollard	12,396	57.4	+57.4
Liberal	Doug Shave	9,210	42.6	−9.8
Liberals for Forests gain from Liberal		Swing	+57.4	

=== Elections in the 1990s ===
1996 Western Australian state election: Alfred Cove
Party	Candidate	Votes	%	±%
Liberal	Doug Shave	10,657	49.9	−15.6
Independent	Penny Hearne	5,756	27.0	+27.0
Labor	Louise Pratt	4,134	19.4	−3.9
Independent	Lyn Edwards	802	3.8	+3.8
Total formal votes		21,349	97.4	+0.7
Informal votes		569	2.6	−0.7
Turnout		21,918	91.0	
Two-candidate-preferred result
Liberal	Doug Shave	11,182	52.4	−18.7
Independent	Penny Hearne	10,148	47.6	+47.6
Liberal hold		Swing	−18.7	
