= Electoral results for the district of Wagin =

Western Australian district election results

This is a list of electoral results for the electoral district of Wagin in Western Australian state elections.

== Members for Wagin ==
Wagin (1911–1950)
Member	Party	Term
Sydney Stubbs	Liberal (WA)	1911–1917
Sydney Stubbs	Country	1917–1923
Sydney Stubbs	Country (MCP)	1923–1924
Sydney Stubbs	Nationalist	1924–1927
Sydney Stubbs	Country	1927–1947
Crawford Nalder	Country	1947–1950
Wagin (1989–2017)
Member	Party	Term
Bob Wiese	National	1989–2001
Terry Waldron	National	2001–2017

== Election results ==
=== Elections in the 2010s ===
2013 Western Australian state election: Wagin
Party	Candidate	Votes	%	±%
National	Terry Waldron	12,108	63.7	+0.4
Liberal	Phillip Blight	3,316	17.4	+0.3
Labor	Josh Stokes	2,122	11.2	+0.4
Greens	Shirley Collins	849	4.5	+0.7
Christians	Jacky Young	620	3.3	–0.6
Total formal votes		19,015	95.6	–1.1
Informal votes		869	4.4	+1.1
Turnout		19,884	90.7	
Two-party-preferred result
Liberal	Phillip Blight	14,408	75.8	+0.9
Labor	Josh Stokes	4,588	24.2	–0.9
Two-candidate-preferred result
National	Terry Waldron	14,623	76.9	–1.5
Liberal	Phillip Blight	4,390	23.1	+1.5
National hold		Swing	–1.5	

=== Elections in the 2000s ===
2008 Western Australian state election: Wagin
Party	Candidate	Votes	%	±%
National	Terry Waldron	11,155	63.0	−1.0
Liberal	Steve Martin	3,254	18.4	+9.8
Labor	Douglas Melville	1,839	10.4	−4.2
Christian Democrats	Jacky Young	677	3.8	+0.4
Greens	Adrian Price	615	3.5	−0.1
Citizens Electoral Council	Jean Robinson	163	0.9	−0.7
Total formal votes		17,703	96.8	+1.1
Informal votes		593	3.2	−1.1
Turnout		18,296	89.8	
Two-candidate-preferred result
National	Terry Waldron	13,640	77.1	−2.6
Liberal	Steve Martin	4,045	22.9	+22.9
National hold		Swing	−2.6	

2005 Western Australian state election: Wagin
Party	Candidate	Votes	%	±%
National	Terry Waldron	8,137	69.0	+41.8
Labor	David Michael	1,915	16.2	+0.6
Greens	Paul Davis	541	4.6	+0.3
Christian Democrats	Peter Faulkner	473	4.0	+4.0
One Nation	Agnes Goedhart	463	3.9	−15.0
Citizens Electoral Council	Arthur Harvey	258	2.2	+2.2
Total formal votes		11,787	95.2	−0.7
Informal votes		593	4.8	+0.7
Turnout		12,380	91.5	
Two-party-preferred result
National	Terry Waldron	9,222	78.4	+9.4
Labor	David Michael	2,546	21.6	−9.4
National hold		Swing	+9.4	

2001 Western Australian state election: Wagin
Party	Candidate	Votes	%	±%
National	Terry Waldron	3,189	28.0	−46.3
Liberal	Judith Adams	2,951	25.9	+25.9
One Nation	Henk Meydam	2,237	19.6	+19.6
Labor	Allison Madson	1,758	15.4	−3.4
Curtin Labor Alliance	Jean Robinson	846	7.4	+0.4
Greens	Stewart Jackson	420	3.7	+3.7
Total formal votes		11,401	96.0	−0.6
Informal votes		472	4.0	+0.6
Turnout		11,873	93.7	
Two-party-preferred result
National	Terry Waldron	7,859	69.6	−9.2
Labor	Allison Madson	3,436	30.4	+9.2
Two-candidate-preferred result
National	Terry Waldron	6,299	55.9	−22.8
Liberal	Judith Adams	4,969	44.1	+44.1
National hold		Swing	−22.8	

=== Elections in the 1990s ===
1996 Western Australian state election: Wagin
Party	Candidate	Votes	%	±%
National	Bob Wiese	8,749	74.3	−1.3
Labor	Phil Hogan	2,213	18.8	+17.7
Citizens Electoral Council	Jean Robinson	819	7.0	+7.0
Total formal votes		11,781	96.6	+0.5
Informal votes		412	3.4	−0.5
Turnout		12,193	92.0	
Two-party-preferred result
National	Bob Wiese	9,270	78.7	+0.5
Labor	Phil Hogan	2,504	21.3	−0.5
National hold		Swing	+0.5	

1993 Western Australian state election: Wagin
Party	Candidate	Votes	%	±%
National	Bob Wiese	8,251	77.7	+26.4
Liberal	Kelly Newton-Wordsworth	2,361	22.3	−7.0
Total formal votes		10,612	95.8	+1.8
Informal votes		461	4.2	−1.8
Turnout		11,073	94.3	+1.3
National hold		Swing	+9.6	

=== Elections in the 1980s ===
1989 Western Australian state election: Wagin
Party	Candidate	Votes	%	±%
National	Bob Wiese	5,346	51.3	+11.1
Liberal	John Chamberlain	3,049	29.3	−10.8
Labor	David Whitney	2,024	19.4	−0.2
Total formal votes		10,419	94.0	
Informal votes		659	6.0	
Turnout		11,078	93.0	
Two-candidate-preferred result
National	Bob Wiese	7,094	68.1	+11.2
Liberal	John Chamberlain	3,325	31.9	−11.2
National hold		Swing	+11.2	

=== Elections in the 1940s ===
1947 Western Australian state election: Wagin
Party	Candidate	Votes	%	±%
Country	Crawford Nalder	928	26.6	+26.6
Labor	Eric Kealley	882	25.3	+0.8
Country	Archibald Irving	851	24.4	+24.4
Country	Gerald Piesse	830	23.8	+1.5
Total formal votes		3,491	97.3	−0.7
Informal votes		96	2.7	+0.7
Turnout		3,587	86.0	−0.9
Two-candidate-preferred result
Country	Crawford Nalder	1,953	55.9	+55.9
Country	Archibald Irving	1,538	44.1	+44.1
Country hold		Swing	N/A	

1943 Western Australian state election: Wagin
Party	Candidate	Votes	%	±%
Country	Sydney Stubbs	1,435	42.7	−23.9
Labor	Patrick Moore	822	24.5	+24.5
Country	Gerald Piesse	750	22.3	+22.3
Country	Alistair Wills-Johnson	353	10.5	+10.5
Total formal votes		3,360	98.0	−0.6
Informal votes		67	2.0	+0.6
Turnout		3,427	86.9	−4.1
Two-party-preferred result
Country	Sydney Stubbs	2,286	68.0	
Labor	Patrick Moore	1,074	32.0	
Country hold		Swing	N/A	

=== Elections in the 1930s ===
1939 Western Australian state election: Wagin
Party	Candidate	Votes	%	±%
Country	Sydney Stubbs	2,489	66.6	−34.4
Independent	Jack Eckersley	921	24.7	+24.7
Independent	Alfred Fisher	194	5.2	+5.2
Independent Country	Eugene Smalpage	132	3.5	+3.5
Total formal votes		3,736	98.6	
Informal votes		52	1.4	
Turnout		3,788	91.0	
Country hold		Swing	N/A	

1936 Western Australian state election: Wagin
Party	Candidate	Votes	%	±%
Country	Sydney Stubbs	unopposed		
Country hold		Swing		

1933 Western Australian state election: Wagin
Party	Candidate	Votes	%	±%
Country	Sydney Stubbs	unopposed		
Country hold		Swing		

1930 Western Australian state election: Wagin
Party	Candidate	Votes	%	±%
Country	Sydney Stubbs	2,070	61.8	
Country	Adam Elder	1,281	38.2	
Total formal votes		3,351	99.4	
Informal votes		21	0.6	
Turnout		3,372	72.8	
Country hold		Swing		

=== Elections in the 1920s ===
1927 Western Australian state election: Wagin
Party	Candidate	Votes	%	±%
Nationalist	Sydney Stubbs	1,432	59.2	−4.9
Country	Adam Elder	689	28.5	−7.4
Country	Phillip Toll	296	12.3	+12.3
Total formal votes		2,417	98.7	−0.5
Informal votes		31	1.3	+0.5
Turnout		2,448	75.8	+14.5
Nationalist hold		Swing	N/A	

1924 Western Australian state election: Wagin
Party	Candidate	Votes	%	±%
Country	Sydney Stubbs	1,110	64.1	−3.5
Executive Country	Norman Harvey	621	35.9	+35.9
Total formal votes		1,731	99.2	+0.3
Informal votes		13	0.8	−0.3
Turnout		1,744	61.3	+3.2
Country hold		Swing	N/A	

1921 Western Australian state election: Wagin
Party	Candidate	Votes	%	±%
Country	Sydney Stubbs	990	67.6	+16.0
Country	John Gettingby	474	32.4	+32.4
Informal votes		1,464	99.5	+0.5
Informal votes		7	0.5	−0.5
Turnout		1,471	58.1	−11.8
Country hold		Swing	N/A	

=== Elections in the 1910s ===
1917 Western Australian state election: Wagin
Party	Candidate	Votes	%	±%
National Country	Sydney Stubbs	995	51.6	–1.5
National Country	Ernest Absolon	808	41.9	–5.1
National Country	Charles Keyser	125	6.5	+6.5
Total formal votes		1,928	99.0	–0.4
Informal votes		20	1.0	+0.4
Turnout		1,948	69.9	+3.3
National Country hold		Swing	N/A	

1914 Western Australian state election: Wagin
Party	Candidate	Votes	%	±%
Liberal	Sydney Stubbs	1,071	53.0	−15.7
Country	Ernest Absolon	948	47.0	+47.0
Total formal votes		2,019	99.4	+1.0
Informal votes		12	0.6	−1.0
Turnout		2,031	66.6	−6.7
Liberal hold		Swing	N/A	

1911 Western Australian state election: Wagin
Party	Candidate	Votes	%	±%
Ministerialist	Sydney Stubbs	1,042	68.7	
Labor	Julius Nenke	474	31.3	
Total formal votes		1,516	98.4	
Informal votes		25	1.6	
Turnout		1,541	73.3	
Ministerialist hold		Swing		
