= Electoral results for the district of Narrogin =

Western Australian district election results

This is a list of electoral results for the Electoral district of Narrogin in Western Australian state elections.

== Members for Narrogin ==
Member	Party	Term
Victor Doney	Country	1950–1956
William Manning	Country	1956–1974
Peter Jones	Country	1974–1975
Peter Jones	National Country	1975–1985
Peter Jones	Liberal	1985–1986
Cambell Nalder	National	1986–1987
Bob Wiese	National	1987–1989

== Election results ==
=== Elections in the 1980s ===
1987 Narrogin state by-election
Party	Candidate	Votes	%	±%
National	Bob Wiese	3,854	49.8	+6.8
Liberal	Brian Page	2,675	34.5	−4.2
Labor	Lorna Long	1,213	15.7	−2.7
Total formal votes		7,742	98.9	+0.5
Informal votes		86	1.1	−0.5
Turnout		7,828	86.0	−8.2
Two-candidate-preferred result
National	Bob Wiese	4,656	60.1	+1.0
Liberal	Brian Page	3,086	39.9	−1.0
National hold		Swing	+1.0	

1986 Western Australian state election: Narrogin
Party	Candidate	Votes	%	±%
National	Cambell Nalder	3,690	43.0	−57.0
Liberal	Peter Jones	3,319	38.7	+38.7
Labor	Wayne White	1,576	18.4	+18.4
Total formal votes		8,585	98.4	
Informal votes		138	1.6	
Turnout		8,723	94.2	
Two-candidate-preferred result
National	Cambell Nalder	5,071	59.1	−40.9
Liberal	Peter Jones	3,514	40.9	+40.9
National hold		Swing	−40.9	

1983 Western Australian state election: Narrogin
Party	Candidate	Votes	%	±%
National Country	Peter Jones	unopposed		
National Country hold		Swing		

1980 Western Australian state election: Narrogin
Party	Candidate	Votes	%	±%
National Country	Peter Jones	5,397	77.0	−1.8
Labor	Malcolm Turner	1,614	23.0	+23.0
Total formal votes		7,011	98.1	+2.7
Informal votes		136	1.9	−2.7
Turnout		7,147	92.0	−1.6
National Country hold		Swing	N/A	

=== Elections in the 1970s ===
1977 Western Australian state election: Narrogin
Party	Candidate	Votes	%	±%
National Country	Peter Jones	5,510	78.8	
Liberal	Francesco Buemi	1,479	21.2	
Total formal votes		6,989	95.4	
Informal votes		337	4.6	
Turnout		7,326	93.6	
National Country hold		Swing	N/A	

1974 Western Australian state election: Narrogin
Party	Candidate	Votes	%	±%
National Alliance	Peter Jones	3,593	50.9	
Liberal	Robert Farr	1,978	28.0	
Labor	Gordon Appleton	1,492	21.1	
Total formal votes		7,063	98.1	
Informal votes		140	1.9	
Turnout		7,203	92.4	
Two-party-preferred result
National Alliance	Peter Jones	4,936	69.9	
Labor	Gordon Appleton	2,127	30.1	
National Alliance hold		Swing		

- Preferences were not distributed between the National Alliance and Liberal candidates for Narrogin.

1971 Western Australian state election: Narrogin
Party	Candidate	Votes	%	±%
Country	William Manning	1,919	33.0	−67.0
Labor	Malcolm Turner	1,856	31.9	+31.9
Liberal	Harry Pennington	1,212	20.8	+20.8
United Farmers	Malcolm McNaughton	540	9.3	+9.3
Democratic Labor	Terry Stevenson	286	4.9	+4.9
Total formal votes		5,813	94.8	
Informal votes		316	5.2	
Turnout		6,129	94.0	
Two-party-preferred result
Country	William Manning	3,357	57.7	−42.3
Labor	Malcolm Turner	2,456	42.3	+42.3
Country hold		Swing	N/A	

=== Elections in the 1960s ===
1968 Western Australian state election: Narrogin
Party	Candidate	Votes	%	±%
Country	William Manning	unopposed		
Country hold		Swing		

1965 Western Australian state election: Narrogin
Party	Candidate	Votes	%	±%
Country	William Manning	3,958	80.5	−19.5
Independent	Percy Munday	957	19.5	+19.5
Total formal votes		4,915	96.4	
Informal votes		184	3.6	
Turnout		5,099	93.3	
Country hold		Swing		

1962 Western Australian state election: Narrogin
Party	Candidate	Votes	%	±%
Country	William Manning	unopposed		
Country hold		Swing		

1959 Western Australian state election: Narrogin
Party	Candidate	Votes	%	±%
Country	William Manning	3,750	72.3	+50.9
Labor	Percy Munday	1,434	27.7	−1.1
Total formal votes		5,184	98.8	+0.7
Informal votes		61	1.2	−0.7
Turnout		5,245	93.2	+0.1
Country hold		Swing	+6.8	

1956 Western Australian state election: Narrogin
Party	Candidate	Votes	%	±%
Labor	Percy Munday	1,412	28.8	
Country	Bill Robinson	1,049	21.4	
Country	William Manning	1,047	21.4	
Liberal and Country	Robert Farr	1,017	20.8	
Country	Frank Ashworth	373	7.6	
Total formal votes		4,898	98.1	
Informal votes		93	1.9	
Turnout		4,991	93.1	
Two-party-preferred result
Country	William Manning	3,209	65.5	
Labor	Percy Munday	1,689	34.5	
Country hold		Swing		

1953 Western Australian state election: Narrogin
Party	Candidate	Votes	%	±%
Country	Victor Doney	unopposed		
Country hold		Swing		

1950 Western Australian state election: Narrogin
Party	Candidate	Votes	%	±%
Country	Victor Doney	unopposed		
Country hold		Swing		
