= Results of the 2001 Western Australian state election (Legislative Council) =

2001 Western Australian state election (Legislative Council)
- 10 February 2001

All 34 seats in the Legislative Council 17 seats needed for a majority

	First party	Second party	Third party
		L/NP
Leader	Kim Chance	Norman Moore	None
Party	Labor	Coalition	Greens
Leader's seat	Agricultural	Mining and Pastoral	—
Seats before	12	17	3
Seats won	13	13	5
Seat change	▲1	▼4	▲2
Popular vote	397,846	381,330	83,883
Percentage	37.94%	36.36%	8.00%
Swing	▲6.88pp	▼10.06pp	▲2.45pp
	Fourth party	Fifth party
	PHON	DEM
Leader	John Fischer	None
Party	One Nation	Democrats
Leader's seat	Mining and Pastoral (won seat)	—
Seats before	0	2
Seats won	3	0
Seat change	▲3	▼2
Popular vote	103,571	38,968
Percentage	9.88%	3.72%
Swing	▲9.88pp	▼2.86pp

This is a list of electoral region results for the Western Australian Legislative Council in the 2001 Western Australian state election.

== Results by electoral region ==
=== Agricultural ===
2001 Western Australian state election: Agricultural
Party	Candidate	Votes	%	±%
Quota		13,591		
Liberal	1. Bruce Donaldson (elected 1); 2. Murray Nixon; 3. Stuart Adams; 4. Brian Reading; 5. Margaret Rowe	24,484	30.0	
One Nation	1. Frank Hough (elected 2); 2. Ron McLean; 3. Leonard Hamersley	17,934	22.0	+22.0
Labor	1. Kim Chance (elected 3); 2. Dale Piercey; 3. Kelly Shay; 4. Cathryn Backer	16,486	20.2	−2.5
National	1. Murray Criddle (elected 4); 2. Dexter Davies; 3. Geoff Gill; 4. Chris Nelson; 5. Allan Marshall; 6. Gavin Davis	15,373	18.9	
Greens	1. Dee Margetts (elected 5); 2. Kate Davis	3,698	4.5	+4.5
Curtin Labor Alliance	1. A E Harvey; 2. Malcolm Talbot	1,940	2.4	+2.4
Democrats	1. Marilyn Rock; 2. Malcolm McKercher	1,508	1.9	−4.8
Independent	Ramon Kennedy	118	0.1	+0.1
Total formal votes		81,541	97.5	+0.8
Informal votes		2,094	2.5	−0.8
Turnout		83,635	92.0	+0.9

- The Liberal and National parties ran a joint ticket in 1996. The overall swing against the coalition for this region is -19.6.

=== East Metropolitan ===
2001 Western Australian state election: East Metropolitan
Party	Candidate	Votes	%	±%
Quota		39,831		
Labor	1. Nick Griffiths (elected 1); 2. Ljiljanna Ravlich (elected 3); 3. Louise Pratt (elected 4); 4. John Carruthers; 5. Brad George; 6. Emiliano Barzotto	105,596	44.2	+8.1
Liberal	1. Peter Foss (elected 2); 2. Derrick Tomlinson (elected 5); 3. Bill Munro; 4. Deborah Hopper; 5. Ken Shephard	72,378	30.3	−10.2
One Nation	1. Robin Scott; 2. Marye Daniels	23,986	10.0	+10.0
Greens	1. Lee Bell; 2. Alison Xamon	15,379	6.4	+1.0
Democrats	1. Norm Kelly; 2. Julie Ward	9,754	4.1	−2.7
Christian Democrats	1. Gerard Goiran; 2. Derk Gans	6,616	2.8	+0.4
Curtin Labor Alliance	1. Megan Kirwan; 2. Simon Makin	2,605	1.1	+1.1
Independent	Joan Torr	1,779	0.7	+0.7
Independent	John Tucak	358	0.2	+0.2
Independent	Tom Hoyer	339	0.1	+0.1
Independent	1. Alan Bateson; 2. Linda Bateson	193	0.1	+0.1
Total formal votes		238,983	97.1	+0.4
Informal votes		7,088	2.9	−0.4
Turnout		246,071	92.0	+0.4

=== Mining and Pastoral ===
2001 Western Australian state election: Mining and Pastoral
Party	Candidate	Votes	%	±%
Quota		8,691		
Labor	1. Tom Stephens (elected 1); 2. Jon Ford (elected 3); 3. Kevin Leahy; 4. Liz Tassell; 5. Margaret Vincent; 6. Mike Anderton	20,596	39.5	−8.5
Liberal	1. Norman Moore (elected 2); 2. Greg Smith; 3. Isabelle Scott; 4. Ken Baston; 5. John Fawcett	13,908	26.7	−9.0
One Nation	1. John Fischer (elected 4); 2. Wayne Trembath; 3. Irene Wybom	7,247	13.9	+13.9
Independent	1. Mark Nevill; 2. Randy Spargo; 3. Janeneil Sibosado	4,878	9.4	+9.4
Greens	1. Robin Chapple (elected 5); 2. Scott Ludlam	2,305	4.4	+4.4
National	1. Dudley Maslen; 2. Paul Ausburn; 3. Peter Kneebone	1,361	2.6	−7.1
Democrats	1. Don Hoddy; 2. Pam Heald	834	1.6	−3.4
Independent	1. Tom Helm; 2. Diane Mills	813	1.6	+1.6
Independent	Vin Cooper	140	0.3	+0.3
Independent	Murray Kennedy	62	0.1	+0.1
Total formal votes		52,144	97.6	+0.3
Informal votes		1,298	2.4	−0.3
Turnout		53,442	79.9	+1.3

=== North Metropolitan ===
2001 Western Australian state election: North Metropolitan
Party	Candidate	Votes	%	±%
Quota		39,829		
Liberal	1. George Cash (elected 1); 2. Ray Halligan (elected 3); 3. Alan Cadby (elected 5); 4. Peter Collier; 5. Michael Sutherland; 6. Andre Shannon; 7. Alan Carstairs	122,217	38.4	−8.0
Labor	1. Ed Dermer (elected 2); 2. Ken Travers (elected 4); 3. Graham Giffard (elected 7); 4. Batong Pham; 5. Roslyn Harley; 6. Andrew Waddell	118,027	37.0	+6.1
Greens	1. Giz Watson (elected 6); 2. Cameron Poustie; 3. Brenda Roy	31,031	9.7	+3.3
One Nation	1. Gerry Kenworthy; 2. Leeann Hopkins	19,403	6.1	+6.1
Democrats	1. Helen Hodgson; 2. Tim Law	13,690	4.3	−3.4
Christian Democrats	1. Dwight Randall; 2. Brian Peachey	7,698	2.4	+2.4
Independent	1. Ismail Fredericks; 2. Sam Basri	3,539	1.1	+1.1
Independent	David Berry	1,491	0.5	+0.5
Curtin Labor Alliance	1. Michael Whiteside; 2. Ismail Julius	910	0.3	+0.3
Seniors	Audrey Anderson	414	0.1	+0.1
Independent	Bronislaw Tabaczynski	207	0.1	+0.1
Total formal votes		318,627	97.4	+0.3
Informal votes		8,426	2.6	−0.3
Turnout		327,053	90.7	+0.5

=== South Metropolitan ===
2001 Western Australian state election: South Metropolitan
Party	Candidate	Votes	%	±%
Quota		37,068		
Labor	1. Sue Ellery (elected 1); 2. Kate Doust (elected 3); 3. Sylvia Mortas; 4. Liam Costello; 5. Kim Young; 6. Chilip Foo	95,625	43.0	+6.9
Liberal	1. Barbara Scott (elected 2); 2. Simon O'Brien (elected 4); 3. Alison Gibson; 4. Barry Pound; 5. Margaret Thomas	75,277	33.8	−7.5
Greens	1. Jim Scott (elected 5); 2. Lynn MacLaren	20,028	9.0	+2.1
One Nation	1. Tony Dines; 2. Sandra Rawlings	15,849	7.1	+7.1
Democrats	1. Jakica Zaknic; 2. Pam Townshend	10,952	4.9	−1.6
Curtin Labor Alliance	1. Adrian Bennett; 2. June Bennett	2,890	1.3	+1.3
Independent	Eddie Hwang	885	0.4	+0.4
Independent	Lawrence Shave	566	0.3	+0.3
Seniors	Pet van de Zuidwind	222	0.1	+0.1
Independent	Rick Finney	109	0.1	+0.1
Total formal votes		222,403	97.4	+0.3
Informal votes		5,910	2.6	−0.3
Turnout		228,313	90.9	+0.5

=== South West ===
2001 Western Australian state election: South West
Party	Candidate	Votes	%	±%
Quota		16,882		
Liberal	1. Barry House (elected 1); 2. Bill Stretch (elected 4); 3. Robyn McSweeney (elected 6); 4. John Silcock; 5. Nigel Hallett; 6. Robert Nicholson; 7. Craig Carbone	47,862	35.4	
Labor	1. John Cowdell (elected 2); 2. Adele Farina (elected 5); 3. Matt Benson-Lidholm; 4. Ursula Richards; 5. Patricia Creevey; 6. Garry Newman	41,516	30.7	+2.6
One Nation	1. Paddy Embry (elected 3); 2. Peter O'Reilly; 3. Judith South	19,152	14.2	+14.2
Greens	1. Chrissy Sharp (elected 7); 2. Basil Schur; 3. Judy Trembath	11,442	8.5	+1.0
National	1. Mal Cameron; 2. Steve Dilley; 3. Gordon Smith	8,339	6.2	
Democrats	1. Alf Denman; 2. Alison Wylie	2,361	1.7	−2.7
Christian Democrats	Justin Moseley	1,791	1.3	+1.3
Independent	Ken Gunson	1,633	1.2	+1.2
Curtin Labor Alliance	Terry Iturbide	640	0.5	+0.5
Seniors	Glen Wood	318	0.2	+0.2
Total formal votes		135,054	97.4	+0.4
Informal votes		3,618	2.6	−0.4
Turnout		138,672	92.1	+0.2

- The Liberal and National parties ran a joint ticket for South West in the 1996 election. The overall swing against the Coalition in the South West region was -10.8.

== See also ==
- Results of the Western Australian state election, 2001 (Legislative Assembly A-L)
- Results of the Western Australian state election, 2001 (Legislative Assembly M-Z)
- 2001 Western Australian state election
- Candidates of the Western Australian state election, 2001
- Members of the Western Australian Legislative Council, 2001–2005
