= Judith Adams (politician) =

Australian politician (1943–2012)

Senator for Western Australia
- In office 1 July 2005 – 31 March 2012
- Succeeded by: Dean Smith

Personal details
- Born: Judith Anne Bird; 11 April 1943 Picton, New Zealand
- Died: 31 March 2012 (aged 68) Kalamunda, Western Australia, Australia
- Party: Liberal Party of Australia
- Spouse(s): Gordon Adams (m 1970–2008) (his death)
- Children: Stuart Adams, Robert Adams
- Occupation: Nurse, farmer, midwife

Judith Anne Adams (née Bird; 11 April 1943 – 31 March 2012) was a New Zealand-born Australian politician, midwife, nurse, and farmer, who served as a member of the Australian Senate between 2005 and 2012, representing the state of Western Australia.

== Biography ==
Adams was born in Picton, New Zealand, and was a trained nurse and midwife experienced in health care policy, with a diploma in Operating Theatre Nursing. She joined the New Zealand Territorial Army as a nursing sister in 1963, and was later posted to Vietnam as a civilian nurse under the Colombo Plan during the Vietnam War. Adams emigrated to Australia in 1968, and was employed by the Medical Department of Western Australia as a member of the Emergency Nursing Service, which involved postings to regional Western Australian towns.

She met her future husband, Gordon Adams, a pilot for the Royal Flying Doctor Service, while serving in Meekatharra, whom she married in 1970. The couple leased a farm at Quindanning before purchasing a farm at Kojonup in 1972. While in Western Australia, she served as a councillor of the Healthcare Association of Western Australia, the Australian Healthcare Association, and the National Rural Health Alliance, and was a member of the Rural Health Reference Group. She was also a member of the State Executive of the Liberal Party of Australia between 2000 and 2004. Gordon died in 2008.

At the 2001 Western Australian state election, Adams was a candidate for the seat of Wagin, but was defeated by Terry Waldron. Adams was elected to the Senate at the 2004 federal election, with her term commencing on 1 July 2005, becoming the second-oldest woman to enter Australian parliament. During her period in parliament, she served as deputy opposition whip, and was involved in securing changes to wheat laws and defence force policy. Adams had been diagnosed with first-stage breast cancer in 1998, and secondary breast cancer in 2008. She died from the disease at Kalamunda Hospital in March 2012, aged 68.

The Parliament of Western Australia appointed Dean Smith on 2 May 2012 to Adams' Senate vacancy.

== See also ==
- Women in the Australian Senate
