= Jags Krishnan =

Australian politician

Jags Krishnan MLA
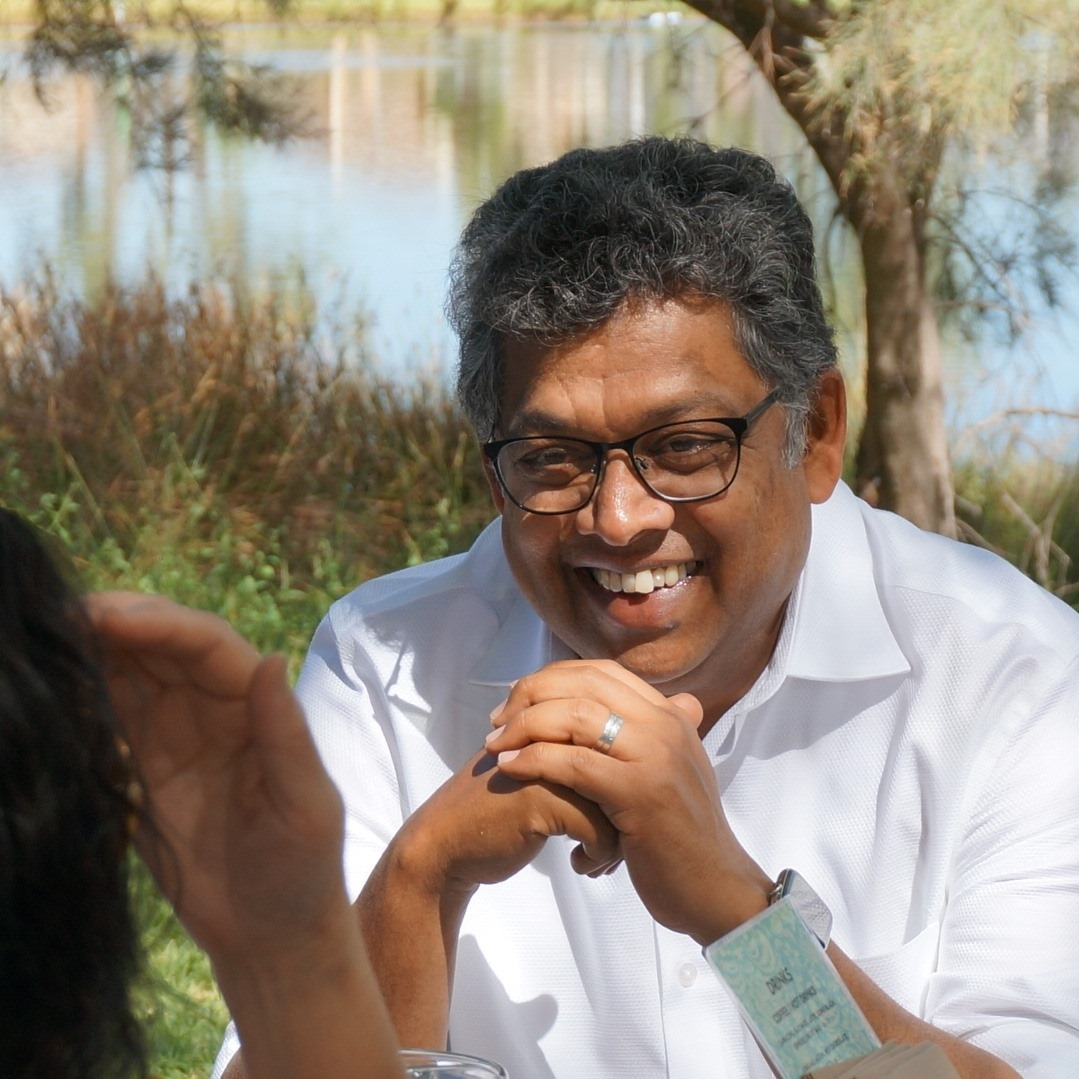

Member of the Western Australian Legislative Assembly for Riverton
- Incumbent
- Assumed office 13 March 2021
- Preceded by: Mike Nahan

Personal details
- Born: 23 April 1972 (age 54) Kotagiri, Nilgiris district, Tamil Nadu, India
- Party: Labor
- Children: 2
- Education: JSS Medical College
- Profession: General practitioner
- Website: riverton.walabor.org.au
- Nickname: Dr Jags

Jagadish "Jags" Krishnan (born 23 April 1972) is an Indian-born Australian politician and general practitioner. He was elected as a Labor member for Riverton in the Western Australian Legislative Assembly at the 2021 state election.

== Before politics ==
Krishnan was born on 23 April 1972 to Krishnan Bellie and Sarasu Krishnan. He was born and grew up in Kotagiri, Tamil Nadu, India, attending Kotagiri Public School, St Antony's Higher Secondary School in Coonoor and Bharathi Matriculation Higher Secondary School in Coimbatore. He then attended JSS Medical College. He lived in the United Kingdom from 2005 to 2006, before moving to Perth, Western Australia. He worked as a general practitioner for four years in Byford before starting a company of his own, Perth GP. His company now has over 20 clinics across Perth.

== Politics ==
Krishnan joined the WA Labor Party one year before the 2021 election.

=== 2021 election campaign ===
Krishnan was the Labor Party's candidate for the electoral district of Riverton for the 2021 Western Australian state election. Riverton had been held by Mike Nahan from the Liberal party since 2008, but he retired at the 2021 election. Krishnan's main opponent was Anthony Spagnolo.

Krishnan was criticised during the campaign for handing out a pamphlet claiming that he was a local to the electorate of Riverton, despite living in Mosman Park. He promised to move into the electorate if he won the election.

On 13 March 2021, Krishnan won the seat of Riverton with a 13.3% swing towards him.

In December 2022, he became a parliamentary secretary to Sue Ellery, the minister for finance, commerce, and women's interests.

Krishnan was re-elected in the 2025 Western Australian state election.

== Personal life ==
Krishnan is married and has two children. He is a Hindu. He is known by the nickname "Dr Jags" within the local community, and used it on election campaign material. He has interests in cricket and soccer. Krishnan is a member of the Leeming Spartan Cricket Club and also coaches a junior soccer team.

Western Australian Legislative Assembly
Preceded by Mike Nahan	Member for Riverton; 2021–present	Incumbent
