= Cambell Nalder =

Australian politician

Member of the Legislative Assembly for Narrogin
- In office 8 February 1986 – 14 March 1987
- Preceded by: Peter Jones
- Succeeded by: Bob Wiese

Personal details
- Born: 20 December 1937 Wagin, Western Australia
- Died: 14 March 1987 (aged 49) Wagin, Western Australia
- Party: The Nationals

Cambell Crawford Nalder (20 December 1937 – 14 March 1987) was an Australian politician who served as a National Party member of the Legislative Assembly of Western Australia from 1986 to 1987, representing the seat of Narrogin.

The son of Crawford Nalder, who later served as the state's Deputy Premier, Nalder was born in Wagin, a small town in the Great Southern region of Western Australia. Like his father, he went on to board at Wesley College, Perth, graduating in 1954. Nalder was elected to parliament at the 1986 state election, but died of cancer in March 1987, aged 49, having served just over a year. His death necessitated a by-election, which was won by National Party candidate Bob Wiese. Nalder's son, Dean Nalder, was elected as the Liberal Party member for Alfred Cove and later member for Bateman, while his niece, Karen Middleton, is the chief political correspondent for The Saturday Paper.
