= Electoral district of Melville =

Former electoral district in Perth, Western Australia

Melville Western Australia—Legislative Assembly
- State: Western Australia
- Dates current: 1950–1996
- Namesake: Melville

Melville was an electoral district of the Legislative Assembly in the Australian state of Western Australia from 1950 to 1996. The district was based in the southern suburbs of Perth.

== History ==
First contested at the 1950 state election, the seat's inaugural member was John Tonkin of the Labor Party, hitherto the member for North-East Fremantle since 1933. Tonkin served a long career in parliament, going to become Premier of Western Australia from 1971 to 1974. When Tonkin finally retired at the 1977 state election, he was succeeded by fellow Labor candidate Barry Hodge. Hodge served four terms before his defeat at the hands of Liberal candidate Doug Shave.

Melville was abolished ahead of the 1996 state election. Shave went on to become the member for the new seat of Alfred Cove.

== Members for Melville ==
Member	Party	Term
John Tonkin	Labor	1950–1977
Barry Hodge	Labor	1977–1989
Doug Shave	Liberal	1989–1996
