= Electoral district of Alfred Cove =

Former state electoral district of Western Australia

Alfred Cove Western Australia—Legislative Assembly
- State: Western Australia
- Dates current: 1996–2017
- Namesake: Alfred Cove
- Area: 16 km^{2} (6.2 sq mi)

Alfred Cove was an electoral district of the Legislative Assembly of Western Australia. It was located in Perth's southern suburbs, and named after the riverside suburb of Alfred Cove.

== History ==
Alfred Cove was created at the 1994 redistribution, created out of the northern riverside portions of the former seats of Applecross and part of Melville, and was first contested in the 1996 election at which Liberal member and Court government minister Doug Shave, who had previously represented Melville since the 1989 election, was successful. Alfred Cove, and Applecross before it, was regarded as very safe for the Liberal Party, but an Independent Liberal, Penny Hearne, who had formerly represented the Liberals against Kim Beazley in Brand at the previous federal election, had cut Shave's margin to just over 2%.

As Minister for Fair Trading, Shave was criticised over his department's handling of the so-called finance brokers' scandal in 1999–2000, where thousands of elderly investors faced losses estimated at over A$200 million. In particular, Shave was accused of giving preferential treatment to his own father-in-law to recover $100,000. The electorate at the 2001 census, taken shortly after the elections, had a median age of 40 and 28.7% of its population were over 55 years of age, and hence was unusually affected by the consequences of the finance brokers' scandal. The candidates at the 2001 election included Denise Brailey, an advocate for the elderly investors, and Dr Janet Woollard, the wife of former Australian Medical Association president Dr Keith Woollard who had started the Liberals for Forests party. In the event, with Labor not contesting, each got over 20% of the vote, with Woollard winning on preferences when Brailey and the Greens were eliminated and their votes distributed.

Woollard faced a strong opponent at the 2005 election in Liberal candidate and former Court government minister Graham Kierath, who had unexpectedly lost his seat of Riverton at the 2001 election on a 10% swing to the Labor Party. Despite Kierath winning on primary votes, Woollard once again won on preferences. Despite Woollard's presence, Alfred Cove remained a comfortably safe Liberal seat in "traditional" two-party match-ups with Labor, and it was a foregone conclusion that it would revert to the Liberals once she retired. Woollard did not contest the 2013 election and, as expected, Dean Nalder easily reclaimed the seat for the Liberals.

Alfred Cove was abolished in a redistribution in 2015, with effect from the 2017 state election. Its territory was distributed between Bateman and Bicton (a new seat), with Dean Nalder (the sitting member) winning preselection for Bateman.

== Demographics ==
Alfred Cove was ranked amongst the highest electorates by socio-economic status in Western Australia according to the SEIFA indexes, with high scores on educational and employment opportunity. At the 2006 census, the median individual income in the Alfred Cove electorate, based on its 2005 boundaries, was $577 per week compared to $513 in the Perth metropolitan area, and the median weekly household income was $1,166 compared to $1,086 across Perth, although these figures did not reflect retirees with high asset bases. 46.2% of the working population were professionals or managers. 30.3% of Alfred Cove's residents were over 55—the highest percentage of any State electorate—and had a median age of 41 years.

== Members for Alfred Cove ==
Member	Party	Term
Doug Shave	Liberal	1996–2001
Janet Woollard	Liberals for Forests	2001–2008
Janet Woollard	Independent Liberal	2008–2013
Dean Nalder	Liberal	2013–2017

== Election results ==
2013 Western Australian state election: Alfred Cove
Party	Candidate	Votes	%	±%
Liberal	Dean Nalder	13,523	64.4	+19.4
Labor	David Houston	3,532	16.8	–3.2
Independent Liberal	Janet Woollard	2,114	10.1	–13.3
Greens	Ros Harman	1,665	7.9	–2.0
	Estelle Gom	161	0.8	+0.8
Total formal votes		20,995	95.2	–0.7
Informal votes		1,047	4.8	+0.7
Turnout		22,042	91.4	
Two-party-preferred result
Liberal	Dean Nalder	15,445	73.6	+23.8
Labor	David Houston	5,544	26.4	+26.4
Liberal gain from Independent Liberal		Swing	N/A	
