= Anthony Spagnolo =

Australian politician

Member of the Western Australian Legislative Council
- Incumbent
- Assumed office 22 May 2025

Personal details
- Party: Liberal
- Education: University of Western Australia

Anthony Spagnolo is an Australian politician from the Western Australian Liberal Party.

== Early life and education ==
Spagnolo grew up in Riverton. Spagnolo studied at the University of Western Australia.

== Career ==
Anthony Spagnolo was an adviser to finance minister Mathias Cormann. After running unsuccessfully as a candidate in the 2021 Western Australian state election in Riverton, he was ultimately elected to the Western Australian Legislative Council in the 2025 Western Australian state election.

Spagnolo holds liberal and conservative views. He has argued for planning reform to boost housing supply and has called for the establishment of an independent parliamentary budget office to ensure that spending commitments are independently costed.
