= Mike Nahan =

Australian politician

The Honourable Mike Nahan
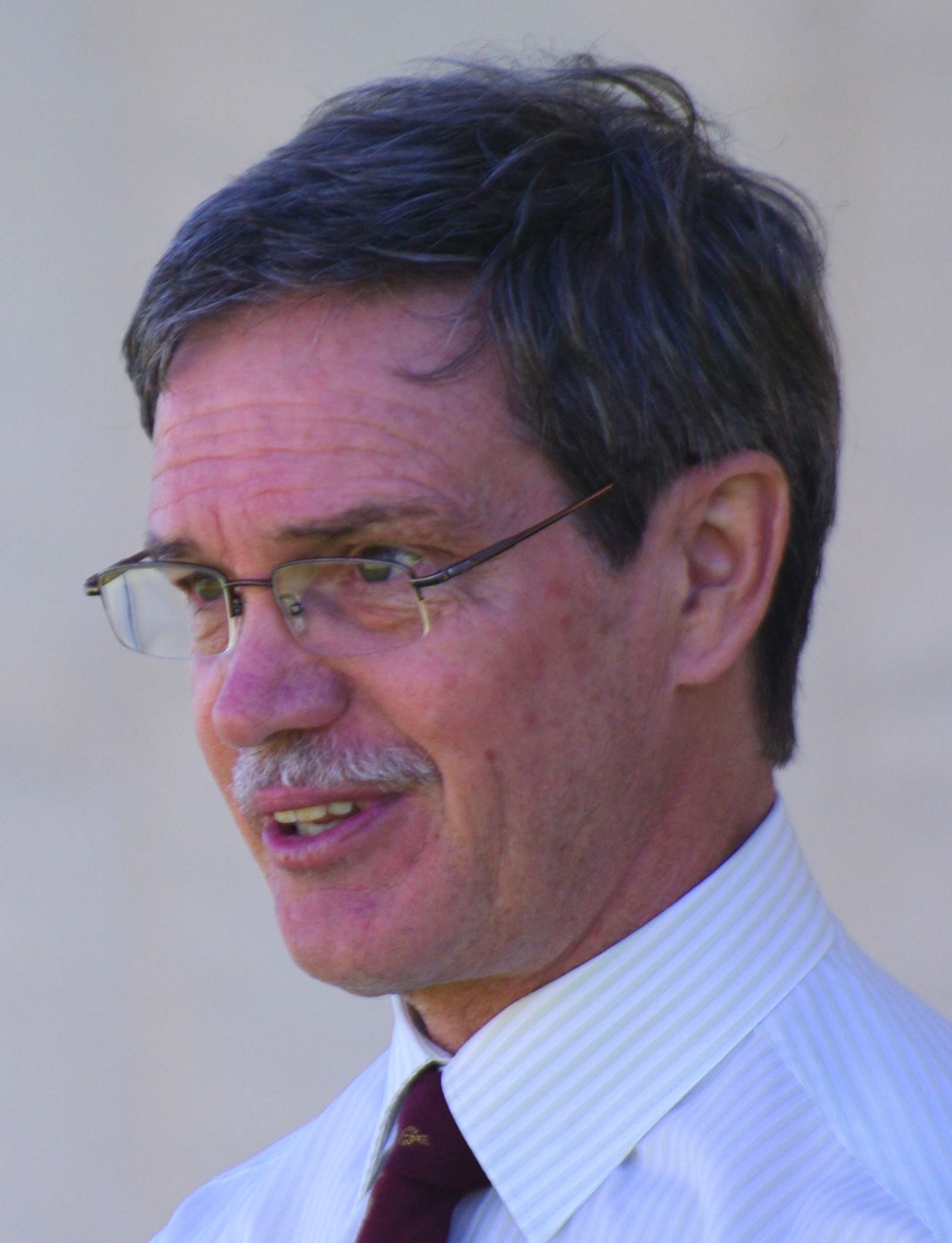

33rd Leader of the Opposition in Western Australia
- In office 21 March 2017 – 13 June 2019
- Premier: Mark McGowan
- Deputy: Liza Harvey
- Preceded by: Mark McGowan
- Succeeded by: Liza Harvey

Treasurer of Western Australia
- In office 17 March 2014 – 17 March 2017
- Premier: Colin Barnett
- Preceded by: Troy Buswell
- Succeeded by: Ben Wyatt

Western Australian Minister for Energy; Citizenship and Multicultural Interests
- In office 21 March 2013 – 17 March 2017
- Premier: Colin Barnett

Western Australian Minister for Finance
- In office 21 March 2013 – 17 March 2014
- Premier: Colin Barnett

Member of the Western Australian Legislative Assembly for Riverton
- In office 6 September 2008 – 29 January 2021
- Preceded by: Tony McRae
- Succeeded by: Jags Krishnan

Personal details
- Born: Michael Dennis Nahan; 2 July 1950 (age 76) Ann Arbor, Michigan, United States
- Party: Liberal Party
- Spouse: Nyuk Nahan
- Education: Western Michigan University; Australian National University
- Profession: Economist
- Website: mikenahan.com.au

Michael Dennis Nahan (born 2 July 1950) is an Australian politician who served as the leader of the Western Australian Liberal Party and Leader of the Opposition from the 2017 state election until his resignation in June 2019. He served as Treasurer of Western Australia under the Barnett ministry from March 2014 until the government's election defeat in March 2017. Nahan was also the Member of the Legislative Assembly for Riverton from 2008 until 2021, when he was succeeded by Labor's Jags Krishnan.

== Biography ==
Nahan was born in Ann Arbor, Michigan in 1950 as one of 13 children and grew up on a small farm, later graduating with a bachelor's degree in economics from Western Michigan University. After arriving in Australia in the late 1970s, he received a doctorate in economics from the Australian National University having previously completed a master's degree in agricultural economics.

Nahan arrived in Western Australia in July 1982. He joined the Western Australian Public Service before moving to the Institute of Public Affairs, a libertarian think tank, as a policy director. Between 1995 and 2005 he was Executive Director of the IPA.

== State politics ==
Nahan entered politics at the 2008 Western Australian state election when he defeated incumbent Labor MP Tony McRae for the seat of Riverton in southern Perth.

Nahan served as the Trustee of the Parliamentary Superannuation Board and was Chairman of the Economics and Industry Standing Committee in State Parliament from November 2008 to August 2012.

After the Liberal/National government was reelected at the 2013 Western Australian state election, Nahan was promoted to cabinet as Minister for Energy, Finance, and Citizenship and Multicultural Interests by Premier Colin Barnett.

=== Treasurer of Western Australia ===
Nahan was appointed as the Treasurer of Western Australia on 14 March 2014 following the resignation of Troy Buswell. His first budget as Treasurer was delivered in May 2014.

As Treasurer of Western Australia, Nahan presided over the loss of the state's AAA credit rating in August 2014 when state debt was downgraded to AA1 (further downgraded to AA2 in February 2016), and an unemployment rate of 6.5% in March 2017.

=== Leader of the Opposition ===
The Liberal government was roundly defeated at the 2017 state election, suffering the worst defeat of a sitting government in Western Australian history. Notably, the Liberals' support in Perth almost melted. The Liberals were cut down to only nine seats in the capital, including Nahan's. Following the defeat, Barnett resigned as WA Liberal leader and returned to the backbench.

Two days after the election, outgoing minister Bill Marmion indicated that Nahan had the most support in the much-reduced Liberal party room to succeed Barnett. He was elected unopposed as Liberal leader, and hence Leader of the Opposition, on 21 March, with outgoing Deputy Premier Liza Harvey remaining deputy leader.

Nahan has been compared to Ned Flanders, a character from The Simpsons, with The West Australian cartoonist Dean Alston drawing him in the style of the animated television show.

Nahan announced on 12 June 2019 he was stepping down from the parliamentary leadership of the Liberal Party. When asked who he will be backing as his replacement, he said it would be up to the Liberal party room to make that decision. Nahan also said that he had always planned to step down before the 2021 election, meaning that he never intended to take the Liberals into the campaign. He however disputed the suggestion that he was "warming the chair". His deputy, Harvey, was elected unopposed as party leader on 13 June 2019.

=== Later career ===
Soon after Harvey was elected his successor, Nahan became Shadow Minister for Planning in Harvey's shadow cabinet.

In March 2021, Nahan retired from Parliament, and did not seek re-election in his Riverton seat, which was gained by the Labor Party.

== Taxation and citizenship issues ==
In 2018, Nahan revealed a substantial disputed liability, believed to be potentially hundreds of thousands of dollars, to the United States Internal Revenue Service. Despite being a member of the Western Australian Legislative Assembly since September 2008 and Treasurer in the Barnett Government for three years, this possible liability was only disclosed in 2018 during a debate over eligibility of dual citizens.

During the debate, Nahan stated that he no longer held a U.S. passport but was unable to renounce his American citizenship until the debt was resolved. The issue arose in 2010 when the IRS changed the way in which it calculated liability from Australian superannuation recipients. Nahan is reported to be one many thousands of U.S. citizens caught up in the changes and is awaiting the outcome of several court cases in the United States where lawyers are confident that, if successful, his liability will be expunged. For Liberal Party colleagues the issue raised further concerns about his ability to lead the decimated party in parliament to the 2021 Western Australian state election unbeknownst to them of Nahan's intention to step down before that election as stated earlier in the article.

Western Australian Legislative Assembly
Preceded by Tony McRae	Member for Riverton; 2008–2021	Succeeded by Jags Krishnan
Political offices
Preceded by Troy Buswell	Treasurer of Western Australia; 2014–2017	Succeeded by Ben Wyatt
Preceded by Colin Barnett	Leader of the Opposition in Western Australia; 2017–2019	Succeeded by Liza Harvey
Party political offices
Preceded by Colin Barnett	Leader of the Liberal Party in Western Australia; 2017–2019	Succeeded by Liza Harvey
Non-profit organization positions
Preceded by John Hyde	Executive Director of Institute of Public Affairs; 1995–2005	Succeeded by John Roskam
