= Bob Wiese (politician) =

Australian politician (born 1940)

Robert Laurence Wiese (born 9 November 1940) is a former Australian politician. He was a National Party member of the Western Australian Legislative Assembly, representing Narrogin from 1987 to 1989 and Wagin from 1989 to 2001. From 1993 to 1997 he was Minister for Police and Emergency Services.

Western Australian Legislative Assembly
Preceded by Cambell Nalder	Member for Narrogin; 1987–1989	Abolished
New seat	Member for Wagin; 1989–2001	Succeeded by Terry Waldron
