= Graham Kierath =

Australian politician

The Honourable Graham Kierath

Western Australian Minister for Labour Relations
- In office 16 February 1993 – 28 July 1998
- Premier: Richard Court
- Preceded by: Yvonne Henderson
- Succeeded by: Cheryl Edwardes

Member of the Western Australian Parliament for Riverton
- In office 4 February 1989 – 10 February 2001
- Preceded by: New creation
- Succeeded by: Tony McRae

Personal details
- Born: Graham Donald Kierath; 21 July 1950 (age 76) Subiaco, Western Australia
- Citizenship: Australian
- Party: Liberal Party

Graham Donald Kierath (born 21 July 1950) is a former Australian politician who served 11 years in the Parliament of Western Australia. He is best known for his five-year term as Western Australian Minister for Labour Relations.

== Political career ==
Kierath was elected to the seat of Riverton in the Western Australian Legislative Assembly at the 1989 Western Australian election, representing the Liberal Party.

After the election of Richard Court as Western Australian Premier in 1993, Kierath was appointed as Minister for Labour Relations. Soon after taking on the role, he initiated the first of what were to become three waves of industrial relations changes. The first wave involved legislation to allow employees to directly negotiate workplace contracts with employers. Those changes attracted fierce criticism from the labour and union movements, with stickers being produced reading "Kierath's a Wanker". In 1993, Kierath introduced the Workplace Agreements Act 1993, the most significant and fundamental reform of the Western Australian industrial relations system since the enactment of the original Conciliation and Arbitration Act in 1900.

In 1997 Kierath introduced anti-smoking regulations that banned smoking in all enclosed workplaces from mid-1998. While the regulations were criticised by the hotel industry, the Australian Medical Association recognised him with the "AMA President's Award".

== Later career ==
Following his unexpected defeat at the 2001 election, after a 10.16% swing against him, Kierath remained closely involved with the WA Liberal Party and retained his political ambitions. He unsuccessfully contested the preselection for his former seat at the 2005 state election but was the Liberal Party candidate in the seat of Alfred Cove, where he was beaten by the sitting independent Janet Woollard. He failed to gain preselection for the electorate of Murdoch in 2008. He became president of the party's Tangney division.
