= Electoral district of Narrogin =

Former electoral district of Western Australia

Narrogin Western Australia—Legislative Assembly
- State: Western Australia
- Dates current: 1950–1989
- Namesake: Narrogin

Narrogin was an electoral district of the Legislative Assembly in the Australian state of Western Australia from 1950 to 1989.

The district centred on the town of Narrogin in the southern part of the state. The seat was won on every occasion by the National Party.

== Members ==
Member	Party	Term
Victor Doney	Country	1950–1956
William Manning	Country	1956–1974
Peter Jones	Country	1974–1975
Peter Jones	National Country	1975–1985
Peter Jones	Liberal	1985–1986
Cambell Nalder	National	1986–1987
Bob Wiese	National	1987–1989
