= Seniors United Party of Australia =

Australian political party

- Spokesperson: Bob Patrech
- Founded: 2015; 11 years ago
- Headquarters: Wollongong, New South Wales
- Ideology: Seniors' interests
- Colours: Grey; Red; Blue

Website
- www.seniorsunitedparty.com.au

The Seniors United Party of Australia (SUPA) is an Australian political party. It was known as Seniors United NSW until 3 March 2016. The party was founded by Ray Morritt, Nick Agnew, Frank Fitzpatrick and Neil Smith who were dissatisfied with the NSW Government's legislation on retirement villages and other seniors issues. The party was deregistered by the AEC on 29 June 2022, but remains active.

== History ==
Other parties have previously competed in Australian elections under a similar name. NSW MLC Beryl Evans formed The Seniors, the Seniors Party ran candidates in the 2001 Western Australian state election, and a group called 'Seniors' contested the 1999 New South Wales state election. None of them had any electoral success.

The Seniors United Party's first three candidates contested the 2016 federal election, aiming to represent New South Wales in the Australian Senate. They were Gillian Evans, Kerry Koliadis and Chris Osborne. Evans was ranked as the 26th candidate out of 151 and the party ranked 17th out of 41 groups on the New South Wales Senate ballot paper, counting only first preferences.

The party fielded a candidate in the 2017 New England by-election. Warwick Stacey polled 16th of the 17 candidates, with 0.39% of the vote.

On 7 February 2018, the Australian Electoral Commission (AEC) issued a notice that it was considering deregistering the party on the grounds that it had no longer had 500 members. In May 2018, following a request by the party for a second membership review, the AEC allowed it to retain its registration.

The party was de-registered in March 2021 because it had fewer than 500 members. After an appeal, the party was re-registered in November 2021 and contested the 2022 federal election, although none of its candidates were successful.

Fred Nile, a member of the New South Wales Legislative Council, joined the party in 2022 after the dissolution of the Christian Democratic Party. However, SUPA was not registered with the New South Wales Electoral Commission and Nile left the party. It was deregistered as a federal party less than two months later for having fewer than 1,500 members.

The party registered as an incorporated association on 28 April 2022. As of January 2025, its president was Bob Patrech and its vice-president was John Williamson.
