= Electoral district of Wagin =

State electoral district of Western Australia

Wagin Western Australia—Legislative Assembly
- State: Western Australia
- Dates current: 1911–1950; 1989–2017
- Namesake: Wagin
- Area: 72,488 km^{2} (27,987.8 sq mi)

Wagin was an electoral district of the Legislative Assembly of Western Australia. It was in existence from 1911 to 1950 and from 1989 to 2017. The seat was named after the town of Wagin and incorporated portions of the Wheatbelt, albeit with varying boundaries. Wagin was a safe seat for the National Party for most of its existence.

== History ==
Wagin was first created for the 1911 state election. Until 1947, its member was Sydney Stubbs who represented several different conservative parties over that time. Stubbs was succeeded by Crawford Nalder, who would later become Country Party leader. Wagin was abolished ahead of the 1950 state election whence Nalder instead became the member for Katanning.

Wagin was recreated at the 1989 state election. The first member of the recreated seat was National MP Bob Wiese, formerly the member for Narrogin; the district that Wagin largely replaced. Wiese was succeeded by current member and National MP Terry Waldron at the 2001 state election. Waldron held the seat until Wagin was abolished in a redistribution prior to the 2017 state election. Its territory was incorporated in the seats of Albany, Central Wheatbelt, Roe and Warren-Blackwood.

In its last incarnation, Wagin was a large rural electorate in the southern part of the Wheatbelt region. Its major population centres included Cuballing, Boddington, Brookton, Corrigin, Gnowangerup, Hyden, Lake Grace, Katanning, Kojonup, Narrogin and Wagin.

== Members for Wagin ==
Wagin (1911–1950)
Member	Party	Term
Sydney Stubbs	Liberal (WA)	1911–1917
Sydney Stubbs	Country	1917–1923
Sydney Stubbs	Country (MCP)	1923–1924
Sydney Stubbs	Nationalist	1924–1927
Sydney Stubbs	Country	1927–1947
Crawford Nalder	Country	1947–1950
Wagin (1989–2017)
Member	Party	Term
Bob Wiese	National	1989–2001
Terry Waldron	National	2001–2017

== Election results ==
2013 Western Australian state election: Wagin
Party	Candidate	Votes	%	±%
National	Terry Waldron	12,108	63.7	+0.4
Liberal	Phillip Blight	3,316	17.4	+0.3
Labor	Josh Stokes	2,122	11.2	+0.4
Greens	Shirley Collins	849	4.5	+0.7
Christians	Jacky Young	620	3.3	–0.6
Total formal votes		19,015	95.6	–1.1
Informal votes		869	4.4	+1.1
Turnout		19,884	90.7	
Two-party-preferred result
Liberal	Phillip Blight	14,408	75.8	+0.9
Labor	Josh Stokes	4,588	24.2	–0.9
Two-candidate-preferred result
National	Terry Waldron	14,623	76.9	–1.5
Liberal	Phillip Blight	4,390	23.1	+1.5
National hold		Swing	–1.5	
