= Doug Shave =

Australian politician

Douglas James Shave (4 January 1947 – 5 August 2017) was an Australian politician.

He was born in Perth and was a hotel and business proprietor before entering politics. He played three games of Australian rules football for Claremont in 1968, kicking 6 goals. In 1989 he was elected to the Western Australian Legislative Assembly as the Liberal member for Melville, moving to Alfred Cove in 1996. From 1992 to 1993 he was Shadow Minister for Small Business, and in 1993 was appointed Minister for Tourism, Housing and Sport and Recreation. Later that year he relinquished his front bench role, and remained on the backbench until his appointment as a parliamentary secretary in 1995. In 1997 he returned to the front bench as Minister for Lands, Fair Trading, and Parliamentary and Electoral Affairs, but he lost his seat in 2001.

Western Australian Legislative Assembly
Preceded by Barry Hodge	Member for Melville; 1989–1996	Abolished
New seat	Member for Alfred Cove; 1996–2001	Succeeded by Janet Woollard
