= Terry Waldron =

Australian politician

The Honourable Terry Waldron AM

Member of the Western Australian Legislative Assembly for Wagin
- In office 20 February 2001 – 30 January 2017
- Preceded by: Bob Wiese
- Succeeded by: seat abolished

Personal details
- Born: 17 February 1951 (age 75) Cottesloe Western Australia
- Party: The Nationals
- Spouse: Noelene

Terrence (Terry) Keith "Tuck" Waldron AM (born 17 February 1951) is an Australian politician. He was a The Nationals member of the Western Australian Legislative Assembly from 2001 to 2017, representing the electorate of Wagin.

Waldron was born in Subiaco grew up on his family farm in Jingalup near Kojonup and attended the local primary school before going to boarding school at Hale School in Perth

After completing his high school education Waldron briefly returned to the family farm for a year before moving back to Perth to work in the insurance industry and further his football and cricket career. He played 29 games for the Claremont Football Club in the Western Australian National Football League (WANFL), and later 17 games for the South Adelaide Football Club in the South Australian National Football League (SANFL). He then returned to Kojonup in 1975 and worked in real estate, eventually managing the regional branch of Elders. In 1992 he was appointed the general manager of the West Australian Country Football League and continued in that position until entering politics.

Following the retirement of Bob Wiese, Waldron won National Party preselection for the seat of Wagin. In the following election in 2001 Waldron won the seat with a margin of 26%. Waldron was re-elected in the 2005 election by a margin of 19%. He held the seat until his retirement in 2017.

He is married to Noelene Waldron and they have four children; Jemma, Kelly, Bonnie and Jessica.

Western Australian Legislative Assembly
Preceded by Bob Wiese	Member for Wagin; 2001–2017	Abolished
