= Tony McRae (politician) =

Australian politician

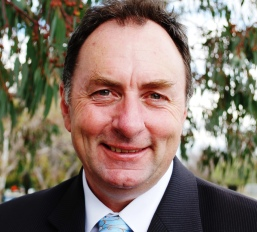
- In office 10 February 2001 – 6 September 2008
- Preceded by: Graham Kierath
- Succeeded by: Mike Nahan
- Constituency: Riverton

Personal details
- Born: Anthony David McRae; 7 April 1957 (age 69) Tumut, New South Wales
- Party: Labor Party

Anthony David McRae (born 7 April 1957 in Tumut, New South Wales) was an ALP member of the Western Australian Legislative Assembly from 2001 to 2008, representing the electorate of Riverton. McRae unexpectedly won the traditionally Liberal seat of Riverton in the 2001 Gallop-led election and held the seat at the 2005 election.

== Career ==
=== Early career ===
McRae moved to Western Australia from Tumut NSW in 1980 to work as an electrician in the Pilbara iron ore industry and became active in the Electrical Trades Union of Australia. He moved to Perth in 1985, working as a senior labour market adviser to Industrial relations Minister and Premier Peter Dowding and Employment & Training Minister Gordon Hill. In 1991 McRae was a consultant with Murdoch University colleagues on greenhouse gas/energy efficiency, including an analysis of energy use at Argyle diamond mine and Warmun community and in 1995 McRae was appointed the first National Director of Research & Information at the National Native Title Tribunal (1995-2000).

=== Politics ===
While in parliament McRae served as:

- Acting Speaker, Legislative Assembly (2001-2005).
- Chairperson, Economics & Industry Committee (2001-2005)
- Parliamentary Secretary to the Minister for Agriculture and Forestry (2005-2006).
- Parliamentary Secretary to the Minister for Resources; Assistant Minister for State Development and Employment Protection (2006).
- Minister for Disability Services, Citizenship and Multicultural Interests and Assistant Minister for Planning and Infrastructure (2006).
- Minister for the Environment; Disability Service; Climate Change (2006-2007).

McRae was Western Australia's first Minister for Climate Change and co-authored the State's 2007 Climate Change Action Policy. He instigated a review of Western Australia's disability services programs and led debate in national forums for an equitable distribution of Commonwealth Disability funding - policy reform that paved the way for development of the National Disability Insurance Scheme.

Other notable portfolio achievements include completing the expansion of the Dampier-Bunbury Gas pipeline reserve through the controversial Perth-Bunbury corridor; leading negotiations with landholders and conservationists on the State's $350m natural resource management plan; leading the opposition against the Australian Nationalist Movement fire bombings of Chinese restaurants in 2004; being one of the first Australian political delegation leaders to visit Indonesia following Timor-Leste's independence.

McRae was one of a number of ministers who resigned in 2007 following CCC investigations into lobbyists and business-Government relations. A 2008 parliamentary report recommended that no action be taken against Mr McRae. Like others caught up in the then-unregulated world of political lobbyists, McRae had an adverse finding made about his dealings with lobbyists and former ALP members, Julian Grill and Brian Burke. The WA CCC Parliamentary Commissioner noted in his report on the matter that McRae had "neither requested nor received" any benefit from his dealings with the lobbyists.

At the 2008 election, the Labor Party lost government, with a statewide swing against it of more than 6.5%, and McRae lost his seat of Riverton by 64 votes (a 2pp swing of 2.2%).

=== Post-politics ===
- Company Director & Consultant (2019 - present)
- Chief Executive Officer and Company Secretary, Jamukurnu Yapalikurnu Aboriginal Corporation (JYAC) formerly Western Desert Lands Aboriginal Corporation (WDLAC), the native prescribed body corporate and native title trustee for the Martu people. (2018-2024)
- Chief Executive Officer and Company Secretary for IBN Corporation (IBN Corporation), one of WA's largest Aboriginal-owned corporations and charitable trusts (2015–18)
- Chairperson of the Pilbara Aboriginal Corporations and Enterprises Association. (2016–19)
- Deputy Chairperson/Director, Association for Services to Torture & Trauma Survivors (ASeTTS) (2019-2025)
- Council Member, National Native Title Council (JYAC, 2019-2024)
- Key note speaker/Delegate (indicative): Timor Leste 2016 election policy forum; AIATSIS 2020 National Conference; Pilbara Industry Roundtable II, 2024
- Project Leader, Timor-Leste national labour market plan (2010–11)
- Manager of SMYL Community School, an alternative school for disengaged youth (2012–14)
- Industry consultant and researcher on labour market implications and opportunities of low-carbon technologies for Indigenous people (2009–14)
