= Janet Woollard =

Australian politician

Dr Janet Woollard

Member of the Western Australian Legislative Assembly for Alfred Cove
- In office 10 February 2001 – 9 March 2013
- Preceded by: Doug Shave
- Succeeded by: Dean Nalder

Personal details
- Born: 13 February 1955 (age 71) London, England
- Party: Independent Liberal
- Other political affiliations: Liberals for Forests (1999−2008)
- Spouse: Dr Keith Woollard
- Profession: Registered Nurse

Janet May Woollard (born 13 February 1955) is an Australian former politician who served as a member for the seat of Alfred Cove in the Western Australian Legislative Assembly from 2001 to 2013.

Woollard successfully contested the seat in the February 2001 state election as an independent candidate (representing the Liberals for Forests party). She was re-elected in 2005 and again in 2008.

In 2007 Woollard's son, Luke, crashed his family's boat whilst drink driving, seriously injuring a passenger. The injured passenger successfully sued Luke, who said he was unable to pay the A$230,000 compensation and indicated he faced bankruptcy. Woollard and her husband initially refused to pay the compensation on behalf of their son. However, they settled the case following intense media scrutiny.

After Liberals for Forests dissolved in 2008, Woollard sat in parliament as an Independent Liberal.

Woollard voted with the Liberal Party most of the time while serving in parliament.

Woollard was defeated in the 2013 state election, attracting only about 10% of the primary vote. The seat was won by the Liberal candidate, Dean Nalder.

Western Australian Legislative Assembly
Preceded by Doug Shave	Member for Alfred Cove; 2001–2013	Succeeded by Dean Nalder
