= Liberals for Forests =

Former Australian political party

- Abbreviation: LFF
- Founder: Keith Woollard
- Founded: 3 July 1999; 26 years ago
- Registered: 1 May 2001; 24 years ago
- Dissolved: 2011; 15 years ago
- Ideology: Green liberalism
- Western Australian Legislative Assembly: 1 / 57 (2001−2008)
- Albany City Council: 1 / 12 (2001)

Website
- liberalsfor.forests.org.au

Liberals for Forests (LFF) was an Australian political party. It contested both state and federal elections between 2001 and 2008, but only ever achieved one elected representative – Janet Woollard in Western Australia. It never achieved representation at the federal level.

The party was founded in 1999 by Dr Keith Woollard, husband of Janet Woollard and an ex-AMA president. Janet successfully contested a seat at the 2001 state election, and was re-elected in 2005 and again in 2008 as an Independent Liberal.

The party generally professed itself to be ideologically aligned with the centre-right sympathies of the Liberal Party, but was aligned with Labor in certain states such as NSW but with a greater regard to environmentalism.

Despite its low profile, the party gained a respectable proportion of the primary senate vote in some states. For example, in the 2004 election it received only a few hundred votes less than the Australian Democrats in Victoria.

== Name ==
The registered party name at the Australian Electoral Commission and the Western Australian Electoral Commission was "liberals for forests" (uncapitalised), but it was known in newspapers as "Liberals for Forests". By late 2009, Liberals for Forests was no longer a registered political party anywhere in Australia.

== See also ==
- Fusion Party (Australia)
- Progressive Green Party (New Zealand) – a similar party in New Zealand
- Small-l liberal – a term used by LFF candidates to describe themselves in order to attract the support of mildly disenchanted coalition voters
- Teal independents – a loosely-aligned group of independent and minor party politicians characterised as strongly advocating for increased action to mitigate climate change.
