= 2001 Western Australian state election =

- 10 February 2001

All 57 seats in the Western Australian Legislative Assembly and all 36 seats in the Western Australian Legislative Council 29 Assembly seats were needed for a majority
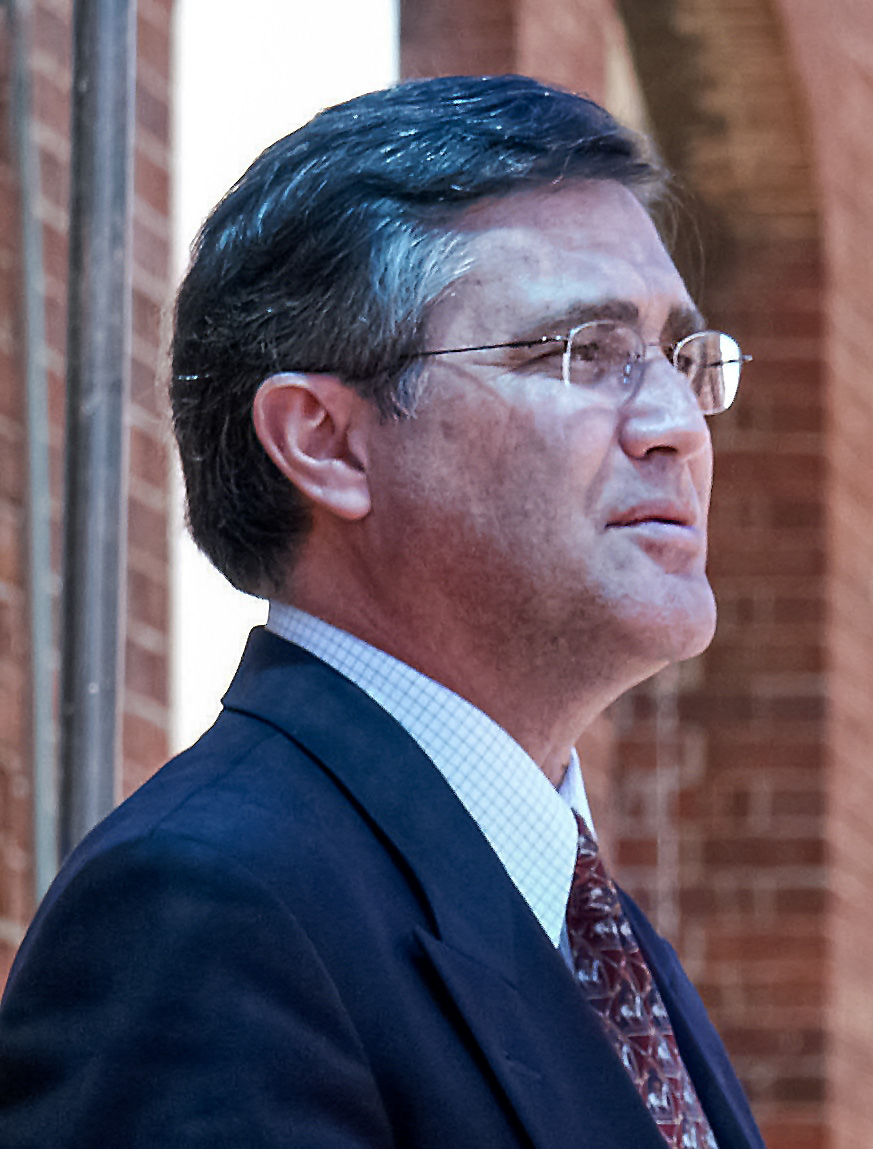

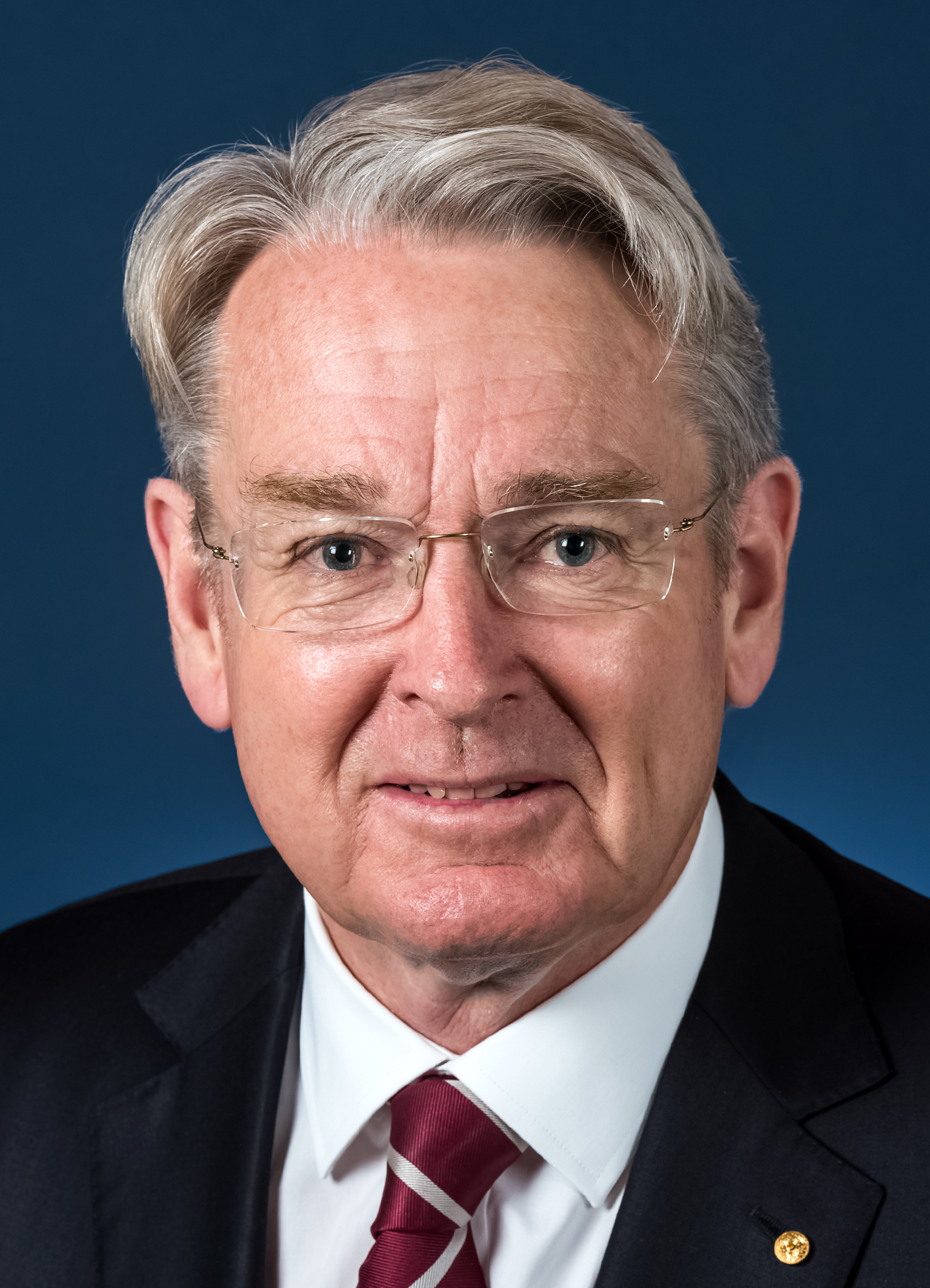
	First party	Second party	Third party
			LFF
Leader	Geoff Gallop	Richard Court	Janet Woollard
Party	Labor	Liberal/National coalition	Liberals for Forests
Leader since	8 October 1996	12 May 1992	3 July 1999
Leader's seat	Victoria Park	Nedlands	Alfred Cove (won seat)
Last election	19 seats	35 seats	—
Seats won	32	21	1
Seat change	▲13	▼14	New
Popular vote	382,308	353,377	16,790
Percentage	37.24%	34.42%	1.64%
Swing	▲1.42	▼11.14	New
TPP	52.92%	47.08%
TPP swing	▲8.09	▼8.09
Premier before election
Richard Court
Liberal/National coalition
Elected Premier
Geoff Gallop
Labor

Elections were held in the state of Western Australia on 10 February 2001 to elect all 57 members to the Legislative Assembly and all 34 members to the Legislative Council. The two-term Liberal–National coalition government, led by Premier Richard Court, was defeated by the Labor Party, led by Opposition Leader Geoff Gallop, in a landslide.

The election produced the biggest change of seats at any election since 1911, with Labor winning 14 seats from the Coalition as well as an Independent-held seat, while losing the seat of Kalgoorlie for the first time since 1923 to Liberal candidate Matt Birney. Meanwhile, a minister in the outgoing Government, Doug Shave, lost his seat of Alfred Cove to Independent candidate Janet Woollard, who was also a member of the Liberals for Forests party.

This was the first election in Western Australian history where the Australian Greens Party overtook the National Party in its share of the state vote.

== Results ==
=== Legislative Assembly ===
Western Australian state election, 10 February 2001 Legislative Assembly << 1996–2005 >>
Enrolled voters	1,187,629				
Votes cast	1,075,556		Turnout	90.56%	+0.57%
Informal votes	48,836		Informal	4.54%	+0.15%
Summary of votes by party
Party	Primary votes	%	Swing	Seats	Change
Labor	382,308	37.24%	▲+1.42%	32	+13
Liberal	319,927	31.16%	▼–8.61%	16	–13
One Nation	98,321	9.58%	New	0	± 0
Greens	74,641	7.27%	▲+2.54%	0	± 0
National	33,450	3.26%	▼–2.53%	5	– 1
Democrats	27,102	2.64%	▼–2.44%	0	± 0
Liberals for Forests	16,790	1.64%	New	1	+1
Christian Democrats	9,893	0.96%	▲+0.78%	0	± 0
Curtin Labor Alliance	4,120	0.40%	New	0	± 0
Seniors Party	3,022	0.29%	New	0	± 0
Independent^{[1]}	55,589	5.41%	▼–2.42%	3	± 0
Not affiliated	1,557	0.15%	▼-0.75%	0	± 0
Total	1,026,720			57	
Two-party-preferred
Labor	538,759	52.92%	▲+8.09%		
Liberal/National	479,209	47.08%	▼–8.09%		

Notes:

^{1} At the 1996 election, Labor Party member Larry Graham won the Pilbara seat. He resigned from the party during the term of parliament, and won his seat as an independent in 2001. The retirement of Labor independent Ernie Bridge, whose seat of Kimberley was subsequently won at the election by Labor candidate Carol Martin.

=== Legislative Council ===
Western Australian state election, 10 February 2001 Legislative Council
Enrolled voters	1,187,629				
Votes cast	1,077,186		Turnout	90.70%	+0.56%
Informal votes	28,434		Informal	2.64%	–0.37%
Summary of votes by party
Party	Primary votes	%	Swing	Seats	Change
Labor	397,846	37.94%	▲+6.88%	13	+ 1
Liberal	356,126	33.96%	N/A^{[1]}	12	– 2
National	25,204	2.40%	N/A^{[1]}	1	– 2
One Nation	103,571	9.88%	New	3	+ 3
Greens	83,883	8.00%	▲+2.45%	5	+ 2
Democrats	38,968	3.72%	▼–2.86%	0	– 2
Christian Democrats	16,105	1.54%	▲+0.86%	0	± 0
Curtin Labor Alliance	8,985	0.86%	New	0	± 0
Seniors Party	954	0.09%	New	0	± 0
Other parties	180	0.02%	▼–3.83%	0	± 0
Independent	16,930	1.61%	▼–2.91%	0	± 0
Total	1,048,752			34	

Notes:

^{1} At the 1996 election, the Liberals and Nationals ran a combined ticket in two regions, ran separately in a third, and the Liberals ran alone in the remaining three. The two parties received a combined vote of 46.45%. As such, the swing against the Coalition in the Legislative Council was 10.09%.

== Seats changing hands ==
Seat	Pre-2001			Swing	Post-2001		
Seat	Party	Member	Margin	Swing	Margin	Member	Party
Albany	Liberal	Kevin Prince	11.9	15.6	3.7	Peter Watson	Labor
Alfred Cove	Liberal	Doug Shave	2.4	9.8	7.4	Janet Woollard	Liberals for Forests
Ballajura	Liberal	Rhonda Parker	0.1	5.1	5.0	John D'Orazio	Labor
Bunbury	Liberal	Ian Osborne	5.3	6.8	1.5	Tony Dean	Labor
Collie	National	Hilda Turnbull	9.3	9.4	0.1	Mick Murray	Labor
Geraldton	Liberal	Bob Bloffwitch	7.0	11.3	4.3	Shane Hill	Labor
Innaloo	Liberal	George Strickland	4.0	8.5	4.5	John Quigley	Labor
Joondalup	Liberal	Chris Baker	5.5	6.3	0.8	Tony O'Gorman	Labor
Kalgoorlie	Labor	Megan Anwyl	4.4	5.5	1.1	Matt Birney	Liberal
Kimberley	Independent	Ernie Bridge	11.5	22.0	10.5	Carol Martin	Labor
Mandurah	Liberal	Roger Nicholls	3.0	7.9	4.9	David Templeman	Labor
Pilbara	Labor	Larry Graham	15.7	34.9	19.2	Larry Graham	Independent
Riverton	Liberal	Graham Kierath	6.7	9.7	3.0	Tony McRae	Labor
Roleystone	Liberal	Fred Tubby	7.2	12.1	4.9	Martin Whitely	Labor
Southern River	Liberal	Monica Holmes	1.5	4.9	3.4	Paul Andrews	Labor
Swan Hills	Liberal	June van de Klashorst	9.7	11.7	2.0	Jaye Radisich	Labor
Wanneroo	Liberal	Iain MacLean	1.6	7.5	5.9	Dianne Guise	Labor
Yokine	Liberal	Kim Hames	3.2	6.6	3.4	Bob Kucera	Labor

- Members listed in italics did not contest their seat at this election.

== Post-election pendulum ==
Labor seats (32)
Marginal
Collie	Mick Murray	ALP	0.1%
Joondalup	Tony O'Gorman	ALP	0.8%
Bunbury	Tony Dean	ALP	1.5%
Swan Hills	Jaye Radisich	ALP	2.0%
Riverton	Tony McRae	ALP	3.0%
Southern River	Paul Andrews	ALP	3.4%
Yokine	Bob Kucera	ALP	3.4%
Albany	Peter Watson	ALP	3.7%
Geraldton	Shane Hill	ALP	4.3%
Innaloo	John Quigley	ALP	4.5%
Mandurah	David Templeman	ALP	4.9%
Roleystone	Martin Whitely	ALP	4.9%
Ballajura	John D'Orazio	ALP	5.0%
Wanneroo	Dianne Guise	ALP	5.9%
Fairly safe
Armadale	Alannah MacTiernan	ALP	7.1% v IND
Eyre	John Bowler	ALP	7.9%
Safe
Thornlie	Sheila McHale	ALP	10.4%
Kimberley	Carol Martin	ALP	10.5%
Perth	John Hyde	ALP	11.3%
Midland	Michelle Roberts	ALP	13.5%
Victoria Park	Geoff Gallop	ALP	13.8%
Maylands	Judy Edwards	ALP	14.5%
Belmont	Eric Ripper	ALP	14.7%
Burrup	Fred Riebeling	ALP	15.0%
Rockingham	Mark McGowan	ALP	15.6%
Willagee	Alan Carpenter	ALP	15.7%
Peel	Norm Marlborough	ALP	16.5%
Fremantle	Jim McGinty	ALP	17.2%
Nollamara	John Kobelke	ALP	17.3%
Cockburn	Fran Logan	ALP	18.3%
Girrawheen	Margaret Quirk	ALP	18.4%
Bassendean	Clive Brown	ALP	19.1%

Liberal/National seats (21)
Marginal
Darling Range	John Day	LIB	0.3%
Hillarys	Rob Johnson	LIB	1.0%
Kalgoorlie	Matt Birney	LIB	1.1%
Ningaloo	Rod Sweetman	LIB	2.4%
Kingsley	Cheryl Edwardes	LIB	2.9%
Dawesville	Arthur Marshall	LIB	2.9%
Murray-Wellington	John Bradshaw	LIB	3.0%
Avon	Max Trenorden	NAT	4.8%
Nedlands	Richard Court	LIB	4.9% v IND
Vasse	Bernie Masters	LIB	5.5%
Wagin	Terry Waldron	NAT	5.9% v LIB
Fairly safe
Murdoch	Mike Board	LIB	6.6%
Mitchell	Dan Sullivan	LIB	8.2%
Greenough	Jamie Edwards	LIB	9.4%
Safe
Carine	Katie Hodson-Thomas	LIB	10.0%
Cottesloe	Colin Barnett	LIB	11.3%
Stirling	Monty House	NAT	12.4%
Warren-Blackwood	Paul Omodei	LIB	14.4%
Moore	Bill McNee	LIB	15.1%
Roe	Ross Ainsworth	NAT	21.7%
Merredin	Hendy Cowan	NAT	22.9%
Crossbench seats (4)
Alfred Cove	Janet Woollard	LFF	7.4% v LIB
South Perth	Phillip Pendal	IND	12.8% v LIB
Churchlands	Liz Constable	IND	19.2% v LIB
Pilbara	Larry Graham	IND	19.2% v ALP

== See also ==
- Candidates of the 2001 Western Australian state election
- Members of the Western Australian Legislative Assembly, 1996–2001
- Members of the Western Australian Legislative Assembly, 2001–2005
