= Electoral district of Riverton =

State electoral district in Perth, Western Australia

Riverton Western Australia—Legislative Assembly
- Interactive map of electoral district boundaries from the 2025 state election
- State: Western Australia
- Dates current: 1989–present
- MP: Jags Krishnan
- Party: Labor
- Namesake: Riverton
- Electors: 31,245 (2025)
- Area: 23 km^{2} (8.9 sq mi)
- Demographic: Metropolitan
- Coordinates: 32.05°S 115.90°E
Electorates around Riverton:
| Bateman | South Perth | Victoria Park |
| Bateman | Riverton | Cannington |
| Bibra Lake | Jandakot | Jandakot |

Riverton is a Legislative Assembly electorate in the state of Western Australia. Riverton is named for the southern Perth suburb of Riverton, which falls within its borders.

== History ==
Riverton was created at the 1988 redistribution, replacing the abolished district of Clontarf, which had been a safe Liberal seat since a redistribution prior to the 1977 election. Riverton was first contested at the 1989 election, at which Liberal Party member Graham Kierath was successful. He served as a minister in the Court government, and held the seat until his unexpected defeat at the 2001 election on a 10.16% swing. The seat was then held by Tony McRae of the Labor Party, until his defeat by the Liberal Party's Mike Nahan at the 2008 election. McRae was the Minister for Environment, Climate Change and Disability Services between 2006 and 2008. Mike Nahan retired at the 2021 election, and the seat was won back by the Labor party with a 13.3% swing towards them.

== Geography ==
Riverton is bounded by the Canning River to the north, Bannister Creek and High Road to the northeast, Nicholson Road to the east, the freight railway and South Street to the south, and the Kwinana Freeway to the west. Its boundaries include the suburbs of Parkwood, Riverton, Shelley, Willetton, Bull Creek and the Canning Vale industrial area and markets.

The 2007 redistribution, which took effect at the 2008 election, resulted in the seat losing Ferndale in the northeast and eastern Leeming in the southwest, while gaining the unpopulated Canning Vale industrial area.

== Members for Riverton ==
| Member | Party | Term |
|---|---|---|
| Graham Kierath | Liberal | 1989–2001 |
| Tony McRae | Labor | 2001–2008 |
| Mike Nahan | Liberal | 2008–2021 |
| Jags Krishnan | Labor | 2021–present |

== Election results ==
2025 Western Australian state election: Riverton
| Party | Candidate | Votes | % | ±% |
|---|---|---|---|---|
| Labor | Jags Krishnan | 12,005 | 43.2 | −8.9 |
| Liberal | Amanda Spencer-Teo | 10,121 | 36.4 | +3.7 |
| Greens | Tim Hall | 3,224 | 11.6 | +4.2 |
| Christians | Joan Lee Ng | 1,551 | 5.6 | +1.7 |
| One Nation | Flint Adarne | 893 | 3.2 | +3.0 |
| Total formal votes | | 27,794 | 96.9 | −0.5 |
| Informal votes | | 891 | 3.1 | +0.5 |
| Turnout | | 28,685 | 91.8 | +4.2 |
Two-party-preferred result
| Labor | Jags Krishnan | 15,064 | 54.2 | −6.6 |
| Liberal | Amanda Spencer-Teo | 12,714 | 45.8 | +6.6 |
| Labor hold | | Swing | −6.6 | |
