= Electoral results for the district of Darling Range =

Western Australian district election results

This is a list of electoral results for the electoral district of Darling Range in Western Australian state elections.

== Members for Darling Range ==
Darling Range (1950–1974)
Member	Term	Party
Ray Owen	Country	1950–1962
Ken Dunn	Liberal Country League	1962–1968
Ken Dunn	Liberal	1968–1971
Ian Thompson	Liberal	1971–1974
Darling Range (1977–present)
Member	Term	Party
George Spriggs	Liberal	1977–1987
Bob Greig	Liberal	1987–1989
Ian Thompson	Liberal	1989–1990
Ian Thompson	Independent	1990–1993
John Day	Liberal	1993–2008
Tony Simpson	Liberal	2008–2017
Barry Urban	Labor	2017
Barry Urban	Independent	2017–2018
Alyssa Hayden	Liberal	2018–2021
Hugh Jones	Labor	2021–present

== Election results ==
=== Elections in the 2020s ===
2025 Western Australian state election: Darling Range
Party	Candidate	Votes	%	±%
Labor	Hugh Jones	10,983	40.9	−16.0
Liberal	Paul Mansfield	6,462	24.1	−3.5
One Nation	Liam John Heerema	2,174	8.1	+6.0
Greens	Dominic Firmager	2,151	8.0	+3.6
Christians	Quintin Kleyn	1,540	5.7	+1.1
National	Morgan Byas	1,522	5.7	+5.7
Legalise Cannabis	Robert Peters	1,331	5.0	+5.0
Shooters, Fishers, Farmers	Ian Blevin	665	2.5	+2.5
Total formal votes		26,828	95.3	−1.1
Informal votes		1,309	4.7	+1.1
Turnout		28,137	87.3	+5.8
Two-party-preferred result
Labor	Hugh Jones	14,765	55.1	−9.0
Liberal	Paul Mansfield	12,046	44.9	+9.0
Labor hold		Swing	−9.0	

2021 Western Australian state election: Darling Range
Party	Candidate	Votes	%	±%
Labor	Hugh Jones	14,854	56.0	+14.2
Liberal	Alyssa Hayden	7,494	28.3	−1.7
Greens	Matthew Lacey	1,254	4.7	−2.9
Christians	Eric Eikelboom	1,230	4.6	0.0
One Nation	Anthony Fenech	524	2.0	−6.8
No Mandatory Vaccination	Judith Congrene	406	1.5	+1.5
Liberal Democrats	Matthew Thompson	335	1.3	+1.3
Western Australia	Brett Clarke	187	0.7	+0.7
Independent	Dean Strautins	157	0.6	+0.6
WAxit	Alan Svilicic	65	0.2	−1.0
Total formal votes		26,506	96.4	+1.3
Informal votes		981	3.6	−1.3
Turnout		27,487	88.2	+1.0
Two-party-preferred result
Labor	Hugh Jones	16,822	63.5	+7.5
Liberal	Alyssa Hayden	9,668	36.5	−7.5
Labor hold		Swing	+7.5	

=== Elections in the 2010s ===
2018 Darling Range state by-election
Party	Candidate	Votes	%	±%
Liberal	Alyssa Hayden	8,418	34.5	+4.1
Labor	Tania Lawrence	7,809	32.0	−9.5
One Nation	Rod Caddies	1,894	7.8	−1.0
Greens	Anthony Pyle	1,427	5.8	−1.8
Western Australia	Russell Goodrick	1,413	5.8	+5.8
Christians	Eric Eikelboom	1,145	4.7	+0.3
Shooters, Fishers, Farmers	Stuart Ostle	1,112	4.6	+0.3
Animal Justice	Jehni Thomas-Wurth	803	3.3	+3.3
Independent	Doug Shaw	146	0.6	+0.6
Independent	George O'Byrne	137	0.5	+0.5
Fluoride Free WA	John Watt	106	0.4	+0.4
Total formal votes		24,410	95.6	+0.5
Informal votes		1,126	4.4	−0.5
Turnout		25,536	78.4	−11.1
Two-party-preferred result
Liberal	Alyssa Hayden	13,039	53.5	+9.3
Labor	Tania Lawrence	11,331	46.5	−9.3
Liberal gain from Labor		Swing	+9.3	

2017 Western Australian state election: Darling Range
Party	Candidate	Votes	%	±%
Labor	Barry Urban	11,012	41.5	+12.5
Liberal	Tony Simpson	8,056	30.4	−25.2
One Nation	Sharon Polgar	2,313	8.7	+8.7
Greens	Iwan Boskamp	2,033	7.7	−1.8
Christians	Derek Bruning	1,174	4.4	−0.5
Shooters, Fishers, Farmers	Stuart Ostle	1,123	4.2	+4.2
Micro Business	Craig Ballinger	317	1.2	+1.2
Flux the System!	Chris Barker	194	0.7	+0.7
Liberal Democrats	Jake McCoull	163	0.6	+0.6
Independent	Manamal Froumis	134	0.5	+0.5
Total formal votes		26,519	95.1	+1.5
Informal votes		1,357	4.9	−1.5
Turnout		27,876	89.5	+6.5
Two-party-preferred result
Labor	Barry Urban	14,788	55.8	+18.9
Liberal	Tony Simpson	11,712	44.2	−18.9
Labor gain from Liberal		Swing	+18.9	

2013 Western Australian state election: Darling Range
Party	Candidate	Votes	%	±%
Liberal	Tony Simpson	13,454	57.9	+9.7
Labor	Barry Urban	6,494	27.9	–5.6
Greens	Denise Hardie	2,144	9.2	–3.9
Christians	Madeleine Goiran	1,154	5.0	–0.2
Total formal votes		23,246	93.8	−0.8
Informal votes		1,539	6.2	+0.8
Turnout		24,785	91.7	
Two-party-preferred result
Liberal	Tony Simpson	15,178	65.3	+8.3
Labor	Barry Urban	8,065	34.7	–8.3
Liberal hold		Swing	+8.3	

=== Elections in the 2000s ===
2008 Western Australian state election: Darling Range
Party	Candidate	Votes	%	±%
Liberal	Tony Simpson	9513	46.80	+5.9
Labor	Lisa Griffiths	6,893	33.91	−7.7
Greens	Denise Hardie	2,913	14.33	+7.3
Christian Democrats	Rachel Cabrera	1,010	4.97	+1.3
Total formal votes		20,329	94.54	−1.08
Informal votes		1,173	5.46	+1.08
Turnout		21,502	89.32	−2.95
Two-party-preferred result
Liberal	Tony Simpson	11,292	55.6	+6.3
Labor	Lisa Griffiths	9,030	44.4	−6.3
Liberal gain from Labor		Swing	+6.3	

2005 Western Australian state election: Darling Range
Party	Candidate	Votes	%	±%
Liberal	John Day	11,994	46.3	+10.0
Labor	Geoff Stallard	9,768	37.7	+6.5
Greens	Margo Beilby	1,843	7.1	−2.0
Christian Democrats	Rob Merrells	930	3.6	+3.0
Family First	Matthew Lague	765	3.0	+3.0
One Nation	Sam Dacheff	616	2.4	−7.7
Total formal votes		25,916	95.6	−0.4
Informal votes		1,188	4.4	+0.4
Turnout		27,104	92.3	
Two-party-preferred result
Liberal	John Day	13,759	53.1	+2.5
Labor	Geoff Stallard	12,143	46.9	−2.5
Liberal hold		Swing	+2.5	

2001 Western Australian state election: Darling Range
Party	Candidate	Votes	%	±%
Liberal	John Day	8,274	36.1	−18.8
Labor	Geoff Stallard	7,231	31.5	+4.0
Liberals for Forests	Frank Lindsey	2,381	10.4	+10.4
One Nation	Tom Greig	2,248	9.8	+9.8
Greens	Cathrine Hall	1,874	8.2	−0.4
Democrats	Gail Kelly	926	4.0	−5.0
Total formal votes		22,934	95.9	+0.7
Informal votes		978	4.1	−0.7
Turnout		23,912	92.7	
Two-party-preferred result
Liberal	John Day	11,417	50.3	−12.6
Labor	Geoff Stallard	11,280	49.7	+12.6
Liberal hold		Swing	−12.6	

=== Elections in the 1990s ===
1996 Western Australian state election: Darling Range
Party	Candidate	Votes	%	±%
Liberal	John Day	11,711	54.9	+2.5
Labor	Geoff Stallard	5,876	27.5	−0.7
Democrats	Gail Kelly	1,923	9.0	+7.8
Greens	Stewart Jackson	1,830	8.6	+3.2
Total formal votes		21,340	95.2	−0.8
Informal votes		1,066	4.8	+0.8
Turnout		22,406	91.8	
Two-party-preferred result
Liberal	John Day	13,390	62.9	−0.5
Labor	Geoff Stallard	7,912	37.1	+0.5
Liberal hold		Swing	−0.5	

1993 Western Australian state election: Darling Range
Party	Candidate	Votes	%	±%
Liberal	John Day	9,775	53.8	−7.3
Labor	James Christie	3,771	20.8	−8.7
Independent	Wiebe Tielman	1,846	10.2	+10.2
Greens	Janet Taciak	986	5.4	+5.4
Independent	Peter Marjoram	834	4.6	+4.6
Independent	Maura Howlett	557	3.1	+3.1
Democrats	Peter Lambert	386	2.1	+2.1
Total formal votes		18,155	95.9	+1.6
Informal votes		770	4.1	−1.6
Turnout		18,925	93.9	+2.4
Two-party-preferred result
Liberal	John Day	12,397	68.3	+0.6
Labor	James Christie	5,758	31.7	−0.6
Liberal hold		Swing	+0.6	

=== Elections in the 1980s ===
1989 Western Australian state election: Darling Range
Party	Candidate	Votes	%	±%
Liberal	Ian Thompson	10,373	61.1	+2.5
Labor	Maura Howlett	4,999	29.5	−11.9
Grey Power	Eric Tommey	1,594	9.4	+9.4
Total formal votes		16,966	94.3	
Informal votes		1,026	5.7	
Turnout		17,992	91.5	
Two-party-preferred result
Liberal	Ian Thompson	11,492	67.7	+9.1
Labor	Maura Howlett	5,474	32.3	−9.1
Liberal hold		Swing	+9.1	

1987 Darling Range state by-election
Party	Candidate	Votes	%	±%
Liberal	Bob Greig	5,637	65.1	+12.8
Labor	Douglas Poynton	2,359	27.3	−12.5
Democrats	Jean Ritter	662	7.6	−0.3
Total formal votes		8,658	97.4	+0.1
Informal votes		229	2.6	−0.1
Turnout		8,887	78.6	−13.8
Liberal hold		Swing	N/A	

- Preferences were not distributed.

1986 Western Australian state election: Darling Range
Party	Candidate	Votes	%	±%
Liberal	George Spriggs	5,116	52.3	−4.3
Labor	William McAtee	3,891	39.8	−3.6
Democrats	Richard Jeffreys	768	7.9	+7.9
Total formal votes		9,775	97.3	−0.3
Informal votes		267	2.7	+0.3
Turnout		10,042	92.4	+3.0
Two-party-preferred result
Liberal	George Spriggs	5,494	56.2	−0.4
Labor	William McAtee	4,281	43.8	+0.4
Liberal hold		Swing	−0.4	

1983 Western Australian state election: Darling Range
Party	Candidate	Votes	%	±%
Liberal	George Spriggs	4,419	56.6	
Labor	Reginald Howard-Smith	3,391	43.4	
Total formal votes		7,810	97.6	
Informal votes		191	2.4	
Turnout		8,001	89.4	
Liberal hold		Swing		

1980 Western Australian state election: Darling Range
Party	Candidate	Votes	%	±%
Liberal	George Spriggs	4,019	54.2	−9.8
Labor	William O'Brien	2,390	32.2	−3.8
Democrats	Eric Synnerdahl	1,010	13.6	+13.6
Turnout		7,419	96.3	+0.7
Informal votes		283	3.7	−0.7
Turnout		7,702	88.4	−1.8
Two-party-preferred result
Liberal	George Spriggs	4,524	61.0	−3.0
Labor	William O'Brien	2,895	39.0	+3.0
Liberal hold		Swing	−3.0	

=== Elections in the 1970s ===
1977 Western Australian state election: Darling Range
Party	Candidate	Votes	%	±%
Liberal	George Spriggs	4,092	64.0	
Labor	William O'Brien	2,298	36.0	
Total formal votes		6,390	95.6	
Informal votes		291	4.4	
Turnout		6,681	90.2	
Liberal hold		Swing		

1971 Western Australian state election: Darling Range
Party	Candidate	Votes	%	±%
Liberal	Ian Thompson	3,500	38.2	−14.5
Labor	Tom Howard	3,275	35.8	+4.5
Independent	Robert Ravine	891	9.7	+9.7
Country	Walter Davey	716	7.8	−8.3
Democratic Labor	Albert Ots	390	4.3	+4.3
Independent	Percy Seaton	381	4.2	+4.2
Total formal votes		9,153	96.2	+0.6
Informal votes		363	3.8	−0.6
Turnout		9,516	92.5	−2.8
Two-party-preferred result
Liberal	Ian Thompson	4,848	53.0	−13.2
Labor	Tom Howard	4,305	47.0	+13.2
Liberal hold		Swing	−13.2	

=== Elections in the 1960s ===
1968 Western Australian state election: Darling Range
Party	Candidate	Votes	%	±%
Liberal and Country	Ken Dunn	3,293	52.7	
Labor	Alick Smith	1,952	31.3	
Country	George Spriggs	861	13.8	
Country	Daniel Varney	141	2.3	
Total formal votes		6,247	95.6	
Informal votes		286	4.4	
Turnout		6,533	95.3	
Two-party-preferred result
Liberal and Country	Ken Dunn	4,138	66.2	
Labor	Alick Smith	2,109	33.8	
Liberal and Country hold		Swing		

1965 Western Australian state election: Darling Range
Party	Candidate	Votes	%	±%
Liberal and Country	Ken Dunn	2,635	41.6	+8.7
Labor	Jack Metcalfe	1,927	30.4	−3.9
Country	Ray Owen	1,768	27.9	−5.0
Total formal votes		6,330	97.9	−0.3
Informal votes		137	2.1	+0.3
Turnout		6,467	92.9	−0.5
Two-party-preferred result
Liberal and Country	Ken Dunn	3,857	60.9	+2.3
Labor	Jack Metcalfe	2,473	39.1	−2.3
Liberal and Country hold		Swing	+2.3	

1962 Darling Range state by-election
Party	Candidate	Votes	%	±%
Labor	Jack Metcalfe	1,843	33.7	−0.6
Liberal and Country	Ken Dunn	1,820	33.3	+0.4
Country	Ray Owen	1,805	33.0	+0.1
Total formal votes		5,468	98.9	+0.7
Informal votes		63	1.1	−0.7
Turnout		5,531	88.2	−5.2
Two-party-preferred result
Liberal and Country	Ken Dunn	3,001	54.9	−3.7
Labor	Jack Metcalfe	2,467	45.1	+3.7
Liberal and Country hold		Swing	−3.7	

1962 Western Australian state election: Darling Range
Party	Candidate	Votes	%	±%
Labor	Jack Metcalfe	1,969	34.3	
Liberal and Country	Ken Dunn	1,890	32.9	
Country	Ray Owen	1,889	32.9	
Total formal votes		5,748	98.2	
Informal votes		108	1.8	
Turnout		5,856	93.4	
Two-party-preferred result
Liberal and Country	Ken Dunn	3,367	58.6	
Labor	Jack Metcalfe	2,381	41.4	
Liberal and Country gain from Country		Swing		

=== Elections in the 1950s ===
1959 Western Australian state election: Darling Range
Party	Candidate	Votes	%	±%
Country	Ray Owen	1,799	38.8	−61.2
Liberal and Country	John Kostera	1,389	30.0	+30.0
Labor	Henry Harris	1,211	26.1	+26.1
Democratic Labor	Michael Coyne	236	5.1	+5.1
Total formal votes		4,635	98.0	
Informal votes		94	2.0	
Turnout		4,729	91.5	
Two-candidate-preferred result
Country	Ray Owen	2,803	60.5	−39.5
Liberal and Country	John Kostera	1,832	39.5	+39.5
Country hold		Swing	N/A	

1956 Western Australian state election: Darling Range
Party	Candidate	Votes	%	±%
Country	Ray Owen	unopposed		
Country hold		Swing		

1953 Western Australian state election: Darling Range
Party	Candidate	Votes	%	±%
Country	Ray Owen	2,684	52.8	+25.7
Labor	John Rolinson	1,805	35.5	+9.2
Independent Liberal	Herbert Small	592	11.6	+11.6
Total formal votes		5,081	97.5	−0.4
Informal votes		132	2.5	+0.4
Turnout		5,213	91.6	−0.2
Two-party-preferred result
Country	Ray Owen		61.0	
Labor	John Rolinson		39.0	
Country hold		Swing	N/A	

- Two party preferred vote was estimated.

1950 Western Australian state election: Darling Range
Party	Candidate	Votes	%	±%
Liberal and Country	Colin Cameron	1,696	35.8	
Country	Ray Owen	1,284	27.1	
Labor	John Rolinson	1,246	26.3	
Country	Frederick Schoch	509	10.7	
Total formal votes		4,735	97.9	
Informal votes		101	2.1	
Turnout		4,836	91.8	
Two-candidate-preferred result
Country	Ray Owen	2,524	53.3	
Liberal and Country	Colin Cameron	2,211	46.7	
Country hold		Swing		
