= Candidates of the 2017 Western Australian state election =

This is a list of candidates for the 2017 Western Australian state election. The election was held on 11 March 2017.

== Redistribution and seat changes ==
- A redistribution was completed in 2015. The most significant changes were:
  - The Liberal-held seats of Alfred Cove and Ocean Reef were renamed Bicton and Burns Beach respectively.
  - The Labor-held seat of Gosnells was renamed Thornlie.
  - The Liberal-held seat of Eyre and the National-held seat of Wagin were replaced by the notionally National seat of Roe, while a new notionally Labor seat, Baldivis, was created.
  - The Labor-held seats of Collie-Preston and West Swan became notionally Liberal.
- As a result of the redistribution:
  - Alfred Cove MLA Dean Nalder (Liberal) contested Bateman, while Bateman MLA Matt Taylor (Liberal) contested Bicton.
  - Eyre MLA Graham Jacobs (Liberal) contested Roe.
  - Gosnells MLA Chris Tallentire (Labor) contested Thornlie.
  - Ocean Reef MLA Albert Jacob (Liberal) contested Burns Beach.
- A number of MLCs contested Assembly seats:
  - Agricultural Nationals MLC Paul Brown contested Geraldton.
  - East Metropolitan Labor MLC Amber-Jade Sanderson contested Morley.
  - North Metropolitan Liberal MLC Peter Katsambanis contested Hillarys.

== Retiring MPs ==
=== Liberal ===
- John Castrilli MLA (Bunbury) – announced 14 March 2016
- Kim Hames MLA (Dawesville) – announced 2 August 2014
- Liz Behjat MLC (North Metropolitan) – lost preselection
- Barry House MLC (South West Region) – announced 27 October 2015

=== National ===
- Wendy Duncan MLA (Kalgoorlie) – announced 4 December 2015
- Terry Waldron MLA (Wagin) – announced 25 November 2014

== Legislative Assembly ==
Incumbent members are shown in bold text. Successful candidates are highlighted in the relevant colour.

Electorate	Held by	Labor candidate	Liberal candidate	National candidate	Greens candidate	One Nation candidate	Other candidates
Albany	Labor	**Peter Watson**	Greg Stocks	Robert Sutton	David Rastrick	Anthony Griffiths	Ian 't Hart (AC)
Armadale	Labor	**Tony Buti**	Wendy Jeffery		Anthony Pyle		Edward Flaherty (MBP); Cameron Huynh (Ind); Nitasha Naidu (AC)
Balcatta	Liberal	David Michael	**Chris Hatton**		Nicole Harvey		Keith McEncroe (AC); Mile Nasteski (MBP); Richard Tait (LDP)
Baldivis	Labor	Reece Whitby	Malcolm George		Christine Fegebank	John Zurakowski	Craig Hamersley (Ind); Yvette Holmes (AC); Prabhpreet Makkar (MBP); Kath Summers (Ind); Matt Whitfield (Ind)
Bassendean	Labor	**Dave Kelly**	Jim Seth		Sarah Quinton		Graeme Martin (MBP); Paul Mewhor (AC)
Bateman	Liberal	Tomas Fitzgerald	**Dean Nalder**		Adie Wilmot	Michelle Meyers	Adrian Arnold (JMWA); Don Huggins (AC); Jonathan Masih (MBP)
Belmont	Liberal	Cassie Rowe	**Glenys Godfrey**		Bhuwan Khadka	Julie Mitchell	Brigit Anderson (AJP); Ian Blevin (SFFP); Sue Fraser (AC); Miral Soboh (MBP)
Bicton	Liberal	Lisa O'Malley	**Matt Taylor**		Louise Dickmann		Steve Kepert (Ind); Richard Korfanty (MBP); Colleen Saporita (AJP); Stephen Wardell-Johnson (AC)
Bunbury	Liberal	Don Punch	Ian Morison	James Hayward	Michael Baldock	Sam Brown	Aldo Del Popolo (MBP); Bernie Masters (SFFP); Anthony Shannon (Flux)
Burns Beach	Liberal	Mark Folkard	**Albert Jacob**		Mark Cooper		Rudolph Crous (AC); Sandy Culum-Buzak (MBP); Joy Drennan (FFP); Carl Maddox (JMWA)
Butler	Labor	**John Quigley**	Linda Aitken		Tom Webster	Susan Hoddinott	Ryno Joubert (AC); Ron Smith (JMWA); Ola Sommer (MBP); Jan van Niekerk (SFFP)
Cannington	Labor	**Bill Johnston**	Jesse Jacobs		Elliot Thompson	Rozane Bezuidenhout	Zena Rihani (MBP); Gary Smith (AC); Mohsin Virk (-)
Carine	Liberal	Andrew Owens	**Tony Krsticevic**		Nadine Reeves-Hennessey	Terry Popham	Annette Almond (JMWA); Ray Moran (AC); Athan Tsirigotis (MBP)
Central Wheatbelt	National	Gary Templeman	Bill Crabtree	**Mia Davies**	Audrey Foote	Shaun Reid	Estelle Gom (Ind); Dennis Pease (AC); Diff Reynders (SFFP)
Churchlands	Liberal	Paul Lilburne	**Sean L'Estrange**		Joanna Gurak		Jim Bivoltsis (Ind); Jack Garber (JMWA); Daljeet Gill (MBP); Paul Phillips (AC)
Cockburn	Labor	**Fran Logan**	Lavin Raja-Yogam		Shannon Hewitt		Connor McHugh (MBP); Steve Portelli (Ind); Edward Roose (AC); Erinn Stanfield (Flux)
Collie-Preston	Liberal	**Mick Murray**	Elysia Harverson	Monique Warnock	Gordon Tayler	David Miller	Don Hyland (Ind); Louie Scibilia (Ind); Clinton Thomas (SFFP)
Cottesloe	Liberal	Caitlin Collins	**Colin Barnett**		Greg Boland		Riaan Groenewald (AC); Alida Lancee (Ind); Dmitry Malov (Ind); Nicole Poppas (MBP); Michael Watson (-)
Darling Range	Liberal	Barry Urban	**Tony Simpson**		Iwan Boskamp	Sharon Polgar	Craig Ballinger (MBP); Chris Barker (Flux); Derek Bruning (AC); Manamal Froumis (Ind); Jake McCoull (LDP); Stuart Ostle (SFFP)
Dawesville	Liberal	Adam Woodage	Zak Kirkup	Luke Pilkington	Aeron Blundell-Camden	Lawrence Shave	Russell McCarthy (SFFP); Dave Schumacher (Ind); Liam Spence (Flux); Alan Svilicic (MBP)
Forrestfield	Liberal	Stephen Price	**Nathan Morton**		Eugene Marshall	Jenny Bennett	Brett Crook (AC); Ashley Jago (AJP); M. Shahalam (MBP)
Fremantle	Labor	**Simone McGurk**	Hayden Shenton		Martin Spencer	Warren Duffy	Andrew Ayre (MBP); Chris Jenkins (SA); Janetia Knapp (JMWA); Gabrielle van der Linde (AC)
Geraldton	Liberal	Lara Dalton	**Ian Blayney**	Paul Brown	Paul Connolly	Wayne Martin	David Caudwell (SFFP); Greg Hall (AC); Victor Tanti (Ind)
Girrawheen	Labor	**Margaret Quirk**	Dame Krcoski		Mushfiq Shah		Che Tam Nguyen (FFP); David Phillips (AC); Raymond Roach (SFFP); Sahaj Singh (MBP)
Hillarys	Liberal	Teresa Ritchie	Peter Katsambanis		Louahna Lloyd		**Rob Johnson** (Ind); Elisabete Robinson (AC)
Jandakot	Liberal	Yaz Mubarakai	**Joe Francis**		Dorinda Cox	John Murphy	Francesca Gobbert (AJP); Sat Samra (MBP); Warnar Spyker (AC)
Joondalup	Liberal	Emily Hamilton	**Jan Norberger**		Lisa Webb		Brian Brightman (Ind); Nicholas Hart (FFP); Rex Host (AC); Aaron Malloy (JMWA); Peter Martin (MBP)
Kalamunda	Liberal	Matthew Hughes	**John Day**		Lee-Anne Miles	Ray Gould (resigned)	Murray Bowyer (JMWA); Evazelia Colyvas (MBP); Brady Williams (AC)
Kalgoorlie	National	Darren Forster	Kyran O'Donnell	Tony Crook	Jacqueline Spurling	Richard Bolton	James Erwin (Flux); Mike Lucas (SFFP)
Kimberley	Labor	**Josie Farrer**	Warren Greatorex	Rob Houston	Liz Vaughan	Keith Wright	Ryan Albrey (Flux); Graham Chapman (Ind); Kai Jones (Ind)
Kingsley	Liberal	Jessica Stojkovski	**Andrea Mitchell**		Matt Ward		Gilbert Burnside (AC); John McNair (JMWA); Dominic Staltari (MBP)
Kwinana	Labor	**Roger Cook**	Bianca Talbot		Jody Freeman	Tim Taylor	Joshua Hyde (MBP); Eleanor Morel (AC)
Mandurah	Labor	**David Templeman**	Lynne Rowlands	Jason Turner	Jodie Moffat	Doug Shaw	Paul Batsioudis (MBP); Seb Carrie-Wilson (Flux)
Maylands	Labor	**Lisa Baker**	Amanda Madden		Caroline Perks		Benny Fensome (MBP); Matt Kleyn (AC); Greg Smith (JMWA)
Midland	Labor	**Michelle Roberts**	Daniel Parasiliti		Matthew Biggs	Tony D'Angelo	John Biltoft (MBP); Trent Passmore (SFFP); Greg Ross (JMWA)
Mirrabooka	Labor	**Janine Freeman**	Lily Chen		Rafeif Ismail		Sareeta Doobree (MBP); Chukwudumebi Igbokwe (AC); Matueny Luke (Ind); Kim Mubarak (Ind)
Moore	National	Barni Norton	Darren Slyns	**Shane Love**	Peter Leam	Jim Kelly	Wes Porter (AC); Ross Williamson (SFFP)
Morley	Liberal	Amber-Jade Sanderson	**Ian Britza**		Anne-Marie Ricciardi		Nasim Boksmati (MBP); Lois Host (AC); Paul Longo (SFFP)
Mount Lawley	Liberal	Simon Millman	**Michael Sutherland**		Matt Roberts		Alexandra Farsalas (MBP); Kandi Revian (AJP); Janelle van Burgel (AC)
Murray-Wellington	Liberal	Robyn Clarke	**Murray Cowper**	Paul Gillett	Callum Burwood	Ross Slater	Mark McCall (SFFP); Daniel Radley (Flux)
Nedlands	Liberal	Penny Taylor	**Bill Marmion**		Daniel Grosso		Keith Ginbey (MBP); Andrew Mangano (JMWA); Christopher Shaw (AC)
North West Central	National	Shane Hill	Julee Westcott	**Vince Catania**	Carol Green	Dane Sorensen (disendorsed)	Sandy Davies (Ind); Adrian D'Cunha (Flux); Angela Hooper (MBP)
Perth	Liberal	John Carey	**Eleni Evangel**		Hannah Milligan		Ben Ballingall (Flux); Matt Hanson (AJP); Archie Hyde (MBP); Ken Lim (AC); Ian Molyneux (JMWA)
Pilbara	National	Kevin Michel	Mark Alchin	**Brendon Grylls**	Brent McKenna	David Archibald	Mark Dunn (Flux); Davyd Hooper (MBP); Fiona White-Hartig (SFFP)
Riverton	Liberal	Marion Boswell	**Mike Nahan**		Thor Kerr		Zeeshan Pasha (MBP); Susan Regnard (AC); Gavin Waugh (JMWA)
Rockingham	Labor	**Mark McGowan**	Wendy Baumann		James Mumme	James Omalley	Craig Buchanan (Ind); Mark Charles (MBP); Sylvia Stonehouse (AC)
Roe	National	Bradley Willis	**Graham Jacobs**	Peter Rundle	Simone McInnes	Eketerina Zacklova	Anthony Fels (-); Cathie Kelly (AC); Peter Stacey (SFFP)
Scarborough	Liberal	Tony Walker	**Liza Harvey**		Judith Cullity	Margaret Dodd (resigned)	Dan Bailey (MBP); Kevin Host (AC); Steven Pynt (JMWA)
South Perth	Liberal	Michael Voros	**John McGrath**		Mark Brogan		M. Francis (Ind); Fiona Reid (Ind); Jason St Martin (MBP); Rosemary Steineck (AC)
Southern River	Liberal	Terry Healy	**Peter Abetz**		Toni Pikos-Sallie		David Fishlock (LDP); Craig Harley (Ind); Steven Secker (Ind); Aman Singh (MBP); Ash Srivatstava (JMWA)
Swan Hills	Liberal	Jessica Shaw	**Frank Alban**		Evan Webb	Sandra Old	Danusha Bhowaniah (JMWA); Lucky Singh (MBP)
Thornlie	Labor	**Chris Tallentire**	Rob Coales		Donna McAleese	Sandy Baraiolo (disendorsed)	Sibel Bennett (MBP); Madeleine Goiran (AC); Gary Hammond (SFFP); Andrew van Dam (Flux)
Vasse	Liberal	Wes Hartley	**Libby Mettam**	Peter Gordon	Luke O'Connell		
Victoria Park	Labor	**Ben Wyatt**	Julian Jacobs		Ryan Quinn		Jennifer Noye (MBP); Mark Staer (AC)
Wanneroo	Liberal	Sabine Winton	**Paul Miles**		Robyn Treacy	Joe Darcy	Greg Macpherson (JMWA); Linley Pass (AC); Peter Rosengrave (MBP); Max Wilson (Ind)
Warnbro	Labor	**Paul Papalia**	Luke Muscedere		Jillian Cain	Alex Scholz	Samantha Figgins (MBP); Thomas Hunter (JMWA); Deonne Kingsford (AC)
Warren-Blackwood	National	Hugh Litson	Ross Woodhouse	**Terry Redman**	Andrew Huntley	Greg Moroney	Marc Deas (SFFP)
West Swan	Liberal	**Rita Saffioti**	Rod Henderson		Beth McMullan		James Lawrence (JMWA); Isaac Moran (AC); Trevor Ruwoldt (SFFP)
Willagee	Labor	**Peter Tinley**	Rebecca Aubrey		Felicity McGeorge		Corina Abraham (SA); Robin Hosking (AC); Paul Potter (MBP)

== Legislative Council ==
Six candidates were elected in each region. Incumbent members are shown in bold text. Tickets that elected at least one MLC are highlighted in the relevant colour. Successful candidates are identified by an asterisk (*).

=== Agricultural Region ===
The Labor Party was defending one seat. The Liberal Party was defending two seats. The National Party was defending two seats. The Shooters, Fishers and Farmers Party was defending one seat.

Labor candidates	Liberal candidates	National candidates	Greens candidates	One Nation candidates	SFF candidates
1. **Darren West***; 2. Laurie Graham*; 3. Carol Martin; 4. Luke Clarkson	1. **Jim Chown***; 2. Steve Martin; 3. **Brian Ellis**; 4. Chris Wilkins; 5. Alan McFarland	1. **Martin Aldridge***; 2. Colin de Grussa*; 3. Leigh Ballard; 4. Fred Block; 5. Steve Blyth; 6. David Kennedy	1. Ian James; 2. Dylan Copeland	1. Rod Caddies; 2. Craig McKinley; 3. Emma McKinley	1. **Rick Mazza***; 2. Bevan Steele; 3. Mal Kentish
Christians candidates	Family First candidates	Micro Business candidates	LDP candidates	Matheson candidates	Flux candidates
1. Trevor Young; 2. Les Holten	1. Murray Yarran; 2. Leighton Knoll	1. Dennis Jennings; 2. Petar Culum	1. Connor Whittle; 2. Stuart Hatch	1. Peter Swift; 2. Bruce Anderson	1. Lewis Freer; 2. Peter Turner
DSP candidates	Fluoride Free candidates	Group J candidates	Group M candidates	Group P candidates	Group Q candidates
1. Vince Radford; 2. Robert Tucker	1. Phillip Strahan; 2. Gillian Pearce	1. Alexander Reid; 2. Tim McMahon	1. Murray Fleeton; 2. Patrick Akkari	1. Brent Williamson; 2. Michael Prinz	1. N. Spada; 2. S. Demir
Group R candidates	Ungrouped candidates				
1. David Reed; 2. Lewis Butto	Graham Barrett-Lennard; Frank Hough				

=== East Metropolitan Region ===
The Labor Party was defending three seats. The Liberal Party was defending three seats.

Labor candidates	Liberal candidates	Greens candidates	One Nation candidates	SFF candidates	Christians candidates
1. **Alanna Clohesy***; 2. **Samantha Rowe***; 3. Matthew Swinbourn*; 4. Thomas French; 5. Reece Wheadon; 6. Lauren Cayoun	1. **Donna Faragher***; 2. **Alyssa Hayden**; 3. **Helen Morton**; 4. Christopher Tan; 5. Raymond Gianoli; 6. Joanna Collins	1. Tim Clifford*; 2. Sarah Nielsen-Harvey; 3. Robyn Walsh	1. Charles Smith*; 2. Chris Fernandez; 3. Lloyd McIntosh	1. Paul Pitaro; 2. Mitchell Wellstead; 3. Steve Denham	1. Jamie van Burgel; 2. Maryka Groenewald
Family First candidates	Micro Business candidates	LDP candidates	AJP candidates	Matheson candidates	Flux candidates
1. Simon Geddes; 2. Steve Fuhrmann	1. Kelvin White; 2. W. Ginbey	1. Neil Hamilton; 2. Todd Phillips	1. Talia Raphaely; 2. Nicole Arielli	1. Russell Goodrick; 2. Stephen Lau	1. Rob Redfearn; 2. Jim Taylor
DSP candidates	Fluoride Free candidates	Group B candidates	Group E candidates	Group J candidates	Group P candidates
1. Michael Zakrzewski; 2. Riley Burkett	1. John Watt; 2. Trevor McGowan	1. M. Lottering; 2. Stef Pienaar	1. Shawn Dhu; 2. Belinda Lange	1. Charday Williams; 2. Ben Devlin	1. Jayme Hewitt; 2. Natasha Forde
Ungrouped candidates					
Roger Cornish

=== Mining and Pastoral Region ===
The Labor Party was defending one seat. The Liberal Party was defending two seats. The National Party was defending two seats. The Greens were defending one seat.

Labor candidates	Liberal candidates	National candidates	Greens candidates	One Nation candidates	SFF candidates
1. **Stephen Dawson***; 2. Kyle McGinn*; 3. Peter Foster; 4. Christopher Mousley	1. **Ken Baston***; 2. **Mark Lewis**; 3. Barry Pound; 4. Jason Wells	1. **Jacqui Boydell***; 2. **Dave Grills**; 3. Gary Brown; 4. Judi Janes; 5. Adrian Hatwell; 6. Terry Fleeton	1. **Robin Chapple***; 2. Timothy Oliver	1. Robin Scott*; 2. Justin Keating; 3. Janine Varley	1. Stefan Colagiuri; 2. Shane Aylmore; 3. Kingsley Smith
Christians candidates	Family First candidates	Micro Business candidates	LDP candidates	Matheson candidates	Flux candidates
1. Grahame Gould; 2. Jacky Young	1. Ian Rose; 2. Bev Custers	1. Natasha Rogers; 2. Pritam Patil	1. Jared Neaves; 2. Marko Vasev	1. Sonya Matheson; 2. Paul Costanzo	1. Kai Shanks; 2. Melissa Taaffe
DSP candidates	Fluoride Free candidates	Group F candidates	Group G candidates	Group J candidates	Group N candidates
1. Amanda Klaj; 2. Joel Duffy	1. Anne Porter; 2. David Bauer	1. Paul Fitzgerald; 2. Nicholas Cukela	1. Atilla Ataman; 2. Tayla Stucke	1. Abed Raouf; 2. Billy Amesz	1. Angela Hyde; 2. Greg Gandossini
Group O candidates	Group S candidates	Ungrouped candidates			
1. Arihia Henry; 2. Pete Francis	1. Keith Mader; 2. Royce Normington	Julie Owen; Darby Renton			

=== North Metropolitan Region ===
The Labor Party was defending two seats. The Liberal Party was defending four seats.

Labor candidates	Liberal candidates	Greens candidates	One Nation candidates	SFF candidates	Christians candidates
1. Alannah MacTiernan*; 2. **Martin Pritchard***; 3. Kelly Shay; 4. Hannah Beazley; 5. **Laine McDonald**; 6. Hugh Nguyen	1. **Peter Collier***; 2. **Michael Mischin***; 3. Tjorn Sibma*; 4. Victoria Jackson; 5. Sandra Brewer; 6. Tim Walton	1. Alison Xamon*; 2. Samantha Jenkinson; 3. Ziggy Fatnowna	1. John Bombak; 2. Ian Hamilton	1. Paul Bedford; 2. Daniel Strijk	1. Dwight Randall; 2. Neil Fearis
Family First candidates	Micro Business candidates	LDP candidates	AJP candidates	Matheson candidates	Flux candidates
1. Henry Heng; 2. Lesley Croll	1. John Golawski; 2. Matt Golawski; 3. Mariah Bennington	1. Brian Murray; 2. John Ogilvie	1. Natasha Chakich; 2. Elizabeth McCasker	1. Julie Matheson; 2. Jane Boxall	1. Joshua van Ross; 2. Owen Merriman
DSP candidates	Fluoride Free candidates	Group A candidates	Group H candidates	Ungrouped candidates	
1. Tye Short; 2. Michael Kennedy	1. Steven Smith; 2. Clark Robertson	1. Raoul Smith; 2. Michael Carey	1. A. Albert; 2. Claire Norton	Michael Tucak; Derek Ammon; Joe Ruzzi	

=== South Metropolitan Region ===
The Labor Party was defending two seats. The Liberal Party was defending three seats. The Greens were defending one seat.

Labor candidates	Liberal candidates	Greens candidates	One Nation candidates	SFF candidates	Christians candidates
1. **Sue Ellery***; 2. **Kate Doust***; 3. Pierre Yang*; 4. Kelly McManus; 5. Vicky Burrows; 6. Dustin Rafferty	1. **Nick Goiran***; 2. **Simon O'Brien***; 3. **Phil Edman**; 4. Michelle Hofmann; 5. Lorraine Finlay; 6. Daryl Pranata	1. **Lynn MacLaren**; 2. Jordon Steele-John; 3. Nasrin Dehghani	1. Philip Scott; 2. Richard Eldridge; 3. Ekaterina Andreeva	1. Peter Raffaelli; 2. Wayne Higgs	1. Bob Burdett; 2. Carmen Burdett
Family First candidates	Micro Business candidates	LDP candidates	AJP candidates	Matheson candidates	Flux candidates
1. Nigel Irvine; 2. Cara Heng	1. Cam Tinley; 2. Andrew Middleton; 3. Len Dibben	1. Aaron Stonehouse*; 2. Angadjeet Sanghera	1. Katrina Love; 2. Ramona Janssen	1. Andrew Luobikis; 2. Angela Watson	1. Alexander Brownbill; 2. Keith Pomeroy
DSP candidates	Fluoride Free candidates	Socialist candidates	Group G candidates	Group I candidates	Group N candidates
1. Wilson Tucker; 2. Peita Alberti	1. Derek Rucki; 2. Nita Thakrar	1. Sam Wainwright; 2. Petrina Harley	1. Robert Cotterell; 2. Michelle Cotterell	1. Vito Matarazzo; 2. Yusuf Oruc	1. William Freeman; 2. Daksh Varma
Group O candidates	Group Q candidates	Ungrouped candidates			
1. Carol Adams; 2. Karen Vernon; 3. Luke Bolton; 4. Jonathan Ford	1. Rick Smith; 2. Adrian Snary	Laona Jones; Norm Heslington; Frank Brown; Rosemary Lorrimar; Tony Romano			

=== South West Region ===
The Labor Party was defending two seats. The Liberal Party was defending three seats, although sitting MLC Nigel Hallett was running for the Shooters, Fishers and Farmers Party. The National Party was defending one seat.

Labor candidates	Liberal candidates	National candidates	Greens candidates	One Nation candidates	SFF candidates
1. **Sally Talbot***; 2. **Adele Farina***; 3. John Mondy; 4. Barry Winmar; 5. Jessica Short	1. Steve Thomas*; 2. Wade De Campo; 3. **Robyn McSweeney**; 4. Tony Norment; 5. Heather Reid; 6. Douglas McLarty	1. **Colin Holt***; 2. Louise Kingston; 3. Bevan Eatts; 4. Kylie Kennaugh	1. Diane Evers*; 2. Hsien Harper	1. Colin Tincknell*; 2. Cameron Bartkowski; 3. Sean Butler	1. **Nigel Hallett**; 2. Craig Carbone; 3. Ray Hull
Christians candidates	Family First candidates	Micro Business candidates	LDP candidates	Matheson candidates	Flux candidates
1. Greg Spaanderman; 2. Rachael Dowdell	1. Linda Rose; 2. Dave Bolt	1. Jeff Casson; 2. Devinder Chinna	1. Nathan Dyson; 2. Damian Coletta	1. Stephen Phelan; 2. Blake Phelan	1. Daithí Gleeson; 2. Mark Bentley
AJP candidates	DSP candidates	Fluoride Free candidates	Group J candidates	Group Q candidates	Ungrouped candidates
1. Alicia Sutton; 2. Eric Gobbert	1. Brett Tucker; 2. Janet Wilson	1. Hayley Green; 2. John Vukovich	1. Tim Hartley; 2. Julio Pieraldi	1. Eric Thern; 2. Katrina De Ruyck	John Higgins; Zyggi Uchwal; Kyle Hammond
