= Members of the Western Australian Legislative Assembly, 2017–2021 =

This is a list of members of the Western Australian Legislative Assembly from 2017 to 2021.

== List of members ==
Name	Party	District	Term in office
Lisa Baker	Labor	Maylands	2008–2025
Colin Barnett ^{[1]}	Liberal	Cottesloe	1990–2018
Ian Blayney	Liberal/Independent/National ^{[3]}	Geraldton	2008–2021
Tony Buti	Labor	Armadale	2010–present
John Carey	Labor	Perth	2017–present
Vince Catania	National	North West Central	2008–2022
Robyn Clarke	Labor	Murray-Wellington	2017–2025
Roger Cook	Labor	Kwinana	2008–present
Mia Davies	National	Central Wheatbelt	2013–2025
Josie Farrer	Labor	Kimberley	2013–2021
Mark Folkard	Labor	Burns Beach	2017–present
Janine Freeman	Labor	Mirrabooka	2008–2021
Emily Hamilton	Labor	Joondalup	2017–present
Liza Harvey	Liberal	Scarborough	2008–2021
Alyssa Hayden ^{[2]}	Liberal	Darling Range	2018–2021
Terry Healy	Labor	Southern River	2017–present
David Honey ^{[1]}	Liberal	Cottesloe	2018–2025
Matthew Hughes	Labor	Kalamunda	2017–2025
Bill Johnston	Labor	Cannington	2008–2025
Peter Katsambanis	Liberal	Hillarys	2017–2021
Dave Kelly	Labor	Bassendean	2013–present
Zak Kirkup	Liberal	Dawesville	2017–2021
Tony Krsticevic	Liberal	Carine	2008–2021
Sean L'Estrange	Liberal	Churchlands	2013–2021
Fran Logan	Labor	Cockburn	2001–2021
Shane Love	National	Moore	2013–present
Bill Marmion	Liberal	Nedlands	2008–2021
Mark McGowan	Labor	Rockingham	1996–2023
John McGrath	Liberal	South Perth	2005–2021
Simone McGurk	Labor	Fremantle	2013–present
Libby Mettam	Liberal	Vasse	2014–present
David Michael	Labor	Balcatta	2017–present
Kevin Michel	Labor	Pilbara	2017–present
Simon Millman	Labor	Mount Lawley	2017–2025
Yaz Mubarakai	Labor	Jandakot	2017–present
Mick Murray	Labor	Collie-Preston	2001–2021
Mike Nahan	Liberal	Riverton	2008–2021
Dean Nalder	Liberal	Bateman	2013–2021
Kyran O'Donnell	Liberal	Kalgoorlie	2017–2021
Lisa O'Malley	Labor	Bicton	2017–present
Paul Papalia	Labor	Warnbro	2007–2026
Stephen Price	Labor	Forrestfield	2017–present
Don Punch	Labor	Bunbury	2017–present
John Quigley	Labor	Butler	2001–2025
Margaret Quirk	Labor	Girrawheen	2001–2025
Terry Redman	National	Warren-Blackwood	2005–2021
Michelle Roberts	Labor	Midland	1994–2025
Cassie Rowe	Labor	Belmont	2017–present
Peter Rundle	National	Roe	2017–present
Rita Saffioti	Labor	West Swan	2008–present
Amber-Jade Sanderson	Labor	Morley	2017–present
Jessica Shaw	Labor	Swan Hills	2017–2025
Jessica Stojkovski	Labor	Kingsley	2017–present
Chris Tallentire	Labor	Thornlie	2008–2025
David Templeman	Labor	Mandurah	2001–2025
Peter Tinley	Labor	Willagee	2009–2025
Barry Urban ^{[2]}	Labor/Independent	Darling Range	2017–2018
Peter Watson	Labor	Albany	2001–2021
Reece Whitby	Labor	Baldivis	2017–present
Sabine Winton	Labor	Wanneroo	2017–present
Ben Wyatt	Labor	Victoria Park	2006–2021

^{1} On 5 February 2018, the Liberal member for Cottesloe and former Premier, Colin Barnett, resigned. Liberal candidate David Honey was elected to replace him at the by-election for Cottesloe on 17 March 2018.
^{2} On 8 May 2018, the independent (former Labor) member for Darling Range, Barry Urban, resigned after the parliamentary procedures and privileges committee recommended his expulsion for "sustained and gross" contempt. Liberal candidate Alyssa Hayden was elected to replace him at the by-election for Darling Range on 23 June 2018.
^{3} On 24 July 2019, the member for Geraldton, Ian Blayney, resigned from the Liberal Party, and sat as an independent until his application to join the WA Nationals was approved on 17 August 2019.
