= Electoral results for the district of Burns Beach =

Western Australian district election results

This is a list of electoral results for the electoral district of Burns Beach in Western Australian state elections.

== Results ==
=== Elections in the 2020s ===
2021 Western Australian state election: Burns Beach
Party	Candidate	Votes	%	±%
Labor	Mark Folkard	17,193	70.1	+25.8
Liberal	Trish Botha	4,545	18.5	−19.0
Greens	Louis Marchant	1,355	5.5	−3.6
Christians	Graeme Offereins	625	2.5	+0.5
No Mandatory Vaccination	Meredith Campbell	585	2.4	+2.4
WAxit	Peter Rosengrave	223	0.9	−0.3
Total formal votes		24,526	96.4	+1.7
Informal votes		916	3.6	−1.7
Turnout		25,442	84.9	+1.3
Two-party-preferred result
Labor	Mark Folkard	18,849	76.9	+21.5
Liberal	Trish Botha	5,669	23.1	−21.5
Labor hold		Swing	+21.5	

=== Elections in the 2010s ===
2017 Western Australian state election: Burns Beach
Party	Candidate	Votes	%	±%
Labor	Mark Folkard	10,069	42.6	+10.0
Liberal	Albert Jacob	9,768	41.4	−15.7
Greens	Mark Cooper	2,060	8.7	+1.3
Family First	Joy Drennan	504	2.1	+1.3
Christians	Rudolph Crous	476	2.0	−0.0
Matheson for WA	Carl Maddox	471	2.0	+2.0
Micro Business	Sandy Culum-Buzak	266	1.1	+1.1
Total formal votes		23,614	94.7	+1.4
Informal votes		1,325	5.3	−1.4
Turnout		24,939	86.7	+4.1
Two-party-preferred result
Labor	Mark Folkard	12,400	52.5	+13.9
Liberal	Albert Jacob	11,207	47.5	−13.9
Labor gain from Liberal		Swing	+13.9	
