= Electoral results for the district of Helena =

Western Australian district election results

This is a list of electoral results for the Electoral district of Helena in Western Australian state elections.

== Members for Helena ==
Member	Party	Term
Gordon Hill	Labor	1983–1994
Rhonda Parker	Liberal	1994–1996

== Election results ==
=== Elections in the 1990s ===
1994 Helena state by-election
Party	Candidate	Votes	%	±%
Liberal	Rhonda Parker	8,185	46.2	+1.7
Labor	Joe Bullock	6,823	38.5	−4.9
Greens	Lorraine Johnston	1,256	7.1	+0.7
Independent	Mark Schneider	578	3.3	+3.3
Confederate Action	Alan Rossiter	366	2.1	+2.1
Independent	Ivan Talbot	310	1.8	+1.8
Democratic Republican	James Connolly	137	0.8	+0.8
	Alfred Bussell	78	0.4	+0.4
Total formal votes		17,733	96.1	+0.3
Informal votes		718	3.9	−0.3
Turnout		18,451	79.9	−14.6
Two-party-preferred result
Liberal	Rhonda Parker	9,237	52.1	+2.3
Labor	Joe Bullock	8,496	47.9	−2.3
Liberal gain from Labor		Swing	+2.3	

1993 Western Australian state election: Helena
Party	Candidate	Votes	%	±%
Liberal	Rhonda Parker	8,712	44.5	+3.5
Labor	Gordon Hill	8,480	43.4	−5.7
Greens	Christine Heal	1,260	6.4	+6.4
	Owen McGrath	1,110	5.7	+5.7
Total formal votes		19,562	95.8	+4.2
Informal votes		846	4.2	−4.2
Turnout		20,408	94.5	+2.3
Two-party-preferred result
Labor	Gordon Hill	9,820	50.2	−2.4
Liberal	Rhonda Parker	9,742	49.8	+2.4
Labor hold		Swing	−2.4	

=== Elections in the 1980s ===
1989 Western Australian state election: Helena
Party	Candidate	Votes	%	±%
Labor	Gordon Hill	8,738	49.1	−13.2
Liberal	Bob Greig	7,302	41.0	+3.3
Grey Power	Cecil Morris	1,393	7.8	+7.8
	Jack van Tongeren	375	2.1	+2.1
Total formal votes		17,808	91.6	
Informal votes		1,634	8.4	
Turnout		19,442	92.2	
Two-party-preferred result
Labor	Gordon Hill	9,358	52.6	−9.7
Liberal	Bob Greig	8,450	47.4	+9.7
Labor hold		Swing	−9.7	

1986 Western Australian state election: Helena
Party	Candidate	Votes	%	±%
Labor	Gordon Hill	12,688	64.5	+0.8
Liberal	Beryl Joines	6,986	35.5	−0.8
Total formal votes		19,674	97.1	−0.1
Informal votes		584	2.9	+0.1
Turnout		20,258	92.6	0.0
Labor hold		Swing	+0.8	

1983 Western Australian state election: Helena
Party	Candidate	Votes	%	±%
Labor	Gordon Hill	9,847	63.7	
Liberal	Marianne McCall	5,620	36.3	
Total formal votes		15,467	97.2	
Informal votes		447	2.8	
Turnout		15,914	92.6	
Labor hold		Swing		
