= Electoral results for the district of Serpentine-Jarrahdale =

Western Australian district election results

This is a list of electoral results for the Electoral district of Serpentine-Jarrahdale in Western Australian state elections.

== Members for Serpentine-Jarrahdale ==
Member	Party	Term
Tony Simpson	Liberal	2005–2008

== Election results ==
=== Elections in the 2000s ===
2005 Western Australian state election: Serpentine-Jarrahdale
Party	Candidate	Votes	%	±%
Liberal	Tony Simpson	10,762	43.9	+1.6
Labor	Daron Smith	9,992	40.7	+7.6
Greens	Win Dockter	1,326	5.4	−1.7
Christian Democrats	Michelle Verkerk	724	3.0	−0.1
Family First	Robert Pipes	702	2.9	+2.9
Independent	Fiona Cropper	540	2.2	+2.2
One Nation	Paul Nield	487	2.0	−7.5
Total formal votes		24,533	95.3	−0.8
Informal votes		1,199	4.7	+0.8
Turnout		25,732	92.2	
Two-party-preferred result
Liberal	Tony Simpson	12,530	51.2	−3.0
Labor	Daron Smith	11,961	48.8	+3.0
Liberal hold		Swing	−3.0	
