= Electoral results for the district of Mindarie =

Western Australian district election results

This is a list of electoral results for the electoral district of Mindarie in Western Australian state elections.

== Members for Mindarie ==
Member	Party	Term
John Quigley	Labor	2005–2013

== Election results ==
=== Elections in the 2020s ===
2025 Western Australian state election: Mindarie
Party	Candidate	Votes	%	±%
Labor	Mark Folkard	11,454	44.7	−26.6
Liberal	Paul Miles	6,606	25.8	+8.2
Greens	Scott McCarthy	2,418	9.4	+3.9
One Nation	John Burton	1,798	7.0	+7.0
Legalise Cannabis	Lee Hunt	1,325	5.2	+5.2
Animal Justice	Penelope Hall	913	3.6	+3.6
Christians	Patrick Thomas	820	3.2	+0.8
Shooters, Fishers, Farmers	Christian Mellon	306	1.2	+1.2
Total formal votes		25,640	95.3	−1.0
Informal votes		1,277	4.7	+1.0
Turnout		26,917	83.7	+3.1
Two-party-preferred result
Labor	Mark Folkard	15,710	61.3	−16.6
Liberal	Paul Miles	9,910	38.7	+16.6
Labor hold		Swing	−16.6	

=== Elections in the 2000s ===
2008 Western Australian state election: Mindarie
Party	Candidate	Votes	%	±%
Labor	John Quigley	9,288	48.6	−1.1
Liberal	Murray McLennan	6,839	35.8	−0.7
Greens	Johannes Herrmann	1,949	10.2	+4.2
Family First	Daniel Storey	644	3.4	+0.0
Christian Democrats	Amanda Varley	401	2.1	−0.1
Total formal votes		19,121	94.8	+0.4
Informal votes		1,052	5.2	−0.4
Turnout		20,173	85.4	
Two-party-preferred result
Labor	John Quigley	11,184	58.5	+1.6
Liberal	Murray McLennan	7,930	41.5	−1.6
Labor hold		Swing	+1.6	

2005 Western Australian state election: Mindarie
Party	Candidate	Votes	%	±%
Labor	John Quigley	10,122	47.6	+8.6
Liberal	Mike Lowry	8,516	40.0	+1.4
Greens	Miguel Castillo	1,404	6.6	−0.6
Family First	Doug Croker	779	3.7	+3.7
Christian Democrats	Pat Shea	466	2.2	+0.7
Total formal votes		21,287	95.1	−0.8
Informal votes		1,103	4.9	+0.8
Turnout		22,390	91.0	
Two-party-preferred result
Labor	John Quigley	11,491	54.0	+2.8
Liberal	Mike Lowry	9,788	46.0	−2.8
Labor hold		Swing	+2.8	
