= 2021 Western Australian state election =

- 13 March 2021

All 59 seats in the Western Australian Legislative Assembly and all 36 members in the Western Australian Legislative Council 30 Assembly seats are needed for a majority
- Opinion polls
- Turnout: 1,467,159 (85.46%) ▼3.15%

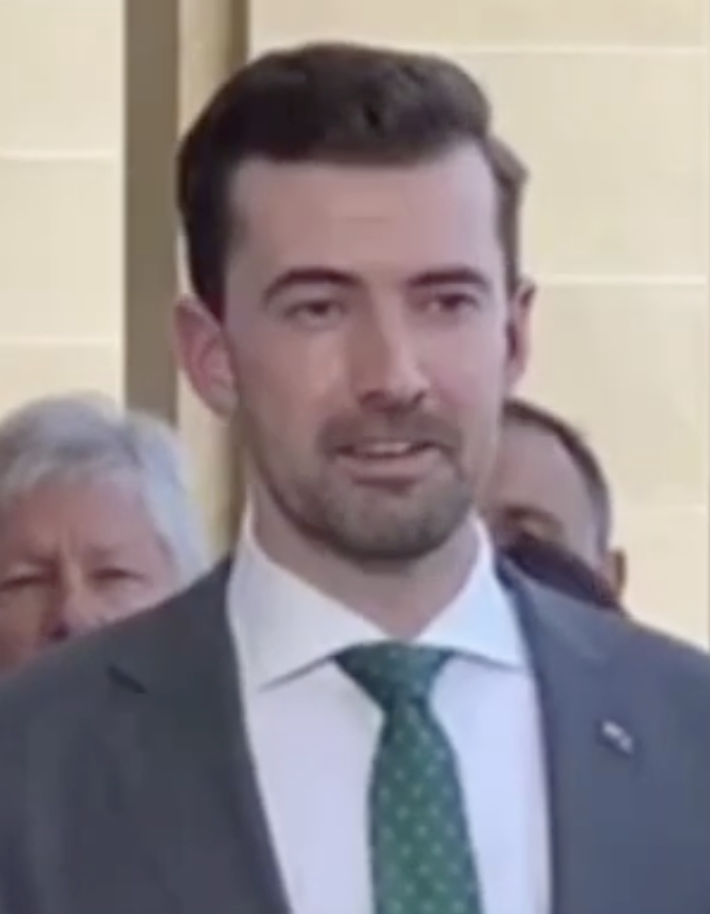
	First party	Second party	Third party
Leader	Mark McGowan	Mia Davies	Zak Kirkup
Party	Labor	National	Liberal
Leader since	23 January 2012	21 March 2017	24 November 2020
Leader's seat	Rockingham	Central Wheatbelt	Dawesville (lost seat)
Last election	41 seats	5 seats	13 seats
Seats before	40	6	13
Seats won	53	4	2
Seat change	▲12	▼1	▼11
Primary vote	846,116	56,448	300,796
Percentage	59.92%	4.00%	21.30%
Swing	▲17.70	▼1.40	▼9.90
TPP	69.70%		30.30%
TPP swing	▲14.10		▼14.10
- Winning margin by electorate.
Premier before election
Mark McGowan
Labor
Subsequent Premier
Mark McGowan
Labor

The 2021 Western Australian state election was held on Saturday 13 March to elect members to the Parliament of Western Australia, where all 59 seats in the Legislative Assembly and all 36 seats in the Legislative Council were up for election.

The incumbent Labor Government, led by Premier Mark McGowan, won a second consecutive four-year term in office in a historic landslide victory. Their primary challengers were the opposition Liberal Party, led by Opposition Leader Zak Kirkup, and the National Party, led by Mia Davies. Several minor parties also contested the election in the Assembly and Council.

ABC News psephologist Antony Green called the election for the Labor Party 42 minutes after the polls closed, with 0.7% of the vote counted. Labor won 53 seats in the Assembly, outdoing its previous record of 41 seats in 2017, whilst the Liberals suffered a wipeout loss and won only two seats, suffering a 14% two-party preferred swing. The Nationals claimed the four remaining seats and became the largest opposition party in the Assembly for the first time since the 1940s.

To date, the election is the most decisive result at any Australian state or federal election since Federation in terms of the percentage of lower house seats controlled by the governing party (89.8%), and two-party preferred margin (69.7%–30.3%). Labor's unprecedented victory extended to the Legislative Council, where the party claimed an absolute majority of the seats for the first time.

Candidates were elected to single-member seats in the Legislative Assembly via full-preferential instant-runoff voting. In the Legislative Council, six candidates were elected in each of the six electoral regions through the single transferable vote system with group voting tickets. The Western Australian Electoral Commission conducted the elections.

== Background ==
At the 2017 state election, Labor won 41 out of 59 seats in the Legislative Assembly. The party won with 55.5 per cent of the two-party-preferred vote, a swing of 12.8 per cent in their favour. While Labor had won a large victory in the lower house, they held a minority of 14 out of 36 seats in the Legislative Council. After the election, Mike Nahan and Mia Davies were made leader of the Liberal Party and the Nationals, respectively.

Two by-elections were held in the term, both in 2018: the first in March for Cottesloe, and the second in June for Darling Range. Cottesloe, a safe Liberal seat, was easily retained by the party in the absence of a Labor candidate. In Darling Range, Labor MP Barry Urban resigned after the Assembly's Procedure and Privileges Committee found that he had deliberately misled parliament over his education and military history. Liberal Alyssa Hayden, a former MLC who had lost her seat in 2017, won the resultant by-election. There was one defection in the term: Ian Blayney, Liberal MP for Geraldton, resigned from the party in July 2019, and joined the Nationals the following month.

Following Nahan's resignation as Liberal leader, Liza Harvey was elected unopposed as his replacement in June 2019. Harvey herself resigned in November 2020. The main candidates to replace her were Dean Nalder, a cabinet minister under Colin Barnett, and Zak Kirkup, the first-term MP for Dawesvillle. Nalder dropped out before the vote was to be held, making Kirkup the new Liberal leader. Aged 33, he was the youngest WA Liberal leader in its history at the time of his election.

The Western Australian government's hard border policy in response to COVID-19 was widely popular.

The COVID-19 pandemic was declared by the World Health Organisation in March 2020. As cases of COVID-19 appeared in the eastern states, the Western Australian government under Premier Mark McGowan introduced a hard border policy. The state's border was closed to the rest of the country on 5 April with only limited exceptions. On 17 July, the government required all travellers within Australia to receive pre-approval to visit Western Australia, and then quarantine themselves for fourteen days on their arrival. These border closures were widely popular among Western Australians. Although Harvey called for a reopening of the state's borders in May and June, the WA Liberals were mostly supportive of McGowan's handling of the pandemic.

Mining magnate Clive Palmer launched a legal challenge against Western Australia's hard border, alleging it violated section 92 of the Constitution of Australia, which stipulates free movement across the states of Australia. The federal attorney-general, Christian Porter, initially joined Palmer's case against the state on behalf of the Commonwealth, before withdrawing from the case in August. Palmer's challenge was heavily criticised: McGowan described him as "an enemy of the state", and the federal government's support of his legal case was seen to have hurt the state Liberals. The High Court ruled on the case in November 2020, finding in favour of the state government.

=== Electoral system ===
Western Australia has a bicameral parliament, consisting of a 59-member Legislative Assembly and a 36-member Legislative Council. The Assembly is elected from single-member districts using full preferential voting, while the Council uses multi-member districts: six in total, all electing six members through proportional representation. Group voting tickets were used for preference allocation in the Council.

A redistribution in 2019 had a relatively minor effect on electoral boundaries, with the district of Girrawheen being renamed to Landsdale.

== Electoral pendulums ==
=== Pre-election pendulum ===
This is a pre-election pendulum, taking into account the 2019 boundary redistribution. Estimated margins are calculated by Antony Green for the Western Australian Parliamentary Library. Retiring members are shown in italics.

Government seats
Marginal
Joondalup	Emily Hamilton	ALP	0.03
Kingsley	Jessica Stojkovski	ALP	1.2
Murray-Wellington	Robyn Clarke	ALP	1.7
Jandakot	Yaz Mubarakai	ALP	1.8
Pilbara	Kevin Michel	ALP v NAT	2.2
Kalamunda	Matthew Hughes	ALP	2.3
Bicton	Lisa O'Malley	ALP	3.6
Mount Lawley	Simon Millman	ALP	4.0
Burns Beach	Mark Folkard	ALP	5.4
Albany	Peter Watson	ALP v NAT	5.9
Fairly safe
Southern River	Terry Healy	ALP	7.9
Balcatta	David Michael	ALP	8.0
Wanneroo	Sabine Winton	ALP	8.6
Forrestfield	Stephen Price	ALP	9.4
Landsdale	Margaret Quirk	ALP	9.6
Safe
Bunbury	Don Punch	ALP	10.5
Belmont	Cassie Rowe	ALP	11.4
Swan Hills	Jessica Shaw	ALP	12.1
Morley	Amber-Jade Sanderson	ALP	12.3
Perth	John Carey	ALP	12.6
Midland	Michelle Roberts	ALP	12.8
Kimberley	Josie Farrer	ALP	13.1
Cockburn	Fran Logan	ALP	14.3
Collie-Preston	Mick Murray	ALP	14.7
Thornlie	Chris Tallentire	ALP	15.8
Baldivis	Reece Whitby	ALP	16.6
Victoria Park	Ben Wyatt	ALP	16.8
Cannington	Bill Johnston	ALP	17.6
Willagee	Peter Tinley	ALP	17.7
Maylands	Lisa Baker	ALP	17.9
Mandurah	David Templeman	ALP	18.0
West Swan	Rita Saffioti	ALP	18.4
Very safe
Butler	John Quigley	ALP	20.5
Kwinana	Roger Cook	ALP	20.7
Bassendean	Dave Kelly	ALP	21.6
Fremantle	Simone McGurk	ALP	23.0
Mirrabooka	Janine Freeman	ALP	23.3
Rockingham	Mark McGowan	ALP	23.5
Warnbro	Paul Papalia	ALP	23.7
Armadale	Tony Buti	ALP	25.2

Non-government seats
Marginal
Hillarys	Peter Katsambanis	LIB	0.4
Dawesville	Zak Kirkup	LIB	0.8
Darling Range	Alyssa Hayden	LIB (b/e)	3.5
Riverton	Mike Nahan	LIB	4.2
Scarborough	Liza Harvey	LIB	5.7
Fairly safe
Kalgoorlie	Kyran O'Donnell	LIB	6.2
South Perth	John McGrath	LIB	7.2
Bateman	Dean Nalder	LIB	7.8
Nedlands	Bill Marmion	LIB	8.0
Safe
Carine	Tony Krsticevic	LIB	10.2
Churchlands	Sean L'Estrange	LIB	11.7
Vasse	Libby Mettam	LIB	14.6
Very safe
Cottesloe	David Honey	LIB v GRN (b/e)	20.2
Crossbench seats
Geraldton	Ian Blayney (NAT)	LIB v ALP	1.3
North West Central	Vince Catania	NAT v ALP	10.1
Warren-Blackwood	Terry Redman	NAT v ALP	12.8
Moore	Shane Love	NAT v LIB	19.5
Central Wheatbelt	Mia Davies	NAT v ALP	22.2
Roe	Peter Rundle	NAT v LIB	25.9

=== Post-election pendulum ===
Government seats
Marginal
Churchlands	Christine Tonkin	ALP v LIB	0.8
Warren-Blackwood	Jane Kelsbie	ALP v NAT	1.3
Carine	Paul Lilburne	ALP v LIB	2.5
Nedlands	Katrina Stratton	ALP v LIB	2.8
Fairly safe
Bateman	Kim Giddens	ALP v LIB	6.7
Riverton	Jags Krishnan	ALP v LIB	9.0
Safe
South Perth	Geoff Baker	ALP v LIB	10.1
Scarborough	Stuart Aubrey	ALP v LIB	10.4
Geraldton	Lara Dalton	ALP v NAT	11.7
Kalamunda	Matthew Hughes	ALP v LIB	11.8
Kalgoorlie	Ali Kent	ALP v LIB	12.0
Darling Range	Hugh Jones	ALP v LIB	13.5
Albany	Rebecca Stephens	ALP v LIB	13.7
Dawesville	Lisa Munday	ALP v LIB	13.9
Bicton	Lisa O'Malley	ALP v LIB	15.6
Fremantle	Simone McGurk	ALP v GRN	15.8
Kingsley	Jessica Stojkovski	ALP v LIB	16.9
Murray-Wellington	Robyn Clarke	ALP v LIB	17.2
Hillarys	Caitlin Collins	ALP v LIB	19.0
Very safe
Pilbara	Kevin Michel	ALP v NAT	20.4
Jandakot	Yaz Mubarakai	ALP v LIB	21.0
Kimberley	Divina D'Anna	ALP v LIB	21.4
Mount Lawley	Simon Millman	ALP v LIB	21.6
Bunbury	Don Punch	ALP v LIB	22.5
Collie-Preston	Jodie Hanns	ALP v LIB	23.4
Joondalup	Emily Hamilton	ALP v LIB	24.7
Mandurah	David Templeman	ALP v LIB	25.2
Landsdale	Margaret Quirk	ALP v LIB	25.4
Forrestfield	Stephen Price	ALP v LIB	25.5
Midland	Michelle Roberts	ALP v LIB	25.5
Balcatta	David Michael	ALP v LIB	25.8
Cockburn	David Scaife	ALP v LIB	26.7
Burns Beach	Mark Folkard	ALP v LIB	26.9
Swan Hills	Jessica Shaw	ALP v LIB	27.1
Willagee	Peter Tinley	ALP v LIB	27.1
Victoria Park	Hannah Beazley	ALP v LIB	27.8
Wanneroo	Sabine Winton	ALP v LIB	28.4
Morley	Amber-Jade Sanderson	ALP v LIB	28.6
Belmont	Cassie Rowe	ALP v LIB	29.2
Maylands	Lisa Baker	ALP v LIB	29.3
Perth	John Carey	ALP v LIB	29.3
Cannington	Bill Johnston	ALP v LIB	30.4
Thornlie	Chris Tallentire	ALP v LIB	30.9
Bassendean	Dave Kelly	ALP v LIB	31.6
Butler	John Quigley	ALP v LIB	32.2
Southern River	Terry Healy	ALP v LIB	33.1
Warnbro	Paul Papalia	ALP v LIB	33.4
Mirrabooka	Meredith Hammat	ALP v LIB	33.7
West Swan	Rita Saffioti	ALP v LIB	34.2
Kwinana	Roger Cook	ALP v LIB	34.8
Armadale	Tony Buti	ALP v LIB	35.5
Baldivis	Reece Whitby	ALP v LIB	36.9
Rockingham	Mark McGowan	ALP v LIB	37.7

Non-government seats
Marginal
North West Central	Vince Catania	NAT	1.7
Fairly safe
Moore	Shane Love	NAT	8.5
Safe
Central Wheatbelt	Mia Davies	NAT	10.7
Roe	Peter Rundle	NAT	11.1
Crossbench seats
Vasse	Libby Mettam	LIB	4.3
Cottesloe	David Honey	LIB	7.4

== Registered parties ==
The following parties contested the election:

- Animal Justice Party
- Australian Christians
- Daylight Saving Party
- Great Australian Party
- Greens Western Australia
- Health Australia Party
- Labor Party
- Legalise Cannabis Western Australia Party
- Liberal Party
- Liberal Democratic Party
- Liberals for Climate
- National Party of Australia
- No Mandatory Vaccination Party
- Pauline Hanson's One Nation
- Shooters, Fishers and Farmers Party
- Socialist Alliance
- Sustainable Australia
- WAxit Party
- Western Australia Party

== Key dates ==
Election dates are set in statute with four-year fixed terms, to be held on the second Saturday of March every four years.

Key dates for the election are:

Date	Event
29 January 2021	Dissolution of the Legislative Assembly
3 February 2021	Writs issued
11 February 2021	Close of party nominations (12 pm) and close of electoral rolls (6 pm)
12 February 2021	Close of nominations (12 pm) and draw of ballot paper positions
15 February 2021	Deadline for group voting ticket lodgement
22 February 2021	Early voting begins
13 March 2021	Polling day, between the hours of 8 am and 6 pm
18 March 2021	Last day for receipt of postal votes by 9 am

== Retiring MPs ==
=== Labor ===
- Janine Freeman MLA (Mirrabooka) – announced 25 November 2020
- Josie Farrer MLA (Kimberley) – announced 18 August 2020
- Fran Logan MLA (Cockburn) – announced 31 August 2020
- Mick Murray MLA (Collie-Preston) – announced 9 February 2020
- Peter Watson MLA (Albany) – announced 10 February 2020
- Ben Wyatt MLA (Victoria Park) – announced 16 November 2020
- Adele Farina MLC (South West) – lost preselection, announced retirement 26 June 2020
- Laurie Graham MLC (Agricultural) – announced 21 July 2020

=== Liberal ===
- John McGrath MLA (South Perth) – announced 30 October 2019
- Mike Nahan MLA (Riverton) – announced 2 December 2019
- Dean Nalder MLA (Bateman) – announced 1 December 2020
- Ken Baston MLC (Mining and Pastoral) – announced 2 December 2019
- Simon O'Brien MLC (South Metropolitan) – lost preselection 3 February 2020, did not renominate

=== Nationals ===
- Jacqui Boydell MLC (Mining and Pastoral) – announced 21 February 2020
- Colin Holt MLC (South West) – announced 19 August 2020

=== Greens ===
- Robin Chapple MLC (Mining and Pastoral) – announced 27 February 2020

== Campaign/candidate controversies ==
In January 2021, Liberal Party candidate for Victoria Park Amanda-Sue Markham defended her husband's controversial views on homosexuality and conversion therapy. Despite calls for her to do so, she did not withdraw from the election.

Additionally, the Liberal Party candidate for Baldivis, Andrea Tokaji, was forced to resign from the Liberal Party after making discredited claims about a link between 5G towers and COVID-19. She continued as an independent candidate for Baldivis, with the Liberal Party selecting Luke Derrick as her replacement.

On 25 February 2021, 16 days before Election Day, Leader of the Opposition Zak Kirkup conceded that the Liberals could not win the election, citing polling indicating immense popularity for McGowan and the Labor Government. Kirkup said that his main priority was ensuring the Liberals would be able to form a credible opposition, arguing that a Liberal party room reduced to the single digits would be in no position to stop Labor if it went "too far."

In March 2021, One Nation dumped Roger Barnett as its candidate for the seat of Forrestfield after offensive Muslim and Aboriginal comments emerged from his Facebook page that were posted between 2012 and 2018. It was also reported later that another One Nation candidate had comments that were offensive towards Muslim and African people.

== Opinion polling ==
=== Graphical summary ===
A graph showing the opinion polls leading up to the 2021 Western Australian election. Trend line is generated via a LOESS smoothener.

A graph showing the TPP Leading up to the 2021 Western Australian election, with a LOESS regression line.

=== Voting intention ===
Legislative Assembly (lower house) polling
Date	Firm	Primary vote						TPP vote
Date	Firm	ALP	LIB	NAT	GRN	ONP	OTH	ALP	LIB
13 March 2021 election		59.9%	21.3%	4.0%	6.9%	1.3%	6.6%	69.7%	30.3%
5–11 March 2021	Newspoll	57%	23%	3%	9%	2%	6%	66%	34%
18 February 2021	Newspoll	59%	23%	2%	8%	3%	5%	68%	32%
16 February 2021	uComms	46.8%	27.5%	5.1%	8.3%	6.9%	5.3%	61%	39%
16 February 2021	Online Research Unit	49%	24%	3%	9%	3%	12%	N/A
12 August 2018	YouGov-Galaxy	40%	32%	6%	11%	5%	6%	54%	46%
Oct–Dec 2017	Essential	41%	29%	4%	13%	7%	6%	57%	43%
Jul–Sep 2017	Essential	39%	32%	4%	12%	8%	6%	54%	46%
Apr–Jun 2017	Essential	44%	33%	4%	9%	5%	6%	55%	45%
11 March 2017 election		42.2%	31.2%	5.4%	8.9%	4.9%	7.4%	55.5%	44.5%

=== Better Premier and leadership approval ===
Better Premier and satisfaction polling*
Date	Firm	Preferred Premier			McGowan			Kirkup
Date	Firm	McGowan	Kirkup	Undecided	Satisfied	Dissatisfied	Undecided	Satisfied	Dissatisfied	Undecided
5–11 March 2021	Newspoll	79%	13%	8%	88%	10%	2%	32%	49%	19%
18 February 2021	Newspoll	83%	10%	7%	88%	10%	2%	29%	41%	30%

=== Electorate polling ===
Electorate	Date	Firm	Primary vote						TPP	
Electorate	Date	Firm	ALP	LIB	NAT	GRN	ONP	OTH	ALP	L/NP
Dawesville	11 March 2021	YouGov	55%	33%	—	3%	2%	7%	60%	40%

== Newspaper endorsements ==
Newspaper	Endorsement
The West Australian	Labor

== Results ==
=== Legislative Assembly ===
Government (53) Labor (53) Opposition (6) National (4) Liberal (2)

Winning party by electorate.

Legislative Assembly (IRV) – Turnout 85.46% (CV)
Party	Votes	%	Swing	Seats	+/–
Labor	846,116	59.92	▲17.72	53	▲13
Liberal	300,796	21.30	▼9.92	2	▼11
Greens	97,713	6.92	▼1.99	0	Steady
Nationals	56,448	4.00	▼1.40	4	▼2
No Mandatory Vaccination	23,178	1.64	New	0	Steady
Australian Christians	20,869	1.48	▼0.62	0	Steady
One Nation	17,824	1.26	▼3.67	0	Steady
Shooters, Fishers, Farmers	9,669	0.69	▼0.62	0	Steady
WAxit	7,984	0.57	▼0.43	0	Steady
Liberal Democrats	7,159	0.51	▲0.46	0	Steady
Western Australia	5,276	0.37	▼0.09	0	Steady
Legalise Cannabis	4,996	0.35	New	0	Steady
Sustainable Australia	1,356	0.10	New	0	Steady
Socialist Alliance	726	0.05	0	0	Steady
Liberals for Climate	552	0.04	▼0.13	0	Steady
Independents	11,328	0.80	▼1.04	0	Steady
Formal votes	1,411,990	96.24	▲0.78		
Informal votes	55,169	3.76	▼0.78		
Total	1,467,159			59	
Registered voters / turnout	1,716,732	85.46	▼2.06		
Two-party-preferred vote
Labor	983,299	69.68	▲14.14		
Liberal/Nationals	427,812	30.32	▼14.14		

Although the Liberals and Nationals did not contest the election as a coalition and are separate parties, the two-party-preferred calculation aggregates Labor/Liberal and Labor/Nationals contests.

==== Seats changing parties ====
Seat	Pre-2021			Swing	Post-2021		
Seat	Party	Member	Margin	Swing	Margin	Member	Party
Bateman	Liberal	Dean Nalder	7.8	14.5	6.7	Kim Giddens	Labor
Carine	Liberal	Tony Krsticevic	10.2	12.6	2.4	Paul Lilburne	Labor
Churchlands	Liberal	Sean L'Estrange	11.7	12.5	0.8	Christine Tonkin	Labor
Darling Range	Liberal	Alyssa Hayden	3.5*	16.5	12.9	Hugh Jones	Labor
Dawesville	Liberal	Zak Kirkup	0.8	14.7	13.9	Lisa Munday	Labor
Geraldton	National**	Ian Blayney	1.3	12.9	11.6	Lara Dalton	Labor
Hillarys	Liberal	Peter Katsambanis	0.4	19.3	19.0	Caitlin Collins	Labor
Kalgoorlie	Liberal	Kyran O'Donnell	6.2	18.2	12.0	Ali Kent	Labor
Nedlands	Liberal	Bill Marmion	8.0	10.8	2.8	Katrina Stratton	Labor
Riverton	Liberal	Mike Nahan	4.2	13.2	9.0	Jags Krishnan	Labor
Scarborough	Liberal	Liza Harvey	5.7	16.1	10.4	Stuart Aubrey	Labor
South Perth	Liberal	John McGrath	7.2	17.3	10.1	Geoff Baker	Labor
Warren-Blackwood	National	Terry Redman	12.8	14.1	1.3	Jane Kelsbie	Labor
Members listed in italics did not contest this election * Darling Range was won by Labor at the 2017 state election, but was regained by the Liberals at a 2018 by-election. The margin here is based on the by-election result. ** Ian Blayney defected from the Liberal Party to the Nationals in 2019. The margin shown here is the two-party margin Blayney achieved as a Liberal at the 2017 state election.

Labor's victory was built on a near-sweep of Perth. Labor had gone into the election holding 33 of Perth's 43 seats (having lost one at a by-election). It won an additional nine in 2021, some on swings of over 10 percent, leaving Cottesloe as the only non-Labor seat in the capital. Many of Labor's gains came in seats long considered Liberal heartland. For example, Nedlands, the seat of former Liberal premiers Charles and Richard Court, fell to Labor for the first time since its creation in 1930, while South Perth was taken by Labor for the first time since its creation in 1950.

Among the more prominent casualties was Opposition Leader Zak Kirkup, who was heavily defeated in his own seat of Dawesville on a swing of over 14 percent, and former opposition leader Liza Harvey, whose seat of Scarborough fell to a 16 percent swing.

On paper, Labor was left as the only party with official status in the legislature, as no other party won at least five seats. However, McGowan promised that the Nationals would be properly resourced as an opposition, envisaging that they would divide opposition funding with the Liberals.

=== Legislative Council ===
Government (22) Labor (22) Opposition (10) Liberal (7) National (3) Crossbench (4) Legalise Cannabis (2) Greens (1) Daylight Saving (1)

Map of seats won for each party per electoral division.

Legislative Council (STV/GVT) – Turnout 85.50% (CV)
Party	Primary votes	%	Swing	Seats	+/-
Labor	868,374	60.34	▲19.93	22	▲8
Liberal	254,380	17.68	▼9.03	7	▼2
Greens	91,849	6.38	▼2.22	1	▼3
National	40,285	2.80	▼1.63	3	▼1
Legalise Cannabis	28,473	1.98	New	2	▲2
Australian Christians	28,051	1.95	▲0.01	0	Steady
One Nation	21,259	1.48	▼6.71	0	▼3
Shooters, Fishers, Farmers	21,210	1.47	▼0.89	0	▼1
No Mandatory Vaccination	16,094	1.12	New	0	Steady
Western Australia Party	10,496	0.73	▲0.34	0	Steady
Animal Justice	9,732	0.64	▼0.42	0	Steady
Liberal Democrats	9,218	0.64	▼1.13	0	▼1
Liberals for Climate	7,515	0.52	▲0.08	0	Steady
WAxit	4,924	0.34	▼0.21	0	Steady
Sustainable Australia	4,405	0.31	New	0	Steady
Daylight Saving	3,485	0.24	▼0.44	1	▲1
Great Australian	3,397	0.24	New	0	Steady
Health Australia	3,105	0.22	New	0	Steady
Socialist Alliance	948	0.07	▼0.04	0	Steady
Independents	11,486	0.80	▼0.35	0	Steady
Other	482	0.03	New	0	Steady
Formal votes	1,439,168	98.05	▲0.76		
Informal votes	28,577	1.95	▼0.76		
Total	1,467,745			36	
Registered voters / turnout	1,716,732	85.50			

==== Distribution of seats ====
Electoral region	Seats held
Agricultural	
East Metropolitan	
Mining and Pastoral	
North Metropolitan	
South Metropolitan	
South West	

Daylight Saving
Greens
Labor
Legalise Cannabis
Liberal
National

== Demographic trends ==
While all electorates swung towards Labor, there was some correlation between certain characteristics (demographics as measured by the 2016 Australian Census) and the magnitude of the two-party-preferred swing to Labor in each electorate. This does not necessarily imply a causal relationship but rather some similarities between electoral districts which moved more or less towards the Labor party on the two-party-preferred.

=== Incumbent MP ===
Electoral districts which were flipped by a Labor candidate at the last election (e.g. the electoral district of Joondalup, which was a Liberal-held district prior to the 2017 Western Australian state election) saw a bigger swing to Labor than similar districts which were already Labor-held or which had not changed hands. Districts where a Labor incumbent retired (e.g. electoral district of Albany) saw a smaller swing to Labor than similar districts where there were no Labor retirements.

=== Age ===
Electoral districts with a high proportion of persons aged 60 years or older swung less to Labor than the rest of the state (R^{2} = 0.2, p < 0.001), even after adjusting for the incumbency effect mentioned above.

=== Occupation ===
Electoral districts with a high proportion of persons working in clerical or administrative jobs swung more to Labor than the rest of the state (R^{2} = 0.12, p < 0.01). This may be confounded by the fact that most such electorates are inner-city Perth electorates and therefore this may be more a factor of inner-city Perth swinging harder to Labor than the rest of the state, and not due to clerical/administrative-heavy electorates swinging to Labor per se.

=== Language ===
Electorates with a higher proportion of persons who spoke a language other than English at home also somewhat swung more to Labor than the rest of the state (R^{2} = 0.08, p < 0.05).

== See also ==
- Candidates of the 2021 Western Australian state election
- Members of the Western Australian Legislative Assembly, 2017–2021
- Members of the Western Australian Legislative Council, 2017–2021
