= Hugh Jones (politician) =

Australian politician (born 1966)

Hugh Jones MLA

Member of the Western Australian Legislative Assembly for Darling Range
- Incumbent
- Assumed office 13 March 2021
- Preceded by: Alyssa Hayden

Councillor of City of Armadale for River Ward
- In office 19 October 2019 – 13 March 2021

Personal details
- Born: 12 November 1966 (age 60) Bangor, Caernarvonshire, Wales
- Party: Labor
- Children: 2
- Website: www.hughjones.org.au

Military service
- Allegiance: Australia
- Branch/service: Royal Australian Navy
- Years of service: 1990–2021
- Rank: Lieutenant Commander

Hugh Trevor Jones (born 12 November 1966) is an Australian politician and former Lieutenant Commander at the Royal Australian Navy. He was elected as the Member of Parliament for the electorate of Darling Range in the Western Australian Legislative Assembly for the Australian Labor Party at the 2021 state election.

== Early life and naval career ==
Hugh Trevor Jones was born on 12 November 1966 in Bangor, Caernarvonshire, Wales in the United Kingdom. He was born in a family of healthcare workers where his father, Arthur Trevor Jones, was a dental surgeon, while his mother Margaret Vaughan Jones (née Owen) was a nurse. Jones spent his first eleven years of life in Wales, where he attended St Georges School in Llandudno from 1970 to 1974, and again briefly 1977. From 1975 to 1976, he attended Rydal Penrhos school in Colwyn Bay. His family then arrived in Australia on 26 January 1978. In Australia, his father worked as a dentist in Gosnells. In Western Australia, he attended Wesley College in South Perth.

In 1990, he joined the Royal Australian Navy where he met future premier Mark McGowan. During the 1990s and early 2000s, Jones lived in various states. From 1990 to 1991, he lived in both Queensland and Victoria; he then moved to the Australian Capital Territory where he lived for in 1992; then in the Northern Territory from 1992 to 1994; New South Wales in 1995; Victoria again in 1996; returning to WA in 1997, before then going to NSW in 1998; From 2000-2004, he lived in both NSW and the ACT.

== Political career ==
In 2019, Jones was elected to the City of Armadale as a councillor for River Ward. He would later become WA Labor's candidate for the electoral district of Darling Range in the 2021 Western Australian state election. Darling Range had been held by Alyssa Hayden from the Liberal party since 2018, who had won it in a by-election after the resignation of Barry Urban. The seat was declared a seat to watch at the election by the Australian Broadcasting Corporation and The West Australian.

On 13 March 2021, Jones won Darling Range with a swing of 15.4% from the results of the 2018 by-election. Notably, Jones won the marginal seat with 56 percent of the primary vote, enough to win without the need for preferences.

In 2025, Jones re-contested Darling Range at the state election on 8 March and was subsequently re-elected for a second term in office. Following the abnormally high watermark of the 2021 election, Jones only relinquished around 8.5% of the two candidate preferred vote which was a much smaller swing than what was experienced by comparable outer-metropolitan and peri-urban seats.

== Personal life ==
Jones returned to Perth in 2005 and has two adult children with his wife Cam who works as primary school teacher in Byford.

Western Australian Legislative Assembly
Preceded by Alyssa Hayden	Member for Darling Range; 2021–present	Incumbent
