= Tania Lawrence =

Australian politician

Tania Lawrence MP

Member of the Australian House of Representatives for Hasluck
- Incumbent
- Assumed office 21 May 2022
- Preceded by: Ken Wyatt

Personal details
- Born: 13 September 1973 (age 53) Perth, Western Australia
- Citizenship: Australian
- Party: Labor
- Education: Murdoch University; University of Western Australia
- Occupation: Public servant Corporate manager
- Website: www.tanialawrence.com.au

Tania Natalie Lawrence (born 13 September 1973) is an Australian politician. She is a member of the Australian Labor Party (ALP) and was elected to the House of Representatives at the 2022 federal election, representing the Western Australian seat of Hasluck. She was a ministerial adviser and corporate manager before her election to parliament.

== Early life ==
Lawrence was raised in York, Western Australia. She holds the degrees of Bachelor of Economics and Bachelor of Arts from Murdoch University and a Bachelor of Arts (Hons.) in Asian studies from the University of Western Australia.

== Career ==
Lawrence served as a policy advisor to WA state governments led by Richard Court, Geoff Gallop, Alan Carpenter and Colin Barnett. Between 2005 and 2010, she worked in the state government's Office of State Security and Emergency Coordination. She subsequently joined Woodside Petroleum as senior manager of global business integration.

Lawrence left a government position in 2021 to work full-time as managing director of the Beelu Forest Distilling Company, a boutique distillery which she established on her property in Mundaring. In 2021, her distillery received a $20,000 "innovation voucher" from the WA Department of Jobs, Tourism, Science and Innovation under a program for start-ups. Her distillery was the only business in the hospitality industry to receive innovation funding, with the other 20 recipients focusing on medical technology, biotechnology and robotics. The voucher was awarded to undertake laboratory research to develop a premium Australian organic spirits distilled with novel proprietary koji strain.

== Politics ==
In May 2018, Lawrence was selected as the ALP candidate for the 2018 Darling Range state by-election, which followed the resignation of former Labor MP Barry Urban over the falsification of his credentials. She was nominated at the last minute following the discovery that the new ALP candidate Colleen Yates had also provided false credentials. She lost the seat to the Liberal candidate Alyssa Hayden.

Lawrence was elected to the House of Representatives at the 2022 federal election. She defeated the incumbent Liberal MP Ken Wyatt, a federal government minister, in the seat of Hasluck. She is part of the Labor Right faction.

== Personal life ==
As of 2022, Lawrence lives with her husband on their rural property in Mundaring, Western Australia. She previously lost her house in the Toodyay bushfires in 2009.

In 2015, Lawrence was elected as the first female president of Motorcycling Australia. She held a motorcycle racing licence and had competed in road races at Barbagallo Raceway. Her collection included a BMW S1000RR, a Ducati SuperSport, and a Husqvarna dirtbike.

Parliament of Australia
Preceded by Ken Wyatt	Member for Hasluck; 2022–present	Incumbent
