= Russell Goodrick =

Australian politicical candidate and newsreader (1948–2021)

- Born: Michael Russell Goodrick; 1948; Manchester, England, United Kingdom
- Died: May 10, 2021 (aged 72–73); Perth, Western Australia, Australia
- Occupations: Newsreader; politician
- Years active: 1974–1997
- Political party: Western Australia

Michael Russell Goodrick (1948 – 10 May 2021) was an Australian politician and the former newsreader of Channel 9 in Western Australia from the 1974 to 1997. He served on the board of the Swan Chamber of Commerce and held numerous events in Perth since the 1990s, including Carols by Candlelight events in Perth. For his role as a presenter on Channel 9, he won a Logie award in 1983.

Goodrick helped create Crime Stoppers in Australia. In the 2017 Western Australian state election, he contested the East Metropolitan Region for the Julie Matheson for Western Australia party. He again contested in the 2018 Darling Range by-election for the Western Australia Party. In January 2021, he was diagnosed with necrotizing pancreatitis, which caused his death on 11 May 2021.

== Early life ==
Michael Russell Goodrick was born in 1948 in Manchester, United Kingdom. Goodrick was of Greek and Australian heritage, having Australian citizenship. He had eight siblings.

== Career ==
Goodrick began his media career by working in Sydney Radio 2GB in 1964. He then moved back to the United Kingdom, where he worked in London as a DJ at Harrods’ "Way In Boutique". His first role in television was with Harlech TV in Wales. Goodrick then returned to Australia, where he began working at MTN9, GMV6 and TCN9 as a newsreader and reporter in New South Wales and Victoria. During this time, Goodrick got involved with theatre for some time.

He then moved to Perth where he briefly worked for Channel 7 in 1974, before joining Channel 9 as a newsreader. Throughout his career from 1974 to 1997, he hosted over a thousand programs and documentaries, where he was quite popular among viewers, which led him to win a Logie award in 1983. In 1985, Goodrick launched the company MRG International. He was responsible for all the media around the 1993 Avon Descent. In 2004, Goodrick served as one of the eight members of the Football West board when it was formed. From 2005 to 2008, he was a member of the Football Hall of Fame Western Australian committee. Goodrick was also a non-executive director of Lumacom.

== Political career ==
As he was a member of the Western Australia party, he supported reforms to the family court of Western Australia, as well as promoting tourism in areas such as the East Metropolitan Region. Goodrick contested the 2018 Darling Range by-election as a candidate of the Western Australia party, with the party announcing his candidacy on 23 June 2018. On the ballot, he was listed at the top as number one. In the election he campaigned on expanding infrastructure in the electorate. The by-election saw Goodrick come in fifth out of eleven candidates, receiving 1,413 votes, 5.8% of all votes. During the 2021 Western Australia state election, he was the Western Australia candidate for the electoral district of Mount Lawley, where he came sixth out of the eight candidates, winning 321 votes and 1.3% of all votes.

== Personal life ==
Goodrick has two sons called Tom and Rodney Goodrick.

In January 2021, whilst driving to Esperance from Perth to work on the film Before Dawn as an associate producer, Goodrick fell ill with necrotizing pancreatitis, causing him to end his trip to Esperance early. Goodrick was then flown back to Perth by the Royal Flying Doctors Service, where he was then operated on. After a few weeks, he was discharged but had to be re-admitted to hospital. He then spent part of his time at the hospital in a coma. Goodrick's condition was kept private by his family. Russel Goodrick died on 10 May 2021 after his life support was switched when he was still in a coma. He died at age 72 years old and his funeral was held on 28 May 2021.
