= Ken Dunn =

Australian politician

Member of the Legislative Assembly of Western Australia
- In office 31 March 1962 – 20 February 1971
- Preceded by: Ray Owen
- Succeeded by: Ian Thompson
- Constituency: Darling Range

Personal details
- Born: 17 May 1912 Subiaco, Western Australia
- Died: 30 July 1976 (aged 64) Gooseberry Hill, Western Australia
- Party: Liberal

Kenneth Wathen Dunn (17 May 1912 – 30 July 1976) was an Australian politician who was a Liberal Party member of the Legislative Assembly of Western Australia from 1962 to 1971, representing the seat of Darling Range.

Dunn was born in Perth to Georgina Eustace (née Caporn) and Kenneth Wathen Dunn. He attended Guildford Grammar School, and then found work as a clerk. In 1940, Dunn enlisted in the Australian Imperial Force, and was posted to the 2/7th Field Regiment. He saw active duty in the Middle East and Borneo, and was involved in the Landing at Tarakan. After the war, Dunn worked for periods as a Vacuum Oil salesman, as a tearoom-operator in Kalamunda, and as a real estate agent. He was president of the Kalamunda Shire Council from 1960 to 1963, and also headed the local branch of the Returned Services League (RSL).

Dunn entered parliament at the 1962 state election, passing Ray Owen (the sitting Country Party member) by just a single vote on first preferences. This result was subsequently overturned by the Court of Disputed Returns, and a by-election for the seat was held in July 1962, at which Dunn confirmed his victory and extended the margin between him and Owen to 15 votes. Dunn increased his majority at the 1965 state election, and remained in parliament for another six years before retiring at the 1971 election. He died in Gooseberry Hill in July 1976, aged 64.

Parliament of Western Australia
Preceded by Ray Owen	Member for Darling Range; 1962–1971	Succeeded by Ian Thompson
