= Rod Caddies =

Australian politician

The Honourable Rod Caddies MLC
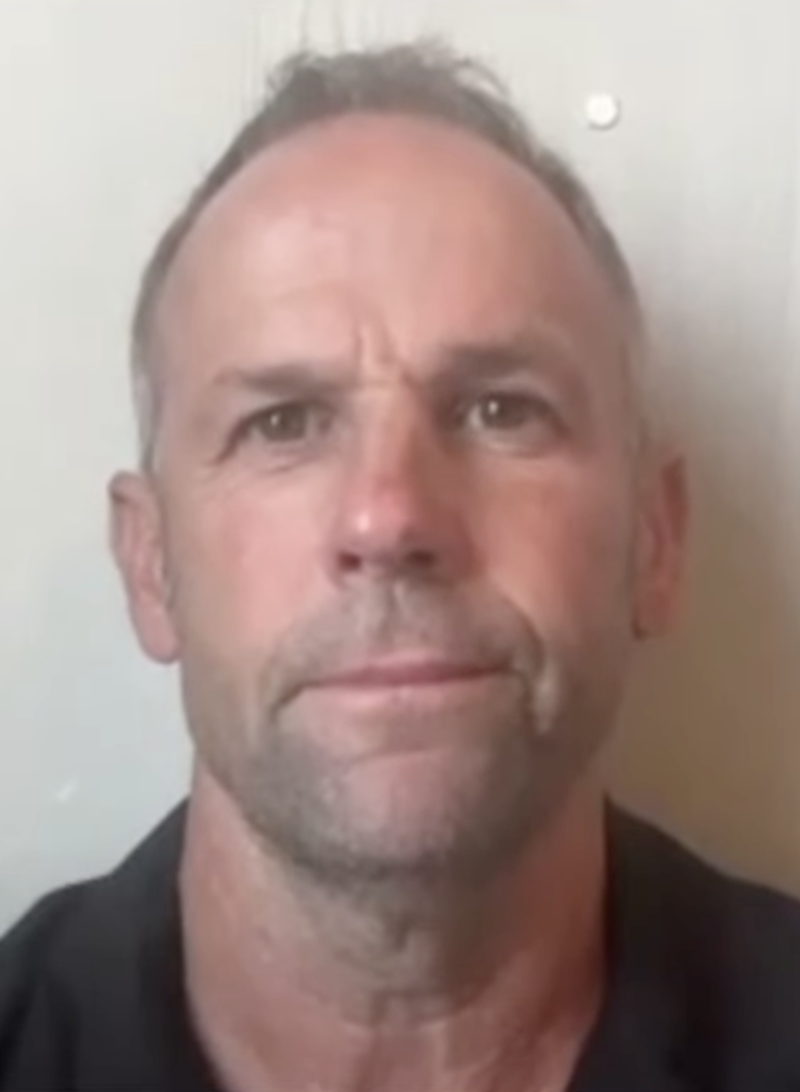
- Caddies in 2025

Leader of One Nation Western Australia
- Incumbent
- Assumed office 2023
- Preceded by: Colin Tincknell

Member of the Western Australian Legislative Council
- Incumbent
- Assumed office 22 May 2025
- Constituency: Whole of Western Australia

Personal details
- Party: One Nation
- Spouse: Monique Caddies
- Children: 3
- Occupation: Child protection worker, small business owner, politician

Military service
- Allegiance: Australia
- Branch/service: Australian Army Reserve
- Unit: 10th Light Horse Regiment

Rod Caddies is an Australian politician. He is a member of the Western Australian Legislative Council and the leader of One Nation Western Australia. He was elected to the council at the 2025 Western Australian state election, the first under the state's new single statewide electoral system for the upper house.

== Early life and career ==
Caddies grew up partly on a farm in the Manjimup area of the South West of Western Australia. In his inaugural speech to the Legislative Council, he said he had been raised for much of his childhood by a single mother with seven children and had spent periods in government care, foster homes and group homes.

Caddies has worked in child protection, construction and mining, and has been an army reservist. He served in the Australian Army Reserve with the 10th Light Horse Regiment, and spent 15 years working in the Western Australian Department for Child Protection, at times in the same group homes in which he had lived as a child. A former bull rider, he competed in rodeo until a serious injury ended his riding, after which he established a business organising and promoting rodeo events across Western Australia. He lives in Perth, where he and his wife run a horse-riding school.

== Political career ==
=== One Nation candidacies and party roles ===
Caddies first stood for Pauline Hanson's One Nation as an upper house candidate at the 2017 Western Australian state election, without being elected. He was the party's endorsed candidate at the 2018 Darling Range state by-election, and again contested a Legislative Council seat at the 2021 Western Australian state election. Between 2017 and 2021 he worked as chief of staff to One Nation's members of the Western Australian Parliament.

Caddies became president of One Nation in Western Australia in 2020, he stated he wanted to broaden the party's appeal and expand its base among younger voters. He was appointed state leader of the party by Pauline Hanson, succeeding Colin Tincknell, and led One Nation's Western Australian campaign for the 2025 state and federal elections.

=== Election to Parliament ===
Caddies was elected to the Western Australian Legislative Council at the 2025 Western Australian state election, held on 8 March 2025. The election was the first conducted under reforms that abolished the council's separate electoral regions and replaced them with a single statewide electorate. One Nation won enough of the statewide vote for a quota and returned two members, Caddies and Phil Scott. Caddies delivered his inaugural speech on 27 May 2025, in which he set out his personal background and policy priorities.

In the council, Caddies leads the One Nation party room and sits on the crossbench. He has used parliamentary questions and motions to pursue issues including regional police station staffing, the cost of state election campaigning, housing supply and population growth.

== Political positions ==
Caddies leads One Nation in Western Australia and broadly advocates the party's policy platform. Ahead of the 2025 election he campaigned on cost-of-living and housing pressures, criticising the major parties over education, child health and child protection, and called for an energy policy prioritising affordability and reliability over emissions-reduction targets. He has argued for reducing immigration and population growth in order to ease pressure on housing and infrastructure, while stating that he does not oppose immigration as such. He has proposed scrapping stamp duty for Western Australian first-home buyers while targeting foreign property investors.

Caddies has described himself as socially conservative and a Christian, and in his inaugural speech said he opposed government COVID-19 vaccination mandates introduced during the COVID-19 pandemic on the grounds of bodily autonomy. He supports retaining coal in the state's energy mix and is critical of net-zero emissions policies.

== Personal life ==
Caddies lives in Perth. He is married to Monique, with whom he runs a family horse-riding school, and the couple have three children. He is a Christian.

Western Australian Legislative Council
New title	Member of the Western Australian Legislative Council; 2025–present	Incumbent
Party political offices
Preceded by Colin Tincknell	Leader of One Nation Western Australia; 2023–present	Incumbent
