= Ian Thompson (politician) =

Australian politician

The Honourable Ian Thompson AM

22nd Speaker of the Legislative Assembly of Western Australia
- In office 24 May 1977 – 21 March 1983
- Preceded by: Ross Hutchinson
- Succeeded by: John Harman

Member of the Western Australian Legislative Assembly for Darling Range
- In office 20 February 1971 – 30 March 1974
- Preceded by: Ken Dunn
- Succeeded by: Constituency abolished

Member of the Western Australian Legislative Assembly for Kalamunda
- In office 30 March 1974 – 4 February 1989
- Preceded by: Constituency created
- Succeeded by: Constituency abolished

Member of the Western Australian Legislative Assembly for Darling Range
- In office 4 February 1989 – 6 February 1993
- Preceded by: Bob Greig
- Succeeded by: John Day

Personal details
- Born: 1 September 1935 Morawa, Western Australia
- Died: 2 December 2009 (aged 74) Perth, Western Australia
- Resting place: Karrakatta Cemetery
- Party: Liberal (from 1963); Independent (after 1989)
- Spouse: Margaret Lynette Eddy (m. 1958)
- Children: 4
- Education: Midland Junction High School
- Profession: Electrician, politician

Ian David Thompson AM (1 September 1935 – 2 December 2009) was an Australian politician who served as Speaker of the Western Australian Legislative Assembly.

Thompson was born in Morawa and left school in year 8, working as a carpenter, fitter and mechanic. In 1971 he was elected as the Liberal member for Darling Range. He transferred to Kalamunda in 1974 and back to Darling Range in 1989. He held various shadow ministries during the 1980s. In the 1970s he was one of a group of Liberal MPs to oppose the closure of the Tresillian disabled children's home; Thompson claimed Premier Sir Charles Court blamed him for the party disunity. In 1977 Thompson was elected Speaker of the Western Australian Legislative Assembly, and was required to use his casting vote after the National Country Party withdrew its support for a government bill to limit the ability of illiterate people to vote. Thompson voted against the measure, leading Court to demand his resignation; Thompson refused and faced a censure motion in the Liberal Party room, which was defeated after Margaret McAleer called for unity. Thompson would eventually resign from the Liberal Party anyway, and he retired from politics in 1993 as an independent.

Western Australian Legislative Assembly
Preceded by Ken Dunn	Member for Darling Range; 1971–1974	Electorate abolished
New seat	Member for Kalamunda; 1974–1989	Electorate abolished
Preceded by Bob Greig	Member for Darling Range; 1989–1993	Succeeded by John Day
Preceded by Ross Hutchinson	Speaker of the Western Australian Legislative Assembly; 1977–1983	Succeeded by John Harman
