= Electoral district of Serpentine-Jarrahdale =

Former electoral district in Western Australia

Serpentine-Jarrahdale Western Australia—Legislative Assembly
- State: Western Australia
- Dates current: 2005–2008
- Namesake: Shire of Serpentine-Jarrahdale
- Area: 1,359 km^{2} (524.7 sq mi)

Serpentine-Jarrahdale was an electoral district of the Legislative Assembly in the Australian state of Western Australia from 2005 to 2008.

The district was named for the Shire of Serpentine-Jarrahdale, which in turn is named for the communities of Serpentine and Jarrahdale in Perth's south-eastern hinterland.

== Geography ==
Serpentine-Jarrahdale was based in the south-eastern corner of the Metropolitan Region Scheme and was a mix of outer suburban communities and rural hinterland. It took in almost all of the Shire of Serpentine-Jarrahdale, as well as the less urban parts of the City of Armadale. In addition, the district also contained some of Perth's southern suburbs, stretching as far north as Atwell, Jandakot and Canning Vale.

== History ==
Serpentine-Jarrahdale was created for the 2005 state election. In territory, the district replaced much of the abolished Roleystone. However, only 41% of its voters came from Roleystone. The other 59% were previously part of the district of Southern River, which was radically redrawn.

Serpentine-Jarrahdale was abolished ahead of the 2008 state election. Much of the district's territory went to the radically redrawn Darling Range, whilst its eastern sections were added to Southern River and formed part of new seats of Jandakot and Kwinana.

The district's representative for its sole term was Liberal MP Tony Simpson. Simpson contested and won Darling Range at the 2008 election.

== Members for Serpentine-Jarrahdale ==
Member	Party	Term
Tony Simpson	Liberal	2005–2008
