= Colin Tincknell =

Australian politician (born 1953)

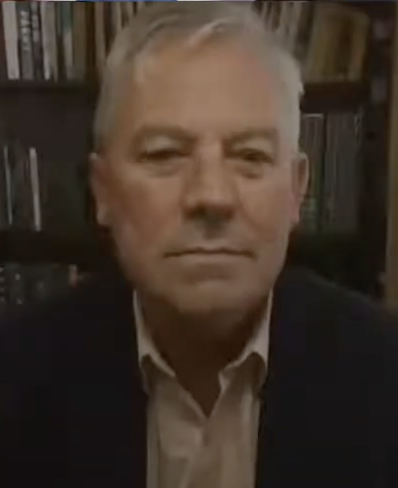

Leader of One Nation Western Australia
- In office 9 January 2017 – 2023
- Preceded by: John Fischer
- Succeeded by: Rod Caddies

Member of the Western Australian Legislative Council for South West Region
- In office 22 May 2017 – 21 May 2021

CEO of AFL New Zealand
- In office February 2002 – March 2004 Serving with Wayne Jackson, Andrew Demetriou

Personal details
- Born: Colin Richard Tincknell; 8 August 1953 (age 73) Wells, England, UK
- Spouse: Sandra Tincknell
- Children: Colin has 4
- Education: Swanbourne High School; Perth Technical College
- Occupation: Member of parliament; Company CEO; (Cameco; Tincknell Consultancy)
- Profession: Businessman; Politician
Australian rules football career
Personal information
- Original team: Claremont Football Club (WAFL)
Playing career
Years	Club	Games (Goals)
1968–1981	Claremont Football Club	
Coaching career
Years	Club	Games (W–L–D)
1979–2011	Perth Football League	
Career highlights
- Member of WA Parliament; CEO (Nyamal Aboriginal Corporation); CEO, AFL New Zealand (Auckland) signing Landmark agreement with Martu, Western Desert (Cameco Corporation); Coach, Vice Captain WA Amateur Football League 1979/80 (Perth)

Colin Richard Tincknell (born 8 August 1953) is a former Australian politician in Western Australian. He was elected to the Western Australian Legislative Council at the 2017 state election, as a member in South West Region. His term ran from 2017 to 2021.

Tincknell is a former CEO of an Aboriginal Corporation, before this he was a corporate social responsibility manager for a number of mining companies before his time in the Western Australian Parliament. He was the first CEO of AFL New Zealand, from 2002 to 2004. He played for the Claremont Football Club in the 1970s and 1980s.
