= George Spriggs (politician) =

Australian politician

Member of the Legislative Assembly of Western Australia
- In office 19 February 1977 – 3 September 1987
- Preceded by: None (new seat)
- Succeeded by: Bob Greig
- Constituency: Darling Range

Personal details
- Born: 28 January 1926 Kalamunda, Western Australia, Australia
- Died: 18 July 2015 (aged 89) Carmel, Western Australia, Australia
- Party: Country (to 1972); Liberal (from 1972)

George Clarence Charles Spriggs (28 January 1926 – 18 July 2015) was an Australian politician who was a Liberal Party member of the Legislative Assembly of Western Australia from 1977 to 1987, representing the seat of Darling Range.

Spriggs was born in Perth to Lyle Elizabeth (née Bunstan) and Charles William Spriggs. He attended Kalamunda High School, and subsequently worked as an orchardist. He later worked as an agent for a fruit export firm, and eventually settled in Pickering Brook, where he owned a general store and service station. Spriggs first stood for parliament at the 1968 state election, contesting Darling Range for the Country Party but placing third behind Liberal and Labor candidates. He also ran for the Country Party at the 1971 election, contesting the Legislative Council's West Province but again failing to make the two-party-preferred count.

In May 1971, Spriggs was elected to the Kalamunda Shire Council, where he served until 1977. He left the Country Party in 1972 and joined the Liberal Party, and at the 1977 state election won the seat of Darling Range (re-created after being abolished in 1974) with a large majority. Spriggs was re-elected at the 1980, 1983, and 1986 elections, but resigned from parliament in September 1987 and subsequently returned to his old profession, fruit-growing. He died in Perth in July 2015, aged 89. He had married Daphne Collings in 1947, with whom he had four children.

Parliament of Western Australia
New seat	Member for Darling Range; 1977–1987	Succeeded by Bob Greig
