= 1994 Helena state by-election =

The 1994 Helena state by-election was a by-election for the seat of Helena in the Legislative Assembly of Western Australia held on 10 September 1994. It was triggered by the resignation of Gordon Hill (the sitting Labor member) on 4 August 1994. The election was won by the Liberal Party, with their candidate, Rhonda Parker, recording 52.1 percent of the two-party-preferred vote. Parker became the first woman from the Liberal Party to win a by-election in Western Australia, and the fifth overall. Richard Court's government became the first sitting government to increase its majority at a by-election since 1943, when John Willcock's Labor government won East Perth from an independent.

== Background ==
Gordon Hill had held Helena for the Labor Party since its creation at the 1983 state election, having entered parliament the previous year at the 1982 Swan by-election. He had been appointed to the ministry after the 1986 election, and served under three premiers (Brian Burke, Peter Dowding and Carmen Lawrence). At the 1993 election, Hill had retained his seat with a margin of just 78 votes on the two-party-preferred count. He resigned from parliament on 4 August 1994, with the writ for the by-election issued on 11 August and the close of nominations on 18 August. Polling day was on 10 September, with the writ returned on 15 September.

== Results ==
Helena state by-election, 1994
Party	Candidate	Votes	%	±%
Liberal	Rhonda Parker	8,185	46.2	+1.6
Labor	Joe Bullock	6,823	38.5	–4.9
Greens	Lorraine Johnston	1,256	7.1	+0.7
Independent	Mark Schneider	578	3.3	+3.3
Confederate Action	Alan Rossiter	366	2.1	+2.1
Independent	Ivan Talbot	292	1.7	+1.7
Democratic Republican	James Connolly	137	0.8	0.8
	Alfred Bussell	78	0.4	+0.4
Total formal votes		17,733	96.1	+0.3
Informal votes		718	3.9	–0.3
Turnout		18,451	79.9	–14.6
Two-party-preferred result
Liberal	Rhonda Parker	9,237	52.1	+2.3
Labor	Joe Bullock	8,496	47.9	–2.3
Liberal gain from Labor		Swing	+2.3	

== Aftermath ==
Parker held Helena until it was abolished at the 1996 state election. She successfully transferred to the new seat of Ballajura, which she held until being defeated at the 2001 election. She served as a minister in the government of Richard Court from 1997. Parker's chief opponent at the by-election, Joe Bullock, was eventually elected to the Senate, where he served from 2014 to 2016.

== See also ==
- List of Western Australian state by-elections
- Women in the Western Australian Legislative Assembly
