= John Day (Australian politician) =

Australian politician

The Honourable John Day AM
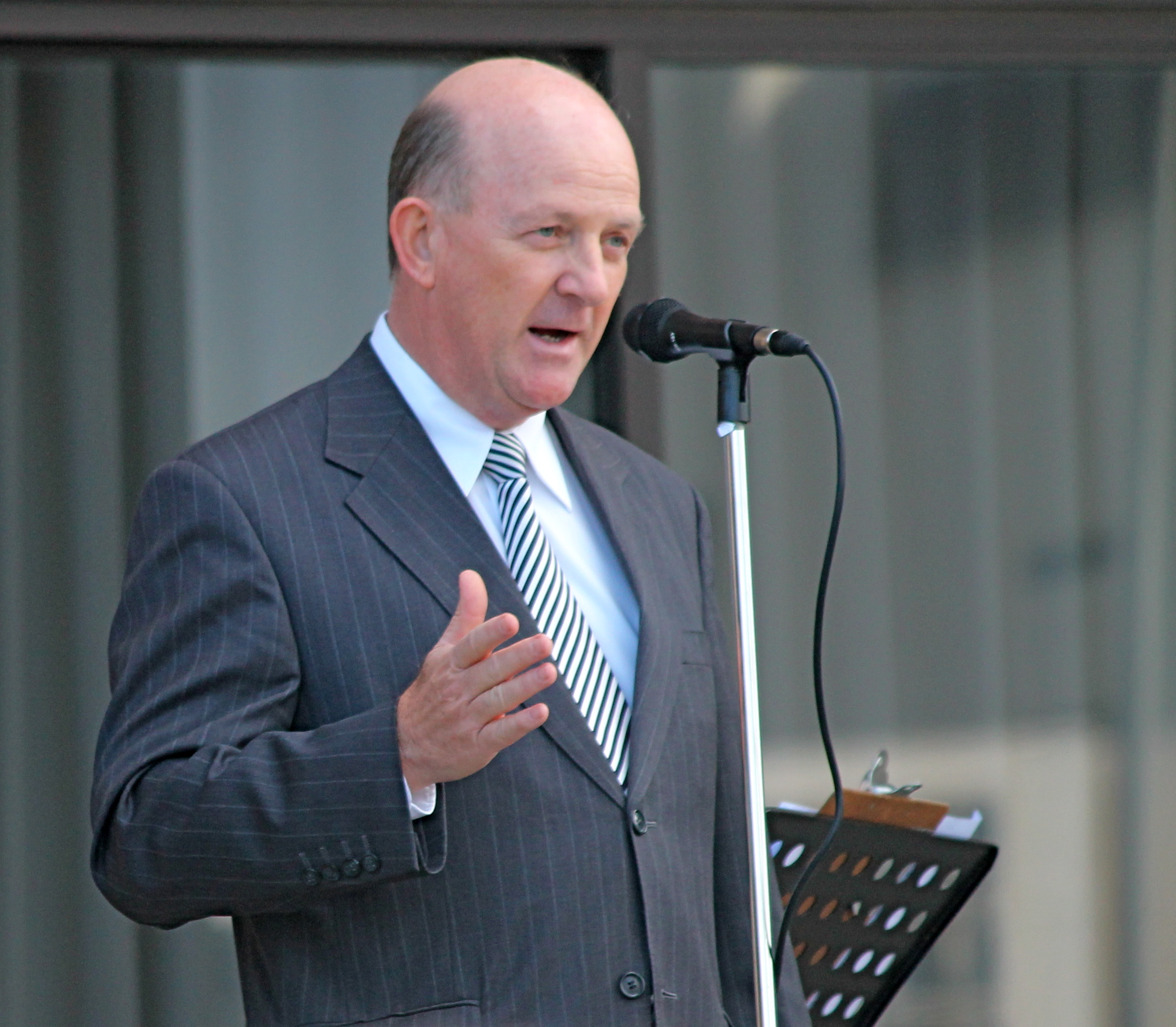

Member of the Western Australian Legislative Assembly for Kalamunda
- In office 6 September 2008 – 11 March 2017
- Preceded by: new seat
- Succeeded by: Matthew Hughes
- Constituency: Kalamunda

Member of the Western Australian Legislative Assembly for Darling Range
- In office 6 February 1993 – 6 September 2008
- Preceded by: Ian Thompson
- Succeeded by: Tony Simpson

Personal details
- Born: 24 December 1955 (age 70) Middle Swan, Western Australia
- Party: Liberal Party
- Children: Christopher (1986), James (1987), Olivia (1990)
- Education: BSc, BDSc
- Profession: Dentist

John Howard Dadley Day (born 24 December 1955) is a West Australian state politician. He was a Liberal member of the Western Australian Legislative Assembly from 1993 to 2017.

== Personal life ==
Day was born on 24 December 1955 in Middle Swan, Western Australia to John and Myfanwy Day. His father, who survived the Second Battle of El Alamein, died when Day was 17 years old.

Attending Guildford Grammar School, Day later completed a Bachelor of Science, and a Bachelor of Dental Science at the University of Western Australia going on to work at the Perth Dental Hospital as well as other clinical situations including Canning Vale Prison. He later set up a private practice with his sister Elizabeth working in such places as Wundowie, Glen Forrest and Beverley.

== Parliament ==
Winning pre-selection for the seat of Darling Range to the east of Perth following the retirement of sitting member Ian Thompson, Day won the seat in the 1993 state election. He successfully held the seat in the 1996, 2001 and 2005 state elections. In 2007 as a result of an electoral distribution under the Electoral Act 1907 (WA) all electoral boundaries in Western Australia were redrawn. The electoral district of Darling Range was redrawn and a new electoral district of Kalamunda was created containing a large portion of the previous electoral district of Darling Range. Day held this newly formed seat in the 2008 and 2013.

=== Court Government ===
In February 1993, a state election brought the Liberal Party and their coalition partner, the Nationals, to power with a stable majority to form the 34th parliament of W.A. under Premier Richard Court. Day held the following ministerial positions in the Court Government;

Date	Appointment
9 January 1997 to 28 July 1998	Minister for Police; Emergency Services
28 July 1998 to 15 February 2001	Minister for Health

=== Time in Opposition ===
In the 2001 state election, Day came very close to losing his seat after an 18.8% swing against him; but he won by 137 votes. However the Liberal Party was forced into opposition when the Labor Party took the majority. During the Liberal Party's time in opposition Day held the following positions;

Date	Appointment
9 March 2001 to 31 December 2001	Shadow Minister for Resources, Development and Energy; Pilbara & Opposition Business Manager
1 January 2002 to 27 May 2004	Shadow Minister for Education; Energy
27 May 2004 to 26 February 2005	Coalition Shadow Minister for Education and Training; Indigenous Affairs
9 March 2005 to 23 January 2008	Shadow Minister for Transport
24 January 2008 to 6 September 2008	Shadow Minister for Water Resources; Energy

=== Barnett Government ===
The 2008 state general election on 6 September resulted in a hung parliament with no party gaining a majority, but saw Day elected to the newly formed seat of Kalamunda. Ultimately, the Liberals were able to form government in the 38th parliament of W.A. in alliance with the WA Nationals, supported by three independents. Led by Premier Colin Barnett, Day held the following ministerial portfolios;

Date	Appointment
23 September 2008 to 31 March 2016	Minister for Planning
23 September 2008 to 17 March 2017	Minister for Culture and the Arts
14 December 2010 to 21 March 2013	Minister for Science and Innovation.
31 March 2016 to 17 March 2017	Minister for Health

He was also the Minister for Environment and Minister for Youth from 22 November to 14 December 2010, having temporarily taken over Donna Faragher's portfolios, and served as Leader of the House for 4 years from 21 March 2013 to 11 March 2017.

Day was defeated in his seat of Kalamunda at the 2017 Western Australian state election held on Saturday 11 March 2017 in which the Liberal Party was defeated by the Labor opposition, led by Opposition Leader Mark McGowan. In 2018 he was appointed to the Board of the Art Gallery of Western Australia, and in 2019 to the Board of the State Library of Western Australia, of which he is Chairman.

Western Australian Legislative Assembly
Preceded by Ian Thompson	Member for Darling Range; 1993–2008	Succeeded by Tony Simpson
New seat	Member for Kalamunda; 2008–2017	Succeeded by Matthew Hughes
