= Bob Greig =

Australian politician

Member of the Legislative Assembly of Western Australia
- In office 24 October 1987 – 4 February 1989
- Preceded by: George Spriggs
- Succeeded by: Ian Thompson
- Constituency: Darling Range

Personal details
- Born: 17 May 1942 (age 83) Melbourne, Victoria, Australia
- Party: Liberal

Robert William Greig (born 17 May 1942) is a former Australian politician who was a Liberal Party member of the Legislative Assembly of Western Australia from 1987 to 1989, representing the seat of Darling Range.

Greig was born in Melbourne to Mary Elizabeth (née Plumridge) and Robert Sinclair Greig, and attended Box Hill High School. He first lived in Western Australia between 1967 and 1974, where he worked as a manager for the Pastoralists and Graziers Association (PGA). After a period working for a construction industry peak organisation in South Australia, he returned to Western Australia in 1978, working in industrial relations roles for the Confederation of Western Australian Industry. Greig entered parliament at the 1987 Darling Range by-election, caused by the resignation of George Spriggs. He attempted to transfer to the seat of Helena at the 1989 state election, but was defeated by the sitting Labor member, Gavan Troy. After leaving office, Greig worked as a management consultant to various mining companies, and also developed a lavender farm in Mumballup (south of Collie).

Parliament of Western Australia
Preceded by George Spriggs	Member for Darling Range; 1987–1989	Succeeded by Ian Thompson
