= Electoral district of Darling Range =

State electoral district in Perth, Western Australia

Darling Range Western Australia—Legislative Assembly
- Interactive map of electoral district boundaries from the 2025 state election
- State: Western Australia
- Dates current: 1950–1974; 1977–present
- MP: Hugh Jones
- Party: Labor
- Namesake: Darling Range
- Electors: 31,150 (2021)
- Area: 1,395 km^{2} (538.6 sq mi)
- Demographic: Metropolitan
- Coordinates: 32.22°S 116.03°E
Electorates around Darling Range:
Armadale; Oakford	Thornlie	Kalamunda
Kwinana; Baldivis	Darling Range	Central Wheatbelt
Secret Harbour	Murray-Wellington	Central Wheatbelt

Darling Range is an electoral district of the Legislative Assembly in the Australian state of Western Australia.

The district is based to the east and south-east of Perth.

== Geography ==
Darling Range is situated in the outer east and south-east of Perth. It is a mixture of suburbia and hinterland, falling inside the Metropolitan Region Scheme and running along most of its southern and eastern boundary. The district covers all of the Shire of Serpentine-Jarrahdale as well as the less urbanised parts of the city of Armadale.

== History ==
Darling Range was first created for the 1950 state election. The seat's first member was Country MP Ray Owen, who was previously the member for Swan. The district was abolished ahead of the 1974 state election. By this time its member was Liberal MP Ian Thompson, who went on to represent the new district of Kalamunda. Darling Range was recreated one term later for the 1977 state election.

The seat was radically redistributed ahead of the 2008 state election, with 15% of the voters in the redrawn district coming from its former configuration. Half of the district's voters—and indeed the vast majority of its territory—previously belonged to the abolished district of Serpentine-Jarrahdale, with the remainder coming from Armadale and Swan Hills. Thus, sitting Serpentine-Jarrahdale member, Liberal MP Tony Simpson became the new member for Darling Range at the 2008 election, whilst the former member for Darling Range, Liberal MP John Day, successfully contested the new seat of Kalamunda.

Simpson served as the MP for Darling Range until his defeat by Barry Urban at the 2017 state election. This result marked the first time that the Labor Party had ever won the seat. In May 2018, Urban resigned from parliament as the privileges committee recommended his expulsion over a series of false claims of his credentials. At the subsequent by-election former East Metropolitan MLC Alyssa Hayden recovered the seat for the Liberals. Hayden was defeated by Labor candidate Hugh Jones at the 2021 election, marking the second time Labor had won the seat.

== Members for Darling Range ==
Darling Range (1950–1974)
Member	Party	Term
Ray Owen	Country	1950–1962
Ken Dunn	Liberal Country League	1962–1968
Ken Dunn	Liberal	1968–1971
Ian Thompson	Liberal	1971–1974
Darling Range (1977–present)
Member	Party	Term
George Spriggs	Liberal	1977–1987
Bob Greig	Liberal	1987–1989
Ian Thompson	Liberal	1989–1990
Ian Thompson	Independent	1990–1993
John Day	Liberal	1993–2008
Tony Simpson	Liberal	2008–2017
Barry Urban	Labor	2017
Barry Urban	Independent	2017–2018
Alyssa Hayden	Liberal	2018–2021
Hugh Jones	Labor	2021–present

== Election results ==
2025 Western Australian state election: Darling Range
Party	Candidate	Votes	%	±%
Labor	Hugh Jones	10,983	40.9	−16.0
Liberal	Paul Mansfield	6,462	24.1	−3.5
One Nation	Liam John Heerema	2,174	8.1	+6.0
Greens	Dominic Firmager	2,151	8.0	+3.6
Christians	Quintin Kleyn	1,540	5.7	+1.1
National	Morgan Byas	1,522	5.7	+5.7
Legalise Cannabis	Robert Peters	1,331	5.0	+5.0
Shooters, Fishers, Farmers	Ian Blevin	665	2.5	+2.5
Total formal votes		26,828	95.3	−1.1
Informal votes		1,309	4.7	+1.1
Turnout		28,137	87.3	+5.8
Two-party-preferred result
Labor	Hugh Jones	14,765	55.1	−9.0
Liberal	Paul Mansfield	12,046	44.9	+9.0
Labor hold		Swing	−9.0	
