= Tony Simpson =

Australian politician

The Honourable Tony Simpson

Member of the Legislative Assembly of Western Australia
- In office 6 September 2008 – 11 March 2017
- Preceded by: John Day
- Succeeded by: Barry Urban
- Constituency: Darling Range
- In office 26 February 2005 – 6 September 2008
- Preceded by: None (new seat)
- Succeeded by: None (abolished)
- Constituency: Serpentine-Jarrahdale

Personal details
- Born: Anthony James Simpson; 15 July 1965 (age 61) Frankston, Victoria, Australia
- Party: Liberal

Anthony James Simpson (born 15 July 1965) is a former Australian politician who was a Liberal Party member of the Legislative Assembly of Western Australia from 2005 to 2017. He served as a minister in the government of Colin Barnett from March 2013 to September 2016. Simpson ran a bakery before entering politics.

== Early life ==
Simpson was born in Melbourne to Rita (née Bailey) and Charles Simpson. His family moved to Wyndham, Western Australia, in 1970, and later to Perth, where he attended CBC Leederville (now Aranmore Catholic College). After leaving school, Simpson worked in the family bakery, and later opened his own business in Byford. He served on the Serpentine-Jarrahdale Shire Council from 2001 to 2005.

== Politics ==
Simpson entered parliament at the 2005 state election, winning the newly created seat of Serpentine-Jarrahdale with 51.2 percent of the two-party-preferred vote. He was included in the shadow ministry of Matt Birney immediately after being elected, and subsequently served as a shadow minister under three more leaders of the opposition – Paul Omodei, Troy Buswell, and Colin Barnett. At the 2008 state election, Simpson transferred to the seat of Darling Range, where the sitting member, John Day, had himself transferred to the seat of Kalamunda.

After the 2008 election, Simpson was made a parliamentary secretary in the new ministry formed by Colin Barnett. He served in that position until July 2011, when he was instead made government whip. After the 2013 election, Simpson was made Minister for Local Government, Minister for Community Services, Minister for Seniors and Volunteering, and Minister for Youth. He resigned from the ministry in September 2016, citing a lack of support for the government and Colin Barnett's leadership of the Liberal Party.

== See also ==
- Barnett Ministry

Parliament of Western Australia
New seat	Member for Serpentine-Jarrahdale; 2005–2008	Abolished
Preceded by John Day	Member for Darling Range; 2008–2017	Succeeded by Barry Urban
Political offices
Preceded by John Castrilli	Minister for Local Government; 2013–2016	Succeeded by Paul Miles
Preceded by Robyn McSweeney	Minister for Community Services; 2013–2016	Succeeded by Paul Miles
Preceded by Robyn McSweeney	Minister for Seniors and Volunteering; 2013–2016	Succeeded by Paul Miles
Preceded by Robyn McSweeney	Minister for Youth; 2013–2016	Succeeded by Paul Miles
