= Electoral district of Burns Beach =

State electoral district of Western Australia

Burns Beach Western Australia—Legislative Assembly
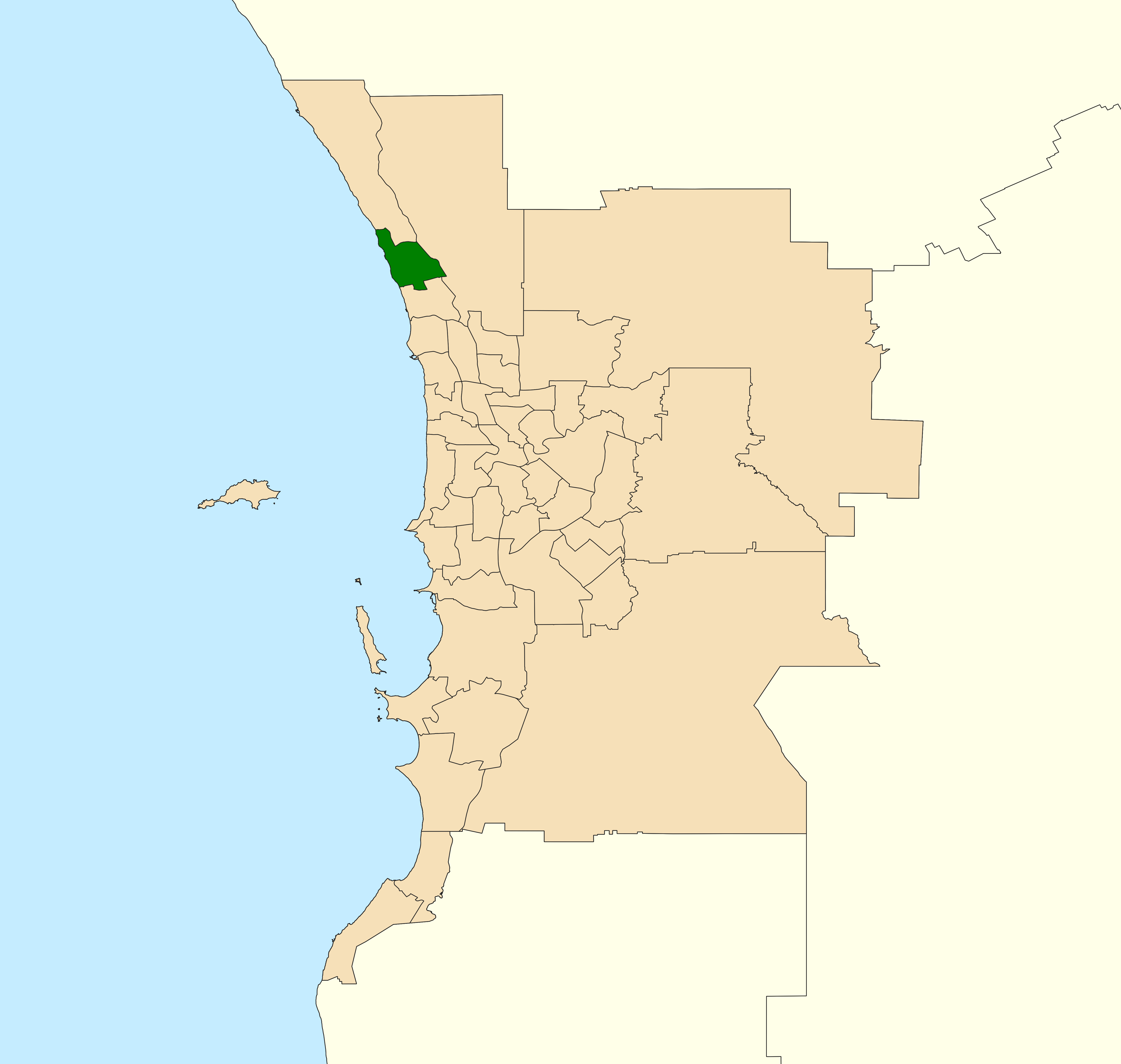
- Interactive map of district boundaries from the 2021 state election to 2025
- State: Western Australia
- Dates current: 2017–2025
- MP: Mark Folkard
- Party: Labor
- Namesake: Burns Beach
- Electors: 29,974 (2021)
- Area: 40 km^{2} (15.4 sq mi)
- Demographic: Metropolitan
- Coordinates: 33.33°S 115.66°E

Burns Beach was an electoral district of the Legislative Assembly of Western Australia. It was located in Perth's northern suburbs, and named after the suburb of Burns Beach.

== Geography ==
Burns Beach includes the suburbs of Burns Beach, Mindarie, Quinns Rocks, Clarkson, Tamala Park, Kinross, as well as portions of Currambine and Neerabup. It is bounded by Hampshire Drive, Marmion Avenue and Hester Avenue to the north; Wanneroo Road to the east; Joondalup Drive, Moore Drive and Burns Beach Road to the south; and the Indian Ocean to the west.

== History ==
Burns Beach was created by the Western Australian Electoral Commission in a 2015 redistribution, and gained its first member at the 2017 state election. It incorporates areas that previously fell into the seats of Butler, Joondalup and Ocean Reef.

The district boundaries were redistributed in 2019 and saw the suburbs of Iluka and part of Joondalup being removed while the suburb Quinns Rocks was added.

The district was abolished in a redistribution leading up to the 2025 Western Australian state election and was replaced with the new electoral division of Electoral district of Mindarie, which was won by the incumbent MLA for Burns Beach Mark Folkard.

== Members for Burns Beach ==
Member	Party	Term
Mark Folkard	Labor	2017–2025

== Election results ==
2021 Western Australian state election: Burns Beach
Party	Candidate	Votes	%	±%
Labor	Mark Folkard	17,193	70.1	+25.8
Liberal	Trish Botha	4,545	18.5	−19.0
Greens	Louis Marchant	1,355	5.5	−3.6
Christians	Graeme Offereins	625	2.5	+0.5
No Mandatory Vaccination	Meredith Campbell	585	2.4	+2.4
WAxit	Peter Rosengrave	223	0.9	−0.3
Total formal votes		24,526	96.4	+1.7
Informal votes		916	3.6	−1.7
Turnout		25,442	84.9	+1.3
Two-party-preferred result
Labor	Mark Folkard	18,849	76.9	+21.5
Liberal	Trish Botha	5,669	23.1	−21.5
Labor hold		Swing	+21.5	
