= Alyssa Hayden =

Australian politician (born 1970)

Member of the Western Australian Legislative Assembly for Darling Range
- In office 23 June 2018 – 13 March 2021
- Preceded by: Barry Urban
- Succeeded by: Hugh Jones

Member of the Western Australian Legislative Council for East Metropolitan Region
- In office 22 May 2009 – 21 May 2017

Personal details
- Born: Alyssa Kathleen Wallis; 7 June 1970 (age 56) Perth, Western Australia
- Party: Liberal
- Spouse: Terry Hayden (m. 1994)

Alyssa Kathleen Hayden (née Wallis; born 7 June 1970) is an Australian politician.

Born in Perth, Hayden was a proprietor of a small business and a Senate staff member before entering politics. In 2008, she was elected to the Western Australian Legislative Council as a Liberal Party member, representing East Metropolitan Region. Her term began on 22 May 2009. She was defeated at the 2017 state election.

In May 2018, Hayden was preselected as the Liberal candidate in the Darling Range by-election, held on 23 June, and regained the seat for the Liberals. She failed to retain the seat at the 2021 election.

After the 2021 election, Hayden started working in real estate sales.

Western Australian Legislative Assembly
Preceded by Barry Urban	Member for Darling Range; 2018–2021	Succeeded by Hugh Jones
