= 2018 Darling Range state by-election =

Western Australian state by-election

- 23 June 2018

The Darling Range seat in the Legislative Assembly

	First party	Second party
Candidate	Alyssa Hayden	Tania Lawrence
Party	Liberal	Labor
Popular vote	8,418	7,809
Percentage	34.5%	32.0%
Swing	▲4.1	▼9.5
TPP	53.5%	46.5%
TPP swing	▲9.3	▼9.3
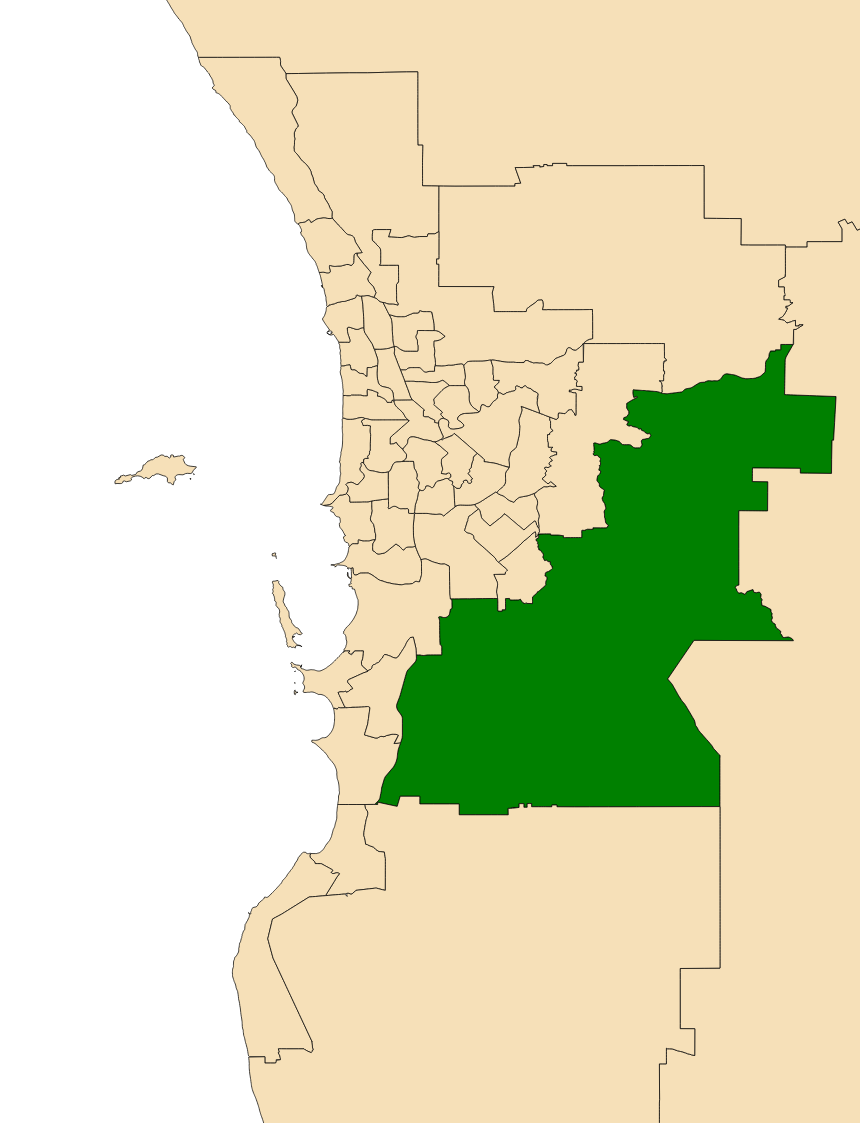
- The Darling Range seat in Western Australia
MP before election
Barry Urban
Labor
Elected MP
Alyssa Hayden
Liberal

A by-election for the Western Australian Legislative Assembly seat of Darling Range was held on 23 June 2018 following the resignation of Barry Urban on 8 May.

Won by Labor for the first time in the seat's history at the landslide 2017 state election, the Liberals regained the seat.

== Background ==
Following a large 19 percent two-party swing, Barry Urban was the first ever Labor candidate to be elected to the previously safe Liberal seat of Darling Range in the seat's 64-year history at the landslide state election in March 2017. In November 2017, Urban resigned from Labor and moved to the crossbench to sit as an independent, after questions were raised about his academic claims and his wearing an overseas police service medal he had not been awarded. Urban was referred to the procedures and privileges committee, which in May 2018 recommended his expulsion from the Legislative Assembly for contempt of parliament and misleading the House. Urban resigned immediately after the committee's report was released.

Labor originally selected Colleen Yates as its candidate for the by-election. However, on 24 May 2018, Yates announced that she would withdraw from the race, after reporters discovered that she had incorrectly claimed multiple university degrees which she had never obtained on her LinkedIn profile.

== Candidates ==
Candidates (11) in ballot paper order
Party	Candidate	Background
Western Australia	Russell Goodrick	TV producer and journalist. Candidate for East Metropolitan region at the 2017 election.
Greens	Anthony Pyle	Disability support worker. Candidate for Armadale at the 2017 election.
Animal Justice	Jehni Thomas-Wurth	City of Armadale Librarian.
Liberal	Alyssa Hayden	Former member of the Legislative Council for East Metropolitan region.
Fluoride Free	John Watt	Candidate for East Metropolitan region at the 2017 election.
One Nation	Rod Caddies	Candidate for Agricultural region at the 2017 election.
Labor	Tania Lawrence	Manager at Woodside Petroleum and former public servant.
Christians	Eric Eikelboom	
SFF	Stuart Ostle	Candidate for Darling Range at the 2017 election.
Independent	Doug Shaw	Realtor and property manager. Former state president of Pauline Hanson's One Nation.
Independent	George O'Byrne	

== Polling ==
Darling Range by-election polling
Date	Firm	Commissioned by	Sample	Primary vote						Two-party vote
				ALP	LIB	ONP	GRN	OTH	UND	ALP	LIB
c. 14 June 2018	ReachTEL	The Weekend West	>600	37.5%	31%	9.4%	3.5%	~8.5%	~10%	54%	46%
2017 election				41.5%	30.4%	8.7%	7.7%	11.8%		55.8%	44.2%

== Results ==
Darling Range state by-election, 2018
Party	Candidate	Votes	%	±%
Liberal	Alyssa Hayden	8,418	34.5	+4.1
Labor	Tania Lawrence	7,809	32.0	−9.5
One Nation	Rod Caddies	1,894	7.8	−1.0
Greens	Anthony Pyle	1,427	5.8	−1.8
Western Australia	Russell Goodrick	1,413	5.8	+5.8
Christians	Eric Eikelboom	1,145	4.7	+0.3
Shooters, Fishers, Farmers	Stuart Ostle	1,112	4.6	+0.3
Animal Justice	Jehni Thomas-Wurth	803	3.3	+3.3
Independent	Doug Shaw	146	0.6	+0.6
Independent	George O'Byrne	137	0.5	+0.5
Fluoride Free WA	John Watt	106	0.4	+0.4
Total formal votes		24,410	95.6	+0.5
Informal votes		1,126	4.4	−0.5
Turnout		25,536	78.4	−11.1
Two-party-preferred result
Liberal	Alyssa Hayden	13,039	53.5	+9.3
Labor	Tania Lawrence	11,331	46.5	−9.3
Liberal gain from Labor		Swing	+9.3	

Ninety-two minutes after polling booths closed, the Australian Broadcasting Corporation's Antony Green called the by-election for the Liberals.

== See also ==
- List of Western Australian state by-elections
- 2018 Cottesloe state by-election
