= Mark Folkard =

Australian politician

Mark Folkard MLA

Member of the Western Australian Legislative Assembly for Burns Beach
- In office 11 March 2017 – 8 March 2025
- Preceded by: District created
- Succeeded by: District abolished

Member of the Western Australian Legislative Assembly for Mindarie
- Incumbent
- Assumed office 8 March 2025
- Preceded by: District created

Personal details
- Born: 23 January 1965 (age 61) Perth, Western Australia
- Party: Labor
- Occupation: Police officer
- Website: www.markfolkard.com.au

Mark James Folkard (born 23 January 1965) is an Australian politician. He has been a Labor member of the Western Australian Legislative Assembly since the 2017 state election, representing Burns Beach which was renamed Mindarie from 2025.

Folkard was a Western Australia Police Sergeant before entering politics.

Folkard has been awarded the Police Overseas Service Medal with East Timor clasp, the National Police Service Medal, the National Medal, the Australian Defence Medal, the Commissioner's Medal for Excellence, the Western Australia Police Medal, and the United Nations Medal (UNMISET).

Western Australian Legislative Assembly
New seat	Member for Burns Beach; 2017–2025	Seat abolished
New seat	Member for Mindarie; 2025–present	Incumbent
