= Barry Urban =

Australian politician (1968–2025)

Member of the Western Australian Legislative Assembly for Darling Range
- In office 11 March 2017 – 8 May 2018
- Preceded by: Tony Simpson
- Succeeded by: Alyssa Hayden

Personal details
- Born: 10 December 1968 Ashington, Northumberland, England
- Died: 15 February 2025 (aged 56) Perth, Western Australia, Australia
- Party: Labor (2012–2017); Independent (2017–2018)

Barry Urban (10 December 1968 – 15 February 2025) was an Australian politician. He was a member of the Western Australian Legislative Assembly representing Darling Range from March 2017 until his resignation in May 2018. Urban was elected as a member of the Labor Party but resigned from the party and sat as an independent from November 2017, after a series of scandals involving false claims of his credentials, including his educational qualifications and his wearing of a police overseas service medal to which he had no entitlement.

In May 2018, the parliament's procedures and privileges committee recommended Urban be expelled from the assembly after it found he had misled the house on five occasions. Urban resigned immediately after the tabling of the committee's report, and his seat was lost to the Liberal Party in the subsequent by-election. Urban was charged by Western Australian police with twelve counts of forgery, attempted fraud and false evidence in September 2018, for which he was sentenced to three years in jail. He was released after serving 18 months. He died after allegedly being punched in the head following an argument.

== Early life ==
Urban was born in Ashington, Northumberland, England, and joined the British Army after leaving school. He claimed to have served in Northern Ireland, Cyprus and Namibia and, in 1989, joined the police. He claimed to have worked as a detective, and later as a war crimes investigator in Bosnia. None of this was able to be verified when requested, and was removed from his parliamentary biography following a scandal where he wore an Australian Police Overseas Service Medal without being entitled to it.

He relocated to Western Australia around 2000 and worked in the construction industry until joining Western Australian police in 2005. He also served on Serpentine-Jarrahdale Shire Council.

Urban was working for South West Metro Youth Justice services, as a Youth Justice Officer before he was elected to the Parliament of Western Australia.

== Political career ==
Urban first contested Darling Range for Labor at the 2013 state election, but was heavily defeated by incumbent Tony Simpson, winning only 34.7 percent of the two-party vote. Urban was again pre-selected to contest the electorate at the 2017 state election, this time defeating Simpson, achieving an 18.9% two-party preferred swing. He was the first Labor member ever to win Darling Range; for most of its existence it had been considered to be a safe Liberal seat.

In November 2017, Urban was asked to explain why he wore an Australian Police Overseas Service Medal to commemoration services, despite not having served overseas for an Australian police force. Urban claimed that he was awarded a medal by British police for his work as a war crimes investigator in Bosnia-Herzegovina in the late 1990s, but that he had somehow been sent the wrong medal by authorities in the UK. A day later, he issued a statement saying that he had ordered a commemorative International Police Service Medal from a military supply store because he felt he was entitled to one, but had received a POSM in error. In addition, the University of Leeds stated that it had no record of Urban attending the institution, or completing a Bachelor of Arts in health and physical education there, as he had claimed. His claims to have completed a certificate of higher education in policing at the University of Portsmouth, and a diploma of local government in Western Australia, were also questioned, and later found to be false.

In response to Urban's statement, the United Nations and Overseas Policing Association of Australia announced it would be lobbying Australian federal parliamentarians to make it a criminal offence "with considerable penalties" for people to wear medals to which they are not entitled.

On 29 November 2017, Urban announced his resignation from the Labor Party. The following day, after addressing parliament, Urban was referred to the procedures and privileges committee.

On 8 May 2018, the committee released its report. The committee found Urban had committed a "gross and aggravated contempt of parliament" and had misled the house on five occasions. It also found that Urban had breached the trust of his constituents and his colleagues by representing himself as someone he was not. The committee recommended that Urban be expelled from the Legislative Assembly, concluding that Urban's continued presence in the legislature was not "appropriate or tenable." On the day the report was due to be released, ABC News reported that Urban planned to resign from Parliament. Minutes after the report was tabled, Urban resigned rather than face all-but-certain expulsion. A by-election for Darling Range was held on 23 June, with the Liberal candidate Alyssa Hayden winning the seat.

== Post-resignation ==
On 21 September 2018, Urban was arrested by Western Australian police major fraud squad and charged with twelve offences, including forgery and attempted fraud over applications he made to Western Australian police, and five false evidence charges relating to information given to the parliamentary committee. He was subsequently found guilty and sentenced to three years in jail in November 2021. He was released from jail after serving 18 months. Following that, he worked at a tyre business in Kelmscott.

In January 2022, Urban was fined $20,000 and asked to pay $1,900 in costs for illegally dumping thousands of tyres at two properties in Armadale between January and July 2020.

Urban died at Royal Perth Hospital on 15 February 2025 due to a severe brain injury, three months after he was allegedly punched in the head outside his workplace in Kelmscott following an argument. He was 56. At the time of the incident, a 25-year-old man, was charged with grievous bodily harm, common assault, aggravated burglary, no authority to drive, and reckless driving.

Western Australian Legislative Assembly
Preceded by Tony Simpson	Member for Darling Range; 2017–2018	Succeeded by Alyssa Hayden
