= Members of the Western Australian Legislative Assembly, 2025–2029 =

This is a list of members of the Western Australian Legislative Assembly from 2025 to 2029.

== List ==
District	Party	Name	Term in office	Ref
Albany	National	Scott Leary	2025–present	
Armadale	Labor	Tony Buti	2010–present	
Balcatta	Labor	David Michael	2017–present	
Baldivis	Labor	Reece Whitby	2017–present	
Bassendean	Labor	Dave Kelly	2013–present	
Bateman	Labor	Kim Giddens	2021–present	
Belmont	Labor	Cassie Rowe	2017–present	
Bibra Lake	Labor	Sook Yee Lai	2025–present	
Bicton	Labor	Lisa O'Malley	2017–present	
Bunbury	Labor	Don Punch	2017–present	
Butler	Labor	Lorna Clarke	2025–present	
Cannington	Labor	Ron Sao	2025–present	
Carine	Liberal	Liam Staltari	2025–present	
Central Wheatbelt	National	Lachlan Hunter	2025–present	
Churchlands	Liberal	Basil Zempilas	2025–present	
Cockburn	Labor	David Scaife	2021–present	
Collie-Preston	Labor	Jodie Hanns	2021–present	
Cottesloe	Liberal	Sandra Brewer	2025–present	
Darling Range	Labor	Hugh Jones	2021–present	
Dawesville	Labor	Lisa Munday	2021–present	
Forrestfield	Labor	Stephen Price	2017–present	
Fremantle	Labor	Simone McGurk	2013–present	
Geraldton	National	Kirrilee Warr	2025–present	
Girrawheen	Labor	Meredith Hammat	2021–present	
Hillarys	Labor	Caitlin Collins	2021–present	
Jandakot	Labor	Stephen Pratt	2025–present	
Joondalup	Labor	Emily Hamilton	2017–present	
Kalamunda	Liberal	Adam Hort	2025–present	
Kalgoorlie	Labor	Ali Kent	2021–present	
Kimberley	Labor	Divina D'Anna	2021–present	
Kingsley	Labor	Jessica Stojkovski	2017–present	
Kwinana	Labor	Roger Cook	2008–present	
Landsdale	Labor	Daniel Pastorelli	2025–present	
Mandurah	Labor	Rhys Williams	2025–present	
Maylands	Labor	Dan Bull	2025–present	
Midland	Labor	Steve Catania	2025–present	
Mid-West	National	Shane Love	2013–present	
Mindarie	Labor	Mark Folkard	2017–present	
Morley	Labor	Amber-Jade Sanderson	2017–present	
Mount Lawley	Labor	Frank Paolino	2025–present	
Murray-Wellington	Liberal	David Bolt	2025–present	
Nedlands	Liberal	Jonathan Huston	2025–present	
Oakford	Labor	Yaz Mubarakai	2017–present	
Perth	Labor	John Carey	2017–present	
Pilbara	Labor	Kevin Michel	2017–present	
Riverton	Labor	Jags Krishnan	2021–present	
Rockingham	Labor	Magenta Marshall	2023–present	
Roe	National	Peter Rundle	2017–present	
Scarborough	Labor	Stuart Aubrey	2021–present	
Secret Harbour	Labor	Paul Papalia	2007–2026	
Secret Harbour	One Nation	Luke Herdegen	2026–present	
Southern River	Labor	Terry Healy	2017–present	
South Perth	Labor	Geoff Baker	2021–present	
Swan Hills	Labor	Michelle Maynard	2025–present	
Thornlie	Labor	Colleen Egan	2025–present	
Vasse	Liberal	Libby Mettam	2014–present	
Victoria Park	Labor	Hannah Beazley	2021–present	
Wanneroo	Labor	Sabine Winton	2017–present	
Warren-Blackwood	National	Bevan Eatts	2025–present	
West Swan	Labor	Rita Saffioti	2008–present	
