= Members of the Western Australian Legislative Assembly, 2021–2025 =

This is a list of members of the Western Australian Legislative Assembly from 2021 to 2025.

== List of members ==
Name	Party	District	Term in office
Stuart Aubrey	Labor	Scarborough	2021–present
Geoff Baker	Labor	South Perth	2021–present
Lisa Baker	Labor	Maylands	2008–2025
Merome Beard^{[1]}	National	North West Central	2022–2023
Merome Beard^{[1]}	Liberal	North West Central	2023–2025
Hannah Beazley	Labor	Victoria Park	2021–present
Tony Buti	Labor	Armadale	2010–present
John Carey	Labor	Perth	2017–present
Vince Catania^{[1]}	National	North West Central	2008–2022
Robyn Clarke	Labor	Murray-Wellington	2017–2025
Caitlin Collins	Labor	Hillarys	2021–present
Roger Cook	Labor	Kwinana	2008–present
Lara Dalton	Labor	Geraldton	2021–2025
Divina D'Anna	Labor	Kimberley	2021–present
Mia Davies	National	Central Wheatbelt	2013–2025
Mark Folkard	Labor	Burns Beach	2017–present
Kim Giddens	Labor	Bateman	2021–present
Emily Hamilton	Labor	Joondalup	2017–present
Meredith Hammat	Labor	Mirrabooka	2021–present
Jodie Hanns	Labor	Collie-Preston	2021–present
Terry Healy	Labor	Southern River	2017–present
Dr. David Honey	Liberal	Cottesloe	2018–2025
Matthew Hughes	Labor	Kalamunda	2017–2025
Bill Johnston	Labor	Cannington	2008–2025
Hugh Jones	Labor	Darling Range	2021–present
Dave Kelly	Labor	Bassendean	2013–present
Jane Kelsbie	Labor	Warren-Blackwood	2021–2025
Ali Kent	Labor	Kalgoorlie	2021–present
Jags Krishnan	Labor	Riverton	2021–present
Paul Lilburne	Labor	Carine	2021–2025
Shane Love	National	Moore	2013–present
Magenta Marshall^{[2]}	Labor	Rockingham	2023–present
Mark McGowan^{[2]}	Labor	Rockingham	1996–2023
Simone McGurk	Labor	Fremantle	2013–present
Libby Mettam	Liberal	Vasse	2014–present
David Michael	Labor	Balcatta	2017–present
Kevin Michel	Labor	Pilbara	2017–present
Simon Millman	Labor	Mount Lawley	2017–2025
Yaz Mubarakai	Labor	Jandakot	2017–present
Lisa Munday	Labor	Dawesville	2021–present
Lisa O'Malley	Labor	Bicton	2017–present
Paul Papalia	Labor	Warnbro	2007–2026
Stephen Price	Labor	Forrestfield	2017–present
Don Punch	Labor	Bunbury	2017–present
John Quigley	Labor	Butler	2001–2025
Margaret Quirk	Labor	Landsdale	2001–2025
Michelle Roberts	Labor	Midland	1994–2025
Cassie Rowe	Labor	Belmont	2017–present
Peter Rundle	National	Roe	2017–present
Rita Saffioti	Labor	West Swan	2008–present
Amber-Jade Sanderson	Labor	Morley	2017–present
David Scaife	Labor	Cockburn	2021–present
Jessica Shaw	Labor	Swan Hills	2017–2025
Rebecca Stephens	Labor	Albany	2021–2025
Jessica Stojkovski	Labor	Kingsley	2017–present
Katrina Stratton	Labor	Nedlands	2021–2025
Chris Tallentire	Labor	Thornlie	2008–2025
David Templeman	Labor	Mandurah	2001–2025
Peter Tinley	Labor	Willagee	2009–2025
Christine Tonkin	Labor	Churchlands	2021–2025
Reece Whitby	Labor	Baldivis	2017–present
Sabine Winton	Labor	Wanneroo	2017–present

^{1} Vince Catania resigned on 8 August 2022. A by-election to replace him was held on 17 September 2022, in which Merome Beard was elected.
^{2} Mark McGowan resigned on 8 June 2023. A by-election to replace him was held on 29 July 2023, in which Magenta Marshall was elected.
