= 2029 Western Australian state election =

- 10 March 2029 (Note: According to the Electoral Act 1907 (WA), all elections are held on the second Saturday of March, which is 10 March 2029.)

All 59 seats in the Western Australian Legislative Assembly and all 37 members in the Western Australian Legislative Council 30 Assembly seats are needed for a majority
- Opinion polls
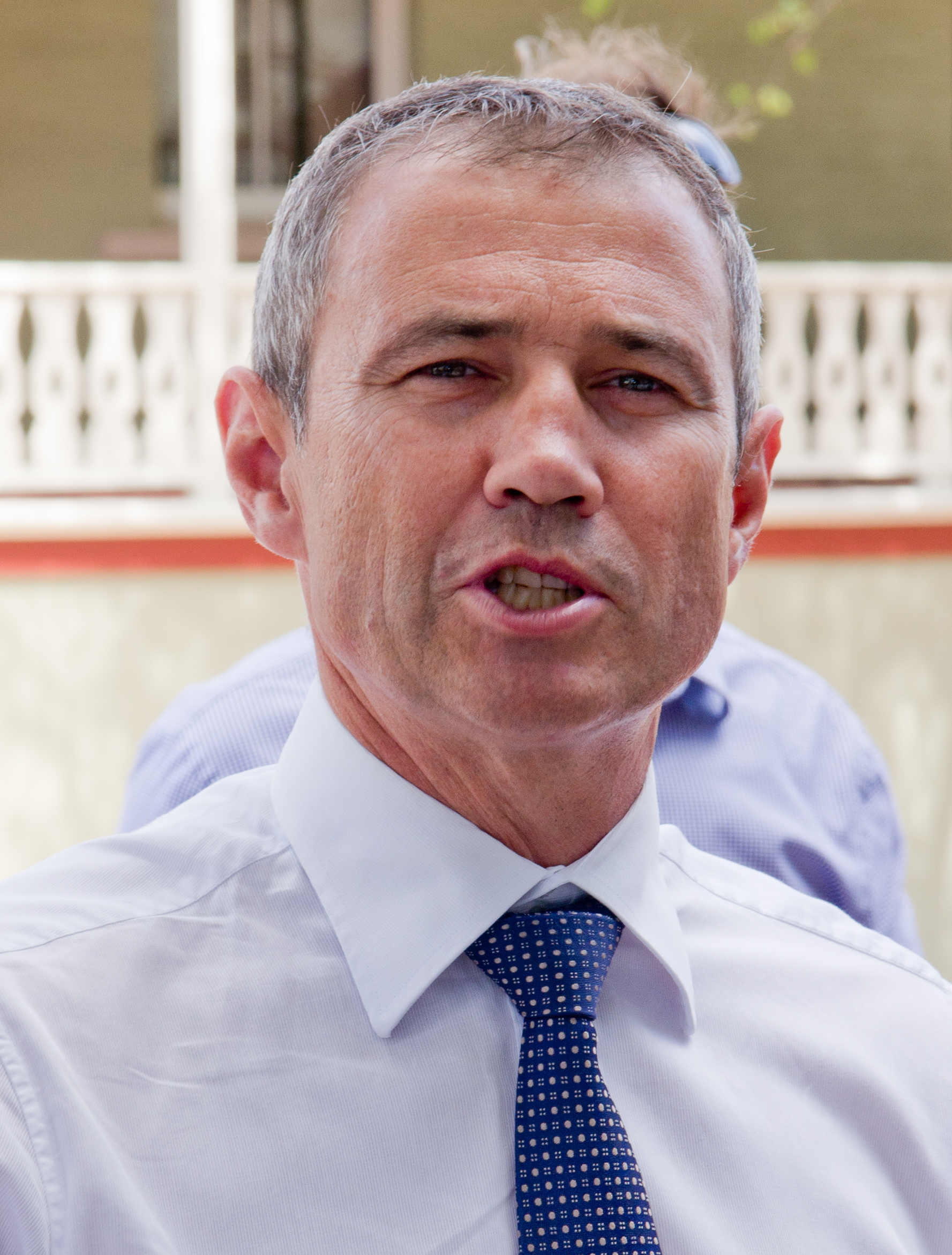

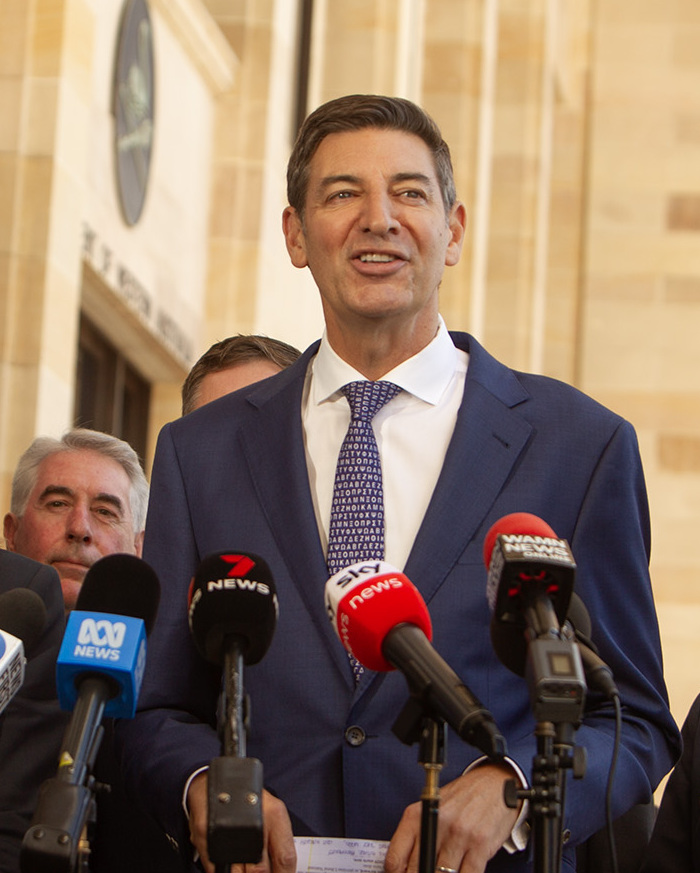

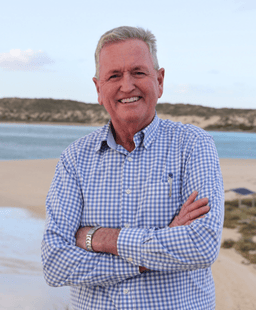
Leader	Roger Cook	Basil Zempilas	Shane Love
Party	Labor	Liberal	National
Leader since	6 June 2023	25 March 2025	30 January 2023
Leader's seat	Kwinana	Churchlands	Mid-West
Last election	46 seats	7 seats	6 seats
Current seats	45 (Note: The district of Secret Harbour was lost to One Nation at the by-election on 30 August following the resignation of former minister Paul Papalia.)	6 (Note: In June 2026, Jonathan Huston (MLA for Nedlands) left the Liberal Party and became an independent.)	6
Seats needed	Steady	▲24	▲24
Incumbent Premier
Roger Cook
Labor

The 2029 Western Australian state election is to be held on 10 March 2029, where all 59 seats in the Legislative Assembly and 37 members in the Legislative Council will be contested.

== Background ==
The 2025 Western Australian state election saw Labor win one of the largest majorities of any state or territory government, despite losing some seats from the previous election.

The Liberal Party barely regained opposition status from the National Party, with seven seats compared to the latter's six.

After the election, the leader of the Liberal Party leading to the 2025 state election, Libby Mettam resigned, citing that she did not have the support of her party room to continue as leader. This triggered a leadership election, where Basil Zempilas, who was elected in the 2025 election, and the former Lord Mayor of Perth was elected leader unopposed, with Mettam being elected as the Deputy Leader unopposed.

== Electoral system ==
Candidates are elected to single-member seats in the Legislative Assembly via full-preferential instant-runoff voting. In the Legislative Council, MLCs are elected on a single statewide ballot by Single Transferable Vote. Votes are cast under a semi-optional preferential form of STV using above-the-line voting. It requires electors to mark preferences for one or more preferred parties above the dividing line on the ballot paper, or at least 20 candidates below the dividing line.

== Key dates ==
Elections are scheduled for the second Saturday of March every four years, in line with legislative changes made in 2011.

While the Legislative Assembly has fixed four-year terms, the Governor of Western Australia may still dissolve the Assembly and call an election early on the advice of the Premier.

== Electoral pendulums ==
=== Pre-election pendulum ===
This is the pre-election pendulum, based off the results of the 2025 state election unless noted otherwise.

Government seats
Marginal
Pilbara	Kevin Michel	ALP	0.6
Fremantle	Simone McGurk	ALP	0.8 v IND
Dawesville	Lisa Munday	ALP	1.3
Kalgoorlie	Ali Kent	ALP	1.6
South Perth	Geoff Baker	ALP	1.6
Bateman	Kim Giddens	ALP	3.3
Kingsley	Jessica Stojkovski	ALP	3.5
Forrestfield	Stephen Price	ALP	4.1
Riverton	Jags Krishnan	ALP	4.2
Collie-Preston	Jodie Hanns	ALP	4.3
Scarborough	Stuart Aubrey	ALP	5.0
Darling Range	Hugh Jones	ALP	5.1
Fairly safe
Joondalup	Emily Hamilton	ALP	6.3
Jandakot	Stephen Pratt	ALP	6.4
Bunbury	Don Punch	ALP	7.1
Swan Hills	Michelle Maynard	ALP	8.4
Bicton	Lisa O'Malley	ALP	9.3
Mandurah	Rhys Williams	ALP	9.5
Landsdale	Daniel Pastorelli	ALP	9.6
Safe
Hillarys	Caitlin Collins	ALP	10.1
Mount Lawley	Frank Paolino	ALP	10.7
Midland	Steve Catania	ALP	10.9
Mindarie	Mark Folkard	ALP	11.3
Rockingham	Magenta Marshall	ALP	11.8
Oakford	Yaz Mubarakai	ALP	11.9
Morley	Amber-Jade Sanderson	ALP	12.0
Wanneroo	Sabine Winton	ALP	12.5
Kimberley	Divina D'Anna	ALP	14.0
Thornlie	Colleen Egan	ALP	14.0 v IND
Bibra Lake	Sook Yee Lai	ALP	14.2 v GRN
Balcatta	David Michael	ALP	14.5
Butler	Lorna Clarke	ALP	14.7
Bassendean	Dave Kelly	ALP	15.7 v IND
Victoria Park	Hannah Beazley	ALP	16.7
Baldivis	Reece Whitby	ALP	16.7
Cockburn	David Scaife	ALP	17.8
Cannington	Ron Sao	ALP	17.9
Armadale	Tony Buti	ALP	18.9
Belmont	Cassie Rowe	ALP	19.4
Very safe
Perth	John Carey	ALP	21.0
West Swan	Rita Saffioti	ALP	21.2
Girrawheen	Meredith Hammat	ALP	21.3
Maylands	Dan Bull	ALP	22.5
Southern River	Terry Healy	ALP	23.4
Kwinana	Roger Cook	ALP	25.0

Non-government seats
Marginal
Kalamunda	Adam Hort	LIB	0.1
Churchlands	Basil Zempilas	LIB	1.1
Murray-Wellington	David Bolt	LIB	1.7
Cottesloe	Sandra Brewer	LIB	5.6 v IND
Fairly safe
Carine	Liam Staltari	LIB	7.6
Safe
Vasse	Libby Mettam	LIB	13.4
Crossbench seats
Warren-Blackwood	Bevan Eatts	NAT	1.8
Nedlands	Jonathan Huston	IND (Note: Huston was elected as a Liberal but defected in 2026.)	2.7 v ALP
Albany	Scott Leary	NAT	6.3
Secret Harbour	Luke Herdegen	ONP	7.1 v ALP (Note: Result of the 2026 Secret Harbour state by-election. The seat was won by Labor in 2025 on a margin of 11.5 against the Liberals.)
Mid-West	Shane Love	NAT	13.7 v LIB
Geraldton	Kirrilee Warr	NAT	14.1
Central Wheatbelt	Lachlan Hunter	NAT	23.3
Roe	Peter Rundle	NAT	25.1 v LIB

== Opinion polling ==
=== Voting intention ===
A graph showing the primary vote opinion polls leading up to the 2029 Western Australian election

Date	Polling firm	Sample size	Primary vote						2PP vote	
Date	Polling firm	Sample size	ALP	LIB	NAT	GRN	ONP	Others	ALP	LIB
6–25 Aug 2026	DemosAU	990	33%	21%	4%	12%	21%	9%	54%	46%
29 May – 11 Jun 2026	DemosAU	1,015	33%	23%	3%	12%	18%	11%	53%	47%
12–23 Feb 2026	DemosAU	969	36%	21%	4%	13%	17%	9%	57%	43%
10–26 Nov 2025	DemosAU	1,012	41%	30%	6%	13%	—N/a	10%	56%	44%
8 March 2025	8 March 2025 election	—	41.4%	28.0%	5.2%	11.1%	4.0%	10.3%	57.1%	42.9%

=== Preferred Premier ===
Date	Polling firm	Sample size	Preferred premier		
Date	Polling firm	Sample size	Cook	Zempilas	Unsure
6–25 Aug 2026	DemosAU	990	46%	32%	22%
29 May – 11 Jun 2026	DemosAU	1,015	44%	33%	23%
12–23 Feb 2026	DemosAU	969	43%	30%	27%
10–26 Nov 2025	DemosAU	1,012	47%	34%	19%
