= Electoral results for the district of North West Central =

Western Australian district election results

This is a list of electoral results for the electoral district of North West Central in Western Australian state elections.

== Members ==
North West Coastal (2005–2008)
Member	Party	Term
Fred Riebeling	Labor	2005–2008
North West (2008–2013)
Member	Party	Term
Vince Catania	Labor	2008–2009
Vince Catania	National	2009–2013
North West Central (2013–present)
Member	Party	Term
Vince Catania	National	2013–2022
Merome Beard	National	2022–2023
Merome Beard	Liberal	2023–2025

== Election results ==
=== Elections in the 2020s ===
2022 North West Central state by-election
Party	Candidate	Votes	%	±%
National	Merome Beard	2,042	40.2	+0.4
Liberal	Will Baston	1,353	26.6	+18.7
Greens	Niels Glahn-Bertelsen	635	12.5	+8.4
Legalise Cannabis	Leanne Lockyer	269	5.3	+5.3
Western Australia	Andrea Randle	202	4.0	+4.0
One Nation	Gerald Laurent	197	3.9	+0.9
Western Australia	Anthony Fels	108	2.1	+2.1
No Mandatory Vaccination	Aaron Horsman	82	1.6	+0.6
Independent	Peter Dunne	55	1.1	+1.1
Small Business	Peter Baker	55	1.1	+1.1
Independent	Tony Stokes	44	0.9	+0.9
Liberal Democrats	Jake McCoull	42	0.8	+0.8
Total formal votes		5,084	95.3	−0.2
Informal votes		251	4.7	+0.2
Turnout		5,335	47.7	
Two-candidate-preferred result
National	Merome Beard	3,071	60.5	+8.8
Liberal	Will Baston	2,008	39.5	+39.5
National hold				

2021 Western Australian state election: North West Central
Party	Candidate	Votes	%	±%
Labor	Cherie Sibosado	3,114	40.2	+13.5
National	Vince Catania	3,075	39.7	+3.6
Liberal	Alys McKeough	611	7.9	−7.9
Greens	Sandy Burt	318	4.1	−1.5
Shooters, Fishers, Farmers	Stefan Colagiuri	233	3.0	+2.6
One Nation	Robert Tonkin	232	3.0	−8.4
No Mandatory Vaccination	A. Agyputri	81	1.0	+1.0
Independent	Henry Seddon	40	0.5	+0.5
WAxit	Brendan McKay	37	0.5	+0.2
Total formal votes		7,741	95.5	+0.1
Informal votes		367	4.5	−0.1
Turnout		8,108	73.8	−5.5
Two-candidate-preferred result
National	Vince Catania	3,997	51.7	−8.4
Labor	Cherie Sibosado	3,738	48.3	+8.4
National hold		Swing	−8.4	

=== Elections in the 2010s ===
2017 Western Australian state election: North West Central
Party	Candidate	Votes	%	±%
National	Vince Catania	2,571	35.3	−7.5
Labor	Shane Hill	1,979	27.1	+4.4
Liberal	Julee Westcott	1,179	16.2	−11.8
One Nation	Dane Sorensen	818	11.2	+11.2
Greens	Carol Green	426	5.8	+0.8
Independent	Sandy Davies	221	3.0	+3.0
Flux the System!	Adrian D'Cunha	73	1.0	+1.0
Micro Business	Angela Hooper	24	0.3	+0.3
Total formal votes		7,291	95.4	+1.6
Informal votes		349	4.6	−1.6
Turnout		7,640	73.2	−6.4
Two-party-preferred result
National	Vince Catania	4,337	59.5	−1.9
Labor	Shane Hill	2,947	40.5	+1.9
National hold		Swing	−1.9	

2013 Western Australian state election: North West Central
Party	Candidate	Votes	%	±%
National	Vince Catania	3,235	44.2	+21.4
Liberal	Tami Maitre	2,114	28.9	–0.4
Labor	Jennifer Shelton	1,523	20.8	–11.9
Greens	Des Pike	364	5.0	–0.9
Christians	Andrew Eddison	86	1.2	+1.2
Total formal votes		7262	94.1	–1.5
Informal votes		454	5.9	+1.5
Turnout		7,716	79.3	
Two-party-preferred result
Liberal	Tami Maitre	4,611	63.5	+10.2
Labor	Jennifer Shelton	2,649	36.5	–10.2
Two-candidate-preferred result
National	Vince Catania	4,334	59.7	+59.7
Liberal	Tami Maitre	2,925	40.3	–13.0
National hold		Swing	+59.3	

=== Elections in the 2000s ===
2008 Western Australian state election: North West
Party	Candidate	Votes	%	±%
Labor	Vince Catania	4,161	36.2	−7.4
Liberal	Rod Sweetman	3,071	26.7	−10.4
National	Tom Day	2,609	22.7	+22.7
Greens	Peter Shaw	840	7.3	+2.4
Independent	Lex Fullarton	828	7.2	−3.0
Total formal votes		11,509	95.7	+0.4
Informal votes		520	4.3	−0.4
Turnout		12,029	75.4	
Two-party-preferred result
Labor	Vince Catania	6,103	53.1	+0.0
Liberal	Rod Sweetman	5,384	46.9	+0.0
Labor hold		Swing	+0.0	

2005 Western Australian state election: North West Coastal
Party	Candidate	Votes	%	±%
Labor	Fred Riebeling	4,870	43.9	+0.5
Liberal	David Hay	4,004	36.1	+2.3
Independent	Lex Fullarton	1,230	11.1	+8.2
Greens	Peter Shaw	546	4.9	−1.0
Christian Democrats	Paul Pleysier	251	2.3	+2.3
One Nation	Bob Hodgkinson	182	1.6	−12.0
Total formal votes		11,083	95.3	−0.9
Informal votes		552	4.7	+0.9
Turnout		11,635	80.1	
Two-party-preferred result
Labor	Fred Riebeling	5,950	53.7	−1.7
Liberal	David Hay	5,120	46.3	+1.7
Labor hold		Swing	−1.7	
