= Electoral results for the district of Mid-West =

Western Australian district election results

This is a list of electoral results for the district of Mid-West in Western Australian state elections.

The seat was created at the 2023 redistribution as the successor to the large but lowly populated rural electorates of Moore and North West Central.

It was first contested at the 2025 state election and notionally held by the National Party on an 8.6% margin.

== Members ==
Member	Party	Term
Shane Love	National	2025–present

== Election results ==
=== Elections in the 2020s ===
==== 2025 ====
2025 Western Australian state election: Mid-West
Party	Candidate	Votes	%	±%
National	Shane Love	8,464	42.9	+4.2
Liberal	Merome Beard	4,563	23.1	+6.6
Labor	Jenna Denton	3,362	17.1	−16.7
One Nation	Mark Douglas Burns	1,218	6.2	+3.6
Greens	Chilla Bulbeck	845	4.3	+1.6
Legalise Cannabis	Shannon Yeh	650	3.3	+3.3
Christians	Mike Reymond	401	2.0	+2.0
Libertarian	Chrystal Sclater	214	1.1	+1.1
Total formal votes		19,717	95.8	−0.3
Informal votes		864	4.2	+0.3
Turnout		20,581	84.4	+1.6
Two-candidate-preferred result
National	Shane Love	12,551	63.7	+5.1
Liberal	Merome Beard	7,140	36.3	+36.3
National hold				
