= Electoral results for the district of Central Wheatbelt =

Western Australian district election results

This is a list of electoral results for the electoral district of Central Wheatbelt in Western Australian state elections.

== Members for Central Wheatbelt ==
Member	Party	Term
Brendon Grylls	National	2008–2013
Mia Davies	National	2013–2025
Lachlan Hunter	National	2025–present

== Election results ==
=== Elections in the 2020s ===
2025 Western Australian state election: Central Wheatbelt
Party	Candidate	Votes	%	±%
National	Lachlan Hunter	12,417	46.7	+1.3
Labor	Rebecca Atkinson	5,314	20.0	−14.8
Liberal	Lance French	3,928	14.8	+5.8
One Nation	Peter Lines	2,475	9.3	+7.3
Greens	Peter Stephen Leam	1,447	5.4	+3.2
Christians	Les Holten	1,030	3.9	+2.2
Total formal votes		26,611	96.5	+0.6
Informal votes		976	3.5	−0.6
Turnout		27,587	85.8	+4.1
Two-candidate-preferred result
National	Lachlan Hunter	19,490	73.3	+14.1
Labor	Rebecca Atkinson	7,096	26.7	−14.1
National hold		Swing	+14.1	

2021 Western Australian state election: Central Wheatbelt
Party	Candidate	Votes	%	±%
National	Mia Davies	10,101	47.5	+1.4
Labor	Michelle Nelson	7,191	33.8	+14.3
Liberal	Rob Forster	1,762	8.3	−3.3
Shooters, Fishers, Farmers	Stuart Singleton	739	3.5	−1.8
Christians	Dennis Pease	427	2.0	−0.1
One Nation	Shaun Reid	405	1.9	−9.6
Greens	Annabelle Newbury	388	1.8	−1.3
No Mandatory Vaccination	Brendon Cahill	179	0.8	+0.8
WAxit	Estelle Gom	70	0.3	+0.3
Total formal votes		21,262	95.8	−0.3
Informal votes		938	4.2	+0.3
Turnout		22,200	85.8	−3.9
Two-candidate-preferred result
National	Mia Davies	12,901	60.7	−11.5
Labor	Michelle Nelson	8,357	39.3	+11.5
National hold		Swing	−11.5	

=== Elections in the 2010s ===
2017 Western Australian state election: Central Wheatbelt
Party	Candidate	Votes	%	±%
National	Mia Davies	10,489	47.1	+2.6
Labor	Gary Templeman	4,297	19.3	+2.3
One Nation	Shaun Reid	2,571	11.5	+11.5
Liberal	Bill Crabtree	2,496	11.2	−20.0
Shooters, Fishers, Farmers	Diff Reynders	1,158	5.2	+5.2
Greens	Audrey Foote	684	3.1	−0.4
Christians	Dennis Pease	448	2.0	+0.3
Independent	Estelle Gom	150	0.7	+0.7
Total formal votes		22,293	95.9	+1.2
Informal votes		954	4.1	−1.2
Turnout		23,247	88.3	−1.9
Two-party-preferred result
National	Mia Davies	16,166	72.6	+13.6
Labor	Gary Templeman	6,111	27.4	+27.4
National hold		Swing	+13.6	

2013 Western Australian state election: Central Wheatbelt
Party	Candidate	Votes	%	±%
National	Mia Davies	8,414	43.6	–5.9
Liberal	Stephen Strange	6,088	31.5	+6.6
Labor	John Watters	3,375	17.5	+1.5
Greens	Tricia Walters	637	3.3	–2.2
Independent	Gerald Sturman	474	2.5	+2.5
Christians	Bob Adair	328	1.7	–1.5
Total formal votes		19,316	94.7	–1.4
Turnout		1,076	5.3	+1.4
Turnout		20,392	90.6	
Two-party-preferred result
Liberal	Stephen Strange	13,729	71.1	–0.2
Labor	John Watters	5,573	28.9	+0.2
Two-candidate-preferred result
National	Mia Davies	11,168	57.9	–10.9
Liberal	Stephen Strange	8,110	42.1	+10.9
National hold		Swing	–10.9	

=== Elections in the 2000s ===
2008 Western Australian state election: Central Wheatbelt
Party	Candidate	Votes	%	±%
National	Brendon Grylls	8,334	47.79	−7.1
Liberal	Stephen Strange	4,471	25.64	+11.9
Labor	Gerry Sturman	2,909	16.68	+1.7
Greens	Yvonne Dols	996	5.71	+1.5
Christian Democrats	Ross Patterson	573	3.29	+0.9
Citizens Electoral Council	Judy Sudholz	155	0.89	+0.89
Total formal votes		17,438	96.01	
Informal votes		724	3.99	
Turnout		18,162	88.63	
Two-candidate-preferred result
National	Brendon Grylls	11,806	67.92	N/A
Liberal	Stephen Strange	5,577	32.08	N/A
National hold		Swing	N/A	
