= Mia Davies shadow ministry =

The Davies shadow ministry was the shadow ministry led by Mia Davies in the Parliament of Western Australia.

== Ministry ==
Following the 2021 election, the Liberal Party and Nationals Party entered into a formal alliance to form opposition, with National Party being the senior party and the Liberal Party being the junior party in the alliance. Shadow ministerial positions were also held by parliamentary members of both parties. This was similar to the agreements between both parties when they were in government following the 2008 and 2013 elections. Similar to the 2008 and 2013 agreements, the deputy leader of the senior party, Nationals deputy leader Shane Love, was the deputy opposition leader, instead of the leader of the junior party, Liberal Party leader David Honey. Under the alliance, each party maintained their independence, and could speak out on issues when there was a disagreement with their partner.

Shadow Minister	Portfolio	Image
Hon. Mia Davies MLA	Leader of the Opposition; Shadow Minister for: Regional Development; Finance; Electoral Affairs; Federal-State Relations; Public Sector Management; Jobs & Trade; Regional Cities (since 2021); Women's Interests (2021–2022); Leader of the National Party	
Shane Love MLA	Deputy Leader of the Opposition; Shadow Minister for: Transport; Mines & Petroleum; Climate Action; Local Government (since 2021); Deputy Leader of the National Party	
Hon. Colin de Grussa MLC	Deputy Leader of the Opposition in the Legislative Council; Opposition Whip in the Legislative Council; Shadow Minister for: Agriculture and Food; Fisheries; Ports; Veterans Issues; Leader of the National Party in the Legislative Council	
Peter Rundle MLA	Shadow Minister for: Education & Training; Sports & Recreation; Racing & Gaming	
Hon. Martin Aldridge MLC	Shadow Minister for: Emergency Services; Regional Health; Road Safety; Volunteering; Regional Communications; Deputy Leader of the National Party in the Legislative Council	
Dr. David Honey MLA	Shadow Minister for: State Development; Energy; Hydrogen; Science; Innovation and ICT; Water (since 2021); Leader of the WA Liberal Party	
Libby Mettam MLA	Shadow Minister for: Health; Mental Health; Disability Services; Prevention of Family & Domestic Violence; Deputy Leader of the WA Liberal Party	
Hon. Steve Thomas MLC	Leader of the Opposition in the Legislative Council; Shadow Minister for Treasury; Shadow Minister for Small Business; Leader of the WA Liberal Party in the Legislative Council	
Hon. Tjorn Sibma MLC	Shadow Minister for: Environment; MetroNet; Defence Industry; Citizenship and Multicultural Affairs; Deputy Leader of the WA Liberal Party in the Legislative Council	
Hon. Donna Faragher MLC	Shadow Minister for: Community Services; Early Childhood Learning; Youth; Seniors and Ageing	
Hon. Nick Goiran MLC	Shadow Attorney-General; Shadow Minister for Child Protection; Shadow Minister for Industrial Relations	
Hon. Peter Collier MLC	Shadow Minister for Police and Corrective Services; Shadow Minister for Culture and the Arts	
Hon. Neil Thomson MLC	Shadow Minister for: Planning; Lands; Heritage	
Hon. Steve Martin MLC	Shadow Minister for Housing and Forestry	
Merome Beard MLA	Shadow Minister for: Tourism (since 2022); Commerce (since 2022); Women's Interests (since 2022)	

=== Former members ===
Vince Catania and James Hayward were members of the Shadow Cabinet following the 2021 election. In December 2021, Hayward resigned from the National Party following him being charged with child sex offences. In June 2022, Catania announced his intention to resign from parliament in August to spend more time with his family. He tendered his resignation to the speaker on 8 August.

Shadow Minister	Portfolio
James Hayward MLC	Shadow Minister for: Local Government (2021); Water (2021); Regional Cities (2021)
Vince Catania MLA	Shadow Minister for: Tourism (2021–2022); Commerce (2021–2022); Aboriginal Affairs (2021–2022); Government Accountability (2021–2022)

== See also ==
- Opposition (Australia)
- Leader of the Opposition (Western Australia)
