= Electoral results for the district of Baldivis =

Western Australian district election results

This is a list of electoral results for the electoral district of Baldivis in Western Australian state elections.

== Members for Baldivis ==
Member	Party	Term
Reece Whitby	Labor	2017–present

== Election results ==
=== Elections in the 2020s ===
2025 Western Australian state election: Baldivis
Party	Candidate	Votes	%	±%
Labor	Reece Whitby	12,546	50.7	−28.4
Liberal	Dylan Mbano	5,193	21.0	+11.9
Greens	Annabelle Newbury	2,491	10.1	+6.4
One Nation	Dylan Vermeulen	2,023	8.2	+6.0
Legalise Cannabis	Mark Charles	1,285	5.2	+5.2
Christians	Yvette Holmes	739	3.0	+3.0
Shooters, Fishers, Farmers	Phillip Da Silva	460	1.9	+1.9
Total formal votes		24,737	95.2	−1.3
Informal votes		1,252	4.8	+1.3
Turnout		25,989	83.6	+4.8
Two-party-preferred result
Labor	Reece Whitby	16,480	66.7	−19.1
Liberal	Dylan Mbano	8,240	33.3	+19.1
Labor hold		Swing	−19.1	

Results are not final. Last updated on 27 March 2025 at 7:00 PM AWST

2021 Western Australian state election: Baldivis
Party	Candidate	Votes	%	±%
Labor	Reece Whitby	21,130	79.8	+37.0
Liberal	Luke Derrick	2,122	8.0	−6.4
Greens	Jody Freeman	1,037	3.9	−1.3
Independent	Andrea Tokaji	932	3.5	+3.5
One Nation	Martin Suter	464	1.8	−5.8
No Mandatory Vaccination	Chaz Rizzo	333	1.3	+1.3
Liberal Democrats	David Marshall	321	1.2	+1.2
WAxit	Brianna McLernon	149	0.6	+0.6
Total formal votes		26,488	96.6	+1.0
Informal votes		924	3.4	−1.0
Turnout		27,412	84.2	+10.9
Two-party-preferred result
Labor	Reece Whitby	23,013	86.9	+20.3
Liberal	Luke Derrick	3,469	13.1	−20.3
Labor hold		Swing	+20.3	

=== Elections in the 2010s ===
2017 Western Australian state election: Baldivis
Party	Candidate	Votes	%	±%
Labor	Reece Whitby	11,339	45.3	+1.8
Independent	Matt Whitfield	5,346	21.4	+21.4
Liberal	Malcolm George	3,571	14.3	−18.8
One Nation	John Zurakowski	1,854	7.4	+7.4
Greens	Christine Fegebank	1,412	5.6	−0.8
Christians	Yvette Holmes	614	2.5	+0.3
Independent	Craig Hamersley	390	1.6	+1.6
Micro Business	Prabhpreet Makkar	249	1.0	+1.0
Independent	Kath Summers	237	0.9	+0.9
Total formal votes		25,012	95.5	+1.8
Informal votes		1,188	4.5	−1.8
Turnout		26,200	85.1	+12.7
Two-party-preferred result
Labor	Reece Whitby	16,987	67.9	+11.5
Liberal	Malcolm George	8,023	32.1	−11.5
Two-candidate-preferred result
Labor	Reece Whitby	14,306	57.2	+0.8
Independent	Matt Whitfield	10,695	42.8	+42.8
Labor hold				
