= Electoral results for the district of Ningaloo =

Western Australian district election results

This is a list of electoral results for the Electoral district of Ningaloo in Western Australian elections.

== Members for Ningaloo ==
Member	Party	Term
Rod Sweetman	Liberal	1996–2005

== Election results ==
=== Elections in the 2000s ===
2001 Western Australian state election: Ningaloo
Party	Candidate	Votes	%	±%
Liberal	Rod Sweetman	3,059	38.2	+2.2
Labor	Samantha Ogden	2,666	33.3	−8.3
One Nation	John Cope	1,263	15.8	+15.8
Independent	Lex Fullarton	517	6.5	+6.5
Greens	John Blinkhorn	396	4.9	−1.5
Democrats	Marcus Lindsay	103	1.3	−1.2
Total formal votes		8,004	96.5	+0.4
Informal votes		289	3.5	−0.4
Turnout		8,293	82.1	
Two-party-preferred result
Liberal	Rod Sweetman	4,157	52.4	+1.7
Labor	Samantha Ogden	3,781	47.6	−1.7
Liberal hold		Swing	+1.7	

=== Elections in the 1990s ===
1996 Western Australian state election: Ningaloo
Party	Candidate	Votes	%	±%
Labor	Kevin Leahy	3,621	41.6	−3.8
Liberal	Rod Sweetman	3,133	36.0	−3.7
National	Margaret Day	1,175	13.5	+6.4
Greens	John Blinkhorn	557	6.4	+1.5
Democrats	Douglas Bearham	218	2.5	+0.8
Total formal votes		8,704	96.2	−0.1
Informal votes		348	3.8	+0.1
Turnout		9,052	83.0	
Two-party-preferred result
Liberal	Rod Sweetman	4,407	50.7	+1.9
Labor	Kevin Leahy	4,288	49.3	−1.9
Liberal gain from Labor		Swing	+1.9	
