= 2022 North West Central state by-election =

- 17 September 2022
- Registered: 11,189
- Turnout: 42.2%

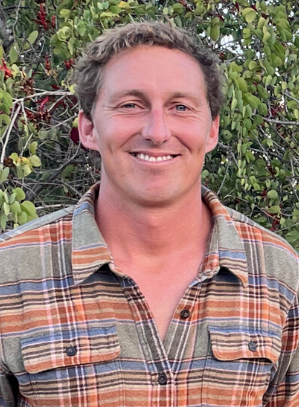
	First party	Second party	Third party
Candidate	Merome Beard	Will Baston	Niels Glahn-Bertelsen
Party	National	Liberal	Greens
Popular vote	2,042	1,353	635
Percentage	40.2%	26.6%	12.5%
Swing	▲0.4	▲18.7	▲8.4
2CP	60.5%	39.5%
2CP change	▲8.8	▲39.5
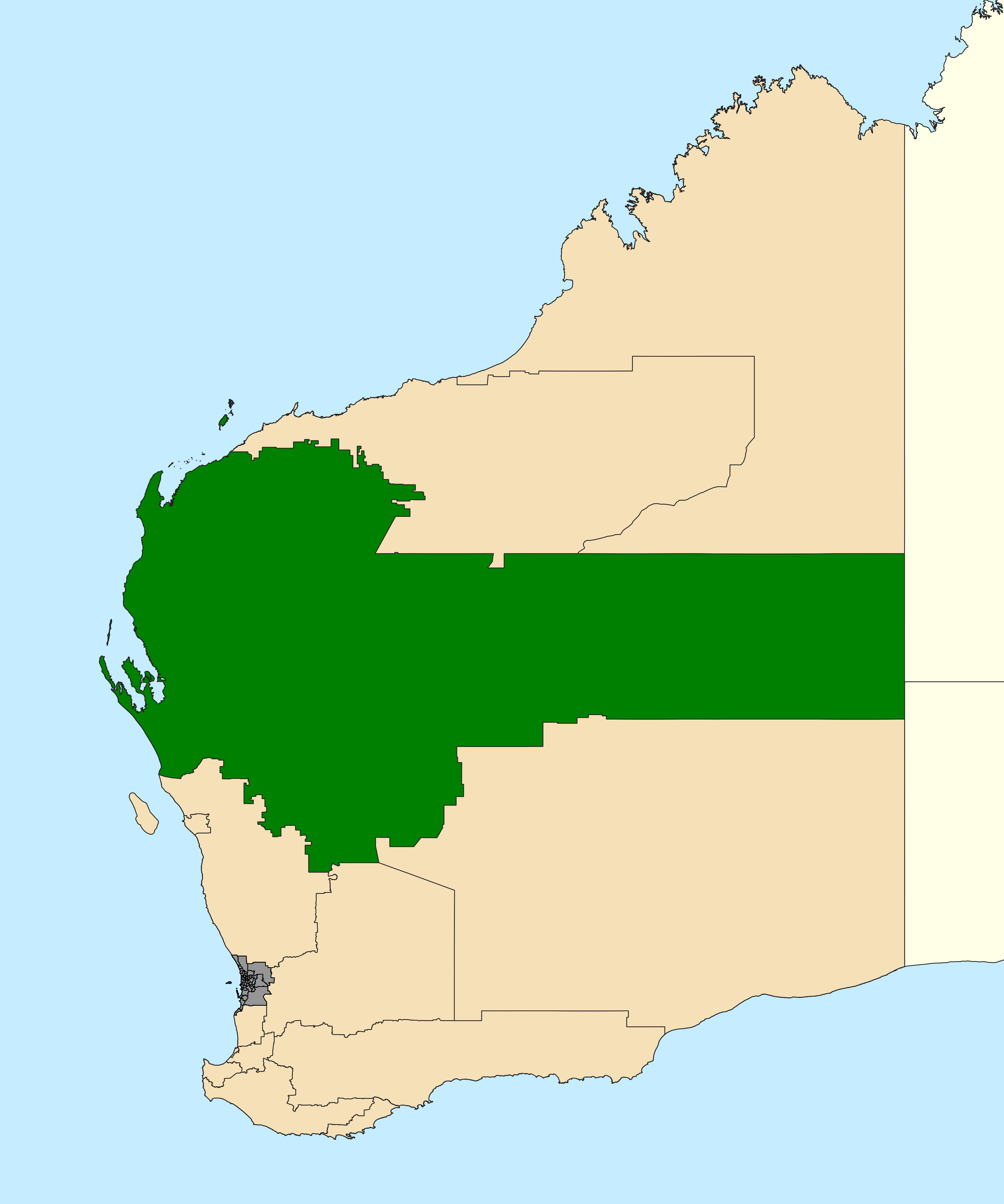
- Map showing the electoral district of North West Central within Western Australia
MP before election
Vince Catania
National
Elected MP
Merome Beard
National

A by-election for the electoral district of North West Central in Western Australia took place on 17 September 2022 following the resignation of the sitting member, Nationals MP Vince Catania, on 8 August 2022. The election was won by National Party candidate Merome Beard.

== Background ==
Vince Catania was initially elected to the electoral district of North West Central in 2008 as a Labor Party candidate, but he defected to the National Party in 2009. He had since won the 2013, 2017 and 2021 state elections as a National Party candidate. His margin at the 2021 election was only 259 votes, making it one of the closest seats in the state. In June 2022, Catania announced his intention to resign from Parliament in August 2022. At the time, he was one of four National Party members in the Legislative Assembly. As the Liberal Party only had two members in the Legislative Assembly, the National Party was the senior party in the opposition alliance.

Catania tendered his resignation to the speaker on 8 August 2022. The election was scheduled to occur on 17 September 2022.

== Candidates ==
The National Party chose Carnarvon hotel and pub owner Merome Beard as their candidate in late June. She was the only person nominated for preselection.

The Liberal Party chose Will Baston as their candidate on 13 July. He is the nephew of Barnett government minister Ken Baston and manager of the family's Jimba Jimba Station, a cattle station 150 kilometres (93 mi) east of Carnarvon. He was the only person nominated for preselection. If he were to win the by-election, the National and Liberal parties would have three seats each, making it unclear which party would be the opposition party. The opposition leader and deputy opposition leader are determined by who is the leader and deputy leader of the opposition party. The opposition party also gets additional staff and resources. There is no known precedent or tiebreaker for when multiple parties have the same number of seats.

Labor was yet to decide if it will put forward a candidate as of mid-July, with there being little upside to winning considering the party already had 53 out of 59 seats in the Legislative Assembly. Premier Mark McGowan was opposed to fielding a candidate, whereas cabinet minister Alannah MacTiernan was strongly in favour. By 8 August, Labor had decided not to field a candidate, with McGowan saying that by-elections historically have been difficult for governments to win. Out of the 11 by-elections from 2008 to 2022, incumbent governments have not contested five. The opposition used Labor's lack of candidacy to suggest that the government doesn't care about regional areas.

The Greens preselected Exmouth local Niels Glahn-Bertelsen, an educator and environmentalist.

In total, there are 12 candidates, a record number for North West Central. Out of those candidates, three live in the electorate: Beard, Baston and Glahn-Bertelsen. The full list of candidates, in ballot order, is as follows:

Party	Candidate
The Greens (WA)	Niels Glahn-Bertelsen
Western Australia Party	Andrea Randle
Small Business Party	Peter Baker
The Nationals	Merome Beard
Pauline Hanson's One Nation	Gerald Laurent
Legalise Cannabis Western Australia Party	Leanne Lockyer
Liberal Democrats	Jake Adkins McCoull
Western Australia Party	Anthony Fels
No Mandatory Vaccination	Aaron Horsman
Independent	Peter D Dunne
Independent	Tony Stokes
Liberal Party	Will Baston

== Election results ==
2022 North West Central state by-election
Party	Candidate	Votes	%	±%
National	Merome Beard	2,042	40.2	+0.4
Liberal	Will Baston	1,353	26.6	+18.7
Greens	Niels Glahn-Bertelsen	635	12.5	+8.4
Legalise Cannabis	Leanne Lockyer	269	5.3	+5.3
Western Australia	Andrea Randle	202	4.0	+4.0
One Nation	Gerald Laurent	197	3.9	+0.9
Western Australia	Anthony Fels	108	2.1	+2.1
No Mandatory Vaccination	Aaron Horsman	82	1.6	+0.6
Independent	Peter Dunne	55	1.1	+1.1
Small Business	Peter Baker	55	1.1	+1.1
Independent	Tony Stokes	44	0.9	+0.9
Liberal Democrats	Jake McCoull	42	0.8	+0.8
Total formal votes		5,084	95.3	−0.2
Informal votes		251	4.7	+0.2
Turnout		5,335	47.7	
Two-candidate-preferred result
National	Merome Beard	3,071	60.5	+8.8
Liberal	Will Baston	2,008	39.5	+39.5
National hold				

=== Previous ===
2021 Western Australian state election: North West Central
Party	Candidate	Votes	%	±%
Labor	Cherie Sibosado	3,114	40.2	+13.5
National	Vince Catania	3,075	39.7	+3.6
Liberal	Alys McKeough	611	7.9	−7.9
Greens	Sandy Burt	318	4.1	−1.5
Shooters, Fishers, Farmers	Stefan Colagiuri	233	3.0	+2.6
One Nation	Robert Tonkin	232	3.0	−8.4
No Mandatory Vaccination	A. Agyputri	81	1.0	+1.0
Independent	Henry Seddon	40	0.5	+0.5
WAxit	Brendan McKay	37	0.5	+0.2
Total formal votes		7,741	95.5	+0.1
Informal votes		367	4.5	−0.1
Turnout		8,108	73.8	−5.5
Two-candidate-preferred result
National	Vince Catania	3,997	51.7	−8.4
Labor	Cherie Sibosado	3,738	48.3	+8.4
National hold		Swing	−8.4	
