= Electoral district of Ningaloo =

Former electoral district of Western Australia

Ningaloo Western Australia—Legislative Assembly
- State: Western Australia
- Dates current: 1996–2005
- Namesake: Ningaloo Reef
- Area: 437,927 km^{2} (169,084.6 sq mi)

Ningaloo was an electoral district of the Legislative Assembly in the Australian state of Western Australia from 1996 to 2005.

The district was based in the rural north-west of Western Australia. Its population centres included Carnarvon, Cue, Denham, Exmouth, Gascoyne Junction, Meekatharra, Mount Magnet, Murchison, Nanutarra, Newman, Sandstone and Yalgoo.

== History ==
Ningaloo was first created for the 1996 state election and was abolished ahead of the 2005 state election. The district was represented by Liberal MP Rod Sweetman for its entire two terms.

At its abolition, Ningaloo's territory was divided between the new districts of Murchison-Eyre and North West Coastal.

== Members for Ningaloo ==
Member	Party	Term
Rod Sweetman	Liberal	1996–2005
