= Electoral district of Secret Harbour =

Electoral district of the Western Australian Legislative Assembly

Secret Harbour Western Australia—Legislative Assembly
- Interactive map of district boundaries from the 2025 state election
- State: Western Australia
- Created: 2023
- MP: Luke Herdegen
- Party: One Nation
- Namesake: Secret Harbour
- Electors: 34,284 (2025)
- Area: 77 km^{2} (29.7 sq mi)
- Demographic: Outer metropolitan
- Coordinates: 32.409°S 115.774°E
Electorates around Secret Harbour:
None	Baldivis	Darling Range
None	Secret Harbour	Darling Range
None	Mandurah	Murray-Wellington

Secret Harbour is an electoral district represented in the Legislative Assembly of the state of Western Australia.

Secret Harbour is located in outer-metropolitan Perth, covering the vast majority of the former seat of Warnbro, which was renamed to Secret Harbour at the 2023 redistribution. Differing from its predecessor, Secret Harbour crosses the boundary of metropolitan Perth by taking in parts of Mandurah.

Secret Harbour was first contested at the 2025 state election with a notional margin for the Labor Party of 31.3%. Paul Papalia, the MP for the outgoing electorate of Warnbro was elected as Secret Harbour's inaugural member following the election.

On 6 July 2026, Papalia announced his resignation, citing a family member's medical issues, triggering a by-election, which was held on 29 August 2026. The by-election was won by Luke Herdegen of One Nation, who became their first member in the Western Australian Legislative Assembly.

== Members for Secret Harbour ==
Member	Party	Term
Paul Papalia	Labor	2025–2026
Luke Herdegen	One Nation	2026–present

== Election results ==
=== 2026 by-election ===
2026 Secret Harbour by-election
Party	Candidate	Votes	%	±%
One Nation	Luke Herdegen	10,862	39.12	+30.68
Labor	Georgia Tree	6,698	24.12	−22.43
Liberal	Ryan Robertson	4,777	17.20	−7.79
Greens	Rhi Davies	2,154	7.76	−1.06
Legalise Cannabis	Craig Buchanan	1,037	3.73	−2.13
Animal Justice	Neil Jensen	506	1.82	−0.79
Christians	Robert Burdett	469	1.69	−1.04
Independent	Jayne Palmer	278	1.00	+1.00
Libertarian	Matthew Barton	229	0.82	+0.82
Western Australia	Anthony Fels	182	0.66	+0.66
Shooters, Fishers, Farmers	Tim Hamilton	136	0.49	+0.49
Independent	Paul Howard	116	0.42	+0.42
Independent	Brett Murrell	106	0.38	+0.38
Independent	Teresa van Lieshout	102	0.37	+0.37
Independent	Paul Gullan	60	0.22	+0.22
Independent	Peter Dunne	57	0.21	+0.21
Total formal votes		27,769	96.58	+1.15
Informal votes		983	3.42	−1.15
Turnout		28,752	78.97	−5.57
Two-party-preferred result
One Nation	Luke Herdegen	15,851	57.19	+57.19
Labor	Georgia Tree	11,864	42.81	−18.73
One Nation gain from Labor				

=== 2025 ===
2025 Western Australian state election: Secret Harbour
Party	Candidate	Votes	%	±%
Labor	Paul Papalia	12,876	46.5	−28.5
Liberal	Mark Jones	6,913	25.0	+9.7
Greens	Tamsyn Heynes	2,439	8.8	+5.3
One Nation	Liam Hall	2,332	8.4	+6.3
Legalise Cannabis	Jim Matters	1,623	5.9	+5.5
Christians	Robert Burdett	755	2.7	+2.7
Animal Justice	Elizabeth Storer	723	2.6	+2.6
Total formal votes		27,661	95.4	−0.6
Informal votes		1,323	4.6	+0.6
Turnout		28,984	84.5	+4.0
Two-party-preferred result
Labor	Paul Papalia	17,011	61.5	−19.8
Liberal	Mark Jones	10,630	38.5	+19.8
Labor hold		Swing	−19.8	
