= 2026 Secret Harbour state by-election =

Election in Western Australia

- 29 August 2026

Electoral district of Secret Harbour in the Western Australian Legislative Assembly

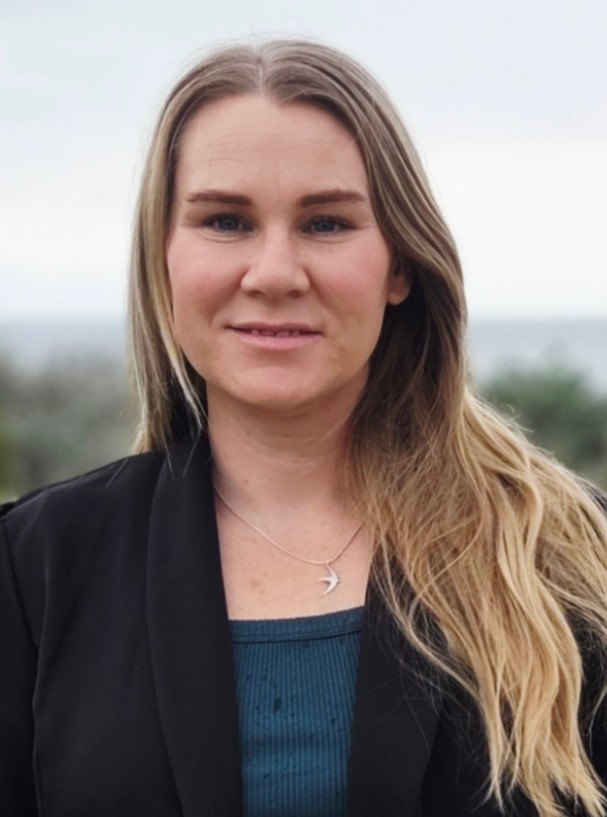
	First party	Second party
Candidate	Luke Herdegen	Georgia Tree
Party	One Nation	Labor
Popular vote	10,862	6,698
Percentage	39.12%	24.12%
Swing	▲30.69 pp	▼22.43 pp
TCP	15,851	11,864
TCP %	57.19%	42.81%
TCP swing	▲57.19 pp	▼18.73 pp
	Third party	Fourth party
Candidate	Ryan Robertson	Rhi Davies
Party	Liberal	Greens
Popular vote	4,777	2,154
Percentage	17.20%	7.76%
Swing	▼7.79 pp	▼1.06 pp
Member before election
Paul Papalia
Labor
Elected Member
Luke Herdegen
One Nation

A by-election was held on 29 August 2026 to elect the member of the Western Australian Legislative Assembly for the electorate of Secret Harbour, following the resignation of minister Paul Papalia because of family issues.

The by-election was called for One Nation by the ABC at 10:30 p.m. local time (4 1/2 hours after polls closed), with Luke Herdegen claiming victory for the party. He became the first One Nation candidate elected to the Western Australian Legislative Assembly.

== Background ==
Commentators framed the by-election as a test of One Nation's rising support in national opinion polls.

=== Electorate profile ===
Secret Harbour is located in the southern suburbs of Perth and is a replacement for the former seat of Warnbro. Differing from its predecessor, Secret Harbour crosses the boundary of metropolitan Perth by taking in parts of Mandurah. The electorate takes in the suburbs of Golden Bay, Karnup, Lakelands, Madora Bay, Port Kennedy, Secret Harbour, Singleton and Warnbro, and takes in part of the local government area of the City of Rockingham.

Secret Harbour was first contested at the 2025 state election with a notional margin for the Labor Party of 31.3%. Papalia, the MP for the outgoing electorate of Warnbro was elected as Secret Harbour's inaugural member following the election, with an 11.5% two-party-preferred margin.

=== Former member ===
On 6 July 2026, Papalia announced his resignation from his ministerial portfolios and as an MP, thereby triggering the by-election. Papalia was first elected as the member for Peel in the 2007 by-election, held the seat when it was changed to Warnbro and finally Secret Harbour.

Landsdale MP Daniel Pastorelli was awarded a spot in Cabinet, in place of Papalia.

=== Electoral system ===
As with all elections in Western Australia, full preferential voting will be used where casting a ballot is compulsory. In the full preferential system used, a candidate must receive an absolute majority, over 50% of the votes. A voter needs to mark all of the boxes listed on their ballot paper.

=== Key dates ===
On 14 July, the writ was issued by Stephen Price as Speaker of the Western Australian Legislative Assembly. Dates relevant to the by-election are listed below.

- Postal vote applications opened on 7 July at 6 pm
- Nomination of candidates closed at midday on 21 July
- Close of electoral rolls at 6 pm on 21 July
- Postal votes began being sent to voters on 28 July
- Mobile polling began on 16 August
- Early voting began on 17 August at 8 am
- Postal vote applications closed on 26 August at 6 pm
- Polling day was on 29 August from 8 am until 6 pm
- The last day for receipt of postal votes was 3 September at 9 am
- The results were declared on 9 September.
- Last day for return of the writ is 10 October

=== Previous result ===
2025 Western Australian state election: Secret Harbour
Party	Candidate	Votes	%	±%
Labor	Paul Papalia	12,876	46.5	−28.5
Liberal	Mark Jones	6,913	25.0	+9.7
Greens	Tamsyn Heynes	2,439	8.8	+5.3
One Nation	Liam Hall	2,332	8.4	+6.3
Legalise Cannabis	Jim Matters	1,623	5.9	+5.5
Christians	Robert Burdett	755	2.7	+2.7
Animal Justice	Elizabeth Storer	723	2.6	+2.6
Total formal votes		27,661	95.4	−0.6
Informal votes		1,323	4.6	+0.6
Turnout		28,984	84.5	+4.0
Two-party-preferred result
Labor	Paul Papalia	17,011	61.5	−19.8
Liberal	Mark Jones	10,630	38.5	+19.8
Labor hold		Swing	−19.8	

== Candidates ==
Candidates are listed in ballot order.

Party	Candidate	Background
Liberal	Ryan Robertson	Councillor for the City of Rockingham and real estate agent
Libertarian	Matthew Barton	Navy veteran
Greens	Rhi Davies	
Legalise Cannabis	Craig Robert Buchanan	Political staffer
Shooters, Fishers and Farmers	Tim Hamilton	
Labor	Georgia Tree	Political staffer
Independent	Paul Howard	Leader of the unregistered Australian Patriots Party
Christians	Robert Burdett	2025 candidate
Animal Justice	Neil Jensen	
Independent	Teresa van Lieshout	Perennial candidate
Independent	Paul Gullan	Disendorsed Legalise Cannibis candidate for Collie Preston at the 2025 WA state election
WA First	Anthony Fels	Former MLC, perennial candidate
Independent	Jayne Palmer	Former Finance Manager CPA, Current Mathematics High School Teacher
One Nation	Luke Herdegen	Anytime Fitness franchisee
Independent	Peter D. Dunne	Perennial candidate
Independent	Brett Murrell	Newcastle-based mechanical engineer and member of the unregistered Sovereign Australia Party

=== Labor ===
On 9 July 2026, the Western Australian Labor Party announced that Georgia Tree, a former advisor for federal resources minister Madeleine King, will be their candidate. Tree has also worked with gas company Woodside. Premier Roger Cook said that the by-election will be "tough for Labor".

=== Liberal ===
Western Australian Liberal Party leader Basil Zempilas formally decided to field a candidate on 9 July. Their candidate is Ryan Robertson, a councillor for the City of Rockingham.

=== Greens ===
The Western Australian Greens expressed an interest in fielding a candidate for the by-election, with their leader Brad Pettitt criticising Papalia's management of the prison system and said that the state needed a minister focused on "reinvestment, rehabilitation and diversion" rather than "increasing police powers". The Greens ultimately preselected Rhi Davies for the by-election.

=== One Nation ===
Western Australian One Nation announced their candidate would be Luke Herdegen, a gym owner. WA One Nation leader Rod Caddies said that One Nation are the "favourites" to gain the seats of Kwinana and Secret Harbour.

=== Nationals ===
The Western Australian National Party have indicated an intention to field more candidates in metropolitan seats but leader Shane Love stressed that "The decision on which seats the Nationals WA contest is ultimately one for our state council". They decided not to field a candidate, and instead to endorse the WA Liberals.

== How-to-vote cards ==
Western Australia uses a preferential voting system for Legislative Assembly elections, where voters must rank every candidate on the ballot in the order of their preference. How-to-vote cards are small leaflets distributed by party supporters suggesting the order voters should preference candidates. In Western Australian elections, how-to-vote cards must be registered with and approved by the WAEC prior to their distribution.

Independent candidates Teresa van Lieshout, Paul Gullan, and Brett Murrell, as well as WA First candidate Anthony Fels, did not register a how-to-vote card.

Legalise Cannabis candidate Craig Robert Buchanan, as well as independent candidate Jayne Palmer, ran an open ticket, with no further directions for preferences beyond "1" for themselves.

Conservative lobby group Turning Point Australia also registered a how-to-vote card, recommending voters preference One Nation "1", but with different preferences to the party itself.

Candidate	How-to-vote cards (read column top down)																
Candidate	LIB	LBT	GRN	LCA	SFF	ALP	How.	ACP	AJP	Lie.	Gul.	WAP	Pal.	ONP	Dun.	Mur.	TPA
Ryan Robertson (LIB)	1	9	7	—N/a	11	10	8	3	12	—N/a	—N/a	—N/a	—N/a	5	16	—N/a	7
Matthew Barton (LBT)	4	1	10	—N/a	2	11	4	5	14	—N/a	—N/a	—N/a	—N/a	4	7	—N/a	3
Rhi Davies (GRN)	13	12	1	—N/a	14	2	16	15	3	—N/a	—N/a	—N/a	—N/a	16	15	—N/a	14
Craig Robert Buchanan (LCA)	9	8	6	1	10	4	9	12	2	—N/a	—N/a	—N/a	—N/a	8	2	—N/a	11
Tim Hamilton (SFF)	5	2	12	—N/a	1	12	6	4	16	—N/a	—N/a	—N/a	—N/a	3	11	—N/a	4
Georgia Tree (ALP)	10	16	4	—N/a	16	1	15	14	10	—N/a	—N/a	—N/a	—N/a	15	4	—N/a	12
Paul Howard (IND)	7	10	14	—N/a	9	14	1	8	7	—N/a	—N/a	—N/a	—N/a	6	13	—N/a	6
Robert Burdett (ACP)	2	4	13	—N/a	4	13	3	1	14	—N/a	—N/a	—N/a	—N/a	2	10	—N/a	2
Neil Jensen (AJP)	12	13	2	—N/a	15	3	14	13	1	—N/a	—N/a	—N/a	—N/a	14	3	—N/a	13
Teresa van Lieshout (IND)	15	14	15	—N/a	7	15	13	10	11	—N/a	—N/a	—N/a	—N/a	9	5	—N/a	16
Paul Gullan (IND)	14	6	11	—N/a	6	9	12	11	4	—N/a	—N/a	—N/a	—N/a	10	12	—N/a	10
Anthony Fels (WAP)	6	7	9	—N/a	5	5	7	6	8	—N/a	—N/a	—N/a	—N/a	7	8	—N/a	5
Jayne Palmer (IND)	8	11	3	—N/a	12	8	11	7	9	—N/a	—N/a	—N/a	1	11	9	—N/a	9
Luke Herdegen (ONP)	3	3	16	—N/a	3	16	2	2	15	—N/a	—N/a	—N/a	—N/a	1	14	—N/a	1
Peter D. Dunne (IND)	16	15	5	—N/a	13	6	10	16	5	—N/a	—N/a	—N/a	—N/a	12	1	—N/a	15
Brett Murrell (IND)	11	5	8	—N/a	8	7	5	9	6	—N/a	—N/a	—N/a	—N/a	13	6	—N/a	8

== Results ==
2026 Secret Harbour by-election
Party	Candidate	Votes	%	±%
One Nation	Luke Herdegen	10,862	39.12	+30.68
Labor	Georgia Tree	6,698	24.12	−22.43
Liberal	Ryan Robertson	4,777	17.20	−7.79
Greens	Rhi Davies	2,154	7.76	−1.06
Legalise Cannabis	Craig Buchanan	1,037	3.73	−2.13
Animal Justice	Neil Jensen	506	1.82	−0.79
Christians	Robert Burdett	469	1.69	−1.04
Independent	Jayne Palmer	278	1.00	+1.00
Libertarian	Matthew Barton	229	0.82	+0.82
Western Australia	Anthony Fels	182	0.66	+0.66
Shooters, Fishers, Farmers	Tim Hamilton	136	0.49	+0.49
Independent	Paul Howard	116	0.42	+0.42
Independent	Brett Murrell	106	0.38	+0.38
Independent	Teresa van Lieshout	102	0.37	+0.37
Independent	Paul Gullan	60	0.22	+0.22
Independent	Peter Dunne	57	0.21	+0.21
Total formal votes		27,769	96.58	+1.15
Informal votes		983	3.42	−1.15
Turnout		28,752	78.97	−5.57
Two-party-preferred result
One Nation	Luke Herdegen	15,851	57.19	+57.19
Labor	Georgia Tree	11,864	42.81	−18.73
One Nation gain from Labor				
