= Electoral district of Mid-West =

Electoral district of the Western Australian Legislative Assembly

Mid-West Western Australia—Legislative Assembly
- Interactive map of district boundaries from the 2025 state election
- State: Western Australia
- Created: 2025
- MP: Shane Love
- Party: National
- Namesake: Mid West
- Electors: 24,392 (2025)
- Area: 423,508 km^{2} (163,517.4 sq mi)
- Demographic: Rural
- Coordinates: 26.73°S 116.45°E
Electorates around Mid-West:
| Indian Ocean | Pilbara | Kimberley |
| Geraldton; Indian Ocean | Mid-West | Kalgoorlie |
| Butler; Wanneroo; Swan Hills | Central Wheatbelt | Kalgoorlie |

Mid-West is an electoral district of the Western Australian Legislative Assembly. The seat was created at the 2023 redistribution as the successor to the large but lowly populated rural electorates of Moore and North West Central.

The seat was first contested at the 2025 state election. It was notionally held by the National Party on an 8.6% margin, and retained for the party by Shane Love.

== Geography ==
Mid-West is a coastal district, covering an expanse of rural territory to the north of Perth and surrounding but not including the regional city of Geraldton. While much of the district coincides with the Mid West Region, a large proportion of the electors are found in the adjacent parts of the Gascoyne and Wheatbelt regions.

The district includes the towns of Carnarvon, Meekatharra, Denham, Cue, Mount Magnet, Sandstone, Yalgoo, Dongara, Mingenew, Morawa, Three Springs, Perenjori, Carnamah, Eneabba, Leeman, Coorow, Jurien Bay, Cervantes, Badgingarra, Dandaragan, Moora, Dalwallinu, Lancelin, Ledge Point, Guilderton, Gingin, Bindoon and Muchea.

== Members for Mid-West ==
| Image | Member | Party | Term | Notes |
|---|---|---|---|---|
| | Shane Love (1961–) | National | 8 March 2025 – present | Transferred from the district of Moore. Incumbent |

== Election results ==
2025 Western Australian state election: Mid-West
| Party | Candidate | Votes | % | ±% |
|---|---|---|---|---|
| National | Shane Love | 8,464 | 42.9 | +4.2 |
| Liberal | Merome Beard | 4,563 | 23.1 | +6.6 |
| Labor | Jenna Denton | 3,362 | 17.1 | −16.7 |
| One Nation | Mark Douglas Burns | 1,218 | 6.2 | +3.6 |
| Greens | Chilla Bulbeck | 845 | 4.3 | +1.6 |
| Legalise Cannabis | Shannon Yeh | 650 | 3.3 | +3.3 |
| Christians | Mike Reymond | 401 | 2.0 | +2.0 |
| Libertarian | Chrystal Sclater | 214 | 1.1 | +1.1 |
| Total formal votes | | 19,717 | 95.8 | −0.3 |
| Informal votes | | 864 | 4.2 | +0.3 |
| Turnout | | 20,581 | 84.4 | +1.6 |
Two-candidate-preferred result
| National | Shane Love | 12,551 | 63.7 | +5.1 |
| Liberal | Merome Beard | 7,140 | 36.3 | +36.3 |
| National hold | | | | |
