= Rod Sweetman =

Australian politician

Rodney Noel Sweetman (born 21 June 1953) is a former Australian politician. He was a Liberal member of the Western Australian Legislative Assembly from 1996 to 2005.

Sweetman was born in the Perth suburb of Subiaco. He was first elected to state parliament at the 1996 state election winning the seat of Ningaloo and was subsequently re-elected to the same seat at the 2001 state election.

Ningaloo was abolished ahead of the 2005 state election with its territory split between Murchison-Eyre and the new seat of North West Coastal. Sweetman chose to contest neither seat, instead unsuccessfully seeking Liberal preselection in more winnable districts elsewhere. He then sought endorsement from the Family First Party but was rejected due to his vote in support of decriminalising abortion.

Sweetman has since returned to the Liberal Party, standing unsuccessfully as its candidate for the seat of North West at the 2008 state election.
