= Teresa van Lieshout =

Australian conspiracy theorist

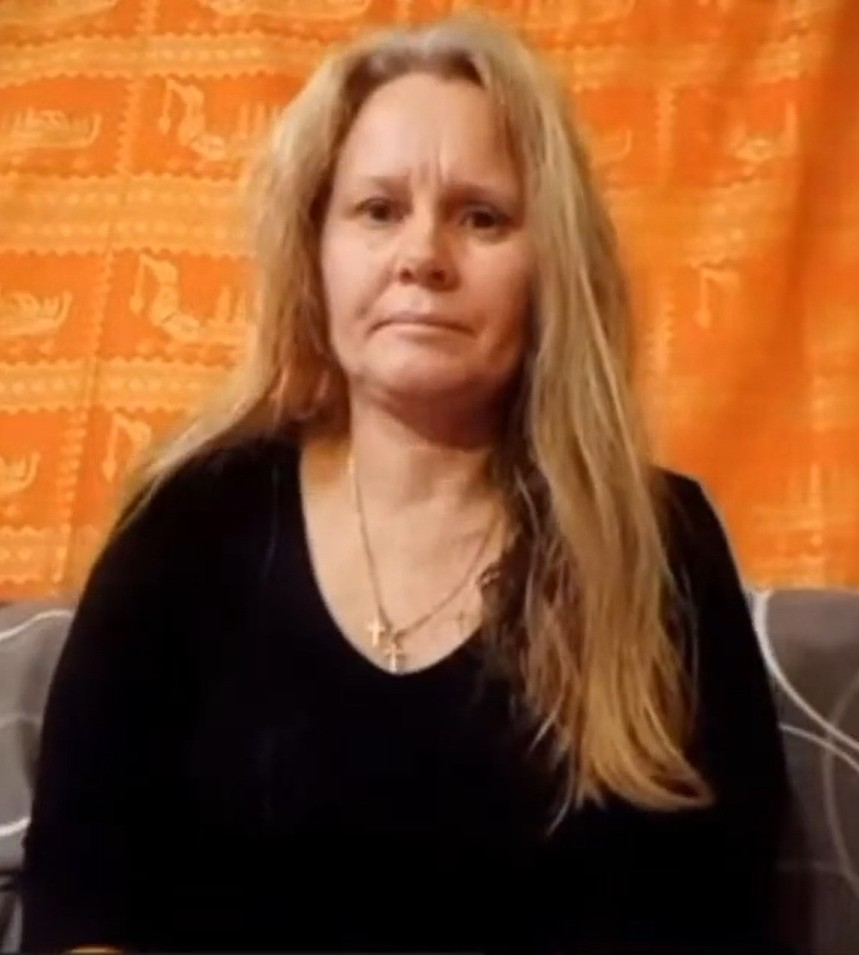
- Van Lieshout in 2023
- Born: 1974 or 1975 (age 50–51); Mundijong, Western Australia, Australia
- Education: University of Notre Dame Australia
- Political party: Independent
- Other political affiliations: One Nation (2005); West Australian (2011); Palmer United (2013) Protectionist (2013); Voter Rights (2018)

Teresa Angela van Lieshout (born 1971/1972) is an Australian far-right conspiracy theorist and perennial candidate.

In 2021, Van Lieshout was arrested for taking part in a plot to overthrow the government after importing hundreds of fake police badges and attempting to form a rival police force. In 2023 she was convicted of impersonating a Commonwealth public official and received a sentence covering time that she had already served in prison and a fine.

Van Lieshout holds a Master of Education from the University of Notre Dame Australia; however, she was deregistered as a teacher in 2015. She has written four non-fiction books. Van Lieshout has publicly supported a range of far-right positions, including opposition to immigration, COVID-19 lockdowns, and same-sex marriage.

== Early life and education ==
Teresa Angela van Lieshout was born between 1971 and 1972. She was born and raised in Mundijong, Western Australia, to Dutch migrant parents. She completed a Master of Education at the University of Notre Dame Australia.

== Political career ==
Van Lieshout contested Swan as an independent in the 2004 Australian federal election, receiving 1.4%. She was a candidate for Pauline Hanson's One Nation in the 2005 Western Australian state election. Contesting the multi-member South Metropolitan Region, she and her fellow candidate Neil Gilmour received 1.2% of the vote.

Van Lieshout contested the 2006 Victoria Park state by-election as an independent, finishing last with 0.27% of the vote. In March 2013, Van Lieshout ran as an independent in the Western Australia state election for the district of Willagee. She received 1.8% of the vote. On 20 June 2013, Van Lieshout was endorsed by Clive Palmer's United Australia Party to contest Fremantle in the federal election, having turned down offers by the Australian Democrats and Katter's Australian Party. The party rescinded its endorsement two weeks later. Van Lieshout initially claimed that party executives had acted without Palmer's knowledge and refused to accept the decision. Palmer later described her as an opportunist. In response, Van Lieshout accused Palmer of promoting human trafficking with his policies on asylum seekers. She subsequently contested the seat for the white nationalist Australian Protectionist Party, receiving 0.24% of the vote.

In April 2014, she contested the 2014 Australian Senate special election in Western Australia. Later in October, she ran in the 2014 Vasse state by-election, attracting attention by posing in a bikini in a campaign advertisement. She placed last with 1.4% of the vote. In 2015, she contested the 2015 Canning by-election. She launched her campaign with a dance video. She received 0.64% of the vote. In the 2016 Australian federal election, she ran for the senate in New South Wales alongside Colin Bennett. Together they received 0.09%.

She contested the 2018 Batman by-election as an independent, receiving 1.5% of the vote. After she did not receive an invitation to a candidates' forum discussing climate change, Van Lieshout protested outside the event with her mouth taped shut. In 2019, she contested Cooper in the 2019 Australian federal election. During the campaign, she was captured on video berating two Nigerian men in the street, telling them to get out of her country and claiming that foreigners are being brought to Australia to murder Australian-born citizens. Despite the video, she denied being racist and claimed that the men had verbally abused her beforehand. She placed last and received 1.7% of the vote.

Van Lieshout has attempted to launch two political parties of her own, the West Australian Party (not to be confused with the earlier Western Australian Party or the later Western Australia Party), and the Voter Rights Party. Van Lieshout's attempt to register the Voter Rights Party was rejected by the Electoral Commission in 2018.

Van Lieshout was confirmed as an independent candidate for the 2026 Secret Harbour state by-election.

== Legal issues ==
=== 2013–2015 ===
In 2013, Van Lieshout was convicted for breaching planning laws after putting up political signage outside her home during an election. She had two appeals rejected by the Supreme Court of Western Australia.

On 8 September 2015, a warrant was issued for her arrest after she failed to show up at court on charges of breaching bail, stealing, and wilful unlawful damage in relation to the destruction of a wheel clamp placed on her car. She referred to the trial as "a Nazi fascist process" and called for the judge to be arrested. After this was reported in the Mandurah Mail, Van Lieshout responded with abusive Facebook posts and voicemails. Her attacks were condemned by the local Media, Entertainment & Arts Alliance chapter. By 9 November, she had been arrested.

=== 2021 coup plot ===
Van Lieshout was arrested after importing 470 fake police badges. She was part of a group called "Equity of the People's Nation", which aims to form an alternative police force to arrest politicians and other public servants. The group came to police attention after a video went viral showing a man claiming to be a police officer holding a recruitment meeting for this alternative police force. In the video, he refers to Van Lieshout as "the true governor-general". After a 9 July Zoom call with one thousand members of the group during which Van Lieshout threatened violence against Australian political leaders, the group distanced itself from her and subsequently splintered.

In January 2022, she was refused bail. Her proposed guarantor had previously been fined for breaching COVID-19 rules, which judge Brett Dixon said made him unsuitable. She was remanded in custody until March. On 11 March, Van Lieshout was granted electronically monitored home detention bail under the condition that she take medication for her mental health and does not use the internet to post videos or speak to her followers. While Van Lieshout denies being mentally ill, her lawyers attempted to argue a mental incompetence defence. Prosecutors rejected this defence and laid an additional charge against her in April. In September, it was reported that two psychiatrists had declared her competent to stand trial, but incompetent to have committed a crime due to a delusional disorder.

In May 2023, Van Lieshout fired her lawyer and was subject to further bail restrictions after continued Twitter usage and taking part in a YouTube interview wherein she justified her actions. In September 2023, Van Lieshout pleaded guilty to falsely representing herself to be a Commonwealth public official and importing false Australian Federal Police badges. In October 2023, Van Lieshout was sentenced to time already served and a $200 fine.

== Political positions ==
Van Lieshout has campaigned on a platform of banning psychiatry. She has said this stems from her brother being involuntarily institutionalised after he was diagnosed with schizophrenia. She claims he was nearly killed after being pumped full of drugs. She supports the policy of sending asylum seekers to the immigration detention facilities of Christmas Island, Manus Island, and Nauru. She wants all Islamic schools to be closed.

Van Lieshout is against same-sex marriage, preferring civil unions instead. During the COVID-19 pandemic, Van Lieshout has given speeches at anti-lockdown protests. She has also sold fake "mask exemption badges". Van Lieshout has been described as being far-right.

In 2014, after police dropped the investigation into historical rape claims against Australian Labor Party leader Bill Shorten, Van Lieshout published a video expressing support for the accuser and claiming that "the male gender is not morally fit to be politicians or police officers". In 2016, Van Lieshout organised a petition to stop the Commonwealth Bank of Australia from closing its branch in the suburb of Brighton-Le-Sands.

== Personal life ==
Van Lieshout is a deregistered teacher. Her registration as a teacher was cancelled in April 2015. She claimed this was done by the government to destroy her political career. Van Lieshout has published four non-fiction books.
