= Mia Davies =

Australian politician (born 1978)

36th Leader of the Opposition in Western Australia Elections: 2021
- In office 14 April 2021 – 30 January 2023
- Premier: Mark McGowan
- Preceded by: Zak Kirkup
- Succeeded by: Shane Love

15th Leader of the National Party in Western Australia
- In office 21 March 2017 – 30 January 2023
- Deputy: Jacqui Boydell; Shane Love
- Preceded by: Brendon Grylls
- Succeeded by: Shane Love

Member of the Legislative Assembly for Central Wheatbelt
- In office 21 March 2013 – 5 February 2025
- Preceded by: Brendon Grylls
- Succeeded by: Lachlan Hunter

Member of the Legislative Council for Agricultural Region
- In office 22 May 2009 – 12 February 2013 Serving with Benson-Lidholm, Chown, Ellis, Gardiner, Trenorden
- Preceded by: Brendon Grylls
- Succeeded by: Jacqui Boydell
Party leadership positions
Deputy Leader of the National Party in Western Australia
In office 26 November 2013 – 11 March 2017
| Leader | Terry Redman; Brendon Grylls |
| Preceded by | Terry Redman |
| Succeeded by | Jacqui Boydell |
Parliamentary Secretary for Regional Development and Lands
In office 22 June 2009 – 1 January 2012
| Leader | Brendon Grylls |
| Preceded by | Terry Redman |
| Succeeded by | Vince Catania |
Ministerial offices
Assistant Minister for State Development
In office 8 December 2014 – 27 March 2017
| Premier | Colin Barnett |
| Preceded by | Bill Marmion |
| Succeeded by | Alannah MacTiernan |
Minister for Sport and Recreation
In office 8 December 2014 – 27 March 2017
| Premier | Colin Barnett |
| Preceded by | Terry Waldron |
| Succeeded by | Mick Murray |
Minister for Water and Forestry
In office 11 December 2013 – 17 March 2017
| Premier | Colin Barnett |
| Preceded by | Terry Redman |
| Succeeded by | Dave Kelly |

Personal details
- Born: Mia Jane Davies; 3 November 1978 (age 47) Perth, Western Australia, Australia
- Party: National
- Parent: Dexter Davies (father)
- Education: Wyalkatchem District High School; Methodist Ladies' College
- Alma mater: Murdoch University
- Website: www.miadavies.com.au

Mia Jane Davies (born 3 November 1978) is an Australian politician who was the Leader of the Opposition and leader of the National Party in Western Australia from March 2021 to January 2023. She was a member of the state Legislative Assembly from 2013 to 2025, having previously served in the Legislative Council from 2009 to 2013. Davies was elected deputy leader of the Nationals in November 2013, and replaced Brendon Grylls as leader in March 2017 following his defeat at the 2017 state election. As a result of the Liberal Party's electoral wipeout at the 2021 state election, she became leader of the opposition after Premier Mark McGowan gave her party the official opposition party funding, the first member of her party to hold the role since Arthur Watts in 1947. She resigned as leader of the opposition and leader of her party in January 2023, and said she would not recontest her seat at the 2025 election.

== Early life ==
Davies was born in Perth to Leonie (née South) and Dexter Davies. Her father was also a National Party member of parliament. Davies was raised on her parents' farm in Yorkrakine, a small Wheatbelt town. She attended Wyalkatchem District High School before boarding at Methodist Ladies' College, Perth, and later completed a degree in marketing and media at Murdoch University. From 1999 to 2001, Davies lived and worked in London. After returning to Australia, she began working for Max Trenorden (the state leader of the National Party at the time) as an administrative assistant and research officer. She continued on in a similar role when Brendon Grylls became leader in 2005, and later ran her own consulting business.

== Politics ==
At the 2008 state election, Davies was elected to parliament in third position on the National Party ticket for Agricultural Region. Her election was challenged by Anthony Fels, a Family First candidate, and the dispute was not settled until just two days before her term was set to begin (in May 2009). She was 30 years old at the time of being sworn in, becoming the youngest member of the Legislative Council at the time (the "baby of the house"). At the 2013 state election, Davies transferred to the Legislative Assembly, winning the seat of Central Wheatbelt. Her predecessor in the seat was Brendon Grylls, the party leader, who had transferred to the seat of Pilbara. After the election, Davies was made parliamentary secretary to the Minister for Regional Development and the Minister for Lands, and also assistant minister to the Minister for State Development.

In November 2013, Davies was elected deputy leader of the National Party, replacing Terry Redman (who had replaced Brendon Grylls as leader). Her only opponent for the deputy leadership was Wendy Duncan. Davies was subsequently elevated to the ministry, becoming Minister for Water and Minister for Forestry. She was 35 at the time, becoming the youngest ever government minister from her party (and the eighth youngest overall). In December 2014, Davies was also made Minister for Sport and Recreation, replacing Terry Waldron. She continued in cabinet until the Barnett government's landslide defeat at the 2017 state election, which also saw Brendon Grylls lose the seat of Pilbara. Despite this, Davies actually increased her share of the vote, with Central Wheatbelt becoming the safest non-government seat in the state. Following the state election in March 2017; Davies was elected the Leader of the Parliamentary National Party (WA) and Mining and Pastoral MP, Hon Jacqui Boydell MLC became the Deputy Leader.

In 2021 after the political wipeout of the WA Liberal Party, she became State Opposition Leader, the first time the Nationals had been the official opposition since 1947. She became the third woman to be WA Opposition Leader and each from a different party after former Labor Premier Carmen Lawrence and former Liberal leader Liza Harvey.

Although the Nationals were one seat short of official status in the legislature, Premier Mark McGowan promised that Davies and the Nationals would receive the resources entitled to them as an opposition. On 19 April 2021, the Nationals formed a formal opposition alliance with the remains of the Liberals, led by David Honey. The Nationals would be the senior partner, and Davies appointed Honey and two other Liberals to her shadow cabinet. Each party maintained their independence, and could speak out on their own when there were disagreements with the other partner.

In January 2023, she resigned as leader of the opposition and leader of the National Party and was succeeded by Shane Love.

She stood down at the 2025 Western Australian state election and was succeeded by fellow National Party candidate Lachlan Hunter.

She was a candidate for the Division of Bullwinkel in the 2025 Australian federal election.

== Political positions ==
Davies supports the Indigenous Voice to Parliament.

== See also ==
- Women in the Western Australian Legislative Assembly
- Women in the Western Australian Legislative Council

Western Australian Legislative Assembly
| Preceded by Brendon Grylls | Member for Central Wheatbelt; 2013–2025 | Succeeded by Lachlan Hunter |
Political offices
| Preceded by Terry Redman | Minister for Water; 2013–2017 | Succeeded by Dave Kelly |
| Preceded by Terry Redman | Minister for Forestry; 2013–2017 | Succeeded by Dave Kelly |
| Preceded by Terry Waldron | Minister for Sport and Recreation; 2014–2017 | Succeeded by Mick Murray |
| Preceded by Zak Kirkup | Leader of the Opposition in Western Australia; 2021–2023 | Succeeded by Shane Love |
Party political offices
| Preceded by Brendon Grylls | Leader of the National Party of Western Australia; 2017–2023 | Succeeded by Shane Love |
