= 2025 Western Australian Liberal Party leadership election =

Election of Basil Zempilas

- 25 March 2025
- Leadership election
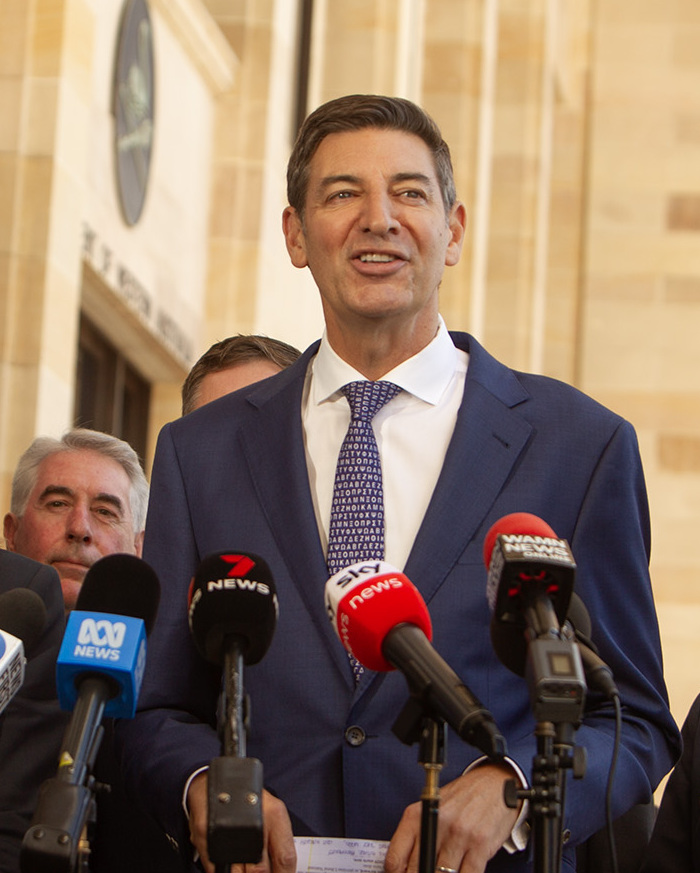
Candidate	Basil Zempilas
Caucus vote	Unopposed
Seat	Churchlands
Leader before election
Libby Mettam
Elected Leader
Basil Zempilas
- Deputy leadership election
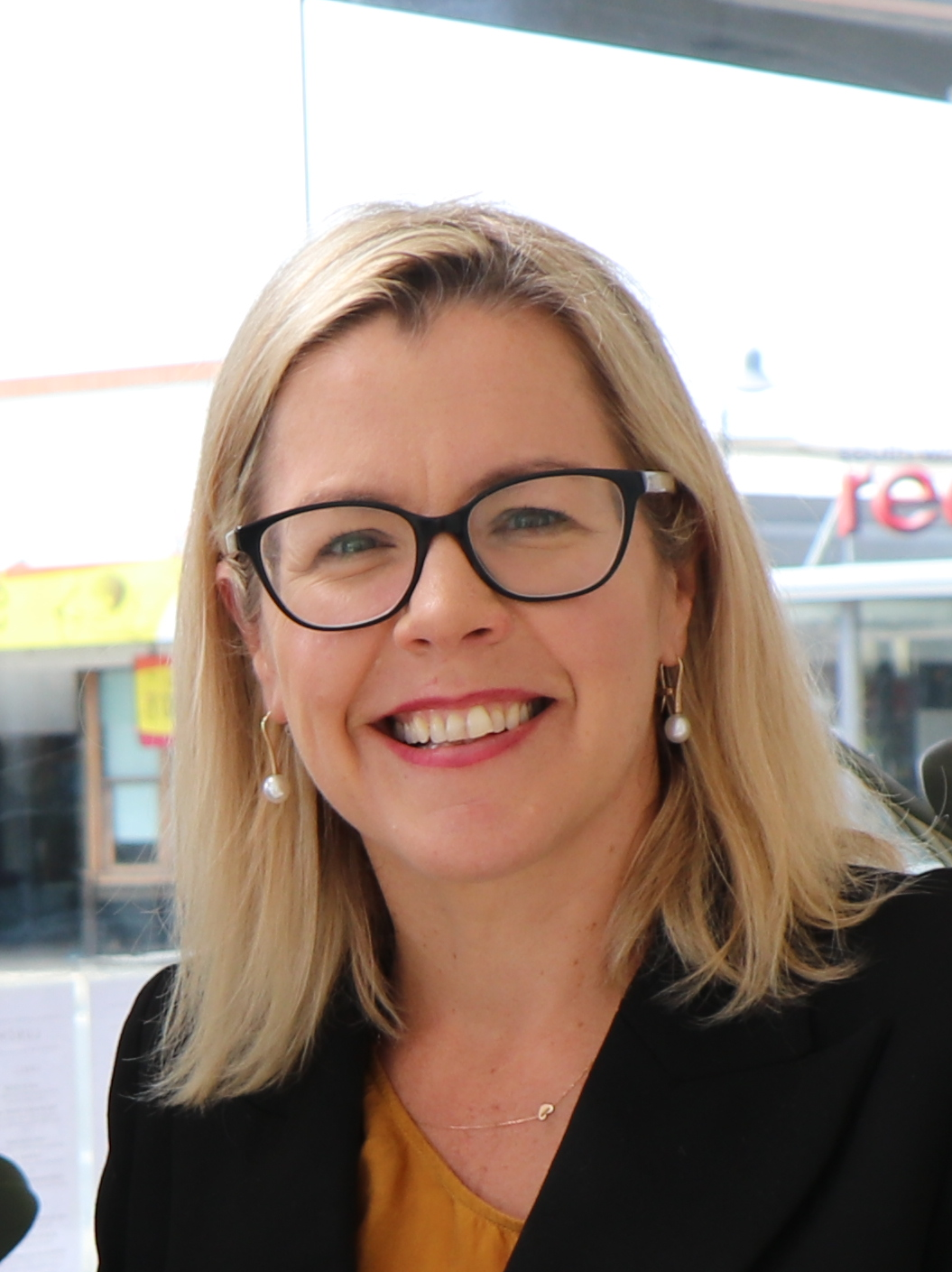
Candidate	Libby Mettam
Caucus vote	Unopposed
Seat	Vasse
Deputy Leader before election
Steve Martin
Elected Deputy Leader
Libby Mettam

The 2025 Western Australian Liberal Party leadership election was held on 25 March 2025 to elect the leader of the Western Australian Liberal Party, following the resignation of Libby Mettam.

After the Liberal Party's loss to Labor at the state election on 8 March 2025, Mettam announced that she would resign as leader, saying she said she did not have enough support from other Liberal MPs to remain in the position.

Basil Zempilas, who was elected as the member for Churchlands at the 2025 state election, announced on 20 March 2025 that he would contest the leadership. Mettam contested the position of deputy leader, which had been held by Steve Martin since February 2024. Both Zempilas and Mettam were elected unopposed to their respective positions.

== Candidates ==
=== Leader ===
==== Nominated ====
Candidate	Electorate	Announced
Basil Zempilas	Churchlands	20 March 2025

=== Deputy leader ===
==== Nominated ====
Candidate	Electorate	Announced
Libby Mettam	Vasse	20 March 2025
