= Electoral district of North West Central =

State electoral district of Western Australia

Coordinates: 25°S 122°E

North West Central Western Australia—Legislative Assembly
- Interactive map of district boundaries from the 2021 state election to 2025
- State: Western Australia
- Dates current: 2005–2025^{1}
- MP: Merome Beard
- Party: Liberal
- Namesake: North-west region of Western Australia
- Electors: 10,993 (2021)
- Area: 820,591 km^{2} (316,832.0 sq mi)
- Demographic: Rural, remote and provincial
Electorates around North West Central:
| Indian Ocean | Pilbara; Kimberley | Northern Territory |
| Indian Ocean | North West Central | Northern Territory |
| Indian Ocean | Kalgoorlie; Moore | South Australia |

Footnotes
- ^{1} known as North West Coastal 2005–2008 and North West 2008–2013

North West Central was an electoral district of the Legislative Assembly in the Australian state of Western Australia from 2005 to 2025.

The district was mostly based in the rural north-west of Western Australia.

== History ==
First known as North West Coastal, the district was first created for the 2005 state election, incorporating territory from the abolished districts of Burrup and Ningaloo. The seat was won by Labor MP, and then member for Burrup, Fred Riebeling.

The district was expanded for the 2008 state election, incorporating more inland territory which resulted in the name change to North West. With Riebeling's decision to retire, the contest pitted Labor MP Vince Catania, then a member of the Legislative Council, against Liberal candidate, and former Ningaloo MP, Rod Sweetman, with Catania emerging victorious. On 20 July 2009, Catania announced his decision to leave the Labor Party to join the rival National Party.

The 2013 state election saw the Labor-leaning Shire of Roebourne transferred to the Pilbara while taking more central areas of the state including the shires of Sandstone and Wiluna, increasing National's hold on the seat. The increase in terms of area in the central part of the state saw yet another name change to North West Central.

Catania resigned on 8 August 2022, resulting in the 2022 North West Central state by-election, which was retained for the Nationals by Merome Beard. On 31 October 2023, Beard announced her decision to leave the National Party to join the Liberal Party.

On 1 December 2023 the Western Australian Electoral Commission merged the seats of Moore and North West Central into the new seat of Mid-West.

== Geography ==
Based in the remote north-west of Western Australia, the district includes the towns of Carnarvon, Coral Bay, Cue, Denham, Exmouth, Meekatharra, Mount Magnet, Onslow, Paraburdoo, Sandstone, Tom Price, Warburton, Wiluna and Yalgoo.

== Members ==
North West Coastal (2005–2008)
| Member | Party | Term |
|---|---|---|
| Fred Riebeling | Labor | 2005–2008 |
North West (2008–2013)
| Member | Party | Term |
| Vince Catania | Labor | 2008–2009 |
| Vince Catania | National | 2009–2013 |
North West Central (2013–present)
| Member | Party | Term |
| Vince Catania | National | 2013–2022 |
| Merome Beard | National | 2022–2023 |
| Merome Beard | Liberal | 2023–2025 |

== Election results ==
2022 North West Central state by-election
| Party | Candidate | Votes | % | ±% |
|---|---|---|---|---|
| National | Merome Beard | 2,042 | 40.2 | +0.4 |
| Liberal | Will Baston | 1,353 | 26.6 | +18.7 |
| Greens | Niels Glahn-Bertelsen | 635 | 12.5 | +8.4 |
| Legalise Cannabis | Leanne Lockyer | 269 | 5.3 | +5.3 |
| Western Australia | Andrea Randle | 202 | 4.0 | +4.0 |
| One Nation | Gerald Laurent | 197 | 3.9 | +0.9 |
| Western Australia | Anthony Fels | 108 | 2.1 | +2.1 |
| No Mandatory Vaccination | Aaron Horsman | 82 | 1.6 | +0.6 |
| Independent | Peter Dunne | 55 | 1.1 | +1.1 |
| Small Business | Peter Baker | 55 | 1.1 | +1.1 |
| Independent | Tony Stokes | 44 | 0.9 | +0.9 |
| Liberal Democrats | Jake McCoull | 42 | 0.8 | +0.8 |
| Total formal votes | | 5,084 | 95.3 | −0.2 |
| Informal votes | | 251 | 4.7 | +0.2 |
| Turnout | | 5,335 | 47.7 | |
Two-candidate-preferred result
| National | Merome Beard | 3,071 | 60.5 | +8.8 |
| Liberal | Will Baston | 2,008 | 39.5 | +39.5 |
| National hold | | | | |

2021 Western Australian state election: North West Central
| Party | Candidate | Votes | % | ±% |
|---|---|---|---|---|
| Labor | Cherie Sibosado | 3,114 | 40.2 | +13.5 |
| National | Vince Catania | 3,075 | 39.7 | +3.6 |
| Liberal | Alys McKeough | 611 | 7.9 | −7.9 |
| Greens | Sandy Burt | 318 | 4.1 | −1.5 |
| Shooters, Fishers, Farmers | Stefan Colagiuri | 233 | 3.0 | +2.6 |
| One Nation | Robert Tonkin | 232 | 3.0 | −8.4 |
| No Mandatory Vaccination | A. Agyputri | 81 | 1.0 | +1.0 |
| Independent | Henry Seddon | 40 | 0.5 | +0.5 |
| WAxit | Brendan McKay | 37 | 0.5 | +0.2 |
| Total formal votes | | 7,741 | 95.5 | +0.1 |
| Informal votes | | 367 | 4.5 | −0.1 |
| Turnout | | 8,108 | 73.8 | −5.5 |
Two-candidate-preferred result
| National | Vince Catania | 3,997 | 51.7 | −8.4 |
| Labor | Cherie Sibosado | 3,738 | 48.3 | +8.4 |
| National hold | | Swing | −8.4 | |

== See also ==
- Division of Durack for the Australian House of Representatives, the largest Federal division by area
