= Lachlan Hunter (politician) =

Western Australian politician

Lachlan Hunter MLA

Member of the Western Australian Legislative Assembly for Central Wheatbelt
- Incumbent
- Assumed office 8 March 2025
- Preceded by: Mia Davies

Personal details
- Born: 26 July 1995 (age 31) Kalgoorlie
- Party: National
- Education: University of Western Australia
- Website: http://www.lachlanhunter.com.au/

Lachlan Hunter is an Australian politician from the National Party who is member of the Western Australian Legislative Assembly for the electoral district of Central Wheatbelt. He won his seat at the 2025 Western Australian state election. He succeeded former Leader of the Opposition Mia Davies. He serves as Shadow Minister for Racing and Gaming; Agriculture and Food; Mines, Petroleum and Exploration.

He has had a career in the agricultural industry and also worked at Australia Post. He was born in Kalgoorlie, but moved to the Bruce Rock in the Central Wheatbelt as a child.

Western Australian Legislative Assembly
Preceded by Mia Davies	Member for Central Wheatbelt; 2025–present	Incumbent
