= Chilla Bulbeck =

Australian academic (born 1951)

- Born: Margaret Chilla Bulbeck; 1951 (age 74–75)

Academic background
- Education: University of Queensland
- Thesis: The iron fist and the velvet glove: an investigation of the power of the new petit-bourgeoisie in capitalist formations (1979)

Margaret Chilla Bulbeck (born 1951) was the emeritus professor of women's studies at Adelaide University from 1997 until 2008, and has published widely on issues of gender and difference.

== Education ==
Bulbeck gained a degree in economics from the University of Adelaide (1972), a Master of Arts (1975) and a Ph.D. in sociology (1980) from the Australian National University, and an LL.B. from the University of Queensland (1991).

== Political career ==
After retiring from academic life, Bulbeck entered politics as a full-time volunteer for The Greens (WA), becoming their Secretary and co-editor of their newsletter. She also ran, unsuccessfully in the 2013 Western Australian state election for the district of Mandurah.

== Bibliography ==
=== Books ===
- Bulbeck, Chilla (1979). The iron fist and the velvet glove: an investigation of the power of the new petit-bourgeoisie in capitalist formations (Ph.D.). Australian National University. OCLC 846261268.
- Bulbeck, Chilla; Heath, Colleen (1985). Shadow of the hill. Fremantle: Fremantle Arts Centre Press. ISBN 9780909144975.
- Bulbeck, Chilla (1988). One world women's movement. London Winchester, Massachusetts: Pluto Press. ISBN 9781853050145.
- Bulbeck, Chilla (1993). Social sciences in Australia: an introduction. Sydney: Harcourt Brace Jovanovich. ISBN 9780729512602.
- Bulbeck, Chilla (2002) [1992]. Australian women in Papua New Guinea: colonial passages, 1920-1960. Cambridge: Cambridge University Press. ISBN 9780521523202.
- Bulbeck, Chilla (1997). Living feminism: the impact of the women's movement on three generations of Australian women. Cambridge New York: Cambridge University Press. ISBN 9780521465960.
- Bulbeck, Chilla (1998). Social sciences in Australia: an introduction (2nd ed.). Sydney: Harcourt Brace. ISBN 9780729532983.
- Bulbeck, Chilla (1998). Re-orienting western feminisms: women's diversity in a postcolonial world. Cambridge New York: Cambridge University Press. ISBN 9780521589758.

Featured in the International Feminist Journal of Politics "rethinking the canon" series: Sisson Runyan, Anne (January 1999). "Rethinking the canon: reflections on a text that ought to be essential reading". International Feminist Journal of Politics. 1 (3): 487–490. doi:10.1080/146167499359862.
Extracted in Rothenberg, Paula S. (2006). Beyond borders: thinking critically about global issues. New York: Worth Publishers. ISBN 9780716773894.

- Bulbeck, Chilla (2005). Facing the wild ecotourism, conservation and animal encounters. London Sterling Virginia: Earthscan. ISBN 9781844071388.
- Bulbeck, Chilla (2009). Sex, love and feminism in the Asia Pacific: a cross-cultural study of young people's attitudes. ASAA women in Asia. London New York: Routledge. ISBN 9780415470063.
- Bulbeck, Chilla (2012). Imagining the future: young Australians on sex, love and community. Adelaide, South Australia: University of Adelaide Press. ISBN 9781922064349.

=== Chapters in books ===
- Bulbeck, Chilla (1980), "Middle class workers: schisms in the new petty bourgeoisie", in Boreham, Paul; Dow, Geoff (eds.), Workers, economic crisis, and the state (volume 1), South Melbourne: Macmillan, pp. 127–142, ISBN 9780333299463.
- Bulbeck, Chilla; Whitlock, Gillian (1988), "A small and often still voice: women intellectuals in Australia", in Head, Brian; Walter, James (eds.), Intellectual movements and Australian society, Melbourne Oxford: Oxford University Press, pp. 145–169, ISBN 9780195546071.
- Bulbeck, Chilla (1998), "Treating ourselves to a republic", in Gatens, Moira; Mackinnon, Alison (eds.), Gender and institutions: welfare, work, and citizenship, Cambridge New York: Cambridge University Press, pp. 167–184, ISBN 9780521635769.
- Bulbeck, Chilla (2003), "Western feminisms: through the eyes of the "other"", in Bird, Delys; Were, Wendy; White, Terri-Ann (eds.), Future imaginings: sexualities and genders in the new millennium, Crawley, Western Australia: University of Western Australia Press for the Westerly Centre, pp. 11–25, ISBN 9781920694074.
- Bulbeck, Chilla (2005), "Equality and difference feminism: a comparison of the attitudes of young Australians and Japanese", in Alomes, Stephen (ed.), Islands in the stream: Australia and Japan face globalisation, Hawthorn, Victoria: Maribyrnong Press, pp. 43–60, ISBN 9780975238417.
- Bulbeck, Chilla (2005), "Gender policies: hers to his", in Saunders, Peter; Walter, James (eds.), Ideas and influence: social science and public policy in Australia, Sydney: UNSW Press, pp. 141–158, ISBN 9780868409146.
- Bulbeck, Chilla (2007), "Hailing the "authentic other": constructing the Third World woman as aid recipient in donor NGO agendas", in Sarker, Sonita (ed.), Sustainable feminisms, Amsterdam Boston: JAI Press, pp. 59–73, ISBN 9780762314393.
- Bulbeck, Chilla (2007), "'Our' whiteness and 'their' difference? The boundaries around humanity drawn by young Aboriginal and non-Aboriginal Australians", in Petrilli, Susan (ed.), Il bianco in questione [White matters], Athanor: Semiotica, Filosofia, Arte, Letteratura (volume 10) (in Italian), Roma: Meltemi, pp. 326–331, ISBN 9788883535581.
- Bulbeck, Chilla (2009), ""Recognising" each other in conversations between Anglo feminists and Muslim women", in Dreher, Tanja; Ho, Christina (eds.), Beyond the hijab debates: new conversations on gender, race, and religion, Newcastle upon Tyne, UK: Cambridge Scholars Publishing, pp. 208–221, ISBN 9781443801690.
- Bulbeck, Chilla (2011), "Gender perspectives", in McAllister, Ian; Dorwick, Steve; Hassan, Riaz (eds.), The Cambridge handbook of social sciences in Australia, Cambridge, England: Cambridge University Press, pp. 480–498, ISBN 9781107403444.

=== Journal articles ===
- Bulbeck, Chilla (March 1981). "Some uses of historical analysis in the study of the state". Australian and New Zealand Journal of Sociology. 17 (1): 77–82. doi:10.1177/144078338101700110. S2CID 143573533.
- Bulbeck, Chilla (December 1983). "The iron ore stockpile and dispute activity in the Pilbara". Journal of Industrial Relations. 25 (4): 431–444. doi:10.1177/002218568302500403. S2CID 154222750.
- Bulbeck, Chilla (November 1986). "Manning the machines: women in the furniture industry 1920-1960". Labor History. 51 (1): 24–32. doi:10.2307/27508795. JSTOR 27508795.
- Bulbeck, Chilla (November 1987). "The hegemony of Queensland's difference". Journal of Australian Studies. 11 (21): 19–28. doi:10.1080/14443058709386955.
- Bulbeck, Chilla (1987). "Gender studies at Griffith University". Women's Studies International Forum. 10 (5): 537–541. doi:10.1016/0277-5395(87)90010-0.
- Bulbeck, Chilla (April 1991). "Aborigines, memorials and the history of the frontier". Australian Historical Studies. 25 (96): 168–178. doi:10.1080/10314619108595878.
- Bulbeck, Chilla (July 1991). "Hearing the difference: first and third world feminisms". Asian Studies Review. 15 (1): 77–91. doi:10.1080/03147539108712747.
- Bulbeck, Chilla (January 1996). "How the Beijing Platform for Action addresses women's commonality and diversity". Development Bulletin. 36: 12–15. Pdf.
- Bulbeck, Chilla (January 1996). "Less than overwhelmed by Beijing: problems concerning women's commonality and diversity". Australian Feminist Law Journal. 6 (1): 30–38. doi:10.1080/13200968.1996.11077189.
- Bulbeck, Chilla (1999). "Simone de Beauvoir and generations of feminists". Hecate. 25 (2): 1–18. Archived from the original on 29 February 2016.
- Bulbeck, Chilla (September 2000). "The 'space between' or why does the gap between 'us' and 'them' look like an unbridgeable chasm?". Asian Journal of Women's Studies. 6 (3): 36–64. doi:10.1080/12259276.2000.11665885. S2CID 145437386.
- Bulbeck, Chilla (March–April 2001). "Articulating structure and agency: How women's studies students express their relationships with feminism". Women's Studies International Forum. 24 (2): 141–156. doi:10.1016/S0277-5395(01)00161-3.
- Bulbeck, Chilla (2003). ""I wish to become the leader of women and give them equal rights in society": how young Australians and Asians understand feminism and the women's movement". Journal of Interdisciplinary Gender Studies. 7 (1–2): 4–25. hdl:1959.13/1046813.
- Bulbeck, Chilla (December 2004). "The 'white worrier' in South Australia: attitudes to multiculturalism, immigration and reconciliation". Journal of Sociology. 40 (4): 341–361. doi:10.1177/1440783304048379. S2CID 144261706.
- Bulbeck, Chilla (2005). "Stifling freedom of thought in the information age?". Dialogue. 24 (1): 38–48. Archived from the original on 29 February 2016. Pdf.
- Bulbeck, Chilla (January 2005). "'The mighty pillar of the family': Young people's vocabularies to household gender arrangements in the Asia-Pacific". Gender, Work and Organization. 12 (1): 14–31. doi:10.1111/j.1468-0432.2005.00260.x.
- Bulbeck, Chilla (March 2005). "Women are exploited way too often: feminist rhetorics at the end of equality". Australian Feminist Studies. 20 (46): 65–76. doi:10.1080/0816464042000334546. S2CID 144975938.
- Bulbeck, Chilla (2006). "Explaining the generation debate: envy, history or feminism's victories?". Lilith: A Feminist History Journal. 15: 35–47.
- Bulbeck, Chilla; Balme, Jane (December 2008). "Engendering origins: theories of gender in sociology and archaeology". Australian Archaeology, Special Festschrift Issue for Sandra Bowdler. 67: 3–11.

=== Papers ===
- Bulbeck, Chilla (1988). The stone laurel: of race, gender and class in Australian memorials. Nathan, Queensland: Institute for Cultural Policy Studies, Division of Humanities, Griffith University. ISBN 9780868573304. Occasional paper no. 5.
- Bulbeck, Chilla (1988). Staying in line or getting out of place: the experiences of expatriate women in Papua New Guinea, 1920-1960: issues of race and gender. London: Sir Robert Menzies Centre for Australian Studies, Institute of Commonwealth Studies, University of London. ISBN 9780902499898. Working paper no. 35.
- Bulbeck, Chilla; Bennett, Tony; Finnane, Mark (1991). Accessing the past. Nathan, Queensland: Institute for Cultural Policy Studies, Division of Humanities. ISBN 9780646073828.
- Bulbeck, Chilla; Williams, Jan (1993). The unintended gender effects of policy and practice on postgraduate research at Griffith University: report. Brisbane, Queensland: Australian Institute for Women's Research and Policy. OCLC 38356390.
- Bulbeck, Chilla; Collins, Janine (1994). The casualisation of research postgraduate employment. Canberra: A.G.P.S. ISBN 9780644426237.
- Bulbeck, Chilla; Auer, Jocelyn; Brugger, Bill (July 1996). Report of the review of the Women's Studies Unit, Flinders University. Adelaide, South Australia: Flinders University of South Australia. OCLC 38413612.
- Bulbeck, Chilla; Kwitko, Ludmilla; Stewart, Anna; Dower, Jo (August 1997). Characteristics of parties involved in domestic violence protection orders: an analysis of court and police data: report. Australia: Criminology Research Grants. 29/94-5. Archived from the original on 29 February 2016. Pdf.
- Bulbeck, Chilla (1998). Proceedings of the Australian Women's Studies Association Seventh Conference. Adelaide, South Australia: Department of Social Inquiry, University of Adelaide. ISBN 9780646356167.
- Bulbeck, Chilla; Auer, Ros (1999). Our town's 'con.con': the Social Inquiry constitutional convention, 15 September 1999. Adelaide, South Australia: Department of Social Inquiry, University of Adelaide. ISBN 9780863968174.
- Bulbeck, Chilla; et al. (1999). Asian migration: Pacific Rim dynamics. Taipei, Taiwan: Kuo li Tʻai-wan ta hsüeh, Ao-chou yen chiu hsiao tsu chʻu pan. ISBN 9789570248586.
