= Merome Beard =

Western Australian politician

Merome Beard MLA

Member of the Western Australian Legislative Assembly for North West Central
- In office 17 September 2022 – 8 March 2025
- Preceded by: Vince Catania

Personal details
- Born: 1966/67
- Party: Liberal Party (from 2023)
- Other political affiliations: National Party (until 2023)
- Nickname: Mem

Merome Beard is an Australian politician who represented the electoral district of North West Central in the Western Australian Legislative Assembly from 17 September 2022 to 8 March 2025. She was elected as a member of the National Party, but she resigned from the party on 31 October 2023 and joined the Liberal Party. She contested the electoral district of Mid-West at the 2025 state election, but was defeated by Nationals leader Shane Love.

== Early life and career ==
Beard is a great-great-granddaughter of Sir Thomas Cockburn-Campbell, the first president of the Western Australian Legislative Council in 1890.

She competed as a rower at the Australian Institute of Sport and went to the 1994 World Championships.

Beard and her husband have owned and ran the Port Hotel in Carnarvon for over twenty years.

== Political career ==
In late June 2022, Beard was selected by the National Party to contest the 2022 North West Central state by-election for them, after incumbent member Vince Catania announced his plans to retire. Her main competitor was Liberal Party candidate Will Baston, with the Labor Party not fielding a candidate.

Beard won the by-election, which took place on 17 September 2022.

On 31 October 2023, Beard resigned from the National Party and joined the Liberal Party, which would put the National and Liberal parties at three seats each in the Legislative Assembly, previously the Nationals had four while the Liberals had two. She claimed the defection was about her "constituents" and not because she wanted to remain in Parliament after her electoral district is abolished.

While campaigning in the 2025 Western Australian state election, her car was stolen and it was used in a ram-raid. She was defeated in the 2025 state election by Nationals leader Shane Love.

Western Australian Legislative Assembly
| Preceded by Vince Catania | Member for North West Central; 2022–2025 | Incumbent |
