= Luke Herdegen =

Australian politician

Luke Herdegen MLA

Member of the Western Australian Legislative Assembly for Secret Harbour
- Incumbent
- Assumed office 29 August 2026
- Preceded by: Paul Papalia

Personal details
- Born: 1986 or 1987 (age 39–40) Newcastle, New South Wales, Australia
- Party: One Nation
- Website: wa.onenation.org.au/luke-herdegen

Luke Herdegen (born 1986 or 1987) is an Australian politician serving as the member for Secret Harbour in the Western Australian Legislative Assembly. A member of One Nation, he won the seat at the 2026 Secret Harbour state by-election, becoming the first One Nation member elected to the Legislative Assembly.

== Early life and career ==
Herdegen was born in Newcastle, New South Wales to Murray and Desley Herdegen. He has said that his grandfather, Ernest William Herdegen, was shot down during the Battle of the Coral Sea and survived for weeks in a raft. He attended Thornton Public School and Francis Greenway High School, and worked as an electrical trade assistant, concreter, traffic controller and marketing consultant before moving to the City of Rockingham in 2023. He worked as a personal trainer and held part-ownership of five Anytime Fitness gym franchises in Perth's southern suburbs, saying after his election that he would step back as a franchisee. He won a national weightlifting title in 2023. At the time of the by-election he lived in Rockingham, just outside the electorate.

== Political career ==
The Secret Harbour by-election followed the resignation of Labor's Paul Papalia, who had represented the seat and its predecessors since 2007 and stood down citing a family member's serious medical diagnosis. Announcing the vacancy, Premier Roger Cook said Labor would "have to fight for our lives" to hold the seat, and The Australian Financial Review reported claims from Labor sources that internal polling had both Labor's and One Nation's primary votes in the mid-30s. Herdegen was announced as One Nation's candidate on 18 July 2026, nine days after Labor endorsed Georgia Tree.

The by-election was held on 29 August 2026, with sixteen candidates nominated. Tree said on election night that the result was too close to call, but Cook conceded the seat the following morning. On the final count, Herdegen polled 39.1 per cent of the primary vote, a swing of more than 30 points to One Nation, and defeated Tree on the two-candidate-preferred count with 57.2 per cent of the vote, an 18.7-point swing. The result gave One Nation its first seat in the Western Australian lower house.

During the campaign, Herdegen was asked on the ABC's 7.30 about comments by party leader Pauline Hanson characterising domestic violence as running in both directions, and replied that "it's not something that anyone is talking about in the community here". In September 2026, a satirical workout protest dubbed "The Bro-Test", organised in response to the remarks, was held outside Parliament House; Herdegen, who watched but did not take part, said he had been referring to a lack of local discussion of Hanson's comments and that he believed all people should be protected from domestic violence. He told The West Australian he intended to prove his critics wrong and cast himself as a defender of women's rights, which he said meant "keeping men out of women's spaces".

Herdegen gave his inaugural speech to the Legislative Assembly on 22 October 2026, in which he said One Nation intended to govern in Western Australia and predicted that more of its members would join him in the Assembly. He likened his position to that of David Brand, who he said had been the first elected member of a newly formed conservative party when he entered the Assembly in 1945, and who later became premier. He criticised Labor as complacent and out of touch with Western Australians amid cost-of-living pressures, and said Perth's outer suburbs had been left behind for decades on infrastructure and living standards. He also spoke against gender-identity politics and mass immigration, and rejected accusations that One Nation was racist. Reports on the speech compared his line "We will stand up against mass immigration if you try to swamp our nation with immigrants" with Hanson's 1996 maiden speech, in which she said Australia was at risk of being "swamped by Asians".

Western Australian Legislative Assembly
Preceded by Paul Papalia	Member for Secret Harbour; 2026–present	Incumbent
