= Reece Whitby =

Australian politician

Reece Whitby MLA

Member of the Western Australian Legislative Assembly for Baldivis
- Incumbent
- Assumed office 11 March 2017
- Preceded by: new seat

Personal details
- Born: 29 May 1964 (age 62) Perth, Western Australia
- Party: Labor
- Occupation: Journalist
- Website: www.reecewhitby.com.au

Reece Raymond Whitby (born 29 May 1964) is an Australian politician. He has been a Labor member of the Western Australian Legislative Assembly since the 2017 state election, representing Baldivis. Shortly after the 2017 election, Whitby was appointed by Premier of Western Australia Mark McGowan as Parliamentary Secretary to the Treasurer and Minister for Energy and Finance, and as Parliamentary Secretary to the Minister for Environment and Disability Services. Whitby was re-elected to the seat of Baldivis in the 2021 state election, and he was appointed to the Second McGowan Ministry, becoming the Minister of Emergency Services; Racing and Gaming, Small Business and Volunteering.

10 months into the second McGowan Ministry, Whitby was elevated to the Environment and Climate Action portfolio, having been left vacant by Amber-Jade Sanderson taking on the Health portfolios. At the end of 2023, Whitby added the Energy portfolio to his area of responsibility.

Whitby was raised in Balga, Western Australia, and attended North Balga Primary School and Greenwood Senior High School. Before entering politics he was a journalist at the South Western Times in Bunbury, the Australian Broadcasting Corporation, Nine Network and Seven Network. In 2008 and 2013 he ran unsuccessfully as the Labor candidate for the state Legislative Assembly electoral district of Morley.

Whitby is married to Supreme Court of Western Australia Justice Natalie Whitby. They have four children.

Whitby is one of four Labor MPs in state parliament that is not factionally aligned as of 2025.

Whitby worked for the Seven Network before his political career.

Western Australian Legislative Assembly
New seat	Member for Baldivis; 2017–present	Incumbent
