= Electoral district of Baldivis =

State electoral district of Western Australia

Baldivis Western Australia—Legislative Assembly
- Interactive map of electoral district boundaries from the 2025 state election
- State: Western Australia
- Dates current: 2017–present
- MP: Reece Whitby
- Party: Labor
- Namesake: Baldivis
- Electors: 31,087 (2025)
- Area: 59 km^{2} (22.8 sq mi)
- Demographic: Metropolitan
- Coordinates: 31.33°S 115.93°E
Electorates around Baldivis:
Rockingham	Rockingham	Kwinana
Indian Ocean	Baldivis	Darling Range
Secret Harbour	Secret Harbour	Darling Range

Baldivis is an electoral district of the Legislative Assembly of Western Australia. It is located in Perth's southern suburbs, and named after the suburb of Baldivis.

Baldivis was created by the Western Australian Electoral Commission in a 2015 redistribution, and elected its first member at the 2017 state election. It incorporated areas that previously fell into the seats of Kwinana and Warnbro. Baldivis was estimated to have a notional 6.4-point majority for the Labor Party (based on the results of the 2013 election), and was considered a safe seat for that party.

== Geography ==
At the 2021 state election, Baldivis includes parts of the suburbs of Baldivis, Cooloongup, Leda, Waikiki and Wellard.

The 2023 redistribution saw Baldivis lose Leda and Wellard as well as part of its namesake suburb to the electoral districts of Kwinana and Darling Range while gaining Warnbro and a part of Karnup from Warnbro, leading to the latter electorate requiring a name change.

== Members for Baldivis ==
Member	Party	Term
Reece Whitby	Labor	2017–present

== Election results ==
2025 Western Australian state election: Baldivis
Party	Candidate	Votes	%	±%
Labor	Reece Whitby	12,546	50.7	−28.4
Liberal	Dylan Mbano	5,193	21.0	+11.9
Greens	Annabelle Newbury	2,491	10.1	+6.4
One Nation	Dylan Vermeulen	2,023	8.2	+6.0
Legalise Cannabis	Mark Charles	1,285	5.2	+5.2
Christians	Yvette Holmes	739	3.0	+3.0
Shooters, Fishers, Farmers	Phillip Da Silva	460	1.9	+1.9
Total formal votes		24,737	95.2	−1.3
Informal votes		1,252	4.8	+1.3
Turnout		25,989	83.6	+4.8
Two-party-preferred result
Labor	Reece Whitby	16,480	66.7	−19.1
Liberal	Dylan Mbano	8,240	33.3	+19.1
Labor hold		Swing	−19.1	
