= Electoral district of Central Wheatbelt =

State electoral district of Western Australia

Central Wheatbelt Western Australia—Legislative Assembly
- Interactive map of electoral district boundaries from the 2025 state election
- State: Western Australia
- Dates current: 2008–present
- MP: Lachlan Hunter
- Party: National
- Namesake: Wheatbelt region
- Electors: 32,155 (2025)
- Area: 97,953 km^{2} (37,819.9 sq mi)
- Demographic: Rural
- Coordinates: 31.41°S 117.91°E
Electorates around Central Wheatbelt:
Mid-West	Mid-West	Kalgoorlie
Swan Hills; Kalamunda	Central Wheatbelt	Kalgoorlie
Darling Range; Murray-Wellington; Collie-Preston	Roe	Roe

Central Wheatbelt is an electoral district of the Legislative Assembly in the Australian state of Western Australia.

The district is centrally located in the Wheatbelt region of Western Australia.

Politically, Central Wheatbelt is a safe National Party seat.

== History ==
Central Wheatbelt was first created for the 2008 state election. It was essentially an amalgamation of the abolished National-held districts of Avon and Merredin, although parts of each ended up in neighbouring districts. Roughly half the new district's voters came from each of the two former districts.

The original proposal had the newly created district persisting with the name Merredin. However, this was the focus of several objections, as Merredin is but one town in the eastern part of this sizeable electorate. Instead, the more generic name of Central Wheatbelt was adopted.

== Geography ==
Central Wheatbelt incorporates a number of rural inland shires to the east of Perth. Its population centres include Ballidu, Beacon, Beverley, Dowerin, Koorda, Meckering, Merredin, Narembeen, Northam, Pingelly, Southern Cross, Tammin, Westonia, Wongan Hills, Wundowie, Wyalkatchem and York.

== Members for Central Wheatbelt ==
Member	Party	Term
Brendon Grylls	National	2008–2013
Mia Davies	National	2013–2025
Lachlan Hunter	National	2025–present

== Election results ==
2025 Western Australian state election: Central Wheatbelt
Party	Candidate	Votes	%	±%
National	Lachlan Hunter	12,417	46.7	+1.3
Labor	Rebecca Atkinson	5,314	20.0	−14.8
Liberal	Lance French	3,928	14.8	+5.8
One Nation	Peter Lines	2,475	9.3	+7.3
Greens	Peter Stephen Leam	1,447	5.4	+3.2
Christians	Les Holten	1,030	3.9	+2.2
Total formal votes		26,611	96.5	+0.6
Informal votes		976	3.5	−0.6
Turnout		27,587	85.8	+4.1
Two-candidate-preferred result
National	Lachlan Hunter	19,490	73.3	+14.1
Labor	Rebecca Atkinson	7,096	26.7	−14.1
National hold		Swing	+14.1	
