= Small Business Party (2016) =

Political party in Australia

- Leader: John Golawski
- Party President: John Golawski
- Founded: 2016
- Headquarters: Perth
- Ideology: Western Australian secessionism

Website
- waxit.org

The Small Business Party (formerly Micro Business Party and WAxit Party) is a political party registered in the Australian state of Western Australia. The party's primary platform is secessionism of Western Australia from the Federation.

== History ==
An earlier Small Business Party of Western Australia merged into the Micro Business Party (established in 2016) before the 2017 state election.

In the 2017 Western Australian election, the Micro Business Party fielded 46 candidates in the Legislative Assembly (out of 59 electorates) and 14 candidates across the six regions for the Legislative Council. The party received 13,211 first preference votes for Legislative Assembly seats (representing 1% of votes cast), and 7,484 votes for the Legislative Council.

The party changed its name to Small Business Party at its May 2018 annual general meeting and the new name was officially recognised by the Western Australian Electoral Commission in October 2018.

In 2021, the Small Business Party became the WAxit Party, with the "objective ... to improve the fortunes of [Western Australians] by achieving autonomy and independence through secession from the Federation." The WAxit party failed to achieve representation in either of Western Australia's two houses, gaining 7,979 first preference votes in the Legislative Assembly, and 4,326 in the Legislative Council.

The name WAxit is derived from WA (the state abbreviation and a nickname for Western Australia) and the word "exit", in the same style as the word Brexit.

In 2022, the party reverted to the name Small Business Party and contested the North-West Central by-election in the same year.
