= Vince Catania =

Australian politician (born 1977)

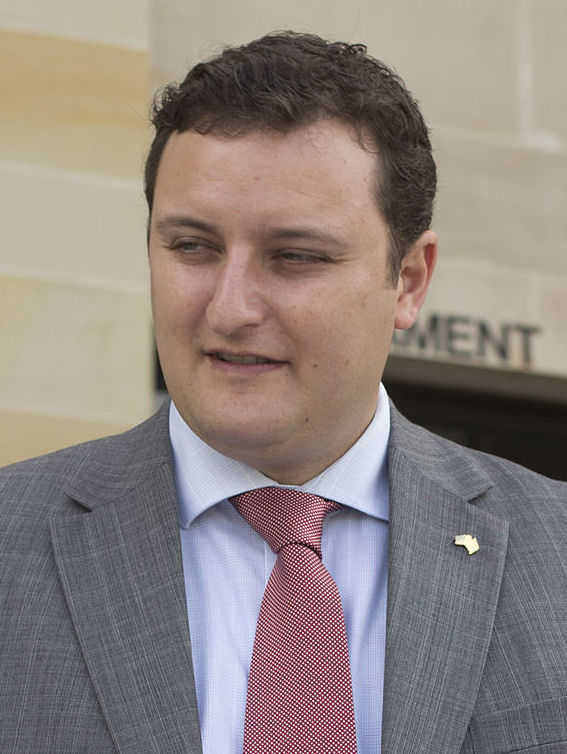
- Catania outside Parliament House, Perth

Member of the Western Australian Legislative Assembly for North West Central
- In office 9 March 2013 – 8 August 2022
- Preceded by: Seat established
- Succeeded by: Merome Beard

Member of the Western Australian Legislative Assembly for North West
- In office 23 September 2008 – 9 March 2013
- Preceded by: Seat established
- Succeeded by: Seat abolished

Member of the Legislative Council of Western Australia
- In office 22 May 2005 – 12 August 2008 Serving with Archer, Baston, Ford, Moore
- Constituency: Mining and Pastoral Region

Personal details
- Born: Vincent Alexander Catania; 23 February 1977 (age 49) Perth, Western Australia, Australia
- Party: Labor (to 2009); National (from 2009)
- Relations: Steve Catania (brother)
- Parent: Nick Catania

Vincent Alexander Catania (born 23 February 1977) is an Australian former politician who was a member of the Legislative Assembly of Western Australia from 2008 to 2022. He was previously a member of the Legislative Council from 2005 to 2008. Catania represented the Labor Party until July 2009, when he switched to the National Party.

== Early life ==
Catania was born in Perth to Rita (née Tonus) and Nicholas Mark Catania. His Italian-born father was also a state member of parliament, representing the Labor Party. His brother is a Labor politician who was elected for the seat of Midland in the 2025 Western Australian state election.

Catania attended Trinity College. Prior to entering parliament, he served as state president of the Young Labor movement, and also held various positions in branch offices.

== Politics ==
Catania was elected to parliament at the 2005 state election, running in third position on the Labor ticket in the Mining and Pastoral Region. He was 28 years old when his term began in May 2005, making him the youngest person ever to sit in the Legislative Council. At the 2008 state election, Catania switched to the Legislative Assembly, winning the seat of North West. This also made him the youngest person to serve in both houses of the Parliament of Western Australia. However, in July 2009, Catania announced that he would be leaving the Labor Party and joining the National Party. He cited dissatisfaction with Eric Ripper, the Labor leader, and concerns that Labor had become too "city-centric".

In a redistribution prior to 2013 state election, the North West electorate was abolished and replaced with the new seat of North West Central. The new electorate remained a marginal seat, with a notional non-Labor majority of 3.3 points. At the election, Catania and the Nationals received a 21.0-point swing on first preferences, with Labor being relegated to third place behind the Liberals. The final two-candidate-preferred count had the Nationals winning 59.7 percent of the vote. In December 2013, a few months after the election, Catania was made parliamentary secretary to Mia Davies, the new Minister for Water and Minister for Forestry. He has also served two terms as the National Party whip.

In June 2022, he announced his intention to resign from parliament in August to spend more time with his family. He tendered his resignation to the speaker on 8 August.

== Business career ==
In 2022, Catania joined rare earth metals explorer Hastings Technology Metals as general manager of corporate affairs. He was promoted to chief executive officer in 2025.

== Personal life ==
Catania is married and has five children.

== See also ==
- Members of the Western Australian Legislative Assembly
- Members of the Western Australian Legislative Council

Western Australian Legislative Assembly
New seat	Member for North West; 2008–2013	Abolished
New seat	Member for North West Central; 2013–2022	Succeeded by Merome Beard
