= Shane Love =

Australian politician

Shane Love MLA
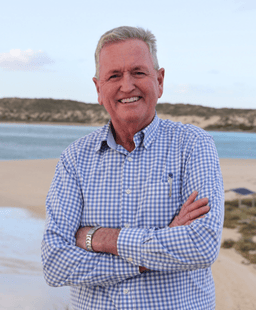
- Love in 2025

37th Leader of the Opposition in Western Australia Elections: 2025
- In office 30 January 2023 – 25 March 2025
- Premier: Mark McGowan (2023); Roger Cook (2023–2025)
- Deputy: Peter Rundle
- Preceded by: Mia Davies
- Succeeded by: Basil Zempilas

16th Leader of the Nationals Party in Western Australia
- Incumbent
- Assumed office 30 January 2023
- Deputy: Peter Rundle
- Preceded by: Mia Davies

Member of the Western Australian Legislative Assembly for Mid-West (2025–present) Moore (2013–2025)
- Incumbent
- Assumed office 9 March 2013
- Preceded by: Grant Woodhams
Party leadership positions
Deputy Leader of the Opposition
In office 13 March 2021 – 30 January 2023
Leader	Mia Davies
Preceded by	Libby Mettam
Succeeded by	Peter Rundle
Deputy Leader of the Nationals WA
In office 10 March 2020 – 30 January 2023
Preceded by	Jacqui Boydell
Succeeded by	Peter Rundle
Parliamentary Secretary for Regional Development and Lands
In office 8 December 2014 – 11 March 2017
Leader	Terry Redman; Brendon Grylls; Mia Davies
Preceded by	Vince Catania
Succeeded by	Martin Aldridge
Ministerial offices
Shadow Minister for Federal-State Relations Government Accountability
Incumbent
Assumed office 7 February 2023
Premier	Mark McGowan; Roger Cook
Assistant Minister for State Development
In office 8 December 2014 – 27 March 2017
Premier	Colin Barnett
Preceded by	Bill Marmion
Succeeded by	Alannah MacTiernan

Personal details
- Born: Ronald Shane Love; 30 August 1961 (age 65) Kerang, Victoria, Australia
- Party: The Nationals WA
- Education: University of Western Australia (BComm)
- Profession: Politician, farmer

Ronald Shane Love (born 30 August 1961) is an Australian politician. He is a member of the Western Australian Legislative Assembly seat of Mid-West, representing the National Party of Australia (WA) and is a former leader of the opposition of Western Australia.

== Early life ==
Love was born on 30 August 1961 in Kerang, Victoria. He moved to Western Australia in 1974.

== Political career ==
Before entering state politics, Love was active in local government for more than 12 years. He served as the Dandaragan Shire President from 2004 until 2013.

On 10 March 2020, Love was elected as deputy party leader, replacing Jacqui Boydell.

On 30 January 2023, Love was elected as the leader of the National Party, replacing Mia Davies after she resigned. This also made him the leader of the opposition, as the National Party held more seats than the Liberal Party.

Despite being leader of the opposition, Love was not included in opinion polls on the question of preferred premier and approval ratings with political observers not believing he would ever be premier as it is deemed unlikely the Nationals will ever outperform the Labor and Liberal parties in future elections.

In the 2025 Western Australian state election, he was elected in the newly created seat of Mid-West. Love was replaced as leader of the opposition by Basil Zempilas after the election.

== Political positions ==
=== Indigenous Voice to Parliament ===
Love formerly supported the Indigenous Voice to Parliament, but changed to opposing the Voice in August 2023.

=== Live Exports ===
Love opposes the Australian Labor Party's effort to phase out Live Exports nationwide by 2028, claiming that potentially thousands of Jobs are at risk if implemented.

Western Australian Legislative Assembly
Preceded by Grant Woodhams	Member for Moore; 2013–2025	District abolished
New district	Member for Mid-West; 2025–present	Incumbent
Political offices
Preceded by Mia Davies	Leader of the Opposition in Western Australia; 2023–2025	Succeeded by Basil Zempilas
Party political offices
Preceded by Mia Davies	Leader of the National Party of Western Australia; 2023–present	Incumbent
