= Western Australian Legislative Assembly =

State legislature in Perth, Australia

Legislative Assembly
- 42nd Parliament

Type
- Type: Lower house of the Parliament of Western Australia

History
- Founded: 30 December 1890; 135 years ago

Leadership
- Speaker: Stephen Price, Labor since 8 April 2025
- Deputy Speaker: Ali Kent, Labor since 8 April 2025
- Leader of the House: David Michael, Labor since 8 April 2025
- Manager of Opposition Business: Libby Mettam, Liberal since 8 April 2025
- Government Whip: Terry Healy, Labor since 8 April 2025
- Opposition Whip: Liam Staltari, Liberal since 8 April 2025

Structure
- Seats: 59
- Political groups: Government (45); Labor (45); Opposition (12) (Note: After the 2025 election, the Nationals and Liberals formed an opposition alliance. However, it is not a formal coalition and both parties maintain their independence from each other.); Liberal (6); National (6); Crossbench; One Nation (1); Independent (1)
- Length of term: 4 years

Elections
- Voting system: Full preferential voting
- First election: December 1890
- Last election: 8 March 2025
- Next election: 10 March 2029

Meeting place
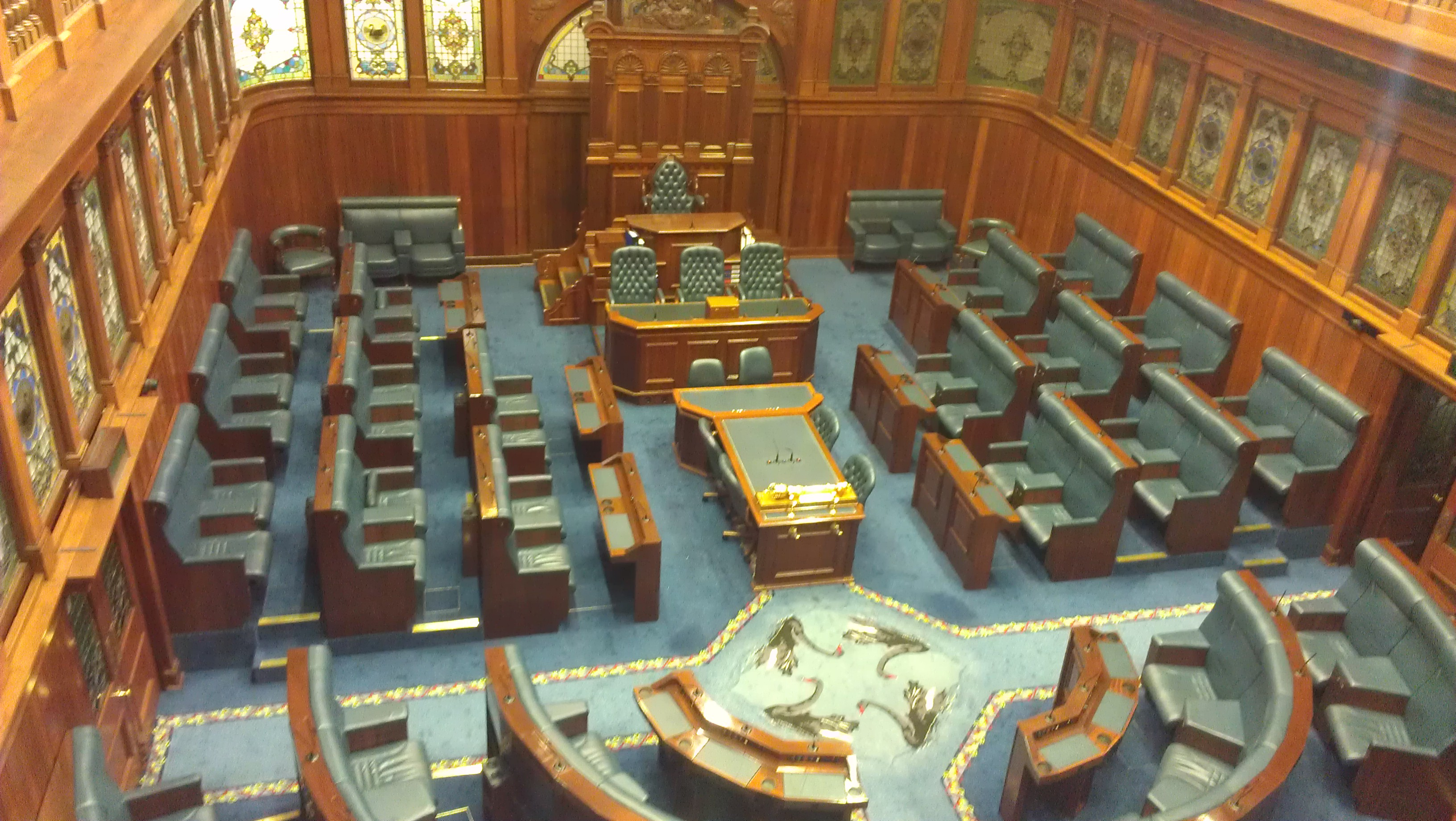
- Legislative Assembly Chamber; Parliament House, Perth; Western Australia, Australia

Website
- WA Legislative Assembly

The Western Australian Legislative Assembly, or lower house, is one of the two chambers of the Parliament of Western Australia, an Australian state. The Parliament sits in Parliament House in the Western Australian capital, Perth.

The Legislative Assembly today has 59 members, elected for four-year terms from single-member electoral districts. Members are elected using the preferential voting system. As with all other Australian states and territories, voting is compulsory for all Australian citizens over the legal voting age of 18.

== Role and operation ==
Most legislation in Western Australia is initiated in the Legislative Assembly. The party or coalition that can command a majority in the Legislative Assembly is invited by the Governor to form a government. That party or coalition's leader, once sworn in, subsequently becomes the Premier of Western Australia, and a team of the leader's, party's or coalition's choosing (whether they be in the Legislative Assembly or in the Legislative Council) can then be sworn in as ministers responsible for various portfolios. As Australian political parties traditionally vote along party lines, most legislation introduced by the governing party will pass through the House of Assembly.

== History ==
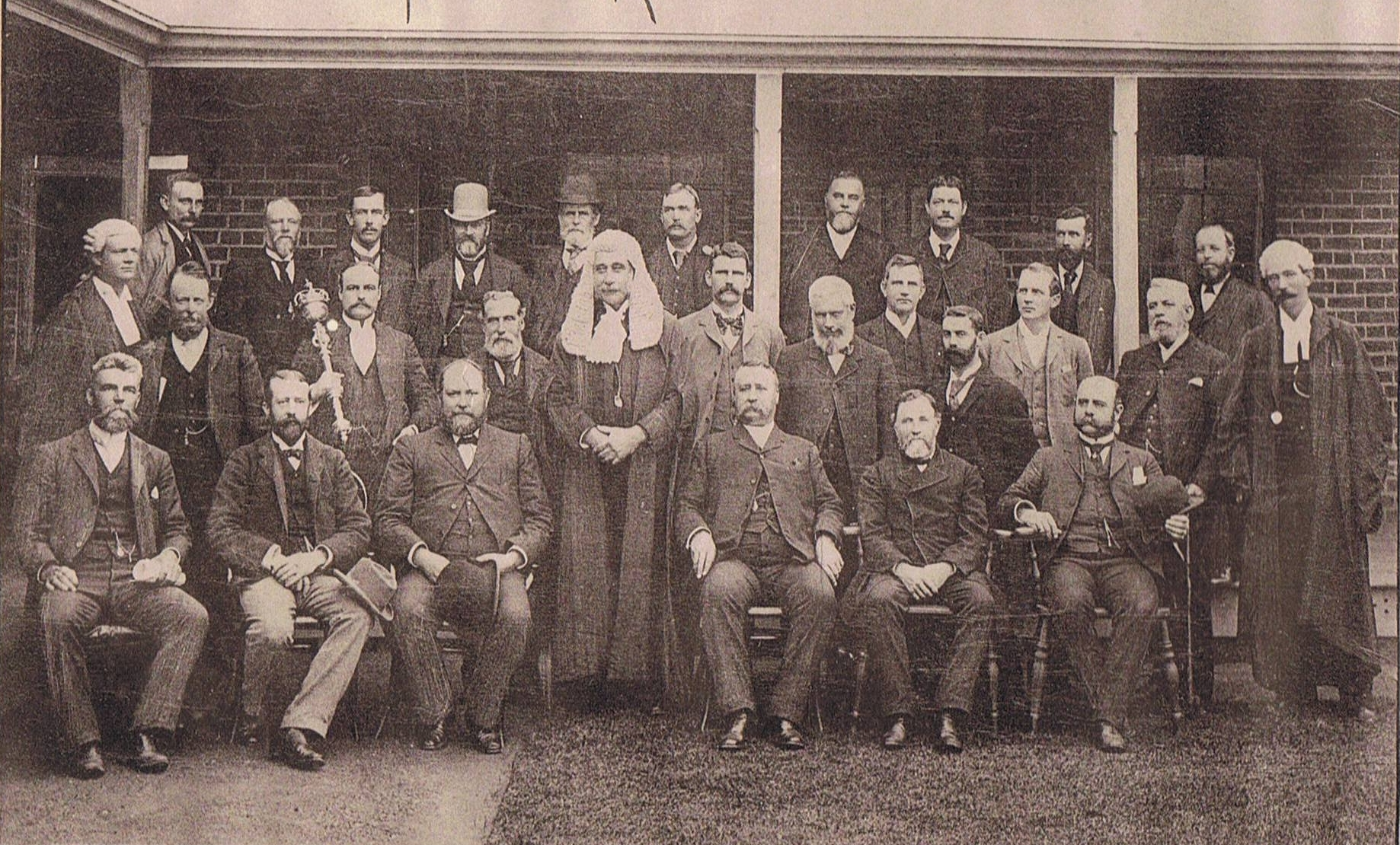
Members of the Western Australian Legislative Assembly, 1896

The Legislative Assembly was the first elected legislature in Western Australia, having been created in 1890, when Western Australia gained self-government. It initially consisted of 30 members, all of whom were elected, although only male landowners could vote. This replaced a system where the Governor was responsible for most legislative matters, with only the appointed Legislative Council to guide him.

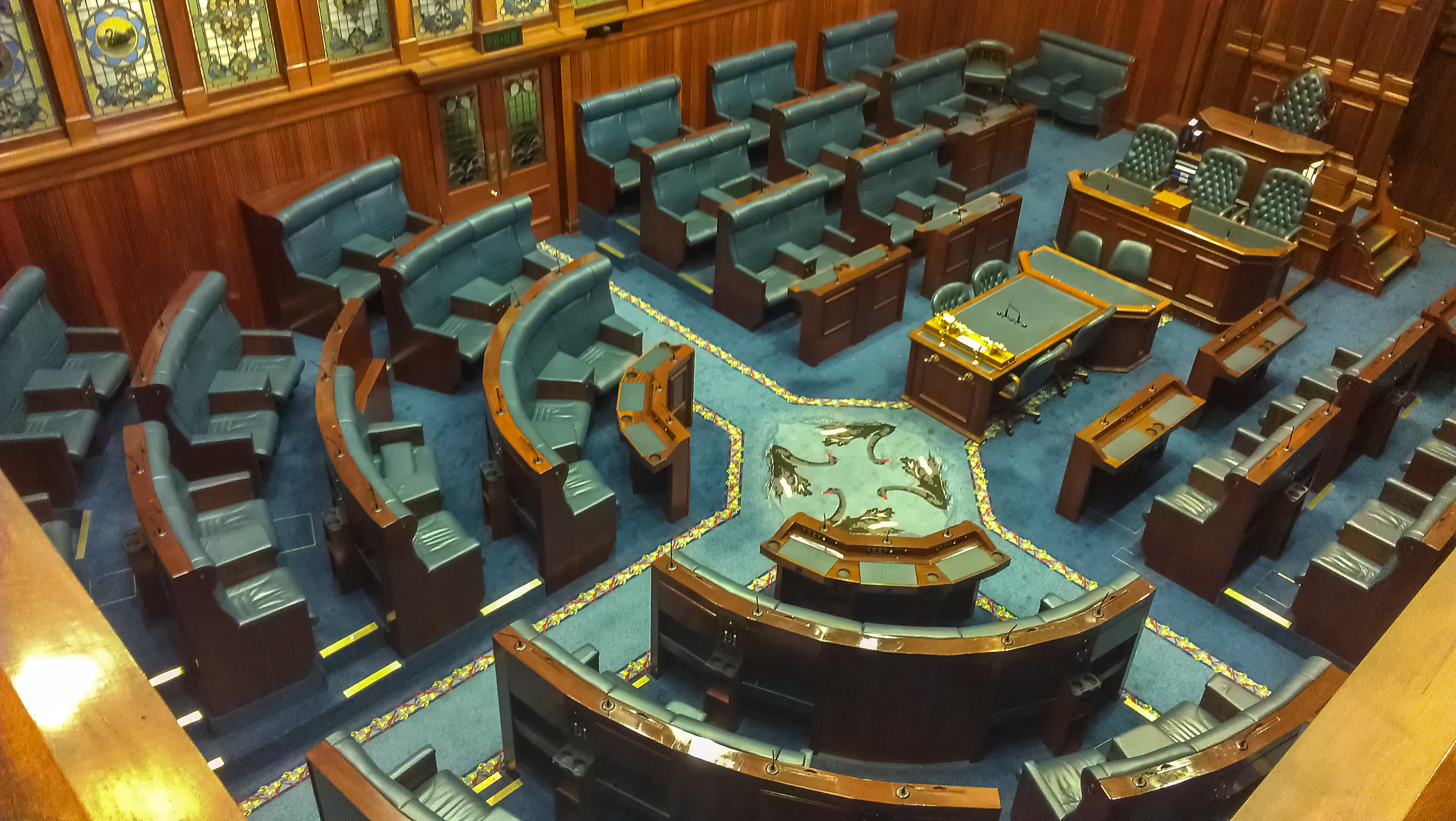
Legislative Assembly – 4 November 2012

Suffrage was extended to all adult males in 1893, although Indigenous Australians were specifically excluded. Women gained the right to vote in 1899, making Western Australia the second of the Australian colonies (behind South Australia) to do so. In 1921, Edith Cowan became the first woman to be elected to parliament anywhere in Australia when she won the Legislative Assembly seat of West Perth for the Nationalist Party.

== Electoral distribution and reform ==
For many years, Western Australia used a zonal electoral system for both houses of parliament. In most Australian jurisdictions, each state electorate represents an approximately equal number of voters. However, in Western Australia, until 2008 an MP represented 28,519 voters in greater Perth (the Metropolitan Region Scheme area) or 14,551 country voters. At the 2006 census taken on 8 August 2006, 73.76% of Western Australia's residents lived in and around Perth, but only 34 of Western Australia's 57 Legislative Assembly seats, representing 60% of the total, were located in the metropolitan region. There has been strong support over time in some quarters for the principle of one vote, one value, particularly from the Labor Party who were at particular disadvantage under the system. Up until 2005, reform had proceeded gradually—the most dramatic changes had occurred with the enactment of the Electoral Districts Act 1947 and the Acts Amendment (Electoral Reform) Act 1987, the latter of which raised the number of metropolitan seats from 29 to 34.

Effective on 20 May 2005, the Electoral Amendment and Repeal Act 2005 (No.1 of 2005) abolished the country-metropolitan distinction for the Legislative Assembly, but all seats then in place remained until the following election on 6 September 2008. A redistribution of seats announced by the Western Australian Electoral Commission on 29 October 2007 places 42 seats in Perth and 17 in the country, with a variation of ±10% from the average population normally permitted. The only distinction for rural seats is that any seat with an area of 100,000 square kilometres (38,610 sq mi) or greater (that is, 4% of the State's land area) may have a variation of +10%–20% from the average, using an adjusted population based on the seat's area in square kilometres.

== Current distribution of Assembly seats ==
Party	Seats held
Labor	45
Liberal	6
National	6
One Nation	1
Independent	1
Total	59

30 votes as a majority are required to pass legislation.

== See also ==
- 2025 Western Australian state election
- Members of the Western Australian Legislative Assembly
  - Members of the Western Australian Legislative Assembly, 2025–2029
- Speaker of the Western Australian Legislative Assembly
- Electoral districts of Western Australia
- Western Australian Legislative Council
- Parliaments of the Australian states and territories
