= Results of the 2025 Western Australian state election (Legislative Assembly) =

This is a list of electoral district results for the 2025 Western Australian state election.

Percentages, margins and swings are calculated on notional estimates based on analysis of the redistributed electoral boundaries by the ABC's Antony Green for the Western Australian Parliamentary Library.

== Statewide results ==
Results by electoral district as of 8 March (shaded by winning party). Labor Liberal National

| Party | Votes | % | +/– | Seats | +/– |
|---|---|---|---|---|---|
| Labor | 633,093 | 41.43 | ▼18.49 | 46 | ▼7 |
| Liberal | 428,105 | 28.02 | ▲6.71 | 7 | ▲5 |
| Greens | 169,007 | 11.06 | ▲4.14 | 0 | 0 |
| National | 78,753 | 5.15 | ▲1.16 | 6 | ▲2 |
| One Nation | 61,174 | 4.00 | ▲2.74 | 0 | 0 |
| Independents | 50,488 | 3.30 | ▲2.50 | 0 | 0 |
| Australian Christians | 48,407 | 3.17 | ▲1.69 | 0 | 0 |
| Legalise Cannabis | 37,864 | 2.48 | ▲2.12 | 0 | 0 |
| Shooters, Fishers and Farmers | 11,253 | 0.74 | ▲0.05 | 0 | 0 |
| Animal Justice Party | 6,878 | 0.45 | ▲0.45 | 0 | 0 |
| Stop Pedophiles! Protect kiddies! | 2,021 | 0.13 | ▲0.13 | 0 | 0 |
| Libertarian | 928 | 0.06 | ▲0.06 | 0 | 0 |
| Total | 1,527,971 | 100.00 | – | 59 | – |
| Valid votes | 1,527,971 | 95.68 | ▼0.56 | | |
| Invalid/blank votes | 69,071 | 4.32 | ▲0.56 | | |
| Total votes | 1,597,042 | 100.00 | – | | |
| Registered voters/turnout | 1,868,946 | 85.45 | ▼0.01 | | |

== Results by electoral district ==
=== Albany ===
2025 Western Australian state election: Albany
| Party | Candidate | Votes | % | ±% |
|---|---|---|---|---|
| Labor | Rebecca Stephens | 8,825 | 29.9 | −18.8 |
| National | Scott Leary | 6,496 | 22.0 | +7.4 |
| Liberal | Tom Brough | 6,451 | 21.8 | +4.8 |
| Greens | Lynn MacLaren | 2,348 | 7.9 | +2.4 |
| Independent | Mario Lionetti | 2,121 | 7.2 | +7.2 |
| Christians | Gerrit Ballast | 1,504 | 5.1 | +0.4 |
| One Nation | Quintin Bisschoff | 813 | 2.8 | +0.2 |
| Legalise Cannabis | Philip Arnatt | 693 | 2.3 | +0.5 |
| Shooters, Fishers, Farmers | Synjon Anstee-Brook | 311 | 1.1 | −1.3 |
| Total formal votes | | 29,562 | 96.6 | −0.0 |
| Informal votes | | 1,050 | 3.4 | +0.0 |
| Turnout | | 30,612 | 90.4 | +5.2 |
Two-candidate-preferred result
| National | Scott Leary | 16,615 | 56.3 | +56.3 |
| Labor | Rebecca Stephens | 12,914 | 43.7 | −17.3 |
| National gain from Labor | | | | |

=== Armadale ===
2025 Western Australian state election: Armadale
| Party | Candidate | Votes | % | ±% |
|---|---|---|---|---|
| Labor | Tony Buti | 13,141 | 52.5 | −20.6 |
| Liberal | Jason McNamara | 4,374 | 17.5 | +8.4 |
| Greens | Shelley Harrington | 3,033 | 12.1 | +7.4 |
| One Nation | Elizabeth Ierardi | 2,060 | 8.2 | +5.6 |
| Christians | Arthur Kleyn | 1,750 | 7.0 | +1.5 |
| Stop Pedophiles | C. Ling | 673 | 2.7 | +2.7 |
| Total formal votes | | 25,031 | 94.6 | −0.8 |
| Informal votes | | 1,441 | 5.4 | +0.8 |
| Turnout | | 26,472 | 81.0 | +2.5 |
Two-party-preferred result
| Labor | Tony Buti | 17,223 | 68.9 | −15.0 |
| Liberal | Jason McNamara | 7,792 | 31.1 | +15.0 |
| Labor hold | | Swing | −15.0 | |

=== Balcatta ===
2025 Western Australian state election: Balcatta
| Party | Candidate | Votes | % | ±% |
|---|---|---|---|---|
| Labor | David Michael | 12,404 | 49.4 | −17.1 |
| Liberal | James Helliwell | 6,500 | 25.9 | +7.1 |
| Greens | Trevor Don | 3,120 | 12.4 | +4.8 |
| One Nation | David Potter | 1,055 | 4.2 | +4.2 |
| Legalise Cannabis | Chris Cole | 896 | 3.6 | +3.6 |
| Christians | Wesley D'Costa | 632 | 2.5 | +0.4 |
| Shooters, Fishers, Farmers | Robert Hollier | 514 | 2.0 | +2.0 |
| Total formal votes | | 25,121 | 95.0 | −0.1 |
| Informal votes | | 1,318 | 5.0 | +0.1 |
| Turnout | | 26,439 | 86.6 | +3.2 |
Two-party-preferred result
| Labor | David Michael | 16,192 | 64.5 | −11.2 |
| Liberal | James Helliwell | 8,908 | 35.5 | +11.2 |
| Labor hold | | Swing | −11.2 | |

=== Baldivis ===
2025 Western Australian state election: Baldivis
| Party | Candidate | Votes | % | ±% |
|---|---|---|---|---|
| Labor | Reece Whitby | 12,546 | 50.7 | −28.4 |
| Liberal | Dylan Mbano | 5,193 | 21.0 | +11.9 |
| Greens | Annabelle Newbury | 2,491 | 10.1 | +6.4 |
| One Nation | Dylan Vermeulen | 2,023 | 8.2 | +6.0 |
| Legalise Cannabis | Mark Charles | 1,285 | 5.2 | +5.2 |
| Christians | Yvette Holmes | 739 | 3.0 | +3.0 |
| Shooters, Fishers, Farmers | Phillip Da Silva | 460 | 1.9 | +1.9 |
| Total formal votes | | 24,737 | 95.2 | −1.3 |
| Informal votes | | 1,252 | 4.8 | +1.3 |
| Turnout | | 25,989 | 83.6 | +4.8 |
Two-party-preferred result
| Labor | Reece Whitby | 16,480 | 66.7 | −19.1 |
| Liberal | Dylan Mbano | 8,240 | 33.3 | +19.1 |
| Labor hold | | Swing | −19.1 | |

=== Bassendean ===
2025 Western Australian state election: Bassendean
| Party | Candidate | Votes | % | ±% |
|---|---|---|---|---|
| Labor | Dave Kelly | 13,961 | 52.3 | −19.0 |
| Liberal | Ash Kumar | 4,220 | 15.8 | +3.7 |
| Independent | Renée McLennan | 3,083 | 11.5 | +11.5 |
| Greens | Callan Gray | 2,854 | 10.7 | +2.9 |
| One Nation | Chris Fenech | 1,301 | 4.9 | +2.9 |
| Christians | David Kingston | 1,300 | 4.9 | +1.9 |
| Total formal votes | | 26,719 | 95.1 | −0.3 |
| Informal votes | | 1,388 | 4.9 | +0.3 |
| Turnout | | 28,107 | 86.1 | +3.0 |
Notional two-party-preferred count (Note: Estimated two-party-preferred count by Antony Green.)
| Labor | Dave Kelly | 19,882 | 74.5 | −7.2 |
| Liberal | Ash Kumar | 6,820 | 25.5 | +7.2 |
Two-candidate-preferred result
| Labor | Dave Kelly | 17,532 | 65.7 | −16.0 |
| Independent | Renée McLennan | 9,163 | 34.3 | +34.3 |
| Labor hold | | | | |

=== Bateman ===
2025 Western Australian state election: Bateman
| Party | Candidate | Votes | % | ±% |
|---|---|---|---|---|
| Labor | Kim Giddens | 11,093 | 40.2 | −5.6 |
| Liberal | Nitin Vashisht | 9,455 | 34.3 | −2.7 |
| Greens | Juanita Doorey | 2,910 | 10.5 | +3.7 |
| National | Donna Gordin | 1,689 | 6.1 | +6.1 |
| Christians | Kirsty Robbie | 1,000 | 3.6 | +0.7 |
| One Nation | Michael Mabood | 478 | 1.7 | +0.9 |
| Independent | Tony Stokes | 431 | 1.6 | +1.6 |
| Animal Justice | Colleen Saporita | 353 | 1.3 | +1.3 |
| Libertarian | Anahita Ghassemifar | 180 | 0.7 | −0.6 |
| Total formal votes | | 27,589 | 96.6 | −0.6 |
| Informal votes | | 962 | 3.4 | +0.6 |
| Turnout | | 28,551 | 90.5 | +2.9 |
Two-party-preferred result
| Labor | Kim Giddens | 14,700 | 53.3 | −3.4 |
| Liberal | Nitin Vashisht | 12,881 | 46.7 | +3.4 |
| Labor hold | | Swing | −3.4 | |

=== Belmont ===
2025 Western Australian state election: Belmont
| Party | Candidate | Votes | % | ±% |
|---|---|---|---|---|
| Labor | Cassie Rowe | 12,807 | 53.6 | −17.2 |
| Liberal | Biju Anthony | 5,492 | 23.0 | +7.2 |
| Greens | Helen Olivieri | 3,656 | 15.3 | +8.5 |
| One Nation | Liviu Filip Tomules | 1,237 | 5.2 | +3.3 |
| Christians | Nathanael Yap | 718 | 3.0 | +0.6 |
| Total formal votes | | 23,910 | 94.8 | −1.1 |
| Informal votes | | 1,310 | 5.2 | +1.1 |
| Turnout | | 25,220 | 81.2 | +2.5 |
Two-party-preferred result
| Labor | Cassie Rowe | 16,577 | 69.4 | −10.1 |
| Liberal | Biju Anthony | 7,326 | 30.6 | +10.1 |
| Labor hold | | Swing | −10.1 | |

=== Bibra Lake ===
2025 Western Australian state election: Bibra Lake
| Party | Candidate | Votes | % | ±% |
|---|---|---|---|---|
| Labor | Sook Yee Lai | 10,664 | 41.8 | −23.9 |
| Liberal | Atul Garg | 4,450 | 17.5 | −0.0 |
| Greens | Robyn Walsh | 4,282 | 16.8 | +6.5 |
| Independent | Michael Separovich | 2,059 | 8.1 | +8.1 |
| Independent | Lisa Griffiths | 1,288 | 5.1 | +5.1 |
| One Nation | Bradley Dickinson | 1,063 | 4.2 | +2.8 |
| Legalise Cannabis | Bradley Gibb | 926 | 3.6 | +3.6 |
| Christians | Leon Yeap | 753 | 3.0 | +3.0 |
| Total formal votes | | 25,485 | 94.4 | −1.8 |
| Informal votes | | 1,512 | 5.6 | +1.8 |
| Turnout | | 26,997 | 84.2 | +0.8 |
Notional two-party-preferred count
| Labor | Sook Yee Lai | 18,193 | 71.4 | −6.7 |
| Liberal | Atul Garg | 7,292 | 28.6 | +6.7 |
Two-candidate-preferred result
| Labor | Sook Yee Lai | 16,339 | 64.2 | −13.9 |
| Greens | Robyn Walsh | 9,092 | 35.8 | +35.8 |
| Labor hold | | | | |

=== Bicton ===
2025 Western Australian state election: Bicton
| Party | Candidate | Votes | % | ±% |
|---|---|---|---|---|
| Labor | Lisa O'Malley | 12,438 | 45.1 | −11.2 |
| Liberal | Chris Dowson | 9,562 | 34.7 | +4.6 |
| Greens | Adam Bennett | 3,982 | 14.5 | +5.3 |
| One Nation | Tim Smith | 868 | 3.2 | +1.8 |
| National | Bill Koul | 704 | 2.6 | +2.6 |
| Total formal votes | | 27,554 | 96.8 | −0.6 |
| Informal votes | | 924 | 3.2 | +0.6 |
| Turnout | | 28,478 | 89.3 | +2.3 |
Two-party-preferred result
| Labor | Lisa O'Malley | 16,346 | 59.3 | −6.8 |
| Liberal | Chris Dowson | 11,200 | 40.7 | +6.8 |
| Labor hold | | Swing | −6.8 | |

=== Bunbury ===
2025 Western Australian state election: Bunbury
| Party | Candidate | Votes | % | ±% |
|---|---|---|---|---|
| Labor | Don Punch | 10,669 | 40.9 | −19.6 |
| Liberal | Heather Reid | 7,223 | 27.7 | +8.8 |
| Greens | Patricia Perks | 2,530 | 9.7 | +4.9 |
| Legalise Cannabis | John Bell | 1,631 | 6.2 | +3.9 |
| One Nation | Shane Myles | 1,556 | 6.0 | +3.3 |
| National | Codee-Lee Down | 1,425 | 5.5 | +1.0 |
| Christians | Boyd Davey | 721 | 2.8 | +2.8 |
| Shooters, Fishers, Farmers | Cameron Van Veen | 351 | 1.3 | −1.2 |
| Total formal votes | | 26,106 | 94.8 | −0.6 |
| Informal votes | | 1,425 | 5.2 | +0.6 |
| Turnout | | 27,531 | 83.8 | +3.4 |
Two-party-preferred result
| Labor | Don Punch | 14,901 | 57.1 | −15.4 |
| Liberal | Heather Reid | 11,178 | 42.9 | +15.4 |
| Labor hold | | Swing | −15.4 | |

=== Butler ===
2025 Western Australian state election: Butler
| Party | Candidate | Votes | % | ±% |
|---|---|---|---|---|
| Labor | Lorna Clarke | 12,605 | 47.2 | −30.0 |
| Liberal | Rikki Baulch | 6,007 | 22.5 | +8.9 |
| Greens | Matthew Price | 2,851 | 10.7 | +6.6 |
| One Nation | Mark Powley | 2,088 | 7.8 | +7.8 |
| Legalise Cannabis | Ramon Granados | 2,025 | 7.6 | +7.6 |
| Christians | Vanessa Montgomery | 1,151 | 4.3 | +2.2 |
| Total formal votes | | 26,727 | 94.8 | −1.5 |
| Informal votes | | 1,470 | 5.2 | +1.5 |
| Turnout | | 28,197 | 79.0 | +7.0 |
Two-party-preferred result
| Labor | Lorna Clarke | 17,276 | 64.7 | −17.9 |
| Liberal | Rikki Baulch | 9,433 | 35.3 | +17.9 |
| Labor hold | | Swing | −17.9 | |

=== Cannington ===
2025 Western Australian state election: Cannington
| Party | Candidate | Votes | % | ±% |
|---|---|---|---|---|
| Labor | Ron Sao | 13,178 | 54.2 | −17.7 |
| Liberal | Bruce Henderson | 5,882 | 24.2 | +11.3 |
| Greens | Eric Hayward | 3,730 | 15.4 | +8.9 |
| Christians | Mark Staer | 1,507 | 6.2 | +1.9 |
| Total formal votes | | 24,297 | 94.3 | −1.7 |
| Informal votes | | 1,465 | 5.7 | +1.7 |
| Turnout | | 25,762 | 82.3 | +2.4 |
Two-party-preferred result
| Labor | Ron Sao | 16,490 | 67.9 | −12.8 |
| Liberal | Bruce Henderson | 7,798 | 32.1 | +12.8 |
| Labor hold | | Swing | −12.8 | |

=== Carine ===
2025 Western Australian state election: Carine
| Party | Candidate | Votes | % | ±% |
|---|---|---|---|---|
| Liberal | Liam Staltari | 15,027 | 52.1 | +9.1 |
| Labor | Paul Lilburne | 9,096 | 31.5 | −14.5 |
| Greens | Lisa Hindmarsh | 3,805 | 13.2 | +5.0 |
| Christians | Sallyann Bone | 927 | 3.2 | +3.2 |
| Total formal votes | | 28,855 | 97.0 | −0.1 |
| Informal votes | | 892 | 3.0 | +0.1 |
| Turnout | | 29,747 | 91.2 | +1.6 |
Two-party-preferred result
| Liberal | Liam Staltari | 16,608 | 57.6 | +11.4 |
| Labor | Paul Lilburne | 12,244 | 42.4 | −11.4 |
| Liberal gain from Labor | | Swing | +11.4 | |

=== Central Wheatbelt ===
2025 Western Australian state election: Central Wheatbelt
| Party | Candidate | Votes | % | ±% |
|---|---|---|---|---|
| National | Lachlan Hunter | 12,417 | 46.7 | +1.3 |
| Labor | Rebecca Atkinson | 5,314 | 20.0 | −14.8 |
| Liberal | Lance French | 3,928 | 14.8 | +5.8 |
| One Nation | Peter Lines | 2,475 | 9.3 | +7.3 |
| Greens | Peter Stephen Leam | 1,447 | 5.4 | +3.2 |
| Christians | Les Holten | 1,030 | 3.9 | +2.2 |
| Total formal votes | | 26,611 | 96.5 | +0.6 |
| Informal votes | | 976 | 3.5 | −0.6 |
| Turnout | | 27,587 | 85.8 | +4.1 |
Two-candidate-preferred result
| National | Lachlan Hunter | 19,490 | 73.3 | +14.1 |
| Labor | Rebecca Atkinson | 7,096 | 26.7 | −14.1 |
| National hold | | Swing | +14.1 | |

=== Churchlands ===
2025 Western Australian state election: Churchlands
| Party | Candidate | Votes | % | ±% |
|---|---|---|---|---|
| Liberal | Basil Zempilas | 12,199 | 43.7 | +0.5 |
| Labor | Christine Tonkin | 8,049 | 28.8 | −11.4 |
| Independent | Lisa Thornton | 3,912 | 14.0 | +14.0 |
| Greens | Caroline McLean | 2,838 | 10.2 | −0.2 |
| Christians | James Rai | 477 | 1.7 | +0.2 |
| Independent | Anthony Fels | 268 | 1.0 | +1.0 |
| Fusion | Tian Carrie-Wilson | 169 | 0.6 | +0.6 |
| Total formal votes | | 27,912 | 97.1 | −0.3 |
| Informal votes | | 823 | 2.9 | +0.3 |
| Turnout | | 28,735 | 90.2 | +3.5 |
Two-party-preferred result
| Liberal | Basil Zempilas | 14,271 | 51.1 | +2.7 |
| Labor | Christine Tonkin | 13,635 | 48.9 | −2.7 |
| Liberal gain from Labor | | Swing | +2.7 | |

=== Cockburn ===
2025 Western Australian state election: Cockburn
| Party | Candidate | Votes | % | ±% |
|---|---|---|---|---|
| Labor | David Scaife | 14,219 | 52.2 | −17.7 |
| Liberal | Brunetta Di Russo | 6,750 | 24.8 | +7.2 |
| Greens | Brendan Graham Sturcke | 3,282 | 12.0 | +5.9 |
| Legalise Cannabis | Christopher Rennick | 1,577 | 5.8 | +5.8 |
| Christians | Gopi Veloo | 1,424 | 5.2 | +5.2 |
| Total formal votes | | 27,252 | 95.0 | −1.2 |
| Informal votes | | 1,422 | 5.0 | +1.2 |
| Turnout | | 28,674 | 87.4 | +6.7 |
Two-party-preferred result
| Labor | David Scaife | 18,479 | 67.8 | −10.2 |
| Liberal | Brunetta Di Russo | 8,764 | 32.2 | +10.2 |
| Labor hold | | Swing | −10.2 | |

=== Collie-Preston ===
2025 Western Australian state election: Collie-Preston
| Party | Candidate | Votes | % | ±% |
|---|---|---|---|---|
| Labor | Jodie Hanns | 11,361 | 40.6 | −21.0 |
| Liberal | Matt Sharp | 6,393 | 22.9 | +8.5 |
| National | Cam Parsons | 3,571 | 12.8 | +3.8 |
| One Nation | Jess Adams | 2,076 | 7.4 | +5.4 |
| Greens | Robert Mann | 1,919 | 6.9 | +2.8 |
| Legalise Cannabis | Paul Gullan | 1,142 | 4.1 | +2.3 |
| Shooters, Fishers, Farmers | Joshua Wray Coffey | 764 | 2.7 | −0.2 |
| Christians | Norm Wiese | 736 | 2.6 | +2.6 |
| Total formal votes | | 27,962 | 95.2 | −0.8 |
| Informal votes | | 1,412 | 4.8 | +0.8 |
| Turnout | | 29,374 | 88.6 | +5.2 |
Two-party-preferred result
| Labor | Jodie Hanns | 15,177 | 54.3 | −19.0 |
| Liberal | Matt Sharp | 12,760 | 45.7 | +19.0 |
| Labor hold | | Swing | −19.0 | |

=== Cottesloe ===
2025 Western Australian state election: Cottesloe
| Party | Candidate | Votes | % | ±% |
|---|---|---|---|---|
| Liberal | Sandra Brewer | 14,612 | 50.7 | +3.8 |
| Independent | Rachel Horncastle | 7,771 | 26.9 | +26.9 |
| Labor | Amy Astill | 3,445 | 11.9 | −16.4 |
| Greens | Heidi Hardisty | 2,376 | 8.2 | −4.4 |
| Legalise Cannabis | Jessica Yu | 636 | 2.2 | +2.2 |
| Total formal votes | | 28,840 | 97.8 | +0.4 |
| Informal votes | | 657 | 2.2 | −0.4 |
| Turnout | | 29,497 | 89.0 | +3.2 |
Two-candidate-preferred result
| Liberal | Sandra Brewer | 16,019 | 55.6 | −1.9 |
| Independent | Rachel Horncastle | 12,817 | 44.4 | +44.4 |
| Liberal hold | | | | |

=== Darling Range ===
2025 Western Australian state election: Darling Range
| Party | Candidate | Votes | % | ±% |
|---|---|---|---|---|
| Labor | Hugh Jones | 10,983 | 40.9 | −16.0 |
| Liberal | Paul Mansfield | 6,462 | 24.1 | −3.5 |
| One Nation | Liam John Heerema | 2,174 | 8.1 | +6.0 |
| Greens | Dominic Firmager | 2,151 | 8.0 | +3.6 |
| Christians | Quintin Kleyn | 1,540 | 5.7 | +1.1 |
| National | Morgan Byas | 1,522 | 5.7 | +5.7 |
| Legalise Cannabis | Robert Peters | 1,331 | 5.0 | +5.0 |
| Shooters, Fishers, Farmers | Ian Blevin | 665 | 2.5 | +2.5 |
| Total formal votes | | 26,828 | 95.3 | −1.1 |
| Informal votes | | 1,309 | 4.7 | +1.1 |
| Turnout | | 28,137 | 87.3 | +5.8 |
Two-party-preferred result
| Labor | Hugh Jones | 14,765 | 55.1 | −9.0 |
| Liberal | Paul Mansfield | 12,046 | 44.9 | +9.0 |
| Labor hold | | Swing | −9.0 | |

=== Dawesville ===
2025 Western Australian state election: Dawesville
| Party | Candidate | Votes | % | ±% |
|---|---|---|---|---|
| Labor | Lisa Munday | 10,900 | 41.6 | −15.4 |
| Liberal | Owen Mulder | 10,151 | 38.7 | +6.0 |
| One Nation | Wayne Fuller | 1,826 | 7.0 | +5.4 |
| Greens | Susanne Godden | 1,699 | 6.5 | +3.3 |
| Legalise Cannabis | Sharlene Mavor | 788 | 3.0 | +1.7 |
| Christians | Kerry Stewart | 417 | 1.6 | +1.6 |
| Shooters, Fishers, Farmers | Sam Walker | 416 | 1.6 | +0.1 |
| Total formal votes | | 26,197 | 96.3 | +0.0 |
| Informal votes | | 1,014 | 3.7 | −0.0 |
| Turnout | | 27,211 | 86.4 | +6.0 |
Two-party-preferred result
| Labor | Lisa Munday | 13,430 | 51.3 | −11.9 |
| Liberal | Owen Mulder | 12,761 | 48.7 | +11.9 |
| Labor hold | | Swing | −11.9 | |

=== Forrestfield ===
2025 Western Australian state election: Forrestfield
| Party | Candidate | Votes | % | ±% |
|---|---|---|---|---|
| Labor | Stephen Price | 11,241 | 41.3 | −24.3 |
| Liberal | George Tilbury | 8,894 | 32.7 | +10.9 |
| Greens | River Clarke | 2,496 | 9.2 | +4.2 |
| One Nation | Peter Nicholls | 1,283 | 4.7 | +2.6 |
| National | Ian Blayney | 1,078 | 4.0 | +4.0 |
| Legalise Cannabis | Steve Emmons | 969 | 3.6 | +3.6 |
| Christians | Jacob Morrow | 839 | 3.1 | +0.5 |
| Shooters, Fishers, Farmers | Chris D. Munro | 407 | 1.5 | +1.5 |
| Total formal votes | | 27,207 | 95.5 | −0.7 |
| Informal votes | | 1,286 | 4.5 | +0.7 |
| Turnout | | 28,493 | 86.5 | +2.2 |
Two-party-preferred result
| Labor | Stephen Price | 14,707 | 54.1 | −18.8 |
| Liberal | George Tilbury | 12,479 | 45.9 | +18.8 |
| Labor hold | | Swing | −18.8 | |

=== Fremantle ===
2025 Western Australian state election: Fremantle
| Party | Candidate | Votes | % | ±% |
|---|---|---|---|---|
| Labor | Simone McGurk | 8,418 | 33.6 | −21.8 |
| Independent | Kate Hulett | 6,411 | 25.6 | +25.6 |
| Liberal | Serena Kipling | 4,709 | 18.8 | +2.5 |
| Greens | Felicity Townsend | 3,983 | 15.9 | −4.4 |
| Legalise Cannabis | Dave Foley | 596 | 2.4 | +2.4 |
| Animal Justice | Natashia Boland | 399 | 1.6 | +1.6 |
| Christians | Peter Watt | 344 | 1.4 | +1.4 |
| Shooters, Fishers, Farmers | Nicoletta Raffaelli | 217 | 0.9 | +0.9 |
| Total formal votes | | 25,077 | 96.6 | −0.3 |
| Informal votes | | 887 | 3.4 | +0.3 |
| Turnout | | 25,964 | 84.7 | +6.2 |
Two-candidate-preferred result
| Labor | Simone McGurk | 12,734 | 50.8 | −13.0 |
| Independent | Kate Hulett | 12,310 | 49.2 | +49.2 |
| Labor hold | | | | |

=== Geraldton ===
2025 Western Australian state election: Geraldton
| Party | Candidate | Votes | % | ±% |
|---|---|---|---|---|
| National | Kirrilee Warr | 7,452 | 28.4 | +1.8 |
| Labor | Lara Dalton | 6,390 | 24.3 | −28.0 |
| Independent | Shane van Styn | 5,339 | 20.3 | +20.3 |
| Liberal | Tim Milnes | 4,212 | 16.0 | +3.3 |
| Greens | Madeline Doncon | 994 | 3.8 | +1.2 |
| Legalise Cannabis | David Van Beek | 594 | 2.3 | +2.3 |
| Christians | Eugenie Harris | 571 | 2.2 | +2.2 |
| Independent | Aaron Horsman | 468 | 1.8 | +1.8 |
| Shooters, Fishers, Farmers | Jack Ostle | 241 | 0.9 | −1.1 |
| Total formal votes | | 26,261 | 96.0 | −0.5 |
| Informal votes | | 1,090 | 4.0 | +0.5 |
| Turnout | | 27,351 | 82.9 | +3.7 |
Two-candidate-preferred result
| National | Kirrilee Warr | 16,812 | 64.1 | +64.1 |
| Labor | Lara Dalton | 9,414 | 35.9 | −23.4 |
| National gain from Labor | | | | |

=== Girrawheen ===
2025 Western Australian state election: Girrawheen
| Party | Candidate | Votes | % | ±% |
|---|---|---|---|---|
| Labor | Meredith Hammat | 12,915 | 52.2 | −20.2 |
| Liberal | Jacques Lombard | 4,458 | 18.0 | +7.7 |
| Greens | Evan Beasley | 2,940 | 11.9 | +6.2 |
| Legalise Cannabis | Nathan Kirk | 2,229 | 9.0 | +9.0 |
| Christians | Tracey Purser | 1,346 | 5.4 | +2.5 |
| Independent | Kim Mubarak | 873 | 3.5 | +2.7 |
| Total formal votes | | 24,761 | 92.8 | −0.4 |
| Informal votes | | 1,935 | 7.2 | +0.4 |
| Turnout | | 26,696 | 82.8 | +3.6 |
Two-party-preferred result
| Labor | Meredith Hammat | 17,649 | 71.3 | −12.1 |
| Liberal | Jacques Lombard | 7,090 | 28.7 | +12.1 |
| Labor hold | | Swing | −12.1 | |

=== Hillarys ===
2025 Western Australian state election: Hillarys
| Party | Candidate | Votes | % | ±% |
|---|---|---|---|---|
| Labor | Caitlin Collins | 15,021 | 52.5 | −8.7 |
| Liberal | Lisa Olsson | 9,825 | 34.3 | +7.4 |
| Greens | Nicholas D'Alonzo | 2,733 | 9.6 | +4.4 |
| Christians | Dwight Randall | 1,026 | 3.6 | +3.4 |
| Total formal votes | | 28,605 | 96.7 | −0.2 |
| Informal votes | | 977 | 3.3 | +0.2 |
| Turnout | | 29,582 | 89.0 | +3.2 |
Two-party-preferred result
| Labor | Caitlin Collins | 17,201 | 60.1 | −8.6 |
| Liberal | Lisa Olsson | 11,401 | 39.9 | +8.6 |
| Labor hold | | Swing | −8.6 | |

=== Jandakot ===
2025 Western Australian state election: Jandakot
| Party | Candidate | Votes | % | ±% |
|---|---|---|---|---|
| Labor | Stephen Pratt | 12,006 | 45.1 | −16.0 |
| Liberal | Nicole Robins | 9,152 | 34.3 | +8.1 |
| Greens | Ariana Carot Collins | 2,891 | 10.9 | +5.2 |
| One Nation | Igor Mironenko | 1,139 | 4.3 | +2.9 |
| Christians | Marianne Pretorius | 1,087 | 4.1 | +1.7 |
| Shooters, Fishers, Farmers | Alan Brian Strahan | 369 | 1.4 | +1.4 |
| Total formal votes | | 26,644 | 96.3 | −0.7 |
| Informal votes | | 1,034 | 3.7 | +0.7 |
| Turnout | | 27,678 | 90.5 | +6.8 |
Two-party-preferred result
| Labor | Stephen Pratt | 15,028 | 56.4 | −11.7 |
| Liberal | Nicole Robins | 11,608 | 43.6 | +11.7 |
| Labor hold | | Swing | −11.7 | |

=== Joondalup ===
2025 Western Australian state election: Joondalup
| Party | Candidate | Votes | % | ±% |
|---|---|---|---|---|
| Labor | Emily Hamilton | 12,274 | 44.0 | −22.5 |
| Liberal | Michael Dudek | 9,782 | 35.1 | +15.9 |
| Greens | Brian Sova | 2,229 | 8.0 | +3.4 |
| Christians | Trevor Bartley | 927 | 3.3 | +1.0 |
| Legalise Cannabis | Samantha Law | 847 | 3.0 | +1.4 |
| Animal Justice | Neil Jensen | 612 | 2.2 | +2.2 |
| Independent | Nicole Butler | 561 | 2.0 | +2.0 |
| Shooters, Fishers, Farmers | Michael Kannis | 337 | 1.2 | +1.2 |
| Stop Pedophiles | M. Waghorn | 323 | 1.2 | +1.2 |
| Total formal votes | | 27,892 | 95.8 | −0.5 |
| Informal votes | | 1,226 | 4.2 | +0.5 |
| Turnout | | 29,118 | 88.1 | +3.9 |
Two-party-preferred result
| Labor | Emily Hamilton | 15,685 | 56.3 | −19.2 |
| Liberal | Michael Dudek | 12,196 | 43.7 | +19.2 |
| Labor hold | | Swing | −19.2 | |

=== Kalamunda ===
2025 Western Australian state election: Kalamunda
| Party | Candidate | Votes | % | ±% |
|---|---|---|---|---|
| Labor | Karen Beale | 9,120 | 32.2 | −21.9 |
| Liberal | Adam Hort | 8,874 | 31.4 | +2.2 |
| Greens | Janelle Sewell | 4,197 | 14.8 | +6.5 |
| National | Lisa Logan | 2,588 | 9.1 | +9.1 |
| One Nation | Robert Critchley | 1,375 | 4.9 | +3.6 |
| Legalise Cannabis | Penelope Young | 991 | 3.5 | +3.5 |
| Christians | Shemma Timney | 715 | 2.5 | −0.2 |
| Shooters, Fishers, Farmers | George Taylor | 438 | 1.5 | +1.5 |
| Total formal votes | | 28,298 | 96.3 | −0.3 |
| Informal votes | | 1,093 | 3.7 | +0.3 |
| Turnout | | 29,391 | 89.4 | −1.3 |
Two-party-preferred result
| Liberal | Adam Hort | 14,178 | 50.1 | +14.7 |
| Labor | Karen Beale | 14,096 | 49.9 | −14.7 |
| Liberal gain from Labor | | Swing | +14.7 | |

=== Kalgoorlie ===
2025 Western Australian state election: Kalgoorlie
| Party | Candidate | Votes | % | ±% |
|---|---|---|---|---|
| Labor | Ali Kent | 5,110 | 34.4 | −17.6 |
| Liberal | Rowena Olsen | 3,081 | 20.7 | −3.9 |
| National | Tony Herron | 2,277 | 15.3 | +3.4 |
| Independent | Kyran O'Donnell | 1,931 | 13.0 | +13.0 |
| Legalise Cannabis | Kelly Malcolm | 706 | 4.7 | +4.7 |
| One Nation | Jordan Whitten | 684 | 4.6 | +1.0 |
| Greens | Donald Shane Clarke | 580 | 3.9 | +1.7 |
| Christians | Ross G. Patterson | 307 | 2.1 | +2.1 |
| Shooters, Fishers, Farmers | Stefan Colagiuri | 199 | 1.3 | −1.8 |
| Total formal votes | | 14,875 | 95.0 | −1.1 |
| Informal votes | | 787 | 5.0 | +1.1 |
| Turnout | | 15,662 | 71.9 | −3.0 |
Two-party-preferred result
| Labor | Ali Kent | 7,655 | 51.6 | −9.6 |
| Liberal | Rowena Olsen | 7,188 | 48.4 | +9.6 |
| Labor hold | | Swing | −9.6 | |

=== Kimberley ===
2025 Western Australian state election: Kimberley
| Party | Candidate | Votes | % | ±% |
|---|---|---|---|---|
| Labor | Divina D'Anna | 4,574 | 43.4 | −10.5 |
| Liberal | Darren Spackman | 2,351 | 22.3 | +1.8 |
| Greens | Jaala Edith Ozies | 1,848 | 17.5 | +2.5 |
| National | Millie Hills | 1,169 | 11.1 | +4.9 |
| Christians | Zoe Golding | 605 | 5.7 | +5.7 |
| Total formal votes | | 10,547 | 96.5 | +0.2 |
| Informal votes | | 386 | 3.5 | −0.2 |
| Turnout | | 10,933 | 59.3 | −7.6 |
Two-party-preferred result
| Labor | Divina D'Anna | 6,751 | 64.0 | −7.4 |
| Liberal | Darren Spackman | 3,791 | 36.0 | +7.4 |
| Labor hold | | Swing | −7.4 | |

=== Kingsley ===
2025 Western Australian state election: Kingsley
| Party | Candidate | Votes | % | ±% |
|---|---|---|---|---|
| Labor | Jessica Stojkovski | 11,714 | 42.3 | −18.2 |
| Liberal | Scott Edwardes | 10,420 | 37.6 | +7.4 |
| Greens | Sheridan Young | 3,027 | 10.9 | +5.4 |
| One Nation | Natalie Whitten | 917 | 3.3 | +1.6 |
| Christians | Josephine Bartley | 707 | 2.6 | +2.6 |
| Independent | Martyn Shipton | 635 | 2.3 | +2.3 |
| Shooters, Fishers, Farmers | Adam Johnson | 280 | 1.0 | +1.0 |
| Total formal votes | | 27,700 | 96.3 | −0.5 |
| Informal votes | | 1,079 | 3.7 | +0.5 |
| Turnout | | 28,779 | 91.0 | +3.0 |
Two-party-preferred result
| Labor | Jessica Stojkovski | 14,802 | 53.5 | −13.4 |
| Liberal | Scott Edwardes | 12,888 | 46.5 | +13.4 |
| Labor hold | | Swing | −13.4 | |

=== Kwinana ===
2025 Western Australian state election: Kwinana
| Party | Candidate | Votes | % | ±% |
|---|---|---|---|---|
| Labor | Roger Cook | 15,269 | 58.7 | −20.5 |
| Liberal | Cameron Foord | 3,205 | 12.3 | +4.8 |
| Greens | Jody Freeman | 2,546 | 9.8 | +4.3 |
| One Nation | Andrej Pajewski | 1,459 | 5.6 | +2.9 |
| Legalise Cannabis | Paul Mavor | 1,057 | 4.1 | +4.1 |
| Independent | Paul Howard | 799 | 3.1 | +3.1 |
| Christians | Vizia Daniel Devarap | 737 | 2.8 | +2.8 |
| Animal Justice | Esther Forest | 480 | 1.8 | +1.8 |
| Shooters, Fishers, Farmers | Tim Hamilton | 450 | 1.7 | +1.7 |
| Total formal votes | | 26,002 | 94.1 | −2.0 |
| Informal votes | | 1,626 | 5.9 | +2.0 |
| Turnout | | 27,628 | 82.1 | +7.1 |
Two-party-preferred result
| Labor | Roger Cook | 19,486 | 75.0 | −13.2 |
| Liberal | Cameron Foord | 6,496 | 25.0 | +13.2 |
| Labor hold | | Swing | −13.2 | |

=== Landsdale ===
2025 Western Australian state election: Landsdale
| Party | Candidate | Votes | % | ±% |
|---|---|---|---|---|
| Labor | Daniel Pastorelli | 13,756 | 49.8 | −19.2 |
| Liberal | Marizane Moore | 8,775 | 31.8 | +11.8 |
| Greens | Michaela King | 2,417 | 8.8 | +4.5 |
| Christians | Candice Parsons | 1,398 | 5.1 | +4.8 |
| Independent | Ziggi Murphy | 1,268 | 4.6 | +4.6 |
| Total formal votes | | 27,614 | 95.1 | −0.5 |
| Informal votes | | 1,428 | 4.9 | +0.5 |
| Turnout | | 29,042 | 89.9 | +6.8 |
Two-party-preferred result
| Labor | Daniel Pastorelli | 16,444 | 59.6 | −16.0 |
| Liberal | Marizane Moore | 11,163 | 40.4 | +16.0 |
| Labor hold | | Swing | −16.0 | |

=== Mandurah ===
2025 Western Australian state election: Mandurah
| Party | Candidate | Votes | % | ±% |
|---|---|---|---|---|
| Labor | Rhys Williams | 11,930 | 46.9 | −20.7 |
| Liberal | Kaye Seeber | 7,508 | 29.5 | +8.7 |
| One Nation | Nicholas Gemmell | 2,249 | 8.8 | +7.2 |
| Greens | Chance Riley Bruening | 2,186 | 8.6 | +5.5 |
| Stop Pedophiles | C. Hill | 1,025 | 4.0 | +4.0 |
| Christians | Lenka Pesch | 552 | 2.2 | +2.2 |
| Total formal votes | | 25,450 | 94.7 | −0.2 |
| Informal votes | | 1,413 | 5.3 | +0.2 |
| Turnout | | 26,863 | 81.9 | +7.3 |
Two-party-preferred result
| Labor | Rhys Williams | 15,144 | 59.5 | −14.7 |
| Liberal | Kaye Seeber | 10,294 | 40.5 | +14.7 |
| Labor hold | | Swing | −14.7 | |

=== Maylands ===
2025 Western Australian state election: Maylands
| Party | Candidate | Votes | % | ±% |
|---|---|---|---|---|
| Labor | Dan Bull | 13,471 | 50.8 | −11.3 |
| Greens | Caroline Marisa Perks | 6,056 | 22.8 | +6.7 |
| Liberal | Paula Tan | 5,743 | 21.7 | +6.1 |
| Christians | Gaye Burnett | 720 | 2.7 | +0.9 |
| Libertarian | Peter Cornish | 534 | 2.0 | +2.0 |
| Total formal votes | | 26,524 | 96.3 | −0.2 |
| Informal votes | | 1,033 | 3.7 | +0.2 |
| Turnout | | 27,557 | 86.5 | +3.5 |
Two-party-preferred result
| Labor | Dan Bull | 19,214 | 72.5 | −6.9 |
| Liberal | Paula Tan | 7,305 | 27.5 | +6.9 |
| Labor hold | | Swing | −6.9 | |

=== Midland ===
2025 Western Australian state election: Midland
| Party | Candidate | Votes | % | ±% |
|---|---|---|---|---|
| Labor | Steve Catania | 10,514 | 40.4 | −26.6 |
| Liberal | Mike Matich | 6,942 | 26.7 | +8.7 |
| Greens | Sarah Nielsen-Harvey | 2,616 | 10.1 | +3.5 |
| Independent | Sarah Howlett | 1,895 | 7.3 | +7.3 |
| One Nation | Julie Anne Cottam | 1,529 | 5.9 | +3.7 |
| Legalise Cannabis | Jane-Marie Southworth | 1,287 | 4.9 | +4.9 |
| Christians | Brian Warburton | 657 | 2.5 | −0.2 |
| Animal Justice | Delia Richardson | 562 | 2.2 | +2.2 |
| Total formal votes | | 26,002 | 95.1 | −0.5 |
| Informal votes | | 1,350 | 4.9 | +0.5 |
| Turnout | | 27,352 | 83.4 | +5.7 |
Two-party-preferred result
| Labor | Steve Catania | 15,818 | 60.9 | −16.0 |
| Liberal | Mike Matich | 10,155 | 39.1 | +16.0 |
| Labor hold | | Swing | −16.0 | |

=== Mid-West ===
2025 Western Australian state election: Mid-West
| Party | Candidate | Votes | % | ±% |
|---|---|---|---|---|
| National | Shane Love | 8,464 | 42.9 | +4.2 |
| Liberal | Merome Beard | 4,563 | 23.1 | +6.6 |
| Labor | Jenna Denton | 3,362 | 17.1 | −16.7 |
| One Nation | Mark Douglas Burns | 1,218 | 6.2 | +3.6 |
| Greens | Chilla Bulbeck | 845 | 4.3 | +1.6 |
| Legalise Cannabis | Shannon Yeh | 650 | 3.3 | +3.3 |
| Christians | Mike Reymond | 401 | 2.0 | +2.0 |
| Libertarian | Chrystal Sclater | 214 | 1.1 | +1.1 |
| Total formal votes | | 19,717 | 95.8 | −0.3 |
| Informal votes | | 864 | 4.2 | +0.3 |
| Turnout | | 20,581 | 84.4 | +1.6 |
Two-candidate-preferred result
| National | Shane Love | 12,551 | 63.7 | +5.1 |
| Liberal | Merome Beard | 7,140 | 36.3 | +36.3 |
| National hold | | | | |

=== Mindarie ===
2025 Western Australian state election: Mindarie
| Party | Candidate | Votes | % | ±% |
|---|---|---|---|---|
| Labor | Mark Folkard | 11,454 | 44.7 | −26.6 |
| Liberal | Paul Miles | 6,606 | 25.8 | +8.2 |
| Greens | Scott McCarthy | 2,418 | 9.4 | +3.9 |
| One Nation | John Burton | 1,798 | 7.0 | +7.0 |
| Legalise Cannabis | Lee Hunt | 1,325 | 5.2 | +5.2 |
| Animal Justice | Penelope Hall | 913 | 3.6 | +3.6 |
| Christians | Patrick Thomas | 820 | 3.2 | +0.8 |
| Shooters, Fishers, Farmers | Christian Mellon | 306 | 1.2 | +1.2 |
| Total formal votes | | 25,640 | 95.3 | −1.0 |
| Informal votes | | 1,277 | 4.7 | +1.0 |
| Turnout | | 26,917 | 83.7 | +3.1 |
Two-party-preferred result
| Labor | Mark Folkard | 15,710 | 61.3 | −16.6 |
| Liberal | Paul Miles | 9,910 | 38.7 | +16.6 |
| Labor hold | | Swing | −16.6 | |

=== Morley ===
2025 Western Australian state election: Morley
| Party | Candidate | Votes | % | ±% |
|---|---|---|---|---|
| Labor | Amber-Jade Sanderson | 12,918 | 50.7 | −18.6 |
| Liberal | Aswath Chavittupara | 7,479 | 29.4 | +12.7 |
| Greens | Kaelin Charles Abrahams | 2,888 | 11.3 | +5.0 |
| One Nation | Conor Doyle | 1,179 | 4.6 | +2.6 |
| Christians | Giulio G. Di Somma | 660 | 2.6 | −0.5 |
| Shooters, Fishers, Farmers | Cameron Yates | 351 | 1.4 | +1.4 |
| Total formal votes | | 25,475 | 94.7 | −0.6 |
| Informal votes | | 1,439 | 5.3 | +0.6 |
| Turnout | | 26,914 | 87.1 | +2.5 |
Two-party-preferred result
| Labor | Amber-Jade Sanderson | 15,795 | 62.0 | −15.8 |
| Liberal | Aswath Chavittupara | 9,671 | 38.0 | +15.8 |
| Labor hold | | Swing | −15.8 | |

=== Mount Lawley ===
2025 Western Australian state election: Mount Lawley
| Party | Candidate | Votes | % | ±% |
|---|---|---|---|---|
| Labor | Frank Paolino | 11,516 | 42.7 | −16.5 |
| Liberal | Michelle Sutherland | 8,780 | 32.6 | +9.4 |
| Greens | Lucy Nicol | 4,346 | 16.1 | +4.8 |
| Legalise Cannabis | Leo Treasure | 878 | 3.3 | +3.3 |
| One Nation | Graeme Morrison | 746 | 2.8 | +2.0 |
| Christians | Nathaly Key-Elliss | 494 | 1.8 | +0.2 |
| Shooters, Fishers, Farmers | S. L. Singleton | 204 | 0.8 | +0.8 |
| Total formal votes | | 26,964 | 96.4 | −0.1 |
| Informal votes | | 1,000 | 3.6 | +0.1 |
| Turnout | | 27,964 | 88.3 | +3.6 |
Two-party-preferred result
| Labor | Frank Paolino | 16,352 | 60.7 | −11.2 |
| Liberal | Michelle Sutherland | 10,607 | 39.3 | +11.2 |
| Labor hold | | Swing | −11.2 | |

=== Murray-Wellington ===
2025 Western Australian state election: Murray-Wellington
| Party | Candidate | Votes | % | ±% |
|---|---|---|---|---|
| Labor | Robyn Clarke | 9,777 | 34.8 | −23.1 |
| Liberal | David Bolt | 9,518 | 33.9 | +9.6 |
| One Nation | Lucas Zwikielberg | 2,388 | 8.5 | +6.4 |
| National | Paul Gillett | 1,995 | 7.1 | +4.0 |
| Greens | Vince Puccio | 1,774 | 6.3 | +3.5 |
| Legalise Cannabis | Mark Schneider | 1,249 | 4.4 | +1.6 |
| Shooters, Fishers, Farmers | Joe Gurak | 865 | 3.1 | −1.5 |
| Christians | Deonne Kingsford | 552 | 2.0 | +2.0 |
| Total formal votes | | 28,118 | 95.2 | +0.1 |
| Informal votes | | 1,407 | 4.8 | −0.1 |
| Turnout | | 29,525 | 86.8 | +4.4 |
Two-party-preferred result
| Liberal | David Bolt | 14,520 | 51.7 | +18.9 |
| Labor | Robyn Clarke | 13,581 | 48.3 | −18.9 |
| Liberal gain from Labor | | Swing | +18.9 | |

=== Nedlands ===
2025 Western Australian state election: Nedlands
| Party | Candidate | Votes | % | ±% |
|---|---|---|---|---|
| Liberal | Jonathan Huston | 12,533 | 44.5 | +9.6 |
| Labor | Mary Monkhouse | 6,977 | 24.8 | −11.2 |
| Greens | Viv Glance | 4,065 | 14.4 | +0.8 |
| Independent | Rosemarie de Vries | 2,524 | 9.0 | +9.0 |
| Independent | Cilla de Lacy | 908 | 3.2 | +3.2 |
| One Nation | Alex Ironside | 429 | 1.5 | +1.5 |
| Christians | Laura Yow | 427 | 1.5 | +1.5 |
| Independent | Jonathan Hippisley | 181 | 0.6 | +0.6 |
| Independent | Peter D. Dunne | 129 | 0.5 | +0.5 |
| Total formal votes | | 28,173 | 97.4 | −0.2 |
| Informal votes | | 752 | 2.6 | +0.2 |
| Turnout | | 28,925 | 88.5 | +4.1 |
Two-party-preferred result
| Liberal | Jonathan Huston | 14,845 | 52.7 | +5.8 |
| Labor | Mary Monkhouse | 13,314 | 47.3 | −5.8 |
| Liberal gain from Labor | | Swing | +5.8 | |

=== Oakford ===
2025 Western Australian state election: Oakford
| Party | Candidate | Votes | % | ±% |
|---|---|---|---|---|
| Labor | Yaz Mubarakai | 12,794 | 45.5 | −24.8 |
| Liberal | Tait Marston | 6,715 | 23.9 | +7.0 |
| Greens | Heather Lonsdale | 2,792 | 9.9 | +5.5 |
| Christians | Jiby Joy | 1,973 | 7.0 | +4.1 |
| One Nation | Mandy Dhandli | 1,825 | 6.5 | +4.5 |
| Legalise Cannabis | Srdjan Lazarevic | 877 | 3.1 | +3.1 |
| Shooters, Fishers, Farmers | Ronald Lean | 587 | 2.1 | +2.1 |
| Independent | Lawrence Levett | 528 | 1.9 | +1.9 |
| Total formal votes | | 28,091 | 95.2 | −1.1 |
| Informal votes | | 1,407 | 4.8 | +1.1 |
| Turnout | | 29,498 | 87.8 | +6.5 |
Two-party-preferred result
| Labor | Yaz Mubarakai | 17,381 | 61.9 | −15.8 |
| Liberal | Tait Marston | 10,696 | 38.1 | +15.8 |
| Labor hold | | Swing | −15.8 | |

=== Perth ===
2025 Western Australian state election: Perth
| Party | Candidate | Votes | % | ±% |
|---|---|---|---|---|
| Labor | John Carey | 12,592 | 48.9 | −14.5 |
| Liberal | Sean Butler | 6,520 | 25.3 | +7.4 |
| Greens | Simone Springer | 5,710 | 22.2 | +6.2 |
| Animal Justice | Grant Stewart | 925 | 3.6 | +3.6 |
| Total formal votes | | 25,747 | 97.1 | +0.3 |
| Informal votes | | 774 | 2.9 | −0.3 |
| Turnout | | 26,521 | 83.1 | +1.9 |
Two-party-preferred result
| Labor | John Carey | 18,267 | 71.0 | −8.3 |
| Liberal | Sean Butler | 7,477 | 29.0 | +8.3 |
| Labor hold | | Swing | −8.3 | |

=== Pilbara ===
2025 Western Australian state election: Pilbara
| Party | Candidate | Votes | % | ±% |
|---|---|---|---|---|
| Labor | Kevin Michel | 6,582 | 36.1 | −22.1 |
| Liberal | Amanda Kailis | 4,382 | 24.0 | +15.7 |
| National | Kieran Dart | 2,983 | 16.4 | −4.5 |
| One Nation | Brenton Johannsen | 1,594 | 8.7 | +5.8 |
| Greens | Niels Glahn-Bertelsen | 1,299 | 7.1 | +3.4 |
| Legalise Cannabis | Georgina Wilkinson | 817 | 4.5 | +4.5 |
| Shooters, Fishers, Farmers | Leanne Lockyer | 584 | 3.2 | +0.1 |
| Total formal votes | | 18,241 | 94.8 | −0.5 |
| Informal votes | | 995 | 5.2 | +0.5 |
| Turnout | | 19,236 | 64.7 | −4.2 |
Two-party-preferred result
| Labor | Kevin Michel | 9,218 | 50.6 | −17.1 |
| Liberal | Amanda Kailis | 9,011 | 49.4 | +49.4 |
| Labor hold | | | | |

=== Riverton ===
2025 Western Australian state election: Riverton
| Party | Candidate | Votes | % | ±% |
|---|---|---|---|---|
| Labor | Jags Krishnan | 12,005 | 43.2 | −8.9 |
| Liberal | Amanda Spencer-Teo | 10,121 | 36.4 | +3.7 |
| Greens | Tim Hall | 3,224 | 11.6 | +4.2 |
| Christians | Joan Lee Ng | 1,551 | 5.6 | +1.7 |
| One Nation | Flint Adarne | 893 | 3.2 | +3.0 |
| Total formal votes | | 27,794 | 96.9 | −0.5 |
| Informal votes | | 891 | 3.1 | +0.5 |
| Turnout | | 28,685 | 91.8 | +4.2 |
Two-party-preferred result
| Labor | Jags Krishnan | 15,064 | 54.2 | −6.6 |
| Liberal | Amanda Spencer-Teo | 12,714 | 45.8 | +6.6 |
| Labor hold | | Swing | −6.6 | |

=== Rockingham ===
2025 Western Australian state election: Rockingham
| Party | Candidate | Votes | % | ±% |
|---|---|---|---|---|
| Labor | Magenta Marshall | 11,581 | 46.5 | −36.2 |
| Liberal | Hayley Edwards | 6,660 | 26.8 | +17.0 |
| Greens | Robert Delves | 1,981 | 8.0 | +4.8 |
| One Nation | Cristina Oregioni | 1,551 | 6.2 | +4.2 |
| Legalise Cannabis | Phillip Leslie | 1,215 | 4.9 | +4.9 |
| Independent | Jason Keane | 813 | 3.3 | +3.3 |
| Christians | Tim Pearce | 630 | 2.5 | +2.5 |
| Animal Justice | Sarah Gould | 448 | 1.8 | +1.8 |
| Total formal votes | | 24,879 | 95.5 | −1.3 |
| Informal votes | | 1,181 | 4.5 | +1.3 |
| Turnout | | 26,060 | 85.5 | +4.4 |
Two-party-preferred result
| Labor | Magenta Marshall | 15,370 | 61.8 | −25.9 |
| Liberal | Hayley Edwards | 9,495 | 38.2 | +25.9 |
| Labor hold | | Swing | −25.9 | |

=== Roe ===
2025 Western Australian state election: Roe
| Party | Candidate | Votes | % | ±% |
|---|---|---|---|---|
| National | Peter Rundle | 12,502 | 53.3 | +10.2 |
| Liberal | Marie O'Dea | 4,047 | 17.3 | +2.9 |
| Labor | Brad Willis | 3,014 | 12.9 | −15.8 |
| One Nation | Ethann Sinclair | 1,985 | 8.5 | +6.7 |
| Greens | David John Worth | 1,306 | 5.6 | +1.9 |
| Christians | Diana Reymond | 596 | 2.5 | +0.2 |
| Total formal votes | | 23,450 | 96.3 | +0.2 |
| Informal votes | | 895 | 3.7 | −0.2 |
| Turnout | | 24,345 | 86.0 | +1.4 |
Two-candidate-preferred result
| National | Peter Rundle | 17,598 | 75.1 | +12.9 |
| Liberal | Marie O'Dea | 5,846 | 24.9 | +24.9 |
| National hold | | | | |

=== Scarborough ===
2025 Western Australian state election: Scarborough
| Party | Candidate | Votes | % | ±% |
|---|---|---|---|---|
| Labor | Stuart Aubrey | 11,019 | 41.6 | −7.5 |
| Liberal | Damien Kelly | 10,199 | 38.5 | +2.9 |
| Greens | Mark Twiss | 3,270 | 12.4 | +2.6 |
| National | Elizabeth Re | 1,254 | 4.7 | +4.7 |
| Animal Justice | Emily Stokes | 725 | 2.7 | +2.7 |
| Total formal votes | | 26,467 | 97.0 | −0.1 |
| Informal votes | | 819 | 3.0 | +0.1 |
| Turnout | | 27,286 | 86.0 | +4.2 |
Two-party-preferred result
| Labor | Stuart Aubrey | 14,563 | 55.0 | −4.5 |
| Liberal | Damien Kelly | 11,897 | 45.0 | +4.5 |
| Labor hold | | Swing | −4.5 | |

=== Secret Harbour ===
2025 Western Australian state election: Secret Harbour
| Party | Candidate | Votes | % | ±% |
|---|---|---|---|---|
| Labor | Paul Papalia | 12,876 | 46.5 | −28.5 |
| Liberal | Mark Jones | 6,913 | 25.0 | +9.7 |
| Greens | Tamsyn Heynes | 2,439 | 8.8 | +5.3 |
| One Nation | Liam Hall | 2,332 | 8.4 | +6.3 |
| Legalise Cannabis | Jim Matters | 1,623 | 5.9 | +5.5 |
| Christians | Robert Burdett | 755 | 2.7 | +2.7 |
| Animal Justice | Elizabeth Storer | 723 | 2.6 | +2.6 |
| Total formal votes | | 27,661 | 95.4 | −0.6 |
| Informal votes | | 1,323 | 4.6 | +0.6 |
| Turnout | | 28,984 | 84.5 | +4.0 |
Two-party-preferred result
| Labor | Paul Papalia | 17,011 | 61.5 | −19.8 |
| Liberal | Mark Jones | 10,630 | 38.5 | +19.8 |
| Labor hold | | Swing | −19.8 | |

=== South Perth ===
2025 Western Australian state election: South Perth
| Party | Candidate | Votes | % | ±% |
|---|---|---|---|---|
| Liberal | Bronwyn Waugh | 10,467 | 40.4 | +4.9 |
| Labor | Geoff Baker | 9,497 | 36.6 | −13.3 |
| Greens | Carl Evers | 3,517 | 13.6 | +3.1 |
| National | Jeremy Miles | 1,236 | 4.8 | +4.8 |
| Independent | Andrew Quin | 643 | 2.5 | +2.5 |
| Christians | Rachel Yuan Zhuang | 574 | 2.2 | +2.2 |
| Total formal votes | | 25,934 | 96.9 | −0.1 |
| Informal votes | | 834 | 3.1 | +0.1 |
| Turnout | | 26,768 | 88.0 | +2.3 |
Two-party-preferred result
| Labor | Geoff Baker | 13,375 | 51.6 | −8.5 |
| Liberal | Bronwyn Waugh | 12,551 | 48.4 | +8.5 |
| Labor hold | | Swing | −8.5 | |

=== Southern River ===
2025 Western Australian state election: Southern River
| Party | Candidate | Votes | % | ±% |
|---|---|---|---|---|
| Labor | Terry Healy | 15,693 | 58.5 | +12.6 |
| Liberal | Sudhir Chowdhary | 4,405 | 16.4 | −19.5 |
| Greens | Angela Hecquet | 2,103 | 7.8 | +2.0 |
| Christians | Alvin Mathew Vadakkedathu | 1,190 | 4.4 | +4.4 |
| One Nation | Ingrid Parkin | 1,174 | 4.4 | +4.4 |
| Legalise Cannabis | Graham Pereira | 1,068 | 4.0 | +4.0 |
| Independent | Glenn P. W. Dewhurst | 637 | 2.4 | +2.4 |
| Independent | Simon Simson | 295 | 1.1 | +1.1 |
| Shooters, Fishers, Farmers | Caleb Thomas | 263 | 1.0 | +1.0 |
| Total formal votes | | 26,828 | 94.7 | −1.3 |
| Informal votes | | 1,504 | 5.3 | +1.3 |
| Turnout | | 28,332 | 86.6 | +4.8 |
Two-party-preferred result
| Labor | Terry Healy | 19,658 | 73.4 | −9.8 |
| Liberal | Sudhir Chowdhary | 7,142 | 26.6 | +9.8 |
| Labor hold | | Swing | −9.8 | |

=== Swan Hills ===
2025 Western Australian state election: Swan Hills
| Party | Candidate | Votes | % | ±% |
|---|---|---|---|---|
| Labor | Michelle Maynard | 11,839 | 43.2 | −27.5 |
| Liberal | Rod Henderson | 6,883 | 25.1 | +6.7 |
| Greens | Christopher Poulton | 2,760 | 10.1 | +6.1 |
| National | Ben Giblett | 2,174 | 7.9 | +7.9 |
| One Nation | Scott Wilkinson | 2,115 | 7.7 | +7.7 |
| Christians | Magdeleen Strauss | 993 | 3.6 | +0.9 |
| Shooters, Fishers, Farmers | Ross Williamson | 617 | 2.3 | +2.3 |
| Total formal votes | | 27,381 | 95.1 | −0.3 |
| Informal votes | | 1,421 | 4.9 | +0.3 |
| Turnout | | 28,802 | 86.2 | +9.3 |
Two-party-preferred result
| Labor | Michelle Maynard | 15,979 | 58.4 | −18.8 |
| Liberal | Rod Henderson | 11,375 | 41.6 | +18.8 |
| Labor hold | | Swing | −18.8 | |

=== Thornlie ===
2025 Western Australian state election: Thornlie
| Party | Candidate | Votes | % | ±% |
|---|---|---|---|---|
| Labor | Colleen Egan | 11,574 | 46.5 | −27.4 |
| Liberal | Mahesh Arumugam | 3,761 | 15.1 | +1.0 |
| Greens | Adam Abdul Razak | 2,644 | 10.6 | +5.7 |
| Independent | Kevin McDonald | 2,548 | 10.2 | +10.2 |
| One Nation | Timothy Larcombe | 2,072 | 8.3 | +8.3 |
| Christians | Madeleine Goiran | 1,344 | 5.4 | +1.1 |
| Legalise Cannabis | Fred Mulholland | 959 | 3.9 | +3.9 |
| Total formal votes | | 24,902 | 94.2 | −1.7 |
| Informal votes | | 1,544 | 5.8 | +1.7 |
| Turnout | | 26,446 | 82.7 | +5.0 |
Notional two-party-preferred count (Note: Estimated two-party-preferred count by Antony Green.)
| Labor | Colleen Egan | 17,246 | 69.3 | −11.2 |
| Liberal | Mahesh Arumugam | 7,630 | 30.7 | +11.2 |
Two-candidate-preferred result
| Labor | Colleen Egan | 15,916 | 64.0 | −16.6 |
| Independent | Kevin McDonald | 8,952 | 36.0 | +36.0 |
| Labor hold | | | | |

=== Vasse ===
2025 Western Australian state election: Vasse
| Party | Candidate | Votes | % | ±% |
|---|---|---|---|---|
| Liberal | Libby Mettam | 14,511 | 52.0 | +7.5 |
| Labor | Evan Lewis | 6,499 | 23.3 | −11.5 |
| Greens | Mia Krasenstein | 3,814 | 13.7 | +4.2 |
| One Nation | Steve Kefalinos | 1,352 | 4.8 | +3.8 |
| Legalise Cannabis | Shelley Leech | 1,097 | 3.9 | +2.5 |
| Christians | Stephen Cox | 621 | 2.2 | +2.2 |
| Total formal votes | | 27,894 | 95.9 | −0.6 |
| Informal votes | | 1,190 | 4.1 | +0.6 |
| Turnout | | 29,084 | 87.3 | +5.4 |
Two-party-preferred result
| Liberal | Libby Mettam | 17,688 | 63.4 | +9.1 |
| Labor | Evan Lewis | 10,196 | 36.6 | −9.1 |
| Liberal hold | | Swing | +9.1 | |

=== Victoria Park ===
2025 Western Australian state election: Victoria Park
| Party | Candidate | Votes | % | ±% |
|---|---|---|---|---|
| Labor | Hannah Beazley | 11,323 | 45.7 | −18.0 |
| Liberal | Andra Biondi | 6,512 | 26.3 | +9.8 |
| Greens | Jack Gordon-Manley | 5,113 | 20.6 | +8.1 |
| Christians | Linda Watson | 1,116 | 4.5 | +2.2 |
| Animal Justice | Roberta Vlaar | 738 | 3.0 | +3.0 |
| Total formal votes | | 24,802 | 96.4 | −0.3 |
| Informal votes | | 924 | 3.6 | +0.3 |
| Turnout | | 25,726 | 83.7 | +3.4 |
Two-party-preferred result
| Labor | Hannah Beazley | 16,550 | 66.7 | −10.9 |
| Liberal | Andra Biondi | 8,249 | 33.3 | +10.9 |
| Labor hold | | Swing | −10.9 | |

=== Wanneroo ===
2025 Western Australian state election: Wanneroo
| Party | Candidate | Votes | % | ±% |
|---|---|---|---|---|
| Labor | Sabine Winton | 13,585 | 50.9 | −21.0 |
| Liberal | Joshua Kingshott | 7,557 | 28.3 | +10.0 |
| Greens | Martin Dupont | 2,302 | 8.6 | +4.1 |
| Legalise Cannabis | Kunal Naresh Parbat | 1,367 | 5.1 | +5.1 |
| Christians | Hendrik Holtzhausen | 1,244 | 4.7 | +4.7 |
| Shooters, Fishers, Farmers | Trevor Ruwoldt | 629 | 2.4 | +2.4 |
| Total formal votes | | 26,684 | 95.2 | −0.5 |
| Informal votes | | 1,342 | 4.8 | +0.5 |
| Turnout | | 28,026 | 84.7 | +3.5 |
Two-party-preferred result
| Labor | Sabine Winton | 16,661 | 62.5 | −16.0 |
| Liberal | Joshua Kingshott | 10,013 | 37.5 | +16.0 |
| Labor hold | | Swing | −16.0 | |

=== Warren-Blackwood ===
2025 Western Australian state election: Warren-Blackwood
| Party | Candidate | Votes | % | ±% |
|---|---|---|---|---|
| Labor | Jane Kelsbie | 7,184 | 27.2 | −5.0 |
| National | Bevan Eatts | 5,757 | 21.8 | −7.2 |
| Liberal | Wade De Campo | 5,721 | 21.6 | +8.9 |
| Greens | Julie Marsh | 4,407 | 16.7 | +1.9 |
| Legalise Cannabis | Aaron Peet | 1,276 | 4.8 | +2.4 |
| One Nation | Stephen James O'Connor | 1,144 | 4.3 | +2.8 |
| Christians | Martin Hartigan | 525 | 2.0 | +2.0 |
| Shooters, Fishers, Farmers | Paul John Da Silva | 428 | 1.6 | −2.3 |
| Total formal votes | | 26,442 | 95.9 | −0.4 |
| Informal votes | | 1,141 | 4.1 | +0.4 |
| Turnout | | 27,583 | 88.0 | +6.5 |
Two-candidate-preferred result
| National | Bevan Eatts | 13,683 | 51.8 | +4.0 |
| Labor | Jane Kelsbie | 12,733 | 48.2 | −4.0 |
| National gain from Labor | | Swing | +4.0 | |

=== West Swan ===
2025 Western Australian state election: West Swan
| Party | Candidate | Votes | % | ±% |
|---|---|---|---|---|
| Labor | Rita Saffioti | 16,011 | 57.3 | −21.2 |
| Liberal | Lucky Saini | 4,990 | 17.9 | +6.5 |
| Greens | Ben Hermann | 2,947 | 10.6 | +6.7 |
| One Nation | Cristina Pomana | 1,651 | 5.9 | +5.9 |
| Legalise Cannabis | Elliott Taylor | 1,257 | 4.5 | +4.5 |
| Christians | Dara Connors | 1,077 | 3.9 | +0.8 |
| Total formal votes | | 27,933 | 94.9 | −0.6 |
| Informal votes | | 1,495 | 5.1 | +0.6 |
| Turnout | | 29,428 | 85.4 | +5.9 |
Two-party-preferred result
| Labor | Rita Saffioti | 19,864 | 71.2 | −13.6 |
| Liberal | Lucky Saini | 8,054 | 28.8 | +13.6 |
| Labor hold | | Swing | −13.6 | |
