= Electoral results for the district of Bibra Lake =

Western Australian district election results

This is a list of electoral results for the electoral district of Bibra Lake in Western Australian state elections.

== Members for Bibra Lake ==
Member	Party	Term
Sook Yee Lai	Labor	2025–present

== Election results ==
=== Elections in the 2020s ===
2025 Western Australian state election: Bibra Lake
Party	Candidate	Votes	%	±%
Labor	Sook Yee Lai	10,664	41.8	−23.9
Liberal	Atul Garg	4,450	17.5	−0.0
Greens	Robyn Walsh	4,282	16.8	+6.5
Independent	Michael Separovich	2,059	8.1	+8.1
Independent	Lisa Griffiths	1,288	5.1	+5.1
One Nation	Bradley Dickinson	1,063	4.2	+2.8
Legalise Cannabis	Bradley Gibb	926	3.6	+3.6
Christians	Leon Yeap	753	3.0	+3.0
Total formal votes		25,485	94.4	−1.8
Informal votes		1,512	5.6	+1.8
Turnout		26,997	84.2	+0.8
Notional two-party-preferred count
Labor	Sook Yee Lai	18,193	71.4	−6.7
Liberal	Atul Garg	7,292	28.6	+6.7
Two-candidate-preferred result
Labor	Sook Yee Lai	16,339	64.2	−13.9
Greens	Robyn Walsh	9,092	35.8	+35.8
Labor hold				
