= Electoral results for the district of Kalamunda =

Electoral results of kalamunda

This is a list of electoral results for the electoral district of Kalamunda in Western Australian state elections.

== Members for Kalamunda ==
Kalamunda (1974–1989)
Member	Party	Term
Ian Thompson	Liberal	1974–1989
Kalamunda (2008–present)
John Day	Liberal	2008–2017
Matthew Hughes	Labor	2017–2025
Adam Hort	Liberal	2025–present

== Election results ==
=== Elections in the 2020s ===
2025 Western Australian state election: Kalamunda
Party	Candidate	Votes	%	±%
Labor	Karen Beale	9,120	32.2	−21.9
Liberal	Adam Hort	8,874	31.4	+2.2
Greens	Janelle Sewell	4,197	14.8	+6.5
National	Lisa Logan	2,588	9.1	+9.1
One Nation	Robert Critchley	1,375	4.9	+3.6
Legalise Cannabis	Penelope Young	991	3.5	+3.5
Christians	Shemma Timney	715	2.5	−0.2
Shooters, Fishers, Farmers	George Taylor	438	1.5	+1.5
Total formal votes		28,298	96.3	−0.3
Informal votes		1,093	3.7	+0.3
Turnout		29,391	89.4	−1.3
Two-party-preferred result
Liberal	Adam Hort	14,178	50.1	+14.7
Labor	Karen Beale	14,096	49.9	−14.7
Liberal gain from Labor		Swing	+14.7	

2021 Western Australian state election: Kalamunda
Party	Candidate	Votes	%	±%
Labor	Matthew Hughes	13,100	51.3	+14.3
Liberal	Liam Staltari	8,124	31.8	−5.9
Greens	Lee-Anne Miles	2,164	8.5	−4.3
Christians	Brady Williams	651	2.5	−0.2
No Mandatory Vaccination	Michael Fane	415	1.6	+1.6
Liberal Democrats	Carolyn Trigwell	382	1.5	+1.4
One Nation	Maureen Butters	372	1.5	−5.8
Western Australia	Stephen Phelan	267	1.0	−0.2
WAxit	Robert Ellis	74	0.3	−0.7
Total formal votes		25,549	96.8	+0.7
Informal votes		836	3.2	−0.7
Turnout		26,385	89.3	−0.1
Two-party-preferred result
Labor	Matthew Hughes	15,781	61.8	+9.5
Liberal	Liam Staltari	9,763	38.2	−9.5
Labor hold		Swing	+9.5	

=== Elections in the 2010s ===
2017 Western Australian state election: Kalamunda
Party	Candidate	Votes	%	±%
Liberal	John Day	8,768	37.5	−12.2
Labor	Matthew Hughes	8,683	37.1	+13.9
Greens	Lee-Anne Miles	3,039	13.0	+3.6
One Nation	Ray Gould	1,691	7.2	+7.2
Christians	Brady Williams	653	2.8	+0.1
Matheson for WA	Murray Bowyer	305	1.3	+1.3
Micro Business	Evazelia Colyvas	234	1.0	+1.0
Total formal votes		23,373	96.1	+1.0
Informal votes		939	3.9	−1.0
Turnout		24,312	90.4	−1.4
Two-party-preferred result
Labor	Matthew Hughes	12,268	52.5	+12.7
Liberal	John Day	11,100	47.5	−12.7
Labor gain from Liberal		Swing	+12.7	

2013 Western Australian state election: Kalamunda
Party	Candidate	Votes	%	±%
Liberal	John Day	9,624	47.5	–0.1
Labor	Mick Wainwright	4,480	22.1	–9.4
Independent	Geoff Stallard	2,780	13.7	+13.7
Greens	Toni Warden	1,658	8.2	–6.6
Independent	Greg Ross	1,120	5.5	+5.5
Christians	Hannah Williams	612	3.0	–1.1
Total formal votes		20,274	94.4	
Informal votes		1,213	5.6	
Turnout		21,487	90.5	
Two-party-preferred result
Liberal	John Day	12,241	60.5	+4.2
Labor	Mick Wainwright	8,008	39.5	–4.2
Liberal hold		Swing	+4.2	

=== Elections in the 2000s ===
2008 Western Australian state election: Kalamunda
Party	Candidate	Votes	%	±%
Liberal	John Day	9,257	47.6	+4.5
Labor	Juliana Plummer	6,121	31.5	−8.3
Greens	Toni Warden	2,871	14.8	+6.0
Christian Democrats	Rob Merrells	806	4.1	+0.5
Family First	Ian Hopkinson	401	2.1	−0.3
Total formal votes		19,456	94.4	−0.8
Informal votes		1,158	5.6	+0.8
Turnout		20,614	87.7	
Two-party-preferred result
Liberal	John Day	10,939	56.3	+6.1
Labor	Juliana Plummer	8,508	43.8	−6.1
Liberal hold		Swing	+6.1	

=== Elections in the 1980s ===
1986 Western Australian state election: Kalamunda
Party	Candidate	Votes	%	±%
Liberal	Ian Thompson	5,555	58.9	+1.5
Labor	Jacqueline Jeffreys	3,873	41.1	+3.8
Total formal votes		9,428	98.0	+0.6
Informal votes		194	2.0	−0.6
Turnout		9,622	91.8	+2.9
Liberal hold		Swing	−1.2	

1983 Western Australian state election: Kalamunda
Party	Candidate	Votes	%	±%
Liberal	Ian Thompson	4,444	57.4	
Labor	Theraza Glindon	2,886	37.3	
Democrats	Phillip Franzone	418	5.4	
Total formal votes		7,748	97.4	
Informal votes		209	2.6	
Turnout		7,957	88.9	
Two-party-preferred result
Liberal	Ian Thompson	4,657	60.1	
Labor	Theraza Glindon	3,091	39.9	
Liberal hold		Swing		

1980 Western Australian state election: Kalamunda
Party	Candidate	Votes	%	±%
Liberal	Ian Thompson	5,042	59.5	−9.1
Labor	Kay Hallahan	2,594	30.6	−0.8
Democrats	Elizabeth Capill	837	9.9	+9.9
Total formal votes		8,473	97.2	−0.4
Informal votes		243	2.8	+0.4
Turnout		8,716	89.5	−1.0
Two-party-preferred result
Liberal	Ian Thompson	5,460	64.4	−4.2
Labor	Kay Hallahan	3,013	35.6	+4.2
Liberal hold		Swing	−4.2	

=== Elections in the 1970s ===
1977 Western Australian state election: Kalamunda
Party	Candidate	Votes	%	±%
Liberal	Ian Thompson	5,397	68.6	
Labor	Shane Baker	2,468	31.4	
Total formal votes		7,865	97.6	
Informal votes		190	2.4	
Turnout		8,055	90.5	
Liberal hold		Swing		

1974 Western Australian state election: Kalamunda
Party	Candidate	Votes	%	±%
Liberal	Ian Thompson	4,521	54.9	
Labor	Michael Marsh	2,917	35.4	
National Alliance	Benjamin Ballantyne	643	7.8	
Independent	Francesco Nesci	153	1.9	
Total formal votes		8,234	97.0	
Informal votes		253	3.0	
Turnout		8,487	90.7	
Two-party-preferred result
Liberal	Ian Thompson	5,149	62.5	
Labor	Michael Marsh	3,085	37.5	
Liberal hold		Swing		
