= Electoral results for the district of Landsdale =

Western Australian district election results

This is a list of electoral results for the electoral district of Landsdale in Western Australian state elections.

== Members for Landsdale ==
| Member | Party | Term |
|---|---|---|
| Margaret Quirk | Labor | 2021–2025 |
| Daniel Pastorelli | Labor | 2025–present |

== Election results ==
=== Elections in the 2020s ===
2025 Western Australian state election: Landsdale
| Party | Candidate | Votes | % | ±% |
|---|---|---|---|---|
| Labor | Daniel Pastorelli | 13,756 | 49.8 | −19.2 |
| Liberal | Marizane Moore | 8,775 | 31.8 | +11.8 |
| Greens | Michaela King | 2,417 | 8.8 | +4.5 |
| Christians | Candice Parsons | 1,398 | 5.1 | +4.8 |
| Independent | Ziggi Murphy | 1,268 | 4.6 | +4.6 |
| Total formal votes | | 27,614 | 95.1 | −0.5 |
| Informal votes | | 1,428 | 4.9 | +0.5 |
| Turnout | | 29,042 | 89.9 | +6.8 |
Two-party-preferred result
| Labor | Daniel Pastorelli | 16,444 | 59.6 | −16.0 |
| Liberal | Marizane Moore | 11,163 | 40.4 | +16.0 |
| Labor hold | | Swing | −16.0 | |

2021 Western Australian state election: Landsdale
| Party | Candidate | Votes | % | ±% |
|---|---|---|---|---|
| Labor | Margaret Quirk | 18,217 | 69.3 | +19.4 |
| Liberal | Brett Raponi | 5,293 | 20.1 | −11.9 |
| Greens | Katrina House | 1,090 | 4.1 | −2.1 |
| Western Australia | Shailee Desai | 878 | 3.3 | +3.1 |
| No Mandatory Vaccination | Leah Beedham | 579 | 2.2 | +2.2 |
| WAxit | Sareeta Doobree | 236 | 0.9 | −0.7 |
| Total formal votes | | 26,293 | 95.7 | +0.8 |
| Informal votes | | 1,183 | 4.3 | −0.8 |
| Turnout | | 27,476 | 88.5 | +2.9 |
Two-party-preferred result
| Labor | Margaret Quirk | 19,820 | 75.4 | +15.8 |
| Liberal | Brett Raponi | 6,471 | 24.6 | −15.8 |
| Labor hold | | Swing | +15.8 | |
