= Sophia Moermond =

Australian politician

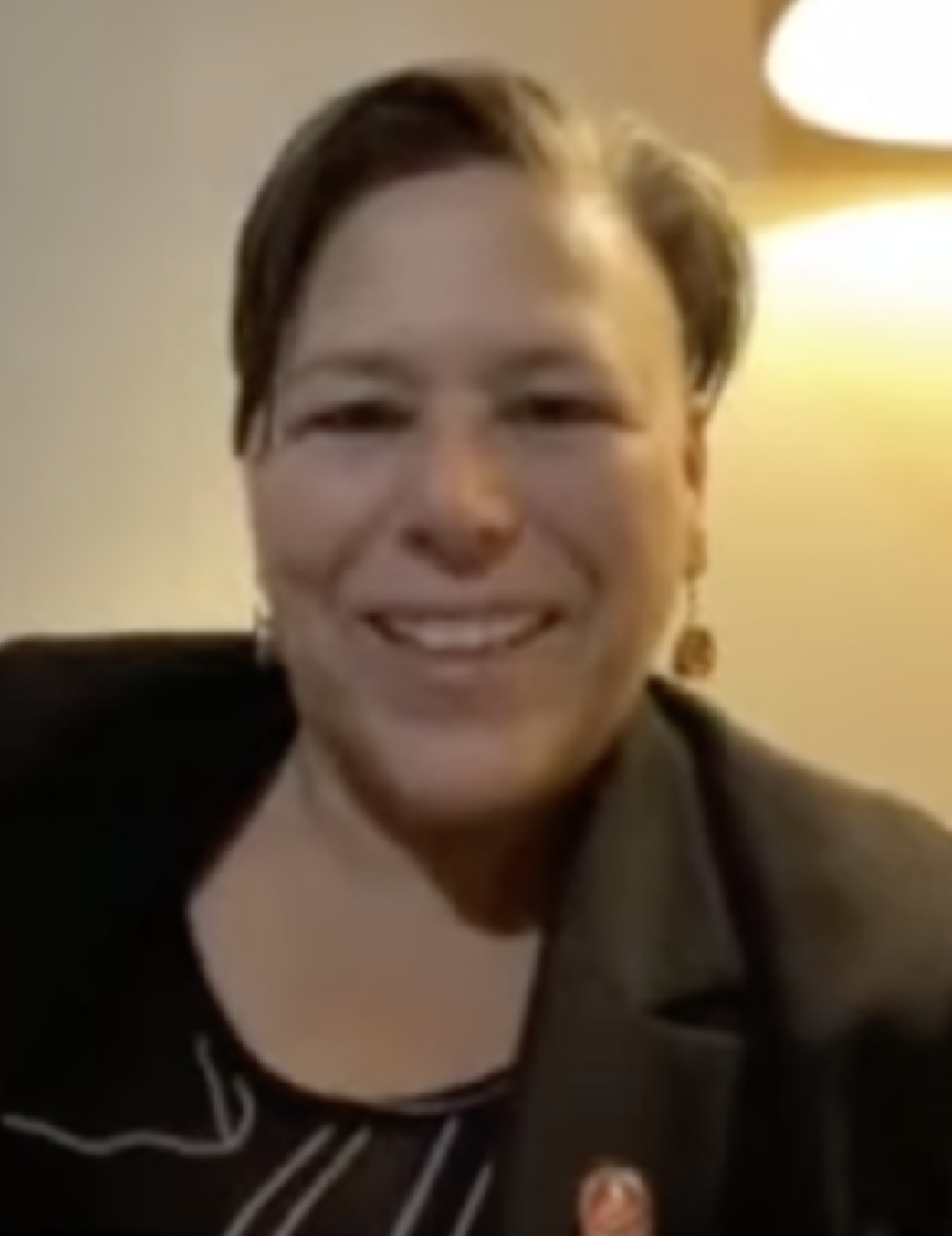

Member of the Western Australian Legislative Council for South West Region
- In office 22 May 2021 – May 2025

Personal details
- Born: 14 September 1968 (age 57) Rotterdam, Netherlands
- Party: Independent (since 2024)
- Other political affiliations: Legalise Cannabis (until 2024)

Sophia Moermond (born 14 September 1968) is an Australian politician. She was elected to the Western Australian Legislative Council at the 2021 state election, formerly representing Legalise Cannabis Western Australia Party, before quitting the party in May 2024 to sit as an independent. She stood as an independent candidate in the 2025 Western Australian state election but was not elected, thus losing her seat.

== Early life ==
Moermond was born in Rotterdam on 14 September 1968. She moved to South Africa with her parents in 1972, returning to the Netherlands four years later. The family immigrated to Australia in 1983, settling in Heathridge, Western Australia. She attended Ocean Reef Senior High School, then returned to the Netherlands to study nursing. She graduated in 1991 and returned to Australia.

== Career ==
Prior to entering politics, Moermond was a practising naturopath.

== Politics ==
At the 2021 Western Australian state election, Moermond was elected to the Western Australian Legislative Council as a member for Legalise Cannabis WA in the South West Region.

On 9 May 2024 Moermond quit Legalise Cannabis to sit as an independent, citing a difference in views between herself and Brian Walker on offshore wind turbines. Differences between herself and Brian Walker on transgender rights may have also contributed to her departure from the party.

She was an independent candidate in the 2025 Western Australian state election but neither she nor any other independent candidates were elected.

=== Political positions ===
Moermond has described COVID-19 vaccine mandates as "medical apartheid" and has warned that they will end in "violence". In February 2022 she was suspended for some time from parliament under rules requiring MPs to present a digital identification certificate from Medicare highlighting their COVID-19 vaccination status (exempt or not).

Moermond is also an outspoken critic of transgender rights.
