= Opposition Alliance =

Opposition Alliance may refer to:

- Nation Alliance (Turkey), an electoral alliance of opposition parties in Turkey
- Opposition (Western Australia), the National-Liberal Alliance formed in Western Australia in 2021
- Opposition Alliance (Georgia)
- Opposition Alliance of Kosovo
- South Sudan Opposition Alliance, a coalition of political parties and armed groups in South Sudan

== See also ==
- Opposition (politics)
