= Climate change in Western Australia =

Climate change in Western Australia affects various environments and industries, including agriculture.

== Greenhouse gas emissions ==
By 2022, annual emissions in Western Australia increased by 10% compared to 2005. The state's emissions amounted to 76.23 million tonnes in 2005 compared to 82.64 million tonnes in 2022.

== Impacts of climate change ==
=== Human health ===
Heat-related deaths in Perth may rise by 60% over the period from 2024 to 2050. The incidence of cardiovascular, respiratory and neurological disorders would rise. Potentially food and water security may be compromised.

=== Flooding ===
Flooding has significantly damaged roads and is expected to increase in frequency.

== Response ==
=== Policies ===
In November 2020, the Western Australian government released its long-awaited climate policy, which articulated an aspiration, but no commitment to achieving zero emissions by 2050. The Western Australian government approved a 50-year extension to the North West Shelf gas project in 2024. Public transport was free during the period from December 14, 2024 to February 5, 2025.

=== Legislation ===
The Western Australian government shelved a bill to legislate a binding 2030 emissions target ahead of the 2025 state election.

== See also ==
- Climate change in Australia
