= Brian Walker (politician) =

Australian politician (born 1954)

The Honourable Brian Walker MLC
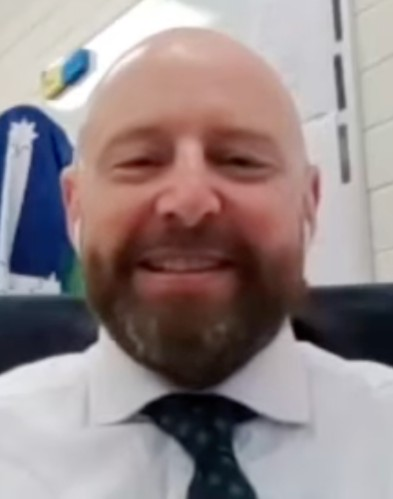

Leader of Legalise Cannabis WA
- Incumbent
- Assumed office 9 May 2024
- Constituency: Western Australia

Member of the Western Australian Legislative Council for Western Australia
- Incumbent
- Assumed office 22 May 2021

Personal details
- Born: 5 September 1954 (age 71) Johor Bahru, Malaysia
- Party: Legalise Cannabis
- Education: University of Dundee
- Profession: General Practitioner
- Website: brianwalkermlc.com.au

Brian Follett Walker (born 5 September 1954) is an Australian politician who serves as a member of the Western Australian Legislative Council, representing the East Metropolitan Region. He is a member of Legalise Cannabis WA, and has served as its leader since 2024.

== Early life ==
Walker was born in Malaysia to Scottish parents, and was educated at Scotch College, Perth, prior to studying medicine at the University of Dundee. Since graduating, he has since practiced medicine in Germany, the Soviet Union, the United Kingdom, and Hong Kong, returning to Perth in 2008, to set up a specialist GP practice in the Perth Hills.

== Political career ==
Walker was a medical practitioner before entering politics. At the 2021 Western Australian state election, Walker was elected to the Legislative Council as a member for the East Metropolitan Region, and his term commenced on 22 May 2021. He was re-elected in the 2025 Western Australian state election. In March 2026, Walker tabled the Misuse of Drugs (Lawful Personal Use of Cannabis) Amendment Bill 2026 in the Legislative Council, which would permit adults to cultivate up to six cannabis plants, possess up to 50 grams for personal use, and gift cannabis to other adults.
