= Matthew Hughes (politician) =

Australian politician

Member of the Western Australian Legislative Assembly for Kalamunda
- In office 11 March 2017 – 5 February 2025
- Preceded by: John Day
- Succeeded by: Adam Hort

Personal details
- Born: 9 February 1950 (age 76) Audenshaw, England, United Kingdom
- Party: Labor
- Occupation: Teacher and principal

Matthew Hughes (born 9 February 1950) is an Australian former politician. He was a Labor member of the Western Australian Legislative Assembly from the 2017 state election, representing Kalamunda, until his retirement at the 2025 state election.

Hughes was born in Audenshaw in the United Kingdom, and moved to Australia in 1979. He was a teacher and the principal of John Septimus Roe Anglican Community School, and also served on Swan City Council.

He is affiliated with the United Workers Union, which is aligned with the Labor Left faction.

Hughes announced his retirement as the Member for Kalamunda on 9 February 2024, his 74th birthday.

== Controversy and bullying claims ==
In April 2020, Hughes was called on to resign from the Joint Standing Committee on the Corruption and Crime Commission by Liberal leader Liza Harvey and Nick Goiran after posting comments on Facebook that broke the confidentiality of parliamentary committees. Harvey accused Hughes of breaking the Chatham House Rule nature of all parliamentary committees and damaging the integrity of the parliamentary committee process.

In March 2021, prior to the 2021 Western Australia state election, Hughes was accused of bullying by three former staff members.

Later in March 2021, further claims from these three former staff members were published that detailed Hughes verbally abusing staff, punching objects in the office to startle staff, and the toxic environment. These accusations led to the Community and Public Sector Union asking the Department of Premier and Cabinet to better educate Members of Parliament on how to treat their staff. The women involved in the complaint said they had been let down by Premier Mark McGowan, who defended Hughes by saying he was a decent man.

After the election, McGowan promoted Hughes to the Chair of the Joint Standing Committee on the Corruption and Crime Commission.

In late June 2021, complaints about Hughes emerged again, this time from a former student of John Septimus Roe Anglican Community School about the conduct of Hughes when he was principal there. The former student alleged that she was sexually assaulted as a 13-year-old by a student who was four years older than her, and that as principal of the school, Hughes did nothing to help and that the school took no steps to create a safe environment for her after she reported three incidents, including one on school grounds.

Western Australian Legislative Assembly
Preceded by John Day	Member for Kalamunda; 2017–2025	Succeeded by Adam Hort
