= Kim Giddens =

Western Australian politician (born 1979)

Kim Giddens MLA

Member of the Western Australian Legislative Assembly for Bateman
- Incumbent
- Assumed office 13 March 2021
- Preceded by: Dean Nalder

Personal details
- Born: 30 December 1979 (age 46) Nhulunbuy, Northern Territory
- Party: Labor

Kim Elizabeth Giddens (born 30 December 1979) is an Australian politician. She has been an Australian Labor Party member of the Western Australian Legislative Assembly since 2021, representing the electoral district of Bateman.

Giddens studied politics and international relations at the University of New South Wales and education at Charles Darwin University. Prior to entering politics, Giddens was the principal policy advisor to state MP Peter Tinley. She had previously worked for the Tasmanian Government.

She was elected at the 2021 Western Australian state election with a 14.5% swing in the two-party-preferred vote, becoming the first Labor MP to represent the traditionally Liberal seat previously held by minister Dean Nalder.

Giddens was re-elected in the 2025 Western Australian state election.

Western Australian Legislative Assembly
Preceded by Dean Nalder	Member for Bateman; 2021–present	Incumbent
