= Electoral district of Bibra Lake =

Electoral district of the Western Australian Legislative Assembly

Bibra Lake Western Australia—Legislative Assembly
- Interactive map of district boundaries from the 2025 state election
- State: Western Australia
- Created: 2025
- MP: Sook Yee Lai
- Party: Labor
- Namesake: Bibra Lake, Western Australia
- Electors: 32,053 (2025)
- Area: 37 km^{2} (14.3 sq mi)
- Demographic: Outer-metropolitan
- Coordinates: 32.10°S 115.81°E
Electorates around Bibra Lake:
Fremantle	Bicton; Bateman	Riverton
Fremantle	Bibra Lake	Jandakot
Cockburn	Cockburn	Jandakot

Bibra Lake is an electoral district of the Western Australian Legislative Assembly.

Bibra Lake is located in Perth, covering the vast majority of the former Electoral district of Willagee, which was abolished at the 2023 redistribution after the seat's namesake suburb was moved into the seat of Bicton, whilst also gaining parts of the seat of Fremantle.

Bibra Lake was first contested at the 2025 state election. It was notionally held by the Labor Party on a 28.2% margin. Sook Yee Lai became the inaugural MP following the election.

== Members for Bibra Lake ==
Member	Party	Term
Sook Yee Lai	Labor	2025–present

== Election results ==
2025 Western Australian state election: Bibra Lake
Party	Candidate	Votes	%	±%
Labor	Sook Yee Lai	10,664	41.8	−23.9
Liberal	Atul Garg	4,450	17.5	−0.0
Greens	Robyn Walsh	4,282	16.8	+6.5
Independent	Michael Separovich	2,059	8.1	+8.1
Independent	Lisa Griffiths	1,288	5.1	+5.1
One Nation	Bradley Dickinson	1,063	4.2	+2.8
Legalise Cannabis	Bradley Gibb	926	3.6	+3.6
Christians	Leon Yeap	753	3.0	+3.0
Total formal votes		25,485	94.4	−1.8
Informal votes		1,512	5.6	+1.8
Turnout		26,997	84.2	+0.8
Notional two-party-preferred count
Labor	Sook Yee Lai	18,193	71.4	−6.7
Liberal	Atul Garg	7,292	28.6	+6.7
Two-candidate-preferred result
Labor	Sook Yee Lai	16,339	64.2	−13.9
Greens	Robyn Walsh	9,092	35.8	+35.8
Labor hold				
