= Shadow cabinet of Western Australia =

Largest political party not in government

The Opposition in the Australian state of Western Australia comprises the largest party or coalition of parties not in Government. The Opposition's purpose is to hold the Government to account and constitute a "Government-in-waiting" should the existing Government fall. To that end, a Leader of the Opposition and Shadow Ministers for the various government departments question the Premier and Ministers on Government policy and administration, and formulate the policy the Opposition would pursue in Government. It is sometimes styled "His Majesty's Loyal Opposition" to demonstrate that although it opposes the Government, it remains loyal to the King.

The current Leader of the Opposition is Liberals Leader Basil Zempilas.

== Current arrangement ==
Shadow Minister	Portfolio	Image
Basil Zempilas MLA	Leader of the Opposition; Shadow Minister for: State Development; Citizenship and Multicultural Interests; Leader of the WA Liberal Party	
Libby Mettam MLA	Deputy Leader of the Opposition; Shadow Minister for: Health; Mental Health; Prevention of Family & Domestic Violence; Defence Industries and AUKUS; Deputy Leader of the WA Liberal Party	
Shane Love MLA	Shadow Minister for: Regional Development; Mines and Petroleum; Electoral Affairs; Leader of the National Party	
Peter Rundle MLA	Shadow Minister for: Water; Sport and Recreation; Deputy Leader of the National Party	
Sandra Brewer MLA	Shadow Treasurer; Shadow Minister for Women's Interests	
David Bolt MLA	Shadow Minister for: Housing and Homelessness; Environment and Climate; Science and Innovation; Deputy Leader of the National Party	
Bevan Eatts MLA	Shadow Minister for: Forestry; Aged Care	
Hon. Nick Goiran MLC	Shadow Attorney General; Shadow Minister for Child Protection	
Adam Hort MLA	Shadow Minister for: Police; Corrective Services; Youth	
Lachlan Hunter MLA	Shadow Minister for: Agriculture and Food; Racing and Gaming	
Jonathan Huston MLA	Shadow Minister for: Deregulation; Small Business; Public Sector Reform; Veterans	
Scott Leary MLA	Shadow Minister for: Commerce; Tourism	
Hon. Steven Martin MLC	Shadow Minister for: Transport; Ports; Communities	
Hon. Tjorn Sibma MLC	Shadow Minister for: Finance; Training and Workforce Development; Major Infrastructure	
Liam Staltari MLA	Shadow Minister for: Education; Early Childhood; Disability Services; Heritage	
Hon. Steve Thomas MLC	Shadow Minister for: Energy; Industrial Relations	
Hon. Neil Thomson MLC	Shadow Minister for: Planning and Lands; Aboriginal Affairs; Seniors	
Kirrilee Warr MLA	Shadow Minister for: Local Government; Fisheries	

== See also ==
- Opposition (Australia)
- Leader of the Opposition (Western Australia)
