= Electoral district of Landsdale =

State electoral district in Perth, Western Australia

Landsdale Western Australia—Legislative Assembly
- Interactive map of electoral district boundaries from the 2025 state election
- State: Western Australia
- Dates current: 2021–present
- MP: Daniel Pastorelli
- Party: Labor
- Namesake: Landsdale
- Electors: 32,307 (2025)
- Area: 65 km^{2} (25.1 sq mi)
- Demographic: Metropolitan
- Coordinates: 31.77°S 115.85°E
Electorates around Landsdale:
Wanneroo	Wanneroo	Swan Hills
Kingsley	Landsdale	West Swan
Kingsley	Girrawheen	West Swan

Landsdale is an electoral district of the Legislative Assembly in the Australian state of Western Australia. It has been held by Labor's Daniel Pastorelli since the 2025 state election.

== Geography ==
Landsdale is located in Perth's northern suburbs. It is bounded to the west by Wanneroo Road, to the south by Hepburn Avenue and Marangaroo Drive, to the east by Alexander Drive. Its northernmost boundary is Elliot Road in Hocking. The districts includes the suburbs of Landsdale, Darch, Madeley, Alexander Heights, Wangara, Pearsall and Hocking.

== History ==
The district was created for the 2021 state election, essentially as a new name for the district of Girrawheen. It is a notional fairly safe Labor seat.

== Members for Landsdale ==
Member	Party	Term
Margaret Quirk	Labor	2021–2025
Daniel Pastorelli	Labor	2025–present

== Election results ==
2025 Western Australian state election: Landsdale
Party	Candidate	Votes	%	±%
Labor	Daniel Pastorelli	13,756	49.8	−19.2
Liberal	Marizane Moore	8,775	31.8	+11.8
Greens	Michaela King	2,417	8.8	+4.5
Christians	Candice Parsons	1,398	5.1	+4.8
Independent	Ziggi Murphy	1,268	4.6	+4.6
Total formal votes		27,614	95.1	−0.5
Informal votes		1,428	4.9	+0.5
Turnout		29,042	89.9	+6.8
Two-party-preferred result
Labor	Daniel Pastorelli	16,444	59.6	−16.0
Liberal	Marizane Moore	11,163	40.4	+16.0
Labor hold		Swing	−16.0	
