= Sook Yee Lai =

Western Australian politician

Sook Yee Lai MLA
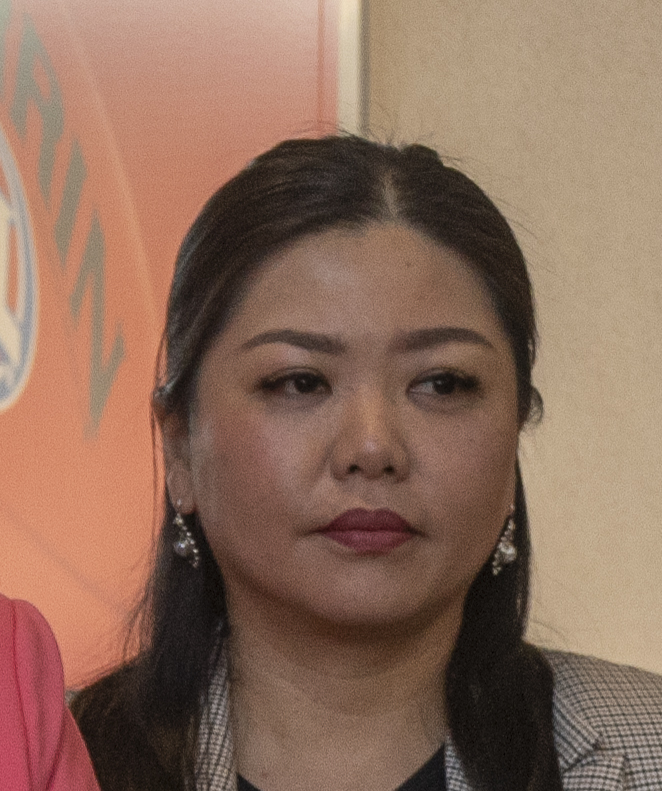
- Lai in 2025

Member of the Western Australian Legislative Assembly for Bibra Lake
- Incumbent
- Assumed office 8 March 2025
- Preceded by: Seat established

Personal details
- Born: Ipoh, Perak, Malaysia
- Party: Labor
- Education: Murdoch University
- Website: sookyeelai.com.au

Sook Yee Lai is an Australian politician from the Labor Party who is member of the Western Australian Legislative Assembly for the electoral district of Bibra Lake. Born in Malaysia, Sook grew up on Christmas Island before moving to Perth.

Previously a teacher, Lai was elected to the Western Australian Legislative Assembly for the first time at the 2025 state election.

== Early life ==
Sook Yee Lai was born in Ipoh, Perak, Malaysia. She is of Chinese descent. Her family moved to Australia when she was young and she grew up on Christmas Island. As a teenager, she moved to Perth to finish high school.

After school, Lai obtained a double undergraduate degree in Asian studies and education from Murdoch University in Perth.

== Before politics ==
Lai first had a career as a high school teacher before moving to work in the mining industry. She took time out of work to raise her family before returning as a working mum. She has also been secretary of Christmas Island Stories – an association which chronicles the people and heritage of Christmas Island.

== Political career ==
Before running for election, Lai worked as the chief of staff for Sam Lim, Labor Party federal representative for Tangney in Western Australia.

At the 2025 Western Australian state election, Lai stood for Labor in the electoral district of Bibra Lake. Former MLA Peter Tinley, who represented the former electoral district of Willagee before it was replaced by Bibra Lake, had decided not to seek re-election. Lai won the Bibra Lake seat after gaining 10,664 votes.

Following her election, Lai was appointed vice-president of the Western Australian branch of the Labor Party. In April 2025, Lai became acting speaker of the Western Australian Legislative Assembly and a member of the Education and Health Standing Committee.

Western Australian Legislative Assembly
New district	Member for Bibra Lake; 2025–present	Incumbent
