= Daniel Pastorelli =

Australian politician

Minister for Mines, Petroleum and Exploration
- Incumbent
- Assumed office 13 July 2025
- Premier: Roger Cook
- Preceded by: David Michael (as Minister for Mines and Petroleum)

Member of the Western Australian Legislative Assembly
- Incumbent
- Assumed office 8 March 2025
- Preceded by: Margaret Quirk
- Constituency: Landsdale

Personal details
- Party: Labor
- Website: danielpastorelli.com.au

Daniel Pastorelli is an Australian politician who has been the member for Landsdale in the Western Australian Legislative Assembly for the Labor Party since the March 2025 state election. Prior to that, he worked as a political advisor for state MPs Mark McGowan, Rita Saffioti, and Roger Cook, including as the chief of staff to McGowan and Cook during their times as the premier of Western Australia.

== Early life ==
Pastorelli was born around 1987 to a family of Italian descent.

== Career ==
Pastorelli first worked in politics for Labor state MP and Education Minister Mark McGowan during the Carpenter government in the mid-2000s. Following Labor's 2008 state election loss, Pastorelli worked for Rita Saffioti. After McGowan became Opposition Leader in 2012, Pastorelli worked as one of McGowan's lead media advisors, and following Labor's victory in the 2017 state election and McGowan's ascension to the role of premier, Pastorelli became his director of communications. In 2021, Pastorelli was promoted to McGowan's chief of staff, and after McGowan's resignation in 2023 and replacement with Roger Cook, Pastorelli became Cook's chief of staff.

Previously factionally unaligned, Pastorelli joined Labor's Right faction in early 2024. WA Labor president Lorna Clarke was speculated as the most likely candidate to replace Landsdale MP Margaret Quirk, who was expected to retire, until Pastorelli joined the Right faction, the same faction as Quirk and Clarke, which in addition to him living with the electoral district and being close to Cook and Deputy Premier Saffioti, made him Quirk's most likely replacement. In April 2024, Quirk announced that she would not contest the 2025 state election. Later that month, Pastorelli was preselected to be the Labor Party's candidate for Landsdale.

From the end of January 2025, Pastorelli took extended leave from his job as chief of staff to campaign for Landsdale. Liberal candidate for Churchlands and Perth Lord Mayor Basil Zempilas demanded that Pastorelli's leave forms be made public, which Cook declined, instead showing them to the media. During the election campaign, one of Pastorelli's posts on Twitter in 2011 resurfaced, in which he said "Who the f... is this old hag on sunrise throwing dirt on our PM!??". When asked about the post, Pastorelli apologised. Pastorelli was elected with a majority on first preferences, beating City of Wanneroo councillor and Liberal candidate Marizane Moore. He was replaced as Cook's chief of staff by Daniel Smith.

Following the 2025 state election, Pastorelli was appointed parliamentary secretary to the premier, a role seen as a precursor to being appointed to cabinet. After the resignation of Paul Papalia in July 2026, Pastorelli was appointed to cabinet, with Premier Cook overruling the Left faction to appoint Pastorelli.

== Personal life ==
Pastorelli is married and has one son.

Western Australian Legislative Assembly
| Preceded by Margaret Quirk | Member for Landsdale; 8 March 2025 – present | Incumbent |
