= Adam Hort =

Western Australian politician

Adam Hort MLA
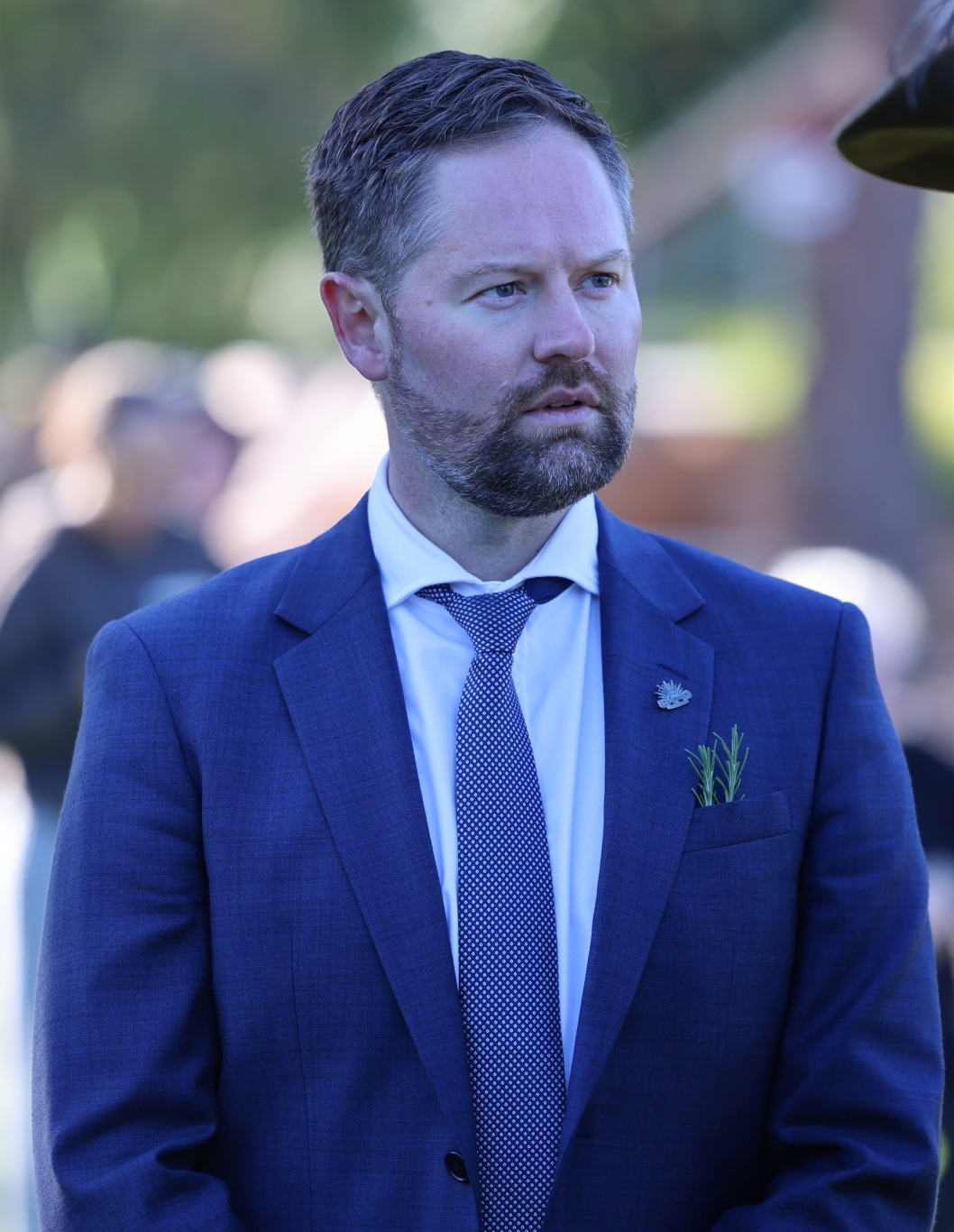

Member of the Western Australian Legislative Assembly for Kalamunda
- Incumbent
- Assumed office 8 March 2025
- Preceded by: Matthew Hughes

Deputy Mayor of the City of Gosnells
- In office 18 October 2021 – 26 June 2024
- Preceded by: Peter Abetz
- Succeeded by: Serena Williamson

Councillor for the City of Gosnells
- In office 21 October 2019 – 26 June 2024

Personal details
- Party: Liberal (since 2024)
- Profession: Pharmacist

Adam Luke Hort is an Australian politician and pharmacist, who is a member of the Western Australian Legislative Assembly representing the electoral district of Kalamunda for the Liberal Party. Hort won his seat at the 2025 Western Australian state election in a very close contest—initial counting showed Hort winning the seat by 83 votes, with the small margin triggering an automatic recount which confirmed his victory over Labor's Karen Beale by a final 82 votes.

Hort was previously elected to the City of Gosnells council on 21 October 2019, and was its Deputy Mayor from 21 October 2021 until his resignation on 26 June 2024.

Western Australian Legislative Assembly
Preceded by Matthew Hughes	Member for Kalamunda; 2025–present	Incumbent
