= 2025 Western Australian state election =

- 8 March 2025

All 59 seats in the Western Australian Legislative Assembly and all 37 members in the Western Australian Legislative Council 30 Assembly seats are needed for a majority
- Opinion polls
- Turnout: 1,868,946 (85.45%) ▼0.01%
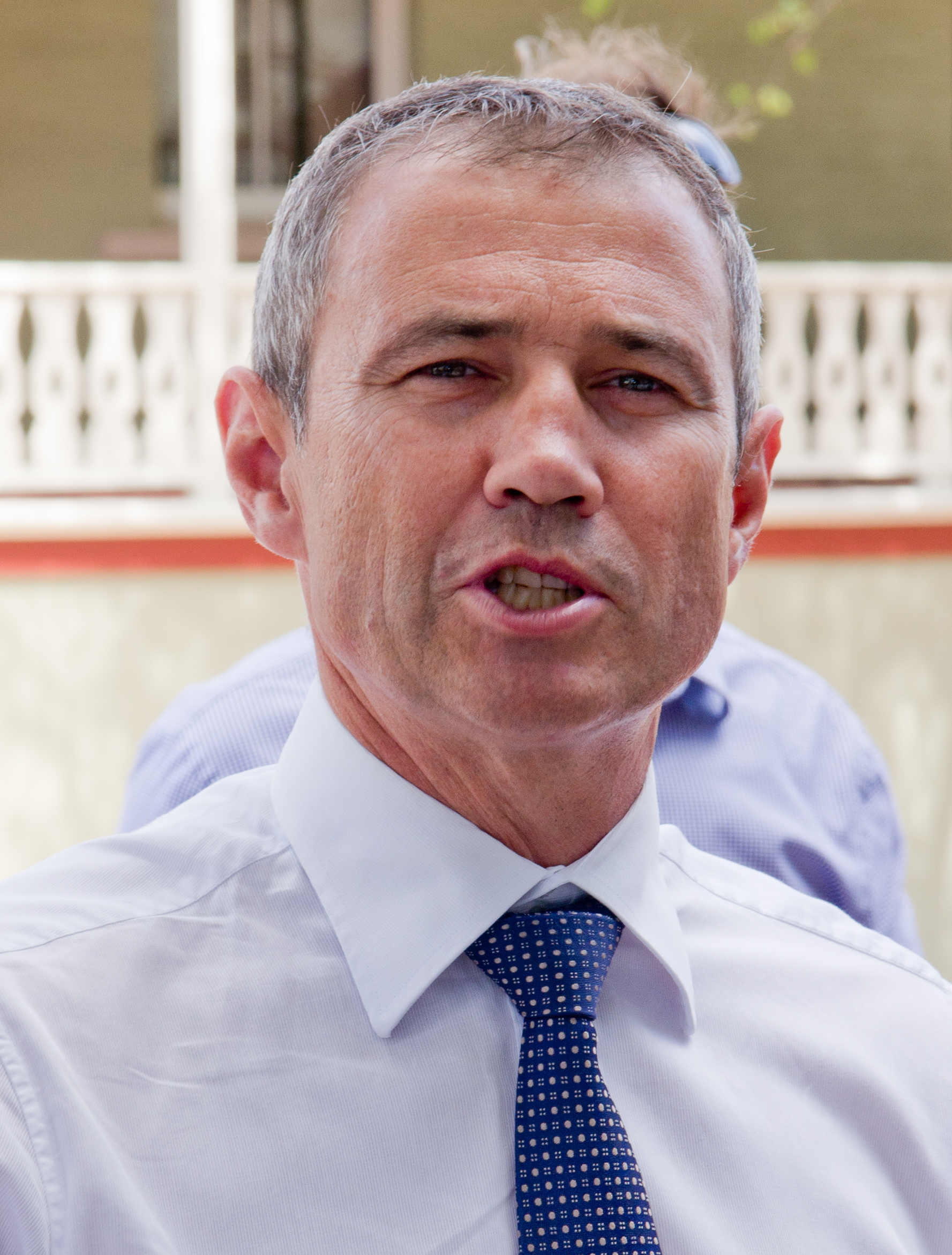

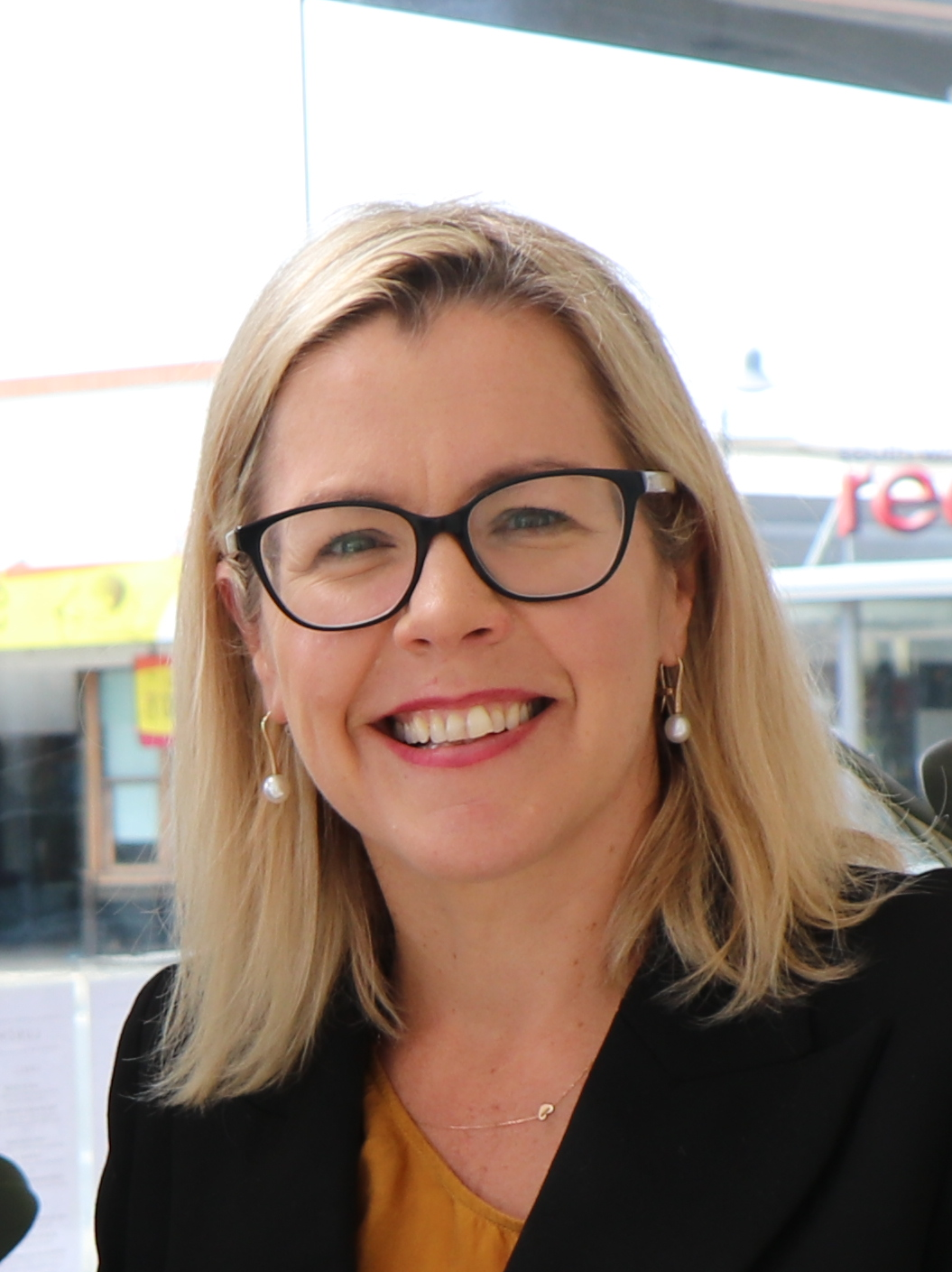

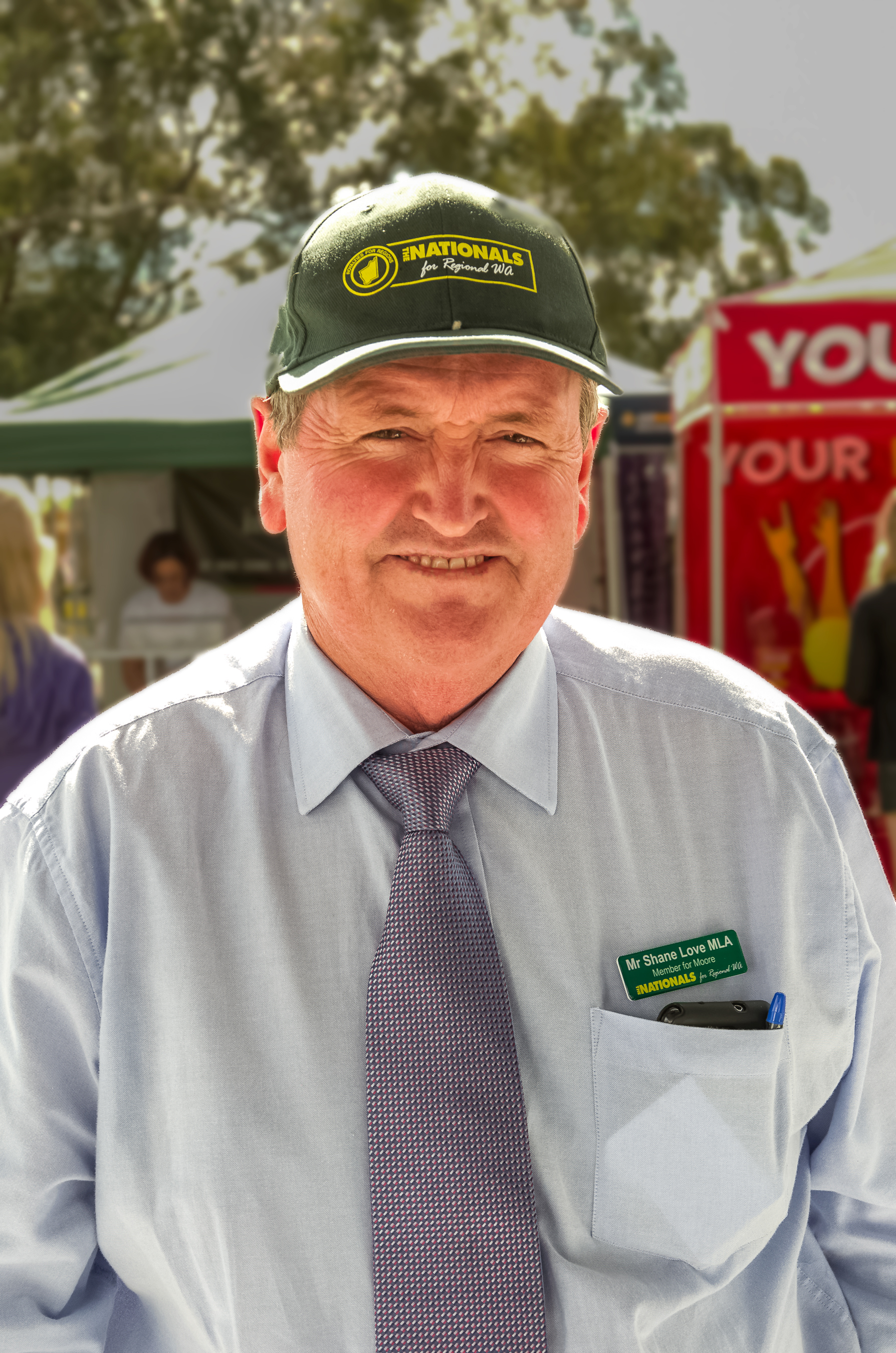
	First party	Second party	Third party
Leader	Roger Cook	Libby Mettam	Shane Love
Party	Labor	Liberal	National
Leader since	6 June 2023	30 January 2023	30 January 2023
Leader's seat	Kwinana	Vasse	Moore (won Mid-West)
Last election	53 seats, 59.92%	2 seats, 21.30%	4 seats, 4.00%
Seats before	53	3 (Note: In late October 2023, Merome Beard, National MP for the rural electorate of North West Central, defected to the Liberal Party.)	3
Seats won	46	7	6
Seat change	▼7	▲4	▲3
Primary vote	633,093	428,105	78,753
Percentage	41.4%	28.0%	5.2%
Swing	▼18.5	▲6.7	▲1.2
TPP	57.1%	42.9%
TPP swing	▼12.5	▲12.5
- Current leading margin by electorate
Premier before election
Roger Cook
Labor
Subsequent Premier
Roger Cook
Labor

The 2025 Western Australian state election was held on 8 March 2025 to elect members to the Parliament of Western Australia, where all 59 seats in the Legislative Assembly and all 37 seats in the Legislative Council were up for election.

The Labor government, led by Premier Roger Cook, won a third consecutive four-year term in a landslide, becoming the first party to win a third term in Western Australia since 1989. Labor were challenged by the Liberal Party, led by Libby Mettam and by the National Party, led by Opposition Leader Shane Love.

The Nationals, who were the official opposition party in the 2021–2025 parliament, ceded opposition status to the Liberals. Despite being the Leader of the Opposition, Love was not presented as the alternative premier during the campaign, with the Nationals lacking sufficient support in opinion polls and Mettam participating in the election's leaders debate.

This was Labor's third consecutive landslide victory since winning government in 2017 and Labor's second best result after the previous 2021 state election. Labor won 46 seats in the lower house, a decrease of seven seats from their 2021 result. The Liberal Party won 7 seats while the National Party won 6, ensuring that the Liberals returned to official opposition status in the parliament. Labor's primary vote fell by over 18 points to 41.4%, while the Liberal vote increased by more than six and a half percent to 28% and the National vote was 5.2% (up 1.2%).

In the Legislative Council, Labor won 16 seats, the Liberals 10 and Nationals 2; while minor party the Greens won 4 seats. Other minor parties that earned representation in the Council include One Nation, who won 2 seats, as well as Legalise Cannabis, Australian Christians and the Animal Justice Party, who each claimed 1 seat.

Candidates were elected in single-member seats in the Legislative Assembly via full-preferential instant-runoff voting. In the Legislative Council, 37 candidates were elected using single transferable voting across the state, which functioned as a single electorate. Amendments made to electoral law had increased the size of the Legislative Council by one member at this election and also had abolished the former system of six regions of unequal population that each elected six members using single transferable voting.

== Background ==
The 2021 state election saw Labor win one of the most comprehensive victories on record at the state or territory level in Australia. It won 53 of the 59 seats, surpassing its own record set four years earlier for the largest government majority and seat tally in Western Australian parliamentary history.

In May 2023, McGowan resigned the premiership, saying he was "exhausted".

Since the 2021 election, there have been two by-elections. North West Central elected a new member upon the resignation of Vince Catania. Rockingham also elected a new member after former premier Mark McGowan retired from politics. Labor retained this seat with their candidate Magenta Marshall. Merome Beard, the winner of the North West Central by-election defected from the National Party to the Liberal Party in October 2023 and stood as the Liberal Party's candidate in this election.

== Registered parties ==
The following parties were registered with the Western Australian Electoral Commission:

- Sustainable Australia Party – Anti-corruption
- Animal Justice Party
- Australian Christians
- Greens Western Australia
- Labor Party
- Legalise Cannabis Western Australia Party
- Liberal Party
- National Party of Australia
- Shooters, Fishers and Farmers Party
- Libertarian Party
- One Nation
- Stop Pedophiles! Protect kiddies!

== Electoral system ==
Members in the Legislative Assembly were elected to single-member seats via full-preferential instant-runoff voting. In the Legislative Council election, 37 members were elected across the state, which functions as a single electorate. They were elected using single transferable voting.

=== Legislative Council voting changes ===
In September 2021, the McGowan Labor Government introduced electoral reform legislation to change the electoral system of the Legislative Council. Under the system used in the 2021 election, put in place under the Gallop government, the state was divided into six regional electorates, each electing six members. Three of the regions were based in metropolitan Perth, and three in the regions; the regions were intentionally unequal in population; this system overrepresented the rural electoral regions; the Mining and Pastoral Region had one-sixth the population of the metropolitan regions, but elected the same six MLCs. The government first proposed abolishing the regions and replacing them with what it called a "one vote, one value" system.

Under the new system, 37 MLCs were elected on a single statewide ballot by single transferable vote (STV). This increased the size of the council by one seat. The controversial group voting tickets (GVTs) were abolished. GVTs were abolished for the Senate in 2016 and, at the time of this election, were only used for the Victorian Legislative Council. Votes were cast under a semi-optional preferential form of STV using above-the-line voting. It required electors to mark preferences for one or more preferred parties above the dividing line on the ballot paper, or at least 20 candidates below the dividing line. The legislation was passed by the state parliament on 17 November 2021 and received royal assent seven days thereafter.

The election of 37 MLCs in a single statewide constituency represented the largest district magnitude known in the history of the single transferable vote.

=== Redistribution ===
Electoral districts of the Western Australian Legislative Assembly for the 2021 state election
Electoral districts of the Western Australian Legislative Assembly for the 2025 state election

The Western Australian Electoral Commission conducted a redistribution of the boundaries of all 59 electoral districts. The final boundaries for the electoral districts were released on 1 December 2023.

The seats of Moore and North West Central were merged to create a new seat, Mid-West. The merger of two rural seats into one was matched by the creation of a new seat in Perth, Oakford, which covers growing suburbs between Armadale and the Kwinana Freeway.

According to psephologist Antony Green, the Coalition would need a combined swing of 23.4% to gain the 24 seats needed to form a majority government.

On the new boundaries, there were 17 seats with margins under 15%, which were regarded as "key seats". (Green described these as "marginal seats" due to the extent of Labor's landslide in 2021, as normally a margin of over 15% would be considered a safe seat.)

==== Changes to electorates of the Legislative Assembly ====
Current seat	2021 election			New seat	2023 redistribution		
Current seat	Party	Member	Margin	New seat	Party	Member	Margin*
Burns Beach	Labor	Mark Folkard	26.9	Mindarie	Labor	Notional	23.1
Mirrabooka	Labor	Meredith Hammat	33.7	Girrawheen	Labor	Notional	33.4
Moore	Nationals	Shane Love	8.5	Mid-West	Nationals	Notional	8.6
North-West Central	Nationals	Vince Catania	1.7	Mid-West	Nationals	Notional	8.6
New seat				Oakford	Labor	Notional	27.7
Warnbro	Labor	Paul Papalia	33.4	Secret Harbour	Labor	Notional	31.3
Willagee	Labor	Peter Tinley	27.1	Bibra Lake	Labor	Notional	28.2
*These margins are notional, being calculated by Antony Green to take account of the 2023 redistribution. As such, it may vary from the 2021 election results.

== Key dates ==
Elections are scheduled for the second Saturday of March every four years, in line with legislative changes made in 2011.

While the Legislative Assembly has fixed four-year terms, the Governor of Western Australia may still dissolve the Assembly and call an election early on the advice of the Premier.

Key dates of this election were:

Date	Event
3 January 2025	Postal vote applications open
13 February 2025	Last day to join the electoral roll, 6:00 PM
24 February 2025	Early voting opens
5 March 2025	Last day to apply for postal vote, 6:00 PM
8 March 2025	Election day, 8:00 AM – 6:00 PM
13 March 2025	Last day for postal votes to be returned, 9:00 PM

== Retiring MPs ==
=== Labor ===
- Lisa Baker MLA (Maylands) – announced 5 March 2024
- Sue Ellery MLC (South Metropolitan) – announced 29 July 2022
- Matthew Hughes MLA (Kalamunda) – announced 9 February 2024
- Bill Johnston MLA (Cannington) – announced 30 November 2023
- Kyle McGinn MLC (Mining and Pastoral) – announced 7 July 2024
- Simon Millman MLA (Mount Lawley) – announced 8 April 2024
- Martin Pritchard MLC (North Metropolitan) – announced 16 May 2024
- John Quigley MLA (Butler) – announced 19 February 2024
- Margaret Quirk MLA (Landsdale) – announced 2 April 2024
- Michelle Roberts MLA (Midland) – announced 16 October 2024
- Jessica Shaw MLA (Swan Hills) – announced 3 June 2024
- Sally Talbot MLC (South West) – announced 5 July 2024
- Chris Tallentire MLA (Thornlie) – announced 26 February 2024
- David Templeman MLA (Mandurah) – announced 17 September 2024
- Peter Tinley MLA (Willagee) – announced 14 March 2024
- Darren West MLC (Agricultural) – announced 8 June 2024

=== Liberal ===
- Peter Collier MLC (North Metropolitan) – did not nominate for endorsement
- Donna Faragher MLC (East Metropolitan) – announced 10 January 2024
- David Honey MLA (Cottesloe) – lost preselection 10 February 2024

=== National ===
- Martin Aldridge MLC (Agricultural) – announced 16 April 2024
- Mia Davies MLA (Central Wheatbelt) – announced 27 January 2023
- Colin de Grussa MLC (Agricultural) – announced 8 June 2024

=== Independent ===
- Wilson Tucker MLC (Mining and Pastoral) – announced 12 February 2025

== Results ==
The election was called for the incumbent Labor government just after 7:40pm Australian Western Standard Time (AWST).

=== Legislative Assembly ===
Results by electoral district as of 8 March (shaded by winning party). Labor Liberal National

Party	Votes	%	+/–	Seats	+/–
Labor	633,093	41.43	▼18.49	46	▼7
Liberal	428,105	28.02	▲6.71	7	▲5
Greens	169,007	11.06	▲4.14	0	0
National	78,753	5.15	▲1.16	6	▲2
One Nation	61,174	4.00	▲2.74	0	0
Independents	50,488	3.30	▲2.50	0	0
Australian Christians	48,407	3.17	▲1.69	0	0
Legalise Cannabis	37,864	2.48	▲2.12	0	0
Shooters, Fishers and Farmers	11,253	0.74	▲0.05	0	0
Animal Justice Party	6,878	0.45	▲0.45	0	0
Stop Pedophiles! Protect kiddies!	2,021	0.13	▲0.13	0	0
Libertarian	928	0.06	▲0.06	0	0
Total	1,527,971	100.00	–	59	–
Valid votes	1,527,971	95.68	▼0.56		
Invalid/blank votes	69,071	4.32	▲0.56		
Total votes	1,597,042	100.00	–		
Registered voters/turnout	1,868,946	85.45	▼0.01		

=== Legislative Council ===
Party	Votes	%	+/–	Seats	+/–
Labor	635,537	40.89	▼19.44	16	▼6
Liberal	422,655	27.20	▲9.52	10	▲3
Greens	170,052	10.94	▲4.56	4	▲3
National	84,203	5.42	▲2.62	2	▼1
One Nation	59,296	3.82	▲2.34	2	▲2
Legalise Cannabis	44,754	2.88	▲0.90	1	▼1
Australian Christians	41,348	2.66	▲0.71	1	▲1
Independents	20,795	1.34	▲1.34	0	0
Animal Justice Party	18,803	1.21	▲0.53	1	▲1
Sustainable Australia Party	16,732	1.08	▲0.77	0	0
Stop Pedophiles! Protect kiddies!	14,552	0.94	▲0.94	0	0
Shooters, Fishers and Farmers	13,010	0.84	▼0.64	0	0
Libertarian	9,912	0.64	0.00	0	0
Ungrouped Independents	2,458	0.16	▲0.16	0	0
Total	1,554,107	100.00	–	37	–
Valid votes	1,554,107	97.07	▼0.98		
Invalid/blank votes	46,860	2.93	▲0.98		
Total votes	1,600,967	100.00	–		
Registered voters/turnout	1,868,936	85.66	▲0.16		

=== Seats changing hands ===
Members in italics did not recontest their seats.

Seat	Pre-election			Swing	Post-election		
Seat	Party	Member	Margin	Swing	Margin	Member	Party
Albany	Labor	Rebecca Stephens	11.0	17.3	6.3	Scott Leary	National
Carine	Labor	Paul Lilburne	3.9	11.5	7.6	Liam Staltari	Liberal
Churchlands	Labor	Christine Tonkin	1.5	2.7	1.1	Basil Zempilas	Liberal
Geraldton	Labor	Lara Dalton	9.5	22.8	13.5	Kirrilee Warr	National
Kalamunda	Labor	Matthew Hughes	14.5	14.7	0.1	Adam Hort	Liberal
Murray-Wellington	Labor	Robyn Clarke	17.2	18.7	1.5	David Bolt	Liberal
Nedlands	Labor	Katrina Stratton	3.1	6.3	3.2	Jonathan Huston	Liberal
Warren-Blackwood	Labor	Jane Kelsbie	2.3	3.9	1.6	Bevan Eatts	National

== Electoral pendulums ==
=== Pre-election pendulum ===
This is a pre-election pendulum, taking into account the 2023 boundary redistribution. Estimated margins are calculated by Antony Green for the Western Australian Parliamentary Library. Retiring members are shown in italics.

Government seats
Marginal
Churchlands	Christine Tonkin	ALP	1.6
Warren-Blackwood	Jane Kelsbie	ALP v NAT	2.2
Nedlands	Katrina Stratton	ALP	3.1
Carine	Paul Lilburne	ALP	3.9
Fairly safe
Bateman	Kim Giddens	ALP	6.7
Geraldton	Lara Dalton	ALP v NAT	9.3
Scarborough	Stuart Aubrey	ALP	9.5
Safe
South Perth	Geoff Baker	ALP	10.1
Riverton	Jags Krishnan	ALP	10.9
Albany	Rebecca Stephens	ALP	11.0
Kalgoorlie	Ali Kent	ALP	11.2
Dawesville	Lisa Munday	ALP	13.1
Darling Range	Hugh Jones	ALP	14.1
Kalamunda	Matthew Hughes	ALP	14.5
Fremantle	Simone McGurk	ALP v GRN	15.7
Bicton	Lisa O'Malley	ALP	16.2
Kingsley	Jessica Stojkovski	ALP	16.9
Murray-Wellington	Robyn Clarke	ALP	17.3
Pilbara	Kevin Michel	ALP v NAT	17.6
Jandakot	vacant	ALP	18.2
Hillarys	Caitlin Collins	ALP	18.7
Very safe
Kimberley	Divina D'Anna	ALP	21.4
Mount Lawley	Simon Millman	ALP	21.9
Bunbury	Don Punch	ALP	22.5
Forrestfield	Stephen Price	ALP	22.9
Collie-Preston	Jodie Hanns	ALP	23.3
Mandurah	David Templeman	ALP	24.2
Joondalup	Emily Hamilton	ALP	25.5
Landsdale	Margaret Quirk	ALP	25.6
Balcatta	David Michael	ALP	25.8
Midland	Michelle Roberts	ALP	26.9
Swan Hills	Jessica Shaw	ALP	27.3
Oakford	Yaz Mubarakai	ALP	27.7
Victoria Park	Hannah Beazley	ALP	27.7
Mindarie	Mark Folkard	ALP	27.9
Morley	Amber-Jade Sanderson	ALP	27.9
Cockburn	David Scaife	ALP	28.1
Bibra Lake	Peter Tinley	ALP	28.2
Wanneroo	Sabine Winton	ALP	28.5
Perth	John Carey	ALP	29.2
Maylands	Lisa Baker	ALP	29.3
Belmont	Cassie Rowe	ALP	29.4
Thornlie	Chris Tallentire	ALP	30.6
Cannington	Bill Johnston	ALP	30.7
Secret Harbour	Paul Papalia	ALP	31.3
Bassendean	Dave Kelly	ALP	31.7
Butler	John Quigley	ALP	32.6
Southern River	Terry Healy	ALP	33.1
Girrawheen	Meredith Hammat	ALP	33.4
Armadale	Tony Buti	ALP	33.8
West Swan	Rita Saffioti	ALP	34.8
Baldivis	Reece Whitby	ALP	35.8
Rockingham	Magenta Marshall	ALP	37.7
Kwinana	Roger Cook	ALP	38.2

Non-government seats
Fairly safe
Mid-West	Shane Love	NAT	8.6
Central Wheatbelt	Mia Davies	NAT	9.3
Safe
Roe	Peter Rundle	NAT	12.2
Crossbench seats
Vasse	Libby Mettam	LIB	4.3
Cottesloe	David Honey	LIB	7.4

=== Post-election pendulum ===
Government seats
Marginal
Pilbara	Kevin Michel	ALP	0.6
Fremantle	Simone McGurk	ALP	0.8 v IND
Dawesville	Lisa Munday	ALP	1.3
Kalgoorlie	Ali Kent	ALP	1.6
South Perth	Geoff Baker	ALP	1.6
Bateman	Kim Giddens	ALP	3.3
Kingsley	Jessica Stojkovski	ALP	3.5
Forrestfield	Stephen Price	ALP	4.1
Riverton	Jags Krishnan	ALP	4.2
Collie-Preston	Jodie Hanns	ALP	4.3
Scarborough	Stuart Aubrey	ALP	5.0
Darling Range	Hugh Jones	ALP	5.1
Fairly safe
Joondalup	Emily Hamilton	ALP	6.3
Jandakot	Stephen Pratt	ALP	6.4
Bunbury	Don Punch	ALP	7.1
Swan Hills	Michelle Maynard	ALP	8.4
Bicton	Lisa O'Malley	ALP	9.3
Mandurah	Rhys Williams	ALP	9.5
Landsdale	Daniel Pastorelli	ALP	9.6
Safe
Hillarys	Caitlin Collins	ALP	10.1
Mount Lawley	Frank Paolino	ALP	10.7
Midland	Steve Catania	ALP	10.9
Mindarie	Mark Folkard	ALP	11.3
Secret Harbour	Paul Papalia	ALP	11.5
Rockingham	Magenta Marshall	ALP	11.8
Oakford	Yaz Mubarakai	ALP	11.9
Morley	Amber-Jade Sanderson	ALP	12.0
Wanneroo	Sabine Winton	ALP	12.5
Kimberley	Divina D'Anna	ALP	14.0
Thornlie	Colleen Egan	ALP	14.0 v IND
Bibra Lake	Sook Yee Lai	ALP	14.2 v GRN
Balcatta	David Michael	ALP	14.5
Butler	Lorna Clarke	ALP	14.7
Bassendean	Dave Kelly	ALP	15.7 v IND
Victoria Park	Hannah Beazley	ALP	16.7
Baldivis	Reece Whitby	ALP	16.7
Cockburn	David Scaife	ALP	17.8
Cannington	Ron Sao	ALP	17.9
Armadale	Tony Buti	ALP	18.9
Belmont	Cassie Rowe	ALP	19.4
Very safe
Perth	John Carey	ALP	21.0
West Swan	Rita Saffioti	ALP	21.2
Girrawheen	Meredith Hammat	ALP	21.3
Maylands	Dan Bull	ALP	22.5
Southern River	Terry Healy	ALP	23.4
Kwinana	Roger Cook	ALP	25.0

Non-government seats
Marginal
Kalamunda	Adam Hort	LIB	0.1
Churchlands	Basil Zempilas	LIB	1.1
Murray-Wellington	David Bolt	LIB	1.7
Nedlands	Jonathan Huston	LIB	2.7
Cottesloe	Sandra Brewer	LIB	5.6 v IND
Fairly safe
Carine	Liam Staltari	LIB	7.6
Safe
Vasse	Libby Mettam	LIB	13.4
Crossbench seats
Warren-Blackwood	Bevan Eatts	NAT	1.8
Albany	Scott Leary	NAT	6.3
Mid-West	Shane Love	NAT	13.7 v LIB
Geraldton	Kirrilee Warr	NAT	14.1
Central Wheatbelt	Lachlan Hunter	NAT	23.3
Roe	Peter Rundle	NAT	25.1 v LIB

== Opinion polling ==
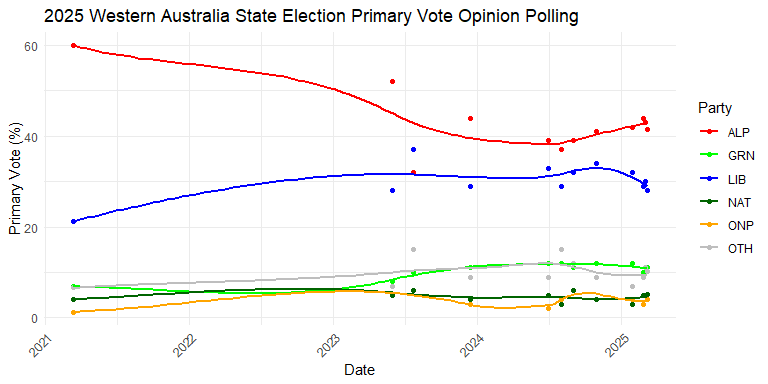
Primary vote opinion polling for the Western Australian 2025 election with a local regression (LOESS) trendline for each party.

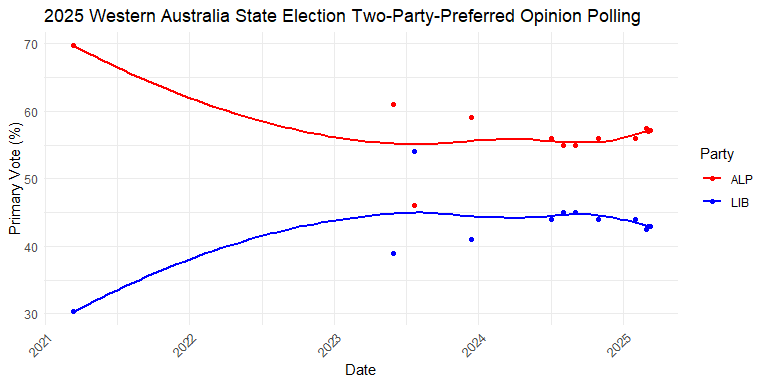
Two-party-preferred opinion polling for the Western Australian 2025 election with a local regression (LOESS) trendline for each party.

=== Voting intention ===
Legislative Assembly (lower house) polling
Date	Firm	Sample	Primary vote						TPP vote
Date	Firm	Sample	ALP	LIB	NAT	GRN	ONP	OTH	ALP	LIB
8 March 2025 election		N/A	41.4%	28.0%	5.2%	11.1%	4.0%	10.3%	57.1%	42.9%
4 – 5 March 2025	Demos AU	1126	43%	30%	5%	11%	—N/a	11%	57%	43%
27 February – 5 March 2025	Newspoll	1061	44%	29%	5%	10%	3%	9%	57.5%	42.5%
29 January – 4 February 2025	Newspoll	1039	42%	32%	3%	12%	4%	7%	56%	44%
30 October – 4 November 2024	Demos AU	948	41%	34%	4%	12%	—N/a	9%	56%	44%
September 2024	Freshwater	1045	39%	32%	6%	11%	—N/a	12%	55%	45%
August 2024	Wolf & Smith	878	37%	29%	3%	12%	4%	15%	55%	45%
July 2024	Freshwater	1000	39%	33%	5%	12%	2%	9%	56%	44%
14 December 2023	Redbridge	1200	44%	29%	4%	11%	3%	9%	59%	41%
23 July 2023	Utting Research	1000	32%	37%	6%	10%	—N/a	15%	46%	54%
31 May 2023	Utting Research	800	52%	28%	5%	8%	—N/a	7%	61%	39%
13 March 2021 election		N/A	59.9%	21.3%	4.0%	6.9%	1.3%	6.6%	69.7%	30.3%

=== Preferred Premier ===
Date	Firm	Sample	Preferred Premier		
Date	Firm	Sample	Cook	Mettam	Don't know
4 – 5 March 2025	Demos AU	1126	47%	32%	21%
27 February – 5 March 2025	Newspoll	1061	53%	34%	13%
29 January – 4 February 2025	Newspoll	1039	54%	34%	12%
30 October – 4 November 2024	Demos AU	948	42%	29%	29%
September 2024	Freshwater	1045	46%	34%	20%
31 May 2023	Utting Research	800	50%	24%	26%

=== Satisfaction ratings ===
Date	Firm	Sample	Cook				Mettam			
Date	Firm	Sample	Satisfied	Dissatisfied	Don't know	Net	Satisfied	Dissatisfied	Don't know	Net
27 February – 5 March 2025	Newspoll	1061	55%	38%	7%	+17%	43%	42%	15%	+1%
29 January – 4 February 2025	Newspoll	1039	55%	37%	8%	+18%	39%	41%	20%	–2%
23 July 2023	Utting Research	1000	27%	37%	36%	–10%	31%	24%	45%	+7%
31 May 2023	Utting Research	800	42%	26%	32%	+16%	31%	33%	36%	–2%
Date	Firm	Sample	McGowan				Mettam			
Date	Firm	Sample	Satisfied	Dissatisfied	Don't know	Net	Satisfied	Dissatisfied	Don't know	Net
11 Mar 2023	Painted Dog Research	1052	63%	24%	13%	+39%	24%	18%	58%	+6%
Date	Firm	Sample	McGowan				Honey			
Date	Firm	Sample	Satisfied	Dissatisfied	Don't know	Net	Satisfied	Dissatisfied	Don't know	Net
19–21 Oct 2022	Painted Dog Research	637	70%	18%	12%	+52%	9%	31%	60%	–22%
