= Legalise Cannabis Western Australia Party =

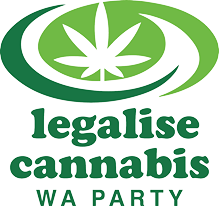
- Abbreviation: LCWA
- Leader: Brian Walker
- President: Fred Mulholland
- Secretary: Aaron Cross
- Founded: June 2020
- Ideology: Legalisation of cannabis
- National affiliation: Legalise Cannabis Australia
- Legislative Council: 1 / 36
- Rockingham City Council: 1 / 13

Website
- www.lcwaparty.org.au

The Legalise Cannabis Western Australia Party (LCWA) is a political party registered in Western Australia. The party advocates for law reform in relation to cannabis. Since 2024, it has been led by Brian Walker, a member of the Legislative Council.

== History ==
The LCWA party is the sister party of Legalise Cannabis Queensland (LCQ) and affiliate of the Help End Marijuana Prohibition Party (HEMP) and Medical Cannabis Users Association of Australia (MCUA).

Following in the success of LCQ in the 2020 Queensland state election, the party was registered by the Western Australian Electoral Commission on 29 January 2021 to contest the 2021 Western Australian state election, at which two of its candidates – Brian Walker in the East Metropolitan Region and Sophia Moermond in the South-West Region – were elected to the Western Australian Legislative Council.

In January 2022, the party proposed that each West Australian should be allowed to possess 50 g (1.8 oz) of marijuana and grow four marijuana plants. This was rejected by Mark McGowan, the premier of Western Australia.

== Electoral results ==
The party fielded candidates for the first time in the 2021 Western Australian state election and received two seats in the Legislative Council with the fifth largest number of votes (26,818) by party behind the Nationals. The party fielded a limited number of candidates in the Legislative Assembly and received 4,996 votes.

In the 2023 Rockingham state by-election the party received its highest percentage vote in its history, reaching 6.80% of votes (1,487 votes total) and beating the Greens candidate at the election; this made the LCWA the third most popular party at the election.

== Sophia Moermond ==
A former representative of the party, Sophia Moermond, described vaccination mandates as "medical apartheid" and has denied the science behind the vaccines. She was additionally suspended from parliament for refusing to get vaccinated in 2022.

Moermond also gained controversy for speaking at a rally outside the Parliament of Western Australia in March 2023. Moermond's speech, later posted on her Facebook, said she was "concerned about the rejection of science for ideology" in relation to transgender issues. The rally was in support of, and attended by, anti-transgender activist Kellie-Jay Keen-Minshull.

These comments were later disowned by the only other West Australian Legalise Cannabis MP, Dr Brian Walker, with him calling them transphobic and stating they were not a part of the party. The two Victorian Legislative Council Legalise Cannabis MPs released a joint statement stating that Moermond's comments were not representative of the broader party "or its representatives."

On 9 May 2024, Moermond left the Legalise Cannabis Western Australia Party to sit as an independent.

== See also ==
- Help End Marijuana Prohibition (HEMP) Party
- Legalise Cannabis Queensland Party
- Cannabis in Australia
- Drug policy reform
