= Electoral results for the district of Geraldton =

Western Australian district election results

This is a list of electoral results for the electoral district of Geraldton in Western Australian state elections.

== Members for Geraldton ==
Member	Party	Term
Edward Vivien Harvey Keane	Non-aligned	1890–1891
George Simpson	Opposition	1891–1899
Richard Robson	Independent	1899–1900
Robert Hutchinson	Opposition	1900–1904
Henry Carson	Ministerial	1904–1906
Thomas Brown	Labor	1906–1908
Henry Carson	Ministerial	1908–1911
Bronte Dooley	Labor	1911–1913
Samuel Elliott	Liberal (WA)	1913–1914
Edward Heitmann	Labor	1914–1917
Edward Heitmann	National Labor	1917
Samuel Elliott	Liberal (WA)	1917
John Willcock	Labor	1917–1947
Edmund Hall	Country	1947–1950
Bill Sewell	Labor	1950–1974
Jeff Carr	Labor	1974–1991
Bob Bloffwitch	Liberal	1991–2001
Shane Hill	Labor	2001–2008
Ian Blayney	Liberal	2008–2021
Lara Dalton	Labor	2021–2025
Kirrilee Warr	National	2025–present

== Election results ==
=== Elections in the 2020s ===
2025 Western Australian state election: Geraldton
Party	Candidate	Votes	%	±%
National	Kirrilee Warr	7,452	28.4	+1.8
Labor	Lara Dalton	6,390	24.3	−28.0
Independent	Shane van Styn	5,339	20.3	+20.3
Liberal	Tim Milnes	4,212	16.0	+3.3
Greens	Madeline Doncon	994	3.8	+1.2
Legalise Cannabis	David Van Beek	594	2.3	+2.3
Christians	Eugenie Harris	571	2.2	+2.2
Independent	Aaron Horsman	468	1.8	+1.8
Shooters, Fishers, Farmers	Jack Ostle	241	0.9	−1.1
Total formal votes		26,261	96.0	−0.5
Informal votes		1,090	4.0	+0.5
Turnout		27,351	82.9	+3.7
Two-candidate-preferred result
National	Kirrilee Warr	16,812	64.1	+64.1
Labor	Lara Dalton	9,414	35.9	−23.4
National gain from Labor				

2021 Western Australian state election: Geraldton
Party	Candidate	Votes	%	±%
Labor	Lara Dalton	11,676	54.7	+21.0
National	Ian Blayney	5,222	24.5	+7.0
Liberal	Rob Dines	2,750	12.9	−14.8
Greens	Matt Roberts	536	2.5	−1.5
Shooters, Fishers, Farmers	Chris Mellon	380	1.8	−2.0
One Nation	Bruce Davies	336	1.6	−7.9
No Mandatory Vaccination	Mark Long	248	1.2	+1.2
WAxit	Bey Bey Kung	127	0.6	+0.6
Liberal Democrats	Andrew Genovese	77	0.4	+0.4
Total formal votes		21,352	96.6	+0.9
Informal votes		746	3.4	−0.9
Turnout		22,098	82.6	−2.1
Two-candidate-preferred result
Labor	Lara Dalton	13,170	61.7	+13.0
National	Ian Blayney	8,173	38.3	−13.0
Labor gain from National		Swing	+13.0	

=== Elections in the 2010s ===
2017 Western Australian state election: Geraldton
Party	Candidate	Votes	%	±%
Labor	Lara Dalton	7,071	33.7	+16.6
Liberal	Ian Blayney	5,808	27.7	−19.9
National	Paul Brown	3,669	17.5	−8.9
One Nation	Wayne Martin	1,979	9.4	+9.4
Greens	Paul Connolly	849	4.0	−2.4
Shooters, Fishers, Farmers	David Caudwell	791	3.8	+3.8
Christians	Greg Hall	413	2.0	−0.5
Independent	Victor Tanti	394	1.9	+1.9
Total formal votes		20,974	95.7	+1.4
Informal votes		937	4.3	−1.4
Turnout		21,911	85.5	−2.5
Two-party-preferred result
Liberal	Ian Blayney	10,759	51.3	−21.5
Labor	Lara Dalton	10,201	48.7	+48.7
Liberal hold		Swing	−21.5	

2013 Western Australian state election: Geraldton
Party	Candidate	Votes	%	±%
Liberal	Ian Blayney	9,167	47.6	+10.7
National	Shane Van Styn	5,081	26.4	+7.1
Labor	Kathryn Mannion	3,299	17.1	–12.0
Greens	Paul Connolly	1,239	6.4	+0.7
Christians	Carmen Burdett	469	2.4	–0.6
Total formal votes		19,255	94.3	–1.3
Informal votes		1,161	5.7	+1.3
Turnout		20,416	89.7	
Two-party-preferred result
Liberal	Ian Blayney	14,013	72.8	+14.3
Labor	Kathryn Mannion	5,223	27.2	–14.3
Two-candidate-preferred result
Liberal	Ian Blayney	11,711	60.9	+2.4
National	Shane Van Styn	7,517	39.1	+39.1
Liberal hold		Swing	+2.4	

=== Elections in the 2000s ===
2008 Western Australian state election: Geraldton
Party	Candidate	Votes	%	±%
Liberal	Ian Blayney	6,616	36.9	−2.0
Labor	Shane Hill	5,213	29.1	−9.4
National	Andrew Short	3,460	19.3	+9.0
Family First	Jane Foreman	1,036	5.8	+5.8
Greens	Adam Volkerts	1,030	5.8	+0.8
Christian Democrats	Philip Sprigg	551	3.1	−0.4
Total formal votes		17,906	95.7	+0.4
Informal votes		812	4.3	−0.4
Turnout		18,718	87.5	
Two-party-preferred result
Liberal	Ian Blayney	10,467	58.5	+5.0
Labor	Shane Hill	7,420	41.5	−5.0
Liberal hold		Swing	+5.0	

2005 Western Australian state election: Geraldton
Party	Candidate	Votes	%	±%
Labor	Shane Hill	5,252	44.5	+17.8
Liberal	Kevin Giudice	4,603	39.0	+12.8
Greens	Paul Connolly	581	4.9	+4.9
National	Sally Bennison	542	4.6	−4.4
Christian Democrats	Mac Forsyth	430	3.6	+3.6
One Nation	Ross Paravicini	375	3.2	−18.6
Citizens Electoral Council	Basil Atkins	29	0.2	+0.2
Total formal votes		11,812	94.8	−0.7
Informal votes		642	5.2	+0.7
Turnout		12,454	88.0	
Two-party-preferred result
Labor	Shane Hill	6,117	52.1	−0.6
Liberal	Kevin Giudice	5,627	47.9	+0.6
Labor hold		Swing	−0.6	

2001 Western Australian state election: Geraldton
Party	Candidate	Votes	%	±%
Labor	Shane Hill	2,705	26.8	−8.2
Liberal	Bob Bloffwitch	2,469	24.5	−25.8
One Nation	Ross Paravicini	2,121	21.0	+21.0
Independent	Jackie Healy	1,298	12.9	+12.9
National	Brendin Flanigan	935	9.3	+9.3
Independent	Ron Ashplant	295	2.9	+2.9
Independent	Michael Walton	107	1.1	+1.1
Independent	Mark Douglas	79	0.8	+0.8
Independent	Don Rolston	61	0.6	+0.6
Independent	Noel Sharp	19	0.2	+0.2
Independent	Stephen Gyorgy	8	0.1	+0.1
Total formal votes		10,097	95.4	−0.7
Informal votes		489	4.6	+0.7
Turnout		10,586	89.7	
Two-party-preferred result
Labor	Shane Hill	5,393	54.3	+11.3
Liberal	Bob Bloffwitch	4,538	45.7	−11.3
Labor gain from Liberal		Swing	+11.3	

=== Elections in the 1990s ===
1996 Western Australian state election: Geraldton
Party	Candidate	Votes	%	±%
Liberal	Bob Bloffwitch	5,237	50.3	+9.6
Labor	Laurie Graham	3,641	35.0	+1.3
Independent	Tony Cogan	1,194	11.5	+11.5
Democrats	Stephan Gyorgy	330	3.2	+3.2
Total formal votes		10,402	96.0	−0.5
Informal votes		428	4.0	+0.5
Turnout		10,830	88.2	
Two-party-preferred result
Liberal	Bob Bloffwitch	5,912	57.0	−2.8
Labor	Laurie Graham	4,468	43.0	+2.8
Liberal hold		Swing	−2.8	

1993 Western Australian state election: Geraldton
Party	Candidate	Votes	%	±%
Liberal	Bob Bloffwitch	4,293	40.3	−3.2
Labor	Gary Evershed	3,593	33.8	−13.8
National	Malcolm Short	2,402	22.6	+22.6
Independent	William Tomson	359	3.4	+3.4
Total formal votes		10,647	96.5	+2.5
Informal votes		381	3.5	−2.5
Turnout		11,028	94.2	+3.4
Two-party-preferred result
Liberal	Bob Bloffwitch	6,350	59.6	+9.8
Labor	Gary Evershed	4,297	40.4	−9.8
Liberal gain from Labor		Swing	+9.8	

1991 Geraldton state by-election
Party	Candidate	Votes	%	±%
Liberal	Bob Bloffwitch	4,446	45.5	+2.0
National	Malcolm Short	2,054	21.0	+21.0
Labor	Dianne Spowart	1,620	16.6	−31.0
Independent	Faye Simpson	471	4.8	+4.8
Independent	Helena Shields	315	3.2	+3.2
Independent	Albert Lenane	286	2.9	+2.9
Independent	Kenneth Gallaher	165	1.7	+1.7
Grey Power	Jason Meotti	146	1.5	−7.4
Independent	Bruce Burges	144	1.5	+1.5
Independent	Arthur Davies	67	0.7	+0.7
Independent	William Thomson	57	0.6	+0.6
Total formal votes		9,771	94.5	+0.5
Informal votes		566	5.5	−0.5
Turnout		10,337	86.8	−4.0
Two-candidate-preferred result
Liberal	Bob Bloffwitch	5,024	51.4	+1.6
National	Malcolm Short	4,747	48.6	+48.6
Liberal gain from Labor		Swing	N/A	

=== Elections in the 1980s ===
1989 Western Australian state election: Geraldton
Party	Candidate	Votes	%	±%
Labor	Jeff Carr	4,767	47.6	−2.8
Liberal	Victor McCabe	4,361	43.5	−6.1
Grey Power	Mary Gould	889	8.9	+8.9
Total formal votes		10,017	94.0	
Informal votes		644	6.0	
Turnout		10,661	90.8	
Two-party-preferred result
Labor	Jeff Carr	5,032	50.2	−0.2
Liberal	Victor McCabe	4,985	49.8	+0.2
Labor hold		Swing	−0.2	

1986 Western Australian state election: Geraldton
Party	Candidate	Votes	%	±%
Labor	Jeff Carr	4,676	50.4	−12.7
Liberal	Marjorie Tubby	4,609	49.6	+12.7
Total formal votes		9,285	97.7	−0.4
Informal votes		216	2.3	+0.4
Turnout		9,501	91.4	+2.6
Labor hold		Swing	−12.7	

1983 Western Australian state election: Geraldton
Party	Candidate	Votes	%	±%
Labor	Jeff Carr	5,324	63.1	
Liberal	Harold Driscoll	3,116	36.9	
Total formal votes		8,440	98.1	
Informal votes		162	1.9	
Turnout		8,602	88.8	
Labor hold		Swing		

1980 Western Australian state election: Geraldton
Party	Candidate	Votes	%	±%
Labor	Jeff Carr	4,654	58.7	+4.4
Liberal	Joseph Ricupero	2,994	37.8	−2.8
Progress	Paul Galbraith	279	3.5	−1.6
Total formal votes		7,927	97.5	−0.5
Informal votes		207	2.5	+0.5
Turnout		8,134	89.5	−1.7
Two-party-preferred result
Labor	Jeff Carr	4,738	59.8	+4.2
Liberal	Joseph Ricupero	3,189	40.2	−4.2
Labor hold		Swing	+4.2	

=== Elections in the 1970s ===
1977 Western Australian state election: Geraldton
Party	Candidate	Votes	%	±%
Labor	Jeff Carr	4,157	54.3	
Liberal	John Grosse	3,104	40.6	
Progress	Fiona Ensor	392	5.1	
Total formal votes		7,653	98.0	
Informal votes		157	2.0	
Turnout		7,810	91.2	
Two-party-preferred result
Labor	Jeff Carr	4,255	55.6	
Liberal	John Grosse	3,398	44.4	
Labor hold		Swing		

1974 Western Australian state election: Geraldton
Party	Candidate	Votes	%	±%
Labor	Jeff Carr	3,318	47.5	
Liberal	Joseph Willoughby	2,236	32.0	
Independent	Phillip Cooper	997	14.3	
National Alliance	Victor Askew	431	6.2	
Total formal votes		6,982	96.9	
Informal votes		224	3.1	
Turnout		7,206	89.6	
Two-party-preferred result
Labor	Jeff Carr	3,862	55.3	
Liberal	Joseph Willoughby	3,120	44.7	
Labor hold		Swing		

1971 Western Australian state election: Geraldton
Party	Candidate	Votes	%	±%
Labor	Bill Sewell	3,801	56.1	−0.1
Liberal	Ron Hamilton	2,263	33.4	−10.4
Democratic Labor	Lawrence Eaton	443	6.5	+6.5
Independent	Joyce Webber	269	4.0	+4.0
Total formal votes		6,776	95.7	−3.2
Informal votes		305	4.3	+3.2
Turnout		7,081	91.9	+1.1
Two-party-preferred result
Labor	Bill Sewell	3,948	58.3	+2.1
Liberal	Ron Hamilton	2,828	41.7	−2.1
Labor hold		Swing	+2.1	

=== Elections in the 1960s ===
1968 Western Australian state election: Geraldton
Party	Candidate	Votes	%	±%
Labor	Bill Sewell	3,103	56.2	
Liberal and Country	Phillip Cooper	2,423	43.8	
Total formal votes		5,526	98.9	
Informal votes		60	1.1	
Turnout		5,586	90.8	
Labor hold		Swing		

1965 Western Australian state election: Geraldton
Party	Candidate	Votes	%	±%
Labor	Bill Sewell	2,948	52.4	0.0
Liberal and Country	Charles Raynor	2,450	43.6	+43.6
Independent	Raymond Goss	224	4.0	+4.0
Total formal votes		5,622	97.4	−1.7
Informal votes		147	2.6	+1.7
Turnout		5,769	93.4	−0.4
Two-party-preferred result
Labor	Bill Sewell	2,982	53.0	−2.5
Liberal and Country	Charles Raynor	2,640	47.0	+47.0
Labor hold		Swing	−2.5	

1962 Western Australian state election: Geraldton
Party	Candidate	Votes	%	±%
Labor	Bill Sewell	2,750	52.4	
Independent	Charles Eadon-Clarke	2,338	44.6	
Independent	John Porteus	158	3.0	
Total formal votes		5,246	99.1	
Informal votes		45	0.9	
Turnout		5,291	93.0	
Two-candidate-preferred result
Labor	Bill Sewell		55.0	
Independent	Charles Eadon-Clarke		45.0	
Labor hold		Swing		

- Two candidate preferred vote was estimated.

=== Elections in the 1950s ===
1959 Western Australian state election: Geraldton
Party	Candidate	Votes	%	±%
Labor	Bill Sewell	3,257	59.9	0.0
Liberal and Country	Gerald Throssell	1,778	32.7	+12.8
Democratic Labor	Septimus Waldon	399	7.3	+7.3
Total formal votes		5,434	99.1	+0.5
Informal votes		50	0.9	−0.5
Turnout		5,484	91.3	−0.4
Two-party-preferred result
Labor	Bill Sewell		61.0	−1.2
Liberal and Country	Gerald Throssell		39.0	+1.2
Labor hold		Swing	−1.2	

- Two party preferred vote was estimated.

1956 Western Australian state election: Geraldton
Party	Candidate	Votes	%	±%
Labor	Bill Sewell	3,052	59.9	
Liberal and Country	Arnold Devlin	1,014	19.9	
Country	Charles Eadon-Clarke	995	19.5	
Independent	Joyce Webber	33	0.7	
Total formal votes		5,094	98.6	
Informal votes		71	1.4	
Turnout		5,165	91.7	
Two-party-preferred result
Labor	Bill Sewell		62.2	
Liberal and Country	Arnold Devlin		37.8	
Labor hold		Swing		

- Two party preferred vote was estimated.

1953 Western Australian state election: Geraldton
Party	Candidate	Votes	%	±%
Labor	Bill Sewell	3,011	61.9	+11.2
Liberal and Country	James McAleer	1,127	23.2	+23.2
Liberal and Country	Samuel Davey	593	12.2	+12.2
Independent	Joyce Webber	131	2.7	+2.7
Total formal votes		4,862	98.2	−0.7
Informal votes		90	1.8	+0.7
Turnout		4,952	93.8	+3.4
Two-party-preferred result
Labor	Bill Sewell		64.5	+13.8
Liberal and Country	James McAleer		35.5	+35.5
Labor hold		Swing	+13.8	

- Two party preferred vote was estimated.

1950 Western Australian state election: Geraldton
Party	Candidate	Votes	%	±%
Labor	Bill Sewell	2,287	50.7	
Country	Edmund Hall	2,227	49.3	
Total formal votes		4,514	98.9	
Informal votes		50	1.1	
Turnout		4,564	90.4	
Labor gain from Country		Swing		

=== Elections in the 1940s ===
1947 Western Australian state election: Geraldton
Party	Candidate	Votes	%	±%
Labor	Bill Sewell	1,874	47.7	−22.7
Country	Edmund Hall	1,154	29.4	+29.4
Liberal	Harold Daffen	903	23.0	+23.0
Total formal votes		3,931	99.2	+1.2
Informal votes		32	0.8	−1.2
Turnout		3,963	87.7	+0.9
Two-party-preferred result
Country	Edmund Hall	1,971	50.1	+50.1
Labor	Bill Sewell	1,960	49.9	−20.5
Country gain from Labor		Swing	N/A	

1943 Western Australian state election: Geraldton
Party	Candidate	Votes	%	±%
Labor	John Willcock	2,404	70.4	+15.4
Independent	John Bedwell	1,013	29.6	+29.6
Total formal votes		3,417	98.0	−1.1
Informal votes		70	2.0	+1.1
Turnout		3,487	86.8	−6.7
Labor hold		Swing	N/A	

=== Elections in the 1930s ===
1939 Western Australian state election: Geraldton
Party	Candidate	Votes	%	±%
Labor	John Willcock	2,075	55.0	−5.6
Country	Alfred Culewis	1,389	36.8	−2.6
Nationalist	Patrick Lynch	309	8.2	+8.2
Total formal votes		3,773	99.1	−0.3
Informal votes		33	0.9	+0.3
Turnout		3,806	93.5	+13.1
Labor hold		Swing	N/A	

1936 Western Australian state election: Geraldton
Party	Candidate	Votes	%	±%
Labor	John Willcock	1,933	60.6	−39.4
Country	Alfred Curlewis	1,256	39.4	+39.4
Total formal votes		3,189	99.4	
Informal votes		19	0.6	
Turnout		3,208	80.4	
Labor hold		Swing		

1933 Western Australian state election: Geraldton
Party	Candidate	Votes	%	±%
Labor	John Willcock	unopposed		
Labor hold		Swing		

1930 Western Australian state election: Geraldton
Party	Candidate	Votes	%	±%
Labor	John Willcock	2,072	66.8	
Country	George Houston	1,029	33.2	
Total formal votes		3,101	99.2	
Informal votes		26	0.8	
Turnout		3,127	77.9	
Labor hold		Swing		

=== Elections in the 1920s ===
1927 Western Australian state election: Geraldton
Party	Candidate	Votes	%	±%
Labor	John Willcock	1,513	69.2	−30.8
Country	Charles Counsel	675	30.8	+30.8
Total formal votes		2,188	98.6	
Informal votes		31	1.4	
Turnout		2,219	77.4	
Labor hold		Swing	N/A	

1924 Western Australian state election: Geraldton
Party	Candidate	Votes	%	±%
Labor	John Willcock	unopposed		
Labor hold		Swing		

1921 Western Australian state election: Geraldton
Party	Candidate	Votes	%	±%
Labor	John Willcock	1,265	66.1	+18.5
Country	Ebenezer Bartlett	648	33.9	+33.9
Total formal votes		1,913	99.2	+1.3
Informal votes		15	0.8	−1.3
Turnout		1,928	80.0	+4.3
Labor hold		Swing	+15.3	

=== Elections in the 1910s ===
1917 Western Australian state election: Geraldton
Party	Candidate	Votes	%	±%
Labor	John Willcock	904	47.6	–1.6
Nationalist	Samuel Elliott	596	31.4	–19.4
Nationalist	William Fallowfield	399	21.0	+21.0
Total formal votes		1,899	97.9	–1.1
Informal votes		40	2.1	+1.1
Turnout		1,939	75.7	n/a
Two-party-preferred result
Labor	John Willcock	965	50.8	+1.6
Nationalist	Samuel Elliott	934	49.2	–1.6
Labor gain from Nationalist		Swing	+1.6	

1917 Geraldton state by-election
Party	Candidate	Votes	%	±%
Liberal	Samuel Elliott	839	50.8	+7.2
Labor	John Willcock	813	49.2	−7.2
Total formal votes		1,652	99.0	0.0
Informal votes		16	1.0	0.0
Turnout		1,668	N/A	N/A
Liberal gain from Labor		Swing	+7.2	

1914 Western Australian state election: Geraldton
Party	Candidate	Votes	%	±%
Labor	Edward Heitmann	1,370	56.4	+11.2
Liberal	Samuel Elliott	1,060	43.6	+6.9
Total formal votes		2,430	99.0	+0.3
Informal votes		25	1.0	−0.3
Turnout		2,455	63.3	−16.3
Labor hold		Swing	+3.8	

1913 Geraldton state by-election
Party	Candidate	Votes	%	±%
Liberal	Samuel Elliott	762	50.4	+13.7
Labor	Edward Heitmann	750	49.6	+4.4
Total formal votes		1,512	99.2	+0.5
Informal votes		12	0.8	−0.5
Turnout		1,524	63.1	−16.5
Liberal gain from Labor		Swing	+3.0	

1911 Western Australian state election: Geraldton
Party	Candidate	Votes	%	±%
Labor	Bronte Dooley	864	45.2	
Ministerialist	Henry Carson	702	36.7	
Ministerialist	Patrick Stone	252	13.2	
Labor	William Findlay	92	4.8	
Total formal votes		1,910	98.7	
Informal votes		25	1.3	
Turnout		1,935	79.6	
Two-party-preferred result
Labor	Bronte Dooley	1,005	52.6	
Ministerialist	Henry Carson	905	47.4	
Labor gain from Ministerialist		Swing		

=== Elections in the 1900s ===
1908 Western Australian state election: Geraldton
Party	Candidate	Votes	%	±%
Ministerialist	Henry Carson	646	44.3	−6.8
Labor	Thomas Brown	642	44.0	−4.9
Ministerialist	Robert Cochrane	171	11.7	+11.7
Total formal votes		1,459	98.9	−0.1
Informal votes		16	1.1	+0.1
Turnout		1,475	76.0	+4.2
Two-party-preferred result
Ministerialist	Henry Carson	710	51.7	+0.6
Labor	Thomas Brown	663	48.3	−0.6
Ministerialist hold		Swing	+0.6	

1906 Geraldton state by-election
Party	Candidate	Votes	%	±%
Labor	Thomas Brown	601	50.8	+1.9
Ministerialist	Henry Carson	582	49.2	−1.9
Total formal votes		1,183	99.0	0.0
Informal votes		12	1.0	0.0
Turnout		1,195	67.1	−4.7
Labor gain from Ministerialist		Swing	+1.9	

1905 Western Australian state election: Geraldton
Party	Candidate	Votes	%	±%
Ministerialist	Henry Carson	577	51.2	+6.2
Labour	Thomas Brown	551	48.8	+5.8
Total formal votes		1,128	99.0	+0.3
Informal votes		11	1.0	–0.3
Turnout		1,139	71.8	+3.3
Ministerialist hold		Swing	N/A	

1904 Western Australian state election: Geraldton
Party	Candidate	Votes	%	±%
Ministerialist	Henry Carson	482	45.0	+45.0
Labour	Thomas Brown	461	43.0	+43.0
Ministerialist	Henry Spalding	129	12.0	+12.0
Total formal votes		1,072	98.7	n/a
Informal votes		14	1.3	n/a
Turnout		1,086	68.5	n/a
Ministerialist gain from Opposition		Swing	+45.0	

1901 Western Australian state election: Geraldton
Party	Candidate	Votes	%	±%
Opposition	Robert Hutchinson	unopposed		
Opposition hold		Swing		

1900 Geraldton colonial by-election
Party	Candidate	Votes	%	±%
Opposition	Robert Hutchinson	247	61.0	+5.3
Independent	Patrick Stone	158	39.0	+39.0
Total formal votes		405	99.0	+1.2
Informal votes		4	1.0	−1.2
Turnout		409	59.5	+9.5
Opposition gain from Independent		Swing	N/A	

=== Elections in the 1890s ===
1899 Geraldton colonial by-election
Party	Candidate	Votes	%	±%
Independent	Richard Robson	241	59.8	+59.8
Opposition	George Simpson	162	40.2	−15.5
Total formal votes		403	100	+2.2
Informal votes		0	0	−2.2
Turnout		403	62.5	+12.5
Independent gain from Opposition		Swing	N/A	

1897 Western Australian colonial election: Geraldton
Party	Candidate	Votes	%	±%
Opposition	George Simpson	146	55.7	
Opposition	Joseph Thomson	59	22.5	
Ministerialist	Henry Spalding	54	20.6	
Opposition	James Simpson	3	1.2	
Total formal votes		262	97.8	
Informal votes		6	2.2	
Turnout		268	50.0	
Opposition hold		Swing		

1894 Western Australian colonial election: Geraldton
Party	Candidate	Votes	%	±%
None	George Simpson	160	53.5	+53.5
None	Patrick Stone	139	46.5	+46.5

1891 Geraldton colonial by-election
Party	Candidate	Votes	%	±%
None	George Simpson	unopposed		

1890 Western Australian colonial election: Geraldton
Party	Candidate	Votes	%	±%
None	Edward Vivien Harvey Keane	unopposed		
