= Results of the 2017 Western Australian state election (Legislative Assembly) =

This is a list of electoral district results of the 2017 Western Australian election.

Percentages, margins and swings are calculated on notional estimates based on analysis of the redistributed electoral boundaries by the ABC's Antony Green.

== Statewide results ==
Government (41) Labor (41) Opposition (13) Liberal (13) Crossbench (5) National (5)

Legislative Assembly (IRV) – turnout 86.90% (CV)
Party	Votes	%	Swing	Seats	+/–
Labor	557,794	42.20	+9.07	41	▲20
Liberal	412,710	31.23	−15.88	13	▼18
Greens	117,723	8.91	+0.51	0	Steady
National	71,313	5.40	-0.66	5	▼2
One Nation	65,192	4.93	+4.93	0	Steady
Christians	27,724	2.10	+0.29	0	Steady
Shooters, Fishers, Farmers	17,317	1.31	+1.31	0	Steady
Micro Business	13,211	1.00	+1.00	0	Steady
Matheson for WA	6,145	0.47	+0.47	0	Steady
Animal Justice	2,836	0.21	+0.21	0	Steady
Flux the System!	2,188	0.17	+0.17	0	Steady
Family First	1,443	0.11	-0.49	0	Steady
Socialist Alliance	694	0.05	+0.05	0	Steady
Liberal Democrats	561	0.04	+0.04	0	Steady
Independents	24,327	1.84	-1.07	0	Steady
Other	462	0.04	+0.04	0	Steady
Formal votes	1,321,640	95.46	+1.46		
Informal votes	62,860	4.54	−1.46		
Total	1,384,500			59	
Registered voters / turnout	1,593,222	86.90	−2.31		
Two-party-preferred vote
Labor	733,738	55.5	▲12.8		
Liberal	587,353	44.5	▼12.8		

== Results by electoral district ==
=== Albany ===
2017 Western Australian state election: Albany
Party	Candidate	Votes	%	±%
Labor	Peter Watson	10,349	43.9	+5.5
National	Robert Sutton	4,750	20.1	−2.0
Liberal	Greg Stocks	4,149	17.6	−10.9
One Nation	Anthony Griffiths	1,624	6.9	+6.9
Greens	David Rastrick	1,547	6.6	+1.2
Christians	Ian 't Hart	1,167	4.9	+1.1
Total formal votes		23,586	96.6	+0.4
Informal votes		838	3.4	−0.4
Turnout		24,424	90.0	−0.0
Two-candidate-preferred result
Labor	Peter Watson	12,988	55.1	+4.1
National	Robert Sutton	10,585	44.9	+44.9
Labor hold		Swing	+4.1	

=== Armadale ===
2017 Western Australian state election: Armadale
Party	Candidate	Votes	%	±%
Labor	Tony Buti	15,091	66.7	+13.0
Liberal	Wendy Jeffery	3,814	16.9	−15.9
Greens	Anthony Pyle	1,456	6.4	−0.2
Christians	Nitasha Naidu	1,448	6.4	−0.6
Independent	Cameron Huynh	556	2.5	+2.5
Micro Business	Edward Flaherty	269	1.2	+1.2
Total formal votes		22,634	94.5	+1.7
Informal votes		1,325	5.5	−1.7
Turnout		23,959	84.6	+0.3
Two-party-preferred result
Labor	Tony Buti	17,008	75.2	+15.5
Liberal	Wendy Jeffery	5,619	24.8	−15.5
Labor hold		Swing	+15.5	

=== Balcatta ===
2017 Western Australian state election: Balcatta
Party	Candidate	Votes	%	±%
Labor	David Michael	10,265	44.2	+8.6
Liberal	Chris Hatton	8,885	38.3	−13.3
Greens	Nicole Harvey	2,508	10.8	+2.6
Christians	Keith McEncroe	749	3.2	+1.6
Micro Business	Mile Nasteski	544	2.3	+2.3
Liberal Democrats	Richard Tait	252	1.1	+1.1
Total formal votes		23,203	94.2	+1.7
Informal votes		1,426	5.8	−1.7
Turnout		24,629	88.1	+0.3
Two-party-preferred result
Labor	David Michael	12,950	55.8	+12.9
Liberal	Chris Hatton	10,247	44.2	−12.9
Labor gain from Liberal		Swing	+12.9	

=== Baldivis ===
2017 Western Australian state election: Baldivis
Party	Candidate	Votes	%	±%
Labor	Reece Whitby	11,339	45.3	+1.8
Independent	Matt Whitfield	5,346	21.4	+21.4
Liberal	Malcolm George	3,571	14.3	−18.8
One Nation	John Zurakowski	1,854	7.4	+7.4
Greens	Christine Fegebank	1,412	5.6	−0.8
Christians	Yvette Holmes	614	2.5	+0.3
Independent	Craig Hamersley	390	1.6	+1.6
Micro Business	Prabhpreet Makkar	249	1.0	+1.0
Independent	Kath Summers	237	0.9	+0.9
Total formal votes		25,012	95.5	+1.8
Informal votes		1,188	4.5	−1.8
Turnout		26,200	85.1	+12.7
Notional two-party-preferred count
Labor	Reece Whitby	16,987	67.9	+11.5
Liberal	Malcolm George	8,023	32.1	−11.5
Two-candidate-preferred result
Labor	Reece Whitby	14,306	57.2	+0.8
Independent	Matt Whitfield	10,695	42.8	+42.8
Labor hold		Swing	+0.8	

=== Bassendean ===
2017 Western Australian state election: Bassendean
Party	Candidate	Votes	%	±%
Labor	Dave Kelly	13,203	59.1	+12.4
Liberal	Jim Seth	5,192	23.2	−16.3
Greens	Sarah Quinton	2,532	11.3	+1.0
Christians	Paul Mewhor	735	3.3	−0.2
Micro Business	Graeme Martin	680	3.0	+3.0
Total formal votes		22,342	93.9	+2.1
Informal votes		1,455	6.1	−2.1
Turnout		23,797	87.2	−0.2
Two-party-preferred result
Labor	Dave Kelly	15,967	71.5	+16.4
Liberal	Jim Seth	6,365	28.5	−16.4
Labor hold		Swing	+16.4	

=== Bateman ===
2017 Western Australian state election: Bateman
Party	Candidate	Votes	%	±%
Liberal	Dean Nalder	11,515	51.0	−15.3
Labor	Tomas Fitzgerald	6,469	28.7	+9.9
Greens	Adie Wilmot	2,315	10.3	+1.4
One Nation	Michelle Meyers	1,032	4.6	+4.6
Christians	Don Huggins	698	3.1	+3.1
Micro Business	Jonathan Masih	334	1.5	+1.5
Matheson for WA	Adrian Arnold	206	0.9	+0.9
Total formal votes		22,569	96.6	+2.1
Informal votes		792	3.4	−2.1
Turnout		23,361	89.8	−1.6
Two-party-preferred result
Liberal	Dean Nalder	13,418	59.5	−13.7
Labor	Tomas Fitzgerald	9,148	40.5	+13.7
Liberal hold		Swing	−13.7	

=== Belmont ===
2017 Western Australian state election: Belmont
Party	Candidate	Votes	%	±%
Labor	Cassie Rowe	10,547	49.2	+6.9
Liberal	Glenys Godfrey	6,500	30.3	−17.0
Greens	Bhuwan Khadka	1,621	7.6	−0.6
One Nation	Julie Mitchell	1,397	6.5	+6.5
Christians	Sue Fraser	394	1.8	−0.4
Shooters, Fishers, Farmers	Ian Blevin	356	1.7	+1.7
Animal Justice	Brigit Anderson	355	1.7	+1.7
Micro Business	Miral Soboh	280	1.3	+1.3
Total formal votes		21,450	94.8	+1.5
Informal votes		1,169	5.2	−1.5
Turnout		22,619	84.5	−0.3
Two-party-preferred result
Labor	Cassie Rowe	13,162	61.4	+12.4
Liberal	Glenys Godfrey	8,273	38.6	−12.4
Labor gain from Liberal		Swing	+12.4	

=== Bicton ===
2017 Western Australian state election: Bicton
Party	Candidate	Votes	%	±%
Liberal	Matt Taylor	9,734	43.0	−9.9
Labor	Lisa O'Malley	8,955	39.6	+11.8
Greens	Louise Dickmann	2,406	10.6	−1.1
Independent	Steve Kepert	734	3.2	+3.2
Animal Justice	Colleen Saporita	325	1.4	+1.4
Christians	Stephen Wardell-Johnson	237	1.0	+1.0
Micro Business	Richard Korfanty	226	1.0	+1.0
Total formal votes		22,617	97.0	+2.1
Informal votes		695	3.0	−2.1
Turnout		23,312	89.6	+3.8
Two-party-preferred result
Labor	Lisa O'Malley	11,968	52.9	+13.0
Liberal	Matt Taylor	10,641	47.1	−13.0
Labor gain from Liberal		Swing	+13.0	

=== Bunbury ===
2017 Western Australian state election: Bunbury
Party	Candidate	Votes	%	±%
Labor	Don Punch	10,099	43.9	+14.4
Liberal	Ian Morison	5,118	22.2	−30.0
National	James Hayward	3,162	13.7	+6.4
One Nation	Samuel Brown	2,050	8.9	+8.9
Greens	Michael Baldock	1,559	6.8	+0.4
Shooters, Fishers, Farmers	Bernie Masters	804	3.5	+3.5
Flux the System!	Anthony Shannon	172	0.7	+0.7
Micro Business	Aldo Del Popolo	65	0.3	+0.3
Total formal votes		23,029	95.2	+1.3
Informal votes		1,150	4.8	−1.3
Turnout		24,179	86.5	+0.9
Two-party-preferred result
Labor	Don Punch	14,003	60.8	+23.0
Liberal	Ian Morison	9,010	39.2	−23.0
Labor gain from Liberal		Swing	+23.0	

=== Burns Beach ===
2017 Western Australian state election: Burns Beach
Party	Candidate	Votes	%	±%
Labor	Mark Folkard	10,069	42.6	+10.0
Liberal	Albert Jacob	9,768	41.4	−15.7
Greens	Mark Cooper	2,060	8.7	+1.3
Family First	Joy Drennan	504	2.1	+1.3
Christians	Rudolph Crous	476	2.0	−0.0
Matheson for WA	Carl Maddox	471	2.0	+2.0
Micro Business	Sandy Culum-Buzak	266	1.1	+1.1
Total formal votes		23,614	94.7	+1.4
Informal votes		1,325	5.3	−1.4
Turnout		24,939	86.7	+4.1
Two-party-preferred result
Labor	Mark Folkard	12,400	52.5	+13.9
Liberal	Albert Jacob	11,207	47.5	−13.9
Labor gain from Liberal		Swing	+13.9	

=== Butler ===
2017 Western Australian state election: Butler
Party	Candidate	Votes	%	±%
Labor	John Quigley	13,392	55.9	+10.7
Liberal	Linda Aitken	5,006	20.9	−23.6
One Nation	Susan Hoddinott	2,131	8.9	+8.9
Greens	Tom Webster	1,659	6.9	−1.5
Shooters, Fishers, Farmers	Jan van Niekerk	884	3.7	+3.7
Christians	Ryno Joubert	439	1.8	−0.0
Micro Business	Ola Sommer	231	1.0	+1.0
Matheson for WA	Ron Smith	224	0.9	+0.9
Total formal votes		23,966	95.1	+2.0
Informal votes		1,226	4.9	−2.0
Turnout		25,192	82.9	+6.9
Two-party-preferred result
Labor	John Quigley	16,641	69.5	+18.5
Liberal	Linda Aitken	7,321	30.6	−18.5
Labor hold		Swing	+18.5	

=== Cannington ===
2017 Western Australian state election: Cannington
Party	Candidate	Votes	%	±%
Labor	Bill Johnston	11,474	55.0	+10.8
Liberal	Jesse Jacobs	4,970	23.8	−19.4
Greens	Elliot Thompson	1,850	8.9	−0.3
One Nation	Rozane Bezuidenhout	1,372	6.6	+6.6
Christians	Gary Smith	692	3.3	+3.3
Micro Business	Zena Rihani	303	1.5	+1.5
	Mohsin Virk	210	1.0	+1.0
Total formal votes		20,871	95.1	+2.3
Informal votes		1,086	4.9	−2.3
Turnout		21,957	85.3	−0.1
Two-party-preferred result
Labor	Bill Johnston	14,190	68.1	+16.0
Liberal	Jesse Jacobs	6,662	31.9	−16.0
Labor hold		Swing	+16.0	

=== Carine ===
2017 Western Australian state election: Carine
Party	Candidate	Votes	%	±%
Liberal	Tony Krsticevic	12,083	50.1	−13.4
Labor	Andrew Owens	6,851	28.4	+4.0
Greens	Nadine Reeves-Hennessey	2,728	11.3	+1.9
One Nation	Terry Popham	1,231	5.1	+5.1
Christians	Ray Moran	505	2.1	−0.5
Micro Business	Athan Tsirigotis	424	1.8	+1.8
Matheson for WA	Annette Almond	289	1.2	+1.2
Total formal votes		24,111	96.5	+0.9
Informal votes		885	3.5	−0.9
Turnout		24,996	90.8	−0.9
Two-party-preferred result
Liberal	Tony Krsticevic	14,233	59.0	−9.3
Labor	Andrew Owens	9,871	41.0	+9.3
Liberal hold		Swing	−9.3	

=== Central Wheatbelt ===
2017 Western Australian state election: Central Wheatbelt
Party	Candidate	Votes	%	±%
National	Mia Davies	10,489	47.1	+2.6
Labor	Gary Templeman	4,297	19.3	+2.3
One Nation	Shaun Reid	2,571	11.5	+11.5
Liberal	Bill Crabtree	2,496	11.2	−20.0
Shooters, Fishers, Farmers	Diff Reynders	1,158	5.2	+5.2
Greens	Audrey Foote	684	3.1	−0.4
Christians	Dennis Pease	448	2.0	+0.3
Independent	Estelle Gom	150	0.7	+0.7
Total formal votes		22,293	95.9	+1.2
Informal votes		954	4.1	−1.2
Turnout		23,247	88.3	−1.9
Two-candidate-preferred result
National	Mia Davies	16,166	72.6	+13.6
Labor	Gary Templeman	6,111	27.4	+27.4
National hold		Swing	+13.6	

=== Churchlands ===
2017 Western Australian state election: Churchlands
Party	Candidate	Votes	%	±%
Liberal	Sean L'Estrange	12,841	54.9	−3.9
Labor	Paul Lilburne	5,310	22.7	+6.9
Greens	Joanna Gurak	3,103	13.3	+5.6
Independent	Jim Bivoltsis	1,056	4.5	+1.1
Christians	Paul Phillips	481	2.1	+0.6
Micro Business	Daljeet Gill	348	1.5	+1.5
Matheson for WA	Jack Garber	245	1.0	+1.0
Total formal votes		23,384	96.7	+0.3
Informal votes		787	3.3	−0.3
Turnout		24,171	90.0	+1.3
Two-party-preferred result
Liberal	Sean L'Estrange	14,778	63.2	−6.7
Labor	Paul Lilburne	8,599	36.8	+6.7
Liberal hold		Swing	−6.7	

=== Cockburn ===
2017 Western Australian state election: Cockburn
Party	Candidate	Votes	%	±%
Labor	Fran Logan	12,460	53.6	+5.4
Liberal	Lavin Raja-Yogam	6,389	27.5	−14.0
Greens	Shannon Hewitt	2,071	8.9	+1.3
Independent	Steve Portelli	1,194	5.1	+5.1
Christians	Edward Roose	592	2.5	+2.5
Micro Business	Connor McHugh	264	1.1	+1.1
Flux the System!	Erinn Stanfield	264	1.1	+1.1
Total formal votes		23,234	94.5	+0.0
Informal votes		1,354	5.5	−0.0
Turnout		24,588	88.1	+3.4
Two-party-preferred result
Labor	Fran Logan	15,311	65.9	+11.3
Liberal	Lavin Raja-Yogam	7,911	34.1	−11.3
Labor hold		Swing	+11.3	

=== Collie-Preston ===
2017 Western Australian state election: Collie-Preston
Party	Candidate	Votes	%	±%
Labor	Mick Murray	12,246	49.5	+10.7
Liberal	Elysia Harverson	4,408	17.8	−22.7
National	Monique Warnock	3,306	13.4	+2.8
One Nation	David Miller	2,069	8.4	+8.4
Greens	Gordon Tayler	1,170	4.7	−1.4
Shooters, Fishers, Farmers	Clinton Thomas	975	3.9	+3.9
Independent	Louie Scibilia	347	1.4	+1.4
Independent	Don Hyland	230	0.9	+0.9
Total formal votes		24,751	95.8	+1.1
Informal votes		1,086	4.2	−1.1
Turnout		25,837	89.9	+0.6
Two-party-preferred result
Labor	Mick Murray	16,003	64.7	+17.6
Liberal	Elysia Harverson	8,728	35.3	−17.6
Labor gain from Liberal		Swing	+17.6	

=== Cottesloe ===
2017 Western Australian state election: Cottesloe
Party	Candidate	Votes	%	±%
Liberal	Colin Barnett	13,264	56.7	−8.1
Labor	Caitlin Collins	5,280	22.6	+10.4
Greens	Greg Boland	2,826	12.1	+1.8
Independent	Alida Lancee	1,332	5.7	+5.7
Christians	Riaan Groenewald	226	1.0	−0.3
Micro Business	Nicole Poppas	198	0.8	+0.8
	Michael Watson	176	0.8	+0.8
Independent	Dmitry Malov	103	0.4	+0.4
Total formal votes		23,405	96.6	+0.1
Informal votes		819	3.4	−0.1
Turnout		24,224	88.4	+0.1
Two-party-preferred result
Liberal	Colin Barnett	14,799	63.3	−7.8
Labor	Caitlin Collins	8,590	36.7	+7.8
Liberal hold		Swing	−7.8	

=== Darling Range ===
2017 Western Australian state election: Darling Range
Party	Candidate	Votes	%	±%
Labor	Barry Urban	11,012	41.5	+12.5
Liberal	Tony Simpson	8,056	30.4	−25.2
One Nation	Sharon Polgar	2,313	8.7	+8.7
Greens	Iwan Boskamp	2,033	7.7	−1.8
Christians	Derek Bruning	1,174	4.4	−0.5
Shooters, Fishers, Farmers	Stuart Ostle	1,123	4.2	+4.2
Micro Business	Craig Ballinger	317	1.2	+1.2
Flux the System!	Chris Barker	194	0.7	+0.7
Liberal Democrats	Jake McCoull	163	0.6	+0.6
Independent	Manamal Froumis	134	0.5	+0.5
Total formal votes		26,519	95.1	+1.5
Informal votes		1,357	4.9	−1.5
Turnout		27,876	89.5	+6.5
Two-party-preferred result
Labor	Barry Urban	14,788	55.8	+18.9
Liberal	Tony Simpson	11,712	44.2	−18.9
Labor gain from Liberal		Swing	+18.9	

=== Dawesville ===
2017 Western Australian state election: Dawesville
Party	Candidate	Votes	%	±%
Liberal	Zak Kirkup	9,090	36.7	−19.3
Labor	Adam Woodage	8,290	33.5	+4.5
Independent	Dave Schumacher	2,494	10.1	+4.2
One Nation	Lawrence Shave	2,311	9.3	+9.3
Greens	Aeron Blundell-Camden	1,085	4.4	−0.7
Shooters, Fishers, Farmers	Russell McCarthy	641	2.6	+2.6
National	Luke Pilkington	559	2.3	−0.1
Micro Business	Alan Svilicic	169	0.7	+0.7
Flux the System!	Liam Spence	126	0.5	+0.5
Total formal votes		24,765	95.1	+1.0
Informal votes		1,267	4.9	−1.0
Turnout		26,032	87.9	+4.2
Two-party-preferred result
Liberal	Zak Kirkup	12,547	50.7	−12.0
Labor	Adam Woodage	12,204	49.3	+12.0
Liberal hold		Swing	−12.0	

=== Forrestfield ===
2017 Western Australian state election: Forrestfield
Party	Candidate	Votes	%	±%
Labor	Stephen Price	10,357	46.3	+5.8
Liberal	Nathan Morton	6,709	30.0	−16.4
One Nation	Jenny Bennett	2,244	10.0	+10.0
Greens	Eugene Marshall	1,443	6.5	−0.4
Animal Justice	Ashley Jago	747	3.3	+3.3
Christians	Brett Crook	631	2.8	−0.2
Micro Business	M. Shahalam	222	1.0	+1.0
Total formal votes		22,353	94.8	+1.8
Informal votes		1,217	5.2	−1.8
Turnout		23,570	87.3	+1.2
Two-party-preferred result
Labor	Stephen Price	13,281	59.4	+11.6
Liberal	Nathan Morton	9,067	40.6	−11.6
Labor gain from Liberal		Swing	+11.6	

=== Fremantle ===
2017 Western Australian state election: Fremantle
Party	Candidate	Votes	%	±%
Labor	Simone McGurk	12,008	51.2	+7.0
Liberal	Hayden Shenton	4,799	20.5	−8.8
Greens	Martin Spencer	4,408	18.8	−0.2
One Nation	Warren Duffy	1,004	4.3	+4.3
Socialist Alliance	Chris Jenkins	482	2.1	+2.1
Christians	Gabrielle van der Linde	453	1.9	+1.9
Matheson for WA	Janetia Knapp	160	0.7	+0.7
Micro Business	Andrew Ayre	144	0.6	+0.6
Total formal votes		23,458	95.5	+2.1
Informal votes		1,112	4.5	−2.1
Turnout		24,570	85.4	+1.1
Two-party-preferred result
Labor	Simone McGurk	17,127	73.1	+7.7
Liberal	Hayden Shenton	6,318	26.9	−7.7
Labor hold		Swing	+7.7	

=== Geraldton ===
2017 Western Australian state election: Geraldton
Party	Candidate	Votes	%	±%
Labor	Lara Dalton	7,071	33.7	+16.6
Liberal	Ian Blayney	5,808	27.7	−19.9
National	Paul Brown	3,669	17.5	−8.9
One Nation	Wayne Martin	1,979	9.4	+9.4
Greens	Paul Connolly	849	4.0	−2.4
Shooters, Fishers, Farmers	David Caudwell	791	3.8	+3.8
Christians	Greg Hall	413	2.0	−0.5
Independent	Victor Tanti	394	1.9	+1.9
Total formal votes		20,974	95.7	+1.4
Informal votes		937	4.3	−1.4
Turnout		21,911	85.5	−2.5
Two-party-preferred result
Liberal	Ian Blayney	10,759	51.3	−21.5
Labor	Lara Dalton	10,201	48.7	+21.5
Liberal hold		Swing	−21.5	

=== Girrawheen ===
2017 Western Australian state election: Girrawheen
Party	Candidate	Votes	%	±%
Labor	Margaret Quirk	13,452	56.5	+12.0
Liberal	Dame Krcoski	6,484	27.2	−14.9
Greens	Mushfiq Shah	1,353	5.7	+0.1
Christians	David Phillips	905	3.8	+0.1
Family First	Che Tam Nguyen	662	2.8	−1.3
Shooters, Fishers, Farmers	Raymond Roach	607	2.5	+2.5
Micro Business	Sahaj Singh	356	1.5	+1.5
Total formal votes		23,819	94.5	+2.3
Informal votes		1,375	5.5	−2.3
Turnout		25,194	88.6	+6.0
Two-party-preferred result
Labor	Margaret Quirk	15,883	66.7	+14.0
Liberal	Dame Krcoski	7,927	33.3	−14.0
Labor hold		Swing	+14.0	

=== Hillarys ===
2017 Western Australian state election: Hillarys
Party	Candidate	Votes	%	±%
Liberal	Peter Katsambanis	9,343	39.6	−21.7
Labor	Teresa Ritchie	6,773	28.7	+2.5
Independent	Rob Johnson	4,745	20.1	+20.1
Greens	Louahna Lloyd	2,124	9.0	−0.8
Christians	Elisabete Robinson	590	2.5	−0.2
Total formal votes		23,575	96.2	+1.8
Informal votes		938	3.8	−1.8
Turnout		24,513	88.9	+0.7
Two-party-preferred result
Liberal	Peter Katsambanis	12,749	54.1	−11.9
Labor	Teresa Ritchie	10,820	45.9	+11.9
Liberal hold		Swing	−11.9	

=== Jandakot ===
2017 Western Australian state election: Jandakot
Party	Candidate	Votes	%	±%
Labor	Yaz Mubarakai	9,973	39.6	+12.6
Liberal	Joe Francis	9,830	39.1	−25.2
Greens	Dorinda Cox	1,735	6.9	−0.2
One Nation	John Murphy	1,681	6.7	+6.7
Christians	Warnar Spyker	901	3.6	+1.9
Animal Justice	Francesca Gobbert	587	2.3	+2.3
Micro Business	Sat Samra	456	1.8	+1.8
Total formal votes		25,163	96.1	+2.0
Informal votes		1,030	3.9	−2.0
Turnout		26,193	90.2	+10.8
Two-party-preferred result
Labor	Yaz Mubarakai	12,835	51.0	+19.4
Liberal	Joe Francis	12,323	49.0	−19.4
Labor gain from Liberal		Swing	+19.4	

=== Joondalup ===
2017 Western Australian state election: Joondalup
Party	Candidate	Votes	%	±%
Liberal	Jan Norberger	10,037	43.3	−13.1
Labor	Emily Hamilton	9,423	40.6	+7.6
Greens	Lisa Webb	2,009	8.7	+0.4
Independent	Brian Brightman	703	3.0	+3.0
Christians	Rex Host	387	1.7	−0.3
Family First	Nicholas Hart	277	1.2	+0.8
Micro Business	Peter Martin	185	0.8	+0.8
Matheson for WA	Aaron Malloy	183	0.8	+0.8
Total formal votes		23,204	95.6	+1.8
Informal votes		1,070	4.4	−1.8
Turnout		24,274	88.3	−0.9
Two-party-preferred result
Labor	Emily Hamilton	11,737	50.6	+11.0
Liberal	Jan Norberger	11,460	49.4	−11.0
Labor gain from Liberal		Swing	+11.0	

=== Kalamunda ===
2017 Western Australian state election: Kalamunda
Party	Candidate	Votes	%	±%
Liberal	John Day	8,768	37.5	−12.2
Labor	Matthew Hughes	8,683	37.1	+13.9
Greens	Lee-Anne Miles	3,039	13.0	+3.6
One Nation	Ray Gould	1,691	7.2	+7.2
Christians	Brady Williams	653	2.8	+0.1
Matheson for WA	Murray Bowyer	305	1.3	+1.3
Micro Business	Evazelia Colyvas	234	1.0	+1.0
Total formal votes		23,373	96.1	+1.0
Informal votes		939	3.9	−1.0
Turnout		24,312	90.4	−1.4
Two-party-preferred result
Labor	Matthew Hughes	12,268	52.5	+12.7
Liberal	John Day	11,100	47.5	−12.7
Labor gain from Liberal		Swing	+12.7	

=== Kalgoorlie ===
2017 Western Australian state election: Kalgoorlie
Party	Candidate	Votes	%	±%
Liberal	Kyran O'Donnell	4,256	28.0	−10.6
Labor	Darren Forster	3,965	26.1	+6.9
National	Tony Crook	3,713	24.4	−10.3
One Nation	Richard Bolton	1,846	12.1	+12.1
Greens	Jacqueline Spurling	646	4.3	−1.0
Shooters, Fishers, Farmers	Mike Lucas	622	4.1	+4.1
Flux the System!	James Erwin	149	1.0	+1.0
Total formal votes		15,197	95.9	+1.9
Informal votes		649	4.1	−1.9
Turnout		15,846	79.1	−0.4
Two-party-preferred result
Liberal	Kyran O'Donnell	8,533	56.2	−10.3
Labor	Darren Forster	6,656	43.8	+10.3
Liberal hold		Swing	−10.3	

=== Kimberley ===
2017 Western Australian state election: Kimberley
Party	Candidate	Votes	%	±%
Labor	Josie Farrer	5,250	44.8	+18.1
Liberal	Warren Greatorex	2,038	17.4	−8.3
National	Rob Houston	1,915	16.3	−2.0
Greens	Liz Vaughan	1,085	9.3	−14.2
One Nation	Keith Wright	952	8.1	+8.1
Independent	Kai Jones	222	1.9	+1.9
Independent	Graham Chapman	165	1.4	+1.4
Flux the System!	Ryan Albrey	92	0.8	+0.8
Total formal votes		11,719	95.9	+0.9
Informal votes		498	4.1	−0.9
Turnout		12,217	72.5	+1.7
Two-party-preferred result
Labor	Josie Farrer	7,381	63.0	+7.9
Liberal	Warren Greatorex	4,333	37.0	−7.9
Labor hold		Swing	+7.9	

=== Kingsley ===
2017 Western Australian state election: Kingsley
Party	Candidate	Votes	%	±%
Liberal	Andrea Mitchell	9,814	43.1	−16.2
Labor	Jessica Stojkovski	9,305	40.9	+11.1
Greens	Matthew Ward	2,208	9.7	+1.2
Christians	Gilbert Burnside	655	2.9	+0.5
Matheson for WA	John McNair	473	2.1	+2.1
Micro Business	Dominic Staltari	323	1.4	+1.4
Total formal votes		22,778	95.9	+1.4
Informal votes		963	4.1	−1.4
Turnout		23,741	91.0	−1.3
Two-party-preferred result
Labor	Jessica Stojkovski	11,541	50.7	+14.7
Liberal	Andrea Mitchell	11,234	49.3	−14.7
Labor gain from Liberal		Swing	+14.7	

=== Kwinana ===
2017 Western Australian state election: Kwinana
Party	Candidate	Votes	%	±%
Labor	Roger Cook	11,592	55.4	+14.4
Liberal	Bianca Talbot	4,824	23.0	−13.1
One Nation	Tim Taylor	1,968	9.4	+9.4
Greens	Jody Freeman	1,742	8.3	+1.6
Christians	Eleanor Morel	516	2.5	+1.6
Micro Business	Joshua Hyde	298	1.4	+1.4
Total formal votes		20,940	95.1	+1.6
Informal votes		1,078	4.9	−1.6
Turnout		22,018	85.6	−1.8
Two-party-preferred result
Labor	Roger Cook	14,251	68.1	+13.7
Liberal	Bianca Talbot	6,683	31.9	−13.7
Labor hold		Swing	+13.7	

=== Mandurah ===
2017 Western Australian state election: Mandurah
Party	Candidate	Votes	%	±%
Labor	David Templeman	13,273	57.0	+4.5
Liberal	Lynne Rowlands	5,015	21.5	−16.1
One Nation	Doug Shaw	3,008	12.9	+12.9
Greens	Jodie Moffat	1,072	4.6	+1.0
National	Jason Turner	487	2.1	+0.3
Flux the System!	Seb Carrie-Wilson	285	1.2	+1.2
Micro Business	Paul Batsioudis	155	0.7	+0.7
Total formal votes		23,295	94.9	−0.6
Informal votes		1,262	5.1	+0.6
Turnout		24,557	84.7	+1.8
Two-party-preferred result
Labor	David Templeman	15,836	68.0	+10.3
Liberal	Lynne Rowlands	7,451	32.0	−10.3
Labor hold		Swing	+10.3	

=== Maylands ===
2017 Western Australian state election: Maylands
Party	Candidate	Votes	%	±%
Labor	Lisa Baker	11,378	49.8	+7.8
Liberal	Amanda Madden	6,255	27.4	−15.8
Greens	Caroline Perks	3,920	17.1	+4.8
Matheson for WA	Greg Smith	539	2.4	+2.4
Christians	Matt Kleyn	453	2.0	−0.6
Micro Business	Benny Fensome	316	1.4	+1.4
Total formal votes		22,861	95.1	+1.6
Informal votes		1,171	4.9	−1.6
Turnout		24,032	86.8	+0.6
Two-party-preferred result
Labor	Lisa Baker	15,509	67.9	+15.2
Liberal	Amanda Madden	7,345	32.1	−15.2
Labor hold		Swing	+15.2	

=== Midland ===
2017 Western Australian state election: Midland
Party	Candidate	Votes	%	±%
Labor	Michelle Roberts	12,060	49.6	+7.3
Liberal	Daniel Parasiliti	7,032	28.9	−16.7
Greens	Matthew Biggs	2,127	8.8	−0.5
One Nation	Tony D'Angelo	1,915	7.9	+7.9
Shooters, Fishers, Farmers	Trent Passmore	690	2.8	+2.8
Micro Business	John Biltoft	249	1.0	+1.0
Matheson for WA	Greg Ross	230	0.9	+0.9
Total formal votes		24,303	95.3	+1.8
Informal votes		1,195	4.7	−1.8
Turnout		25,498	86.1	+1.4
Two-party-preferred result
Labor	Michelle Roberts	15,315	63.0	+12.6
Liberal	Daniel Parasiliti	8,976	37.0	−12.6
Labor hold		Swing	+12.6	

=== Mirrabooka ===
2017 Western Australian state election: Mirrabooka
Party	Candidate	Votes	%	±%
Labor	Janine Freeman	12,698	59.0	+11.3
Liberal	Lily Chen	5,336	24.8	−14.1
Greens	Rafeif Ismail	1,575	7.3	−1.4
Christians	Chukwudumebi Igbokwe	671	3.1	−1.6
Independent	Kim Mubarak	546	2.5	+2.5
Micro Business	Sareeta Doobree	386	1.8	+1.8
Independent	Matueny Luke	309	1.4	+1.4
Total formal votes		21,521	91.5	+1.4
Informal votes		2,009	8.5	−1.4
Turnout		23,530	84.6	−0.6
Two-party-preferred result
Labor	Janine Freeman	14,879	69.2	+14.6
Liberal	Lily Chen	6,629	30.8	−14.6
Labor hold		Swing	+14.6	

=== Moore ===
2017 Western Australian state election: Moore
Party	Candidate	Votes	%	±%
National	Shane Love	7,406	34.9	−2.2
Labor	Barni Norton	4,424	20.9	+4.5
Liberal	Darren Slyns	4,079	19.2	−19.8
One Nation	Jim Kelly	2,762	13.0	+13.0
Shooters, Fishers, Farmers	Ross Williamson	1,238	5.8	+5.8
Greens	Peter Leam	864	4.1	−1.5
Christians	Wes Porter	422	2.0	+0.1
Total formal votes		21,195	96.0	+1.0
Informal votes		876	4.0	−1.0
Turnout		22,071	89.8	+0.7
Notional two-party-preferred count
Liberal	Chris Wilkins	14,810	73.2	+1.2
Labor	Peter Johnson	5,415	26.8	–1.2
Two-candidate-preferred result
National	Shane Love	13,534	63.9	+8.0
Liberal	Darren Slyns	7,638	36.1	−8.0
National hold		Swing	+8.0	

=== Morley ===
2017 Western Australian state election: Morley
Party	Candidate	Votes	%	±%
Labor	Amber-Jade Sanderson	10,946	51.4	+11.9
Liberal	Ian Britza	6,860	32.2	−17.7
Greens	Anne-Marie Ricciardi	2,017	9.5	+2.6
Christians	Lois Host	580	2.7	+0.6
Shooters, Fishers, Farmers	Paul Longo	523	2.5	+2.5
Micro Business	Nasim Boksmati	351	1.6	+1.6
Total formal votes		21,277	94.1	+2.6
Informal votes		1,340	5.9	−2.6
Turnout		22,617	88.0	−0.6
Two-party-preferred result
Labor	Amber-Jade Sanderson	13,064	61.4	+16.2
Liberal	Ian Britza	8,203	38.6	−16.2
Labor gain from Liberal		Swing	+16.2	

=== Mount Lawley ===
2017 Western Australian state election: Mount Lawley
Party	Candidate	Votes	%	±%
Labor	Simon Millman	9,642	40.8	+7.8
Liberal	Michael Sutherland	9,621	40.7	−13.3
Greens	Matt Roberts	2,938	12.4	+2.6
Christians	Janelle van Burgel	583	2.5	+0.3
Animal Justice	Kandi Revian	497	2.1	+2.1
Micro Business	Alexandra Farsalas	352	1.5	+1.5
Total formal votes		23,633	95.6	+2.0
Informal votes		1,099	4.4	−2.0
Turnout		24,732	88.1	+1.4
Two-party-preferred result
Labor	Simon Millman	12,767	54.0	+12.9
Liberal	Michael Sutherland	10,858	46.0	−12.9
Labor gain from Liberal		Swing	+12.9	

=== Murray-Wellington ===
2017 Western Australian state election: Murray-Wellington
Party	Candidate	Votes	%	±%
Labor	Robyn Clarke	8,484	36.1	+7.9
Liberal	Murray Cowper	6,910	29.4	−20.5
One Nation	Ross Slater	2,652	11.3	+11.3
National	Paul Gillett	2,628	11.2	−0.2
Shooters, Fishers, Farmers	Mark McCall	1,516	6.4	+6.4
Greens	Callum Burwood	1,061	4.5	−1.1
Flux the System!	Daniel Radley	274	1.2	+1.2
Total formal votes		23,525	94.9	+1.8
Informal votes		1,275	5.1	−1.8
Turnout		24,800	88.5	+3.0
Two-party-preferred result
Labor	Robyn Clarke	12,082	51.4	+13.4
Liberal	Murray Cowper	11,430	48.6	−13.4
Labor gain from Liberal		Swing	+13.4	

=== Nedlands ===
2017 Western Australian state election: Nedlands
Party	Candidate	Votes	%	±%
Liberal	Bill Marmion	12,093	51.9	−6.5
Labor	Penny Taylor	6,125	26.3	+12.2
Greens	Daniel Grosso	3,641	15.6	+2.6
Matheson for WA	Andrew Mangano	608	2.6	+2.6
Christians	Christopher Shaw	525	2.3	+0.8
Micro Business	Keith Ginbey	329	1.4	+1.4
Total formal votes		23,321	96.8	+0.5
Informal votes		780	3.2	−0.5
Turnout		24,101	88.1	+1.4
Two-party-preferred result
Liberal	Bill Marmion	13,588	58.3	−10.9
Labor	Penny Taylor	9,728	41.7	+10.9
Liberal hold		Swing	−10.9	

=== North West Central ===
2017 Western Australian state election: North West Central
Party	Candidate	Votes	%	±%
National	Vince Catania	2,571	35.3	−7.5
Labor	Shane Hill	1,979	27.1	+4.4
Liberal	Julee Westcott	1,179	16.2	−11.8
One Nation	Dane Sorensen	818	11.2	+11.2
Greens	Carol Green	426	5.8	+0.8
Independent	Sandy Davies	221	3.0	+3.0
Flux the System!	Adrian D'Cunha	73	1.0	+1.0
Micro Business	Angela Hooper	24	0.3	+0.3
Total formal votes		7,291	95.4	+1.6
Informal votes		349	4.6	−1.6
Turnout		7,640	73.2	−6.4
Two-candidate-preferred result
National	Vince Catania	4,337	59.5	−1.0
Labor	Shane Hill	2,947	40.5	+40.5
National hold		Swing	−1.0	

=== Perth ===
2017 Western Australian state election: Perth
Party	Candidate	Votes	%	±%
Labor	John Carey	11,137	46.5	+10.5
Liberal	Eleni Evangel	8,100	33.8	−15.1
Greens	Hannah Milligan	3,449	14.4	+1.6
Christians	Ken Lim	341	1.4	−0.0
Animal Justice	Matt Hanson	325	1.4	+1.4
Flux the System!	Ben Ballingall	266	1.1	+1.1
Micro Business	Archie Hyde	205	0.9	+0.9
Matheson for WA	Ian Molyneux	148	0.6	+0.6
Total formal votes		23,971	96.4	+2.1
Informal votes		907	3.6	−2.1
Turnout		24,878	83.4	+1.1
Two-party-preferred result
Labor	John Carey	14,815	61.8	+14.6
Liberal	Eleni Evangel	9,148	38.2	−14.6
Labor gain from Liberal		Swing	+14.6	

=== Pilbara ===
2017 Western Australian state election: Pilbara
Party	Candidate	Votes	%	±%
Labor	Kevin Michel	4,386	31.0	+1.2
National	Brendon Grylls	3,860	27.3	−11.3
Liberal	Mark Alchin	2,158	15.3	−7.8
One Nation	David Archibald	1,606	11.4	+11.4
Shooters, Fishers, Farmers	Fiona White-Hartig	1,352	9.6	+9.6
Greens	Brent McKenna	584	4.1	−0.9
Flux the System!	Mark Dunn	133	0.9	+0.9
Micro Business	Davyd Hooper	65	0.5	+0.5
Total formal votes		14,144	95.4	+0.4
Informal votes		677	4.6	−0.4
Turnout		14,821	70.0	−4.3
Two-candidate-preferred result
Labor	Kevin Michel	7,393	52.3	+13.8
National	Brendon Grylls	6,748	47.7	−13.8
Labor gain from National		Swing	+13.8	

=== Riverton ===
2017 Western Australian state election: Riverton
Party	Candidate	Votes	%	±%
Liberal	Mike Nahan	10,047	45.2	−14.6
Labor	Marion Boswell	7,492	33.7	+1.8
Greens	Thor Kerr	2,090	9.4	+2.6
One Nation	Tshung-Hui Chang	1,086	4.9	+4.9
Christians	Susan Regnard	1,058	4.8	+4.8
Matheson for WA	Gavin Waugh	274	1.2	+1.2
Micro Business	Zeeshan Pasha	204	0.9	+0.9
Total formal votes		22,251	96.3	+2.0
Informal votes		850	3.7	−2.0
Turnout		23,101	91.0	−3.1
Two-party-preferred result
Liberal	Mike Nahan	12,092	54.4	−8.3
Labor	Marion Boswell	10,153	45.6	+8.3
Liberal hold		Swing	−8.3	

=== Rockingham ===
2017 Western Australian state election: Rockingham
Party	Candidate	Votes	%	±%
Labor	Mark McGowan	13,576	61.6	+5.2
Liberal	Wendy Baumann	3,965	18.0	−14.5
One Nation	James Omalley	1,915	8.7	+8.7
Greens	James Mumme	1,605	7.3	+1.2
Independent	Craig Buchanan	433	2.0	+2.0
Christians	Sylvia Stonehouse	413	1.9	−0.2
Micro Business	Mark Charles	147	0.7	+0.7
Total formal votes		22,054	95.7	+1.7
Informal votes		998	4.3	−1.7
Turnout		23,052	85.6	−1.5
Two-party-preferred result
Labor	Mark McGowan	16,174	73.4	+10.2
Liberal	Wendy Baumann	5,869	26.6	−10.2
Labor hold		Swing	+10.2	

=== Roe ===
2017 Western Australian state election: Roe
Party	Candidate	Votes	%	±%
National	Peter Rundle	9,553	42.5	−13.2
Liberal	Graham Jacobs	5,383	23.9	−2.8
Labor	Bradley Willis	3,203	14.2	+3.4
One Nation	Eketerina Zacklova	1,792	8.0	+8.0
Shooters, Fishers, Farmers	Peter Stacey	1,182	5.3	+5.3
Greens	Simone McInnes	759	3.4	−0.4
Christians	Cathie Kelly	536	2.4	−0.6
	Tony Fels	76	0.3	+0.3
Total formal votes		22,484	96.2	+0.6
Informal votes		883	3.8	−0.6
Turnout		23,367	89.2	−4.0
Notional two-party-preferred count
National	Peter Rundle	17,148	76.3	−1.3
Labor	Bradley Willis	5,328	23.7	+1.3
Two-candidate-preferred result
National	Peter Rundle	14,474	64.4	−2.3
Liberal	Graham Jacobs	7,997	35.6	+2.3
National hold		Swing	−2.3	

=== Scarborough ===
2017 Western Australian state election: Scarborough
Party	Candidate	Votes	%	±%
Liberal	Liza Harvey	10,829	47.6	−14.2
Labor	Tony Walker	6,668	29.3	+4.8
Greens	Judith Cullity	3,311	14.6	+3.4
One Nation	Margaret Dodd	910	4.0	+4.0
Christians	Kevin Host	430	1.9	−0.5
Micro Business	Dan Bailey	307	1.4	+1.4
Matheson for WA	Steven Pynt	278	1.2	+1.2
Total formal votes		22,733	96.1	+1.4
Informal votes		930	3.9	−1.4
Turnout		23,663	84.8	−0.2
Two-party-preferred result
Liberal	Liza Harvey	12,629	55.6	−11.7
Labor	Tony Walker	10,100	44.4	+11.7
Liberal hold		Swing	−11.7	

=== South Perth ===
2017 Western Australian state election: South Perth
Party	Candidate	Votes	%	±%
Liberal	John McGrath	11,899	50.0	−15.9
Labor	Michael Voros	7,062	29.7	+7.0
Greens	Mark Brogan	2,806	11.8	+2.7
Independent	Fiona Reid	884	3.7	+3.7
Micro Business	Jason St Martin	443	1.9	+1.9
Christians	Rosemary Steineck	441	1.9	+1.9
Independent	M. Francis	244	1.0	+1.0
Total formal votes		23,779	96.4	+1.5
Informal votes		897	3.6	−1.5
Turnout		24,676	86.7	−0.2
Two-party-preferred result
Liberal	John McGrath	13,585	57.1	−12.9
Labor	Michael Voros	10,187	42.9	+12.9
Liberal hold		Swing	−12.9	

=== Southern River ===
2017 Western Australian state election: Southern River
Party	Candidate	Votes	%	±%
Labor	Terry Healy	11,311	49.7	+15.7
Liberal	Peter Abetz	8,853	38.9	−17.1
Greens	Toni Pikos-Sallie	1,443	6.3	+0.5
Independent	Steven Secker	311	1.4	+1.4
Independent	Craig Harley	252	1.1	+1.1
Micro Business	Aman Singh	227	1.0	+1.0
Matheson for WA	Ash Srivastava	222	1.0	+1.0
Liberal Democrats	David Fishlock	146	0.6	+0.6
Total formal votes		22,765	95.2	+1.8
Informal votes		1,145	4.8	−1.8
Turnout		23,910	88.0	+1.9
Two-party-preferred result
Labor	Terry Healy	13,170	57.9	+18.8
Liberal	Peter Abetz	9,591	42.1	−18.8
Labor gain from Liberal		Swing	+18.8	

=== Swan Hills ===
2017 Western Australian state election: Swan Hills
Party	Candidate	Votes	%	±%
Labor	Jessica Shaw	14,335	52.2	+11.8
Liberal	Frank Alban	7,388	26.9	−22.2
One Nation	Sandra Old	3,011	11.0	+11.0
Greens	Evan Webb	1,921	7.0	+0.2
Micro Business	Lucky Singh	512	1.9	+1.9
Matheson for WA	Danusha Bhowaniah	275	1.0	+1.0
Total formal votes		27,442	95.7	+1.3
Informal votes		1,231	4.3	−1.3
Turnout		28,673	88.0	+8.0
Two-party-preferred result
Labor	Jessica Shaw	17,703	64.5	+18.3
Liberal	Frank Alban	9,734	35.5	−18.3
Labor gain from Liberal		Swing	+18.3	

=== Thornlie ===
2017 Western Australian state election: Thornlie
Party	Candidate	Votes	%	±%
Labor	Chris Tallentire	11,983	52.6	+9.1
Liberal	Rob Coales	5,682	25.0	−14.2
One Nation	Sandy Baraiolo	1,747	7.7	+7.7
Greens	Donna McAleese	1,563	6.9	+1.1
Christians	Madeleine Goiran	798	3.5	−0.3
Shooters, Fishers, Farmers	Gary Hammond	526	2.3	+2.3
Micro Business	Sibel Bennett	309	1.4	+1.4
Flux the System!	Andrew van Dam	160	0.7	+0.7
Total formal votes		22,768	94.0	+1.8
Informal votes		1,451	6.0	−1.8
Turnout		24,219	85.7	−2.5
Two-party-preferred result
Labor	Chris Tallentire	14,965	65.8	+14.0
Liberal	Rob Coales	7,781	34.2	−14.0
Labor hold		Swing	+14.0	

=== Vasse ===
2017 Western Australian state election: Vasse
Party	Candidate	Votes	%	±%
Liberal	Libby Mettam	11,032	46.2	−11.0
Labor	Wes Hartley	4,918	20.6	+8.3
National	Peter Gordon	4,606	19.3	+12.0
Greens	Luke O'Connell	3,297	13.8	+3.8
Total formal votes		23,853	96.0	+0.0
Informal votes		992	4.0	−0.0
Turnout		24,845	88.9	+4.1
Two-party-preferred result
Liberal	Libby Mettam	15,429	64.7	−6.5
Labor	Wes Hartley	8,421	35.3	+6.5
Liberal hold		Swing	−6.5	

=== Victoria Park ===
2017 Western Australian state election: Victoria Park
Party	Candidate	Votes	%	±%
Labor	Ben Wyatt	11,574	51.0	+6.4
Liberal	Julian Jacobs	6,396	28.2	−14.5
Greens	Ryan Quinn	3,272	14.4	+2.2
Christians	Mark Staer	915	4.0	+4.0
Micro Business	Jennifer Noye	520	2.3	+2.3
Total formal votes		22,677	95.7	+2.3
Informal votes		1,025	4.3	−2.3
Turnout		23,702	84.1	+0.0
Two-party-preferred result
Labor	Ben Wyatt	15,064	66.5	+12.5
Liberal	Julian Jacobs	7,595	33.5	−12.5
Labor hold		Swing	+12.5	

=== Wanneroo ===
2017 Western Australian state election: Wanneroo
Party	Candidate	Votes	%	±%
Labor	Sabine Winton	10,930	46.8	+14.5
Liberal	Paul Miles	7,017	30.1	−25.5
One Nation	Joseph Darcy	2,288	9.8	+9.8
Greens	Robyn Treacy	1,552	6.6	−0.9
Christians	Linley Pass	629	2.7	+0.1
Independent	Max Wilson	595	2.5	+2.5
Micro Business	Peter Rosengrave	173	0.7	+0.7
Matheson for WA	Greg Macpherson	160	0.7	+0.7
Total formal votes		23,344	95.9	+2.5
Informal votes		996	4.1	−2.5
Turnout		24,340	88.1	+3.6
Two-party-preferred result
Labor	Sabine Winton	13,361	57.3	+18.2
Liberal	Paul Miles	9,975	42.7	−18.2
Labor gain from Liberal		Swing	+18.2	

=== Warnbro ===
2017 Western Australian state election: Warnbro
Party	Candidate	Votes	%	±%
Labor	Paul Papalia	13,821	60.6	+6.2
Liberal	Luke Muscedere	3,631	15.9	−20.7
One Nation	Alexander Scholz	2,721	11.9	+11.9
Greens	Jillian Cain	1,582	6.9	−2.0
Christians	Deonne Kingsford	540	2.4	+2.4
Matheson for WA	Thomas Hunter	286	1.3	+1.3
Micro Business	Samantha Figgins	218	1.0	+1.0
Total formal votes		22,799	95.7	+3.1
Informal votes		1,022	4.3	−3.1
Turnout		23,821	84.9	+3.3
Two-party-preferred result
Labor	Paul Papalia	16,800	73.7	+13.1
Liberal	Luke Muscedere	5,988	26.3	−13.1
Labor hold		Swing	+13.1	

=== Warren-Blackwood ===
2017 Western Australian state election: Warren-Blackwood
Party	Candidate	Votes	%	±%
National	Terry Redman	8,639	36.6	−1.2
Labor	Hugh Litson	4,854	20.6	+5.9
Liberal	Ross Woodhouse	3,703	15.7	−11.7
Greens	Andrew Huntley	3,391	14.4	−1.3
One Nation	Greg Moroney	1,641	7.0	+7.0
Shooters, Fishers, Farmers	Marc Deas	1,344	5.7	+5.7
Total formal votes		23,572	95.6	+1.1
Informal votes		1,080	4.4	−1.1
Turnout		24,652	89.1	+0.3
Two-candidate-preferred result
National	Terry Redman	14,942	63.4	+6.3
Labor	Hugh Litson	8,622	36.6	+36.6
National hold		Swing	+6.3	

=== West Swan ===
2017 Western Australian state election: West Swan
Party	Candidate	Votes	%	±%
Labor	Rita Saffioti	13,456	57.1	+12.9
Liberal	Rod Henderson	6,141	26.1	−21.2
Greens	Beth McMullan	1,721	7.3	+1.5
Shooters, Fishers, Farmers	Trevor Ruwoldt	985	4.2	+4.2
Christians	Isaac Moran	696	3.0	+0.4
Matheson for WA	James Lawrence	569	2.4	+2.4
Total formal votes		23,568	94.1	+1.2
Informal votes		1,473	5.9	−1.2
Turnout		25,041	88.4	+7.9
Two-party-preferred result
Labor	Rita Saffioti	15,812	67.1	+18.0
Liberal	Rod Henderson	7,744	32.9	−18.0
Labor hold		Swing	+18.0	

=== Willagee ===
2017 Western Australian state election: Willagee
Party	Candidate	Votes	%	±%
Labor	Peter Tinley	11,229	52.7	+9.8
Liberal	Rebecca Aubrey	6,547	30.7	−13.2
Greens	Felicity McGeorge	2,470	11.6	+0.7
Christians	Robin Hosking	514	2.4	+2.4
Micro Business	Paul Potter	334	1.6	+1.6
Socialist Alliance	Corina Abraham	212	1.0	+1.0
Total formal votes		21,306	95.7	+2.1
Informal votes		957	4.3	−2.1
Turnout		22,263	88.5	−2.1
Two-party-preferred result
Labor	Peter Tinley	13,948	65.5	+13.0
Liberal	Rebecca Aubrey	7,351	34.5	−13.0
Labor hold		Swing	+13.0	
