= Electoral results for the Division of Durack =

Australian division election results

This is a list of electoral results for the Division of Durack in Australian federal elections from the division's creation in 2010 until the present.

== Members ==
Member	Party	Term
Barry Haase	Liberal	2010–2013
Melissa Price	Liberal	2013–present

== Election results ==
=== Elections in the 2020s ===
==== 2025 ====
2025 Australian federal election: Durack
Party	Candidate	Votes	%	±%
Liberal	Melissa Price			
Legalise Cannabis	Kat Wright			
National	Bailey Kempton			
One Nation	Mark Berry			
Indigenous-Aboriginal	Jason Hunter			
Trumpet of Patriots	Maarten Kornaat			
Labor	Karen Wheatland			
Greens	Brendan Sturcke			
Christians	Eugenie Margaret Harris			
Total formal votes				
Informal votes				
Turnout				

==== 2022 ====
2022 Australian federal election: Durack
Party	Candidate	Votes	%	±%
Liberal	Melissa Price	30,736	34.33	−10.24
Labor	Jeremiah Riley	26,093	29.15	+6.45
National	Ian Blayney	9,160	10.23	+2.50
Greens	Bianca McNeair	8,457	9.45	+1.42
One Nation	Brenton Johannsen	6,174	6.90	−2.73
Great Australian	Adrian Mcrae	2,738	3.06	+3.06
Western Australia	Anthony Fels	2,483	2.77	−0.52
United Australia	Andrew Middleton	2,229	2.49	−0.23
Federation	Craig Shore	1,453	1.62	+1.62
Total formal votes		89,523	93.50	−1.12
Informal votes		6,219	6.50	+1.12
Turnout		95,742	80.86	−4.49
Two-party-preferred result
Liberal	Melissa Price	48,583	54.27	−9.22
Labor	Jeremiah Riley	40,940	45.73	+9.22
Liberal hold		Swing	−9.22	

Alluvial diagram for preference flows in the seat of Durack in the 2022 federal election. indicates at what stage the winning candidate had over 50% of the votes and was declared the winner.

=== Elections in the 2010s ===
==== 2019 ====
2019 Australian federal election: Durack
Party	Candidate	Votes	%	±%
Liberal	Melissa Price	34,429	44.30	+2.56
Labor	Sharyn Morrow	16,742	21.54	−4.36
National	Scott Bourne	7,878	10.14	−5.84
One Nation	Grahame Gould	7,407	9.53	+9.53
Greens	Johani Mamid	6,287	8.09	−1.96
Western Australia	Gary Mounsey	2,895	3.72	+3.72
United Australia	Brenden Hatton	2,083	2.68	+2.68
Total formal votes		77,721	95.23	−0.86
Informal votes		3,892	4.77	+0.86
Turnout		81,613	84.08	+2.05
Two-party-preferred result
Liberal	Melissa Price	50,332	64.76	+3.70
Labor	Sharyn Morrow	27,389	35.24	−3.70
Liberal hold		Swing	+3.70	

==== 2016 ====
2016 Australian federal election: Durack
Party	Candidate	Votes	%	±%
Liberal	Melissa Price	32,011	41.74	+3.59
Labor	Carol Martin	19,860	25.90	+5.87
National	Lisa Cole	12,257	15.98	−7.42
Greens	Ian James	7,710	10.05	+3.10
Rise Up Australia	Mitchell Sambell	2,885	3.76	+2.69
Christians	Grahame Gould	1,966	2.56	+1.25
Total formal votes		76,689	96.09	+2.49
Informal votes		3,122	3.91	−2.49
Turnout		79,811	82.03	−6.89
Two-party-preferred result
Liberal	Melissa Price	46,823	61.06	+7.08
Labor	Carol Martin	29,866	38.94	+38.94
Liberal hold		Swing	+7.08	

==== 2013 ====
2013 Australian federal election: Durack
Party	Candidate	Votes	%	±%
Liberal	Melissa Price	28,143	38.01	−7.06
National	Shane Van Styn	17,145	23.16	+5.46
Labor	Daron Keogh	15,018	20.28	−3.75
Greens	Ian James	5,227	7.06	−2.19
Palmer United	Des Headland	4,998	6.75	+6.75
Christians	Grahame Gould	972	1.31	+1.31
Rise Up Australia	Shane Foreman	810	1.09	+1.09
Katter's Australian	Aaron Todd	783	1.06	+1.06
Family First	Ian Rose	763	1.03	−1.37
Citizens Electoral Council	Judy Sudholz	177	0.24	+0.24
Total formal votes		74,036	93.61	−1.53
Informal votes		5,056	6.39	+1.53
Turnout		79,092	87.04	−1.15
Two-party-preferred result
Liberal	Melissa Price	48,031	64.88	+1.21
Labor	Daron Keogh	26,005	35.12	−1.21
Two-candidate-preferred result
Liberal	Melissa Price	39,965	53.98	−9.69
National	Shane Van Styn	34,071	46.02	+46.02
Liberal hold		Swing	N/A	

==== 2010 ====
2010 Australian federal election: Durack
Party	Candidate	Votes	%	±%
Liberal	Barry Haase	32,446	45.07	−1.00
Labor	Shane Hill	17,299	24.03	−8.80
National	Lynne Craigie	12,742	17.70	+9.67
Greens	Julie Matheson	6,661	9.25	+3.32
Family First	Jane Foreman	1,729	2.40	+1.09
Christian Democrats	Mac Forsyth	1,121	1.56	−0.32
Total formal votes		71,998	95.14	−0.44
Informal votes		3,678	4.86	+0.44
Turnout		75,676	88.22	+1.06
Two-party-preferred result
Liberal	Barry Haase	45,843	63.67	+6.02
Labor	Shane Hill	26,155	36.33	−6.02
Liberal hold		Swing	+6.02	
