= 1991 Geraldton state by-election =

The 1991 Geraldton state by-election was a by-election for the seat of Geraldton in the Legislative Assembly of Western Australia held on 20 July 1991. It was triggered by the resignation of Jeff Carr (the sitting Labor member) on 28 February 1991, due to his expulsion from cabinet. The election was won by the Liberal candidate, Bob Bloffwitch, who won 51.4 percent of the two-candidate-preferred (2CP) vote. The National Party also made the final 2CP count, despite having not stood a candidate in Geraldton since the 1974 state election, whereas Labor slumped to just 16.6 percent on first preferences, a swing of 31 points from the 1989 state election.

== Background ==
Jeff Carr, a former schoolteacher, had held Geraldton for the Labor Party since the 1974 state election. However, he was nearly defeated at the 1986 election, falling from a comfortably safe majority of 63.1 percent of the two-party preferred vote to an extremely marginal 50.4 percent. He was reelected with an equally narrow 50.2 percent at the 1989 state election. Carr served as a minister under Brian Burke, Peter Dowding, and Carmen Lawrence. On 2 February 1991 Lawrence, removed him from the ministry (along with two others, Pam Buchanan and Gavan Troy). Carr resigned from parliament on 28 February, and the writ for the by-election was issued on 6 March, with the close of nominations on 22 March. Polling day was on 13 April, with the writ returned on 24 April.

== Results ==
Geraldton state by-election, 1991
Party	Candidate	Votes	%	±%
Liberal	Bob Bloffwitch	4,446	45.5	+2.0
National	Malcolm Short	2,054	21.0	+21.0
Labor	Dianne Spowart	1,620	16.6	–31.0
Independent	Faye Simpson	471	4.8	+4.8
Independent	Helena Shields	315	3.2	+3.2
Independent	Albert Lenane	286	2.9	+2.9
Independent	Kenneth Gallaher	165	1.7	+1.7
Grey Power	Jason Meotti	146	1.5	–7.4
Independent	Bruce Burges	144	1.5	+1.5
Independent	Arthur Davies	67	0.7	+0.7
Independent	William Thomson	57	0.6	+0.6
Total formal votes		9,771	94.5	+0.5
Informal votes		566	5.5	–0.5
Turnout		10,337	86.8	–4.0
Two-candidate-preferred result
Liberal	Bob Bloffwitch	5,024	51.4	+1.6
National	Malcolm Short	4,747	48.6	+48.6
Liberal gain from Labor		Swing	N/A	

== Aftermath ==
The Labor Party regained much of its previous support in Geraldton at the 1993 state election, recording a positive swing of 17.2 points in contrast to a statewide negative swing of 5.4 points. This was not enough to regain the seat, however, and Bloffwitch held Geraldton until being defeated by Shane Hill at the 2001 state election.

== See also ==
- 1991 Floreat state by-election, held on the same day
- Electoral results for the district of Geraldton
- List of Western Australian state by-elections
