= Samuel Elliott =

Australian pastoralist and politician

Member of the Legislative Assembly of Western Australia
- In office 16 November 1913 – 21 October 1914
- Preceded by: Bronte Dooley
- Succeeded by: Edward Heitmann
- Constituency: Geraldton
- In office 14 April – 29 September 1917
- Preceded by: Edward Heitmann
- Succeeded by: John Willcock
- Constituency: Geraldton

Personal details
- Born: Samuel Richard Lewes Elliott; 21 April 1860 Penbryn, Cardiganshire, Wales
- Died: 14 July 1933 (aged 73) Mosman Park, Western Australia, Australia
- Party: Liberal (to 1917); Nationalist (from 1917)

Samuel Richard Lewes Elliott (21 April 1860 – 14 July 1933) was an Australian pastoralist and politician who served as a member of the Legislative Assembly of Western Australia from 1913 to 1914 and for a brief period in 1917, on both occasions representing the seat of Geraldton.

Elliott was born in Penbryn, Cardiganshire, Wales, to Emeline Maria (née Lloyd) and Thomas Elliott. He arrived in Western Australia in 1875, at the age of 15, and began working on Theodore Fawcett's estate at Pinjarra. In 1880, Elliott was involved in the formation of the Murray Squatting Company, along with two other future MPs, Alexander Richardson and William Paterson. The company established Yeeda Station, the first station in the Kimberley, and later took over Mardie Station (in the Pilbara). Elliott eventually acquired several leases in his own name, including Oakabella, Tallering, Wyngangoo, Yandil, and Annean. In 1906, he was elected to the Northampton Road Board.

A member of the Liberal Party, Elliott entered parliament at the 1913 Geraldton by-election, caused by the death of the sitting Labor member, Bronte Dooley. He defeated the Labor candidate, Edward Heitmann, by just 12 votes, and Heitmann reversed the result at the 1914 state election. However, Heitmann resigned from parliament in March 1917 in order to stand for the House of Representatives, and Elliott reclaimed Geraldton at the resulting by-election. His second term in parliament lasted only five months, as he was beaten by John Willcock (a future Labor premier) at the 1917 state election, where the final margin was just 31 votes on the two-candidate-preferred count. Elliott eventually retired to Buckland Hill, Perth (present-day Mosman Park), serving for a number of years on the Buckland Hill Road Board. He died there in July 1933, aged 73.

Parliament of Western Australia
Preceded by Bronte Dooley; Edward Heitmann	Member for Geraldton; 1913–1914; 1917	Succeeded by Edward Heitmann; John Willcock
