= Bronte Dooley =

Australian politician

- Constituency: Geraldton

Personal details
- Born: 4 July 1867 West Ham, Essex, England
- Died: 19 October 1913 (aged 46) West Perth, Western Australia
- Party: Labor Party
- Spouses: Annie Creo Stanley (m. 1888; div. 1893); Helen Watson (m. 1904)
- Profession: Railwayman/carriage builder

Bronterre Washington Dooley (4 July 1867—19 October 1913), known as Bronte Dooley, was an Australian politician, and a member of the Western Australian Legislative Assembly from 1911 until 1913 representing the seat of Geraldton for the Labor Party. Prior to entering politics, he worked for the Labor cause for more than 20 years, including helping to organise the first elections in which the Australian Labor movement participated in New South Wales in 1891.

== Biography ==
Dooley was born in West Ham, Essex to James Dooley, a storeman and stonemason, and Ann (née Harkin). The family moved to Sydney when he was young, and he was educated there before being apprenticed as a railway coach builder in 1884. Influenced by his father who was a prominent member of the Operative Stonemasons' Society in Sydney, Dooley joined the Sydney Coachbuilders' Society at the conclusion of his apprenticeship in 1888 and also became associated with the Sydney Socialist League. He married Annie Creo Stanley, who later became a trade union leader, on 29 March 1888 in Redfern, but he left her some time later and they officially divorced in March 1893.

In 1891, while a member of the Paddington Political Labor League, he assisted in organising Political Labor's campaign for the elections to the New South Wales Legislative Assembly—the first organised Labor campaign anywhere in Australia. The candidate in the four-member Paddington seat was George Dyson, a young compositor from Perth, Western Australia who came a close fifth and hence was defeated.

Following the election, a series of poor export conditions, busted land booms and failed financial institutions plunged much of eastern Australia into recession. Dooley obtained work as a prospector, miner, farm hand, shearer and carpenter in outback areas of Australia and in New Zealand before moving to Perth, Western Australia in 1897, where he became a coachbuilder for the Railways Department. In 1898, he became a foundation member of the state branch of the Amalgamated Society of Railway Employees, and took a leading role in obtaining official recognition for the body. Among his achievements were having a Railways Department regulation overturned which forbade political or municipal activity by employees, negotiating a complete classification for all waged staff in the railways. He also helped to negotiate an increase from 7s. to 8s. per day for fettlers, although this measure partly involved a strike which hampered railway traffic for over a week. He was a delegate for the Railway Society to the Trades and Labor Council in 1901–1902.

In 1903, Dooley moved to Geraldton in the state's Mid West and worked in carriage and coach building. On 16 June 1904, he married Helen Watson, with whom he was to have two daughters. He was a leader in the local labour movement, organising a protest for the Eight Hours movement, and helping to establish the Victoria District General Workers' Union and also of the Labor Party's Geraldton branch, in both cases serving as inaugural president. He also founded the Geraldton Co-operative Society. joined the local Railway Ambulance Corps and served as president of the Railways Football Club, and was prominent in the local Amateur Dramatic Society.

Dooley attempted to gain Labor preselection for the Geraldton electorate ahead of the 1908 state election. The sitting member, Thomas Leishman Brown, won the preselection, but lost the election to the Ministerial (later Liberal) candidate Henry Carson. Dooley then ran for and won the East Ward of the Geraldton Municipal Council in 1910, following a decision by that body to let municipal work by contract, and he served two terms as a councillor thereafter. He enjoyed the support of the Geraldton Express newspaper, edited by John Drew, a member of the Legislative Council who was later to join the Labor Party.

Dooley succeeded in becoming the endorsed Labor candidate ahead of the 1911 state elections against fellow Geraldton councillor E. C. Bartlett and one other candidate. He briefly made headline news when on 23 September, less than two weeks before the vote, he and two other railway employees were sacked by the Railways Commissioner, J. T. Short, for nominating as candidates for the elections. The situation caused some embarrassment for the Liberal Government, and the Premier, Frank Wilson, intervened to have their positions restored. As it turned out, Dooley obtained a 4.33% swing to gain the seat from Carson.

In Parliament, he championed the Geraldton Water Scheme, which was established during his term, and advocated for the improvement of Geraldton's harbour and establishment of a freezing works at the port, as well as a Saturday holiday for shop assistants. The Geraldton Guardian, a paper generally supporting the Liberal cause, described him as "hardworking and painstaking in doing all he could to advance the interests of this town".

He was never in very good health, but worked tirelessly to assist Labor candidates at the 1913 federal election, and continued with his commitments in the Geraldton community. Eventually, he was admitted to St Omar's Hospital in Havelock Street, West Perth, where he died of tuberculosis of the throat on 19 October 1913, aged 46. He was buried in the Catholic section of Karrakatta Cemetery and many Labor figures attended his funeral.

Parliament of Western Australia
Preceded by Henry Carson	Member for Geraldton; 1911–1913	Succeeded by Edward Heitmann
