= George Simpson (Western Australian politician) =

Australian politician

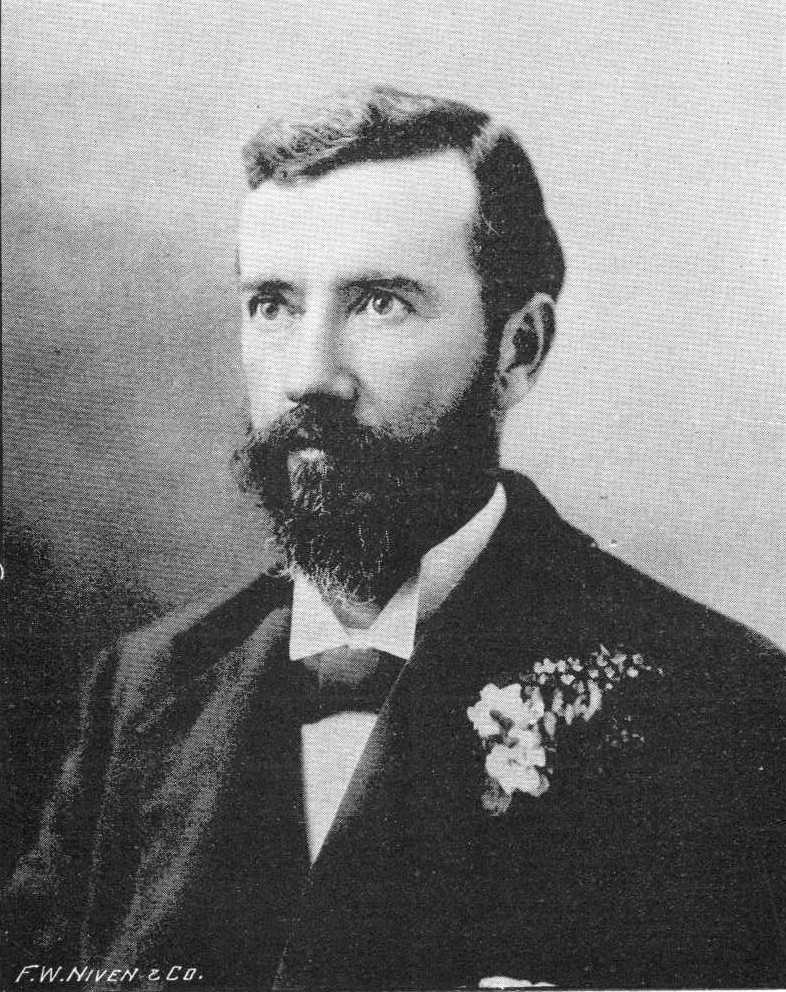

Member of the Legislative Assembly of Western Australia
- In office 10 December 1891 – 27 June 1899
- Preceded by: Edward Keane
- Succeeded by: Richard Robson
- Constituency: Geraldton

Personal details
- Born: 7 June 1856 Glebe, New South Wales, Australia
- Died: 7 August 1906 (aged 50) Subiaco, Western Australia, Australia

George Thomas Simpson (7 June 1856 – 7 August 1906) was an Australian businessman and politician who served in the Legislative Assembly of Western Australia from 1891 to 1899, representing the seat of Geraldton.

== Early life ==
Simpson was born in Sydney to Maria (née Hawthorne) and James Simpson. He initially attended Sydney Grammar School, but his family later moved to Dunedin, New Zealand, where he went to Dunedin High School. Simpson trained as a lawyer but did not complete his training, instead entering commercial life. He moved to Gisborne in 1878, and then returned to Australia in 1883, working as a stockbroker in Broken Hill, New South Wales. He came to Western Australia in 1888, and became the first secretary of the Perth Stock Exchange.

== Politics and later life ==
Simpson was elected to parliament unopposed at an 1891 by-election for the seat of Geraldton, which had been prompted by the resignation of Edward Keane. After being re-elected at the 1894 and 1897 elections, he was declared bankrupt in 1899, and forced to resign his seat. He was unable to reclaim it at the resulting by-election, losing to Richard Robson. From the mid-1890s, Simpson suffered from locomotor ataxia. He was confined to hospital in late 1899, and eventually moved to a nursing home in Subiaco, where he died in 1906 (aged only 50).

== See also ==
- Electoral results for the district of Geraldton

Parliament of Western Australia
Preceded by Edward Keane	Member for Geraldton; 1891–1899	Succeeded by Richard Robson
