= Robert Hutchinson (Australian politician) =

Australian politician

- Constituency: Geraldton

Personal details
- Born: 3 March 1857 Northampton, Colony of Western Australia
- Died: 14 July 1918 (aged 61) Maylands, Western Australia
- Spouse: Mary Gray
- Profession: Builder

Robert David Hutchinson (3 March 1857 – 14 July 1918) was an Australian politician, and a member of the Western Australian Legislative Assembly from 1900 until 1904 representing the seat of Geraldton.

== Biography ==
Hutchinson was born in Northampton, a town north of Geraldton, to Robert Hutchinson, the manager of the Waneranooka mine, and Mary Halloran. He worked with his father on the mine until 1878, when he left for Sydney. He worked there with his brother as a builder, stonemason and contractor. On 14 December 1885 at St John's Church in the Sydney suburb of Glebe, he married Mary Ann Gray, with whom he had one son and three daughters.

In 1890, he returned to Geraldton with his young family, and was elected to the Geraldton Town Council in 1892. He was made a Justice of the Peace in 1898, and became Mayor of Geraldton from 1898 until 1900.

At a by-election on 24 July 1900 following the resignation of Richard Robson, Hutchinson was elected to the Western Australian Legislative Assembly for the seat of Geraldton. He was in opposition to the party led by Premier Sir John Forrest, and in the confusing parliamentary situation created by the 1901 election, he was counted with the supporters of George Leake, who became Premier twice, and his successor Walter James. He retired at the 1904 election.

Following his time in Parliament, he worked in various temporary positions in the Department of Lands and Surveys and the Department of Public Works. He was elected to the Town Council for a year in 1908–1909.

Hutchinson died on 14 July 1918 in Maylands, and was buried in the Anglican section of Karrakatta Cemetery.

Preceded by Richard Robson	Member for Geraldton; 1900–1904	Succeeded by Henry Carson
