= Edmund Hall (Australian politician) =

Australian politician

- Constituency: Central Province (1928–1947); Geraldton (1947–1950)

Personal details
- Born: 13 August 1878 Geraldton, Western Australia, Australia
- Died: 28 July 1965 (aged 86) Applecross, Western Australia
- Party: Country Party
- Spouse: Catherine Forster
- Profession: Storekeeper and area agent

Edmund Henry Hartley Hall (13 August 1878 – 28 July 1965) was an Australian politician who represented the Western Australian Legislative Council district of Central Province from 1928 until 1947, and the Legislative Assembly seat of Geraldton from 1947 until 1950. He was a member of the Country Party.

== Biography ==
Born to Edward Hall, a labour, baker and contractor, and Ellen (née Craggs) in the port city of Geraldton, Western Australia, Hall was educated locally before gaining employment at the post office, where he worked in various locations over 20 years. By 1911, he was the postmaster at Laverton, and on 20 April 1916, he married Catherine Forster at St Andrew's Church, Subiaco, with whom he was to have one son and four daughters.

On 5 August 1918, he enlisted and was appointed Second Lieutenant with the First Australian Imperial Force, on account of his 7 years' earlier service with the Rifles in Geraldton. He was assigned to the Australian Light Horse Regiment, and reported to Blackboy Hill, but did not leave Australia and was discharged on 1 December 1918. He then continued his career with the postal service, then became a storekeeper and agent in Geraldton. On 24 November 1920, he was elected to Geraldton Municipal Council, and served eight years as a councillor.

In May 1928, he contested one of the three Legislative Council seats in Central Province, which had historically been Labor-held, and won it. He went on to sit in the Council for 19 years, serving on select committees into the Hire Purchase Act, the distribution of funds provided by the Commonwealth to aid wheat growers, and the care and reform of juvenile delinquents.

He resigned his seat before the 1947 Assembly election to contest the seat of Geraldton, following the retirement from politics of the former Labor Premier, John Willcock, who had held the seat for 30 years. Hall won the seat by 11 votes against Bill Sewell, and served a single term before being defeated by Sewell at the 1950 election.

On 4 July 1950, his wife Catherine died. Little is known of his later life, and he died on 28 July 1965 at Martindale Hospital in the Perth suburb of Applecross, and was buried at Karrakatta Cemetery.

Parliament of Western Australia
Preceded by James Hickey	Member for Central Province; 1928–1947	Succeeded by Les Logan
Preceded by John Willcock	Member for Geraldton; 1947–1950	Succeeded by Bill Sewell
