= Edward Keane (politician) =

Australian politician

Edward Keane MLA
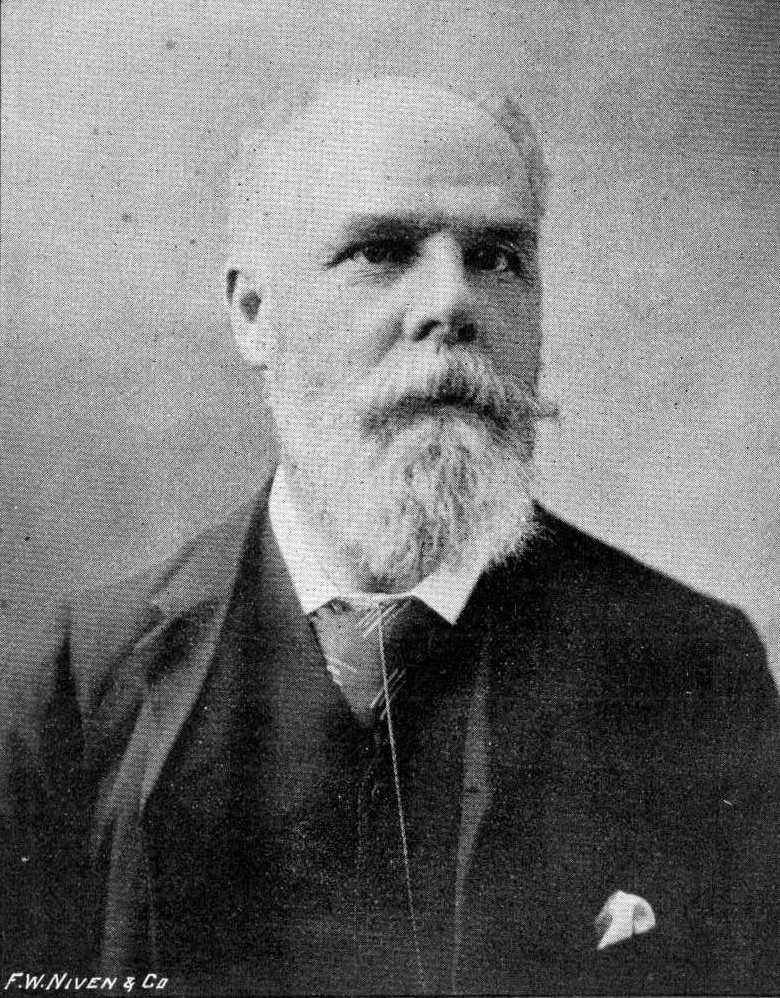

Mayor of Perth
- In office 25 May 1891 – 18 March 1892
- Preceded by: Edward Scott
- Succeeded by: Stephen Henry Parker

Member of Parliament for Geraldton
- In office 1890–1891
- Preceded by: New constituency
- Succeeded by: George Simpson

Member of Parliament for Central Province
- In office 30 May 1904 – 9 July 1904
- Preceded by: Various
- Succeeded by: Vernon Hamersley

Personal details
- Born: 8 August 1844 Birkenhead, Cheshire, England
- Died: 9 July 1904 (aged 59) West Perth, Western Australia, Australia
- Party: Independent (nominally Ministerial)

Edward Vivian Harvey Keane (8 August 1844 – 9 July 1904) was an Australian engineer, businessman, and politician. Born in Birkenhead, England, he was educated at Christ's Hospital, and emigrated to Melbourne, Victoria, in 1876. Keane then moved to South Australia, where he worked as a railway engineer. He later moved to Western Australia, where he served in both the Legislative Assembly and the Legislative Council.

== Early life ==
Keane was born on 8 August 1844 in Birkenhead, Cheshire. His father, also Edward Keane, was a captain in the Royal Navy, and was a relative of John Keane, 1st Baron Keane, who had been made a peer for his service in India.

In the mid-1870s, construction was begun on a railway line in the Kapunda area of South Australia, with Keane appointed as the engineer in charge of the project. The line was originally surveyed to run through Illawarra, a property owned by Abraham White, brother of James White MP, but Keane had a new survey carried out so that the line was moved away from the property. He married White's daughter, Lilla Rebecca Wharton White (1858–1934), at St Peter's College Chapel in Adelaide on 27 May 1879. They would later have five children.

== Death ==
While campaigning for election to East Province in July 1904, prior to the upcoming elections, Keane caught a cold, which subsequently developed into pleurisy and pneumonia. The West Australian observed that the "exigencies of an election campaign probably accounted for the trouble receiving slight attention". His condition having worsened, Keane was removed to Miss McKimmie's Private Hospital on Havelock Street in what is now West Perth, where he died of heart failure on the morning of 9 July. He was buried the following day in the Church of England section of Karrakatta Cemetery, with the Bishop of Perth, Charles Riley, officiating at the service. Flags were flown at half-mast in Perth the day of the funeral. The Daily News noted that up until his illness he had "enjoyed such robust physical health, combined with rare mental activity and energy, that most people who knew him would have credited him with fewer years. Four men nominated for the vacancy caused by Keane's death (Hugh Edmiston, Vernon Hamersley, E. J. Hart, and Isidore Grimish), with Hamersley eventually elected.

== Legacy ==
In the early 1890s, Keane purchased 15 acres (61,000 m^{2}) of land at Cottesloe (now Peppermint Grove) adjoining the Swan River, surrounding a point in the river called Butler's Hump (now known as Keane's Point). A large home, Cappoquin House (named after Cappoquin, the Keane family's original residence in County Waterford, Ireland), was built at the site, with the family taking up residence in 1894. Lilla Keane lived at the house until her death in 1934, when it was bequeathed to the Royal Freshwater Bay Yacht Club for use as a clubhouse. The majority of the property surrounding the house was sold for development, with a small portion purchased by the Peppermint Grove Road District.

Keane was elected president of the Victorian Football Club, an Australian rules football club competing in the West Australian Football Association (WAFA), prior to the start of the 1886 season. The following season he relinquished his role as president to Hector Rason, and was made patron of the club, replacing Edward Scott. In May 1888, Keane was elected president of the league, necessitating him to relinquish his position at the Victorians.

In 1896, Keane, along with several local residents, agreed to form a sailing club based in Freshwater Bay, near his residence in Peppermint Grove. The Freshwater Bay Yacht Club first participated in races the following year, and later received a royal charter. Keane's old residence, Cappoquin House, is still used by the club as a clubhouse.
