= Kirrilee Warr =

Western Australian politician

Kirrilee Warr MLA

Member of the Western Australian Legislative Assembly for Geraldton
- Incumbent
- Assumed office 8 March 2025
- Preceded by: Lara Dalton

Personal details
- Party: National

Kirrilee Warr is an Australian politician from the National Party who is member of the Western Australian Legislative Assembly for the electoral district of Geraldton. She won her seat at the 2025 Western Australian state election unseating Labor MLA Lara Dalton.

She was a councillor and president of Shire of Chapman Valley. She previously worked at ATLAS and Disability Services Commission.

Western Australian Legislative Assembly
Preceded by Lara Dalton	Member for Geraldton; 2025–present	Incumbent
