= Bill Sewell (politician) =

Australian politician

Member of the Legislative Assembly of Western Australia
- In office 25 March 1950 – 30 March 1974
- Preceded by: Edmund Hall
- Succeeded by: Jeff Carr
- Constituency: Geraldton

Personal details
- Born: 7 February 1901 Beverley, Western Australia, Australia
- Died: 13 June 1980 (aged 79) Geraldton, Western Australia, Australia
- Party: Labor

William Hawkins Sewell (7 February 1901 – 13 June 1980) was an Australian politician who was a Labor Party member of the Legislative Assembly of Western Australia from 1950 to 1974, representing the seat of Geraldton.

Sewell was born in Beverley, a small town in Western Australia's Wheatbelt region. After leaving school, he worked as a shearer for a period, and later went to Geraldton, where he eventually became a works foreman for the Geraldton Municipality. A long-time member of the Australian Workers' Union (AWU) and the Labor Party, Sewell first stood for parliament at the 1946 Legislative Council elections, but was defeated in Central Province by the sitting Liberal member, Charles Simpson. The following year, he was selected as Labor's candidate for the Legislative Assembly seat of Geraldton at the 1947 state election. The retiring member was John Willcock, a former Labor premier. Sewell faced Liberal and Country Party opponents, and despite polling 47.7 percent on first-preference votes, could only poll 49.9 percent of the two-party-preferred vote, losing to Country candidate Edmund Hall.

At the 1950 state election, Sewell was again selected as the Labor candidate for Geraldton, and reversed the result from the previous contest, defeating Hall with 50.7 percent of the two-party-preferred vote. After the 1956 election, he was made deputy chairman of committees in the government of Albert Hawke. In November 1957, following Arthur Moir's elevation to the ministry, he was made chairman of committees, serving in the position until the Labor government's defeat at the 1959 election. Sewell remained in parliament until his retirement at the 1974 state election, after which he was replaced as the member for Geraldton by Jeff Carr. He died in Geraldton in June 1980, aged 79. Sewell had married Bridget Ethel Connolly (née Kempton), a widow, in January 1926, with whom he had two children.

Parliament of Western Australia
Preceded by Edmund Hall	Member for Geraldton; 1950–1974	Succeeded by Jeff Carr
