= Bob Bloffwitch =

Australian politician

Robert Clyde Bloffwitch (29 January 1944 – 25 January 2008) was an Australian politician for the Liberal Party.

== Biography ==
He was born in Subiaco and was a businessman in the automotive industry before entering politics. In 1991 he was elected to the Western Australian Legislative Assembly at the 1991 Geraldton by-election, winning the seat from the Labor Party. From 1992 to 1993 he was Shadow Minister for Mid West, and subsequently he was Government Whip from 1993 to 1997 and Deputy Speaker from 1997 to 2001, when he was defeated.

Bloffwitch died in January 2008, aged 63, having suffered from Alzheimer's disease for a long period before his death.

Western Australian Legislative Assembly
Preceded by Jeff Carr	Member for Geraldton; 1991–2001	Succeeded by Shane Hill
