= Lara Dalton =

Western Australian politician

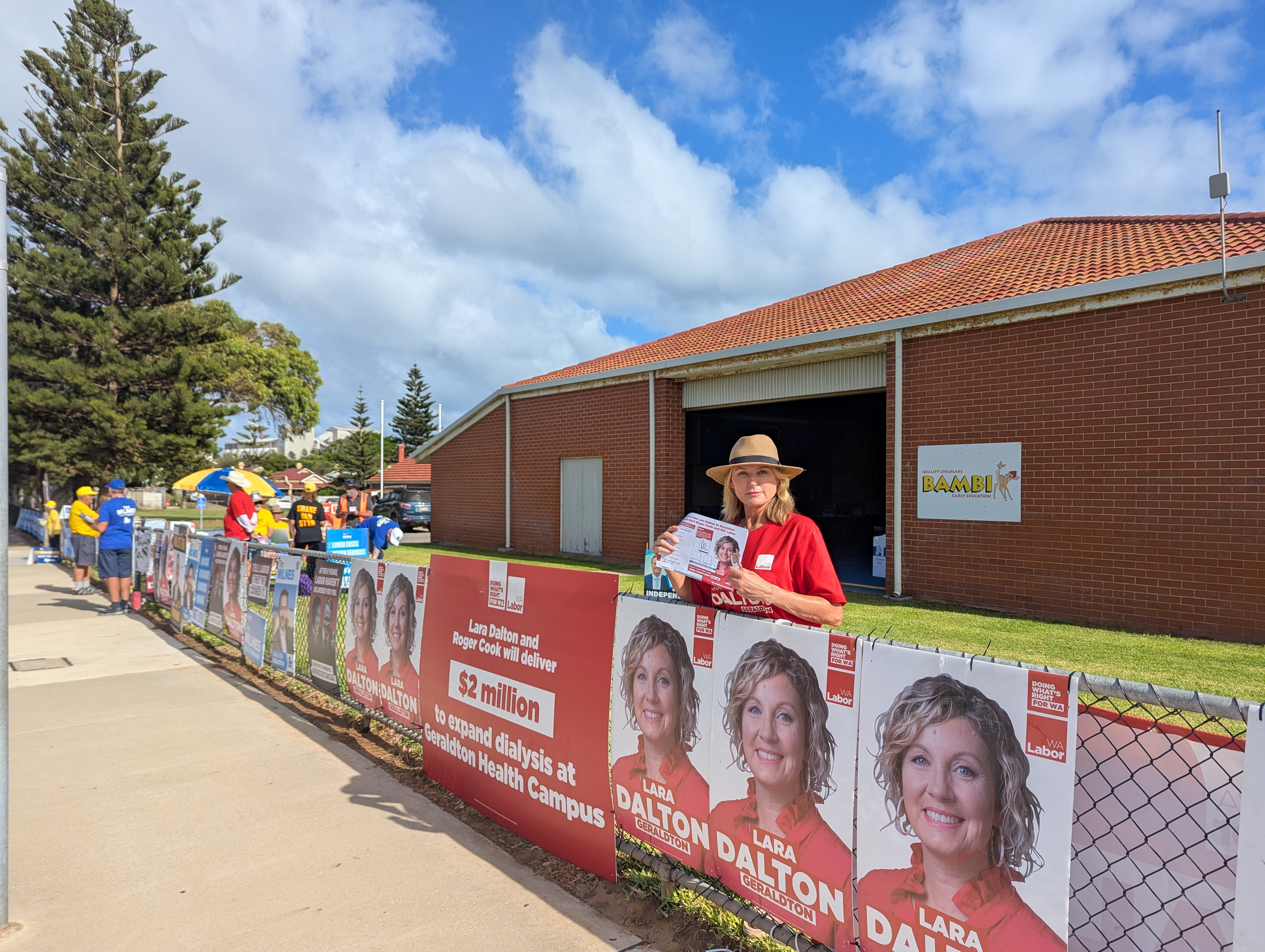
- Volunteers handing out for Lara Dalton during 2025 state election

Member of the Western Australian Legislative Assembly for Geraldton
- In office 13 March 2021 – 8 March 2025
- Preceded by: Ian Blayney
- Succeeded by: Kirrilee Warr

Personal details
- Born: 23 May 1970 (age 55) Geraldton, Western Australia
- Party: Labor
- Website: www.laradalton.com.au

Lara Dalton (born 23 May 1970) is an Australian politician. She was a Labor member of the Western Australian Legislative Assembly, representing Geraldton from 2021 to 2025.

Prior to entering politics, Dalton worked at the Geraldton campus of Central Regional TAFE, operated her own cafe, the Salt Dish Cafe, for five years, and then returned to TAFE as a hospitality lecturer. She was the Labor candidate for Geraldton at the 2017 state election. She was defeated by Ian Blayney, but reduced his margin to just 1.3%, recording a swing of 21.5%. She had actually led the field on the first count, but WA National and One Nation preferences proved too much for her to overcome.

Dalton was elected to the Legislative Assembly on her second attempt at the 2021 election, receiving 61.71% of the two-party preferred vote and comfortably defeating Blayney amidst a statewide Labor landslide. She actually won 54.7 percent of the primary vote, enough to win the seat on the first count. Her victory made her the first woman to represent Geraldton in its 131-year history. Dalton received mentoring during her election campaign from Victorian politician, Candy Broad, through EMILY's List Australia.

In the 2025 Western Australian state election, Dalton was unseated by National Party candidate Kirrilee Warr.

Western Australian Legislative Assembly
Preceded by Ian Blayney	Member for Geraldton; 2021–2025	Succeeded by Kirrilee Warr
