= Henry Carson =

Australian politician (1866–1948)

The Honourable Henry Carson

Member of the Legislative Assembly of Western Australia
- In office 4 June 1904 – 26 October 1906
- Preceded by: Robert Hutchinson
- Succeeded by: Thomas Brown
- Constituency: Geraldton
- In office 11 September 1908 – 3 October 1911
- Preceded by: Thomas Brown
- Succeeded by: Bronte Dooley
- Constituency: Geraldton

Member of the Legislative Council of Western Australia
- In office 22 May 1914 – 21 May 1920
- Preceded by: Con O'Brien
- Succeeded by: Thomas Moore
- Constituency: Central Province

Personal details
- Born: 31 December 1866 Guildford, Western Australia, Australia
- Died: 31 July 1948 (aged 81) Perth, Western Australia, Australia
- Party: Country (1914–1922)
- Other political affiliations: Independent (after 1922)

Henry Carson (31 December 1866 – 31 July 1948) was an Australian politician who served in both houses of the Parliament of Western Australia, as a member of the Legislative Assembly from 1904 to 1906 and from 1908 to 1911, and as a member of the Legislative Council from 1914 to 1920. He stood for parliament twelve times in total, but won election only four times.

Carson was born in Guildford, Western Australia, to Charlotte (née Hadley) and George Carson. Having previously worked as a draper, he was first elected to parliament at the 1904 state election, winning the seat of Geraldton. At the 1905 election, Carson was re-elected by a margin of six votes, defeating the Labor Party's Thomas Brown. However, in October 1906, following a petition, the election was vacated by the Supreme Court on the grounds of voting irregularities. The resulting by-election was won by Brown. From 1907 to 1908, Carson served on the Geraldton Municipal Council. He attempted to return to parliament at the 1908 Legislative Council election, but was defeated by Con O'Brien in Central Province on the casting vote of the returning officer.

At the 1908 state election later in the year, Carson reclaimed his former seat of Geraldton, although he held it for only a single term before being defeated again at the 1911 election. At the 1914 Legislative Council election, he won election to a six-year term in Central Province, as a member of the Country Party. Carson was defeated by Labor's Thomas Moore in his 1920 bid for re-election, and later recontested the seat in 1922 and 1926 without success. He also unsuccessfully stood for the seat of Irwin at the 1921 state election. Carson's final run for parliament came at the 1936 state election, where he was defeated by the sitting member, William Patrick, in the seat of Greenough. He died in Perth in July 1948, aged 81. He had married Mary Ryan in 1891, with whom he had five children.

Parliament of Western Australia
Preceded by Robert Hutchinson; Thomas Brown	Member for Geraldton; 1904–1905; 1908–1911	Succeeded by Thomas Brown; Bronte Dooley
