= Edward Heitmann =

Australian politician (1878-1934)

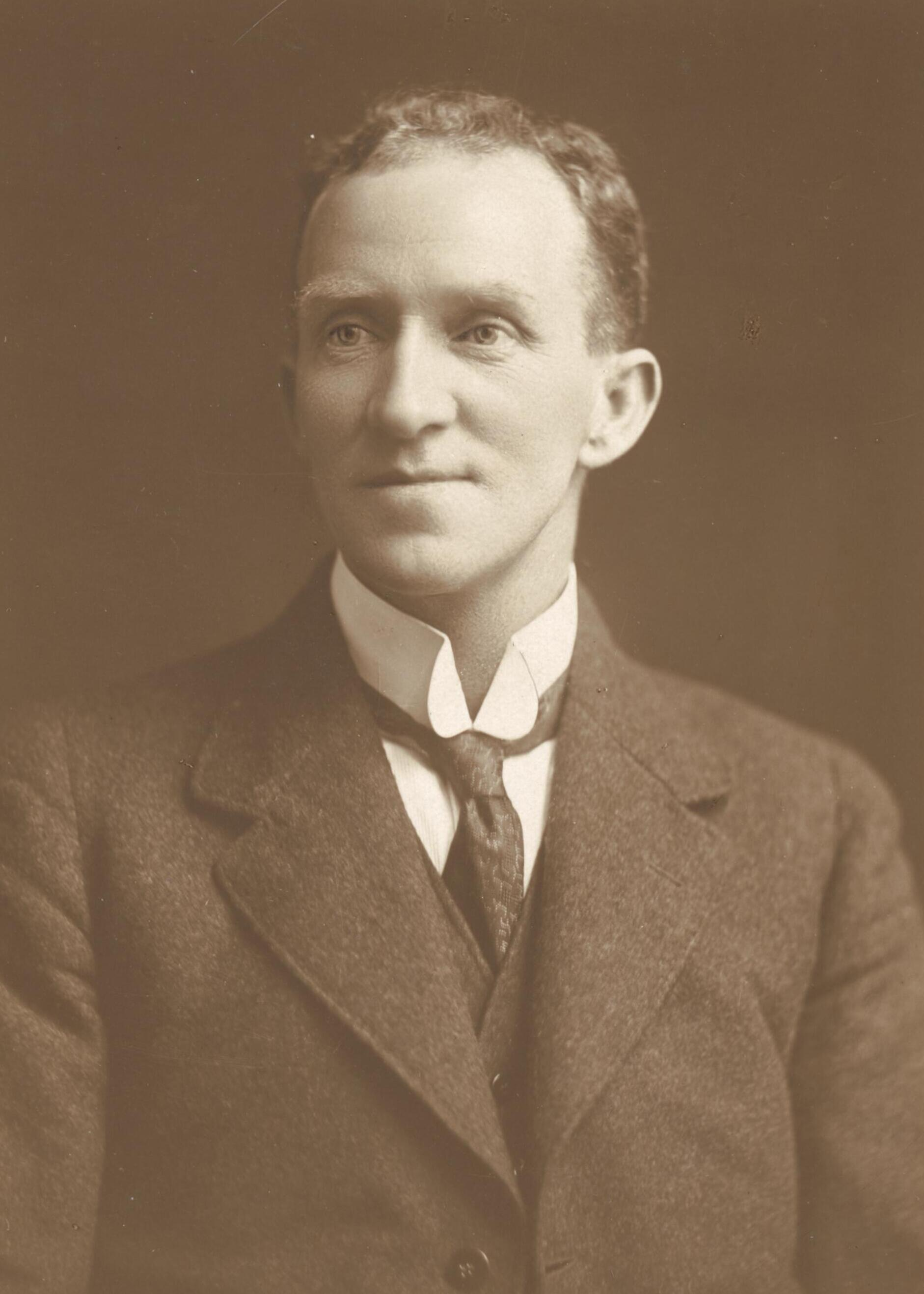

Member of the Australian Parliament for Kalgoorlie
- In office 5 May 1917 – 13 December 1919
- Preceded by: Hugh Mahon
- Succeeded by: Hugh Mahon

Member of the Western Australian Legislative Assembly
- In office 21 October 1914 – 20 March 1917
- Preceded by: Samuel Elliott
- Succeeded by: Samuel Elliott
- Constituency: Geraldton
- In office 24 June 1904 – 4 November 1913
- Preceded by: Frederick Illingworth
- Succeeded by: Thomas Chesson
- Constituency: Cue

Personal details
- Born: 3 June 1878 Bendigo, Victoria
- Died: 30 January 1934 (aged 55) Bendigo, Victoria
- Party: Labor (1904–17); Nationalist (1917–19)
- Spouse: Ada Maude Cooke
- Children: Jack Heitmann
- Occupation: Miner, unionist

Edward Ernest Heitmann (3 June 1878 – 30 January 1934), was an Australian politician and member of the Western Australian Legislative Assembly from 1904 to 1917, then a member of the Australian House of Representatives until 1919.

== Early life ==
Edward Heitmann was born in California Gully, Bendigo, Victoria on 3 June 1878. The son of carpenter and blacksmith Herman Heitmann and Katherine née Roberts, he was educated locally. He became a miner at an early age, eventually graduating to shaftsman before qualifying as a mine engine driver. In 1895 he moved to Western Australia but by the following year he had returned to Victoria, where took courses at the Bendigo School of Mines and Industries. On 29 June 1896 he married Emma Jane Johns; they had a son and two daughters before her death in 1905. In 1909 he married Ada Maude Cooke, with whom he had two sons and a daughter.

In 1899, Heitmann returned to Western Australia to work on the Murchison goldfields. He became increasingly involved in the Labor movement, becoming president of the Day Dawn Engine Drivers' Association, and organising secretary of the Australian Workers' Union.

== State politics ==
On 24 June 1904 he was elected to the Western Australian Legislative Assembly seat of Cue on a Labor ticket. He held the seat until 4 November 1913, resigning it to contest the seat of Geraldton in a by-election. Although he did not win the seat of Geraldton on this occasion, he had only eleven months to wait before winning the seat in the general election of 21 October 1914.

During his time as Member for Geraldton, Heitman was a member of the Western Australian Health Commission inquiring into Miners Phthisis, and he contributed to the establishment of a tuberculosis sanatorium at Wooroloo. Until 1917 he was one of the Scaddan government's main backbench critics, especially with regard to the 1916 Nevanas affair. In January 1917, he and Rufus Underwood attended a conference in Melbourne which aimed to merge Billy Hughes' National Labor Party with Joseph Cook's liberals.

== Federal politics ==
On 20 March, he resigned his Legislative Assembly seat in order to contest an Australian House of Representatives seat as a Nationalist. Shortly afterwards, the Western Australian branch of the Australian Labor Party followed its federal counterpart's lead in expelling its pro-conscription members, including Heitmann.

On 5 May 1917, Heitmann was elected to the Australian House of Representatives seat of Kalgoorlie. During the next two years he was in charge of transport arrangements for the demobilisation of the Australian Imperial Force. He was defeated in the federal election of 13 December 1919, and thereafter spent some time in Adelaide working in advertising.

== Later life ==
By 1921 Heitmann was farming at Laanecoorie, Victoria, and the following year contested the Victorian seat of Eaglehawk without success. In 1927 he returned to Bendigo, spending eighteen months as organisation secretary for the Advance Bendigo and the North League. In later life he suffered often from poor health, spending some time in the military hospital at Caulfield. He died at Bendigo on 30 January 1934, and was buried at Bendigo Cemetery. One of his nephews, Jack Heitman, was later a member of the Western Australian Legislative Council from 1963 until his death in 1977.

== General references ==
- Black, David; Bolton, Geoffrey (2001a). Biographical Register of Members of the Parliament of Western Australia. Vol. One: 1870–1930 (Revised ed.). Parliament House: Parliament of Western Australia. ISBN 0730738140.
- Black, David (1981). "Party Politics in Turmoil". In Stannage, Charles Thomas (ed.). A New History of Western Australia. Nedlands: UWA Publishing. ISBN 0-85564-181-9. LCCN 82101009. OCLC 963830667. OL 3517729M. Wikidata Q125995168.

Parliament of Australia
Preceded by Hugh Mahon	Member for Kalgoorlie; 1917–1919	Succeeded by Hugh Mahon
