= Thomas Leishman Brown =

Australian trade unionist and politician

Thomas Brown

Member of the Legislative Assembly of Western Australia
- In office 21 November 1906 – 11 September 1908
- Preceded by: Henry Carson
- Succeeded by: Henry Carson
- Constituency: Geraldton

Personal details
- Born: 5 November 1862 Bacchus Marsh, Victoria, Australia
- Died: July 1946 Zarate, Argentina
- Party: Labor

Thomas Leishman Brown (5 November 1862 – July 1946) was an Australian trade unionist and politician who served as a Labor Party member of the Legislative Assembly of Western Australia from 1906 to 1908, representing the seat of Geraldton.

Brown was born in Bacchus Marsh, Victoria, to Helen (née Leishman) and Thomas Brown. He trained as a carpenter and joiner, working in Melbourne until the mid-1890s, when he moved to Geraldton, Western Australia, and established his own building and contracting business. Brown unsuccessfully stood for parliament at the 1904 and 1905 state elections, losing to Henry Carson on both occasions. Carson's margin of victory in 1905 was just 26 votes, and in October 1906 the election was vacated by the Supreme Court on the grounds of voting irregularities. Brown won the resulting by-election, but Carson defeated him again at the 1908 state election. Brown made one final run for parliament in 1911, losing to Arthur Male in the seat of Kimberley. He was state secretary of the Australian Workers' Union from 1911 to 1915, when he left the state and did not return. Irregularities were subsequently discovered in the union's accounts. Brown left Australia in 1919 & went to Chile, South America with his wife & one daughter, joined shortly after by another daughter & grandson. Worked as a builder in Chile under the new name of Arthur Rivers.6

Parliament of Western Australia
Preceded by Henry Carson	Member for Geraldton; 1906–1908	Succeeded by Henry Carson
