= Electoral district of Geraldton =

State electoral district of Western Australia

Geraldton Western Australia—Legislative Assembly
- Interactive map of electoral district boundaries from the 2025 state election
- State: Western Australia
- Dates current: 1890–present
- MP: Kirrilee Warr
- Party: National
- Namesake: Geraldton
- Electors: 32,988 (2025)
- Area: 26,417 km^{2} (10,199.7 sq mi)
- Demographic: Provincial
- Coordinates: 28.76°S 114.66°E
Electorates around Geraldton:
Indian Ocean	Mid-West	Mid-West
Indian Ocean	Geraldton	Mid-West
Indian Ocean	Mid-West	Mid-West

Geraldton is an electoral district of the Legislative Assembly in the Australian state of Western Australia.

Geraldton was one of the original 30 seats contested at the 1890 colonial election. The district is based on the eponymous regional city.

Labor held throughout most of the twentieth century, Geraldton has since become a seat that has changed hands regularly in the last two decades.

== Geography ==
The district has always been based on the regional coastal city of Geraldton. Electoral reform ahead of the 2008 state election necessitated an increase in the district's enrolment and thus an expansion of its boundaries, as it did for all non-metropolitan districts. This means the district now includes all outlying suburbs of the city, as well as adjacent rural areas. The district's boundaries were identical with the former City of Geraldton-Greenough from 2008 to the 2021 election.

As of the 2025 state election, the district now contains the City of Greater Geraldton as well as the shires of Northampton and Chapman Valley. In addition to Geraldton city itself the district includes the towns of Kalbarri, Northampton, Nabawa and Mullewa.

== History ==
Geraldton changed hands frequently between different members and parties during the early history of the seat in the late 19th and early 20th century. After 1914 however, the seat was held by the Labor Party for all but three of the next 77 years. The seat's longest serving and most famous member was John Willcock, member from 1917 to 1947 and Premier of Western Australia from 1936 to 1945.

A fairly safe to safe Labor seat for much of the 20th century, it became somewhat less safe for Labor in the 1980s. The resignation of Labor member Jeff Carr following his sacking as minister in 1991 triggered a by-election that was won by the Liberal Party's Bob Bloffwitch, the seat's first non-Labor member in more than four decades. Bloffwitch held the seat at the subsequent 1993 state election, when the Liberal Party won government. The seat changed hands with the next change of government at the 2001 state election when Labor candidate Shane Hill was elected. Hill held the seat for two terms before Liberal Ian Blayney won it with a change of government at the 2008 state election. In fact the redistribution prior to that election had turned the seat into a notionally Liberal seat.

In 2013, Blayney seemingly consolidated his hold on the seat with Labor falling to third place behind the National Party. Blayney's margin was enough for him to narrowly overcome one of the biggest swings amid Labor's decisive victory at the subsequent election in 2017, with Labor's Lara Dalton paring back his margin from a seemingly insurmountable 22.8 percent to an extremely marginal 1.3 percent. Blayney's victory marked only the second time since World War I (Bloffwitch's 1991 by-election win being the first) that Labor had been in government without holding Geraldton. Blayney defected to the Nationals in 2019, but was heavily defeated by Dalton in 2021. Dalton actually won enough votes on the first count to take the seat outright.

== Members for Geraldton ==
Member	Party	Term
Edward Vivien Harvey Keane	Non-aligned	1890–1891
George Simpson	Opposition	1891–1899
Richard Robson	Independent	1899–1900
Robert Hutchinson	Opposition	1900–1904
Henry Carson	Ministerial	1904–1906
Thomas Brown	Labor	1906–1908
Henry Carson	Ministerial	1908–1911
Bronte Dooley	Labor	1911–1913
Samuel Elliott	Liberal	1913–1914
Edward Heitmann	Labor	1914–1917
Edward Heitmann	National Labor	1917
Samuel Elliott	Liberal	1917
John Willcock	Labor	1917–1947
Edmund Hall	Country	1947–1950
Bill Sewell	Labor	1950–1974
Jeff Carr	Labor	1974–1991
Bob Bloffwitch	Liberal	1991–2001
Shane Hill	Labor	2001–2008
Ian Blayney	Liberal	2008–2019
Ian Blayney	Independent	2019
Ian Blayney	National	2019–2021
Lara Dalton	Labor	2021–2025
Kirrilee Warr	National	2025–present

== Election results ==
2025 Western Australian state election: Geraldton
Party	Candidate	Votes	%	±%
National	Kirrilee Warr	7,452	28.4	+1.8
Labor	Lara Dalton	6,390	24.3	−28.0
Independent	Shane van Styn	5,339	20.3	+20.3
Liberal	Tim Milnes	4,212	16.0	+3.3
Greens	Madeline Doncon	994	3.8	+1.2
Legalise Cannabis	David Van Beek	594	2.3	+2.3
Christians	Eugenie Harris	571	2.2	+2.2
Independent	Aaron Horsman	468	1.8	+1.8
Shooters, Fishers, Farmers	Jack Ostle	241	0.9	−1.1
Total formal votes		26,261	96.0	−0.5
Informal votes		1,090	4.0	+0.5
Turnout		27,351	82.9	+3.7
Two-candidate-preferred result
National	Kirrilee Warr	16,812	64.1	+64.1
Labor	Lara Dalton	9,414	35.9	−23.4
National gain from Labor				
