= Richard Robson (politician) =

Australian politician

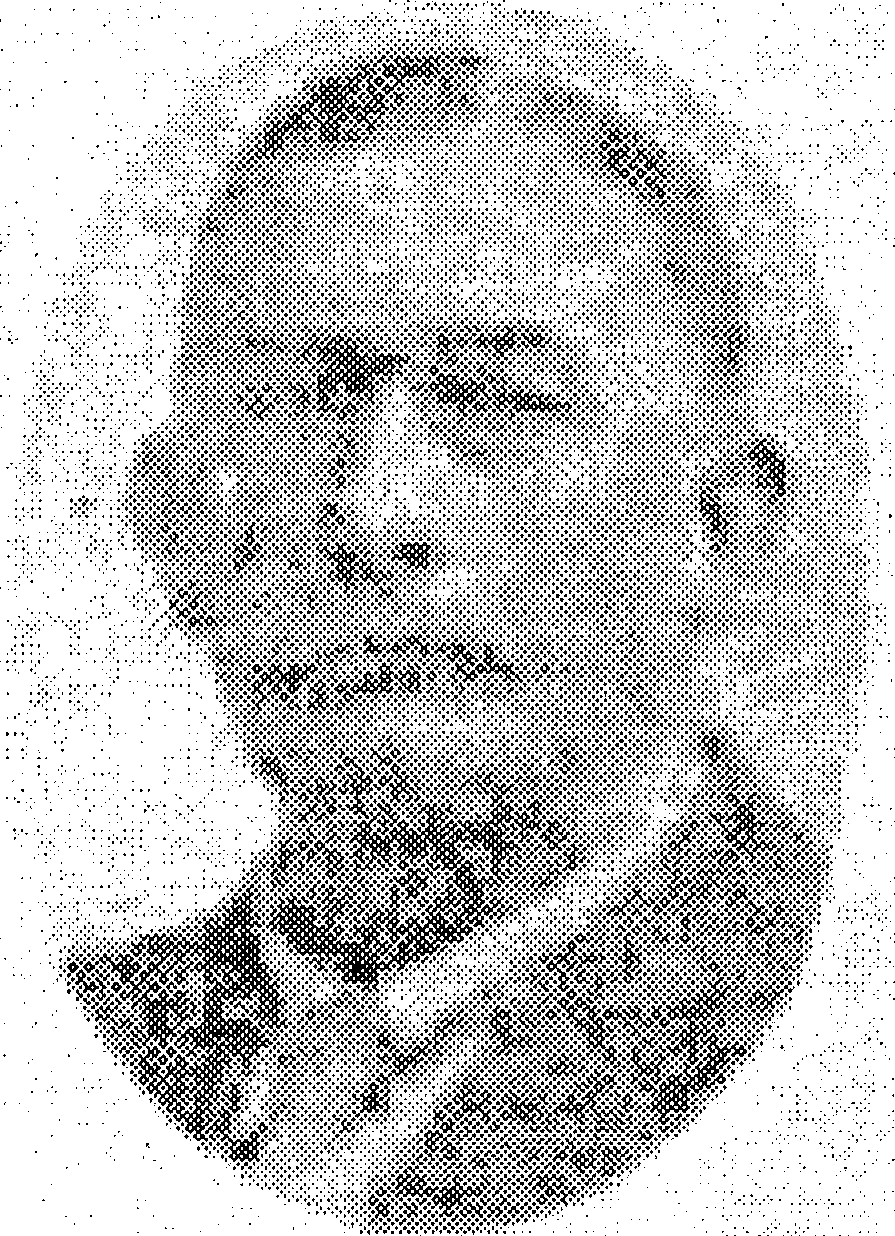
Richard 'Dick' Robson

Richard Robson (15 March 1867 – 30 November 1928) was a member of the Western Australian Legislative Assembly who resigned in 1900, after making unsubstantiated allegations of corruption against the government of the day.

== Early life ==
Richard Robson was born at Tynemouth, Northumberland, England on 15 March 1867. He was educated at Mill Hill School in London. In 1887 he emigrated to Western Australia, working as a jackaroo in the Murchison district until after 1890. By 1895 he was in business at Geraldton as a commission and mining agent. That year he married Clara Hosken; they had five children. In 1898 he was vice-President of the Geraldton Chamber of Commerce.

== Political life ==
On 12 July 1899, Robson was elected to the Legislative Assembly seat of Geraldton in the by-election caused by the forced resignation of George Simpson (who had been declared bankrupt). In February 1900, the Geraldton Advertiser reported on a speech made by Robson to a meeting of his constituents. Robson was reported as claiming that bribery and corruption were rampant in parliament; that the Forrest Ministry was "corrupt and rotten to the core"; and that several members had "no visible means of support" because they were paid by a group of financiers who wanted to keep the Government in office. The allegations were raised in the Assembly by Frederick Moorhead when it next sat on 23 May. The premier, John Forrest, who had been deeply offended by Robson's reported statements, declared that the charges had impugned his personal honour and integrity, and demanded that they either be substantiated or withdrawn. The Assembly then resolved that Robson, who was absent from the House, should attend on 29 May to explain his reported statements. Robson attended on that date, making a speech in which denied that he had attacked the character of any member, and submitted that he was responsible for his statements "only to those whom I represent". He then unsuccessfully moved for the establishment of an impartial tribunal in investigate his claims.

The following day, the House resolved that Robson's charges did indeed "constitute a reflection upon the honour of members of the House". A select committee was then appointed to inquire into the truth of Robson's allegations. The committee met early in June, and heard from Robson and several other witnesses. Robson named five members who appeared to be "without visible means of support", and Forrest was interrogated by Robson's legal counsel, but nothing new emerged except the fact that one of the three government whips, Cornthwaite Rason, was paid an allowance out of the ministers' salaries. Robson's defence was that his allegations of corruption should not be interpreted as allegations against any individuals, but rather as allegations of general maladministration and disregard for the principles of good government. The select committee's report, presented on 13 June, found that Robson's statements reflected on the character of members, and found no evidence of the alleged corruption. The question of the validity of Robson's defence was left to the House.

Following the presentation of the committee's report, Charles Moran gave notice of motion for the following day, declaring that Robson should be censured by the Speaker unless he gave an "unqualified withdrawal of the charges". Robson then withdrew the charges, apologised unreservedly to the House and to any individuals who had felt themselves affected by his statements, and resigned as a Member of the Legislative Assembly. The following day, the Leader of the Opposition, George Leake, read a letter written to the House by Robson as a private citizen; in it, Robson admitted that he ought not to have made references to members being without visible means of support, but added "I was justified in saying that the Government was rotten and corrupt, and that statement I have not withdrawn". The House then resolved that Robson's comments had been "a grave breach" of parliamentary privilege, but since he had withdrawn the statements, and apologised, and resigned, no further action would be taken. The statement that Robson's comments were a breach of parliamentary privilege was not correct, as his comments were made outside Parliament, and were therefore not under the protection of parliamentary privilege. He could conceivably have been sued by those members who felt they had been slandered, but this course of action seems not to have been considered at any stage.

== Later life ==
In 1900, Robson enlisted to serve in the Second Boer War. As a captain, he led the first Australian contingent of mounted infantry. After the end of the war, he stayed in South Africa as Commandant of the South African Constabulary in the Standarton district. A recipient of the Queen's Medal (three bars), he was Justice of the Peace for Bethel district from 1901 to 1907. In 1907, Robson returned to England and settled at Newcastle upon Tyne, where he worked as a removalist and cabinet maker in partnership with his brother. He later became director of Robson and Sons Ltd., cabinet makers and upholsterers. He died at sea on 30 November 1928, while en route to Australia.
