= Ian Blayney =

Australian politician

Member of the Western Australian Legislative Assembly for Geraldton
- In office 6 September 2008 – 13 March 2021
- Preceded by: Shane Hill
- Succeeded by: Lara Dalton

Personal details
- Born: 2 February 1962 (age 64) Geraldton, Western Australia
- Party: National (from August 2019)
- Other political affiliations: Liberal Party (until July 2019)

Ian Charles Blayney (born 2 February 1962) is an Australian politician. He was born in Geraldton, Western Australia, and holds an Associate Diploma of Agriculture.

Blayney became a member of the Western Australian Legislative Assembly at the 2008 state election, representing Geraldton. He won the seat as a Liberal Party candidate, defeating sitting Labor member Shane Hill, after a redistribution had made the seat notionally Liberal.

Blayney was comfortably re-elected in 2013, but faced a closer-than-expected contest in 2017 against Labor candidate Lara Dalton. He went into the election with a seemingly insurmountable margin of 22.8 percent in a "traditional" two-party-preferred contest with Labor, but suffered a swing of 21.5 percent, paring back his margin to a narrow 1.3 percent. He trailed Dalton by 1,300 votes on the first count, but was elected on WA National and One Nation preferences.

On 24 July 2019, Blayney announced that he had resigned from the Liberal Party, and applied to join the WA Nationals. The move came after he lost his post as shadow agriculture minister in a reshuffle, but Blayney claimed it had "not greatly" affected his thinking. He was accepted into the National Party by their leader, Mia Davies, on 17 August 2019. Dalton sought a rematch with Blayney at the 2021 election, and handily defeated him, amid Labor's decisive victory that year.

Blayney stood unsuccessfully for the House of Representatives at the 2022 federal election, losing to the incumbent Liberal MP Melissa Price in the seat of Durack.

Western Australian Legislative Assembly
Preceded by Shane Hill	Member for Geraldton; 2008–2021	Succeeded by Lara Dalton
