= Shane Hill =

Australian politician (1965–2025)

Member of the Western Australian Legislative Assembly for Geraldton
- In office 10 February 2001 – 6 September 2008
- Preceded by: Bob Bloffwitch
- Succeeded by: Ian Blayney

Personal details
- Born: 2 December 1965 Kalgoorlie, Western Australia
- Died: 21 November 2025 (aged 59)
- Party: Labor Party
- Occupation: Public servant

Shane Robin Hill (2 December 1965 – 21 November 2025) was an Australian politician. He represented the electorate of Geraldton in the Western Australian Legislative Assembly from the 2001 election for the Labor Party until losing the seat in the 2008 election.

Hill defeated the sitting Liberal member, Bob Bloffwitch, in the 2001 state election. In the 2005 state election Hill held the seat by a margin of 2.7%.

Hill was a member of the standing committee for Health and Education from 2001 to 2005. He has also been a member of the Joint Parliamentary Services Committee since 2001 and a member of the Community Development and Justice Standing Committee since 2005.

In 2006, Hill was appointed to be the Government Whip of the Legislative Assembly.

In the 2008 election, Hill's seat was significantly altered. He'd previously held one of Labor's more marginal seats, but the redistribution gave the Liberals a notional three-percent majority. He was soundly defeated by Liberal challenger Ian Blayney.

Hill was preselected as the Labor candidate for Durack at the 2010 federal election, at which he was unsuccessful, and was also unsuccessful as the Labor candidate for North West Central at the 2017 state election.

Hill died unexpectedly in his sleep on 21 November 2025.

Western Australian Legislative Assembly
Preceded by Bob Bloffwitch	Member for Geraldton; 2001–2008	Succeeded by Ian Blayney
