= Results of the 2021 Western Australian state election (Legislative Assembly) =

2021 Western Australian state election
- 13 March 2021

All 59 seats in the Western Australian Legislative Assembly 30 seats needed for a majority
- Opinion polls
- Turnout: 1,467,159 (85.46%)
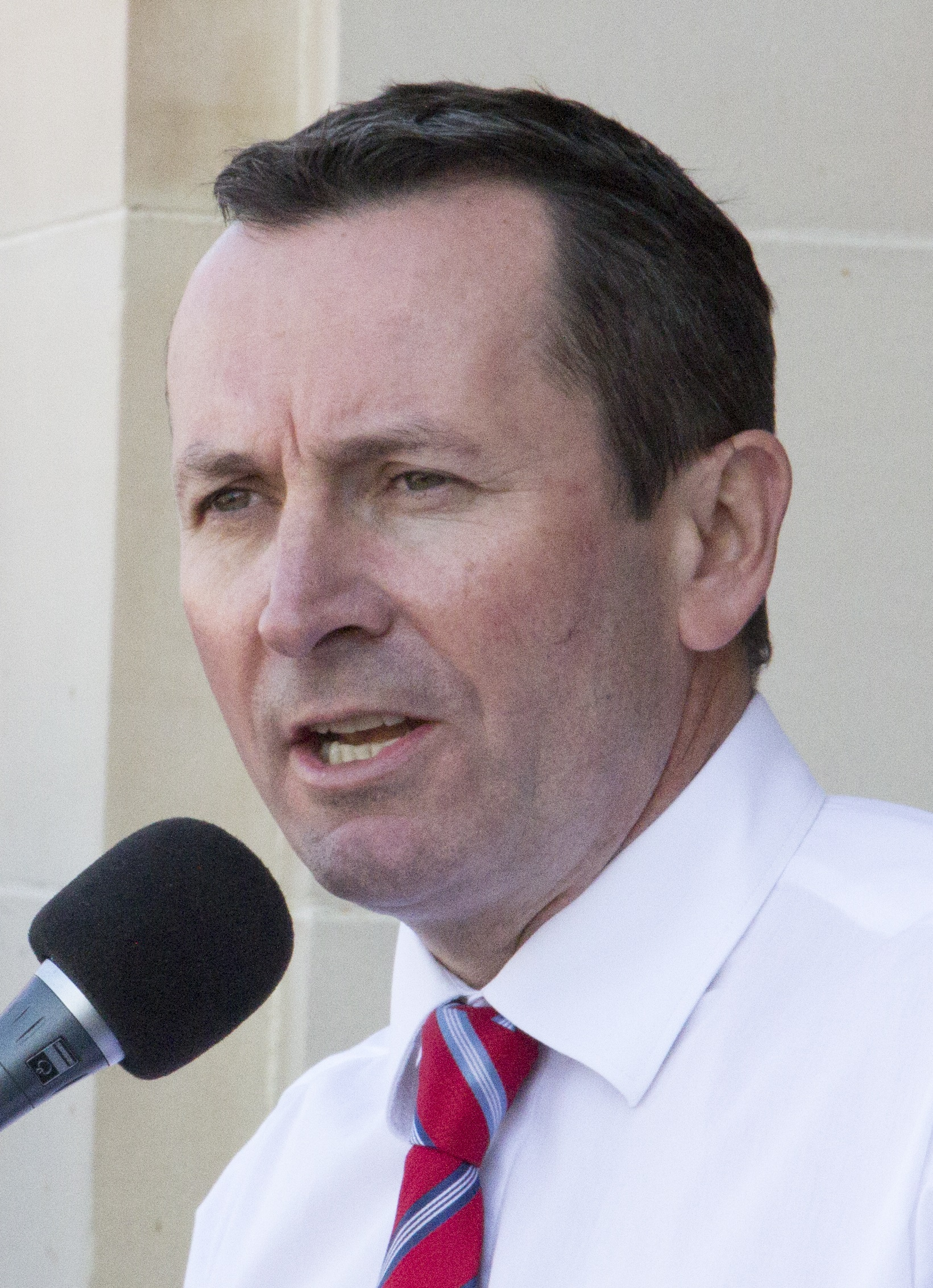
	First party	Second party	Third party
			LIB
Leader	Mark McGowan	Mia Davies	Zak Kirkup
Party	Labor	National	Liberal
Leader since	23 January 2012	21 March 2017	24 November 2020
Leader's seat	Rockingham	Central Wheatbelt	Dawesville (lost seat)
Last election	41 seats	5 seats	13 seats
Seats before	40 seats	6 seats	13 seats
Seats won	53 seats	4 seats	2 seats
Seat change	▲13	▼2	▼11
First preference vote	846,116	56,448	300,796
Percentage	59.9%	4.0%	21.3%
Swing	▲17.7%	▼1.4%	▼9.9%
2PP	69.7%		30.3%
2PP swing	▲14.1%		▼14.1%
- Left: first preference vote by electorate. Right: two-party-preferred vote by electorate.
Premier before election
Mark McGowan
Labor
Elected Premier
Mark McGowan
Labor

This is a list of electoral district results of the 2021 Western Australian election.

Percentages, margins and swings are calculated on notional estimates based on analysis of the redistributed electoral boundaries by the ABC's Antony Green for the Western Australian Parliamentary Library.

== Statewide results ==
Government (53) Labor (53) Opposition (6) National (4) Liberal (2)

Winning party by electorate.

Legislative Assembly (IRV) – Turnout 85.46% (CV)
Party	Votes	%	Swing	Seats	+/–
Labor	846,116	59.92	▲17.72	53	▲13
Liberal	300,796	21.30	▼9.92	2	▼11
Greens	97,713	6.92	▼1.99	0	Steady
Nationals	56,448	4.00	▼1.40	4	▼2
No Mandatory Vaccination	23,178	1.64	New	0	Steady
Australian Christians	20,869	1.48	▼0.62	0	Steady
One Nation	17,824	1.26	▼3.67	0	Steady
Shooters, Fishers, Farmers	9,669	0.69	▼0.62	0	Steady
WAxit	7,984	0.57	▼0.43	0	Steady
Liberal Democrats	7,159	0.51	▲0.46	0	Steady
Western Australia	5,276	0.37	▼0.09	0	Steady
Legalise Cannabis	4,996	0.35	New	0	Steady
Sustainable Australia	1,356	0.10	New	0	Steady
Socialist Alliance	726	0.05	0	0	Steady
Liberals for Climate	552	0.04	▼0.13	0	Steady
Independents	11,328	0.80	▼1.04	0	Steady
Formal votes	1,411,990	96.24	▲0.78		
Informal votes	55,169	3.76	▼0.78		
Total	1,467,159			59	
Registered voters / turnout	1,716,732	85.46	▼2.06		
Two-party-preferred vote
Labor	983,299	69.68	▲14.14		
Liberal/Nationals	427,812	30.32	▼14.14		

Although the Liberals and Nationals did not contest the election as a coalition and are separate parties, the two-party-preferred calculation aggregates Labor/Liberal and Labor/Nationals contests.

== Results by electoral district ==
=== Albany ===
2021 Western Australian state election: Albany
Party	Candidate	Votes	%	±%
Labor	Rebecca Stephens	11,804	50.8	+6.2
Liberal	Scott Leary	4,236	18.2	+0.9
National	Delma Baesjou	2,480	10.7	−9.0
Greens	Nelson Gilmour	1,310	5.6	−1.0
Christians	Ian 't Hart	1,246	5.4	+0.3
One Nation	Michelle Kinsella	602	2.6	−4.2
Shooters, Fishers, Farmers	Karrie Louden	459	2.0	+2.0
Legalise Cannabis	Caroline Cull	417	1.8	+1.8
No Mandatory Vaccination	Sandra Madeo	325	1.4	+1.4
Liberal Democrats	Malcolm Dodson	170	0.7	+0.7
Sustainable Australia	Barry Purcell	143	0.6	+0.6
WAxit	Emil Bacanaru	47	0.2	+0.2
Total formal votes		23,239	96.7	+0.1
Informal votes		799	3.3	−0.1
Turnout		24,038	87.5	−1.8
Two-party-preferred result
Labor	Rebecca Stephens	14,780	63.7	+7.8
Liberal	Scott Leary	8,432	36.3	+36.3
Labor hold				

=== Armadale ===
2021 Western Australian state election: Armadale
Party	Candidate	Votes	%	±%
Labor	Tony Buti	18,434	74.4	+7.7
Liberal	Mahesh Arumugam	1,859	7.5	−9.3
Christians	Arthur Kleyn	1,424	5.7	−0.6
Greens	Jessica Openshaw	1,135	4.6	−1.9
One Nation	Jayden Carr	682	2.8	+2.8
Western Australia	Blake Clarke	649	2.6	+2.6
No Mandatory Vaccination	Lisa Moody	417	1.7	+1.7
WAxit	Eby Mathew	171	0.7	+0.7
Total formal votes		24,771	95.3	+0.8
Informal votes		1,229	4.7	−0.8
Turnout		26,000	80.7	−0.6
Two-party-preferred result
Labor	Tony Buti	21,159	85.5	+10.3
Liberal	Mahesh Arumugam	3,597	14.5	−10.3
Labor hold		Swing	+10.3	

=== Balcatta ===
2021 Western Australian state election: Balcatta
Party	Candidate	Votes	%	±%
Labor	David Michael	15,894	66.5	+19.9
Liberal	Wayne Evans	4,497	18.8	−17.3
Greens	Benedict Guinery	1,818	7.6	−2.7
Christians	Rose Anderson	504	2.1	−1.1
Liberal Democrats	Damian Coletta	489	2.0	+1.2
No Mandatory Vaccination	Daniel Thornton	453	1.9	+1.9
WAxit	Domenic Staltari	238	1.0	+1.0
Total formal votes		23,893	95.1	+1.6
Informal votes		1,222	4.9	−1.6
Turnout		25,115	85.0	−1.6
Two-party-preferred result
Labor	David Michael	18,087	75.8	+17.7
Liberal	Wayne Evans	5,790	24.2	−17.7
Labor hold		Swing	+17.7	

=== Baldivis ===
2021 Western Australian state election: Baldivis
Party	Candidate	Votes	%	±%
Labor	Reece Whitby	21,130	79.8	+37.0
Liberal	Luke Derrick	2,122	8.0	−6.4
Greens	Jody Freeman	1,037	3.9	−1.3
Independent	Andrea Tokaji	932	3.5	+3.5
One Nation	Martin Suter	464	1.8	−5.8
No Mandatory Vaccination	Chaz Rizzo	333	1.3	+1.3
Liberal Democrats	David Marshall	321	1.2	+1.2
WAxit	Brianna McLernon	149	0.6	+0.6
Total formal votes		26,488	96.6	+1.0
Informal votes		924	3.4	−1.0
Turnout		27,412	84.2	+10.9
Two-party-preferred result
Labor	Reece Whitby	23,013	86.9	+20.3
Liberal	Luke Derrick	3,469	13.1	−20.3
Labor hold		Swing	+20.3	

=== Bassendean ===
2021 Western Australian state election: Bassendean
Party	Candidate	Votes	%	±%
Labor	Dave Kelly	17,094	70.7	+11.2
Liberal	Felicia Adeniyi	2,954	12.2	−10.7
Greens	Charles Pratt	2,005	8.3	−2.6
Christians	Dean Powell	705	2.9	−0.3
No Mandatory Vaccination	Leni Erceg	685	2.8	+2.8
One Nation	Lesley Pallister	486	2.0	+1.7
WAxit	Peter Martin	265	1.1	−1.6
Total formal votes		24,194	95.4	+1.5
Informal votes		1,172	4.6	−1.5
Turnout		25,366	86.0	−2.8
Two-party-preferred result
Labor	Dave Kelly	19,727	81.6	+10.0
Liberal	Felicia Adeniyi	4,452	18.4	−10.0
Labor hold		Swing	+10.0	

=== Bateman ===
2021 Western Australian state election: Bateman
Party	Candidate	Votes	%	±%
Labor	Kim Giddens	12,106	45.8	+15.5
Liberal	Matt Woodall	9,762	37.0	−12.8
Greens	Adam Abdul Razak	1,815	6.9	−3.5
Independent	Steve Kepert	856	3.2	+3.2
Christians	Fiona McKenzie-Brown	774	2.9	−0.2
Liberal Democrats	Gregory Leech	341	1.3	+1.3
No Mandatory Vaccination	Christina Tseng	314	1.2	+1.2
Western Australia	Bill Koul	228	0.9	+0.1
One Nation	Barry Mason	213	0.8	−3.2
Total formal votes		26,409	97.2	+0.7
Informal votes		762	2.8	−0.7
Turnout		27,171	89.6	−1.3
Two-party-preferred result
Labor	Kim Giddens	14,963	56.7	+14.5
Liberal	Matt Woodall	11,436	43.3	−14.5
Labor gain from Liberal		Swing	+14.5	

=== Belmont ===
2021 Western Australian state election: Belmont
Party	Candidate	Votes	%	±%
Labor	Cassie Rowe	16,722	70.4	+21.3
Liberal	Charlotte Butler	3,819	16.1	−14.2
Greens	Clint Uink	1,651	7.0	−0.6
Christians	Nitasha Naidu	566	2.4	+0.5
One Nation	Chris Fenech	433	1.8	−4.7
No Mandatory Vaccination	Shaun Rose	374	1.6	+1.6
WAxit	Mohammed Boksmati	174	0.7	−0.6
Total formal votes		23,739	95.9	+1.1
Informal votes		1,019	4.1	−1.1
Turnout		24,758	82.5	+1.2
Two-party-preferred result
Labor	Cassie Rowe	18,795	79.2	+17.8
Liberal	Charlotte Butler	4,938	20.8	−17.8
Labor hold		Swing	+17.8	

=== Bicton ===
2021 Western Australian state election: Bicton
Party	Candidate	Votes	%	±%
Labor	Lisa O'Malley	13,556	55.1	+15.2
Liberal	Nicole Robins	7,559	30.7	−11.6
Greens	Annie Hill Otness	2,450	10.0	−1.1
One Nation	Jonathon Graham	297	1.2	+1.2
No Mandatory Vaccination	Silvia Hirsbrunner	293	1.2	+1.2
Liberal Democrats	Michael Prinz	267	1.1	+1.1
Christians	Deonne Kingsford	185	0.8	−0.3
Total formal votes		24,607	97.5	+0.5
Informal votes		628	2.5	−0.5
Turnout		25,235	89.2	−0.3
Two-party-preferred result
Labor	Lisa O'Malley	16,136	65.6	+11.9
Liberal	Nicole Robins	8,466	34.4	−11.9
Labor hold		Swing	+11.9	

=== Bunbury ===
2021 Western Australian state election: Bunbury
Party	Candidate	Votes	%	±%
Labor	Don Punch	14,791	60.5	+16.9
Liberal	Matt Foreman	4,604	18.8	−3.6
Greens	Patricia Perks	1,170	4.8	−2.0
National	Codee-Lee Down	1,081	4.4	−9.4
One Nation	Gail Jones	656	2.7	−6.2
Shooters, Fishers, Farmers	Shane Hastie	615	2.5	−1.0
Legalise Cannabis	Kelly Hibbert	582	2.4	+2.4
Western Australia	Kieran Noonan	415	1.7	+1.7
No Mandatory Vaccination	Anthony Merrifield	348	1.4	+1.4
Sustainable Australia	James Minson	158	0.6	+0.6
WAxit	Dan Acatinca	43	0.2	−0.1
Total formal votes		24,463	95.5	+0.2
Informal votes		1,163	4.5	−0.2
Turnout		25,626	84.1	−2.0
Two-party-preferred result
Labor	Don Punch	17,730	72.5	+12.0
Liberal	Matt Foreman	6,719	27.5	−12.0
Labor hold		Swing	+12.0	

=== Burns Beach ===
2021 Western Australian state election: Burns Beach
Party	Candidate	Votes	%	±%
Labor	Mark Folkard	17,193	70.1	+25.8
Liberal	Trish Botha	4,545	18.5	−19.0
Greens	Louis Marchant	1,355	5.5	−3.6
Christians	Graeme Offereins	625	2.5	+0.5
No Mandatory Vaccination	Meredith Campbell	585	2.4	+2.4
WAxit	Peter Rosengrave	223	0.9	−0.3
Total formal votes		24,526	96.4	+1.7
Informal votes		916	3.6	−1.7
Turnout		25,442	84.9	+1.3
Two-party-preferred result
Labor	Mark Folkard	18,849	76.9	+21.5
Liberal	Trish Botha	5,669	23.1	−21.5
Labor hold		Swing	+21.5	

=== Butler ===
2021 Western Australian state election: Butler
Party	Candidate	Votes	%	±%
Labor	John Quigley	19,806	77.0	+19.4
Liberal	Linda Aitken	3,565	13.9	−6.3
Greens	Elizabeth Kamara	1,037	4.0	−2.3
No Mandatory Vaccination	P. Becker	609	2.4	+2.4
Christians	Katrina Hildebrandt	542	2.1	+0.4
WAxit	Raj Bawa	178	0.7	−0.2
Total formal votes		25,737	96.2	+1.1
Informal votes		1,014	3.8	−1.1
Turnout		26,751	81.8	+9.6
Two-party-preferred result
Labor	John Quigley	21,168	82.2	+11.7
Liberal	Linda Aitken	4,569	17.8	−11.7
Labor hold		Swing	+11.7	

=== Cannington ===
2021 Western Australian state election: Cannington
Party	Candidate	Votes	%	±%
Labor	Bill Johnston	16,884	71.8	+17.3
Liberal	Bruce Henderson	3,059	13.0	−11.1
Greens	River Clarke	1,476	6.3	−2.8
Christians	Mark Staer	1,092	4.6	+0.9
One Nation	Gabrielle Iriks	385	1.6	−4.5
Liberal Democrats	Eric Ondra	304	1.3	+1.3
No Mandatory Vaccination	June Cahill	302	1.3	+1.3
Total formal votes		23,502	96.2	+1.1
Informal votes		927	3.8	−1.1
Turnout		24,429	83.9	+0.8
Two-party-preferred result
Labor	Bill Johnston	18,899	80.4	+12.9
Liberal	Bruce Henderson	4,596	19.6	−12.9
Labor hold		Swing	+12.9	

=== Carine ===
2021 Western Australian state election: Carine
Party	Candidate	Votes	%	±%
Liberal	Tony Krsticevic	12,012	44.4	−5.8
Labor	Paul Lilburne	11,993	44.3	+17.1
Greens	Nicholas D'Alonzo	2,369	8.8	−1.7
No Mandatory Vaccination	A. Cox	490	1.8	+1.8
WAxit	Marilyn Tringas	197	0.7	−0.7
Total formal votes		27,061	97.2	+0.8
Informal votes		793	2.8	−0.8
Turnout		27,854	90.7	−3.1
Two-party-preferred result
Labor	Paul Lilburne	14,195	52.5	+12.7
Liberal	Tony Krsticevic	12,864	47.5	−12.7
Labor gain from Liberal		Swing	+12.7	

=== Central Wheatbelt ===
2021 Western Australian state election: Central Wheatbelt
Party	Candidate	Votes	%	±%
National	Mia Davies	10,101	47.5	+1.4
Labor	Michelle Nelson	7,191	33.8	+14.3
Liberal	Rob Forster	1,762	8.3	−3.3
Shooters, Fishers, Farmers	Stuart Singleton	739	3.5	−1.8
Christians	Dennis Pease	427	2.0	−0.1
One Nation	Shaun Reid	405	1.9	−9.6
Greens	Annabelle Newbury	388	1.8	−1.3
No Mandatory Vaccination	Brendon Cahill	179	0.8	+0.8
WAxit	Estelle Gom	70	0.3	+0.3
Total formal votes		21,262	95.8	−0.3
Informal votes		938	4.2	+0.3
Turnout		22,200	85.8	−3.9
Two-candidate-preferred result
National	Mia Davies	12,901	60.7	−11.5
Labor	Michelle Nelson	8,357	39.3	+11.5
National hold		Swing	−11.5	

=== Churchlands ===
2021 Western Australian state election: Churchlands
Party	Candidate	Votes	%	±%
Liberal	Sean L'Estrange	11,087	43.9	−9.2
Labor	Christine Tonkin	9,938	39.4	+15.8
Greens	Mark Twiss	2,640	10.5	−3.6
Independent	Jim Bivoltsis	714	2.8	−1.3
Christians	Ray Moran	394	1.6	−0.5
No Mandatory Vaccination	L. Pearce	320	1.3	+1.3
WAxit	Alexandra Farsalas	146	0.6	−0.9
Total formal votes		25,239	97.5	+0.7
Informal votes		650	2.5	−0.7
Turnout		25,889	89.0	+0.1
Two-party-preferred result
Labor	Christine Tonkin	12,821	50.8	+12.5
Liberal	Sean L'Estrange	12,413	49.2	−12.5
Labor gain from Liberal		Swing	+12.5	

=== Cockburn ===
2021 Western Australian state election: Cockburn
Party	Candidate	Votes	%	±%
Labor	David Scaife	17,714	68.4	+16.7
Liberal	Owen Mulder	4,822	18.6	−9.8
Greens	Jesse Smith	1,655	6.4	−2.5
No Mandatory Vaccination	Elspeth Taimre	461	1.8	+1.8
One Nation	Igor Mironenko	456	1.8	−0.1
WAxit	Andrew Baker	426	1.6	+0.4
Liberal Democrats	Brian Murray	374	1.4	+1.4
Total formal votes		25,908	96.3	+1.4
Informal votes		995	3.7	−1.4
Turnout		26,903	87.4	+1.1
Two-party-preferred result
Labor	David Scaife	19,870	76.7	+12.4
Liberal	Owen Mulder	6,024	23.3	−12.4
Labor hold		Swing	+12.4	

=== Collie-Preston ===
2021 Western Australian state election: Collie-Preston
Party	Candidate	Votes	%	±%
Labor	Jodie Hanns	16,085	62.2	+12.3
Liberal	Jane Goff	3,778	14.6	−3.3
National	Wayne Sanford	2,245	8.7	−4.3
Greens	Gordon Scantlebury	889	3.4	−0.9
Shooters, Fishers, Farmers	Clinton Thomas	773	3.0	−0.9
One Nation	Michael Williams	533	2.1	−6.6
No Mandatory Vaccination	Christine Merrifield	487	1.9	+1.9
Legalise Cannabis	Emily Wilkinson	458	1.8	+1.8
Independent	Russell Sheridan	385	1.5	+1.5
Sustainable Australia	Graham Butler	149	0.6	+0.6
WAxit	Jackie Tomic	71	0.3	+0.3
Total formal votes		25,853	96.0	+0.2
Informal votes		1,082	4.0	−0.2
Turnout		26,935	87.6	+1.2
Two-party-preferred result
Labor	Jodie Hanns	18,963	73.4	+8.7
Liberal	Jane Goff	6,879	26.6	−8.7
Labor hold		Swing	+8.7	

=== Cottesloe ===
2021 Western Australian state election: Cottesloe
Party	Candidate	Votes	%	±%
Liberal	David Honey	12,624	46.8	−10.7
Labor	Gemma West	7,637	28.3	+6.2
Greens	Theresa Moss	3,410	12.7	+0.8
Independent	Tony Parker	2,670	9.9	+9.9
No Mandatory Vaccination	R. Drayton	329	1.2	+1.2
WAxit	Paul Batsioudis	276	1.0	+0.2
Total formal votes		26,946	97.4	+0.8
Informal votes		715	2.6	−0.8
Turnout		27,661	88.6	+0.2
Two-party-preferred result
Liberal	David Honey	15,470	57.4	−6.6
Labor	Gemma West	11,470	42.6	+6.6
Liberal hold		Swing	−6.6	

=== Darling Range ===
2021 Western Australian state election: Darling Range
Party	Candidate	Votes	%	±%
Labor	Hugh Jones	14,854	56.0	+14.2
Liberal	Alyssa Hayden	7,494	28.3	−1.7
Greens	Matthew Lacey	1,254	4.7	−2.9
Christians	Eric Eikelboom	1,230	4.6	0.0
One Nation	Anthony Fenech	524	2.0	−6.8
No Mandatory Vaccination	Judith Congrene	406	1.5	+1.5
Liberal Democrats	Matthew Thompson	335	1.3	+1.3
Western Australia	Brett Clarke	187	0.7	+0.7
Independent	Dean Strautins	157	0.6	+0.6
WAxit	Alan Svilicic	65	0.2	−1.0
Total formal votes		26,506	96.4	+1.3
Informal votes		981	3.6	−1.3
Turnout		27,487	88.2	+1.0
Two-party-preferred result
Labor	Hugh Jones	16,822	63.5	+7.5
Liberal	Alyssa Hayden	9,668	36.5	−7.5
Labor hold		Swing	+7.5	

=== Dawesville ===
2021 Western Australian state election: Dawesville
Party	Candidate	Votes	%	±%
Labor	Lisa Munday	15,024	57.7	+24.4
Liberal	Zak Kirkup	8,400	32.3	−4.6
Greens	Stewart Godden	820	3.2	−1.2
One Nation	Kerry Gilmour	398	1.5	−7.8
Legalise Cannabis	Mark Charles	363	1.4	+1.4
Shooters, Fishers, Farmers	Peter Stacey	337	1.3	−1.3
No Mandatory Vaccination	Elijah Stonehouse	238	0.9	+0.9
National	Patricia Leake	178	0.7	−1.5
Sustainable Australia	Karen Oborn	125	0.5	+0.5
WAxit	Melissa Oancea	74	0.3	−0.4
Liberal Democrats	Bradley Chalke	62	0.2	+0.2
Total formal votes		26,019	96.2	+1.1
Informal votes		1,017	3.8	−1.1
Turnout		27,036	86.4	+3.1
Two-party-preferred result
Labor	Lisa Munday	16,633	63.9	+14.7
Liberal	Zak Kirkup	9,378	36.1	−14.7
Labor gain from Liberal		Swing	+14.7	

=== Forrestfield ===
2021 Western Australian state election: Forrestfield
Party	Candidate	Votes	%	±%
Labor	Stephen Price	15,770	68.6	+22.3
Liberal	George Tilbury	4,438	19.3	−10.7
Greens	Beth McMullan	1,008	4.4	−2.1
Christians	Peter Lampard	604	2.6	−0.2
One Nation	Roger Barnett	518	2.3	−7.8
No Mandatory Vaccination	Cameron Peters	339	1.5	+1.5
Western Australia	Owen Doye	207	0.9	+0.9
WAxit	Mohammod Shahalam	99	0.4	−0.6
Total formal votes		22,983	96.1	+1.3
Informal votes		927	3.9	−1.3
Turnout		23,910	85.4	−1.5
Two-party-preferred result
Labor	Stephen Price	17,349	75.5	+16.1
Liberal	George Tilbury	5,629	24.5	−16.1
Labor hold		Swing	+16.1	

=== Fremantle ===
2021 Western Australian state election: Fremantle
Party	Candidate	Votes	%	±%
Labor	Simone McGurk	14,646	57.3	+6.0
Greens	Liberty Cramer	4,769	18.6	+0.0
Liberal	Miquela Riley	3,837	15.0	−5.5
Socialist Alliance	Sam Wainwright	726	2.8	+0.8
No Mandatory Vaccination	W. Schulze	577	2.3	+2.3
Liberal Democrats	Carl Schelling	492	1.9	+1.9
Independent	Rod Grljusich	318	1.2	+1.2
Western Australia	Janetia Knapp	216	0.8	+0.2
Total formal votes		25,581	96.6	+1.2
Informal votes		900	3.4	−1.2
Turnout		26,481	84.5	+1.5
Notional two-party-preferred count
Labor	Simone McGurk	19,957	78.1	+5.1
Liberal	Miquela Riley	5,596	21.9	−5.1
Two-candidate-preferred result
Labor	Simone McGurk	16,800	65.7	−7.3
Greens	Liberty Cramer	8,753	34.3	+34.3
Labor hold				

=== Geraldton ===
2021 Western Australian state election: Geraldton
Party	Candidate	Votes	%	±%
Labor	Lara Dalton	11,676	54.7	+21.0
National	Ian Blayney	5,222	24.5	+7.0
Liberal	Rob Dines	2,750	12.9	−14.8
Greens	Matt Roberts	536	2.5	−1.5
Shooters, Fishers, Farmers	Chris Mellon	380	1.8	−2.0
One Nation	Bruce Davies	336	1.6	−7.9
No Mandatory Vaccination	Mark Long	248	1.2	+1.2
WAxit	Bey Bey Kung	127	0.6	+0.6
Liberal Democrats	Andrew Genovese	77	0.4	+0.4
Total formal votes		21,352	96.6	+0.9
Informal votes		746	3.4	−0.9
Turnout		22,098	82.6	−2.1
Two-candidate-preferred result
Labor	Lara Dalton	13,170	61.7	+13.0
National	Ian Blayney	8,173	38.3	−13.0
Labor gain from National		Swing	+13.0	

=== Hillarys ===
2021 Western Australian state election: Hillarys
Party	Candidate	Votes	%	±%
Labor	Caitlin Collins	15,671	61.4	+28.1
Liberal	Peter Katsambanis	6,900	27.0	−11.0
Greens	Greg Glazov	1,366	5.4	−3.9
Legalise Cannabis	Katrina Winfield	582	2.3	+2.3
No Mandatory Vaccination	W. Seeto	476	1.9	+1.9
Liberals for Climate	Rick Tylka	339	1.3	+1.3
WAxit	Zoran Jankulovski	184	0.7	+0.5
Total formal votes		25,518	97.0	+0.9
Informal votes		802	3.0	−0.9
Turnout		26,320	88.1	−0.3
Two-party-preferred result
Labor	Caitlin Collins	17,597	69.0	+19.3
Liberal	Peter Katsambanis	7,919	31.0	−19.3
Labor gain from Liberal		Swing	+19.3	

=== Jandakot ===
2021 Western Australian state election: Jandakot
Party	Candidate	Votes	%	±%
Labor	Yaz Mubarakai	17,950	64.5	+24.1
Liberal	Mihael McCoy	6,460	23.2	−15.2
Greens	Heather Lonsdale	1,347	4.8	−1.9
Christians	Marianne Pretorius	921	3.3	−0.3
One Nation	Dominic Kelly	388	1.4	−5.4
Liberal Democrats	Damon Miles	265	1.0	+1.0
No Mandatory Vaccination	P. Hallifax	262	0.9	+0.9
WAxit	Jagdip Singh	251	0.9	−0.9
Total formal votes		27,844	96.8	+0.7
Informal votes		914	3.2	−0.7
Turnout		28,758	89.5	+5.8
Two-party-preferred result
Labor	Yaz Mubarakai	19,773	71.0	+19.2
Liberal	Mihael McCoy	8,067	29.0	−19.2
Labor hold		Swing	+19.2	

=== Joondalup ===
2021 Western Australian state election: Joondalup
Party	Candidate	Votes	%	±%
Labor	Emily Hamilton	15,892	65.4	+25.2
Liberal	Sheldon Ingham	4,756	19.6	−24.2
Greens	Angelo Watts	1,102	4.5	−4.0
Christians	Shanthi Hildebrandt	537	2.2	+0.5
Independent	Ziggi Murphy	484	2.0	+2.0
Legalise Cannabis	Bret Treasure	465	1.9	+1.9
No Mandatory Vaccination	Howard Davey	334	1.4	+1.4
Liberal Democrats	Peter McLoughlin	286	1.2	+1.2
WAxit	Jules Rikkers	240	1.0	+0.2
Western Australia	Peter Westcott	203	0.8	−0.3
Total formal votes		24,299	96.2	+0.8
Informal votes		948	3.8	−0.8
Turnout		25,247	87.3	+1.5
Two-party-preferred result
Labor	Emily Hamilton	18,150	74.7	+24.7
Liberal	Sheldon Ingham	6,137	25.3	−24.7
Labor hold		Swing	+24.7	

=== Kalamunda ===
2021 Western Australian state election: Kalamunda
Party	Candidate	Votes	%	±%
Labor	Matthew Hughes	13,100	51.3	+14.3
Liberal	Liam Staltari	8,124	31.8	−5.9
Greens	Lee-Anne Miles	2,164	8.5	−4.3
Christians	Brady Williams	651	2.5	−0.2
No Mandatory Vaccination	Michael Fane	415	1.6	+1.6
Liberal Democrats	Carolyn Trigwell	382	1.5	+1.4
One Nation	Maureen Butters	372	1.5	−5.8
Western Australia	Stephen Phelan	267	1.0	−0.2
WAxit	Robert Ellis	74	0.3	−0.7
Total formal votes		25,549	96.8	+0.7
Informal votes		836	3.2	−0.7
Turnout		26,385	89.3	−0.1
Two-party-preferred result
Labor	Matthew Hughes	15,781	61.8	+9.5
Liberal	Liam Staltari	9,763	38.2	−9.5
Labor hold		Swing	+9.5	

=== Kalgoorlie ===
2021 Western Australian state election: Kalgoorlie
Party	Candidate	Votes	%	±%
Labor	Ali Kent	7,782	52.7	+26.6
Liberal	Kyran O'Donnell	3,695	25.0	−3.0
National	Rowena Olsen	1,608	10.9	−13.5
One Nation	Patrick Redreau	494	3.3	−8.8
Shooters, Fishers, Farmers	Jack Carmody	465	3.2	−0.9
Greens	Alex Wallace	328	2.2	−2.0
Liberal Democrats	Sam Rennie	217	1.5	+1.5
No Mandatory Vaccination	Enrico Piazza	140	0.9	+0.9
WAxit	Rustu Buyukcakar	31	0.2	+0.2
Total formal votes		14,760	96.2	+0.2
Informal votes		591	3.8	−0.2
Turnout		15,351	78.1	−2.6
Two-party-preferred result
Labor	Ali Kent	9,152	62.0	+18.2
Liberal	Kyran O'Donnell	5,601	38.0	−18.2
Labor gain from Liberal		Swing	+18.2	

=== Kimberley ===
2021 Western Australian state election: Kimberley
Party	Candidate	Votes	%	±%
Labor	Divina D'Anna	5,747	53.9	+9.0
Liberal	Geoff Haerewa	2,187	20.5	+3.2
Greens	Naomi Pigram	1,601	15.0	+5.8
National	Millie Hills	658	6.2	−10.1
One Nation	Roger Modolo	221	2.1	−6.0
Independent	Kai Jones	98	0.9	−1.0
No Mandatory Vaccination	A. Herman	85	0.8	+0.8
Western Australia	Karl Fehlauer	68	0.6	+0.6
Total formal votes		10,665	96.3	+0.4
Informal votes		410	3.7	−0.4
Turnout		11,075	70.4	−9.2
Two-party-preferred result
Labor	Divina D'Anna	7,618	71.5	+8.3
Liberal	Geoff Haerewa	3,044	28.5	−8.3
Labor hold		Swing	+8.3	

=== Kingsley ===
2021 Western Australian state election: Kingsley
Party	Candidate	Votes	%	±%
Labor	Jessica Stojkovski	15,883	60.5	+19.6
Liberal	Scott Edwardes	7,925	30.2	−12.4
Greens	Isabella Tripp	1,461	5.6	−4.4
One Nation	Concetta Webber	436	1.7	+1.7
No Mandatory Vaccination	Lynda Crawford	373	1.4	+1.4
WAxit	Dianne McGarry	164	0.6	−0.9
Total formal votes		26,242	96.8	+0.9
Informal votes		871	3.2	−0.9
Turnout		27,113	90.2	−1.5
Two-party-preferred result
Labor	Jessica Stojkovski	17,548	66.9	+15.7
Liberal	Scott Edwardes	8,687	33.1	−15.7
Labor hold		Swing	+15.7	

=== Kwinana ===
2021 Western Australian state election: Kwinana
Party	Candidate	Votes	%	±%
Labor	Roger Cook	17,936	76.9	+19.8
Liberal	Bianca Talbot	2,533	10.9	−8.5
Greens	Lauren Rickert	1,189	5.1	−2.7
One Nation	Steven Summerell	699	3.0	−6.2
No Mandatory Vaccination	Connie Portelli	405	1.7	+1.7
WAxit	Christopher Burnet	208	0.9	−0.6
Liberal Democrats	Christopher Vellnagel	175	0.8	+0.7
Western Australia	Venkat Devarapalli	165	0.7	+0.7
Total formal votes		23,310	96.1	+1.0
Informal votes		949	3.9	−1.0
Turnout		24,259	83.7	+2.6
Two-party-preferred result
Labor	Roger Cook	19,754	84.8	+14.0
Liberal	Bianca Talbot	3,550	15.2	−14.0
Labor hold		Swing	+14.0	

=== Landsdale ===
2021 Western Australian state election: Landsdale
Party	Candidate	Votes	%	±%
Labor	Margaret Quirk	18,217	69.3	+19.4
Liberal	Brett Raponi	5,293	20.1	−11.9
Greens	Katrina House	1,090	4.1	−2.1
Western Australia	Shailee Desai	878	3.3	+3.1
No Mandatory Vaccination	Leah Beedham	579	2.2	+2.2
WAxit	Sareeta Doobree	236	0.9	−0.7
Total formal votes		26,293	95.7	+0.8
Informal votes		1,183	4.3	−0.8
Turnout		27,476	88.5	+2.9
Two-party-preferred result
Labor	Margaret Quirk	19,820	75.4	+15.8
Liberal	Brett Raponi	6,471	24.6	−15.8
Labor hold		Swing	+15.8	

=== Mandurah ===
2021 Western Australian state election: Mandurah
Party	Candidate	Votes	%	±%
Labor	David Templeman	16,776	68.7	+12.0
Liberal	Ryan Burns	4,875	20.0	−1.7
Greens	Xanthe Turner	726	3.0	−1.8
Shooters, Fishers, Farmers	Ian Blevin	531	2.2	+2.1
Legalise Cannabis	Rodney Beaton	412	1.7	+1.7
One Nation	Haydn Regterschot	388	1.6	−11.2
No Mandatory Vaccination	Samy Spinola	214	0.9	+0.9
Independent	Gavin Farbey	177	0.7	+0.7
National	Cons Ortheil	144	0.6	−1.4
Sustainable Australia	Katherine Summers	117	0.5	+0.5
WAxit	Marius Timis	60	0.2	−0.4
Total formal votes		24,420	94.6	−0.2
Informal votes		1,386	5.4	+0.2
Turnout		25,806	82.1	−2.1
Two-party-preferred result
Labor	David Templeman	18,368	75.2	+7.3
Liberal	Ryan Burns	6,049	24.8	−7.3
Labor hold		Swing	+7.3	

=== Maylands ===
2021 Western Australian state election: Maylands
Party	Candidate	Votes	%	±%
Labor	Lisa Baker	15,303	62.0	+12.2
Greens	Emma Pringle	3,985	16.1	−1.0
Liberal	Justin Iemma	3,848	15.6	−11.8
No Mandatory Vaccination	Carmel Addink	528	2.1	+2.1
Christians	Gaye Burnett	449	1.8	−0.2
One Nation	Maria Andreeva	339	1.4	+1.4
WAxit	Peter Baker	226	0.9	−0.5
Total formal votes		24,678	96.4	+1.3
Informal votes		918	3.6	−1.3
Turnout		25,596	86.1	+0.2
Two-party-preferred result
Labor	Lisa Baker	19,566	79.3	+11.5
Liberal	Justin Iemma	5,103	20.7	−11.5
Labor hold		Swing	+11.5	

=== Midland ===
2021 Western Australian state election: Midland
Party	Candidate	Votes	%	±%
Labor	Michelle Roberts	16,684	65.8	+16.6
Liberal	Jo Cicchini	4,892	19.3	−9.9
Greens	Brendan Sturcke	1,697	6.7	−2.2
Christians	Ester Nabate	685	2.7	+2.7
One Nation	Teresa Olow	545	2.1	−5.8
No Mandatory Vaccination	Steve Kelly	399	1.6	+1.6
Western Australia	Brad Bedford	360	1.4	+0.5
WAxit	Mohit Bhasin	104	0.4	−0.6
Total formal votes		25,366	95.6	+0.3
Informal votes		1,169	4.4	−0.3
Turnout		26,535	83.9	+0.3
Two-party-preferred result
Labor	Michelle Roberts	19,131	75.5	+12.6
Liberal	Jo Cicchini	6,221	24.5	−12.6
Labor hold		Swing	+12.6	

=== Mirrabooka ===
2021 Western Australian state election: Mirrabooka
Party	Candidate	Votes	%	±%
Labor	Meredith Hammat	16,173	71.6	+8.9
Liberal	Aaron Sawmadal	2,276	10.1	−11.2
Greens	Mark Cooper	1,333	5.9	−0.5
One Nation	Michael Mabood	939	4.2	+4.2
Christians	Dwight Randall	790	3.5	+0.1
No Mandatory Vaccination	Jessica Ayre	477	2.1	+2.1
Independent	Peter Dunne	257	1.1	+1.1
Independent	Kim Mubarak	200	0.9	−0.5
WAxit	Devinder Chhina	140	0.6	−0.8
Total formal votes		22,585	92.8	+0.7
Informal votes		1,760	7.2	−0.7
Turnout		24,345	81.3	−3.4
Two-party-preferred result
Labor	Meredith Hammat	18,878	83.7	+10.4
Liberal	Aaron Sawmadal	3,676	16.3	−10.4
Labor hold		Swing	+10.4	

=== Moore ===
2021 Western Australian state election: Moore
Party	Candidate	Votes	%	±%
National	Shane Love	8,353	38.0	+1.1
Labor	Barni Norton	7,432	33.8	+13.9
Liberal	Darren Slyns	3,701	16.8	−2.0
Shooters, Fishers, Farmers	Ross Williamson	984	4.5	−1.3
Greens	Brian Spittles	638	2.9	−1.0
One Nation	Ian Frizzell	579	2.6	−10.1
No Mandatory Vaccination	T. Asmutaitis	233	1.1	+1.1
WAxit	Richard Banka	86	0.4	+0.4
Total formal votes		22,006	96.3	+0.3
Informal votes		855	3.7	−0.3
Turnout		22,861	87.9	−3.6
Two-candidate-preferred result
National	Shane Love	12,870	58.5	−6.3
Labor	Barni Norton	9,132	41.5	+41.5
National hold				

=== Morley ===
2021 Western Australian state election: Morley
Party	Candidate	Votes	%	±%
Labor	Amber-Jade Sanderson	17,447	70.4	+18.0
Liberal	Jim Seth	3,931	15.9	−15.7
Greens	Thomas Marcinkowski	1,525	6.2	−3.2
Christians	Alan Wells	815	3.3	+0.5
One Nation	Julian Scully	452	1.8	+1.8
No Mandatory Vaccination	Rhonda Kerslake	396	1.6	+1.6
WAxit	Aman Singh	217	0.9	−0.8
Total formal votes		24,783	95.5	+1.4
Informal votes		1,176	4.5	−1.4
Turnout		25,959	86.2	−1.2
Two-party-preferred result
Labor	Amber-Jade Sanderson	19,458	78.6	+16.2
Liberal	Jim Seth	5,311	21.4	−16.2
Labor hold		Swing	+16.2	

=== Mount Lawley ===
2021 Western Australian state election: Mount Lawley
Party	Candidate	Votes	%	±%
Labor	Simon Millman	14,653	59.0	+18.2
Liberal	Suzanne Migdale	5,807	23.4	−17.3
Greens	Lucy Nicol	2,768	11.1	−1.3
No Mandatory Vaccination	John Watt	549	2.2	+2.2
Christians	Ellen Joubert	425	1.7	−0.8
Western Australia	Russell Goodrick	321	1.3	+1.3
One Nation	Herbie Schaal	203	0.8	+0.8
WAxit	Gurjant Sangha	108	0.4	−1.1
Total formal votes		24,834	96.6	+1.0
Informal votes		887	3.4	−1.0
Turnout		25,721	86.6	−1.3
Two-party-preferred result
Labor	Simon Millman	17,768	71.6	+17.5
Liberal	Suzanne Migdale	7,063	28.4	−17.5
Labor hold		Swing	+17.5	

=== Murray-Wellington ===
2021 Western Australian state election: Murray-Wellington
Party	Candidate	Votes	%	±%
Labor	Robyn Clarke	14,486	57.9	+21.2
Liberal	Michelle Boylan	6,099	24.4	−5.1
Shooters, Fishers, Farmers	Mark McCall	1,149	4.6	−1.5
National	Leonie Lemmey	728	2.9	−7.6
Legalise Cannabis	Shaun Carney	726	2.9	+2.9
Greens	Vince Puccio	706	2.8	−1.5
One Nation	Bernie Wansbrough	513	2.0	−9.3
No Mandatory Vaccination	Aimee Herriot	281	1.1	+1.1
Sustainable Australia	Andrew Brown	164	0.7	+0.7
Liberal Democrats	Jayden Staszewski	110	0.4	+0.4
WAxit	Dinko Golem	66	0.3	+0.3
Total formal votes		25,028	95.2	+0.3
Informal votes		1,269	4.8	−0.3
Turnout		26,297	86.5	−1.5
Two-party-preferred result
Labor	Robyn Clarke	16,816	67.2	+15.5
Liberal	Michelle Boylan	8,193	32.8	−15.5
Labor hold		Swing	+15.5	

=== Nedlands ===
2021 Western Australian state election: Nedlands
Party	Candidate	Votes	%	±%
Labor	Katrina Stratton	9,327	35.7	+9.1
Liberal	Bill Marmion	9,160	35.0	−16.6
Greens	Tamara Alderdice	3,549	13.6	−1.9
Independent	Fiona Argyle	2,883	11.0	+11.0
Independent	Andrew Mangano	632	2.4	+2.4
No Mandatory Vaccination	Vivien Forrest	412	1.6	+1.6
WAxit	Dennis Jennings	179	0.7	−0.7
Total formal votes		26,142	97.6	+0.8
Informal votes		648	2.4	−0.8
Turnout		26,790	88.4	+1.2
Two-party-preferred result
Labor	Katrina Stratton	13,805	52.8	+10.8
Liberal	Bill Marmion	12,330	47.2	−10.8
Labor gain from Liberal		Swing	+10.8	

=== North West Central ===
2021 Western Australian state election: North West Central
Party	Candidate	Votes	%	±%
Labor	Cherie Sibosado	3,114	40.2	+13.5
National	Vince Catania	3,075	39.7	+3.6
Liberal	Alys McKeough	611	7.9	−7.9
Greens	Sandy Burt	318	4.1	−1.5
Shooters, Fishers, Farmers	Stefan Colagiuri	233	3.0	+2.6
One Nation	Robert Tonkin	232	3.0	−8.4
No Mandatory Vaccination	A. Agyputri	81	1.0	+1.0
Independent	Henry Seddon	40	0.5	+0.5
WAxit	Brendan McKay	37	0.5	+0.2
Total formal votes		7,741	95.5	+0.1
Informal votes		367	4.5	−0.1
Turnout		8,108	73.8	−5.5
Two-candidate-preferred result
National	Vince Catania	3,997	51.7	−8.4
Labor	Cherie Sibosado	3,738	48.3	+8.4
National hold		Swing	−8.4	

=== Perth ===
2021 Western Australian state election: Perth
Party	Candidate	Votes	%	±%
Labor	John Carey	16,594	63.5	+16.3
Liberal	Kylee Veskovich	4,666	17.9	−15.2
Greens	Francesca Pandolfino	4,177	16.0	+1.5
No Mandatory Vaccination	Scott Beard	476	1.8	+1.8
WAxit	Angelo Minniti	225	0.9	0.0
Total formal votes		26,138	96.8	+0.5
Informal votes		858	3.2	−0.5
Turnout		26,996	84.1	+2.7
Two-party-preferred result
Labor	John Carey	20,719	79.3	+16.6
Liberal	Kylee Veskovich	5,418	20.7	−16.6
Labor hold		Swing	+16.6	

=== Pilbara ===
2021 Western Australian state election: Pilbara
Party	Candidate	Votes	%	±%
Labor	Kevin Michel	9,075	61.0	+30.1
National	Scott Bourne	2,715	18.3	−9.1
Liberal	Camilo Blanco	1,241	8.3	−6.9
Greens	Machelle Vaughan-Cartner	504	3.4	−0.7
Shooters, Fishers, Farmers	David Allison-Forrest	453	3.0	−6.5
One Nation	Sandi Crouch	432	2.9	−8.5
No Mandatory Vaccination	Max Elliott	270	1.8	+1.8
Western Australia	Don Hyland	115	0.8	+0.8
WAxit	Navneet Jawanda	68	0.5	0.0
Total formal votes		14,873	95.2	−0.2
Informal votes		748	4.8	+0.2
Turnout		15,621	67.1	−0.8
Two-candidate-preferred result
Labor	Kevin Michel	10,459	70.4	+18.1
National	Scott Bourne	4,408	29.6	−18.1
Labor hold				

=== Riverton ===
2021 Western Australian state election: Riverton
Party	Candidate	Votes	%	±%
Labor	Jags Krishnan	12,850	50.0	+16.1
Liberal	Anthony Spagnolo	8,928	34.7	−10.2
Greens	Simon Blackburn	1,989	7.7	−1.6
Christians	Dena Gower	955	3.7	−0.9
Liberal Democrats	Chris Holman	444	1.7	+1.7
Western Australia	Terry Lee	293	1.1	+0.0
No Mandatory Vaccination	Penelope Scull	242	0.9	+0.9
Total formal votes		25,701	97.4	+1.2
Informal votes		675	2.6	−1.2
Turnout		26,376	90.8	−0.6
Two-party-preferred result
Labor	Jags Krishnan	15,157	59.0	+13.2
Liberal	Anthony Spagnolo	10,537	41.0	−13.2
Labor gain from Liberal		Swing	+13.2	

=== Rockingham ===
2021 Western Australian state election: Rockingham
Party	Candidate	Votes	%	±%
Labor	Mark McGowan	19,661	82.8	+21.3
Liberal	Michael McClure	2,322	9.8	−7.9
Greens	Breanna Morgan	753	3.2	−4.0
One Nation	Geoff George	489	2.1	−6.6
No Mandatory Vaccination	Tom Hawkins	383	1.6	+1.6
Liberal Democrats	William Lofts	151	0.6	+0.6
Total formal votes		23,759	96.7	+1.1
Informal votes		801	3.3	−1.1
Turnout		24,560	83.9	−1.2
Two-party-preferred result
Labor	Mark McGowan	20,836	87.7	+14.2
Liberal	Michael McClure	2,916	12.3	−14.2
Labor hold		Swing	+14.2	

=== Roe ===
2021 Western Australian state election: Roe
Party	Candidate	Votes	%	±%
National	Peter Rundle	8,506	41.6	−0.1
Labor	Bradley Willis	5,979	29.2	+14.7
Liberal	David Dwyer	3,004	14.7	−9.9
Shooters, Fishers, Farmers	Bevan Steele	982	4.8	−0.2
Greens	Nikki Starr	809	4.0	+0.5
Christians	Cathie Kelly	502	2.5	+0.1
One Nation	Graham Bushby	352	1.7	−6.3
WAxit	Gary Jammu	180	0.9	+0.9
No Mandatory Vaccination	Nita Thakrar	131	0.6	+0.6
Total formal votes		20,445	96.1	0.0
Informal votes		833	3.9	+0.0
Turnout		21,278	86.1	−5.1
Two-candidate-preferred result
National	Peter Rundle	12,483	61.1	−2.7
Labor	Bradley Willis	7,946	38.9	+38.9
National hold				

=== Scarborough ===
2021 Western Australian state election: Scarborough
Party	Candidate	Votes	%	±%
Labor	Stuart Aubrey	12,750	50.3	+20.7
Liberal	Liza Harvey	8,808	34.7	−13.0
Greens	SP Becker	2,331	9.2	−4.8
No Mandatory Vaccination	Vanya Markovina	498	2.0	+2.0
Independent	Dave Vos	337	1.3	+1.3
Western Australia	Troy Coward	300	1.2	+0.0
Liberals for Climate	Daniel Bridgewater	213	0.8	+0.8
WAxit	Johnny Boccardi	125	0.5	−0.9
Total formal votes		25,362	97.0	+1.0
Informal votes		771	3.0	−1.0
Turnout		26,133	84.4	+7.0
Two-party-preferred result
Labor	Stuart Aubrey	15,315	60.4	+16.1
Liberal	Liza Harvey	10,039	39.6	−16.1
Labor gain from Liberal		Swing	+16.1	

=== South Perth ===
2021 Western Australian state election: South Perth
Party	Candidate	Votes	%	±%
Labor	Geoff Baker	12,473	49.9	+20.3
Liberal	Ryan Chorley	8,846	35.4	−14.7
Greens	Mark Brogan	2,597	10.4	−1.4
Liberal Democrats	Jack Taylor	617	2.5	+2.5
No Mandatory Vaccination	Dwain Hill	440	1.8	+1.8
Total formal votes		24,973	97.0	+0.6
Informal votes		780	3.0	−0.6
Turnout		25,753	86.7	+0.6
Two-party-preferred result
Labor	Geoff Baker	15,007	60.1	+17.3
Liberal	Ryan Chorley	9,962	39.9	−17.3
Labor gain from Liberal		Swing	+17.3	

=== Southern River ===
2021 Western Australian state election: Southern River
Party	Candidate	Votes	%	±%
Labor	Terry Healy	18,718	76.0	+26.3
Liberal	Ruben Zandman	2,879	11.7	−27.2
Greens	Simone Collins	875	3.6	−2.8
Christians	Gerard Spoelstra	799	3.2	+3.2
One Nation	Malcolm Heffernan	334	1.4	+1.4
No Mandatory Vaccination	Katie Hawkes	307	1.2	+1.2
WAxit	Shazi Siddiqui	283	1.1	+0.2
Liberal Democrats	Wesley Du Preez	257	1.0	+0.4
Independent	Julia Walsh	188	0.8	+0.8
Total formal votes		24,640	96.0	+0.7
Informal votes		1,039	4.0	−0.7
Turnout		25,679	86.6	+1.0
Two-party-preferred result
Labor	Terry Healy	20,472	83.1	+25.3
Liberal	Ruben Zandman	4,155	16.9	−25.3
Labor hold		Swing	+25.3	

=== Swan Hills ===
2021 Western Australian state election: Swan Hills
Party	Candidate	Votes	%	±%
Labor	Jessica Shaw	17,255	69.8	+20.4
Liberal	Rod Henderson	4,571	18.5	−9.6
Greens	Melanye Wawrik	1,189	4.8	−2.7
No Mandatory Vaccination	Timothy Bunton	782	3.2	+3.2
Christians	Magdeleen Strauss	675	2.7	+2.5
WAxit	Asif Ali	256	1.0	−0.6
Total formal votes		24,728	95.2	−0.5
Informal votes		1,245	4.8	+0.5
Turnout		25,973	85.8	+8.1
Two-party-preferred result
Labor	Jessica Shaw	19,069	77.1	+15.0
Liberal	Rod Henderson	5,655	22.9	−15.0
Labor hold		Swing	+15.0	

=== Thornlie ===
2021 Western Australian state election: Thornlie
Party	Candidate	Votes	%	±%
Labor	Chris Tallentire	17,501	74.2	+21.5
Liberal	Kevin McDonald	3,273	13.9	−11.1
Greens	Rachel Wright	1,159	4.9	−2.0
Christians	Madeleine Goiran	1,002	4.2	+0.7
No Mandatory Vaccination	Rachael Hall	488	2.1	+2.1
WAxit	J. S. Masih	177	0.8	−0.6
Total formal votes		23,600	95.8	+1.8
Informal votes		1,035	4.2	−1.8
Turnout		24,635	83.0	−2.2
Two-party-preferred result
Labor	Chris Tallentire	19,081	80.9	+15.1
Liberal	Kevin McDonald	4,508	19.1	−15.1
Labor hold		Swing	+15.1	

=== Vasse ===
2021 Western Australian state election: Vasse
Party	Candidate	Votes	%	±%
Liberal	Libby Mettam	11,697	44.1	−2.1
Labor	Chris Hossen	8,998	34.0	+13.3
Greens	Mia Krasenstein	2,765	10.4	−3.4
National	Peter Gordon	1,135	4.3	−15.0
Shooters, Fishers, Farmers	Cameron Van Veen	521	2.0	+2.0
No Mandatory Vaccination	A. W. Judd	489	1.8	+1.8
Legalise Cannabis	Neridah Rich	403	1.5	+1.5
One Nation	Jackson Wreford	253	1.0	+1.0
Sustainable Australia	Brad Satchell	191	0.7	+0.7
WAxit	Nicolas Oancea	46	0.2	+0.2
Total formal votes		26,498	96.5	+0.5
Informal votes		958	3.5	−0.5
Turnout		27,456	87.8	+2.8
Two-party-preferred result
Liberal	Libby Mettam	14,387	54.3	−10.3
Labor	Chris Hossen	12,107	45.7	+10.3
Liberal hold		Swing	−10.3	

=== Victoria Park ===
2021 Western Australian state election: Victoria Park
Party	Candidate	Votes	%	±%
Labor	Hannah Beazley	14,673	63.7	+12.6
Liberal	Amanda-Sue Markham	3,733	16.2	−12.0
Greens	Gerard Siero	2,912	12.6	−2.0
Liberal Democrats	Aaron Farrell	542	2.4	+2.4
Christians	Janine Vander Ven	522	2.3	−1.4
No Mandatory Vaccination	Sue-Ann Connolly	350	1.5	+1.5
One Nation	Darren Sandow	307	1.3	+1.3
Total formal votes		23,039	96.7	+1.1
Informal votes		782	3.3	−1.1
Turnout		23,821	83.0	+0.8
Two-party-preferred result
Labor	Hannah Beazley	17,932	77.8	+11.1
Liberal	Amanda-Sue Markham	5,105	22.2	−11.1
Labor hold		Swing	+11.1	

=== Wanneroo ===
2021 Western Australian state election: Wanneroo
Party	Candidate	Votes	%	±%
Labor	Sabine Winton	18,366	71.8	+24.4
Liberal	Paul Miles	4,686	18.3	−11.3
Greens	Matthew Ward	1,150	4.5	−3.2
No Mandatory Vaccination	J. Bullock	637	2.5	+2.5
Western Australia	Lilian Siviour	404	1.6	+0.5
WAxit	Sandy Culum-Buzak	335	1.3	+0.8
Total formal votes		25,578	95.7	+0.2
Informal votes		1,152	4.3	−0.2
Turnout		26,730	85.4	+5.2
Two-party-preferred result
Labor	Sabine Winton	20,059	78.4	+19.8
Liberal	Paul Miles	5,516	21.6	−19.8
Labor hold		Swing	+19.8	

=== Warnbro ===
2021 Western Australian state election: Warnbro
Party	Candidate	Votes	%	±%
Labor	Paul Papalia	19,300	76.9	+16.2
Liberal	Mark Jones	3,324	13.2	−2.7
Greens	Robert Delves	1,016	4.0	−2.9
One Nation	Liam Hall	616	2.5	−9.5
No Mandatory Vaccination	Brandon Suchalla-Young	463	1.8	+1.8
WAxit	Bob Velev	218	0.9	−0.1
Liberal Democrats	Cameron McMaster	171	0.7	+0.7
Total formal votes		25,108	96.4	+0.7
Informal votes		930	3.6	−0.7
Turnout		26,038	84.3	+3.1
Two-party-preferred result
Labor	Paul Papalia	20,945	83.4	+9.7
Liberal	Mark Jones	4,157	16.6	−9.7
Labor hold		Swing	+9.7	

=== Warren-Blackwood ===
2021 Western Australian state election: Warren-Blackwood
Party	Candidate	Votes	%	±%
National	Terry Redman	8,219	32.6	−3.6
Labor	Jane Kelsbie	8,197	32.6	+11.7
Greens	Jeff Pow	3,362	13.4	−1.2
Liberal	Marie O'Dea	2,513	10.0	−5.8
Shooters, Fishers, Farmers	Paul Da Silva	1,048	4.2	−1.5
Legalise Cannabis	Nick Lethbridge	588	2.3	+2.3
No Mandatory Vaccination	Helen Allan	526	2.1	+2.1
One Nation	Steven Regterschot	419	1.7	−5.3
Sustainable Australia	Peter Strachan	309	1.2	+1.2
Total formal votes		25,181	96.2	+0.5
Informal votes		994	3.8	−0.5
Turnout		26,175	87.6	−0.8
Two-candidate-preferred result
Labor	Jane Kelsbie	12,903	51.3	+14.1
National	Terry Redman	12,266	48.7	−14.1
Labor gain from National		Swing	+14.1	

=== West Swan ===
2021 Western Australian state election: West Swan
Party	Candidate	Votes	%	±%
Labor	Rita Saffioti	20,635	77.9	+19.2
Liberal	Dave Nesbit	3,122	11.8	−13.7
Greens	Manjot Singh	1,038	3.9	−2.3
Christians	Brian Warburton	823	3.1	+1.3
No Mandatory Vaccination	Genevieve Cocliff	438	1.7	+1.7
WAxit	Lucky Saini	421	1.6	+0.7
Total formal votes		26,477	95.7	+1.0
Informal votes		1,204	4.3	−1.0
Turnout		27,681	85.8	−3.8
Two-party-preferred result
Labor	Rita Saffioti	22,278	84.2	+15.7
Liberal	Dave Nesbit	4,194	15.8	−15.7
Labor hold		Swing	+15.7	

=== Willagee ===
2021 Western Australian state election: Willagee
Party	Candidate	Votes	%	±%
Labor	Peter Tinley	15,576	66.1	+11.3
Liberal	Barry Jones	4,525	19.2	−9.3
Greens	Felicity Townsend	2,197	9.3	−1.9
No Mandatory Vaccination	Susan Poole	507	2.2	+2.2
One Nation	Mark Dalrymple	434	1.8	+1.8
Liberal Democrats	Michael Mitchell	310	1.3	+1.3
Total formal votes		23,549	96.3	+1.1
Informal votes		906	3.7	−1.1
Turnout		24,455	86.1	−2.8
Two-party-preferred result
Labor	Peter Tinley	18,156	77.1	+9.5
Liberal	Barry Jones	5,387	22.9	−9.5
Labor hold		Swing	+9.5	
