= Electoral results for the district of Carine =

Western Australian district election results

This is a list of electoral results for the electoral district of Carine in Western Australian state elections.

== Members for Carine ==
| Member | Party | Term |
|---|---|---|
| Katie Hodson-Thomas | Liberal | 1996–2008 |
| Tony Krsticevic | Liberal | 2008–2021 |
| Paul Lilburne | Labor | 2021–2025 |
| Liam Staltari | Liberal | 2025–present |

== Election results ==
=== Elections in the 2020s ===
2025 Western Australian state election: Carine
| Party | Candidate | Votes | % | ±% |
|---|---|---|---|---|
| Liberal | Liam Staltari | 15,027 | 52.1 | +9.1 |
| Labor | Paul Lilburne | 9,096 | 31.5 | −14.5 |
| Greens | Lisa Hindmarsh | 3,805 | 13.2 | +5.0 |
| Christians | Sallyann Bone | 927 | 3.2 | +3.2 |
| Total formal votes | | 28,855 | 97.0 | −0.1 |
| Informal votes | | 892 | 3.0 | +0.1 |
| Turnout | | 29,747 | 91.2 | +1.6 |
Two-party-preferred result
| Liberal | Liam Staltari | 16,608 | 57.6 | +11.4 |
| Labor | Paul Lilburne | 12,244 | 42.4 | −11.4 |
| Liberal gain from Labor | | Swing | +11.4 | |

2021 Western Australian state election: Carine
| Party | Candidate | Votes | % | ±% |
|---|---|---|---|---|
| Liberal | Tony Krsticevic | 12,012 | 44.4 | −5.8 |
| Labor | Paul Lilburne | 11,993 | 44.3 | +17.1 |
| Greens | Nicholas D'Alonzo | 2,369 | 8.8 | −1.7 |
| No Mandatory Vaccination | A. Cox | 490 | 1.8 | +1.8 |
| WAxit | Marilyn Tringas | 197 | 0.7 | −0.7 |
| Total formal votes | | 27,061 | 97.2 | +0.8 |
| Informal votes | | 793 | 2.8 | −0.8 |
| Turnout | | 27,854 | 90.7 | −3.1 |
Two-party-preferred result
| Labor | Paul Lilburne | 14,195 | 52.5 | +12.7 |
| Liberal | Tony Krsticevic | 12,864 | 47.5 | −12.7 |
| Labor gain from Liberal | | Swing | +12.7 | |

=== Elections in the 2010s ===
2017 Western Australian state election: Carine
| Party | Candidate | Votes | % | ±% |
|---|---|---|---|---|
| Liberal | Tony Krsticevic | 12,083 | 50.1 | −13.4 |
| Labor | Andrew Owens | 6,851 | 28.4 | +4.0 |
| Greens | Nadine Reeves-Hennessey | 2,728 | 11.3 | +1.9 |
| One Nation | Terry Popham | 1,231 | 5.1 | +5.1 |
| Christians | Ray Moran | 505 | 2.1 | −0.5 |
| Micro Business | Athan Tsirigotis | 424 | 1.8 | +1.8 |
| Matheson for WA | Annette Almond | 289 | 1.2 | +1.2 |
| Total formal votes | | 24,111 | 96.5 | +0.9 |
| Informal votes | | 885 | 3.5 | −0.9 |
| Turnout | | 24,996 | 90.8 | −0.9 |
Two-party-preferred result
| Liberal | Tony Krsticevic | 14,233 | 59.0 | −9.3 |
| Labor | Andrew Owens | 9,871 | 41.0 | +9.3 |
| Liberal hold | | Swing | −9.3 | |

2013 Western Australian state election: Carine
| Party | Candidate | Votes | % | ±% |
|---|---|---|---|---|
| Liberal | Tony Krsticevic | 13,582 | 63.3 | +18.2 |
| Labor | Sharon Webb | 5,278 | 24.6 | +0.6 |
| Greens | Nathalie Cattaneo | 2,024 | 9.4 | –2.9 |
| Christians | Rick Davey | 581 | 2.7 | +0.4 |
| Total formal votes | | 21,465 | 95.7 | +0.1 |
| Informal votes | | 959 | 4.3 | −0.1 |
| Turnout | | 22,424 | 91.7 | |
Two-party-preferred result
| Liberal | Tony Krsticevic | 14,625 | 68.1 | +5.5 |
| Labor | Sharon Webb | 6,839 | 31.9 | –5.5 |
| Liberal hold | | Swing | +5.5 | |

=== Elections in the 2000s ===
2008 Western Australian state election: Carine
| Party | Candidate | Votes | % | ±% |
|---|---|---|---|---|
| Liberal | Tony Krsticevic | 8,733 | 43.83 | −7.6 |
| Labor | James Benson-Lidholm | 4,383 | 22.00 | −11.3 |
| Independent | Bill Stewart | 3,572 | 17.93 | +17.93 |
| Greens | Ross Copeland | 2,246 | 11.27 | +1.0 |
| Christian Democrats | Henri Chew | 380 | 1.91 | −2.1 |
| Independent | Wayne Thompson | 316 | 1.59 | +1.59 |
| Family First | Peter Rose | 295 | 1.48 | +1.0 |
| Total formal votes | | 19,925 | 95.72 | |
| Informal votes | | 890 | 4.28 | |
| Turnout | | 20,815 | 88.98 | |
Two-party-preferred result^{[1]}
| Liberal | Tony Krsticevic | 12,832 | 64.48 | +6.8 |
| Labor | James Benson-Lidholm | 7,070 | 35.52 | −6.8 |
| Liberal hold | | Swing | +6.8 | |

2005 Western Australian state election: Carine
| Party | Candidate | Votes | % | ±% |
|---|---|---|---|---|
| Liberal | Katie Hodson-Thomas | 11,814 | 48.3 | +7.3 |
| Labor | Damien Parry | 8,772 | 35.9 | +6.8 |
| Greens | Ross Copeland | 2,786 | 11.4 | +3.8 |
| Christian Democrats | Bruce Richards | 1,070 | 4.4 | +2.5 |
| Total formal votes | | 24,442 | 95.7 | −0.9 |
| Informal votes | | 1,103 | 4.3 | +0.9 |
| Turnout | | 25,545 | 90.9 | |
Two-party-preferred result
| Liberal | Katie Hodson-Thomas | 13,360 | 54.7 | −0.4 |
| Labor | Damien Parry | 11,070 | 45.3 | +0.4 |
| Liberal hold | | Swing | −0.4 | |

2001 Western Australian state election: Carine
| Party | Candidate | Votes | % | ±% |
|---|---|---|---|---|
| Liberal | Katie Hodson-Thomas | 9,746 | 44.3 | −2.2 |
| Labor | Vijay Kumar | 5,248 | 23.9 | +7.1 |
| Liberals for Forests | Carol Clarke | 2,810 | 12.8 | +12.8 |
| Greens | Phill Farren | 1,439 | 6.5 | +0.1 |
| One Nation | Gary Evans | 1,229 | 5.6 | +5.6 |
| Democrats | Helen van Noort | 676 | 3.1 | +3.1 |
| Christian Democrats | Ray Moran | 668 | 3.0 | +3.0 |
| Seniors Party | Eleanor Bell | 180 | 0.8 | +0.8 |
| Total formal votes | | 21,996 | 96.3 | −1.3 |
| Informal votes | | 845 | 3.7 | +1.3 |
| Turnout | | 22,841 | 92.2 | |
Two-party-preferred result
| Liberal | Katie Hodson-Thomas | 13,110 | 60.0 | +7.8 |
| Labor | Vijay Kumar | 8,746 | 40.0 | +40.0 |
| Liberal hold | | Swing | +7.8 | |

=== Elections in the 1990s ===
1996 Western Australian state election: Carine
| Party | Candidate | Votes | % | ±% |
|---|---|---|---|---|
| Liberal | Katie Hodson-Thomas | 10,124 | 46.5 | −17.9 |
| Independent | Peter Kyle | 5,069 | 23.3 | +23.3 |
| Labor | Ros Harley | 3,640 | 16.7 | −7.2 |
| Independent | John Bombak | 1,531 | 7.0 | +7.0 |
| Greens | Catherine Goh | 1,412 | 6.5 | +0.3 |
| Total formal votes | | 21,776 | 97.6 | +0.1 |
| Informal votes | | 546 | 2.4 | −0.1 |
| Turnout | | 22,322 | 92.1 | |
Two-candidate-preferred result
| Liberal | Katie Hodson-Thomas | 11,360 | 52.2 | −17.7 |
| Independent | Peter Kyle | 10,387 | 47.8 | +47.8 |
| Liberal hold | | Swing | −17.7 | |
