= Electoral results for the district of Hillarys =

Western Australian district election results

This is a list of electoral results for the electoral district of Hillarys in Western Australian state elections.

== Members for Hillarys ==
Member	Party	Term
Rob Johnson	Liberal	1996–2016
Rob Johnson	Independent	2016–2017
Peter Katsambanis	Liberal	2017–2021
Caitlin Collins	Labor	2021–present

== Election results ==
=== Elections in the 2020s ===
2025 Western Australian state election: Hillarys
Party	Candidate	Votes	%	±%
Labor	Caitlin Collins	15,021	52.5	−8.7
Liberal	Lisa Olsson	9,825	34.3	+7.4
Greens	Nicholas D'Alonzo	2,733	9.6	+4.4
Christians	Dwight Randall	1,026	3.6	+3.4
Total formal votes		28,605	96.7	−0.2
Informal votes		977	3.3	+0.2
Turnout		29,582	89.0	+3.2
Two-party-preferred result
Labor	Caitlin Collins	17,280	60.5	−8.3
Liberal	Lisa Olsson	11,298	39.5	+8.3
Labor hold		Swing	−8.3	

Results are not final. Last updated on 25 March 2025 at 11:30 AM AWST

2021 Western Australian state election: Hillarys
Party	Candidate	Votes	%	±%
Labor	Caitlin Collins	15,671	61.4	+28.1
Liberal	Peter Katsambanis	6,900	27.0	−11.0
Greens	Greg Glazov	1,366	5.4	−3.9
Legalise Cannabis	Katrina Winfield	582	2.3	+2.3
No Mandatory Vaccination	W. Seeto	476	1.9	+1.9
Liberals for Climate	Rick Tylka	339	1.3	+1.3
WAxit	Zoran Jankulovski	184	0.7	+0.5
Total formal votes		25,518	97.0	+0.9
Informal votes		802	3.0	−0.9
Turnout		26,320	88.1	−0.3
Two-party-preferred result
Labor	Caitlin Collins	17,597	69.0	+19.3
Liberal	Peter Katsambanis	7,919	31.0	−19.3
Labor gain from Liberal		Swing	+19.3	

=== Elections in the 2010s ===
2017 Western Australian state election: Hillarys
Party	Candidate	Votes	%	±%
Liberal	Peter Katsambanis	9,343	39.6	−21.7
Labor	Teresa Ritchie	6,773	28.7	+2.5
Independent	Rob Johnson	4,745	20.1	+20.1
Greens	Louahna Lloyd	2,124	9.0	−0.8
Christians	Elisabete Robinson	590	2.5	−0.2
Total formal votes		23,575	96.2	+1.8
Informal votes		938	3.8	−1.8
Turnout		24,513	88.9	+0.7
Two-party-preferred result
Liberal	Peter Katsambanis	12,749	54.1	−11.9
Labor	Teresa Ritchie	10,820	45.9	+11.9
Liberal hold		Swing	−11.9	

2013 Western Australian state election: Hillarys
Party	Candidate	Votes	%	±%
Liberal	Rob Johnson	13,484	64.3	+11.3
Labor	Sam Thomas	4,934	23.5	–3.9
Greens	Adam Collins	2,015	9.6	–2.3
Christians	Michael Ford	545	2.6	–0.1
Total formal votes		20,978	94.5	−0.4
Informal votes		1,232	5.5	+0.4
Turnout		22,210	90.3	
Two-party-preferred result
Liberal	Rob Johnson	14,463	69.0	+6.1
Labor	Sam Thomas	6,507	31.0	–6.1
Liberal hold		Swing	+6.1	

=== Elections in the 2000s ===
2008 Western Australian state election: Hillarys
Party	Candidate	Votes	%	±%
Liberal	Rob Johnson	10,471	52.9	+7.4
Labor	Kym Endersby	5,633	28.4	−8.0
Greens	Barry Redhead	2,610	13.2	+5.0
Christian Democrats	Norman Henley	572	2.9	−0.2
Family First	Moyna Rapp	522	2.6	−0.9
Total formal votes		19,808	94.9	−0.3
Informal votes		1,071	5.1	+0.3
Turnout		20,879	88.2	
Two-party-preferred result
Liberal	Rob Johnson	12,145	61.4	+7.8
Labor	Kym Endersby	7,648	38.6	−7.8
Liberal hold		Swing	+7.8	

2005 Western Australian state election: Hillarys
Party	Candidate	Votes	%	±%
Liberal	Rob Johnson	11,462	46.2	+3.7
Labor	Anna Spadaccini	8,881	35.8	+4.6
Greens	Chris Twomey	2,025	8.2	−0.6
Family First	Ken Loughton	861	3.5	+3.5
Independent	John Bombak	808	3.3	+3.3
Christian Democrats	Perry McKerlie	760	3.1	+0.4
Total formal votes		24,797	95.3	−0.6
Informal votes		1,220	4.7	+0.6
Turnout		26,017	91.5	
Two-party-preferred result
Liberal	Rob Johnson	13,428	54.2	−0.2
Labor	Anna Spadaccini	11,359	45.8	+0.2
Liberal hold		Swing	−0.2	

2001 Western Australian state election: Hillarys
Party	Candidate	Votes	%	±%
Liberal	Rob Johnson	9,570	40.1	−13.2
Labor	Lorraine Allen	8,359	35.0	+2.2
Greens	Andrew Roy	2,287	9.6	+9.6
One Nation	Sue Collins	1,660	7.0	+7.0
Democrats	Clive Oliver	764	3.2	−10.6
Christian Democrats	Stuart Chapman	680	2.8	+2.8
Independent	Eugene Hands	553	2.3	+2.3
Total formal votes		23,873	95.5	−0.1
Informal votes		1,123	4.5	+0.1
Turnout		24,996	91.4	
Two-party-preferred result
Liberal	Rob Johnson	12,111	51.0	−8.9
Labor	Lorraine Allen	11,616	49.0	+8.9
Liberal hold		Swing	−8.9	

=== Elections in the 1990s ===
1996 Western Australian state election: Hillarys
Party	Candidate	Votes	%	±%
Liberal	Rob Johnson	12,085	53.3	+2.6
Labor	Tony O'Gorman	7,442	32.8	−1.0
Democrats	Sylvia Smith	3,139	13.8	+9.3
Total formal votes		22,666	95.6	−1.3
Informal votes		1,036	4.4	+1.3
Turnout		23,702	91.3	
Two-party-preferred result
Liberal	Rob Johnson	13,544	59.9	+0.9
Labor	Tony O'Gorman	9,081	40.1	−0.9
Liberal hold		Swing	+0.9	
