= Mazenod College =

Mazenod College may refer to:

- Mazenod College, Victoria, a Roman Catholic high school in Mulgrave, Victoria
- Mazenod College, Western Australia, a Roman Catholic high school in Lesmurdie, Western Australia
