= Electoral results for the district of Cottesloe =

Western Australian district election results

This is a list of electoral results for the electoral district of Cottesloe in Western Australian state elections.

== Members for Cottesloe ==
Member	Party	Term
Ross Hutchinson	Liberal	1950–1977
Bill Hassell	Liberal	1977–1990
Colin Barnett	Liberal	1990–2018
David Honey	Liberal	2018–2025
Sandra Brewer	Liberal	2025–present

== Election results ==
=== Elections in the 2020s ===
2025 Western Australian state election: Cottesloe
Party	Candidate	Votes	%	±%
Liberal	Sandra Brewer	14,612	50.7	+3.8
Independent	Rachel Horncastle	7,771	26.9	+26.9
Labor	Amy Astill	3,445	11.9	−16.4
Greens	Heidi Hardisty	2,376	8.2	−4.4
Legalise Cannabis	Jessica Yu	636	2.2	+2.2
Total formal votes		28,840	97.8	+0.4
Informal votes		657	2.2	−0.4
Turnout		29,497	89.0	+3.2
Two-candidate-preferred result
Liberal	Sandra Brewer	16,019	55.6	−1.9
Independent	Rachel Horncastle	12,817	44.4	+44.4
Liberal hold				

2021 Western Australian state election: Cottesloe
Party	Candidate	Votes	%	±%
Liberal	David Honey	12,624	46.8	−10.7
Labor	Gemma West	7,637	28.3	+6.2
Greens	Theresa Moss	3,410	12.7	+0.8
Independent	Tony Parker	2,670	9.9	+9.9
No Mandatory Vaccination	R. Drayton	329	1.2	+1.2
WAxit	Paul Batsioudis	276	1.0	+0.2
Total formal votes		26,946	97.4	+0.8
Informal votes		715	2.6	−0.8
Turnout		27,661	88.6	+0.2
Two-party-preferred result
Liberal	David Honey	15,470	57.4	−6.6
Labor	Gemma West	11,470	42.6	+6.6
Liberal hold		Swing	−6.6	

=== Elections in the 2010s ===
2018 Cottesloe state by-election
Party	Candidate	Votes	%	±%
Liberal	David Honey	10,872	59.9	+3.2
Greens	Greg Boland	3,555	19.6	+7.5
Western Australia	Ron Norris	1,636	9.0	+9.0
Independent	Michael Tucak	977	5.4	+5.4
Micro Business	Cam Tinley	605	3.3	+3.3
Independent	Michael Thomas	402	2.2	+2.2
Independent	Dmitry Malov	112	0.6	+0.2
Total formal votes		18,159	98.0	+1.4
Informal votes		364	2.0	−1.4
Turnout		18,523	66.6	−21.8
Two-candidate-preferred result
Liberal	David Honey	12,738	70.2	+6.9
Greens	Greg Boland	5,416	29.8	+29.8
Liberal hold		Swing	+6.9	

2017 Western Australian state election: Cottesloe
Party	Candidate	Votes	%	±%
Liberal	Colin Barnett	13,264	56.7	−8.1
Labor	Caitlin Collins	5,280	22.6	+10.4
Greens	Greg Boland	2,826	12.1	+1.8
Independent	Alida Lancee	1,332	5.7	+5.7
Christians	Riaan Groenewald	226	1.0	−0.3
Micro Business	Nicole Poppas	198	0.8	+0.8
	Michael Watson	176	0.8	+0.8
Independent	Dmitry Malov	103	0.4	+0.4
Total formal votes		23,405	96.6	+0.1
Informal votes		819	3.4	−0.1
Turnout		24,224	88.4	+0.1
Two-party-preferred result
Liberal	Colin Barnett	14,799	63.3	−7.8
Labor	Caitlin Collins	8,590	36.7	+7.8
Liberal hold		Swing	−7.8	

2013 Western Australian state election: Cottesloe
Party	Candidate	Votes	%	±%
Liberal	Colin Barnett	14,036	64.7	+1.2
Labor	Emma Williams	2,650	12.2	–5.3
Independent	Kevin Morgan	2,482	11.4	+11.4
Greens	Greg Boland	2,246	10.4	–6.7
Christians	Neil Fearis	281	1.3	–0.7
Total formal votes		21,695	96.5	+0.8
Informal votes		781	3.5	−0.8
Turnout		22,476	90.0	
Two-party-preferred result
Liberal	Colin Barnett	15,380	70.9	+1.5
Labor	Emma Williams	6,307	29.1	–1.5
Liberal hold		Swing	+1.5	

=== Elections in the 2000s ===
2008 Western Australian state election: Cottesloe
Party	Candidate	Votes	%	±%
Liberal	Colin Barnett	12,552	63.45	+7.8
Labor	Dave Hume	3,470	17.54	−7.0
Greens	Greg Boland	3,366	17.02	+0.1
Christian Democrats	Pat Seymour	393	1.99	−1.1
Total formal votes		19,781	95.74	
Informal votes		880	4.26	
Turnout		20.661	85.96	
Two-party-preferred result
Liberal	Colin Barnett	13,729	69.42	+7.9
Labor	Dave Hume	6,047	30.58	−7.9
Liberal hold		Swing	+7.9	

2005 Western Australian state election: Cottesloe
Party	Candidate	Votes	%	±%
Liberal	Colin Barnett	13,446	55.66	+4.9
Labor	Owen Whittle	5,965	24.69	+2.5
Greens	Steve Walker	3,997	16.55	+3.2
Christian Democrats	Stuart Chapman	750	3.10	+3.10
Total formal votes		24,158	96.57	−0.71
Informal votes		857	3.43	+0.71
Turnout		25,015	89.74	+0.93
Two-party-preferred result
Liberal	Colin Barnett	14,910	61.73	−0.7
Labor	Owen Whittle	9,245	38.27	+0.7
Liberal hold		Swing	−0.7	

2001 Western Australian state election: Cottesloe
Party	Candidate	Votes	%	±%
Liberal	Colin Barnett	11,034	51.9	−8.6
Labor	Simon Nield	4,946	23.3	+5.2
Greens	Steve Walker	3,046	14.3	+0.5
One Nation	Dianne Kenworthy	1,138	5.4	+5.4
Democrats	Andrew Winchester	1,104	5.2	−2.3
Total formal votes		21,268	97.3	+0.1
Informal votes		600	2.7	−0.1
Turnout		21,868	88.8	
Two-party-preferred result
Liberal	Colin Barnett	12,998	61.3	−8.5
Labor	Simon Nield	8,189	38.7	+8.5
Liberal hold		Swing	−8.5	

=== Elections in the 1990s ===
1996 Western Australian state election: Cottesloe
Party	Candidate	Votes	%	±%
Liberal	Colin Barnett	12,572	60.5	−1.6
Labor	Paul Cecchini	3,766	18.1	−1.0
Greens	Steve Walker	2,874	13.8	+3.7
Democrats	Ken Meyer	1,560	7.5	+3.8
Total formal votes		20,772	97.2	−0.3
Informal votes		602	2.8	+0.3
Turnout		21,374	88.0	
Two-party-preferred result
Liberal	Colin Barnett	14,462	69.8	−2.2
Labor	Paul Cecchini	6,268	30.2	+2.2
Liberal hold		Swing	−2.2	

1993 Western Australian state election: Cottesloe
Party	Candidate	Votes	%	±%
Liberal	Colin Barnett	12,503	65.0	+5.5
Labor	James Wearne	3,943	20.5	−5.9
Greens	Giz Watson	2,047	10.6	+10.6
Democrats	Michael Barrett	748	3.9	−3.3
Total formal votes		19,241	97.5	+2.6
Informal votes		501	2.5	−2.6
Turnout		19,742	92.9	+4.1
Two-party-preferred result
Liberal	Colin Barnett	13,699	71.2	+4.4
Labor	James Wearne	5,542	28.8	−4.4
Liberal hold		Swing	+4.4	

1990 Cottesloe state by-election
Party	Candidate	Votes	%	±%
Liberal	Colin Barnett	7,708	52.5	−6.9
Greens	Mary Salter	2,031	13.8	+13.8
Independent	Ross Hutchinson	1,884	12.8	+12.8
	Peter Weygers	1,747	11.9	+11.9
Democrats	Richard Jeffreys	777	5.3	−1.9
Grey Power	Douglas Ratcliffe	278	1.9	−5.0
Independent	William Hunt	204	1.4	+1.4
	Tony Bozich	63	0.4	+0.4
Total formal votes		14,692	96.7	+1.8
Informal votes		493	3.3	−1.8
Turnout		15,185	69.6	−19.2
Two-candidate-preferred result
Liberal	Colin Barnett	10,323	70.3	+3.5
Greens	Mary Salter	4,369	29.7	+29.7
Liberal hold		Swing	N/A	

=== Elections in the 1980s ===
1989 Western Australian state election: Cottesloe
Party	Candidate	Votes	%	±%
Liberal	Bill Hassell	10,824	59.4	+1.6
Labor	John Noonan	4,811	26.4	−15.8
Democrats	Martina Hagues	1,318	7.2	+7.2
Grey Power	Marianne McCall	1,255	6.9	+6.9
Total formal votes		18,208	94.9	
Informal votes		980	5.1	
Turnout		19,188	88.8	
Two-party-preferred result
Liberal	Bill Hassell	12,169	66.8	+9.0
Labor	John Noonan	6,039	33.2	−9.0
Liberal hold		Swing	+9.0	

1986 Western Australian state election: Cottesloe
Party	Candidate	Votes	%	±%
Liberal	Bill Hassell	9,451	58.2	+5.3
Labor	John Noonan	6,789	41.8	+2.2
Total formal votes		16,420	98.0	+0.1
Informal votes		338	2.0	−0.1
Turnout		16,578	89.1	+1.2
Liberal hold		Swing	+1.9	

1983 Western Australian state election: Cottesloe
Party	Candidate	Votes	%	±%
Liberal	Bill Hassell	7,748	52.9	
Labor	Leslie Heinrich	5,791	39.6	
Democrats	Marjorie McKercher	890	6.1	
Independent	Alfred Bussell	215	1.5	
Total formal votes		14,644	97.9	
Informal votes		312	2.1	
Turnout		14,956	87.9	
Two-party-preferred result
Liberal	Bill Hassell	8,245	56.3	
Labor	Leslie Heinrich	6,399	43.7	
Liberal hold		Swing		

1980 Western Australian state election: Cottesloe
Party	Candidate	Votes	%	±%
Liberal	Bill Hassell	7,191	55.2	−4.5
Labor	Richard Grounds	5,842	44.8	+4.5
Total formal votes		13,033	97.7	0.0
Informal votes		309	2.3	0.0
Turnout		13,342	87.0	−2.5
Liberal hold		Swing	−4.5	

=== Elections in the 1970s ===
1977 Western Australian state election: Cottesloe
Party	Candidate	Votes	%	±%
Liberal	Bill Hassell	8,147	59.7	
Labor	Howard Olney	5,489	40.3	
Total formal votes		13,636	97.7	
Informal votes		324	2.3	
Turnout		13,960	89.5	
Liberal hold		Swing		

1974 Western Australian state election: Cottesloe
Party	Candidate	Votes	%	±%
Liberal	Ross Hutchinson	7,233	52.7	
Labor	Graham Rattigan	5,438	39.6	
National Alliance	Oldham Prestage	726	5.3	
Australia	Charles Pierce	338	2.5	
Total formal votes		13,735	97.0	
Informal votes		430	3.0	
Turnout		14,165	88.4	
Two-party-preferred result
Liberal	Ross Hutchinson	8,019	58.4	
Labor	Graham Rattigan	5,716	41.6	
Liberal hold		Swing		

1971 Western Australian state election: Cottesloe
Party	Candidate	Votes	%	±%
Liberal	Ross Hutchinson	6,611	53.6	−3.7
Labor	Howard Olney	4,830	39.2	+1.9
Democratic Labor	Keith Carton	881	7.2	+7.2
Total formal votes		12,322	97.3	−0.9
Informal votes		346	2.7	+0.9
Turnout		12,668	90.3	−0.5
Two-party-preferred result
Liberal	Ross Hutchinson	7,360	59.7	−0.3
Labor	Howard Olney	4,962	40.3	+0.3
Liberal hold		Swing	−0.3	

=== Elections in the 1960s ===
1968 Western Australian state election: Cottesloe
Party	Candidate	Votes	%	±%
Liberal and Country	Ross Hutchinson	6,643	57.3	
Labor	Christopher Caldwell	4,325	37.3	
Independent	Lola Griggs	620	5.4	
Total formal votes		11,588	98.2	
Informal votes		214	1.8	
Turnout		11,802	90.8	
Two-party-preferred result
Liberal and Country	Ross Hutchinson	6,953	60.0	
Labor	Christopher Caldwell	4,635	40.0	
Liberal and Country hold		Swing		

1965 Western Australian state election: Cottesloe
Party	Candidate	Votes	%	±%
Liberal and Country	Ross Hutchinson	5,954	61.7	+4.9
Labor	Richard Bryant	3,697	38.3	−4.9
Total formal votes		9,651	98.3	−0.7
Informal votes		162	1.7	+0.7
Turnout		9,813	91.6	−0.8
Liberal and Country hold		Swing	+4.9	

1962 Western Australian state election: Cottesloe
Party	Candidate	Votes	%	±%
Liberal and Country	Ross Hutchinson	5,666	56.8	
Labor	David Wright	4,310	43.2	
Total formal votes		9,976	99.0	
Informal votes		96	1.0	
Turnout		10,072	92.4	
Liberal and Country hold		Swing		

=== Elections in the 1950s ===
1959 Western Australian state election: Cottesloe
Party	Candidate	Votes	%	±%
Liberal and Country	Ross Hutchinson	5,058	59.9	−8.1
Labor	Edmund Edwards	3,379	40.1	+40.1
Total formal votes		8,437	98.8	+1.8
Informal votes		99	1.2	−1.8
Turnout		8,536	92.2	+0.2
Liberal and Country hold		Swing	N/A	

1956 Western Australian state election: Cottesloe
Party	Candidate	Votes	%	±%
Liberal and Country	Ross Hutchinson	5,781	68.0	
Independent	Leonard Stratton	2,717	32.0	
Total formal votes		8,498	97.0	
Informal votes		259	3.0	
Turnout		8,757	92.0	
Liberal and Country hold		Swing		

1953 Western Australian state election: Cottesloe
Party	Candidate	Votes	%	±%
Liberal and Country	Ross Hutchinson	4,479	60.1	+0.3
Labor	Diana Hart	2,969	39.9	−0.3
Total formal votes		7,448	98.4	−0.6
Informal votes		118	1.6	+0.6
Turnout		7,566	93.6	+2.9
Liberal and Country hold		Swing	+0.3	

1950 Western Australian state election: Cottesloe
Party	Candidate	Votes	%	±%
Liberal and Country	Ross Hutchinson	4,619	59.8	
Labor	John Vivian	3,103	41.2	
Total formal votes		7,722	99.0	
Informal votes		76	1.0	
Turnout		7,798	90.7	
Liberal and Country hold		Swing		
