= St Brigid's College =

School in Perth, Western Australia

St Brigids College
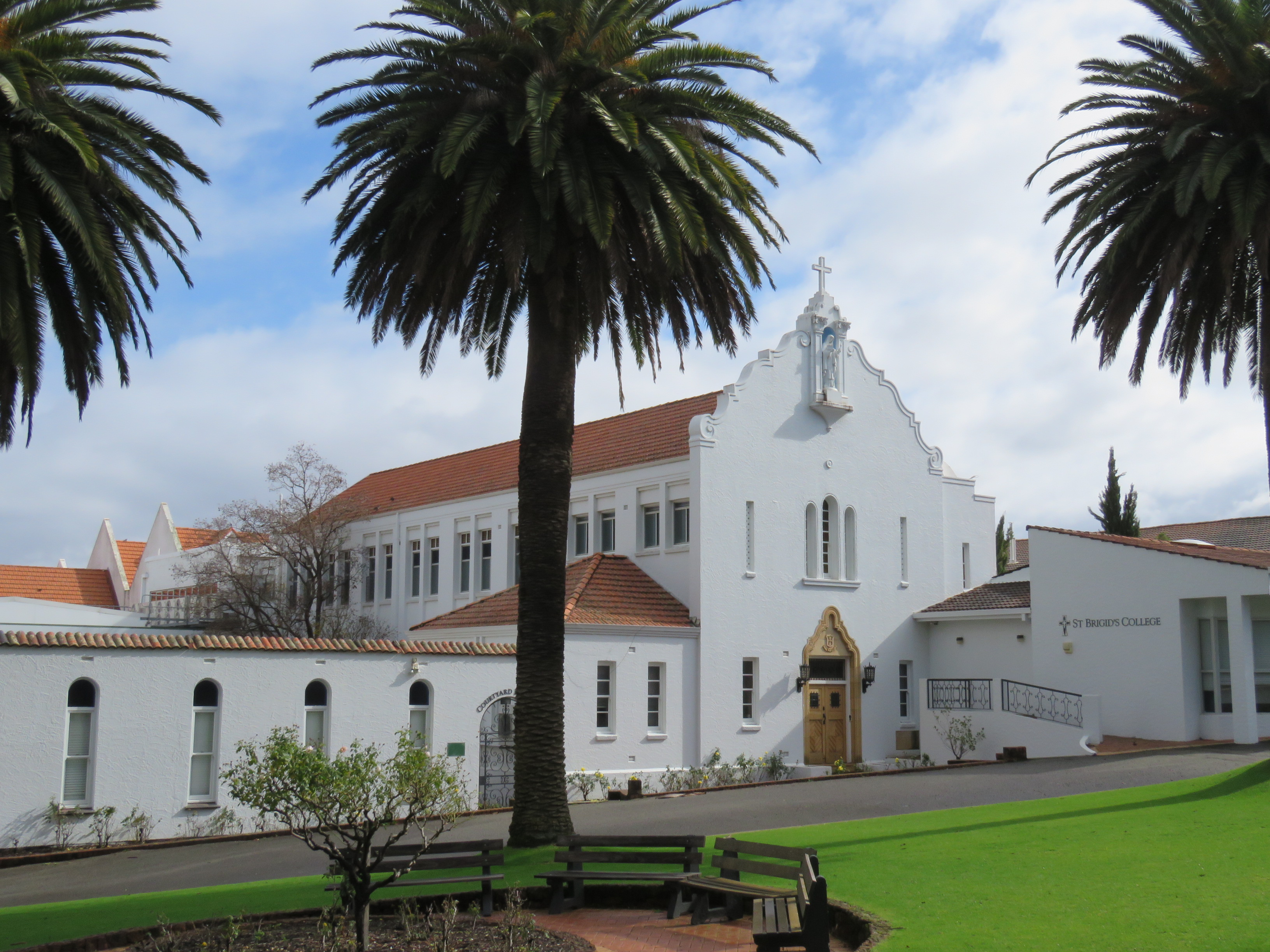
- St Brigid's College in June 2026

Location
- 200 Lesmurdie Road, Lesmurdie, Perth, Western Australia; Australia
- 31°59′46″S 116°03′05″E

Information
- Type: Independent co-educational primary and single-sex secondary day and boarding school
- Motto: Latin: Virtus Sola Nobilitat (Virtue Alone Enobles)
- Religious affiliation: Sisters of Mercy
- Denomination: Roman Catholicism
- Patron saint: Saint Brigid of Kildare
- Established: 21 April 1929; 97 years ago
- Educational authority: WA Department of Education
- Principal: Veronica Parker
- Staff: ~110
- Years: K–12
- Gender: Girls only: 7–12; Co-educational: K–6
- Enrolment: ~1,200
- Colours: Green and gold
- Affiliation: Alliance of Girls' Schools Australasia

Brother school

Western Australia Heritage Register
- Type: State Registered Place
- Reference no.: 1261
- Mazenod College
- Website: www.stbrigids.wa.edu.au

St Brigid's College is an independent Roman Catholic co-educational primary and single-sex secondary day and boarding school for girls, located in Lesmurdie, a suburb of Perth, Western Australia.

The campus consists of a school for girls only in Year 7 to Year 12 and a co-educational junior school for boys and girls in Year K to Year 6, sporting grounds, and boarding facilities for 137 students. The college's brother school is Mazenod College, where many male students attending St Brigid's Primary School continue their education.

== History ==
St Brigid's College was founded in 1929 by the Sisters of Mercy as an extension of the West Perth convent and college also named after Saint Brigid of Kildare. Construction of the buildings commenced in 1913 for Archibald and Maude Sanderson, and were used as a private day and boarding school for approximately 20 students.

In 1919, at the end of World War I, the buildings were sold to the Red Cross to be rented to the Repatriation Department to house sick and wounded soldiers. During this period the building was completed and oak trees from Windsor Castle were planted in the grounds.

In 1929, the building was let to the Perth Hospital as a convalescent home. Later in that same year, it was sold to the Sisters of Mercy for £A 9,000, equivalent to A$800,800 in 2022. It was purchased by the Congregational Superior, Reverend Mother Brigid Watson. On 21 April 1929, Mother Teresa Rielly and seven Sisters took up residence with their first pupils: 35 boarders and 3-day students.

In 2005 St Brigid's College was entered in the Register of Heritage Places by the Heritage Council of Western Australia.

== Campus ==
St Brigid's College is located in the suburb of Lesmurdie, which is atop the Darling Scarp in Perth. The school falls into the South Ward of the City of Kalamunda.

The campus has been extended over its history as funds and space have become available. A Sisters Convent and Chapel was constructed in 1965 as an addition to the original building, which has been listed on the Western Australian Register of Heritage Places. This was followed in 1990 by the construction of a 157-person boarding house to the rear of the campus.

The McAuley Wing was constructed in 1999 as a dedicated technology, science and art building.

One of the college's additions is the Sister Mary Rose Fitness Centre, completed in 2002, which houses an indoor heated swimming pool, sprung dance floor and fitness equipment. The facility is available for paid use by the public.

2012 heralded the completion of the new One World Centre, a A$13-million building created on 372 square metres (4,000 sq ft) of land which was once a road called Catherine Place that separated the Junior School from the Middle and Senior schools. The One World Centre includes a new innovative library and resource space titled the Learning Plaza, student and public administration, staff offices and facilities as well as the Wandju room, a multi-purpose hall which uses the Noongar word for 'welcome' as its namesake.

In 2013, plans were announced in the Friends of St Brigid's College magazine for a new addition to the college, a performing arts facility, the building of which will commence in 2014.

== Curriculum ==
St Brigid's College was an accredited International Baccalaureate World School, meeting the standards and practices of the Primary Years Programme and the Middle Years Programme. St Brigid's College was the only IB catholic school in Western Australia and one of only a handful overall in the state to attain this status. St Brigid's ceased to offer the IB curriculum in 2021.

== Community service ==
St Brigid's contributes to the community through community service activities including school-wide projects such as fundraising and food drives on behalf of charities. Students in years 7 to 12 are also involved in a service-learning program called Mercy in Action - Making A Difference, which encourages the spirit of mercy as espoused by Catherine McAuley, the founder of the Sisters of Mercy. This program requires students to complete a number of community service hours each year as part of their Religious Education study. Some of the suggested activities in Years 11 and 12 are blood donation, Red Cross soup patrol, peer mentoring and assisting community organisations.

As part of the service-learning component to St Brigid's College, each year a group of staff and students visit a Mercy Sisters outpost in Cambodia, having raised money and donations to contribute to communities there. In addition to this there is the Northwest Immersion trip, in which a group of staff and students visit communities in the North-West of Western Australia and donate time and charitable works.

== House system ==
The college houses are named after significant persons in the history of the college and the Sisters of Mercy:

- McAuley – named after Venerable Catherine McAuley, founder of the Sisters of Mercy;
- Watson – named after Mother Bridget Watson, the Congregational Superior who purchased the original buildings from the Red Cross;
- Reilly – named after Mother Teresa Reilly, who was the Mother of the original Sisters working at the school;
- Docherty – named after The Docherty family, who provided support for the boarding school, as well as establishing the expansive lawns which provide greenery to much of the campus;
- Shine – named after Sister Phillip Shine, noted for her contribution to the musical education of the students.
- O'Connor – named after Catherine O'Connor

== Notable alumni ==
- Tamara Bleszynski – Indonesian actress, singer, and model.
- Linda Reynolds – Australian politician and senator for Western Australia
- Priya Cooper, OAM – 9x Paralympic swimming gold medalist

== See also ==
- Catholic education in Australia
- List of schools in the Perth metropolitan area
- List of boarding schools in Australia
