= Mazenod College, Perth =

Mazenod College
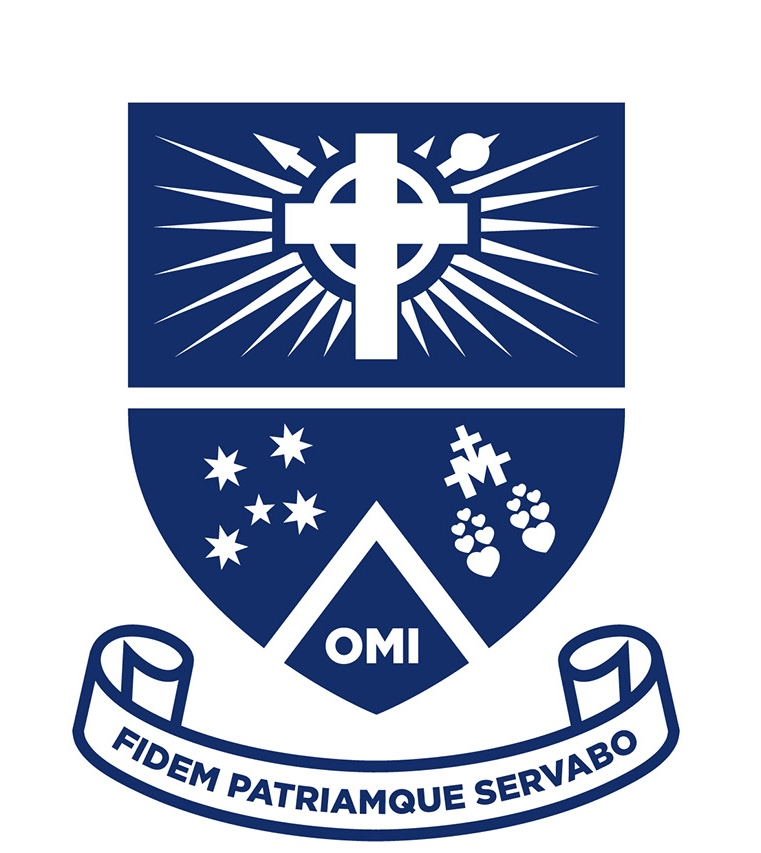
- The coat of arms of Mazenod College.

Location
- Lesmurdie, Western Australia; Australia; 32°00′24″S 116°02′20″E

Information
- Type: Independent single-sex secondary day and boarding school
- Motto: Latin: Fidem Patriamque Servabo (I Serve My God and my Country)
- Religious affiliation: Oblates of Mary Immaculate
- Denomination: Catholicism
- Established: 1966; 60 years ago
- Sister school: St Brigid's College
- Educational authority: WA Department of Education
- Principal: Sabrina Hughes
- Staff: 200
- Gender: Boys
- Enrolment: 900
- Colours: Blue and white
- School fees: 9000 AUD (average)
- Affiliation: Associated and Catholic Colleges of Western Australia
- Website: mazenod.wa.edu.au

Mazenod College is an independent Roman Catholic single-sex secondary day and boarding school for boys, located in the eastern Perth suburb of Lesmurdie, Western Australia. It is one of three schools run by the Oblates of Mary Immaculate (OMI) and the only OMI school in Western Australia.

== History ==
=== Establishment ===
In 1965 two priests, Father Ian Mackintosh and Father Dennis Mcarthy of the Missionary Oblates of Mary Immaculate, with aid from Member of Parliament Kenneth Dunn had approval from the Western Australian Government to begin land clearing to build the college. Land clearing began in May 1965, with the first buildings finished in a year. The school opened to 6 and 7th grade students in 14 February 1966. The school officially opened on 8 May 1966, with a boarding school facility opening the following year. The school was founded by the Missionary Oblates of Mary Immaculate, and is a fee-paying private education secondary school.

=== Subsequent history ===
The school has had significant changes since its establishment in 1966. Between 2006 and 2010, the college built a new administration building and new student facilities in the north side of the campus. In 2018, the college built a state of the art D & T centre, offering students access to facilities useful for an apprenticeship. The college has modern facilities supporting a modern 21st century education system. The school caters to all students with university and apprenticeship programmes, for older students.

In August 2025, Sabrina Hughes was appointed to lead the school from the 2026 school year, becoming the first female principal for an all-boys school in Western Australia.

== House system ==
The college houses are named after significant persons in the history of the Missionary Oblates of Mary Immaculate. These houses were formed to promote student fitness, as the houses competed in school sport competitions.

=== The houses ===
- Gavin – named after Father Felix Gavine
- Grandin – named after Bishop Vital Grandin
- Gerard – named after Father Joseph Gerard
- Albini – named after Father Charles albini
- Cebula – named after Father Joseph Cebula
- Tempier – named after Father Henri Tempier

st gene

== Uniform ==
Mazenod College enforces a uniform policy for students with variations depending on season.

== Alumni ==
Mazenod College alumni are called Mazenodians. The college has an alumni association known as the Mazenod Old Boys.

=== Notable alumni ===
- Liam Staltari – Member of Legislative Assembly for Carine
- Daniel Bandy – Australian rules footballer with the Fremantle and Western Bulldogs Football Clubs.
- John Bestall – hockey and Olympian.
- Luke Blackwell – Australian rules footballer with the Carlton Football Club, 2011 Sandover Medallist.
- Dean Capobianco – 200-metre runner & 1990 Stawell Gift winner.
- Scott Cummings – Australian rules footballer with the Essendon, West Coast Eagles, Collingwood and Port Adelaide Football Clubs.
- Harry Edwards – Australian rules footballer with the West Coast Eagles.
- Paul Hasleby – Australian rules footballer with the Fremantle Football Club.
- Matt Keogh – Federal Member for Burt.
- Greg Moriarty – Australian Ambassador to the United States of America. Former Chief of Staff to Prime Minister Malcolm Turnbull.

== See also ==
- List of schools in the Perth metropolitan area
- List of boarding schools in Australia
