= Katie Hodson-Thomas =

Australian politician (born 1957)

Katie Hodson-Thomas OAM

Member of the Western Australian Legislative Assembly for Carine
- In office 14 December 1996 – 6 September 2008
- Preceded by: New seat
- Succeeded by: Tony Krsticevic

Personal details
- Born: 28 April 1957 (age 69) Norwood, South Australia
- Party: Liberal

Katina Hodson-Thomas OAM (born 28 April 1957) is an Australian politician who was a Liberal member of the Western Australian Legislative Assembly representing the electorate of Carine after winning the seat in the 1996 election. She was subsequently re-elected to the seat in 2001 and 2005 but retired just before the 2008 election.

Born in Norwood, South Australia, a suburb of Adelaide, South Australia, she was educated at the local high school before leaving to arrive in Western Australia in 1987.

As the shadow minister for transport, Hodson-Thomas was critical of the government's route for the Mandurah line, claiming that the former Court government's Kenwick route was better. She also claimed in 2002 that the government had "grossly over-estimated" patronage on the line. After the line opened in 2007, patronage was significantly higher than projected.

In January 2008, Hodson-Thomas announced that she would retire from politics at the end of her term. She left the party as a result of a bitter leadership feud between Paul Omodei and then-leader Troy Buswell, and after Buswell had made inappropriate sexist comments to her in front of a large number of male colleagues, for which Buswell later apologised. She went on to remark that the state parliament was a boys' club and the male members need to lift their standards.

Her successor in Carine was Tony Krsticevic who won pre-selection and then the seat in the 2008 election.

In the 2026 Australia Day Honours, Hodson-Thomas was awarded the Medal of the Order of Australia for "service to the people and Parliament of Western Australia".

Western Australian Legislative Assembly
New seat	Member for Carine; 1996–2008	Succeeded by Tony Krsticevic
