= Rob Johnson (Australian politician) =

Australian politician (born 1943)

The Honourable Rob Johnson OAM

Minister for Police, Emergency Services and Road Safety
- In office 23 September 2008 – 29 June 2012

Member of the Western Australian Parliament for Hillarys
- In office 14 December 1996 – 11 March 2017
- Preceded by: New creation
- Succeeded by: Peter Katsambanis

Member of the Western Australian Parliament for Whitford
- In office 6 February 1993 – 14 December 1996
- Preceded by: Pam Beggs

Personal details
- Born: 17 October 1943 (age 82) London, England
- Party: Liberal (to 2016)
- Other political affiliations: Independent (from 2016)
- Profession: Company chairman

Robert Frank Johnson OAM (born 17 October 1943) is an Australian former politician who was a member of the Legislative Assembly of Western Australia from 1993 to 2017. He was elected as a member of the Liberal Party, and served as a minister in the government of Colin Barnett from 2008 to 2012, but resigned from the party in April 2016 to sit as an independent . He was defeated at the 2017 election.

== Political career ==
=== Local politics ===
Johnson was born in London, England. At the age of 35, he was elected as a councillor for the London Borough of Sutton and subsequently became Mayor.

Soon after emigrating to Australia in 1988, he was elected as a councillor to the City of Wanneroo in 1991. The following year he was elected Mayor.

=== Western Australian Parliament ===
Johnson was elected as the member for Whitford in 1993 and, following a re-distribution of boundaries, was re-elected for the seat of Hillarys in 1996.

From December 1999 until February 2001, Johnson served in the Court Coalition government, as Minister for Works, Services, Citizenship and Multicultural Interests. He became Minister for Police, Emergency Services and Road Safety with the return to power of the Coalition in September 2008.

Johnson supports reintroducing the Death Penalty, in 2007 he lobbied the Western Australia liberal party to adopt a policy on capital punishment.

In his first two years as minister in the new Barnett government, Johnson introduced 16 bills into the Legislative Assembly. Many of them were controversial and high-profile, including increasing the impounding period of a vehicle for anyone convicted of a "hoon" offence. Other measures were to ensure motorists with a blood alcohol reading of 0.08 or above lost their licence immediately at the roadside, that all revenue from speed and red light cameras would go to road safety projects, and a proposal for Australia's first online sex offender register.

Investigations following a major bushfire in the Perth hills in February 2011, with the loss of 71 homes, and another in the Margaret River area, resulted in severe criticism of Johnson, and he was removed from the Emergency Services portfolio.

In May 2012, federal Liberal MP for Canning, Don Randall, attacked Johnson in Federal Parliament, labelling him bumbling, weak and incompetent. In turn, Johnson called for Randall to be sacked over the misuse of travel expenses.

After a cabinet reshuffle by premier Colin Barnett in June 2012, Johnson was removed from the Police and Road Safety portfolio. At the 2013 Western Australian state election, he was re-elected to the seat of Hillarys.

== Business career ==
After arriving in Australia, Johnson started a family business incorporating an investment firm and a national computer distributorship.

He is a former chair of Radio Lollipop (Australia), a charity that cares for children in hospital.

Western Australian Legislative Assembly
Preceded by Pam Beggs	Member for Whitford; 1993–1996	Succeeded by Seat abolished
New seat	Member for Hillarys; 1996–2017	Succeeded by Peter Katsambanis
