= Caitlin Collins =

Australian politician (born 1988)

Caitlin Collins MLA
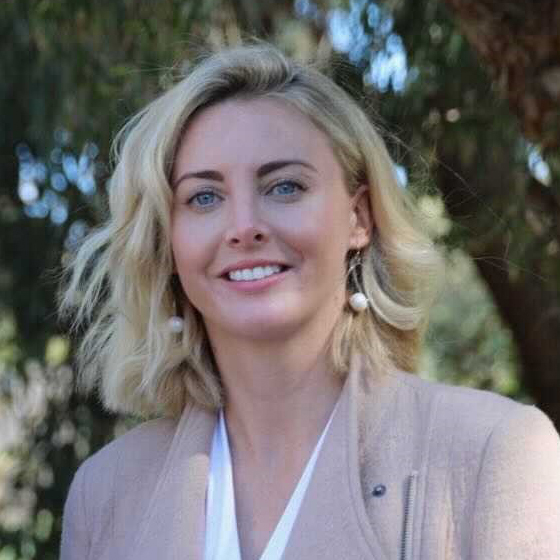
- Caitlin Collins at Bambara Primary School during the 2021 WA State Election.

Member of the Western Australian Legislative Assembly for Hillarys
- Incumbent
- Assumed office 13 March 2021
- Preceded by: Peter Katsambanis

Personal details
- Born: Caitlin Mary Collins; 22 July 1988 (age 37) Aberdeen, Scotland
- Party: Labor
- Website: www.caitlincollins.com.au

Caitlin Mary Collins (born 22 July 1988) is an Australian politician. She has been a Labor member of the Western Australian Legislative Assembly since the 2021 state election, representing Hillarys. Prior to her election, Collins taught politics and history at local High Schools, including Scotch College.

Previously, she contested the 2017 state election in then-Premier Colin Barnett's seat of Cottesloe.

She currently serves as the Parliamentary Secretary to Minister Paul Papalia, supporting him across the portfolios of Emergency Services, Corrective Services, Defence Industries, Veterans, and Racing and Gaming.

== Personal life ==
Born in Aberdeen, Scotland on 22 July 1988, Collins migrated to Australia, arriving in Victoria in 1992 and then moving to Perth, Western Australia in 1996. She graduated from the University of Notre Dame Australia in 2010 with a BA, majoring in history, politics and international relations. She lives in Padbury with her partner Jack, and their dog Lenny.

== Early career ==
Collins studied history, politics and international relations at Notre Dame in Fremantle then pursued a teaching qualification in order to share her passion for civics.

She has taught extensively in India, Colombia and Vietnam and completed a parliamentary internship in Ireland. In her inaugural speech, she raised the issues of climate action, youth mental health and the power of education.

== Political career ==
Collins was endorsed as Labor candidate for the seat of Hillarys in July 2020. In her election campaigns, she received mentoring from New South Wales politician, Rose Jackson, through EMILY's List Australia.

At the 2021 election Collins gained one of the largest swings in the entire state, 19.3% as was elected as the first Labor Member to Hillarys since Pamela Beggs held the predecessor seat of Whitfords from 1983-1993.

Collins is the 100th woman elected to the Western Australian Parliament being sworn in 100 years after the election of Edith Cowan, the first woman elected to any Parliament in Australia.

Collins was re-elected in the 2025 Western Australian state election.

=== Parliamentary appointments ===
Collins was appointed as a member of the Education and Health Standing Committee from 12 May 2021 and as an Acting Speaker of the Legislative Assembly from 11 May 2022 to 13 June 2023.

Collins was appointed as Secretary of the State Parliamentary Labor Party from 14 February 2023.

Collins was appointed as the Parliamentary Secretary to the Minister for Emergency Services; Corrective Services; Defence Industries; Veterans; Racing and Gaming from 19 March 2025.

== Election results ==
=== 2025 state election ===
2025 Western Australian state election: Hillarys
Party	Candidate	Votes	%	±%
Labor	Caitlin Collins	15,021	52.5	−8.7
Liberal	Lisa Olsson	9,825	34.3	+7.4
Greens	Nicholas D'Alonzo	2,733	9.6	+4.4
Christians	Dwight Randall	1,026	3.6	+3.4
Total formal votes		28,605	96.7	−0.2
Informal votes		977	3.3	+0.2
Turnout		29,582	89.0	+3.2
Two-party-preferred result
Labor	Caitlin Collins	17,201	60.1	−8.6
Liberal	Lisa Olsson	11,401	39.9	+8.6
Labor hold		Swing	−8.6	

=== 2021 state election ===
2021 Western Australian state election: Hillarys
Party	Candidate	Votes	%	±%
Labor	Caitlin Collins	15,671	61.4	+28.1
Liberal	Peter Katsambanis	6,900	27.0	−11.0
Greens	Greg Glazov	1,366	5.4	−3.9
Legalise Cannabis	Katrina Winfield	582	2.3	+2.3
No Mandatory Vaccination	W. Seeto	476	1.9	+1.9
Liberals for Climate	Rick Tylka	339	1.3	+1.3
WAxit	Zoran Jankulovski	184	0.7	+0.5
Total formal votes		25,518	97.0	+0.9
Informal votes		802	3.0	−0.9
Turnout		26,320	88.1	−0.3
Two-party-preferred result
Labor	Caitlin Collins	17,597	69.0	+19.3
Liberal	Peter Katsambanis	7,919	31.0	−19.3
Labor gain from Liberal		Swing	+19.3	

=== 2017 state election ===
2017 Western Australian state election: Cottesloe
Party	Candidate	Votes	%	±%
Liberal	Colin Barnett	13,264	56.7	−8.1
Labor	Caitlin Collins	5,280	22.6	+10.4
Greens	Greg Boland	2,826	12.1	+1.8
Independent	Alida Lancee	1,332	5.7	+5.7
Christians	Riaan Groenewald	226	1.0	−0.3
Micro Business	Nicole Poppas	198	0.8	+0.8
	Michael Watson	176	0.8	+0.8
Independent	Dmitry Malov	103	0.4	+0.4
Total formal votes		23,405	96.6	+0.1
Informal votes		819	3.4	−0.1
Turnout		24,224	88.4	+0.1
Two-party-preferred result
Liberal	Colin Barnett	14,799	63.3	−7.8
Labor	Caitlin Collins	8,590	36.7	+7.8
Liberal hold		Swing	−7.8	

Western Australian Legislative Assembly
Preceded by Peter Katsambanis	Member for Hillarys; 2021–present	Incumbent
