= Paul Lilburne =

Western Australian politician

Member of the Western Australian Legislative Assembly for Carine
- In office 13 March 2021 – 8 March 2025
- Preceded by: Tony Krsticevic
- Succeeded by: Liam Staltari

Personal details
- Born: 11 February 1973 (age 53) Perth, Western Australia
- Party: Labor

Paul Robert Lilburne (born 11 February 1973) is an Australian politician from the Labor Party. He was elected a member of the Western Australian Legislative Assembly for the electoral district of Carine at the 2021 Western Australian state election, and was defeated by Liberal candidate Liam Staltari at the 2025 election.

Western Australian Legislative Assembly
Preceded by Tony Krsticevic	Member for Carine; 2021–2025	Succeeded by Liam Staltari
