= Electoral district of Hillarys =

State elecrtoral district in Western Australia

Hillarys Western Australia—Legislative Assembly
- Interactive map of electoral district boundaries from the 2025 state election
- State: Western Australia
- Dates current: 1996–present
- MP: Caitlin Collins
- Party: Labor
- Namesake: Hillarys
- Electors: 33,245 (2025)
- Area: 25 km^{2} (9.7 sq mi)
- Demographic: Metropolitan
- Coordinates: 31.78°S 115.75°E
Electorates around Hillarys:
Indian Ocean	Joondalup	Joondalup
Indian Ocean	Hillarys	Kingsley
Indian Ocean	Carine	Carine

Hillarys is an electoral district of the Legislative Assembly in the Australian state of Western Australia.

The district is based in Perth's northern suburbs. Politically, it is typically a safe Liberal seat but Caitlin Collins won it for the Labor Party for the first time at the 2021 election.

== Geography ==
Hillarys is an outer northern suburban seat in Perth. It is bounded to the north by Ocean Reef Road, to the east by the Mitchell Freeway, to the west by the Indian Ocean and to the south by Hepburn Avenue. The district includes the suburbs of Hillarys, Padbury, Kallaroo, Mullaloo, Beldon and Craigie.

== History ==
The district was first contested at the 1996 state election, essentially replacing the seat of Whitford. It was held by Liberal MP Rob Johnson from its creation until his 2017 defeat, after resigning from the party to sit as an independent. The district boundaries were redistributed in 2019 and saw the suburb of Sorrento being removed while the suburbs of Beldon and Mullaloo added.

== Members for Hillarys ==
Member	Party	Term
Rob Johnson	Liberal	1996–2016
Rob Johnson	Independent	2016–2017
Peter Katsambanis	Liberal	2017–2021
Caitlin Collins	Labor	2021–present

== Election results ==
2025 Western Australian state election: Hillarys
Party	Candidate	Votes	%	±%
Labor	Caitlin Collins	15,021	52.5	−8.7
Liberal	Lisa Olsson	9,825	34.3	+7.4
Greens	Nicholas D'Alonzo	2,733	9.6	+4.4
Christians	Dwight Randall	1,026	3.6	+3.4
Total formal votes		28,605	96.7	−0.2
Informal votes		977	3.3	+0.2
Turnout		29,582	89.0	+3.2
Two-party-preferred result
Labor	Caitlin Collins	17,201	60.1	−8.6
Liberal	Lisa Olsson	11,401	39.9	+8.6
Labor hold		Swing	−8.6	
