= Tony Krsticevic =

Australian politician

Member of the Western Australian Parliament for Carine
- In office 6 September 2008 – 13 March 2021
- Preceded by: Katie Hodson-Thomas
- Succeeded by: Paul Lilburne

Personal details
- Born: Antonio Krstičević; 13 June 1966 (age 59) Zagreb, Croatia
- Party: Liberal
- Profession: Business
- Krsticevic's voice recorded September 2018

Antonio (Tony) Krsticevic /ˈkrɪstəvɪtʃ/ (born 13 June 1966) is an Australian politician who served as the member for Carine in the Western Australian Legislative Assembly from the 2008 election to the 2021 election. He is a member of the Liberal Party.

Born in Zagreb, Croatia, Krsticevic emigrated to Australia at the age of three with his family a few years after his father established himself, and became a citizen at age 10. After completing a Bachelor of Business with majors in Accounting and Computing, he worked for 20 years at the Australian Taxation Office in Perth. He also served on the Ethnic Communities Council's management committee and was a founding member and the first chair of the Croatian Community Council, as well as coaching the local junior soccer team in Balcatta.

He joined the Liberal Party in 1995. In 2008, he was asked to nominate Carine after the incumbent member, Katie Hodson-Thomas, announced her retirement.

His parliamentary maiden speech referred to his Catholic beliefs and was identified by Amanda O'Brien of the Australian newspaper as part of a four-member "god squad" in WA politics.

Following the 2017 election defeat of the Barnett Government, he emerged as a contender to lead the parliamentary Liberal Party from opposition.

He was voted out at the 2021 state election with a 12.7% swing against him, being replaced by Labor's Paul Lilburne. Before that election, Carine was considered a safe Liberal seat and very unlikely to go to Labor.

In October 2021, Krsticevic was elected to a four-year term on the Coastal Ward of the City of Stirling council.

Western Australian Legislative Assembly
Preceded by Katie Hodson-Thomas	Member for Carine; 2008–2021	Succeeded by Paul Lilburne
