= Peter Katsambanis =

Australian politician (1965–2026)

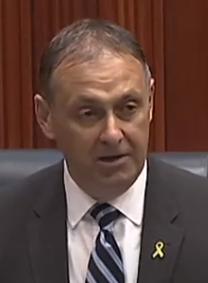
- Katsambanis in 2020

Member of the Victorian Legislative Council for Monash Province
- In office 30 March 1996 – 27 November 2002

Member of the Western Australian Legislative Council for North Metropolitan
- In office 22 May 2013 – 6 February 2017
- Succeeded by: Elise Irwin

Member of the Western Australian Legislative Assembly for Hillarys
- In office 11 March 2017 – 13 March 2021
- Preceded by: Rob Johnson
- Succeeded by: Caitlin Collins

Personal details
- Born: Peter Argyris Katsambanis; 24 December 1965 Melbourne, Victoria, Australia
- Died: 5 September 2026 (aged 60) Melbourne, Victoria, Australia
- Party: Liberal
- Spouse: Karalee Katsambanis
- Children: 5
- Education: University of Melbourne
- Occupation: Politician
- Profession: Solicitor

Peter Argyris Katsambanis (24 December 1965 – 5 September 2026) was an Australian politician. He was elected to the Western Australian Legislative Council at the 2013 state election, representing the Liberal Party, taking his seat on 22 May 2013. He resigned in 2017 to successfully contest the Legislative Assembly seat of Hillarys. At the 2021 Western Australian state election, he was defeated by Labor's Caitlin Collins. He had previously been a Liberal member of the Victorian Legislative Council, from 1996 to 2002.

== Early life ==
Katsambanis was born in Melbourne on 24 December 1965, to Argyrios and Nicoletta Katsambanis. He attended Windsor Public School, Prahran High School and Melbourne High School, graduating in 1983. Katsambanis received a Bachelor of Commerce (1989) and a Bachelor of Law (1990) from the University of Melbourne before becoming an articled clerk with the Trust Company of Australia.

== Career ==
In 1992, he became senior trust officer for ANZ funds management and, in 1994, became a solicitor with Perpetual Trustees. In 1995, he founded his own legal firm.

=== Politics ===
A member of the Liberal Party from 1987, he was president of the Toorak Young Liberals (1990–91). From 1991 to 1992, he was on the Prahran Electorate Council.

In 1996, Katsambanis was elected to the Victorian Legislative Council as one of the members for Monash Province. He served as a backbencher until his defeat in 2002.

Katsambanis was married twice. His second wife was former Seven News Melbourne reporter Karalee Tilvern. In 2010 they moved to Western Australia where Tilvern was born and educated. At the 2013 state election, Katsambanis was elected to the Western Australian Legislative Council, his term commencing on 22 May 2013.

In 2016, following Rob Johnson's resignation from the Liberal Party to sit as an independent, a preselection was held for the safe Liberal seat of Hillarys, contested by Katsambanis and businessman Simon Ehrenfeld. Ehrenfeld won, but the WA Liberal Party's state council ultimately overturned the initial preselection result and named Katsambanis as the Liberal candidate for the seat. Katsambanis went on to defeat Johnson and the WA Labor candidate and former councillor, Teresa Ritchie, in the 2017 state election, achieving 39.63% of the primary vote and 54.09% of the two-party-preferred vote. However, that election saw his party lose power to Labor after over eight years in government.

He was the subject of nationwide media attention after Johnson released a curious 2:49 am voicemail left on his phone by Katsambanis: "Have a great day. Enjoy the rest of your life. Thank you. Bye bye." Katsambanis denied being drunk at the time.

After the election, Katsambanis was appointed by new Liberal leader Mike Nahan as the Shadow Minister for Police, Road Safety, Corrective Services and Industrial Relations.

In 2017, Katsambanis' electoral office moved to a first-floor office at Hillarys Boat Harbour which lacked disabled access. Former federal MHR and wheelchair-using Vietnam War veteran Graham Edwards complained to the premier but the office allocation remained for the present.

Katsambanis lost the seat of Hillarys when he was defeated by Labor's Caitlin Collins at the 2021 state election. His 2021 loss marked the second time he was voted out of office, the first being his defeat in the 2002 Victorian state election. In response to the 2021 election result, Katsambanis told Perth's 6PR radio "I am done in politics. I walk away and I hold my head up high."

== Death ==
Katsambanis died on 5 September 2026, at the age of 60. He was under the care of the heart transplantation team of The Alfred Hospital in Melbourne at the time.

Western Australian Legislative Assembly
Preceded by Rob Johnson	Member for Hillarys; 2017–2021	Succeeded by Caitlin Collins
