= Liam Staltari =

Western Australian politician

Liam Staltari MLA
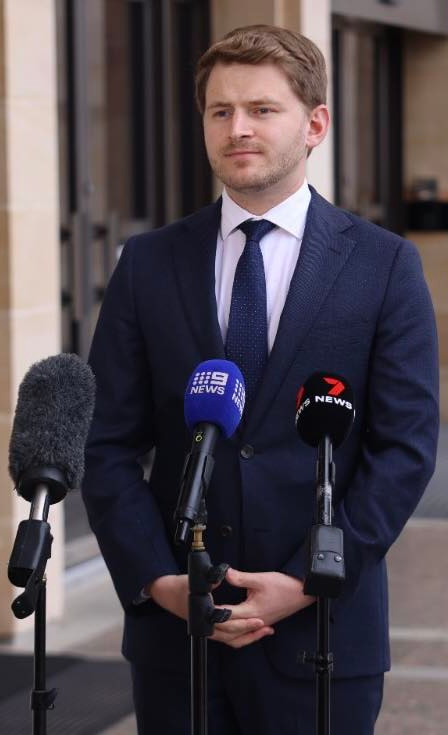

Member of the Western Australian Legislative Assembly for Carine
- Incumbent
- Assumed office 8 March 2025
- Preceded by: Paul Lilburne

Personal details
- Born: 1996 (age 29–30)
- Party: Liberal
- Education: Mazenod College
- Website: www.liamstaltari.com.au

Liam Staltari (born 1996) is an Australian politician from the Liberal Party who is member of the Western Australian Legislative Assembly for the electoral district of Carine. He won his seat at the 2025 Western Australian state election. Prior to entering Parliament Staltari previously worked in the mining industry. He was an unsuccessful candidate in Kalamunda in 2021.

He is a graduate of The University of Western Australia and was involved with the Student Guild. He was federal president of the Young Liberals from 2019 to 2020.

He was appointed Shadow Minister for Education, Early Childhood, Disability Services and Heritage by Basil Zempilas.

Western Australian Legislative Assembly
Preceded by Paul Lilburne	Member for Carine; 2025–present	Incumbent
