= Electoral district of Carine =

State electoral district of Perth, Western Australia

Carine Western Australia—Legislative Assembly
- Interactive map of electoral district boundaries from the 2025 state election
- State: Western Australia
- Dates current: 1996–present
- MP: Liam Staltari
- Party: Liberal
- Namesake: Carine
- Electors: 32,608 (2025)
- Area: 24 km^{2} (9.3 sq mi)
- Demographic: Metropolitan
- Coordinates: 31.84°S 115.77°E
Electorates around Carine:
| Hillarys | Hillarys | Kingsley |
| Indian Ocean | Carine | Kingsley |
| Indian Ocean | Scarborough | Balcatta |

Carine is an electoral district of the Legislative Assembly in the Australian state of Western Australia.

The district is based in Perth's northern suburbs. Politically, it has generally been a safe Liberal seat but Paul Lilburne won it for the Labor Party for the first time at the 2021 election. He was easily defeated in 2025 by Liam Staltari of the Liberal Party.

== Geography ==
Carine is a beachside electorate located in Perth's northern suburbs. It is bounded to the east by the Mitchell Freeway, to the south by North Beach Road, Karrinyup Road and Reid Highway and to the west by the Indian Ocean. Its northern boundary consists of Hepburn Avenue. The districts includes the suburbs of Carine, Watermans Bay, Sorrento, Duncraig, Marmion and Karrinyup.

== History ==
Carine was first created for the 1996 state election. It largely replaced the abolished district of Marmion.

The district boundaries were redistributed in 2019 and saw the suburbs of North Beach and Gwelup being removed while the suburb of Sorrento was added.

== Members for Carine ==
| Member | Party | Term |
|---|---|---|
| Katie Hodson-Thomas | Liberal | 1996–2008 |
| Tony Krsticevic | Liberal | 2008–2021 |
| Paul Lilburne | Labor | 2021–2025 |
| Liam Staltari | Liberal | 2025–present |

== Election results ==
2025 Western Australian state election: Carine
| Party | Candidate | Votes | % | ±% |
|---|---|---|---|---|
| Liberal | Liam Staltari | 15,027 | 52.1 | +9.1 |
| Labor | Paul Lilburne | 9,096 | 31.5 | −14.5 |
| Greens | Lisa Hindmarsh | 3,805 | 13.2 | +5.0 |
| Christians | Sallyann Bone | 927 | 3.2 | +3.2 |
| Total formal votes | | 28,855 | 97.0 | −0.1 |
| Informal votes | | 892 | 3.0 | +0.1 |
| Turnout | | 29,747 | 91.2 | +1.6 |
Two-party-preferred result
| Liberal | Liam Staltari | 16,608 | 57.6 | +11.4 |
| Labor | Paul Lilburne | 12,244 | 42.4 | −11.4 |
| Liberal gain from Labor | | Swing | +11.4 | |
