= No Mandatory Vaccination Party =

- Leader: Cameron Tinley
- Headquarters: 2 Roseberry Avenue, South Perth WA 6151
- Ideology: Vaccine hesitancy

Website
- nomandatoryvaccinationparty.com.au

The No Mandatory Vaccination Party is a political party formerly registered in the Australian state of Western Australia.

== History ==
The No Mandatory Vaccination Party was registered in January 2021 in preparation for the 2021 Western Australian state election. Cameron Tinley, the party's founder, had previously been fired from his job as a teacher at Atwell College for his refusal to get vaccinated for COVID-19. The party won no seats at the election, but was a part of a small party alliance that used group voting tickets to get each other elected, resulting in the election of the Legalise Cannabis and Daylight Saving parties to the state's Legislative Council despite neither party earning more than 2% of the vote. The No Mandatory Vaccination Party themselves almost won a seat in the South Metropolitan Region, despite earning only 0.94% of the primary vote; they were only defeated due to the state Liberal Party preferencing the Greens over any of the 19 smaller parties part of the alliance.

In 2022, the party was de-registered due to a swathe of fake applications having inflated the party's members past the required 1500 members needed to be recognised by the federal government, with many of the fake applications originating from private school students aiming to troll the party. Tinley claimed that the party had "close to 3000" members before being audited by the government, and later that the party's website had been hacked resulting in the loss of the details of hundreds of members. The failure to acquire enough members before the registration deadline led to the party's members running nameless at the 2022 federal election.

== Members ==
The only two known members of the party are founder Cameron Tinley and Tricia Ayre, who are listed as a high school teacher and primary school teacher respectively. They both ran for seats representing Western Australia in the Senate at the 2022 federal election. The party initially planned to contest every Senate seat and Lower House electorate, but found their potential candidates instead choosing to join the United Australia Party.

== Policies ==
The policies of the party exclusively concern Western Australian laws surrounding the administration of vaccines. Their site lists their policies as the following:

- Repealing Section 158 of the state's Public Health Act 2016
- Making it illegal for businesses or companies to require employees to receive vaccination
- Removing compulsory vaccination requirements for children to attend school
- Reintroducing the right to exercise conscientious objection to vaccinations

Tinley has stated that despite his party's policies being in line with that of anti-vaccination movements, not all members and candidates are anti-vaccine, and that the party was “not restricting our candidates from being vaccinated."
