= Candidates of the 1993 Western Australian state election =

The 1993 Western Australian state election was held on 6 February 1993.

== Retiring Members ==
=== Labor ===
- Bob Pearce MLA (Armadale)
- Gavan Troy MLA (Swan Hills)
- Joe Berinson MLC (North Metropolitan)
- Beryl Jones MLC (South West)
- Fred McKenzie MLC (East Metropolitan)

=== Liberal ===
- Bill Grayden MLA (South Perth)
- Barry MacKinnon MLA (Jandakot)
- Leon Watt MLA (Albany)
- Diane Airey MLC (South Metropolitan)
- Margaret McAleer MLC (Agricultural)
- David Wordsworth MLC (Agricultural)

=== National ===
- John Caldwell MLC (Agricultural)

=== Independent ===
- Ian Alexander MLA (Perth) – elected as Labor
- Frank Donovan MLA (Morley) – elected as Labor
- Ian Thompson MLA (Darling Range) – elected as Liberal

== Legislative Assembly ==
Sitting members are shown in bold text. Successful candidates are highlighted in the relevant colour. Where there is possible confusion, an asterisk (*) is also used.

| Electorate | Held by | Labor candidate | Coalition candidate | Democrats candidate | Greens candidate | Other candidates |
|---|---|---|---|---|---|---|
| Albany | Liberal | Ursula Richards | Malcolm Cameron (Nat); Kevin Prince* (Lib) | Roland Paver | | Robert Howard (Ind); Drew Posthuma (Ind); Alf Sharp (CALM) |
| Applecross | Liberal | Maryla Rowcroft | **Richard Lewis** (Lib) | Anne Millar | | |
| Armadale | Labor | Kay Hallahan | Maureen Healy (Lib) | Fred Miller | | William Higgins (Ind); Tammo Hoover (Ind); Zac Schonberg; Ivan Talbot (Ind); Kenneth Williamson (Ind) |
| Ashburton | Labor | **Fred Riebeling** | Joy West (Lib) | | Hugh Paterson | |
| Avon | National | Walerjan Sieczka | Bevan Henderson (Lib); **Max Trenorden*** (Nat) | | | Paul Maycock (Ind) |
| Balcatta | Labor | **Nick Catania** | Katie Hodson-Thomas (Lib) | Yvette Heath | Jack Geneff | |
| Belmont | Labor | **Eric Ripper** | Don Randall (Lib) | Kathleen Hill | John Riordan | Malcolm Meikle (Ind) |
| Bunbury | Labor | **Phil Smith** | Ian Osborne (Lib) | | Marilyn Palmer | Ronald Waldron (Ind) |
| Cockburn | Labor | **Bill Thomas** | Janette McTaggart (Lib) | Lynda Somers | Margaret-Mary Jenkins | |
| Collie | National | Mick Murray | Harald Peterson (Lib); **Hilda Turnbull*** (Nat) | Sandra Churches | | Alfred Bussell (Ind); Adrianus Hladio (Ind) |
| Cottesloe | Liberal | James Wearne | **Colin Barnett** (Lib) | Michael Barrett | Giz Watson | |
| Darling Range | Liberal | James Christie | John Day (Lib) | Peter Lambert | Janet Taciak | Maura Howlett (Ind); Peter Marjoram (Ind); Wiebe Tielman (Ind) |
| Dianella | Labor | **Keith Wilson** | Kim Hames (Lib) | Stewart Godden | Edwin Speed | Marguerite Henshaw (Ind) |
| Eyre | Labor | **Julian Grill** | Stephen Sprigg (Lib) | | | Darrall Renton (Ind) |
| Floreat | Independent | | Douglas Jecks (Lib) | Noreen O'Connor | Geoffrey Dodson | **Liz Constable** (Ind) |
| Fremantle | Labor | **Jim McGinty** | Phillip Storey (Lib) | Kevin Allen | Katherine Anketell | Donald De San Miguel; Clarrie Isaacs (Ind); Patrick Mullins (Ind); Fred Rieben (Ind); Anthony Seman (Ind); Geoffrey Spencer (DSEL) |
| Geraldton | Liberal | Gary Evershed | **Bob Bloffwitch*** (Lib); Malcolm Short (Nat) | | | William Tomson (Ind) |
| Glendalough | Labor | **Carmen Lawrence** | Michael Saunders (Lib) | Helen Hodgson | Stewart Jackson | Scott Calnan (Ind); Barbara Campbell (Ind); Karen Zielinski (Ind) |
| Greenough | Liberal | John Beenham | Glenys McDonald (Nat); **Kevin Minson*** (Lib) | | | |
| Helena | Labor | **Gordon Hill** | Rhonda Parker (Lib) | | Christine Neal | Owen McGrath |
| Jandakot | Liberal | Dermot Buckley | Mike Board (Lib) | David Banner | | |
| Kalgoorlie | Labor | **Ian Taylor** | Gary Boyle (Lib) | | | Margaret Jones (Ind) |
| Kenwick | Labor | **Judyth Watson** | Leslie McMahon (Lib) | Valma Preston | Jacqueline Robinson | Paul Augustson (Ind); Jean Jeans (Ind) |
| Kimberley | Labor | **Ernie Bridge** | Dale Vaughan (Lib) | | | |
| Kingsley | Liberal | John Elkin | **Cheryl Edwardes** (Lib) | Warren Bishop | Willem Franssen | |
| Mandurah | Liberal | David Templeman | **Roger Nicholls** (Lib) | | Andrea Evans | Norman Dicks (Ind); Clive Hart (Ind); Neville Hawtin (Ind); Julia Shewring (Ind) |
| Marangaroo | Labor | **Ted Cunningham** | Avis Gobby (Lib) | | Otto Dik | Ronald Bowman (Ind); William Francis (Ind) |
| Marmion | Liberal | Kirk Stergiou | **Jim Clarko** (Lib) | Elizabeth Brown | Vivienne Elanta | |
| Maylands | Labor | **Judy Edwards** | Gary Lilleyman (Lib) | Rosslyn Tilbury | Robert Paton | Noel Sharp (Ind) |
| Melville | Liberal | William Lyon | **Doug Shave** (Lib) | Ann Curtis | Valerie Cousins | Margaret Barton (Ind); Anthony Buhagiar (Ind); Shirley de la Hunty (Ind); Michael McKibbin (Ind) |
| Merredin | National | Susanne Chance | Jos Chatfield (Lib); **Hendy Cowan*** (Nat) | | | |
| Mitchell | Labor | **David Smith** | Kerrol Gildersleeve (Lib) | Bernard Noonan | Jill Reading | Ronald Cook (Ind); John Sibson (Ind) |
| Moore | Liberal | Colin Meredith | Dexter Davies (Nat); **Bill McNee*** (Lib) | | | |
| Morley | Labor | Clive Brown | John Horobin (Lib) | | | Karry-Lea Smith (Ind) |
| Murray | Labor | **Keith Read** | Frank Letchford (Nat); Arthur Marshall* (Lib) | Susan Ishmael | | Kim Blacklock (Ind); Theo Kearing (Ind); Laurence Preston (Ind); Wayne Whitcroft (Ind) |
| Nedlands | Liberal | William Harman | **Richard Court** (Lib) | Fraser Pope | Elisabeth Jones | |
| Nollamara | Labor | **John Kobelke** | John Babbage (Lib) | | Lucy Honan | Neil Watson (Ind) |
| Northern Rivers | Labor | **Kevin Leahy** | Paquita Boston (Nat); Dudley Maslen (Lib) | Jill Bond | Lorraine Hatchwell | Nabil Rowland (Ind) |
| Peel | Labor | **Norm Marlborough** | Margaret McMurdo (Lib) | Huw Grossmith | Jeff Anderton | |
| Perth | Labor | Diana Warnock | Hal Colebatch (Lib) | | Penelope Robinson | Life Addvalue (Ind); Christopher Bignell (Ind); Michelle Hovane (DSEL); Kathleen Mallott (Ind); Alexander Manfrin (-) |
| Pilbara | Labor | **Larry Graham** | Pamela Walsh (Lib) | Glenis Cooper | David Flynn | Allan Hutcheson (Ind); Karen Merrin (Ind); Rodney Tregonning (Ind) |
| Riverton | Liberal | Dean Ellis | **Graham Kierath** (Lib) | Donald Bryant | Sally Boteler | |
| Rockingham | Labor | **Mike Barnett** | Kathleen Harste (Lib) | John Anderson | Barbara Gilchrist | Arthur Galletly (Ind); Allan Hill (Ind); Laurie Smith (Ind) |
| Roe | National | Rosemary Braybrook | **Ross Ainsworth*** (Nat); Allan Matthews (Lib) | | | Roderick Rogers (Ind) |
| Roleystone | Liberal | Michael Duxbury | **Fred Tubby** (Lib) | Raymond Tilbury | | Michael Devereux (Ind); Karen Nielsen (Ind) |
| Scarborough | Liberal | Robyn Murphy | **George Strickland** (Lib) | Gaenor Cranch | Robert Tait | Dean Economou (Ind) |
| South Perth | Liberal | | Phillip Pendal (Lib) | Gordon Edwards | Troy Ellis | Jim Grayden (Ind); Isobel (Ind); Brett Miller (Ind) |
| Stirling | National | Anthony Hughes | James Barrow (Lib); **Monty House*** (Nat) | Maurice Deane | Pamela Rumble | William North (CALM) |
| Swan Hills | Labor | Clyde Bevan | James Lee (Nat); June van de Klashorst* (Lib) | Kingsley Dunstan | Philip Bourgault Du Coudray | Kevin Oliver (Ind); Diane Parker (Ind) |
| Thornlie | Labor | **Yvonne Henderson** | Monica Holmes (Lib) | Gordon Stapp | | Joseph Isherwood (Ind) |
| Vasse | Liberal | Leslie Longwood | **Barry Blaikie*** (Lib); Coralie Tarbotton (Nat) | | David Swainston | |
| Victoria Park | Labor | **Geoff Gallop** | Betsy Kennish (Lib) | Daniel Bagster | Andrew Thomson | Ian Tracy (Ind) |
| Wagin | National | | Kelly Newton-Wordsworth (Lib); **Bob Wiese*** (Nat) | | | |
| Wanneroo | Labor | **Jackie Watkins** | Wayde Smith (Lib) | Bronwyn Jones | Stephen Magyar | Terry Bolden (Ind); William Duffy (Ind); Ronald Holt (CtA); Michael O'Brien (Ind); Ronald Palmer (Ind) |
| Warren | Liberal | Keith Lillie | **Paul Omodei** (Lib) | | Peter Akerman | |
| Wellington | Liberal | Marilyn Elson | **John Bradshaw** (Lib) | Bernard Noonan | Judyth Salom | |
| Whitford | Labor | **Pam Beggs** | Rob Johnson (Lib) | Geoffrey Curtis | Miguel Castillo | Jannifer Pearce (Ind); Norma Rundle (Ind) |

== Legislative Council ==
Sitting members are shown in bold text. Tickets that elected at least one MLC are highlighted in the relevant colour. Successful candidates are identified by an asterisk (*).

=== Agricultural ===
Five seats were up for election. The Labor Party was defending one seat. The Liberal Party was defending two seats. The National Party was defending two seats.

| Labor candidates | Liberal candidates | National candidates | Democrats candidates | Greens candidates | Grey Power candidates |
|---|---|---|---|---|---|
| 1. **Kim Chance***; 2. John Mason; 3. Dianne Spowart; 4. John Czuzman | 1. Bruce Donaldson*; 2. Murray Nixon*; 3. Peter Lee; 4. Steve Boylan; 5. Fran Weller | 1. **Eric Charlton***; 2. Murray Criddle*; 3. Dascia Weckert; 4. Geoff Gill | 1. Terrence Cheetham; 2. Lindsay Olman; 3. Robert Endersbee | 1. Pete Christiansen; 2. John Phillips | 1. Salli Vaughan |

=== East Metropolitan ===
Five seats were up for election. The Labor Party was defending three seats. The Liberal Party was defending two seats.

| Labor candidates | Liberal candidates | National candidates | Democrats candidates | Greens candidates | Ungrouped candidates |
|---|---|---|---|---|---|
| 1. Alannah MacTiernan*; 2. **Tom Butler***; 3. Nick Griffiths*; 4. Michelle Roberts; 5. **Valma Ferguson**; 6. Paul Sulc | 1. **Peter Foss***; 2. **Derrick Tomlinson***; 3. Robert Van Straalen; 4. Nicholas Bruining | 1. Mark Forecast; 2. Otto Weber | 1. Brian Jenkins; 2. Jean Ritter | 1. Mark Schneider; 2. Lorraine Johnston | John Tucak (Ind); Arthur Robertson (Grey Power); Kevin Cloghan (Republican) |

=== Mining and Pastoral ===
Five seats were up for election. The Labor Party was defending three seats. The Liberal Party was defending two seats.

| Labor candidates | Liberal candidates | Democrats candidates | Greens candidates | Grey Power candidates |
|---|---|---|---|---|
| 1. **Tom Stephens***; 2. **Mark Nevill***; 3. **Tom Helm***; 4. Peter McKerrow; 5. Bob Couzens; 6. Paul Summers | 1. **Norman Moore***; 2. **Phil Lockyer***; 3. Sally Wilkinson; 4. Sandy McTaggart | 1. Vin Cooper; 2. Shyama Peebles | 1. Robin Chapple; 2. Keith Lockyer | 1. Don Gudgeon |

=== North Metropolitan ===
Seven seats were up for election. The Labor Party was defending three seats. The Liberal Party was defending four seats.

| Labor candidates | Liberal candidates | Democrats candidates | Greens candidates | Davies Group candidates | Ungrouped candidates |
|---|---|---|---|---|---|
| 1. **Graham Edwards***; 2. **Sam Piantadosi***; 3. John O'Connor; 4. Ed Dermer; 5. Victor Leonzini; 6. Robert McLoughlin | 1. **George Cash***; 2. **Bob Pike***; 3. **Max Evans***; 4. Ross Lightfoot*; 5. Iain MacLean; 6. Alan Carstairs | 1. Richard Jeffreys; 2. Sarah Gilfillan-Gray; 3. John Massam | 1. Brenda Roy; 2. Maria Catelli | 1. **Reg Davies***; 2. Adam Davies | Phil King (Grey Power); Eugene Hands (Republican) |

=== South Metropolitan ===
Five seats were up for election. The Labor Party was defending three seats. The Liberal Party was defending two seats.

| Labor candidates | Liberal candidates | Greens candidates | Democrats candidates | Call to Australia candidates | Hodge Group |
|---|---|---|---|---|---|
| 1. **John Halden***; 2. **Cheryl Davenport***; 3. **Garry Kelly**; 4. John Noonan; 5. Reg Gordon; 6. Tony Lovett | 1. **Clive Griffiths***; 2. **Barbara Scott***; 3. Simon O'Brien; 4. Lesley Vanstan; 5. Robert Carruthers | 1. Jim Scott*; 2. Alison de Garis | 1. Don Millar; 2. Marlon Hercock | 1. Gerard Goiran; 2. Beryl Rogers | 1. Barry Hodge; 2. Kim Hodge |
| Utting Group candidates | Ungrouped candidates | | | | |
| 1. Richard Utting; 2. Julie Dethridge | Michael Hutton (Grey Power); Laurie Humphreys (Ind); Geoffrey Taylor (Ind); Veema Munroe (Republican) | | | | |

=== South West ===
Seven seats were up for election. The Labor Party was defending three seats. The Liberal Party was defending three seats. The National Party was defending one seat.

| Labor candidates | Liberal candidates | National candidates | Democrats candidates | Greens candidates | Ungrouped candidates |
|---|---|---|---|---|---|
| 1. **Bob Thomas***; 2. John Cowdell*; 3. **Doug Wenn***; 4. Brian Procter; 5. Lois Anderson | 1. **Barry House***; 2. **Bill Stretch***; 3. **Muriel Patterson***; 4. John Silcock; 5. Ian Mabey; 6. Peter Giumelli; 7. Gabi Ghasseb | 1. **Murray Montgomery***; 2. David Pover; 3. Robert Teale | 1. David Churches; 2. Lila Ward | 1. Paul Davis; 2. Lyn Serventy | Trish Townsend (Ind); Sandy Lewis (Ind); Doug Ratcliffe (Grey Power); Robert Moir (CALM); Ted Stone (Ind); J J Amelia (Ind); Jane King (Republican) |

== See also ==
- Members of the Western Australian Legislative Assembly, 1989–1993
- Members of the Western Australian Legislative Assembly, 1993–1996
- Members of the Western Australian Legislative Council, 1989–1993
- Members of the Western Australian Legislative Council, 1993–1997
- 1993 Western Australian state election
