= Electoral results for the South West Region =

This is a list of electoral results for the South West Region in Western Australian state elections from the region's creation in 1989 until the present.

Legislation to abolish the region, along with all other Western Australian electoral regions, was passed in November 2021, with the 2025 state election to use a single state-wide electorate of 37 members.

== Election results ==
=== 2021 ===
2021 Western Australian state election: South West
Party	Candidate	Votes	%	±%
Quota		29,300		
Labor	1. Sally Talbot (elected 1); 2. Alannah MacTiernan (elected 3); 3. Jackie Jarvis (elected 4); 4. John Mondy; 5. Ben Dawkins; 6. Kylie Fitzgerald	114,713	55.93	+19.49
Liberal	1. Steve Thomas (elected 2); 2. Greg Stocks; 3. Anita Shortland; 4. Hayden Burbidge	37,736	18.40	−4.28
National	1. James Hayward (elected 6); 2. Louise Kingston; 3. Rod Pfeiffer	12,254	5.97	−6.06
Greens	1. Diane Evers; 2. Donald Clarke; 3. Jodie Moffat	12,220	5.96	−1.62
Shooters, Fishers, Farmers	1. Rick Mazza; 2. Russell McCarthy; 3. Ray Hull	5,178	2.52	−1.59
Legalise Cannabis	1. Sophia Moermond (elected 5); 2. Nicola Johnson	4,531	2.21	+2.21
One Nation	1. Colin Tincknell; 2. Paul Howard; 3. Michael Pelle	3,841	1.87	−8.76
Christians	1. Laurence Van der Plas; 2. Joan Albany	3,782	1.84	+0.15
No Mandatory Vaccination	1. Keith Bunton; 2. Elisabeth Bluntschli	2,504	1.22	+1.22
Liberal Democrats	1. Eli Bernstein; 2. David Fishlock	2,014	0.98	+0.03
Western Australia	1. Terri Sharp; 2. Joanne Munro	1,420	0.69	+0.55
Sustainable Australia	1. Daniel Minson; 2. Heather Scott	904	0.44	+0.44
WAxit	1. Chas Hopkins; 2. Malcolm Gilmour	810	0.39	+0.20
Animal Justice	1. Vicki Bailey; 2. Sarah Gould	798	0.39	−0.40
Health Australia	1. Justin Zwartkruis; 2. Hayley Green	493	0.24	+0.24
Great Australian	1. Nick Robinson; 2. Andy Gleeson	461	0.22	+0.22
Liberals for Climate	1. Mark Bentley; 2. Pieter Lottering	410	0.20	−0.23
Daylight Saving	1. Garry Spiers; 2. Lizabeth Taylor	283	0.14	−0.22
Independent	1. Yasmin Bartlett; 2. Karen Perttula	242	0.12	+0.12
Independent	Dave Schumacher	170	0.08	+0.08
Independent	1. George Seth; 2. Noel Avery	145	0.07	+0.07
Independent	1. John Banks; 2. Phillip Spencer	101	0.05	+0.05
Independent	Bob Burdett	89	0.04	+0.04
Total formal votes		205,099	97.92	+0.83
Informal votes		4,357	2.08	−0.83
Turnout		209,456	86.20	−1.00

=== 2017 ===
2017 Western Australian state election: South West
Party	Candidate	Votes	%	±%
Quota		27,727		
Labor	1. Sally Talbot (elected 1); 2. Adele Farina (elected 3); 3. John Mondy; 4. Barry Winmar; 5. Jessica Short	70,734	36.44	+5.91
Liberal	1. Steve Thomas (elected 2); 2. Wade De Campo; 3. Robyn McSweeney; 4. Tony Norment; 5. Heather Reid; 6. Douglas McLarty	44,014	22.68	−21.27
National	1. Colin Holt (elected 5); 2. Louise Kingston; 3. Bevan Eatts; 4. Kylie Kennaugh	23,360	12.04	+1.06
One Nation	1. Colin Tincknell (elected 4); 2. Cameron Bartkowski; 3. Sean Butler	20,636	10.63	+10.63
Greens	1. Diane Evers (elected 6); 2. Hsien Harper	14,705	7.58	−0.34
Shooters, Fishers, Farmers	1. Nigel Hallett; 2. Craig Carbone; 3. Ray Hull	7,994	4.12	+1.75
Christians	1. Greg Spaanderman; 2. Rachael Dowdell	3,292	1.70	+0.24
Liberal Democrats	1. Nathan Dyson; 2. Damian Coletta	1,849	0.95	+0.95
Family First	1. Linda Rose; 2. Dave Bolt	1,792	0.92	−0.60
Animal Justice	1. Alicia Sutton; 2. Eric Gobbert	1,541	0.79	+0.79
Flux the System!	1. Daithí Gleeson; 2. Mark Bentley	841	0.43	+0.43
Daylight Saving	1. Brett Tucker; 2. Janet Wilson	686	0.35	+0.35
Independent	1. Tim Hartley; 2. Julio Pieraldi	622	0.32	+0.32
Fluoride Free WA	1. Hayley Green; 2. John Vukovich	579	0.30	+0.30
Micro Business	1. Jeff Casson; 2. Devinder Chinna	373	0.19	+0.19
Independent	1. Eric Thern; 2. Katrina De Ruyck	291	0.15	+0.15
Matheson for WA	1. Stephen Phelan; 2. Blake Phelan	285	0.15	+0.15
Independent	Kyle Hammond	267	0.14	+0.14
Independent	John Higgins	155	0.08	+0.08
Independent	Zyggi Uchwal	72	0.04	+0.04
Total formal votes		194,088	97.29	+0.04
Informal votes		5,411	2.71	−0.04
Turnout		199,499	88.25	−2.41

=== 2013 ===
2013 Western Australian state election: South West
Party	Candidate	Votes	%	±%
Quota		24,134		
Liberal	1. Robyn McSweeney (elected 1); 2. Barry House (elected 3); 3. Nigel Hallett (elected 5); 4. Ian Morison; 5. Paul Fitzpatrick; 6. Michelle Steck	74,248	43.95	+4.54
Labor	1. Sally Talbot (elected 2); 2. Adele Farina (elected 4); 3. John Mondy; 4. Ian Bishop; 5. Aaron Dean; 6. Pearl Lim	51,576	30.53	−2.53
National	1. Colin Holt (elected 6); 2. Sam Harma; 3. Dudley Greathead	18,541	10.98	+0.21
Greens	1. Giz Watson; 2. Hsien Harper	13,374	7.92	−0.71
Shooters and Fishers	1. Daniel Strijk; 2. Mark Mazza	3,997	2.37	+2.37
Family First	1. Bev Custers; 2. David Bolt	2,577	1.53	−2.38
Christians	1. Justin Moseley; 2. Tim Schoof	2,453	1.45	−0.66
Independent	1. Nataporn Sri-Innop Ross; 2. Janet Grogan	1,205	0.71	+0.71
Independent	Don Hyland	960	0.57	+0.57
Total formal votes		168,931	97.25	−0.13
Informal votes		4,776	2.75	+0.13
Turnout		173,707	90.67	+2.22

=== 2008 ===
2008 Western Australian state election: South West
Party	Candidate	Votes	%	±%
Quota		17,908		
Liberal	1. Robyn McSweeney (elected 1); 2. Nigel Hallett (elected 3); 3. Barry House (elected 6); 4. Paul Fitzpatrick; 5. Dennis Wellington; 6. Ross Ryan	60,684	39.41	+0.3
Labor	1. Sally Talbot (elected 2); 2. Adele Farina (elected 4); 3. John Mondy; 4. Wendy Perdon; 5. Christopher Hossen; 6. Elizabeth Nedela	50,908	33.06	−4.4
National	1. Colin Holt (elected 5); 2. Patricia Hughes	16,592	10.77	+5.2
Greens	1. Paul Llewellyn; 2. Rae McPherson	13,285	8.63	+1.0
Family First	1. Dan Sullivan; 2. Linda Rose	6,024	3.91	+0.9
Christian Democrats	1. John Lewis; 2. Ray Moran	3,251	2.11	+0.4
One Nation	Brian Burns	995	0.65	−1.5
Independent	1. Elaine Green; 2. Terry O'Leary	881	0.57	+0.6
Daylight Savings	Kara Pascoe	626	0.41	+0.41
Independent	Filip Guglielmana	328	0.21	+0.2
New Country	Judy Pearce	220	0.14	−0.5
Citizens Electoral Council	1. Ian Tuffnell; 2. Allan Dilley	205	0.13	+0.1
Total formal votes		153,999	97.38	+0.7
Informal votes		4,150	2.62	−0.7
Turnout		158,149	88.45	−2.7

=== 2005 ===
2005 Western Australian state election: South West
Party	Candidate	Votes	%	±%
Quota		17,908		
Liberal	1. Barry House (elected 1); 2. Robyn McSweeney (elected 3); 3. Nigel Hallett (elected 5); 4. Ken Robinson; 5. Kerrol Gildersleeve; 6. Philippa Reid; 7. Narelle King	55,894	39.0	+3.6
Labor	1. Adele Farina (elected 2); 2. Sally Talbot (elected 4); 3. Matt Benson-Lidholm (elected 6); 4. Liam Costello; 5. Jullianne Slater; 6. Jasper Trendall	54,036	37.7	+7.0
Greens	1. Paul Llewellyn (elected 7); 2. Kingsley Gibson	10,842	7.6	−0.9
National	1. Steve Dilley; 2. Colin Holt	7,734	5.4	−0.8
Family First	1. Linda Rose; 2. Coleen Heine	4,330	3.0	+3.0
One Nation	1. Alan Giorgi; 2. Kenneth Waters	3,091	2.2	−12.0
Christian Democrats	1. Justin Moseley; 2. Kerry Watterson	2,375	1.7	+0.4
Independent	Ken Gunson	1,538	1.1	−0.1
Public Hospital Support Group	1. Ray Goodwin; 2. Val Goodwin	1,165	0.8	+0.8
New Country	1. Paddy Embry; 2. Frances Chester	936	0.7	+0.7
Democrats	1. Adam Welch; 2. John Partridge	770	0.5	−1.3
Liberals for Forests	1. June Bennett; 2. Judy Pryer	549	0.4	+0.4
Total formal votes		143,260	96.7	−0.7
Informal votes		4,849	3.3	+0.7
Turnout		148,109	91.1	−1.0

=== 2001 ===
2001 Western Australian state election: South West
Party	Candidate	Votes	%	±%
Quota		16,882		
Liberal	1. Barry House (elected 1); 2. Bill Stretch (elected 4); 3. Robyn McSweeney (elected 6); 4. John Silcock; 5. Nigel Hallett; 6. Robert Nicholson; 7. Craig Carbone	47,862	35.4	
Labor	1. John Cowdell (elected 2); 2. Adele Farina (elected 5); 3. Matt Benson-Lidholm; 4. Ursula Richards; 5. Patricia Creevey; 6. Garry Newman	41,516	30.7	+2.6
One Nation	1. Paddy Embry (elected 3); 2. Peter O'Reilly; 3. Judith South	19,152	14.2	+14.2
Greens	1. Chrissy Sharp (elected 7); 2. Basil Schur; 3. Judy Trembath	11,442	8.5	+1.0
National	1. Mal Cameron; 2. Steve Dilley; 3. Gordon Smith	8,339	6.2	
Democrats	1. Alf Denman; 2. Alison Wylie	2,361	1.7	−2.7
Christian Democrats	Justin Moseley	1,791	1.3	+1.3
Independent	Ken Gunson	1,633	1.2	+1.2
Curtin Labor Alliance	Terry Iturbide	640	0.5	+0.5
Seniors	Glen Wood	318	0.2	+0.2
Total formal votes		135,054	97.4	+0.4
Informal votes		3,618	2.6	−0.4
Turnout		138,672	92.1	+0.2

- The Liberal and National parties ran a joint ticket for South West in the 1996 election. The overall swing against the Coalition in the South West region was -10.8.

=== 1996 ===
1996 Western Australian state election: South West
Party	Candidate	Votes	%	±%
Quota		15,037		
Liberal/National Coalition	1. Barry House (elected 1); 2. Bill Stretch (elected 3); 3. Muriel Patterson (elected 5); 4. Murray Montgomery (elected 6); 5. John Silcock; 6. Robyn McSweeney; 7. Rick Beatty; 8. Pauline McLeod; 9. Steve Thomas; 10. Nigel Hallett	63,032	52.4	−1.4
Labor	1. Bob Thomas (elected 2); 2. John Cowdell (elected 4); 3. Lois Anderson; 4. Marilyn Elson; 5. Gary De Jager	33,766	28.1	−6.3
Greens	1. Chrissy Sharp (elected 7); 2. Basil Schur; 3. Len Howard	9,028	7.5	+2.4
Democrats	1. Malcolm McKercher; 2. Helen van Noort	5,325	4.4	+2.3
Australia First	J.J. Amelia	4,161	3.5	+3.5
Marijuana	Paul Roth	3,201	2.7	+2.7
Call to Australia	1. Justin Moseley; 2. Laurie Sugg	1,511	1.3	+1.3
Natural Law	1. Ian Sandwell; 2. Elspeth Clairs	271	0.2	+0.2
Total formal votes		120,295	97.0	−0.4
Informal votes		3,774	3.0	+0.4
Turnout		124,069	91.9	−3.1

=== 1993 ===
1993 Western Australian state election: South West
Party	Candidate	Votes	%	±%
Quota		13,721		
Liberal	1. Barry House (elected 1); 2. Bill Stretch (elected 3); 3. Muriel Patterson (elected 5); 4. John Silcock; 5. Ian Mabey; 6. Peter Giumelli; 7. Gabi Ghasseb	48,052	43.78	+1.79
Labor	1. Bob Thomas (elected 2); 2. John Cowdell (elected 4); 3. Doug Wenn (elected 6); 4. Brian Procter; 5. Lois Anderson	37,798	34.44	−3.07
National	1. Murray Montgomery (elected 7); 2. David Pover; 3. Robert Teale	10,980	10.00	+0.58
Greens	1. Paul Davis; 2. Lyn Serventy	5,633	5.13	+5.13
Independent	Trish Townsend	3,113	2.84	+2.84
Democrats	1. David Churches; 2. Lila Ward	2,290	2.09	−0.06
Independent	Sandy Lewis	628	0.57	+0.57
Grey Power	Doug Ratcliffe	367	0.33	−2.82
CALM Resistance Movement	Robert Moir	318	0.29	+0.29
Independent	Ted Stone	273	0.25	+0.25
Independent	J J Amelia	163	0.15	+0.15
Republican	Jane King	151	0.14	+0.14
Total formal votes		109,766	97.40	−0.16
Informal votes		2,930	2.60	+0.16
Turnout		112,696	94.98	

=== 1989 ===
1989 Western Australian state election: South West
Party	Candidate	Votes	%	±%
Quota		11,987		
Liberal	1. Barry House (elected 1); 2. Muriel Patterson (elected 3); 3. Bill Stretch (elected 5); 4. Adrian Fawcett; 5. Suzanne Carter; 6. Jonathan Youngs	40,268	41.99	
Labor	1. Doug Wenn (elected 2); 2. Beryl Jones (elected 4); 3. Bob Thomas (elected 6); 4. Josephine Lynch; 5. Dane Carroll	35,966	37.51	
National	1. Murray Montgomery (elected 7); 2. Terence House; 3. Jennifer Barrett	9,029	9.42	
Group D	1. Marie-Louise Duxbury; 2. Lynette Serventy	4,549	4.74	
Grey Power	Herbert Cattrall	3,024	3.15	
Democrats	1. David Churches; 2. Daphne Wallace	2,065	2.15	
Independent	Paul Roth	992	1.03	
Total formal votes		95,894	97.56	
Informal votes		2,394	2.44	
Turnout		98,288	92.83	
