= Results of the 1996 Western Australian state election (Legislative Council) =

Western Australian state election, 14 December 1996 Legislative Council
Enrolled voters	1,119,992				
Votes cast	1,009,592		Turnout	90.14%	–3.53%
Informal votes	30,430		Informal	3.01%	–0.73%
Summary of votes by party
Party	Primary votes	%	Swing	Seats	Change
Liberal (metropolitan)	313,953	32.06%	–2.59%	7	– 1
Liberal/National^{[1]}	140,933	14.39%	–0.24%		
Liberal (country)				7	± 0
National				3	± 0
Labor	323,886	33.08%	–3.74%	12	– 2
Democrats	64,461	6.58%	+3.57%	2	+ 2
Greens	54,336	5.55%	+0.39%	3	+ 2
Marijuana	24,373	2.49%	+2.49%	0	± 0
Call to Australia	6,675	0.68%	+0.41%	0	± 0
Australia First	5,856	0.60%	+0.60%	0	± 0
Natural Law	5,514	0.56%	+0.56%	0	± 0
Racism No!	1,939	0.20%	+0.20%	0	± 0
Independent	37,236	3.80%	–0.38%	0	– 1
Total	979,162			34	

This is a list of electoral region results for the Western Australian Legislative Council in the 1996 Western Australian state election.

== Results by electoral region ==
=== Agricultural ===
1996 Western Australian state election: Agricultural
Party	Candidate	Votes	%	±%
Quota		13,181		
Liberal/National Coalition	1. Bruce Donaldson (elected 1); 2. Eric Charlton (elected 3); 3. Murray Nixon (elected 4); 4. Murray Criddle (elected 5); 5. Fran Weller; 6. Dexter Davies; 7. Anthony Fels; 8. Barbara Morrell	54,179	68.5	−1.1
Labor	1. Kim Chance (elected 2); 2. Dale Piercey; 3. Debbie Helm	17,917	22.7	−1.2
Democrats	1. Lea Logie; 2. Geoff Taylor	5,252	6.6	+4.2
Natural Law	1. Gary Nelson; 2. Anne Leishman	1,733	2.2	+2.2
Total formal votes		79,081	96.7	−1.2
Informal votes		2,675	3.3	+1.2
Turnout		81,756	91.1	−3.4

=== East Metropolitan ===
1996 Western Australian state election: East Metropolitan
Party	Candidate	Votes	%	±%
Quota		36,549		
Liberal	1. Peter Foss (elected 1); 2. Derrick Tomlinson (elected 3); 3. Nick Bruining; 4. Kent Murphy; 5. Kristine McConnell	88,820	40.5	−1.5
Labor	1. Nick Griffiths (elected 2); 2. Ljiljanna Ravlich (elected 4); 3. Kate Doust; 4. Jane Saunders; 5. Brad George; 6. Paul Sulc	79,200	36.1	−10.1
Democrats	1. Norm Kelly (elected 5); 2. Julie Ward	14,808	6.8	+3.6
Greens	1. Rowena Skinner; 2. Wayne Dierden	11,852	5.4	+3.4
Independent	Graeme Harris	11,483	5.2	+5.2
Marijuana	Mark Schneider	7,128	3.3	+3.3
Call to Australia	1. Gerard Goiran; 2. Derk Gans	5,164	2.4	+2.4
Natural Law	1. Jody Nielsen; 2. Patti Roberts	835	0.4	+0.4
Total formal votes		219,290	96.7	−0.6
Informal votes		7,441	3.3	+0.6
Turnout		226,731	91.6	−2.6

=== Mining and Pastoral ===
1996 Western Australian state election: Mining and Pastoral
Party	Candidate	Votes	%	±%
Quota		8,707		
Labor	1. Tom Stephens (elected 1); 2. Mark Nevill (elected 3); 3. Tom Helm (elected 5); 4. Peter McKerrow; 5. Jon Ford; 6. Omega Porteous	25,070	48.0	−6.5
Liberal	1. Norman Moore (elected 2); 2. Greg Smith (elected 4); 3. Ken Baston; 4. Les Moss; 5. John Fawcett	18,635	35.7	−1.2
National	1. Dudley Maslen; 2. Maxine Cable; 3. Kevin Williams	5,087	9.7	+9.7
Democrats	1. Patti Turney; 2. Shaaron du Bignon	2,620	5.0	+2.4
Natural Law	1. Lesley Maher; 2. Jennifer Andrews	828	1.6	+1.6
Total formal votes		52,240	97.3	−0.2
Informal votes		1,440	2.7	+0.2
Turnout		53,680	78.6	−7.3

=== North Metropolitan ===
1996 Western Australian state election: North Metropolitan
Party	Candidate	Votes	%	±%
Quota		37,402		
Liberal	1. George Cash (elected 1); 2. Max Evans (elected 3); 3. Ross Lightfoot (elected 5); 4. Ray Halligan; 5. Cam Tinley; 6. Lesley Goudie; 7. Michael Sutherland	138,852	46.4	−6.1
Labor	1. Ed Dermer (elected 2); 2. Ken Travers (elected 4); 3. Mark Cuomo; 4. Nick Agocs; 5. Pauline O'Connor; 6. June Galea	92,471	30.9	+2.3
Democrats	1. Helen Hodgson (elected 6); 2. Stephen Crabbe	22,961	7.7	+3.8
Greens	1. Giz Watson (elected 7); 2. Robin Chapple	19,097	6.4	−1.3
Group E	1. Reg Davies; 2. Adam Davies	11,680	3.9	−2.2
Marijuana	1. Gordon Huntley; 2. Michael Solonec	8,674	2.9	+2.9
Group G	1. Chris Burke; 2. Joan Samuel	2,561	0.9	+0.9
Australia First	Fred Rieben	1,695	0.6	+0.6
Natural Law	1. George Kailis; 2. Elenora Kailis	1,224	0.4	+0.4
Total formal votes		299,215	97.1	+3.4
Informal votes		8,831	2.9	−3.4
Turnout		308,046	90.2	−3.8

=== South Metropolitan ===
1996 Western Australian state election: South Metropolitan
Party	Candidate	Votes	%	±%
Quota		34,841		
Liberal	1. Simon O'Brien (elected 1); 2. Barbara Scott (elected 3); 3. Peter Bacich; 4. Patricia Waghorn; 5. Anthony Jarvis	86,281	41.3	−3.8
Labor	1. John Halden (elected 2); 2. Cheryl Davenport (elected 4); 3. Geoff Donegan; 4. Graham Giffard; 5. Dermot Buckley; 6. Andy Fitzgerald	75,462	36.1	−4.2
Greens	1. Jim Scott (elected 5); 2. Mary Jenkins	14,359	6.9	+1.4
Democrats	1. Don Millar; 2. Shirley de la Hunty	13,495	6.5	+4.0
Group A	1. Huw Grossmith; 2. Mark Grossmith	8,251	3.9	+3.9
Marijuana	Alison de Garis	5,370	2.6	+2.6
Independent	Russell Aubrey	3,261	1.6	+1.6
Racism No!	1. Clarrie Isaacs; 2. Arun Pradhan	1,939	0.9	+0.9
Natural Law	1. Cindy Hollings; 2. David Norman	623	0.3	+0.3
Total formal votes		209,041	97.1	−0.1
Informal votes		6,269	2.9	+0.1
Turnout		215,310	90.4	−3.5

=== South West ===
1996 Western Australian state election: South West
Party	Candidate	Votes	%	±%
Quota		15,037		
Liberal/National Coalition	1. Barry House (elected 1); 2. Bill Stretch (elected 3); 3. Muriel Patterson (elected 5); 4. Murray Montgomery (elected 6); 5. John Silcock; 6. Robyn McSweeney; 7. Rick Beatty; 8. Pauline McLeod; 9. Steve Thomas; 10. Nigel Hallett	63,032	52.4	−1.4
Labor	1. Bob Thomas (elected 2); 2. John Cowdell (elected 4); 3. Lois Anderson; 4. Marilyn Elson; 5. Gary De Jager	33,766	28.1	−6.3
Greens	1. Chrissy Sharp (elected 7); 2. Basil Schur; 3. Len Howard	9,028	7.5	+2.4
Democrats	1. Malcolm McKercher; 2. Helen van Noort	5,325	4.4	+2.3
Australia First	J.J. Amelia	4,161	3.5	+3.5
Marijuana	Paul Roth	3,201	2.7	+2.7
Call to Australia	1. Justin Moseley; 2. Laurie Sugg	1,511	1.3	+1.3
Natural Law	1. Ian Sandwell; 2. Elspeth Clairs	271	0.2	+0.2
Total formal votes		120,295	97.0	−0.4
Informal votes		3,774	3.0	+0.4
Turnout		124,069	91.9	−3.1

== See also ==
- Results of the Western Australian state election, 1996 (Legislative Assembly A-L)
- Results of the Western Australian state election, 1996 (Legislative Assembly M-Z)
- 1996 Western Australian state election
- Candidates of the Western Australian state election, 1996
- Members of the Western Australian Legislative Council, 1997–2001
