= Candidates of the 1996 Western Australian state election =

The 1996 Western Australian state election was held on 14 December 1996.

== Retiring Members ==
=== Labor ===
- Mike Barnett MLA (Rockingham)
- Kay Hallahan MLA (Armadale)
- Yvonne Henderson MLA (Thornlie)
- David Smith MLA (Mitchell)
- Graham Edwards MLC (North Metropolitan)
- Valma Ferguson MLC (East Metropolitan)
- Doug Wenn MLC (South West)

=== Liberal ===
- Barry Blaikie MLA (Vasse)
- Jim Clarko MLA (Marmion)
- Richard Lewis MLA (Applecross)
- Wayde Smith MLA (Wanneroo)
- Clive Griffiths MLC (South Metropolitan)
- Phil Lockyer MLC (Mining and Pastoral)

== Legislative Assembly ==
Sitting members are shown in bold text. Successful candidates are highlighted in the relevant colour. Where there is possible confusion, an asterisk (*) is also used.

Electorate	Held by	Labor candidate	Coalition candidate	Democrats candidate	Greens candidate	Other candidates
Albany	Liberal	Matt Benson-Lidholm	**Kevin Prince** (Lib)			Rob Moir (CALM)
Alfred Cove	Liberal	Louise Pratt	**Doug Shave** (Lib)			Lyn Edwards (Ind); Penny Hearne (Ind)
Armadale	Labor	Alannah MacTiernan	Tony Andretta (Lib)	Raelene Watson		Spike Fokkema (Ind)
Avon	National	Paul Andrews	**Max Trenorden** (Nat)			Stephen Bluck (Ind)
Ballajura	Liberal	John D'Orazio	**Rhonda Parker** (Lib)	Jim Kerr	Heather Aquilina	Robert Farrell (Ind); Raymond Nelson (Ind); Dave Sayer (AMP)
Bassendean	Labor	**Clive Brown**	Shane Shenton (Lib)	Kathy Ready		
Belmont	Labor	**Eric Ripper**	Andrew Murfin (Lib)	Val Preston	Teresa Castillo	
Bunbury	Liberal	Barry Down	**Ian Osborne** (Lib)	Ronald Hellyer	Joan Jenkins	Mary Collins (Ind); Joanne Hill (Ind)
Burrup	Labor	**Fred Riebeling**	Paul Ausburn (Nat); Barry Haase (Lib)			
Carine	Liberal	Ros Harley	Katie Hodson-Thomas (Lib)		Catherine Goh	John Bombak (Ind); Peter Kyle (Ind)
Churchlands	Independent	Geoffrey Baker				**Liz Constable** (Ind)
Cockburn	Labor	**Bill Thomas**	Wendy Blake (Lib)	Jakica Zaknic	Nadine Lapthorne	
Collie	National	Mick Murray	**Hilda Turnbull** (Nat)			
Cottesloe	Liberal	Paul Cecchini	**Colin Barnett** (Lib)	Kim Meyer	Steve Walker	
Darling Range	Liberal	Geoff Stallard	**John Day** (Lib)	Gail Kelly	Stewart Jackson	
Dawesville	Liberal	John Hughes	**Arthur Marshall** (Lib)	Andrew Harrison		Alan Gent (Ind); Shelby Pearson (Ind)
Eyre	Labor	**Julian Grill**	Kathy Finlayson (Nat); Don Green (Lib)			
Fremantle	Labor	**Jim McGinty**	Michael Mallis (Lib)	Corey Watts	Elisabeth Jones	
Geraldton	Liberal	Laurie Graham	**Bob Bloffwitch** (Lib)	Stephan Gyorgy		Tony Cogan (Ind)
Girrawheen	Labor	**Ted Cunningham**	Avis Gobby (Lib)	Margaret Evans		
Greenough	Liberal	Carl Reynolds	**Kevin Minson** (Lib)			
Hillarys	Liberal	Tony O'Gorman	**Rob Johnson** (Lib)	Sylvia Smith		
Innaloo	Liberal	Anne Barrett	**George Strickland** (Lib)	Peter Markham	Merilyn Keillor	Paul Shann (AMP)
Joondalup	Liberal	Dianne Guise	Chris Baker (Lib)	Sarah Gilfillan	Steve Magyar	Peter Rowlands (APP); Leigh Smith (AMP)
Kalgoorlie	Labor	**Megan Anwyl**	Doug Daws (Nat); Karen McGay (Lib)			Darby Renton (Ind)
Kimberley	Labor		James O'Kenny (Nat); David Parker (Lib)			**Ernie Bridge*** (Ind); Brian Martin (Ind)
Kingsley	Liberal	Jon Davies	**Cheryl Edwardes** (Lib)	Bert Toonen		
Mandurah	Liberal	Kevin Holmes	**Roger Nicholls** (Lib)	Marjorie McKercher	Patricia Keddie	John Smith (Ind)
Maylands	Labor	**Judy Edwards**	Bev Brennan (Lib)	Pat Lim	Colin Speed	
Merredin	National	Mick Cole	**Hendy Cowan** (Nat)			
Midland	Labor	**Michelle Roberts**	Anne Fergusson-Stewart (Lib)	Michael Preston		
Mitchell	Labor	Melissa Parke	Peter Prowse (Nat); Dan Sullivan* (Lib)	Morgan Wilde	Peter Eckersley	
Moore	Liberal	Steve Kirby	**Bill McNee** (Lib)			
Murdoch	Liberal	Monica Fitz	**Mike Board** (Lib)		Graham Lapthorne	
Murray-Wellington	Liberal	Laurie Preston	**John Bradshaw** (Lib)	Les Taylor		Morris Bessant (AFP); Brian McCarthy (CEC)
Nedlands	Liberal	Neil Roberts	**Richard Court** (Lib)	Michael Barrett	Mark Lockett	Michael Parks (Ind)
Ningaloo	Labor	**Kevin Leahy**	Margaret Day (Nat); Rod Sweetman* (Lib)	Douglas Bearham	John Blinkhorn	
Nollamara	Labor	**John Kobelke**	Brad Waghorn (Lib)	Sean Roda		
Peel	Labor	**Norm Marlborough**	James O'Malley (Lib)	David Coombs	Paul Lewis	Bill Hall (Ind)
Perth	Labor	**Diana Warnock**	Janet Davidson (Lib)		Elena Jeffreys	Raymond Conder (Ind)
Pilbara	Labor	**Larry Graham**	Anne O'Donoghue (Nat); Domenick Palumbo (Lib)			
Riverton	Liberal	Jane van den Herik	**Graham Kierath** (Lib)	Eric Speed		Abraham Lynx (Ind); Margot Ross (Ind)
Rockingham	Labor	Mark McGowan	Rob Brown (Lib)	Barbara Edwards	Bob Goodale	Arthur Galletly (Ind); Mal McFetridge (-); Frans Schutte (-)
Roe	National	June Belton	**Ross Ainsworth** (Nat)			Lesley Parker (Ind); Lance Shearer (Ind)
Roleystone	Liberal	Tom Hoyer	**Fred Tubby** (Lib)	Tony Bloomer	Catherine Hall	
South Perth	Liberal	Kim Bryant	Peter Spencer (Lib)		Andrew Thomson	**Phillip Pendal** (Ind)
Southern River	Labor	**Judyth Watson**	Monica Holmes (Lib)	Celia Dines		Tim Dowsett (Ind); Michelle Shave (CTA)
Stirling	National	Barry Christy	**Monty House** (Nat)	Gaida Neggo	Paul Llewellyn	
Swan Hills	Liberal	Peter Murray	**June van de Klashorst** (Lib)	Bobbie Moxham	Kathryn Driver	David Gunnyon (ARP)
Thornlie	Labor	Sheila McHale	Brian Brand (Lib)	Charlton Bailey	Rebecca Byrne	
Vasse	Liberal	Linda Mullins	Bernie Masters* (Lib); Beryle Morgan (Nat)	Alf Denman		Ron Palmer (Ind); Mike Sully (Ind)
Victoria Park	Labor	**Geoff Gallop**	Bruce Stevenson (Lib)	Anne Millar	Phil Farren	John Collins (Ind)
Wagin	National	Phil Hogan	**Bob Wiese** (Nat)			Jean Robinson (CEC)
Wanneroo	Liberal	Liz Prime	Iain MacLean (Lib)	Jeanette Grieves	Miguel Castillo	
Warren-Blackwood	Liberal	Nicholas Oaks	**Paul Omodei** (Lib)	Sally Johnston		Tony Drake (CEC)
Willagee	Labor	Alan Carpenter	Tony Seman (Lib)	Ilse Trewin	Eddie Speed	
Yokine	Liberal	**Nick Catania**	**Kim Hames** (Lib)	Margot Clifford	Kim Herbert	Lucy Honan (AMP); Sam Piantadosi (Ind)

== Legislative Council ==
Sitting members are shown in bold text. Tickets that elected at least one MLC are highlighted in the relevant colour. Successful candidates are identified by an asterisk (*).

=== Agricultural ===
Five seats were up for election. The Labor Party was defending one seat. The Liberal Party was defending two seats. The National Party was defending two seats.

Labor candidates	Coalition candidates	Democrats candidates	Natural Law candidates
1. **Kim Chance***; 2. Dale Piercey; 3. Debbie Helm	1. **Bruce Donaldson*** (Lib); 2. **Eric Charlton*** (Nat); 3. **Murray Nixon*** (Lib); 4. **Murray Criddle*** (Nat); 5. Fran Weller (Lib); 6. Dexter Davies (Nat); 7. Anthony Fels (Lib); 8. Barbara Morrell (Nat)	1. Lea Logie; 2. Geoff Taylor	1. Gary Nelson; 2. Anne Leishman

=== East Metropolitan ===
Five seats were up for election. The Labor Party was defending three seats. The Liberal Party was defending two seats.

Labor candidates	Liberal candidates	Democrats candidates	Greens candidates	CTA candidates	Natural Law candidates	Ungrouped candidates
1. **Nick Griffiths***; 2. Ljiljanna Ravlich*; 3. Kate Doust; 4. Jane Saunders; 5. Brad George; 6. Paul Sulc	1. **Peter Foss***; 2. **Derrick Tomlinson***; 3. Nick Bruining; 4. Kent Murphy; 5. Kristine McConnell	1. Norm Kelly*; 2. Julie Ward	1. Rowena Skinner; 2. Wayne Dierden	1. Gerard Goiran; 2. Derk Gans	1. Jody Nielsen; 2. Patti Roberts	Graeme Harris (Ind); Mark Schneider (AMP)

=== Mining and Pastoral ===
Five seats were up for election. The Labor Party was defending three seats. The Liberal Party was defending two seats.

Labor candidates	Liberal candidates	National candidates	Democrats candidates	Natural Law candidates
1. **Tom Stephens***; 2. **Mark Nevill***; 3. **Tom Helm***; 4. Peter McKerrow; 5. Jon Ford; 6. Omega Porteous	1. **Norman Moore***; 2. Greg Smith*; 3. Ken Baston; 4. Les Moss; 5. John Fawcett	1. Dudley Maslen; 2. Maxine Cable; 3. Kevin Williams	1. Patti Turney; 2. Shaaron du Bignon	1. Lesley Maher; 2. Jennifer Andrews

=== North Metropolitan ===
Seven seats were up for election. The Labor Party was defending two seats. The Liberal Party was defending four seats. Independent MLC Reg Davies was defending one seat.

Labor candidates	Liberal candidates	Democrats candidates	Greens candidates	Natural Law candidates	Marijuana candidates
1. Ed Dermer*; 2. Ken Travers*; 3. Mark Cuomo; 4. Nick Agocs; 5. Pauline O'Connor; 6. June Galea	1. **George Cash***; 2. **Max Evans***; 3. **Ross Lightfoot***; 4. Ray Halligan; 5. Cam Tinley; 6. Lesley Goudie; 7. Michael Sutherland	1. Helen Hodgson*; 2. Stephen Crabbe	1. Giz Watson*; 2. Robin Chapple	1. George Kailis; 2. Elenora Kailis	1. Gordon Huntley; 2. Michael Solonec
Independent candidates		Ungrouped candidates			
1. **Reg Davies**; 2. Adam Davies	1. Chris Burke; 2. Joan Samuel	Fred Rieben (AFP)			

=== South Metropolitan ===
Five seats were up for election. The Labor Party was defending two seats. The Liberal Party was defending two seats. The Greens WA were defending one seat.

Labor candidates	Liberal candidates	Greens candidates	Democrats candidates	Natural Law candidates	Racism No! candidates
1. **John Halden***; 2. **Cheryl Davenport***; 3. Geoff Donegan; 4. Graham Giffard; 5. Dermot Buckley; 6. Andy Fitzgerald	1. Simon O'Brien*; 2. **Barbara Scott***; 3. Peter Bacich; 4. Patricia Waghorn; 5. Anthony Jarvis	1. **Jim Scott***; 2. Mary Jenkins	1. Don Millar; 2. Shirley de la Hunty	1. Cindy Hollings; 2. David Norman	1. Clarrie Isaacs; 2. Arun Pradhan
Independent candidates	Ungrouped candidates				
1. Huw Grossmith; 2. Mark Grossmith	Russell Aubrey (Ind); Alison de Garis (AMP)				

=== South West ===
Seven seats were up for election. The Labor Party was defending three seats. The Liberal Party was defending three seats. The National Party was defending one seat.

Labor candidates	Coalition candidates	Greens candidates	Democrats candidates	Natural Law candidates	CTA candidates	Ungrouped candidates
1. **Bob Thomas***; 2. **John Cowdell***; 3. Lois Anderson; 4. Marilyn Elson; 5. Gary De Jager	1. **Barry House*** (Lib); 2. **Bill Stretch*** (Lib); 3. **Muriel Patterson*** (Lib); 4. **Murray Montgomery*** (Nat); 5. John Silcock (Lib); 6. Robyn McSweeney (Lib); 7. Rick Beatty (Nat); 8. Pauline McLeod (Lib); 9. Steve Thomas (Lib); 10. Nigel Hallett (Lib)	1. Chrissy Sharp*; 2. Basil Schur; 3. Len Howard	1. Malcolm McKercher; 2. Helen van Noort	1. Ian Sandwell; 2. Elspeth Clairs	1. Justin Moseley; 2. Laurie Sugg	J J Amelia (AFP); Paul Roth (AMP)

== See also ==
- Members of the Western Australian Legislative Assembly, 1993–1996
- Members of the Western Australian Legislative Assembly, 1996–2001
- Members of the Western Australian Legislative Council, 1993–1997
- Members of the Western Australian Legislative Council, 1997–2001
- 1996 Western Australian state election
