= Candidates of the 1989 Western Australian state election =

The 1989 Western Australian state election was held on 4 February 1989.

== Retiring Members ==
=== Labor ===
- Ron Bertram MLA (Balcatta)
- David Evans MLA (Warren)
- Tom Jones MLA (Collie)
- Des Dans MLC (South Metropolitan)
- Bob Hetherington MLC (South-East Metropolitan)

=== Liberal ===
- Bert Crane MLA (Moore)
- Ross Lightfoot MLA (Murchison-Eyre)
- Reg Tubby MLA (Greenough)
- Tony Williams MLA (Clontarf)
- Colin Bell MLC (Lower West)
- Gordon Masters MLC (West Province)
- John Williams MLC (Metropolitan Province)

=== National ===
- Matt Stephens MLA (Stirling)
- Harry Gayfer MLC (Central Province)
- Tom McNeil MLC (Upper West)

== Legislative Assembly ==
Sitting members are shown in bold text. Successful candidates are highlighted in the relevant colour. Where there is possible confusion, an asterisk (*) is also used.

Electorate	Held by	Labor candidate	Liberal candidate	National candidate	Grey Power candidate	Other candidates
Albany	Liberal	Brian Bradley	**Leon Watt**	Michael Jardine		
Applecross	Liberal	Margaret Barton	**Richard Lewis**		Anthony Furness	
Armadale	Labor	**Bob Pearce**	Maureen Healy		William Higgins	Reginald Hames (Ind)
Ashburton	Labor	**Pam Buchanan**	Maurice Harper			David Fort (Ind)
Avon	National	Robert Duncanson	John Dival	**Max Trenorden**		
Balcatta	Labor	Nick Catania	Marie Wordsworth		Brendan O'Dwyer	
Belmont	Labor	**Eric Ripper**	Brett Whitford		Margaret Bright	Clem Cumbo (Ind); Barbara Turner (Dem)
Bunbury	Labor	**Phil Smith**	Raymond Bosustow		Margaret Charnley	David Morrissey (CEC); Judyth Salom (Ind)
Cockburn	Labor	**Bill Thomas**	Simon O'Brien		Isobel Davison	Alison Jensen (AC)
Collie	Labor	John Mumme	John Silcock	Hilda Turnbull		Ursula Bolitho (Dem); Alfred Bussell (Ind)
Cottesloe	Liberal	John Noonan	**Bill Hassell**		Marianne McCall	Martina Hagues (Dem)
Darling Range	Liberal	Maura Howlett	**Ian Thompson**		Eric Tommey	
Dianella	Labor	**Keith Wilson**	Terence Tyzack		John Greathead	Allan Jones (Ind)
Eyre	Labor	**Julian Grill**	Stephen Sprigg			Donald Green (Ind); Yvonne Hicks (Ind)
Floreat	Liberal	Clyde Bevan	**Andrew Mensaros**		Jane King	Georgina Beaumont (Dem)
Fremantle	Labor	**David Parker**	Peter Cumins		Jack Webb	Mary Druskovich (Dem); Dee Margetts (AC); John Troy (Ind)
Geraldton	Labor	**Jeff Carr**	Victor McCabe		Mary Gould	
Glendalough	Labor	**Carmen Lawrence**	Gloria Hancock		Donald Gudgeon	Clive Galletly (Ind)
Greenough	Liberal	Frank O'Loughlin	Kevin Minson	John Hutchinson		
Helena	Labor	**Gordon Hill**	**Bob Greig**		Cecil Morris	Jack van Tongeren (Ind)
Jandakot	Liberal	Clyde Bevan	**Barry MacKinnon**		Bryan Cortese	Timothy Thies (Ind)
Kalgoorlie	Labor	**Ian Taylor**	Douglas Bowie			John Burt (Ind); Peter Girando (Ind)
Kenwick	Labor	**Judyth Watson**	Joao Malta		William Meadwell	Donald Bryant (Dem); Jean Jeans (Ind)
Kimberley	Labor	**Ernie Bridge**	Maxine Reid			
Kingsley	Labor	Mark Nolan	Cheryl Edwardes		Francis Butler	Jack Christensen (Ind); Robert Gow (Ind)
Mandurah	Labor	**John Read**	Roger Nicholls		Barbara Stark	
Marangaroo	Labor	**Ted Cunningham**	William Lewis		James Wilson	
Marmion	Liberal	Jonathan Davies	**Jim Clarko**		Eric Hammond	Sharon McDonald (Grn)
Maylands	Labor	**Peter Dowding**	Peter Blaxell		John Redmond	Norman Heslington (Ind); Brian Peachey (AFM); Noel Sharp (Ind)
Melville	Labor	**Barry Hodge**	Doug Shave		Leslie Sells	Paul Llewellyn (Grn); Bernard Putnin (Ind)
Merredin	National	Michael Fitzpatrick		**Hendy Cowan**		Margaret Buegge (Ind)
Mitchell	Labor	**David Smith**	Beverley Bradshaw			
Moore	Liberal	John Mason	Bill McNee	**Mort Schell**		Edna Smith (Ind)
Morley	Labor	**Frank Donovan**	David MacGregor			
Murray	Labor	Keith Read	Brian McLean			Terence Caraher (Ind); Luna Gardiner (Ind); Susan Ishmael (Ind)
Nedlands	Liberal	Ross Connell	**Richard Court**		Douglas Ratcliffe	Kevin Judd (Dem)
Nollamara	Labor	John Kobelke	William Stewart			Brian Lobascher (Dem)
Northern Rivers	Labor	Kevin Leahy	**Dudley Maslen**			
Peel	Labor	**Norm Marlborough**	Marten Noordzy		Desmond Swiney	Michael Nella (Ind)
Perth	Labor	**Ian Alexander**	Kim Hames		Gerrard Taylor	Frederick Long (Dem)
Pilbara	Labor	Larry Graham	William Shephard			Vincent Cooper (Ind)
Riverton	Labor	Marilyn Crispin	Graham Kierath			Michael Smith (Ind); Eelco Tacoma (Ind); Neil Worrall (Dem)
Rockingham	Labor	**Mike Barnett**	Robert Douglas		Elsie Pledge	
Roe	Liberal	Peter Blond	Graham Jacobs	Ross Ainsworth		Dallas Clarnette (CEC)
Roleystone	Labor	Roger Stubbs	**Fred Tubby**		Frederick Betts	Edna Stevens (Ind); Maralyn Yorston (Ind)
Scarborough	Labor	**Graham Burkett**	George Strickland		Eugene Hands	Gaenor Cranch (Dem); Peter Rose (Ind)
South Perth	Liberal	Joan Davison	**Bill Grayden**		Beatrice Trutmann	David Smith (Ind)
Stirling	National	Lesley-Ann Hoare	Thomas Knight	**Monty House**	Paul Ensor	
Swan Hills	Labor	**Gavan Troy**	Neil Oliver		Eric Ridgway	
Thornlie	Labor	**Yvonne Henderson**	Antony York		Phillip Giblett	
Vasse	Liberal	Leslie Longwood	**Barry Blaikie**	Alan Hillier		
Victoria Park	Labor	**Geoff Gallop**	Katherine Mair		Joseph Mitchell	Marion Hercock (Dem); Michael Ward (Ind)
Wagin	National	David Whitney	John Chamberlain	**Bob Wiese**		
Wanneroo	Labor	**Jackie Watkins**	Brian Cooper		Peter Rowlands	Henrietta Waters (Ind)
Warren	Liberal	John Towie	Paul Omodei	Donald Hancock		
Wellington	Liberal	Ronald Mitchell	**John Bradshaw**		Wesley Betterton	
Whitford	Labor	**Pam Beggs**	Peter Harrop		Geoffrey Smart	John Clifford (Ind)

== Legislative Council ==
Sitting members are shown in bold text. Tickets that elected at least one MLC are highlighted in the relevant colour. Successful candidates are identified by an asterisk (*).

=== Agricultural ===
Five seats were up for election.

Labor candidates	Liberal candidates	National candidates	Democrats candidates	Green candidates	One Australia candidates
1. **Jim Brown***; 2. Kim Chance; 3. Lorna Long; 4. John Czuzman; 5. Mary Ridley	1. **Margaret McAleer***; 2. **David Wordsworth***; 3. Murray Nixon; 4. Ian Whitehurst; 5. Elizabeth Rocchi	1. **Eric Charlton***; 2. **John Caldwell***; 3. Dexter Davies; 4. Anthony Critch	1. Robert Whitehead	1. James Cavill; 2. Ronald Lewis	1. Cedric Jacobs; 2. Margaret Jacobs; 3. Malcolm Taylor

=== East Metropolitan ===
Five seats were up for election.

Labor candidates	Liberal candidates	National candidates	Democrats candidates	Green candidates	Grey Power candidates	One Australia candidates
1. **Kay Hallahan***; 2. **Fred McKenzie***; 3. **Tom Butler***; 4. Valma Ferguson; 5. Erik Van Garderen; 6. Stephen Gilchrist	1. Derrick Tomlinson*; 2. Peter Foss*; 3. June van de Klashorst; 4. Peter Quinn	1. Patrick Harding; 2. Beverley Poor	1. Pauline Hutchinson; 2. Benjamin Rose	1. L G Capill; 2. Patsy Molloy	1. Neil Turner; 2. Arthur Robertson	1. Donald Jackson; 2. Ronald Abbott

=== Mining and Pastoral ===
Five seats were up for election.

Labor candidates	Liberal candidates	National candidates	Democrats candidates	Green candidates	One Australia candidates	Ungrouped candidates
1. **Tom Stephens***; 2. **Mark Nevill***; 3. **Tom Helm***; 4. Robert Couzens; 5. Margaret Halid; 6. Sylvia Hurse	1. **Norman Moore***; 2. **Phil Lockyer***; 3. Margaret Day; 4. Sally Wilkinson; 5. Louie Carnicelli	1. Peter Kneebone; 2. Ronald Smales; 3. John Ford	1. Shyama Peebles	1. Leslie Lee; 2. Desmond Hill; 3. Brian Champion; 4. Allan Barker; 5. Jeanette Johnson	1. Megan Shedley; 2. Donald Shedley	Lynton Downe

=== North Metropolitan ===
Seven seats were up for election.

Labor candidates	Liberal candidates	National candidates	Democrats candidates	Green candidates	Grey Power candidates
1. **Joe Berinson***; 2. **Graham Edwards***; 3. **Sam Piantadosi***; 4. Kay Lunt; 5. Judith Jones; 6. Nick Griffiths; 7. Malcolm Jackson	1. George Cash*; 2. **Max Evans***; 3. Bob Pike*; 4. Reg Davies*; 5. Chris Ellison; 6. Wendy Cole; 7. Robert Burr	1. Elizabeth Beveridge; 2. Neil Baker; 3. Pamela Eves; 4. Duncan Anderson	1. Richard Jeffreys; 2. Brian Jenkins	1. Kim Herbert; 2. Nadine Lapthorne	1. Phillip King; 2. Kryna Gudgeon
Group A candidates	Group I candidates	One Australia candidates	Ungrouped candidates		
1. Peter Weygers; 2. John Massam	1. Shirley de la Hunty; 2. David Kaesehagen; 3. Norma Rundle	1. Ronald Holt; 2. Frank Gould; 3. Leonard Sherwood	1. Walter Morris		

=== South Metropolitan ===
Five seats were up for election.

Labor candidates	Liberal candidates	National candidates	Democrats candidates	Grey Power candidates	Alternative Coalition candidates
1. **Garry Kelly***; 2. **John Halden***; 3. Cheryl Davenport*; 4. Ed Dermer; 5. Reginald Gordon; 6. Joyce Edwards	1. **Clive Griffiths***; 2. **Phillip Pendal***; 3. Diane Airey; 4. Alan Harste; 5. John Hardwick	1. Miguel de San Miguel; 2. Leonard Phillips	1. Peter Nettleton; 2. David Banner	1. Neville Crilly	1. Christabel Bridge; 2. Robert Mann; 3. Gladys Yarran

=== South West ===
Seven seats were up for election.

Labor candidates	Liberal candidates	National candidates	Democrats candidates	Grey Power candidates	Group D candidates	Ungrouped candidates
1. **Doug Wenn***; 2. **Beryl Jones***; 3. Bob Thomas*; 4. Josephine Lynch; 5. Dane Carroll	1. **Barry House***; 2. Muriel Patterson*; 3. **Bill Stretch***; 4. Adrian Fawcett; 5. Suzanne Carter; 6. Jonathan Youngs	1. **Murray Montgomery***; 2. Terence House; 3. Jennifer Barrett	1. David Churches; 2. Daphne Wallace	1. Herbert Cattrall	1. Marie-Louise Duxbury; 2. Lynette Serventy	Paul Roth

== See also ==
- Members of the Western Australian Legislative Assembly, 1986–1989
- Members of the Western Australian Legislative Assembly, 1989–1993
- Members of the Western Australian Legislative Council, 1986–1989
- Members of the Western Australian Legislative Council, 1989–1993
- 1989 Western Australian state election
