= Members of the Western Australian Legislative Council, 1993–1997 =

This is a list of members of the Western Australian Legislative Council between 22 May 1993 and 21 May 1997:

Name	Party	Province	Years in office
Tom Butler^{[2]}	Labor	East Metropolitan	1986–1995
Alan Carstairs^{[4]}	Liberal	North Metropolitan	1996–1997
George Cash	Liberal	North Metropolitan	1989–2009
Kim Chance	Labor	Agricultural	1992–2009
Eric Charlton	National	Agricultural	1984–1998
John Cowdell	Labor	South West	1993–2005
Murray Criddle	National	Agricultural	1993–2008
Cheryl Davenport	Labor	South Metropolitan	1989–2001
Reg Davies	Independent	North Metropolitan	1989–1997
Ed Dermer^{[3]}	Labor	North Metropolitan	1996–2013
Bruce Donaldson	Liberal	Agricultural	1993–2009
Graham Edwards	Labor	North Metropolitan	1986–1997
Max Evans	Liberal	North Metropolitan	1986–2001
Valma Ferguson^{[2]}	Labor	East Metropolitan	1993; 1995–1997
Peter Foss	Liberal	East Metropolitan	1989–2005
Clive Griffiths	Liberal	South Metropolitan	1965–1997
Nick Griffiths	Labor	East Metropolitan	1993–2009
John Halden	Labor	South Metropolitan	1986–2000
Tom Helm	Labor	Mining and Pastoral	1986–2001
Barry House	Liberal	South West	1987–2017
Ross Lightfoot	Liberal	North Metropolitan	1993–1997
Phil Lockyer	Liberal	Mining and Pastoral	1980–1997
Iain MacLean^{[1]}^{[4]}	Liberal	North Metropolitan	1994–1996
Alannah MacTiernan^{[5]}	Labor	East Metropolitan	1993–1996; 2017–2023
Murray Montgomery	National	South West	1989–2001
Norman Moore	Liberal	Mining and Pastoral	1977–2013
Mark Nevill	Labor	Mining and Pastoral	1983–2001
Murray Nixon	Liberal	Agricultural	1993–2001
Muriel Patterson	Liberal	South West	1989–2001
Sam Piantadosi^{[3]}	Labor/Independent^{[3]}	North Metropolitan	1983–1996
Bob Pike^{[1]}	Liberal	North Metropolitan	1977–1983; 1989–1994
Barbara Scott	Liberal	South Metropolitan	1993–2009
Jim Scott	Greens	South Metropolitan	1993–2005
Tom Stephens	Labor	Mining and Pastoral	1982–2004
Bill Stretch	Liberal	South West	1983–2005
Paul Sulc^{[5]}	Labor	East Metropolitan	1996–1997
Bob Thomas	Labor	South West	1989–2001
Derrick Tomlinson	Liberal	East Metropolitan	1989–2005
Doug Wenn	Labor	South West	1986–1997

== Notes ==
^{1} On 26 April 1994, North Metropolitan Liberal MLC Bob Pike died. Liberal candidate Iain MacLean was elected in the resultant countback on 31 May 1994.
^{2} On 28 February 1995, East Metropolitan Labor MLC Tom Butler resigned. Labor candidate Valma Ferguson was elected in the resultant countback on 4 April 1995.
^{3} In April 1996, North Metropolitan MLC Sam Piantadosi left the Labor Party and sat as an independent. He resigned on 19 November 1996 to contest the seat of Yokine at the 1996 election. Labor candidate Ed Dermer, who had already won the seat effective from May 1997 at the aforementioned election, was elected at the resulted countback on 24 December 1996.
^{4} On 19 November 1996, North Metropolitan Liberal MLC Iain MacLean resigned to contest the seat of Wanneroo at the 1996 election. Liberal candidate Alan Carstairs was elected to the subsequent vacancy in a countback on 24 December 1996.
^{5} On 21 November 1996, East Metropolitan Labor MLC Alannah MacTiernan resigned to contest the seat of Armadale at the 1996 election. Labor member Paul Sulc was elected to the subsequent vacancy in a countback on 24 December 1996.
