= Members of the Western Australian Legislative Council, 1989–1993 =

This is a list of members of the Western Australian Legislative Council between 22 May 1989 and 21 May 1993. This was the first membership of the Council to be elected under the multi-member electorate system established by the Acts Amendment (Electoral Reform) Act 1987 (No.40 of 1987) where members were selected by proportional representation within six regions.

Name	Party	Province	Years in office
Diane Airey^{[4]}	Liberal	South Metropolitan	1993
Joe Berinson	Labor	North Metropolitan	1980–1993
Jim Brown^{[2]}	Labor	Agricultural	1980–1992
Tom Butler	Labor	East Metropolitan	1986–1995
John Caldwell	National	Agricultural	1986–1993
George Cash	Liberal	North Metropolitan	1989–2009
Kim Chance^{[2]}	Labor	Agricultural	1992–2009
Eric Charlton	National	Agricultural	1984–1998
Cheryl Davenport	Labor	South Metropolitan	1989–2001
Reg Davies	Liberal/Independent^{[1]}	North Metropolitan	1989–1997
Graham Edwards	Labor	North Metropolitan	1986–1997
Max Evans	Liberal	North Metropolitan	1986–2001
Valma Ferguson^{[3]}	Labor	East Metropolitan	1993; 1995–1997
Peter Foss	Liberal	East Metropolitan	1989–2005
Clive Griffiths	Liberal	South Metropolitan	1965–1997
John Halden	Labor	South Metropolitan	1986–2000
Kay Hallahan^{[3]}	Labor	East Metropolitan	1983–1993
Tom Helm	Labor	Mining and Pastoral	1986–2001
Barry House	Liberal	South West	1987–2017
Beryl Jones	Labor	South West	1986–1993
Garry Kelly	Labor	South Metropolitan	1982–1993
Phil Lockyer	Liberal	Mining and Pastoral	1980–1997
Margaret McAleer	Liberal	Agricultural	1974–1993
Fred McKenzie	Labor	East Metropolitan	1977–1993
Murray Montgomery	National	South West	1989–2001
Norman Moore	Liberal	Mining and Pastoral	1977–2013
Mark Nevill	Labor	Mining and Pastoral	1983–2001
Muriel Patterson	Liberal	South West	1989–2001
Phillip Pendal^{[4]}	Liberal	South Metropolitan	1980–1993
Sam Piantadosi	Labor	North Metropolitan	1983–1996
Bob Pike	Liberal	North Metropolitan	1977–1983; 1989–1994
Tom Stephens	Labor	Mining and Pastoral	1982–2004
Bill Stretch	Liberal	South West	1983–2005
Bob Thomas	Labor	South West	1989–2001
Derrick Tomlinson	Liberal	East Metropolitan	1989–2005
Doug Wenn	Labor	South West	1986–1997
David Wordsworth	Liberal	Agricultural	1971–1993

== Notes ==
^{1} On 10 July 1991, North Metropolitan MLC Reg Davies, elected as a Liberal, left the party and sat as an Independent.
^{2} On 3 March 1992, Agricultural Labor MLC Jim Brown resigned. Labor candidate Kim Chance was appointed to the resulting casual vacancy on 18 March 1992.
^{3} On 13 January 1993, East Metropolitan Labor MLC Kay Hallahan resigned to contest the seat of Armadale at the 1993 election. Labor candidate Valma Ferguson was elected by a countback on 2 February 1993 to fill the vacancy, but was not sworn in.
^{4} On 14 January 1993, South Metropolitan Liberal MLC Phillip Pendal resigned to contest the seat of South Perth at the 1993 election. Liberal candidate Diane Airey was elected by a countback on 2 February 1993 to fill the vacancy, but was not sworn in.
