= Members of the Western Australian Legislative Council, 1997–2001 =

This is a list of members of the Western Australian Legislative Council between 22 May 1997 and 21 May 2001:

Name	Party	Province	Years in office
George Cash	Liberal	North Metropolitan	1989–2009
Kim Chance	Labor	Agricultural	1992–2009
Eric Charlton^{[1]}	National	Agricultural	1984–1998
John Cowdell	Labor	South West	1993–2005
Murray Criddle	National	Agricultural	1993–2008
Cheryl Davenport	Labor	South Metropolitan	1989–2001
Dexter Davies^{[1]}	National	Agricultural	1998–2001
Ed Dermer	Labor	North Metropolitan	1996–2013
Bruce Donaldson	Liberal	Agricultural	1993–2009
Max Evans	Liberal	North Metropolitan	1986–2001
Peter Foss	Liberal	East Metropolitan	1989–2005
Graham Giffard^{[3]}	Labor	South Metropolitan	2000–2008
Nick Griffiths	Labor	East Metropolitan	1993–2009
John Halden^{[3]}	Labor	South Metropolitan	1986–2000
Ray Halligan	Liberal	North Metropolitan	1997–2009
Tom Helm	Labor/Independent^{[4]}	Mining and Pastoral	1986–2001
Helen Hodgson	Democrat	North Metropolitan	1997–2001
Barry House	Liberal	South West	1987–2017
Norm Kelly	Democrat	East Metropolitan	1997–2001
Murray Montgomery	National	South West	1989–2001
Norman Moore	Liberal	Mining and Pastoral	1977–2013
Mark Nevill	Labor/Independent^{[2]}	Mining and Pastoral	1983–2001
Murray Nixon	Liberal	Agricultural	1993–2001
Simon O'Brien	Liberal	South Metropolitan	1997–2021
Muriel Patterson	Liberal	South West	1989–2001
Ljiljanna Ravlich	Labor	East Metropolitan	1997–2015
Barbara Scott	Liberal	South Metropolitan	1993–2009
Jim Scott	Greens	South Metropolitan	1993–2005
Chrissy Sharp	Greens	South West	1997–2005
Greg Smith	Liberal	Mining and Pastoral	1997–2001
Tom Stephens	Labor	Mining and Pastoral	1982–2004
Bill Stretch	Liberal	South West	1983–2005
Bob Thomas	Labor	South West	1989–2001
Derrick Tomlinson	Liberal	East Metropolitan	1989–2005
Ken Travers	Labor	North Metropolitan	1997–2016
Giz Watson	Greens	North Metropolitan	1997–2013

== Notes ==
^{1} On 28 July 1998, Agricultural Nationals MLC Eric Charlton resigned. Nationals candidate Dexter Davies was elected in the resultant countback on 11 August 2008.
^{2} Mining and Pastoral MLC Mark Nevill was elected as a representative of the Labor Party, but left the party on 23 August 1999 and sat as an independent.
^{3} On 20 January 2000, South Metropolitan Labor MLC John Halden resigned in order to take up the position of party state president. Labor candidate Graham Giffard was elected in the resultant countback on 7 February 2000.
^{4} Mining and Pastoral MLC Tom Helm was elected as a representative of the Labor Party, but left the party on 27 July 2000 and sat as an independent after losing preselection for the 2001 state election.
