= Colin Holt (politician) =

Australian politician (born 1963)

Member of the Legislative Council of Western Australia
- In office 22 May 2009 – 21 May 2021 Serving with Farina, Hallett, House, McSweeney, Talbot
- Constituency: South West Region

Personal details
- Born: Colin James Holt; 31 August 1963 (age 63) Goomalling, Western Australia
- Party: National
- Education: University of Western Australia

Colin James Holt (born 31 August 1963) is an Australian politician who was a National Party member of the Legislative Council of Western Australia from 2009 to 2021, representing South West Region. He served as a minister in the government of Colin Barnett between December 2014 and August 2016.

== Early life ==
Holt was born in Goomalling, Western Australia, to Violet May (née Waldock) and Frank Holt. He attended high school in Perth, at Lockridge Senior High School, and then went on to study zoology at the University of Western Australia. After graduating, Holt worked for the state government's Department of Agriculture as a community development consultant, living for periods in Derby, Halls Creek, Bruce Rock, Carnarvon, Narrogin and Australind. He later also worked as a company director for the Arid Group, a transport business.

== Politics ==
Holt first stood for parliament at the 2005 state election, running second on the Nationals' ticket for the South West Region. At the 2008 election, he was made the party's lead candidate, and was elected. From 2011 to 2013, Holt was deputy chairman of committees in the Legislative Council. He was made a parliamentary secretary after the 2013 election, and in December 2014 was elevated to the ministry, replacing Bill Marmion as Minister for Housing and Terry Waldron as Minister for Racing and Gaming. Holt resigned from the ministry in August 2016, allowing the new National Party leader, Brendon Grylls, to return to cabinet.

== See also ==
- Barnett Ministry

Political offices
| Preceded by Bill Marmion | Minister for Housing; 2014–2016 | Succeeded by Brendon Grylls |
| Preceded by Terry Waldron | Minister for Racing and Gaming; 2014–2016 | Succeeded by Brendon Grylls |
