= Shyama Peebles =

Australian politician and activist (1942–2012)

Shyama Heather Peebles
- Born: 1942
- Died: 2012
- Occupation(s): Politician, historian, environmental activist
- Known for: Anti-nuclear activism, environmental advocacy in Western Australia
- Awards: Bessie Rischbieth Conservation Award (1995)

Shyama Heather Peebles (1942–2012) was a Western Australian politician, outback historian and anti-nuclear activist from the Goldfields region.

== Career ==
Shyama ran as a candidate for the Australian Democrats in Western Australian and Australian elections during the period 1989–1993. She wrote a 20-page illustrated booklet entitled Uranium mining in Western Australia : exploration doublespeak which was published by Goldfields Against Serious Pollution in Kalgoorlie in 1989. In 1995 she was awarded the Bessie Rischbieth Conservation Award from the Conservation Council of Western Australia for her contribution to environmental conservation in Western Australia.
