= Results of the 1996 Western Australian state election (Legislative Assembly) =

Western Australian state election, 14 December 1996 Legislative Assembly << 1993–2001 >>
Enrolled voters	1,119,992				
Votes cast	1,007,835		Turnout	89.99%	–3.51%
Informal votes	44,229		Informal	4.39%	+0.26%
Summary of votes by party
Party	Primary votes	%	Swing	Seats	Change
Liberal	384,518	39.90%	–4.25%	29	+ 3
Labor	345,159	35.82%	–1.26%	19	– 5
National	55,817	5.79%	+0.46%	6	± 0
Democrats	48,985	5.08%	+2.76%	0	± 0
Greens	45,550	4.73%	+0.42%	0	± 0
Marijuana	3,245	0.34%	+0.34%	0	± 0
Other parties	6,929	0.72%	–4.35%	0	± 0
Independent^{[1]}	74,179	7.70%	+1.21%	3	+ 2
Total	963,606			57	
Two-party-preferred
Liberal/National	530,603	55.16%	–0.28%		
Labor	431,245	44.84%	+0.28%		

This is a list of electoral district results of the 1996 Western Australian election.

== Results by electoral district ==
=== Albany ===
1996 Western Australian state election: Albany
Party	Candidate	Votes	%	±%
Liberal	Kevin Prince	6,649	57.9	+25.7
Labor	Matt Benson-Lidholm	3,873	33.8	+3.7
CALM Resistance Movement	Rob Moir	952	8.3	+6.6
Total formal votes		11,474	95.4	+0.0
Informal votes		550	4.6	−0.0
Turnout		12,024	92.3	
Two-party-preferred result
Liberal	Kevin Prince	7,096	61.9	+1.1
Labor	Matt Benson-Lidholm	4,368	38.1	−1.1
Liberal hold		Swing	+1.1	

=== Alfred Cove ===
1996 Western Australian state election: Alfred Cove
Party	Candidate	Votes	%	±%
Liberal	Doug Shave	10,657	49.9	−15.6
Independent	Penny Hearne	5,756	27.0	+27.0
Labor	Louise Pratt	4,134	19.4	−3.9
Independent	Lyn Edwards	802	3.8	+3.8
Total formal votes		21,349	97.4	+0.7
Informal votes		569	2.6	−0.7
Turnout		21,918	91.0	
Two-candidate-preferred result
Liberal	Doug Shave	11,182	52.4	−18.7
Independent	Penny Hearne	10,148	47.6	+47.6
Liberal hold		Swing	−18.7	

=== Armadale ===
1996 Western Australian state election: Armadale
Party	Candidate	Votes	%	±%
Labor	Alannah MacTiernan	9,667	44.4	−4.4
Liberal	Tony Andretta	6,830	31.4	−7.7
Independent	Spike Fokkema	4,036	18.6	+18.6
Democrats	Raelene Watson	1,221	5.6	+3.1
Total formal votes		21,754	95.0	−0.2
Informal votes		1,155	5.0	+0.2
Turnout		22,909	90.7	
Two-party-preferred result
Labor	Alannah MacTiernan	11,732	54.0	−1.0
Liberal	Tony Andretta	9,982	46.0	+1.0
Labor hold		Swing	−1.0	

=== Avon ===
1996 Western Australian state election: Avon
Party	Candidate	Votes	%	±%
National	Max Trenorden	6,795	60.9	+22.9
Labor	Paul Andrews	3,080	27.6	−2.4
Independent	Stephen Bluck	1,276	11.4	+11.4
Total formal votes		11,151	95.4	−0.9
Informal votes		536	4.6	+0.9
Turnout		11,687	91.0	
Two-party-preferred result
National	Max Trenorden	7,435	66.8	+1.9
Labor	Paul Andrews	3,703	33.2	−1.9
National hold		Swing	+1.9	

=== Ballajura ===
1996 Western Australian state election: Ballajura
Party	Candidate	Votes	%	±%
Liberal	Rhonda Parker	9,974	43.5	−1.6
Labor	John D'Orazio	9,273	40.5	−1.9
Marijuana	Dave Sayer	869	3.8	+3.8
Greens	Heather Aquilina	750	3.3	+1.0
Independent	Robert Farrell	712	3.1	+3.1
Democrats	Jim Kerr	703	3.1	+2.7
Independent	Raymond Nelson	643	2.8	+2.8
Total formal votes		22,924	94.2	−1.7
Informal votes		1,402	5.8	+1.7
Turnout		24,326	92.5	
Two-party-preferred result
Liberal	Rhonda Parker	11,463	50.1	−1.5
Labor	John D'Orazio	11,419	49.9	+1.5
Liberal hold		Swing	−1.5	

=== Bassendean ===
1996 Western Australian state election: Bassendean
Party	Candidate	Votes	%	±%
Labor	Clive Brown	11,349	54.2	+2.1
Liberal	Shane Shenton	6,986	33.3	+0.4
Democrats	Kathy Ready	2,620	12.5	+11.1
Total formal votes		20,955	94.1	−0.7
Informal votes		1,312	5.9	+0.7
Turnout		22,267	91.0	
Two-party-preferred result
Labor	Clive Brown	12,973	62.0	+2.2
Liberal	Shane Shenton	7,945	38.0	−2.2
Labor hold		Swing	+2.2	

=== Belmont ===
1996 Western Australian state election: Belmont
Party	Candidate	Votes	%	±%
Labor	Eric Ripper	9,910	48.0	−1.2
Liberal	Andrew Murfin	7,605	36.9	−1.8
Greens	Teresa Castillo	1,729	8.4	+3.8
Democrats	Val Preston	1,385	6.7	+4.4
Total formal votes		20,629	93.8	−0.9
Informal votes		1,357	6.2	+0.9
Turnout		21,986	90.4	
Two-party-preferred result
Labor	Eric Ripper	11,834	57.5	+2.1
Liberal	Andrew Murfin	8,736	42.5	−2.1
Labor hold		Swing	+2.1	

=== Bunbury ===
1996 Western Australian state election: Bunbury
Party	Candidate	Votes	%	±%
Liberal	Ian Osborne	5,322	47.7	+2.1
Labor	Barry Down	3,740	33.5	−9.9
Independent	Mary Collins	1,069	9.6	+9.6
Greens	Joan Jenkins	585	5.2	−1.3
Democrats	Ronald Hellyer	256	2.3	+2.1
Independent	Joanne Hill	195	1.7	+1.7
Total formal votes		11,167	96.0	−0.6
Informal votes		467	4.0	+0.6
Turnout		11,634	91.1	
Two-party-preferred result
Liberal	Ian Osborne	6,166	55.3	+5.0
Labor	Barry Down	4,993	44.7	−5.0
Liberal hold		Swing	+5.0	

=== Burrup ===
1996 Western Australian state election: Burrup
Party	Candidate	Votes	%	±%
Labor	Fred Riebeling	4,436	47.5	−7.8
Liberal	Barry Haase	3,627	38.8	+4.7
National	Paul Ausburn	1,284	13.7	+13.7
Total formal votes		9,347	96.2	+0.2
Informal votes		365	3.8	−0.2
Turnout		9,712	84.1	
Two-party-preferred result
Labor	Fred Riebeling	4,828	51.7	−9.7
Liberal	Barry Haase	4,518	48.3	+9.7
Labor hold		Swing	−9.7	

=== Carine ===
1996 Western Australian state election: Carine
Party	Candidate	Votes	%	±%
Liberal	Katie Hodson-Thomas	10,124	46.5	−17.9
Independent	Peter Kyle	5,069	23.3	+23.3
Labor	Ros Harley	3,640	16.7	−7.2
Independent	John Bombak	1,531	7.0	+7.0
Greens	Catherine Goh	1,412	6.5	+0.3
Total formal votes		21,776	97.6	+0.1
Informal votes		546	2.4	−0.1
Turnout		22,322	92.1	
Two-candidate-preferred result
Liberal	Katie Hodson-Thomas	11,360	52.2	−17.7
Independent	Peter Kyle	10,387	47.8	+47.8
Liberal hold		Swing	−17.7	

=== Churchlands ===
1996 Western Australian state election: Churchlands
Party	Candidate	Votes	%	±%
Independent	Liz Constable	17,254	83.2	+35.6
Labor	Geoffrey Baker	3,478	16.8	+10.0
Total formal votes		20,732	97.7	+0.0
Informal votes		492	2.3	−0.0
Turnout		21,224	89.7	
Independent hold		Swing	+5.1	

=== Cockburn ===
1996 Western Australian state election: Cockburn
Party	Candidate	Votes	%	±%
Labor	Bill Thomas	10,326	50.9	−3.4
Liberal	Wendy Blake	6,793	33.5	−2.1
Greens	Nadine Lapthorne	1,749	8.6	+2.1
Democrats	Jakica Zaknic	1,427	7.0	+3.8
Total formal votes		20,295	94.1	−0.2
Informal votes		1,267	5.9	+0.2
Turnout		21,562	91.9	
Two-party-preferred result
Labor	Bill Thomas	12,245	60.6	+0.2
Liberal	Wendy Blake	7,976	39.4	−0.2
Labor hold		Swing	+0.2	

=== Collie ===
1996 Western Australian state election: Collie
Party	Candidate	Votes	%	±%
National	Hilda Turnbull	6,954	59.3	+26.1
Labor	Mick Murray	4,779	40.7	+1.8
Total formal votes		11,733	97.5	+1.0
Informal votes		295	2.5	−1.0
Turnout		12,028	92.4	
National hold		Swing	+0.9	

=== Cottesloe ===
1996 Western Australian state election: Cottesloe
Party	Candidate	Votes	%	±%
Liberal	Colin Barnett	12,572	60.5	−1.6
Labor	Paul Cecchini	3,766	18.1	−1.0
Greens	Steve Walker	2,874	13.8	+3.7
Democrats	Ken Meyer	1,560	7.5	+3.8
Total formal votes		20,772	97.2	−0.3
Informal votes		602	2.8	+0.3
Turnout		21,374	88.0	
Two-party-preferred result
Liberal	Colin Barnett	14,462	69.8	−2.2
Labor	Paul Cecchini	6,268	30.2	+2.2
Liberal hold		Swing	−2.2	

=== Darling Range ===
1996 Western Australian state election: Darling Range
Party	Candidate	Votes	%	±%
Liberal	John Day	11,711	54.9	+2.5
Labor	Geoff Stallard	5,876	27.5	−0.7
Democrats	Gail Kelly	1,923	9.0	+7.8
Greens	Stewart Jackson	1,830	8.6	+3.2
Total formal votes		21,340	95.2	−0.8
Informal votes		1,066	4.8	+0.8
Turnout		22,406	91.8	
Two-party-preferred result
Liberal	John Day	13,390	62.9	−0.5
Labor	Geoff Stallard	7,912	37.1	+0.5
Liberal hold		Swing	−0.5	

=== Dawesville ===
1996 Western Australian state election: Dawesville
Party	Candidate	Votes	%	±%
Liberal	Arthur Marshall	6,183	50.0	−0.1
Labor	John Hughes	4,098	33.1	−7.8
Independent	Alan Gent	1,163	9.4	+9.4
Independent	Shelby Pearson	506	4.1	+4.1
Democrats	Andrew Harrison	420	3.4	+2.4
Total formal votes		12,370	96.7	+0.4
Informal votes		416	3.3	−0.4
Turnout		12,786	90.3	
Two-party-preferred result
Liberal	Arthur Marshall	7,398	59.9	+5.3
Labor	John Hughes	4,947	40.1	−5.3
Liberal hold		Swing	+5.3	

=== Eyre ===
1996 Western Australian state election: Eyre
Party	Candidate	Votes	%	±%
Labor	Julian Grill	4,611	57.2	+3.6
National	Kathy Finlayson	1,732	21.5	+21.5
Liberal	Don Green	1,714	21.3	−14.1
Total formal votes		8,057	95.1	−0.4
Informal votes		418	4.9	+0.4
Turnout		8,475	80.1	
Two-party-preferred result
Labor	Julian Grill	4,908	61.0	+2.8
National	Kathy Finlayson	3,139	39.0	+39.0
Labor hold		Swing	+2.8	

=== Fremantle ===
1996 Western Australian state election: Fremantle
Party	Candidate	Votes	%	±%
Labor	Jim McGinty	9,096	45.8	−0.3
Liberal	Michael Mallis	6,479	32.6	−3.2
Greens	Elisabeth Jones	2,874	14.5	+6.0
Democrats	Corey Watts	1,420	7.1	+4.7
Total formal votes		19,869	94.7	+2.9
Informal votes		1,107	5.3	−2.9
Turnout		20,976	88.7	
Two-party-preferred result
Labor	Jim McGinty	12,153	61.3	+4.6
Liberal	Michael Mallis	7,662	38.7	−4.6
Labor hold		Swing	+4.6	

=== Geraldton ===
1996 Western Australian state election: Geraldton
Party	Candidate	Votes	%	±%
Liberal	Bob Bloffwitch	5,237	50.3	+9.6
Labor	Laurie Graham	3,641	35.0	+1.3
Independent	Tony Cogan	1,194	11.5	+11.5
Democrats	Stephan Gyorgy	330	3.2	+3.2
Total formal votes		10,402	96.0	−0.5
Informal votes		428	4.0	+0.5
Turnout		10,830	88.2	
Two-party-preferred result
Liberal	Bob Bloffwitch	5,912	57.0	−2.8
Labor	Laurie Graham	4,468	43.0	+2.8
Liberal hold		Swing	−2.8	

=== Girrawheen ===
1996 Western Australian state election: Girrawheen
Party	Candidate	Votes	%	±%
Labor	Ted Cunningham	10,689	55.9	−1.5
Liberal	Avis Gobby	6,240	32.6	+0.9
Democrats	Margaret Evans	2,200	11.5	+10.0
Total formal votes		19,129	93.1	−1.8
Informal votes		1,412	6.9	+1.8
Turnout		20,541	89.2	
Two-party-preferred result
Labor	Ted Cunningham	11,966	62.6	−0.9
Liberal	Avis Gobby	7,143	37.4	+0.9
Labor hold		Swing	−0.9	

=== Greenough ===
1996 Western Australian state election: Greenough
Party	Candidate	Votes	%	±%
Liberal	Kevin Minson	8,202	72.1	+15.7
Labor	Carl Reynolds	3,172	27.9	+2.7
Total formal votes		11,374	96.9	+0.3
Informal votes		367	3.1	−0.3
Turnout		11,741	90.1	
Liberal hold		Swing	+0.4	

=== Hillarys ===
1996 Western Australian state election: Hillarys
Party	Candidate	Votes	%	±%
Liberal	Rob Johnson	12,085	53.3	+2.6
Labor	Tony O'Gorman	7,442	32.8	−1.0
Democrats	Sylvia Smith	3,139	13.8	+9.3
Total formal votes		22,666	95.6	−1.3
Informal votes		1,036	4.4	+1.3
Turnout		23,702	91.3	
Two-party-preferred result
Liberal	Rob Johnson	13,544	59.9	+0.9
Labor	Tony O'Gorman	9,081	40.1	−0.9
Liberal hold		Swing	+0.9	

=== Innaloo ===
1996 Western Australian state election: Innaloo
Party	Candidate	Votes	%	±%
Liberal	George Strickland	9,516	46.1	−1.8
Labor	Anne Barrett	7,334	35.6	−4.7
Greens	Merilyn Keillor	1,566	7.6	+1.7
Democrats	Peter Markham	1,320	6.4	+3.7
Marijuana	Paul Shann	893	4.3	+4.3
Total formal votes		20,629	94.7	−1.5
Informal votes		1,159	5.3	+1.5
Turnout		21,788	89.6	
Two-party-preferred result
Liberal	George Strickland	11,117	54.0	+1.4
Labor	Anne Barrett	9,489	46.0	−1.4
Liberal hold		Swing	+1.4	

=== Joondalup ===
1996 Western Australian state election: Joondalup
Party	Candidate	Votes	%	±%
Liberal	Chris Baker	10,557	47.5	+4.0
Labor	Dianne Guise	7,777	35.0	−5.8
Greens	Steve Magyar	1,527	6.9	+2.0
Democrats	Sarah Gilfillan	1,238	5.6	+3.1
Marijuana	Leigh Smith	809	3.6	+3.6
Australian People's Party	Peter Rowlands	326	1.5	+1.5
Total formal votes		22,234	95.8	−0.7
Informal votes		983	4.2	+0.7
Turnout		23,217	91.5	
Two-party-preferred result
Liberal	Chris Baker	12,318	55.5	+4.0
Labor	Dianne Guise	9,884	44.5	−4.0
Liberal hold		Swing	+4.0	

=== Kalgoorlie ===
1996 Western Australian state election: Kalgoorlie
Party	Candidate	Votes	%	±%
Labor	Megan Anwyl	4,985	46.7	−5.9
Liberal	Karen McGay	3,435	32.2	−2.6
National	Doug Daws	1,349	12.6	+12.6
Independent	Darby Renton	898	8.4	+8.4
Total formal votes		10,667	96.7	+0.3
Informal votes		369	3.3	−0.3
Turnout		11,036	86.5	
Two-party-preferred result
Labor	Megan Anwyl	5,793	54.4	−3.2
Liberal	Karen McGay	4,859	45.6	+3.2
Labor hold		Swing	−3.2	

=== Kimberley ===
1996 Western Australian state election: Kimberley
Party	Candidate	Votes	%	±%
Independent	Ernie Bridge	2,727	33.8	+33.8
Independent	Brian Martin	2,365	29.3	+29.3
Liberal	David Parker	2,265	28.1	−8.4
National	James O'Kenny	711	8.8	+8.8
Total formal votes		8,068	96.9	−1.3
Informal votes		257	3.1	+1.3
Turnout		8,325	68.7	
Two-candidate-preferred result
Independent	Ernie Bridge	4,954	61.5	+61.5
Liberal	David Parker	3,104	38.5	+2.0
Independent gain from Labor		Swing	+61.5	

=== Kingsley ===
1996 Western Australian state election: Kingsley
Party	Candidate	Votes	%	±%
Liberal	Cheryl Edwardes	11,843	54.4	−4.0
Labor	Jon Davies	7,071	32.5	+0.1
Democrats	Bert Toonen	2,866	13.2	+9.0
Total formal votes		21,780	95.4	−1.5
Informal votes		1,058	4.6	+1.5
Turnout		22,838	92.8	
Two-party-preferred result
Liberal	Cheryl Edwardes	13,104	60.2	−2.6
Labor	Jon Davies	8,649	39.8	+2.6
Liberal hold		Swing	−2.6	

=== Mandurah ===
1996 Western Australian state election: Mandurah
Party	Candidate	Votes	%	±%
Liberal	Roger Nicholls	5,281	47.5	−2.9
Labor	Kevin Holmes	4,374	39.3	−2.0
Independent	John Smith	608	5.5	+5.5
Greens	Patricia Keddie	569	5.1	+2.3
Democrats	Marjorie McKercher	284	2.6	+2.3
Total formal votes		11,116	96.2	+0.5
Informal votes		443	3.8	−0.5
Turnout		11,559	91.0	
Two-party-preferred result
Liberal	Roger Nicholls	5,877	53.0	−1.2
Labor	Kevin Holmes	5,215	47.0	+1.2
Liberal hold		Swing	−1.2	

=== Maylands ===
1996 Western Australian state election: Maylands
Party	Candidate	Votes	%	±%
Labor	Judy Edwards	9,516	47.0	+0.6
Liberal	Bev Brennan	7,564	37.3	−3.1
Greens	Colin Speed	1,822	9.0	+3.2
Democrats	Pat Lim	1,361	6.7	+3.9
Total formal votes		20,263	94.6	−0.9
Informal votes		1,162	5.4	+0.9
Turnout		21,425	89.2	
Two-party-preferred result
Labor	Judy Edwards	11,549	57.1	+3.1
Liberal	Bev Brennan	8,678	42.9	−3.1
Labor hold		Swing	+3.1	

=== Merredin ===
1996 Western Australian state election: Merredin
Party	Candidate	Votes	%	±%
National	Hendy Cowan	9,488	81.2	+30.9
Labor	Mick Cole	2,203	18.8	+3.7
Total formal votes		11,691	97.6	+0.4
Informal votes		282	2.4	−0.4
Turnout		11,973	91.8	
National hold		Swing	+1.1	

=== Midland ===
1996 Western Australian state election: Midland
Party	Candidate	Votes	%	±%
Labor	Michelle Roberts	10,340	47.1	+0.4
Liberal	Anne Fergusson-Stewart	8,745	39.8	+1.2
Democrats	Michael Preston	2,890	13.2	+11.7
Total formal votes		21,975	94.5	−0.6
Informal votes		1,278	5.5	+0.6
Turnout		23,253	91.9	
Two-party-preferred result
Labor	Michelle Roberts	11,912	54.3	0.0
Liberal	Anne Fergusson-Stewart	10,032	45.7	0.0
Labor hold		Swing	0.0	

=== Mitchell ===
1996 Western Australian state election: Mitchell
Party	Candidate	Votes	%	±%
Liberal	Dan Sullivan	6,146	48.2	+6.6
Labor	Melissa Parke	5,272	41.4	−2.6
Greens	Peter Eckersley	701	5.5	+0.2
National	Peter Prowse	343	2.7	+2.7
Democrats	Morgan Wilde	279	2.2	+0.8
Total formal votes		12,741	96.6	−0.2
Informal votes		450	3.4	+0.2
Turnout		13,191	92.8	
Two-party-preferred result
Liberal	Dan Sullivan	6,774	53.2	+3.7
Labor	Melissa Parke	5,961	46.8	−3.7
Liberal gain from Labor		Swing	+3.7	

=== Moore ===
1996 Western Australian state election: Moore
Party	Candidate	Votes	%	±%
Liberal	Bill McNee	8,497	77.9	+22.1
Labor	Steve Kirby	2,409	22.1	+3.7
Total formal votes		10,906	97.4	+0.6
Informal votes		291	2.6	−0.6
Turnout		11,197	91.7	
Liberal hold		Swing	−0.7	

=== Murdoch ===
1996 Western Australian state election: Murdoch
Party	Candidate	Votes	%	±%
Liberal	Mike Board	12,387	60.0	−6.5
Labor	Monica Fitz	5,538	26.8	+1.1
Greens	Graham Lapthorne	2,705	13.1	+12.4
Total formal votes		20,630	96.2	−1.0
Informal votes		805	3.8	+1.0
Turnout		21,435	91.4	
Two-party-preferred result
Liberal	Mike Board	13,401	65.1	−5.0
Labor	Monica Fitz	7,197	34.9	+5.0
Liberal hold		Swing	−5.0	

=== Murray-Wellington ===
1996 Western Australian state election: Murray-Wellington
Party	Candidate	Votes	%	±%
Liberal	John Bradshaw	6,401	54.7	+0.9
Labor	Laurie Preston	3,513	30.0	−4.8
Australia First	Morris Bessant	1,006	8.6	+8.6
Democrats	Les Taylor	592	5.1	+2.4
Citizens Electoral Council	Brian McCarthy	186	1.6	+1.6
Total formal votes		11,698	95.3	−0.4
Informal votes		579	4.7	+0.4
Turnout		12,277	91.5	
Two-party-preferred result
Liberal	John Bradshaw	7,247	62.0	+1.7
Labor	Laurie Preston	4,434	38.0	−1.7
Liberal hold		Swing	+1.7	

=== Nedlands ===
1996 Western Australian state election: Nedlands
Party	Candidate	Votes	%	±%
Liberal	Richard Court	11,429	56.6	−7.3
Labor	Neil Roberts	4,015	19.9	−0.5
Greens	Mark Lockett	2,247	11.1	+0.6
Democrats	Michael Barrett	1,577	7.8	+3.1
Independent	Michael Parks	915	4.5	+4.5
Total formal votes		20,183	97.3	+0.3
Informal votes		556	2.7	−0.3
Turnout		20,739	87.9	
Two-party-preferred result
Liberal	Richard Court	13,054	64.9	−5.4
Labor	Neil Roberts	7,073	35.1	+5.4
Liberal hold		Swing	−5.4	

=== Ningaloo ===
1996 Western Australian state election: Ningaloo
Party	Candidate	Votes	%	±%
Labor	Kevin Leahy	3,621	41.6	−3.8
Liberal	Rod Sweetman	3,133	36.0	−3.7
National	Margaret Day	1,175	13.5	+6.4
Greens	John Blinkhorn	557	6.4	+1.5
Democrats	Douglas Bearham	218	2.5	+0.8
Total formal votes		8,704	96.2	−0.1
Informal votes		348	3.8	+0.1
Turnout		9,052	83.0	
Two-party-preferred result
Liberal	Rod Sweetman	4,407	50.7	+1.9
Labor	Kevin Leahy	4,288	49.3	−1.9
Liberal gain from Labor		Swing	+1.9	

=== Nollamara ===
1996 Western Australian state election: Nollamara
Party	Candidate	Votes	%	±%
Labor	John Kobelke	10,493	53.9	+1.1
Liberal	Brad Waghorn	7,178	36.9	+0.2
Democrats	Sean Roda	1,801	9.2	+8.3
Total formal votes		19,472	92.6	−2.3
Informal votes		1,566	7.4	+2.3
Turnout		21,038	90.3	
Two-party-preferred result
Labor	John Kobelke	11,449	58.9	+0.5
Liberal	Brad Waghorn	7,998	41.1	−0.5
Labor hold		Swing	+0.5	

=== Peel ===
1996 Western Australian state election: Peel
Party	Candidate	Votes	%	±%
Labor	Norm Marlborough	11,605	53.5	−3.8
Independent	Bill Hall	3,817	17.6	+17.6
Liberal	James O'Malley	3,573	16.5	−12.6
Greens	Paul Lewis	1,604	7.4	−0.5
Democrats	David Coombs	1,100	5.1	+1.8
Total formal votes		21,699	94.9	−0.5
Informal votes		1,161	5.1	+0.5
Turnout		22,860	89.3	
Two-candidate-preferred result
Labor	Norm Marlborough	13,238	61.2	−2.7
Independent	Bill Hall	8,385	38.8	+38.8
Labor hold		Swing	−2.7	

=== Perth ===
1996 Western Australian state election: Perth
Party	Candidate	Votes	%	±%
Labor	Diana Warnock	8,501	47.0	+3.7
Liberal	Janet Davidson	6,710	37.1	−2.1
Greens	Elena Jeffreys	2,087	11.5	+3.7
Independent	Raymond Conder	803	4.4	+4.4
Total formal votes		18,101	94.7	+1.3
Informal votes		1,008	5.3	−1.3
Turnout		19,109	86.3	
Two-party-preferred result
Labor	Diana Warnock	10,461	57.9	+4.1
Liberal	Janet Davidson	7,597	42.1	−4.1
Labor hold		Swing	+4.1	

=== Pilbara ===
1996 Western Australian state election: Pilbara
Party	Candidate	Votes	%	±%
Labor	Larry Graham	4,284	63.8	+4.9
Liberal	Domenick Palumbo	1,964	29.3	+5.8
National	Anne O'Donoghue	465	6.9	+6.8
Total formal votes		6,713	95.4	+0.5
Informal votes		324	4.6	−0.5
Turnout		7,037	68.1	
Two-party-preferred result
Labor	Larry Graham	4,407	65.7	−2.4
Liberal	Domenick Palumbo	2,300	34.3	+2.4
Labor hold		Swing	−2.4	

=== Riverton ===
1996 Western Australian state election: Riverton
Party	Candidate	Votes	%	±%
Liberal	Graham Kierath	9,686	46.6	−10.0
Labor	Jane van den Herik	5,847	28.2	−6.2
Independent	Margot Ross	3,583	17.3	+17.3
Democrats	Eric Speed	1,083	5.2	−0.2
Independent	Abraham Lynx	570	2.7	+2.7
Total formal votes		20,769	96.2	−0.6
Informal votes		823	3.8	+0.6
Turnout		21,592	91.6	
Two-party-preferred result
Liberal	Graham Kierath	11,746	56.7	−4.2
Labor	Jane van den Herik	8,957	43.3	+4.2
Liberal hold		Swing	−4.2	

=== Rockingham ===
1996 Western Australian state election: Rockingham
Party	Candidate	Votes	%	±%
Labor	Mark McGowan	9,759	48.5	+3.3
Liberal	Rob Brown	7,029	34.9	+8.8
Greens	Bob Goodale	1,211	6.0	+2.4
Democrats	Barbara Edwards	821	4.1	+2.2
	Mal McFetridge	681	3.4	+3.4
Independent	Arthur Galletly	420	2.1	+0.8
	Frans Schutte	195	1.0	+1.0
Total formal votes		20,116	95.7	+0.2
Informal votes		895	4.3	−0.2
Turnout		21,011	91.0	
Two-party-preferred result
Labor	Mark McGowan	11,531	57.5	+3.4
Liberal	Rob Brown	8,530	42.5	3.4
Labor hold		Swing	+3.4	

=== Roe ===
1996 Western Australian state election: Roe
Party	Candidate	Votes	%	±%
National	Ross Ainsworth	6,286	53.6	0.0
Independent	Lance Shearer	2,304	19.6	+19.6
Independent	Lesley Parker	1,927	16.4	+16.4
Labor	June Belton	1,217	10.4	−5.7
Total formal votes		11,734	97.7	+1.0
Informal votes		281	2.3	−1.0
Turnout		12,015	91.5	
Two-party-preferred result
National	Ross Ainsworth	9,709	82.8	+0.8
Labor	June Belton	2,011	17.2	−0.8
Two-candidate-preferred result
National	Ross Ainsworth	7,265	62.0	−20.0
Independent	Lance Shearer	4,459	38.0	+38.0
National hold		Swing	−20.0	

=== Roleystone ===
1996 Western Australian state election: Roleystone
Party	Candidate	Votes	%	±%
Liberal	Fred Tubby	10,164	48.3	−0.1
Labor	Tom Hoyer	6,902	32.8	−4.4
Greens	Catherine Hall	2,215	10.5	+7.9
Democrats	Tony Bloomer	1,742	8.3	+5.6
Total formal votes		21,023	94.9	−0.5
Informal votes		1,125	5.1	+0.5
Turnout		22,148	91.1	
Two-party-preferred result
Liberal	Fred Tubby	11,994	57.2	+1.7
Labor	Tom Hoyer	8,960	42.8	−1.7
Liberal hold		Swing	+1.7	

=== South Perth ===
1996 Western Australian state election: South Perth
Party	Candidate	Votes	%	±%
Independent	Phillip Pendal	8,058	39.6	+39.6
Liberal	Peter Spencer	6,764	33.3	−24.8
Labor	Kim Bryant	4,031	19.8	+17.3
Greens	Andrew Thomson	1,473	7.2	−1.4
Total formal votes		20,326	97.4	+1.5
Informal votes		553	2.6	−1.5
Turnout		20,879	88.0	
Two-candidate-preferred result
Independent	Phillip Pendal	13,045	64.2	+64.2
Liberal	Peter Spencer	7,270	35.8	−30.8
Independent gain from Liberal		Swing	+64.2	

=== Southern River ===
1996 Western Australian state election: Southern River
Party	Candidate	Votes	%	±%
Liberal	Monica Holmes	9,528	43.6	+1.2
Labor	Judyth Watson	8,912	40.8	−6.1
Independent	Tim Dowsett	1,449	6.6	+6.6
Democrats	Celia Dines	1,226	5.6	+2.5
Call to Australia	Michelle Shave	733	3.4	+3.4
Total formal votes		21,848	95.2	−0.7
Informal votes		1,111	4.8	+0.7
Turnout		22,959	92.0	
Two-party-preferred result
Liberal	Monica Holmes	11,234	51.5	+4.1
Labor	Judyth Watson	10,574	48.5	−4.1
Liberal gain from Labor		Swing	+4.1	

=== Stirling ===
1996 Western Australian state election: Stirling
Party	Candidate	Votes	%	±%
National	Monty House	7,569	66.7	+15.5
Labor	Barry Christy	1,870	16.5	+0.3
Greens	Paul Llewellyn	1,436	12.7	+5.5
Democrats	Gaida Neggo	469	4.1	+2.4
Total formal votes		11,344	96.4	−0.7
Informal votes		425	3.6	+0.7
Turnout		11,769	91.8	
Two-party-preferred result
National	Monty House	8,395	74.1	−3.1
Labor	Barry Christy	2,932	25.9	+3.1
National hold		Swing	−3.1	

=== Swan Hills ===
1996 Western Australian state election: Swan Hills
Party	Candidate	Votes	%	±%
Liberal	June van de Klashorst	10,756	51.2	+5.6
Labor	Peter Murray	5,701	27.1	−3.6
Greens	Kathryn Driver	2,266	10.8	+4.2
Democrats	Bobbie Moxham	1,696	8.1	+4.3
Reform	David Gunnyon	589	2.8	+2.8
Total formal votes		21,008	96.1	+0.1
Informal votes		862	3.9	−0.1
Turnout		21,870	91.7	
Two-party-preferred result
Liberal	June van de Klashorst	12,505	59.7	+0.2
Labor	Peter Murray	8,430	40.3	−0.2
Liberal hold		Swing	+0.2	

=== Thornlie ===
1996 Western Australian state election: Thornlie
Party	Candidate	Votes	%	±%
Liberal	Brian Brand	9,077	43.1	+0.1
Labor	Sheila McHale	8,853	42.1	−6.1
Greens	Rebecca Byrne	1,602	7.6	+5.9
Democrats	Charlton Bailey	1,514	7.2	+4.2
Total formal votes		21,046	94.7	−1.0
Informal votes		1,174	5.3	+1.0
Turnout		22,220	91.6	
Two-party-preferred result
Labor	Sheila McHale	10,815	51.5	−1.2
Liberal	Brian Brand	10,191	48.5	+1.2
Labor hold		Swing	−1.2	

=== Vasse ===
1996 Western Australian state election: Vasse
Party	Candidate	Votes	%	±%
Liberal	Bernie Masters	5,433	43.2	−14.9
National	Beryle Morgan	2,917	23.2	+14.0
Labor	Linda Mullins	2,097	16.7	−5.5
Independent	Mike Sully	1,261	10.0	+10.0
Democrats	Alf Denman	451	3.6	+2.9
Independent	Ron Palmer	413	3.3	+3.3
Total formal votes		12,572	96.4	−0.3
Informal votes		476	3.6	+0.3
Turnout		13,048	92.1	
Two-party-preferred result
Liberal	Bernie Masters	8,745	69.7	−0.6
Labor	Linda Mullins	3,802	30.3	+0.6
Two-candidate-preferred result
Liberal	Bernie Masters	7,424	59.2	−11.1
National	Beryle Morgan	5,116	40.8	+40.8
Liberal hold		Swing	−11.1	

=== Victoria Park ===
1996 Western Australian state election: Victoria Park
Party	Candidate	Votes	%	±%
Labor	Geoff Gallop	9,725	47.7	+0.8
Liberal	Bruce Stevenson	7,313	35.9	−4.2
Greens	Phil Farren	1,289	6.3	+0.4
Democrats	Anne Millar	1,042	5.1	+2.3
Independent	John Collins	1,015	5.0	+5.0
Total formal votes		20,384	95.5	+0.3
Informal votes		963	4.5	−0.3
Turnout		21,347	88.4	
Two-party-preferred result
Labor	Geoff Gallop	11,756	57.8	+3.0
Liberal	Bruce Stevenson	8,570	42.2	−3.0
Labor hold		Swing	+3.0	

=== Wagin ===
1996 Western Australian state election: Wagin
Party	Candidate	Votes	%	±%
National	Bob Wiese	8,749	74.3	−1.3
Labor	Phil Hogan	2,213	18.8	+17.7
Citizens Electoral Council	Jean Robinson	819	7.0	+7.0
Total formal votes		11,781	96.6	+0.5
Informal votes		412	3.4	−0.5
Turnout		12,193	92.0	
Two-party-preferred result
National	Bob Wiese	9,270	78.7	+0.5
Labor	Phil Hogan	2,504	21.3	−0.5
National hold		Swing	+0.5	

=== Wanneroo ===
1996 Western Australian state election: Wanneroo
Party	Candidate	Votes	%	±%
Liberal	Iain MacLean	11,252	44.8	+1.2
Labor	Liz Prime	10,023	39.9	−2.3
Greens	Miguel Castillo	2,011	8.0	+3.7
Democrats	Jeanette Grieves	1,815	7.2	+6.1
Total formal votes		25,101	95.2	−0.2
Informal votes		1,266	4.8	+0.2
Turnout		26,367	91.8	
Two-party-preferred result
Liberal	Iain MacLean	12,919	51.6	+0.6
Labor	Liz Prime	12,123	48.4	−0.6
Liberal hold		Swing	+0.6	

=== Warren-Blackwood ===
1996 Western Australian state election: Warren-Blackwood
Party	Candidate	Votes	%	±%
Liberal	Paul Omodei	8,033	61.8	−0.9
Labor	Nicholas Oaks	3,198	24.6	+2.2
Democrats	Sally Johnston	1,105	8.5	+8.5
Citizens Electoral Council	Tony Drake	666	5.1	+5.1
Total formal votes		13,002	96.5	−0.3
Informal votes		467	3.5	+0.3
Turnout		13,469	92.1	
Two-party-preferred result
Liberal	Paul Omodei	8,721	67.1	−2.3
Labor	Nicholas Oaks	4,276	32.9	+2.3
Liberal hold		Swing	−2.3	

=== Willagee ===
}

1996 Western Australian state election: Willagee
Party	Candidate	Votes	%	±%
Labor	Alan Carpenter	10,186	50.1	+4.4
Liberal	Tony Seman	7,466	36.7	−6.6
Greens	Eddie Speed	1,765	8.7	+4.9
Democrats	Ilse Trewin	915	4.5	+1.3
Total formal votes		20,332	95.2	+0.4
Informal votes		1,025	4.8	−0.4
Turnout		21,357	91.3	
Two-party-preferred result
Labor	Alan Carpenter	11,919	58.8	+6.8
Liberal	Tony Seman	8,367	41.2	−6.8
Labor hold		Swing	+6.8	

=== Yokine ===
1996 Western Australian state election: Yokine
Party	Candidate	Votes	%	±%
Liberal	Kim Hames	9,127	44.1	−1.0
Labor	Nick Catania	7,698	37.2	−5.7
Independent	Sam Piantadosi	1,116	5.4	+5.4
Greens	Kim Herbert	1,094	5.3	+1.1
Democrats	Margot Clifford	976	4.7	+3.0
Marijuana	Lucy Honan	674	3.3	+3.3
Total formal votes		20,685	94.8	+0.4
Informal votes		1,127	5.2	−0.2
Turnout		21,812	90.3	
Two-party-preferred result
Liberal	Kim Hames	10,987	53.2	+2.6
Labor	Nick Catania	9,663	46.8	−2.6
Liberal hold		Swing	+2.6	

== See also ==
- Results of the Western Australian state election, 1996 (Legislative Council)
- 1996 Western Australian state election
- Candidates of the Western Australian state election, 1996
- Members of the Western Australian Legislative Assembly, 1996–2001
