= Barry House =

Australian politician

The Honourable Barry House AM

17th President of the Legislative Council of Western Australia
- In office 22 May 2009 – 21 May 2017
- Preceded by: Nick Griffiths
- Succeeded by: Kate Doust

Member of the Legislative Council of Western Australia
- In office 22 May 1989 – 21 May 2017 Serving with Benson-Lidholm, Cowdell, Embry, Farina, Hallett, Holt, Jones, Llewellyn, McSweeney, Montgomery, Patterson, Sharp, Stretch, Talbot, Thomas, Wenn
- Constituency: South West Region
- In office 24 October 1987 – 21 May 1989
- Preceded by: Vic Ferry
- Succeeded by: Seat abolished
- Constituency: South-West Province

Personal details
- Born: Barry John House; 27 November 1949 (age 76) Busselton, Western Australia
- Party: Liberal
- Education: University of Western Australia

Barry John House AM (born 27 November 1949) is an Australian politician who was a Liberal Party member of the Legislative Council of Western Australia from 1987 to 2017. He was President of the Legislative Council from 2009 to 2017, and prior to entering politics worked as a schoolteacher.

== Early life ==
House was born in Busselton, Western Australia, to Molly May (née Jolliffe) and Edward Kenneth House. He attended Busselton Senior High School before going on to further study at the University of Western Australia and Nedlands Teachers College. He was also a talented cricketer, touring South Africa with an Australian schoolboys team and playing at first-grade level in the WACA district competition. After graduating, House worked as a teacher for periods at Eastern Goldfields Senior High School, Kewdale Senior High School, and Churchlands Senior High School and Busselton Senior High School. He returned to Busselton in 1979 to work as a youth education officer, and in May 1987 was elected to the Busselton Shire Council. However, he resigned only a few months later in order to enter parliament.

== Politics ==
House entered parliament at a 1987 Legislative Council by-election for South-West Province, caused by the resignation of Vic Ferry. At the 1989 state election, he was re-elected to the Legislative Council representing the new seven-member South West Region. House was subsequently included in the shadow ministry of Barry MacKinnon, and retained his place when Richard Court became party leader (and thus leader of the opposition) in 1992. However, following the Liberal Party's victory at the 1993 election, he was not made a minister, but was instead made chairman of committees in the Legislative Council, a position which he held until 1997.

After the government's defeat at the 2001 election, Colin Barnett replaced Richard Court as party leader, and included House in his shadow ministry. He would remain a shadow minister until 2008, serving under four different leaders (Barnett, Matt Birney, Paul Omodei, and Troy Buswell). When the Liberal Party returned to power at the 2008 state election, House was not included in the new ministry, but was instead made a parliamentary secretary. However, in May 2009, following the start of a new term, he was elected President of the Legislative Council, in succession to Nick Griffiths. He was re-elected to the position after the 2013 election, but in October 2015 announced that he would retire from parliament at the 2017 election.

Following his retirement from politics, he has continued to undertake various roles in the Busselton community including President of the Busselton Tennis Club, and is the current Chairman of Busselton Jetty Inc.

== Awards and honours ==
In 2021, House was awarded an honorary doctorate by Edith Cowan University, which was rescinded later that year in light of his opposition to certain LGBT rights during his political career.

== See also ==
- Members of the Western Australian Legislative Council

Western Australian Legislative Council
Preceded by Vic Ferry	Member for South-West Province; 1987-1989	Succeeded by Seat abolished
Preceded by New seat	Member for South-West Region; 1989-2017	Succeeded by Colin Tincknell
Preceded by Nick Griffiths	President of the Western Australian Legislative Council; 2009–2017	Succeeded by Kate Doust
