= Beryl Jones =

Australian politician

The Honourable Beryl Jones

Member of the Legislative Council of Western Australia
- In office 22 May 1986 – 21 May 1989
- Preceded by: Ian Pratt
- Succeeded by: None (seat abolished)
- Constituency: Lower West Province
- In office 22 May 1989 – 21 May 1993 Serving with House, Montgomery, Patterson, Stretch, Thomas, Wenn
- Constituency: South West Region

Personal details
- Born: 30 July 1932 (age 93) Bootle, Lancashire, England
- Party: Labor

Beryl Lillian Jones (née Davies; born 30 July 1932) is a former Australian politician who was a Labor Party member of the Legislative Council of Western Australia from 1986 to 1993.

Jones was born in Bootle, Lancashire, England, and after leaving school worked as a nurse. She emigrated to Australia in the 1950s, and re-trained as a schoolteacher, subsequently teaching at various high schools in the Perth metropolitan area. Jones was elected to the Town of Armadale council in 1981, and served until the 1986 state election, when she was elected to the Legislative Council's Lower West Province. She became the fifth woman from the Labor Party to serve in the Legislative Council, and the seventh overall. At the 1989 state election, all the previous constituencies were abolished, with Jones successfully transferring to the new South West Region. She retired from parliament at the 1993 state election.
