= Alan Carstairs =

Australian politician

Alan MacMillan Carstairs (born 4 May 1939) is an Australian politician. He was a Liberal Party member of the Western Australian Legislative Council from 24 December 1996 to 22 May 1997, representing North Metropolitan Region.

Carstairs was born in Kalgoorlie, and was a retired master butcher and City of Wanneroo councillor before entering politics. He contested the 1993 state election in an unwinnable position on the Liberal ticket for North Metropolitan Region, and was not elected. He then ran unsuccessfully for a Legislative Assembly seat at the 1996 state election. However, at the same election, Liberal MLC Iain MacLean, who had been above Carstairs on the Liberal ticket in 1993, contested and won the Legislative Assembly seat of Wanneroo. This necessitated a countback for the final months of MacLean's term in the Legislative Council, which did not finish until the following year, and Carstairs was elected.

In parliament, he briefly served on the Standing Committee on Estimates and Financial Operations in 1997, and provided the decisive vote in support of major industrial relations changes proposed by the Court Liberal government. As he had not contested a Legislative Council seat at the 1996 election, he left parliament at the conclusion of MacLean's term on 21 May 1997.

Carstairs ran for mayor of the City of Wanneroo in both the 1999 and 2003 local government elections, but lost to Jon Kelly both times. He was briefly touted as a possible candidate for state Liberal preselection in 2000, but never again entered state politics.
