= Adele Farina =

Australian politician

Member of the Western Australian Legislative Council for South West Region
- In office 22 May 2001 – 21 May 2021

Personal details
- Born: 31 March 1964 (age 62) Perth, Western Australia
- Party: Labor
- Education: University of Western Australia

Adele Farina (born 31 March 1964) is an Australian politician. She was a Labor Party member of the Western Australian Legislative Council from 2001 to 2021, representing South West Region. She served as parliamentary secretary to three different state ministers: the Minister for Planning and Infrastructure, Minister for Indigenous Affairs, Tourism, Culture and the Arts, and Minister for Disability Services, Citizenship, Multicultural Interests and Women's Interests.

== Early career ==
Farina was born in Perth, and studied arts and law at the University of Western Australia. She was subsequently employed as the private secretary to Bob Pearce, Environment Minister in the Lawrence government, but this ended abruptly in 1992, when she was charged by police with stealing $3,280 worth of postage stamps from the state. The trial lasted four days, but was terminated when the jury could not reach a verdict. The charges were subsequently dropped when the Director of Public Prosecutions decided that there was no reasonable prospect of securing a conviction, but the case made headlines when Pearce was charged – and subsequently convicted – on contempt of court charges for comments made in support of Farina during the trial. Farina returned to the law after the trial and was subsequently admitted to the bar.

== Political career ==
=== Local politics ===
Farina became involved in local politics in the late 1990s, and was serving as the deputy mayor of Bayswater when she began to be raised as a possible candidate to replace retiring MLA Diana Warnock in the seat of Perth for the 2001 state election. She won the support of the dominant unions in her centre faction, and was tipped to win preselection. However, she lost out to rival John Hyde when factional bosses became concerned that selecting Farina could heighten tensions already evident after a failed preselection challenge to John D'Orazio in Ballajura and potentially split the faction in two.

=== Legislative Council ===
After losing the Perth contest, Farina was instead nominated as a candidate for South West Province in the Legislative Council. This caused significant anger in local branches, as Farina had no ties to the regional electorate, and David Smith, a minister in the Dowding and Lawrence governments, quit the party in disgust. She nevertheless took the second position on the Labor ticket in the province and had little difficulty being elected to the Legislative Council.

In her first term as a member of the Legislative Council, Farina often acted as a spokesperson for government policy in the region, but rarely spoke in parliament. In her first fifteen months in the Legislative Council, Farina only made one speech – her maiden speech – and apart from five Dorothy Dixers and nine estimates committee questions, did not speak at all, which earned her some criticism from the media as one of the quietest MPs in the parliament.

In September 2004, during a debate on a proposed domestic violence law, Farina revealed that she had been stalked for ten years during the 1990s. She stated that it had escalated severely when she was nominated for preselection, which forced her to complain to the police, ultimately leading to the arrest of the culprit. Farina had requested that he only be charged with a summary offence to avoid the publicity of a full trial, and he was subsequently found guilty of stalking.

Farina contested the 2005 state election atop the Labor ticket, and after the election was promoted to the position of parliamentary secretary. She lost one of her portfolios to Peter Watson in November 2005, but picked up another in a reshuffle in March 2006. She has repeatedly been touted as a potential Cabinet minister, although she was overlooked in the reshuffle that followed the resignation of Premier Geoff Gallop in March 2006 and again when John D'Orazio was forced to resign from Cabinet in May 2006. Most recently, as of May 2006, Farina has been heavily involved with a project aimed at reducing negative effects associated with leavers' week in her region. She was re-elected in the 2008, 2013 and 2017 state elections but held no position in the ALP ministry or shadow ministry.
