= Diane Airey =

Australian politician (born 1943)

Diane Phyllis Airey (born 4 February 1943) is a former Australian politician.

Airey was born in Perth. She was appointed to the Western Australian Legislative Council in February 1993 to replace Phillip Pendal, who had resigned to contest the Legislative Assembly. She served as a Liberal MLC until May, when she did not contest the state election. She never assumed her seat on the Council since Parliament did not sit during her tenure.
