= Muriel Patterson =

Australian politician

The Honourable Muriel Patterson OAM

Member of the Legislative Council of Western Australia
- In office 22 May 1989 – 21 May 2001 Serving with Cowdell, House, Jones, Montgomery, Sharp, Stretch, Thomas, Wenn
- Constituency: South West Region

Personal details
- Born: Muriel Grace Quartermaine; 20 September 1931 (age 94) Katanning, Western Australia, Australia
- Party: Liberal

Muriel Grace Patterson OAM (née Quartermaine; born 20 September 1931) is a former Australian politician who served as a Liberal Party member of the Legislative Council of Western Australia from 1989 to 2001, representing South West Region. She was a farmer and small-business owner before entering politics.

== Early life ==
Patterson was born in Katanning, Western Australia, to Grace Gertrude (née Harris) and Charles Lewis Quartermaine. She attended a state school in Woodanilling and later studied at Perth Technical College as an external student. In 1964, Patterson and her husband began farming at Tambellup, on what had previously been virgin bushland. She opened a craft-supply store in Albany in 1976, and eventually became the first female president of the local chamber of commerce. Patterson served on the state council of the Western Australian Chamber of Commerce and Industry from 1984 to 1988, including on the state executive from 1987 to 1988, where she was the first female member.

== Politics ==
Patterson joined the Liberal Party in 1980, and served as president of the Albany branch from 1984 to 1987. At the 1989 state election, she ran in second place on the party's ticket in South West Region, and was elected to a term beginning in May 1989. Patterson was made deputy chairman of committees soon after entering parliament, and in May 1992 was also included in the shadow cabinet of Richard Court. However, she was not promoted to the ministry when the Liberal Party won the 1993 state election, instead being made government whip. Patterson remained a whip until her retirement at the 2001 state election.

She was awarded the Medal of the Order of Australia in the 2023 King's Birthday Honours for service to the Parliament of Western Australia.

== See also ==
- Women in the Western Australian Legislative Council
