= Sally Talbot =

Australian politician (born 1953)

The Honourable Dr. Sally Talbot MLC

Member of the Western Australian Legislative Council for South West Region
- In office 22 May 2005 – 21 May 2025

Personal details
- Born: Sally Elizabeth Talbot; 22 March 1953 (age 73) London, England, UK
- Party: Labor
- Spouse: Jon Ford
- Domestic partner: Hon. Wendy Frances Fatin
- Children: David Talbot
- Education: Royal College of Music; Murdoch University
- Profession: ALP State secretary (WA), university lecturer and musician

Sally Elizabeth Talbot (born 22 March 1953) is an Australian politician. She was a Labor Party member of the Western Australian Legislative Council from 2005 to 2025, representing the region of South West.

In July 2024, she announced her retirement from politics.

== Biography ==
Talbot came from a family active in the British Labour Party where politics was actively discussed and engaged in. At 16 she finished her secondary schooling and attended the Royal College of Music in London, specialising in the cello. She spent the next 15 years working as a musician, however she said her life always turned back to her interest in politics.

While attending Murdoch University in Perth in 1983, she joined the staff as a federal member of parliament, her first formal job in politics. In 2001 she became the Assistant Secretary of the Labor Party, a position she held until 2005. It was in this role that she discovered the importance of engaging ordinary citizens in politics to create a better community, thus it was important to have active and healthy political parties. She left her staff role with the party to become a member of parliament, and later as the first President of the Western Australian branch of the Labor Party to be elected by popular ballot in 2008.

Her doctorate in philosophy from Murdoch University was published, "Partial Reason: Critical and Constructive Transformations of Ethics and Epistemology".

== Personal life ==
Talbot was in a relationship with Wendy Fatin, a retired federal politician; a son David was born into their relationship in 1986. She has since married Jon Ford, a former Minister in the Gallop and Carpenter governments and they live in Denmark, Western Australia.
