= Nigel Hallett =

Australian politician

Member of the Western Australian Legislative Council for South West Region
- In office 22 May 2005 – 21 May 2017

Personal details
- Born: 6 February 1953 (age 73) Bridgetown, Western Australia
- Party: Shooters, Fishers and Farmers (2016–present)
- Other party: Liberal (until 2016)
- Spouse: Susan
- Children: Two
- Profession: Farmer

Nigel Charles Hallett (born 6 February 1953) is an Australian politician. He was a member of the Western Australian Legislative Council representing the South West Region from 2005 to 2017. Elected to Parliament in the 2005 state election he was a member of the Liberal Party until 16 June 2016, when he announced he was resigning from the Liberal Party and joining the Shooters, Fishers and Farmers Party, he represented at the 2017 election. He was not re-elected.

Hallett completed his early education in Bridgetown but completed high school education at Hampton Senior High School in Perth.

He is married to Susan Hallett and they have two sons; Ian and Michael.

In 2020 the Western Australian Corruption and Crime Commission found that Hallett improperly employed his girlfriend in his office, despite her not doing any meaningful work. He was also found to have engaged in serious misconduct in using his electorate allowance to fund personal lifestyle expenses, including expensive dinners and visits to strip clubs.
