= South West Region (Western Australia) =

Electoral region of Western Australia

South West Region Western Australia—Legislative Council
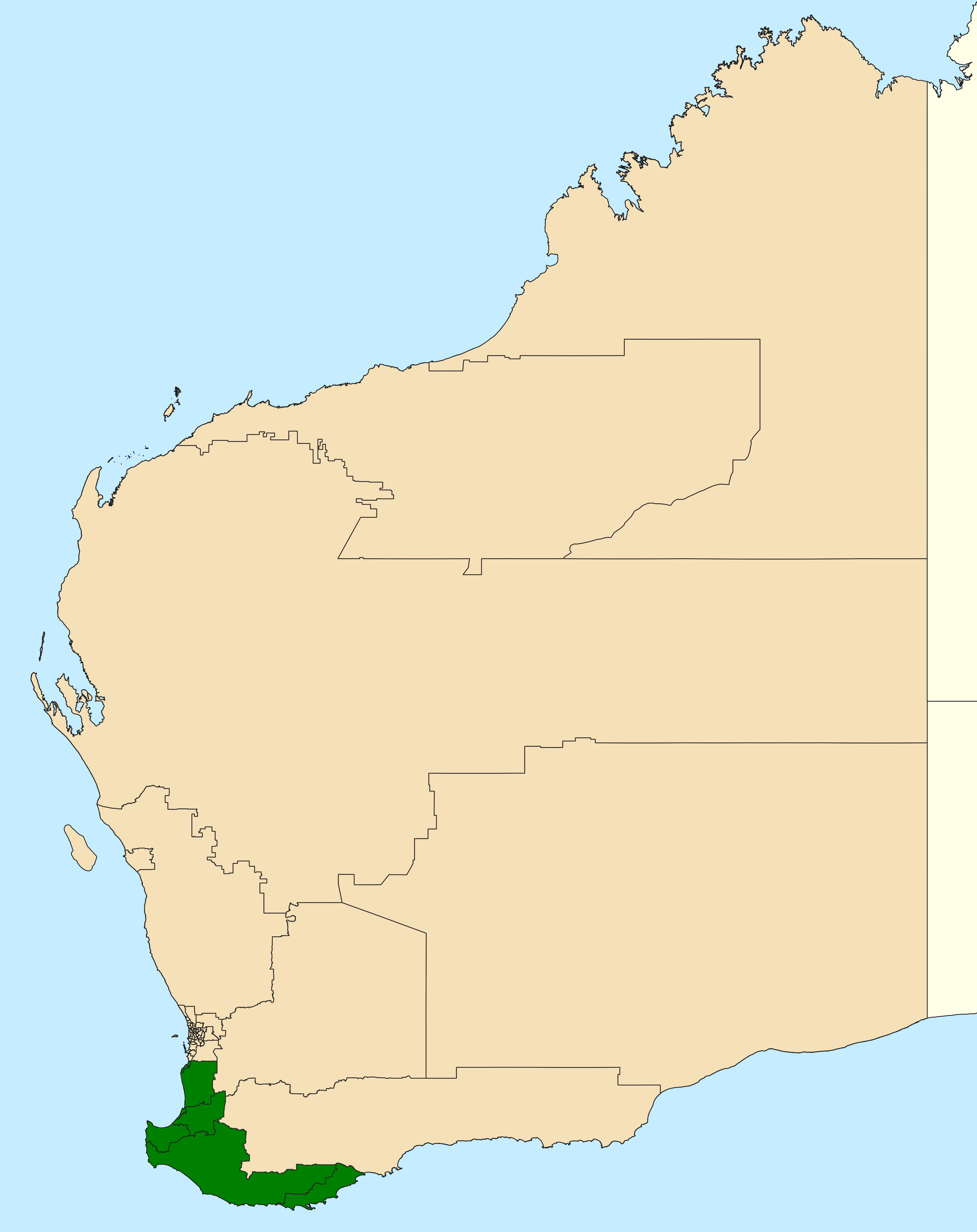
- Location of the South West Region
- State: Western Australia
- Dates current: 1989–2025
- Electors: 242,983 (2021)
- Area: 38,592 km^{2} (14,900.5 sq mi)
- Demographic: Regional

The South West Region was a multi-member electoral region of the Western Australian Legislative Council the South West, Peel and part of the Great Southern regions of the state. It was created by the Acts Amendment (Electoral Reform) Act 1987, and became effective on 22 May 1989 with seven members who had been elected at the 1989 state election three months earlier. At the 2008 election, it was reduced to six members. The region included the cities of Albany, Bunbury and Mandurah.

The region, along with all other Western Australian Electoral Regions, was abolished in time with the 2025 state election, following legislation passed in November 2021 to create a single, state-wide constituency of 37 members.

== Geography ==
The Region was made up of several complete Legislative Assembly districts, which changed at each distribution.

Redistribution	Period	Electoral districts	Electors	% of state electors	Area
29 April 1988	22 May 1989 – 22 May 1997	Albany, Bunbury, Collie, Mandurah, Mitchell, Murray, Stirling, Vasse, Warren, Wellington (10)	99,510	10.94%	43,659 km^{2} (16,857 sq mi)
28 November 1994	22 May 1997 – 22 May 2005	Albany, Bunbury, Collie, Dawesville, Mandurah, Mitchell, Murray-Wellington, Stirling, Vasse, Warren-Blackwood (10)	121,408	11.74%	43,659 km^{2} (16,857 sq mi)
4 August 2003	22 May 2005 – 22 May 2009	Albany, Bunbury, Capel, Collie-Wellington, Dawesville, Leschenault, Mandurah, Murray, Stirling, Vasse, Warren-Blackwood (11)	152,494	12.55%	37,493 km^{2} (14,476 sq mi)
29 October 2007	22 May 2009 – 22 May 2017	Albany, Blackwood-Stirling, Bunbury, Collie-Preston, Dawesville, Mandurah, Murray-Wellington, Vasse (8)	167,871	13.33%	41,008 km^{2} (15,833 sq mi)
27 November 2015	22 May 2017 – 22 May 2021	Albany, Bunbury, Collie-Preston, Dawesville, Mandurah, Murray-Wellington, Vasse, Warren-Blackwood (8)	226,051	14.19%	45,079 km^{2} (17,405 sq mi)
27 November 2019	22 May 2021 – 22 May 2025	As per 2015	242,983	14.15%	38,592 km^{2} (14,900 sq mi)

== Representation ==
=== Distribution of seats ===
As 7-member seat:

Election	Seats won
1989–1993	
1993–1997	
1997–2001	
2001–2005	
2005–2009	

As 6-member seat:

Election	Seats won
2009–2013	
2013–2017	
2017–2021	
2021–2025	

Legend:

Labor
Liberal
National
Greens WA
One Nation
Legalise Cannabis

=== Members ===
Since its creation, the electorate had 17 members. Four of these members had previously been members of the Legislative Council—Beryl Jones (Lower West Province), Bill Stretch (Lower Central Province), Doug Wenn and Barry House (both South West Province).

Members for South West Region
Year	Member	Party	Member	Party	Member	Party	Member	Party	Member	Party	Member	Party	Member	Party
1989	Beryl Jones	Labor	Bob Thomas	Labor	Doug Wenn	Labor	Bill Stretch	Liberal	Muriel Patterson	Liberal	Barry House	Liberal	Murray Montgomery	Nationals
1993	John Cowdell	Labor	Bob Thomas	Labor	Doug Wenn	Labor	Bill Stretch	Liberal	Muriel Patterson	Liberal	Barry House	Liberal	Murray Montgomery	Nationals
1996	John Cowdell	Labor	Bob Thomas	Labor	Chrissy Sharp	Greens	Bill Stretch	Liberal	Muriel Patterson	Liberal	Barry House	Liberal	Murray Montgomery	Nationals
2001	John Cowdell	Labor	Adele Farina	Labor	Chrissy Sharp	Greens	Bill Stretch	Liberal	Robyn McSweeney	Liberal	Barry House	Liberal	Paddy Embry	One Nation
2003	John Cowdell	Labor	Adele Farina	Labor	Chrissy Sharp	Greens	Bill Stretch	Liberal	Robyn McSweeney	Liberal	Barry House	Liberal	Paddy Embry	New Country
2005	Sally Talbot	Labor	Adele Farina	Labor	Matt Benson-Lidholm	Labor	Nigel Hallett	Liberal	Robyn McSweeney	Liberal	Barry House	Liberal	Paul Llewellyn	Greens
2008	Sally Talbot	Labor	Adele Farina	Labor	Colin Holt	Nationals	Nigel Hallett	Liberal	Robyn McSweeney	Liberal	Barry House	Liberal		
2013	Sally Talbot	Labor	Adele Farina	Labor	Colin Holt	Nationals	Nigel Hallett	Liberal	Robyn McSweeney	Liberal	Barry House	Liberal		
2016	Sally Talbot	Labor	Adele Farina	Labor	Colin Holt	Nationals	Nigel Hallett	Shooters, Fishers, Farmers	Robyn McSweeney	Liberal	Barry House	Liberal		
2017	Sally Talbot	Labor	Adele Farina	Labor	Colin Holt	Nationals	Diane Evers	Greens	Steve Thomas	Liberal	Colin Tincknell	One Nation		
2021	Sally Talbot	Labor	Alannah MacTiernan	Labor	Jackie Jarvis	Labor	Sophia Moermond	Legalise Cannabis	Steve Thomas	Liberal	James Hayward	Nationals		
2021	Sally Talbot	Labor	Alannah MacTiernan	Labor	Jackie Jarvis	Labor	Sophia Moermond	Legalise Cannabis	Steve Thomas	Liberal	James Hayward	Independent		
2023a	Sally Talbot	Labor	Ben Dawkins	Independent Labor	Jackie Jarvis	Labor	Sophia Moermond	Legalise Cannabis	Steve Thomas	Liberal	James Hayward	Independent		
2023b	Sally Talbot	Labor	Ben Dawkins	Independent	Jackie Jarvis	Labor	Sophia Moermond	Legalise Cannabis	Steve Thomas	Liberal	Louise Kingston	Nationals		
2024a	Sally Talbot	Labor	Ben Dawkins	Independent	Jackie Jarvis	Labor	Sophia Moermond	Independent	Steve Thomas	Liberal	Louise Kingston	Nationals		
2024b	Sally Talbot	Labor	Ben Dawkins	Independent	Jackie Jarvis	Labor	Sophia Moermond	Independent	Steve Thomas	Liberal	Louise Kingston	Independent		

== Election results ==
2021 Western Australian state election: South West
Party	Candidate	Votes	%	±%
Quota		29,300		
Labor	1. Sally Talbot (elected 1); 2. Alannah MacTiernan (elected 3); 3. Jackie Jarvis (elected 4); 4. John Mondy; 5. Ben Dawkins; 6. Kylie Fitzgerald	114,713	55.93	+19.49
Liberal	1. Steve Thomas (elected 2); 2. Greg Stocks; 3. Anita Shortland; 4. Hayden Burbidge	37,736	18.40	−4.28
National	1. James Hayward (elected 6); 2. Louise Kingston; 3. Rod Pfeiffer	12,254	5.97	−6.06
Greens	1. Diane Evers; 2. Donald Clarke; 3. Jodie Moffat	12,220	5.96	−1.62
Shooters, Fishers, Farmers	1. Rick Mazza; 2. Russell McCarthy; 3. Ray Hull	5,178	2.52	−1.59
Legalise Cannabis	1. Sophia Moermond (elected 5); 2. Nicola Johnson	4,531	2.21	+2.21
One Nation	1. Colin Tincknell; 2. Paul Howard; 3. Michael Pelle	3,841	1.87	−8.76
Christians	1. Laurence Van der Plas; 2. Joan Albany	3,782	1.84	+0.15
No Mandatory Vaccination	1. Keith Bunton; 2. Elisabeth Bluntschli	2,504	1.22	+1.22
Liberal Democrats	1. Eli Bernstein; 2. David Fishlock	2,014	0.98	+0.03
Western Australia	1. Terri Sharp; 2. Joanne Munro	1,420	0.69	+0.55
Sustainable Australia	1. Daniel Minson; 2. Heather Scott	904	0.44	+0.44
WAxit	1. Chas Hopkins; 2. Malcolm Gilmour	810	0.39	+0.20
Animal Justice	1. Vicki Bailey; 2. Sarah Gould	798	0.39	−0.40
Health Australia	1. Justin Zwartkruis; 2. Hayley Green	493	0.24	+0.24
Great Australian	1. Nick Robinson; 2. Andy Gleeson	461	0.22	+0.22
Liberals for Climate	1. Mark Bentley; 2. Pieter Lottering	410	0.20	−0.23
Daylight Saving	1. Garry Spiers; 2. Lizabeth Taylor	283	0.14	−0.22
Independent	1. Yasmin Bartlett; 2. Karen Perttula	242	0.12	+0.12
Independent	Dave Schumacher	170	0.08	+0.08
Independent	1. George Seth; 2. Noel Avery	145	0.07	+0.07
Independent	1. John Banks; 2. Phillip Spencer	101	0.05	+0.05
Independent	Bob Burdett	89	0.04	+0.04
Total formal votes		205,099	97.92	+0.83
Informal votes		4,357	2.08	−0.83
Turnout		209,456	86.20	−1.00
