= John Cowdell =

Australian politician

John Cowdell AM

15th President of the Western Australian Legislative Council
- In office 22 May 2001 – 21 May 2005
- Preceded by: George Cash
- Succeeded by: Nick Griffiths

Member of the Western Australian Legislative Council for South-West Region
- In office 22 May 1993 – 21 May 2005
- Preceded by: Beryl Jones
- Succeeded by: Sally Talbot

Personal details
- Born: 24 May 1953 (age 73) South Perth, Western Australia
- Party: Labor
- Education: University of Western Australia

John Alexander Cowdell AM (born 24 May 1953) is a former Australian politician.

Born in Perth, Cowdell holds a Bachelor of Arts and a Diploma of Education. He worked as a public servant and adviser to Kim Beazley before being appointed Assistant Secretary of the Western Australian Labor Party; he was also Dean of Kingswood College at the University of Western Australia. In 1993 he was elected to the Western Australian Legislative Council for South West. From 1997 to 2001 he was Shadow Minister for Parliamentary and Electoral Affairs as well as Deputy President of the Council; in 2001 he became President. Cowdell retired from politics in 2005.

== Awards and recognition ==
Cowdell was awarded a Centenary Medal in 2001. He was appointed a Member of the Order of Australia (AM) in the 2010 Australia Day Honours "For service to the Parliament of Western Australia, to regional development, and to the community, particularly through contributions to history and heritage".

Western Australian Legislative Council
| Preceded by Beryl Jones | Member for South-West Region; 1993-2005 | Succeeded by Sally Talbot |
| Preceded by George Cash | President of the Western Australian Legislative Council; 2001–2005 | Succeeded by Nick Griffiths |
