= Nick Griffiths =

Australian politician (1951–2025)

The Honourable Nick Griffiths OAM

16th President of the Western Australian Legislative Council
- In office 24 May 2005 – 21 May 2009
- Preceded by: John Cowdell
- Succeeded by: Barry House

Member of the Western Australian Legislative Council for East Metropolitan Region
- In office 22 May 1993 – 21 May 2009
- Preceded by: Fred McKenzie
- Succeeded by: Jock Ferguson

Personal details
- Born: 24 December 1951 Barry, Wales
- Died: 14 November 2025 (aged 73)
- Party: Labor Party
- Spouse(s): Rhonda Francis Thomson (m. 1975, divorced) Tracie Lynn Wilson (née Horter) (m. 2008)
- Children: 4
- Education: LL.B.
- Alma mater: University of Western Australia
- Profession: Barrister and solicitor

Nicholas David Griffiths OAM (24 December 1951 – 14 November 2025) was an Australian politician. He was a member of the Western Australian Legislative Council representing the East Metropolitan Region.

== Life and career ==
Griffiths was born in Barry, Wales on 24 December 1951. Elected to Parliament in the 1993 state election and subsequently re-elected in the 1996, 2001 and 2005 state elections, he was a member of the Labor Party. The Griffiths family emigrated to Western Australia in 1958.

He held several ministerial positions after entering parliament including: Shadow Attorney-General (1996–1999), Minister of Racing and Gaming (2001–2005) and Minister of Housing and Works (2003–2005). Following the 2005 election, he was elected as President of the Western Australian Legislative Council, a post which he held until 21 May 2009.

Griffiths was awarded a Medal of the Order of Australia (OAM) in the 2018 Australia Day Honours, "For service to the people and Parliament of Western Australia."

Griffiths died on 14 November 2025, at the age of 73.

Western Australian Legislative Council
Preceded by Fred McKenzie	Member for East Metropolitan Region; 1993–2009	Succeeded by Jock Ferguson
Preceded by John Cowdell	President of the Western Australian Legislative Council; 2005–2009	Succeeded by Barry House
