= Murray Nixon =

Australian politician

Murray Davidson Nixon is a former Australian politician.

Born in Perth, Nixon was a farmer before entering politics. In 1993 he was elected to the Western Australian Legislative Council as a Liberal member representing Agricultural region. He was re-elected in 1996 but defeated in 2001. In retirement Nixon lives in Wembley, Western Australia. He received the Medal of the Order of Australia (OAM) in the 2016 Australia Day Honours for "service to the Parliament, to the agricultural sector, and to the community, of Western Australia".
