= Doug Wenn =

Australian politician (1948–2022)

Douglas William Wenn (3 May 1948 – 8 November 2022) was an Australian politician.

Born in Bunbury, Western Australia to waterside worker John Douglas Wenn and Phyllis (née) Gilders. At the age of 13 He left school in 1962 to become a painter and decorator, and was later a technical assistant with then PMG and later Telecom Australia from 1964 to 1970. He joined the Australian Labor Party (Western Australian Branch) 1981, and in 1986 was elected to the Western Australian Legislative Council for South-West Province (Western Australia) the first Labor member for the Province in one hundred years of the province held by the Country Liberal Government of time He served until 1997, when having resigned from the Labor Party 12 Months Prior did no re contest the seat; he subsequently served on City of Bunbury City Council from 1997 to 1999 and from 2003 to 2007. Has been actively involved in many community organisation in Bunbury since.

He died in November 2022, aged 74.
