= Murray Montgomery =

Australian politician

Murray Scott Montgomery AM (born 15 January 1943) is a former Australian politician.

He was born at Mount Barker and was a farmer before entering politics. In 1989 he was elected to the Western Australian Legislative Council as a National member for South West. From 1989 to 1992 he was party spokesman on Sport and Recreation, Youth and South West, and from 1992 to 1993 spoke on Sport and Recreation for the Coalition. From 1993 he was Deputy Chairman of Committees. Montgomery retired from politics in 2001. He was appointed a Member of the Order of Australia in the 2021 Queen's Birthday Honours.
