= Bob Thomas (Australian politician) =

Australian politician

Robert John Thomas (17 October 1954 – 12 December 2016) was an Australian politician.

He was born in Sydney but arrived in Western Australia in 1955. He worked as a clerk before entering politics. In 1989 he was elected to the Western Australian Legislative Council as a Labor member for South West. He was Opposition Whip from 1997 until his retirement in 2001.
