= Bill Stretch =

Australian politician

William Noel Stretch (born 17 March 1935) is a former Australian politician.

He was born in Ballarat and arrived in Western Australia in 1954. He farmed at Mobrup before entering politics. In 1983 he was elected to the Western Australian Legislative Council as a Liberal member for Lower Central Province; following the reconstitution of the Council in 1989 he was one of the members for South West. From March to December 1986 he served as Shadow Minister for Agriculture, Conservation and Land Management, and from 1989 to 1992 he was Secretary to the Shadow Cabinet. He was Deputy Chairman of Committees from 1993 to 2001. Stretch retired from politics in 2005.
