= Electoral results for the district of Fremantle =

Western Australian district election results

This is a list of electoral results for the electoral district of Fremantle in Western Australian state elections.

== Members for Fremantle ==
Member	Party	Term
William Marmion	Ministerialist	1890–1896
John Higham	Ministerialist	1896–1904
Ted Needham	Labor	1904–1905
James Price	Ministerialist	1905–1910
William Murphy	Ministerialist	1910–1911
William Carpenter	Labor	1911–1917
William Carpenter	National Labor	1917
Walter Jones	Labor	1917–1921
Frank Gibson	Nationalist	1921–1924
Joseph Sleeman	Labor	1924–1959
Harry Fletcher	Labor	1959–1977
John Troy	Labor	1977–1980
David Parker	Labor	1980–1990
Jim McGinty	Labor	1990–2009
Adele Carles	Greens WA	2009–2010
Adele Carles	Independent	2010–2013
Simone McGurk	Labor	2013–present

== Election results ==
=== Elections in the 2020s ===
2025 Western Australian state election: Fremantle
Party	Candidate	Votes	%	±%
Labor	Simone McGurk	8,418	33.6	−21.8
Independent	Kate Hulett	6,411	25.6	+25.6
Liberal	Serena Kipling	4,709	18.8	+2.5
Greens	Felicity Townsend	3,983	15.9	−4.4
Legalise Cannabis	Dave Foley	596	2.4	+2.4
Animal Justice	Natashia Boland	399	1.6	+1.6
Christians	Peter Watt	344	1.4	+1.4
Shooters, Fishers, Farmers	Nicoletta Raffaelli	217	0.9	+0.9
Total formal votes		25,077	96.6	−0.3
Informal votes		887	3.4	+0.3
Turnout		25,964	84.7	+6.2
Two-candidate-preferred result
Labor	Simone McGurk	12,734	50.8	−13.0
Independent	Kate Hulett	12,310	49.2	+49.2
Labor hold				

2021 Western Australian state election: Fremantle
Party	Candidate	Votes	%	±%
Labor	Simone McGurk	14,646	57.3	+6.0
Greens	Liberty Cramer	4,769	18.6	+0.0
Liberal	Miquela Riley	3,837	15.0	−5.5
Socialist Alliance	Sam Wainwright	726	2.8	+0.8
No Mandatory Vaccination	W. Schulze	577	2.3	+2.3
Liberal Democrats	Carl Schelling	492	1.9	+1.9
Independent	Rod Grljusich	318	1.2	+1.2
Western Australia	Janetia Knapp	216	0.8	+0.2
Total formal votes		25,581	96.6	+1.2
Informal votes		900	3.4	−1.2
Turnout		26,481	84.5	+1.5
Notional two-party-preferred count
Labor	Simone McGurk	19,957	78.1	+5.1
Liberal	Miquela Riley	5,596	21.9	−5.1
Two-candidate-preferred result
Labor	Simone McGurk	16,800	65.7	−7.3
Greens	Liberty Cramer	8,753	34.3	+34.3
Labor hold				

=== Elections in the 2010s ===
2017 Western Australian state election: Fremantle
Party	Candidate	Votes	%	±%
Labor	Simone McGurk	12,008	51.2	+7.0
Liberal	Hayden Shenton	4,799	20.5	−8.8
Greens	Martin Spencer	4,408	18.8	−0.2
One Nation	Warren Duffy	1,004	4.3	+4.3
Socialist Alliance	Chris Jenkins	482	2.1	+2.1
Christians	Gabrielle van der Linde	453	1.9	+1.9
Matheson for WA	Janetia Knapp	160	0.7	+0.7
Micro Business	Andrew Ayre	144	0.6	+0.6
Total formal votes		23,458	95.5	+2.1
Informal votes		1,112	4.5	−2.1
Turnout		24,570	85.4	+1.1
Two-party-preferred result
Labor	Simone McGurk	17,127	73.1	+7.7
Liberal	Hayden Shenton	6,318	26.9	−7.7
Labor hold		Swing	+7.7	

2013 Western Australian state election: Fremantle
Party	Candidate	Votes	%	±%
Labor	Simone McGurk	8,249	38.2	–0.7
Liberal	Matthew Hanssen	7,760	35.9	+7.3
Greens	Andrew Sullivan	3,925	18.2	–8.5
Independent	Adele Carles	1,186	5.5	+5.5
	Sanna Andrew	252	1.2	+1.2
Independent	Jan Ter Horst	225	1.0	+1.0
Total formal votes		21,597	94.7	+0.3
Informal votes		1,219	5.3	−0.3
Turnout		22,816	88.0	
Two-party-preferred result
Labor	Simone McGurk	12,488	57.9	–4.2
Liberal	Matthew Hanssen	9,094	42.1	+4.2
Labor hold		Swing	–4.2	

=== Elections in the 2000s ===
2009 Fremantle state by-election
Party	Candidate	Votes	%	±%
Greens	Adele Carles	8,722	44.06	+16.50
Labor	Peter Tagliaferri	7,632	38.55	−0.14
Independent	Carmelo Zagami	999	5.05	+5.05
Independent	Nik Varga	701	3.54	+3.54
	Sam Wainwright	454	2.29	+2.29
Independent	Steve Boni	340	1.72	+1.72
Christian Democrats	Julie Hollett	339	1.71	−0.15
Family First	Andriette du Plessis	194	0.98	−0.71
Independent	Jan Ter Horst	188	0.95	+0.95
Independent	Rosemary Anne Lorrimar	171	0.86	+0.86
Citizens Electoral Council	Rob Totten	56	0.28	+0.28
Total formal votes		19,796	95.71	+1.38
Informal votes		888	4.29	–1.38
Turnout		20,684	87.20	+2.81
Two-candidate-preferred result
Greens	Adele Carles	10,664	53.96	+53.96
Labor	Peter Tagliaferri	9,100	46.04	−15.97
Greens gain from Labor		Swing	+53.96	

2008 Western Australian state election: Fremantle
Party	Candidate	Votes	%	±%
Labor	Jim McGinty	7,286	38.7	−5.1
Liberal	Brian Christie	5,689	30.2	+3.4
Greens	Adele Carles	5,191	27.6	+10.5
Christian Democrats	Julie Hollett	350	1.9	+0.2
Family First	Andriétte Du Plessis	318	1.7	−0.1
Total formal votes		18,834	94.3	+1.9
Informal votes		1,132	5.7	−1.9
Turnout		19,966	84.4	
Two-party-preferred result
Labor	Jim McGinty	11,667	62.0	−2.1
Liberal	Brian Christie	7,147	38.0	+2.1
Labor hold		Swing	−2.1	

2005 Western Australian state election: Fremantle
Party	Candidate	Votes	%	±%
Labor	Jim McGinty	9,803	44.9	−3.3
Liberal	Rita Scolaro	5,800	26.6	+2.4
Greens	Jim Scott	3,457	15.8	−0.7
Independent	Adele Carles	1,256	5.8	+5.8
Independent	Ian Muir	436	2.0	+2.0
Family First	Paul Thurbon	387	1.8	+1.8
Christian Democrats	Michelle Shave	359	1.6	+1.6
One Nation	Kerry-Ann Winmar	223	1.0	−4.0
Independent	Lionel Richards	111	0.5	+0.5
Total formal votes		21,832	91.7	−1.3
Informal votes		1,982	8.3	+1.3
Turnout		23,814	89.3	
Two-party-preferred result
Labor	Jim McGinty	14,043	64.4	−3.3
Liberal	Rita Scolaro	7,763	35.6	+3.3
Labor hold		Swing	−3.3	

2001 Western Australian state election: Fremantle
Party	Candidate	Votes	%	±%
Labor	Jim McGinty	9,518	47.2	+1.4
Liberal	Rita Scolaro	4,941	24.5	−8.1
Greens	Ian Alexander	3,434	17.0	+2.5
One Nation	Bob Johnston	979	4.9	+4.9
Democrats	William Hall	694	3.4	−3.7
Independent	Steve Ratcliffe	383	1.9	+1.9
Independent	Anthony Benbow	112	0.6	+0.6
Seniors Party	Fred Parker	90	0.4	+0.4
Total formal votes		20,151	92.8	−1.9
Informal votes		1,558	7.2	+1.9
Turnout		21,709	89.2	
Two-party-preferred result
Labor	Jim McGinty	13,448	67.2	+5.9
Liberal	Rita Scolaro	6,553	32.8	−5.9
Labor hold		Swing	+5.9	

=== Elections in the 1990s ===
1996 Western Australian state election: Fremantle
Party	Candidate	Votes	%	±%
Labor	Jim McGinty	9,096	45.8	−0.3
Liberal	Michael Mallis	6,479	32.6	−3.2
Greens	Elisabeth Jones	2,874	14.5	+6.0
Democrats	Corey Watts	1,420	7.1	+4.7
Total formal votes		19,869	94.7	+2.9
Informal votes		1,107	5.3	−2.9
Turnout		20,976	88.7	
Two-party-preferred result
Labor	Jim McGinty	12,153	61.3	+4.6
Liberal	Michael Mallis	7,662	38.7	−4.6
Labor hold		Swing	+4.6	

1993 Western Australian state election: Fremantle
Party	Candidate	Votes	%	±%
Labor	Jim McGinty	8,828	45.9	+3.3
Liberal	Phillip Storey	6,930	36.0	+5.7
Greens	Katherine Anketell	1,597	8.3	+8.3
Democrats	Kevin Allen	479	2.5	−2.6
	Donald De San Miguel	383	2.0	+2.0
Independent	Anthony Seman	261	1.4	+1.4
Independent	Clarrie Isaacs	247	1.3	+1.3
Independent	Patrick Mullins	207	1.1	+1.1
Independent	Fred Rieben	162	0.8	+0.8
Democratic Socialist	Geoffrey Spencer	145	0.8	+0.8
Total formal votes		19,239	91.9	+2.3
Informal votes		1,698	8.1	−2.3
Turnout		20,937	92.7	+2.9
Two-party-preferred result
Labor	Jim McGinty	10,850	56.4	−6.0
Liberal	Phillip Storey	8,389	43.6	+6.0
Labor hold		Swing	−6.0	

1990 Fremantle state by-election
Party	Candidate	Votes	%	±%
Liberal	Arthur Marshall	6,356	35.70	+5.40
Labor	Jim McGinty	6,009	33.75	−8.89
Greens	Christabel Chamarette	2,209	12.41	+7.51
	John Troy	1,652	9.58	−3.26
Independent	Pietro Tagliaferri	645	3.62	+3.62
Democrats	Peter Nettleton	293	1.65	−3.46
Independent	Philip Hooper	266	1.49	+1.49
Independent	Marie Murray	105	0.59	+0.59
Independent	Jeff Brockway	103	0.58	+0.58
Grey Power	Richard Finney	96	0.54	−3.66
Independent	Alfred Bussell	68	0.38	+0.38
Total formal votes		17,802	94.72	+5.15
Informal votes		992	5.28	−5.15
Turnout		18,794	82.46	−7.34
Two-party-preferred result
Labor	Jim McGinty	9,770	54.88	−7.53
Liberal	Arthur Marshall	8,032	45.12	+7.53
Labor hold		Swing	−7.53	

=== Elections in the 1980s ===
1989 Western Australian state election: Fremantle
Party	Candidate	Votes	%	±%
Labor	David Parker	7,556	42.6	−26.8
Liberal	Peter Cumins	5,367	30.3	−0.3
Independent	John Troy	2,276	12.8	+12.8
Democrats	Mary Druskovich	906	5.1	+5.1
Alternative Coalition	Dee Margetts	869	4.9	+4.9
Grey Power	Jack Webb	745	4.2	+4.2
Total formal votes		17,719	89.6	
Informal votes		2,063	10.4	
Turnout		19,782	89.8	
Two-party-preferred result
Labor	David Parker	11,058	62.4	−7.0
Liberal	Peter Cumins	6,661	37.6	+7.0
Labor hold		Swing	−7.0	

1986 Western Australian state election: Fremantle
Party	Candidate	Votes	%	±%
Labor	David Parker	9,784	65.0	−0.3
Liberal	Aileen Atkins	3,939	26.2	−3.5
Socialist Workers	Frank Noakes	777	5.2	+0.1
Independent	Wendy Schulze	548	3.6	+3.6
Total formal votes		15,048	95.6	+1.5
Informal votes		690	4.4	−1.5
Turnout		15,738	90.1	−1.6
Two-party-preferred result
Labor	David Parker	10,804	71.8	+2.7
Liberal	Aileen Aitkins	4,244	28.2	−2.7
Labor hold		Swing	+2.7	

1983 Western Australian state election: Fremantle
Party	Candidate	Votes	%	±%
Labor	David Parker	8,860	65.3	
Liberal	Joseph Faliti	4,030	29.7	
Socialist Labour	Timothy Peach	688	5.1	
Total formal votes		13,578	94.1	
Informal votes		843	5.9	
Turnout		14,421	91.7	
Two-party-preferred result
Labor	David Parker	9,382	69.1	
Liberal	Joseph Faliti	4,196	30.9	
Labor hold		Swing		

1980 Western Australian state election: Fremantle
Party	Candidate	Votes	%	±%
Labor	David Parker	7,739	57.5	−6.8
Liberal	James Miorada	3,978	29.5	−6.2
Socialist Labour	Angelo Lopez	766	5.7	+5.7
Independent	Christopher Mayhew	547	4.1	+4.1
Communist	Victor Slater	438	3.3	+3.3
Total formal votes		13,468	92.7	−1.6
Informal votes		1,060	7.3	+1.6
Turnout		14,528	87.0	−3.5
Two-party-preferred result
Labor	David Parker	9,097	67.5	+3.2
Liberal	James Miorada	4,371	32.5	−3.2
Labor hold		Swing	+3.2	

=== Elections in the 1970s ===
1977 Western Australian state election: Fremantle
Party	Candidate	Votes	%	±%
Labor	John Troy	9,222	64.3	
Liberal	Ernestine Rosenstein	5,124	35.7	
Total formal votes		14,346	94.3	
Informal votes		868	5.7	
Turnout		15,214	90.5	
Labor hold		Swing		

1974 Western Australian state election: Fremantle
Party	Candidate	Votes	%	±%
Labor	Harry Fletcher	8,742	65.2	
Liberal	Michael Coakley	3,802	28.3	
National Alliance	Peter Moorhouse	869	6.5	
Total formal votes		13,413	91.4	
Informal votes		1,258	8.6	
Turnout		14,671	88.6	
Two-party-preferred result
Labor	Harry Fletcher	8,872	66.1	
Liberal	Michael Coakley	4,541	33.9	
Labor hold		Swing		

1971 Western Australian state election: Fremantle
Party	Candidate	Votes	%	±%
Labor	Harry Fletcher	7,183	66.4	−7.1
Liberal	Richard Utting	2,996	27.7	+27.7
Democratic Labor	William Kenneally	639	5.9	+5.9
Total formal votes		10,818	95.1	+0.4
Informal votes		552	4.9	−0.4
Turnout		11,370	90.3	−0.4
Two-party-preferred result
Labor	Harry Fletcher	7,279	67.3	+2.3
Liberal	Richard Utting	3,539	32.7	−2.3
Labor hold		Swing	+2.3	

=== Elections in the 1960s ===
1968 Western Australian state election: Fremantle
Party	Candidate	Votes	%	±%
Labor	Harry Fletcher	7,393	73.5	
Democratic Labor	William Kenneally	2,673	26.5	
Total formal votes		10,066	94.7	
Informal votes		565	5.3	
Turnout		10,631	90.7	
Labor hold		Swing		

1965 Western Australian state election: Fremantle
Party	Candidate	Votes	%	±%
Labor	Harry Fletcher	6,647	67.4	+0.1
Liberal and Country	Ronald Shires	3,221	32.6	+1.8
Total formal votes		9,868	95.8	−1.5
Informal votes		429	4.2	+1.5
Turnout		10,297	90.7	−1.3
Labor hold		Swing	−1.6	

1962 Western Australian state election: Fremantle
Party	Candidate	Votes	%	±%
Labor	Harry Fletcher	7,005	67.3	
Liberal and Country	Charles Scampton	3,208	30.8	
Communist	George Kendrick	194	1.9	
Total formal votes		10,407	97.3	
Informal votes		286	2.7	
Turnout		10,693	92.0	
Two-party-preferred result
Labor	Harry Fletcher		69.0	
Liberal and Country	Charles Scampton		31.0	
Labor hold		Swing		

- Two party preferred vote was estimated.

=== Elections in the 1950s ===
1959 Western Australian state election: Fremantle
Party	Candidate	Votes	%	±%
Labor	Harry Fletcher	5,389	69.7	−21.5
Democratic Labor	Henry Miller	1,981	25.6	+25.6
Communist	Paddy Troy	367	4.7	−4.1
Total formal votes		7,737	95.6	−0.3
Informal votes		356	4.4	+0.3
Turnout		8,093	89.6	+0.1
Labor hold		Swing	N/A	

- Preferences were not distributed.

1956 Western Australian state election: Fremantle
Party	Candidate	Votes	%	±%
Labor	Joseph Sleeman	7,395	91.2	
Communist	Paddy Troy	714	8.8	
Total formal votes		8,109	95.9	
Informal votes		344	4.1	
Turnout		8,453	89.5	
Labor hold		Swing		

1953 Western Australian state election: Fremantle
Party	Candidate	Votes	%	±%
Labor	Joseph Sleeman	6,795	92.0	+34.2
Communist	Paddy Troy	595	8.0	+5.7
Total formal votes		7,390	94.4	−3.5
Informal votes		434	5.6	+3.5
Turnout		7,824	91.7	+1.8
Labor hold		Swing	N/A	

1950 Western Australian state election: Fremantle
Party	Candidate	Votes	%	±%
Labor	Joseph Sleeman	4,647	57.8	
Liberal and Country	Lennox Dickson	2,667	33.2	
Independent Labor	Kathleen Duff	539	6.7	
Communist	Kevin Healy	182	2.3	
Total formal votes		8,035	97.9	
Informal votes		176	2.1	
Turnout		8,211	89.9	
Two-party-preferred result
Labor	Joseph Sleeman		64.5	
Liberal and Country	Lennox Dickson		35.5	
Labor hold		Swing		

- Two party preferred vote was estimated.

=== Elections in the 1940s ===
1947 Western Australian state election: Fremantle
Party	Candidate	Votes	%	±%
Labor	Joseph Sleeman	unopposed		
Labor hold		Swing		

1943 Western Australian state election: Fremantle
Party	Candidate	Votes	%	±%
Labor	Joseph Sleeman	unopposed		
Labor hold		Swing		

=== Elections in the 1930s ===
1939 Western Australian state election: Fremantle
Party	Candidate	Votes	%	±%
Labor	Joseph Sleeman	5,288	68.1	−5.9
Nationalist	James Wilson	2,472	31.9	+5.9
Total formal votes		7,760	98.0	−0.7
Informal votes		158	2.0	+0.7
Turnout		7,918	95.8	+34.2
Labor hold		Swing	−5.9	

1936 Western Australian state election: Fremantle
Party	Candidate	Votes	%	±%
Labor	Joseph Sleeman	3,429	74.0	−26.0
Nationalist	Aidan Bryan	1,204	26.0	+26.0
Total formal votes		4,633	98.7	
Informal votes		59	1.3	
Turnout		4,692	61.6	
Labor hold		Swing	N/A	

1933 Western Australian state election: Fremantle
Party	Candidate	Votes	%	±%
Labor	Joseph Sleeman	unopposed		
Labor hold		Swing		

1930 Western Australian state election: Fremantle
Party	Candidate	Votes	%	±%
Labor	Joseph Sleeman	unopposed		
Labor hold		Swing		

=== Elections in the 1920s ===
1927 Western Australian state election: Fremantle
Party	Candidate	Votes	%	±%
Labor	Joseph Sleeman	1,867	64.3	+6.4
Nationalist	Richard Rennie	608	20.9	−21.2
Nationalist	Donald Sinclair	431	14.8	+14.8
Total formal votes		2,906	96.9	−1.5
Informal votes		94	3.1	+1.5
Turnout		3,000	79.1	+15.3
Labor hold		Swing	N/A	

- Preferences were not distributed.

1924 Western Australian state election: Fremantle
Party	Candidate	Votes	%	±%
Labor	Joseph Sleeman	1,601	57.9	+12.8
Nationalist	Frank Gibson	1,164	42.1	+6.1
Total formal votes		2,765	98.4	+1.2
Informal votes		44	1.6	−1.2
Turnout		2,809	63.8	−12.8
Labor gain from Nationalist		Swing	+11.6	

1921 Western Australian state election: Fremantle
Party	Candidate	Votes	%	±%
Labor	Walter Jones	1,399	45.1	−13.1
Nationalist	Frank Gibson	1,119	36.0	+36.0
Nationalist	Joseph Allen	586	18.9	+18.9
Total formal votes		3,104	97.2	−2.5
Informal votes		88	2.8	+2.5
Turnout		3,192	76.6	+11.6
Two-party-preferred result
Nationalist	Frank Gibson	1,667	53.7	+53.7
Labor	Walter Jones	1,437	46.3	−11.9
Nationalist gain from Labor		Swing	N/A	

=== Elections in the 1910s ===
1917 Western Australian state election: Fremantle
Party	Candidate	Votes	%	±%
Labor	Walter Jones	1,654	58.2	+4.4
National Labor	William Carpenter	1,189	41.8	+41.8
Total formal votes		2,843	99.7	+2.4
Informal votes		9	0.3	–2.4
Turnout		2,852	65.0	+6.4
Labor gain from National Labor		Swing	N/A	

1914 Western Australian state election: Fremantle
Party	Candidate	Votes	%	±%
Labor	William Carpenter	1,716	53.8	−6.9
Liberal	John Stewart	938	29.4	−9.9
Liberal	Frederick McLaren	537	16.8	+16.8
Total formal votes		3,191	97.3	−1.3
Informal votes		90	2.7	+1.3
Turnout		3,281	58.6	−22.3
Labor hold		Swing	N/A	

- Preferences were not distributed.

1911 Western Australian state election: Fremantle
Party	Candidate	Votes	%	±%
Labor	William Carpenter	1,716	60.7	
Ministerialist	William Murphy	1,110	39.3	
Total formal votes		2,826	98.6	
Informal votes		40	1.4	
Turnout		2,866	80.9	
Labor gain from Ministerialist		Swing		

1910 Fremantle state by-election
Party	Candidate	Votes	%	±%
Ministerialist	William Murphy	858	56.3	N/A
Labor	William Somerville	665	43.7	+43.7
Total formal votes		1,523	99.6	
Informal votes		6	0.4	
Turnout		1,529	62.7	
Ministerialist hold		Swing	N/A	

|votes =

=== Elections in the 1900s ===
1908 Western Australian state election: Fremantle
Party	Candidate	Votes	%	±%
Ministerialist	James Price	unopposed		
Ministerialist hold		Swing		

1905 Western Australian state election: Fremantle
Party	Candidate	Votes	%	±%
Ministerialist	James Price	744	52.5	+3.3
Labour	Ted Needham	674	47.5	–3.3
Total formal votes		1,418	98.1	–0.7
Informal votes		28	1.9	+0.7
Turnout		1,446	61.9	+28.7
Ministerialist gain from Labour		Swing	+3.3	

1904 Western Australian state election: Fremantle
Party	Candidate	Votes	%	±%
Labour	Ted Needham	875	50.8	+50.8
Ministerialist	Frank Cadd	847	49.2	+49.2
Total formal votes		1,722	98.8	+0.5
Informal votes		21	1.2	–0.5
Turnout		1,743	33.2	+10.6
Labour gain from Ministerialist		Swing	+50.8	

1901 Western Australian state election: Fremantle
Party	Candidate	Votes	%	±%
Ministerialist	John Higham	194	65.1	–34.9
Opposition	George Bricknell	104	34.9	+34.9
Total formal votes		298	98.3	n/a
Informal votes		5	1.7	n/a
Turnout		303	22.6	n/a
Ministerialist hold		Swing	–34.9	

- Higham had held the seat unopposed in 1897.

=== Elections in the 1890s ===
1897 Western Australian colonial election: Fremantle
Party	Candidate	Votes	%	±%
Ministerialist	John Higham	unopposed		
Ministerialist hold		Swing		

1894 Western Australian colonial election: Fremantle
Party	Candidate	Votes	%	±%
None	William Marmion	218	53.7	–46.3
None	Arthur Diamond	188	46.3	+46.3

1890 Western Australian colonial election: Fremantle
Party	Candidate	Votes	%	±%
None	William Marmion	unopposed		
