= Members of the Western Australian Legislative Assembly, 2008–2013 =

This is a list of members of the Western Australian Legislative Assembly from 2008 to 2013.

Name	Party	District	Years in office
Peter Abetz	Liberal	Southern River	2008–2017
Frank Alban	Liberal	Swan Hills	2008–2017
Lisa Baker	Labor	Maylands	2008–2025
Colin Barnett	Liberal	Cottesloe	1990–2018
Ian Blayney	Liberal	Geraldton	2008–2021
John Bowler	Independent	Kalgoorlie	2001–2013
Ian Britza	Liberal	Morley	2008–2017
Troy Buswell	Liberal	Vasse	2005–2014
Tony Buti ^{[6]}	Labor	Armadale	2010–present
Adele Carles ^{[2]}^{[5]}	Greens WA/Independent	Fremantle	2009–2013
Alan Carpenter ^{[4]}	Labor	Willagee	1996–2009
John Castrilli	Liberal	Bunbury	2005–2017
Vince Catania	Labor/National^{[3]}	North West	2008–2022
Liz Constable^{[1]}	Independent	Churchlands	1991–2013
Roger Cook	Labor	Kwinana	2008–present
Murray Cowper	Liberal	Murray-Wellington	2005–2017
John Day	Liberal	Kalamunda	1993–2017
Joe Francis	Liberal	Jandakot	2008–2017
Janine Freeman	Labor	Nollamara	2008–2021
Brendon Grylls	National	Central Wheatbelt	2001–2017
Kim Hames	Liberal	Dawesville	1993–2001; 2005–2017
Liza Harvey	Liberal	Scarborough	2008–2021
John Hyde	Labor	Perth	2001–2013
Albert Jacob	Liberal	Ocean Reef	2008–2017
Graham Jacobs	Liberal	Eyre	2005–2017
Rob Johnson	Liberal	Hillarys	1993–2017
Bill Johnston	Labor	Cannington	2008–2025
John Kobelke	Labor	Balcatta	1989–2013
Tony Krsticevic	Liberal	Carine	2008–2021
Fran Logan	Labor	Cockburn	2001–2021
Jim McGinty^{[2]}	Labor	Fremantle	1990–2009
Mark McGowan	Labor	Rockingham	1996–2023
John McGrath	Liberal	South Perth	2005–2021
Alannah MacTiernan ^{[6]}	Labor	Armadale	1996–2010
Bill Marmion	Liberal	Nedlands	2008–2021
Carol Martin	Labor	Kimberley	2001–2013
Paul Miles	Liberal	Wanneroo	2008–2017
Andrea Mitchell	Liberal	Kingsley	2008–2017
Mick Murray	Labor	Collie-Preston	2001–2021
Mike Nahan	Liberal	Riverton	2008–2021
Tony O'Gorman	Labor	Joondalup	2001–2013
Paul Papalia	Labor	Warnbro	2007–2026
Christian Porter	Liberal	Bateman	2008–2013
John Quigley	Labor	Mindarie	2001–2025
Margaret Quirk	Labor	Girrawheen	2001–2025
Terry Redman	National	Blackwood-Stirling	2005–2021
Eric Ripper	Labor	Belmont	1988–2013
Michelle Roberts	Labor	Midland	1994–2025
Rita Saffioti	Labor	West Swan	2008–present
Tony Simpson	Liberal	Darling Range	2005–2017
Tom Stephens	Labor	Pilbara	2005–2013
Michael Sutherland	Liberal	Mount Lawley	2008–2017
Chris Tallentire	Labor	Gosnells	2008–2025
David Templeman	Labor	Mandurah	2001–2025
Peter Tinley ^{[4]}	Labor	Willagee	2009–2025
Andrew Waddell	Labor	Forrestfield	2008–2013
Terry Waldron	National	Wagin	2001–2017
Peter Watson	Labor	Albany	2001–2021
Martin Whitely	Labor	Bassendean	2001–2013
Grant Woodhams	National	Moore	2005–2013
Janet Woollard	Independent	Alfred Cove	2001–2013
Ben Wyatt	Labor	Victoria Park	2006–2021

== Notes ==
^{1} Though Liz Constable was elected as an independent, she joined Colin Barnett's Liberal government as minister for education on 23 September 2008. Despite this, she continued to sit in the Assembly as an independent.
^{2} On 3 April 2009, Labor member for Fremantle and former Attorney-General Jim McGinty resigned. Greens candidate Adele Carles was elected to replace him at the by-election for Fremantle on 16 May 2009.
^{3} On 20 July 2009, Vince Catania, the member for North West, left the Labor Party and joined the Nationals.
^{4} On 2 October 2009, Labor member for Willagee and former premier Alan Carpenter resigned. Labor candidate Peter Tinley was elected to replace him at the by-election for Willagee on 28 November 2009.
^{5} On 6 May 2010, Adele Carles, the member for Fremantle, left the Greens to serve out her term as an Independent.
^{6} On 19 July 2010, Labor member for Armadale Alannah MacTiernan resigned to run for the federal seat of Canning. Labor candidate Tony Buti was elected to replace her at the by-election for Armadale on 2 October 2010.
