= Electoral results for the South Metropolitan Region =

This is a list of electoral results for the South Metropolitan Region in Western Australian state elections from the region's creation in 1989 until the present.

Legislation to abolish the region, along with all other Western Australian electoral regions, was passed in November 2021, with the 2025 state election to use a single state-wide electorate of 37 members.

== Election results ==
=== 2021 ===
2021 Western Australian state election: South Metropolitan
Party	Candidate	Votes	%	±%
Quota		54,302		
Labor	1. Sue Ellery (elected 1); 2. Kate Doust (elected 3); 3. Klara Andric (elected 4); 4. Stephen Pratt (elected 5); 5. Victoria Helps; 6. Kelly McManus	239,248	62.94	+18.08
Liberal	1. Nick Goiran (elected 2); 2. Michelle Hofmann; 3. Ka-ren Chew; 4. Robert Reid; 5. Nitin Vashisht; 6. Scott Stirling	67,000	17.63	−7.22
Greens	1. Brad Pettitt (elected 6); 2. Lynn MacLaren; 3. Daniel Garlett	26,257	6.91	−2.34
Christians	1. Warnar Spyker; 2. Sylvia Iradukunda	7,290	1.92	−0.06
Legalise Cannabis	1. Moshe Bernstein; 2. Scott Shortland	6,877	1.81	+1.81
One Nation	1. Philip Scott; 2. Bradley Dickinson	3,972	1.04	−5.95
Shooters, Fishers, Farmers	1. Steven Tonge; 2. Paul Bedford	3,920	1.03	−0.47
No Mandatory Vaccination	1. Cam Tinley; 2. Michael Fletcher; 3. Greg Bell	3,842	1.01	+1.01
Liberal Democrats	1. Aaron Stonehouse; 2. Harvey Smith; 3. Jared Neaves; 4. Ivan Tomshin; 5. Laurentiu Zamfirescu; 6. Peter Leech	3,369	0.89	−3.02
Liberals for Climate	1. Keith Pomeroy; 2. Daniel Herron	3,262	0.86	+0.49
Animal Justice	1. Colleen Saporita; 2. Katrina Love	3,033	0.80	−0.48
Western Australia	1. Katy Mair; 2. Gavin Waugh	2,312	0.61	+0.27
Independent	1. Graham West; 2. Liam Strickland	1,683	0.44	+0.44
WAxit	1. Peter McLernon; 2. Jo-Anne Vincent-Barwood	1,341	0.35	−0.33
Daylight Saving	1. Amanda Klaj; 2. Craig Curtis	1,319	0.35	−0.45
Sustainable Australia	1. Ryan Oostryck; 2. Jane Loveday	1,169	0.31	+0.31
Great Australian	1. Samantha Vinci; 2. Susan Hoddinott	1,097	0.29	+0.29
Socialist Alliance	1. Marianne Mackay; 2. Dirk Kelly	948	0.25	−0.14
Health Australia	1. Michele Castle; 2. Catheryn Wright	646	0.17	+0.17
Independent	Larry Foley	397	0.10	+0.10
Independent	1. Jourdan Kestel; 2. Lee Herridge	371	0.10	+0.10
Independent	1. Mark Rowley; 2. Marlie Touchell	273	0.07	+0.07
Independent	1. Glen Leslie; 2. Stephen Yarwood	202	0.05	+0.05
Independent	1. Stan Francis; 2. Jeremy Lay	160	0.04	+0.04
Independent	1. Dave Glossop; 2. Lewis Butto	112	0.03	+0.03
Independent	Leon Hamilton	10	0.00	+0.00
Total formal votes		380,110	98.08	+0.99
Informal votes		7,432	1.92	−0.99
Turnout		387,542	86.28	−0.93

=== 2017 ===
2017 Western Australian state election: South Metropolitan
Party	Candidate	Votes	%	±%
Quota		49,570		
Labor	1. Sue Ellery (elected 1); 2. Kate Doust (elected 3); 3. Pierre Yang (elected 4); 4. Kelly McManus; 5. Vicky Burrows; 6. Dustin Rafferty	155,678	44.87	+7.95
Liberal	1. Nick Goiran (elected 2); 2. Simon O'Brien (elected 6); 3. Phil Edman; 4. Michelle Hofmann; 5. Lorraine Finlay; 6. Daryl Pranata	86,197	24.84	−22.54
Greens	1. Lynn MacLaren; 2. Jordon Steele-John; 3. Nasrin Dehghani	32,100	9.25	+0.46
One Nation	1. Philip Scott; 2. Richard Eldridge; 3. Ekaterina Andreeva	24,256	6.99	+6.99
Liberal Democrats	1. Aaron Stonehouse (elected 5); 2. Angadjeet Sanghera	13,571	3.91	+3.91
Christians	1. Bob Burdett; 2. Carmen Burdett	6,876	1.98	+0.04
Shooters, Fishers, Farmers	1. Peter Raffaelli; 2. Wayne Higgs	5,211	1.50	−0.02
Animal Justice	1. Katrina Love; 2. Ramona Janssen	4,434	1.28	+1.28
Daylight Saving	1. Wilson Tucker; 2. Peita Alberti	2,751	0.79	+0.79
Family First	1. Nigel Irvine; 2. Cara Heng	2,419	0.70	−1.09
Micro Business	1. Cam Tinley; 2. Andrew Middleton; 3. Len Dibben	2,361	0.68	+0.68
Independent	1. Carol Adams; 2. Karen Vernon; 3. Luke Bolton; 4. Jonathan Ford	2,308	0.67	+0.67
Independent	1. Robert Cotterell; 2. Michelle Cotterell	1,405	0.40	+0.40
Socialist Alliance	1. Sam Wainwright; 2. Petrina Harley	1,367	0.39	+0.39
Flux the System!	1. Alexander Brownbill; 2. Keith Pomeroy	1,288	0.37	+0.37
Matheson for WA	1. Andrew Luobikis; 2. Angela Watson	1,176	0.34	+0.34
Fluoride Free WA	1. Derek Rucki; 2. Nita Thakrar	996	0.29	+0.29
Independent	1. Vito Matarazzo; 2. Yusuf Oruc	939	0.27	+0.27
Independent	Tony Romano	396	0.11	+0.11
Independent	Laona Jones	379	0.11	+0.11
Independent	1. William Freeman; 2. Daksh Varma	291	0.08	+0.08
Independent Flux	1. Rick Smith; 2. Adrian Snary	242	0.07	+0.07
Independent	Norm Heslington	142	0.04	+0.04
Independent	Rosemary Lorrimar	109	0.03	+0.03
Independent	Frank Brown	93	0.03	+0.03
Total formal votes		346,985	97.13	−0.11
Informal votes		10,257	2.87	+0.11
Turnout		357,242	87.28	−2.19

=== 2013 ===
2013 Western Australian state election: South Metropolitan
Party	Candidate	Votes	%	±%
Quota		43,737		
Liberal	1. Simon O'Brien (elected 1); 2. Nick Goiran (elected 3); 3. Phil Edman (elected 5); 4. Gabriel Moens; 5. Michelle Jack	145,053	47.38	+8.81
Labor	1. Sue Ellery (elected 2); 2. Kate Doust (elected 4); 3. Anne Wood; 4. Dominic Rose; 5. Sharon Thiel; 6. Sandy Bird	113,026	36.92	−3.69
Greens	1. Lynn MacLaren (elected 6); 2. Tammy Solonec; 3. Jean Jenkins	26,911	8.79	−3.12
Christians	1. Bob Burdett; 2. Ka-ren Chew	5,946	1.94	−0.06
Family First	1. Jim McCourt; 2. Steve Bolt	5,466	1.79	−0.34
Shooters and Fishers	1. Ian Blevin; 2. Michael Glover	4,651	1.52	+1.52
Independent	Keith Wilson	2,319	0.76	+0.76
Independent	John Tucak	1,909	0.62	+0.62
Independent	Jim Grayden	872	0.28	+0.28
Total formal votes		306,153	97.24	+0.13
Informal votes		8,702	2.76	−0.13
Turnout		314,855	89.47	+2.27

=== 2008 ===
2008 Western Australian state election: South Metropolitan
Party	Candidate	Votes	%	±%
Quota		40,084		
Labor	1. Sue Ellery (elected 1); 2. Kate Doust (elected 3); 3. Fiona Henderson; 4. Batong Pham; 5. Jack de Groot; 6. Andrew Vitolins	113,957	40.61	−6.6
Liberal	1. Simon O'Brien (elected 2); 2. Nick Goiran (elected 4); 3. Phil Edman (elected 5); 4. Donna Gordin; 5. John Jamieson; 6. Michelle Verkerk	108,229	38.57	+3.0
Greens	1. Lynn MacLaren (elected 6); 2. Scott Ryan	33,426	11.91	+4.5
Family First	1. Frank Lindsey; 2. Bev Custers	5,981	2.13	+0.1
Christian Democrats	1. Brent Tremain; 2. Linda Brewer	5,605	2.00	−0.2
Independent	1. Christopher Oughton; 2. Huw Grossmith	2,679	0.95	+1.0
Daylight Savings	Jeffrey Gidman	2,061	0.73	+0.73
National	1. Hilary Wheater; 2. Peter Wahlsten	1,966	0.70	+0.7
Independent	Steve Walker	1,782	0.64	+0.6
One Nation	Neil Gilmour	1,716	0.61	−0.6
Citizens Electoral Council	1. Paul Ellison; 2. Barry Bushen	1,597	0.57	+0.6
Independent	1. Eric Miller; 2. Yolanda Nardizzi	1,584	0.56	+0.6
Total formal votes		280,583	97.11	+0.5
Informal votes		8,339	2.89	−0.5
Turnout		288,922	87.20	−3.3

=== 2005 ===
2005 Western Australian state election: South Metropolitan
Party	Candidate	Votes	%	±%
Quota		39,484		
Labor	1. Kate Doust (elected 1); 2. Sue Ellery (elected 3); 3. Sheila Mills (elected 5); 4. David Vallelonga; 5. David Klemm; 6. Daniel Guise	110,286	46.6	+3.6
Liberal	1. Simon O'Brien (elected 2); 2. Barbara Scott (elected 4); 3. Roger Nicholls; 4. Alison Gibson; 5. Jane Blake	85,114	35.9	+2.0
Greens	1. Lynn MacLaren; 2. Nicola Paris	18,501	7.8	−1.2
Christian Democrats	1. Peter Watt; 2. Venetia Turkington	4,994	2.1	+2.1
Family First	1. Beverley Custers; 2. Paul Dean-Smith	4,342	1.8	+1.8
Fremantle Hospital Support Group	1. Murray McKay; 2. Giovanni Rotondella	3,103	1.3	+1.3
Democrats	1. Jason Meotti; 2. Andrew Ingram	3,090	1.3	−3.6
One Nation	1. Teresa van Lieshout; 2. Neil Gilmour	2,810	1.2	−5.9
Independent	Jakica Zaknic	1,206	0.5	+0.5
Public Hospital Support Group	1. Neil Marrett; 2. Vicki Doutch	1,169	0.5	+0.5
Liberals for Forests	1. Vicky Taylor; 2. Louise Wormald	1,030	0.4	+0.4
Independent	Won Choi	644	0.3	+0.3
Independent	Doug Thorp	451	0.2	+0.2
Group K	1. Ian Jamieson; 2. Sam Wainwright	149	0.1	+0.1
Independent	Steven Milianku	13	0.01	+0.01
Total formal votes		236,902	96.6	−0.8
Informal votes		8,292	3.4	+0.8
Turnout		245,194	90.5	−0.4

=== 2001 ===
2001 Western Australian state election: South Metropolitan
Party	Candidate	Votes	%	±%
Quota		37,068		
Labor	1. Sue Ellery (elected 1); 2. Kate Doust (elected 3); 3. Sylvia Mortas; 4. Liam Costello; 5. Kim Young; 6. Chilip Foo	95,625	43.0	+6.9
Liberal	1. Barbara Scott (elected 2); 2. Simon O'Brien (elected 4); 3. Alison Gibson; 4. Barry Pound; 5. Margaret Thomas	75,277	33.8	−7.5
Greens	1. Jim Scott (elected 5); 2. Lynn MacLaren	20,028	9.0	+2.1
One Nation	1. Tony Dines; 2. Sandra Rawlings	15,849	7.1	+7.1
Democrats	1. Jakica Zaknic; 2. Pam Townshend	10,952	4.9	−1.6
Curtin Labor Alliance	1. Adrian Bennett; 2. June Bennett	2,890	1.3	+1.3
Independent	Eddie Hwang	885	0.4	+0.4
Independent	Lawrence Shave	566	0.3	+0.3
Seniors	Pet van de Zuidwind	222	0.1	+0.1
Independent	Rick Finney	109	0.1	+0.1
Total formal votes		222,403	97.4	+0.3
Informal votes		5,910	2.6	−0.3
Turnout		228,313	90.9	+0.5

=== 1996 ===
1996 Western Australian state election: South Metropolitan
Party	Candidate	Votes	%	±%
Quota		34,841		
Liberal	1. Simon O'Brien (elected 1); 2. Barbara Scott (elected 3); 3. Peter Bacich; 4. Patricia Waghorn; 5. Anthony Jarvis	86,281	41.3	−3.8
Labor	1. John Halden (elected 2); 2. Cheryl Davenport (elected 4); 3. Geoff Donegan; 4. Graham Giffard; 5. Dermot Buckley; 6. Andy Fitzgerald	75,462	36.1	−4.2
Greens	1. Jim Scott (elected 5); 2. Mary Jenkins	14,359	6.9	+1.4
Democrats	1. Don Millar; 2. Shirley de la Hunty	13,495	6.5	+4.0
Group A	1. Huw Grossmith; 2. Mark Grossmith	8,251	3.9	+3.9
Marijuana	Alison de Garis	5,370	2.6	+2.6
Independent	Russell Aubrey	3,261	1.6	+1.6
Racism No!	1. Clarrie Isaacs; 2. Arun Pradhan	1,939	0.9	+0.9
Natural Law	1. Cindy Hollings; 2. David Norman	623	0.3	+0.3
Total formal votes		209,041	97.1	−0.1
Informal votes		6,269	2.9	+0.1
Turnout		215,310	90.4	−3.5

=== 1993 ===
1993 Western Australian state election: South Metropolitan
Party	Candidate	Votes	%	±%
Quota		33,876		
Liberal	1. Clive Griffiths (elected 1); 2. Barbara Scott (elected 3); 3. Simon O'Brien; 4. Lesley Vanstan; 5. Robert Carruthers	91,585	45.06	+3.22
Labor	1. John Halden (elected 2); 2. Cheryl Davenport (elected 4); 3. Garry Kelly; 4. John Noonan; 5. Reg Gordon; 6. Tony Lovett	81,981	40.33	−3.09
Greens	1. Jim Scott (elected 5); 2. Alison de Garis	11,191	5.51	+5.51
Group F	1. Barry Hodge; 2. Kim Hodge	5,921	2.91	+2.91
Democrats	1. Don Millar; 2. Marlon Hercock	4,995	2.46	−1.83
Group D	1. Richard Utting; 2. Julie Dethridge	2,887	1.42	+1.42
Call to Australia	1. Gerard Goiran; 2. Beryl Rogers	2,473	1.22	+1.22
Grey Power	Michael Hutton	891	0.44	−4.50
Independent	Laurie Humphreys	556	0.27	+0.27
Independent	Geoffrey Taylor	428	0.21	+0.21
Republican	Veema Munroe	346	0.17	+0.17
Total formal votes		203,254	97.22	−0.21
Informal votes		5,819	2.78	+0.21
Turnout		209,073	93.93	

=== 1989 ===
1989 Western Australian state election: South Metropolitan
Party	Candidate	Votes	%	±%
Quota		30,790		
Labor	1. Garry Kelly (elected 1); 2. John Halden (elected 3); 3. Cheryl Davenport (elected 5); 4. Ed Dermer; 5. Reginald Gordon; 6. Joyce Edwards	80,221	43.42	
Liberal	1. Clive Griffiths (elected 2); 2. Phillip Pendal (elected 4); 3. Diane Airey; 4. Alan Harste; 5. John Hardwick	77,296	41.84	
Grey Power	Neville Crilly	9,128	4.94	
Democrats	1. Peter Nettleton; 2. David Banner	7,917	4.29	
Alternative Coalition	1. Christabel Bridge; 2. Robert Mann; 3. Gladys Yarran	6,314	3.42	
National	1. Miguel de San Miguel; 2. Leonard Phillips	3,862	2.09	
Total formal votes		184,738	97.18	
Informal votes		5,361	2.82	
Turnout		190,099	91.50	
