= Electoral results for the district of Armadale =

Western Australian district election results

This is a list of electoral results for the electoral district of Armadale in Western Australian state elections.

== Members for Armadale ==
Member	Party	Term
Bob Pearce	Labor	1983–1993
Kay Hallahan	Labor	1993–1996
Alannah MacTiernan	Labor	1996–2010
Tony Buti	Labor	2010–present

== Election results ==
=== Elections in the 2020s ===
2025 Western Australian state election: Armadale
Party	Candidate	Votes	%	±%
Labor	Tony Buti	13,144	52.5	−20.6
Liberal	Jason McNamara	4,379	17.5	+8.4
Greens	Shelley Harrington	3,032	12.1	+7.4
One Nation	Elizabeth Ierardi	2,059	8.2	+5.6
Christians	Arthur Kleyn	1,747	7.0	+1.5
Stop Pedophiles	C. Ling	672	2.7	+2.7
Total formal votes		25,033	94.6	−0.8
Informal votes		1,429	5.4	+0.8
Turnout		26,462	81.0	+2.4
Two-party-preferred result
Labor	Tony Buti	17,244	67.4	−16.5
Liberal	Jason McNamara	8,358	32.6	+16.5
Labor hold		Swing	−16.5	

Results are not final. Last updated on 26 March 2025 at 5:30 PM AWST

2021 Western Australian state election: Armadale
Party	Candidate	Votes	%	±%
Labor	Tony Buti	18,434	74.4	+7.7
Liberal	Mahesh Arumugam	1,859	7.5	−9.3
Christians	Arthur Kleyn	1,424	5.7	−0.6
Greens	Jessica Openshaw	1,135	4.6	−1.9
One Nation	Jayden Carr	682	2.8	+2.8
Western Australia	Blake Clarke	649	2.6	+2.6
No Mandatory Vaccination	Lisa Moody	417	1.7	+1.7
WAxit	Eby Mathew	171	0.7	+0.7
Total formal votes		24,771	95.3	+0.8
Informal votes		1,229	4.7	−0.8
Turnout		26,000	80.7	−0.6
Two-party-preferred result
Labor	Tony Buti	21,159	85.5	+10.3
Liberal	Mahesh Arumugam	3,597	14.5	−10.3
Labor hold		Swing	+10.3	

=== Elections in the 2010s ===
2017 Western Australian state election: Armadale
Party	Candidate	Votes	%	±%
Labor	Tony Buti	15,091	66.7	+13.0
Liberal	Wendy Jeffery	3,814	16.9	−15.9
Greens	Anthony Pyle	1,456	6.4	−0.2
Christians	Nitasha Naidu	1,448	6.4	−0.6
Independent	Cameron Huynh	556	2.5	+2.5
Micro Business	Edward Flaherty	269	1.2	+1.2
Total formal votes		22,634	94.5	+1.7
Informal votes		1,325	5.5	−1.7
Turnout		23,959	84.6	+0.3
Two-party-preferred result
Labor	Tony Buti	17,008	75.2	+15.5
Liberal	Wendy Jeffery	5,619	24.8	−15.5
Labor hold		Swing	+15.5	

2013 Western Australian state election: Armadale
Party	Candidate	Votes	%	±%
Labor	Tony Buti	10,836	53.7	–2.3
Liberal	Katherine Webster	6,613	32.8	+6.8
Christians	Jamie Van Burgel	1,403	7.0	–0.4
Greens	Damon Pages-Oliver	1,333	6.6	–4.2
Total formal votes		20,185	92.8	−1.2
Informal votes		1,562	7.2	+1.2
Turnout		21,747	87.8	
Two-party-preferred result
Labor	Tony Buti	12,032	59.6	–5.2
Liberal	Katherine Webster	8,149	40.4	+5.2
Labor hold		Swing	–5.2	

2010 Armadale state by-election
Party	Candidate	Votes	%	±%
Labor	Tony Buti	10,021	57.90	+1.94
Christian Democrats	Jamie van Burgel	3,561	20.57	+13.27
Greens	Owen Davies	2,220	12.83	+2.01
Independent	John Tucak	1,506	8.70	+8.70
Total formal votes		17,308	64.65	+0.61
Informal votes		978	5.35	−0.61
Turnout		18,286	75.21	−10.68
Two-candidate-preferred result
Labor	Tony Buti	12,159	70.25	+5.42
Christian Democrats	Jamie van Burgel	5,140	29.70	+29.70
Labor hold		Swing	+5.42	

=== Elections in the 2000s ===
2008 Western Australian state election: Armadale
Party	Candidate	Votes	%	±%
Labor	Alannah MacTiernan	10,899	55.96	−0.1
Liberal	Steven Innes	5,050	25.93	+1.2
Greens	Caroline Wielinga	2,107	10.82	+6.0
Christian Democrats	Kevin Swarts	1,422	7.30	+1.5
Total formal votes		19,478	94.04	
Informal votes		1,235	5.96	
Turnout		20,713	85.88	
Two-party-preferred result
Labor	Alannah MacTiernan	12,628	64.85	+0.6
Liberal	Steven Innes	6,845	35.15	−0.6
Labor hold		Swing	+0.6	

2005 Western Australian state election: Armadale
Party	Candidate	Votes	%	±%
Labor	Alannah MacTiernan	13,095	55.0	+10.0
Liberal	Diane Johnson	6,250	26.2	+23.9
Christian Democrats	Madeleine Goiran	1,317	5.5	−0.5
Greens	Jason Brennan	1,171	4.9	−1.2
Family First	John Coules	757	3.2	+3.2
One Nation	Colin Butler	700	2.9	−10.6
Independent	Bret Busby	444	1.9	+1.9
Citizens Electoral Council	Joyce Richards	92	0.4	+0.4
Total formal votes		23,826	93.8	−0.6
Informal votes		1,570	6.2	+0.6
Turnout		25,396	90.4	
Two-party-preferred result
Labor	Alannah MacTiernan	14,993	63.0	+6.4
Liberal	Diane Johnson	8,799	37.0	+37.0
Labor hold		Swing	+6.4	

2001 Western Australian state election: Armadale
Party	Candidate	Votes	%	±%
Labor	Alannah MacTiernan	10,055	45.7	+1.3
Independent	Roger Stubbs	5,328	24.2	+24.2
One Nation	Colin Butler	2,980	13.5	+13.5
Christian Democrats	Madeleine Goiran	1,372	6.2	+6.2
Greens	Thomas Chvojka	1,339	6.1	+6.1
Democrats	John Hoare	613	2.8	−2.8
Curtin Labor Alliance	Everald Curtis	318	1.4	+1.4
Total formal votes		22,005	94.4	−0.6
Informal votes		1,308	5.6	+0.6
Turnout		23,313	91.2	
Two-candidate-preferred result
Labor	Alannah MacTiernan	12,459	57.1	+3.1
Independent	Roger Stubbs	9,342	42.9	+42.9
Labor hold		Swing	+3.1	

=== Elections in the 1990s ===
1996 Western Australian state election: Armadale
Party	Candidate	Votes	%	±%
Labor	Alannah MacTiernan	9,667	44.4	−4.4
Liberal	Tony Andretta	6,830	31.4	−7.7
Independent	Spike Fokkema	4,036	18.6	+18.6
Democrats	Raelene Watson	1,221	5.6	+3.1
Total formal votes		21,754	95.0	−0.2
Informal votes		1,155	5.0	+0.2
Turnout		22,909	90.7	
Two-party-preferred result
Labor	Alannah MacTiernan	11,732	54.0	−1.0
Liberal	Tony Andretta	9,982	46.0	+1.0
Labor hold		Swing	−1.0	

1993 Western Australian state election: Armadale
Party	Candidate	Votes	%	±%
Labor	Kay Hallahan	9,413	48.4	+0.7
Liberal	Maureen Healy	7,372	37.9	−0.3
Independent	Kenneth Williamson	794	4.1	+4.1
Democrats	Fred Miller	456	2.3	+2.3
	Zac Schonberg	453	2.3	+2.3
Independent	Ivan Talbot	412	2.1	+2.1
Independent	William Higgins	313	1.6	+1.6
Independent	Tammo Hoover	249	1.3	+1.3
Total formal votes		19,462	94.8	+4.2
Informal votes		1,077	5.2	−4.2
Turnout		20,539	94.3	+2.4
Two-party-preferred result
Labor	Kay Hallahan	10,757	55.3	+2.2
Liberal	Maureen Healy	8,705	44.7	−2.2
Labor hold		Swing	+2.2	

=== Elections in the 1980s ===
1989 Western Australian state election: Armadale
Party	Candidate	Votes	%	±%
Labor	Bob Pearce	7,749	47.7	−14.6
Liberal	Maureen Healy	6,207	38.2	+1.1
Grey Power	William Higgins	1,269	7.8	+7.8
Independent	Reginald Hames	1,026	6.3	+6.3
Total formal votes		16,251	90.6	
Informal votes		1,692	9.4	
Turnout		17,943	91.9	
Two-party-preferred result
Labor	Bob Pearce	8,629	53.1	−9.5
Liberal	Maureen Healy	7,622	46.9	+9.5
Labor hold		Swing	−9.5	

1986 Western Australian state election: Armadale
Party	Candidate	Votes	%	±%
Labor	Bob Pearce	12,354	65.7	+2.4
Liberal	Phillip Giblett	6,442	34.3	−2.4
Total formal votes		18,796	97.0	−0.3
Informal votes		583	3.0	+0.3
Turnout		19,379	91.1	+2.7
Labor hold		Swing	+2.4	

1983 Western Australian state election: Armadale
Party	Candidate	Votes	%	±%
Labor	Bob Pearce	9,232	63.6	
Liberal	Douglas Cable	5,290	36.4	
Total formal votes		14,522	97.3	
Informal votes		403	2.7	
Turnout		14,925	88.4	
Labor hold		Swing		
