= Fremantle by-election =

Fremantle by-election may refer to:

- 1945 Fremantle by-election
- 1990 Fremantle state by-election
- 1994 Fremantle by-election
- 2009 Fremantle state by-election
- 2018 Fremantle by-election
