= List of member parties of the Australian Greens =

Australian Greens
- International affiliation: Global Greens
- Colours: Green

Website
- greens.org.au

The Australian Greens is an Australian political party. It is a confederation, with a national organisation comprising a member body in each state and territory, as follows:

- New South Wales Greens
- Victorian Greens
- Queensland Greens
- Western Australian Greens
- South Australian Greens
- Tasmanian Greens
- ACT Greens
- NT Greens
