= Joseph Sleeman =

Australian politician

The Honourable Joseph Sleeman
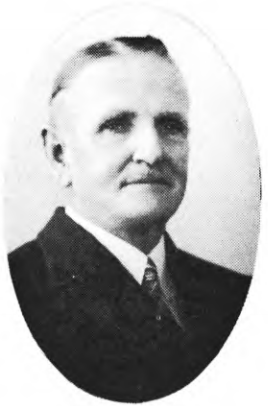

13th Speaker of the Legislative Assembly of Western Australia
- In office 4 August 1939 – 31 July 1947
- Preceded by: William Johnson
- Succeeded by: Charles North

Member of the Legislative Assembly of Western Australia
- In office 22 March 1924 – 21 March 1959
- Preceded by: Frank Gibson
- Succeeded by: Harry Fletcher
- Constituency: Fremantle

Personal details
- Born: 21 June 1885 Inglewood, Victoria, Australia
- Died: 6 July 1970 (aged 85) Fremantle, Western Australia, Australia
- Party: Labor

Joseph Bertram Sleeman (21 June 1885 – 6 July 1970) was an Australian politician who was a Labor Party member of the Legislative Assembly of Western Australia from 1924 to 1959, representing the seat of Fremantle. He served as Speaker of the Legislative Assembly from 1939 to 1947.

Sleeman was born in the small country town of Inglewood, Victoria. He and his parents moved to Western Australia in 1895, and he attended school in Day Dawn, a mining town in the state's Mid West. After working for a period as a storeman in Leonora, Sleeman moved to Fremantle (the port city of Perth), where he began working as an organiser for the Shop Assistants Union. At the 1924 state election, he stood for the seat of Fremantle, and defeated the sitting Nationalist member, Frank Gibson. Following the 1939 election, Sleeman was elected Speaker of the Legislative Assembly, going on to serve until the Labor government's defeat at the 1947 election. Only two other speakers have served for longer periods – Sir James Lee-Steere and John Hearman. Sleeman continued in parliament until his retirement at the 1959 election, having spent nearly 35 years as the member for Fremantle. He died in July 1970, aged 85.

In 1992 Joe Sleeman Court, a housing complex on South Terrace, was named in Sleeman's honour and dedicated by the then MLA for Fremantle, Jim McGinty. A small road in the O'Connor industrial area, Sleeman Close, is also named after him.

Parliament of Western Australia
| Preceded by Frank Gibson | Member for Fremantle; 1924–1959 | Succeeded by Harry Fletcher |
| Preceded by William Johnson | Speaker of the Legislative Assembly; 1939–1947 | Succeeded by Charles North |
