= Jim Scott (Australian politician) =

Australian politician (born 1946)

The Honourable Jim Scott
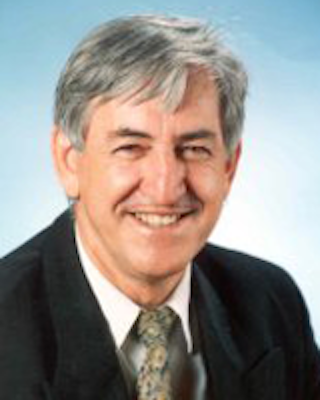

Member of the Western Australian Legislative Council
- In office 6 February 1993 – 26 January 2005
- Preceded by: Garry Kelly
- Succeeded by: Lynn MacLaren
- Constituency: South Metropolitan Region

Personal details
- Born: James Alan Scott; 16 November 1946 (age 79) Kellerberrin, Western Australia
- Party: Greens Western Australia
- Occupation: Politician

James Alan Scott (born 16 November 1946) is a former Australian politician and a pioneering member of the Greens Western Australia. He was the first Greens candidate elected to the Parliament of Western Australia, serving in the Western Australian Legislative Council from 1993 to 2005.

== Early life and career ==
Scott was born on 16 November 1946 in Kellerberrin, Western Australia. Before entering politics, he worked in a wide range of occupations, including as a new land farmer and rural fencing instructor in Badgingarra, an offshore oil worker, a clothing manufacturer and retailer, and a theatrical set builder.

== Political career ==
In the 1993 Western Australian state election, he was elected to the Western Australian Legislative Council region of South Metropolitan, the first member of the Greens elected to the state parliament. He served as the sole Greens member until 1997, when Giz Watson and Chrissy Sharp were also elected to the Council.

During his time in Parliament, Scott served on several committees, including:

- Joint Standing Committee on Delegated Legislation: 14 June 1995 – 14 November 1996; reappointed 26 June 1997 – 10 January 2001
- Standing Committee on Environment and Public Affairs: 28 June 2001 – 23 January 2005
- Select Committee to Review the Legislative Council Standing Committee System: 1997
- Select Committee on Rules, Orders and Usage of the House: 2002–2003
- Select Committee into Workers Compensation: 2004

He also introduced several private members' bills on issues such as public interest disclosures, genetically modified organisms, and urban planning. Notable examples include:

- Public Interests Disclosures Bill 1997
- Genetically Modified Material (Temporary Prohibition) Bill 1999
- Metropolitan Region Scheme (Fremantle Controlled Access Highways) Bill 2001

He held the seat until 2005, when he resigned to contest the Legislative Assembly seat of Fremantle, unsuccessfully.

== Legacy ==
Scott’s election marked a major milestone for the Greens in Western Australia, establishing a presence in state politics. His contributions helped solidify the party’s future influence in the WA Parliament.

== Political views and advocacy ==
As the first Greens (WA) member elected to the Western Australian Parliament, Jim Scott was a prominent advocate for environmental protection, government transparency, and civil liberties. He supported reforms to strengthen the role of the Legislative Council as an effective house of review and was critical of government inaction on environmental issues.
