= Lynn MacLaren =

Australian politician

The Honourable Lynn MacLaren
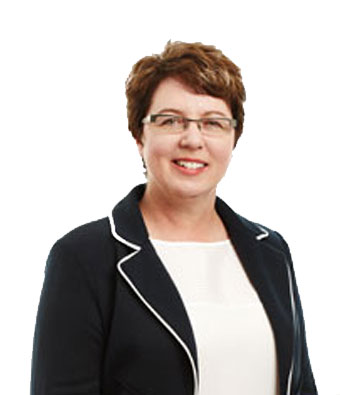

Councillor of the City of Albany
- Incumbent
- Assumed office 21 October 2023

Member of the Western Australian Legislative Council for South Metropolitan Region
- In office 15 February 2005 – 21 May 2005
- Preceded by: Jim Scott
- Succeeded by: Sheila Mills
- In office 22 May 2009 – 21 May 2017
- Preceded by: Sheila Mills

Personal details
- Born: 24 March 1962 (age 64) Colorado Springs, Colorado, United States
- Party: Greens WA
- Education: University of California, Davis

Lynn Ellen MacLaren (born 24 March 1962) is an American-born Australian politician. She is currently serving as a councillor for the City of Albany. MacLaren previously served as a Member of the Western Australian Legislative Council for the Greens (WA) from 2009 to 2017, where she advocated for climate action, social justice, and environmental sustainability.

== Early life ==
MacLaren was born in Colorado Springs and studied journalism at University of California, where she began a career in journalism as the chief photographer and staff reporter for two small California daily newspapers, the Desert Dispatch and the Victor Valley Daily Press.

After studying at Albany Senior High School through the Rotary Youth Exchange program, MacLaren relocated to Perth in 1982 and spent seven years in small business as a desktop publisher and technical writer. In the mid 1990s, MacLaren was prominent in the campaign to put live animal exports on the public agenda and was the foundation president of the People Against Cruelty in Animal Transport, also serving on the executive board of Animals Australia.

From 1997, MacLaren worked for Jim Scott MLC and did project work with the Environmental Defender's Office, and the Community Housing Coalition (WA). She later worked as a researcher for Giz Watson MLC.

== Political career ==
On 15 February 2005, she was elected to the Western Australian Legislative Council as a Greens Western Australia member for South Metropolitan Region, following Jim Scott's resignation to contest the lower house seat of Fremantle. MacLaren was defeated at the 2005 state election.

== After politics ==
From 2005 to 2008, MacLaren served as Senior Policy Officer with the Western Australian Council of Social Service, where she specialised in policy areas of poverty, housing and sector viability. She also worked as a consultant in strategic planning and capacity building for community organisations.

== Return to politics ==
MacLaren contested again in the 2008 state election for South Metropolitan Region and was successful. MacLaren's first full term began in May 2009. She contested the 2013 state election and was re-elected.

MacLaren's portfolios included: planning, housing, community services, social inclusion, heritage, animals, volunteering, seniors, disability issues, food and GMOs, sexuality, tourism, arts and culture, small business and science and innovation.

MacLaren has introduced several private members bills in her portfolio areas: Climate Change Readiness Coastal Planning and Protection Bill, Same-Sex Marriage Bill, Free Range Eggs Truth in Labelling Bill, Road Traffic Amendment Keeping a Safe Distance from Bicycles Bill, Biodiversity Conservation Priority Reforms Bill.

She has served as a Member of the Environment and Public Affairs Committee and the Legislation Committee. While on the EPAC, MacLaren participated in an inquiry into the Transportation of Detained Persons which followed on from the death in a custodial van of Aboriginal man, Mr Ward, who was being transported in the hot conditions of northern Western Australia. She made a Minority Report in one the committee's Petition Report opposing the expansion of urban development in Moore River.

MacLaren was defeated at the 2017 state election.

At the 2023 Western Australian local elections, she was elected as a councillor in the City of Albany.

== Political views and advocacy ==
Lynn MacLaren is known for her strong advocacy on environmental and social justice issues. As a member of the Greens (WA), she has focused on climate action, renewable energy, and sustainable development. MacLaren has been a vocal supporter of policies to address climate change and promote environmental conservation, including advocating for stronger protections for Western Australia's natural resources.

In addition to environmental concerns, MacLaren has worked on social justice issues, including advocating for the rights of Indigenous Australians, affordable housing, and greater investment in public services. She has also been an advocate for animal welfare, pushing for reforms in areas such as factory farming and wildlife protection.

MacLaren was also a strong supporter of same-sex marriage and played an active role in advocating for its legalization in Australia. She introduced the Same-Sex Marriage Bill in the Western Australian Parliament in 2013, which sought to amend the Births, Deaths and Marriages Registration Act 1998 to allow for the registration and recognition of same-sex marriages in the state. She has also spoken at rallies and public forums, emphasizing the importance of equality and non-discrimination for all individuals, regardless of sexual orientation.
