= Arthur Marshall (Australian politician) =

Australian politician and sportsman (1934–2018)

Member of the Western Australian Parliament for Dawesville
- In office 14 December 1996 – 26 February 2005
- Preceded by: New creation
- Succeeded by: Kim Hames

Member of the Western Australian Parliament for Murray
- In office 6 February 1993 – 14 December 1996
- Preceded by: Keith Read
- Succeeded by: Seat abolished

Personal details
- Born: 5 August 1934; East Fremantle, Western Australia, Australia
- Died: 7 June 2018 (aged 83)
- Political party: Liberal Party
- Children: Dixie Marshall; Scott Marshall & Clark Marshall
- Occupation: Tennis professional

Arthur Dix Marshall OAM (5 August 1934 – 7 June 2018) was an Australian politician and sportsman from Western Australia.

== Biography ==
Marshall was born in East Fremantle in 1934 to Horrie and Eunice Marshall. He was educated at Palmyra Primary School, Fremantle Boys High School, and Wesley College, Perth, where he was a house captain and prefect. He had three children with his wife Helen, including Dixie Marshall, a local television newsreader. Marshall died from bone cancer on 7 June 2018.

== Sporting career ==
Marshall played Australian rules football for East Fremantle Football Club in the Western Australian National Football League (WANFL). Between 1954 and 1961 played 20 league for East Fremantle.

In 1955 and 1956 he entered the Wimbledon Championships, losing in the first and third rounds respectively.

In later life Marshall served as a football commentator with the Seven Network, and established the Arthur Marshall Tennis Academy in 1958.

== Politics ==
Marshall first contested a seat at the 1990 Fremantle state by-election as a Liberal candidate. He achieved 35.70% of the vote against Labor candidate Jim McGinty's 33.75%, but lost after the distribution of preferences. He won the seat of Murray in the 1993 election, succeeding Keith Read. A redistribution in 1994 saw the seat abolished and he was elected to the new seat of Dawesville at the 1996 election. He was re-elected in 2001 and retired at the 2005 election.

Marshall was awarded the Medal of the Order of Australia (OAM) in the 2006 Australia Day Honours for "service to the community through fundraising for a range of not-for-profit organisations, to sport, and to the Parliament of Western Australia".
