= 2010 Armadale state by-election =

The 2010 Armadale state by-election was held on 2 October 2010 for the Western Australian Legislative Assembly seat of Armadale in the south-eastern suburbs of Perth. It was triggered by the resignation of Labor member Alannah MacTiernan on 19 July 2010 to run for the seat of Canning in the 2010 federal election.

== Background ==
Alannah MacTiernan was first elected to the seat of Armadale at the 1996 state election. At the February 2001 state election, where the Labor party won government, MacTiernan became Minister for Planning and Infrastructure, a portfolio which included Transport, in the new Gallop Ministry. She held this position until Labor's defeat at the August 2008 state election, and was best known for overseeing of the construction of the Mandurah railway line, which she had championed from opposition. In early 2010, she announced her plans to contest the Liberal-held federal seat of Canning, which included her state seat, and on 26 February 2010 resigned from the shadow ministry.

She officially resigned from state parliament on 19 July 2010, two days after Prime Minister Julia Gillard had announced the timetable for the 2010 federal election. Despite a 2.16% swing to Labor in Canning and particularly strong results in areas which she had previously represented, MacTiernan failed to be elected.

On 13 August 2010, the Speaker of the Western Australian Legislative Assembly issued a writ directing the Electoral Commissioner to proceed with an election in the district. Tony Buti, a law professor at the University of Western Australia and chairman of the Armadale Redevelopment Authority, won the Labor preselection unopposed. The Liberals opted not to field a candidate.

The seat of Armadale, first established in 1983, is considered to be a safe seat for the Labor Party, with just two other members since its creation—former Minister for Transport and Minister for Environment Bob Pearce until 1993, then former Minister for Education and Deputy Opposition Leader Kay Hallahan until 1996. Commentators viewed the by-election as a non-event, and the Liberal Party, in minority government in Western Australia since 2008, opted not to contest the seat — they had never polled well in the seat, and did not run a candidate in the 2001 election either.

== Timeline ==
Date	Event
19 July 2010	Alannah MacTiernan resigned, vacating the seat of Armadale.
13 August 2010	Writs were issued by the Speaker of the Legislative Assembly to proceed with a by-election.
20 August 2010	Close of nominations and draw of ballot papers.
2 October 2010	Polling day, between the hours of 8am and 6pm.
3 November 2010	The last day on which the writ can be returned and the results formally declared.

== Candidates ==
Four candidates contested the by-election. In ballot-paper order, they were:

- Labor Party — Tony Buti, a Professor in Law from the University of Western Australia and chairman of the Armadale Redevelopment Authority;
- Christian Democratic Party — Jamie van Burgel, a 27-year-old property valuer;
- Independent — John Tucak, a perennial contestant and campaigner against bureaucracy in the Ministry of Planning; and
- Greens Western Australia — Owen Davies Jr, a local boilermaker.

The Liberal Party did not field a candidate.

== Results ==
Declared results are as follows:

Armadale state by-election, 2010
Party	Candidate	Votes	%	±%
Labor	Tony Buti	10,021	57.90	+1.94
Christian Democrats	Jamie van Burgel	3,561	20.57	+13.27
Greens	Owen Davies	2,220	12.83	+2.01
Independent	John Tucak	1,506	8.70	+8.70
Total formal votes		17,308	94.65	+0.61
Informal votes		978	5.35	–0.61
Turnout		18,286	75.21	−10.68
Two-candidate-preferred result
Labor	Tony Buti	12,159	70.29	+5.44
Christian Democrats	Jamie van Burgel	5,140	29.71	N/A
Labor hold		Swing	N/A	
