= Walter Jones (Australian politician) =

Australian politician

Member of the Legislative Assembly of Western Australia
- In office 29 September 1917 – 12 March 1921
- Preceded by: William Carpenter
- Succeeded by: Frank Gibson
- Constituency: Fremantle

Personal details
- Born: 2 October 1885 Sedgley, Staffordshire, England
- Died: 16 January 1924 (aged 38) Fremantle, Western Australia, Australia
- Party: Labor

Walter Leonard "Ben" Jones (2 October 1885 – 16 January 1924) was an Australian politician who served as a Labor Party member of the Legislative Assembly of Western Australia from 1917 to 1921, representing the seat of Fremantle.

Jones was born in Sedgley, Staffordshire, England, to Elizabeth Mary (née Simpson) and James Jones. He studied to become a minister at the University of Birmingham but did not complete his course, instead moving to Western Australia in 1905. Jones worked as an auctioneer and insurance agent, and also became an organiser for the Labor Party, running John McDonald's campaign at the 1911 state election and Alick McCallum's campaign at the 1913 federal election. He enlisted in the Australian Naval and Military Expeditionary Force in August 1915, and served in New Guinea until being discharged due to ill health in May 1917.

After leaving the military, Jones arrived back in Australia in time to contest the 1917 state election, where he defeated William Carpenter of the National Labor Party in Fremantle. In 1919, in the aftermath of the Fremantle wharf riot, he was twice fined for giving speeches on the Fremantle Esplanade without the permission of the Fremantle Municipal Council. His subsequent unsuccessful appeals prompted a debate about freedom of speech. At the 1921 state election, Jones was defeated by a Nationalist candidate, Frank Gibson. He was taken ill in the middle of 1923, and died in Fremantle in January 1924, aged 38. He had married Winifred Alwina Ninke in 1915, with whom he had one daughter.

Parliament of Western Australia
Preceded by William Carpenter	Member for Fremantle; 1917–1921	Succeeded by Frank Gibson
