= Barbara Scott =

Barbara Scott may refer to:

- Barbara Scott (Australian politician)
- Barbara Ann Scott, Canadian figure skater
- Barbara Starr Scott, Cherokee politician
