= Brad Pettitt =

Australian politician (born 1972)

The Honourable Brad Pettitt MLC
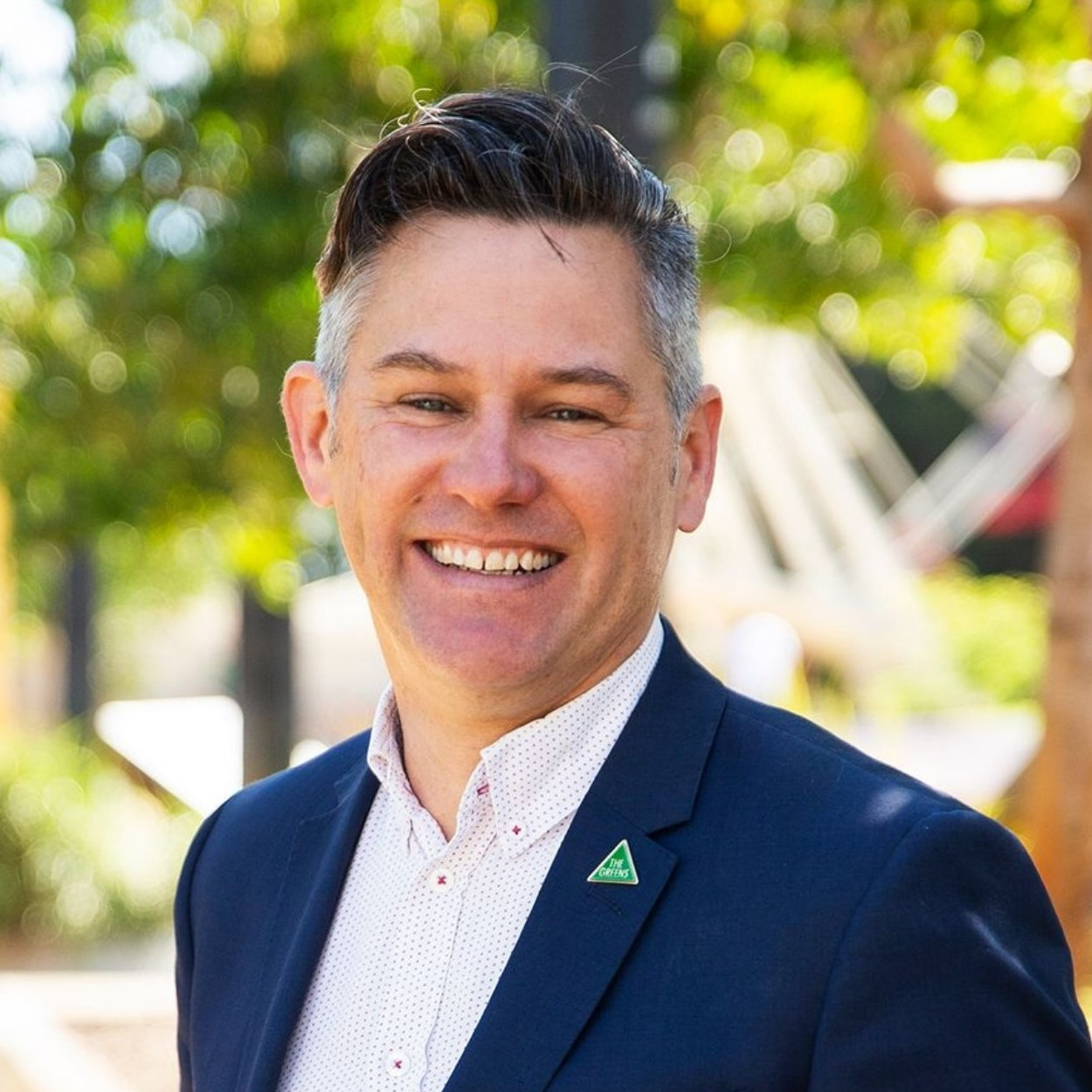
- Pettitt in 2021

Parliamentary leader of the Greens (WA)
- Incumbent
- Assumed office March 2025
- Preceded by: None

Member of the Western Australian Legislative Council
- Incumbent
- Assumed office 22 May 2025

Member of the Western Australian Legislative Council
- In office 22 May 2021 – 21 May 2025
- Preceded by: Simon O'Brien
- Succeeded by: Constituency abolished
- Constituency: South Metropolitan Region

Mayor of Fremantle
- In office 17 October 2009 – 6 April 2021
- Preceded by: Peter Tagliaferri
- Succeeded by: Hannah Fitzhardinge

Personal details
- Born: Bradley William Pettitt; 14 July 1972 (age 54) Western Australia
- Party: Greens (WA)
- Education: Murdoch University
- Occupation: Politician, academic
- Website: bradpettitt.com

Bradley William Pettitt (born 14 July 1972) is an Australian politician and former academic. A member of Greens (WA), he has served as a member of the Western Australian Legislative Council since 2021, and since 2025 represents Western Australia as a whole, following electoral reforms that removed regional boundaries in the upper house, as well as the party's parliamentary leader. Prior to entering state politics, Pettitt was the Mayor of Fremantle from 2009 to 2021 and a Fremantle city councillor from 2005 to 2009.

== Early life and education ==
Pettitt was born in Western Australia and studied at Murdoch University, where he completed a PhD in urban sustainability, focusing on sustainable development, climate change, and environmental policy.

== Career ==
Before becoming Mayor of Fremantle, Pettitt worked as the Dean of the School of Sustainability at Murdoch University, where he taught and conducted research on urban planning, sustainability, and climate policy.

He also worked as an urban planning and sustainability consultant, advising on environmental policy, sustainable development, and climate change adaptation in both public and private sectors.

=== City of Fremantle (2005–2021) ===
Pettitt was elected to a four year term on the City of Fremantle council in May 2005.

Pettitt was elected Mayor of Fremantle in 2009 and was re-elected in 2013 and 2017. During his tenure, he focused on sustainability initiatives, climate action, homelessness, and urban revitalization. He played a key role in promoting renewable energy, sustainable transport, and local economic development. He stepped down in 2021 to run for the Western Australian Legislative Council.

== State Parliament (2021–present) ==
At the 2021 Western Australian state election, Pettitt was elected to the Western Australian Legislative Council as the sole member of the Greens Western Australia in the upper house. He has been an advocate for climate action, sustainable development, and social justice policies.

Pettitt was re-elected at the 2025 state election alongside three other Greens MPs, giving the Greens the balance of power in the Legislative Council.

== Political positions ==
Pettitt has been a vocal supporter of:

- Climate policies, including phasing out fossil fuels and transitioning to renewable energy
- Sustainable urban development and improved public transport
- Affordable housing and stronger social safety nets
- Greater transparency in government decision-making

== Personal life ==
Outside of politics, Pettitt enjoys cycling, drinking coffee, and spending time with his daughter.

Civic offices
Preceded by Peter Tagliaferri	Mayor of Fremantle; 2009–2021	Succeeded by Hannah Fitzhardinge
