= John Troy (Australian politician) =

Australian politician (born 1941)

Dr John Troy MBBS

Member of the Western Australian Parliament for Fremantle
- In office 1977–1980
- Preceded by: Harry Fletcher
- Succeeded by: David Parker

Personal details
- Born: John Robert Troy; 23 September 1941 (age 85) Beaconsfield, Western Australia
- Citizenship: Australian
- Party: Communist Party of Australia (1960s); Labor Party 1974–1987; Independent 1987–
- Spouse(s): Virginia Petersen (1969–?); Raylene Morley (1983–)
- Education: University of Western Australia
- Profession: Medical doctor

John Robert Troy (born 23 September 1941) was an Australian politician, and a member of the Western Australian Legislative Assembly from 1977 until 1980 representing the seat of Fremantle.

== Biography ==
Troy was born in Beaconsfield, an inner suburb of Fremantle, Western Australia, to Paddy Troy, a seaman, union secretary and state leader of the Communist Party of Australia, and Mabel (née Neilson). He was educated at East Fremantle Primary School and at Fremantle Boys' School before commencing as a student in Engineering at the University of Western Australia. He undertook casual work on the docks between 1959 and 1961 before becoming a trainee engineman on the railways and ultimately a qualified fireman. He was involved in the Locomotive Engine Drivers' and Firemen's Union, and also with the Seamen's Union. For a time in the 1960s, he was a member of the Communist Party and the Eureka Youth League, and played hockey with the North Fremantle Hockey Club. On 21 December 1969, he married his first wife, Virginia Petersen, with whom he was to have one son and one daughter.

In the early 1970s, he completed his medical degree at the University of Western Australia. He was a resident doctor at Sir Charles Gairdner Hospital for 18 months before going on to Princess Margaret Hospital for Children in 1975–1976. He was a member of the Hospital Employees' Union during this time.

In 1974, he joined the Labor Party. At the 1977 election he contested the safe Labor seat of Fremantle in the Western Australian Legislative Assembly following the retirement of the member, Harry Fletcher. He made the headlines on a number of occasions—months after his election. In June 1977, he and 21 other people, including two senior Transport Workers Union officials, were arrested on the charge of "obstructing traffic" after a mêlée when a fuel agent attempted to break a union picket line at a North Fremantle dock. He later became well known, and even attracted censure from the Labor caucus, for his public advocacy in support of the Palestinians. In November 1978, the ALP state executive denied him preselection for the 1980 election, awarding it to 25-year-old David Parker instead. The Seamen's Union and the Waterside Workers Federation suggested they might reduce their contributions to the ALP as a result, and a Victorian party member complained to the party's national executive about alleged Zionism in the Western Australian branch.

Dr Troy practised medicine as a general practitioner in Fremantle after leaving politics. On 10 December 1983, he married his second wife, Raylene (née Morley), with whom he had two sons. He left the Labor Party in 1987, and at the 1989 election and at a by-election for the Fremantle seat the following year, he ran as an independent, attracting 12.84% and 9.28% of the vote respectively.

Preceded by Harry Fletcher	Member for Fremantle; 1977–1980	Succeeded by David Parker
