= Chrissy Sharp =

Australian politician (1947–2021)

The Honourable Chrissy Sharp
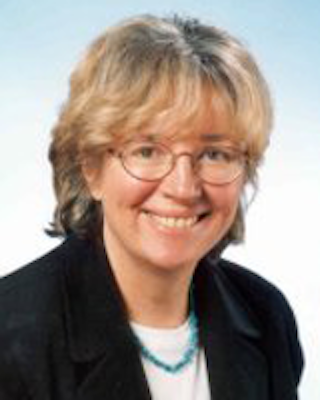

Member of the Western Australian Parliament for South West Region
- In office 22 May 1997 – 21 May 2005

Personal details
- Born: 18 November 1947 London, England
- Died: 18 May 2021 (aged 73) Bridgetown, Western Australia
- Citizenship: Australian
- Party: Greens Western Australia
- Education: University of Sheffield (BA); University of Kent (MA); Murdoch University (PhD)
- Occupation: Politician, environmentalist, journalist
- Committees: Environmental Protection Authority of Western Australia (1989–1995)

Christine "Chrissy" Sharp (18 November 1947 – 18 May 2021) was an Australian politician, environmentalist, and journalist. She was a member of the Western Australian Legislative Council for the Greens Western Australia from 1997 to 2005, representing the South West Region.

== Early life ==
Christine Sharp was born on 18 November 1947 in London, England. She completed a Bachelor of Arts with Honours at the University of Sheffield and a Master of Arts in Political Science at the University of Kent.

In her early adulthood, Sharp travelled extensively before settling in Western Australia in 1973. She later undertook doctoral studies at Murdoch University, completing a PhD in 1983 on the politics and ethics of old-growth forest logging.

Between 1974 and 1975, Sharp worked as a journalist with the Australian Broadcasting Corporation (ABC). Her reporting on police treatment of Aboriginal people at Skull Creek near Laverton contributed to the launch of a Royal Commission and the establishment of Aboriginal police aides in the state. During this time, she also became an outspoken activist in Western Australia's emerging forest conservation movement.

In 1977, she and her partner relocated from Perth to a small property in Balingup, where they founded a sustainable tree farming enterprise. The farm became a long-term base for her environmental and political work.

Sharp was appointed to the Environmental Protection Authority of Western Australia) in 1989, becoming its first female member. She served until 1995, resigning over concerns with the state's logging policies.

== Political career ==
Sharp began her political career in local government, serving as a councillor on the Donnybrook–Balingup Shire Council from 1983 to 1985. In the 1989 state election, she contributed to policy development for Greens WA candidate Louise Duxbury, who contested the South West Region.

A founding member of the Greens (WA), Sharp stood for election in the Western Australian Legislative Council at the 1996 state election. She was elected as a representative for the South West Region and commenced her term on 22 May 1997. She was re-elected in 2001 and served until 21 May 2005, when she retired from politics.

During her time in parliament, Sharp chaired the Standing Committee on Ecologically Sustainable Development (1997–2001), becoming the first woman to chair a standing committee in the Western Australian Parliament. From 2001 to 2005, she chaired the Standing Committee on Environment and Public Affairs. Under her leadership, the committees conducted 15 inquiries, including three into native forest logging practices, contributing to major reforms in forest management and the eventual end of old-growth logging in the state.

== Death and legacy ==
Chrissy Sharp died on 18 May 2021 in Bridgetown, Western Australia, at the age of 73.

She was remembered as a pioneering environmentalist and advocate for sustainable forestry. Her legacy includes her leadership in halting old-growth logging, her contributions to parliamentary environmental policy, and her stewardship of the Golden Valley Tree Park in Balingup, which she helped develop into Western Australia's largest arboretum.
