= Peter Tagliaferri =

Australian politician

Mayor of the City of Fremantle
- In office 2001–2009
- Preceded by: Richard Utting
- Succeeded by: Brad Pettitt

Personal details
- Born: 1960 (age 65–66) East Fremantle, Western Australia
- Citizenship: Australian
- Party: Labor Party
- Spouse: Albina

Peter Tagliaferri (born 2 November 1960) is an Australian politician. He is a former mayor of the City of Fremantle, a position he held for eight and a half years.

== Background ==
Tagliaferri's grandfather migrated to Australia in 1932 and, after working in the mines for seven years, his father Osvaldo also migrated. Osvaldo died of leukemia in 1983 when Tagliaferri was a 23-year-old, leaving him with the responsibility of family, mortgage and the family business (Interfoods).

He was born in East Fremantle, and educated at Lady of Fatima in Palmyra, St Brendan's in Beaconsfield and in 1977 graduated from Christian Brothers College, Fremantle. His background is retailing, manufacturing and farming in York.

== Career ==
Tagliaferri first involvement with local government came that same year, in an effort to speak up for the concerns of southern suburbs residents, oppose a highway through Beaconsfield and address parking and retail issues.

He was first elected to council in 1983; representing the East Ward, at the time becoming the youngest person ever elected to local government in Western Australia. He was elected mayor in 2001 and re-elected in 2005 — the first mayor to be re-elected since John Cattalini, who served from 1984 to 1994.

Tagliaferri's principal platform in the 2001 mayoral election was reclaiming Fremantle for its residents, strong financial management and an open-door policy. He was elected in by 1000 votes and was successfully re-elected as mayor in 2005, winning 62% of the 8711 votes.

In 2003, he was awarded the Centenary Medal and in 2004 was awarded the Champion for the Year of the Built Environment. He received the Heart Foundation President's Award in 2007 in recognition of work to ensure a smoke-free environment in Fremantle and is patron of The One World Project, as well as being a Mayor for Peace.

Prior to the 2007 federal election, Tagliaferri criticised the Labor Party's selection of Melissa Parke to succeed outgoing member Carmen Lawrence in the federal division of Fremantle. Tagliaferri was unhappy with Parke's selection because she came from outside the district and threatened to stand as an independent against her. He subsequently declined to run, and Parke won the seat easily.

The long-running state member for Fremantle, Jim McGinty, announced his retirement on 3 April 2009. Tagliaferri immediately emerged as the favourite to win Labor preselection in the Fremantle by-election, and was unanimously preselected by the state administrative committee on 7 April. He was defeated by Greens challenger Adele Carles on 16 May - the first time a Labor candidate has lost in Fremantle since 1924. He chose not to run for mayor again in the October 2009 elections, after two successful terms, and was succeeded by Brad Pettitt.

He went on to run a hotel in Manjimup in the south of Western Australia.
