= Harry Fletcher (politician) =

Australian politician (1910–1990)

Member of the Legislative Assembly of Western Australia
- In office 21 March 1959 – 19 February 1977
- Preceded by: Joseph Sleeman
- Succeeded by: John Troy
- Constituency: Fremantle

Personal details
- Born: 28 May 1910 Melbourne, Victoria, Australia
- Died: 17 October 1990 (aged 80) Hilton, Western Australia, Australia
- Party: Labor

Harry Arthur Fletcher (28 May 1910 – 17 October 1990) was an Australian politician who was a Labor Party member of the Legislative Assembly of Western Australia from 1959 to 1977, representing the seat of Fremantle.

Fletcher was born in Melbourne, but moved to Perth with his parents as an infant. After leaving school, he worked a variety of odd jobs, and travelled around the state, spending time in the Goldfields, the Mid West (in Meekatharra), and the Kimberley (on Koolan Island). Fletcher enlisted in the Royal Australian Navy in July 1941, and during the war served on HMAS Bungaree and HMAS Paterson as an engine room artificer. He returned to Perth after the war's end, initially working as a fitter at the Midland Railway Workshops, and then later at the East Perth and South Fremantle Power Stations. A shop steward for the Amalgamated Engineering Union and a long-time member of the Labor Party, Fletcher was elected to parliament at the 1959 state election, replacing the retiring Joseph Sleeman. He served as deputy chairman of committees from 1972 to 1973, in the government of John Tonkin, and retired at the 1977 election.

Parliament of Western Australia
Preceded by Joseph Sleeman	Member for Fremantle; 1959–1977	Succeeded by John Troy
