= 1990 Fremantle state by-election =

Western Australian parliamentary by-election

The 1990 Fremantle state by-election was a by-election held on 26 May 1990 for the Western Australian Legislative Assembly seat of Fremantle. The election occurred on the same day as the 1990 Maylands state by-election.

The by-election was triggered by the resignation of Labor member and former Deputy Premier David Parker on 26 April 1990.

The seat of Fremantle, first established in 1890, was considered to be a safe seat for the Labor Party.

== Timeline ==
Date	Event
26 April 1990	David Parker resigned, vacating the seat of Fremantle.
26 April 1990	Writs were issued by the Speaker of the Legislative Assembly to proceed with a by-election.
4 May 1990	Close of nominations and draw of ballot papers.
26 May 1990	Polling day, between the hours of 8am and 6pm.
6 June 1990	The writ was returned and the results formally declared .

== Candidates ==
The by-election attracted eleven candidates. Of these, four were notable—Jim McGinty, the Labor candidate, was the secretary of the Miscellaneous Workers' Union. Arthur Marshall, the Liberal candidate, was a veteran sports commentator for the Seven Network who had also founded a tennis academy. Christabel Chamarette, for the new Greens WA party, was a psychologist and social worker. John Troy was the former Labor member for the seat from 1977 to 1980.

== Results ==
Jim McGinty held the seat for the Labor Party. Despite winning the seat comfortably, his votes trailed those of the Liberal candidate by several hundred votes until the tenth count, when the Greens preferences and through them the majority of John Troy's preferences were distributed.

Fremantle state by-election, 1990
Party	Candidate	Votes	%	±%
Liberal	Arthur Marshall	6,356	35.70	+5.40
Labor	Jim McGinty	6,009	33.75	−8.89
Greens	Christabel Chamarette	2,209	12.41	+7.51
	John Troy	1,652	9.58	−3.26
Independent	Peter Tagliaferri	645	3.62	+3.62
Democrats	Peter Nettleton	293	1.65	−3.46
Independent	Philip Hooper	266	1.49	+1.49
Independent	Marie Murray	105	0.59	+0.59
Independent	Jeff Brockway	103	0.58	+0.58
Grey Power	Richard Finney	96	0.54	−3.66
Independent	Alfred Bussell	68	0.38	+0.38
Total formal votes		17,802	94.72	+5.15
Informal votes		992	5.28	−5.15
Turnout		18,794	82.46	−7.34
Two-party-preferred result
Labor	Jim McGinty	9,770	54.88	−7.53
Liberal	Arthur Marshall	8,032	45.12	+7.53
Labor hold		Swing	−7.53	
