= Tony Buti =

Australian politician (born 1961)

The Honourable Tony Buti MLA
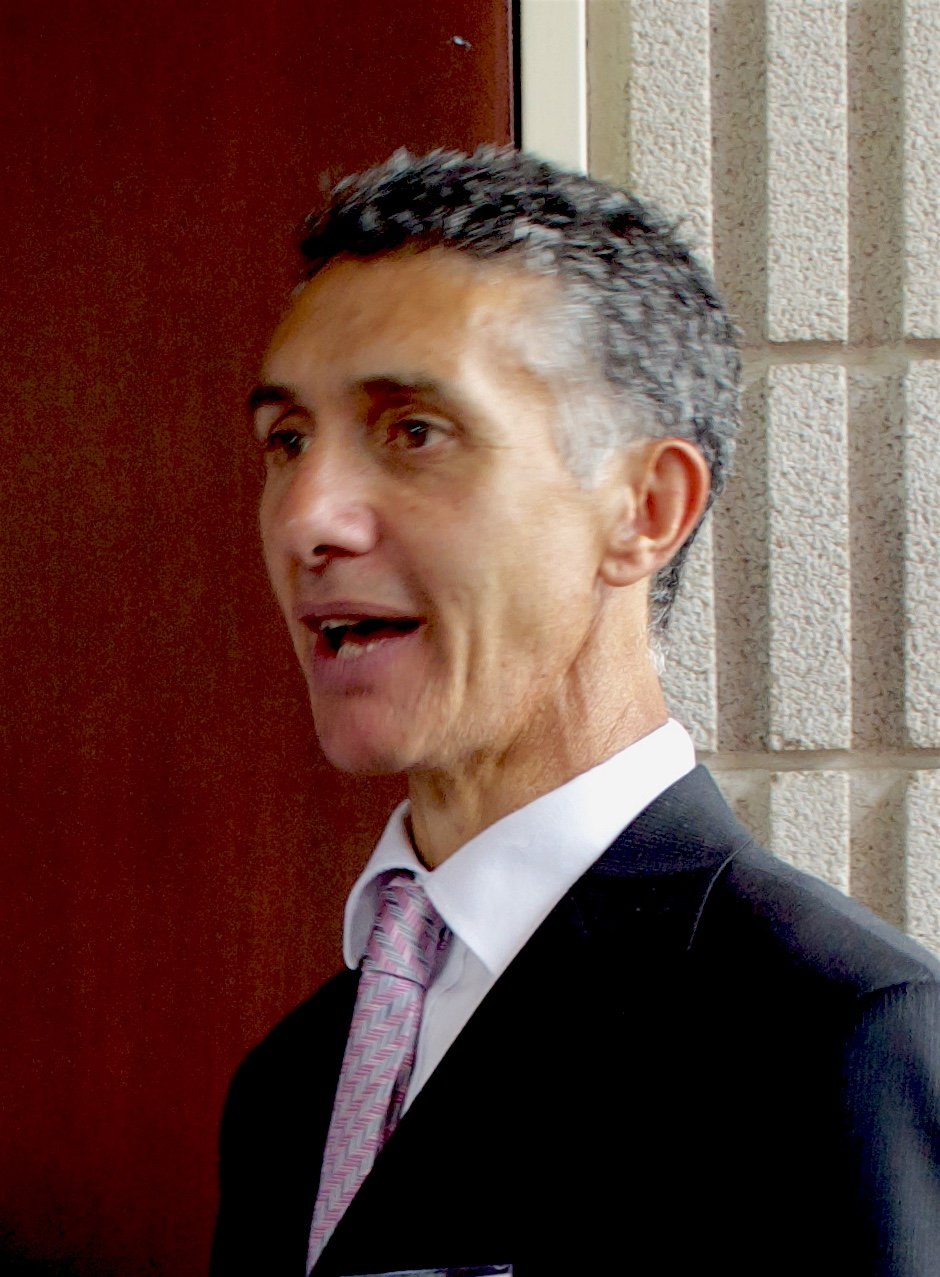

Attorney-General of Western Australia
- Incumbent
- Assumed office 19 March 2025
- Premier: Roger Cook
- Preceded by: John Quigley

Minister for Corrective Services
- Designate
- Assuming office 13 July 2026
- Premier: Roger Cook
- Succeeding: Paul Papalia

Minister for Commerce
- Incumbent
- Assumed office 19 March 2025
- Preceded by: Sue Ellery

Minister for Tertiary and International Education
- Incumbent
- Assumed office 19 March 2025
- Premier: Roger Cook
- Preceded by: David Templeman (as Minister for International Education)

Minister for Multicultural Interests
- Incumbent
- Assumed office 14 December 2022
- Premier: Roger Cook
- Preceded by: Himself (as Minister for Citizenship and Multicultural Interests)

Minister for Education
- In office 14 December 2022 – 19 March 2025
- Premier: Mark McGowan; Roger Cook
- Preceded by: Sue Ellery
- Succeeded by: Sabine Winton

Minister for Aboriginal Affairs
- In office 21 December 2021 – 8 June 2023
- Premier: Mark McGowan; Roger Cook
- Preceded by: Stephen Dawson
- Succeeded by: Don Punch

Minister for Racing and Gaming
- In office 21 December 2021 – 14 December 2022
- Premier: Mark McGowan
- Preceded by: Paul Papalia
- Succeeded by: Reece Whitby

Minister for Citizenship and Multicultural Interests
- In office 21 December 2021 – 19 March 2025
- Premier: Mark McGowan; Roger Cook
- Preceded by: Paul Papalia
- Succeeded by: Himself (as Minister for Multicultural Interests)

Minister for Finance
- In office 19 March 2021 – 14 December 2022
- Premier: Mark McGowan
- Preceded by: Ben Wyatt
- Succeeded by: Sue Ellery

Minister for Lands
- In office 19 March 2021 – 21 December 2021
- Premier: Mark McGowan
- Preceded by: Ben Wyatt
- Succeeded by: John Carey

Minister for Sport and Recreation
- In office 19 March 2021 – 21 December 2021
- Premier: Mark McGowan
- Preceded by: Mick Murray
- Succeeded by: David Templeman

Member of the Legislative Assembly of Western Australia
- Incumbent
- Assumed office 2 October 2010
- Preceded by: Alannah MacTiernan
- Constituency: Armadale

Personal details
- Born: 20 August 1961 (age 65) Collie, Western Australia
- Party: Labor Party
- Occupation: University lecturer
- Website: www.antoniobuti.com

Antonio De Paulo "Tony" Buti (Note: Italian pronunciation: [anˈtɔːnjo de ˈpaulo ˈbuːti].) (born 20 August 1961) is an Australian politician. He has been a Labor Party member of the Western Australian Legislative Assembly representing the seat of Armadale since 2 October 2010, when he was elected in a by-election.

In the 1980s, Buti was a secondary school teacher. Buti attended the University of Western Australia and later the Australian National University, where he studied law, receiving his LL.B in 1992. He completed his DPhil, which dealt with guardianship law and the Stolen Generations, at Wolfson College, Oxford University in 2003. From 1997, Buti lectured at the School of Law in Murdoch University. He is the author of several books on the removal of Aboriginal children from their families, as well as sports law. Another book he wrote was an overview of the Perth Mint Swindle in 2011. He also wrote a biography of Sir Ronald Wilson.

He was also chairman of the Armadale Redevelopment Authority prior to the reformation of the Redevelopment Authorities into the Metropolitan Redevelopment Authority, and subsequently, DevelopmentWA.

In 2010, following Labor frontbencher Alannah MacTiernan's resignation from the state Parliament to contest the federal seat of Canning at the 2010 federal election, Buti was preselected as Labor's candidate for the 2010 Armadale state by-election. He won the seat easily with 57.9% of the primary vote and a two-party-preferred vote of 70.6% versus the Christian Democratic Party (the governing Liberal Party did not run a candidate).

Following the 2021 Western Australian state election, Buti was formally sworn in as minister for finance; lands; sport and recreation; citizenship and multicultural interests on 19 March 2021. On 14 December 2022, following a cabinet reshuffle, Buti became minister for education, minister for Aboriginal affairs, and minister for citizenship and multicultural interests.

Buti was re-elected in the 2025 Western Australian state election.

== Bibliography ==
- Buti, Antonio (2025). A Considered Act : how Voluntary Assisted Dying became legal in Western Australia. North Melbourne: Arcadia, an imprint of Australian Scholarly Publishing. p. 264. ISBN 9781923267343.
- Buti, Antonio (2021). Alkira. North Melbourne: Arcadia, an imprint of Australian Scholarly Publishing. p. 194. ISBN 9781922669193.
- Buti, Antonio (2019). Stolen Life : The Bruce Trevorrow Case. Fremantle Press. p. 289. ISBN 9781925815115.
- Buti, Antonio (2018). Sports Law. Oxford University Press. p. 887. ISBN 9780190309855. (with David Thorpe, Chris Davies and Paul Jonson)
- Buti, Antonio (2013). Sports Law. Oxford University Press. p. 668. ISBN 9780195518528. (with David Thorpe, Chris Davies, Saul Fridman and Paul Jonson)
- Buti, Antonio (2011). Brothers : Justice, Corruption and the Mickelbergs. Fremantle Press. p. 302. ISBN 9781925815085.
- Buti, Antonio (2007). A Matter of Conscience : Sir Ronald Wilson. University of Western Australia Press. p. 474. ISBN 9780980296419.
- Buti, Antonio (2004). Separated : Australian Aboriginal Childhood Separations and Guardianship Law. Sydney Institute of Criminology. p. 233. ISBN 9780975196724.
- Buti, Antonio (2001). Drugs, Sport and the Law. Scribblers Publishing. p. 157. ISBN 9780958672788. (with Saul Fridman)

== Notes ==
Western Australian Legislative Assembly
Preceded by Alannah MacTiernan	Member for Armadale; 2010–present	Incumbent
