= Adele Carles =

Australian politician

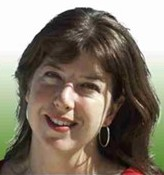

Member of the Western Australian Parliament for Fremantle
- In office 16 May 2009 – 9 March 2013
- Preceded by: Jim McGinty
- Succeeded by: Simone McGurk

Personal details
- Born: Adele Simone Carles; 19 February 1968 (age 58) Kalgoorlie, Western Australia
- Citizenship: Australian
- Party: Independent (since 2010)
- Other political affiliations: Greens Western Australia (until 2010)
- Spouse: Francois Carles
- Domestic partner: Troy Buswell (2010-2012)
- Profession: Lawyer

Adele Simone Carles (born 19 February 1968) is an Australian former politician. She was a member of the Western Australian Legislative Assembly from 2009 to 2013, representing the electorate of Fremantle. She was initially elected as a Greens WA member at the 2009 Fremantle state by-election, becoming the first Greens candidate to be elected to an Australian state lower house of parliament in a single-member seat. However, she resigned from the Greens on 6 May 2010 to sit as an independent. In November 2010, Carles agreed to guarantee confidence and supply votes for the incumbent Colin Barnett Liberal minority government. She ran for re-election as an independent at the 2013 state election, but was defeated, finishing fourth behind the Labor, Liberal and Greens candidates with 5.49% of the vote.

== 2008 state election ==
Carles, a solicitor before entering politics, was defeated in the 2008 state election. She polled 27.6% of the vote against Labor Attorney-General Jim McGinty (38.7%), marginally less than Liberal candidate Brian Christie (30.2%).

== 2009 Fremantle by-election ==
In 2009, Carles was preselected by Greens WA to run again at the 2009 Fremantle state by-election following the retirement of McGinty. With the Liberals not contesting the election, Carles was rated a chance of becoming the first Greens candidate to be elected to an Australian state lower house of parliament in a single-member seat.

Carles won the seat with 44.06% of the primary vote, ahead of Labor candidate and former Fremantle Mayor, Peter Tagliaferri, as well as receiving enough preferences from other candidates to gain an absolute majority of ballots cast. This was the highest primary vote result for the Greens in a state or federal election in Australia, and the first time the Greens had outpolled all other parties on their primary vote. Their previous record vote was 38.96% in the 2005 Marrickville state by-election in New South Wales (also not contested by the Liberals).

== Buswell affair ==
In April 2010, Carles publicly acknowledged that she and Liberal Treasurer, Troy Buswell, had been engaged in a "mutual, albeit stupid" affair that lasted several months. Carles had previously denied the affair despite persistent rumours, claiming to be a victim of a Labor smear campaign.

On 6 May 2010, she resigned from the Greens to sit as an independent.

In December 2012, Buswell launched a $3 million defamation case against Carles in relation to allegations and counter-claims both made about Buswell's alleged lewd and drunken behaviour at the home of property developer Nigel Satterley in December 2011.

At the 9 March 2013 state election Carles was defeated by Labor's Simone McGurk. She finished second from last with only five percent of the primary vote.

She ran for mayor of Fremantle in 2021 but lost to Hannah Fitzhardinge.

Western Australian Legislative Assembly
Preceded by Jim McGinty	Member for Fremantle; 2009–2013	Succeeded by Simone McGurk
