= 2009 Fremantle state by-election =

Western Australian state by-election

- 16 May 2009
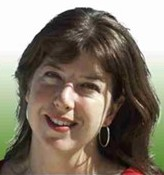

	First party	Second party
Candidate	Adele Carles	Peter Tagliaferri
Party	Greens	Labor
Popular vote	8,722	7,632
Percentage	44.06%	38.55%
Swing	▲16.50	▼0.14
TPP	53.96%	46.04%
TPP swing	▲53.96	▼15.97
MP before election
Jim McGinty
Labor
Elected MP
Adele Carles
Greens

The 2009 Fremantle state by-election was held in the Western Australian Legislative Assembly district of Fremantle on 16 May 2009. It was triggered by the resignation of sitting member Jim McGinty.

The Labor Party was defending a seat that they had held continuously since 1924. The by-election was held in conjunction with the state referendum on daylight saving hours.

The Greens candidate, Adele Carles, won the by-election, and in doing so became the first Greens candidate to be elected to an Australian state lower house of parliament in a single-member seat.

== Background ==
First elected to parliament at the 1990 Fremantle state by-election, McGinty became a minister in the Labor government of Carmen Lawrence in 1991. He held several portfolios until Labor's defeat at the 1993 state election. In Opposition, McGinty succeeded Ian Taylor as Labor leader in 1994, only to be replaced by Geoff Gallop prior to the 1996 state election. After Labor returned to power at the 2001 state election, McGinty again became a minister. Most significantly he served for seven and half years as Attorney-General in the Labor governments of Geoff Gallop and Alan Carpenter.

Following Labor's defeat at the 2008 state election, speculation among media and political commentators was that McGinty, by then almost 60 years of age, would resign his seat before the end of the term. He confirmed that speculation on 3 April 2009.

== Candidates ==
Nominations closed on 17 April 2009. Later that day, the Western Australian Electoral Commission revealed the names of the candidates who nominated. They are as follows, in ballot paper order:

- Independent - Nik Varga, a real estate agent.
- Citizens Electoral Council - Rob Totten.
- Independent - Jan Ter Horst.
- Independent - Carmelo Zagami. Zagami previously stood as the Liberal Party candidate for the federal division of Fremantle at the 2004 federal election.
- Independent - Steve Boni. Boni previously stood as the Labor candidate for the district of Roe at the 2001 state election.
- Family First - Andriette du Plessis. Du Plessis previously stood as the Family First candidate for the federal division of Fremantle at the 2007 federal election.
- Labor Party - Peter Tagliaferri, Mayor of Fremantle. Tagiliaferri previously stood for this seat as an independent candidate at the 1990 Fremantle state by-election.
- Christian Democratic Party - Julie Hollett.
- Independent - Rosemary Anne Lorrimar, a nurse who previously ran for the Christian Democratic Party in Willagee in 2001 state election. She also stood in several elections for the DLP in the 1970s.
- Greens WA - Adele Carles. Carles was also the Greens candidate for Fremantle at the 2008 state election and came close to defeating McGinty.
- Sam Wainwright, standing for the Socialist Alliance, which is not registered as an official party.

The Liberal Party did not field a candidate.

== Results ==
The Greens' win in Fremantle was the first time a Greens candidate was elected to an Australian state lower house of parliament in a single-member seat. It was also the first time they had outpolled the Labor Party on the primary vote in any Labor-held seat. Carles became the first Green to sit in the Western Australian Legislative Assembly, and with five members in the Parliament as a whole, the Greens achieved official parliamentary party status in Western Australia, giving them access to additional allowances, monies and staff. Carles later quit the party to sit as an independent after the publication of an affair with Liberal treasurer Troy Buswell.

Fremantle state by-election, 2009
Party	Candidate	Votes	%	±%
Greens	Adele Carles	8,722	44.06	+16.50
Labor	Peter Tagliaferri	7,632	38.55	−0.14
Independent	Carmelo Zagami	999	5.05	+5.05
Independent	Nik Varga	701	3.54	+3.54
Independent Socialist Alliance	Sam Wainwright	454	2.29	+2.29
Independent	Steve Boni	340	1.72	+1.72
Christian Democrats	Julie Hollett	339	1.71	−0.15
Family First	Andriette du Plessis	194	0.98	−0.71
Independent	Jan Ter Horst	188	0.95	+0.95
Independent	Rosemary Anne Lorrimar	171	0.86	+0.86
Citizens Electoral Council	Rob Totten	56	0.28	+0.28
Total formal votes		19,796	95.71	+1.38
Informal votes		888	4.29	–1.38
Turnout		20,684	87.20	+2.81
Two-candidate-preferred result
Greens	Adele Carles	10,664	53.96	+53.96
Labor	Peter Tagliaferri	9,100	46.04	−15.97
Greens gain from Labor		Swing	N/A	
