= Electoral district of Fremantle =

State electoral district of Western Australia

Fremantle
- Interactive map of electoral district boundaries from the 2025 state election
- Dates current: 1890–present
- MP: Simone McGurk
- Party: Labor
- Namesake: Fremantle
- Electors: 30,650 (2025)
- Area: 41 km^{2} (15.8 sq mi)
- Demographic: Metropolitan
- Coordinates: 32.07°S 115.76°E
Electorates around Fremantle:
Indian Ocean	Cottesloe	Bicton
Indian Ocean	Fremantle	Bibra Lake
Indian Ocean	Cockburn	Cockburn

Fremantle is an electoral district of the Legislative Assembly in the Australian state of Western Australia.

The district is located in the inner south-west of Perth, centring on the port of Fremantle.

Fremantle is a historically safe Labor seat, though the Greens WA have polled well in recent times. Labor held the seat from 1924 until a 2009 by-election which was lost to Greens candidate Adele Carles. Carles quit the party in the following year, sitting as an independent for the remainder of her term. The seat returned to Labor at the 2013 election.

== Geography ==
Fremantle is a north–south elongated electorate. It is bounded to the north by the Swan River and to the west by the Indian Ocean. A series of roads make up the district's short southern and long eastern boundary. The district takes in the suburbs of Beaconsfield, East Fremantle, Fremantle, North Coogee, South Fremantle and White Gum Valley, as well as parts of the suburbs of Bicton, Hamilton Hill, Palmyra and Spearwood. The district also includes Rottnest Island.

== History ==
Created for the 1890 election, Fremantle was one of the original 30 districts of the Western Australian Legislative Assembly. It has remained as an electorate ever since. In its early years, the seat changed hands regularly between different candidates. However, the seat became more favourable to the Labor Party in the early 20th century, and has been held by the Labor Party at all times between 1924 and 2021, except from 2009 to 2013.

Fremantle's longest-serving member was Joseph Sleeman, member for 35 years from 1924 to 1959. David Parker, member for Fremantle from 1980 to 1990, served as Deputy Premier of Western Australia under Premier Peter Dowding from 1988 to 1990. The seat's member until his retirement in 2009 was Jim McGinty, who was the Opposition Leader from 1994 to 1996 and Attorney-General in the Gallop and Carpenter governments from 2001 to 2008. He was replaced in the 2009 Fremantle state by-election by Greens candidate Adele Carles, who won the seat having outpolled Labor on the primary vote, and gaining sufficient preference flow to fill McGinty's vacancy. In doing so, Carles set a number of firsts for the Greens in Australia.

The seat reverted to form in the 2013 election, with Simone McGurk reclaiming the seat for Labor on Green preferences. A redistribution ahead of the 2017 election ballooned McGurk's margin from a fairly safe 57.9 percent to a comfortably safe 65.4 percent. McGurk's margin blew out in Labor's 2017 landslide, when she took 73.1 percent of the two-party vote, making Fremantle Labor's fourth-safest seat.

== Members for Fremantle ==
Member	Party	Term
William Marmion	Ministerialist	1890–1896
John Higham	Ministerialist	1896–1904
Ted Needham	Labor	1904–1905
James Price	Ministerialist	1905–1910
William Murphy	Ministerialist	1910–1911
William Carpenter	Labor	1911–1917
William Carpenter	National Labor	1917
Walter Jones	Labor	1917–1921
Frank Gibson	Nationalist	1921–1924
Joseph Sleeman	Labor	1924–1959
Harry Fletcher	Labor	1959–1977
John Troy	Labor	1977–1980
David Parker	Labor	1980–1990
Jim McGinty	Labor	1990–2009
Adele Carles	Greens	2009–2010
Adele Carles	Independent	2010–2013
Simone McGurk	Labor	2013–present

== Election results ==
2025 Western Australian state election: Fremantle
Party	Candidate	Votes	%	±%
Labor	Simone McGurk	8,418	33.6	−21.8
Independent	Kate Hulett	6,411	25.6	+25.6
Liberal	Serena Kipling	4,709	18.8	+2.5
Greens	Felicity Townsend	3,983	15.9	−4.4
Legalise Cannabis	Dave Foley	596	2.4	+2.4
Animal Justice	Natashia Boland	399	1.6	+1.6
Christians	Peter Watt	344	1.4	+1.4
Shooters, Fishers, Farmers	Nicoletta Raffaelli	217	0.9	+0.9
Total formal votes		25,077	96.6	−0.3
Informal votes		887	3.4	+0.3
Turnout		25,964	84.7	+6.2
Two-candidate-preferred result
Labor	Simone McGurk	12,734	50.8	−13.0
Independent	Kate Hulett	12,310	49.2	+49.2
Labor hold				
