= Jim McGinty =

Australian politician

The Honourable Jim McGinty AM

Leader of the Opposition
- In office 12 October 1994 – 8 October 1996
- Premier: Richard Court
- Deputy: Geoff Gallop
- Preceded by: Ian Taylor
- Succeeded by: Geoff Gallop

Attorney-General of Western Australia
- In office 16 February 2001 – 23 September 2008
- Premier: Geoff Gallop; Alan Carpenter
- Preceded by: Peter Foss
- Succeeded by: Christian Porter

Member of Parliament for Fremantle
- In office 26 May 1990 – 3 April 2009
- Preceded by: David Parker
- Succeeded by: Adele Carles

Personal details
- Born: James Andrew McGinty; 22 September 1949 (age 77) Kalgoorlie, Australia
- Party: Labor Party
- Education: BA, LLB
- Profession: Trade Union Secretary

James Andrew McGinty AM (born 22 September 1949) is an Australian former politician. He was a Labor member of the Western Australian Legislative Assembly from 1990 to 2009, representing the district of Fremantle. He was Labor Party leader and Leader of the Opposition from 1994 to 1996. He served as a minister, most notably as Attorney-General, in the governments of Carmen Lawrence, Geoff Gallop and Alan Carpenter.

== Early life ==
McGinty was born in the Western Australian town of Kalgoorlie. He studied Arts and Law at the University of Western Australia. Before entering politics, he worked as an industrial officer, then became Secretary of the Miscellaneous Workers' Union.

== Career ==
First elected to parliament at the 1990 Fremantle state by-election, McGinty became a minister in the government of Carmen Lawrence in 1991. He was made the Minister for Housing, Construction, Services and Heritage. With the exception of the Services, which he relinquished soon after taking the Environment portfolio in late 1992, McGinty held all these portfolios until Labor's defeat at the 1993 state election.

McGinty became leader of his party in 1994, succeeding Ian Taylor, only to be replaced by Geoff Gallop prior to the 1996 state election. The leadership change was due to a mutual decision between McGinty and Gallop in response to the fact that McGinty could not make a dent on the popularity of Liberal Premier Richard Court in opinion polls. Gallop had been McGinty's deputy and the two swap leadership roles with McGinty now becoming Gallop's deputy. McGinty however was replaced as deputy after the 1996 election by Eric Ripper.

After Labor returned to power at the 2001 state election, McGinty was again on the treasury bench. He became the Attorney-General, Minister for Justice and Legal Affairs, Minister for Electoral Affairs, and Minister for Peel and South West. A reshuffle in 2003 saw McGinty remain Attorney-General and Minister for Electoral Affairs, as well as becoming Minister for Health. He retained these portfolios until Labor's defeat at the 2008 state election.

McGinty had stood down as ALP leader without having a chance of presenting his case to the people of why he should be Premier at the 1996 election. As minister in the Gallop Government the prospect of him finally becoming Premier became a real possibility when Premier Gallop stood down in 2006. McGinty however did not nominate to replace Premier Gallop as factional deals had ensured Alan Carpenter becoming the next ALP leader and thus Premier.

During his time as Attorney General, Mr McGinty was recognised as a reformer. Achieving 'one vote one value' for the Legislative Assembly and Gay and Lesbian equality in the laws of Western Australia are widely seen as the hallmarks of his tenure. In addition, he established many new legal institutions, including the Corruption and Crime Commission, the State Administrative Tribunal and the Court of Appeal. As Health Minister, he was responsible for banning smoking in pubs and clubs, and for the health blueprint which has seen the creation of Fiona Stanley Hospital and the new Perth Children's Hospital as well as significant new facilities at all major metropolitan hospitals.

In recognition of his contribution to law reform and the Parliament of Western Australia, Mr McGinty was made a Member of the Order of Australia in 2013.

== Retirement ==
On 3 April 2009, McGinty announced his retirement from politics. This triggered a by-election for his district, in which Labor suffered a 16-point swing that delivered the seat to Greens candidate Adele Carles.

Political offices
Preceded by Ian Taylor	Leader of the Opposition; 1994–1996	Succeeded by Geoff Gallop
Preceded by Peter Foss	Attorney-General of Western Australia; 2001–2008	Succeeded by Christian Porter
Party political offices
Preceded by Ian Taylor	Leader of the Labor Party in Western Australia; 1994–1996	Succeeded by Geoff Gallop
Parliament of Western Australia
Preceded by David Parker	Member for Fremantle; 1990–2009	Succeeded by Adele Carles
