= Western Australian Greens =

Western Australian Greens The Greens (WA) Inc.
- Co-Convenors: Simone Collins; Giz Watson
- Parliamentary leader: Brad Pettitt
- Founded: 1990
- Headquarters: 215 Stirling St, Perth WA 6000
- Ideology: Green politics Progressivism
- Political position: Left-wing
- National affiliation: Australian Greens
- Colours: Green
- Legislative Assembly: 0 / 59
- Legislative Council: 4 / 37
- House of Representatives: 0 / 15 (WA seats)
- Senate: 1 / 12 (WA seats)

Website
- greens.org.au/wa

The Western Australian Greens, officially known as The Greens (WA) Inc., is a member party of the Australian Greens in Western Australia. The Greens (WA) was formed following the merger of the Western Australian Green Party with the Green Earth Alliance composed of the Vallentine Peace Group and Alternative Coalition in 1990. The Party became officially affiliated with the Australian Greens in 2003.

There are currently four Greens members in the state legislative council: Brad Pettitt, Tim Clifford, Jess Beckerling and Sophie McNeill. The party is also represented federally in the senate by Jordon Steele-John.

== History ==
=== Origins ===
The Greens (WA) grew out of the growing counter-cultural, environmental, anti-nuclear and peace, social and political concerns after the fall of the Whitlam government, particularly articulated by Jim Cairns in the Down to Earth movement that saw community sustainability emerging as an important issue. The Campaign to Save Native Forests and an environmental campaign against the Alcoa refinery at Wagerup first brought together many activists, some of whom were later to be involved in the Greens. The campaign in Tasmania to prevent the damming of the Franklin River, further alerted Australia to environmental issues as never before.

Anti-nuclear and peace concerns led to record numbers attending rallies in the 1980s, led by the umbrella group People for Nuclear Disarmament, (PND). One of those peace activists, Jo Vallentine, was elected in 1984 as Senator for the Nuclear Disarmament Party, (NDP). She later left the party after its infiltration by an extreme left group and registered the Vallentine Peace Group in Western Australia.

Many of these activists from the peace, anti-nuclear and disarmament movements, as well as from environment, social and political groupings were to become important organisers of future political developments. Some were inspired by the West German Greens (as they then were) as well as the many successful community campaigns in WA and throughout Australia.

After the victory in saving the Gordon and Franklin Rivers in Tasmania, activists on the east coast established "Committees of Correspondence" to keep in touch and organised a "Getting Together" Conference in Sydney. At this conference there was a call to establish an Australian Greens political party for the first time. In the mid-eighties there were many looking for an alternative to the Labor Party; were not satisfied with the Democrats and were disappointed after the collapse of the NDP.

Delegates who had gone to Sydney returned and became involved in organising a "Getting Together" conference in Western Australia, held at Hollywood High School, Easter 1987. This brought together various conservation and activist groups all proposing various models of alternative political organisation.

One example set up was the WA Ecology Party, (Eco Party). For a while there was a Green Alliance. Another example was the group established by Jan Jermalinski and others in the inner-city suburbs of Victoria Park and Carlisle called the Victoria Park/Carlisle Greens which ran Georgina Motion for Swan federal electorate under the banner of Swan Alternative Electoral Campaign (SAEC). Other local groups calling themselves "green" at the time in 1987 were the Western Suburbs Greens established by The Democrats and the Northern Suburbs Greens.

Later in 1987 and early 1988, these various "green" groups, along with The Democrats (Senator Jean Jenkins Office), various far left parties, peace and community activists pushed the establishment of an Alternative Electoral Coalition to plan a campaign for the 1989 State Election. The AEC was very much of an inner city leftist and social justice character. Later it became the Alternative Coalition. The unifying principles of the AEC were modelled on those of the German Greens; Peace; Social Justice, the Environment and Participatory Democracy.

In the south-west of the state, Louise Duxbury, who was running mate with Jo Vallentine in the 1987 federal election, a peace and environmental activist living in Denmark and Christine Sharp decided to set up a loose network called Green Development to run a candidate for the State Upper House of South West. This network drew on the support of a network of experienced activists living in the rural South-West.

However the name "greens", registered with the Australian Electoral Commission was controlled by the Sydney Greens. At this time in Western Australia it was not fully understood how important this was, although the name "greens" was being used by various groups.

Eventually some coming from the Eco Party and others got permission from the Sydney Greens to formally set up a party called The Western Australian Green Party. This party decided to run a statewide campaign in the 1989 state election.

=== Formation ===
After the 1989 election a single fact became clear, the name "green” was vital electorally. Although the Alternative Coalition campaigned heavily in South Metropolitan Upper House electorate and ran lower house candidates in Fremantle and Cockburn, throwing a lot of resources into this campaign, their percentage vote was matched by The WA Green Party campaigning in most electorates out of a campaign office in North Fremantle with few resources, just relying on the strength of the name "Green". Hence after the election negotiations began in earnest between these groups for unity. Therein lay the difficulty; the simple fact that the Western Australian Green Party controlled the electoral registration of the name Greens and the others did not.

To satisfy the demands of the Australian Electoral Commission, the Vallentine Peace Group and the Alternative Coalition formed a Green Alliance, later renamed the Green Earth Alliance. The Western Australian Green Party initially declined to join this.

During 1989, things were proceeding very slowly between The Western Australian Green Party and the Green Earth Alliance. The real breakthrough was probably the visit, initiated by Jo Vallentine of Petra Kelly from the West German Greens, who gave a great speech to a large audience at the Octagon Theatre, University of WA and the extra push was on.

A proposal was made to unite all existing groups into a new statewide party called The Greens WA. A democratic grass roots organisational model was drafted, consisting of regional groups based on Federal electorates and reporting to a Representatives Council; which model still exists today. Jo Vallentine would become the first Greens WA senator and all would unite under the West German Greens aims of Peace; Social Justice, the Environment and Participatory Democracy.

Just before the unification ceremony at the University of WA Sunken Gardens on 1 January 1990, the mailing lists of four organisations were combined which gives a reasonable measure of the support each group brought in. As of 1989 in terms of size, the Vallentine Peace Group was by far the largest network with about 4,000 on its network list and this list was heavily drawn upon by Green Development which had about 1,000, the Alternative Coalition 400, and the Western Australian Green Party about 100. However these lists included a considerable overlap of activists. However the organisations that actually signed the unification agreement were The Greens Party WA and the Green Earth Alliance composed of the Vallentine Peace Group, the Alternative Coalition and Green Development. Individual members of Green Development signed for themselves.

After The Greens WA was formally launched, it took a while to get the organisation up and running. However, by 1991 it was clear that power had actually devolved down to the Regional Groups level in a genuine grass roots organisation. The party almost immediately participated in the 1990 federal campaign and although achieving modest electoral support managed to cover most of the state booths and secure the re-election to the Senate of Jo Vallentine this time as the first The Greens WA Senator.

Jo Vallentine retired from parliamentary politics in 1992, and her place was taken by Christabel Chamarette, added to with the election of a second Greens Senator in Dee Margetts. The election of Jim Scott to the State Upper House Legislative Council at the state election in 1993 gave the party its first state representative. This representation has grown over successive years with Christine Sharp winning the South-West Legislative Council seat at the 1996 general election and after two terms being succeeded by Paul Llewelyn.

=== Joining the Australian Greens ===
The question of whether to join the newly-formed Australian Greens became a heavily disputed issue in 1992 with the proposal to join being lost. Another vote in 1999 was also lost. The Greens WA had worked closely with the Australian Greens, but they were still not formal members. Finally in September 2003, The Greens WA held a ballot of all the membership on the question of formally joining the Australian Greens confederation. There was an 80% vote in favour. On 11 October 2003 at the Australian Greens National Conference, The Greens WA were formally accepted as members of the Australian Greens.

=== Recent formation ===
With the collapse of the Australian Democrats, the Greens vote has continued to grow. At the 2009 Fremantle state by-election, Greens candidate Adele Carles received 45 percent of the primary vote to Labor's 38 percent, and 54 percent of the two-candidate vote to Labor's 46 percent, becoming the first Greens candidate to be elected to an Australian state lower house of parliament in a single-member seat. A later scandal involving former Liberal leader and Treasurer Troy Buswell saw Carles leave the Greens to sit as an independent. Carles lost her seat at the 2013 state election.

On 2 June 2025, Senator Dorinda Cox left the Greens and joined the Australian Labor Party.

== Governance structure ==
The Greens Western Australia (Greens WA) operate under a decentralised and participatory governance model that reflects the party's core commitment to grassroots democracy. The party's organisational structure is based on consensus decision-making and member participation at all levels.

At the foundation of the party are local groups, which are composed of members in specific geographic areas. These groups are autonomous in their operations and play a key role in policy development, preselection, and campaign activities. Local groups send delegates to the State Council, the party's peak decision-making body.

The State Council is responsible for setting policy direction, managing party affairs, and coordinating with the Australian Greens. It is composed of representatives from local groups, elected officeholders, and members of standing committees. Decisions in the State Council are made by consensus where possible, or by a supermajority if consensus cannot be reached.

The party also maintains several working groups and standing committees focused on specific issues such as policy development, electoral strategy, and internal governance. These committees are open to members and report to the State Council.

Office bearers, including the party co-convenors, secretary, and treasurer, are elected by the membership at the Annual General Meeting (AGM). The co-convenor model reflects the Greens’ commitment to gender equity, with one male and one female (or non-binary) co-convenor wherever possible.

The Greens WA's governance structure emphasizes transparency, inclusivity, and collective decision-making, distinguishing it from traditional hierarchical party models.

== Leaders ==
#	Leader	Electorate	Term start	Term end	Time in office	Elections contested	Premier (term)
1	Brad Pettitt	Western Australian Legislative Council	March 2025 (Note: Pettitt was elected as party leader sometime after the 2025 state election, the exact date is not public)	Incumbent	1 year, 257 days	–	Cook 2023–present

== Policies ==
The Greens (WA) base their policies on four core principles: ecological sustainability, social justice, grassroots democracy, and peace and non-violence. They support a rapid transition to a net-zero carbon economy by 2035, including the phase-out of coal-fired power generation in Collie before 2030, and oppose new or expanded fossil fuel projects.

The party's "Forests For Life" plan includes growing 40,000 hectares of high-value hardwood plantations to promote sustainable timber, job creation, and ecosystem restoration.

The Greens WA also advocate for protecting urban bushland and expanding tree canopy cover, calling for legislative protection of all Bush Forever sites and a State-wide Urban Bushland Strategy.

Their anti-nuclear policy includes banning uranium mining, nuclear reactors, and nuclear waste disposal facilities in WA.

On housing, the party supports recognizing housing as a human right, increasing public housing, and ensuring culturally appropriate housing for First Nations communities.

== Electoral performance ==
Since its formation in 1990, the Greens Western Australia have contested state and federal elections, steadily building parliamentary representation. The party has typically secured between 8% and 15% of the statewide vote in Legislative Council elections and has often held the balance of power in the upper house.

In the 2021 Western Australian state election, the party retained one seat in the Legislative Council. In the 2025 state election, Greens WA increased their representation to four seats, re-electing Tim Clifford and adding Sophie McNeill and Jess Beckering.

== Election results ==
Election	Legislative Assembly			Legislative Council			Status
Election	Seats won	Total votes	%	Seats won	Total votes	%	Status
1989	0 / 57	4,246	0.53%	0 / 34	27,013	3.19%	Extra-parliamentary
1993	0 / 57	39,300	4.31%	1 / 34	47,305	5.16%	Crossbench
1996	0 / 57	45,550	4.73%	3 / 34	54,336	5.55%	Crossbench
2001	0 / 57	74,641	7.27%	5 / 34	83,883	8.00%	Crossbench
2005	0 / 57	81,113	7.57%	2 / 34	82,507	7.52%	Crossbench
2008	0 / 59	129,827	11.92%	4 / 36	123,942	11.08%	Crossbench
2013	0 / 59	99,431	8.39%	2 / 36	100,624	8.21%	Crossbench
2017	0 / 59	117,723	8.91%	4 / 36	116,041	8.60%	Crossbench
2021	0 / 59	97,713	6.92%	1 / 36	91,849	6.38%	Crossbench
2025	0 / 59	169,007	11.06%	4 / 37	170,052	10.94%	Crossbench

== Members of Parliament ==
=== Federal Parliament ===
Senator Jordon Steele-John (2017–present)

==== Former ====
- Senator Jo Vallentine (1990–1992)
- Senator Christabel Chamarette (1992–1996)
- Senator Dee Margetts (1993–1999)
- Senator Rachel Siewert (2005–2021)
- Senator Scott Ludlam (2008–2017)
- Senator Dorinda Cox (2021–2025)

=== State Parliament ===
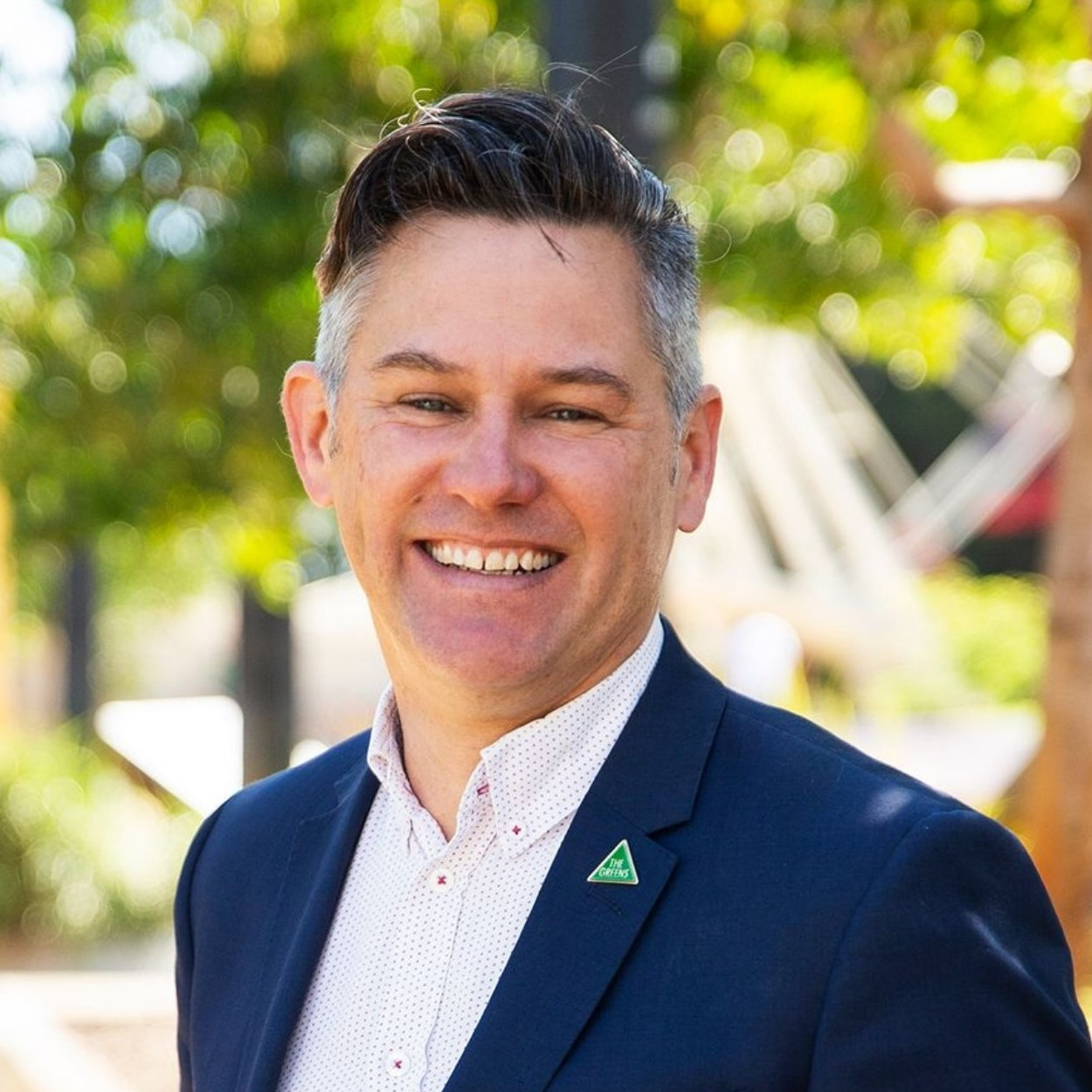
Brad Pettitt MLC (2017–present)

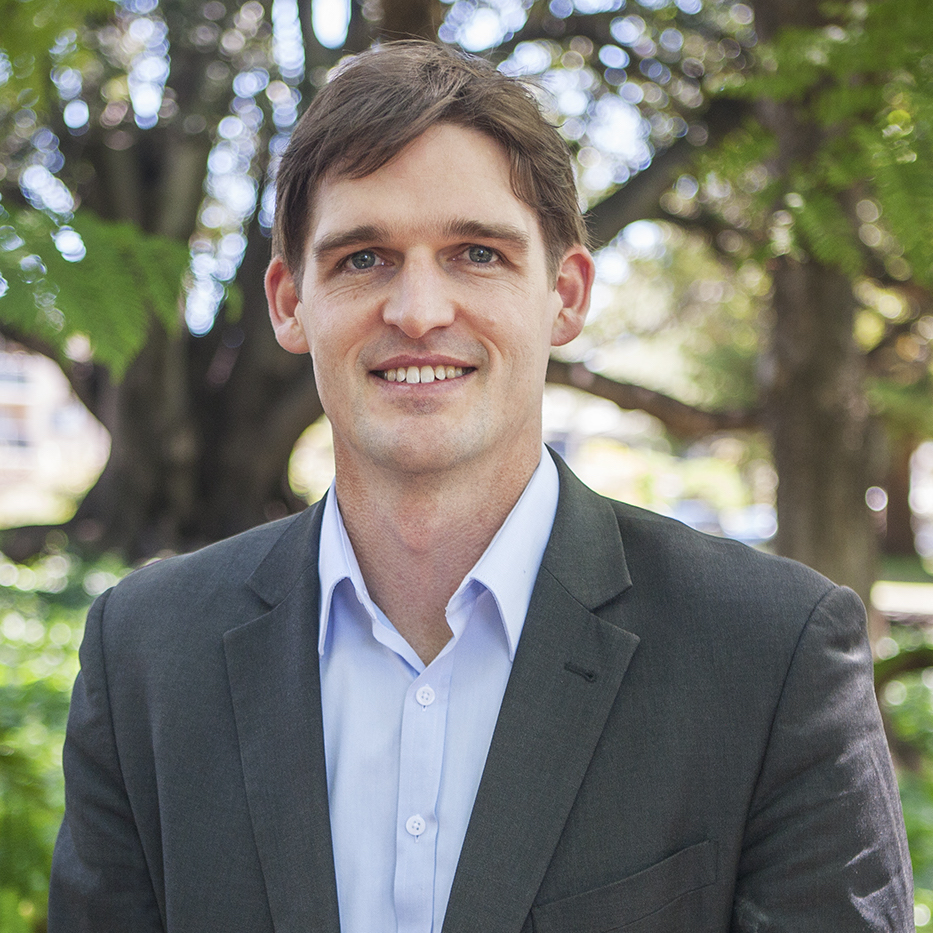
Tim Clifford MLC (2017–2021; 2025–present)

Jess Beckerling MLC (2025–present)

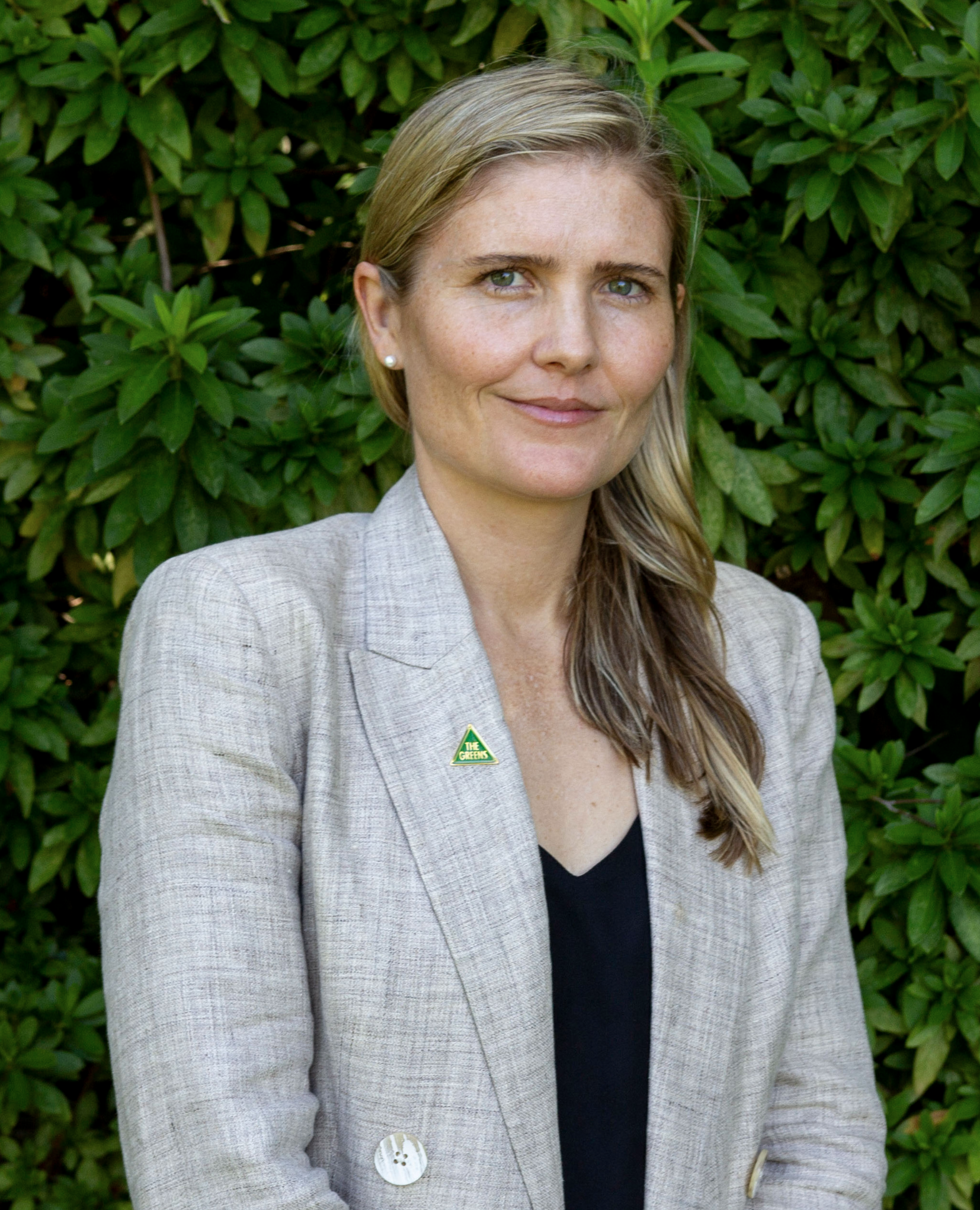
Sophie McNeill MLC (2025–present)

==== Former ====
- Jim Scott MLC (1993–2005)
- Chrissy Sharp MLC (1997–2005)
- Giz Watson MLC (1997–2013)
- Dee Margetts MLC (2001–2005)
- Paul Llewellyn MLC (2005–2009)
- Lynn MacLaren MLC (2005, 2009–2017)
- Adele Carles, MLA for Fremantle (2009–2010)
- Robin Chapple MLC (2001–2005, 2009–2021)
- Alison Xamon MLC (2009–2013, 2017–2021)
- Diane Evers MLC (2017–2021)

== Historical logos ==
Logo used at the party's foundation.

Former logo of the party.
