= Results of the 1989 Western Australian state election (Legislative Assembly) =

Western Australian state election, 4 February 1989 Legislative Assembly << 1986–1993 >>
Enrolled voters	957,939				
Votes cast	869,100		Turnout	90.73%	–0.71%
Informal votes	63,870		Informal	7.35%	+4.72%
Summary of votes by party
Party	Primary votes	%	Swing	Seats	Change
Labor	341,931	42.46%	–10.54%	31	– 1
Liberal	344,524	42.79%	+1.47%	20	+ 1
National	37,075	4.60%	+0.89%	6	± 0
Grey Power	41,525	5.16%	+5.16%	0	± 0
Democrats	11,509	1.43%	+0.77%	0	± 0
Greens	4,246	0.53%	+0.53%	0	± 0
Other parties	1,042	0.13%	–0.20%	0	± 0
Independent	23,378	2.90%	+1.92%	0	± 0
Total	805,230			57	
Two-party-preferred
Labor	383,422	47.62%	–6.50%		
Liberal	421,808	52.38%	+6.50%		

This is a list of electoral district results of the 1989 Western Australian election.

== Results by electoral district ==
=== Albany ===
1989 Western Australian state election: Albany
Party	Candidate	Votes	%	±%
Liberal	Leo Watt	4,566	47.6	−5.7
Labor	Brian Bradley	3,540	36.9	−9.8
National	Michael Jardine	1,487	15.5	+15.5
Total formal votes		9,593	93.6	
Informal votes		657	6.4	
Turnout		10,250	92.8	
Two-party-preferred result
Liberal	Leo Watt	5,769	60.1	+6.8
Labor	Brian Bradley	3,824	39.9	−6.8
Liberal hold		Swing	+6.8	

=== Applecross ===
1989 Western Australian state election: Applecross
Party	Candidate	Votes	%	±%
Liberal	Richard Lewis	11,424	63.1	+2.8
Labor	Margaret Barton	5,126	28.3	−11.2
Grey Power	Anthony Furness	1,544	8.5	+8.5
Total formal votes		18,094	94.4	
Informal votes		1,076	5.6	
Turnout		19,170	92.3	
Two-party-preferred result
Liberal	Richard Lewis	12,497	69.1	+8.7
Labor	Margaret Barton	5,597	30.9	−8.7
Liberal hold		Swing	+8.7	

=== Armadale ===
1989 Western Australian state election: Armadale
Party	Candidate	Votes	%	±%
Labor	Bob Pearce	7,749	47.7	−14.6
Liberal	Maureen Healy	6,207	38.2	+1.1
Grey Power	William Higgins	1,269	7.8	+7.8
Independent	Reginald Hames	1,026	6.3	+6.3
Total formal votes		16,251	90.6	
Informal votes		1,692	9.4	
Turnout		17,943	91.9	
Two-party-preferred result
Labor	Bob Pearce	8,629	53.1	−9.5
Liberal	Maureen Healy	7,622	46.9	+9.5
Labor hold		Swing	−9.5	

=== Ashburton ===
1989 Western Australian state election: Ashburton
Party	Candidate	Votes	%	±%
Labor	Pam Buchanan	3,639	53.5	−12.4
Liberal	Maurice Harper	2,592	38.1	+4.0
Independent	David Fort	575	8.5	+8.5
Total formal votes		6,806	93.0	
Informal votes		509	7.0	
Turnout		7,315	80.4	
Two-party-preferred result
Labor	Pam Buchanan	3,941	57.9	−8.0
Liberal	Maurice Harper	2,865	42.1	+8.0
Labor hold		Swing	−8.0	

=== Avon ===
1989 Western Australian state election: Avon
Party	Candidate	Votes	%	±%
National	Max Trenorden	4,132	39.5	+10.9
Labor	Robert Duncanson	3,315	31.7	−11.8
Liberal	John Dival	3,007	28.8	+1.0
Total formal votes		10,454	93.1	
Informal votes		769	6.9	
Turnout		11,223	91.7	
Two-party-preferred result
National	Max Trenorden	6,900	66.0	+11.4
Labor	Robert Duncanson	3,554	34.0	−11.4
National hold		Swing	+11.4	

=== Balcatta ===
1989 Western Australian state election: Balcatta
Party	Candidate	Votes	%	±%
Labor	Nick Catania	8,806	51.4	−12.4
Liberal	Marie Wordsworth	7,065	41.2	+5.0
Grey Power	Brendan O'Dwyer	1,267	7.4	+7.4
Total formal votes		17,138	89.1	
Informal votes		2,088	10.9	
Turnout		19,226	91.7	
Two-party-preferred result
Labor	Nick Catania	9,248	54.0	−9.8
Liberal	Marie Wordsworth	7,890	46.0	+9.8
Labor hold		Swing	−9.8	

=== Belmont ===
1989 Western Australian state election: Belmont
Party	Candidate	Votes	%	±%
Labor	Eric Ripper	9,072	53.0	−14.5
Liberal	Brett Whitford	5,455	31.9	−0.6
Grey Power	Margaret Bright	1,527	8.9	+8.9
Democrats	Barbara Turner	699	4.1	+4.1
Independent	Clem Cumbo	367	2.1	+2.1
Total formal votes		17,120	87.9	
Informal votes		2,350	12.1	
Turnout		19,470	91.6	
Two-party-preferred result
Labor	Eric Ripper	10,358	60.5	−7.0
Liberal	Brett Whitford	6,762	39.5	+7.0
Labor hold		Swing	−7.0	

=== Bunbury ===
1989 Western Australian state election: Bunbury
Party	Candidate	Votes	%	±%
Labor	Phil Smith	4,402	47.7	−6.9
Liberal	Raymond Bosustow	3,969	43.0	−0.9
Grey Power	Margaret Charnley	402	4.4	+4.4
Independent	Judyth Salom	349	3.8	+3.8
Citizens Electoral Council	David Morrissey	113	1.2	+1.2
Total formal votes		9,235	94.3	
Informal votes		554	5.7	
Turnout		9,789	91.5	
Two-party-preferred result
Labor	Phil Smith	4,759	51.5	−3.9
Liberal	Raymond Bosustow	4,476	48.5	+3.9
Labor hold		Swing	−3.9	

=== Cockburn ===
1989 Western Australian state election: Cockburn
Party	Candidate	Votes	%	±%
Labor	Bill Thomas	9,206	58.4	−17.1
Liberal	Simon O'Brien	4,753	30.1	+7.0
Grey Power	Isobel Davison	1,056	6.7	+6.7
Alternative Coalition	Alison Jensen	750	4.8	+4.8
Total formal votes		15,765	87.1	
Informal votes		2,331	12.9	
Turnout		18,096	92.5	
Two-party-preferred result
Labor	Bill Thomas	10,183	64.6	−11.8
Liberal	Simon O'Brien	5,582	35.4	+11.8
Labor hold		Swing	−11.8	

=== Collie ===
1989 Western Australian state election: Collie
Party	Candidate	Votes	%	±%
Labor	John Mumme	4,091	43.4	−8.1
National	Hilda Turnbull	2,914	30.9	+4.1
Liberal	John Silcock	1,984	21.0	+0.5
Democrats	Ursula Bolitho	311	3.3	+3.3
Independent	Alfred Bussell	129	1.4	+1.4
Total formal votes		9,429	94.1	
Informal votes		592	5.9	
Turnout		10,021	92.9	
Two-party-preferred result
National	Hilda Turnbull	4,984	52.9	+6.5
Labor	John Mumme	4,445	47.1	−6.5
National gain from Labor		Swing	+6.5	

=== Cottesloe ===
1989 Western Australian state election: Cottesloe
Party	Candidate	Votes	%	±%
Liberal	Bill Hassell	10,824	59.4	+1.6
Labor	John Noonan	4,811	26.4	−15.8
Democrats	Martina Hagues	1,318	7.2	+7.2
Grey Power	Marianne McCall	1,255	6.9	+6.9
Total formal votes		18,208	94.9	
Informal votes		980	5.1	
Turnout		19,188	88.8	
Two-party-preferred result
Liberal	Bill Hassell	12,169	66.8	+9.0
Labor	John Noonan	6,039	33.2	−9.0
Liberal hold		Swing	+9.0	

=== Darling Range ===
1989 Western Australian state election: Darling Range
Party	Candidate	Votes	%	±%
Liberal	Ian Thompson	10,373	61.1	+2.5
Labor	Maura Howlett	4,999	29.5	−11.9
Grey Power	Eric Tommey	1,594	9.4	+9.4
Total formal votes		16,966	94.3	
Informal votes		1,026	5.7	
Turnout		17,992	91.5	
Two-party-preferred result
Liberal	Ian Thompson	11,492	67.7	+9.1
Labor	Maura Howlett	5,474	32.3	−9.1
Liberal hold		Swing	+9.1	

=== Dianella ===
1989 Western Australian state election: Dianella
Party	Candidate	Votes	%	±%
Labor	Keith Wilson	8,521	46.0	−8.3
Liberal	Terence Tyzack	8,177	44.1	−1.6
Grey Power	John Greathead	927	5.0	+5.0
Independent	Allan Jones	914	4.9	+4.9
Total formal votes		18,539	91.8	
Informal votes		1,650	8.2	
Turnout		20,189	91.8	
Two-party-preferred result
Labor	Keith Wilson	9,478	51.1	−3.2
Liberal	Terence Tyzack	9,061	48.9	+3.2
Labor hold		Swing	−3.2	

=== Eyre ===
1989 Western Australian state election: Eyre
Party	Candidate	Votes	%	±%
Labor	Julian Grill	4,843	57.7	−13.7
Liberal	Stephen Sprigg	2,673	31.8	+9.1
Independent	Yvonne Hicks	461	5.5	+5.5
Independent	Donald Green	418	5.0	+5.0
Total formal votes		8,395	92.2	
Informal votes		706	7.8	
Turnout		9,101	80.6	
Two-party-preferred result
Labor	Julian Grill	5,138	61.2	−13.0
Liberal	Stephen Sprigg	3,257	38.8	+13.0
Labor hold		Swing	−13.0	

=== Floreat ===
1989 Western Australian state election: Floreat
Party	Candidate	Votes	%	±%
Liberal	Andrew Mensaros	11,840	63.3	−1.6
Labor	Clyde Bevan	4,242	22.7	−12.0
Grey Power	Jane King	1,520	8.1	+8.1
Democrats	Georgina Beaumont	1,110	5.9	+5.9
Total formal votes		18,712	96.0	
Informal votes		783	4.0	
Turnout		19,495	91.6	
Two-party-preferred result
Liberal	Andrew Mensaros	13,150	70.3	+5.2
Labor	Clyde Bevan	5,562	29.7	−5.2
Liberal hold		Swing	+5.2	

=== Fremantle ===
1989 Western Australian state election: Fremantle
Party	Candidate	Votes	%	±%
Labor	David Parker	7,556	42.6	−26.8
Liberal	Peter Cumins	5,367	30.3	−0.3
Independent	John Troy	2,276	12.8	+12.8
Democrats	Mary Druskovich	906	5.1	+5.1
Alternative Coalition	Dee Margetts	869	4.9	+4.9
Grey Power	Jack Webb	745	4.2	+4.2
Total formal votes		17,719	89.6	
Informal votes		2,063	10.4	
Turnout		19,782	89.8	
Two-party-preferred result
Labor	David Parker	11,058	62.4	−7.0
Liberal	Peter Cumins	6,661	37.6	+7.0
Labor hold		Swing	−7.0	

=== Geraldton ===
1989 Western Australian state election: Geraldton
Party	Candidate	Votes	%	±%
Labor	Jeff Carr	4,767	47.6	−2.8
Liberal	Victor McCabe	4,361	43.5	−6.1
Grey Power	Mary Gould	889	8.9	+8.9
Total formal votes		10,017	94.0	
Informal votes		644	6.0	
Turnout		10,661	90.8	
Two-party-preferred result
Labor	Jeff Carr	5,032	50.2	−0.2
Liberal	Victor McCabe	4,985	49.8	+0.2
Labor hold		Swing	−0.2	

=== Glendalough ===
1989 Western Australian state election: Glendalough
Party	Candidate	Votes	%	±%
Labor	Carmen Lawrence	8,852	49.6	−10.3
Liberal	Gloria Hancock	7,109	39.9	+1.8
Grey Power	Donald Gudgeon	1,006	5.6	+5.6
Independent	Clive Galletly	866	4.9	+4.9
Total formal votes		17,833	90.1	
Informal votes		1,952	9.9	
Turnout		19,785	88.7	
Two-party-preferred result
Labor	Carmen Lawrence	9,773	54.8	−6.1
Liberal	Gloria Hancock	8,060	45.2	+6.1
Labor hold		Swing	−6.1	

=== Greenough ===
1989 Western Australian state election: Greenough
Party	Candidate	Votes	%	±%
Liberal	Kevin Minson	5,416	53.4	−19.4
Labor	Frank O'Loughlin	2,599	26.1	+0.4
National	John Hutchinson	1,948	19.5	+18.0
Total formal votes		9,963	94.5	
Informal votes		580	5.5	
Turnout		10,543	91.6	
Two-party-preferred result
Liberal	Kevin Minson	7,102	71.3	−2.6
Labor	Frank O'Loughlin	2,861	28.7	+2.6
Liberal hold		Swing	−2.6	

=== Helena ===
1989 Western Australian state election: Helena
Party	Candidate	Votes	%	±%
Labor	Gordon Hill	8,738	49.1	−13.2
Liberal	Bob Greig	7,302	41.0	+3.3
Grey Power	Cecil Morris	1,393	7.8	+7.8
	Jack van Tongeren	375	2.1	+2.1
Total formal votes		17,808	91.6	
Informal votes		1,634	8.4	
Turnout		19,442	92.2	
Two-party-preferred result
Labor	Gordon Hill	9,358	52.6	−9.7
Liberal	Bob Greig	8,450	47.4	+9.7
Labor hold		Swing	−9.7	

=== Jandakot ===
1989 Western Australian state election: Jandakot
Party	Candidate	Votes	%	±%
Liberal	Barry MacKinnon	10,504	59.5	+2.3
Labor	William Lyon	5,672	32.2	−9.6
Grey Power	Bryan Cortese	1,093	6.2	+6.2
	Timothy Thies	370	2.1	+2.1
Total formal votes		17,639	94.2	
Informal votes		1,083	5.8	
Turnout		18,722	93.2	
Two-party-preferred result
Liberal	Barry MacKinnon	11,387	64.6	+7.4
Labor	William Lyon	6,252	35.4	−7.4
Liberal hold		Swing	+7.4	

=== Kalgoorlie ===
1989 Western Australian state election: Kalgoorlie
Party	Candidate	Votes	%	±%
Labor	Ian Taylor	5,224	59.2	−18.1
Liberal	Douglas Bowie	2,918	33.1	+10.4
Independent	John Burt	378	4.3	+4.3
Independent	Peter Girando	298	3.4	+3.4
Total formal votes		8,818	93.9	
Informal votes		569	6.1	
Turnout		9,387	89.3	
Two-party-preferred result
Labor	Ian Taylor	5,414	61.4	−15.9
Liberal	Douglas Bowie	3,404	38.6	+15.9
Labor hold		Swing	−15.9	

=== Kenwick ===
1989 Western Australian state election: Kenwick
Party	Candidate	Votes	%	±%
Labor	Judyth Watson	8,286	49.5	−16.3
Liberal	Joao Malta	5,739	34.3	+0.1
Grey Power	William Meadwell	1,412	8.4	+8.4
Democrats	Donald Bryant	895	5.4	+5.4
Independent	Jean Jeans	410	2.5	+2.5
Total formal votes		16,742	88.9	
Informal votes		2,087	11.1	
Turnout		18,829	91.1	
Two-party-preferred result
Labor	Judyth Watson	9,533	56.9	−8.9
Liberal	Joao Malta	7,209	43.1	+8.9
Labor hold		Swing	−8.9	

=== Kimberley ===
1989 Western Australian state election: Kimberley
Party	Candidate	Votes	%	±%
Labor	Ernie Bridge	5,342	69.6	+2.1
Liberal	Maxine Reid	2,337	30.4	−2.1
Total formal votes		7,679	98.2	
Informal votes		140	1.8	
Turnout		7,819	72.6	
Labor hold		Swing	+2.1	

=== Kingsley ===
1989 Western Australian state election: Kingsley
Party	Candidate	Votes	%	±%
Liberal	Cheryl Edwardes	8,981	52.0	+9.3
Labor	Mark Nolan	6,706	38.9	−14.4
Grey Power	Francis Butler	925	5.4	+5.4
Independent	Robert Gow	329	1.9	+1.9
Independent	Jack Christensen	322	1.9	+1.9
Total formal votes		17,263	93.8	
Informal votes		1,132	6.2	
Turnout		18,395	93.4	
Two-party-preferred result
Liberal	Cheryl Edwardes	9,944	57.6	+12.9
Labor	Mark Nolan	7,319	42.4	−12.9
Liberal gain from Labor		Swing	+12.9	

=== Mandurah ===
1989 Western Australian state election: Mandurah
Party	Candidate	Votes	%	±%
Labor	John Read	4,012	46.1	−9.7
Liberal	Roger Nicholls	3,974	45.7	+7.0
Grey Power	Barbara Stark	711	8.2	+8.2
Total formal votes		8,697	93.6	
Informal votes		590	6.4	
Turnout		9,287	92.3	
Two-party-preferred result
Liberal	Roger Nicholls	4,441	51.1	+9.7
Labor	John Read	4,256	48.9	−9.7
Liberal gain from Labor		Swing	+9.7	

=== Marangaroo ===
1989 Western Australian state election: Marangaroo
Party	Candidate	Votes	%	±%
Labor	Ted Cunningham	9,418	59.2	−16.3
Liberal	William Lewis	5,188	32.6	+12.2
Grey Power	James Wilson	1,313	8.2	+8.2
Total formal votes		15,919	88.9	
Informal votes		1,992	11.1	
Turnout		17,911	91.8	
Two-party-preferred result
Labor	Ted Cunningham	9,937	62.4	−15.2
Liberal	William Lewis	5,982	37.6	+15.2
Labor hold		Swing	−15.2	

=== Marmion ===
1989 Western Australian state election: Marmion
Party	Candidate	Votes	%	±%
Liberal	Jim Clarko	11,324	56.7	+7.8
Labor	Jonathan Davies	6,016	30.1	−18.0
Grey Power	Eric Hammond	1,426	7.1	+7.1
Greens	Sharon McDonald	1,194	6.0	+6.0
Total formal votes		19,960	94.4	
Informal votes		1,183	5.6	
Turnout		21,143	92.3	
Two-party-preferred result
Liberal	Jim Clarko	12,837	64.3	+13.9
Labor	Jonathan Davies	7,123	35.7	−13.9
Liberal hold		Swing	+13.9	

=== Maylands ===
1989 Western Australian state election: Maylands
Party	Candidate	Votes	%	±%
Labor	Peter Dowding	10,575	56.1	−6.2
Liberal	Peter Blaxell	6,255	33.2	+1.2
Grey Power	John Redmond	825	4.4	+4.4
Independent	Norman Heslington	593	3.2	+3.2
Family Movement	Brian Peachey	404	2.1	+2.1
Independent	Noel Sharp	195	1.0	+1.0
Total formal votes		18,847	90.8	
Informal votes		1,901	9.2	
Turnout		20,748	90.6	
Two-party-preferred result
Labor	Peter Dowding	11,335	60.1	−5.1
Liberal	Peter Blaxell	7,512	39.9	+5.1
Labor hold		Swing	−5.1	

=== Melville ===
1989 Western Australian state election: Melville
Party	Candidate	Votes	%	±%
Liberal	Doug Shave	8,159	44.3	+4.5
Labor	Barry Hodge	8,159	44.3	−15.9
Greens	Paul Llewellyn	858	4.7	+4.7
Grey Power	Leslie Sells	732	4.0	+4.0
Independent	Bernard Putnin	508	2.8	+2.8
Total formal votes		18,416	92.0	
Informal votes		1,605	8.0	
Turnout		20,021	92.5	
Two-party-preferred result
Liberal	Doug Shave	9,224	50.1	+10.3
Labor	Barry Hodge	9,192	49.9	−10.3
Liberal gain from Labor		Swing	+10.3	

=== Merredin ===
1989 Western Australian state election: Merredin
Party	Candidate	Votes	%	±%
National	Hendy Cowan	8,154	78.0	+20.5
Labor	Michael Fitzpatrick	1,887	18.0	+0.6
Independent	Margaret Buegge	420	4.0	+4.0
Total formal votes		10,461	95.6	
Informal votes		486	4.4	
Turnout		10,947	92.8	
Two-party-preferred result
National	Hendy Cowan	8,495	81.2	+8.9
Labor	Michael Fitzpatrick	1,966	18.8	+18.8
National hold		Swing	N/A	

=== Mitchell ===
1989 Western Australian state election: Mitchell
Party	Candidate	Votes	%	±%
Labor	David Smith	5,394	57.4	−5.5
Liberal	Beverley Bradshaw	4,002	42.6	+5.5
Total formal votes		9,396	97.9	
Informal votes		204	2.1	
Turnout		9,600	92.1	
Labor hold		Swing	−5.5	

=== Moore ===
1989 Western Australian state election: Moore
Party	Candidate	Votes	%	±%
Liberal	Bill McNee	5,123	48.8	−4.3
National	Mort Schell	3,148	30.0	+0.3
Labor	John Mason	1,854	17.7	+0.5
Independent	Edna Smith	369	3.5	+3.5
Total formal votes		10,494	95.6	
Informal votes		487	4.4	
Turnout		10,981	92.2	
Two-candidate-preferred result
Liberal	Bill McNee	5,506	52.5	−3.2
National	Mort Schell	4,988	47.5	+3.2
Liberal hold		Swing	−3.2	

=== Morley ===
1989 Western Australian state election: Morley
Party	Candidate	Votes	%	±%
Labor	Frank Donovan	10,808	62.4	−5.2
Liberal	David MacGregor	6,522	37.6	+5.2
Total formal votes		17,330	96.5	
Informal votes		630	3.5	
Turnout		17,960	92.4	
Labor hold		Swing	−5.2	

=== Murray ===
1989 Western Australian state election: Murray
Party	Candidate	Votes	%	±%
Liberal	Brian McLean	4,086	45.2	−1.3
Labor	Keith Read	3,991	44.2	−7.2
Independent	Luna Gardiner	488	5.4	+5.4
Independent	Terence Caraher	287	3.2	+3.2
Independent	Susan Ishmael	183	2.0	+2.0
Total formal votes		9,035	92.5	
Informal votes		727	7.5	
Turnout		9,762	92.1	
Two-party-preferred result
Labor	Keith Read	4,598	50.9	−1.5
Liberal	Brian McLean	4,437	49.1	+1.5
Labor hold		Swing	−1.5	

=== Nedlands ===
1989 Western Australian state election: Nedlands
Party	Candidate	Votes	%	±%
Liberal	Richard Court	10,824	59.5	−3.2
Labor	Ross Connell	4,539	25.0	−12.0
Democrats	Kevin Judd	1,616	8.9	+8.9
Grey Power	Douglas Ratcliffe	1,198	6.6	+6.6
Total formal votes		18,177	95.3	
Informal votes		905	4.7	
Turnout		19,082	87.2	
Two-party-preferred result
Liberal	Richard Court	12,243	67.3	+4.5
Labor	Ross Connell	5,934	32.7	−4.5
Liberal hold		Swing	+4.5	

=== Nollamara ===
1989 Western Australian state election: Nollamara
Party	Candidate	Votes	%	±%
Labor	John Kobelke	7,930	50.1	−17.4
Liberal	William Stewart	6,994	44.2	+12.9
Democrats	Brian Lobascher	913	5.8	+5.8
Total formal votes		15,837	88.8	
Informal votes		2,003	11.2	
Turnout		17,840	91.8	
Two-party-preferred result
Labor	John Kobelke	8,497	53.7	−14.4
Liberal	William Stewart	7,340	46.3	+14.4
Labor hold		Swing	−14.4	

=== Northern Rivers ===
1989 Western Australian state election: Northern Rivers
Party	Candidate	Votes	%	±%
Labor	Kevin Leahy	4,392	50.6	−3.0
Liberal	Dudley Maslen	4,284	49.4	+4.5
Total formal votes		8,676	97.8	
Informal votes		193	2.2	
Turnout		8,869	83.2	
Labor hold		Swing	−3.8	

=== Peel ===
1989 Western Australian state election: Peel
Party	Candidate	Votes	%	±%
Labor	Norm Marlborough	8,466	52.6	−17.4
Liberal	Marten Noordzy	4,782	29.7	+0.7
Grey Power	Desmond Swiney	1,428	8.9	+8.9
Independent	Michael Nella	1,411	8.8	+8.8
Total formal votes		16,087	89.8	
Informal votes		1,822	10.2	
Turnout		17,909	91.3	
Two-party-preferred result
Labor	Norm Marlborough	9,557	59.4	−11.1
Liberal	Marten Noordzy	6,530	40.6	+11.1
Labor hold		Swing	−11.1	

=== Perth ===
1989 Western Australian state election: Perth
Party	Candidate	Votes	%	±%
Labor	Ian Alexander	8,305	45.9	+12.8
Liberal	Kim Hames	7,806	43.1	+3.9
Democrats	Frederick Long	1,023	5.7	+5.7
Grey Power	Gerrard Taylor	974	5.4	+5.4
Total formal votes		18,108	91.6	
Informal votes		1,654	8.4	
Turnout		19,762	88.5	
Two-party-preferred result
Labor	Ian Alexander	9,263	51.2	−8.5
Liberal	Kim Hames	8,845	48.8	+8.5
Labor hold		Swing	−8.5	

=== Pilbara ===
1989 Western Australian state election: Pilbara
Party	Candidate	Votes	%	±%
Labor	Larry Graham	4,466	56.5	−9.9
Liberal	William Shephard	2,437	30.8	−2.8
Independent	Vincent Cooper	1,003	12.7	+12.7
Total formal votes		7,906	90.9	
Informal votes		792	9.1	
Turnout		8,698	78.4	
Two-party-preferred result
Labor	Larry Graham	4,858	61.5	−4.9
Liberal	William Shepherd	3,048	38.5	+4.9
Labor hold		Swing	−4.9	

=== Riverton ===
1989 Western Australian state election: Riverton
Party	Candidate	Votes	%	±%
Liberal	Graham Kierath	8,452	48.5	+1.3
Labor	Marilyn Crispin	6,702	38.5	−12.3
Independent	Eelco Tacoma	1,007	5.8	+5.8
Democrats	Neil Worrall	768	4.4	+4.4
Independent	Michael Smith	493	2.8	+2.8
Total formal votes		17,422	93.1	
Informal votes		1,293	6.9	
Turnout		18,715	92.2	
Two-party-preferred result
Liberal	Graham Kierath	9,496	54.5	+6.3
Labor	Marilyn Crispin	7,926	45.5	−6.3
Liberal gain from Labor		Swing	+6.3	

=== Rockingham ===
1989 Western Australian state election: Rockingham
Party	Candidate	Votes	%	±%
Labor	Mike Barnett	8,333	50.2	−12.5
Liberal	Robert Douglas	6,137	37.0	+2.9
Grey Power	Elsie Pledge	2,135	12.8	+12.8
Total formal votes		16,615	91.5	
Informal votes		1,533	8.5	
Turnout		18,148	92.5	
Two-party-preferred result
Labor	Mike Barnett	8,986	54.1	−10.2
Liberal	Robert Douglas	7,629	45.9	+10.2
Labor hold		Swing	−10.2	

=== Roe ===
1989 Western Australian state election: Roe
Party	Candidate	Votes	%	±%
Liberal	Graham Jacobs	4,412	42.3	−0.6
National	Ross Ainsworth	3,548	34.0	+7.4
Labor	Peter Blond	1,953	18.7	−11.7
Citizens Electoral Council	Dallas Clarnette	525	5.0	+5.0
Total formal votes		10,438	95.5	
Informal votes		491	4.5	
Turnout		10,929	91.6	
Two-candidate-preferred result
National	Ross Ainsworth	5,320	51.0	+51.0
Liberal	Graham Jacobs	5,118	49.0	−13.9
National gain from Liberal		Swing	N/A	

=== Roleystone ===
1989 Western Australian state election: Roleystone
Party	Candidate	Votes	%	±%
Liberal	Fred Tubby	7,557	44.1	+1.9
Labor	Roger Stubbs	7,268	42.4	−13.1
Grey Power	Frederick Betts	1,419	8.3	+8.3
Independent	Edna Stevens	448	2.6	+2.6
Independent	Maralyn Yorston	446	2.6	+2.6
Total formal votes		17,138	92.2	
Informal votes		1,444	7.8	
Turnout		18,582	92.1	
Two-party-preferred result
Liberal	Fred Tubby	8,863	51.7	+8.4
Labor	Roger Stubbs	8,275	48.3	−8.4
Liberal gain from Labor		Swing	+8.4	

=== Scarborough ===
1989 Western Australian state election: Scarborough
Party	Candidate	Votes	%	±%
Liberal	George Strickland	8,437	44.6	+4.6
Labor	Graham Burkett	7,917	41.9	−11.3
Grey Power	Eugene Hands	1,034	5.5	+5.5
Democrats	Gaenor Cranch	915	4.8	+1.6
Independent	Peter Rose	604	3.2	+3.2
Total formal votes		18,907	94.5	
Informal votes		1,098	5.5	
Turnout		20,005	90.3	
Two-party-preferred result
Liberal	George Strickland	9,758	51.6	+8.2
Labor	Graham Burkett	9,149	48.4	−8.2
Liberal gain from Labor		Swing	+8.2	

=== South Perth ===
1989 Western Australian state election: South Perth
Party	Candidate	Votes	%	±%
Liberal	Bill Grayden	8,980	50.7	−4.6
Labor	Joan Davison	5,994	33.9	−10.8
Independent	David Smith	1,567	8.9	+8.9
Grey Power	Beatrice Trutmann	1,162	6.6	+6.6
Total formal votes		17,703	94.3	
Informal votes		1,071	5.7	
Turnout		18,774	88.5	
Two-party-preferred result
Liberal	Bill Grayden	10,846	61.3	+6.0
Labor	Joan Davison	6,857	38.7	−6.0
Liberal hold		Swing	+6.0	

=== Stirling ===
1989 Western Australian state election: Stirling
Party	Candidate	Votes	%	±%
National	Monty House	4,090	42.4	−19.1
Liberal	Thomas Knight	2,870	29.8	−7.0
Labor	Lesley-Ann Hoare	2,060	21.4	+19.8
Grey Power	Paul Ensor	619	6.4	+6.4
Total formal votes		9,639	95.4	
Informal votes		466	4.6	
Turnout		10,105	92.7	
Two-candidate-preferred result
National	Monty House	6,278	65.1	+2.2
Liberal	Thomas Knight	3,361	34.9	−2.2
National hold		Swing	+2.2	

=== Swan Hills ===
1989 Western Australian state election: Swan Hills
Party	Candidate	Votes	%	±%
Labor	Gavan Troy	8,532	48.5	−10.7
Liberal	Neil Oliver	7,526	42.7	+4.4
Grey Power	Eric Ridgway	1,547	8.8	+8.8
Total formal votes		17,605	92.6	
Informal votes		1,414	7.4	
Turnout		19,019	91.1	
Two-party-preferred result
Labor	Gavan Troy	9,067	51.5	−9.0
Liberal	Neil Oliver	8,538	48.5	+9.0
Labor hold		Swing	−9.0	

=== Thornlie ===
1989 Western Australian state election: Thornlie
Party	Candidate	Votes	%	±%
Labor	Yvonne Henderson	8,174	53.9	−13.4
Liberal	Antony York	5,443	35.9	+3.2
Grey Power	Phillip Giblett	1,561	10.3	+10.3
Total formal votes		15,178	89.7	
Informal votes		1,738	10.3	
Turnout		16,916	92.1	
Two-party-preferred result
Labor	Yvonne Henderson	8,705	57.4	−9.9
Liberal	Antony York	6,473	42.6	+9.9
Labor hold		Swing	−9.9	

=== Vasse ===
1989 Western Australian state election: Vasse
Party	Candidate	Votes	%	±%
Liberal	Barry Blaikie	5,205	56.9	−5.4
Labor	Leslie Longwood	2,568	28.1	−9.6
National	Alan Hillier	1,380	15.1	+15.1
Total formal votes		9,153	95.0	
Informal votes		486	5.0	
Turnout		9,639	93.6	
Two-party-preferred result
Liberal	Barry Blaikie	6,292	68.7	+6.4
Labor	Leslie Longwood	2,861	31.3	−6.4
Liberal hold		Swing	+6.4	

=== Victoria Park ===
1989 Western Australian state election: Victoria Park
Party	Candidate	Votes	%	±%
Labor	Geoff Gallop	9,130	49.0	−13.7
Liberal	Katherine Mair	6,846	36.7	−0.6
Democrats	Marion Hercock	1,035	5.6	+5.6
Grey Power	Joseph Mitchell	951	5.1	+5.1
Independent	Michael Ward	671	3.6	+3.6
Total formal votes		18,633	91.5	
Informal votes		1,736	8.5	
Turnout		20,369	89.0	
Two-party-preferred result
Labor	Geoff Gallop	10,692	57.4	−5.3
Liberal	Katherine Mair	7,941	42.6	+5.3
Labor hold		Swing	−5.3	

=== Wagin ===
1989 Western Australian state election: Wagin
Party	Candidate	Votes	%	±%
National	Bob Wiese	5,346	51.3	+11.1
Liberal	John Chamberlain	3,049	29.3	−10.8
Labor	David Whitney	2,024	19.4	−0.2
Total formal votes		10,419	94.0	
Informal votes		659	6.0	
Turnout		11,078	93.0	
Two-candidate-preferred result
National	Bob Wiese	7,094	68.1	+11.2
Liberal	John Chamberlain	3,325	31.9	−11.2
National hold		Swing	+11.2	

=== Wanneroo ===
1989 Western Australian state election: Wanneroo
Party	Candidate	Votes	%	±%
Labor	Jackie Watkins	7,613	47.1	−9.4
Liberal	Brian Cooper	6,497	40.2	+2.3
Grey Power	Peter Rowlands	1,169	7.2	+7.2
Independent	Henrietta Waters	897	5.6	+5.6
Total formal votes		16,176	92.0	
Informal votes		1,403	8.0	
Turnout		17,579	92.2	
Two-party-preferred result
Labor	Jackie Watkins	8,349	51.6	−7.3
Liberal	Brian Cooper	7,827	48.4	+7.3
Labor hold		Swing	−7.3	

=== Warren ===
1989 Western Australian state election: Warren
Party	Candidate	Votes	%	±%
Liberal	Paul Omodei	5,105	53.2	+3.6
Labor	John Towie	3,568	37.2	−10.5
National	Donald Hancock	928	9.7	+9.7
Total formal votes		9,601	95.0	
Informal votes		504	5.0	
Turnout		10,105	93.6	
Two-party-preferred result
Liberal	Paul Omodei	5,838	60.8	+9.8
Labor	John Towie	3,763	39.2	−9.8
Liberal hold		Swing	+9.8	

- In the redistribution, Warren became a notional Liberal seat.

=== Wellington ===
1989 Western Australian state election: Wellington
Party	Candidate	Votes	%	±%
Liberal	John Bradshaw	5,625	63.1	+0.2
Labor	Ronald Mitchell	2,714	30.5	−6.6
Grey Power	Wesley Betterton	570	6.4	+6.4
Total formal votes		8,909	93.3	
Informal votes		642	6.7	
Turnout		9,551	93.0	
Two-party-preferred result
Liberal	John Bradshaw	6,013	67.5	+4.6
Labor	Ronald Mitchell	2,896	32.5	−4.6
Liberal hold		Swing	+4.6	

=== Whitford ===
1989 Western Australian state election: Whitford
Party	Candidate	Votes	%	±%
Labor	Pam Beggs	7,065	43.7	−18.0
Liberal	Peter Harrop	5,670	35.1	+2.1
Independent	John Clifford	2,501	15.5	+15.5
Grey Power	Geoffrey Smart	926	5.7	+5.7
Total formal votes		16,162	93.8	
Informal votes		1,071	6.2	
Turnout		17,233	92.1	
Two-party-preferred result
Labor	Pam Beggs	8,356	51.7	−12.7
Liberal	Peter Harrop	7,806	48.3	+12.7
Labor hold		Swing	−12.7	

== See also ==
- Results of the Western Australian state election, 1989 (Legislative Council)
- 1989 Western Australian state election
- Candidates of the Western Australian state election, 1989
- Members of the Western Australian Legislative Assembly, 1989–1993
