= Members of the Western Australian Legislative Assembly, 1989–1993 =

This is a list of members of the Western Australian Legislative Assembly from 1989 to 1993:

Name	Party	District	Years in office
Ross Ainsworth	National	Roe	1989–2005
Ian Alexander	Labor/Independent^{[5]}	Perth	1987–1993
Colin Barnett^{[4]}	Liberal	Cottesloe	1990–2018
Mike Barnett	Labor	Rockingham	1974–1996
Pam Beggs	Labor	Whitford	1983–1993
Barry Blaikie	Liberal	Vasse	1971–1996
Bob Bloffwitch^{[6]}	Liberal	Geraldton	1991–2001
John Bradshaw	Liberal	Wellington	1983–2005
Ernie Bridge	Labor	Kimberley	1980–2001
Pam Buchanan^{[8]}	Labor/Independent^{[5]}	Ashburton	1983–1992
Jeff Carr^{[6]}	Labor	Geraldton	1974–1991
Nick Catania	Labor	Balcatta	1989–1996
Jim Clarko	Liberal	Marmion	1974–1996
Liz Constable^{[7]}	Independent	Floreat	1991–2013
Richard Court	Liberal	Nedlands	1982–2001
Hendy Cowan	National	Merredin	1974–2001
Ted Cunningham	Labor	Marangaroo	1988–2001
Frank Donovan	Labor/Independent^{[5]}	Morley	1987–1993
Peter Dowding^{[1]}	Labor	Maylands	1986–1990
Cheryl Edwardes	Liberal	Kingsley	1989–2005
Judy Edwards^{[1]}	Labor	Maylands	1990–2008
Geoff Gallop	Labor	Victoria Park	1986–2006
Larry Graham	Labor	Pilbara	1989–2005
Bill Grayden	Liberal	South Perth	1947–1949; 1956–1993
Julian Grill	Labor	Eyre	1977–2001
Bill Hassell^{[4]}	Liberal	Cottesloe	1977–1990
Yvonne Henderson	Labor	Thornlie	1983–1996
Gordon Hill	Labor	Helena	1982–1994
Monty House	National	Stirling	1986–2005
Graham Kierath	Liberal	Riverton	1989–2001
John Kobelke	Labor	Nollamara	1989–2013
Carmen Lawrence	Labor	Glendalough	1986–1994
Kevin Leahy	Labor	Northern Rivers	1989–1996
Richard Lewis	Liberal	Applecross	1986–1996
Barry MacKinnon	Liberal	Jandakot	1977–1993
Norm Marlborough	Labor	Peel	1986–2006
Jim McGinty^{[2]}	Labor	Fremantle	1990–2009
Bill McNee	Liberal	Moore	1983–1986; 1989–2005
Andrew Mensaros^{[7]}	Liberal	Floreat	1968–1991
Kevin Minson	Liberal	Greenough	1989–2001
Roger Nicholls	Liberal	Mandurah	1989–2001
Paul Omodei	Liberal	Warren	1989–2008
David Parker^{[2]}	Labor	Fremantle	1980–1990
Bob Pearce	Labor	Armadale	1977–1993
Keith Read	Labor	Murray	1989–1993
Fred Riebeling^{[8]}	Labor	Ashburton	1992–2008
Eric Ripper	Labor	Belmont	1988–2013
Doug Shave	Liberal	Melville	1989–2001
David Smith	Labor	Mitchell	1983–1996
Phil Smith	Labor	Bunbury	1983–1993
George Strickland	Liberal	Scarborough	1989–2001
Ian Taylor	Labor	Kalgoorlie	1981–1996
Bill Thomas	Labor	Cockburn	1986–2001
Ian Thompson	Liberal/Independent^{[3]}	Darling Range	1971–1993
Max Trenorden	National	Avon	1986–2008
Gavan Troy	Labor	Swan Hills	1983–1993
Fred Tubby	Liberal	Roleystone	1988–2001
Hilda Turnbull	National	Collie	1989–2001
Judyth Watson	Labor	Kenwick	1986–1996
Jackie Watkins	Labor	Wanneroo	1983–1993
Leo Watt	Liberal	Albany	1974–1993
Bob Wiese	National	Wagin	1987–2001
Keith Wilson	Labor	Dianella	1977–1993

== Notes ==
^{1} On 26 April 1990, the Labor member for Maylands, former Premier Peter Dowding, resigned. Labor candidate Judy Edwards won the resulting by-election on 26 May 1990.
^{2} On 26 April 1990, the Labor member for Fremantle, former Deputy Premier David Parker, resigned. Labor candidate Jim McGinty won the resulting by-election on 26 May 1990.
^{3} On 29 September 1989, the Liberal member for Darling Range, Ian Thompson, left his party and served out his term as an independent.
^{4} On 28 June 1990, the Liberal member for Cottesloe, Bill Hassell, resigned. Liberal candidate Colin Barnett won the resulting by-election on 11 August 1990.
^{5} Three members left the Labor Party in 1991 for differing reasons to sit as independents—Pam Buchanan (Ashburton) on 1 February 1991 due to anger over Premier Carmen Lawrence's handling of a cabinet reshuffle, Ian Alexander (Perth) on 4 March 1991 due to his views on the WA Inc scandal, and Frank Donovan (Morley) on 9 October 1991 due to Bob Hawke's role in supporting the Gulf War.
^{6} On 28 February 1991, the Labor member for Geraldton, Jeff Carr, resigned. Liberal candidate Bob Bloffwitch won the resulting by-election on 13 April 1991.
^{7} On 16 May 1991, the Liberal member for Floreat, Andrew Mensaros, resigned due to ill-health (he died 13 days later). After a considerable drama involving the Liberal preselection for the safe seat, Independent candidate Liz Constable won the resulting by-election on 20 July 1991.
^{8} On 3 March 1992, the Independent (formerly Labor) member for Ashburton, Pam Buchanan, resigned due to ill-health (she died four weeks later). Labor candidate Fred Riebeling won the resulting by-election on 4 April 1992.

== Sources ==
- "Former Members" (PDF). Parliament of Western Australia. 2011. Archived from the original (PDF) on 7 August 2011.
