= Electoral results for the district of Belmont =

Western Australian district election results

This is a list of results for the electoral district of Belmont in Western Australian state elections. The district has had two incarnations, the first from 1962 to 1974, the second from 1989 to the present.

== Members for Belmont ==
First incarnation (1962–1974)
Member	Party	Term
James Hegney	Labor	1962–1968
Colin Jamieson	Labor	1968–1974
Second incarnation (1989–present)
Eric Ripper	Labor	1989–2013
Glenys Godfrey	Liberal	2013–2017
Cassie Rowe	Labor	2017–present

== Election results ==
=== Elections in the 2020s ===
2025 Western Australian state election: Belmont
Party	Candidate	Votes	%	±%
Labor	Cassie Rowe	12,805	53.7	−17.0
Liberal	Biju Anthony	5,472	23.0	+7.1
Greens	Helen Olivieri	3,630	15.2	+8.4
One Nation	Liviu Filip Tomules	1,227	5.1	+3.3
Christians	Nathanael Yap	709	3.0	+0.6
Total formal votes		23,843	95.2	−0.7
Informal votes		1,212	4.8	+0.7
Turnout		25,055	80.7	+2.0
Two-party-preferred result
Labor	Cassie Rowe	16,404	68.5	−10.9
Liberal	Biju Anthony	7,528	31.5	+10.9
Labor hold		Swing	−10.9	

Results are not final. Last updated on 26 March 2025 at 5:30 PM AWST

2021 Western Australian state election: Belmont
Party	Candidate	Votes	%	±%
Labor	Cassie Rowe	16,722	70.4	+21.3
Liberal	Charlotte Butler	3,819	16.1	−14.2
Greens	Clint Uink	1,651	7.0	−0.6
Christians	Nitasha Naidu	566	2.4	+0.5
One Nation	Chris Fenech	433	1.8	−4.7
No Mandatory Vaccination	Shaun Rose	374	1.6	+1.6
WAxit	Mohammed Boksmati	174	0.7	−0.6
Total formal votes		23,739	95.9	+1.1
Informal votes		1,019	4.1	−1.1
Turnout		24,758	82.5	+1.2
Two-party-preferred result
Labor	Cassie Rowe	18,795	79.2	+17.8
Liberal	Charlotte Butler	4,938	20.8	−17.8
Labor hold		Swing	+17.8	

=== Elections in the 2010s ===
2017 Western Australian state election: Belmont
Party	Candidate	Votes	%	±%
Labor	Cassie Rowe	10,546	49.2	+6.9
Liberal	Glenys Godfrey	6,500	30.3	−17.0
Greens	Bhuwan Khadka	1,620	7.6	−0.6
One Nation	Julie Mitchell	1,398	6.5	+6.5
Christians	Sue Fraser	394	1.8	−0.4
Shooters, Fishers, Farmers	Ian Blevin	356	1.7	+1.7
Animal Justice	Brigit Anderson	355	1.7	+1.7
Micro Business	Miral Soboh	281	1.3	+1.3
Total formal votes		21,450	94.8	+1.5
Informal votes		1,169	5.2	−1.5
Turnout		22,619	84.5	−0.3
Two-party-preferred result
Labor	Cassie Rowe	13,162	61.4	+12.4
Liberal	Glenys Godfrey	8,273	38.6	−12.4
Labor gain from Liberal		Swing	+12.4	

2013 Western Australian state election: Belmont
Party	Candidate	Votes	%	±%
Liberal	Glenys Godfrey	8,677	47.1	+13.2
Labor	Cassie Rowe	7,826	42.5	−1.0
Greens	Steve Wolff	1,503	8.2	−4.0
Christians	Steve Klomp	421	2.3	−0.8
Total formal votes		18,427	93.33	+0.34
Informal votes		1,317	6.67	−0.34
Turnout		19,744	87.48	+2.02
Two-party-preferred result
Liberal	Glenys Godfrey	9,376	50.9	+7.6
Labor	Cassie Rowe	9,046	49.1	−7.6
Liberal gain from Labor		Swing	+7.6	

=== Elections in the 2000s ===
2008 Western Australian state election: Belmont
Party	Candidate	Votes	%	±%
Labor	Eric Ripper	7,650	43.54	−10.6
Liberal	Edward Richards	5,953	33.88	+2.9
Greens	Louise Judge	2,143	12.20	+4.5
Family First	John Yarrow	677	3.85	+3.85
Independent	John Gleeson	603	3.43	+3.43
Christian Democrats	Tasman Gilbert	543	3.09	−1.0
Total formal votes		17,569	92.99	
Informal votes		1,325	7.01	
Turnout		18,894	85.46	
Two-party-preferred result
Labor	Eric Ripper	9,962	56.74	−5.0
Liberal	Edward Richards	7,596	43.26	+5.0
Labor hold		Swing	−5.0	

2005 Western Australian state election: Belmont
Party	Candidate	Votes	%	±%
Labor	Eric Ripper	12,162	52.94	+1.13
Liberal	Glenys Godfrey	7,231	31.47	+7.03
Greens	Steve Wolff	1,835	7.99	+2.28
Christian Democrats	Gwen Hamence	975	4.24	+1.17
One Nation	Bill Gaugg	772	3.36	–7.47
Total formal votes		22,975	94.49	+0.42
Informal votes		1,341	5.51	–0.42
Turnout		24,316	90.13	–0.71
Two-party-preferred result
Labor	Eric Ripper	13,952	60.81	–3.91
Liberal	Glenys Godfrey	8,992	39.19	+3.91
Labor hold		Swing	–3.91	

2001 Western Australian state election: Belmont
Party	Candidate	Votes	%	±%
Labor	Eric Ripper	11,363	51.8	+3.8
Liberal	Glenys Godfrey	5,360	24.4	−12.5
One Nation	Bill Gaugg	2,375	10.8	+10.8
Greens	Cliff Holdom	1,253	5.7	−2.7
Democrats	Richard Aguero	909	4.1	−2.6
Christian Democrats	Brett Crook	673	3.1	+3.1
Total formal votes		21,933	94.1	+0.2
Informal votes		1,383	5.9	−0.2
Turnout		23,316	90.9	
Two-party-preferred result
Labor	Eric Ripper	14,049	64.7	+7.2
Liberal	Glenys Godfrey	7,659	35.3	−7.2
Labor hold		Swing	+7.2	

=== Elections in the 1990s ===
1996 Western Australian state election: Belmont
Party	Candidate	Votes	%	±%
Labor	Eric Ripper	9,910	48.0	−1.2
Liberal	Andrew Murfin	7,605	36.9	−1.8
Greens	Teresa Castillo	1,729	8.4	+3.8
Democrats	Val Preston	1,385	6.7	+4.4
Total formal votes		20,629	93.8	−0.9
Informal votes		1,357	6.2	+0.9
Turnout		21,986	90.4	
Two-party-preferred result
Labor	Eric Ripper	11,834	57.5	+2.1
Liberal	Andrew Murfin	8,736	42.5	−2.1
Labor hold		Swing	+2.1	

1993 Western Australian state election: Belmont
Party	Candidate	Votes	%	±%
Labor	Eric Ripper	8,710	48.8	−4.2
Liberal	Don Randall	6,941	38.9	+7.0
Independent	Malcolm Meikle	967	5.4	+5.4
Greens	John Riordan	821	4.6	+4.6
Democrats	Kathleen Hill	414	2.3	−1.8
Total formal votes		17,853	94.9	+7.0
Informal votes		953	5.1	−7.0
Turnout		18,806	93.7	+2.1
Two-party-preferred result
Labor	Eric Ripper	9,789	54.8	−5.7
Liberal	Don Randall	8,064	45.2	+5.7
Labor hold		Swing	−5.7	

=== Elections in the 1980s ===
1989 Western Australian state election: Belmont
Party	Candidate	Votes	%	±%
Labor	Eric Ripper	9,072	53.0	−14.5
Liberal	Brett Whitford	5,455	31.9	−0.6
Grey Power	Margaret Bright	1,527	8.9	+8.9
Democrats	Barbara Turner	699	4.1	+4.1
Independent	Clem Cumbo	367	2.1	+2.1
Total formal votes		17,120	87.9	
Informal votes		2,350	12.1	
Turnout		19,470	91.6	
Two-party-preferred result
Labor	Eric Ripper	10,358	60.5	−7.0
Liberal	Brett Whitford	6,762	39.5	+7.0
Labor hold		Swing	−7.0	

=== Elections in the 1970s ===
1971 Western Australian state election: Belmont
Party	Candidate	Votes	%	±%
Labor	Colin Jamieson	7,849	61.3	−3.2
Independent	Arthur Pearson	2,518	19.7	+19.7
Democratic Labor	Maxine Chamberlain	2,434	19.0	+19.0
Total formal votes		12,801	95.1	−2.5
Informal votes		661	4.9	+2.5
Turnout		13,462	91.3	−0.9
Two-candidate-preferred result
Labor	Colin Jamieson	8,458	66.1	+1.6
Independent	Arthur Pearson	4,343	33.9	+33.9
Labor hold		Swing	N/A	

=== Elections in the 1960s ===
1968 Western Australian state election: Belmont
Party	Candidate	Votes	%	±%
Labor	Colin Jamieson	7,105	64.5	
Liberal and Country	Bruce Tomlinson	3,905	35.5	
Total formal votes		11,010	97.6	
Informal votes		265	2.4	
Turnout		11,275	92.2	
Labor hold		Swing		

1965 Western Australian state election: Belmont
Party	Candidate	Votes	%	±%
Labor	James Hegney	5,743	52.3	−1.3
Liberal and Country	Boyd Buttsworth	5,246	47.7	+47.7
Total formal votes		10,989	95.9	−0.4
Informal votes		464	4.1	+0.4
Turnout		11,453	93.2	−1.9
Labor hold		Swing	N/A	

1962 Western Australian state election: Belmont
Party	Candidate	Votes	%	±%
Labor	James Hegney	5,143	53.6	
Independent	Hudson Hudson-Taylor	2,051	21.4	
Independent Labor	Patrick Faulkner	1,198	12.5	
Democratic Labor	Stanley Meredith	841	8.8	
Independent Labor	Michael Coffey	360	3.8	
Total formal votes		9,593	96.3	
Informal votes		372	3.7	
Turnout		9,965	95.1	
Labor hold		Swing		

- Preferences were not distributed.
