= Electoral results for the district of Roleystone =

Western Australian district election results

This is a list of electoral results for the Electoral district of Roleystone in Western Australian state elections.

== Members for Roleystone ==
Member	Party	Term
Fred Tubby	Liberal	1989–2001
Martin Whitely	Labor	2001–2005

== Election results ==
=== Elections in the 2000s ===
2001 Western Australian state election: Roleystone
Party	Candidate	Votes	%	±%
Labor	Martin Whitely	8,759	38.5	+5.7
Liberal	Fred Tubby	7,385	32.4	−15.9
One Nation	Bill Cox	2,654	11.7	+11.7
Greens	Margo Beilby	2,109	9.3	−1.2
Democrats	Gaye Cranfield	772	3.4	−4.9
Christian Democrats	Craig Watson	738	3.2	+3.2
Seniors Party	Bill Love	363	1.6	+1.6
Total formal votes		22,780	95.1	+0.1
Informal votes		1,182	4.9	−0.1
Turnout		23,962	91.7	
Two-party-preferred result
Labor	Martin Whitely	12,374	54.9	+12.1
Liberal	Fred Tubby	10,176	45.1	−12.1
Labor gain from Liberal		Swing	+12.1	

=== Elections in the 1990s ===
1996 Western Australian state election: Roleystone
Party	Candidate	Votes	%	±%
Liberal	Fred Tubby	10,164	48.3	−0.1
Labor	Tom Hoyer	6,902	32.8	−4.4
Greens	Catherine Hall	2,215	10.5	+7.9
Democrats	Tony Bloomer	1,742	8.3	+5.6
Total formal votes		21,023	94.9	−0.5
Informal votes		1,125	5.1	+0.5
Turnout		22,148	91.1	
Two-party-preferred result
Liberal	Fred Tubby	11,994	57.2	+1.7
Labor	Tom Hoyer	8,960	42.8	−1.7
Liberal hold		Swing	+1.7	

1993 Western Australian state election: Roleystone
Party	Candidate	Votes	%	±%
Liberal	Fred Tubby	9,265	48.8	+4.7
Labor	Michael Duxbury	7,615	40.1	−2.3
Independent	Michael Devereux	782	4.1	+4.1
Independent	Karen Nielsen	747	3.9	+3.9
Democrats	Raymond Tilbury	586	3.1	+3.1
Total formal votes		18,995	96.2	+4.0
Informal votes		753	3.8	−4.0
Turnout		19,748	93.8	+1.7
Two-party-preferred result
Liberal	Fred Tubby	10,252	54.0	+2.3
Labor	Michael Duxbury	8,743	46.0	−2.3
Liberal hold		Swing	+2.3	

=== Elections in the 1980s ===
1989 Western Australian state election: Roleystone
Party	Candidate	Votes	%	±%
Liberal	Fred Tubby	7,557	44.1	+1.9
Labor	Roger Stubbs	7,268	42.4	−13.1
Grey Power	Frederick Betts	1,419	8.3	+8.3
Independent	Edna Stevens	448	2.6	+2.6
Independent	Maralyn Yorston	446	2.6	+2.6
Total formal votes		17,138	92.2	
Informal votes		1,444	7.8	
Turnout		18,582	92.1	
Two-party-preferred result
Liberal	Fred Tubby	8,863	51.7	+8.4
Labor	Roger Stubbs	8,275	48.3	−8.4
Liberal gain from Labor		Swing	+8.4	
