= Electoral results for the district of Dale =

Western Australian district election results

This is a list of electoral results for the Electoral district of Dale in Western Australian state elections.

== Members for Dale ==
Member	Party	Term
Gerald Wild	Liberal Country League	1950–1965
Cyril Rushton	Liberal Country League	1965–1968
Cyril Rushton	Liberal	1968–1988
Fred Tubby	Liberal	1988–1989

== Election results ==
=== Elections in the 1980s ===
1988 Dale state by-election
Party	Candidate	Votes	%	±%
Liberal	Fred Tubby	5,323	53.2	+3.4
Independent	Michael Marsh	2,561	25.6	+25.6
Democrats	Mark Beadle	918	9.2	+5.6
Independent	Alexander Coffey	639	6.4	+6.4
One Australia	Willem Schultink	438	4.4	+4.4
Independent	Maralyn	124	1.2	+1.2
Total formal votes		10,003	95.5	−1.9
Informal votes		469	4.5	+1.9
Turnout		10,472	79.0	−13.9
Two-candidate-preferred result
Liberal	Fred Tubby	5,913	59.1	+7.5
Independent	Michael Marsh	4,090	40.9	+40.9
Liberal hold		Swing	N/A	

1986 Western Australian state election: Dale
Party	Candidate	Votes	%	±%
Liberal	Cyril Rushton	5,547	49.8	+2.1
Labor	Philip Vincent	5,175	46.5	−1.4
Democrats	Mark Beadle	405	3.6	−0.8
Total formal votes		11,127	97.4	+0.3
Informal votes		293	2.6	−0.3
Turnout		11,420	92.9	+3.4
Two-party-preferred result
Liberal	Cyril Rushton	5,741	51.6	+1.5
Labor	Philip Vincent	5,386	48.4	−1.5
Liberal hold		Swing	+1.5	

1983 Western Australian state election: Dale
Party	Candidate	Votes	%	±%
Labor	Philip Vincent	4,089	47.9	
Liberal	Cyril Rushton	4,075	47.7	
Democrats	Joan Farrelly	378	4.4	
Total formal votes		8,542	97.1	
Informal votes		258	2.9	
Turnout		8,800	89.5	
Two-party-preferred result
Liberal	Cyril Rushton	4,276	50.1	
Labor	Philip Vincent	4,266	49.9	
Liberal hold		Swing		

1980 Western Australian state election: Dale
Party	Candidate	Votes	%	±%
Liberal	Cyril Rushton	4,098	53.3	−3.9
Labor	David Carlson	3,585	46.7	+3.9
Total formal votes		7,683	97.0	+0.1
Informal votes		239	3.0	−0.1
Turnout		7,922	89.9	−1.0
Liberal hold		Swing	−3.9	

=== Elections in the 1970s ===
1977 Western Australian state election: Dale
Party	Candidate	Votes	%	±%
Liberal	Cyril Rushton	3,751	57.2	
Labor	Michael Marsh	2,804	42.8	
Total formal votes		6,555	96.9	
Informal votes		210	3.1	
Turnout		6,765	90.9	
Liberal hold		Swing	+2.4	

1974 Western Australian state election: Dale
Party	Candidate	Votes	%	±%
Liberal	Cyril Rushton	4,730	51.0	
Labor	Reginald Ewers	3,944	42.5	
National Alliance	June Fitzgerald	598	6.5	
Total formal votes		9,272	94.6	
Informal votes		532	5.4	
Turnout		9,804	91.6	
Two-party-preferred result
Liberal	Cyril Rushton	5,238	56.5	
Labor	Reginald Ewers	4,034	43.5	
Liberal hold		Swing		

1971 Western Australian state election: Dale
Party	Candidate	Votes	%	±%
Liberal	Cyril Rushton	5,300	48.4	−17.0
Labor	Owen Hanlon	4,155	37.5	+2.9
Law Reform	Joseph Hunt	604	5.5	+5.5
Independent	Ian Trainer	511	4.7	+4.7
Democratic Labor	Rose Johnson	382	3.5	+3.5
Total formal votes		10,952	96.5	+0.7
Informal votes		401	3.5	−0.7
Turnout		11,353	91.4	−4.0
Two-party-preferred result
Liberal	Cyril Rushton	6,136	56.0	−9.4
Labor	Owen Hanlon	4,816	44.0	+9.4
Liberal hold		Swing	−9.4	

=== Elections in the 1960s ===
1968 Western Australian state election: Dale
Party	Candidate	Votes	%	±%
Liberal and Country	Cyril Rushton	4,260	65.4	
Labor	James Wolfe	2,255	34.6	
Total formal votes		6,515	95.8	
Informal votes		288	4.2	
Turnout		6,803	95.4	
Liberal and Country hold		Swing		

1965 Western Australian state election: Dale
Party	Candidate	Votes	%	±%
Liberal and Country	Gerald Wild	3,536	59.8	+1.2
Labor	Donald Culley	2,380	40.2	−1.2
Total formal votes		5,916	96.9	−2.0
Informal votes		187	3.1	+2.0
Turnout		6,103	92.1	−1.4
Liberal and Country hold		Swing	+1.2	

1962 Western Australian state election: Dale
Party	Candidate	Votes	%	±%
Liberal and Country	Gerald Wild	3,084	58.6	
Labor	Donald Culley	2,181	41.4	
Total formal votes		5,265	98.9	
Informal votes		57	1.1	
Turnout		5,322	93.5	
Liberal and Country hold		Swing		

=== Elections in the 1950s ===
1959 Western Australian state election: Dale
Party	Candidate	Votes	%	±%
Liberal and Country	Gerald Wild	2,626	45.4	−11.3
Country	Arthur Mills	1,450	25.1	+25.1
Independent Labor	William Williams	1,054	18.2	+18.2
Country	Andrew McPhail	653	11.3	+11.3
Total formal votes		5,783	96.8	−0.4
Informal votes		188	3.2	+0.4
Turnout		5,971	93.6	+1.0
Two-candidate-preferred result
Liberal and Country	Gerald Wild	3,065	53.0	−3.7
Country	Arthur Mills	2,718	47.0	+47.0
Liberal and Country hold		Swing	N/A	

1956 Western Australian state election: Dale
Party	Candidate	Votes	%	±%
Liberal and Country	Gerald Wild	2,911	56.7	
Independent	Ivan Locke	2,221	43.3	
Total formal votes		5,132	97.2	
Informal votes		146	2.8	
Turnout		5,278	92.6	
Liberal and Country hold		Swing		

1953 Western Australian state election: Dale
Party	Candidate	Votes	%	±%
Liberal and Country	Gerald Wild	3,205	57.3	−1.1
Labor	Ronald Knowler	2,389	42.7	+14.6
Total formal votes		5,594	97.7	−0.5
Informal votes		134	2.3	+0.5
Turnout		5,728	92.5	+1.6
Liberal and Country hold		Swing	−13.3	

1950 Western Australian state election: Dale
Party	Candidate	Votes	%	±%
Liberal and Country	Gerald Wild	2,869	58.4	
Labor	Ronald Knowler	1,379	28.1	
Country	John Ellis	661	13.5	
Total formal votes		4,909	98.2	
Informal votes		89	1.8	
Turnout		4,998	90.9	
Two-party-preferred result
Liberal and Country	Gerald Wild		70.6	
Labor	Ronald Knowler		29.4	
Liberal and Country hold		Swing		

- Two party preferred vote was estimated.
