= Electoral results for the district of Bassendean =

Western Australian district election results

This is a list of electoral results for the electoral district of Bassendean in Western Australian state elections.

== Members for Bassendean ==
Member	Party	Term
Clive Brown	Labor	1996–2005
Martin Whitely	Labor	2005–2013
Dave Kelly	Labor	2013–present

== Election results ==
=== Elections in the 2020s ===
2025 Western Australian state election: Bassendean
Party	Candidate	Votes	%	±%
Labor	Dave Kelly	13,961	52.3	−19.0
Liberal	Ash Kumar	4,220	15.8	+3.7
Independent	Renée McLennan	3,083	11.5	+11.5
Greens	Callan Gray	2,854	10.7	+2.9
One Nation	Chris Fenech	1,301	4.9	+2.9
Christians	David Kingston	1,300	4.9	+1.9
Total formal votes		26,719	95.1	−0.3
Informal votes		1,388	4.9	+0.3
Turnout		28,107	86.1	+3.0
Notional two-party-preferred count (Note: Estimated two-party-preferred count by Antony Green.)
Labor	Dave Kelly	19,882	74.5	−7.2
Liberal	Ash Kumar	6,820	25.5	+7.2
Two-candidate-preferred result
Labor	Dave Kelly	17,532	65.7	−16.0
Independent	Renée McLennan	9,163	34.3	+34.3
Labor hold				

2021 Western Australian state election: Bassendean
Party	Candidate	Votes	%	±%
Labor	Dave Kelly	17,094	70.7	+11.2
Liberal	Felicia Adeniyi	2,954	12.2	−10.7
Greens	Charles Pratt	2,005	8.3	−2.6
Christians	Dean Powell	705	2.9	−0.3
No Mandatory Vaccination	Leni Erceg	685	2.8	+2.8
One Nation	Lesley Pallister	486	2.0	+1.7
WAxit	Peter Martin	265	1.1	−1.6
Total formal votes		24,194	95.4	+1.5
Informal votes		1,172	4.6	−1.5
Turnout		25,366	86.0	−2.8
Two-party-preferred result
Labor	Dave Kelly	19,727	81.6	+10.0
Liberal	Felicia Adeniyi	4,452	18.4	−10.0
Labor hold		Swing	+10.0	

=== Elections in the 2010s ===
2017 Western Australian state election: Bassendean
Party	Candidate	Votes	%	±%
Labor	Dave Kelly	13,203	59.1	+12.4
Liberal	Jim Seth	5,192	23.2	−16.3
Greens	Sarah Quinton	2,532	11.3	+1.0
Christians	Paul Mewhor	735	3.3	−0.2
Micro Business	Graeme Martin	680	3.0	+3.0
Total formal votes		22,342	93.9	+2.1
Informal votes		1,455	6.1	−2.1
Turnout		23,797	87.2	−0.2
Two-party-preferred result
Labor	Dave Kelly	15,967	71.5	+16.4
Liberal	Jim Seth	6,365	28.5	−16.4
Labor hold		Swing	+16.4	

2013 Western Australian state election: Bassendean
Party	Candidate	Votes	%	±%
Labor	Dave Kelly	9,663	46.7	–0.7
Liberal	Bob Brown	8,167	39.5	+9.6
Greens	Jennie Carter	2,119	10.2	–4.9
Christians	Paul Mewhor	733	3.5	–1.8
Total formal votes		20,682	91.8	−0.7
Informal votes		1,854	9.1	+0.7
Turnout		22,536	90.1	
Two-party-preferred result
Labor	Dave Kelly	11,397	55.1	–5.2
Liberal	Bob Brown	9,273	44.9	+5.2
Labor hold		Swing	–5.2	

=== Elections in the 2000s ===
2008 Western Australian state election: Bassendean
Party	Candidate	Votes	%	±%
Labor	Martin Whitely	8,973	47.80	−6.2
Liberal	Benjamin Smith	5,751	30.64	+4.1
Greens	Jennie Carter	2,999	15.98	+7.4
Christian Democrats	Paul Mewhor	1,049	5.59	+2.1
Total formal votes		18,772	92.44	−0.88
Informal votes		1,535	7.56	+0.88
Turnout		20,307	87.92	
Two-party-preferred result
Labor	Martin Whitely	11,320	60.33	−1.5
Liberal	Benjamin Smith	7,442	39.67	+1.5
Labor hold		Swing	−1.5	

2005 Western Australian state election: Bassendean
Party	Candidate	Votes	%	±%
Labor	Martin Whitely	12,052	52.9	−2.3
Liberal	Michelle Stubbs	6,283	27.6	+7.0
Greens	Gemma Carter	1,960	8.6	+0.5
Family First	Peter Clifford	1,160	5.1	+5.1
Christian Democrats	Paul Mewhor	778	3.4	+0.5
One Nation	Graeme Harris	533	2.3	−7.0
Total formal votes		22,766	93.3	−0.4
Informal votes		1,630	6.7	+0.4
Turnout		24,396	91.2	
Two-party-preferred result
Labor	Martin Whitely	14,379	63.7	−5.0
Liberal	Michelle Stubbs	8,208	36.3	+5.0
Labor hold		Swing	−5.0	

2001 Western Australian state election: Bassendean
Party	Candidate	Votes	%	±%
Labor	Clive Brown	12,012	56.1	+1.9
Liberal	Ramesh Somasunderam	4,179	19.5	−13.8
One Nation	Sandra Vinciullo	1,979	9.2	+9.2
Greens	Leanne Lewis	1,752	8.2	+8.2
Christian Democrats	Colleen Tapley	752	3.5	+3.5
Democrats	Jack Fox	751	3.5	−9.0
Total formal votes		21,425	93.5	−0.6
Informal votes		1,480	6.5	+0.6
Turnout		22,905	91.2	
Two-party-preferred result
Labor	Clive Brown	14,707	69.1	+7.1
Liberal	Ramesh Somasunderam	6,562	30.9	−7.1
Labor hold		Swing	+7.1	

=== Elections in the 1990s ===
1996 Western Australian state election: Bassendean
Party	Candidate	Votes	%	±%
Labor	Clive Brown	11,349	54.2	+2.1
Liberal	Shane Shenton	6,986	33.3	+0.4
Democrats	Kathy Ready	2,620	12.5	+11.1
Total formal votes		20,955	94.1	−0.7
Informal votes		1,312	5.9	+0.7
Turnout		22,267	91.0	
Two-party-preferred result
Labor	Clive Brown	12,973	62.0	+2.2
Liberal	Shane Shenton	7,945	38.0	−2.2
Labor hold		Swing	+2.2	
