= Electoral results for the district of Marmion =

Western Australian district election results

This is a list of electoral results for the Electoral district of Marmion in Western Australian state elections.

== Members for Marmion ==
Member	Party	Term
Jim Clarko	Liberal	1989–1996

== Election results ==
1993 Western Australian state election: Marmion
Party	Candidate	Votes	%	±%
Liberal	Jim Clarko	14,805	64.9	+8.2
Labor	Kirk Stergiou	5,284	23.2	−6.9
Greens	Vivienne Elanta	1,483	6.5	+0.5
Democrats	Elizabeth Brown	1,221	5.4	+5.4
Total formal votes		22,793	97.4	+3.0
Informal votes		597	2.6	−3.0
Turnout		23,390	94.8	+2.5
Two-party-preferred result
Liberal	Jim Clarko	16,054	70.4	+6.1
Labor	Kirk Stergiou	6,739	29.6	−6.1
Liberal hold		Swing	+6.1	

=== Elections in the 1980s ===
1989 Western Australian state election: Marmion
Party	Candidate	Votes	%	±%
Liberal	Jim Clarko	11,324	56.7	+7.8
Labor	Jonathan Davies	6,016	30.1	−18.0
Grey Power	Eric Hammond	1,426	7.1	+7.1
Greens	Sharon McDonald	1,194	6.0	+6.0
Total formal votes		19,960	94.4	
Informal votes		1,183	5.6	
Turnout		21,143	92.3	
Two-party-preferred result
Liberal	Jim Clarko	12,837	64.3	+13.9
Labor	Jonathan Davies	7,123	35.7	−13.9
Liberal hold		Swing	+13.9	
