= Electoral results for the district of Northern Rivers =

Western Australian district election results

This is a list of electoral results for the Electoral district of Northern Rivers in Western Australian state elections.

== Members for Northern Rivers ==
Member	Party	Term
Kevin Leahy	Labor	1989–1996

== Election results ==
=== Elections in the 1990s ===
1993 Western Australian state election: Northern Rivers
Party	Candidate	Votes	%	±%
Labor	Kevin Leahy	4,307	46.1	−4.5
Liberal	Dudley Maslen	3,657	39.2	−10.2
National	Paquita Boston	677	7.2	+7.2
Greens	Lorraine Hatchwell	424	4.5	+4.5
Democrats	Jill Bond	159	1.7	+1.7
Independent	Nabil Rowland	115	1.2	+1.2
Total formal votes		9,339	96.2	−1.6
Informal votes		372	3.8	+1.6
Turnout		9,711	89.0	+5.8
Two-party-preferred result
Labor	Kevin Leahy	4,835	51.8	+1.2
Liberal	Dudley Maslen	4,504	48.2	−1.2
Labor hold		Swing	+1.2	

=== Elections in the 1980s ===
1989 Western Australian state election: Northern Rivers
Party	Candidate	Votes	%	±%
Labor	Kevin Leahy	4,392	50.6	−3.0
Liberal	Dudley Maslen	4,284	49.4	+4.5
Total formal votes		8,676	97.8	
Informal votes		193	2.2	
Turnout		8,869	83.2	
Labor hold		Swing	−3.8	
