= 1988 Dale state by-election =

A by-election for the seat of Dale in the Legislative Assembly of Western Australia was held on 7 May 1988. It was triggered by the resignation of Cyril Rushton (the sitting Liberal member and a former deputy premier) on 25 February 1988. The seat was retained by the Liberal Party, with their candidate, Fred Tubby, winning 59.1 percent of the two-candidate-preferred (2CP) vote. The Labor Party did not stand at the election, despite having lost the seat by less than 400 votes at the 1986 state election. A former Labor candidate, Michael Marsh, won 40.9 percent of the 2CP vote standing as an independent.

== Background ==
Cyril Rushton had held Dale for the Liberal Party since a 1965 by-election, and served as a minister in the governments of Sir Charles Court and Ray O'Connor (including as deputy premier under the latter). Rushton underwent open-heart surgery in August 1987, and missed much of the following parliamentary session. He resigned from parliament on 25 February 1988, and the writ for the by-election was issued on 30 March, with the close of nominations on 14 April. Polling day was on 7 May, with the writ returned on 12 May.

== Results ==
Dale state by-election, 1988
Party	Candidate	Votes	%	±%
Liberal	Fred Tubby	5,323	53.2	+3.3
Independent	Michael Marsh	2,561	25.6	+25.6
Democrats	Mark Beadle	918	9.2	+6.6
Independent	Alexander Coffey	639	6.4	+6.4
One Australia	Willem Schultink	438	4.4	+4.4
Independent	Maralyn Yorston	124	1.2	+1.2
Total formal votes		10,003	95.5	–1.9
Informal votes		469	4.5	+1.9
Turnout		10,472	79.0	–13.9
Two-candidate-preferred result
Liberal	Fred Tubby	5,913	59.1	N/A
Independent	Michael Marsh	4,090	40.9	+40.9
Liberal hold		Swing	N/A	

== Aftermath ==
Tubby joined his father, Reg Tubby, in parliament, and the pair served together until Reg's retirement at the 1989 state election (a period of less than a year). The seat of Dale was abolished in a redistribution prior to that same election, and Fred Tubby switched to the new seat of Roleystone, which he held until his defeat at the 2001 state election.

== See also ==
- List of Western Australian state by-elections
