= Cyril Rushton =

Australian politician

The Honourable Cyril Rushton

Deputy Premier of Western Australia
- In office 25 January 1982 – 25 February 1983
- Premier: Ray O'Connor
- Preceded by: Ray O'Connor
- Succeeded by: Mal Bryce

Member of the Legislative Assembly of Western Australia
- In office 8 May 1965 – 25 February 1988
- Preceded by: Gerald Wild
- Succeeded by: Fred Tubby
- Constituency: Dale

Personal details
- Born: 23 November 1922 Denmark, Western Australia
- Died: 23 August 1992 (aged 69) Dalkeith, Western Australia
- Party: Liberal

Edgar Cyril Rushton (23 November 1922 – 23 August 1992) was an Australian politician who was a Liberal Party member of the Legislative Assembly of Western Australia from 1965 to 1988. He served as a minister in the governments of Charles Court and Ray O'Connor, including as deputy premier to O'Connor from 1982 to 1983.

== Early life ==
Born in Denmark, in Western Australia's Great Southern region, Rushton attended schools in Denmark, Mount Barker, and Katanning, before boarding at Scotch College in Perth. He served in the military during the Second World War, initially as a signaller in the Australian Army, and then as a navigator (rank leading aircraftman) in the Royal Australian Air Force (RAAF). On returning to Australia, Rushton worked at the Bank of New South Wales, initially in country areas and then closer to Perth. He served on the Armadale-Kelmscott Shire Council 1958 to 1966, including as shire president from 1964 to 1965.

== Politics ==
Rushton joined the Liberal Party in 1947. He was first elected to parliament at the 1965 Dale by-election, which came only three months after the 1965 state election. The previous holder of the seat, Gerald Wild, had resigned from parliament to take up the position of Agent-General for Western Australia. As a new member of parliament, Rushton did not serve as a minister under David Brand. After Charles Court led the Liberal Party to victory at the 1974 state election, he was appointed Minister for Local Government and Minister for Urban Development and Town Planning in the new ministry. The ministry was reconstituted in 1978 after a portfolio reshuffle, and Rushton was named Minister for Transport, with June Craig, the only woman in Cabinet, taking over his portfolios.

Following the 1980 state election, at which the government was again returned, there was speculation that Court would retire. Rushton was considered a candidate to replace him, along with Craig, Bill Grayden, Ray Young, Jim Clarko, and Court's deputy, Ray O'Connor. Court eventually resigned in early 1982. He was replaced by O'Connor, who was elected unopposed, and Rushton was elected deputy leader in a four-way contest. Retaining his transport portfolio, he also served as Deputy Premier and Minister for Emergency Services in O'Connor's new ministry, which was defeated at the following year's election.

With the Liberal Party now in opposition, Rushton was one of four men to contest a leadership ballot in February 1984, along with O'Connor, Bill Hassell, and Barry MacKinnon. Hassell replaced O'Connor as leader of the party and Leader of the Opposition, while MacKinnon replaced Rushton as deputy leader of the party, narrowly defeating Richard Court. Re-elected again at the 1986 state election, Rushton underwent open-heart surgery in August 1987, and, having missed much of the following parliamentary session, resigned on 25 February 1988. The resulting by-election was won by Liberal candidate Fred Tubby, with Labor not fielding a candidate.

== Later life ==
Rushton died in Perth in August 1992, aged 69, and was buried at Karrakatta Cemetery. He had married Elizabeth Melva (Betty) Crouch in 1947, with whom he had four sons and a daughter. They divorced in 1976, and he then remarried to Jean Rachel Evans, in 1977.

Parliament of Western Australia
Preceded by Gerald Wild	Member for Dale; 1965–1988	Succeeded by Fred Tubby
Political offices
Preceded by Ray O'Connor	Deputy Premier; 1982–1983	Succeeded by Mal Bryce
Preceded by Claude Stubbs	Minister for Local Government; 1974–1978	Succeeded by June Craig
Preceded by Ron Davies (as Minister for Town Planning)	Minister for Urban Development and Town Planning; 1974–1978	Succeeded by June Craig
Preceded by David Wordsworth	Minister for Transport; 1978–1983	Succeeded by Julian Grill
Preceded by Bill Hassell (as Minister for Police and Traffic)	Minister for Emergency Services; 1982–1983	Succeeded by Arthur Tonkin (as Minister for Police and Emergency Services)
