= Results of the 1989 Western Australian state election (Legislative Council) =

Western Australian state election, 4 February 1989 Legislative Council
Enrolled voters	957,939				
Votes cast	870,996		Turnout	90.92%	–0.50%
Informal votes	24,061		Informal	2.76%	–0.53%
Summary of votes by party
Party	Primary votes	%	Swing	Seats	Change
Labor	347,675	41.05%	–4.08%	16	+ 1
Liberal	350,053	41.33%	–0.64%	15	± 0
National	42,328	5.00%	+0.24%	3	– 1
Grey Power	34,055	4.02%	+4.02%	0	± 0
Democrats	28,113	3.32%	–4.81%	0	± 0
Greens	27,013	3.19%	+3.19%	0	± 0
One Australia	7,391	0.87%	+0.87%	0	± 0
Independent	10,307	1.22%	+1.21%	0	± 0
Total	846,935			34	

This is a list of electoral region results for the Western Australian Legislative Council in the 1989 Western Australian state election.

This was the last election, as of 2025, in which there was no party other than Labor, Liberal or National in the Legislative Council.

== Results by electoral region ==
=== Agricultural ===
1989 Western Australian state election: Agricultural
Party	Candidate	Votes	%	±%
Quota		12,452		
Liberal	1. Margaret McAleer (elected 1); 2. David Wordsworth (elected 4); 3. Murray Nixon; 4. Ian Whitehurst; 5. Elizabeth Rocchi	30,866	41.29	
National	1. Eric Charlton (elected 2); 2. John Caldwell (elected 5); 3. Dexter Davies; 4. Anthony Critch	20,020	26.78	
Labor	1. James Brown (elected 3); 2. Kim Chance; 3. Lorna Long; 4. John Czuzman; 5. Mary Ridley	19,160	25.63	
One Australia Movement	1. Cedric Jacobs; 2. Margaret Jacobs; 3. Malcolm Taylor	2,119	2.83	
Greens	1. James Cavill; 2. Ronald Lewis	1,302	1.74	
Democrats	Robert Whitehead	1,287	1.72	
Total formal votes		74,754	97.71	
Informal votes		1,750	2.29	
Turnout		76,504	92.13	

=== East Metropolitan ===
1989 Western Australian state election: East Metropolitan
Party	Candidate	Votes	%	±%
Quota		30,318		
Labor	1. Kay Hallahan (elected 1); 2. Fred McKenzie (elected 3); 3. Tom Butler (elected 5); 4. Valma Ferguson; 5. Erik Van Garderen; 6. Stephen Gilchrist	85,987	47.27	
Liberal	1. Derrick Tomlinson (elected 2); 2. Peter Foss (elected 4); 3. June van de Klashorst; 4. Peter Quinn	66,472	36.54	
Grey Power	1. Neil Turner; 2. Arthur Robertson	10,643	5.85	
Democrats	1. Pauline Hutchinson; 2. Benjamin Rose	6,586	3.62	
Greens	1. L G Capill; 2. Patsy Molloy	5,320	2.92	
National	1. Patrick Harding; 2. Beverley Poor	4,179	2.30	
One Australia Movement	1. Donald Jackson; 2. Ronald Abbott	2,720	1.50	
Total formal votes		181,907	97.10	
Informal votes		5,427	2.90	
Turnout		187,334	91.84	

=== Mining and Pastoral ===
1989 Western Australian state election: Mining and Pastoral
Party	Candidate	Votes	%	±%
Quota		8,331		
Labor	1. Tom Stephens (elected 1); 2. Mark Nevill (elected 3); 3. Tom Helm (elected 4); 4. Robert Couzens; 5. Margaret Halid; 6. Sylvia Hurse	26,819	53.65	
Liberal	1. Norman Moore (elected 2); 2. Phil Lockyer (elected 5); 3. Margaret Day; 4. Sally Wilkinson; 5. Louie Carnicelli	16,791	33.59	
National	1. Peter Kneebone; 2. Ronald Smales; 3. John Ford	1,815	3.63	
Greens	1. Leslie Lee; 2. Desmond Hill; 3. Brian Champion; 4. Allan Barker; 5. Jeanette Johnson	1,607	3.21	
Democrats	Shyama Peebles	1,354	2.71	
Independent	Lynton Downe	866	1.73	
One Australia Movement	1. Megan Shedley; 2. Donald Shedley	736	1.47	
Total formal votes		49,988	97.42	
Informal votes		1,325	2.58	
Turnout		51,313	80.91	

=== North Metropolitan ===
1989 Western Australian state election: North Metropolitan
Party	Candidate	Votes	%	±%
Quota		32,457		
Liberal	1. George Cash (elected 1); 2. Max Evans (elected 3); 3. Bob Pike (elected 5); 4. Reg Davies (elected 7); 5. Chris Ellison; 6. Wendy Cole; 7. Robert Burr	115,972	44.66	
Labor	1. Joe Berinson (elected 2); 2. Graham Edwards (elected 4); 3. Sam Piantadosi (elected 6); 4. Kay Lunt; 5. Judith Jones; 6. Nick Griffiths; 7. Malcolm Jackson	101,893	39.24	
Grey Power	1. Phillip King; 2. Kryna Gudgeon	11,260	4.34	
Democrats	1. Richard Jeffreys; 2. Brian Jenkins	8,902	3.43	
Greens	1. Kim Herbert; 2. Nadine Lapthorne	7,927	3.05	
Group A	1. Peter Weygers; 2. John Massam	5,635	2.17	
National	1. Elizabeth Beveridge; 2. Neil Baker; 3. Pamela Eves; 4. Duncan Anderson	3,433	1.32	
Group I	1. Shirley de la Hunty; 2. David Kaesehagen; 3. Norma Rundle	2,482	0.96	
One Australia Movement	1. Ronald Holt; 2. Frank Gould; 3. Leonard Sherwood	1,823	0.70	
Independent	Walter Morris	341	0.13	
Total formal votes		259,658	97.08	
Informal votes		7,800	2.92	
Turnout		267,458	91.01	

=== South Metropolitan ===
1989 Western Australian state election: South Metropolitan
Party	Candidate	Votes	%	±%
Quota		30,790		
Labor	1. Garry Kelly (elected 1); 2. John Halden (elected 3); 3. Cheryl Davenport (elected 5); 4. Ed Dermer; 5. Reginald Gordon; 6. Joyce Edwards	80,221	43.42	
Liberal	1. Clive Griffiths (elected 2); 2. Phillip Pendal (elected 4); 3. Diane Airey; 4. Alan Harste; 5. John Hardwick	77,296	41.84	
Grey Power	Neville Crilly	9,128	4.94	
Democrats	1. Peter Nettleton; 2. David Banner	7,917	4.29	
Alternative Coalition	1. Christabel Bridge; 2. Robert Mann; 3. Gladys Yarran	6,314	3.42	
National	1. Miguel de San Miguel; 2. Leonard Phillips	3,862	2.09	
Total formal votes		184,738	97.18	
Informal votes		5,361	2.82	
Turnout		190,099	91.50	

=== South West ===
1989 Western Australian state election: South West
Party	Candidate	Votes	%	±%
Quota		11,987		
Liberal	1. Barry House (elected 1); 2. Muriel Patterson (elected 3); 3. Bill Stretch (elected 5); 4. Adrian Fawcett; 5. Suzanne Carter; 6. Jonathan Youngs	40,268	41.99	
Labor	1. Doug Wenn (elected 2); 2. Beryl Jones (elected 4); 3. Bob Thomas (elected 6); 4. Josephine Lynch; 5. Dane Carroll	35,966	37.51	
National	1. Murray Montgomery (elected 7); 2. Terence House; 3. Jennifer Barrett	9,029	9.42	
Group D	1. Marie-Louise Duxbury; 2. Lynette Serventy	4,549	4.74	
Grey Power	Herbert Cattrall	3,024	3.15	
Democrats	1. David Churches; 2. Daphne Wallace	2,065	2.15	
Independent	Paul Roth	992	1.03	
Total formal votes		95,894	97.56	
Informal votes		2,394	2.44	
Turnout		98,288	92.83	

== See also ==
- Results of the Western Australian state election, 1989 (Legislative Assembly A-L)
- Results of the Western Australian state election, 1989 (Legislative Assembly M-Z)
- 1989 Western Australian state election
- Candidates of the Western Australian state election, 1989
- Members of the Western Australian Legislative Council, 1989–1993
