= List of mayors of Armadale =

The City of Armadale in Perth, Western Australia was originally established on 14 December 1894 as the Kelmscott Road District, with a chairman and councillors, under the District Roads Act 1871. It was renamed "Armadale-Kelmscott Road District" on 24 March 1910. With the passage of the Local Government Act 1960, all road districts became Shires, with a president and councillors, effective 1 July 1961. On 1 July 1979, the Shire of Armadale-Kelmscott became the Town of Armadale, with a mayor and councillors, and on 15 November 1985 it became a City.

== Armadale-Kelmscott Road District ==
Chairman	Term
William Butcher	1894–1899
Joseph Lockyer	1899–1900
Thomas James	1900–1904
Samuel Turner	1904–1907
Thomas James	1907–1917
James Butcher	1917–1920
William Henry Lockard	1920–1922
George E. Harber	1922–1923
William Henry Lockard	1923–1925
Robert Hanham Briggs	1925–1930
William Lambden Owen	1930–1931
Benjamin Vidgin Cross	1931–1932
Robert Hanham Briggs	1933–1936
Richard Knuckey	1936–1938
Walter Alexander Birrell Haynes	1938–1946
Richard Knuckey	1946–1947
Hugh Aitken	1947–1949
Reginald Owen Williams	1949–1951
Oscar Bruns	1951–1954
Warwick Geoffrey Savage	1954–1956
Ronald Durham Ridoutt	1956–1958
Andrew Wood McPhail	1958–1959
Jack Murray	1959–1961

== Shire of Armadale-Kelmscott ==
President	Term
Jack Murray	1961–1964
Cyril Rushton	1964–1965
Peter Kargotich	1965–1973
Stanley Vasse Pries	1973–1978
Ian Blackburn	1978–1979

== Town of Armadale ==
Mayor	Term
Ian Blackburn	1979–1985

== City of Armadale ==
Mayor	Term
Ian Blackburn	1985–1986
Stan Pries	1986–1988
Ian Blackburn	1988–1992
Roger Stubbs	1992–1996
Spike Fokkema	1996–1997
Roger Stubbs	1997–2001
Linton Reynolds	2001–2011
Henry Zelones	2011–2019
Ruth Butterfield	2019–
