= Cassie Rowe =

Australian politician

Cassie Rowe MLA

Member of the Western Australian Legislative Assembly for Belmont
- Incumbent
- Assumed office 11 March 2017
- Preceded by: Glenys Godfrey

Personal details
- Born: 6 September 1980 (age 45) Melbourne, Victoria, Australia
- Party: Labor
- Relations: Samantha Rowe (sister), Barry Rowe (father)
- Website: belmont.walabor.org.au

Cassandra Michelle Rowe (born 6 September 1980) is an Australian politician. She became a Labor member of the Western Australian Legislative Assembly in the 2017 state election, representing Belmont.

== Education and career ==
Rowe holds a Bachelor of Arts from the University of Melbourne and has also studied finance and screenwriting. Prior to entering politics, Rowe worked as a financial planner and served as Assistant State Secretary of WA Labor from 2017 until 2021.

Rowe is a member of the Australian Workers Union (AWU), which is a union part of the Labor Right.

Rowe ran for Belmont, the seat of former Opposition Leader Eric Ripper, in 2013. She narrowly lost to Liberal Glenys Godfrey on an unexpectedly large swing. However, she defeated Godfrey in a 2017 rematch on a swing of over 12 percent, enough to revert Belmont to its traditional status as a comfortably safe Labor seat. Rowe was re-elected in the 2025 Western Australian state election with a first preference vote share of 53.5%.

Rowe served as Government Whip from 17 March 2021 until 29 January 2025. Following the 2025 election, she was appointed as the parliamentary secretary to Minister Simone McGurk.

== Family ==
Her sister, Samantha Rowe, was elected to the Western Australian Legislative Council in 2013 and was her campaign manager in the 2017 state election. Rowe's father, Barry Rowe, was the member for the Victorian state seat of Essendon from 1979 to 1992.

Western Australian Legislative Assembly
Preceded by Glenys Godfrey	Member for Belmont; 2017–present	Incumbent
