= One Australia Movement =

Minor Australian political party (1986–1992)

- Founder: Rev. Cedric Jacobs
- Founded: c. 1985
- Dissolved: c. 1992
- Headquarters: Midland, Western Australia
- Political position: Christian right

The One Australia Movement was a minor Australian political party established in 1985. It was founded by Cedric Jacobs, an Indigenous Australian minister in the Uniting Church of Australia associated with the Aboriginal Evangelical Fellowship. The party was primarily known for its opposition to Indigenous land rights. It contested the 1987 federal election and several state elections in Western Australia without success.

== History ==
The One Australia Movement was active in Western Australia by 1985. Its founder and chairman was Cedric Jacobs, an Indigenous Australian minister in the Uniting Church of Australia. Jacobs was president of the Aboriginal Evangelical Fellowship at the time of the party's foundation and was a former chairman of the National Aboriginal Conference. Other members included Anne Brinkworth, a member of the Bassendean Town Council.

The party was formally registered with the Australian Electoral Commission (AEC) on 3 October 1986. The One Australia Movement fielded three Senate candidates in Western Australia at the 1987 federal election, with its ticket headed by Jacobs and his wife Margaret. It polled 1.6 percent of the statewide vote in Western Australia. At state level, the party contested the Legislative Council at the 1989 Western Australian state election and two by-elections (1987 in Morley-Swan and 1988 in Dale).

The One Australia Movement published a newsletter titled the Link from its headquarters in Midland, Western Australia. The party was deregistered by the AEC on 21 October 1992 for failing to maintain at least 500 members.

== Political positions ==
The One Australia Movement attracted attention for its stance against Aboriginal land rights, with its members "firmly opposed to land rights legislation on the grounds that it purportedly contains strong elements of an apartheid policy with separate geographical areas designated for whites and non-whites". It considered "that the Aboriginal struggle for land rights was a divisive element in Australian society and that Aborigines should forgive and forget the past". Jacobs himself said that "Australian Aborigines ought to thank God that white men brought the Christian faith to the Aboriginal people" and proclaimed that the party was "attracting wide support from both blacks and whites in every state". He also accused the Department of Aboriginal Affairs of discriminating against Aboriginal Christians and stated that it should be abolished with funding instead distributed to local governments.

Jacobs' views brought him into conflict with other Aboriginal leaders. In 1985, Ken Colbung called for an "official investigation" into the OAM, accusing it of "misusing Christianity to belittle their own race". Colbung's associate Neil Phillips accused Jacobs of "brainwashing the Aboriginal people" and said the OAM was a "white-dominated organisation". Jacobs was the national treasurer and a founding member of the Uniting Aboriginal and Islander Christian Congress, but in response to his activism with the OAM he was removed from the national committee and withdrew from the organisation. Charles Enoch Harris, the president of the congress, issued a public statement denouncing the views of the OAM.

Outside of its views on land rights, the party also professed support for the monarchy, a biblical system of morality, immigration reform and social security reform, and opposition to union strike movements.

In 1988, federal Labor MP Keith Wright alleged that the OAM was a Neo-Nazi organisation associated with the far-right Australian League of Rights. In 1990 he called for a parliamentary inquiry into neo-Nazi groups in Australia to include the OAM and the League of Rights.

== See also ==
- Christian politics in Australia
