= List of mayors of Belmont =

The City of Belmont in Perth, Western Australia, was originally established on 2 December 1898 as a road board with a chairman and councillors under the District Roads Act 1871. It was renamed "Belmont Park Road District" on 4 October 1907. With the passage of the Local Government Act 1960, all road districts became Shires, with a president and councillors, effective 1 July 1961. On 17 February 1979, the Shire of Belmont became a City, with a mayor and councillors. Since 2023, the mayor of the City of Belmont has been popularly elected. Before that, the mayor was elected by the councillors.

== Belmont Park Road District ==
Chairman	Term
John Handron-Smith	1899–1900
H. G. Duncan	1900–1906
R. C. Plant	1906–1908
E. J. Hayes	1908–1909
J. O. Fisher	1909–1910
H. G. Duncan	1910–1911
Albert Ernest Rowe	1911-1912
J. O. Fisher	1912–1916
E. C. Standing	1916
P. D. Mulligan	1916–1917
J. J. Austin	1917–1918
Thomas Lawrence Garvey	1918–1919
Albert Ernest Rowe	1919–1921
M. S. Wake	1921–1923
Donald McLachlan	1923–1927
Albert Ernest Rowe	1927–1929
F. Piercey	1929–1930
Albert Ernest Rowe	1930–1938
Donald McLachlan	1938–1942
W. A. Walsh	1942–1943
Albert Ernest Rowe	1943–1944
Clive M. Forster	1944–1946
Francis David Wilson	1946–1951
Robert Henry Selby	1951–1955
Francis David Wilson	c. 1956–1957
Robert Henry Selby	1957–1958
Patrick John Faulkner	1958–1960
Ronald F. W. Cracknell	1960–1961
Patrick John Faulkner	1961

== Shire of Belmont ==
President	Term
Patrick John Faulkner	1961–1962
Bart A. M. Clayden	1962–1964
J. G. Sissons	1964–1966
Ronald F. W. Cracknell	1966–1967
Francis David Wilson	1967–1968
Edwin Jack Miles	1968–1969
Reginald E. Ellery	1969–1971
Bart A. M. Clayden	1971–1973
Harold J. Wheatley	1973–1975
Thomas H. Henderson	1975–1977
Fred W. Rae	1977–1979

== City of Belmont ==
Mayor	Term
Fred Rae	1979–1987
Peggy P. Parkin	1987–1994
Peter R. Passeri	1994–2005
Glenys Godfrey	2005–2011
Phil Marks	2011–2023
Robert Rossi	2023–present
