= Aboriginal Evangelical Fellowship =

Religious organisation in Australia

The Aboriginal Evangelical Fellowship of Australia (AEF) is an Indigenous Australian Christian organisation that was formed in January 1970, in Port Augusta, South Australia.

There are a number of churches, in New South Wales and Western Australia, with two bible colleges: AEF Bimbadeen College on the site of the Cootamundra Domestic Training Home for Aboriginal Girls at Cootamundra, New South Wales and Aboriginal Evangelical Fellowship Bible College of WA at Forrestdale, Western Australia.

The current President of the Aboriginal Evangelical Fellowship is the Rev. Neville Naden.

== See also ==
- One Australia Movement
