= Dave Kelly (politician) =

Australian politician

The Honourable Dave Kelly MLA
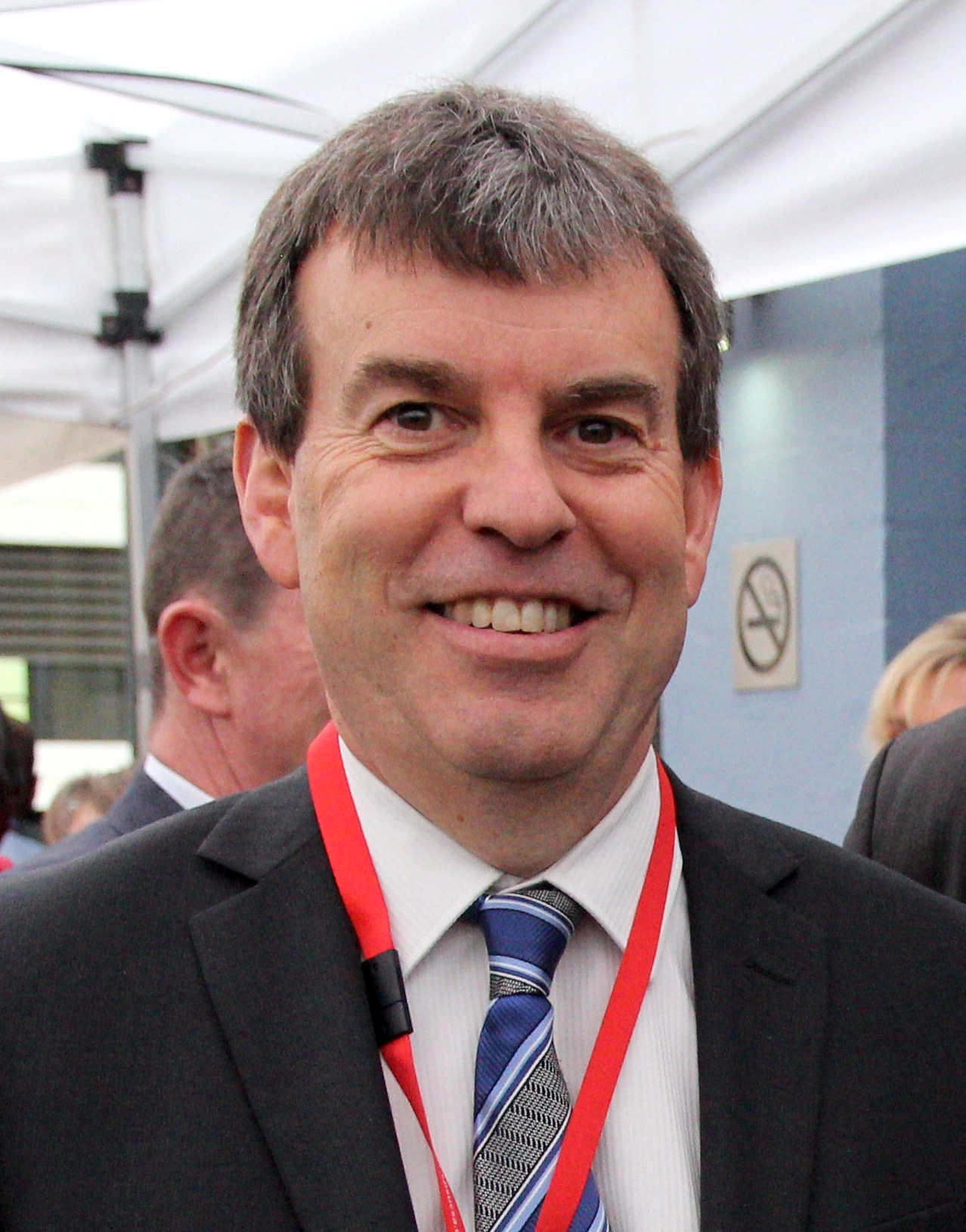

Member of the Legislative Assembly of Western Australia
- Incumbent
- Assumed office 9 March 2013
- Preceded by: Martin Whitely
- Constituency: Bassendean

Personal details
- Born: David Joseph Kelly; 1 July 1962 (age 64) East Fremantle, Western Australia
- Party: Labor
- Education: University of Western Australia

David Joseph Kelly (born 1 July 1962) is an Australian politician who has been a member of the Legislative Assembly of Western Australia since 2013, representing the seat of Bassendean. In the McGowan Ministry, he was Minister for Water, Minister for Fisheries, Minister for Forestry, Minister for Innovation and ICT, and Minister for Science.

== Early life ==
Kelly was born in Perth, and graduated from the University of Western Australia with a Bachelor of Arts degree. Prior to entering politics, he worked for a trade union, United Voice, for 20 years, including as state secretary for 10 years.

== Political career ==
Kelly entered parliament at the 2013 state election, replacing the retiring member, Martin Whitely, in the safe Labor seat of Bassendean. At the time of his election, he was living in the suburb of Bayswater. A month after entering parliament, Kelly was included in the reconstituted shadow ministry led by Mark McGowan. He has been described as a "factional boss" and "left-faction powerbroker".

On 27 February 2022 Kelly became the first Western Australian politician to acknowledge he had tested positive to COVID-19, making the announcement via Twitter.

Kelly was re-elected in the 2025 Western Australian state election.

== Links ==
- Official Website

Parliament of Western Australia
Preceded by Martin Whitely	Member for Bassendean; 2013–present	Incumbent
