= Electoral district of Dale =

Former state electoral district of Western Australia

Dale Western Australia—Legislative Assembly
- State: Western Australia
- Dates current: 1950–1989
- Namesake: Dale River

Dale was an electoral district of the Legislative Assembly in the Australian state of Western Australia from 1950 to 1989.

Dale was a mostly rural district based to the east of Perth. It was a safe seat for the Liberal Party. The district was abolished ahead of the 1989 state election, when its last member Fred Tubby won the new seat of Roleystone.

== Members ==
Member	Party	Term
Gerald Wild	Liberal Country League	1950–1965
Cyril Rushton	Liberal Country League	1965–1968
Cyril Rushton	Liberal	1968–1988
Fred Tubby	Liberal	1988–1989
