= Glenys Godfrey =

Australian politician (born 1949)

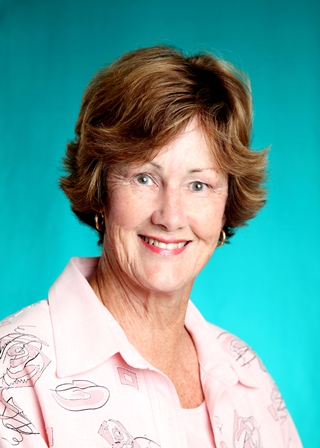

Member of the Western Australian Legislative Assembly for Belmont
- In office 9 March 2013 – 11 March 2017
- Preceded by: Eric Ripper
- Succeeded by: Cassie Rowe

Personal details
- Born: Glenys Jenolan Ward; 19 July 1949 (age 76) Perth, Western Australia
- Party: Liberal

Glenys Jenolan Godfrey (née Ward; born 19 July 1949) is a former Australian politician who was a Liberal Party member of the Legislative Assembly of Western Australia from 2013 to 2017, representing the seat of Belmont.

Godfrey was born in Perth, and attended Kent Street Senior High School. Godfrey is a Fellow of the Institute of Public Accountants, and has worked as a company director. She was elected to the Belmont City Council in 1997, and in 2005 was elected mayor. Godfrey first stood for parliament at the 2001 state election, losing to Labor's Eric Ripper (the party's deputy leader) in Belmont with 35.3 percent of the two-party-preferred vote. She reprised her candidacy at the 2005 election, narrowing the margin, and finally won the seat on her third attempt in 2013. She defeated the new Labor candidate, Cassie Rowe in the strong Labor seat by 330 votes on the two-party-preferred count. She faced Rowe again at the 2017 election but with the unpopular Barnett government in power she was this time defeated.

== See also ==
- List of mayors of Belmont

Western Australian Legislative Assembly
Preceded by Eric Ripper	Member for Belmont; 2013–2017	Succeeded by Cassie Rowe
