= Electoral district of Bassendean =

State electoral district in Perth, Western Australia

Bassendean Western Australia—Legislative Assembly
- Interactive map of electoral district boundaries from the 2025 state election
- State: Western Australia
- Dates current: 1996–present
- MP: Dave Kelly
- Party: Labor
- Namesake: Bassendean
- Electors: 32,644 (2025)
- Area: 26 km^{2} (10.0 sq mi)
- Demographic: Metropolitan
- Coordinates: 31.88°S 115.93°E
Electorates around Bassendean:
| | West Swan |
| Morley | Bassendean | Midland |
| Maylands | | Belmont |

Bassendean is an electoral district of the Legislative Assembly in the Australian state of Western Australia.

The district is based in the eastern suburbs of Perth. It is a safe Labor seat.

== Geography ==
Bassendean is a compact electorate situated east of the Perth CBD. The district is bordered to the south by Swan River, to the east by the Tonkin Highway and Beechboro Road North, to the north by the Reid Highway and to the west by Lord Street. It includes the suburbs of Bassendean, Ashfield, Eden Hill, Kiara, Lockridge, as well as parts of Beechboro, Bayswater, Bennett Springs, Caversham, Embleton and Morley.

== History ==
Bassendean was first contested at the 1996 state election. The seat was won by Labor candidate Clive Brown, previously the member for Morley, which had been abolished. Brown was succeeded at the 2005 state election by Martin Whitely, previously member for the abolished Roleystone. Whitely retired at the 2013 election and was succeeded by union official Dave Kelly.

== Members for Bassendean ==
| Member | Party | Term |
|---|---|---|
| Clive Brown | Labor | 1996–2005 |
| Martin Whitely | Labor | 2005–2013 |
| Dave Kelly | Labor | 2013–present |

== Election results ==
2025 Western Australian state election: Bassendean
| Party | Candidate | Votes | % | ±% |
|---|---|---|---|---|
| Labor | Dave Kelly | 13,961 | 52.3 | −19.0 |
| Liberal | Ash Kumar | 4,220 | 15.8 | +3.7 |
| Independent | Renée McLennan | 3,083 | 11.5 | +11.5 |
| Greens | Callan Gray | 2,854 | 10.7 | +2.9 |
| One Nation | Chris Fenech | 1,301 | 4.9 | +2.9 |
| Christians | David Kingston | 1,300 | 4.9 | +1.9 |
| Total formal votes | | 26,719 | 95.1 | −0.3 |
| Informal votes | | 1,388 | 4.9 | +0.3 |
| Turnout | | 28,107 | 86.1 | +3.0 |
Notional two-party-preferred count (Note: Estimated two-party-preferred count by Antony Green.)
| Labor | Dave Kelly | 19,882 | 74.5 | −7.2 |
| Liberal | Ash Kumar | 6,820 | 25.5 | +7.2 |
Two-candidate-preferred result
| Labor | Dave Kelly | 17,532 | 65.7 | −16.0 |
| Independent | Renée McLennan | 9,163 | 34.3 | +34.3 |
| Labor hold | | | | |
