= 1989 Western Australian state election =

- 4 February 1989

All 57 seats in the Western Australian Legislative Assembly and all 34 seats to the Western Australian Legislative Council 29 Assembly seats were needed for a majority
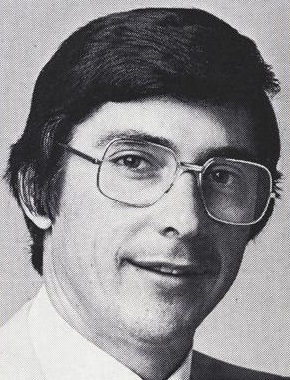

	First party	Second party	Third party
Leader	Peter Dowding	Barry MacKinnon	Hendy Cowan
Party	Labor	Liberal	National
Leader since	25 February 1988	25 November 1986	1979
Leader's seat	Maylands	Jandakot	Merredin
Last election	32 seats	19 seats	6 seats
Seats won	31	20	6
Seat change	▼1	▲1	Steady
Popular vote	341,931	344,524	37,075
Percentage	42.46%	42.79%	4.60%
Swing	▼10.54	▲1.47	▲0.89
TPP	47.62%	52.38%
TPP swing	▼6.50	▲6.50
Premier before election
Peter Dowding
Labor
Elected Premier
Peter Dowding
Labor

Elections were held in the state of Western Australia on 4 February 1989 to elect all 57 members to the Legislative Assembly and all 34 members to the Legislative Council. The Labor government, led by Premier Peter Dowding, won a third term in office against the Liberal Party, led by Opposition Leader Barry MacKinnon.

The result was a major swing against the Labor Party, coming in the wake of revelations of dealings between Government and business that came to be known as WA Inc. The redistribution that took place in 1988, based upon the Acts Amendment (Electoral Reform) Act 1987 which abolished several country and outer metropolitan electorates while creating new metropolitan ones, makes it difficult to assess how Labor would have performed on the old boundaries—while it lost four seats, it gained one Liberal-held seat and won several of the new seats, so in net terms, it only lost one seat despite the massive swing and the low two-party-preferred result.

This was the first election in WA contested by the WA Green Party- a forerunner to the Australian Greens Party.

== Results ==
=== Legislative Assembly ===
Western Australian state election, 4 February 1989 Legislative Assembly << 1986–1993 >>
Enrolled voters	957,939				
Votes cast	869,100		Turnout	90.73%	–0.71%
Informal votes	63,870		Informal	7.35%	+4.72%
Summary of votes by party
Party	Primary votes	%	Swing	Seats	Change
Labor	341,931	42.46%	–10.54%	31	– 1
Liberal	344,524	42.79%	+1.47%	20	+ 1
National	37,075	4.60%	+0.89%	6	± 0
Grey Power	41,525	5.16%	+5.16%	0	± 0
Democrats	11,509	1.43%	+0.77%	0	± 0
Greens	4,246	0.53%	+0.53%	0	± 0
Other parties	1,042	0.13%	–0.20%	0	± 0
Independent	23,378	2.90%	+1.92%	0	± 0
Total	805,230			57	
Two-party-preferred
Labor	383,422	47.62%	–6.50%		
Liberal	421,808	52.38%	+6.50%		

=== Legislative Council ===
Western Australian state election, 4 February 1989 Legislative Council
Enrolled voters	957,939				
Votes cast	870,996		Turnout	90.92%	–0.50%
Informal votes	24,061		Informal	2.76%	–0.53%
Summary of votes by party
Party	Primary votes	%	Swing	Seats	Change
Labor	347,675	41.05%	–4.08%	16	+ 1
Liberal	350,053	41.33%	–0.64%	15	± 0
National	42,328	5.00%	+0.24%	3	– 1
Grey Power	34,055	4.02%	+4.02%	0	± 0
Democrats	28,113	3.32%	–4.81%	0	± 0
Greens	27,013	3.19%	+3.19%	0	± 0
One Australia Movement	7,391	0.87%	+0.87%	0	± 0
Independent	10,307	1.22%	+1.21%	0	± 0
Total	846,935			34	

== Seats changing parties ==
Seat	Pre-1989			Swing	Post-1989		
Seat	Party	Member	Margin	Swing	Margin	Member	Party
Collie	Labor	Tom Jones	4.2*	7.1	2.9**	Hilda Turnbull	National
Kingsley	Labor	notional	N/A	N/A	7.6	Cheryl Edwardes	Liberal
Mandurah	Labor	John Read	9.4	10.5	1.1	Roger Nicholls	Liberal
Melville	Labor	Barry Hodge	19.5	19.6	0.1	Doug Shave	Liberal
Murray	Liberal	notional	N/A	N/A	0.9	Keith Read	Labor
Riverton	Labor	notional	N/A	N/A	4.5	Graham Kierath	Liberal
Roe	Liberal	notional	N/A	N/A	1.0***	Ross Ainsworth	National
Roleystone	Labor	notional	N/A	N/A	1.7	Fred Tubby	Liberal
Scarborough	Labor	Graham Burkett	10.3	11.9	1.6	George Strickland	Liberal
Warren	Labor	David Evans	–1.0	9.8	10.8	Paul Omodei	Liberal

- A redistribution prior to the election had made the Labor-held seat of Warren notionally Liberal
- Members listed in italics did not contest their seat at this election.
- * figure is vs. National
- ** figure is vs. Labor
- *** figure is vs. Liberal

== Post-election pendulum ==
Labor seats (31)
Marginal
Geraldton	Jeff Carr	ALP	0.2%
Northern Rivers	Kevin Leahy	ALP	0.6%
Murray	Keith Read	ALP	0.9%
Dianella	Keith Wilson	ALP	1.1%
Perth	Ian Alexander	ALP	1.2%
Bunbury	Phil Smith	ALP	1.5%
Swan Hills	Gavan Troy	ALP	1.5%
Wanneroo	Jackie Watkins	ALP	1.6%
Whitford	Pam Beggs	ALP	1.7%
Helena	Gordon Hill	ALP	2.6%
Armadale	Bob Pearce	ALP	3.1%
Nollamara	John Kobelke	ALP	3.7%
Balcatta	Nick Catania	ALP	4.0%
Rockingham	Mike Barnett	ALP	4.1%
Glendalough	Carmen Lawrence	ALP	4.8%
Fairly safe
Kenwick	Judyth Watson	ALP	6.9%
Mitchell	David Smith	ALP	7.4%
Thornlie	Yvonne Henderson	ALP	7.4%
Victoria Park	Geoff Gallop	ALP	7.4%
Ashburton	Pam Buchanan	ALP	7.9%
Peel	Norm Marlborough	ALP	9.4%
Safe
Maylands	Peter Dowding	ALP	10.1%
Belmont	Eric Ripper	ALP	10.5%
Eyre	Julian Grill	ALP	11.2%
Kalgoorlie	Ian Taylor	ALP	11.4%
Pilbara	Larry Graham	ALP	11.5%
Fremantle	David Parker	ALP	12.4%
Marangaroo	Ted Cunningham	ALP	12.4%
Morley	Frank Donovan	ALP	12.4%
Cockburn	Bill Thomas	ALP	14.6%
Kimberley	Ernie Bridge	ALP	19.6%

Liberal/National seats (26)
Marginal
Melville	Doug Shave	LIB	0.1%
Roe	Ross Ainsworth	NAT	1.0% v LIB
Mandurah	Roger Nicholls	LIB	1.1%
Scarborough	George Strickland	LIB	1.6%
Roleystone	Fred Tubby	LIB	1.7%
Moore	Bill McNee	LIB	2.5% v NAT
Collie	Hilda Turnbull	NAT	2.9%
Riverton	Graham Kierath	LIB	4.5%
Fairly safe
Kingsley	Cheryl Edwardes	LIB	7.6%
Safe
Albany	Leon Watt	LIB	10.1%
Warren	Paul Omodei	LIB	10.8%
South Perth	Bill Grayden	LIB	11.3%
Marmion	Jim Clarko	LIB	14.3%
Jandakot	Barry MacKinnon	LIB	14.6%
Stirling	Monty House	NAT	15.1% v LIB
Avon	Max Trenorden	NAT	16.0%
Cottesloe	Bill Hassell	LIB	16.8%
Nedlands	Richard Court	LIB	17.3%
Wellington	John Bradshaw	LIB	17.5%
Darling Range	Ian Thompson	LIB	17.7%
Wagin	Bob Wiese	NAT	18.1% v LIB
Vasse	Barry Blaikie	LIB	18.7%
Applecross	Richard Lewis	LIB	19.1%
Floreat	Andrew Mensaros	LIB	20.3%
Greenough	Kevin Minson	LIB	21.3%
Merredin	Hendy Cowan	NAT	31.2%

== See also ==
- Candidates of the 1989 Western Australian state election
- Members of the Western Australian Legislative Assembly, 1986–1989
- Members of the Western Australian Legislative Assembly, 1989–1993
