= Martin Whitely =

Australian politician

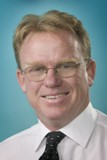

Member of the Western Australian Legislative Assembly for Roleystone
- In office 10 February 2001 – 25 February 2005
- Preceded by: Fred Tubby
- Succeeded by: Seat abolished

Member of the Western Australian Legislative Assembly for Bassendean
- In office 26 February 2005 – 9 March 2013
- Preceded by: Clive Brown
- Succeeded by: Dave Kelly

Personal details
- Born: 19 October 1959 (age 67) Perth Western Australia
- Party: Labor Party
- Profession: Teacher

Martin Paul Whitely (born 19 October 1959) is a mental health researcher, author and was a Labor member of the Western Australian Legislative Assembly from February 2001 until he retired from state politics in March 2013. During his parliamentary and academic research career Whitely has been a prominent critic of increasing child mental health medication prescribing rates.

== Research ==
Whilst still in politics Whitely wrote Speed Up and Sit Still - The Controversies of ADHD Diagnosis and Treatment (UWA Publishing 2010). Since retiring from politics he completed a PhD (thesis title ADHD Policy, Practice and Regulatory Capture in Australia 1992–2012). Subsequently, he has researched Australian mental health policy and practice and pharmaceutical and medical device regulation. His research has primarily focused on the drivers and outcomes of prescription mental health medication use by children, adolescents and young adults for ADHD and depression.

=== ADHD research ===
Whitely led two research projects examining the effect of relative-age within a school classroom on the probability of school-children being medicated for ADHD.

The first, Influence of birth month of Western Australian children on the probability of being treated for ADHD, was published in the Medical Journal of Australia in 2017. It found that among West Australian school children aged 6–10 the youngest in class (born in June) were approximately twice as likely to take ADHD medication as their oldest classmates (born the previous July).

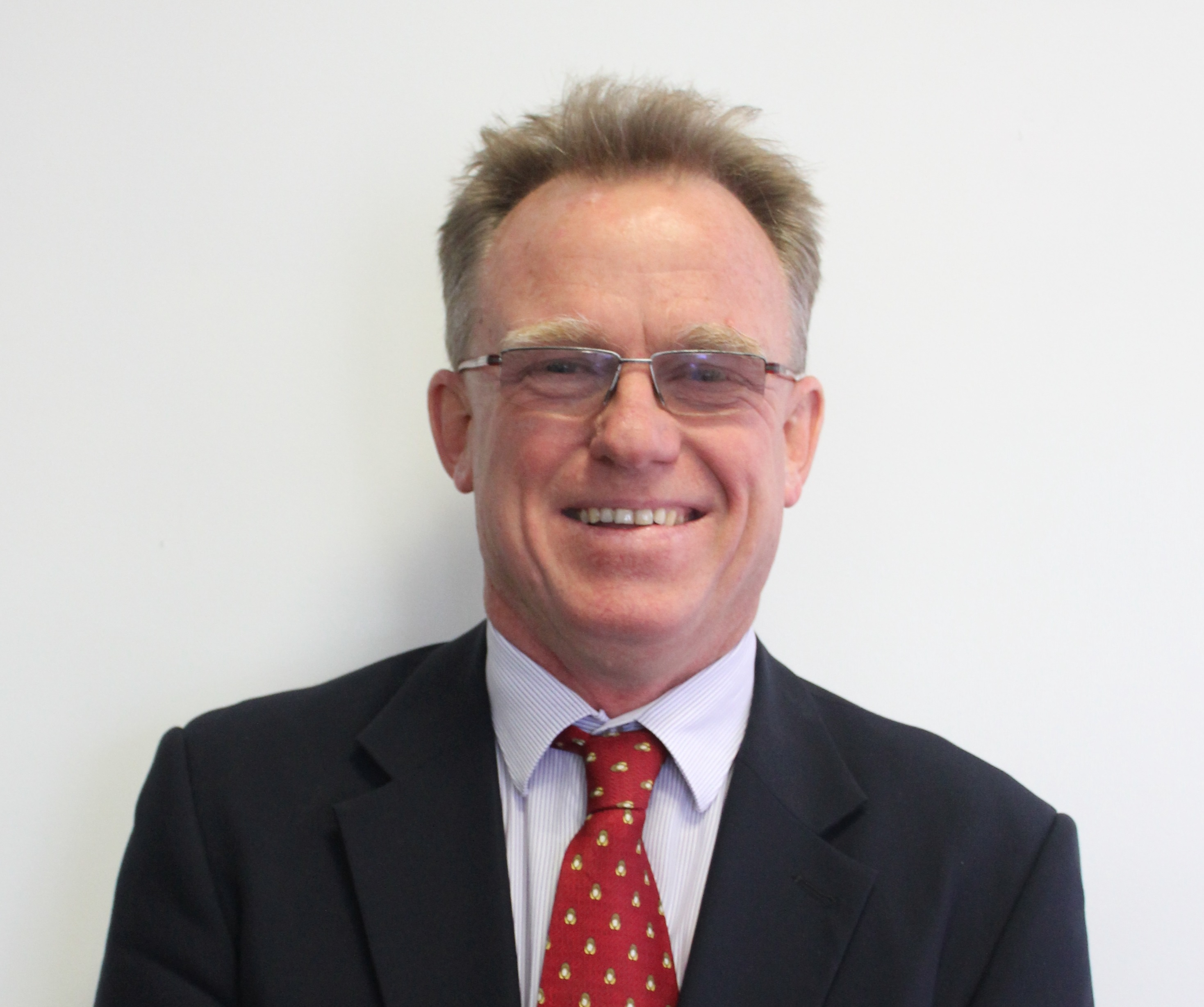
Dr Martin Whitely in 2020

The second, Attention deficit hyperactivity disorder late birthdate effect common in both high and low prescribing international jurisdictions: a systematic review, published in 2019 examined 22 studies in 13 countries covering 15.4 million children. It found that is the global norm for the youngest students within a school year grade to be diagnosed with and medicated for ADHD than there older classmates.

Whitely also co-authored a paper published in 2020, Look west for Australian evidence of the relationship between amphetamine‐type stimulant prescribing and meth/amphetamine use. It reviewed Western Australian (WA) evidence of the relationship between prescribing amphetamine type stimulants for ADHD and the illicit use of amphetamines. It found that the non-medical use of prescription ATS by WA secondary school students is the major component of their illicit amphetamine use. It also reported that since at least 2002 WA adults have been prescribed ATS at a much higher rate than other Australian adults and WA adult illicit amphetamine use rates have consistently been among the highest in Australia.

=== Research examining antidepressant use and suicide by young Australians ===
Whitely led research published in 2020, Antidepressant Prescribing and Suicide/Self-Harm by Young Australians: Regulatory Warnings, Contradictory Advice, and Long-Term Trends. It examined the Australian response to the US Food and Drug Administration's (FDA) 2004 black box warnings that antidepressant use was associated with an elevated risk of suicidal thinking and behaviours in people aged under 25.This research found that in the four years following the 2004 FDA warning there was a 31% decrease in antidepressant prescribing and a small fall in the rate of suicide by young Australians. However, from 2009 to 2018 the rates of antidepressant use and suicide by young Australians increased consistently. In 2009 there were 275 suicides by Australians aged under 25 years, in 2018 this number rose to 458.

Whitely, and his co-authors Prof Jon Juriedini and Dr Melissa Raven, concluded “correlation does not prove causation. However, given that the FDA warned that antidepressants were associated with an approximately doubled risk of suicidality relative to placebo, we are not surprised that rising dispensing rates have been accompanied by increasing youth suicide rates”.

== Parliamentary career ==
Whitely represented the electorate of Roleystone from 2001 to 2005. Following the abolition of Roleystone, he represented the electorate of Bassendean and was the Parliamentary Secretary to the Minister for Agriculture, Food and Forestry from August 2006 until the Carpenter government lost office in September 2008.

=== Anti-ADHD child medication parliamentary advocacy ===
From 1995 until his election to parliament in 2001, Whitely was a secondary school teacher. During this period Western Australian ADHD child prescribing rates rose rapidly. By 2000 they were among the highest in the world and over twice the per-capita rate in of the second highest Australian state (New South Wales).

In his first parliamentary speech (2001) he called for tighter ADHD prescribing controls. In late December 2002 the Western Australian Health Minister Bob Kucera and Whitely jointly announced the abolition of “en bloc authorisation” which allowed “specialists to prescribe stimulants without individual patient authorisation”. In August 2003 the Stimulant Regulatory Scheme began collecting detailed annual reporting of ADHD stimulant in Western Australia. Data from the Stimulant Regulatory Scheme shows after these changes the number of Western Australian children prescribing stimulants fell from 8,859 in 2004 to 5,636 in 2010, despite the state's population increasing by approximately 17%. This approximates to a 46% decrease in per capita ADHD stimulant child prescribing rates over this period.

Beginning in 2011 there was a rebound in child prescribing rates. By 2017, the number of Western Australian children who received at least one prescription of an ADHD stimulant had jumped to 9,587. From 2010 until 2017 the number of children medicated increased by 70% while the state's population increased by only 15%.

Whitely also campaigned to influence national (Australian) ADHD policy. He unsuccessfully sought to prevent non-stimulant ADHD medication Strattera (Atomoxetine Hydrochloride) from being added to the Pharmaceutical Benefits Scheme because of its boxed warning for increased risk of suicidality. Strattera was added to the PBS in 2007. Until 17 February 2018 the Therapeutic Goods Administration (TGA) had received 149 reports of adverse events. This included 78 reports of suicidal/homicidal/self-harm ideation or behaviour, with four incomplete suicide attempts (including a 7-year-old girl) and three completed suicides (including a nine-year-old boy). Because adverse event reporting to the TGA by doctors is voluntary the actual number of adverse events associated with Strattera (or any medication) in Australia is unknown.

He also campaigned to prevent the endorsement by the National Health and Medical Research Council (NHMRC) ADHD national treatment guidelines developed by the Royal Australian College of Physicians (RACP). The guidelines were never endorsed by the NHMRC because of concerns about conflicts of interest among guidelines panel members and the heavy reliance on research led by high-profile ADHD medication proponents with undisclosed significant conflicts of interest, most notably Professor Joseph Biederman.

Whitely's self-described “at times obsessive” campaign against the use of ADHD medications by children has attracted criticism from prominent Australian psychiatrists Professors Florence Levy and Alasdair Vance. However, Whitely has received praise for offering a "proven public health cure...for the false epidemic of ADHD" from prominent American psychiatrist Professor Allen Frances who led the development of the DSMIV on behalf of the American Psychiatric Association.

=== Criticism of the diagnosis of Psychosis Risk Disorder ===
Whitely was also prominent in Australian efforts to prevent the official recognition of ‘Psychosis Risk Disorder’ in the influential American Psychiatric Association's, Diagnostic and Statistical Manual of Mental Disorders, Fifth Edition (DSM-5) published in 2013. Psychosis Risk Disorder (officially termed Attenuated Psychosis Syndrome) was removed from the draft of the DSM-5 after its inclusion lost the support of former prominent advocates including former Australian of the Year, psychiatrist Professor Patrick McGorry.

Western Australian Legislative Assembly
Preceded by Fred Tubby	Member for Roleystone; 2001–2005	Abolished
Preceded by Clive Brown	Member for Bassendean; 2005–2013	Succeeded by Dave Kelly
