= Electoral district of Belmont =

State electoral district of Western Australia

Belmont Western Australia—Legislative Assembly
- Interactive map of electoral district boundaries from the 2025 state election
- State: Western Australia
- Dates current: 1962–1974; 1989–present
- MP: Cassie Rowe
- Party: Labor
- Namesake: Belmont
- Electors: 31,049 (2025)
- Area: 66 km^{2} (25.5 sq mi)
- Demographic: Metropolitan
- Coordinates: 31.94°S 115.95°E
Electorates around Belmont:
Maylands	Bassendean	Midland
Victoria Park	Belmont	Forrestfield
Victoria Park	Cannington	Forrestfield

Belmont is an electoral district of the Legislative Assembly in the Australian state of Western Australia. Belmont is named for the inner eastern Perth suburb of Belmont, which falls within its borders.

The seat was in its present incarnation considered a safe Labor seat prior to 2013, and was held by former Labor leader Eric Ripper; however, it fell to Liberal Glenys Godfrey in the Liberal landslide at the 2013 state election. Belmont reverted to its status as a safe Labor seat when Cassie Rowe won it at the 2017 state election.

== History ==
Belmont was initially within the vast electorate of Canning. In 1911, 50 people voted at the Belmont and Welshpool Road booths, and by 1950, this had grown to 410 at Belmont, 685 at Welshpool and 692 at Queens Park. However, the area grew rapidly following the Second World War as industry developed at Belmont, Kewdale and Forrestfield, and Housing Commission areas were built to support them. At the 1955 redistribution, the new electorate of Beeloo was created—the only district to be so created. The previous member for Canning, Labor member Colin Jamieson who was first elected in 1953, secured the seat at the 1956 election.

At the 1962 election, Beeloo moved further south into Cannington and Queens Park, whilst a new seat of Belmont was created with boundaries not dissimilar to the present seat. It was represented by former Speaker James Hegney until 1968.

At the redistribution taking effect from the 1968 election, Beeloo was abolished, and a new seat of Ascot was created north and south of the Swan River. Belmont shifted southwards and was won by Jamieson at the election. When the electorate lost the suburb of Belmont to Ascot in the distribution prior to the 1974 election, the electorate was renamed Welshpool. Ascot, initially represented by Merv Toms until his death while presiding as Speaker on 8 October 1971, was then won by schoolteacher Mal Bryce who went on to become Deputy Premier to Brian Burke from 1983 to 1988. At the by-election held to replace him on 17 February 1988, schoolteacher and union organiser Eric Ripper was successful.

At the 1988 redistribution, both Welshpool and Ascot were abolished, and Belmont was recreated, with Ripper transferring into the seat. Ripper served as Deputy Premier to both Dr Geoff Gallop and Alan Carpenter before becoming Opposition Leader after Labor's unexpected defeat at the 2013 election. Ripper retired in 2017, and Liberal Glenys Godfrey, a former City of Belmont councillor, won the seat on her third attempt. However, Godfrey herself was swept out by her Labor opponent from four year's earlier, Cassie Rowe, amid that year's massive Labor landslide. Rowe actually picked up a swing large enough to revert Belmont to its traditional status as a safe Labor seat.

== Geography ==
Belmont is bounded by the Swan River to the northwest, the Helena River to the north, the freight railway to the east, Welshpool Road to the south and Orrong Road to the southwest. Its boundaries include the suburbs of Ascot, Belmont, Cloverdale, Kewdale, Redcliffe, Rivervale, South Guildford and Welshpool, as well as Perth Airport, and parts of Burswood and Hazelmere.

The 2007 redistribution, which took effect at the 2008 election, only removed a section of High Wycombe which had been added in 2005.

== Members for Belmont ==
First incarnation (1962–1974)
Member	Party	Term
James Hegney	Labor	1962–1968
Colin Jamieson	Labor	1968–1974
Second incarnation (1989–present)
Eric Ripper	Labor	1989–2013
Glenys Godfrey	Liberal	2013–2017
Cassie Rowe	Labor	2017–present

== Election results ==
2025 Western Australian state election: Belmont
Party	Candidate	Votes	%	±%
Labor	Cassie Rowe	12,807	53.6	−17.2
Liberal	Biju Anthony	5,492	23.0	+7.2
Greens	Helen Olivieri	3,656	15.3	+8.5
One Nation	Liviu Filip Tomules	1,237	5.2	+3.3
Christians	Nathanael Yap	718	3.0	+0.6
Total formal votes		23,910	94.8	−1.1
Informal votes		1,310	5.2	+1.1
Turnout		25,220	81.2	+2.5
Two-party-preferred result
Labor	Cassie Rowe	16,577	69.4	−10.1
Liberal	Biju Anthony	7,326	30.6	+10.1
Labor hold		Swing	−10.1	
