= Keith Read =

Australian politician

Keith John Read (born 4 May 1961) is a former Australian politician. He was the Labor member for Murray in the Western Australian Legislative Assembly from 1989 to 1993.
