= Electoral district of Marmion =

Former state electoral district of Western Australia

Marmion Western Australia—Legislative Assembly
- State: Western Australia
- Dates current: 1989–1996
- Namesake: Marmion

Marmion was an electoral district of the Legislative Assembly in the Australian state of Western Australia from 1989 to 1996.

The district was based in Perth's beachside northern suburbs. Politically, it was a safe Liberal seat.

== History ==
Marmion was first created for the 1989 state election. It was won by Liberal candidate Jim Clarko, who was until then the member for Karrinyup, which had been abolished.

Marmion itself was abolished ahead of the 1996 state election, largely replaced by the new seat of Carine.

== Members for Marmion ==
Member	Party	Term
Jim Clarko	Liberal	1989–1996
