= Eric Ripper =

Australian politician

The Honourable Eric Ripper AM
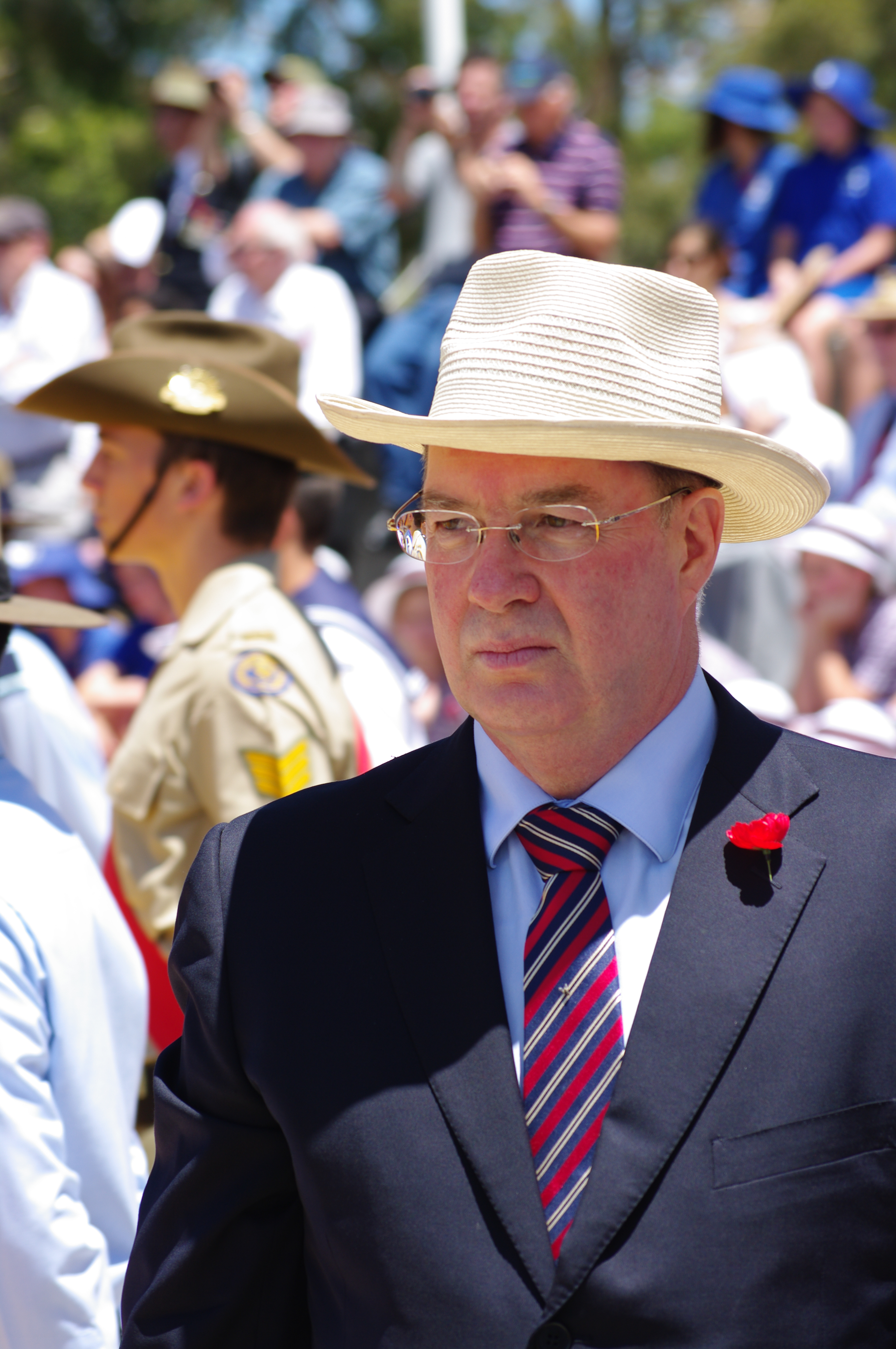

Leader of the Opposition in Western Australia
- In office 23 September 2008 – 23 January 2012
- Premier: Colin Barnett
- Deputy: Roger Cook
- Preceded by: Colin Barnett
- Succeeded by: Mark McGowan

Leader of the Western Australian Labor Party
- In office 16 September 2008 – 23 January 2012
- Preceded by: Alan Carpenter
- Succeeded by: Mark McGowan

Member of the Western Australian Parliament for Belmont
- In office 4 February 1989 – 9 March 2013
- Preceded by: Constituency re-established
- Succeeded by: Glenys Godfrey

Member of the Western Australian Parliament for Ascot
- In office 19 March 1988 – 4 February 1989
- Preceded by: Mal Bryce
- Succeeded by: Constituency abolished

Personal details
- Born: Eric Stephen Ripper; 13 September 1951 (age 75) Subiaco, Western Australia
- Party: Labor Party
- Spouse: Patricia Y. Pearce (m. 1982, divorced)
- Domestic partner: Ljiljanna Ravlich
- Children: 2 sons
- Relatives: Bob Pearce MP (ex brother-in-law)
- Education: University of Western Australia
- Profession: Teacher

Eric Stephen Ripper AM (born 13 September 1951) is an Australian former politician. From 2008 to 2012 he was Leader of the Opposition and leader of the Labor Party in Western Australia.

He grew up on a wheat/sheep farm near Nyabing. Ripper later attended Churchlands Senior High School and the University of Western Australia, from which he received a Bachelor of Arts and a Diploma of Education. Before entering politics, Ripper had a career as a teacher.

== Career ==
Ripper entered the Parliament of Western Australia in 1988, after winning a by-election in the Electoral district of Ascot. That seat was abolished for the general election held a year later, and he followed most of his constituents into the recreated seat of Belmont. He served as Minister for Community Services and Minister for Disability Services in the Lawrence Ministry (1991–1993).

Labor was defeated in the 1993 election, and Ripper served as an opposition frontbencher for eight years. By 1997, he had become Deputy Leader of the state Labor Party, and hence Deputy Leader of the Opposition, under Geoff Gallop. Labor regained government in 2001, and Ripper was named Deputy Premier of Western Australia. At various times during Gallop's tenure, he served as Treasurer, Minister for Government Enterprises, Minister for Energy and Minister Assisting the Minister for Public Sector Management in the Gallop government. When Gallop announced his retirement from politics in 2006 whilst off-duty as Premier, Ripper briefly served as acting premier until Gallop's official resignation as Premier when Alan Carpenter was elected as state Labor leader and premier. Under Carpenter, Ripper served as Deputy Premier and Treasurer.

Ripper succeeded Carpenter as WA leader of the ALP on 23 September 2008. In January 2011, Labor MP Ben Wyatt intended to challenge Ripper for the Labor leadership, but withdrew after finding minority support amongst caucus.

On 17 January 2012, Ripper announced that he would stand down as Opposition Leader at a caucus meeting on 23 January, and retire from parliament at the 2013 state election. Mark McGowan, who had been managing opposition business in the House, was elected unopposed as his successor. Ripper thus became only the fourth WA Labor leader not to take the party into an election.

Ripper retired at the 2013 state election and his seat was won by Glenys Godfrey of the Liberal Party, the former Mayor of Belmont.

== Personal life ==
Ripper lives in Rivervale and has two sons. His ex-brother-in-law is Bob Pearce MP (1977-1993). His partner is former Education Minister Ljiljanna Ravlich.

Political offices
Preceded by Hendy Cowan	Deputy Premier of Western Australia; 2001–2008	Succeeded by Kim Hames
Preceded by Colin Barnett	Leader of the Opposition in Western Australia; 2008–2012	Succeeded by Mark McGowan
Party political offices
Preceded by Alan Carpenter	Leader of the Labor Party in Western Australia; 2008–2012	Succeeded by Mark McGowan
Western Australian Legislative Assembly
Preceded by Mal Bryce	Member of Parliament for Ascot; 1988–1989	Constituency abolished
Preceded by Constituency re-established	Member for Belmont; 1989–2013	Succeeded by Glenys Godfrey
