= Kevin Leahy (politician) =

Australian politician (1949–2020)

Kevin John Leahy (17 January 1949 – 19 June 2020) was an Australian politician. He was a Labor member of the Western Australian Legislative Assembly from 1989 to 1996, representing the seat of Northern Rivers. He briefly returned to politics in 2004, when he was elected to the Western Australian Legislative Council for Mining and Pastoral on a countback following Tom Stephens's resignation. He did not recontest the seat at the 2005 state election.

Western Australian Legislative Assembly
New seat	Member for Northern Rivers; 1989–1996	Abolished
