= Bill Hassell =

Australian politician (born 1943)

The Honourable Bill Hassell AM

Member of the Western Australian Parliament for Cottesloe
- In office 19 February 1977 – 28 June 1990
- Preceded by: Ross Hutchinson
- Succeeded by: Colin Barnett

20th Leader of the Opposition (Western Australia)
- In office 15 February 1984 – 25 November 1986
- Premier: Brian Burke
- Deputy: Barry MacKinnon
- Preceded by: Ray O'Connor
- Succeeded by: Barry MacKinnon

Agent-General for Western Australia
- In office 1994–1996

Personal details
- Born: William Ralph Boucher Hassell; 6 June 1943 (age 83)
- Citizenship: Australian
- Party: Liberal Party
- Education: University of Western Australia
- Profession: Lawyer

William Ralph Boucher Hassell (born 6 June 1943) is an Australian former Liberal Party politician who was Leader of the Opposition in Western Australia during the mid-1980s. He was a member of the Western Australian Legislative Assembly seat of Cottesloe between 1977 and 1990.

== Early life ==
After attending Hale School, Hassell attended the University of Western Australia (UWA), graduating in 1965 with a Bachelor of Laws. He entered legal practice in 1966.

== Political career ==
In 1977 Hassell was elected to the Western Australian Legislative Assembly seat of Cottesloe, representing the Liberal Party.

He was Leader of the Opposition between 1984 and 1986 before being replaced by Barry MacKinnon.

Hassell's subsequent political career saw him serve as deputy mayor on Nedlands Council and in this capacity in November 2019, he stated that “Although I loathe and detest welcomes to the country, I sit through them patiently when we have these ceremonies.” Seven months later in June 2020, Hassell tendered his resignation as deputy mayor, and from the council.

== Political views ==
Hassell is a monarchist and was a convenor for the Australians for Constitutional Monarchy.

Parliament of Western Australia
Preceded by Ross Hutchinson	Member for Cottesloe; 1977–1990	Succeeded by Colin Barnett
Political offices
Preceded by Ray O'Connor	Leader of the Opposition; 1984–1986	Succeeded by Barry MacKinnon
Party political offices
Preceded by Ray O'Connor	Leader of the WA Liberal Party; 1984–1986	Succeeded by Barry MacKinnon
