= Electoral district of Roleystone =

Former state electoral district of Western Australia

Roleystone Western Australia—Legislative Assembly
- State: Western Australia
- Dates current: 1989–2005
- Namesake: Roleystone
- Area: 1,648 km^{2} (636.3 sq mi)

Roleystone was an electoral district of the Legislative Assembly in the Australian state of Western Australia from 1989 to 2005.

The district was based in the outer south-eastern suburbs and hinterland of Perth, including the south-eastern corner of the Metropolitan Region Scheme. At its abolition, the district included all or parts of the following local government councils: City of Armadale, City of Gosnells, City of Kalamunda, City of Rockingham, City of Kwinana, Shire of Serpentine-Jarrahdale.

Roleystone was a marginal seat. It was held by the Liberal Party for most of its history, but was captured by Labor at the 2001 state election with the fall of the Court government.

== History ==
Roleystone was first created for the 1989 state election. It was won by Liberal candidate Fred Tubby who had previously held the seat of Dale.

The district was abolished ahead of the 2005 state election. Its territory was divided between the districts of Armadale, Darling Range, Kenwick and Serpentine-Jarrahdale. Sitting MP Martin Whitely shifted to the north-eastern suburban seat of Bassendean.

== Members for Roleystone ==
Member	Party	Term
Fred Tubby	Liberal	1989–2001
Martin Whitely	Labor	2001–2005
