= Electoral district of Northern Rivers =

Former electoral district in Western Australia

Northern Rivers Western Australia—Legislative Assembly
- State: Western Australia
- Dates current: 1989–1996

Northern Rivers was an electoral district of the Legislative Assembly in the Australian state of Western Australia, existing from 1989 to 1996.

== Members for Northern Rivers ==
Member	Party	Term
Kevin Leahy	Labor	1989–1996
