= Fred Tubby =

Australian politician (born 1947)

Frederick Charles Tubby (born 23 January 1947) is a former Australian politician.

The son of Reg Tubby, also an MP, he was born in Morawa, Western Australia. He was a school principal before entering politics.

In 1988 he was elected in a by-election to the Western Australian Legislative Assembly as the Liberal member for Dale, moving to the new seat of Roleystone the following year. During this period, he was serving alongside his father until 1989. In 1989 he was appointed Shadow Minister for the Family, Seniors and Consumer Affairs, exchanging Education for Family in 1990 and becoming simply Shadow Minister for Education in 1992. In February 1993, he was accused of making derogatory remarks about students with disabilities by the Minister for Education, Kay Hallahan. Following the Liberal victory in the 1993 Western Australian state election, he became a parliamentary secretary, which he remained throughout the two terms of Liberal government. He lost his seat in 2001.

Western Australian Legislative Assembly
Preceded by Cyril Rushton	Member for Dale; 1988–1989	Abolished
New seat	Member for Roleystone; 1989–2001	Succeeded by Martin Whitely
