= Jim Clarko =

Australian politician (1932–2020)

The Honourable Jim Clarko AM

25th Speaker of the Western Australian Legislative Assembly
- In office 17 June 1993 – 14 December 1996
- Preceded by: Mike Barnett
- Succeeded by: George Strickland

Member of the Western Australian Legislative Assembly for Marmion
- In office 4 February 1989 – 14 December 1996
- Preceded by: Constituency created
- Succeeded by: Constituency abolished

Member of the Western Australian Legislative Assembly for Karrinyup
- In office 30 March 1974 – 4 February 1989
- Preceded by: Stan Lapham
- Succeeded by: Constituency abolished

Personal details
- Born: 21 July 1932 Cottesloe, Western Australia
- Died: 7 April 2020 (aged 87) Trigg, Western Australia
- Party: Liberal
- Spouse: Edith Laurel Loudon (m. 1958)
- Children: 3
- Education: University of Western Australia
- Profession: Teacher, politician

James George Clarko AM (21 July 1932 – 7 April 2020) was an Australian politician. He was a Liberal Party member of the Western Australian Legislative Assembly from 1974 to 1996, representing the electorates of Karrinyup (1974–1989) and Marmion (1989–1996).

He was Speaker of the Legislative Assembly from 1993 to 1996, and also served a stint as state Minister for Education in the early 1980s.

He received the Member of the Order of Australia award in June 2006 "for service to the Western Australian Parliament serving in various parliamentary positions, including Speaker of the Legislative Assembly, and to the community of the City of Stirling."

Western Australian Legislative Assembly
Preceded by Stan Lapham	Member for Karrinyup; 1974–1989	Electorate abolished
New seat	Member for Marmion; 1989–1996	Electorate abolished
Preceded by Mike Barnett	Speaker of the Western Australian Legislative Assembly; 1993–1996	Succeeded by George Strickland
