= Electoral results for the district of Pilbara =

Western Australian district election results

This is a list of electoral results for the electoral district of Pilbara (Central Kimberley-Pilbara from 2005-2008) in Western Australian state elections.

== Members for Pilbara ==
Member	Party	Term
Henry Keep	Non-aligned	1894–1897
Walter Kingsmill	Oppositionist	1897–1903
James Isdell	Independent	1903–1906
Henry Underwood	Labor	1906–1917
Henry Underwood	Nationalist	1917–1924
Alfred Lamond	Labor	1924–1933
Frank Welsh	Nationalist	1933–1939
Bill Hegney	Labor	1939–1950
Alec Rodoreda	Labor	1950–1958
Arthur Bickerton	Labor	1958–1974
Brian Sodeman	Liberal	1974–1983
Pam Buchanan	Labor	1983–1989
Larry Graham	Labor	1989–2000
Larry Graham	Independent Labor	2000–2005
Tom Stephens	Labor	2005–2013
Brendon Grylls	Nationals WA	2013–2017
Kevin Michel	Labor	2017–present

== Election results ==
=== Elections in the 2020s ===
2025 Western Australian state election: Pilbara
Party	Candidate	Votes	%	±%
Labor	Kevin Michel	6,582	36.1	−22.1
Liberal	Amanda Kailis	4,382	24.0	+15.7
National	Kieran Dart	2,983	16.4	−4.5
One Nation	Brenton Johannsen	1,594	8.7	+5.8
Greens	Niels Glahn-Bertelsen	1,299	7.1	+3.4
Legalise Cannabis	Georgina Wilkinson	817	4.5	+4.5
Shooters, Fishers, Farmers	Leanne Lockyer	584	3.2	+0.1
Total formal votes		18,241	94.8	−0.5
Informal votes		995	5.2	+0.5
Turnout		19,236	64.7	−4.2
Two-party-preferred result
Labor	Kevin Michel	9,218	50.6	−17.1
Liberal	Amanda Kailis	9,011	49.4	+49.4
Labor hold				

2021 Western Australian state election: Pilbara
Party	Candidate	Votes	%	±%
Labor	Kevin Michel	9,075	61.0	+30.1
National	Scott Bourne	2,715	18.3	−9.1
Liberal	Camilo Blanco	1,241	8.3	−6.9
Greens	Machelle Vaughan-Cartner	504	3.4	−0.7
Shooters, Fishers, Farmers	David Allison-Forrest	453	3.0	−6.5
One Nation	Sandi Crouch	432	2.9	−8.5
No Mandatory Vaccination	Max Elliott	270	1.8	+1.8
Western Australia	Don Hyland	115	0.8	+0.8
WAxit	Navneet Jawanda	68	0.5	0.0
Total formal votes		14,873	95.2	−0.2
Informal votes		748	4.8	+0.2
Turnout		15,621	67.1	−0.8
Two-candidate-preferred result
Labor	Kevin Michel	10,459	70.4	+18.1
National	Scott Bourne	4,408	29.6	−18.1
Labor hold				

=== Elections in the 2010s ===
2017 Western Australian state election: Pilbara
Party	Candidate	Votes	%	±%
Labor	Kevin Michel	4,386	31.0	+1.2
National	Brendon Grylls	3,860	27.3	−11.3
Liberal	Mark Alchin	2,158	15.3	−7.8
One Nation	David Archibald	1,606	11.4	+11.4
Shooters, Fishers, Farmers	Fiona White-Hartig	1,352	9.6	+9.6
Greens	Brent McKenna	584	4.1	−0.9
Flux the System!	Mark Dunn	133	0.9	+0.9
Micro Business	Davyd Hooper	65	0.5	+0.5
Total formal votes		14,144	95.4	+0.4
Informal votes		677	4.6	−0.4
Turnout		14,821	70.0	−4.3
Two-party-preferred result
Labor	Kevin Michel	7,393	52.3	+13.8
National	Brendon Grylls	6,748	47.7	−13.8
Labor gain from National		Swing	+13.8	

2013 Western Australian state election: Pilbara
Party	Candidate	Votes	%	±%
National	Brendon Grylls	4,866	38.6	+15.9
Labor	Kelly Howlett	3,758	29.8	–13.5
Liberal	George Levissianos	2,911	23.1	+3.7
Greens	Julie Matheson	628	5.0	–4.6
Independent	Brent McKenna	267	2.1	+2.1
Christians	Bruce Richards	168	1.3	+1.3
Total formal votes		12,598	95.0	–0.2
Informal votes		663	5.0	+0.2
Turnout		13,261	76.7	
Two-party-preferred result
Liberal	George Levissianos	6,774	53.8	+53.8
Labor	Kelly Howlett	5,823	46.2	–11.0
Two-party-preferred result
National	Brendon Grylls	7,739	61.5	+18.7
Labor	Kelly Howlett	4,850	38.5	–18.7
National gain from Labor		Swing	+18.7	

=== Elections in the 2000s ===
2008 Western Australian state election: Pilbara
Party	Candidate	Votes	%	±%
Labor	Tom Stephens	3,336	44.4	−4.4
National	Alan Cochrane	1,724	22.9	+22.9
Liberal	Rosie Vrancic	1,321	17.6	−14.2
Greens	Kelly Howlett	724	9.6	+0.3
Family First	Joan Foley	412	5.5	+5.5
Total formal votes		7,517	94.8	−0.2
Informal votes		409	5.2	+0.2
Turnout		7,926	69.2	
Two-party-preferred result
Labor	Tom Stephens	4,024	53.6	−6.9
National	Alan Cochrane	3,490	46.4	+46.4
Labor hold		Swing	−6.9	

2005 Western Australian state election: Central Kimberley-Pilbara
Party	Candidate	Votes	%	±%
Labor	Tom Stephens	4,369	50.1	+13.9
Liberal	Trona Young	2,388	27.4	+12.2
Greens	Kelly Howlett	786	9.0	+7.7
Independent	Barry Taylor	738	8.5	+8.5
Independent	Paul Asplin	178	2.0	+2.0
One Nation	Gavin Ness	135	1.5	–5.7
Christian Democrats	Jason Matthews	123	1.4	+1.4
Total formal votes		8,717	95.0	−0.8
Informal votes		458	5.0	+0.8
Turnout		9,174	68.6	
Two-party-preferred result
Labor	Tom Stephens	5,542	63.6	+4.2
Liberal	Trona Young	3,168	36.4	−4.2
Labor gain from Independent		Swing	+4.2	

2001 Western Australian state election: Pilbara
Party	Candidate	Votes	%	±%
Independent	Larry Graham	3,626	54.6	+54.6
Labor	Jackie Ormsby	1,782	26.8	−37.0
Liberal	Mark Liedel	821	12.4	−16.9
One Nation	Gavin Ness	416	6.3	+6.3
Total formal votes		6,645	95.6	+0.2
Informal votes		307	4.4	−0.2
Turnout		6,952	68.4	
Two-party-preferred result
Labor	Jackie Ormsby	3,692	56.0	−9.7
Liberal	Mark Liedel	2,903	44.0	+9.7
Two-candidate-preferred result
Independent	Larry Graham	4,571	69.2	+69.2
Labor	Jackie Ormsby	2,038	30.8	−34.9
Independent gain from Labor		Swing	+69.2	

=== Elections in the 1990s ===
1996 Western Australian state election: Pilbara
Party	Candidate	Votes	%	±%
Labor	Larry Graham	4,284	63.8	+4.9
Liberal	Domenick Palumbo	1,964	29.3	+5.8
National	Anne O'Donoghue	465	6.9	+6.8
Total formal votes		6,713	95.4	+0.5
Informal votes		324	4.6	−0.5
Turnout		7,037	68.1	
Two-party-preferred result
Labor	Larry Graham	4,407	65.7	−2.4
Liberal	Domenick Palumbo	2,300	34.3	+2.4
Labor hold		Swing	−2.4	

1993 Western Australian state election: Pilbara
Party	Candidate	Votes	%	±%
Labor	Larry Graham	4,840	56.2	−0.3
Liberal	Pamela Walsh	2,051	23.8	−7.0
Independent	Allan Hutcheson	598	6.9	+6.9
Independent	Karen Merrin	528	6.1	+6.1
Greens	David Flynn	311	3.6	+3.6
Democrats	Glenis Cooper	219	2.5	+2.5
Independent	Rodney Tregonning	72	0.8	+0.8
Total formal votes		8,619	95.2	+4.3
Informal votes		438	4.8	−4.3
Turnout		9,057	82.9	+4.5
Two-party-preferred result
Labor	Larry Graham	5,769	66.9	+5.4
Liberal	Pamela Walsh	2,850	33.1	−5.4
Labor hold		Swing	+5.4	

=== Elections in the 1980s ===
1989 Western Australian state election: Pilbara
Party	Candidate	Votes	%	±%
Labor	Larry Graham	4,466	56.5	−9.9
Liberal	William Shephard	2,437	30.8	−2.8
Independent	Vincent Cooper	1,003	12.7	+12.7
Total formal votes		7,906	90.9	
Informal votes		792	9.1	
Turnout		8,698	78.4	
Two-party-preferred result
Labor	Larry Graham	4,858	61.5	−4.9
Liberal	William Shepherd	3,048	38.5	+4.9
Labor hold		Swing	−4.9	

1986 Western Australian state election: Pilbara
Party	Candidate	Votes	%	±%
Labor	Pam Buchanan	7,965	64.7	+5.9
Liberal	Johannes Van Uden	4,351	35.3	+0.4
Total formal votes		12,316	97.6	+2.8
Informal votes		306	2.4	−2.8
Turnout		12,622	84.0	−7.3
Labor hold		Swing	−2.8	

1983 Western Australian state election: Pilbara
Party	Candidate	Votes	%	±%
Labor	Pam Buchanan	5,382	58.8	
Liberal	David Penny	3,195	34.9	
Independent	Vincent Cooper	581	6.3	
Total formal votes		9,158	94.8	
Informal votes		498	5.2	
Turnout		9,656	91.3	
Two-party-preferred result
Labor	Pam Buchanan	6,182	67.5	
Liberal	David Penny	2,976	32.5	
Labor gain from Liberal		Swing		

1980 Western Australian state election: Pilbara
Party	Candidate	Votes	%	±%
Liberal	Brian Sodeman	5,880	47.6	−5.2
Labor	Gilbert Barr	5,551	44.9	−2.3
Democrats	Blair Nancarrow	927	7.5	+7.5
Total formal votes		12,358	94.6	−1.7
Informal votes		705	5.4	+1.7
Turnout		13,063	78.2	−5.2
Two-party-preferred result
Liberal	Brian Sodeman	6,383	51.6	−1.2
Labor	Gilbert Barr	5,975	48.4	+1.2
Liberal hold		Swing	−1.2	

=== Elections in the 1970s ===
1977 Western Australian state election: Pilbara
Party	Candidate	Votes	%	±%
Liberal	Brian Sodeman	6,027	52.8	
Labor	Norm Marlborough	5,393	47.2	
Total formal votes		11,420	96.3	
Informal votes		443	3.7	
Turnout		11,863	83.4	
Liberal hold		Swing		

1974 Western Australian state election: Pilbara
Party	Candidate	Votes	%	±%
Liberal	Brian Sodeman	3,440	49.1	
Labor	Arthur Bickerton	3,219	46.0	
Australia	Ian Kelly	347	4.9	
Total formal votes		7,006	93.5	
Informal votes		487	6.5	
Turnout		7,493	82.3	
Two-party-preferred result
Liberal	Brian Sodeman	3,594	51.3	
Labor	Arthur Bickerton	3,412	48.7	
Liberal gain from Labor		Swing		

1971 Western Australian state election: Pilbara
Party	Candidate	Votes	%	±%
Labor	Arthur Bickerton	2,426	63.5	−36.5
Democratic Labor	Michael Barry	1,395	36.5	+36.5
Total formal votes		3,821	94.4	
Informal votes		225	5.6	
Turnout		4,046	76.7	
Labor hold		Swing	N/A	

=== Elections in the 1960s ===
1968 Western Australian state election: Pilbara
Party	Candidate	Votes	%	±%
Labor	Arthur Bickerton	unopposed		
Labor hold		Swing		

1965 Western Australian state election: Pilbara
Party	Candidate	Votes	%	±%
Labor	Arthur Bickerton	976	67.2	−32.8
Liberal and Country	David Hughes	476	32.8	+32.8
Total formal votes		1,383	95.5	
Informal votes		69	4.5	
Turnout		1,521	79.6	
Labor hold		Swing	N/A	

1962 Western Australian state election: Pilbara
Party	Candidate	Votes	%	±%
Labor	Arthur Bickerton	unopposed		
Labor hold		Swing		

=== Elections in the 1950s ===
1959 Western Australian state election: Pilbara
Party	Candidate	Votes	%	±%
Labor	Arthur Bickerton	656	62.0	−4.9
Liberal and Country	Neil Radley	402	38.0	+4.9
Total formal votes		1,058	97.4	−1.3
Informal votes		28	2.6	+1.3
Turnout		1,086	76.1	−5.2
Labor hold		Swing	−4.9	

1958 Pilbara state by-election
Party	Candidate	Votes	%	±%
Labor	Arthur Bickerton	unopposed		
Labor hold		Swing		

1956 Western Australian state election: Pilbara
Party	Candidate	Votes	%	±%
Labor	Alec Rodoreda	662	66.9	
Liberal and Country	Rowland Charlton	327	33.1	
Total formal votes		989	98.7	
Informal votes		13	1.3	
Turnout		1,002	81.3	
Labor hold		Swing		

1953 Western Australian state election: Pilbara
Party	Candidate	Votes	%	±%
Labor	Alec Rodoreda	607	66.0	+8.7
Liberal and Country	Rowland Charlton	313	34.0	−8.7
Total formal votes		920	97.9	−0.3
Informal votes		20	2.1	+0.3
Turnout		940	82.9	+5.7
Labor hold		Swing	+8.7	

1950 Western Australian state election: Pilbara
Party	Candidate	Votes	%	±%
Labor	Alec Rodoreda	538	57.3	
Liberal and Country	Leonard Taplin	401	42.7	
Total formal votes		939	98.2	
Informal votes		17	1.8	
Turnout		956	77.2	
Labor hold		Swing		

=== Elections in the 1940s ===
1947 Pilbara state by-election
Party	Candidate	Votes	%	±%
Labor	Bill Hegney	302	52.7	+2.6
Independent	Leonard Taplin	271	47.3	−2.6
Total formal votes		573	99.5	+2.0
Informal votes		3	0.5	−2.0
Turnout		576	78.3	+4.7
Labor hold		Swing	+2.6	

1947 Western Australian state election: Pilbara
Party	Candidate	Votes	%	±%
Labor	Bill Hegney	235*	50.1	−14.6
Independent	Leonard Taplin	234	49.9	+49.9
Total formal votes		468	97.5	+0.8
Informal votes		12	2.5	−0.8
Turnout		480	73.6	−5.3
Labor hold		Swing	N/A	

- Includes the casting vote of the returning officer. The result was challenged and resulted in the 1947 Pilbara state by-election.

1943 Western Australian state election: Pilbara
Party	Candidate	Votes	%	±%
Labor	Bill Hegney	401	64.7	+12.1
Country	Peter Cassey	173	27.9	+27.9
Independent Labor	Don McLeod	46	7.4	+7.4
Total formal votes		620	96.7	−2.4
Informal votes		21	3.3	+2.4
Turnout		641	78.9	−6.9
Labor hold		Swing	N/A	

- Preferences were not distributed.

=== Elections in the 1930s ===
1939 Western Australian state election: Pilbara
Party	Candidate	Votes	%	±%
Labor	Bill Hegney	431	52.6	+12.0
Nationalist	Frank Welsh	388	47.4	−12.0
Total formal votes		819	99.1	−0.1
Informal votes		7	0.9	+0.1
Turnout		826	85.8	+2.0
Labor gain from Nationalist		Swing	+12.0	

1936 Western Australian state election: Pilbara
Party	Candidate	Votes	%	±%
Nationalist	Frank Welsh	358	59.4	+1.5
Labor	Donald Bennett	245	40.6	−1.5
Total formal votes		603	99.2	+2.9
Informal votes		5	0.8	−2.9
Turnout		608	83.8	−3.8
Nationalist hold		Swing	+1.5	

1933 Western Australian state election: Pilbara
Party	Candidate	Votes	%	±%
Nationalist	Frank Welsh	268	57.9	+18.6
Labor	James McGuire	195	42.1	−12.2
Total formal votes		445	96.3	−3.0
Informal votes		18	3.7	+3.0
Turnout		481	87.6	+3.4
Nationalist gain from Labor		Swing	N/A	

1930 Western Australian state election: Pilbara
Party	Candidate	Votes	%	±%
Labor	Alfred Lamond	229	54.3	
Nationalist	Edward Greene	166	39.3	
Independent	William Maher	27	6.4	
Total formal votes		422	99.3	
Informal votes		3	0.7	
Turnout		425	84.2	
Labor hold		Swing		

=== Elections in the 1920s ===
1927 Western Australian state election: Pilbara
Party	Candidate	Votes	%	±%
Labor	Alfred Lamond	223	55.2	+9.5
Nationalist	Henry Underwood	149	36.9	−1.7
Independent Labor	Edward Snell	32	7.9	+7.9
Total formal votes		404	98.3	+3.2
Informal votes		7	1.7	−3.2
Turnout		411	78.6	+22.3
Labor hold		Swing	N/A	

- Preferences were not distributed.

1924 Western Australian state election: Pilbara
Party	Candidate	Votes	%	±%
Labor	Alfred Lamond	195	45.7	+10.1
National Labor	Henry Underwood	165	38.6	+38.6
Executive Country	Arthur Brown	67	15.7	+15.7
Total formal votes		427	95.1	−3.6
Informal votes		22	4.9	+3.6
Turnout		449	56.3	−1.8
Two-party-preferred result
Labor	Alfred Lamond	225	52.7	+17.1
National Labor	Henry Underwood	202	47.3	+47.3
Labor gain from Independent		Swing	N/A	

1921 Western Australian state election: Pilbara
Party	Candidate	Votes	%	±%
Independent	Henry Underwood	241	64.4	−35.6
Labor	Arthur Edwards	133	35.6	+35.6
Total formal votes		374	98.7	
Informal votes		5	98.7	
Turnout		379	58.1	
Independent gain from National Labor		Swing	N/A	

=== Elections in the 1910s ===
1917 Western Australian state election: Pilbara
Party	Candidate	Votes	%	±%
National Labor	Henry Underwood	unopposed		
National Labor hold		Swing		

1914 Western Australian state election: Pilbara
Party	Candidate	Votes	%	±%
Labor	Henry Underwood	352	52.9	−1.1
Liberal	Michael Corbett	314	47.1	+1.1
Total formal votes		666	99.7	+0.9
Informal votes		2	0.3	−0.9
Turnout		668	66.5	−1.9
Labor hold		Swing	−1.1	

1911 Western Australian state election: Pilbara
Party	Candidate	Votes	%	±%
Labor	Henry Underwood	413	54.0	
Ministerialist	George Miles	352	46.0	
Total formal votes		765	98.8	
Informal votes		9	1.2	
Turnout		774	68.4	
Labor hold		Swing		

=== Elections in the 1900s ===
1908 Western Australian state election: Pilbara
Party	Candidate	Votes	%	±%
Labour	Henry Underwood	468	58.1	+4.7
Ministerialist	John Weir	338	41.9	−4.7
Total formal votes		806	99.1	+0.4
Informal votes		7	0.9	−0.4
Turnout		811	76.1	+37.2
Labour hold		Swing	−4.7	

1906 Pilbara state by-election
Party	Candidate	Votes	%	±%
Labour	Henry Underwood	286	53.4	+53.4
Ministerialist	John Hopkins	250	46.6	N/A
Total formal votes		536	99.1	
Informal votes		7	0.9	
Turnout		546	38.9	
Labor gain from Ministerialist		Swing	N/A	

1905 Western Australian state election: Pilbara
Party	Candidate	Votes	%	±%
Ministerialist	James Isdell	unopposed		
Ministerialist hold		Swing		

1904 Western Australian state election: Pilbara
Party	Candidate	Votes	%	±%
Ministerialist	James Isdell	428	64.7	+11.0
Labour	John Carey	234	35.3	+35.3
Total formal votes		662	99.7	+0.4
Informal votes		12	0.3	–0.4
Turnout		664	53.2	+12.9
Ministerialist hold		Swing	N/A	

1903 Pilbara state by-election
Party	Candidate	Votes	%	±%
Independent	James Isdell	157	53.8	
Independent	John Montgomerie	135	46.2	
Total formal votes		292	99.3	
Informal votes		2	0.7	
Turnout		294	40.3	
Independent hold		Swing	N/A	

1901 Western Australian state election: Pilbara
Party	Candidate	Votes	%	±%
Opposition	Walter Kingsmill	unopposed		
Opposition hold		Swing		

=== Elections in the 1890s ===
1897 Western Australian colonial election: Pilbara
Party	Candidate	Votes	%	±%
Independent	Walter Kingsmill	110	68.8	
Independent	Edward Edgecumbe	50	31.2	
Total formal votes		160	98.2	
Informal votes		3	1.8	
Turnout		163	62.5	
Independent hold		Swing		

1894 Western Australian colonial election: Albany
Party	Candidate	Votes	%	±%
None	George Leake	187	50.1	+50.1
None	Francis Dymes	186	49.9	+49.9
