= Electoral results for the district of Ashburton =

Western Australian district election results

This is a list of electoral results for the electoral district of Ashburton in Western Australian state elections.

== Members for Ashburton ==
Ashburton (1890–1901)
Member	Party	Term
Septimus Burt	Ministerial	1890–1900
David Forrest	Ministerial	1900–1901
Ashburton (1989–1996)
Member	Party	Term
Pam Buchanan	Labor	1989–1991
Pam Buchanan	Independent	1991–1992
Fred Riebeling	Labor	1992–1996

== Election results ==
=== Elections in the 1990s ===
1993 Western Australian state election: Ashburton
Party	Candidate	Votes	%	±%
Labor	Fred Riebeling	4,088	52.9	−0.6
Liberal	Joy West	2,923	37.9	−0.2
Greens	Hugh Paterson	712	9.2	+9.2
Total formal votes		7,723	95.9	+2.9
Informal votes		330	4.1	−2.9
Turnout		8,053	88.2	+7.8
Two-party-preferred result
Labor	Fred Riebeling	4,490	58.1	+0.2
Liberal	Joy West	3,233	41.9	−0.2
Labor hold		Swing	+0.2	

1992 Ashburton state by-election
Party	Candidate	Votes	%	±%
Labor	Fred Riebeling	3,760	47.5	−6.0
Liberal	Joy West	3,173	40.1	+2.0
Greens	Hugh Paterson	984	12.4	+12.4
Total formal votes		7,917	97.1	+4.9
Informal votes		234	2.9	−4.9
Turnout		8,151	83.4	+3.0
Two-party-preferred result
Labor	Fred Riebeling	4,332	54.7	−3.2
Liberal	Joy West	3,585	45.8	+3.2
Labor hold		Swing	−3.2	

=== Elections in the 1980s ===
1989 Western Australian state election: Ashburton
Party	Candidate	Votes	%	±%
Labor	Pam Buchanan	3,639	53.5	−12.4
Liberal	Maurice Harper	2,592	38.1	+4.0
Independent	David Fort	575	8.5	+8.5
Total formal votes		6,806	93.0	
Informal votes		509	7.0	
Turnout		7,315	80.4	
Two-party-preferred result
Labor	Pam Buchanan	3,941	57.9	−8.0
Liberal	Maurice Harper	2,865	42.1	+8.0
Labor hold		Swing	−8.0	

=== Elections in the 1900s ===
1900 Ashburton colonial by-election
Party	Candidate	Votes	%	±%
Ministerialist	David Forrest	unopposed		
Ministerialist hold		Swing		

=== Elections in the 1890s ===
1897 Western Australian colonial election: Ashburton
Party	Candidate	Votes	%	±%
Ministerialist	Septimus Burt	unopposed		
Ministerialist hold		Swing		

1894 Western Australian colonial election: Ashburton
Party	Candidate	Votes	%	±%
None	Septimus Burt	unopposed		

1890 Western Australian colonial election: Ashburton
Party	Candidate	Votes	%	±%
None	Septimus Burt	unopposed		
