= Electoral results for the district of Burrup =

Western Australian district election results

This is a list of electoral results for the Electoral district of Burrup in Western Australian elections.

== Members for Burrup ==
Member	Party	Term
Fred Riebeling	Labor	1996–2005

== Election results ==
=== Elections in the 2000s ===
2001 Western Australian state election: Burrup
Party	Candidate	Votes	%	±%
Labor	Fred Riebeling	4,899	55.3	+7.8
Liberal	Robin Vandenberg	2,453	27.7	−11.1
One Nation	Chris Dempsey	993	11.2	+11.2
Greens	Scott Ryan	519	5.9	+5.9
Total formal votes		8,864	96.1	−0.1
Informal votes		358	3.9	+0.1
Turnout		9,222	85.4	
Two-party-preferred result
Labor	Fred Riebeling	5,749	65.0	+13.3
Liberal	Robin Vandenberg	3,091	35.0	−13.3
Labor hold		Swing	+13.3	

=== Elections in the 1990s ===
1996 Western Australian state election: Burrup
Party	Candidate	Votes	%	±%
Labor	Fred Riebeling	4,436	47.5	−7.8
Liberal	Barry Haase	3,627	38.8	+4.7
National	Paul Ausburn	1,284	13.7	+13.7
Total formal votes		9,347	96.2	+0.2
Informal votes		365	3.8	−0.2
Turnout		9,712	84.1	
Two-party-preferred result
Labor	Fred Riebeling	4,828	51.7	−9.7
Liberal	Barry Haase	4,518	48.3	+9.7
Labor hold		Swing	−9.7	
