= Burrup =

Burrup may refer to:

- Burrup Peninsula (Murujuga), an island in the Dampier Archipelago, Western Australia
- Electoral district of Burrup, Western Australia 1996-2005
- Eddie Burrup, a pseudonym under which Elizabeth Durack painted in the 1970s and '80s
