= Demasson's House and Shop =

Building in Toodyay, Western Australia

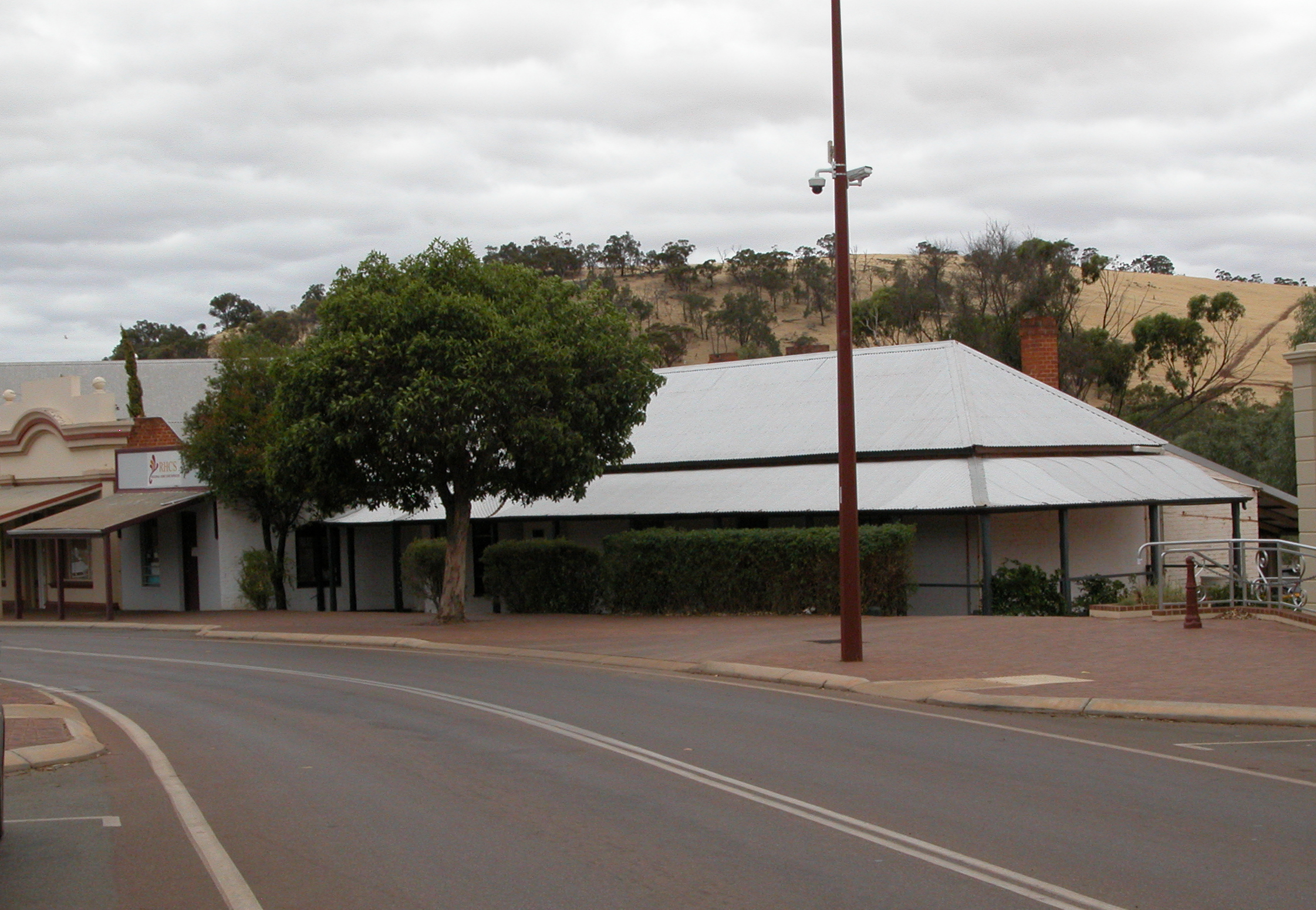
- Demasson's House and Shop
- Interactive map of the Demasson's House and Shop area
- Alternative names: Mrs. O'Reilly's Cottage

General information
- Architectural style: Victorian Vernacular
- Location: 98 Stirling Terrace, Toodyay
- Coordinates: 31.5502°S 116.4693°E
- Completed: c1872
- Renovated: c1875

References
- Toodyay municipal inventory

Demasson's House and Shop is situated on Stirling Terrace in Toodyay, Western Australia.

It was constructed in two stages. The shop was built around 1872 for Daniel Connor. By 1875 William Amed Demasson, a carpenter wheelwright from Guildford, Western Australia, had added a dwelling with a connecting door to the store, which was at the time run by his wife. In 1886 Demasson purchased the store from Connor. Land titles show the Toodyay Road Board purchased the dwelling from Amy Twine in 1945. When the doctor's residence and surgery in Lincoln Street were demolished for the standard gauge railway in 1963, this dwelling was rented to Dr. P. O'Reilly and the shop became his surgery. Mrs O'Reilly was given life-time occupancy of the dwelling after her husband died in 1981; she remained there until she died in October 2005.

The building is still commonly referred to as Mrs. O'Reilly's Cottage. In 2010 the Royalties for Regions programme was able to fund renovation works to the building.

In recent years portions of the premises have been used as a gallery, the Toodyay Society/Toodyay Historical Society headquarters and as a home for Shire of Toodyay employees.
