= Electoral district of Pilbara =

State electoral district of Western Australia

Pilbara Western Australia—Legislative Assembly
- Interactive map of electoral district boundaries from the 2025 state election
- State: Western Australia
- Dates current: 1894–present^{1}
- MP: Kevin Michel
- Party: Labor
- Namesake: Pilbara region
- Electors: 29,731 (2025)
- Area: 220,327 km^{2} (85,068.7 sq mi)
- Demographic: Provincial, remote and rural
- Coordinates: 21.60°S 116.34°E
Electorates around Pilbara:
Indian Ocean	Indian Ocean	Kimberley
Indian Ocean	Pilbara	Kimberley
Mid-West	Mid-West	Kimberley

Footnotes
- ^{1}known as Central Kimberley-Pilbara, 2005–2008

The electoral district of Pilbara is a Legislative Assembly electorate in the state of Western Australia. It is named for the Pilbara, the region in which it is located, although it extends to part of the neighbouring Gascoyne region, including the town of Exmouth. Its main towns are Karratha and Port Hedland.

It is one of the oldest electorates in Western Australia, with its first member having been elected to the Second Parliament of the Legislative Assembly at the 1894 elections. Since 2017 the member for Pilbara has been Kevin Michel of the Labor Party.

== History ==
Pilbara (historically spelled Pilbarra) was created at the 1893 redistribution in the Constitution Act Amendment Act 1893, through which three new electorates were created in mining and pastoral areas. Its first member was elected at the 1894 election, and while normally a Labor-held seat, it has been held by the Liberals and their predecessors for significant terms. In 1898, its major settlements were Marble Bar, Nullagine, and Bamboo (a gold mining town), and it included the southern Pilbarra goldfield.

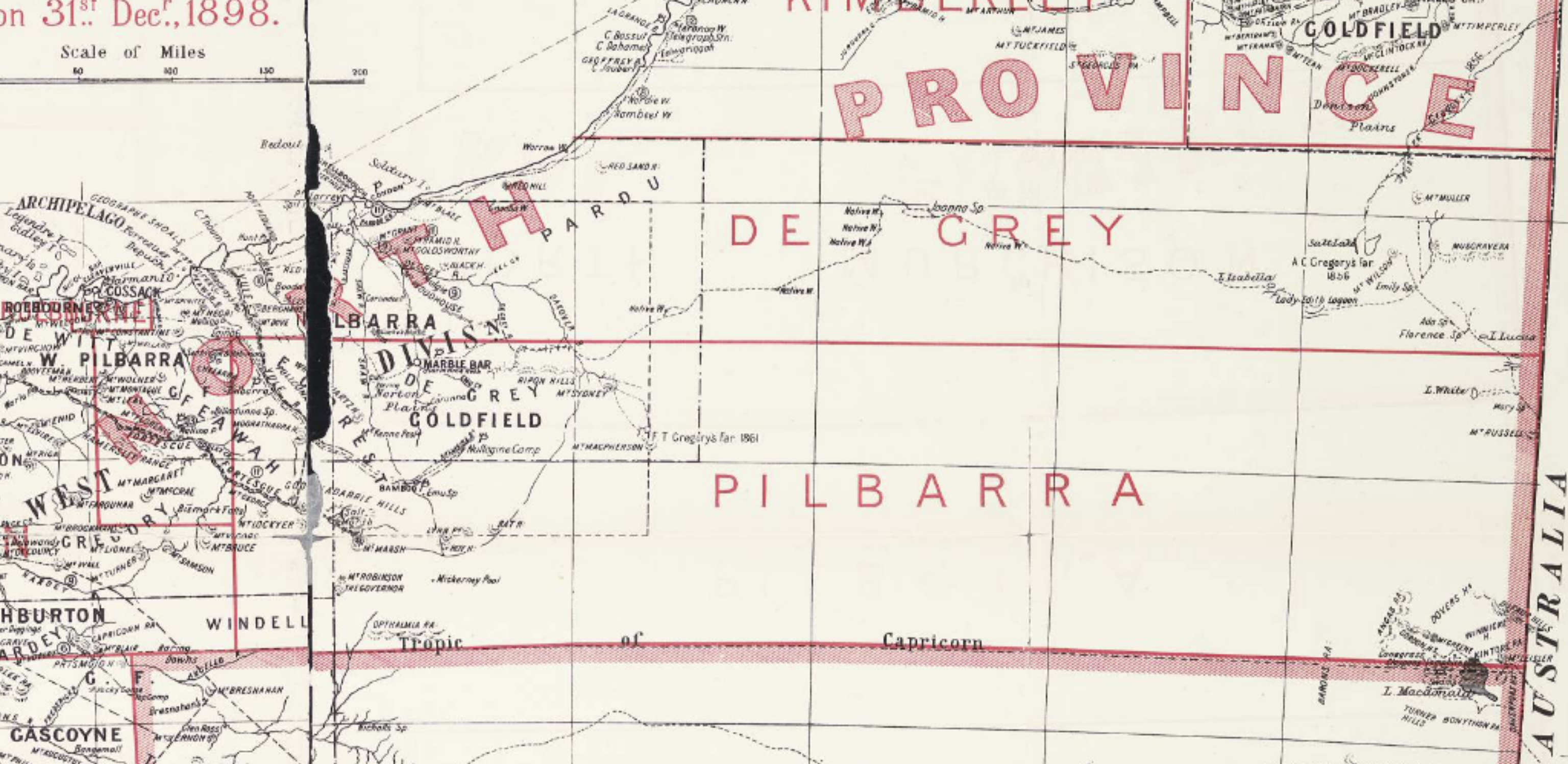
Pilbara and surrounds in 1898

Pilbara's second member, Walter Kingsmill, was a prominent member of Leake's opposition, serving as a Minister in the Leake, James and Rason governments between 1901 and 1906. The seat was first won for Labor at a 1906 by-election, which was won by Henry Underwood against Ministerial opponent John Marquis Hopkins. He became part of the National Labor movement led by John Scaddan in early 1917, and later served in a Nationalist ministry under Henry Lefroy as a minister without portfolio. He was defeated by a Labor rival, Alfred Lamond in the 1924 election, but on Lamond's retirement at the 1933 election, the seat became the only seat to switch from Labor to Nationalist in the state in what proved to be a disastrous election for the Nationalists which relegated them to third place behind the Country Party.

Labor recovered the seat in 1939, who held it continuously until the 1974 election, when Charles Court's Liberals defeated Labor premier John Tonkin's one-seat majority. Labor recovered the seat when they won government again in 1983, with the seat's first female member Pam Buchanan, who later became a minister in the Lawrence government. In 1989, she shifted to the new seat of Ashburton, and Larry Graham won Pilbara for the Labor party. He resigned from the Labor party in 2000, and served as an Independent until his retirement at the 2005 election, and Labor's Tom Stephens, who had resigned his Legislative Council seat and unsuccessfully contested Kalgoorlie at the 2004 election, won the seat, which for one term was known as Central Kimberley-Pilbara due to a redistribution. The name reverted to Pilbara at the 2008 redistribution. At the 2013 election the seat was contested by National Party leader Brendon Grylls who gained the seat with 61.5% of the two party preferred vote. After one term as the member for Pilbara, Grylls was defeated at the state election in 2017 by Labor's Kevin Michel.

== Geography ==
As of 2025, the electorate consists of the City of Karratha, the Town of Port Hedland, the entirety of both the shires of Ashburton and Exmouth and the western half of the Shire of East Pilbara.

Before 2007, The Pilbara electorate contained the eastern parts of the Shire of Ashburton, including the mining towns of Tom Price, Paraburdoo and Pannawonica; the Town of Port Hedland including Port Hedland; the Shire of East Pilbara including Newman and Marble Bar and extending to the eastern boundary of the State; and the western and northern sections of the Shire of Ngaanyatjarraku, which is relatively unpopulated (especially as it excludes the town of Warburton) was added in order to balance the land areas of Pilbara and Kalgoorlie. The area's economy is centred on mining, particularly iron ore, and a significant proportion of the voting population are Aboriginal.

The 2007 redistribution, which took effect at the 2008 election, resulted in the seat losing areas it had gained in the previous distribution, including Fitzroy Crossing and Halls Creek in the Kimberley region, but it gained the large town of Newman from the abolished Murchison-Eyre.

The 2011 redistribution, which took effect at the 2013 election, saw Pilbara gain the Shire of Roebourne from the renamed North West Central electorate, in exchange for the remnants of the Shire of Ashburton, and the Shire of Ngaanyatjarraku was ceded to the Kalgoorlie electorate. That theoretically increased Labor's hold on the seat, but the popularity of the WA Nationals' Royalties for Regions policy made it marginal, so much so that, at the election, it was comfortably won by the then Nationals' leader, Brendon Grylls.

The 2023 redistribution, which took effect at the 2025 election, resulted in the North West Central electorate being abolished. Pilbara therefore regained the entirety of the Shire of Ashburton as well as the Shire of Exmouth in the neighbouring Gascoyne region while ceding lowly populated parts of East Pilbara to Kimberley.

== Members for Pilbara ==
Member	Party	Term
Henry Keep	Non-aligned	1894–1897
Walter Kingsmill	Oppositionist	1897–1903
James Isdell	Independent	1903–1904
James Isdell	Ministerialist	1904–1906
Henry Underwood	Labor	1906–1917
Henry Underwood	Nationalist	1917–1924
Alfred Lamond	Labor	1924–1933
Frank Welsh	Nationalist	1933–1939
Bill Hegney	Labor	1939–1950
Aloysius Rodoreda	Labor	1950–1958
Arthur Bickerton	Labor	1958–1974
Brian Sodeman	Liberal	1974–1983
Pam Buchanan	Labor	1983–1989
Larry Graham	Labor	1989–2000
Larry Graham	Independent Labor	2000–2005
Tom Stephens	Labor	2005–2013
Brendon Grylls	National	2013–2017
Kevin Michel	Labor	2017–present

== Results ==
2025 Western Australian state election: Pilbara
Party	Candidate	Votes	%	±%
Labor	Kevin Michel	6,582	36.1	−22.1
Liberal	Amanda Kailis	4,382	24.0	+15.7
National	Kieran Dart	2,983	16.4	−4.5
One Nation	Brenton Johannsen	1,594	8.7	+5.8
Greens	Niels Glahn-Bertelsen	1,299	7.1	+3.4
Legalise Cannabis	Georgina Wilkinson	817	4.5	+4.5
Shooters, Fishers, Farmers	Leanne Lockyer	584	3.2	+0.1
Total formal votes		18,241	94.8	−0.5
Informal votes		995	5.2	+0.5
Turnout		19,236	64.7	−4.2
Two-party-preferred result
Labor	Kevin Michel	9,218	50.6	−17.1
Liberal	Amanda Kailis	9,011	49.4	+49.4
Labor hold				
