= Brian Sodeman =

Australian politician

Member of the Legislative Assembly of Western Australia
- In office 30 March 1974 – 19 February 1983
- Preceded by: Arthur Bickerton
- Succeeded by: Pam Buchanan
- Constituency: Pilbara

Personal details
- Born: 7 April 1942 (age 83) Victoria Park, Western Australia, Australia
- Party: Liberal

Brian Sodeman (born 7 April 1942) is a former Australian politician who was a Liberal Party member of the Legislative Assembly of Western Australia from 1974 to 1983, representing the seat of Pilbara.

Sodeman was born in Perth, and moved to the North West in the 1960s to work as an engineer. He was elected to parliament at the 1974 state election, defeating the sitting Labor member, Arthur Bickerton. He was the first non-Labor member for Pilbara since Frank Welsh's defeat at the 1939 election. Sodeman increased his margin slightly at the 1977 election, defeating the Labor candidate Norm Marlborough with 52.8 percent of the two-party-preferred vote. This decreased to 51.6 percent at the 1980 election, making it one of the most marginal seats in the state. However, Sodeman chose not to contest the 1983 election, retiring from politics after a little less than nine years in office. The seat of Pilbara was won by the Labor candidate, Pam Buchanan, with a large margin.

Parliament of Western Australia
Preceded by Arthur Bickerton	Member for Pilbara; 1974–1983	Succeeded by Pam Buchanan
