= William Amed Demasson =

- Born: 14 May 1853
- Died: 14 May 1924 (aged 71)
- Occupations: Carpenter, wheelwright
- Spouses: Sarah Dudley (married 1872–1874); Lavinia Stevens (married 1879–1924

William Amed Demasson, a carpenter and wheelwright by trade, was one of Toodyay's citizens who made a substantial contribution to the civic life of the town. Among the many organizations that he belonged to, he is particularly associated with the formation of a branch of the Independent Order of Oddfellows Manchester Unity in Toodyay, or Newcastle, as it was known at the time.

Demasson was born in Guildford on 14 May 1853 to James Amed and Eliza Jane (née Cook). He worked as a carpenter, wheelwright and contractor in Guildford and around 1872 married Sarah Dudley (1847-1874) of Northam, daughter of John and Ann Dudley. In 1872 a daughter Esther Ann was born. Sarah died in 1874 while giving birth to their second child, a son William Amed, who also died.

By 1875, Demasson was living in Toodyay. He became actively involved in the town's activities, and in March 1877 became a foundation member of the Newcastle branch of the Independent Order of Oddfellows, a benevolent global organization that used members’ contributions to provide assistance in times of sickness and need. As such it attracted a number of members to its cause. Demasson was its first and only secretary, serving the organization for 42 years before it was disbanded.

Every March, on the anniversary of their foundation in Newcastle, the Oddfellows gathered at their meeting place at Leeder’s Hotel, where they formed a procession in full regalia and marched to the Anglican Church. They were headed by Marris’ Brass Band and Brother Demasson bearing the family Bible on a velvet cushion.

In 1877, Demasson and W. Donegan were elected to represent the East Ward following Newcastle becoming a municipality in that year. He continued to serve as a town councillor for about 16 years. The first meeting of the council was held in the Mechanics' Institute building. Demasson was the secretary of the Mechanics' Institute for 20 years. He also became a justice of the peace, serving the Toodyay and Northam Magisterial Districts for 22 years.

In January 1879, Demasson married Lavinia Stevens (1856-1947), the daughter of William and Marianne (née Chapman). The couple had five children: Laura Lavinia (b.1880), Edith Grace (1882) who died in 1886 of diphtheria, Amy Constance (1884), Ruth Marianne (b.1889) and Chapman (b.1894). Some years later, in 1906, there was another outbreak of diphtheria; Demasson and the builder Joseph Ablett Wroth had the task of making many small coffins.

At first the couple and their newborn daughter lived in a Pensioner Guard cottage while Demasson built "some rooms on a position of land he had bought, in the main street". The rooms referred to were for the building locally known as Dr O'Reilly's house. Their home was completed before the birth of their second child in February 1882. When the third child Amy was born in September 1884, Demasson was adding rooms to the house. It was on a deep block that enabled him to build his workshop as well as stables for his horses at the back. Lavinia established a flower garden. According to Lavinia's memoirs, the front room was turned "into a small store, by making shelves all round, and counters etc… and I looked after it myself with Ettie helping…". The shop within the house proved to be inconvenient so Demasson bought the shop next door from Daniel Connor and joined it to his house with a connecting door, to form Demasson's House and Shop.

During this time, Demasson continued to work as a building contractor. He won the government contract to renovate the old convict buildings where the courthouse, post office and school were located. In 1887, he built the Old Newcastle School. He also bought land from the Deepdale Estate with a frontage along the Avon River and planted grapevines and fruit trees, "meaning later to build a house to live in".

At some point Demasson appears to have ceased his building trade to become a storekeeper, before retiring c. 1900. It may have been at this time that he and Lavinia moved to "Keynsham" on Julimar Road, the property he had developed along the river. "Keynsham", also known as "Keynsham Orchard", became well known for its orchard and vineyardand Demasson became a member of the Fruitgrowers' Association and a committee member of the statewide co-operative Winegrowers Association. This organization had been formed as a result of competition from South Australia.

In 1924, Demasson became seriously ill. The couple decided to sell "Keynsham" and moved back into town to live with their daughter and son-in-law T.J. Donegan. Demasson died at their home of a cerebral haemorrhage on 14 May 1924. He was buried in the Church of England section of Toodyay's cemetery.

== Contribution to the town's renaming ==
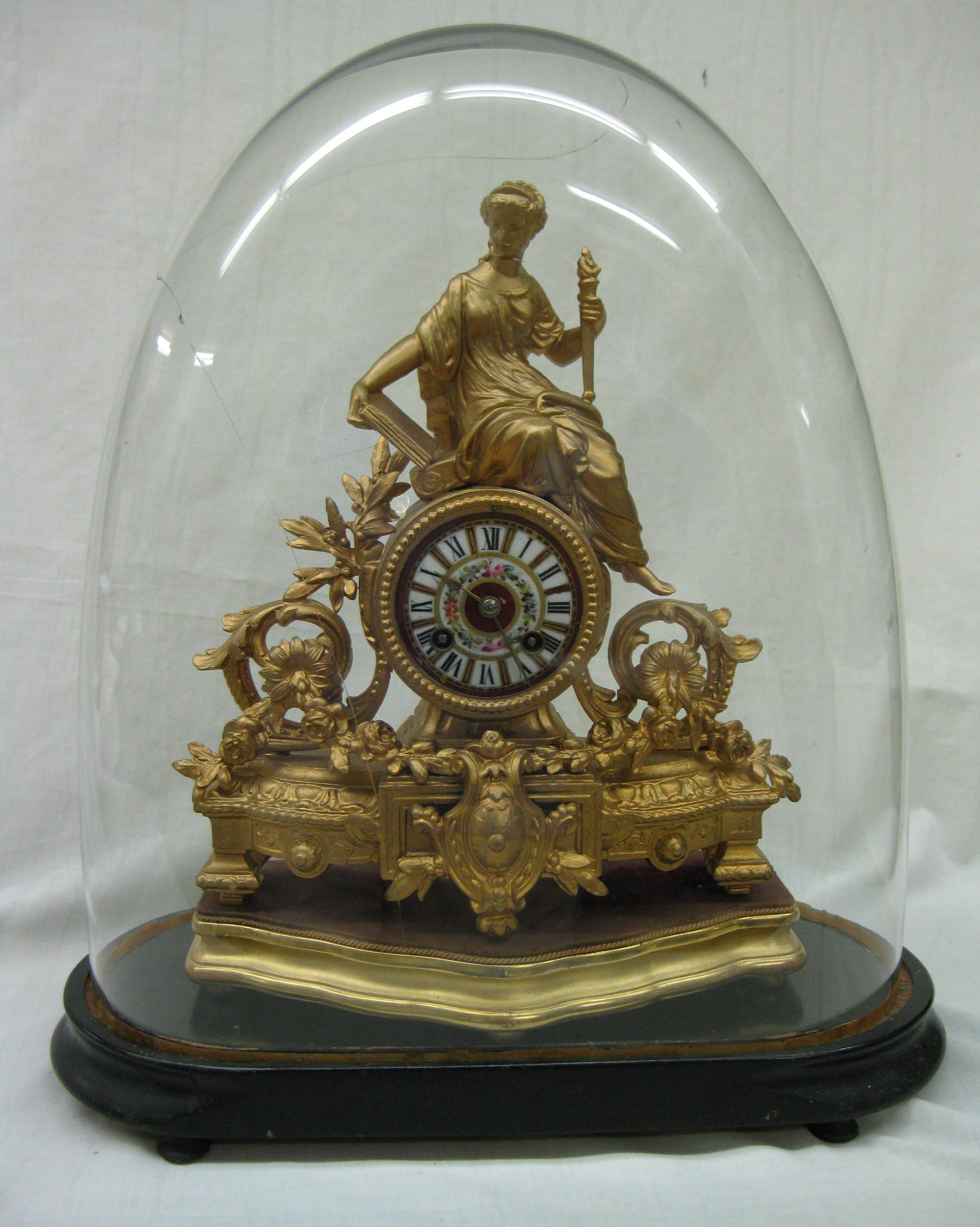
The French Ormolu Clock

Apart from his direct contributions to Toodyay, Demasson indirectly contributed to the renaming of Newcastle to Toodyay. Around 1908 or earlier, he had ordered a French domed ormolu clock from London, but it was mistakenly delivered to Newcastle, New South Wales – as were many items around that time. The clock was unclaimed in New South Wales, but chanced upon by John Forrest (then serving in Federal parliament), who knew Demasson and realised that the clock had been sent to the wrong Newcastle. This incident is known to have contributed to the call for changing the town's name to Toodyay.
