= Arthur Bickerton =

Australian politician

Member of the Legislative Assembly of Western Australia
- In office 24 April 1958 – 30 March 1974
- Preceded by: Aloysius Rodoreda
- Succeeded by: Brian Sodeman
- Constituency: Pilbara

Personal details
- Born: 27 August 1919 Ringwood, Victoria, Australia
- Died: 18 June 1992 (aged 72) Nedlands, Western Australia, Australia
- Party: Labor

Arthur William Bickerton (27 August 1919 – 18 June 1992) was an Australian politician who was a Labor Party member of the Legislative Assembly of Western Australia from 1958 to 1974, representing the seat of Pilbara. He served as a minister in the government of John Tonkin.

Bickerton was born in Melbourne, and after leaving school worked as a farm labourer in Gippsland, Gippsland. He enlisted in the Australian Army in 1940, and by the end of the war was a captain in the Royal Australian Artillery. After being discharged from the military, Bickerton moved to New South Wales, where he managed mines at Muswellbrook and Ben Bullen, and eventually founded his own contracting business at Lithgow. He moved to Western Australia in 1955, to work at a tin mine on the Pilbara's Shaw River. Bickerton was elected to the Marble Bar Road Board in 1956, serving until he was elected to state parliament at the 1958 Pilbara by-election (occasioned by the death of the sitting member, Aloysius Rodoreda).

After Labor's victory at the 1971 state election, Bickerton was appointed Minister for Housing and Minister for Fuel in the Tonkin ministry. In a 1972 reshuffle, he was replaced as Minister for Fuel by Don May, but was additionally made Minister for Fisheries and Fauna. In another reshuffle the following year, Bickerton was made Minister for the North-West. The Labor government was defeated at the 1974 election, with the seat of Pilbara falling to the Liberal candidate Brian Sodeman, a 31-year-old engineer. Bickerton became the first serving minister since James Kenneally in 1936 to lose his seat at a general election. After leaving politics, he served as a director of various mining companies, and was also chairman of the Greyhound Racing Association from 1984 to 1987. Bickerton died in Perth in 1992, aged 72.

Parliament of Western Australia
Preceded by Aloysius Rodoreda	Member for Pilbara; 1958–1974	Succeeded by Brian Sodeman
Political offices
Preceded by Don Taylor	Minister for Housing; 1971–1974	Succeeded by Des O'Neil
New creation	Minister for Fuel; 1971–1972	Succeeded by Don May
Preceded by Ron Davies	Minister for Fisheries and Fauna; 1972–1974	Succeeded by Matt Stephens
Preceded by Herb Graham	Minister for the North-West; 1973–1974	Succeeded by Alan Ridge
