= Tom Stephens =

Australian politician

The Honourable Tom Stephens OAM

Member of the Western Australian Legislative Assembly for Pilbara
- In office 26 February 2005 – 9 March 2013
- Preceded by: New seat
- Succeeded by: Brendon Grylls

Member of the Legislative Council of Western Australia
- In office 31 July 1982 – 21 May 1989 Serving with Peter Dowding, Tom Helm
- Preceded by: Bill Withers
- Succeeded by: None (seat abolished)
- Constituency: North Province
- In office 22 May 1989 – 16 September 2004
- Constituency: Mining and Pastoral

Personal details
- Party: Labor Party

Tom Stephens is a former State parliamentarian in Western Australia. He served from 1982 until 2013, in the Labor Party.

== Career ==
Stephens served as a Labor Party member of the Parliament of Western Australia from 1982 to 2013. He served first in the Legislative Council from 1982 to 2004, and then in the Legislative Assembly from 2005 until his retirement on 9 March 2013. He was briefly a minister in the Lawrence Labor government from 1992 to 1993, and then in the Gallop government from 2001 to 2004.

Stephens was first elected to the Legislative Council at a 1982 by-election for the seat of North Province, sparked by the resignation of Liberal MLC Bill Withers. He was re-elected for North Province in 1983, and then in 1989 for the redistributed seat of the new Mining and Pastoral electoral region. He was re-elected in Mining and Pastoral in 1993, 1996 and 2001.

Stephens served as a parliamentary secretary and as a minister in the Lawrence government in the 1990s; he was Leader of the Labor Opposition in the Legislative Council until the 2001 election of the new Labor government under Geoff Gallop, when he was elected into the ministry. He initially served as Minister for Housing and Works, and then later added Local Government and Regional Development to his portfolios. He also held the portfolios of the Kimberley, Pilbara and Gascoyne, Regional Development and Heritage.

In late 2004, the Labor candidate for the rural seat of Kalgoorlie for the 2004 federal election, Kevin Richards, died suddenly during the final stages of that Federal campaign. Stephens, who was already preselected for the Legislative Assembly seat of Central Kimberley-Pilbara, was drafted as a last-minute replacement candidate for the Federal seat of Kalgoorlie. Stephens duly resigned from the WA State Cabinet and the WA Legislative Council, nominated and ran for that Federal seat; he was defeated at that contest by incumbent Liberal MP Barry Haase. Stephens subsequently contested and won the WA state seat of Central Kimberley Pilbara at the 2005 election. He chaired the Education and Health Standing Committee until September 2008 and was elected as Member for Pilbara at the October 2008 elections and served as a member of the Standing Committee on Community Development & Justice.

Stephens retired from the WA State Parliament at the 9 March 2013 WA General Elections, aged 61, having served in the parliament for more than 30 years.

== Post-political career ==
Stephens served on the boards of Good to Great Schools Australia (Noel Pearson's Education Reform agency), DSF-SPELD (WA), Lost & Found Opera, IBN, and Yindjibarndi CCL.

== Honours ==
Stephens was awarded the Medal of the Order of Australia (OAM) in the 2014 Australia Day Honours for "service to Indigenous affairs, and to the Parliament of Western Australia".

== Personal life ==
Stephens sings (as a bass) with the University of Western Australia Choral Society and was an avid cyclist.

Western Australian Legislative Assembly
Preceded by Larry Graham	Member for Pilbara; 2005–2013	Succeeded by Brendon Grylls
