= Larry Graham (politician) =

Australian politician

Larry Graham (born 24 December 1950) is a former Australian politician.

He was born in Brisbane and arrived in Western Australia in 1956. He worked as an electrical fitter and trade union official before entering politics. In 1989, he was elected to the Western Australian Legislative Assembly as the Labor member for Pilbara. He was Opposition Regional Spokesman for Pilbara from 1994 to 1996 and Shadow Minister for Regional Development, North West, and Works and Services from 1996 to 1997. He resigned from the Labor Party in 2000 and was re-elected in 2001 as an independent. He retired from politics in 2005. He has three children.

Western Australian Legislative Assembly
Preceded by Pam Buchanan	Member for Pilbara; 1989–2005	Succeeded by Tom Stephens
