= Henry Underwood (politician) =

Australian politician

- Constituency: Pilbara

Personal details
- Born: 31 December 1863 Mount Egerton, Victoria, Australia
- Died: 8 October 1945 (aged 81) Nedlands, Western Australia
- Party: Labor Party (1906–1917); National Labor Party (1917–1924)
- Spouse: Bridget Fitzpatrick
- Profession: Bootmaker

Rufus Henry Underwood (31 December 1863 – 8 October 1945) was an Australian politician who represented the Western Australian Legislative Assembly seat of Pilbara from 1906 until 1924. Initially active in the Labor Party and a minister without portfolio in the Scaddan Ministry, he left the party during the conscription crisis in 1917 and thereafter represented the National Labor Party for the rest of his political career.

== Biography ==
Underwood was born in Mount Egerton, a mining district not far from Ballarat, Victoria, to William Underwood, a splitter and farmer, and Jane (née Carter). He had very little education and worked in the country. In 1880, he was apprenticed to the bootmaking trade in Victoria, before moving to South Australia where by the mid-1880s he had become president of the Bootmaker's Union. On 27 September 1886 at St Patrick's Church in Adelaide, he married Bridget Fitzpatrick, with whom he was to have two sons.

In 1895, he relocated to Western Australia and engaged in gold mining with a share in a mine at Nullagine in the East Pilbara region, before moving to Tammin and engaging in farming. He joined the Labor Party and won the Legislative Assembly seat of Pilbara at a by-election on 23 July 1906 following the resignation of Independent member James Isdell.

As Parliament was considering an act to establish the University of Western Australia in 1911 Underwood asserted that universities bred snobs and drones and that it was easier for a porcupine to walk backwards down a canvas hose than for a university man to achieve anything worthwhile.

In the 1911 state election, Labor won majority government for the first time under John Scaddan. Underwood served as a Minister without Portfolio in the Scaddan Ministry from 23 November 1914 until the Ministry was defeated by a vote of no confidence on 27 July 1916.

In March 1917, some Labor members of parliament, including Underwood and former premier Scaddan, to support the Nationalist Senate team for the 1917 federal election over the conscription issue. These members either left or were expelled from the Australian Labor Party and formed a new party, the National Labor Party, whose members formed part of the Nationalist coalition assembled in June 1917 with Henry Lefroy as premier. Following the election, on 23 November 1917, Underwood was made a Minister without Portfolio in the Lefroy Ministry. He resigned on 26 March 1919 after he, Premier Lefroy and James Gardiner were stranded in Melbourne for several weeks due to quarantine regulations relating to the influenza epidemic.

He continued to serve as a backbencher, but was defeated by a Labor candidate at the 1924 state election. Little is known about his life after politics, although he resided in outer suburban Perth where he maintained a small farm. He died on 8 October 1945 at Sunset Home in Nedlands, and was buried in Karrakatta Cemetery.

Preceded by James Isdell	Member for Pilbara; 1906–1924	Succeeded by Alfred Lamond
