= James Isdell =

Australian politician

Member of the Legislative Assembly of Western Australia
- In office 6 March 1903 – 27 June 1906
- Preceded by: Walter Kingsmill
- Succeeded by: Henry Underwood
- Constituency: Pilbara

Personal details
- Born: c. 1849 Victoria, Australia
- Died: 5 October 1919 (aged 69-70) Shenton Park, Western Australia, Australia

James Isdell (c. 1849 – 5 October 1919) was an Australian pastoralist and politician who was a member of the Legislative Assembly of Western Australia from 1903 to 1906, representing the seat of Pilbara.

Isdell was born in Victoria, and came to Western Australia in 1884. He managed a station near Roebourne for a period, and later acquired several pastoral leases of his own in the Kimberley, including Croydon Station. Isdell was elected to parliament at the 1903 Pilbara by-election, which had been caused by the resignation of Walter Kingsmill. He was re-elected at the 1904 and 1905 state elections, but resigned in June 1906, stating that it was too expensive to properly represent his constituency.

After leaving parliament, Isdell managed a mine at Nullagine for a period, and later served as a Protector of Aborigines. He was appointed "Travelling Protector" in 1907 and in this role oversaw the forced removal of mixed race children from their Indigenous parents, which he considered a moral duty, once telling his superior “I consider it a great scandal to allow any of these half-caste girls to remain with the natives.”

Isdell also authored several books on the future of the Pilbara region. He died in Perth in October 1919, having spent the last few years of his life in poverty.

== See also ==
- Isdell River, named after Isdell in 1898

Parliament of Western Australia
Preceded by Walter Kingsmill	Member for Pilbara; 1903–1906	Succeeded by Henry Underwood
