= Electoral district of Ashburton =

Former electoral district in Western Australia

Ashburton Western Australia—Legislative Assembly
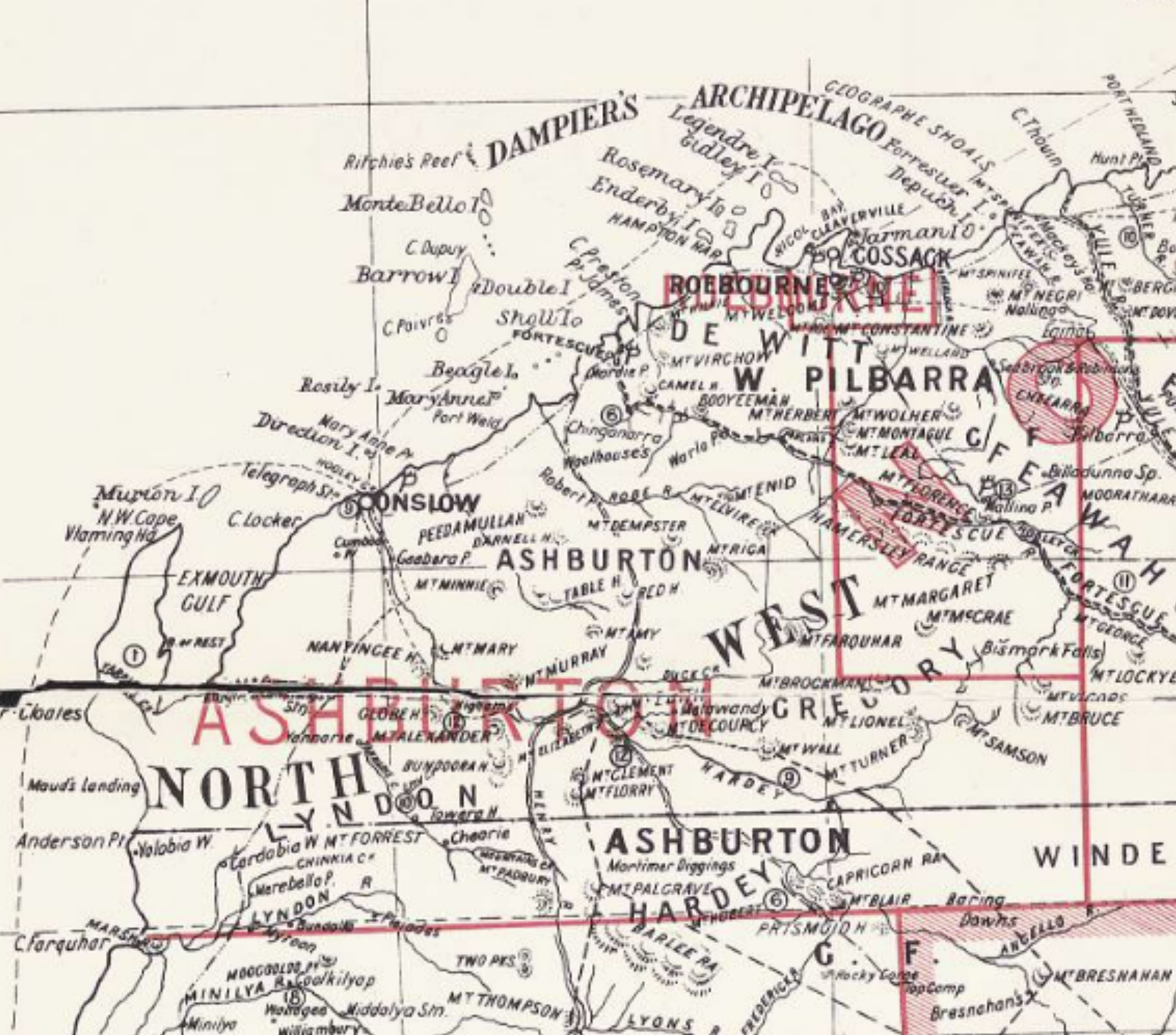
- Ashburton and surrounds in 1898
- State: Western Australia
- Dates current: 1890–1901; 1989–1996
- Namesake: Shire of Ashburton

Ashburton was an electoral district of the Legislative Assembly in the Australian state of Western Australia from 1890 to 1901 and again from 1989 to 1996.

The district was one of the original 30 seats contested at the 1890 election. It was located in the remote north-west of the state. In 1898, the district's main settlement was the town of Onslow; it also included various pastoral leases along the Fortescue River. The seat was abolished ahead of the 1901 election.

Revived for the 1989 election, Ashburton was won by Labor candidate Pam Buchanan, previously the member for Pilbara. Buchanan, by this time an independent, resigned the seat in 1991 due to ill-health, triggering a by-election won by Labor candidate Fred Riebeling. The district was abolished ahead of the 1996 election and Riebeling shifted to the new seat of Burrup at that election.

== Members for Ashburton ==
Ashburton (1890–1901)
Member	Party	Term
Septimus Burt	Ministerial	1890–1900
David Forrest	Ministerial	1900–1901
Ashburton (1989–1996)
Member	Party	Term
Pam Buchanan	Labor	1989–1991
Pam Buchanan	Independent	1991–1992
Fred Riebeling	Labor	1992–1996
