= Kevin Michel =

Australian politician

Kevin Michel MLA

Member of the Western Australian Legislative Assembly for Pilbara
- Incumbent
- Assumed office 11 March 2017
- Preceded by: Brendon Grylls

Personal details
- Born: 26 March 1961 (age 64) Golden Rock, Tamil Nadu, India
- Party: Labor
- Website: www.kevinmichel.com.au

Kevin Joseph Jude Michel (born 26 March 1961) is an Indian-born Australian politician. He has been a Labor member of the Western Australian Legislative Assembly since the 2017 state election, representing Pilbara.

Michel was born in Golden Rock, India, and migrated to Australia in 1990. He ran an air conditioning business in Karratha before entering politics.

Michel was narrowly re-elected in the 2025 Western Australian state election.

Western Australian Legislative Assembly
Preceded by Brendon Grylls	Member for Pilbara; 2017–present	Incumbent
