= David Forrest (Australian politician) =

Australian politician (1852–1917)

David Forrest (2 January 1852 – 5 January 1917) was an Australian politician, a member of the Western Australian Legislative Assembly from 1900 to 1901, holding the seat of Ashburton. He was the younger brother of Sir John Forrest and Alexander Forrest, and the great-grandfather of Andrew Forrest.

Forrest was the sixth child of William and Margaret Forrest. He was born at his parents' flour mill on Preston River at Picton, near Bunbury, Western Australia. He initially attended a one-room school that his father had built on his property, then later attended Bishop Hale's school (now Hale School) in Perth.

From 1873 to 1876, Forrest worked with sheep at Cubbine station near Quairading.

In 1874, Forrest drove a mob of sheep to a new lease of land (granted to Forrest, his brothers John and Alexander, and Septimus Burt) known as Minderoo, in the Ashburton district, and subsequently became the manager of the new station.

In 1881, Forrest married Mary Parker at York, after a seven-year engagement. They had seven children, three of whom died as infants. One of his sons, Mervyn Forrest, took over the family's pastoral interests, and like his father became a member of parliament.

Forrest was the first chairman of the Ashburton Roads Board, a justice of the peace, and Member of the Legislative Assembly for the seat of Ashburton from 1900 to 1901.

Forrest retired to Claremont, and died in 1917 at his residence, "Minderoo". He was buried at Karrakatta Cemetery.
