= Alfred Lamond =

Australian politician

Member of the Legislative Assembly of Western Australia
- In office 22 April 1924 – 8 April 1933
- Preceded by: Henry Underwood
- Succeeded by: Frank Welsh
- Constituency: Pilbara

Personal details
- Born: 25 May 1886 near Apsley, Victoria, Australia
- Died: 10 March 1967 (aged 80) Perth, Western Australia, Australia
- Party: Labor

Alfred Lamond (25 May 1886 – 10 March 1967) was an Australian politician who was a Labor Party member of the Legislative Assembly of Western Australia from 1924 to 1933, representing the seat of Pilbara.

Lamond was born in Wytwarrone, a rural locality near Apsley, Victoria, to Margaret (née Barnes) and Angus Lamond. He came to Western Australia in 1905, and began working as a prospector in the Marble Bar district. He later worked as a publican (at Port Hedland) and shearer. Lamond entered parliament at the 1924 state election, winning Pilbara from Henry Underwood of the Nationalist Party. He was re-elected at the 1927 and 1930 elections, but did not contest the 1933 election. After leaving politics, Lamond again worked as a publican in Port Hedland for a period, and then was a clerk for the Public Works Department. He died in Perth in March 1967, aged 80. He had married Elsie Ann Clements in 1924, with whom he had five children.

Parliament of Western Australia
Preceded by Henry Underwood	Member for Pilbara; 1924–1933	Succeeded by Frank Welsh
