= Henry Keep (politician) =

Australian politician

Henry Francis (later used middle name of Frederick) Keep (27 January 1863 – 26 September 1905) was a Member of the Western Australian Legislative Assembly from 1894 to 1897.

Henry Francis Keep was born at Wollaston on 27 January 1863, son of Adam Corrie Keep, a farmer who won prizes as a sheep breeder and was chairman of the Wollaston school board, and Eliza, née Williams. Around 1890 he emigrated to Western Australia, establishing himself as a shipping agent at Cossack. Around 1893 he moved to Fremantle where he was agent for the Adelaide Steamship Company until 1897.

On 26 June 1894, Keep was elected to the seat of Pilbara in the Western Australian Legislative Assembly as a supporter of John Forrest. He held the seat until the election of 17 May 1897, which he did not contest. From around 1897 he was acting resident magistrate at Roebourne, and in 1899 he was working as a stockbroker at Perth. From 1901 to 1902 he was secretary of the Fremantle Club, and thereafter worked as a commission agent in Perth until his death. He died, unmarried, at St. Omer's Hospital in North Perth on 26 September 1905, and was buried at Karrakatta Cemetery.
