= Electoral district of Burrup =

Former electoral district in Western Australia

Burrup Western Australia—Legislative Assembly
- State: Western Australia
- Dates current: 1996–2005
- Namesake: Burrup Peninsula
- Area: 64,021 km^{2} (24,718.6 sq mi)

Burrup was an electoral district of the Legislative Assembly in the Australian state of Western Australia from 1996 to 2005.

The district was based in the rural north-west of Western Australia. Its population centres included Dampier, Karratha, Roebourne, Pannawonica, Paraburdoo, Tom Price, Wickham and Wittenoom.

== History ==
Burrup was first created for the 1996 state election and was abolished ahead of the 2005 state election. At its abolition, most of Burrup's territory was incorporated into the new district of North West Coastal, with the rest added to Central Kimberley-Pilbara.

Burrup was represented by Labor MP Fred Riebeling for its entire two terms. Prior to that, Riebeling had been the member for Ashburton. Subsequent to Burrup's abolition, he contested and won the seat of North West Coastal.

== Members for Burrup ==
Member	Party	Term
Fred Riebeling	Labor	1996–2005
