= Fred Riebeling =

Australian politician

The Honourable Fred Riebeling AM

27th Speaker of the Western Australian Legislative Assembly
- In office 1 May 2001 – 6 September 2008
- Preceded by: George Strickland
- Succeeded by: Grant Woodhams
- Constituency: Ashburton (1992–1996); Burrup (1996–2005); North West Coastal (2005–2008)

Personal details
- Born: 29 January 1953 (age 73) Bridgetown Western Australia
- Party: Labor Party
- Spouse: Colleen
- Profession: Registrar

Fredrick Riebeling AM (born 29 January 1953) is an Australian politician. He was a Labor member of the Western Australian Legislative Assembly from 1992 to 2008.

== Early life ==
Riebeling was born in Bridgetown and moved to Perth as a young child. Prior to entering parliament, he had a career with the Crown Law Department.

== Career ==
Before becoming a member of parliament, Riebeling was a Roebourne shire president. He represented the electorate of Ashburton until it was abolished in 1994 and became part of the electorate of Burrup, which itself was later abolished in a redistribution in 2003 and became part of the electorate of North West Coastal in 2005.

Riebeling was appointed as the Speaker of the Legislative Assembly in 2001.

He retired shortly before the 2008 election and Vince Catania, the son of Balcatta MP Nick Catania, won preselection for the vacant seat and retained the seat for the Labor Party.

Riebeling is currently an elected member for the City of Mandurah after winning his 2011 WA local government election contest for a Coastal Ward seat.

In 2013, Riebeling stood against incumbent Liberal Kim Hames for the Electoral district of Dawesville in the 2013 state election, however was unsuccessful in his bid.

In 2019, he was appointed Commissioner of the Town of Port Hedland.

Riebeling was appointed a Member of the Order of Australia in the 2020 Australia Day Honours.

== Personal life ==
Riebeling is married to Colleen Riebling and has three sons.

Western Australian Legislative Assembly
Preceded by Pam Buchanan	Member for Ashburton; 1992–1996	Succeeded by Seat abolished
Preceded by Seat created	Member for Burrup; 1995–2005	Succeeded by Seat abolished
Preceded by Seat created	Member for North West Coastal; 2003–2008	Succeeded by Vince Catania
Preceded by George Strickland	Speaker of the Western Australian Legislative Assembly; 2001–2008	Succeeded by Grant Woodhams
