= Royalties for Regions =

West Australian Political party

Royalties for Regions is a political policy formulated by the National Party in 2008 which involves the redirection of Western Australian state government spending from the major population centres, particularly Perth, into the rural areas of the state. This spending would be funded by setting aside 25% of the state's mining and petroleum royalty revenue.

Following the 2008 state election, the National Party used its balance of power in the WA parliament to form government with the Liberals led by Colin Barnett, by trading Nationals support in exchange for spending guarantees under the policy.

== Main policy features ==
- 25% of all royalty payments to the state to be set aside for reinvestment into regional WA
- Funds to be held in a special investment fund (SIF), capped at AU$1 billion annually
- Disbursements from the SIF to be over and above consolidated revenue allocations for the regions
- SIF funds to be distributed on an agreed formula to:
  - Regional councils for local projects;
  - Regional projects developed and prioritised with the involvement of Regional Organisations of Councils and Regional Development Commissions;
  - Statewide projects developed and prioritised by the Regional Development Council; and
  - State Government initiatives that boost and leverage regional growth and investment,

In 2006-07, the state received royalties totalling $2.1 billion (2007-08 forecast:$2.5 billion, 2008-09:$2.7 billion). This data suggests that $675 million of annual funding could be assigned under the policy.

According to the Western Australian Department of Regional Development, Royalties for Regions delivered $3.67 billion to regional areas between December 2008 and June 2014. In 2013-14 $1.06 billion was invested.

== Responses ==
On 10 September 2008, WA's Department of Treasury and Finance issued a public statement saying that the policy could threaten the state's AAA sovereign credit rating. which would cause an increase in the cost of short-term funding. Under Treasurer Tim Marney said that the plan would cost $2.8 billion in additional expenditure over the next four years, and in the absence of offsetting changes, take the net debt to revenue ratio to around 53% by 2011-12. 47% is the financial target adopted by Treasury to maintain the rating. The state budget is currently in surplus with $203 million the forecast surplus for 2011-12.

Nationals leader Brendon Grylls stated that the ratio blowout could be avoided by reassessing major capital projects in Perth, such as the proposed $500 million museum redevelopment and the suburban rail extension to Ellenbrook which was expected to cost $850 million.

Critics of the policy have suggested that the idea of the Nationals siding the Labor Party during the 2008 state election to achieve the outcome was a betrayal of the historical conservative leanings of the party as it has previously generally formed coalitions with the Liberal Party.

In February 2014, Liberal Member for Hillarys and former Barnett Government minister Rob Johnson called for the policy to be abolished, stating: "With the unprecedented debt that we have at the moment and with it increasing every month, now is the time to make a long-overdue tough decision and tell our friends in the National Party that we can no longer afford to indulge them with this policy." He asserted that Royalties for Regions had "significantly diminished the standing of the Liberal Party in regional WA relative to the National Party, while we also take the full hit in the city for the collateral damage in the form of various broken promises." However, fellow Liberal state MP Graham Jacobs defended the policy, stating: "Of the total mining royalties in this state, which is a levy mining companies pay for extracting the sovereign wealth of WA, it is reasonable and logical to suggest one quarter of that total stay in the regions where 25 per cent of the people live, faced with all the matters associated with the tyrannies of distance."

In April 2014, the Western Australian Economic Regulation Authority (ERA) called for Royalties for Regions be either abolished or reformed significantly, stating: "The ERA considers that Royalties for Regions results in inefficient outcomes and should either be repealed or amended to restrict regional funding to an amount determined as part of the annual budget process." Nationals WA leader Terry Redman rejected the ERA's findings, asserting his party would "die in a ditch on this issue... we do not want to go back to the dark old days when regional Western Australia was an afterthought."

A June 2014 report on Royalties for Regions by the Western Australian Auditor General found that, while the program had provided substantial infrastructure and service projects to regional Western Australia, it was unclear whether these projects were delivering their intended outcomes.

In October 2014, Premier Colin Barnett stated: "The Royalties for Regions program has had the biggest effect on regional Western Australia in our history, and I don’t think there is anything equivalent to it elsewhere in Australia.”

== See also ==
- Economy of Western Australia
- Minerals Resource Rent Tax
