= Pam Buchanan =

Australian politician

Member of the Legislative Assembly of Western Australia
- In office 19 February 1983 – 4 February 1989
- Preceded by: Brian Sodeman
- Succeeded by: Larry Graham
- Constituency: Pilbara
- In office 4 February 1989 – 3 March 1992
- Preceded by: None (new creation)
- Succeeded by: Fred Riebeling
- Constituency: Ashburton

Personal details
- Born: Pamela Ann Slocombe; 6 February 1937 Perth, Western Australia, Australia
- Died: 31 March 1992 (aged 55) Subiaco, Western Australia, Australia
- Party: Labor (to 1991); Independent (from 1991)

Pamela Ann Buchanan (née Slocombe; 6 February 1937 – 31 March 1992) was an Australian politician who was a member of the Legislative Assembly of Western Australia between 1983 and 1992. She represented the Labor Party for the majority of her time in parliament, and was a minister in the Lawrence government, but resigned to sit as an independent in 1991.

== Biography ==
Buchanan was born in Perth to Doris May (née Brittain) and Walter Scott Slocombe. She attended Perth Girls' High School, and later went on to Perth Technical College. From 1967 to 1976, she was a preschool administrator in Roebourne, in the state's north-west, where she also ran an adult education centre for Aboriginals. A member of the Labor Party from 1976, from 1980 to 1982 Buchanan was an assistant in the Karratha office of Peter Dowding, a member of the Legislative Council for North Province and also a future premier. Later president of the party's Wickham branch, she ran for the seat of Pilbara at the 1983 state election, winning with 58.77% of the vote. She replaced the retiring Liberal member, Brian Sodeman, who had held the seat since 1974. Buchanan increased her majority to 64.67% at the 1986 election, after which she was made a government whip.

At the 1989 election, Buchanan successfully transferred to the newly recreated seat of Ashburton, with her replacement in Pilbara, Larry Graham, retaining that seat for Labor. The re-elected Dowding government persisted only until February 1990, when it was replaced by the Lawrence government following Dowding's forced resignation. New premier Carmen Lawrence elevated Buchanan to the ministry as Minister for Works and Services and Minister for Regional Development. She was also made assistant minister to Lawrence in her capacity as Minister for Aboriginal Affairs. However, the regional development portfolio was abolished in December 1990, and Buchanan lost her remaining portfolios in February 1991, as part of a ministerial reshuffle prompted by an internal spill motion. Jeff Carr and Gavan Troy were also removed as ministers, with Carr consequently resigning from parliament. Buchanan herself resigned to sit as an independent on 1 February 1991, before the new ministry was sworn in four days later. She consequently became the first woman in the Parliament of Western Australia to sit as an independent. Buchanan resigned due to ill health just over a year later, in March 1992, and died at the end of that month, aged 55. She had married George Maitland Buchanan in April 1957, with whom she had two daughters. Her resignation prompted a by-election in Ashburton, which was won by the Labor candidate Fred Riebeling.

Parliament of Western Australia
Preceded by Brian Sodeman	Member for Pilbara; 1983–1989	Succeeded by Larry Graham
Preceded by seat created	Member for Ashburton; 1989–1992	Succeeded by Fred Riebeling
Political offices
Preceded by Yvonne Henderson	Minister for Works and Services; 1990–1991	Succeeded by position abolished
Preceded by Gordon Hill	Minister for Regional Development; 1990	Succeeded by position abolished
Preceded by Carmen Lawrence	Assistant Minister for Aboriginal Affairs; 1990–1991	Succeeded by Judyth Watson
