= Frank Welsh (politician) =

Australian politician (1871–1959)

- Constituency: Pilbara

Personal details
- Born: 12 April 1871 Loganholme, Queensland, Australia
- Died: 28 December 1959 (aged 88) Kalamunda, Western Australia
- Party: Nationalist Party
- Spouse: Amy Hancock
- Profession: Pastoralist

Frank Robert Welsh (12 April 1871 – 28 December 1959) was an Australian politician who represented the Western Australian Legislative Assembly seat of Pilbara from 1933 until 1939, and one of the three Legislative Council seats for North Province from 1940 until 1954. He was a member of the Nationalist Party until 1945, when the party merged into the Liberal Party.

== Biography ==
Welsh was born in Loganholme, south of Brisbane, Queensland, to William Charles Welsh, a sugar manufacture and auctioneer, and Jane (née Porter). In 1891, he moved to Western Australia, and he married Amy Hancock on 4 November 1903 at Warralong Station near Marble Bar, in which he had acquired an interest and later became a managing partner. They had two sons and a daughter.

At the 1933 state election, he contested the Labor-held seat of Pilbara, whose member Alfred Lamond had retired after three terms. He won the seat on a 12% swing—despite his party being reduced to a minor party on the floor of Parliament at the same election. He won on a slightly increased margin in 1936, before being defeated in 1939 by Bill Hegney of the Labor Party.

He then stood for and won a North Province seat at the 1940 periodic elections for the Legislative Council, which he held for 14 years.

He died on 28 December 1959 in Kalamunda, and was buried in Karrakatta Cemetery.

Parliament of Western Australia
Preceded by Alfred Lamond	Member for Pilbara; 1933–1939	Succeeded by Bill Hegney
Preceded by Edward Angelo	Member for North Province; 1940–1954	Succeeded by William Willesee
