= Western Australian National Party =

Political party in Western Australia

Western Australian National Party National Party of Australia (WA) Inc
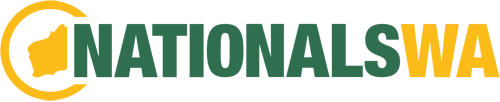
- Abbreviation: NWA; NPWA; NAT
- Leader: Shane Love
- Deputy Leader: Peter Rundle
- President: Julie Freeman
- Founded: 12 March 1913; 113 years ago
- Headquarters: 1 Graylands Road, Claremont, Western Australia 6010
- Youth wing: Young Nationals
- Ideology: Agrarianism; Agrarian populism; Conservatism (Australian)
- Political position: Centre-right
- National affiliation: National
- Colours: Green and yellow
- Slogan: For Regional WA
- Legislative Assembly: 6 / 59
- Legislative Council: 2 / 36
- House of Representatives: 0 / 15 (WA seats)
- Senate: 0 / 12 (WA seats)

Website
- nationalswa.com

The Western Australian National Party, officially known as the National Party of Australia (WA) Inc, and branded as Nationals WA, is a political party in Western Australia. It is affiliated with the National Party of Australia, but maintains a separate structure and identity. Between 2021 and 2025, the Nationals were the senior party in an opposition alliance with the WA Liberal Party in the state parliament.

Founded in 1913 as the Country Party of Western Australia to represent the interests of farmers and pastoralists, it was the first agrarian party in Australia to contest and win seats at the 1914 state election. Since then, it has continuously held seats in the state's Legislative Assembly and Legislative Council, particularly in the state's Wheatbelt region, and for many years, it also held federal seats.

While the party had historically functioned as part of a two-party coalition with the centre-right Liberal Party (and its predecessors) for most of its existence, tensions have existed over the coalition arrangement, and on two occasions, the party split over the issue. Since the passage of reforms to the electoral system initiated by the Labor Party reducing the number of non-metropolitan seats, the Nationals have re-fashioned themselves as an independent third party in Western Australian politics, in an effort to ensure their survival and continued representation for agrarian interests in Parliament.

Prior to the 2021 election, the National Party was sitting on the crossbench, and the Liberal Party was the sole opposition party. The election resulted in the National Party winning more seats than the Liberal Party, and gaining official opposition status. Under the opposition alliance, the National Party leader and deputy leader would be the opposition leader and deputy opposition leader, respectively, the first since 1947, and each party would maintain their independence from each other. The party lost opposition status after the 2025 election.

== Name ==
The party was formally established by the Farmers' and Settlers' Association (FSA) on 12 March 1913. It was the first established branch of what was called the Country Party, predating all other state branches, including the federal party established in 1920. Despite being founded by the Farmers' and Settlers' Association (FSA), it was known as the Country Party of Western Australia. It held the name for 31 years and 142 days, changing to the "Country and Democratic League of Western Australia" (CDL) (Note: Shortened to: "Country and Democratic League".) in 1944 following its severance from the Primary Producers' Association, changing the organisations constitution. The reported changes were put into place in an effort to reject all affiliations to other political organisations from the other states, and expansion of the party's platform. However, the name proved confusing, especially after the Liberals' decision to merge into the newly formed Liberal and Country League (LCL). Subsequently the parliamentary party reverted back to its former name, Country Party, at the 1949 federal election. The organisation followed suit at its 1961 conference.

The party in 1974, which had faced considerable political challenges for decades and a steady decline, entered into a political alliance with the Democratic Labor Party, called the National Alliance. A short-lived alliance, the party left the coalition following the 1975 federal election. The party again changed names, to the National Country Party of Western Australia, and briefly left the Charles Court Government. On 1 April 1985, upon its union with the breakaway National Party, it became the National Party of Western Australia, which was formally affiliated with the National Party of Australia. As with all National parties around Australia, in late 2003 the party was rebranded as The Nationals Western Australia, although the official name has not changed.

== History ==
=== Background ===
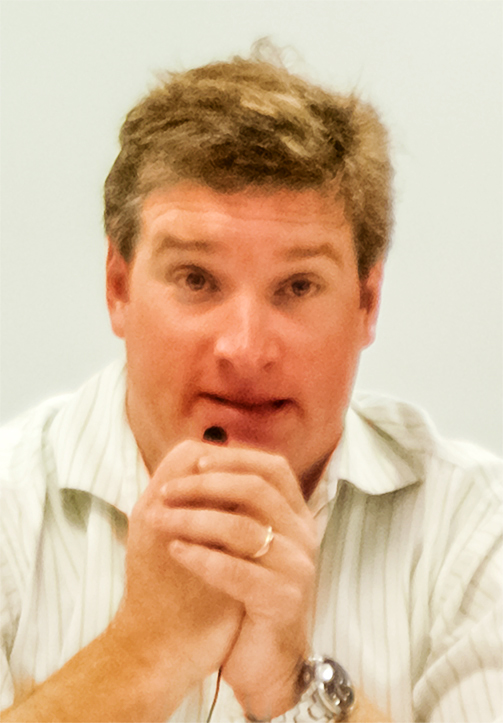
Brendon Grylls, WA Nationals leader 2005–13 and 2016–2017

The gold rush of the 1890s had seen tremendous growth in the state in terms of both capital and population. Between the discovery of gold at Halls Creek in 1885 and federation in 1901, the population increased from 35,959 to 184,124, and by 1911 had risen to 282,114—in all, an almost eightfold increase. The gold rush peaked in 1903 and, while gold still represented over 65% of the total exports of Western Australia, the industry had started to enter a period of decline. With this decline came a recognition by government that continued economic growth depended on the development of agriculture. Massive public loans from overseas together with assisted immigration from the United Kingdom saw large areas of land opened up—from 1900 to 1910, the area under crop rose from 74,308 acres (30,071 ha) to 521,862 acres (211,190 ha), while the railway network doubled in size and many public buildings were erected throughout the cultivated areas of the state. In addition, immigrants who had come in search of gold or work increasingly took on jobs as farm workers—the proportion of the population on the Goldfields had fallen from 32.2% of the State in 1901 to 22.3% by 1911, while the agricultural population had risen from 28.2% to 35.5% in the same period. Land was also given to unemployed labourers and retrenched public servants, which they could gain title on by making it productive. Following the pioneering work in 1903 by William Farrer in New South Wales on marginal-rainfall wheat varieties, wheat became by far the most important agricultural export, with the rate of expansion from 1904 to 1913 in wheat production and export surpassing all other states.

However, falling wheat prices after 1908 and a drought in 1911–1912 caused major hardship to the newly established farmers, especially in the eastern wheatbelt which had lower rainfall, less capital and less preparation. This led to some resentment towards the Liberal government then in power, and especially towards Minister for Lands James Mitchell, who had adopted a particularly enthusiastic attitude towards settlement in such areas. Two new events on the horizon brought things to a head—the 1911 state election which produced the first majority Labor government in Western Australia (including several members from agricultural areas); and an attempt by the Rural Workers Union to bring agricultural workers into the Commonwealth arbitration system to regulate their wages and working conditions. In March 1912, the Western Australian Farmers and Settlers' Association was formed to represent small employers' interests, and included primarily wheat farmers, but also small graziers, dairy farmers and orchardists. By 1914, it had 180 branches and 6,000 members, mostly located in the Wheatbelt region with some penetration of the South West region. It was inspired in part by the success of Canadian grain growers' associations from 1900 onwards.

=== Formation of the Country Party ===
At its second conference in June 1912, held at Perth Technical School, the FSA decided to adopt a political platform and elect members to Parliament who were pledged to support it. The FSA's leadership at this time was dominated by conservative established farmers, and particularly by its founding president Alexander Monger, a former member of the Liberal party. However, the association had also been highly successful in attracting Labor supporters, so the entire question of the platform was referred to a special conference held in March 1913. Strongly influenced by eastern Wheatbelt representatives, the conference was militant in tone and decided by a vote of 103 to 17 to form a country party in both State and Federal parliaments. By early 1914, the emergent Country Party of Western Australia had adopted some elements of Labor's political structure such as preselection ballots, a local branch structure, annual conferences and the observance of a pledge by party members, and saw their role as a balance of power capable of bargaining for concessions from the government of the day, clearly influenced by Labor's past practice before emerging as a major party in 1904.

These events took the Liberal party by surprise and caused some consternation amongst them. Their initial view of the FSA had been positive—federal member for Swan and former Premier (1890–1901), Sir John Forrest, believed the movement "would be of great use to the Producers, add to the strength of Liberalism and prove advantageous in every way". The FSA's first meetings were at the Liberal League's clubrooms in Perth, and its Executive was dominated by well-established families from the established farming districts around York and Beverley, epitomising the conservative values of pre-1890s Western Australian society. The Executive was staunchly opposed to the Labor party, and was concerned about the support Labor was able to attract in the newer districts, but at the same time wished for a more considered land settlement policy than the Liberals were offering, and opposed protectionism. The emergence of a three-party contest with a new Country Party remaining "entirely distinct from and not allied with any other Party" and representing the political interests of farmers, a compromise that both the Executive and the membership wholeheartedly supported, resulted in sharp criticism from key Liberals such as Forrest, who engaged in a two-month correspondence with Monger until April 1914 attempting to convince him to rejoin the FSA to the Liberal cause, and State opposition leader Frank Wilson. An invitation from the Liberal League for an exchange of preferences in the Legislative Council had been rejected by the Executive on the ground that "our constitution does not permit the council to comply with their request".

In May 1914, the Country Party won two of four contested seats in the Legislative Council—one in East Province and one in Central Province. At the Assembly elections on 21 October 1914, they contested 16 of the 50 seats in the Legislative Assembly, winning 8 of them. Five of these seats had Liberal incumbents (Beverley, Greenough, Irwin, Pingelly and York), while two had been held by Labor (Avon and Nelson). Alfred Piesse, the Liberal member for Toodyay, joined the Country Party and faced no contest for his seat. James Gardiner was selected as the first leader of the Country Party. The Labor government was returned with a one-seat majority, but could not always rely on its own members, and Gardiner told the Assembly on 8 December 1914 that there should be a "legitimate truce" and that the Country Party would support the government for the benefit of the state. During this time the government enacted a number of financial aid and other relief measures with Country Party support. However, Gardiner's willingness to work with Labor to achieve Country Party aims on the land alarmed conservatives on the FSA executive, and on 12 March 1915, at the first joint Country Party-FSA conference, the decision was made to appoint a new leader. Gardiner resigned six days later, and Francis Willmott became leader of the party, which became increasingly dominated by Monger. The party had to act carefully, as Labor had committed to an agricultural relief programme and the Executive was wary of upsetting the radical eastern wheatbelt branches. The status quo was cautiously backed at the party's August 1915 conference.

=== Coalition and division ===
Events in Western Australian politics assumed an unpredictable quality from late 1915 onwards. On 30 September 1915, the seat of Roebourne, previously held by Joseph Gardiner, was declared vacant and was won at a by-election two months later by the Liberal Party, leaving Labor with no majority in the Assembly. The FSA executive had tired of Gardiner and colleague Tom Harrison's continuing support for the government, writing in September 1915 accusing him of "always being the apologist for the bad administration of the present Government". In November, Country Party members were instructed to support a censure motion by the Liberal Party, but although all members did ultimately vote for the motion, it was defeated by the casting vote of the Speaker. On 18 December 1915, the Labor member for Williams-Narrogin, Edward Johnston, resigned from the party and was re-elected at a by-election as an Independent. For the first time since the Scaddan Government's election in 1911, non-Labor forces had a majority in the Assembly.

On 27 July 1916, the Liberal and Country parties cooperated to defeat the government in the Legislative Assembly. After being refused a dissolution of Parliament by the governor, the premier John Scaddan resigned, and Wilson became premier for the second time.

Although the Country Party cooperated with the Liberals in bringing down Scaddan's Labour government, they declined to form a coalition ministry, and they were inconsistent in their support of Wilson's government. At one point in February 1917, a dispute between the parties prompted Wilson to tender his resignation, but this was refused by the governor. During this period the Liberal Party was transformed into the Nationalist Party, mirroring changes at the federal level. After an initial minority Liberal/Nationalist ministry under Frank Wilson, on 28 June 1917 the Lefroy Ministry was formed, the first Coalition ministry in Western Australia. It combined the Nationalist Party, the Country Party and the National Labor Party (who, unlike their federal counterparts, were not subsumed into the Nationalists until 1924). The Country Party held three posts, and the Coalition would last under a succession of leaders until defeat at the 1924 election.

During the 1921–1924 term, the Country Party split into rival factions, the Ministerial Country Party (MCP) which comprised the bulk of the parliamentary party—many of whom had switched allegiance from other parties since 1919—and the Executive Country Party (ECP), which was loyal to the Primary Producers' Association, which the Country Party was intended to represent in Parliament. After the 1924 election, which significantly strengthened the latter at the expense of the former, the Ministerial arm merged with the Nationalist Party.

=== Great Depression and World War II ===
At federal level, the Country Party agreed to run a joint Senate ticket with the United Party at the 1925 federal election, allowing William Carroll to become the first Country Party senator from Western Australia. In 1928, party leader Alec Thomson announced his support of Western Australia's secession from the Australian federation. In 1930, the party adopted secession as part of its official platform.

The Coalition returned to government at the 1930 election, with new Country Party leader Charles Latham serving as Deputy Premier, but lost power again at the 1933 election. In that election the Nationalists fell to third place in the Legislative Assembly and so the Country Party leader took the post of Leader of the Opposition until 1947, with Latham serving until 1942 and then being succeeded in both posts by Arthur Watts.

=== Demographic and political challenges ===
In 1944 came a significant shift in the party's fortunes when the Primary Producers' Association, of which the Party had been the political wing, passed a motion during negotiations with the Wheatgrowers' Union deleting the rule which authorised the Party's existence and its use of PPA branches and funds for party purposes. A new organisation was hastily set up by Watts and the member for Pingelly, Harrie Seward, who were very active in setting up branches to endorse local candidates and obtaining donations on which to run the 1947 campaign. This was the start of a significant decline in the Country Party's fortunes over the ensuing decades. In 1946 the party changed its name to the "Country and Democratic League". The party's total of seats would slowly decline at successive elections from the twelve won in 1947 to eight or nine in the elections of the 1950s and 1960s until by the mid-1970s onwards the party would win a maximum of six seats.

At the 1947 election the Coalition returned to power, with the Nationalists having now become the Liberals. Although Watts had led the Coalition into the election, the Liberals won one more seat than the Nationals, resulting in Liberal leader Ross McLarty becoming premier with Watts as his deputy. The McLarty–Watts Ministry would held power until the 1953 election. During this time in March 1949, James Mann, the member for Beverley, led a breakaway faction out of the Country Party, and initially sat as an Independent. His faction merged into the Liberal and Country League, formed in March 1939, which the Liberals merged into in May 1949.

The two parties regained power at the 1959 election forming the Brand–Watts Ministry. Watts retired in 1962, to be succeeded by Crawford Nalder. The reconstituted Brand–Nalder Ministry retained power until the 1971 election.

=== The National Alliance and coalition tensions ===
The party entered into a temporary merger with the Democratic Labor Party, standing on a centrist platform as the "National Alliance" in both the March 1974 state election and the May 1974 federal election. The Alliance contested most of the state seats and every single federal seat, standing in many metropolitan seats for the first time. However, in both elections the party lost votes and seats compared to the combined performance of its component parties in previous elections, losing its last seats in the federal House of Representatives and one of two senators. The National Alliance was dissolved soon afterwards and the now-renamed National Country Party reverted to its traditional approach of contesting just rural seats afterwards. In the 1977 federal election the party's last senator, Tom Drake-Brockman, retired and his seat was lost. The party would not win another federal seat until the 2010 federal election.

The 1974 state election saw the Liberals defeat Labor but they lacked a majority and so following negotiations a Liberal-National Country Coalition ministry was formed with the National Country Party holding three positions in the ministry, including leader Ray McPharlin as Deputy Premier under Sir Charles Court. However the National Country Party's reduced position led to public discussions about establishing a clear separate identity from the Liberals. Tensions grew over rural and education issues and, ultimately, milk quotas for dairy producers leading to a split. On 20 May 1975, McPharlin led the party out of the Coalition. The state party then came under pressure from the federal party to resume the coalition, with both federal leader Doug Anthony and Queensland Premier Joh Bjelke-Petersen making visits to encourage this. In the negotiations which followed, McPharlin was replaced as leader by Dick Old and the Coalition was resumed on 31 May. However, Court insisted Old, a first-term MLA, was too inexperienced to be Deputy Premier. From this point until the Liberals' defeat in 1983, while the Coalition was maintained between the two parties, the Liberal Party got to name both leading positions in the Ministry despite Old gaining experience as a minister. At the 1977 state election the Liberals gained seats while the National Country Party stood still, resulting in the latter losing one of its three ministerial posts. The Coalition remained in office.

=== The split (1978–1985) ===
In July 1978 the tensions within the party came to the forefront once more. The schism was triggered over a political donation of $200,000 from mining entrepreneur Lang Hancock through the party president from which offers of campaign assistance were made to parliamentary officeholders to vote to oust Old. By August the party had completely fractured when Hendy Cowan, the vice president of the party and an MLA, and Jim Fletcher, the general president, walked out of a strategy planning meeting. The allegation of the campaign offer had been made against Fletcher. Court's strong domination of conservative politics had resulted in the National Country Party having only minor influence and the split galvanised demands for greater independence.

A separate party called the "National Party" was formed. The name was initially disallowed after objections from the National Party in Queensland, Victoria and Tasmania but later formalised as the National Party of Australia (WA). Disaffected members of the National Country Party joined including three Members of the Legislative Assembly, Cowan, McPharlin and Matt Stephens, and one Member of the Legislative Council, Thomas McNeil. The National Party operated as an independent force while the National Country Party remained in the Coalition. The two parties worked independently of one another while quietly (and occasionally, publicly) feuding. In the 1980 state election the National Country Party maintained the Coalition while the National Party agreed with the Labor Party not to contest each other's seats and Cowan publicly stated his party was willing to support a Labor minority government if it had the largest number of seats. The election saw each party return its three sitting MLAs, with the Coalition retaining power. On 12 May 1982, McPharlin resigned from the National Party and rejoined the National Country Party.

The Coalition lost power in the 1983 state election, in which McPharlin also lost his seat to the Liberals. All the other National Country and National MLAs retained their seats. The National Country Party was by this stage $1.25 million in debt, largely due to the failure of a grocery store it had entered to raise funds. This led to an unsuccessful motion to dissolve the party in May 1983.

There were renewed calls for the two rural parties to reunify. In August 1984 a seventeen-point plan was agreed by both parties and on 2 October 1984 the two party organisations formally unified under the name "National Party of Western Australia". However the two parliamentary parties remained as separate entities because the three sitting National Country Party MLAs (Dick Old, Bert Crane and Peter Jones) refused to work with Cowan and Stephens. On 29 January 1985 the parliamentary National Country Party was formally dissolved. The sitting MLCs joined the National party, however all three sitting MLAs refused to accept the merger and instead joined the Liberal Party.

=== The Cowan era ===
The conservative parties were in opposition through most of the 1980s with Labor yet to suffer from major fallout from the WA Inc fiasco and the 1987 stock market crash. In 1989 Liberal opposition leader Barry MacKinnon was pushing for the Nationals to help block supply in the Upper House to topple the Dowding government. Cowan refused to cooperate knowing that a small swing to the Liberals in the coming election could see them (the Liberals) gain as many as nine seats and an absolute majority in the Assembly, thus weakening the Nationals' position. In February the following year, Cowan and the Nationals had reversed their stance and decided to block supply in a bid to present themselves as a decisive and consistent conservative force.

In the 1993 state election, the conservative forces finally regained government, largely by just being able to finally present themselves as united. This was despite what should have been a relatively easy ride given Labor's problems with WA Inc. and the findings of the associated Royal commission which had been handed down the year before. The Liberals won a small, but absolute majority in both houses with the Nationals holding 6 seats in the lower house and 3 in the upper house. Nevertheless, a Liberal-National Party coalition was formed and Cowan was Deputy Premier under Richard Court from 1993 to 2001, as well as holding ministerial portfolios of Commerce and Trade (16 February 1993 to 16 February 2001), Small Business and Regional Development (10 February 1995 to 16 February 2001).

=== 21st century ===
The Coalition was defeated at the 2001 state election. Subsequently, Cowan resigned from both the party leadership and the state parliament to stand in the federal Senate election for the Nationals; however despite his profile and the party's belief that he was their best hope since Drake-Brockman's retirement, he was unsuccessful.

Cowan was succeeded as leader by Max Trenorden who led the party for the next four years in coalition with the Liberals. At the 2005 state election the Nationals retained the same number of seats but the Labor Party retained power and came close to a majority in the Legislative Council and successfully implemented the ending of a malapportionment that had given the non-metropolitan parts of the state fewer voters per electorate than in the metropolitan parts; the National Party had long benefited from this arrangement. In May 2005 legislation was passed to remove the malapportionment in the Legislative Assembly (though rural areas remain significantly overrepresented in the Legislative Council) and shift to a system of one vote one value. The change was widely expected to devastate the National Party, leading to many questioning whether it would survive the coming election.

In June 2005 Trenorden was challenged by Brendon Grylls for the leadership and stood down before a formal ballot was held. Grylls sought to reposition the Nationals, taking them beyond their traditional rural base and making a greater appeal to regional Western Australia. The party adopted the flagship policy of "Royalties for Regions", under which 25 per cent of mineral and oil royalty revenues would be spent in the regional areas of Western Australia to develop infrastructure. Grylls also moved the party away from the traditional Coalition with the Liberals. He repositioned the party as an independent force willing to form government with either the Liberals or Labor to push for National policies. In 2007, Grylls stated that the party had formally torn up the Coalition agreement, and would contest the next state election "as a stand-alone conservative party".

The 2008 state election resulted in an unexpected hung parliament. The Nationals won four lower house seats and held the balance of power in both houses of the legislature. Together with three independents, the Nationals ultimately supported the Liberals led by Colin Barnett to form an informal governing coalition after several days of negotiations. Unlike traditional non-Labor Coalition governments, however, the National members only had limited collective responsibility, and reserved "the right to exempt [themselves] from Cabinet and vote against an issue on the floor of the Parliament if it's against the wishes of the people [they] represent." Additionally, Grylls was not appointed Deputy Premier, a post that went to Liberal deputy leader Kim Hames.

The winning MLAs were party leader Brendon Grylls (Central Wheatbelt), Terry Redman (Blackwood-Stirling), Terry Waldron (Wagin) and Grant Woodhams (Moore). In the upper house, the party won five seats with the members being Mia Davies, Philip Gardiner and Max Trenorden (Agricultural Region), Colin Holt (South West Region) and Wendy Duncan (Mining and Pastoral Region). Grylls, Waldron and Redman would hold cabinet positions in the Barnett Ministry, while Duncan served as a Parliamentary Secretary.

Grylls and his partners negotiated the implementation of its Royalties for Regions policy. The policy is administered through the WA Department of Regional Development and provides for an additional $619 million (2009–10) in spending in regional communities above consolidated revenue allocations for the regions.

In the 2010 federal election, Tony Crook won the Australian House of Representatives seat of O'Connor for the National Party of Western Australia from long-term Liberal incumbent Wilson Tuckey. Crook campaigned on a policy of opposition to the Mineral Resource Rent Tax and support for a Royalties for Regions policy at a national level. He also declared his independence from the federal Nationals; indeed, the party declared during the campaign it would not take direction from federal Nationals leader Warren Truss. Although some media outlets initially claimed Crook was part of the Coalition, Crook declared he would sit as a crossbencher in the parliament. The election resulted in a four-seat deficit for both Liberals and Labor saw the first hung parliament since the 1940 federal election. Crook ultimately announced he would support the Liberal-National Coalition on confidence and supply, but would otherwise remain on the crossbench. In April 2012, however, he moved from the crossbench to sit with the Nationals. At times, Crook supported federal Labor government policies in parliament contrary to the official position of the federal Nationals. Crook retired at the 2013 federal election after a single term, and the seat of O'Connor was won by Liberal candidate Rick Wilson, who narrowly defeated Nationals WA candidate Chub Witham.

At the state level the party continued to grow in strength in the Mining and Pastoral region, having won its first elected member of the modern era there in 2008 when Wendy Duncan won a seat in the Legislative Council. In 2009 Vince Catania, the MLA for North West, defected to the Nationals in support of their regional policies. At the 2013 state election the party won seven Legislative Assembly seats in total, its largest total in over forty years, including three in the Mining and Pastoral region. Duncan successfully moved from the Legislative Council to the Legislative Assembly, winning the lower house seat of Kalgoorlie for the first time in the Nationals' history. Fellow Goldfields resident Dave Grills won a seat in the multi-member Mining and Pastoral Region upper house electorate, along with Jacqui Boydell. At that election, the Liberals won a majority in their own right, only the second time that the main non-Labor party in Western Australia had dones so since adopting the Liberal banner. However, Barnett kept the Nationals in his government. According to ABC election analyst Antony Green, Barnett would have been forced to keep the Nationals in his cabinet in any event. As mentioned above, even after the 2008 electoral reforms, the Legislative Council still has a significant rural overweighting. Green argued that this malapportionment is strong enough that a Liberal premier cannot govern without National support, even when the Liberals have enough support in the Legislative Assembly to govern alone.

In November 2013, Grylls stepped down as party leader and WA Minister for Regional Development. He was replaced in both roles by Terry Redman, while Davies was promoted to take the third Nationals' position in the Barnett Ministry. In August 2016, Grylls returned as party leader, after Redman resigned following a leadership challenge. Grylls announced a raft a new policy proposals, including an increase in an existing 25-cent per tonne production rental charge set in legacy state agreements between the state and Pilbara iron ore mining companies, BHP and Rio Tinto. Grylls lost his seat at the 2017 state election. Davies, his deputy, became acting leader until she was formally elected as leader on 21 March.

==== Opposition ====
At the 2021 election, the Nationals lost one seat in the Legislative Assembly. However, the Liberals were decimated, falling to just two seats. This allowed the Nationals to become the Opposition, making Davies the first Opposition Leader from the party since 1947. Although the Nationals were one seat short of official status in the Legislative Assembly, Premier Mark McGowan promised that the Nationals would be resourced as an opposition.

On 19 April 2021, the Liberals and Nationals formed a formal opposition alliance. The Nationals would be the senior partner, and Davies appointed three Liberals to her shadow cabinet. This was similar to the agreements between both parties when they were in government following the 2008 and 2013 elections. Under this arrangement, Liberal leader David Honey did not become Deputy Opposition Leader, deferring to Davies' deputy, Shane Love. Under the alliance, each party maintained their independence, and could speak out on issues when there was a disagreement with their partner.

On 27 January 2023, Davies announced she would resign as leader of the party, and that she would not stand for reelection for her Legislative Assembly seat in 2025.

Following the 2025 election, the party won a total of 6 seats compared to the Liberals 7, thus returning the Nationals to third party status in Western Australia.

== Party leaders ==
Leader	Date started	Date finished
James Gardiner	21 October 1914	18 March 1915
Francis Willmott	18 March 1915	August 1919
Tom Harrison	August 1919	August 1922
Henry Maley	August 1922	November 1923
Alec Thomson	15 December 1923	12 April 1930
Charles Latham	12 April 1930	8 October 1942
Arthur Watts	8 October 1942	31 January 1962
Crawford Nalder	1 February 1962	17 July 1973
Ray McPharlin	17 July 1973	18 May 1975
Dick Old	18 May 1975	30 January 1985
Hendy Cowan	25 March 1985	16 October 2001
Max Trenorden	17 October 2001	21 June 2005
Brendon Grylls	21 June 2005	19 November 2013
Terry Redman	19 November 2013	9 August 2016
Brendon Grylls	9 August 2016	11 March 2017
Mia Davies	21 March 2017	30 January 2023
Shane Love	30 January 2023	incumbent

== Electoral performance ==
=== Legislative Assembly ===
Election	Leader	Votes	%	Seats	+/–	Position	Status
As Country Party
1914	James Gardiner	13,344	13.98	8 / 50	▲8	▲3rd	Crossbench
1917	Francis Willmott	15,560	18.49	12 / 50	▲4	▲2nd	Coalition
1921	Francis Willmott	17,311	17.78	16 / 50	▲4	▼3rd	Alliance
1924	James Mitchell	Majority Country (Note: The country party split into 2 rival factions, which ran independently at this election. The majority country party wanted closer co-operation with the nationalist party, and after this election merged with the nationalist party to form the United Party.)					
1924	James Mitchell	12,600	12.83	7 / 50	▼3	▲3rd	Opposition
1924	Alec Thomson	Executive Country (Note: The country party split into 2 rival factions, which ran independently at this election. The Executive Country Party wanted further independence. This faction became the Country Party which ran at later elections.)					
1924	Alec Thomson	11,872	12.08	6 / 50	▼3	▼4th	Crossbench
1927	Alec Thomson	22,439	15.97	7 / 50	▼6	▲3rd	Opposition
1930	Alec Thomson	25,792	18.77	10 / 50	▲3	3rd	Coalition
1933	Charles Latham	25,980	14.29	11 / 50	▲1	▲2nd	Opposition
1936	Charles Latham	19,685	14.60	13 / 50	▲2	2nd	Opposition
1939	Charles Latham	24,681	12.00	12 / 50	▼1	2nd	Opposition
1943	Arthur Watts	22,251	12.41	10 / 50	▼2	2nd	Opposition
1947	Arthur Watts	26,416	16.16	12 / 50	▲2	▲3rd	Coalition
1950	Arthur Watts	20,922	9.31	9 / 50	▼3	3rd	Coalition
1953 (Note: In 1953, seven of the Country Party's nine seats were uncontested at the election.)	Arthur Watts	9,196	4.91	9 / 50	Steady	3rd	Opposition
1956	Arthur Watts	12,319	5.24	8 / 50	▼1	3rd	Opposition
1959	Arthur Watts	17,179	6.55	8 / 50	Steady	3rd	Coalition
1962	Crawford Nalder	17,339	5.93	8 / 50	Steady	3rd	Coalition
1965	Crawford Nalder	14,630	4.87	8 / 50	Steady	3rd	Coalition
1968	Crawford Nalder	16,879	5.25	9 / 51	▲1	3rd	Coalition
1971	Crawford Nalder	26,604	5.64	8 / 51	▼1	3rd	Opposition
1974 (Note: In 1974, the party combined with the Democratic Labor Party in the National Alliance which contested 44 of the 51 seats in the Assembly including many metropolitan seats. The result hence needs to be compared with the combined CP-DLP vote in 1971, which was 16.35%.)	Ray McPharlin	55,746	10.80	6 / 51	▼2	3rd	Coalition
1977	Dick Old	30,784	5.28	6 / 55	Steady	3rd	Coalition
1980	Dick Old	National Country Party (Note: The party once again split into 2 factions, which competed against each other at the 1980 and 1983 elections. After the 1983 election, the National Country party dissolved, and merged with the National party, however, all 3 MLAs chose to join the liberal party instead. The recombined National party competed together after the 1983 election.)					
1980	Dick Old	25,260	4.30	3 / 55	Steady	▲3rd	Coalition
1980	Hendy Cowan	National Party					
1980	Hendy Cowan	17,411	2.96	3 / 55	Steady	▼4th	Crossbench
1983	Dick Old	National Country Party					
1983	Dick Old	22,148	3.44	3 / 57	Steady	3rd	Opposition
1983	Hendy Cowan	National Party					
1983	Hendy Cowan	10,767	1.67	2 / 57	▼1	4th	Crossbench
As National Party
1986	Hendy Cowan	29,156	3.71	6 / 57	▲1	3rd	Crossbench
1989	Hendy Cowan	37,075	4.60	6 / 57	Steady	3rd	Crossbench
1993	Hendy Cowan	48,394	5.31	6 / 57	Steady	3rd	Coalition
1996	Hendy Cowan	55,817	5.79	6 / 57	Steady	3rd	Coalition
2001	Hendy Cowan	33,450	3.26	5 / 57	▼1	3rd	Crossbench
2005	Max Trenorden	39,548	3.69	5 / 57	Steady	3rd	Crossbench
2008	Brendon Grylls	53,086	4.87	4 / 59	▼1	3rd	Coalition
2013	Brendon Grylls	71,694	6.05	7 / 59	▲2	3rd	Coalition
2017	Brendon Grylls	71,313	5.40	5 / 59	▼2	3rd	Crossbench
2021	Mia Davies	56,448	4.00	4 / 59	▼1	▲2nd	Opposition
2025	Shane Love	78,753	5.2	6 / 59	▲2	▼3rd	Crossbench

=== House of Representatives ===
Election	Votes	%	Seats	+/–	Position
1919	7,313	7.37	1 / 5	▲1	▲3rd
1922	10,007	16.01	2 / 5	▲2	3rd
1925	46,738	27.84	2 / 5	Steady	▲2nd
1928	21,463	19.40	2 / 5	Steady	▼3rd
1929	5,684	5.38	2 / 5	Steady	3rd
1931	33,390	21.28	2 / 5	Steady	3rd
1934	55,923	31.05	2 / 5	Steady	▲2nd
1937	49,193	21.50	2 / 5	Steady	▼3rd
1940	49,416	24.39	2 / 5	Steady	3rd
1943	39,263	15.06	0 / 5	▼2	▲2nd
1946	27,689	10.22	0 / 5	Steady	▼3rd
1949	34,406	11.68	2 / 8	▲2	3rd
1951	41,933	15.59	2 / 8	Steady	3rd
1954	45,956	14.54	2 / 8	Steady	3rd
1955	Unopposed		2 / 9	Steady	3rd
1958	38,305	11.52	1 / 9	▼1	3rd
1961	21,078	5.97	1 / 9	▼1	▼4th
1963	23,564	6.29	2 / 9	▲2	▲3rd
1966	32,524	8.26	2 / 9	Steady	3rd
1969	28,413	6.38	2 / 10	Steady	3rd
1972	40,831	8.32	2 / 10	Steady	3rd
1974 (Note: Contested as National Alliance with Democratic Labor Party.)	60,325	10.71	0 / 10	▼2	3rd
1975	30,727	5.05	0 / 10	Steady	3rd
1977	25,559	4.04	0 / 10	Steady	▼4th
1980	24,752	3.63	0 / 11	Steady	4th
1983	9,685	1.33	0 / 11	Steady	4th
1984	9,817	1.31	0 / 13	Steady	4th
1987	54,871	6.90	0 / 13	Steady	▲3rd
1990	21,681	2.42	0 / 14	Steady	▼5th
1993	2,345	0.24	0 / 14	Steady	▼8th
1996	13,333	1.33	0 / 14	Steady	▲6th
1998	13,596	1.30	0 / 14	Steady	▼8th
2001	11,052	1.02	0 / 15	Steady	▼8th
2004	6,895	0.63	0 / 15	Steady	▲7th
2007	13,459	1.14	0 / 15	Steady	7th
2010	43,101	3.58	1 / 15	▲1	▲4th
2013	49,430	3.90	0 / 15	▼1	▼5th
2016	40,160	3.00	0 / 16	Steady	▲4th
2019	20,015	1.43	0 / 16	Steady	▼8th
2022	9,160	0.62	0 / 15	Steady	▼11th

== Sources ==
- Appleyard, Reg (1981). "Economic and demographic growth, 1850–1914". In Stannage, Charles Thomas (ed.). A New History of Western Australia. Nedlands: UWA Publishing. pp. 211–236. ISBN 0-85564-181-9. LCCN 82101009. OCLC 963830667. OL 3517729M. Wikidata Q125995168.
- Black, David (1981). "Party politics in turmoil". In Stannage, Charles Thomas (ed.). A New History of Western Australia. Nedlands: UWA Publishing. pp. 381–405. ISBN 0-85564-181-9. LCCN 82101009. OCLC 963830667. OL 3517729M. Wikidata Q125995168.
- Black, David (1981). "The era of Labor ascendancy". In Stannage, Charles Thomas (ed.). A New History of Western Australia. Nedlands: UWA Publishing. pp. 406–440. ISBN 0-85564-181-9. LCCN 82101009. OCLC 963830667. OL 3517729M. Wikidata Q125995168.
- Black, David; Prescott, Valerie (1997). Election statistics, Legislative Assembly of Western Australia, 1890–1996. Perth: Parliamentary History Project and Western Australian Electoral Commission. ISBN 0-7309-8409-5.
- Bolton, Geoffrey (1972). A fine country to starve in. Nedlands: UWA Press. ISBN 0-85564-061-8.
- Graham, B. D. (1966). The formation of the Australian country parties. Canberra: Australian National University.
- Layman, Lenore (1979). Pervan, Ralph; Sharman, Campbell (eds.). "The Country Party: rise and decline". Essays on Western Australian Politics. UWA Press: 159–189. ISBN 0-85564-149-5.
- Layman, Lenore; Duncan, Wendy, eds. (2014). Blood Nose Politics: A Centenary History of the Western Australian National Party 1913–2013. The Nationals WA. ISBN 9780646924236.
- Mercer, Frederick R. (1955). On farmers' service: a short history of farmers' organisation in Western Australia. Perth: Farmers Union of Western Australia.
