= McGowan ministry =

36th and 37th Western Australia government ministry

- 36th Cabinet of Western Australia
- Date formed: 16 March 2017
- Date dissolved: 8 June 2023

People and organisations
- Monarch: Elizabeth II
- Governor: Kerry Sanderson (until 2018); Kim Beazley (from 2018)
- Premier: Mark McGowan
- Deputy premier: Roger Cook
- No. of ministers: 17
- Member party: Labor
- Status in legislature: Majority Labor Government
- Opposition party: Liberal
- Opposition leader: Colin Barnett (2017); Mike Nahan (2017–2019); Liza Harvey (2019–2020); Zak Kirkup (2020–2021); Mia Davies (2021–2023); Shane Love (2023)

History
- Election: 2017 Western Australian state election
- Predecessor: Barnett ministry
- Successor: Cook ministry

The McGowan ministry was the 36th and 37th ministry of the Government of Western Australia. Led by the Premier Mark McGowan and Deputy Premier Roger Cook, it succeeded the Barnett ministry following the 2017 election.

Governor Kerry Sanderson designated 17 principal executive offices of the Government under section 43(2) of the Constitution Acts Amendment Act 1899.

== First ministry ==
Office	Minister
Premier; Minister for Public Sector Management; Minister for State Development, Jobs and Trade; Minister for Federal-State Relations	Mark McGowan, MLA
Deputy Premier; Minister for Health; Minister for Mental Health	Roger Cook, MLA
Minister for Education and Training; Leader of the Legislative Council	Sue Ellery, MLC
Minister for the Environment; Minister for Disability Services Minister for Electoral Affairs; Deputy Leader of the Legislative Council	Stephen Dawson, MLC
Minister for Police; Minister for Road Safety	Michelle Roberts, MLA
Minister for Regional Development; Minister for Agriculture and Food Minister for Ports; Minister assisting the Minister for State Development, Jobs and Trade	Alannah MacTiernan, MLC
Minister for Emergency Services; Minister for Corrective Services	Fran Logan, MLA
Minister for Local Government; Minister for Heritage; Minister for Culture and the Arts; Leader of the House	David Templeman, MLA
Attorney-General Minister for Commerce	John Quigley, MLA
Minister for Seniors and Ageing; Minister for Volunteering; Minister for Sport and Recreation	Mick Murray, MLA
Treasurer; Minister for Finance; Minister for Lands; Minister for Aboriginal Affairs	Ben Wyatt, MLA
Minister for Tourism; Minister for Racing and Gaming; Minister for Small Business; Minister for Defence Issues; Minister for Citizenship and Multicultural Interests	Paul Papalia, MLA
Minister for Energy; Minister for Industrial Relations; Minister for Mines and Petroleum (from 22 March 2017)	Bill Johnston, MLA
Minister for Transport; Minister for Planning	Rita Saffioti, MLA
Minister for Housing (from 22 March 2017); Minister for Veterans Issues; Minister for Fisheries Minister for Asian Engagement	Peter Tinley, MLA
Minister for Child Protection; Minister for Women's Interests; Minister for Prevention of Family and Domestic Violence; Minister for Community Services	Simone McGurk, MLA
Minister for Water; Minister for Forestry; Minister for Innovation and ICT; Minister for Science Minister for Youth	Dave Kelly, MLA

== Second ministry ==
Office	Minister	Image
Premier; Treasurer; Minister for Public Sector Management; Minister for Federal-State Relations	Mark McGowan, MLA	
Deputy Premier; Minister for Health (19 March 2021 – 21 December 2021); Minister for Medical Research (19 March 2021 – 21 December 2021); Minister for State Development, Jobs and Trade; Minister for Science; Minister for Tourism (21 December 2021 – 8 June 2023); Minister for Commerce (21 December 2021 – 8 June 2023)	Roger Cook, MLA	
Minister for Education and Training; Leader of the Legislative Council	Sue Ellery, MLC	
Minister for Mental Health (19 March 2021 – 21 December 2021); Minister for Aboriginal Affairs (19 March 2021 – 21 December 2021); Minister for Industrial Relations (19 March 2021 – 21 December 2021); Minister for Emergency Services (21 December 2021 – 8 June 2023); Minister for Innovation and ICT (21 December 2021 – 8 June 2023); Minister for Medical Research (21 December 2021 – 8 June 2023); Minister for Volunteering (21 December 2021 – 8 June 2023); Deputy Leader in the Legislative Council	Stephen Dawson, MLC	
Minister for Regional Development; Minister for Agriculture and Food; Minister for Hydrogen Industry	Alannah MacTiernan, MLC	
Minister for Tourism (19 March 2021 – 21 December 2021); Minister for Heritage; Minister for Culture and the Arts; Minister for Sport and Recreation (21 December 2021 – 8 June 2023); Minister for International Education (21 December 2021 – 8 June 2023); Leader of the House	David Templeman, MLA	
Attorney-General; Minister for Electoral Affairs	John Quigley, MLA	
Minister for Police; Minister for Road Safety; Minister for Defence Industry; Minister for Veterans Issues	Paul Papalia, MLA	
Minister for Energy; Minister for Mines and Petroleum; Minister for Corrective Services; Minister for Industrial Relations (21 December 2021 – 8 June 2023)	Bill Johnston, MLA	
Minister for Transport; Minister for Planning; Minister for Ports	Rita Saffioti, MLA	
Minister for Finance; Minister for Lands (19 March 2021 – 21 December 2021); Minister for Sport and Recreation (19 March 2021 – 21 December 2021); Minister for Citizenship and Multicultural Interests; Minister for Aboriginal Affairs (21 December 2021 – 8 June 2023); Minister for Racing and Gaming (21 December 2021 – 8 June 2023)	Tony Buti, MLA	
Minister for Child Protection; Minister for Women's Interests; Minister for Prevention of Family and Domestic Violence; Minister for Community Services	Simone McGurk, MLA	
Minister for Water; Minister for Forestry; Minister for Youth	Dave Kelly, MLA	
Minister for the Environment (19 March 2021 – 21 December 2021); Minister for Climate Action (19 March 2021 – 21 December 2021); Minister for Commerce (19 March 2021 – 21 December 2021); Minister for Health (21 December 2021 – 8 June 2023); Minister for Mental Health (21 December 2021 – 8 June 2023)	Amber-Jade Sanderson, MLA	
Minister for Housing; Minister for Local Government; Minister for Lands (21 December 2021 – 8 June 2023); Minister for Homelessness (21 December 2021 – 8 June 2023)	John Carey, MLA	
Minister for Disability Services; Minister for Fisheries; Minister for Innovation and ICT (19 March 2021 – 21 December 2021); Minister for Seniors and Ageing; Minister for Small Business (21 December 2021 – 8 June 2023)	Don Punch, MLA	
Minister for Emergency Services (19 March 2021 – 21 December 2021); Minister for Racing and Gaming (19 March 2021 – 21 December 2021); Minister for Small Business (19 March 2021 – 21 December 2021); Minister for Volunteering (19 March 2021 – 21 December 2021); Minister for Environment (21 December 2021 – 8 June 2023); Minister for Climate Action (21 December 2021 – 8 June 2023)	Reece Whitby, MLA	

== Notes ==
- On 22 March 2017, five days after the ministry was sworn in, Peter Tinley relinquished the Mines and Petroleum portfolio, to allay any concerns of a conflict of interest due to a family member working in the oil and gas industry. Tinley exchanged portfolios with Bill Johnston, taking on Johnston's Housing portfolio with Johnston taking Mines and Petroleum.
- On 13 December 2018 a cabinet reshuffle occurred. Bill Johnston gained the Energy portfolio from Treasurer Ben Wyatt and relinquished the Electoral Affairs, Commerce and Asian Engagement portfolios to Stephen Dawson, John Quigley and Peter Tinley, respectively. Rita Saffioti relinquished Lands to Wyatt and Ports to Regional Development Minister Alannah MacTiernan.

Preceded by Barnett ministry	McGowan ministry 2017–2021	Succeeded by Cook ministry
