= Barnett ministry =

The Barnett Ministry was the 35th Ministry of the Government of Western Australia. It included 13 members of the Liberal Party, three members of the National Party and an independent. It was led by the Premier of Western Australia, Colin Barnett, and Deputy Premier Liza Harvey. It succeeded the Carpenter Ministry on 23 September 2008 following the 2008 election and was succeeded by the First McGowan Ministry following the Liberal Party's defeat at the 2017 election.

== First Ministry ==
The Governor, Ken Michael, designated 17 principal executive offices of the Government under section 43(2) of the Constitution Acts Amendment Act 1899. The following ministers and parliamentary secretaries were then appointed to the positions, and served until the reconstitution of the Ministry on 14 December 2010. The list below is ordered by decreasing seniority within the Cabinet, as indicated by the Government Gazette and the Hansard index. Blue entries indicate members of the Liberal Party, green entries indicate members of the National Party, and grey indicates an Independent.

Office	Minister
Premier; Minister for State Development; Treasurer (from 28 April 2010)	Colin Barnett, MLA
Deputy Premier; Minister for Health; Minister for Indigenous Affairs	Kim Hames, MLA
Minister for Mines and Petroleum; Minister for Fisheries; Minister for Electoral Affairs	Norman Moore, MLC
Minister for Regional Development; Minister for Lands; Minister assisting the Minister for State Development; Minister assisting the Minister for Transport	Brendon Grylls, MLA
Minister for Education; Minister for Tourism; Minister for Women's Interests (until 9 February 2009)	Liz Constable, MLA
Minister for Transport; Minister for Disability Services	Simon O'Brien, MLC
Treasurer; Minister for Commerce; Minister for Science and Innovation; Minister for Housing and Works	Troy Buswell, MLA (until 27 April 2010)^{[1]}
Minister for Police; Minister for Emergency Services; Minister for Road Safety	Rob Johnson, MLA
Minister for Sport and Recreation; Minister for Racing and Gaming; Minister assisting the Minister for Health	Terry Waldron, MLA
Minister for Planning; Minister for Culture and the Arts; Minister for the Environment (from 22 November 2010 to 14 December 2010); Minister for Youth (from 22 November 2010 to 14 December 2010)	John Day, MLA
Minister for Energy; Minister for Training; Minister for Workforce Development (from 17 November 2009)	Peter Collier, MLC
Attorney-General; Minister for Corrective Services	Christian Porter, MLA
Minister for Child Protection; Minister for Community Services; Minister for Seniors and Volunteering; Minister for Women's Interests (from 9 February 2009)	Robyn McSweeney, MLC
Minister for Water; Minister for Mental Health	Graham Jacobs, MLA
Minister for Local Government; Minister for Heritage; Minister for Citizenship and Multicultural Interests	John Castrilli, MLA
Minister for Agriculture and Food; Minister for Forestry; Minister assisting the Minister of Education	Terry Redman, MLA
Minister for the Environment; Minister for Youth	Donna Faragher, MLC (until 22 November 2010)
Minister for Commerce; Minister for Science and Innovation; Minister for Housing and Works	Bill Marmion, MLA (from 28 April 2010)^{[1]}
Parliamentary Secretaries	Murray Cowper, MLA; Bill Marmion, MLA (until 28 April 2010)^{[1]} Michael Mischin, MLC (from 11 August 2009); Helen Morton, MLC; Tony Simpson, MLA; Wendy Duncan, MLC; Barry House, MLC (until 27 May 2009)

^{1} On 27 April 2010, Troy Buswell resigned from the ministry following questions arising from a personal affair with Greens MP Adele Carles. The following day, Premier Colin Barnett assumed the role of Treasurer, while Buswell's remaining portfolios were transferred to Bill Marmion, who had hitherto been a parliamentary secretary.

== December 2010 reconstitution ==
On 14 December 2010, a number of changes were made to the Ministry. The most notable were the re-appointment of Troy Buswell to the Ministry as Minister for Transport and Minister for Housing and the promotion of Christian Porter to Treasurer to replace Colin Barnett. The Governor, Ken Michael, designated 17 principal executive offices of the Government under section 43(2) of the Constitution Acts Amendment Act 1899. The following ministers and parliamentary secretaries were then appointed to the positions. The list below is ordered by decreasing seniority within the Cabinet, as indicated by the Government Gazette and the Hansard index. Blue entries indicate members of the Liberal Party, green entries indicate members of the National Party, and grey indicates an Independent. Except where indicated, all ministers served until the next reconstitution on 29 June 2012.

Office	Minister
Premier; Treasurer (from 12 June 2012); Minister for State Development	Colin Barnett, MLA
Deputy Premier; Minister for Health; Minister for Tourism	Kim Hames, MLA
Minister for Mines and Petroleum; Minister for Fisheries; Minister for Electoral Affairs; Minister for Justice (from 12 June 2012)	Norman Moore, MLC
Minister for Regional Development; Minister for Lands; Minister assisting the Minister for State Development	Brendon Grylls, MLA
Treasurer; Attorney-General	Christian Porter, MLA (until 12 June 2012)
Minister for Education	Liz Constable, MLA
Minister for Finance; Minister for Commerce; Minister for Small Business	Simon O'Brien, MLC
Minister for Police; Minister for Emergency Services (until 5 December 2011); Minister for Road Safety	Rob Johnson, MLA
Minister for Sport and Recreation; Minister for Racing and Gaming	Terry Waldron, MLA
Minister for Planning; Minister for Culture and the Arts; Minister for Science and Innovation	John Day, MLA
Minister for Energy; Minister for Training and Workforce Development; Minister for Indigenous Affairs	Peter Collier, MLC
Minister for Transport; Minister for Housing; Minister for Emergency Services (from 5 December 2011)	Troy Buswell, MLA
Minister for Child Protection; Minister for Community Services; Minister for Seniors and Volunteering; Minister for Women's Interests; Minister for Youth	Robyn McSweeney, MLC
Minister for Local Government; Minister for Heritage; Minister for Citizenship and Multicultural Interests	John Castrilli, MLA
Minister for Agriculture and Food; Minister for Forestry; Minister for Corrective Services	Terry Redman, MLA
Minister for the Environment; Minister for Water	Bill Marmion, MLA
Minister for Mental Health; Minister for Disability Services	Helen Morton, MLC
Parliamentary Secretaries	Murray Cowper, MLA; Wendy Duncan, MLC; Donna Faragher, MLC; Liza Harvey, MLA; Michael Mischin, MLC; Tony Simpson, MLA

== June 2012 reconstitution ==
On 29 June 2012, the Ministry was reconstituted. This followed the retirement of Liz Constable (Education), the removal of Rob Johnson (Police; Road Safety) and the earlier resignation on 12 June of Christian Porter (Treasurer; Attorney General), whose duties had been temporarily split between Premier Colin Barnett and senior minister Norman Moore. Three new ministers were appointed from amongst the parliamentary secretary ranks, and three new secretaries were appointed to replace them. The list below is ordered by decreasing seniority within the Cabinet, as indicated by the Government Gazette and the Hansard index. Blue entries indicate members of the Liberal Party, while green entries indicate members of the National Party.

Office	Minister
Premier; Treasurer (until 7 July 2012); Minister for State Development	Colin Barnett, MLA
Deputy Premier; Minister for Health; Minister for Tourism	Kim Hames, MLA
Minister for Mines and Petroleum; Minister for Fisheries; Minister for Electoral Affairs	Norman Moore, MLC
Minister for Regional Development; Minister for Lands; Minister assisting the Minister for State Development	Brendon Grylls, MLA
Treasurer (from 7 July 2012); Minister for Transport; Minister for Housing; Minister for Emergency Services	Troy Buswell, MLA
Minister for Finance; Minister for Commerce; Minister for Small Business	Simon O'Brien, MLC
Minister for Planning; Minister for Culture and the Arts; Minister for Science and Innovation	John Day, MLA
Minister for Sport and Recreation; Minister for Racing and Gaming	Terry Waldron, MLA
Minister for Education; Minister for Energy; Minister for Indigenous Affairs	Peter Collier, MLC
Minister for Child Protection; Minister for Community Services; Minister for Seniors and Volunteering; Minister for Women's Interests; Minister for Youth	Robyn McSweeney, MLC
Minister for Local Government; Minister for Heritage; Minister for Citizenship and Multicultural Interests	John Castrilli, MLA
Minister for Agriculture and Food; Minister for Forestry	Terry Redman, MLA
Minister for the Environment; Minister for Water	Bill Marmion, MLA
Minister for Mental Health; Minister for Disability Services	Helen Morton, MLC
Attorney-General	Michael Mischin, MLC
Minister for Police; Minister for Road Safety	Liza Harvey, MLA
Minister for Training and Workforce Development; Minister for Corrective Services	Murray Cowper, MLA
Parliamentary Secretaries	Wendy Duncan, MLC; Donna Faragher, MLC; Tony Simpson, MLA; Mike Nahan, MLA; Joe Francis, MLA; Albert Jacob, MLA

== March 2013 reconstitution ==
Following the return of the government at the 2013 state election, held on 9 March, the Ministry was again reconstituted, and was sworn in on 21 March 2013. John Castrilli (Local Government; Heritage; Citizenship and Multicultural Interests) and the retiring Norman Moore (Mines and Petroleum; Fisheries; Electoral Affairs) both resigned their positions, while Simon O'Brien (Finance; Commerce; Small Business), Robyn McSweeney (Child Protection; Community Services; Seniors and Volunteering; Women's Interests; Youth), and Murray Cowper (Training and Workforce Development; Corrective Services) each lost their portfolios. Five new ministers were appointed, including four previous parliamentary secretaries, and seven new parliamentary secretaries were appointed, making eight in total. A new portfolio, that of Minister for Veterans, was created. The list below is ordered by decreasing seniority within the Cabinet, as indicated by the Government Gazette and the Hansard index. Blue entries indicate members of the Liberal Party, while green entries indicate members of the National Party.

Office	Minister
Premier; Minister for State Development; Minister for Science	Colin Barnett, MLA
Deputy Premier; Minister for Health; Minister for Tourism (until 5 August 2013); Minister for Training and Workforce Development (from 11 December 2013)	Kim Hames, MLA
Minister for Regional Development (until 11 December 2013); Minister for Lands (until 11 December 2013); Minister assisting the Minister for State Development (until 11 December 2013)	Brendon Grylls, MLA
Minister for Education; Minister for Aboriginal Affairs; Minister for Electoral Affairs	Peter Collier, MLC
Treasurer (until 17 March 2014); Minister for Transport (until 17 March 2014); Minister for Fisheries (until 11 December 2013)	Troy Buswell, MLA
Minister for Planning; Minister for Culture and the Arts	John Day, MLA
Minister for Police; Minister for Road Safety; Minister for Small Business (until 5 August 2013); Minister for Women's Interests; Minister for Tourism (from 5 August 2013)	Liza Harvey, MLA
Minister for Training and Workforce Development (until 11 December 2013); Minister for Water (until 11 December 2013); Minister for Forestry (until 11 December 2013); Minister for Regional Development (from 11 December 2013); Minister for Lands (from 11 December 2013); Minister assisting the Minister for State Development (from 11 December 2013)	Terry Redman, MLA
Minister for Mental Health; Minister for Disability Services; Minister for Child Protection	Helen Morton, MLC
Attorney-General	Michael Mischin, MLC
Minister for Mines and Petroleum; Minister for Housing; Minister for Finance (from 8 December 2014)	Bill Marmion, MLA
Minister for Sport and Recreation; Minister for Racing and Gaming	Terry Waldron, MLA
Minister for Agriculture and Food; Minister for Fisheries (from 11 December 2013)	Ken Baston, MLC
Treasurer (from 17 March 2014); Minister for Energy; Minister for Finance (to 17 March 2014); Minister for Citizenship and Multicultural Interests	Mike Nahan, MLA
Minister for Local Government; Minister for Community Services; Minister for Seniors and Volunteering; Minister for Youth	Tony Simpson, MLA
Minister for Environment; Minister for Heritage	Albert Jacob, MLA
Minister for Emergency Services; Minister for Corrective Services; Minister for Veterans; Minister for Small Business (from 5 August 2013)	Joe Francis, MLA
Minister for Water (from 11 December 2013); Minister for Forestry (from 11 December 2013)	Mia Davies, MLA
Minister for Finance (17 March 2014 – 8 December 2014); Minister for Transport (from 17 March 2014)	Dean Nalder, MLA
Parliamentary Secretaries	Donna Faragher, MLC; John McGrath, MLA; Alyssa Hayden, MLC; Jim Chown, MLC; Paul Miles, MLA; Andrea Mitchell, MLA; Mia Davies, MLA (until 11 December 2013); Colin Holt, MLC

== March 2016 reconstitution ==
In December 2015, Kim Hames announced his intention to resign as deputy leader of the Liberal Party (and thus also as deputy premier) with effect from February 2016. Liza Harvey was elected unopposed as his successor, with a resultant ministerial reshuffle that took effect from 31 March 2016. Another reshuffle took place on 22 September 2016, with the resignations of Dean Nalder and Tony Simpson. All ministers are listed in order of seniority.

Office	Minister
Premier; Minister for Tourism; Minister for Science	Colin Barnett, MLA
Deputy Premier; Minister for Police; Minister for Road Safety; Minister for Training and Workforce Development; Minister for Women's Interests	Liza Harvey, MLA
Minister for Regional Development; Minister for Lands; Minister assisting the Minister for State Development	Terry Redman, MLA
Minister for Education; Minister for Aboriginal Affairs; Minister for Electoral Affairs	Peter Collier, MLC
Minister for Health; Minister for Culture and the Arts	John Day, MLA
Treasurer; Minister for Energy; Minister for Citizenship and Multicultural Interests	Mike Nahan, MLA
Minister for State Development; Minister for Finance (to 22 September 2016); Minister for Innovation; Minister for Transport (from 22 September 2016)	Bill Marmion, MLA
Attorney-General; Minister for Commerce	Michael Mischin, MLC
Minister for Environment; Minister for Heritage	Albert Jacob, MLA
Minister for Emergency Services; Minister for Fisheries; Minister for Corrective Services; Minister for Veterans	Joe Francis, MLA
Minister for Water; Minister for Sport and Recreation; Minister for Forestry	Mia Davies, MLA
Minister for Agriculture and Food; Minister for Transport	Dean Nalder, MLA (until 17 September 2016)
Minister for Local Government; Minister for Community Services; Minister for Seniors and Volunteering; Minister for Youth	Tony Simpson, MLA (until 17 September 2016)
Minister for Housing; Minister for Racing and Gaming	Colin Holt, MLC (until 15 August 2016)
Minister for Planning; Minister for Disability Services	Donna Faragher, MLC
Minister for Mental Health; Minister for Child Protection	Andrea Mitchell, MLA
Minister for Mines and Petroleum; Minister for Small Business; Minister for Finance (from 22 September 2016)	Sean L'Estrange, MLA
Minister for Housing; Minister for Racing and Gaming	Brendon Grylls, MLA (from 15 August 2016)
Minister for Local Government; Minister for Community Services; Minister for Seniors and Volunteering; Minister for Youth	Paul Miles, MLA (from 22 September 2016)
Minister for Agriculture and Food	Mark Lewis, MLC (from 22 September 2016)

Preceded by Carpenter Ministry	Barnett Ministry; 2008-2017	Succeeded by First McGowan Ministry
