= Cook ministry (Western Australia) =

38th and 39th ministries of Western Australia

Cook Ministry
- 38th Cabinet of Western Australia
- Incumbent
- Date formed: 19 March 2025

People and organisations
- Monarch: Charles III
- Governor: Chris Dawson
- Premier: Roger Cook
- Deputy premier: Rita Saffioti
- No. of ministers: 17
- Member party: Labor
- Status in legislature: Majority Labor Government
- Opposition party: Liberal
- Opposition leader: Basil Zempilas

History
- Predecessor: Second McGowan Ministry

The Cook ministry is the 38th and 39th ministry of the Government of Western Australia. Led by Roger Cook, following the 2025 state election the second Cook ministry was sworn in on 19 March 2025, succeeding the first Cook ministry.

== First Cook ministry ==
Office	Minister	Image
Premier; Minister for State and Industry Development, Jobs and Trade; Minister for Public Sector Management; Minister for Federal-State Relations	Roger Cook MLA	
Deputy Premier; Treasurer; Minister for Transport; Minister for Tourism	Rita Saffioti MLA	
Minister for Finance; Minister for Commerce; Minister for Women's Interests	Sue Ellery MLC	
Minister for Emergency Services; Minister for Innovation and the Digital Economy; Minister for Science; Minister for Medical Research; Minister assisting the Minister for State and Industry Development, Jobs and Trade	Stephen Dawson MLC	
Minister for Culture and the Arts; Minister for Sport and Recreation; Minister for International Education; Minister for Heritage	David Templeman MLA	
Attorney-General; Minister for Electoral Affairs	John Quigley MLA	
Minister for Police; Minister for Corrective Services; Minister for Racing and Gaming; Minister for Defence Industry; Minister for Veterans Issues	Paul Papalia MLA	
Minister for Hydrogen Energy	Bill Johnston MLA	
Minister for Education; Minister for Aboriginal Affairs; Minister for Citizenship and Multicultural Interests	Tony Buti MLA	
Minister for Training and Workforce Development; Minister for Water; Minister for Industrial Relations	Simone McGurk MLA	
Minister for Health; Minister for Mental Health	Amber-Jade Sanderson MLA	
Minister for Planning; Minister for Lands; Minister for Housing; Minister for Homelessness	John Carey MLA	
Minister for Regional Development; Minister for Disability Services; Minister for Fisheries; Minister for Seniors and Ageing; Minister for Volunteering	Don Punch MLA	
Minister for Energy; Minister for Environment; Minister for Climate Change	Reece Whitby MLA	
Minister for Early Childhood Education; Minister for Child Protection; Minister for Prevention of Family and Domestic Violence; Minister for Community Services	Sabine Winton MLA	
Minister for Mines and Petroleum; Minister for Ports; Minister for Road Safety; Minister assisting the Minister for Transport	David Michael MLA	
Minister for Local Government; Minister for Youth; Minister assisting the Minister for Training and Workforce Development	Hannah Beazley MLA	
Minister for Agriculture and Food; Minister for Forestry; Minister for Small Business	Jackie Jarvis MLC	
Cabinet Secretary	Jessica Stojkovski MLA	

== Second ministry ==
The second ministry was sworn in on 19 March 2025.

Office	Minister	Image
Premier Minister for State Development, Trade and Investment Minister for Economic Diversification	Roger Cook MLA	
Deputy Premier Treasurer Minister for Transport Minister for Sport and Recreation	Rita Saffioti MLA	
Minister for Regional Development Minister for Ports Minister for Science and Innovation Minister for Medical Research Minister for the Kimberley	Stephen Dawson MLC	
Minister for Agriculture and Food Minister for Fisheries Minister for Forestry Minister for Small Business Minister for the Mid West	Jackie Jarvis MLC	
Minister for Emergency Services Minister for Corrective Services Minister for Racing and Gaming Minister for Defence Industries Minister for Veterans Issues	Paul Papalia MLA	
Attorney-General Minister for Commerce Minister for Tertiary and International Education Minister for Multicultural Interests	Tony Buti MLA	
Minister for Creative Industries Minister for Heritage Minister for Industrial Relations Minister for Aged Care and Seniors Minister for Women	Simone McGurk MLA	
Minister for Energy and Decarbonisation Minister for Manufacturing Minister for Skills and TAFE Minister for the Pilbara	Amber-Jade Sanderson MLA	
Minister for Planning and Lands Minister for Housing and Works Minister for Health Infrastructure	John Carey MLA	
Minister for Aboriginal Affairs Minister for Water Minister for Climate Resilience Minister for the South West	Don Punch MLA	
Minister for Police Minister for Road Safety Minister for Tourism Minister for Great Southern	Reece Whitby MLA	
Minister for Education Minister for Early Childhood Minister for Preventative Health Minister for the Wheatbelt	Sabine Winton MLA	Sabine Winton MLA
Minister for Mines and Petroleum Minister for Finance Minister for Electoral Affairs Minister for Goldfields-Esperance	David Michael MLA	
Minister for Local Government Minister for Disability Services Minister for Volunteering Minister for Youth Minister for the Gascoyne	Hannah Beazley MLA	
Minister for Child Protection Minister for Prevention of Family and Domestic Violence Minister assisting the Minister for Transport Minister for Peel	Jessica Stojkovski MLA	
Minister for the Environment Minister for Community Services Minister for Homelessness	Matthew Swinbourn MLC	
Minister for Health Minister for Mental Health	Meredith Hammat MLA	
Cabinet Secretary	Daniel Pastorelli MLA	

Parliament of Western Australia
Preceded by McGowan ministry	Cook ministry 2023–present	Incumbent
