= Joe Francis (politician) =

Australian politician

The Honourable Joe Francis

Member of the Legislative Assembly of Western Australia
- In office 6 September 2008 – 11 March 2017
- Preceded by: None (new seat)
- Succeeded by: Yaz Mubarakai
- Constituency: Jandakot

Personal details
- Born: 11 December 1970 (age 55) Sydney, New South Wales, Australia
- Party: Liberal

Joseph Michael Francis (born 11 December 1970) is a former Australian politician who was a Liberal Party member of the Legislative Assembly of Western Australia from 2008 to 2017, representing the seat of Jandakot. He was a minister in the Barnett government from March 2013 to March 2017, and was considered a front runner for the Liberal Party leadership until he lost his seat at the 2017 state election.

== Early life ==
Francis was born in Sydney, New South Wales, to Robyn Caroline Mitchell and Charles Henry Francis. He has one sister Janelle May Francis. His primary education was at Spiritus Sanctus Primary school at North Ryde NSW. He attended Saint Ignatius' College, Riverview, and after leaving school joined the Royal Australian Navy. He served in the navy from 1989 to 1994, and subsequently worked as a political staffer for several years. Francis moved to Western Australia in 2000, operating a small business. He re-enlisted in the navy in 2002, and served as a navigator and warfare officer with the RAN Submarine Service, initially aboard HMAS Farncomb and later as an instructor at a training centre.

== Politics ==
In 2008, Francis left the navy in order to run for parliament at the 2008 state election. He was elected to the newly created seat of Jandakot, which had been created with a notional majority for the Labor Party. In June 2012, Francis was appointed parliamentary secretary to the Minister for Finance, the Minister for Commerce, and the Minister for Small Business. After the 2013 state election, where he increased his majority in Jandakot, Francis was elevated to the ministry, becoming Minister for Emergency Services, Minister for Corrective Services, and Minister for Veterans. In August 2013, he was also made Minister for Small Business. He relinquished that position to Sean L'Estrange in a reshuffle in March 2016, but was made Minister for Fisheries instead.

After losing the seat of Jandakot at the 2017 state election, Francis was appointed general manager of Australian Transit Group. In 2019, he was appointed to the Administrative Appeals Tribunal.

== Community ==
Francis was appointed (2017 - 2024) as WA Chair of Awards WA, and the representative on the National Board of the Duke of Edinburgh's International Award - Australia

== See also ==
- Barnett Ministry

Parliament of Western Australia
New seat	Member for Jandakot; 2008–2017	Succeeded by Yaz Mubarakai
Political offices
Preceded by Troy Buswell	Minister for Emergency Services; 2013–2017	Succeeded by Fran Logan
Preceded by Murray Cowper	Minister for Corrective Services; 2013–2017	Succeeded by Fran Logan
New creation	Minister for Veterans; 2013–2017	Succeeded by Peter Tinley
Preceded by Liza Harvey	Minister for Small Business; 2013–2016	Succeeded by Sean L'Estrange
Preceded by Ken Baston	Minister for Fisheries; 2016–2017	Succeeded by Dave Kelly
