= Minister for the Arts =

Minister for the Arts may refer to:

- Minister for the Arts (Australia)
  - Minister for the Arts (New South Wales)
  - Minister for the Arts (Northern Territory)
  - Minister for Arts (South Australia)
  - Minister for the Arts (Victoria)
  - Minister for the Arts (Western Australia)
- Minister for the Arts (United Kingdom)

== See also ==
- Ministry of the Arts, Culture, the Civil Service and Sport (Austria)
- Minister for Arts, Sport and Tourism (and variants), now the Minister for Culture, Communications and Sport, Ireland
- Ministry of Tourism, Arts, and Culture, Malaysia
- Minister for Arts, Culture and Heritage, New Zealand
- Minister of Sports, Arts and Culture, South Africa (current)
  - Minister of Arts and Culture, South Africa (former)
