= Minister for Sport and Recreation =

Minister for Sport and Recreation may refer to:

- Minister for Sport and Recreation (New South Wales)
- Minister for Sport and Recreation (New Zealand)
- Minister for Sport and Recreation (Northern Territory)
- Minister for Sport and Recreation (Victoria)
- Minister for Sport and Recreation (Western Australia)
