= Minister for Electoral Affairs (Western Australia) =

Government minister in Western Australia

The Minister for Electoral Affairs is a position in the Cabinet of Western Australia, first created in 1990 during the Lawrence Ministry under the title Minister for Parliamentary and Electoral Reform. That title was retained until 1993, when the name Minister for Parliamentary and Electoral Affairs was adopted. The current title was adopted in 2001.

The current Minister for Electoral Affairs is John Quigley of the Labor Party, who holds the position as a member of the McGowan Ministry. The minister, who generally holds other portfolios in addition to electoral affairs, is responsible for the Western Australian Electoral Commission (WAEC), the state government agency that conducts elections and referendums in Western Australia. Western Australia is the only Australian jurisdiction to have a separate electoral affairs minister.

== List of ministers for electoral affairs ==
Six people have been appointed as Minister for Electoral Affairs or equivalent. Jim McGinty, who served in both the Gallop and Carpenter governments, held the position for the longest period, 7 years and 220 days. Norman Moore was minister in two non-consecutive governments (the Court–Cowan and Barnett governments), with a gap of more than eleven years between terms.

In the table below, members of the Legislative Council are designated "MLC". All others were members of the Legislative Assembly at the time of their service. In Western Australia, serving ministers are entitled to be styled "The Honourable", and may retain the style after three years' service in the ministry.

Order	Minister	Party	Premier	Title	Term start	Term end	Term in office
1	Geoff Gallop	Labor	Lawrence	Minister for Parliamentary and Electoral Reform	19 February 1990	16 February 1993	2 years, 363 days
2	Cheryl Edwardes	Liberal	R. Court	Minister for Parliamentary and Electoral Affairs	16 February 1993	10 February 1995	1 year, 359 days
3	Norman Moore MLC	Liberal	R. Court	Minister for Parliamentary and Electoral Affairs	10 February 1995	9 January 1997	see below
4	Doug Shave	Liberal	R. Court	Minister for Parliamentary and Electoral Affairs	9 January 1997	16 February 2001	4 years, 38 days
5	Jim McGinty	Labor	Gallop	Minister for Electoral Affairs	16 February 2001	25 January 2006	7 years, 220 days
5	Jim McGinty	Labor	Carpenter	Minister for Electoral Affairs	25 January 2006	23 September 2008	7 years, 220 days
(3)	Norman Moore MLC	Liberal	Barnett	Minister for Electoral Affairs	23 September 2008	21 March 2013	6 years, 148 days
6	Peter Collier MLC	Liberal	Barnett	Minister for Electoral Affairs	21 March 2013	16 March 2017	3 years, 360 days
7	Bill Johnston MLA	Labor	McGowan	Minister for Electoral Affairs	16 March 2017	13 December 2018	1 year, 272 days
8	Stephen Dawson MLC	Labor	McGowan	Minister for Electoral Affairs	13 December 2018	19 March 2021	2 years, 96 days
9	John Quigley MLA	Labor	McGowan	Minister for Electoral Affairs	19 March 2021	8 June 2023	4 years, 7 days
9	John Quigley MLA	Labor	Cook	Minister for Electoral Affairs	8 June 2023	incumbent	4 years, 7 days
