= Minister for Training and Workforce Development =

Minister for Training and Workforce Development is a position in the government of Western Australia, currently held by Simone McGurk of the Labor party. The position was first created after the 1933 state election, for the government of Philip Collier, but was abolished in 1943 and not re-created until 1982. It had been a distinct portfolio in most governments since then, albeit under several different names. The minister was responsible for the state government's Department of Training and Workforce Development (DTWD).

Following the WA State Election in 2017, the portfolio no longer exists. The new portfolio is now Education and Training, held by Sue Ellery.

== Titles ==
- 24 April 1933 – 23 December 1983: Minister for Employment
- 23 December 1983 – 16 March 1987: Minister for Employment and Training
- 16 March 1987 – 25 February 1988: Minister for Productivity and Employment
- 25 February 1988 – 7 September 1992: Minister for Employment and Training
- 7 September 1992 – 16 February 1993: Minister for Employment and Minister for Training (two ministers)
- 16 February 1993 – 1 July 2001: Minister for Employment and Training
- 1 July 2001 – 17 November 2009: Minister for Training
- 17 November 2009 – 17 March 2017: Minister for Training and Workforce Development
- 17 March 2017 – 14 December 2022: Minister for Education and Training
- 14 December 2022 – present: Minister for Training

== List of ministers ==
Term start	Term end	Minister(s)	Party
24 April 1933	13 May 1936	James Kenneally	Labor
13 May 1936	18 April 1939	Albert Hawke	Labor
18 April 1939	9 December 1943	Harold Millington	Labor
1943–1982: no separate minister – responsibilities held by other ministers
30 December 1982	25 February 1983	Bill Hassell	Liberal
25 February 1983	23 December 1983	David Parker	Labor
23 December 1983	25 February 1988	Peter Dowding	Labor
25 February 1988	28 February 1989	Gordon Hill	Labor
28 February 1989	19 February 1990	Gavan Troy	Labor
1990–1991: no separate minister – responsibilities held by other ministers
5 February 1991	7 September 1992	Kay Hallahan	Labor
7 September 1992	16 February 1993	Kay Hallahan (training)	Labor
7 September 1992	16 February 1993	Carmen Lawrence (employment)	Labor
16 February 1993	9 January 1997	Norman Moore	Liberal
9 January 1997	28 July 1998	Cheryl Edwardes	Liberal
28 July 1998	22 December 1999	Graham Kierath	Liberal
22 December 1999	16 February 2001	Mike Board	Liberal
16 February 2001	14 January 2003	John Kobelke	Labor
2003–2008: no separate minister – responsibilities held by the Minister for Education and Training
23 September 2008	29 June 2012	Peter Collier	Liberal
29 June 2012	21 March 2013	Murray Cowper	Liberal
21 March 2013	11 December 2013	Terry Redman	National
11 December 2013	8 December 2014	Kim Hames	Liberal
8 December 2014	17 March 2017	Liza Harvey	Liberal
2017–2022: no separate minister – responsibilities held by the Minister for Education and Training
14 December 2022	incumbent	Simone McGurk	Labor

== See also ==
- Treasurer of Western Australia
- Minister for Education (Western Australia)
- Minister for Small Business (Western Australia)
- Minister for State Development (Western Australia)
