= Minister for Seniors and Volunteering =

Minister for Seniors and Ageing and Minister for Volunteering are positions in the government of Western Australia, currently held by Don Punch of the Labor Party. The position of "Minister for the Aged" was first created in 1984, for the government of Brian Burke; in 2005 a combined "Minister for Seniors and Volunteering". This arrangement was terminated in 2017 when they were made into separate portfolios. The ministers' portfolios fall within the state government's Department of Local Government and Communities.

== Titles ==
- 20 December 1984 – 27 February 1991: Minister for the Aged
- 27 February 1991 – 25 November 2005: Minister for Seniors
- 25 November 2005 – 17 March 2017: Minister for Seniors and Volunteering
- 17 March 2017 – 14 December 2022: Minister for Seniors and Ageing; Minister for Volunteering
- 13 March 2021 – 8 June 2023: Minister for Seniors and Ageing
- 8 June 2023 – present: Minister for Seniors and Ageing; Minister for Volunteering

== List of ministers ==
Term start	Term end	Minister(s)	Party
20 December 1984	25 February 1986	Keith Wilson	Labor
25 February 1986	12 May 1986	Ian Taylor	Labor
12 May 1986	19 February 1990	Kay Hallahan	Labor
19 February 1990	27 February 1991	Graham Edwards	Labor
27 February 1991	16 February 1993	Judyth Watson	Labor
16 February 1993	21 December 1995	Roger Nicholls	Liberal
21 December 1995	9 January 1997	Cheryl Edwardes	Liberal
9 January 1997	22 December 1999	Rhonda Parker	Liberal
22 December 1999	16 February 2001	June van de Klashorst	Liberal
6 March 2001	10 March 2005	Sheila McHale	Labor
10 March 2005	13 October 2005	Bob Kucera	Labor
13 October 2005	25 November 2005	Mark McGowan	Labor
25 November 2005	3 February 2006	Margaret Quirk	Labor
3 February 2006	8 May 2006	David Templeman	Labor
8 May 2006	9 May 2006	John D'Orazio	Labor
9 May 2006	2 March 2007	David Templeman (again)	Labor
2 March 2007	23 September 2008	Sue Ellery	Labor
23 September 2008	21 March 2013	Robyn McSweeney	Liberal
21 March 2013	20 September 2016	Tony Simpson	Liberal
22 September 2016	17 March 2017	Paul Miles	Liberal
17 March 2017	13 March 2021	Mick Murray	Labor
19 March 2021	21 December 2021	Reece Whitby	Labor
21 December 2021	incumbent	Don Punch	Labor

== See also ==
- Minister for Child Protection (Western Australia)
- Minister for Community Services (Western Australia)
- Minister for Youth (Western Australia)
