= Prison minister =

Prison minister may refer to:

- Minister of State for Prisons (UK)
- Minister for Prisons (Western Australia)

== See also ==
- Prison religion
