= Minister for Corrective Services (Western Australia) =

The Minister for Corrective Services is a position in the Cabinet of Western Australia, first created in 1983 during the Burke Ministry. The minister was known as the Minister for Prisons until 1987, but since then has been known under its current title.

The current Minister for Corrective Services is Paul Papalia of the Labor Party, who holds the position as a member of the Cook ministry. The minister, who has often held other portfolios in addition to protective services, is responsible for the state government's Department of Corrective Services (DCS), which runs the state's corrections system.

== List of ministers for corrective services ==
Seven people have been appointed as Minister for Corrective Services or Minister for Prisons, with the inaugural minister, Joe Berinson, having served for 9 years and 303 days, the longest in the position. Between 1993 and 2006, during the Court–Cowan and Gallop ministries (and during the first months of the Carpenter Ministry), responsibility for the portfolio was transferred to the Minister for Justice, with no separate corrective services minister. Prior to the portfolio's creation in 1983, responsibility for prisons had rested with either the Minister for Justice or the Attorney-General.

In the table below, members of the Legislative Council are designated "MLC". All others were members of the Legislative Assembly at the time of their service. In Western Australia, serving ministers are entitled to be styled "The Honourable", and may retain the style after three years' service in the ministry.

Order	Minister	Party	Premier	Title	Term start	Term end	Term in office
1	Joe Berinson	Labor	Burke	Minister for Prisons	19 April 1983	16 March 1987	9 years, 303 days
1	Joe Berinson	Labor	Burke	Minister for Corrective Services	16 March 1987	25 February 1988	9 years, 303 days
1	Joe Berinson	Labor	Dowding	Minister for Corrective Services	25 February 1988	19 February 1990	9 years, 303 days
1	Joe Berinson	Labor	Lawrence	Minister for Corrective Services	19 February 1990	16 February 1993	9 years, 303 days
1993–2006: no minister – responsibility for portfolio held by Minister for Justice.
2	Margaret Quirk	Labor	Carpenter	Minister for Corrective Services	26 May 2006	23 August 2008	2 years, 89 days
3	Christian Porter	Liberal	Barnett	Minister for Corrective Services	23 September 2008	14 December 2010	2 years, 113 days
4	Terry Redman	National	Barnett	Minister for Corrective Services	14 December 2010	29 June 2012	1 year, 198 days
5	Murray Cowper	Liberal	Barnett	Minister for Corrective Services	29 June 2012	21 March 2013	265 days
6	Joe Francis	Liberal	Barnett	Minister for Corrective Services	21 March 2013	17 March 2017	3 years, 361 days
7	Fran Logan	Labor	McGowan	Minister for Corrective Services	17 March 2017	13 March 2021	3 years, 361 days
8	Bill Johnston	Labor	McGowan	Minister for Corrective Services	19 March 2021	8 June 2023	2 years, 81 days
9	Paul Papalia	Labor	Cook	Minister for Corrective Services	8 June 2023	incumbent	3 years, 70 days
