= David Michael (politician) =

Australian politician

David Michael MLA

Member of the Western Australian Legislative Assembly for Balcatta
- Incumbent
- Assumed office 11 March 2017
- Preceded by: Chris Hatton

Personal details
- Born: 25 January 1980 (age 46) Mount Lawley, Western Australia
- Party: Labor
- Website: www.davidmichael.com.au

David Robert Michael (born 25 January 1980) is an Australian politician. He has been a Labor member of the Western Australian Legislative Assembly since the 2017 state election, representing Balcatta. Michael is the WA Parliament's first MP of Finnish descent, his mother emigrated to Australia from Finland with her family in 1969.

Michael worked for several state Labor MPs, and ran unsuccessfully for Churchlands in 2001. In 2005 he was elected to City of Stirling council, becoming its youngest ever member, aged 25. He served as deputy mayor from 2011 to 2013.

Michael's current priorities as MP are upgrades to Balcatta Senior High School and Osborne Park Hospital and for the McGowan Government as is the Stephenson Avenue Extension.

In March 2021, he was appointed as the Cabinet Secretary to the returned McGowan Labor Government, after having served as Government Whip since the 2017 election.

Michael also acts in the following roles for various organizations:

- Minister for Police's representative on the State Graffiti Taskforce
- Chair of the Local Government Act Review Panel
- Chair of the Stephenson Avenue Project Steering Group; and
- WA Labor's state returning officer

Michael is aligned with the Right faction of WA Labor (Progressive Labor).

As part of the Cook ministry following the appointment of Roger Cook as Premier of Western Australia, Michael was appointed to Cabinet and became Minister for Ports, Local Government, Road Safety, and the Minister assisting the Minister for Transport.

Michael was re-elected in the 2025 Western Australian state election.

== Personal life ==
Growing up in Tuart Hill, Michael went to Tuart Hill Primary School and Servite College for his education. He is a life member of the Tuart Hill Cricket Club, a board member of Tuart Hill Primary School, and a patron of the Osborne Park Bowling Club. Michael enjoys playing cricket, and he supports the Perth Wildcats, Fremantle Dockers and Claremont Tigers.

Western Australian Legislative Assembly
Preceded by Chris Hatton	Member for Balcatta; 2017–present	Incumbent
