= Minister for Child Protection (Western Australia) =

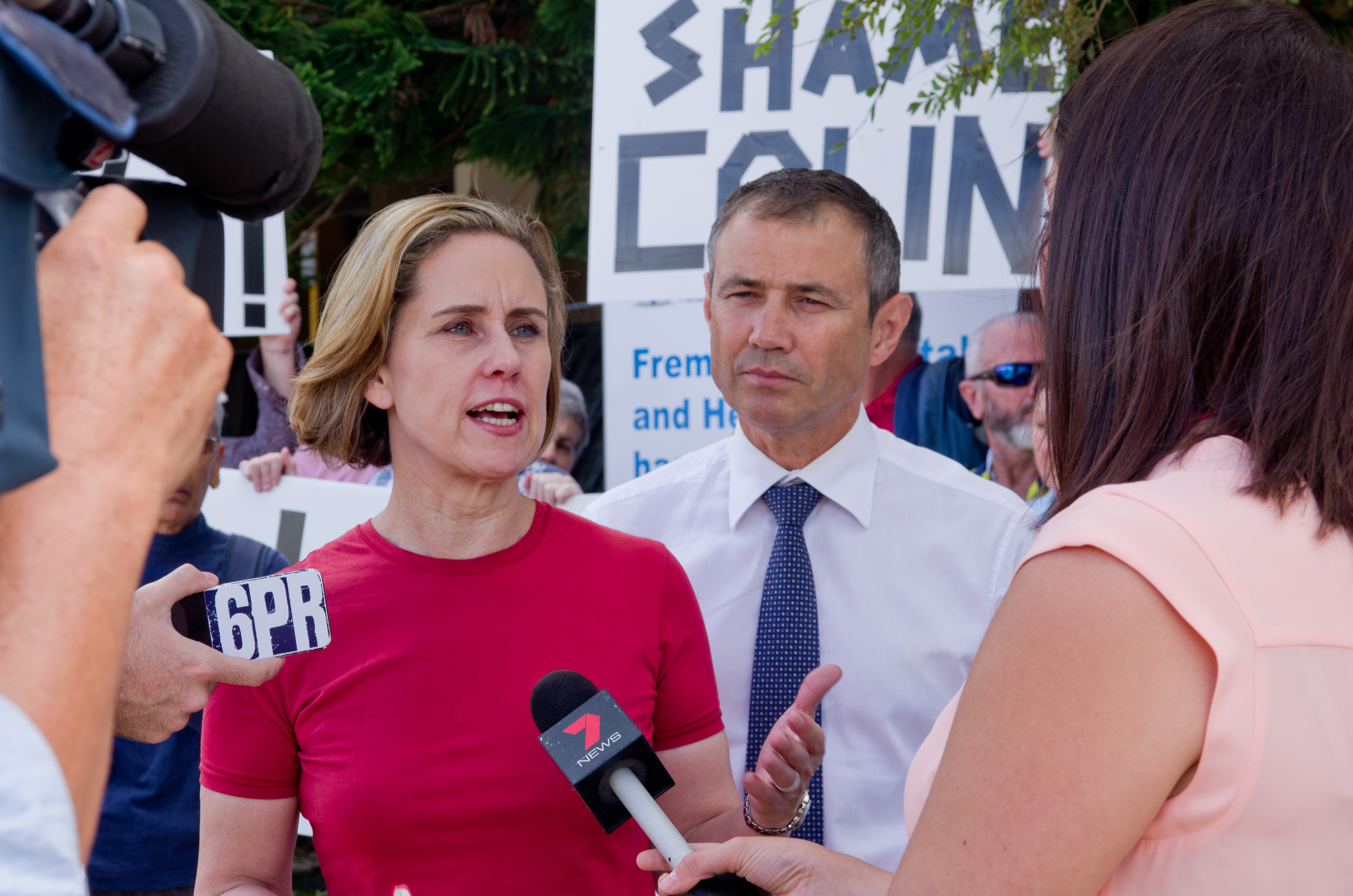
- Incumbent; Sabine Winton since 14 December 2022
- Department for Child Protection
- Style: The Honourable
- Nominator: Premier of Western Australia
- Appointer: Governor of Western Australia
- Inaugural holder: James Kenneally (as Minister for Child Welfare)
- Formation: 24 April 1933

The Minister for Child Protection is a position in the Cabinet of Western Australia, first created in 1933 during the Second Collier Ministry.

The current Minister for Child Protection is Sabine Winton of the Labor Party, who holds the position as a member of the McGowan Ministry. The minister, who has generally held other portfolios in addition to child protection, is responsible for the state government's Department for Child Protection (DCP).

== List of ministers for child protection ==
Thirteen people have been appointed as Minister for Child Protection (or equivalent), with Leslie Logan's 11 years and 335 days during the Brand–Nalder Ministry the longest period in the position. The position and corresponding department have existed under several different names, and on several occasions been abolished entirely, with responsibility for the portfolio held by what is now the Minister for Community Services.

In the table below, members of the Legislative Council are designated "MLC". All others were members of the Legislative Assembly at the time of their service. In Western Australia, serving ministers are entitled to be styled "The Honourable", and may retain the style after three years' service in the ministry.

Order	Minister	Party	Premier	Title	Term start	Term end	Term in office
1	James Kenneally	Labor	Collier	Minister for Child Welfare	24 April 1933	26 March 1936	2 years, 337 days
1936–1950: no minister – responsibilities held by other ministers.
2	Arthur Watts	Country	McLarty	Minister for Child Welfare	6 April 1950	23 February 1953	2 years, 323 days
3	Albert Hawke	Labor	Hawke	Minister for Child Welfare	23 February 1953	2 April 1959	6 years, 38 days
4	Leslie Logan MLC	Liberal	Brand	Minister for Child Welfare	2 April 1959	3 March 1971	11 years, 335 days
1971–1995: no separate minister – responsibilities held by Minister for Community Services.
5	Roger Nicholls	Liberal	R. Court	Minister for Family and Children's Services	29 June 1995	21 December 1995	175 days
6	Cheryl Edwardes	Liberal	R. Court	Minister for Family and Children's Services	21 December 1995	9 January 1997	1 year, 19 days
7	Rhonda Parker	Liberal	R. Court	Minister for Family and Children's Services	9 January 1997	22 December 1999	2 years, 347 days
8	June van de Klashorst	Liberal	R. Court	Minister for Family and Children's Services	22 December 1999	16 February 2001	1 year, 56 days
2001–2006: no separate minister – responsibilities held by Minister for Community Development.
9	David Templeman	Labor	Carpenter	Minister for Child Protection	13 December 2006	2 March 2007	79 days
10	Sue Ellery	Labor	Carpenter	Minister for Child Protection	2 March 2007	23 September 2008	1 year, 205 days
11	Robyn McSweeney MLC	Liberal	Barnett	Minister for Child Protection	23 September 2008	21 March 2013	4 years, 179 days
12	Helen Morton MLC	Liberal	Barnett	Minister for Child Protection	21 March 2013	17 March 2017	3 years, 361 days
13	Simone McGurk	Labor	McGowan	Minister for Child Protection	17 March 2017	14 December 2022	5 years, 272 days
14	Sabine Winton	Labor	McGowan	Minister for Child Protection	14 December 2022	8 June 2023	3 years, 267 days
14	Sabine Winton	Labor	Cook	Minister for Child Protection	8 June 2023	incumbent	3 years, 267 days
