= Minister for Youth (Western Australia) =

Minister for Youth is a position in the government of Western Australia, currently held by Hannah Beazley of the Labor Party. The position was first created after the 1983 state election, for the government of Brian Burke, and has existed in almost every government since then. The youth portfolio falls within the state government's Department of Local Government and Communities.

== Titles ==
- 25 February 1983 – 20 December 1984: Minister for Youth
- 20 December 1984 – 25 February 1986: Minister for Youth Affairs
- 25 February 1986 – present: Minister for Youth

== List of ministers ==
Term start	Term end	Minister(s)	Party
25 February 1983	25 February 1986	Keith Wilson	Labor
25 February 1986	28 February 1989	Kay Hallahan	Labor
28 February 1989	12 February 1990	Graham Edwards	Labor
12 February 1990	5 February 1991	Gordon Hill	Labor
1991–1995: no minister – responsibilities held by other ministers
29 June 1995	21 December 1995	Roger Nicholls	Liberal
21 December 1995	3 April 1996	Cheryl Edwardes	Liberal
3 April 1996	9 January 1997	Richard Court	Liberal
9 January 1997	16 February 2001	Mike Board	Liberal
6 March 2001	10 March 2005	Sheila McHale	Labor
10 March 2005	3 February 2006	Mark McGowan	Labor
3 February 2006	13 December 2006	David Templeman	Labor
13 December 2006	23 September 2008	Ljiljanna Ravlich	Labor
23 September 2008	22 November 2010	Donna Faragher	Liberal
22 November 2010	14 December 2010	John Day	Liberal
14 December 2010	21 March 2013	Robyn McSweeney	Liberal
21 March 2013	20 September 2016	Tony Simpson	Liberal
22 September 2016	17 March 2017	Paul Miles	Liberal
17 March 2017	20 December 2019	Peter Tinley	Labor
20 December 2019	14 December 2021	Dave Kelly	Labor
14 December 2022	8 December 2023	Simone McGurk	Labor
8 December 2023	incumbent	Hannah Beazley	Labor

== See also ==
- Minister for Child Protection (Western Australia)
- Minister for Education (Western Australia)
- Minister for Seniors and Volunteering (Western Australia)
- Minister for Youth (Australia)
  - Minister for Youth (Victoria)
  - Minister for Youth (New South Wales)
