= Sue Ellery =

Australian politician

The Honourable Sue Ellery MLC
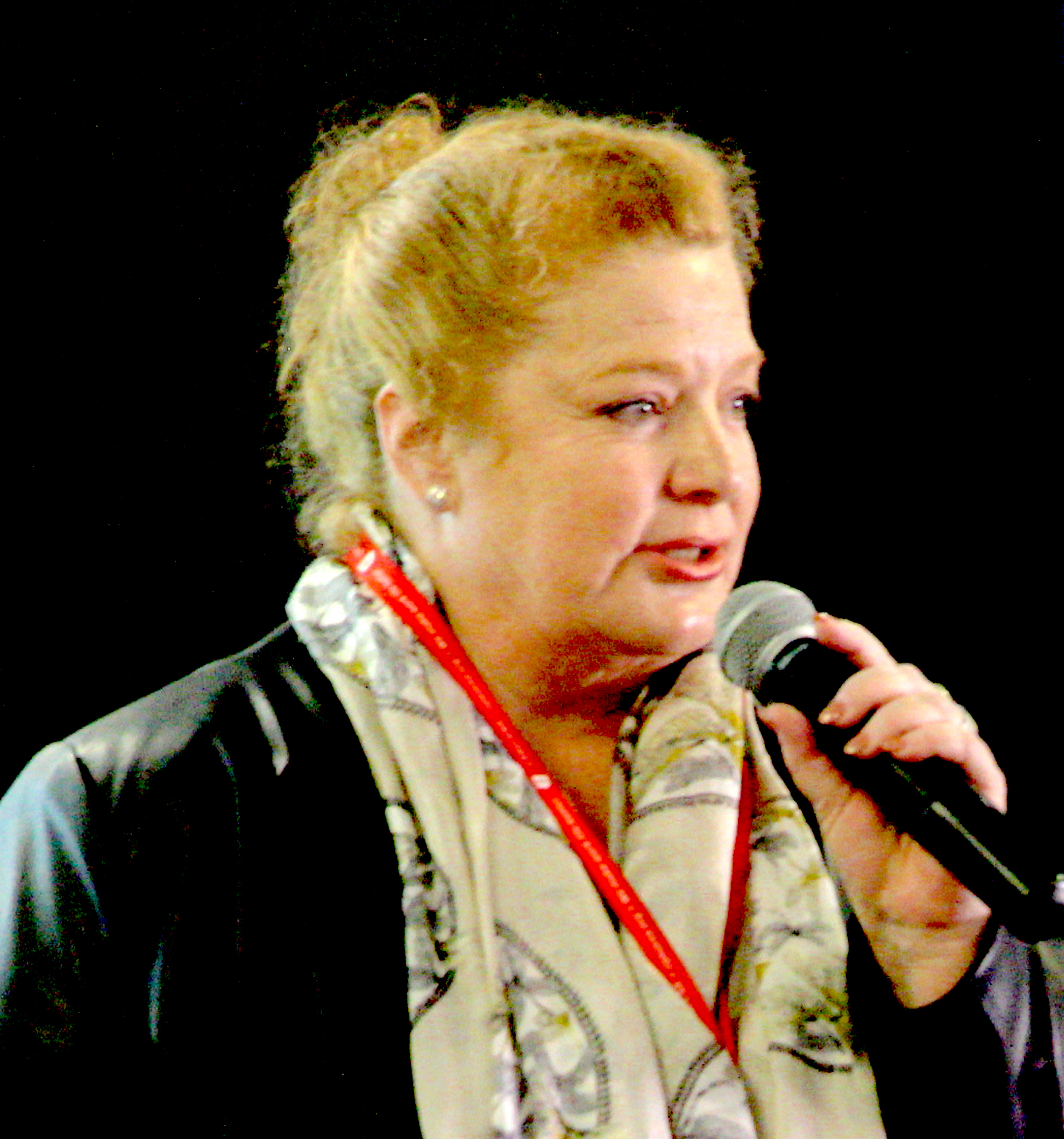

Minister for Finance
- In office 14 December 2022 – 19 March 2025
- Premier: Mark McGowan; Roger Cook
- Preceded by: Tony Buti
- Succeeded by: David Michael

Minister for Commerce
- In office 14 December 2022 – 19 March 2025
- Premier: Mark McGowan; Roger Cook
- Preceded by: Roger Cook
- Succeeded by: Tony Buti

Minister for Women's Interests
- In office 14 December 2022 – 19 March 2025
- Premier: Mark McGowan; Roger Cook
- Preceded by: Simone McGurk
- Succeeded by: Simone McGurk (as Minister for Women)

Minister for Education and Training
- In office 17 March 2017 – 14 December 2022
- Premier: Mark McGowan
- Preceded by: Peter Collier (as Minister for Education); Liza Harvey (as Minister for Training and Workforce Development)
- Succeeded by: Tony Buti (as Minister for Education); Amber-Jade Sanderson (as Minister for Skills and TAFE)

Leader of the Government in the Legislative Council
- In office 17 March 2017 – 19 March 2025
- Premier: Mark McGowan; Roger Cook
- Deputy: Stephen Dawson
- Preceded by: Peter Collier
- Succeeded by: Stephen Dawson

Leader of the Opposition in the Legislative Council
- In office 16 September 2008 – 17 March 2017

Member of the Legislative Council of Western Australia
- In office 22 May 2001 – 8 March 2025 Serving with Doust, Edman, Goiran, MacLaren, Mills, O'Brien, B. Scott, J. Scott
- Constituency: South Metropolitan Region

Personal details
- Born: Suzanne Mary Ellery; 12 May 1962 (age 64) Perth, Western Australia
- Party: Labor
- Education: University of Western Australia

Suzanne Mary Ellery (born 12 May 1962) is a former Australian politician who has been a Labor Party member of the Legislative Council of Western Australia since 2001, representing South Metropolitan Region. A senior figure in WA Labor, Ellery held a range of ministerial portfolios over two decades in Parliament. Most recently, she served as Minister for Finance, Commerce, and Women's Interests in the McGowan and Cook governments.

Ellery was previously Minister for Education and Training (2017–2022), and earlier served in the Carpenter Ministry as Minister for Child Protection, Community Services, Women's Interests, and Seniors and Volunteering (2007–2008). She retired from Cabinet following the 2025 state election and will conclude her parliamentary service with the changeover of the Legislative Council on 21 May 2025.

== Early life ==
Ellery was born in Perth to Rosemarie (née Gellard) and Peter Ellery. She attended Newman College before going on to the University of Western Australia, graduating with a Bachelor of Arts degree. She joined the Labor Party while at university, and in 1983 was the national women's officer for the Australian Union of Students. Prior to entering politics, Ellery worked in the trade union movement, including as an industrial advocate for the Liquor, Hospitality, and Miscellaneous Workers' Union.

== Politics ==
Ellery entered parliament at the 2001 state election, as the lead candidate on the Labor Party's ticket in South Metropolitan Region. She was a parliamentary secretary in the government of Geoff Gallop in 2003, and continued on when Alan Carpenter replaced Gallop as premier in January 2006. Ellery was elevated to the ministry in March 2007, becoming Minister for Child Protection, Minister for Community Services, Minister for Women's Interests, and Minister for Seniors and Volunteering. She held her positions until the Labor government's defeat at the 2008 state election. After that election, Ellery continued on as a shadow minister, and was also elected leader of the Labor Party in the Legislative Council. She has been identified as a member of the party's Labor Left faction.

From 2017 to 2022, she was the minister for education and training. In December 2022, she requested a change in ministries during a cabinet reshuffle. She became the minister for finance, minister for commerce, and minister for women's interests.

Ellery shared a close professional relationship with Premier Mark McGowan throughout his political career. During McGowan's resignation announcement on 29 May 2023, Ellery was seen wiping away tears as he delivered his remarks. Her presence at the press conference, alongside other senior cabinet ministers, reflected her long-standing role as a senior figure within the WA Labor Government and her loyalty to McGowan's leadership.

Ellery will retire from politics at the 2025 election.

== See also ==
- Women in the Western Australian Legislative Council

Parliament of Western Australia
Political offices
Preceded by David Templeman	Minister for Child Protection; 2007–2008	Succeeded by Robyn McSweeney
Preceded by David Templeman	Minister for Community Services; 2007–2008	Succeeded by Robyn McSweeney
Preceded by Margaret Quirk	Minister for Women's Interests; 2007–2008	Succeeded by Liz Constable
Preceded by David Templeman	Minister for Seniors and Volunteering; 2007–2008	Succeeded by Robyn McSweeney.
Preceded by Peter Collier	Minister for Education and Training; 2017–2022	Succeeded by Tony Buti as the Minister for Education; Simone McGurk as the Minister for Training
Preceded by Tony Buti	Minister for Finance; 2022–2025	Incumbent
Preceded by Roger Cook	Minister for Commerce; 2022–2025	Incumbent
Preceded by Simone McGurk	Minister for Women's Interests; 2022–2025	Incumbent
