= Minister for Science (Western Australia) =

Minister for Science is a position in the government of Western Australia, currently held by Stephen Dawson as part of the Cook ministry. The position was first created in 2001, in the ministry of Geoff Gallop, and has existed in every government since then. The minister is responsible for the state government's Office of Science, which falls within the Department of Premier and Cabinet.

== Titles ==
- 16 February 2001 – 3 February 2006: Minister for Science
- 3 February 2006 – 13 December 2006: Minister for Science and Innovation
- 13 December 2006 – 23 September 2008: Minister for Science
- 23 September 2008 – 21 March 2013: Minister for Science and Innovation
- 21 March 2013 – present: Minister for Science

== List of ministers ==
Term start	Term end	Minister	Party
16 February 2001	10 March 2005	Geoff Gallop	Labor
10 March 2005	3 February 2006	Judy Edwards	Labor
3 February 2006	13 December 2006	Fran Logan	Labor
13 December 2006	23 September 2008	Alan Carpenter	Labor
23 September 2008	28 April 2010	Troy Buswell	Liberal
28 April 2010	14 December 2010	Bill Marmion	Liberal
14 December 2010	21 March 2013	John Day	Liberal
21 March 2013	17 March 2017	Colin Barnett	Liberal
17 March 2017	19 March 2021	Dave Kelly	Labor
19 March 2021	8 June 2023	Roger Cook	Labor
8 June 2023	incumbent	Stephen Dawson	Labor

== See also ==
- Minister for Education (Western Australia)
- Minister for State Development (Western Australia)
