= Liza Harvey =

Australian politician (born 1966)

Liza Harvey OAM
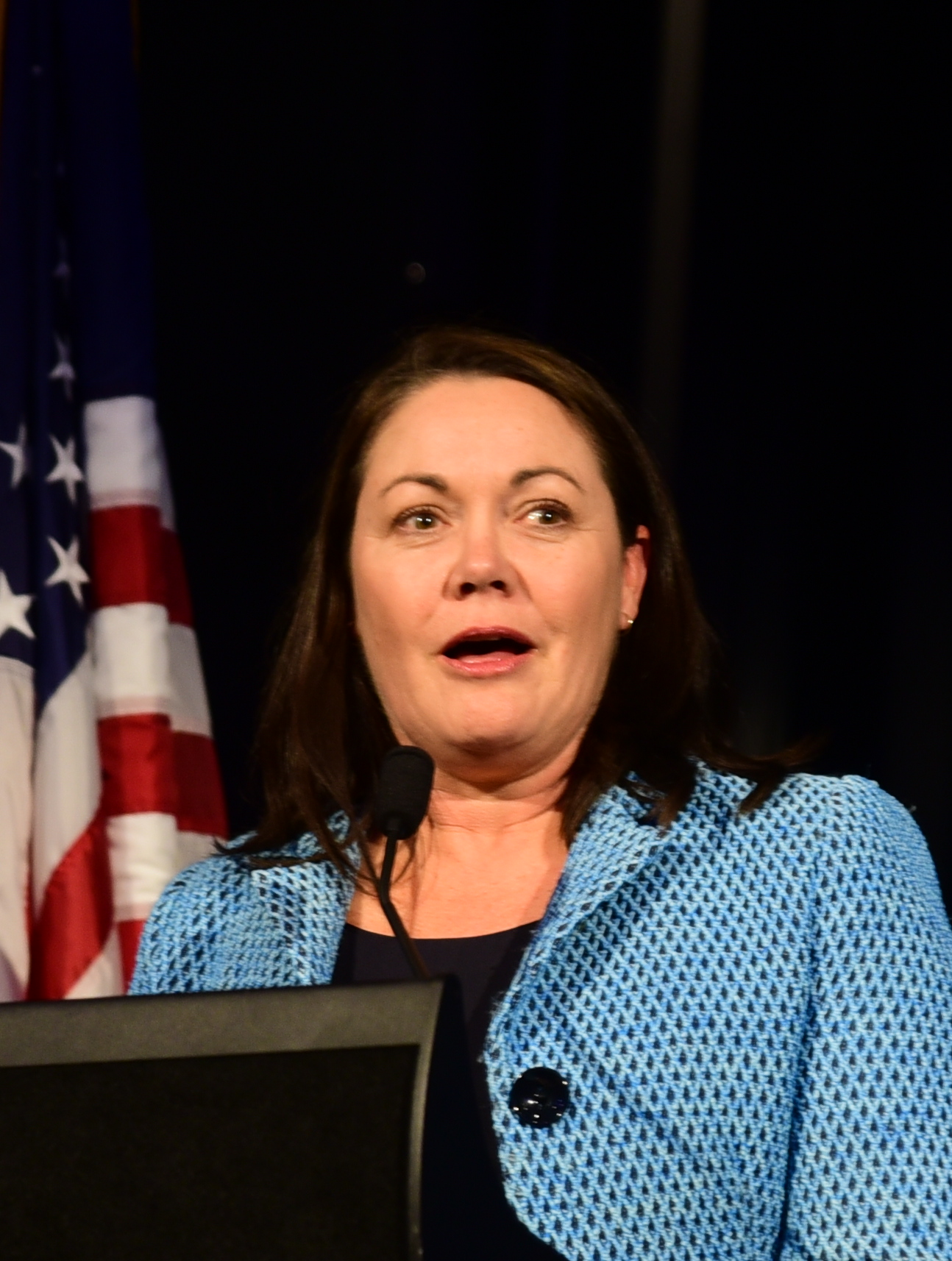

34th Leader of the Opposition in Western Australia
- In office 13 June 2019 – 24 November 2020
- Premier: Mark McGowan
- Deputy: Bill Marmion
- Preceded by: Mike Nahan
- Succeeded by: Zak Kirkup

16th Deputy Premier of Western Australia
- In office 16 February 2016 – 17 March 2017
- Premier: Colin Barnett
- Preceded by: Kim Hames
- Succeeded by: Roger Cook

Member of the Western Australian Legislative Assembly for Scarborough
- In office 6 September 2008 – 13 March 2021
- Preceded by: Constituency established
- Succeeded by: Stuart Aubrey
Party leadership positions
Leader of the Liberal Party of Western Australia
In office 13 June 2019 – 22 November 2020
Deputy	Bill Marmion
Preceded by	Mike Nahan
Succeeded by	Zak Kirkup
Deputy Leader of the Liberal Party of Western Australia
In office 16 February 2016 – 13 June 2019
Leader	Colin Barnett; Mike Nahan
Preceded by	Kim Hames
Succeeded by	Bill Marmion
Deputy Leader of the Opposition in Western Australia
In office 17 March 2017 – 13 June 2019
Leader	Colin Barnett; Mike Nahan
Preceded by	Kim Hames
Succeeded by	Bill Marmion
Ministerial offices
Minister for Police and Road Safety
In office 29 June 2012 – 17 March 2017
Premier	Colin Barnett
Preceded by	Rob Johnson
Succeeded by	Michelle Roberts
Minister for Women's Interests
In office 21 March 2013 – 17 March 2017
Premier	Colin Barnett
Preceded by	Robyn McSweeney
Succeeded by	Simone McGurk
Minister for Small Business and Tourism
In office 21 March 2013 – 8 December 2014
Premier	Colin Barnett
Preceded by	Simon O'Brien (Small Business); Colin Barnett (Tourism)
Succeeded by	Joe Francis(Small Business); Kim Hames (Tourism)
Minister for Training and Workforce Development
In office 8 December 2014 – 17 March 2017
Premier	Colin Barnett
Preceded by	Kim Hames
Succeeded by	Sue Ellery (Education and Training)

Personal details
- Born: Liza Mary Browne; 25 October 1966 (age 59) Manjimup, Western Australia, Australia
- Party: Liberal
- Spouse: Hal Harvey (m. 1996; wid. 2014)
- Education: Mercedes College
- Alma mater: University of Western Australia
- Occupation: Recreational management (Self-employed); Customer service (Qantas)
- Profession: Businesswoman; Politician

Liza Mary Harvey (née Browne; born 25 October 1966) is an Australian politician who was the Liberal Party member of the Legislative Assembly of Western Australia from 2008 to 2021, representing the seat of Scarborough. She was a minister in the government of Colin Barnett, and in 2016 was appointed deputy premier, becoming the first woman to hold the position.

Harvey became leader of the opposition after being elected unopposed to replace Mike Nahan as state Liberal leader on 13 June 2019. On 22 November 2020, she resigned as Liberal leader and was replaced by Zak Kirkup. She lost her seat at the 2021 election. She was awarded the Medal of the Order of Australia in the 2025 King's Birthday Honours.

== Early life ==
Harvey was born in Manjimup, Western Australia, to Jill Annette (née Randell) and Eugene Michael Browne. Her mother was a descendant of George Randell, an early settler of Western Australia. Harvey attended primary schools in Perth and Port Hedland, and secondary school at Mercedes College, Perth. She went on to study science at the University of Western Australia. Harvey worked for Qantas between 1989 and 2000, holding positions in customer service and at the Qantas Club. She also helped to run a recreational fishing business with her husband, and was involved with various local business associations.

== Politics ==
Harvey entered parliament at the 2008 state election. She won the newly created Scarborough (a notionally Liberal seat) with 55.2 percent of the two-party-preferred vote. In December 2010, Harvey was made parliamentary secretary to Simon O'Brien, in his capacity as the Minister for Small Business. She was elevated to the ministry in June 2012, replacing Rob Johnson as Minister for Police and Minister for Road Safety. After the 2013 state election, Harvey was additionally made Minister for Small Business and Minister for Women's Interests. In a ministerial reshuffle in August 2013, she lost the small business portfolio to Joe Francis, but was made Minister for Tourism instead. In another reshuffle in December 2014, she took over from Kim Hames as Minister for Training and Workforce Development, with Hames taking on the tourism portfolio.

In December 2015, Kim Hames announced his intention to resign as deputy leader of the Liberal Party (and to retire from parliament at the 2017 state election). Harvey was elected as his replacement unopposed in February 2016, and was sworn in as deputy premier a few days later, becoming the first woman to hold either position. In January 2017, Harvey confirmed that she would stand for the Liberal leadership once Colin Barnett retired. However, on 21 March former treasurer Mike Nahan was elected unopposed as the new leader of the party with Harvey continuing as his deputy.

=== Leader of the Opposition ===
Nahan resigned as leader on 13 June 2019, and Harvey was elected his successor unopposed. She was the first woman to be the leader of the WA Liberal Party and the second woman to serve as WA opposition leader after Carmen Lawrence.

Harvey called for WA to open its borders during the COVID-19 pandemic. She was widely criticised for that position, including by some in her own party. Due to poor opinion polling, Harvey resigned as Liberal leader on 22 November 2020 and was replaced by Zak Kirkup at the following leadership election.

At the 2021 election, Harvey lost her seat of Scarborough to Labor's Stuart Aubrey.

== Personal life ==
Harvey married her husband, Hal Lewis Harvey, in 1996. He had one daughter from a previous relationship, and they had a son and a daughter together. Her husband was diagnosed with pancreatic cancer in 2011, and died from the disease in 2014, aged 55.

== See also ==
- Women in the Western Australian Legislative Assembly

Parliament of Western Australia
New seat	Member for Scarborough; 2008–2021	Succeeded by Stuart Aubrey
Political offices
Preceded by Kim Hames	Deputy Premier of Western Australia; 2016–2017	Succeeded by Roger Cook
Preceded by Rob Johnson	Minister for Police; 2012–2017	Succeeded by Michelle Roberts
Preceded by Rob Johnson	Minister for Road Safety; 2012–2017	Succeeded by Michelle Roberts
Preceded by Simon O'Brien	Minister for Small Business; 2013	Succeeded by Joe Francis
Preceded by Robyn McSweeney	Minister for Women's Interests; 2013–2017	Succeeded by Simone McGurk
Preceded by Colin Barnett	Minister for Tourism; 2013–2014	Succeeded by Kim Hames
Preceded by Kim Hames	Minister for Training and Workforce Development; 2014–2017	Portfolio abolished
Preceded by Mike Nahan	Leader of the Opposition; 2019–2020	Succeeded by Zak Kirkup
Party political offices
Preceded by Mike Nahan	Leader of the Liberal Party in Western Australia; 2019–2020	Succeeded by Zak Kirkup
