= Minister for Women's Interests =

Western Australian government position

Minister for Women's Interests of Western Australia
- Incumbent; Sue Ellery since 14 December 2022
- Inaugural holder: Brian Burke
- Formation: 25 February 1983

Minister for Women's Interests is a position in the government of Western Australia, currently held by Sue Ellery of the Labor Party. The position was first created after the 1983 state election, for the government of Brian Burke, and has existed in every government since then. Until 1992, the position was always held by the premier (male or female), who appointed an assistant minister to administer the portfolio. The women's interests portfolio falls within the state government's Department of Local Government and Communities.

== Titles ==
- 25 February 1983 – present: Minister for Women's Interests

== List of ministers ==
Term start	Term end	Minister(s)	Party
25 February 1983	25 February 1988	Brian Burke	Labor
25 February 1988	12 February 1990	Peter Dowding	Labor
12 February 1990	7 September 1992	Carmen Lawrence	Labor
7 September 1992	16 February 1993	Judyth Watson	Labor
16 February 1993	9 January 1997	Cheryl Edwardes	Liberal
9 January 1997	22 December 1999	Rhonda Parker	Liberal
22 December 1999	16 February 2001	June van de Klashorst	Liberal
16 February 2001	3 February 2006	Sheila McHale	Labor
3 February 2006	2 March 2007	Margaret Quirk	Labor
2 March 2007	23 September 2008	Sue Ellery	Labor
23 September 2008	9 February 2009	Liz Constable	Independent
9 February 2009	21 March 2013	Robyn McSweeney	Liberal
21 March 2013	17 March 2017	Liza Harvey	Liberal
17 March 2017	14 December 2022	Simone McGurk	Labor
14 December 2022	incumbent	Sue Ellery	Labor

== List of assistant ministers ==
Term start	Term end	Minister(s)	Party
25 February 1986	5 February 1991	Kay Hallahan	Labor
5 February 1991	7 September 1992	Judyth Watson	Labor

== See also ==
- Minister for Planning (Western Australia)
