= Minister for Veterans (Western Australia) =

Minister for Veterans Issues is a position in the government of Western Australia, currently held by Paul Papalia of the Labor Party. The position was first created after the 2013 state election, for the government of Colin Barnett. The minister is responsible for the state government's Veterans Advisory Council.

For a period after World War I, in the governments of Hal Colebatch and James Mitchell, there was a Minister for Repatriation, who had broadly similar duties to the current minister.

== List of veterans ministers ==
Term start	Term end	Minister	Party
21 March 2013	17 March 2017	Joe Francis	Liberal
17 March 2017	19 March 2021	Peter Tinley	Labor
19 March 2021	incumbent	Paul Papalia	Labor

== List of repatriation ministers ==
Term start	Term end	Minister	Party
17 April 1919	15 April 1924	James Mitchell	Nationalist

== See also ==
- Minister for Community Services (Western Australia)
- Minister for Veterans' Affairs (Australia)
  - Minister for Veterans (Victoria)
  - Minister for Veterans (New South Wales)
