= Minister for Culture and the Arts (Western Australia) =

Australian ministerial position

The Minister for Culture and the Arts is a position in the Cabinet of Western Australia. It was first created in 1971, during the Tonkin government, under the title Minister for Cultural Affairs. That title was retained until 1983, when the title Minister for the Arts was adopted. The current title was adopted in 2001.

The current Minister for Culture and the Arts is David Templeman of the Labor Party, who holds the position as a member of the McGowan Ministry. The minister, who generally also holds other portfolios, is responsible for the state government's Department of Culture and the Arts.

== List of ministers for culture and the arts ==
Thirteen people have been appointed as Minister for Culture and the Arts or equivalent. Sheila McHale, who served in both the Gallop and Carpenter governments, held the position for the longest period, 7 years and 220 days. David Parker had two non-consecutive terms as minister, initially in the Burke government and then across the Dowding and Lawrence governments, although he served for just over three years.

In the table below, members of the Legislative Council are designated "MLC". All others were members of the Legislative Assembly at the time of their service. In Western Australia, serving ministers are entitled to be styled "The Honourable", and may retain the style after three years' service in the ministry.

Order	Minister	Party	Premier	Title	Term start	Term end	Term in office
1	John Tonkin	Labor	Tonkin	Minister for Cultural Affairs	3 March 1971	8 April 1974	3 years, 36 days
2	Graham MacKinnon MLC	Liberal	C. Court	Minister for Cultural Affairs	8 April 1974	10 March 1977	2 years, 336 days
3	Peter Jones	National Country	C. Court	Minister for Cultural Affairs	10 March 1977	5 March 1980	2 years, 361 days
4	Bill Grayden	Liberal	C. Court	Minister for Cultural Affairs	5 March 1980	25 January 1982	1 year, 326 days
5	Bob Pike MLC	Liberal	O'Connor	Minister for Cultural Affairs	25 January 1982	25 February 1983	1 year, 31 days
6	Ron Davies	Labor	Burke	Minister for the Arts	25 February 1983	26 February 1986	3 years, 1 day
7	David Parker	Labor	Burke	Minister for the Arts	26 February 1986	25 February 1988	see below
8	Yvonne Henderson	Labor	Dowding	Minister for the Arts	25 February 1988	28 February 1989	1 year, 3 days
(7)	David Parker	Labor	Dowding	Minister for the Arts	28 February 1989	12 February 1990	3 years, 54 days
(7)	David Parker	Labor	Lawrence	Minister for the Arts	12 February 1990	24 April 1990	3 years, 54 days
9	Kay Hallahan MLC	Labor	Lawrence	Minister for the Arts	24 April 1990	16 February 1993	2 years, 298 days
10	Peter Foss MLC	Liberal	R. Court	Minister for the Arts	16 February 1993	22 December 1999	6 years, 309 days
11	Mike Board	Liberal	R. Court	Minister for the Arts	22 December 1999	16 February 2001	1 year, 56 days
12	Sheila McHale	Labor	Gallop	Minister for Culture and the Arts	16 February 2001	25 January 2006	7 years, 220 days
12	Sheila McHale	Labor	Carpenter	Minister for Culture and the Arts	25 January 2006	23 September 2008	7 years, 220 days
13	John Day	Liberal	Barnett	Minister for Culture and the Arts	23 September 2008	17 March 2017	8 years, 175 days
14	David Templeman	Labor	McGowan	Minister for Culture and the Arts	17 March 2017	Incumbent	9 years, 47 days
