= Government of Western Australia =

Australian state government

- State Government
- The corporate logo (top) and state coat of arms (bottom)
- Formation: 21 October 1890; 135 years ago as a colonial government; 1 January 1901; 124 years ago as an Australian state
- Founding document: Constitution of Western Australia
- State: Western Australia
- Country: Australia
- Website: wa.gov.au

Crown
- Head of state: Charles III
- Vice-regal representative: Governor Chris Dawson
- Seat: Government House

Legislative branch
- Legislature: Parliament of Western Australia, comprising: Legislative Council; Legislative Assembly
- Meeting place: Parliament House

Executive branch
- Head of government: Premier Roger Cook
- Main body: Western Australian Ministry
- Appointed by: Governor on behalf of the King
- Headquarters: Dumas House
- Main organ: Executive Council
- Departments: Approximately 130 agencies and authorities

Judicial branch
- Court: Supreme Court
- Seat: David Malcolm Justice Centre

The Government of Western Australia, also known as the WA Government, is the executive branch of government for the Australian state of Western Australia. It comprises the State Cabinet, Executive Council and the public sector. The WA Government includes approximately 130 agencies and authorities delivering frontline and support services, employs approximately 240,000 people and had an expected operating expenditure of A$43.59 billion in the 2024–25 financial year.

The state's founding constitution was enacted in 1890, with the state being a democratic constitutional monarchy. Since federation in 1901, Western Australia has been a constituent state of the Commonwealth of Australia, and the Commonwealth Constitution regulates its relationship with the Australian Government. The legislative branch takes the form of the bicameral Parliament of Western Australia, comprising the Legislative Assembly (lower house), Legislative Council (upper house), and the monarch of Australia represented through the Governor. The judicial branch comprises the Supreme Court of Western Australia and the lower courts.

== Executive and judicial powers ==
Western Australia is governed according to the principles of the Westminster system, a form of parliamentary government based on the model of the United Kingdom. Legislative power rests with the Parliament of Western Australia, which consists of King Charles III, represented by the Governor of Western Australia, and the two Houses, the Western Australian Legislative Council (the upper house) and the Western Australian Legislative Assembly (the lower house). Executive power rests formally with the Executive Council, which consists of all ministers and is presided over by the governor.

The Governor, as representative of the Crown, is the formal repository of power, which is exercised by him or her on the advice of the Premier of Western Australia and the Cabinet. The Premier and Ministers are appointed by the Governor, and hold office by virtue of their ability to command the support of a majority of members of the Legislative Assembly. Judicial power is exercised by the Supreme Court of Western Australia and a system of subordinate courts, but the High Court of Australia and other federal courts have overriding jurisdiction on matters which fall under the ambit of the Australian Constitution.

== Ministries ==
As of 18 March 2025, the following individuals serve as government ministers, at the pleasure of the King, represented by the Governor of Western Australia. All ministers and are members of the Parliament of Western Australia.

== Current composition ==
Office	Minister	Image
Premier; Minister for State Development, Trade and Investment; Minister for Economic Diversification	Roger Cook MLA	
Deputy Premier; Treasurer; Minister for Transport; Minister for Sport and Recreation	Rita Saffioti MLA	
Minister for Regional Development; Minister for Ports; Minister for Science and Innovation; Minister for Medical Research; Minister for the Kimberley	Stephen Dawson MLC	
Minister for Agriculture and Food; Minister for Fisheries; Minister for Forestry; Minister for Small Business; Minister for the Mid West	Jackie Jarvis MLC	
Minister for Emergency Services; Minister for Corrective Services; Minister for Racing and Gaming; Minister for Defence Industries; Minister for Veterans Issues	Paul Papalia MLA	
Attorney-General; Minister for Commerce; Minister for Tertiary and International Education; Minister for Multicultural Interests	Tony Buti MLA	
Minister for Creative Industries; Minister for Heritage; Minister for Industrial Relations; Minister for Aged Care and Seniors; Minister for Women	Simone McGurk MLA	
Minister for Energy and Decarbonisation; Minister for Manufacturing; Minister for Skills and TAFE; Minister for the Pilbara	Amber-Jade Sanderson MLA	
Minister for Planning and Lands; Minister for Housing and Works; Minister for Health Infrastructure	John Carey MLA	
Minister for Aboriginal Affairs; Minister for Water; Minister for Climate Resilience; Minister for the South West	Don Punch MLA	
Minister for Police; Minister for Road Safety; Minister for Tourism; Minister for Great Southern	Reece Whitby MLA	
Minister for Education; Minister for Early Childhood; Minister for Preventative Health; Minister for the Wheatbelt	Sabine Winton MLA	Sabine Winton MLA
Minister for Mines and Petroleum; Minister for Finance; Minister for Electoral Affairs; Minister for Goldfields-Esperance	David Michael MLA	
Minister for Local Government; Minister for Disability Services; Minister for Volunteering; Minister for Youth; Minister for the Gascoyne	Hannah Beazley MLA	
Minister for Child Protection Minister for Prevention of Family and Domestic Violence; Minister assisting the Minister for Transport; Minister for Peel	Jessica Stojkovski MLA	
Minister for Environment; Minister for Community Services; Minister for Homelessness	Matthew Swinbourn MLC	
Minister for Health; Minister for Mental Health	Meredith Hammat MLA	
Cabinet Secretary	Daniel Pastorelli MLA	

== See also ==
- List of Western Australian government agencies
