= Minister for Road Safety (Western Australia) =

Government of Western Australia position

Minister for Road Safety is a position in the government of Western Australia, currently held by David Michael of the Labor Party. The position was first created in 1965, for the government of Sir David Brand. In 1975, responsibility for road safety was transferred to other ministers. It was recreated in 2008, for the government of Colin Barnett. The minister is responsible for the state government's Road Safety Commission, a standalone government department.

== Titles ==
- 16 March 1965 – 3 March 1971: Minister for Traffic
- 6 July 1972 – 8 April 1974: Minister for Traffic Safety
- 8 April 1974 – 5 June 1975: Minister for Traffic
- 23 September 2008 – present: Minister for Road Safety

== List of ministers ==
Term start	Term end	Minister	Party
16 March 1965	3 March 1971	James Craig	Country
1971–1972: no minister – responsibilities held by other ministers
6 July 1972	8 April 1974	Colin Jamieson	Labor
8 April 1974	5 June 1975	Ray O'Connor	Liberal
1975–1982: no minister – responsibilities held by combined Minister for Police and Traffic
1982–2008: no minister – responsibilities held by other ministers
23 September 2008	29 June 2012	Rob Johnson	Liberal
29 June 2012	17 March 2017	Liza Harvey	Liberal
17 March 2017	19 March 2021	Michelle Roberts	Labor
19 March 2021	8 June 2023	Paul Papalia	Labor
8 June 2023	incumbent	David Michael	Labor

== See also ==
- Minister for Emergency Services (Western Australia)
- Minister for Police (Western Australia)
