= Minister for Mental Health (Western Australia) =

Minister for Mental Health is a position in the government of Western Australia, currently held by Amber-Jade Sanderson of the Labor Party. The position was first created after the 2008 state election, for the government of Colin Barnett. The minister is responsible for the state government's Mental Health Commission.

== Titles ==
- 23 September 2008 – present: Minister for Mental Health

== List of ministers ==
Term start	Term end	Minister(s)	Party
23 September 2008	14 December 2010	Graham Jacobs	Liberal
14 December 2010	31 March 2016	Helen Morton	Liberal
31 March 2016	17 March 2017	Andrea Mitchell	Liberal
17 March 2017	21 December 2021	Roger Cook	Labor
21 December 2021		Amber-Jade Sanderson	Labor

== See also ==
- Minister for Health (Western Australia)
- Minister for Mental Health and Ageing (Australia)
  - Minister for Mental Health (New South Wales)
  - Minister for Mental Health (Victoria)
