= Minister for Heritage (Western Australia) =

Minister for Heritage is a position in the government of Western Australia, currently held by David Templeman of the Labor Party. The position was first created in 1990, for the government of Carmen Lawrence, and has existed in every government since then. The minister is responsible for the State Heritage Office, and also for the Heritage Council of Western Australia.

== Titles ==
- 19 February 1990 – present: Minister for Heritage

== List of ministers ==
Term start	Term end	Minister	Party
19 February 1990	5 February 1991	Kay Hallahan	Labor
5 February 1991	16 February 1993	Jim McGinty	Labor
16 February 1993	9 January 1997	Richard Lewis	Liberal
9 January 1997	16 February 2001	Graham Kierath	Liberal
16 February 2001	27 June 2003	Judy Edwards	Labor
27 June 2003	16 September 2004	Tom Stephens	Labor
16 September 2004	21 September 2004	Kim Chance	Labor
21 September 2004	10 March 2005	Judy Edwards	Labor
10 March 2005	3 February 2006	Fran Logan	Labor
3 February 2006	23 September 2008	Michelle Roberts	Labor
23 September 2008	21 March 2013	John Castrilli	Liberal
21 March 2013	17 March 2017	Albert Jacob	Liberal
17 March 2017		David Templeman	Labor

== See also ==
- Minister for Culture and the Arts (Western Australia)
- Minister for Planning (Western Australia)
