= Minister for Community Services (Western Australia) =

Minister for Community Services is a position in the government of Western Australia, currently held by Matthew Swinbourn of the Labor Party. The position was first created after the 1943 state election, for the government of John Willcock. It was abolished in 1947 and not recreated until 1971, but has existed in most governments since then. The minister is one of the ministers responsible for the state government's Department of Local Government and Communities.

Between 1986 and 2001 there was a separate minister titled either Minister for the Family or Minister for Family and Children's Services, whose responsibilities are now held by the Minister for Community Services.

== List of community services ministers ==
Titles

- 9 December 1943 – 1 April 1947: Minister for Social Services
- 3 March 1971 – 25 February 1983: Minister for Community Welfare
- 25 February 1983 – 7 September 1992: Minister for Community Services
- 7 September 1992 – 13 December 2006: Minister for Community Development
- 13 December 2006 – 23 September 2008: Minister for Communities
- 23 September 2008 – present: Minister for Community Services

Term start	Term end	Minister	Party
9 December 1943	1 April 1947	John Tonkin	Labor
1947–1971: no minister – responsibilities held by other ministers
3 March 1971	7 February 1973	Bill Willesee	Labor
7 February 1973	8 April 1974	Ronald Thompson	Labor
8 April 1974	20 May 1975	Norm Baxter	National Country
20 May 1975	5 June 1975	Graham MacKinnon	Liberal
5 June 1975	10 March 1977	Norm Baxter (again)	National Country
10 March 1977	25 August 1978	Alan Ridge	Liberal
25 August 1978	5 March 1980	Ray Young	Liberal
5 March 1980	25 January 1982	Bill Hassell	Liberal
25 January 1982	14 May 1982	Ray Young (again)	Liberal
14 May 1982	25 February 1983	Richard Shalders	Liberal
25 February 1983	25 February 1986	Keith Wilson	Labor
25 February 1986	28 February 1989	Kay Hallahan	Labor
28 February 1989	5 February 1991	David Smith	Labor
5 February 1991	16 February 1993	Eric Ripper	Labor
16 February 1993	29 June 1995	Roger Nicholls	Liberal
1995–2001: no minister – responsibilities held by other ministers
16 February 2001	3 February 2006	Sheila McHale	Labor
3 February 2006	2 March 2007	David Templeman	Labor
2 March 2007	23 September 2008	Sue Ellery	Labor
23 September 2008	21 March 2013	Robyn McSweeney	Liberal
21 March 2013	20 September 2016	Tony Simpson	Liberal
22 September 2016	17 March 2017	Paul Miles	Liberal
17 March 2017	14 December 2022	Simone McGurk	Labor
14 December 2022	19 March 2025	Sabine Winton	Labor
19 March 2025	Incumbent	Matthew Swinbourn	Labor

== List of family ministers ==
Titles

- 25 February 1986 – 29 June 1995: Minister for the Family
- 29 June 1995 – 16 February 2001: Minister for Family and Children's Services

Term start	Term end	Minister	Party
25 February 1986	19 February 1990	Kay Hallahan	Labor
19 February 1990	7 September 1992	Carmen Lawrence	Labor
7 September 1992	16 February 1993	Eric Ripper	Labor
16 February 1993	21 December 1995	Roger Nicholls	Liberal
21 December 1995	9 January 1997	Cheryl Edwardes	Liberal
9 January 1997	22 December 1999	Rhonda Parker	Liberal
22 December 1999	16 February 2001	June van de Klashorst	Liberal

== See also ==
- Minister for Child Protection (Western Australia)
- Minister for Disability Services (Western Australia)
- Minister for Health (Western Australia)
- Minister for Housing (Western Australia)
- Minister for Local Government (Western Australia)
