= Minister for Racing and Gaming (Western Australia) =

Minister for Racing and Gaming is a position in the government of Western Australia, currently held by Paul Papalia of the Labor Party. The position was first created in 1984, in the ministry of Brian Burke, and has existed in every government since then. The minister is responsible for the Department of Racing, Gaming and Liquor, which oversees gambling, liquor licenses, and racing in Western Australia.

== Titles ==
- 20 December 1984 – present: Minister for Racing and Gaming

== List of ministers ==
| Term start | Term end | Minister | Party |
|---|---|---|---|
| 20 December 1984 | 25 February 1986 | Des Dans | Labor |
| 25 February 1986 | 28 February 1989 | Pam Beggs | Labor |
| 28 February 1989 | 12 February 1990 | Graham Edwards | Labor |
| 19 February 1990 | 16 February 1993 | Pam Beggs (2nd term) | Labor |
| 16 February 1993 | 22 December 1999 | Max Evans | Liberal |
| 22 December 1999 | 16 February 2001 | Norman Moore | Liberal |
| 16 February 2001 | 10 March 2005 | Nick Griffiths | Labor |
| 10 March 2005 | 13 December 2006 | Mark McGowan | Labor |
| 13 December 2006 | 2 March 2007 | John Bowler | Labor |
| 2 March 2007 | 23 September 2008 | Ljiljanna Ravlich | Labor |
| 23 September 2008 | 8 December 2014 | Terry Waldron | National |
| 8 December 2014 | 15 August 2016 | Colin Holt | National |
| 15 August 2016 | 17 March 2017 | Brendon Grylls | National |
| 17 March 2017 | 19 March 2021 | Paul Papalia | Labor |
| 19 March 2021 | | Reece Whitby | Labor |

== See also ==
- Minister for Sport and Recreation (Western Australia)
- Minister for Tourism (Western Australia)
