= Minister for Emergency Services (Western Australia) =

Minister in the Western Australian Government

Minister for Emergency Services is a position in the Government of Western Australia, currently held by Paul Papalia of the Labor Party. A separate emergency services portfolio was first created in 1982, for the government of Ray O'Connor. It has often been held by the Minister of Police, and on two occasions (from 1983 to 1990 and from 2001 to 2008) the two portfolios were merged under a single Minister for Police and Emergency Services. The current minister is responsible for the state government's Department of Fire and Emergency Services (DFES).

== Titles ==
- 25 January 1982 – present: Minister for Emergency Services

== List of ministers ==
Term start	Term end	Minister	Party
25 January 1982	25 February 1983	Cyril Rushton	Liberal
1983–1990: no minister – responsibilities held by combined Minister for Police and Emergency Services
19 February 1990	16 February 1993	Graham Edwards	Labor
16 February 1993	9 January 1997	Bob Wiese	National
9 January 1997	28 July 1998	John Day	Liberal
28 July 1998	16 February 2001	Kevin Prince	Liberal
16 February 2001	1 July 2001	Michelle Roberts	Labor
2001–2008: no minister – responsibilities held by combined Minister for Police and Emergency Services
23 September 2008	6 December 2011	Rob Johnson	Liberal
6 December 2011	21 March 2013	Troy Buswell	Liberal
21 March 2013	17 March 2017	Joe Francis	Liberal
17 March 2017	14 December 2022	Fran Logan	Labor
14 December 2022	18 March 2025	Stephen Dawson	Labor
19 March 2025	10 July 2026	Paul Papalia	Labor

== See also ==
- Minister for Police (Western Australia)
- Minister for Road Safety (Western Australia)
