= Minister for Fisheries (Western Australia) =

Minister for Fisheries is a position in the government of Western Australia, currently held by Don Punch of the Labor Party. The position was first created after the 1947 state election, in the new ministry formed by Ross McLarty. It has existed in every government since then, sometimes under different titles. The minister is currently responsible for the state government's Fisheries within the Department of Primary Industries and Regional Development. It is responsible for commercial and recreational fishing in Western Australia.

== Titles ==
- 1 April 1947 – 16 March 1965: Minister for Fisheries
- 16 March 1965 – 20 December 1974: Minister for Fisheries and Fauna
- 20 December 1974 – 20 December 1984: Minister for Fisheries and Wildlife
- 20 December 1984 – present: Minister for Fisheries

== List of ministers ==
Term start	Term end	Minister	Party
1 April 1947	23 February 1953	Arthur Abbott	Liberal
23 February 1953	2 April 1959	Lionel Kelly	Labor
2 April 1959	17 August 1965	Ross Hutchinson	Liberal
17 August 1965	3 March 1971	Graham MacKinnon	Liberal
3 March 1971	6 July 1972	Ron Davies	Labor
6 July 1972	8 April 1974	Arthur Bickerton	Labor
8 April 1974	20 May 1975	Matt Stephens	National Country
5 June 1975	10 March 1977	Peter Jones	National Country
10 March 1977	25 August 1978	Graham MacKinnon (again)	Liberal
25 August 1978	5 March 1980	Ray O'Connor	Liberal
5 March 1980	25 January 1982	Gordon Masters	Liberal
25 January 1982	25 February 1983	Dick Old	National Country
25 February 1983	25 February 1986	David Evans	Labor
25 February 1986	28 February 1989	Julian Grill	Labor
28 February 1989	16 February 1993	Gordon Hill	Labor
16 February 1993	16 February 2001	Monty House	National
16 February 2001	10 March 2005	Kim Chance	Labor
10 March 2005	23 September 2008	Jon Ford	Labor
23 September 2008	21 March 2013	Norman Moore	Liberal
21 March 2013	11 December 2013	Troy Buswell	Liberal
11 December 2013	31 March 2016	Ken Baston	Liberal
31 March 2016	17 March 2017	Joe Francis	Liberal
17 March 2017	18 December 2019	Dave Kelly	Labor
18 December 2019	19 March 2021	Peter Tinley	Labor
19 March 2021	incumbent	Don Punch	Labor

== See also ==
- Minister for Agriculture and Food (Western Australia)
- Minister for the Environment (Western Australia)
