= Minister for Sport and Recreation (Western Australia) =

Position in the government of Western Australia

Minister for Sport and Recreation is a position in the government of Western Australia, currently held by Rita Saffioti of the Labor Party. The position was first created in 1972, in the ministry of John Tonkin, and has existed in every government since then. The minister is responsible for the Department of Sport and Recreation.

== Titles ==
- 6 July 1972 – 20 December 1984: Minister for Recreation
- 20 December 1984 – present: Minister for Sport and Recreation

== List of ministers ==
Term start	Term end	Minister	Party
6 July 1972	8 April 1974	Tom Evans	Labor
8 April 1974	10 March 1977	Graham MacKinnon	Liberal
10 March 1977	5 March 1980	Peter Jones	National Country
5 March 1980	25 January 1982	Bill Grayden	Liberal
25 January 1982	25 February 1983	Bob Pike	Liberal
25 February 1983	25 February 1988	Keith Wilson	Labor
25 February 1988	12 February 1990	Graham Edwards	Labor
19 February 1990	27 February 1991	Gordon Hill	Labor
27 February 1991	16 February 1993	Graham Edwards (again)	Labor
16 February 1993	24 August 1993	Doug Shave	Liberal
24 August 1993	16 February 2001	Norman Moore	Liberal
16 February 2001	27 June 2003	Alan Carpenter	Labor
27 June 2003	13 October 2005	Bob Kucera	Labor
13 October 2005	25 November 2005	Mark McGowan	Labor
25 November 2005	23 September 2008	John Kobelke	Labor
3 February 2006	3 February 2006	John Bowler	Labor
23 September 2008	8 December 2014	Terry Waldron	National
8 December 2014	17 March 2017	Mia Davies	National
17 March 2017	13 March 2021	Mick Murray	Labor
19 March 2021	21 December 2021	Tony Buti	Labor
21 December 2021	19 March 2025	David Templeman	Labor
19 March 2025	incumbent	Rita Saffioti	Labor

== See also ==
- Minister for Racing and Gaming (Western Australia)
- Minister for Tourism (Western Australia)
- Minister for Sport (Australia)
  - Minister for Sport (New South Wales)
  - Minister for Sport (Victoria)
  - Minister for Sport and Recreation (Northern Territory)
