= Murray Cowper =

Australian politician

Member of the Western Australian Legislative Assembly for Murray-Wellington
- In office 26 February 2005 – 11 March 2017
- Succeeded by: Robyn Clarke

Personal details
- Born: 25 October 1960 (age 65) Perth, Western Australia
- Party: Liberal Party
- Spouse: Kathleen Cowper

Murray John Cowper (born 25 October 1960) is an Australian politician, having served in the Western Australian Legislative Assembly from 2005 to 2017 as the Liberal member for Murray-Wellington.

He was born in South Perth. He joined the Western Australian Police in 1978, and served as a police officer in Broome, Fitzroy Crossing, Halls Creek, Dampier, Denmark and Australind. Along the way he achieved a Diploma in Search and Rescue, and a Diploma of Business Management, and ran a business with his wife.

He was elected to the seat of Murray at the 2005 election, succeeding John Bradshaw. The seat was renamed Murray-Wellington at the 2008 election. He was appointed to the Barnett Ministry as a parliamentary secretary.

Western Australian Legislative Assembly
Preceded by John Bradshaw (as member for Murray-Wellington)	Member for Murray; 2005–2008	Succeeded by Self (as member for Murray-Wellington)
Preceded by Self (as member for Murray)	Member for Murray-Wellington; 2008–2017	Succeeded by Robyn Clarke
