= Simone McGurk =

Australian politician

The Honourable Simone McGurk MLA
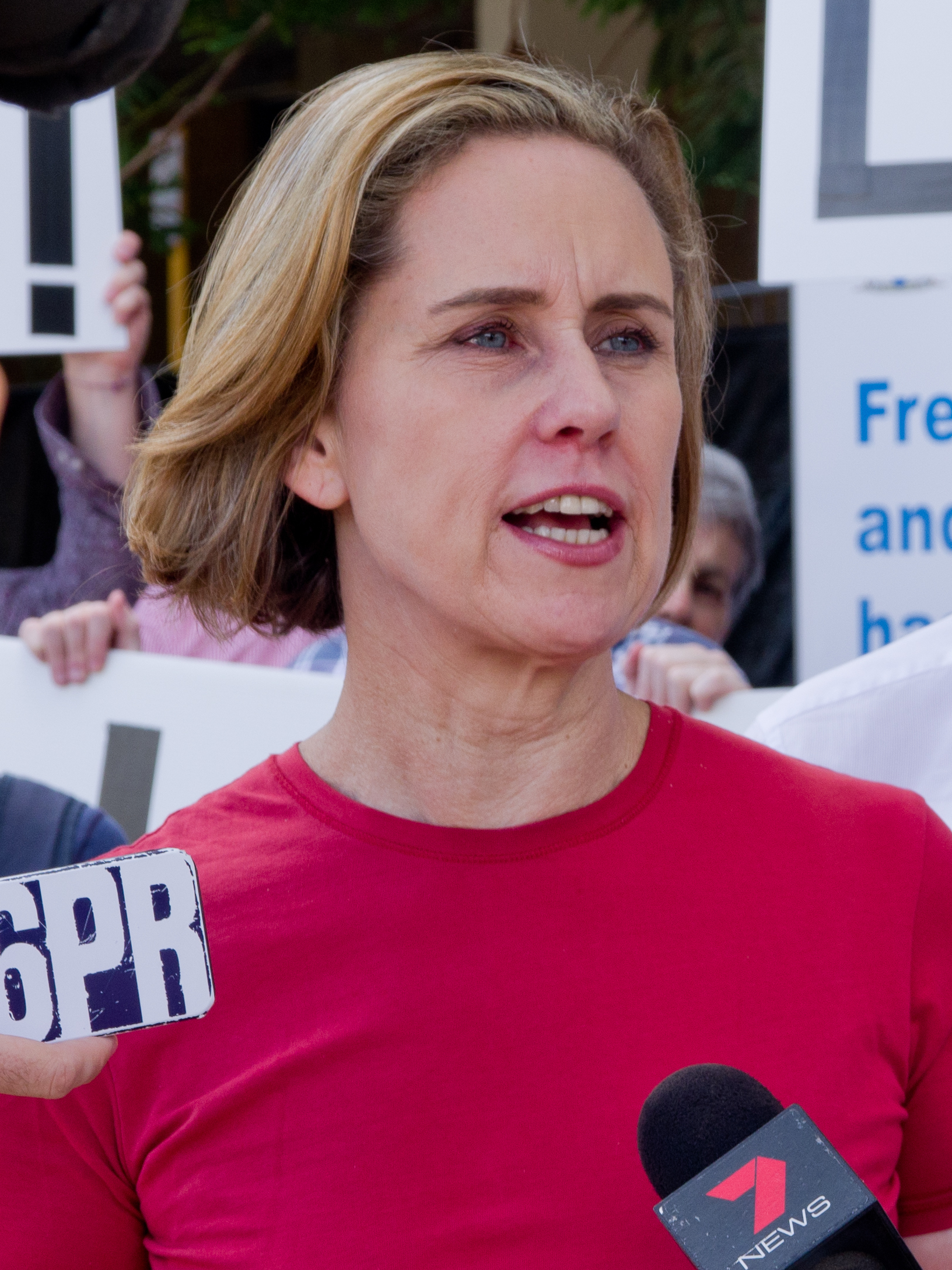
- McGurk in 2015

Minister for Creative Industries
- Incumbent
- Assumed office 19 March 2025
- Premier: Roger Cook
- Preceded by: David Templeman (as Minister for Culture and the Arts)

Minister for Heritage
- Incumbent
- Assumed office 19 March 2025
- Premier: Roger Cook
- Preceded by: David Templeman

Minister for Aged Care and Seniors
- Incumbent
- Assumed office 19 March 2025
- Premier: Roger Cook
- Preceded by: Don Punch (as Minister for Seniors and Ageing)

Minister for Women
- Incumbent
- Assumed office 19 March 2025
- Premier: Roger Cook
- Preceded by: Sue Ellery (as Minister for Women's Interests)

Minister for Industrial Relations
- Incumbent
- Assumed office 8 December 2023
- Premier: Mark McGowan; Roger Cook
- Preceded by: Bill Johnston

Minister for Training and Workforce Development
- In office 8 December 2023 – 19 March 2025
- Premier: Mark McGowan; Roger Cook
- Preceded by: Herself (as Minister for Training)
- Succeeded by: Amber-Jade Sanderson (as Minister for Skills and TAFE)

Minister for Water
- In office 14 December 2022 – 19 March 2025
- Premier: Mark McGowan; Roger Cook
- Preceded by: Dave Kelly
- Succeeded by: Don Punch

Minister for Training
- In office 14 December 2022 – 8 December 2023
- Premier: Mark McGowan; Roger Cook
- Preceded by: Sue Ellery (as Minister for Education and Training)
- Succeeded by: Herself (as Minister for Training and Workforce Development)

Minister for Youth
- In office 14 December 2022 – 8 December 2023
- Premier: Mark McGowan; Roger Cook
- Preceded by: Dave Kelly
- Succeeded by: Hannah Beazley

Minister for Child Protection
- In office 17 March 2017 – 14 December 2022
- Premier: Mark McGowan
- Preceded by: Andrea Mitchell
- Succeeded by: Sabine Winton

Minister for Women's Interests
- In office 17 March 2017 – 14 December 2022
- Premier: Mark McGowan
- Preceded by: Liza Harvey
- Succeeded by: Sue Ellery

Minister for the Prevention of Family and Domestic Violence
- In office 17 March 2017 – 14 December 2022
- Premier: Mark McGowan
- Preceded by: Position established
- Succeeded by: Sabine Winton

Minister for Community Services
- In office 17 March 2017 – 14 December 2022
- Premier: Mark McGowan
- Preceded by: Paul Miles
- Succeeded by: Sabine Winton

Member of the Western Australian Legislative Assembly for Fremantle
- Incumbent
- Assumed office 9 March 2013
- Preceded by: Adele Carles

Personal details
- Born: Simone Frances McGurk; 5 December 1963 (age 62) Perth, Western Australia
- Party: Labor Party
- Website: simonemcgurk.com.au

Simone Frances McGurk (born 5 December 1963) is an Australian politician. She is the member of the Western Australian Legislative Assembly for the seat of Fremantle, and Minister for Water, Industrial Relations and Training and Workforce Development.

Prior to entering Parliament, McGurk was Secretary of UnionsWA, Western Australia's peak trade union body, having previously served as an official of the Australian Manufacturing Workers Union and United Voice. She also served as a member of the Western Australian State Training Board, and on the board of the Industry superannuation fund, AustralianSuper. McGurk has also worked as a producer for the Australian Broadcasting Corporation, and in native title for the Yamatji Land and Sea Council.

== In Government ==
On 17 March 2017, McGurk was sworn in as Minister for Child Protection; Women's Interests; Prevention of Family and Domestic Violence; Community Services, and served in these roles until 14 December 2022.

McGurk oversaw significant family and Domestic violence reforms and introduced legislation for safe access zones around Abortion clinics.

She served as Minister for Training; Water; Youth from 14 December 2022 to 8 December 2023, then Minister for Training and Workforce Development; Water; Industrial Relations from 8 December 2023.

She was re-elected in the 2025 Western Australian state election.

== See also ==
- Members of the Western Australian Legislative Assembly, 2013–2017
- Members of the Western Australian Legislative Assembly, 2017–2021
- Members of the Western Australian Legislative Assembly, 2021–2025
- Members of the Western Australian Legislative Assembly, 2025–2029

Western Australian Legislative Assembly
| Preceded by Adele Carles | Member for Fremantle; 2013–present | Incumbent |
