= Robyn McSweeney =

Australian politician

Minister for Child Protection; Community Services; Seniors and Volunteering; Women's Interests; Youth
- In office 14 December 2010 – 21 March 2013

Minister for Women's Interests
- In office 9 February 2009 – 14 December 2010

Minister for Child Protection; Community Services; Seniors and Volunteering
- In office 23 September 2008 – 14 December 2010

Member of the Western Australian Parliament for South West
- In office 10 February 2001 – 21 May 2017

Personal details
- Born: 9 October 1957 (age 68) Bridgetown, Western Australia
- Citizenship: Australian
- Party: Liberal Party
- Spouse: Michael
- Children: Four

Robyn Mary McSweeney (born 9 October 1957) is an Australian politician. She was a Liberal member of the Western Australian Legislative Council from 2001 to 2017, representing the region of South West.

McSweeney was born in Bridgetown, Western Australia. She was educated at Bridgetown and Manjimup high schools, and gained a degree in Politics, Philosophy and Sociology.

McSweeney was the Minister for Child Protection, Community Services, and Seniors and Volunteering, having held these portfolios as shadow minister prior to the Coalition's election in 2008. During her time in office, she was also Minister for Youth and Minister for Women’s Interests.

In 2015, she published the biography of her great-grandfather, Albert Edmund Cockram, an importer of racehorses.

In 2022 she was awarded the Medal of the Order of Australia.
