= Roger Cook (politician) =

Premier of Western Australia since 2023

The Honourable Roger Cook MLA
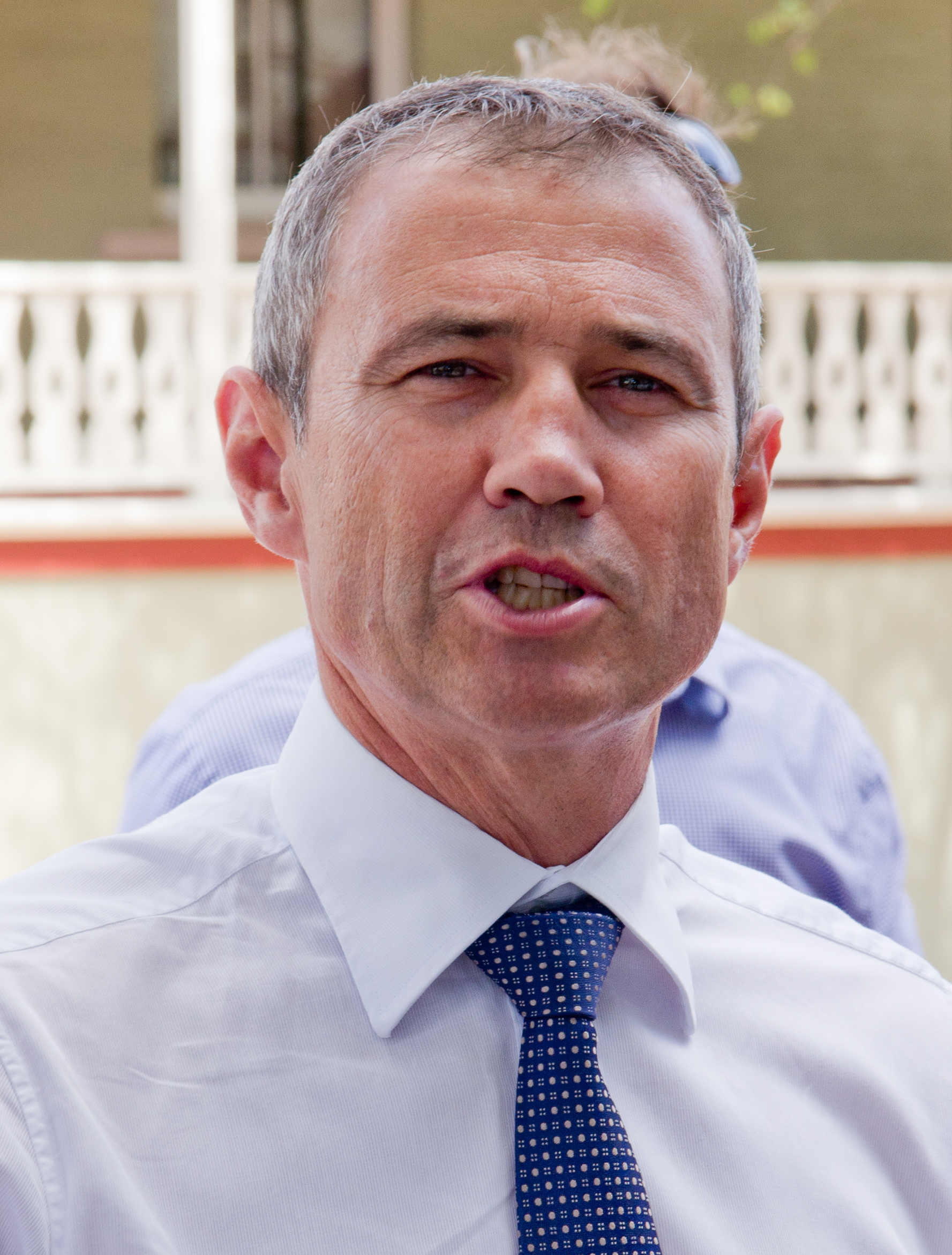
- Cook in 2015

31st Premier of Western Australia
- Incumbent
- Assumed office 8 June 2023
- Monarch: Charles III
- Governor: Chris Dawson
- Deputy: Rita Saffioti
- Preceded by: Mark McGowan

Minister for Tourism, Trade and Investment
- Incumbent
- Assumed office 13 July 2026
- Premier: Himself
- Preceded by: Himself (as Minister for State Development, Trade and Investment); Reece Whitby (as Minister for Tourism)

Minister for Defence Industries
- Incumbent
- Assumed office 13 July 2026
- Preceded by: Paul Papalia

Minister for Economic Diversification
- Incumbent
- Assumed office 19 March 2025
- Premier: Himself
- Preceded by: Position established

17th Deputy Premier of Western Australia
- In office 17 March 2017 – 8 June 2023
- Premier: Mark McGowan
- Preceded by: Liza Harvey
- Succeeded by: Rita Saffioti
Ministerial positions
Minister for Public Sector Management Minister for Federal-State Relations
In office 8 June 2023 – 19 March 2025
Premier	Himself
Preceded by	Mark McGowan
Succeeded by	Position abolished
Minister for Health
In office 17 March 2017 – 17 December 2021
Premier	Mark McGowan
Preceded by	John Day
Succeeded by	Amber-Jade Sanderson
Minister for Mental Health
In office 17 March 2017 – 17 December 2021
Premier	Mark McGowan
Preceded by	John Day
Succeeded by	Amber-Jade Sanderson
Minister for Medical Research
In office 19 March 2021 – 21 December 2021
Premier	Mark McGowan
Succeeded by	Stephen Dawson
Minister for State Development, Jobs and Trade
In office 19 March 2021 – 19 March 2025
Premier	Mark McGowan
Preceded by	Alannah MacTiernan
Succeeded by	Himself (as Minister for State Development, Trade and Investment)
Minister for Tourism
In office 21 December 2021 – 8 June 2023
Premier	Mark McGowan
Preceded by	David Templeman
Succeeded by	Rita Saffioti
Minister for Commerce
In office 21 December 2021 – 14 December 2022
Premier	Mark McGowan
Preceded by	Amber-Jade Sanderson
Succeeded by	Sue Ellery
Minister for Science
In office 19 March 2021 – 8 June 2023
Premier	Mark McGowan
Preceded by	Dave Kelly
Succeeded by	Stephen Dawson
Minister for Hydrogen Industry
In office 14 December 2022 – 8 June 2023
Premier	Mark McGowan
Preceded by	Alannah MacTiernan
Succeeded by	Bill Johnston

Leader of the Western Australian Labor Party
- Incumbent
- Assumed office 6 June 2023
- Deputy: Rita Saffioti
- Preceded by: Mark McGowan

Deputy Leader of the Western Australian Labor Party
- In office 16 September 2008 – 6 June 2023
- Leader: Eric Ripper; Mark McGowan
- Preceded by: Eric Ripper
- Succeeded by: Rita Saffioti

Personal details
- Born: 20 August 1965 (age 61) Cottesloe, Western Australia, Australia
- Party: Labor
- Education: Curtin University; Murdoch University
- Website: kwinana.walabor.org.au

Roger Hugh Cook (born 20 August 1965) is an Australian politician serving as the 31st and current premier of Western Australia since 2023. He has been the leader of the Western Australian branch of the Australian Labor Party (ALP) since 2023 and a member of the Western Australian Legislative Assembly (MLA) for the electoral district of Kwinana since 2008. He was previously deputy premier of Western Australia from 2017 to 2023.

Cook was born in Perth and holds degrees from Murdoch University and Curtin University. Prior to being elected to parliament he was involved in student politics, serving as the first president of the National Union of Students, and worked as a public relations consultant and in management roles with Aboriginal corporations. Cook was elected to the Western Australian Legislative Assembly at the 2008 state election, representing the seat of Kwinana. He was elected deputy leader of the Labor Party ten days after first being elected to parliament, and held this position until his appointment as leader of the party in 2023. He held senior ministerial office under Mark McGowan from 2017 to 2023, before being elected as McGowan's successor after his mid-term resignation.

== Early life ==
Cook was born on 20 August 1965 in Cottesloe, Western Australia. He is the youngest of six children born to Hugh David Cook, a child psychiatrist, and Lynette Ada Owen, an early childhood educator. Cook grew up in the suburb of Claremont and was educated at Scotch College. As a teenager he represented Western Australia in rugby union.

Cook graduated from Murdoch University with a Bachelor of Arts in public administration and later completed a graduate diploma in business (public relations) and a Master of Business Administration at Curtin University. Whilst at Murdoch, he became involved in student politics, serving as a student representative on the university's senate. He was also involved in the establishment of the National Union of Students in mid-1986, becoming its first national president as a representative of the National Organisation of Labor Students.

== Career ==
After graduating, Cook worked in the offices of a number of Labor MPs, including Stephen Smith, Jim McGinty, and Chris Evans. He served as state president of the Labor Party from 1999 to 2000. Cook later became involved with Aboriginal advocacy groups, serving at various times as a policy coordinator for the Western Australian Aboriginal Native Title Working Group, as CEO of the Yamatji Marlpa Barna Baba Maaja Aboriginal Corporation, and as government relations manager for the South West Aboriginal Land and Sea Council. From 2004 to 2008, he was state manager of CPR, a public relations firm which is closely associated with the Labor Party.

== Politics ==
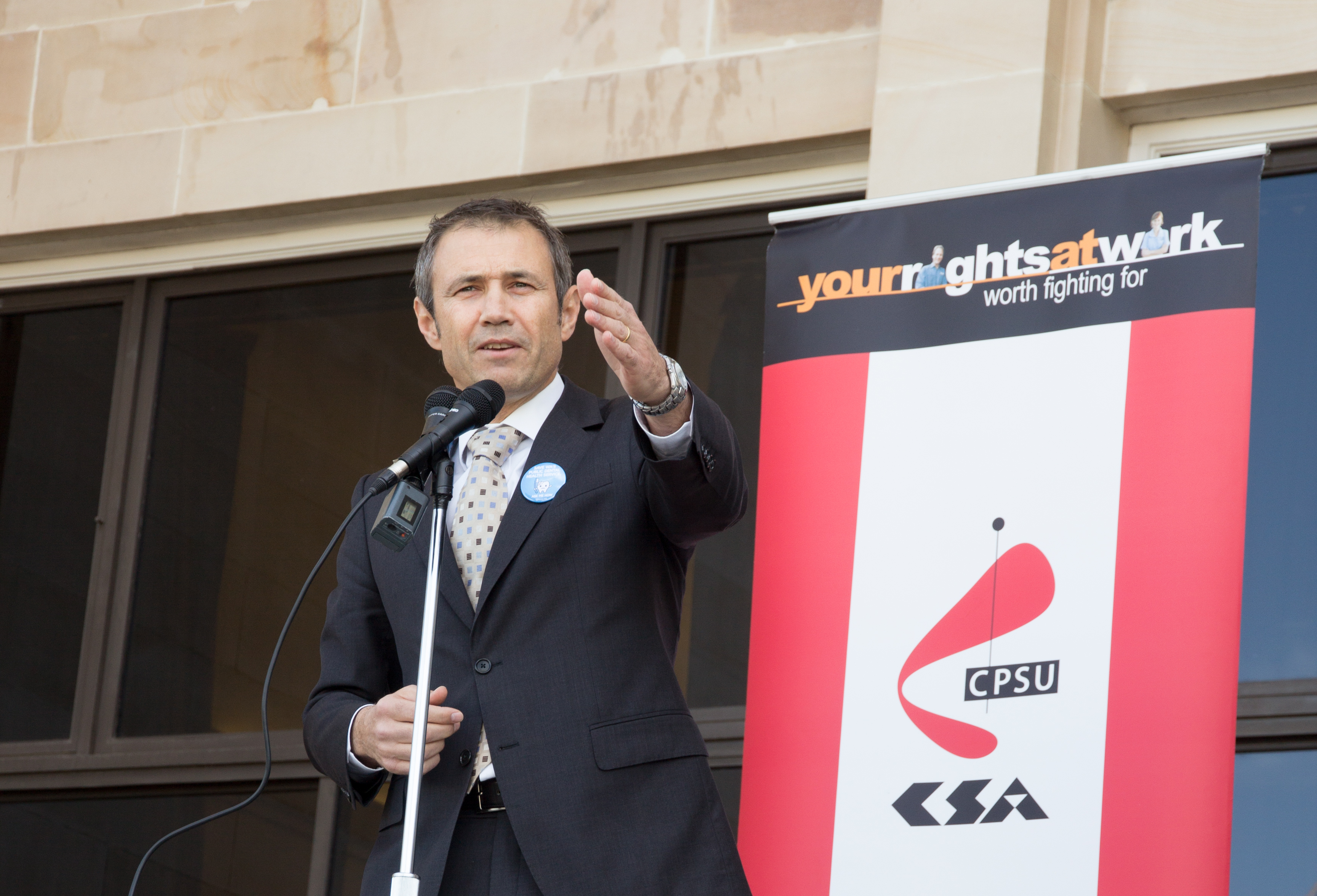
Cook speaking at a Community and Public Sector Union rally in 2012

At the 2008 state election, Cook won the seat of Kwinana in a tightly fought contest, winning by 300 votes from independent candidate Carol Adams, the mayor of the City of Kwinana. Adams had unsuccessfully attempted to gain Labor pre-selection, and later accused Alan Carpenter of "parachuting" Cook into the seat. On 16 September, ten days after the election, Cook was elected to the position of deputy leader of the Labor Party under Eric Ripper. He is a member of the Labor Left faction, backed by the United Voice trade union (previously known as the Liquor, Hospitality and Miscellaneous Union). After Ripper was replaced by Mark McGowan as leader of the opposition in January 2012, Cook maintained his position as deputy leader. He was re-elected at the 2013 state election in a rematch with Adams, winning an increased majority.

However, Kwinana was a very safe Labor seat in a "traditional" two-party matchup with the Liberals; Cook would have won it in both 2008 and 2013 with majorities of well over 10 percent in a traditional contest with a Liberal candidate. Proving this, Cook was easily reelected in 2017 amid the massive Labor wave that swept through Perth, taking over 68 percent of the two-party vote, a "traditional" two-party swing of seven percent.

Cook was responsible for a high-profile portfolio as Minister for Health from 2017 to 2021, particularly following the outbreak of the COVID-19 pandemic in Australia in early 2020. He also played a key role in the passage of voluntary assisted dying legislation in 2019.

After a ministerial reshuffle in December 2021, Cook was removed from the Health Ministry in favour of Amber-Jade Sanderson. He assumed the portfolio of Tourism, while retaining his status as Deputy Premier, and the ministries of State Development, Jobs and Trade, and Commerce and Science. After another reshuffle in December 2022, Cook became the Minister for Hydrogen Industry, taking over from the retiring Alannah MacTiernan, and was succeeded as the minister for commerce by Sue Ellery.

=== Premier ===
Following the resignation of McGowan as premier in May 2023, Cook was the first minister to announce his intention to stand in the ensuing leadership ballot, along with Transport Minister Rita Saffioti and Health Minister Amber-Jade Sanderson. 26 Labor MPs affiliated with the United Workers Union held a meeting on 30 May, choosing to support Sanderson over Cook, 17 votes to 11. The 17 Australian Manufacturing Workers Union MPs held a meeting on the afternoon of 30 May, unanimously choosing to back Cook to be leader and Saffioti to be deputy leader and treasurer.

In August 2023, Cook announced that the Aboriginal Cultural Heritage Act 2021 would be repealed and the 1972 legislation reinstated.

In March 2025, Cook apologised for describing Vice President of the United States JD Vance as a "knob" at a leadership forum.

In the 2025 Western Australian state election, he was re-elected in his seat of Kwinana with a two-party-preferred vote of 75 percent, making it the second-safest in the state. He was also returned as premier in his own right. Labor lost seven seats from the large majority Cook had inherited from McGowan on a swing of 12.5 percent. However, Cook still won a decisive 16-seat majority, with only seven Liberals and six Nationals as opposition.

== Portfolios ==
Cook has held the following portfolios since his election in 2008:

- 26 September 2008–27 January 2012: Deputy Leader of the Opposition; Shadow Minister for Health; Shadow Minister for Mental Health; Shadow Minister for Indigenous Affairs
- 27 January 2012–9 April 2013: Deputy Leader of the Opposition; Shadow Minister for Health
- 9 April 2013–26 June 2015: Deputy Leader of the Opposition; Shadow Minister for Health; Shadow Minister for Science
- 26 June 2015–17 March 2017: Deputy Leader of the Opposition; Shadow Minister for Health
- 17 March 2017–21 December 2021: Minister for Health and Minister for Mental Health
- 21 December 2021–14 December 2022: Deputy Premier; Minister for Tourism; State Development, Jobs and Trade; Commerce and Science
- 14 December 2022–8 June 2023: Deputy Premier; Minister for State Development, Jobs and Trade; Hydrogen Industry; Tourism; Science
- 8 June 2023–present: Premier; Minister for State and Industry Development, Jobs and Trade; Public Sector Management; Federal-State Relations

== Personal life ==
Cook married his wife Carly Lane in 2010 and has two children from a previous marriage. Lane is a curator of Indigenous Australian art at the Art Gallery of Western Australia.

Cook is a supporter of the Western Force and Fremantle Football Club.

Western Australian Legislative Assembly
New seat	Member for Kwinana; 6 September 2008 – present	Incumbent
Political offices
Preceded by Liza Harvey	Deputy Premier of Western Australia; 17 March 2017 – 8 June 2023	Succeeded by Rita Saffioti
Preceded by John Day	Minister for Health; 17 March 2017 – 21 December 2021	Succeeded by Amber-Jade Sanderson
Preceded by Andrea Mitchell	Minister for Mental Health; 17 March 2017 – 19 March 2021	Succeeded by Amber-Jade Sanderson
New title	Minister for Medical Research; 19 March 2021 – 21 December 2021	Succeeded by Stephen Dawson
Preceded by Dave Kelly	Minister for Science; 19 March 2021 – 8 June 2023	Succeeded by Stephen Dawson
Preceded by Mark McGowan	Minister for State Development, Jobs and Trade; 19 March 2021 – present	Incumbent
Preceded by David Templeman	Minister for Tourism; 21 December 2021 – present	Incumbent
Preceded by Amber-Jade Sanderson	Minister for Commerce; 21 December 2021 – 14 December 2022	Succeeded by Sue Ellery
Preceded by Alannah MacTiernan	Minister for Hydrogen Industry; 14 December 2022 – 8 June 2023	Succeeded by Bill Johnston
Preceded by Mark McGowan	Minister for Public Sector Management; 8 June 2023 – present	Incumbent
Preceded by Mark McGowan	Minister for Federal-State Relations; 8 June 2023 – present	Incumbent
Preceded by Mark McGowan	Premier of Western Australia; 8 June 2023 – present	Incumbent
Party political offices
Preceded by Eric Ripper	Deputy Leader of the Western Australian Labor Party; 16 September 2008 – 6 June 2023	Succeeded by Rita Saffioti
Preceded by Mark McGowan	Leader of the Western Australian Labor Party; 6 June 2023 – present	Incumbent
