= Colin Barnett =

Australian politician (born 1950)

The Honourable Colin Barnett AC
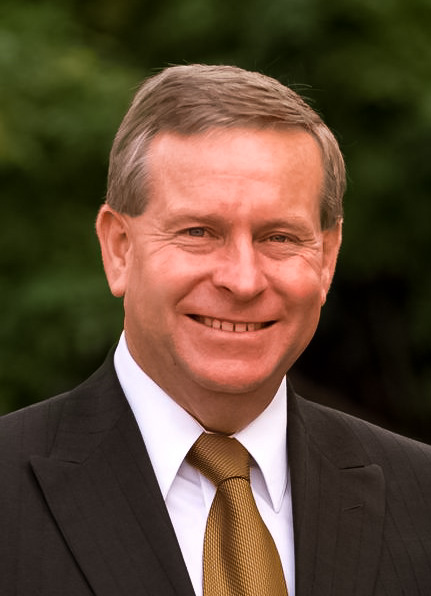

29th Premier of Western Australia
- In office 23 September 2008 – 17 March 2017
- Monarch: Elizabeth II
- Governor: Ken Michael; Malcolm McCusker; Kerry Sanderson
- Deputy: Kim Hames; Liza Harvey
- Preceded by: Alan Carpenter
- Succeeded by: Mark McGowan

Treasurer of Western Australia
- In office 27 April 2010 – 14 December 2010
- Preceded by: Troy Buswell
- Succeeded by: Christian Porter
- In office 12 June 2012 – 7 July 2012
- Preceded by: Christian Porter
- Succeeded by: Troy Buswell
- In office 10 March 2014 – 17 March 2014
- Preceded by: Troy Buswell
- Succeeded by: Mike Nahan

27th Leader of the Opposition in Western Australia Elections: 2005, 2008
- In office 26 February 2001 – 9 March 2005
- Deputy: Dan Sullivan
- Preceded by: Richard Court
- Succeeded by: Matt Birney
- In office 6 August 2008 – 23 September 2008
- Deputy: Kim Hames
- Preceded by: Troy Buswell
- Succeeded by: Eric Ripper
- In office 17 March 2017 – 21 March 2017
- Deputy: Liza Harvey
- Preceded by: Mark McGowan
- Succeeded by: Mike Nahan

Member of the Western Australian Parliament for Cottesloe
- In office 11 August 1990 – 5 February 2018
- Preceded by: Bill Hassell
- Succeeded by: David Honey

Personal details
- Born: Colin James Barnett; 15 July 1950 (age 76) Nedlands, Western Australia, Australia
- Party: Liberal Party
- Education: University of Western Australia
- Profession: Economist

Colin James Barnett AC (born 15 July 1950) is an Australian former politician who served as the 29th Premier of Western Australia from 2008 to 2017. He concurrently served as the state's Treasurer at several points during his tenure and had previously held various other portfolios in Western Australia's Court–Cowan ministry.

Barnett was born in Nedlands, Perth. He graduated from the University of Western Australia with an economics degree. Having lectured in economics at the Western Australian Institute of Technology and served as an executive director of the Western Australian Chamber of Commerce and Industry, he was elected to the Western Australian Legislative Assembly for the seat of Cottesloe at a by-election in 1990. Barnett served as a minister in the Court–Cowan Ministry from 1993 until its defeat at the 2001 election, after which he was made leader of the Liberal Party, replacing the outgoing premier, Richard Court. He resigned as leader after the unsuccessful 2005 election, but regained the position prior to the 2008 election, where he was elected premier. Barnett was sworn into office on 23 September 2008 by Ken Michael, the Governor of Western Australia at the time. At the 2013 election Barnett and his government were re-elected to a second term.

The Liberals were defeated at the 2017 election, and WA Labor's Mark McGowan succeeded Barnett as Premier. On 15 December 2017, Barnett announced his intention to resign from politics, which he did on 5 February 2018.

== Early life ==
Barnett was born in Nedlands, an inner western suburb of Perth, on 15 July 1950. He was educated at Nedlands Primary School and Hollywood Senior High School. He began studying geology at the University of Western Australia, but switched to an economics course from which he graduated with an honours degree and later a master's degree. In 1973, he became a cadet research officer for the Australian Bureau of Statistics in Canberra, being promoted to senior research officer before returning to Perth in 1975 to become a lecturer in Economics at the Western Australian Institute of Technology (later renamed Curtin University).

In 1981, he was seconded to the Confederation of Western Australian Industry, becoming the founding editor of their publication, Western Australian Economic Review. He was later appointed their chief economist, and served with them until 1985, when he became the executive director of the Western Australian Chamber of Commerce and Industry.

== Early political career ==
After former state Liberal leader Bill Hassell retired from politics in 1990, Barnett won the ensuing by-election in his old seat of Cottesloe. He had not previously been a member of the Liberal Party, only joining during the preselection process.

Despite this, Barnett was appointed to the shadow cabinet of Barry MacKinnon shortly after entering parliament, with responsibility for housing and works. He also added the fuel and energy portfolio in August 1991. In May 1992, MacKinnon was ousted in a party room coup by his deputy, Richard Court. Barnett ran for the deputy leadership against Cheryl Edwardes, and after an initial 16–16 tie was elected by lot. He retained responsibility for fuel and energy in the subsequent reshuffle of the shadow ministry, and was also given the state development portfolio.

== Court Government (1993–2001) ==
After Court led the Liberals to power at the 1993 state election, Barnett became Minister for Resources Development and Energy and later, Minister for Education and Minister for Tourism in the Court–Cowan Ministry. He was also the Leader of the House in the Legislative Assembly and remained deputy leader of the Liberal Party. He was generally regarded as a competent and successful minister, and was associated with a number of important resource development projects.

== Opposition (2001–2008) ==
The Court government was defeated at the 2001 election. Despite Barnett's reputation as a competent minister, he and Court had a somewhat frosty relationship. The two were factional rivals; Court is from the conservative wing of the Liberal Party while Barnett is a moderate. In hopes of keeping Barnett from succeeding him as Liberal leader, Court engineered a plan to have federal MP Julie Bishop succeed him instead. Under Court's plan, both he and Barnett would have resigned from the state legislature. Bishop would have resigned from federal parliament and handed her seat of Curtin, the safest Liberal seat in the Perth area, to Barnett. Bishop would have then run in the ensuing by-election for either Barnett's seat of Cottesloe or Court's seat of Nedlands, both reckoned as comfortably safe Liberal seats. Court would then hand leadership of the WA Liberals to Bishop once she was safely in state parliament. When Barnett found out about the plan, he claimed to have "choked on his Weet-Bix" at what he described as "an act of treachery or deceit." However, when Bishop rejected the plan, Court, finding himself in an untenable situation, resigned. Barnett then took the leadership after defeating his only opponent Rod Sweetman.

At the 2005 state election, Barnett proposed the construction of a canal from the rivers of the Kimberley Ranges in northern Western Australia to Perth to meet Perth's growing water supply problem. The proposal was costed by Barnett at A$2 billion, however it soon emerged that no feasibility study or detailed costings had been done. Some experts put the cost as high as A$5 billion. The Prime Minister, John Howard, refused to commit federal funds to the project. He released the policy costings only a few days before the election, when a A$200 million error in the costings document was discovered. When the Gallop government was returned with its majority intact, Barnett accepted responsibility for the defeat and resigned the Liberal leadership. On 9 March 2005 Liberal MPs elected Matt Birney, the member for Kalgoorlie, as Barnett's successor.

Barnett spent the next two years on the backbench—the first time in his career he had not been either a minister or opposition frontbencher. In November 2007, he announced that he would retire from politics at the next state election, at that stage due by May 2009.

== Premier (2008–2017) ==
=== WA Government ===
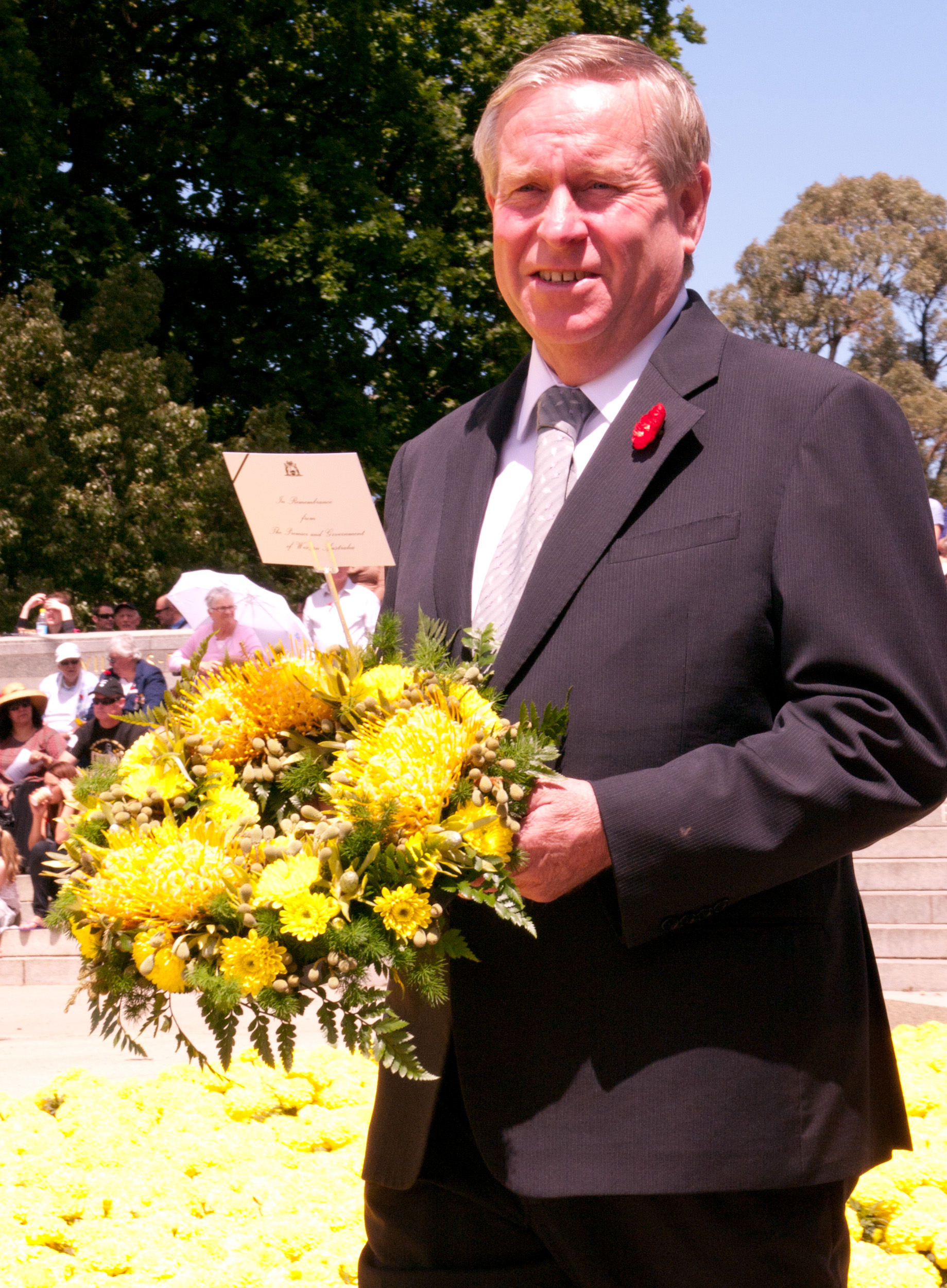
Barnett in 2012

On 4 August 2008, Troy Buswell resigned as Opposition Leader and two days later Barnett was re-elected unopposed to the Liberal leadership despite the fact that he had previously announced his retirement and Deidre Willmott (who would subsequently be appointed as his Chief of Staff) had been endorsed in his electorate. On 7 August 2008, Premier Alan Carpenter called an early election for 6 September 2008. Barnett led the Liberal Party to the election, which saw a significant swing away from the incumbent Labor Party, leading to a hung parliament. The balance of power rested with the WA Nationals. While the federal Liberals and Nationals are in Coalition at the federal level, the WA Nationals do not necessarily follow their federal counterparts' lead politically, and leader Brendon Grylls had torn up the Coalition agreement a year earlier. Knowing that Grylls was in a position to effectively choose the next premier, both Barnett and Carpenter courted the Nationals' support.

A week after the election, the Nationals agreed to support the Liberal Party as a minority government. As part of the deal, Grylls and two other Nationals, Terry Redman and Terry Waldron, accepted posts in Barnett's cabinet. However, the National ministers had only limited cabinet collective responsibility, unlike past Liberal-National coalitions in Western Australia (and at most levels in the rest of the country), and the Nationals reserved the right to vote against the government on issues that affected their electorates' interests. Additionally, Grylls declined to become Deputy Premier, a post which went to Liberal deputy leader Kim Hames. Carpenter resigned rather than face certain defeat on the floor of the Assembly, and Barnett was sworn into office on 23 September 2008.

Barnett was the sole state premier opposed to Labor Prime Minister Kevin Rudd's key Health reform policy deal at the April 2010 COAG meeting. Barnett at the time led the only Liberal State Government in Australia, while all others states were led by Labor governments. The reasoning for Barnett's strong opposition towards the reform was because it would require the State Governments to forfeit a proportion of their GST revenue. The Rudd government's proposal was that 30 per cent of the GST revenue pool was to be dedicated towards the Commonwealth's contribution for hospital services, which had a disproportionate impact on those States receiving a less than per capita share of the GST pool (for Western Australia, this would have resulted in an estimated 64 per cent of GST revenue being forfeit). Barnett had already been angered that Western Australia was given a decreased 7.1 percent amount of the GST revenue (lower than last year's revenue amount of 8.1 percent) while Western Australia is a state that will be heavily relied upon for the nation's economic growth due to its booming resource sector. Western Australia therefore would be heavily dependent on GST revenue to fund major resource sector projects although they would not be supported by GST revenue, thus becoming extensive expenditure for the state.

Barnett believed that if Western Australia had agreed to a proposition for the States to handover 30% of the GST revenue pool, the arrangement could eventually lead to the federal government being able to acquire 100% of the state's GST revenue. The reaction of Barnett towards the health reform has been considered by political writer Peter van Onselen as a preservation of the states' rights.

From 27 April 2010, Barnett held the Treasury Portfolio after the resignation of former Treasurer Troy Buswell. In a cabinet reshuffle he handed the portfolio to Christian Porter later that same year. Barnett returned to the treasury portfolio when Christian Porter suddenly decided to pursue a career in federal politics and resigned immediately from all his state ministerial portfolios on 12 June 2012. Porter's resignation saw Barnett serve as an interim Treasurer until he was officially replaced by Troy Buswell the following month on 7 July.

Barnett led the Liberals to victory in the 2013 state election, taking 31 seats on a swing of 8.8 points. This was theoretically enough for the Liberals to govern alone, and marked only the second time that the main non-Labor party in Western Australia had won a majority in its own right since adopting the Liberal banner in 1944. However, Barnett said after the election that the coalition with the WA Nationals would be retained. According to ABC election analyst Antony Green, Barnett would have been forced to keep the Nationals in his cabinet in any event. Even after the 2008 electoral reforms, rural areas were still significantly overrepresented in the Legislative Council. Green argued that the rural weighting in the Legislative Council was strong enough to make it politically impossible for a Liberal premier to govern without National support, even when the Liberals won enough Legislative Assembly seats to theoretically govern alone.

=== Controversial policies ===
In October 2004, Barnett led a campaign to raise the age of consent for homosexual acts from 16 to 18. This policy of recriminalisation was opposed by several major organisations, including Amnesty International, the World Health Organization, and the Australian Medical Association, as well as all other parliamentary parties, including the Nationals.

In October 2009, Barnett announced a series of new policies relating to drug legislation including a repeal of the Cannabis Control Act 2003. The previous laws were formulated by Geoff Gallop's drug summit, taking input from experts such as academics, police, social workers, lawyers, medical professionals and members of the public. Barnett has stated it is his intention to overturn these laws because of his beliefs and stated that the drug summit members made a mistake introducing them and that cannabis was a "gateway drug". To help with the enforcement of this new policy, Barnett also supported legislation to give police the power to search and seize property without any suspicion or belief that a crime has been committed. A Liberal parliamentarian, Peter Abetz, voiced support for these laws in parliament by drawing reference to the work Adolf Hitler did to bring security to Nazi Germany. Barnett said that Abetz was making a valid point.

In June 2013, Barnett said that Western Australia would not sign up to the Gillard government Gonski School Funding Reforms. Barnett said that he will not let the federal government govern schools.

In December 2013, Barnett announced a controversial plan for great white sharks to be shot and disposed of at sea if they come within one kilometre of the coast of Western Australia, while acknowledging broad dissent in the community.

In 2015, former Liberal leader Bill Hassell—who had preceded Barnett as the member for Cottesloe and "has a habit of excoriating Barnett in the media" according to The Australian—labelled Barnett a social liberal and a useful over-spender. Barnett claimed mining royalties were spent on "disability, mental health and other areas of social need". In December 2007 when former Liberal leader Barnett was once again a backbencher and contemplating political retirement, he claimed: "I'm disappointed that the Liberal Party has been taken over by hardline right-wingers" and "The party has become inflexible and has held a hard line on social issues, and that has not worked with 30-year-old voters" and "We should be more moderate on social issues. Saying sorry to Aboriginal people is part of that. We should have said sorry long ago".

=== 2016 leadership spill ===
On 17 September 2016, Local Government Minister Tony Simpson and Transport Minister Dean Nalder resigned from Cabinet. Subsequently, a motion to spill the leadership of the WA Liberal Party was brought by backbencher Murray Cowper. On 20 September, it was defeated 31 votes to 15. Nalder, who would have nominated against Barnett if the spill motion had passed, promised not to launch future leadership challenges.

=== 2017 election defeat and resignation from politics ===
Most polls since Barnett's landslide victory in 2013 showed the Barnett government well behind Labor. A Newspoll conducted from October to December 2015 and released in January 2016, revealing the government significantly trailing 47–53 two-party against the Labor opposition, representing a double-digit two-party swing of more than 10 points since the 2013 election. Had this been repeated at an election, it would have been more than enough to deny Barnett a third term. Just prior to the 2013 election, Barnett was nominated Better Premier with a 21-point lead on 52 percent, with an approval rating of 51 percent and a disapproval rating of 36 percent. Since then, Labor leader Mark McGowan has consistently led Barnett as Better Premier by several percent, with Barnett's approval rating consistently low, currently at 33 percent, with his disapproval rating consistently high, currently at 54 percent.

On 11 March 2017, Barnett was swept from power in the largest defeat of a sitting government in Western Australia's history. The Coalition suffered a swing of 12.6 percent and lost 20 seats. Seven members of Barnett's cabinet, including Grylls, were defeated. The Coalition took a particularly severe beating in Perth. It went into the election holding 26 of the capital's 43 seats, but many Liberals in the outer suburbs sat on inflated margins. The Liberals suffered a 13.6 percent swing in Perth, and were cut down to just nine seats there, including Barnett's. Accepting responsibility for one of the worst defeats of a sitting state or territory government since Federation, Barnett resigned as Liberal leader and returned to the backbench. He was succeeded as WA Liberal leader by his former Treasurer, Mike Nahan.

On 15 December 2017, Barnett announced his intention to retire from politics after Australia Day 2018. He resigned on 5 February 2018, triggering a by-election in his seat of Cottesloe.

In December 2019, Barnett criticised Home Affairs Minister Peter Dutton for stating that the values of the Chinese Communist Party are "inconsistent" with Australian values.

== Honours ==
Barnett was appointed as a Companion of the Order of Australia in the 2023 King's Birthday Honours for "eminent service to the people and Parliament of Western Australia, particularly as premier, to economic and infrastructure development, to social welfare reform, and to the Indigenous community".

== See also ==
- Barnett Ministry

Parliament of Western Australia
Preceded by Bill Hassell	Member for Cottesloe; 1990–2018	Succeeded by David Honey
Party political offices
Preceded by Richard Court; Troy Buswell	Leader of the Liberal Party in Western Australia; 2001–2005; 2008–2017	Succeeded by Matt Birney; Mike Nahan
Political offices
Preceded by Richard Court; Troy Buswell; Mark McGowan	Leader of the Opposition of Western Australia; 2001–2005; 2008; 2017	Succeeded by Matt Birney; Eric Ripper; Mike Nahan
Preceded by Alan Carpenter	Premier of Western Australia; 2008–2017	Succeeded by Mark McGowan
