= Electoral results for the district of Joondalup =

Western Australian district election results

This is a list of electoral results for the electoral district of Joondalup in Western Australian state elections.

== Members for Joondalup ==
Joondalup (1983–1989)
| Member | Party | Term |
|---|---|---|
| Jackie Watkins | Labor | 1983–1989 |
Joondalup (1996–present)
| Member | Party | Term |
| Chris Baker | Liberal | 1996–2001 |
| Tony O'Gorman | Labor | 2001–2013 |
| Jan Norberger | Liberal | 2013–2017 |
| Emily Hamilton | Labor | 2017–present |

== Election results ==
=== Elections in the 2020s ===
2025 Western Australian state election: Joondalup
| Party | Candidate | Votes | % | ±% |
|---|---|---|---|---|
| Labor | Emily Hamilton | 12,274 | 44.0 | −22.5 |
| Liberal | Michael Dudek | 9,782 | 35.1 | +15.9 |
| Greens | Brian Sova | 2,229 | 8.0 | +3.4 |
| Christians | Trevor Bartley | 927 | 3.3 | +1.0 |
| Legalise Cannabis | Samantha Law | 847 | 3.0 | +1.4 |
| Animal Justice | Neil Jensen | 612 | 2.2 | +2.2 |
| Independent | Nicole Butler | 561 | 2.0 | +2.0 |
| Shooters, Fishers, Farmers | Michael Kannis | 337 | 1.2 | +1.2 |
| Stop Pedophiles | M. Waghorn | 323 | 1.2 | +1.2 |
| Total formal votes | | 27,892 | 95.8 | −0.5 |
| Informal votes | | 1,226 | 4.2 | +0.5 |
| Turnout | | 29,118 | 88.1 | +3.9 |
Two-party-preferred result
| Labor | Emily Hamilton | 15,685 | 56.3 | −19.2 |
| Liberal | Michael Dudek | 12,196 | 43.7 | +19.2 |
| Labor hold | | Swing | −19.2 | |

Results are not final. Last updated on 31 March 2025 at 6:30 PM AWST

2021 Western Australian state election: Joondalup
| Party | Candidate | Votes | % | ±% |
|---|---|---|---|---|
| Labor | Emily Hamilton | 15,892 | 65.4 | +25.2 |
| Liberal | Sheldon Ingham | 4,756 | 19.6 | −24.2 |
| Greens | Angelo Watts | 1,102 | 4.5 | −4.0 |
| Christians | Shanthi Hildebrandt | 537 | 2.2 | +0.5 |
| Independent | Ziggi Murphy | 484 | 2.0 | +2.0 |
| Legalise Cannabis | Bret Treasure | 465 | 1.9 | +1.9 |
| No Mandatory Vaccination | Howard Davey | 334 | 1.4 | +1.4 |
| Liberal Democrats | Peter McLoughlin | 286 | 1.2 | +1.2 |
| WAxit | Jules Rikkers | 240 | 1.0 | +0.2 |
| Western Australia | Peter Westcott | 203 | 0.8 | −0.3 |
| Total formal votes | | 24,299 | 96.2 | +0.8 |
| Informal votes | | 948 | 3.8 | −0.8 |
| Turnout | | 25,247 | 87.3 | +1.5 |
Two-party-preferred result
| Labor | Emily Hamilton | 18,150 | 74.7 | +24.7 |
| Liberal | Sheldon Ingham | 6,137 | 25.3 | −24.7 |
| Labor hold | | Swing | +24.7 | |

=== Elections in the 2010s ===
2017 Western Australian state election: Joondalup
| Party | Candidate | Votes | % | ±% |
|---|---|---|---|---|
| Liberal | Jan Norberger | 10,037 | 43.3 | −13.1 |
| Labor | Emily Hamilton | 9,423 | 40.6 | +7.6 |
| Greens | Lisa Webb | 2,009 | 8.7 | +0.4 |
| Independent | Brian Brightman | 703 | 3.0 | +3.0 |
| Christians | Rex Host | 387 | 1.7 | −0.3 |
| Family First | Nicholas Hart | 277 | 1.2 | +0.8 |
| Micro Business | Peter Martin | 185 | 0.8 | +0.8 |
| Matheson for WA | Aaron Malloy | 183 | 0.8 | +0.8 |
| Total formal votes | | 23,204 | 95.6 | +1.8 |
| Informal votes | | 1,070 | 4.4 | −1.8 |
| Turnout | | 24,274 | 88.3 | −0.9 |
Two-party-preferred result
| Labor | Emily Hamilton | 11,737 | 50.6 | +11.0 |
| Liberal | Jan Norberger | 11,460 | 49.4 | −11.0 |
| Labor gain from Liberal | | Swing | +11.0 | |

2013 Western Australian state election: Joondalup
| Party | Candidate | Votes | % | ±% |
|---|---|---|---|---|
| Liberal | Jan Norberger | 9,961 | 50.3 | +11.9 |
| Labor | Tony O'Gorman | 7,519 | 37.9 | –3.9 |
| Greens | Brittany Young | 1,837 | 9.3 | –3.6 |
| Christians | Geoff McDavitt | 503 | 2.5 | –0.7 |
| Total formal votes | | 19,820 | 93.6 | −0.8 |
| Informal votes | | 1,349 | 6.4 | +0.8 |
| Turnout | | 21,169 | 88.8 | |
Two-party-preferred result
| Liberal | Jan Norberger | 10,796 | 54.5 | +7.8 |
| Labor | Tony O'Gorman | 9,023 | 45.5 | –7.8 |
| Liberal gain from Labor | | Swing | +7.8 | |

=== Elections in the 2000s ===
2008 Western Australian state election: Joondalup
| Party | Candidate | Votes | % | ±% |
|---|---|---|---|---|
| Labor | Tony O'Gorman | 7,788 | 41.8 | −3.8 |
| Liberal | Milly Zuvela | 7,083 | 38.1 | +1.0 |
| Greens | Anibeth Desierto | 2,431 | 13.1 | +5.8 |
| Family First | Nathan Clifford | 711 | 3.8 | +0.6 |
| Christian Democrats | Margaret Laundy | 600 | 3.2 | +0.8 |
| Total formal votes | | 18,613 | 94.4 | −0.6 |
| Informal votes | | 1,101 | 5.6 | +0.6 |
| Turnout | | 19,714 | 85.9 | |
Two-party-preferred result
| Labor | Tony O'Gorman | 9,950 | 53.5 | −0.8 |
| Liberal | Milly Zuvela | 8,655 | 46.5 | +0.8 |
| Labor hold | | Swing | −0.8 | |

2005 Western Australian state election: Joondalup
| Party | Candidate | Votes | % | ±% |
|---|---|---|---|---|
| Labor | Tony O'Gorman | 10,085 | 44.9 | +6.0 |
| Liberal | Dean Solly | 8,604 | 38.3 | +1.9 |
| Greens | Leon van der Linde | 1,625 | 7.2 | −2.4 |
| Independent | Michael Clancy | 902 | 4.0 | +4.0 |
| Family First | Fred Hay | 725 | 3.2 | +3.2 |
| Christian Democrats | Helen Sawyer | 528 | 2.3 | −0.9 |
| Total formal votes | | 22,469 | 94.9 | −0.2 |
| Informal votes | | 1,206 | 5.1 | +0.2 |
| Turnout | | 23,675 | 90.9 | |
Two-party-preferred result
| Labor | Tony O'Gorman | 11,960 | 53.3 | +0.2 |
| Liberal | Dean Solly | 10,492 | 46.7 | −0.2 |
| Labor hold | | Swing | +0.2 | |

2001 Western Australian state election: Joondalup
| Party | Candidate | Votes | % | ±% |
|---|---|---|---|---|
| Liberal | Chris Baker | 10,124 | 39.1 | −8.4 |
| Labor | Tony O'Gorman | 9,742 | 37.6 | +2.6 |
| Greens | Steve Magyar | 2,345 | 9.1 | +2.2 |
| One Nation | Jeanette Radisich | 1,788 | 6.9 | +6.9 |
| Christian Democrats | Helen Sawyer | 818 | 3.2 | +3.2 |
| Democrats | Sarah Gilfillan | 810 | 3.1 | −2.5 |
| Seniors Party | Michael Mortimer | 254 | 1.0 | +1.0 |
| Total formal votes | | 25,881 | 95.8 | +0.1 |
| Informal votes | | 1,124 | 4.2 | −0.1 |
| Turnout | | 27,005 | 92.2 | |
Two-party-preferred result
| Labor | Tony O'Gorman | 13,035 | 50.8 | +6.3 |
| Liberal | Chris Baker | 12,649 | 49.2 | −6.3 |
| Labor gain from Liberal | | Swing | +6.3 | |

=== Elections in the 1990s ===
1996 Western Australian state election: Joondalup
| Party | Candidate | Votes | % | ±% |
|---|---|---|---|---|
| Liberal | Chris Baker | 10,557 | 47.5 | +4.0 |
| Labor | Dianne Guise | 7,777 | 35.0 | −5.8 |
| Greens | Steve Magyar | 1,527 | 6.9 | +2.0 |
| Democrats | Sarah Gilfillan | 1,238 | 5.6 | +3.1 |
| Marijuana | Leigh Smith | 809 | 3.6 | +3.6 |
| Australian People's Party | Peter Rowlands | 326 | 1.5 | +1.5 |
| Total formal votes | | 22,234 | 95.8 | −0.7 |
| Informal votes | | 983 | 4.2 | +0.7 |
| Turnout | | 23,217 | 91.5 | |
Two-party-preferred result
| Liberal | Chris Baker | 12,318 | 55.5 | +4.0 |
| Labor | Dianne Guise | 9,884 | 44.5 | −4.0 |
| Liberal hold | | Swing | +4.0 | |

=== Elections in the 1980s ===
1986 Western Australian state election: Joondalup
| Party | Candidate | Votes | % | ±% |
|---|---|---|---|---|
| Labor | Jackie Watkins | 14,900 | 56.9 | +0.2 |
| Liberal | Mick Nanovich | 9,973 | 38.1 | −5.2 |
| Independent | Vida Wright | 848 | 3.2 | +3.2 |
| Democrats | Harry Frochter | 478 | 1.8 | +1.8 |
| Total formal votes | | 26,199 | 97.6 | −0.1 |
| Informal votes | | 634 | 2.4 | +0.1 |
| Turnout | | 26,833 | 93.3 | +3.5 |
Two-party-preferred result
| Labor | Jackie Watkins | 15,588 | 59.5 | +2.8 |
| Liberal | Mick Nanovich | 10,611 | 40.5 | −2.8 |
| Labor hold | | Swing | +2.8 | |

1983 Western Australian state election: Joondalup
| Party | Candidate | Votes | % | ±% |
|---|---|---|---|---|
| Labor | Jackie Watkins | 8,785 | 56.7 | |
| Liberal | Mick Nanovich | 6,698 | 43.3 | |
| Total formal votes | | 15,483 | 97.7 | |
| Informal votes | | 367 | 2.3 | |
| Turnout | | 15,850 | 89.8 | |
| Labor hold | | Swing | | |
