= Electoral results for the district of Wanneroo =

Western Australian district election results

This is a list of electoral results for the electoral district of Wanneroo in Western Australian state elections.

== Members for Wanneroo ==
Member	Party	Term
Jackie Watkins	Labor	1989–1993
Wayde Smith	Liberal	1993–1996
Iain MacLean	Liberal	1996–2001
Dianne Guise	Labor	2001–2008
Paul Miles	Liberal	2008–2017
Sabine Winton	Labor	2017–present

== Election results ==
=== Elections in the 2020s ===
2025 Western Australian state election: Wanneroo
Party	Candidate	Votes	%	±%
Labor	Sabine Winton	13,585	50.9	−21.0
Liberal	Joshua Kingshott	7,557	28.3	+10.0
Greens	Martin Dupont	2,302	8.6	+4.1
Legalise Cannabis	Kunal Naresh Parbat	1,367	5.1	+5.1
Christians	Hendrik Holtzhausen	1,244	4.7	+4.7
Shooters, Fishers, Farmers	Trevor Ruwoldt	629	2.4	+2.4
Total formal votes		26,684	95.2	−0.5
Informal votes		1,342	4.8	+0.5
Turnout		28,026	84.7	+3.5
Two-party-preferred result
Labor	Sabine Winton	16,661	62.5	−16.0
Liberal	Joshua Kingshott	10,013	37.5	+16.0
Labor hold		Swing	−16.0	

2021 Western Australian state election: Wanneroo
Party	Candidate	Votes	%	±%
Labor	Sabine Winton	18,366	71.8	+24.4
Liberal	Paul Miles	4,686	18.3	−11.3
Greens	Matthew Ward	1,150	4.5	−3.2
No Mandatory Vaccination	J. Bullock	637	2.5	+2.5
Western Australia	Lilian Siviour	404	1.6	+0.5
WAxit	Sandy Culum-Buzak	335	1.3	+0.8
Total formal votes		25,578	95.7	+0.2
Informal votes		1,152	4.3	−0.2
Turnout		26,730	85.4	+5.2
Two-party-preferred result
Labor	Sabine Winton	20,059	78.4	+19.8
Liberal	Paul Miles	5,516	21.6	−19.8
Labor hold		Swing	+19.8	

=== Elections in the 2010s ===
2017 Western Australian state election: Wanneroo
Party	Candidate	Votes	%	±%
Labor	Sabine Winton	10,930	46.8	+14.5
Liberal	Paul Miles	7,017	30.1	−25.5
One Nation	Joseph Darcy	2,288	9.8	+9.8
Greens	Robyn Treacy	1,552	6.6	−0.9
Christians	Linley Pass	629	2.7	+0.1
Independent	Max Wilson	595	2.5	+2.5
Micro Business	Peter Rosengrave	173	0.7	+0.7
Matheson for WA	Greg Macpherson	160	0.7	+0.7
Total formal votes		23,344	95.9	+2.5
Informal votes		996	4.1	−2.5
Turnout		24,340	88.1	+3.6
Two-party-preferred result
Labor	Sabine Winton	13,361	57.3	+18.2
Liberal	Paul Miles	9,975	42.7	−18.2
Labor gain from Liberal		Swing	+18.2	

2013 Western Australian state election: Wanneroo
Party	Candidate	Votes	%	±%
Liberal	Paul Miles	11,932	55.7	+11.8
Labor	Brett Treby	6,887	32.1	–7.4
Greens	Rob Phillips	1,611	7.5	–1.5
Christians	Meg Birch	550	2.6	+0.2
Family First	Moyna Rapp	446	2.1	–1.0
Total formal votes		21,426	93.4	−1.4
Informal votes		1,504	6.6	+1.4
Turnout		22,930	90.3	
Two-party-preferred result
Liberal	Paul Miles	13,089	61.1	+10.2
Labor	Brett Treby	8,328	38.9	–10.2
Liberal hold		Swing	+10.2	

=== Elections in the 2000s ===
2008 Western Australian state election: Wanneroo
Party	Candidate	Votes	%	±%
Liberal	Paul Miles	9,849	43.7	+7.7
Labor	Dianne Guise	8,990	39.9	−9.7
Greens	Heather Aquilina	1,974	8.8	+4.1
Family First	Rod Grasso	640	2.8	−1.2
Christian Democrats	Mary Birch	599	2.7	+0.4
Independent	Russell Sewell	496	2.2	+2.2
Total formal votes		22,548	94.9	+0.2
Informal votes		1,223	5.1	−0.2
Turnout		23,771	88.9	
Two-party-preferred result
Liberal	Paul Miles	11,429	50.7	+6.9
Labor	Dianne Guise	11,107	49.3	−6.9
Liberal gain from Labor		Swing	+6.9	

2005 Western Australian state election: Wanneroo
Party	Candidate	Votes	%	±%
Labor	Dianne Guise	13,537	49.9	+10.7
Liberal	Paul Miles	9,663	35.6	−1.0
Greens	Marija Pericic	1,281	4.7	−1.1
Family First	Robert Green	1,026	3.8	+3.8
Christian Democrats	Seb Gerbaz	626	2.3	+2.3
Independent	Anne Cowley	514	1.9	+1.9
One Nation	Marye Daniels	478	1.8	−9.2
Total formal votes		27,125	94.5	−0.3
Informal votes		1,566	5.5	+0.3
Turnout		28,691	91.3	
Two-party-preferred result
Labor	Dianne Guise	15,377	56.7	+3.6
Liberal	Paul Miles	11,733	43.3	−3.6
Labor hold		Swing	+3.6	

2001 Western Australian state election: Wanneroo
Party	Candidate	Votes	%	±%
Labor	Dianne Guise	14,126	42.9	+3.0
Liberal	Iain MacLean	11,352	34.4	−10.4
One Nation	Ron Holt	3,221	9.8	+9.8
Greens	Miguel Castillo	1,880	5.7	−2.3
Independent	Dave Fort	1,064	3.2	+3.2
Democrats	Patti Lock	974	3.0	−4.2
Seniors Party	Eric Couzens	344	1.0	+1.0
Total formal votes		32,961	94.4	−0.8
Informal votes		1,942	5.6	+0.8
Turnout		34,903	92.5	
Two-party-preferred result
Labor	Dianne Guise	18,266	55.9	+7.5
Liberal	Iain MacLean	14,408	44.1	−7.5
Labor gain from Liberal		Swing	+7.5	

=== Elections in the 1990s ===
1996 Western Australian state election: Wanneroo
Party	Candidate	Votes	%	±%
Liberal	Iain MacLean	11,252	44.8	+1.2
Labor	Liz Prime	10,023	39.9	−2.3
Greens	Miguel Castillo	2,011	8.0	+3.7
Democrats	Jeanette Grieves	1,815	7.2	+6.1
Total formal votes		25,101	95.2	−0.2
Informal votes		1,266	4.8	+0.2
Turnout		26,367	91.8	
Two-party-preferred result
Liberal	Iain MacLean	12,919	51.6	+0.6
Labor	Liz Prime	12,123	48.4	−0.6
Liberal hold		Swing	+0.6	

1993 Western Australian state election: Wanneroo
Party	Candidate	Votes	%	±%
Liberal	Wayde Smith	10,529	43.6	+3.4
Labor	Jackie Watkins	9,968	41.3	−5.8
Greens	Stephen Magyar	1,146	4.7	+4.7
Independent	Terry Bolden	578	2.4	+2.4
Independent	William Duffy	558	2.3	+2.3
Independent	Ronald Palmer	447	1.9	+1.9
Democrats	Bronwyn Jones	406	1.7	+1.7
Call to Australia	Ronald Holt	391	1.6	+1.6
Independent	Michael O'Brien	138	0.6	+0.6
Total formal votes		24,161	95.8	+3.8
Informal votes		1,068	4.2	−3.8
Turnout		25,229	94.9	+2.7
Two-party-preferred result
Liberal	Wayde Smith	12,397	51.3	+2.9
Labor	Jackie Watkins	11,764	48.7	−2.9
Liberal gain from Labor		Swing	+2.9	

=== Elections in the 1980s ===
1989 Western Australian state election: Wanneroo
Party	Candidate	Votes	%	±%
Labor	Jackie Watkins	7,613	47.1	−9.4
Liberal	Brian Cooper	6,497	40.2	+2.3
Grey Power	Peter Rowlands	1,169	7.2	+7.2
Independent	Henrietta Waters	897	5.6	+5.6
Total formal votes		16,176	92.0	
Informal votes		1,403	8.0	
Turnout		17,579	92.2	
Two-party-preferred result
Labor	Jackie Watkins	8,349	51.6	−7.3
Liberal	Brian Cooper	7,827	48.4	+7.3
Labor hold		Swing	−7.3	
