= Results of the 1993 Western Australian state election (Legislative Assembly) =

Western Australian state election, 6 February 1993 Legislative Assembly << 1989–1996 >>
| Enrolled voters | 1,016,750 | | | | |
| Votes cast | 950,698 | | Turnout | 93.50% | +2.77% |
| Informal votes | 39,220 | | Informal | 4.13% | –3.22% |
Summary of votes by party
| Party | Primary votes | % | Swing | Seats | Change |
| Liberal | 402,402 | 44.15% | +1.36% | 26 | + 6 |
| Labor | 338,008 | 37.08% | –5.38% | 24 | – 7 |
| National | 48,394 | 5.31% | +0.71% | 6 | ± 0 |
| Greens | 39,300 | 4.31% | +3.78% | 0 | ± 0 |
| Democrats | 21,147 | 2.32% | +0.89% | 0 | ± 0 |
| Other parties | 2,662 | 0.29% | –4.90% | 0 | ± 0 |
| Independent^{[1]} | 59,182 | 6.49% | +3.59% | 1 | + 1 |
| Total | 911,478 | | | 57 | |
Two-party-preferred
| Liberal/National | 505,391 | 55.45% | +3.07% | | |
| Labor | 406,087 | 44.55% | –3.07% | | |

This is a list of electoral district results of the 1993 Western Australian election.

== Results by electoral district ==
=== Albany ===
1993 Western Australian state election: Albany
| Party | Candidate | Votes | % | ±% |
|---|---|---|---|---|
| Liberal | Kevin Prince | 3,334 | 32.7 | −14.9 |
| Labor | Ursula Richards | 3,101 | 30.4 | −6.5 |
| National | Malcolm Cameron | 2,789 | 27.4 | +11.9 |
| Democrats | Roland Paver | 297 | 2.9 | +2.9 |
| Independent | Drew Posthuma | 247 | 2.4 | +2.4 |
| Independent | Robert Howard | 235 | 2.3 | +2.3 |
| CALM Resistance Movement | Alf Sharp | 184 | 1.8 | +1.8 |
| Total formal votes | | 10,187 | 95.4 | +1.8 |
| Informal votes | | 492 | 4.6 | −1.8 |
| Turnout | | 10,679 | 94.6 | +1.8 |
Two-party-preferred result
| Liberal | Kevin Prince | 6,108 | 60.0 | −0.1 |
| Labor | Ursula Richards | 4,079 | 40.0 | +0.1 |
| Liberal hold | | Swing | −0.1 | |

=== Applecross ===
1993 Western Australian state election: Applecross
| Party | Candidate | Votes | % | ±% |
|---|---|---|---|---|
| Liberal | Richard Lewis | 15,135 | 67.5 | +4.4 |
| Labor | Maryla Rowcroft | 5,437 | 24.3 | −4.0 |
| Democrats | Anne Millar | 1,834 | 8.2 | +8.2 |
| Total formal votes | | 22,406 | 96.8 | +2.4 |
| Informal votes | | 744 | 3.2 | −2.4 |
| Turnout | | 23,150 | 94.8 | +2.5 |
Two-party-preferred result
| Liberal | Richard Lewis | 15,968 | 71.3 | +2.2 |
| Labor | Maryla Rowcroft | 6,438 | 28.7 | −2.2 |
| Liberal hold | | Swing | +2.2 | |

=== Armadale ===
1993 Western Australian state election: Armadale
| Party | Candidate | Votes | % | ±% |
|---|---|---|---|---|
| Labor | Kay Hallahan | 9,413 | 48.4 | +0.7 |
| Liberal | Maureen Healy | 7,372 | 37.9 | −0.3 |
| Independent | Kenneth Williamson | 794 | 4.1 | +4.1 |
| Democrats | Fred Miller | 456 | 2.3 | +2.3 |
| | Zac Schonberg | 453 | 2.3 | +2.3 |
| Independent | Ivan Talbot | 412 | 2.1 | +2.1 |
| Independent | William Higgins | 313 | 1.6 | +1.6 |
| Independent | Tammo Hoover | 249 | 1.3 | +1.3 |
| Total formal votes | | 19,462 | 94.8 | +4.2 |
| Informal votes | | 1,077 | 5.2 | −4.2 |
| Turnout | | 20,539 | 94.3 | +2.4 |
Two-party-preferred result
| Labor | Kay Hallahan | 10,757 | 55.3 | +2.2 |
| Liberal | Maureen Healy | 8,705 | 44.7 | −2.2 |
| Labor hold | | Swing | +2.2 | |

=== Ashburton ===
1993 Western Australian state election: Ashburton
| Party | Candidate | Votes | % | ±% |
|---|---|---|---|---|
| Labor | Fred Riebeling | 4,088 | 52.9 | −0.6 |
| Liberal | Joy West | 2,923 | 37.9 | −0.2 |
| Greens | Hugh Paterson | 712 | 9.2 | +9.2 |
| Total formal votes | | 7,723 | 95.9 | +2.9 |
| Informal votes | | 330 | 4.1 | −2.9 |
| Turnout | | 8,053 | 88.2 | +7.8 |
Two-party-preferred result
| Labor | Fred Riebeling | 4,490 | 58.1 | +0.2 |
| Liberal | Joy West | 3,233 | 41.9 | −0.2 |
| Labor hold | | Swing | +0.2 | |

=== Avon ===
1993 Western Australian state election: Avon
| Party | Candidate | Votes | % | ±% |
|---|---|---|---|---|
| National | Max Trenorden | 4,555 | 38.8 | −0.7 |
| Labor | Walerjan Sieczka | 3,403 | 29.0 | −2.7 |
| Liberal | Bevan Henderson | 2,751 | 23.4 | −5.4 |
| Independent | Paul Maycock | 1,030 | 8.8 | +8.8 |
| Total formal votes | | 11,739 | 96.4 | +3.3 |
| Informal votes | | 439 | 3.6 | −3.3 |
| Turnout | | 12,178 | 94.2 | +2.5 |
Two-party-preferred result
| National | Max Trenorden | 7,750 | 66.0 | 0.0 |
| Labor | Walerjan Sieczka | 3,989 | 34.0 | 0.0 |
| National hold | | Swing | 0.0 | |

=== Balcatta ===
1993 Western Australian state election: Balcatta
| Party | Candidate | Votes | % | ±% |
|---|---|---|---|---|
| Labor | Nick Catania | 9,157 | 48.9 | −2.5 |
| Liberal | Katie Hodson-Thomas | 7,892 | 42.1 | +0.9 |
| Greens | Jack Geneff | 1,009 | 5.4 | +5.4 |
| Democrats | Yvette Heath | 670 | 3.6 | +3.6 |
| Total formal votes | | 18,728 | 95.0 | +5.9 |
| Informal votes | | 988 | 5.0 | −5.9 |
| Turnout | | 19,716 | 93.8 | +2.1 |
Two-party-preferred result
| Labor | Nick Catania | 10,195 | 54.4 | +0.4 |
| Liberal | Katie Hodson-Thomas | 8,533 | 45.6 | −0.4 |
| Labor hold | | Swing | +0.4 | |

=== Belmont ===
1993 Western Australian state election: Belmont
| Party | Candidate | Votes | % | ±% |
|---|---|---|---|---|
| Labor | Eric Ripper | 8,710 | 48.8 | −4.2 |
| Liberal | Don Randall | 6,941 | 38.9 | +7.0 |
| Independent | Malcolm Meikle | 967 | 5.4 | +5.4 |
| Greens | John Riordan | 821 | 4.6 | +4.6 |
| Democrats | Kathleen Hill | 414 | 2.3 | −1.8 |
| Total formal votes | | 17,853 | 94.9 | +7.0 |
| Informal votes | | 953 | 5.1 | −7.0 |
| Turnout | | 18,806 | 93.7 | +2.1 |
Two-party-preferred result
| Labor | Eric Ripper | 9,789 | 54.8 | −5.7 |
| Liberal | Don Randall | 8,064 | 45.2 | +5.7 |
| Labor hold | | Swing | −5.7 | |

=== Bunbury ===
1993 Western Australian state election: Bunbury
| Party | Candidate | Votes | % | ±% |
|---|---|---|---|---|
| Liberal | Ian Osborne | 4,659 | 47.3 | +4.3 |
| Labor | Phil Smith | 4,190 | 42.5 | −5.2 |
| Greens | Marilyn Palmer | 671 | 6.8 | +6.8 |
| Independent | Ronald Waldron | 333 | 3.4 | +3.4 |
| Total formal votes | | 9,853 | 96.8 | +2.5 |
| Informal votes | | 328 | 3.2 | −2.5 |
| Turnout | | 10,181 | 95.2 | +3.7 |
Two-party-preferred result
| Liberal | Ian Osborne | 5,084 | 51.6 | +3.1 |
| Labor | Phil Smith | 4,769 | 48.4 | −3.1 |
| Liberal gain from Labor | | Swing | +3.1 | |

=== Cockburn ===
1993 Western Australian state election: Cockburn
| Party | Candidate | Votes | % | ±% |
|---|---|---|---|---|
| Labor | Bill Thomas | 10,578 | 58.2 | −0.2 |
| Liberal | Janette McTaggart | 5,944 | 32.7 | +2.5 |
| Greens | Margaret-Mary Jenkins | 1,046 | 5.8 | +5.8 |
| Democrats | Lynda Somers | 623 | 3.4 | +3.4 |
| Total formal votes | | 18,191 | 94.1 | +7.0 |
| Informal votes | | 1,134 | 5.9 | −7.0 |
| Turnout | | 19,325 | 94.6 | +2.1 |
Two-party-preferred result
| Labor | Bill Thomas | 11,648 | 64.0 | −0.6 |
| Liberal | Janette McTaggart | 6,543 | 36.0 | +0.6 |
| Labor hold | | Swing | −0.6 | |

=== Collie ===
1993 Western Australian state election: Collie
| Party | Candidate | Votes | % | ±% |
|---|---|---|---|---|
| Labor | Mick Murray | 4,280 | 42.2 | −1.2 |
| National | Hilda Turnbull | 4,054 | 39.9 | +9.0 |
| Liberal | Harald Peterson | 1,427 | 14.1 | −6.9 |
| Democrats | Sandra Churches | 172 | 1.7 | −1.6 |
| Independent | Adrianus Hladio | 124 | 1.2 | +1.2 |
| Independent | Alfred Bussell | 94 | 0.9 | −0.5 |
| Total formal votes | | 10,151 | 96.4 | +2.3 |
| Informal votes | | 374 | 3.6 | −2.3 |
| Turnout | | 10,525 | 94.9 | +2.0 |
Two-party-preferred result
| National | Hilda Turnbull | 5,635 | 55.5 | +2.6 |
| Labor | Mick Murray | 4,516 | 44.5 | −2.6 |
| National hold | | Swing | +2.6 | |

=== Cottesloe ===
1993 Western Australian state election: Cottesloe
| Party | Candidate | Votes | % | ±% |
|---|---|---|---|---|
| Liberal | Colin Barnett | 12,503 | 65.0 | +5.5 |
| Labor | James Wearne | 3,943 | 20.5 | −5.9 |
| Greens | Giz Watson | 2,047 | 10.6 | +10.6 |
| Democrats | Michael Barrett | 748 | 3.9 | −3.3 |
| Total formal votes | | 19,241 | 97.5 | +2.6 |
| Informal votes | | 501 | 2.5 | −2.6 |
| Turnout | | 19,742 | 92.9 | +4.1 |
Two-party-preferred result
| Liberal | Colin Barnett | 13,699 | 71.2 | +4.4 |
| Labor | James Wearne | 5,542 | 28.8 | −4.4 |
| Liberal hold | | Swing | +4.4 | |

=== Darling Range ===
1993 Western Australian state election: Darling Range
| Party | Candidate | Votes | % | ±% |
|---|---|---|---|---|
| Liberal | John Day | 9,775 | 53.8 | −7.3 |
| Labor | James Christie | 3,771 | 20.8 | −8.7 |
| Independent | Wiebe Tielman | 1,846 | 10.2 | +10.2 |
| Greens | Janet Taciak | 986 | 5.4 | +5.4 |
| Independent | Peter Marjoram | 834 | 4.6 | +4.6 |
| Independent | Maura Howlett | 557 | 3.1 | +3.1 |
| Democrats | Peter Lambert | 386 | 2.1 | +2.1 |
| Total formal votes | | 18,155 | 95.9 | +1.6 |
| Informal votes | | 770 | 4.1 | −1.6 |
| Turnout | | 18,925 | 93.9 | +2.4 |
Two-party-preferred result
| Liberal | John Day | 12,397 | 68.3 | +0.6 |
| Labor | James Christie | 5,758 | 31.7 | −0.6 |
| Liberal hold | | Swing | +0.6 | |

=== Dianella ===
1993 Western Australian state election: Dianella
| Party | Candidate | Votes | % | ±% |
|---|---|---|---|---|
| Liberal | Kim Hames | 8,711 | 46.7 | +2.6 |
| Labor | Keith Wilson | 7,998 | 42.9 | −3.1 |
| Independent | Marguerite Henshaw | 876 | 4.7 | +4.7 |
| Greens | Edwin Speed | 670 | 3.6 | +3.6 |
| Democrats | Stewart Godden | 382 | 2.1 | +2.1 |
| Total formal votes | | 18,637 | 96.0 | +4.2 |
| Informal votes | | 766 | 4.0 | −4.2 |
| Turnout | | 19,403 | 94.2 | +2.4 |
Two-party-preferred result
| Liberal | Kim Hames | 9,572 | 51.4 | +2.5 |
| Labor | Keith Wilson | 9,065 | 48.6 | −2.5 |
| Liberal gain from Labor | | Swing | +2.5 | |

=== Eyre ===
1993 Western Australian state election: Eyre
| Party | Candidate | Votes | % | ±% |
|---|---|---|---|---|
| Labor | Julian Grill | 5,137 | 54.1 | −3.6 |
| Liberal | Stephen Sprigg | 3,352 | 35.3 | +3.5 |
| Independent | Darrall Renton | 1,005 | 10.6 | +10.6 |
| Total formal votes | | 9,494 | 95.4 | +3.2 |
| Informal votes | | 457 | 4.6 | −3.2 |
| Turnout | | 9,951 | 86.8 | +6.2 |
Two-party-preferred result
| Labor | Julian Grill | 5,558 | 58.5 | −2.7 |
| Liberal | Stephen Sprigg | 3,936 | 41.5 | +2.7 |
| Labor hold | | Swing | −2.7 | |

=== Floreat ===
1993 Western Australian state election: Floreat
| Party | Candidate | Votes | % | ±% |
|---|---|---|---|---|
| Independent | Liz Constable | 11,298 | 57.9 | +57.9 |
| Liberal | Douglas Jecks | 7,127 | 36.5 | −26.8 |
| Greens | Geoffrey Dodson | 786 | 4.0 | +4.0 |
| Democrats | Noreen O'Connor | 300 | 1.5 | −4.4 |
| Total formal votes | | 19,511 | 98.0 | +2.0 |
| Informal votes | | 399 | 2.0 | −2.0 |
| Turnout | | 19,910 | 95.1 | +3.5 |
Two-candidate-preferred result
| Independent | Liz Constable | 12,251 | 62.8 | +62.8 |
| Liberal | Douglas Jecks | 7,260 | 37.2 | −33.1 |
| Independent hold | | Swing | +62.8 | |

=== Fremantle ===
1993 Western Australian state election: Fremantle
| Party | Candidate | Votes | % | ±% |
|---|---|---|---|---|
| Labor | Jim McGinty | 8,828 | 45.9 | +3.3 |
| Liberal | Phillip Storey | 6,930 | 36.0 | +5.7 |
| Greens | Katherine Anketell | 1,597 | 8.3 | +8.3 |
| Democrats | Kevin Allen | 479 | 2.5 | −2.6 |
| | Donald De San Miguel | 383 | 2.0 | +2.0 |
| Independent | Anthony Seman | 261 | 1.4 | +1.4 |
| Independent | Clarrie Isaacs | 247 | 1.3 | +1.3 |
| Independent | Patrick Mullins | 207 | 1.1 | +1.1 |
| Independent | Fred Rieben | 162 | 0.8 | +0.8 |
| Democratic Socialist | Geoffrey Spencer | 145 | 0.8 | +0.8 |
| Total formal votes | | 19,239 | 91.9 | +2.3 |
| Informal votes | | 1,698 | 8.1 | −2.3 |
| Turnout | | 20,937 | 92.7 | +2.9 |
Two-party-preferred result
| Labor | Jim McGinty | 10,850 | 56.4 | −6.0 |
| Liberal | Phillip Storey | 8,389 | 43.6 | +6.0 |
| Labor hold | | Swing | −6.0 | |

=== Geraldton ===
1993 Western Australian state election: Geraldton
| Party | Candidate | Votes | % | ±% |
|---|---|---|---|---|
| Liberal | Bob Bloffwitch | 4,293 | 40.3 | −3.2 |
| Labor | Gary Evershed | 3,593 | 33.8 | −13.8 |
| National | Malcolm Short | 2,402 | 22.6 | +22.6 |
| Independent | William Tomson | 359 | 3.4 | +3.4 |
| Total formal votes | | 10,647 | 96.5 | +2.5 |
| Informal votes | | 381 | 3.5 | −2.5 |
| Turnout | | 11,028 | 94.2 | +3.4 |
Two-party-preferred result
| Liberal | Bob Bloffwitch | 6,350 | 59.6 | +9.8 |
| Labor | Gary Evershed | 4,297 | 40.4 | −9.8 |
| Liberal gain from Labor | | Swing | +9.8 | |

=== Glendalough ===
1993 Western Australian state election: Glendalough
| Party | Candidate | Votes | % | ±% |
|---|---|---|---|---|
| Labor | Carmen Lawrence | 8,567 | 45.4 | −4.2 |
| Liberal | Michael Saunders | 7,635 | 40.5 | +0.6 |
| Greens | Stewart Jackson | 790 | 4.2 | +4.2 |
| Independent | Karen Zielinski | 775 | 4.1 | +4.1 |
| Democrats | Helen Hodgson | 449 | 2.4 | +2.4 |
| Independent | Barbara Campbell | 444 | 2.4 | +2.4 |
| Independent | Scott Calnan | 194 | 1.0 | +1.0 |
| Total formal votes | | 18,854 | 94.9 | +4.8 |
| Informal votes | | 1,021 | 5.1 | −4.8 |
| Turnout | | 19,875 | 93.0 | +4.3 |
Two-party-preferred result
| Labor | Carmen Lawrence | 9,932 | 52.7 | −2.1 |
| Liberal | Michael Saunders | 8,922 | 47.3 | +2.1 |
| Labor hold | | Swing | −2.1 | |

=== Greenough ===
1993 Western Australian state election: Greenough
| Party | Candidate | Votes | % | ±% |
|---|---|---|---|---|
| Liberal | Kevin Minson | 6,805 | 57.8 | +3.4 |
| Labor | John Beenham | 2,833 | 24.1 | −2.0 |
| National | Glenys McDonald | 2,126 | 18.1 | −1.5 |
| Total formal votes | | 11,764 | 96.5 | +2.0 |
| Informal votes | | 421 | 3.5 | −2.0 |
| Turnout | | 12,185 | 94.5 | +2.9 |
Two-party-preferred result
| Liberal | Kevin Minson | 8,582 | 72.9 | +1.6 |
| Labor | John Beenham | 3,182 | 27.1 | −1.6 |
| Liberal hold | | Swing | +1.6 | |

=== Helena ===
1993 Western Australian state election: Helena
| Party | Candidate | Votes | % | ±% |
|---|---|---|---|---|
| Liberal | Rhonda Parker | 8,712 | 44.5 | +3.5 |
| Labor | Gordon Hill | 8,480 | 43.4 | −5.7 |
| Greens | Christine Heal | 1,260 | 6.4 | +6.4 |
| | Owen McGrath | 1,110 | 5.7 | +5.7 |
| Total formal votes | | 19,562 | 95.8 | +4.2 |
| Informal votes | | 846 | 4.2 | −4.2 |
| Turnout | | 20,408 | 94.5 | +2.3 |
Two-party-preferred result
| Labor | Gordon Hill | 9,820 | 50.2 | −2.4 |
| Liberal | Rhonda Parker | 9,742 | 49.8 | +2.4 |
| Labor hold | | Swing | −2.4 | |

=== Jandakot ===
1993 Western Australian state election: Jandakot
| Party | Candidate | Votes | % | ±% |
|---|---|---|---|---|
| Liberal | Mike Board | 12,919 | 62.5 | +3.0 |
| Labor | Dermot Buckley | 6,262 | 30.3 | −1.9 |
| Democrats | David Banner | 1,487 | 7.2 | +7.2 |
| Total formal votes | | 20,668 | 97.2 | +3.0 |
| Informal votes | | 599 | 2.8 | −3.0 |
| Turnout | | 21,267 | 95.3 | +2.1 |
Two-party-preferred result
| Liberal | Mike Board | 13,619 | 65.9 | +1.3 |
| Labor | Dermot Buckley | 7,049 | 34.1 | −1.3 |
| Liberal hold | | Swing | +1.3 | |

=== Kalgoorlie ===
1993 Western Australian state election: Kalgoorlie
| Party | Candidate | Votes | % | ±% |
|---|---|---|---|---|
| Labor | Ian Taylor | 5,054 | 52.7 | −6.5 |
| Liberal | Gary Boyle | 3,328 | 34.7 | +1.6 |
| Independent | Margaret Jones | 1,209 | 12.6 | +12.6 |
| Total formal votes | | 9,591 | 96.3 | +2.4 |
| Informal votes | | 365 | 3.7 | −2.4 |
| Turnout | | 9,956 | 93.1 | +3.8 |
Two-party-preferred result
| Labor | Ian Taylor | 5,532 | 57.7 | −3.7 |
| Liberal | Gary Boyle | 4,059 | 42.3 | +3.7 |
| Labor hold | | Swing | −3.7 | |

=== Kenwick ===
1993 Western Australian state election: Kenwick
| Party | Candidate | Votes | % | ±% |
|---|---|---|---|---|
| Labor | Judyth Watson | 8,847 | 47.5 | −2.0 |
| Liberal | Leslie McMahon | 7,616 | 40.9 | +6.6 |
| Greens | Jacqueline Robinson | 857 | 4.6 | +4.6 |
| Independent | Paul Augustson | 600 | 3.2 | +3.2 |
| Democrats | Valma Preston | 428 | 2.3 | −3.1 |
| Independent | Jean Jeans | 290 | 1.6 | −0.9 |
| Total formal votes | | 18,638 | 94.8 | +5.9 |
| Informal votes | | 1,024 | 5.2 | −5.9 |
| Turnout | | 19,662 | 93.9 | +2.8 |
Two-party-preferred result
| Labor | Judyth Watson | 10,069 | 54.0 | −2.9 |
| Liberal | Leslie McMahon | 8,569 | 46.0 | +2.9 |
| Labor hold | | Swing | −2.9 | |

=== Kimberley ===
1993 Western Australian state election: Kimberley
| Party | Candidate | Votes | % | ±% |
|---|---|---|---|---|
| Labor | Ernie Bridge | 5,838 | 65.4 | −4.2 |
| Liberal | Dale Vaughan | 3,086 | 34.6 | +4.2 |
| Total formal votes | | 8,924 | 98.3 | +0.1 |
| Informal votes | | 158 | 1.7 | −0.1 |
| Turnout | | 9,082 | 75.8 | +3.2 |
| Labor hold | | Swing | −4.2 | |

=== Kingsley ===
1993 Western Australian state election: Kingsley
| Party | Candidate | Votes | % | ±% |
|---|---|---|---|---|
| Liberal | Cheryl Edwardes | 12,417 | 58.3 | +6.3 |
| Labor | John Elkin | 6,889 | 32.4 | −6.5 |
| Greens | Willem Franssen | 1,104 | 5.2 | +5.2 |
| Democrats | Warren Bishop | 880 | 4.1 | +4.1 |
| Total formal votes | | 21,290 | 96.8 | +3.0 |
| Informal votes | | 696 | 3.2 | −3.0 |
| Turnout | | 21,986 | 95.8 | +2.4 |
Two-party-preferred result
| Liberal | Cheryl Edwardes | 13,364 | 62.8 | +5.2 |
| Labor | John Elkin | 7,926 | 37.2 | −5.2 |
| Liberal hold | | Swing | +5.2 | |

=== Mandurah ===
1993 Western Australian state election: Mandurah
| Party | Candidate | Votes | % | ±% |
|---|---|---|---|---|
| Liberal | Roger Nicholls | 5,844 | 55.2 | +9.5 |
| Labor | David Templeman | 3,718 | 37.3 | −8.8 |
| Greens | Andrea Evans | 357 | 3.6 | +3.6 |
| Independent | Norman Dicks | 146 | 1.5 | +1.5 |
| Independent | Neville Hawtin | 111 | 1.1 | +1.1 |
| Independent | Julia Shewring | 78 | 0.8 | +0.8 |
| Independent | Clive Hart | 65 | 0.7 | +0.7 |
| Total formal votes | | 9,979 | 96.1 | +2.5 |
| Informal votes | | 405 | 3.9 | −2.5 |
| Turnout | | 10,384 | 94.0 | +1.7 |
Two-party-preferred result
| Liberal | Roger Nicholls | 5,844 | 58.6 | +7.5 |
| Labor | David Templeman | 4,135 | 41.4 | −7.5 |
| Liberal hold | | Swing | +7.5 | |

=== Marangaroo ===
1993 Western Australian state election: Marangaroo
| Party | Candidate | Votes | % | ±% |
|---|---|---|---|---|
| Labor | Ted Cunningham | 12,966 | 56.1 | −3.2 |
| Liberal | Avis Gobby | 7,486 | 32.4 | −0.2 |
| Independent | Ronald Bowman | 1,276 | 5.5 | +5.5 |
| Greens | Otto Dik | 772 | 3.3 | +3.3 |
| Independent | William Francis | 599 | 2.6 | +2.6 |
| Total formal votes | | 23,099 | 95.1 | +6.2 |
| Informal votes | | 1,179 | 4.9 | −6.2 |
| Turnout | | 24,278 | 94.0 | −2.2 |
Two-party-preferred result
| Labor | Ted Cunningham | 14,396 | 62.3 | −0.1 |
| Liberal | Avis Gobby | 8,703 | 37.7 | +0.1 |
| Labor hold | | Swing | −0.1 | |

=== Marmion ===
1993 Western Australian state election: Marmion
| Party | Candidate | Votes | % | ±% |
|---|---|---|---|---|
| Liberal | Jim Clarko | 14,805 | 64.9 | +8.2 |
| Labor | Kirk Stergiou | 5,284 | 23.2 | −6.9 |
| Greens | Vivienne Elanta | 1,483 | 6.5 | +0.5 |
| Democrats | Elizabeth Brown | 1,221 | 5.4 | +5.4 |
| Total formal votes | | 22,793 | 97.4 | +3.0 |
| Informal votes | | 597 | 2.6 | −3.0 |
| Turnout | | 23,390 | 94.8 | +2.5 |
Two-party-preferred result
| Liberal | Jim Clarko | 16,054 | 70.4 | +6.1 |
| Labor | Kirk Stergiou | 5,284 | 23.2 | −6.1 |
| Liberal hold | | Swing | +6.1 | |

=== Maylands ===
1993 Western Australian state election: Maylands
| Party | Candidate | Votes | % | ±% |
|---|---|---|---|---|
| Labor | Judy Edwards | 9,605 | 50.0 | −6.1 |
| Liberal | Gary Lilleyman | 7,097 | 36.9 | +3.7 |
| Greens | Robert Paton | 1,230 | 6.4 | +6.4 |
| Democrats | Rosslyn Tilbury | 708 | 3.7 | +3.7 |
| Independent | Noel Sharp | 575 | 3.0 | +2.0 |
| Total formal votes | | 19,215 | 95.3 | +4.5 |
| Informal votes | | 957 | 4.7 | −4.5 |
| Turnout | | 20,172 | 93.1 | +2.5 |
Two-party-preferred result
| Labor | Judy Edwards | 11,061 | 57.6 | −2.5 |
| Liberal | Gary Lilleyman | 8,154 | 42.4 | +2.5 |
| Labor hold | | Swing | −2.5 | |

=== Melville ===
1993 Western Australian state election: Melville
| Party | Candidate | Votes | % | ±% |
|---|---|---|---|---|
| Liberal | Doug Shave | 10,433 | 53.6 | +9.3 |
| Labor | William Lyon | 6,338 | 32.5 | −11.8 |
| Greens | Valerie Cousins | 668 | 3.4 | −1.3 |
| Independent | Margaret Barton | 608 | 3.1 | +3.1 |
| Independent | Shirley de la Hunty | 555 | 2.9 | +2.9 |
| Independent | Anthony Buhagiar | 457 | 2.4 | +2.4 |
| Democrats | Ann Curtis | 235 | 1.2 | +1.2 |
| Independent | Michael McKibbin | 184 | 0.9 | +0.9 |
| Total formal votes | | 19,478 | 95.5 | +3.5 |
| Informal votes | | 921 | 4.5 | −3.5 |
| Turnout | | 20,399 | 94.6 | +2.1 |
Two-party-preferred result
| Liberal | Doug Shave | 11,746 | 60.3 | +10.2 |
| Labor | William Lyon | 7,732 | 39.7 | −10.2 |
| Liberal hold | | Swing | +10.2 | |

=== Merredin ===
1993 Western Australian state election: Merredin
| Party | Candidate | Votes | % | ±% |
|---|---|---|---|---|
| National | Hendy Cowan | 5,576 | 53.8 | −24.1 |
| Liberal | Jos Chatfield | 3,220 | 31.1 | +31.1 |
| Labor | Susanne Chance | 1,569 | 15.1 | −2.9 |
| Total formal votes | | 10,365 | 97.3 | +1.7 |
| Informal votes | | 289 | 2.7 | +1.7 |
| Turnout | | 10,654 | 95.1 | +2.3 |
Two-candidate-preferred result
| National | Hendy Cowan | 6,796 | 65.6 | −15.6 |
| Liberal | Jos Chatfield | 3,569 | 34.4 | +34.4 |
| National hold | | Swing | −15.6 | |

=== Mitchell ===
1993 Western Australian state election: Mitchell
| Party | Candidate | Votes | % | ±% |
|---|---|---|---|---|
| Labor | David Smith | 5,245 | 46.1 | −11.3 |
| Liberal | Kerrol Gildersleeve | 4,454 | 39.2 | −3.4 |
| Greens | Jill Reading | 557 | 4.9 | +4.9 |
| Independent | John Sibson | 513 | 4.5 | +4.5 |
| Independent | Ronald Cook | 468 | 4.1 | +4.1 |
| Democrats | Bernard Noonan | 133 | 1.2 | +1.2 |
| Total formal votes | | 11,370 | 96.6 | −1.3 |
| Informal votes | | 405 | 3.4 | +1.3 |
| Turnout | | 11,775 | 95.0 | +2.9 |
Two-party-preferred result
| Labor | David Smith | 6,012 | 52.9 | −4.5 |
| Liberal | Kerrol Gildersleeve | 5,358 | 47.1 | +4.5 |
| Labor hold | | Swing | −4.5 | |

=== Moore ===
1993 Western Australian state election: Moore
| Party | Candidate | Votes | % | ±% |
|---|---|---|---|---|
| Liberal | Bill McNee | 6,069 | 53.0 | +4.2 |
| National | Dexter Davies | 3,294 | 28.8 | −1.2 |
| Labor | Colin Meredith | 2,082 | 18.2 | +0.5 |
| Total formal votes | | 11,445 | 97.0 | +1.4 |
| Informal votes | | 355 | 3.0 | −1.4 |
| Turnout | | 11,800 | 94.2 | +2.0 |
Two-candidate-preferred result
| Liberal | Bill McNee | 6,387 | 55.8 | +3.3 |
| National | Dexter Davies | 5,058 | 44.2 | −3.3 |
| Liberal hold | | Swing | +3.3 | |

=== Morley ===
1993 Western Australian state election: Morley
| Party | Candidate | Votes | % | ±% |
|---|---|---|---|---|
| Labor | Clive Brown | 10,275 | 49.7 | −12.7 |
| Liberal | John Horobin | 6,971 | 33.7 | −3.9 |
| Independent | Karry-Lea Smith | 3,421 | 16.6 | +16.6 |
| Total formal votes | | 20,667 | 94.9 | −1.6 |
| Informal votes | | 1,116 | 5.1 | +1.6 |
| Turnout | | 21,783 | 94.4 | +2.0 |
Two-party-preferred result
| Labor | Clive Brown | 11,913 | 57.6 | −4.8 |
| Liberal | John Horobin | 8,754 | 42.4 | +4.8 |
| Labor hold | | Swing | −4.8 | |

=== Murray ===
1993 Western Australian state election: Murray
| Party | Candidate | Votes | % | ±% |
|---|---|---|---|---|
| Liberal | Arthur Marshall | 6,330 | 44.8 | −0.4 |
| Labor | Keith Read | 6,160 | 43.6 | −0.6 |
| National | Frank Letchford | 586 | 4.2 | +4.2 |
| Independent | Kim Blacklock | 361 | 2.6 | +2.6 |
| Democrats | Susan Ishmael | 213 | 1.5 | +1.5 |
| Independent | Wayne Whitcroft | 206 | 1.5 | +1.5 |
| Independent | Laurence Preston | 173 | 1.2 | +1.2 |
| Independent | Theo Kearing | 87 | 0.6 | +0.6 |
| Total formal votes | | 14,116 | 95.8 | +3.3 |
| Informal votes | | 612 | 4.2 | −3.3 |
| Turnout | | 14,728 | 94.1 | +2.0 |
Two-party-preferred result
| Liberal | Arthur Marshall | 7,242 | 51.3 | +2.2 |
| Labor | Keith Read | 6,874 | 48.7 | −2.2 |
| Liberal gain from Labor | | Swing | +2.2 | |

=== Nedlands ===
1993 Western Australian state election: Nedlands
| Party | Candidate | Votes | % | ±% |
|---|---|---|---|---|
| Liberal | Richard Court | 11,831 | 64.3 | +4.7 |
| Labor | William Harman | 3,641 | 19.8 | −5.2 |
| Greens | Elisabeth Jones | 2,006 | 10.9 | +10.9 |
| Democrats | Fraser Pope | 910 | 5.0 | −3.9 |
| Total formal votes | | 18,388 | 97.1 | +1.8 |
| Informal votes | | 555 | 2.9 | −1.8 |
| Turnout | | 18,943 | 91.8 | +4.6 |
Two-party-preferred result
| Liberal | Richard Court | 12,995 | 70.7 | +3.4 |
| Labor | William Harman | 5,393 | 29.3 | −3.4 |
| Liberal hold | | Swing | +3.4 | |

=== Nollamara ===
1993 Western Australian state election: Nollamara
| Party | Candidate | Votes | % | ±% |
|---|---|---|---|---|
| Labor | John Kobelke | 9,168 | 49.2 | −0.9 |
| Liberal | John Babbage | 7,363 | 39.5 | −4.7 |
| Independent | Neil Watson | 1,418 | 7.6 | +7.6 |
| Greens | Lucy Honan | 697 | 3.7 | +3.7 |
| Total formal votes | | 18,646 | 95.3 | +6.5 |
| Informal votes | | 915 | 4.7 | −6.5 |
| Turnout | | 19,561 | 93.9 | +2.1 |
Two-party-preferred result
| Labor | John Kobelke | 10,204 | 54.7 | +1.0 |
| Liberal | John Babbage | 8,442 | 45.3 | −1.0 |
| Labor hold | | Swing | +1.0 | |

=== Northern Rivers ===
1993 Western Australian state election: Northern Rivers
| Party | Candidate | Votes | % | ±% |
|---|---|---|---|---|
| Labor | Kevin Leahy | 4,307 | 46.1 | −4.5 |
| Liberal | Dudley Maslen | 3,657 | 39.2 | −10.2 |
| National | Paquita Boston | 677 | 7.2 | +7.2 |
| Greens | Lorraine Hatchwell | 424 | 4.5 | +4.5 |
| Democrats | Jill Bond | 159 | 1.7 | +1.7 |
| Independent | Nabil Rowland | 115 | 1.2 | +1.2 |
| Total formal votes | | 9,339 | 96.2 | −1.6 |
| Informal votes | | 372 | 3.8 | +1.6 |
| Turnout | | 9,711 | 89.0 | +5.8 |
Two-party-preferred result
| Labor | Kevin Leahy | 4,835 | 51.8 | +1.2 |
| Liberal | Dudley Maslen | 4,504 | 48.2 | −1.2 |
| Labor hold | | Swing | +1.2 | |

=== Peel ===
1993 Western Australian state election: Peel
| Party | Candidate | Votes | % | ±% |
|---|---|---|---|---|
| Labor | Norm Marlborough | 12,412 | 54.4 | +1.8 |
| Liberal | Margaret McMurdo | 7,690 | 33.7 | +4.0 |
| Greens | Jeff Anderton | 1,956 | 8.6 | +8.6 |
| Democrats | Huw Grossmith | 747 | 3.3 | +3.3 |
| Total formal votes | | 22,805 | 95.5 | +5.7 |
| Informal votes | | 1,065 | 4.5 | −5.7 |
| Turnout | | 23,870 | 93.4 | +2.1 |
Two-party-preferred result
| Labor | Norm Marlborough | 13,837 | 60.7 | +1.3 |
| Liberal | Margaret McMurdo | 8,968 | 39.3 | −1.3 |
| Labor hold | | Swing | +1.3 | |

=== Perth ===
1993 Western Australian state election: Perth
| Party | Candidate | Votes | % | ±% |
|---|---|---|---|---|
| Liberal | Hal Colebatch | 7,741 | 42.4 | −0.7 |
| Labor | Diana Warnock | 7,167 | 39.3 | −6.6 |
| Independent | Kathleen Mallott | 1,351 | 7.4 | +7.4 |
| Greens | Penelope Robinson | 1,319 | 7.2 | +7.2 |
| Democratic Socialist | Michelle Hovane | 276 | 1.5 | +1.5 |
| Independent | Christopher Bignell | 145 | 0.8 | +0.8 |
| Independent | Life Addvalue | 137 | 0.8 | +0.8 |
| | Alexander Manfrin | 122 | 0.7 | +0.7 |
| Total formal votes | | 18,258 | 7.1 | +1.3 |
| Informal votes | | 1,398 | 7.1 | −1.3 |
| Turnout | | 19,656 | 91.2 | +2.7 |
Two-party-preferred result
| Labor | Diana Warnock | 9,182 | 50.3 | −0.9 |
| Liberal | Hal Colebatch | 9,076 | 49.7 | +0.9 |
| Labor hold | | Swing | −0.9 | |

=== Pilbara ===
1993 Western Australian state election: Pilbara
| Party | Candidate | Votes | % | ±% |
|---|---|---|---|---|
| Labor | Larry Graham | 4,840 | 56.2 | −0.3 |
| Liberal | Pamela Walsh | 2,051 | 23.8 | −7.0 |
| Independent | Allan Hutcheson | 598 | 6.9 | +6.9 |
| Independent | Karen Merrin | 528 | 6.1 | +6.1 |
| Greens | David Flynn | 311 | 3.6 | +3.6 |
| Democrats | Glenis Cooper | 219 | 2.5 | +2.5 |
| Independent | Rodney Tregonning | 72 | 0.8 | +0.8 |
| Total formal votes | | 8,619 | 95.2 | +4.3 |
| Informal votes | | 438 | 4.8 | −4.3 |
| Turnout | | 9,057 | 82.9 | +4.5 |
Two-party-preferred result
| Labor | Larry Graham | 5,769 | 66.9 | +5.4 |
| Liberal | Pamela Walsh | 2,850 | 33.1 | −5.4 |
| Labor hold | | Swing | +5.4 | |

=== Riverton ===
1993 Western Australian state election: Riverton
| Party | Candidate | Votes | % | ±% |
|---|---|---|---|---|
| Liberal | Graham Kierath | 10,442 | 56.0 | +7.5 |
| Labor | Dean Ellis | 6,342 | 34.0 | −4.5 |
| Greens | Sally Boteler | 1,212 | 6.5 | +6.5 |
| Democrats | Donald Bryant | 661 | 3.5 | −0.9 |
| Total formal votes | | 18,657 | 96.6 | +3.5 |
| Informal votes | | 661 | 3.4 | −3.5 |
| Turnout | | 19,318 | 94.2 | +2.0 |
Two-party-preferred result
| Liberal | Graham Kierath | 11,284 | 60.5 | +6.0 |
| Labor | Dean Ellis | 7,373 | 39.5 | −6.0 |
| Liberal hold | | Swing | +6.0 | |

=== Rockingham ===
1993 Western Australian state election: Rockingham
| Party | Candidate | Votes | % | ±% |
|---|---|---|---|---|
| Labor | Mike Barnett | 9,391 | 46.4 | −3.8 |
| Liberal | Kathleen Harste | 5,135 | 25.4 | −11.6 |
| Independent | Laurie Smith | 3,822 | 18.9 | +18.9 |
| Greens | Barbara Gilchrist | 717 | 3.5 | +3.5 |
| Independent | Allan Hill | 508 | 2.5 | +2.5 |
| Democrats | John Anderson | 397 | 2.0 | +2.0 |
| Independent | Arthur Galletly | 260 | 1.3 | +1.3 |
| Total formal votes | | 20,230 | 95.3 | +3.8 |
| Informal votes | | 995 | 4.7 | −3.8 |
| Turnout | | 21,225 | 94.2 | +1.7 |
Two-party-preferred result
| Labor | Mike Barnett | 11,217 | 55.5 | +1.4 |
| Liberal | Kathleen Harste | 9,013 | 44.5 | −1.4 |
| Labor hold | | Swing | +1.4 | |

=== Roe ===
1993 Western Australian state election: Roe
| Party | Candidate | Votes | % | ±% |
|---|---|---|---|---|
| National | Ross Ainsworth | 6,033 | 53.6 | +19.6 |
| Liberal | Allan Matthews | 3,104 | 27.6 | −14.7 |
| Labor | Rosemary Braybrook | 1,804 | 16.0 | −2.7 |
| Independent | Roderick Rogers | 312 | 2.8 | +2.8 |
| Total formal votes | | 11,253 | 96.6 | +1.1 |
| Informal votes | | 393 | 3.4 | −1.1 |
| Turnout | | 11,646 | 94.1 | +2.5 |
Two-candidate-preferred result
| National | Ross Ainsworth | 7,721 | 68.6 | +17.6 |
| Liberal | Allan Matthews | 3,532 | 31.4 | −17.6 |
| National hold | | Swing | +17.6 | |

=== Roleystone ===
1993 Western Australian state election: Roleystone
| Party | Candidate | Votes | % | ±% |
|---|---|---|---|---|
| Liberal | Fred Tubby | 9,265 | 48.8 | +4.7 |
| Labor | Michael Duxbury | 7,615 | 40.1 | −2.3 |
| Independent | Michael Devereux | 782 | 4.1 | +4.1 |
| Independent | Karen Nielsen | 747 | 3.9 | +3.9 |
| Democrats | Raymond Tilbury | 586 | 3.1 | +3.1 |
| Total formal votes | | 18,995 | 96.2 | +4.0 |
| Informal votes | | 753 | 3.8 | −4.0 |
| Turnout | | 19,748 | 93.8 | +1.7 |
Two-party-preferred result
| Liberal | Fred Tubby | 10,252 | 54.0 | +2.3 |
| Labor | Michael Duxbury | 8,743 | 46.0 | −2.3 |
| Liberal hold | | Swing | +2.3 | |

=== Scarborough ===
1993 Western Australian state election: Scarborough
| Party | Candidate | Votes | % | ±% |
|---|---|---|---|---|
| Liberal | George Strickland | 9,670 | 51.1 | +6.5 |
| Labor | Robyn Murphy | 6,842 | 36.2 | −5.7 |
| Greens | Robert Tait | 1,187 | 6.3 | +6.3 |
| Independent | Dean Economou | 711 | 3.8 | +3.8 |
| Democrats | Gaenor Cranch | 496 | 2.6 | −2.2 |
| Total formal votes | | 18,906 | 96.7 | +2.2 |
| Informal votes | | 637 | 3.3 | −2.2 |
| Turnout | | 19,543 | 93.6 | +3.3 |
Two-party-preferred result
| Liberal | George Strickland | 10,627 | 56.2 | +4.6 |
| Labor | Robyn Murphy | 8,279 | 43.8 | −4.6 |
| Liberal hold | | Swing | +4.6 | |

=== South Perth ===
1993 Western Australian state election: South Perth
| Party | Candidate | Votes | % | ±% |
|---|---|---|---|---|
| Liberal | Phillip Pendal | 10,734 | 58.7 | +8.0 |
| Independent | Jim Grayden | 4,711 | 25.8 | +25.8 |
| Greens | Troy Ellis | 1,587 | 8.7 | +8.7 |
| Democrats | Gordon Edwards | 626 | 3.4 | +3.4 |
| Independent | Isobel | 333 | 1.8 | +1.8 |
| Independent | Brett Miller | 301 | 1.7 | +1.7 |
| Total formal votes | | 18,292 | 95.8 | +1.5 |
| Informal votes | | 801 | 4.2 | −1.5 |
| Turnout | | 19,093 | 91.9 | +3.4 |
Two-candidate-preferred result
| Liberal | Phillip Pendal | 11,555 | 63.2 | +1.9 |
| Independent | Jim Grayden | 6,737 | 36.8 | +36.8 |
| Liberal hold | | Swing | +1.9 | |

=== Stirling ===
1993 Western Australian state election: Stirling
| Party | Candidate | Votes | % | ±% |
|---|---|---|---|---|
| National | Monty House | 5,896 | 52.2 | +9.8 |
| Liberal | James Barrow | 2,388 | 21.1 | −8.7 |
| Labor | Anthony Hughes | 1,882 | 16.7 | −4.7 |
| Greens | Pamela Rumble | 772 | 6.8 | +6.8 |
| Democrats | Maurice Deane | 206 | 1.8 | +1.8 |
| CALM Resistance Movement | William North | 153 | 1.4 | +1.4 |
| Total formal votes | | 11,297 | 97.2 | +1.8 |
| Informal votes | | 328 | 2.8 | −1.8 |
| Turnout | | 11,625 | 95.1 | +2.7 |
Two-candidate-preferred result
| National | Monty House | 8,505 | 75.3 | +10.2 |
| Liberal | James Barrow | 2,792 | 24.7 | −10.2 |
| National hold | | Swing | +10.2 | |

=== Swan Hills ===
1993 Western Australian state election: Swan Hills
| Party | Candidate | Votes | % | ±% |
|---|---|---|---|---|
| Liberal | June van de Klashorst | 9,062 | 41.6 | −1.1 |
| Labor | Clyde Bevan | 8,084 | 37.2 | −11.3 |
| Greens | Philip Bourgault Du Coudray | 1,392 | 6.4 | +6.4 |
| National | James Lee | 1,079 | 5.0 | +5.0 |
| Democrats | Kingsley Dunstan | 891 | 4.1 | +4.1 |
| Independent | Kevin Oliver | 754 | 3.5 | +3.5 |
| Independent | Diane Parker | 499 | 2.3 | +2.3 |
| Total formal votes | | 21,761 | 95.2 | +2.6 |
| Informal votes | | 1,086 | 4.8 | −2.6 |
| Turnout | | 22,847 | 93.8 | +2.7 |
Two-party-preferred result
| Liberal | June van de Klashorst | 11,888 | 54.6 | +6.1 |
| Labor | Clyde Bevan | 9,873 | 45.4 | −6.1 |
| Liberal gain from Labor | | Swing | +6.1 | |

=== Thornlie ===
1993 Western Australian state election: Thornlie
| Party | Candidate | Votes | % | ±% |
|---|---|---|---|---|
| Labor | Yvonne Henderson | 9,533 | 51.7 | −2.2 |
| Liberal | Monica Holmes | 7,386 | 40.0 | +4.1 |
| Independent | Joseph Isherwood | 938 | 5.1 | +5.1 |
| Democrats | Gordon Stapp | 599 | 3.3 | +3.3 |
| Total formal votes | | 18,456 | 95.8 | +6.1 |
| Informal votes | | 803 | 4.2 | −6.1 |
| Turnout | | 19,259 | 94.7 | +2.6 |
Two-party-preferred result
| Labor | Yvonne Henderson | 10,280 | 55.7 | −1.7 |
| Liberal | Monica Holmes | 8,176 | 44.3 | +1.7 |
| Labor hold | | Swing | −1.7 | |

=== Vasse ===
1993 Western Australian state election: Vasse
| Party | Candidate | Votes | % | ±% |
|---|---|---|---|---|
| Liberal | Barry Blaikie | 6,139 | 58.1 | +1.2 |
| Labor | Leslie Longwood | 2,146 | 20.3 | −7.8 |
| Greens | David Swainston | 1,203 | 11.4 | +11.4 |
| National | Coralie Tarbotton | 1,076 | 10.2 | −4.9 |
| Total formal votes | | 10,564 | 96.8 | +1.8 |
| Informal votes | | 345 | 3.2 | −1.8 |
| Turnout | | 10,909 | 94.7 | +1.1 |
Two-party-preferred result
| Liberal | Barry Blaikie | 7,524 | 71.2 | +2.5 |
| Labor | Leslie Longwood | 3,040 | 28.8 | −2.5 |
| Liberal hold | | Swing | +2.5 | |

=== Victoria Park ===
1993 Western Australian state election: Victoria Park
| Party | Candidate | Votes | % | ±% |
|---|---|---|---|---|
| Labor | Geoff Gallop | 8,927 | 46.7 | −2.3 |
| Liberal | Betsy Kennish | 7,649 | 40.0 | +3.3 |
| Greens | Andrew Thomson | 1,209 | 6.3 | +6.3 |
| Independent | Ian Tracy | 787 | 4.1 | +4.1 |
| Democrats | Daniel Bagster | 560 | 2.9 | −2.7 |
| Total formal votes | | 19,132 | 95.3 | +3.8 |
| Informal votes | | 953 | 4.7 | −3.8 |
| Turnout | | 20,085 | 91.8 | +2.8 |
Two-party-preferred result
| Labor | Geoff Gallop | 10,513 | 55.0 | −2.4 |
| Liberal | Betsy Kennish | 8,619 | 45.0 | +2.4 |
| Labor hold | | Swing | −2.4 | |

=== Wagin ===
1993 Western Australian state election: Wagin
| Party | Candidate | Votes | % | ±% |
|---|---|---|---|---|
| National | Bob Wiese | 8,251 | 77.7 | +26.4 |
| Liberal | Kelly Newton-Wordsworth | 2,361 | 22.3 | −7.0 |
| Total formal votes | | 10,612 | 95.8 | +1.8 |
| Informal votes | | 461 | 4.2 | −1.8 |
| Turnout | | 11,073 | 94.3 | +1.3 |
| National hold | | Swing | +9.6 | |

=== Wanneroo ===
1993 Western Australian state election: Wanneroo
| Party | Candidate | Votes | % | ±% |
|---|---|---|---|---|
| Liberal | Wayde Smith | 10,529 | 43.6 | +3.4 |
| Labor | Jackie Watkins | 9,968 | 41.3 | −5.8 |
| Greens | Stephen Magyar | 1,146 | 4.7 | +4.7 |
| Independent | Terry Bolden | 578 | 2.4 | +2.4 |
| Independent | William Duffy | 558 | 2.3 | +2.3 |
| Independent | Ronald Palmer | 447 | 1.9 | +1.9 |
| Democrats | Bronwyn Jones | 406 | 1.7 | +1.7 |
| Call to Australia | Ronald Holt | 391 | 1.6 | +1.6 |
| Independent | Michael O'Brien | 138 | 0.6 | +0.6 |
| Total formal votes | | 24,161 | 95.8 | +3.8 |
| Informal votes | | 1,068 | 4.2 | −3.8 |
| Turnout | | 25,229 | 94.9 | +2.7 |
Two-party-preferred result
| Liberal | Wayde Smith | 12,397 | 51.3 | +2.9 |
| Labor | Jackie Watkins | 11,764 | 48.7 | −2.9 |
| Liberal gain from Labor | | Swing | +2.9 | |

=== Warren ===
1993 Western Australian state election: Warren
| Party | Candidate | Votes | % | ±% |
|---|---|---|---|---|
| Liberal | Paul Omodei | 6,833 | 65.3 | +12.1 |
| Labor | Keith Lillie | 2,363 | 22.6 | −14.6 |
| Greens | Peter Akerman | 1,263 | 12.1 | +12.1 |
| Total formal votes | | 10,459 | 96.7 | +1.7 |
| Informal votes | | 360 | 3.3 | −1.7 |
| Turnout | | 10,819 | 95.4 | +1.8 |
Two-party-preferred result
| Liberal | Paul Omodei | 7,310 | 69.9 | +9.1 |
| Labor | Keith Lillie | 3,149 | 30.1 | −9.1 |
| Liberal hold | | Swing | +9.1 | |

=== Wellington ===
1993 Western Australian state election: Wellington
| Party | Candidate | Votes | % | ±% |
|---|---|---|---|---|
| Liberal | John Bradshaw | 6,503 | 62.4 | −0.7 |
| Labor | Marilyn Elson | 2,892 | 27.8 | −2.7 |
| Greens | Judyth Salom | 651 | 6.3 | +6.3 |
| Democrats | Bernard Noonan | 371 | 3.6 | +3.6 |
| Total formal votes | | 10,417 | 96.1 | +2.8 |
| Informal votes | | 421 | 3.9 | −2.8 |
| Turnout | | 10,838 | 94.9 | +1.9 |
Two-party-preferred result
| Liberal | John Bradshaw | 6,997 | 67.2 | −0.3 |
| Labor | Marilyn Elson | 3,420 | 32.8 | +0.3 |
| Liberal hold | | Swing | −0.3 | |

=== Whitford ===
1993 Western Australian state election: Whitford
| Party | Candidate | Votes | % | ±% |
|---|---|---|---|---|
| Liberal | Rob Johnson | 8,913 | 46.4 | +11.3 |
| Labor | Pam Beggs | 7,045 | 36.7 | −7.0 |
| Independent | Jannifer Pearce | 884 | 4.6 | +4.6 |
| Greens | Miguel Castillo | 825 | 4.3 | +4.3 |
| Democrats | Geoffrey Curtis | 798 | 4.2 | +4.2 |
| Independent | Norma Rundle | 731 | 3.8 | +3.8 |
| Total formal votes | | 19,196 | 96.9 | +3.1 |
| Informal votes | | 615 | 3.1 | −3.1 |
| Turnout | | 19,811 | 94.9 | +2.8 |
Two-party-preferred result
| Liberal | Rob Johnson | 10,768 | 56.1 | +7.8 |
| Labor | Pam Beggs | 8,428 | 43.9 | −7.8 |
| Liberal gain from Labor | | Swing | +7.8 | |

== See also ==
- Results of the Western Australian state election, 1993 (Legislative Council)
- 1993 Western Australian state election
- Candidates of the Western Australian state election, 1993
- Members of the Western Australian Legislative Assembly, 1993–1996
