= Electoral results for the district of Mandurah =

Western Australian district election results

This is a list of electoral results for the electoral district of Mandurah in Western Australian state elections.

== Members for Mandurah ==
Member	Party	Term
John Read	Labor	1983–1989
Roger Nicholls	Liberal	1989–2001
David Templeman	Labor	2001–2025
Rhys Williams	Labor	2025–present

== Election results ==
=== Elections in the 2020s ===
2025 Western Australian state election: Mandurah
Party	Candidate	Votes	%	±%
Labor	Rhys Williams	11,930	46.9	−20.7
Liberal	Kaye Seeber	7,508	29.5	+8.7
One Nation	Nicholas Gemmell	2,249	8.8	+7.2
Greens	Chance Riley Bruening	2,186	8.6	+5.5
Stop Pedophiles	C. Hill	1,025	4.0	+4.0
Christians	Lenka Pesch	552	2.2	+2.2
Total formal votes		25,450	94.7	−0.2
Informal votes		1,413	5.3	+0.2
Turnout		26,863	81.9	+7.3
Two-party-preferred result
Labor	Rhys Williams	15,144	59.5	−14.7
Liberal	Kaye Seeber	10,294	40.5	+14.7
Labor hold		Swing	−14.7	

Results are not final. Last updated on 31 March 2025 at 6:30 PM AWST

2021 Western Australian state election: Mandurah
Party	Candidate	Votes	%	±%
Labor	David Templeman	16,776	68.7	+12.0
Liberal	Ryan Burns	4,875	20.0	−1.7
Greens	Xanthe Turner	726	3.0	−1.8
Shooters, Fishers, Farmers	Ian Blevin	531	2.2	+2.1
Legalise Cannabis	Rodney Beaton	412	1.7	+1.7
One Nation	Haydn Regterschot	388	1.6	−11.2
No Mandatory Vaccination	Samy Spinola	214	0.9	+0.9
Independent	Gavin Farbey	177	0.7	+0.7
National	Cons Ortheil	144	0.6	−1.4
Sustainable Australia	Katherine Summers	117	0.5	+0.5
WAxit	Marius Timis	60	0.2	−0.4
Total formal votes		24,420	94.6	−0.2
Informal votes		1,386	5.4	+0.2
Turnout		25,806	82.1	−2.1
Two-party-preferred result
Labor	David Templeman	18,368	75.2	+7.3
Liberal	Ryan Burns	6,049	24.8	−7.3
Labor hold		Swing	+7.3	

=== Elections in the 2010s ===
2017 Western Australian state election: Mandurah
Party	Candidate	Votes	%	±%
Labor	David Templeman	13,273	57.0	+4.5
Liberal	Lynne Rowlands	5,015	21.5	−16.1
One Nation	Doug Shaw	3,008	12.9	+12.9
Greens	Jodie Moffat	1,072	4.6	+1.0
National	Jason Turner	487	2.1	+0.3
Flux the System!	Seb Carrie-Wilson	285	1.2	+1.2
Micro Business	Paul Batsioudis	155	0.7	+0.7
Total formal votes		23,295	94.9	−0.6
Informal votes		1,262	5.1	+0.6
Turnout		24,557	84.7	+1.8
Two-party-preferred result
Labor	David Templeman	15,836	68.0	+10.3
Liberal	Lynne Rowlands	7,451	32.0	−10.3
Labor hold		Swing	+10.3	

2013 Western Australian state election: Mandurah
Party	Candidate	Votes	%	±%
Labor	David Templeman	10,507	52.5	–0.4
Liberal	Tony Solin	7,531	37.6	+3.5
Greens	Chilla Bulbeck	724	3.6	–2.5
Family First	Andrew Newhouse	527	2.6	–1.2
National	Jake Ash	367	1.8	+1.8
Independent	John Hughes	261	1.3	+1.3
Independent	Charles Bryant	102	0.5	+0.5
Total formal votes		20,019	95.4	+0.9
Informal votes		957	4.6	−0.9
Turnout		20,976	88.2	
Two-party-preferred result
Labor	David Templeman	11,550	57.7	–2.8
Liberal	Tony Solin	8,465	42.3	+2.8
Labor hold		Swing	–2.8	

=== Elections in the 2000s ===
2008 Western Australian state election: Mandurah
Party	Candidate	Votes	%	±%
Labor	David Templeman	9,188	52.9	+0.0
Liberal	Les Atkins	5,922	34.1	−0.7
Greens	Clare Nunan	1,067	6.1	+2.5
Family First	Rhonda Hamersley	657	3.8	+1.2
Christian Democrats	Michelle Shave	437	2.5	+1.2
Citizens Electoral Council	Keith Hallam	98	0.6	+0.0
Total formal votes		17,369	94.6	+0.1
Informal votes		995	5.4	−0.1
Turnout		18,364	87.0	
Two-party-preferred result
Labor	David Templeman	10,494	60.5	+2.0
Liberal	Les Atkins	6,864	39.5	−2.0
Labor hold		Swing	+2.0	

2005 Western Australian state election: Mandurah
Party	Candidate	Votes	%	±%
Labor	David Templeman	7,217	57.6	+14.3
Liberal	Ashley King	4,110	32.8	+1.1
Greens	Rebecca Brown	380	3.0	−1.9
Family First	Trent Peterson	308	2.5	+2.5
One Nation	Sonja Davalos	218	1.7	−11.9
Christian Democrats	Fiona McKenzie-Brown	190	1.5	+1.5
Citizens Electoral Council	Ian Tuffnell	106	0.8	+0.8
Total formal votes		12,529	94.8	−1.3
Informal votes		683	5.2	+1.3
Turnout		13,212	90.4	
Two-party-preferred result
Labor	David Templeman	7,802	62.3	+4.6
Liberal	Ashley King	4,720	37.7	−4.6
Labor hold		Swing	+4.6	

2001 Western Australian state election: Mandurah
Party	Candidate	Votes	%	±%
Labor	David Templeman	5,077	40.3	+1.0
Liberal	Roger Nicholls	4,394	34.9	−12.6
One Nation	Martin Suter	1,586	12.6	+12.6
Seniors Party	Don Hatch	685	5.4	+5.4
Greens	Beryl Francis	626	5.0	−0.1
Independent	John Smith	216	1.7	−3.8
Total formal votes		12,584	96.8	+0.7
Informal votes		413	3.2	−0.7
Turnout		12,997	92.4	
Two-party-preferred result
Labor	David Templeman	6,856	54.9	+7.9
Liberal	Roger Nicholls	5,629	45.1	−7.9
Labor gain from Liberal		Swing	+7.9	

=== Elections in the 1990s ===
1996 Western Australian state election: Mandurah
Party	Candidate	Votes	%	±%
Liberal	Roger Nicholls	5,281	47.5	−2.9
Labor	Kevin Holmes	4,374	39.3	−2.0
Independent	John Smith	608	5.5	+5.5
Greens	Patricia Keddie	569	5.1	+2.3
Democrats	Marjorie McKercher	284	2.6	+2.3
Total formal votes		11,116	96.2	+0.5
Informal votes		443	3.8	−0.5
Turnout		11,559	91.0	
Two-party-preferred result
Liberal	Roger Nicholls	5,877	53.0	−1.2
Labor	Kevin Holmes	5,215	47.0	+1.2
Liberal hold		Swing	−1.2	

1993 Western Australian state election: Mandurah
Party	Candidate	Votes	%	±%
Liberal	Roger Nicholls	5,504	55.2	+9.5
Labor	David Templeman	3,718	37.3	−8.8
Greens	Andrea Evans	357	3.6	+3.6
Independent	Norman Dicks	146	1.5	+1.5
Independent	Neville Hawtin	111	1.1	+1.1
Independent	Julia Shewring	78	0.8	+0.8
Independent	Clive Hart	65	0.7	+0.7
Total formal votes		9,979	96.1	+2.5
Informal votes		405	3.9	−2.5
Turnout		10,384	94.0	+1.7
Two-party-preferred result
Liberal	Roger Nicholls	5,844	58.6	+7.5
Labor	David Templeman	4,135	41.4	−7.5
Liberal hold		Swing	+7.5	

=== Elections in the 1980s ===
1989 Western Australian state election: Mandurah
Party	Candidate	Votes	%	±%
Labor	John Read	4,012	46.1	−9.7
Liberal	Roger Nicholls	3,974	45.7	+7.0
Grey Power	Barbara Stark	711	8.2	+8.2
Total formal votes		8,697	93.6	
Informal votes		590	6.4	
Turnout		9,287	92.3	
Two-party-preferred result
Liberal	Roger Nicholls	4,441	51.1	+9.7
Labor	John Read	4,256	48.9	−9.7
Liberal gain from Labor		Swing	+9.7	

1986 Western Australian state election: Mandurah
Party	Candidate	Votes	%	±%
Labor	John Read	6,449	56.4	+9.6
Liberal	Wayne McRostie	4,361	38.1	−9.9
Democrats	George Counsel	628	5.5	+5.5
Total formal votes		11,438	98.2	−0.2
Informal votes		209	1.8	+0.2
Turnout		11,647	94.0	+2.1
Two-party-preferred result
Labor	John Read	6,794	59.4	+9.1
Liberal	Wayne McRostie	4,644	40.6	−9.1
Labor hold		Swing	+9.1	

1983 Western Australian state election: Mandurah
Party	Candidate	Votes	%	±%
Liberal	Richard Shalders	4,050	48.0	
Labor	John Read	3,947	46.8	
Independent	Leonard Attwill	434	5.2	
Total formal votes		8,431	98.4	
Informal votes		133	1.6	
Turnout		8,564	91.9	
Two-party-preferred result
Labor	John Read	4,243	50.3	
Liberal	Richard Shalders	4,188	49.7	
Labor gain from Liberal		Swing		
