= Results of the 1993 Western Australian state election (Legislative Council) =

Western Australian state election, 6 February 1993 Legislative Council
| Enrolled voters | 1,016,750 | | | | |
| Votes cast | 952,426 | | Turnout | 93.67% | +2.94% |
| Informal votes | 35,643 | | Informal | 3.74% | –3.61% |
Summary of votes by party
| Party | Primary votes | % | Swing | Seats | Change |
| Liberal | 418,039 | 45.60% | +4.45% | 15 | ± 0 |
| Labor | 337,554 | 36.82% | –4.49% | 14 | – 2 |
| National | 36,614 | 3.99% | –1.01% | 3 | ± 0 |
| Greens | 47,305 | 5.16% | +1.97% | 1 | + 1 |
| Democrats | 27,640 | 3.01% | –0.31% | 0 | ± 0 |
| Grey Power | 5,937 | 0.64% | –3.38% | 0 | ± 0 |
| Other parties | 5,390 | 0.58% | –0.29% | 0 | ± 0 |
| Independent | 38,304 | 4.18% | +2.96% | 1 | ± 1 |
| Total | 916,783 | | | 34 | |

This is a list of electoral region results for the Western Australian Legislative Council in the 1993 Western Australian state election.

The Greens won their first legislative council seat. The party would win a seat at every subsequent election.

== Results by electoral region ==
=== Agricultural ===
1993 Western Australian state election: Agricultural
| Party | Candidate | Votes | % | ±% |
|---|---|---|---|---|
| Quota | | 13,162 | | |
| Liberal | 1. Bruce Donaldson (elected 1); 2. Murray Nixon (elected 4); 3. Peter Lee; 4. Steve Boylan; 5. Fran Weller | 32,176 | 40.74 | −0.55 |
| National | 1. Eric Charlton (elected 2); 2. Murray Criddle (elected 5); 3. Dascia Weckert; 4. Geoff Gill | 22,799 | 28.87 | +2.09 |
| Labor | 1. Kim Chance (elected 3); 2. John Mason; 3. Dianne Spowart; 4. John Czuzman | 18,911 | 23.95 | −1.68 |
| Greens | 1. Pete Christiansen; 2. John Phillips | 2,553 | 3.23 | −1.49 |
| Democrats | 1. Terrence Cheetham; 2. Lindsay Olman; 3. Robert Endersbee | 1,927 | 2.44 | +0.72 |
| Grey Power | Salli Vaughan | 604 | 0.76 | +0.76 |
| Total formal votes | | 78.970 | 97.88 | −0.19 |
| Informal votes | | 1,713 | 2.12 | +0.19 |
| Turnout | | 80,683 | 94.51 | |

=== East Metropolitan ===
1993 Western Australian state election: East Metropolitan
| Party | Candidate | Votes | % | ±% |
|---|---|---|---|---|
| Quota | | 32,822 | | |
| Labor | 1. Alannah MacTiernan (elected 1); 2. Tom Butler (elected 3); 3. Nick Griffiths (elected 5); 4. Michelle Roberts; 5. Valma Ferguson; 6. Paul Sulc | 90,982 | 46.20 | −1.07 |
| Liberal | 1. Peter Foss (elected 2); 2. Derrick Tomlinson (elected 4); 3. Robert Van Straalen; 4. Nicholas Bruining | 82,661 | 41.98 | +5.44 |
| Independent | John Tucak | 7,614 | 3.87 | +3.87 |
| Democrats | 1. Brian Jenkins; 2. Jean Ritter | 6,361 | 3.23 | −0.39 |
| Greens | 1. Mark Schneider; 2. Lorraine Johnston | 4,020 | 2.04 | −0.88 |
| National | 1. Mark Forecast; 2. Otto Weber | 2,835 | 1.44 | −0.86 |
| Grey Power | Arthur Robertson | 1,811 | 0.92 | −4.93 |
| Republican | Kevin Cloghan | 643 | 0.33 | +0.33 |
| Total formal votes | | 196,927 | 97.26 | +0.16 |
| Informal votes | | 5,538 | 2.74 | −0.16 |
| Turnout | | 202,465 | 94.16 | |

=== Mining and Pastoral ===
1993 Western Australian state election: Mining and Pastoral
| Party | Candidate | Votes | % | ±% |
|---|---|---|---|---|
| Quota | | 9,097 | | |
| Labor | 1. Tom Stephens (elected 1); 2. Mark Nevill (elected 3); 3. Tom Helm (elected 5); 4. Peter McKerrow; 5. Bob Couzens; 6. Paul Summers | 29,767 | 54.54 | +0.89 |
| Liberal | 1. Norman Moore (elected 2); 2. Phil Lockyer (elected 4); 3. Sally Wilkinson; 4. Sandy McTaggart | 20,115 | 36.85 | +3.26 |
| Greens | 1. Robin Chapple; 2. Keith Lockyer | 2,747 | 5.03 | +1.82 |
| Democrats | 1. Vin Cooper; 2. Shyama Peebles | 1,440 | 2.64 | −0.07 |
| Grey Power | Don Gudgeon | 511 | 0.94 | +0.94 |
| Total formal votes | | 54,580 | 97.53 | +0.11 |
| Informal votes | | 1,383 | 2.47 | −0.11 |
| Turnout | | 55,963 | 85.95 | |

=== North Metropolitan ===
1993 Western Australian state election: North Metropolitan
| Party | Candidate | Votes | % | ±% |
|---|---|---|---|---|
| Quota | | 34,161 | | |
| Liberal | 1. George Cash (elected 1); 2. Bob Pike (elected 3); 3. Max Evans (elected 5); 4. Ross Lightfoot (elected 6); 5. Iain MacLean; 6. Alan Carstairs | 143,450 | 52.49 | +7.83 |
| Labor | 1. Graham Edwards (elected 2); 2. Sam Piantadosi (elected 4); 3. John O'Connor; 4. Ed Dermer; 5. Victor Leonzini; 6. Robert McLoughlin | 78,115 | 28.58 | −10.66 |
| Greens | 1. Brenda Roy; 2. Maria Catelli | 21,161 | 7.74 | +4.69 |
| Independent | 1. Reg Davies (elected 7); 2. Adam Davies | 16,721 | 6.12 | +6.12 |
| Democrats | 1. Richard Jeffreys; 2. Sarah Gilfillan-Gray; 3. John Massam | 10,627 | 3.89 | +0.46 |
| Grey Power | Phil King | 1,753 | 0.64 | −3.70 |
| Republican | Eugene Hands | 1,459 | 0.53 | +0.53 |
| Total formal votes | | 273,286 | 93.74 | −3.34 |
| Informal votes | | 18,260 | 6.26 | +3.34 |
| Turnout | | 291,546 | 94.05 | |

=== South Metropolitan ===
1993 Western Australian state election: South Metropolitan
| Party | Candidate | Votes | % | ±% |
|---|---|---|---|---|
| Quota | | 33,876 | | |
| Liberal | 1. Clive Griffiths (elected 1); 2. Barbara Scott (elected 3); 3. Simon O'Brien; 4. Lesley Vanstan; 5. Robert Carruthers | 91,585 | 45.06 | +3.22 |
| Labor | 1. John Halden (elected 2); 2. Cheryl Davenport (elected 4); 3. Garry Kelly; 4. John Noonan; 5. Reg Gordon; 6. Tony Lovett | 81,981 | 40.33 | −3.09 |
| Greens | 1. Jim Scott (elected 5); 2. Alison de Garis | 11,191 | 5.51 | +5.51 |
| Group F | 1. Barry Hodge; 2. Kim Hodge | 5,921 | 2.91 | +2.91 |
| Democrats | 1. Don Millar; 2. Marlon Hercock | 4,995 | 2.46 | −1.83 |
| Group D | 1. Richard Utting; 2. Julie Dethridge | 2,887 | 1.42 | +1.42 |
| Call to Australia | 1. Gerard Goiran; 2. Beryl Rogers | 2,473 | 1.22 | +1.22 |
| Grey Power | Michael Hutton | 891 | 0.44 | −4.50 |
| Independent | Laurie Humphreys | 556 | 0.27 | +0.27 |
| Independent | Geoffrey Taylor | 428 | 0.21 | +0.21 |
| Republican | Veema Munroe | 346 | 0.17 | +0.17 |
| Total formal votes | | 203,254 | 97.22 | −0.21 |
| Informal votes | | 5,819 | 2.78 | +0.21 |
| Turnout | | 209,073 | 93.93 | |

=== South West ===
1993 Western Australian state election: South West
| Party | Candidate | Votes | % | ±% |
|---|---|---|---|---|
| Quota | | 13,721 | | |
| Liberal | 1. Barry House (elected 1); 2. Bill Stretch (elected 3); 3. Muriel Patterson (elected 5); 4. John Silcock; 5. Ian Mabey; 6. Peter Giumelli; 7. Gabi Ghasseb | 48,052 | 43.78 | +1.79 |
| Labor | 1. Bob Thomas (elected 2); 2. John Cowdell (elected 4); 3. Doug Wenn (elected 6); 4. Brian Procter; 5. Lois Anderson | 37,798 | 34.44 | −3.07 |
| National | 1. Murray Montgomery (elected 7); 2. David Pover; 3. Robert Teale | 10,980 | 10.00 | +0.58 |
| Greens | 1. Paul Davis; 2. Lyn Serventy | 5,633 | 5.13 | +5.13 |
| Independent | Trish Townsend | 3,113 | 2.84 | +2.84 |
| Democrats | 1. David Churches; 2. Lila Ward | 2,290 | 2.09 | −0.06 |
| Independent | Sandy Lewis | 628 | 0.57 | +0.57 |
| Grey Power | Doug Ratcliffe | 367 | 0.33 | −2.82 |
| CALM Resistance Movement | Robert Moir | 318 | 0.29 | +0.29 |
| Independent | Ted Stone | 273 | 0.25 | +0.25 |
| Independent | J J Amelia | 163 | 0.15 | +0.15 |
| Republican | Jane King | 151 | 0.14 | +0.14 |
| Total formal votes | | 109,766 | 97.40 | −0.16 |
| Informal votes | | 2,930 | 2.60 | +0.16 |
| Turnout | | 112,696 | 94.98 | |

== See also ==
- Results of the Western Australian state election, 1993 (Legislative Assembly A-L)
- Results of the Western Australian state election, 1993 (Legislative Assembly M-Z)
- 1993 Western Australian state election
- Candidates of the Western Australian state election, 1993
- Members of the Western Australian Legislative Council, 1993–1997
