= Sabine Winton =

Australian politician (born 1965)

The Honourable Sabine Winton MLA
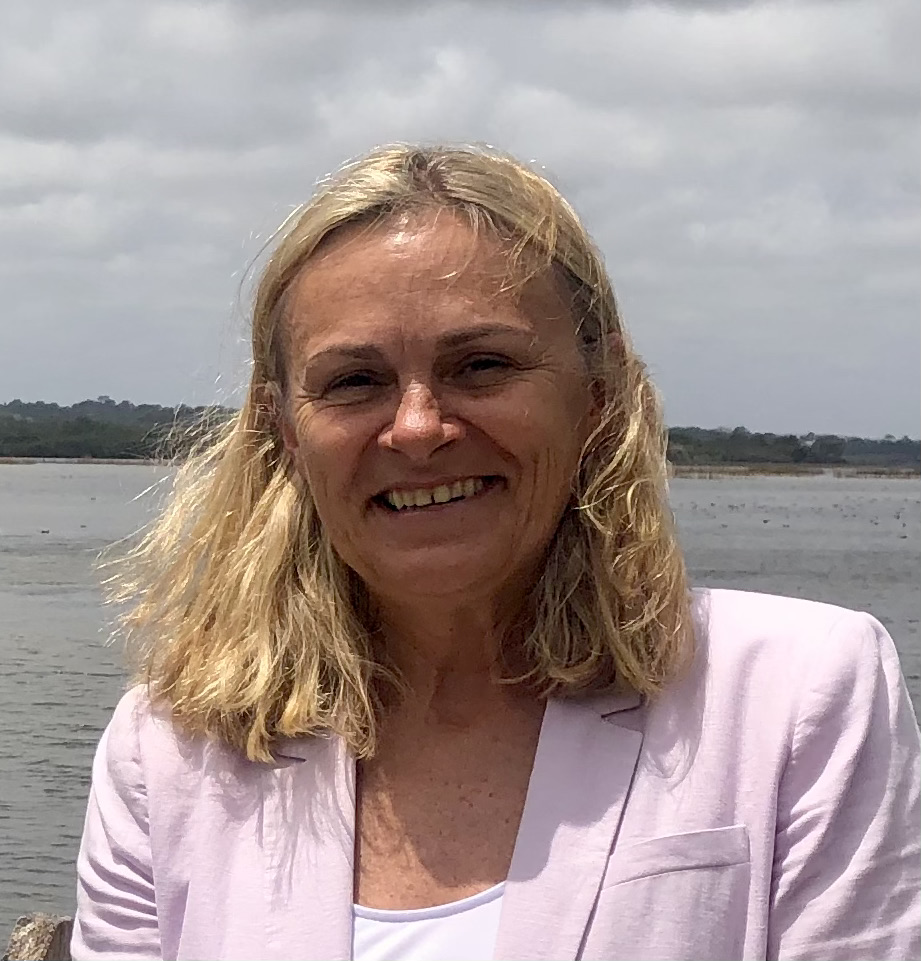

Minister for Education (Western Australia)
- Incumbent
- Assumed office 19 March 2025
- Premier: Roger Cook
- Preceded by: Tony Buti

Member of the Western Australian Legislative Assembly for Wanneroo
- Incumbent
- Assumed office 11 March 2017
- Preceded by: Paul Miles

Personal details
- Born: Sabine Elisabeth Fenn; 24 April 1965 (age 61) Ober-Ramstadt, West Germany
- Party: Labor
- Occupation: Politician, teacher
- Website: wanneroo.walabor.org.au

Sabine Elisabeth Winton (née Fenn; born 24 April 1965) is an Australian politician and former teacher. She has been a Labor member of the Western Australian Legislative Assembly since the 2017 state election, representing Wanneroo. She currently serves as the Western Australian Minister for Education; Early Childhood; Preventative Health; Wheatbelt.

Winton previously served in Cabinet as Minister for Early Childhood Education; Child Protection; Prevention of Family and Domestic Violence and Community Services from December 2022 to March 2025.

Prior to her election, Winton was a teacher for 27 years and also served on the City of Wanneroo Council from 2013 to 2017.

== Early life and teaching career ==
Winton was born in Ober-Ramstadt in West Germany. She is the daughter of Hans and Sigrid Fenn. In 1973, her family moved from Dieburg to Fairy Meadow near Wollongong, New South Wales. In 1975, Winton's family travelled across the Nullarbor Plain to settle in Yanchep, Western Australia. Winton attended Yanchep Primary School and then Wanneroo Secondary College where she was President of the Student Council. She also played netball at Wanneroo District Netball Association.

After graduating from Murdoch University with a primary teaching degree, she worked across the state, including in the Goldfields town of Norseman and Fitzroy Crossing in the Kimberley. She also worked on the Cocos Keeling Islands before relocating back to Wanneroo to start a family.

Before being elected in 2017, Winton was a primary school teacher for 27 years, and most recently held the position of Primary Extension and Challenge Coordinator (PEAC) with the Department of Education from 2005-2017, where she also achieved the status of Level 3 classroom teacher.

== Political career ==
=== Election ===
Winton was elected in the 2017 State election with a swing of 18.2% towards her, becoming one of 7 people who defeated a sitting Minister at that election.

In 2021, she was re-elected with a further swing of 19.8%, achieving a two-party preferred result of 78.4% against Paul Miles who ran again.

She was again re-elected in the 2025 Western Australian state election, becoming the first person to be elected to a third term in the seat of Wanneroo since its creation.

=== Parliamentary Appointments ===
Winton was an Acting Speaker of the Western Australian Legislative Assembly during the 40th Parliament from 16 March 2017 to 7 December 2020.

During the 40th Parliament she was also a member of the Education and Health Standing Committee. In August 2020, Winton established the WA Parliamentary Friends of Germany Group to foster friendly social and cultural ties between Western Australia and Germany and provide opportunities for Members of Parliament to establish and strengthen relationships with the German community in Western Australia.

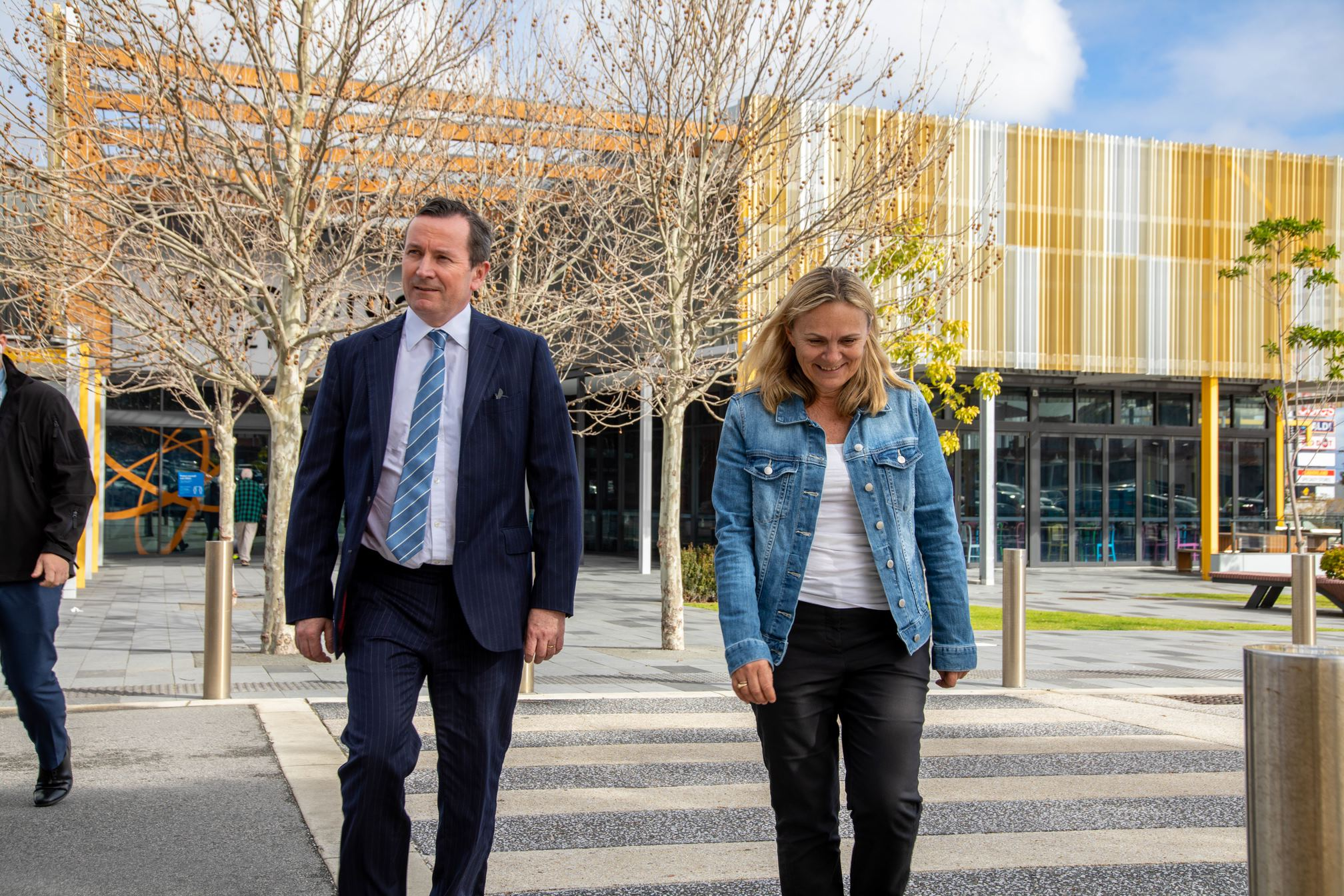
Sabine Winton MLA and Premier Mark McGowan

After the 2021 Western Australian state election Winton was promoted and appointed as the Parliamentary Secretary to the Parliamentary Secretary to the Premier; Treasurer; Minister for Public Sector Management; Federal-State Relations. As part of this role she is the Chair of the steering committee for the Aboriginal Cultural Centre project.

In December 2021 she was additional made the Parliamentary Secretary to the Deputy Premier; Minister for State Development, Jobs and Trade; Tourism; Commerce; Science.

=== Cabinet Minister ===
In December 2022, Winton was promoted to Cabinet as the Minister for Early Childhood Education; Child Protection; Prevention of Family and Domestic Violence and Community Services following a reshuffle.

Following the 2025 State Election, she was appointed Minister for Education; Early Childhood; Preventative Health; Wheatbelt.

== See also ==
- Electoral results for the district of Wanneroo

Western Australian Legislative Assembly
Preceded by Paul Miles	Member for Wanneroo; 2017–present	Incumbent
