= Emily Hamilton (politician) =

Australian politician (born 1985)

Emily Hamilton MLA

Member of the Western Australian Legislative Assembly for Joondalup
- Incumbent
- Assumed office 11 March 2017
- Preceded by: Jan Norberger

Personal details
- Born: 14 January 1985 (age 41) Perth, Western Australia
- Party: Labor
- Children: 2
- Education: Notre Dame University
- Website: www.emilyhamiltonmla.com.au

Emily Louise Hamilton (born 14 January 1985) is an Australian politician. She has been a Labor member of the Western Australian Legislative Assembly since the 2017 state election, representing the electorate of Joondalup.

== Early life and education ==
Hamilton was born in Perth in 1985, the eldest of five children, to David and Angela Hamilton. Her father is a small business owner, and her mother is a spinal trained nurse.

Hamilton graduated from Sacred Heart College, Sorento, in 2002.

Hamilton graduated with a Bachelor of Politics and Law from University of Notre Dame Australia in 2006.

== Career ==
From 2006, Hamilton spent ten years working for state Labor MPs Tony O'Gorman, Ken Travers and Laine McDonald, first as a research officer, and then as an electorate officer.

In the 2017 state election, Hamilton was the Labor Party candidate in the seat of Joondalup against the incumbent Liberal Party candidate Jan Norberger. Hamilton gained the seat, with a swing of 11%, and a margin of 1.2%.

In her maiden speech, Hamilton thanked EMILY's List for their support.

Hamilton was re-elected at the 2021 Western Australian state election with a 24.7% swing towards her, an even larger swing than the 11% swing that delivered her the seat in the 2017 election.

== Personal life ==
Hamilton has a daughter (born circa 2006), and a son (born circa 2009).

Western Australian Legislative Assembly
Preceded by Jan Norberger	Member for Joondalup; 2017–present	Incumbent
