= Chris Baker (politician) =

Australian politician (1958–2023)

Chris Baker MLA

Member of the Western Australian Legislative Assembly for Joondalup
- In office 14 December 1996 – 10 February 2001
- Preceded by: New seat
- Succeeded by: Tony O'Gorman

Personal details
- Born: 9 July 1958 Brisbane, Queensland, Australia
- Died: 4 August 2023 (aged 65) Perth, Western Australia, Australia
- Party: Liberal Party
- Spouse: Sarah Jane Rogers
- Children: 1 son and 1 daughter
- Education: University of Queensland; Queensland University of Technology

Christopher John Baker (9 July 1958 – 4 August 2023) was an Australian solicitor and politician who was a member of the Liberal Party, a Member of the Western Australian Legislative Assembly (1996–2001), and City of Joondalup councillor (2001–2004). He was a City of Wanneroo Councillor until his death in 2023.

Baker was born in Brisbane and moved to Western Australia in 1989. Prior to entering parliament as the member for the newly created seat of Joondalup, he was a barrister, solicitor and proprietor of a law firm. Baker also served as a Councillor in the Town of Port Hedland from 1994–1996.

In parliament, he was involved in a number of committees, including the Public Accounts Committee. He lost the seat at the February 2001 state election to his Labor rival, Tony O'Gorman.

On 5 May 2001, Baker was elected as councillor for the Marina ward of Joondalup with an overwhelming majority of votes. He was one of a group of councillors who supported the controversial CEO, Denis Smith, and was criticised by the inquiry into the City of Joondalup.

Baker's career as a solicitor has involved practicing law in Darwin, Katherine and Esperance in the late 1980s, and later as proprietor of law firm Chris Baker and Associates. Baker is a Notary Public from the Supreme Court of WA.

On 19 October 2019, Baker was elected as a Councillor at the City of Wanneroo for the North Coast Ward, defeating incumbent Russell Driver by 5.82%, or 1,131 votes, and secured 3.25% more votes than incumbent Natalie Sangalli, who was re-elected to the second vacant position.
