= Rhys Williams (Australian politician) =

Rhys Williams MLA

Member of the Western Australian Legislative Assembly for Mandurah
- Incumbent
- Assumed office 8 March 2025
- Preceded by: David Templeman

Mayor of Mandurah
- In office October 2017 – January 2025
- Deputy: Caroline Knight
- Preceded by: Marina Vergone
- Succeeded by: Caroline Knight (acting)

City of Mandurah Councillor
- In office October 2009 – October 2013
- Constituency: Coastal Ward

Personal details
- Party: Labor
- Website: rhyswilliams.com.au

Rhys Williams is an Australian politician who has been the member for Mandurah in the Western Australian Legislative Assembly since the March 2025 state election. A member of the Labor Party, he was the mayor of the City of Mandurah from October 2017 to January 2025 and a City of Mandurah councillor from October 2009 to October 2013.

== Career ==
Williams was elected to the Coastal Ward of the City of Mandurah council for a four-year term in October 2009 at the age of 21, making him the youngest councillor in Mandurah's history. In October 2013, Williams lost the Mandurah mayoral election to Marina Vergone by two votes. Four years later, he was elected mayor of Mandurah, receiving 50.12 percent of the vote and beating three other candidates, including incumbent mayor Vergone. Williams was re-elected in October 2021 with 85.54 percent of the vote against one other candidate.

In 2015, Williams was awarded the Western Australian of the Year Youth Award.

In September 2024, the Labor MP for the electoral district of Mandurah, David Templeman, announced he would not contest the 2025 state election. The following day, Williams announced he would seek Labor Party preselection, and in October 2024, he was preselected as the party's candidate for Mandurah. He stepped down as mayor in January 2025, with deputy mayor Caroline Knight acting as mayor until the October 2025 local government election. The Labor Party has used Williams' resignation as mayor to criticise the Liberal Party's Churchlands candidate, Basil Zempilas, for not resigning as lord mayor of Perth. The election on 8 March 2025 resulted in Williams retaining the seat of Mandurah for Labor.

Williams is part of the Labor Party's Left faction and is aligned with the Australian Manufacturing Workers Union.

Western Australian Legislative Assembly
Preceded by David Templeman	Member for Mandurah; 2025–present	Incumbent
