= Paul Miles (politician) =

Australian politician

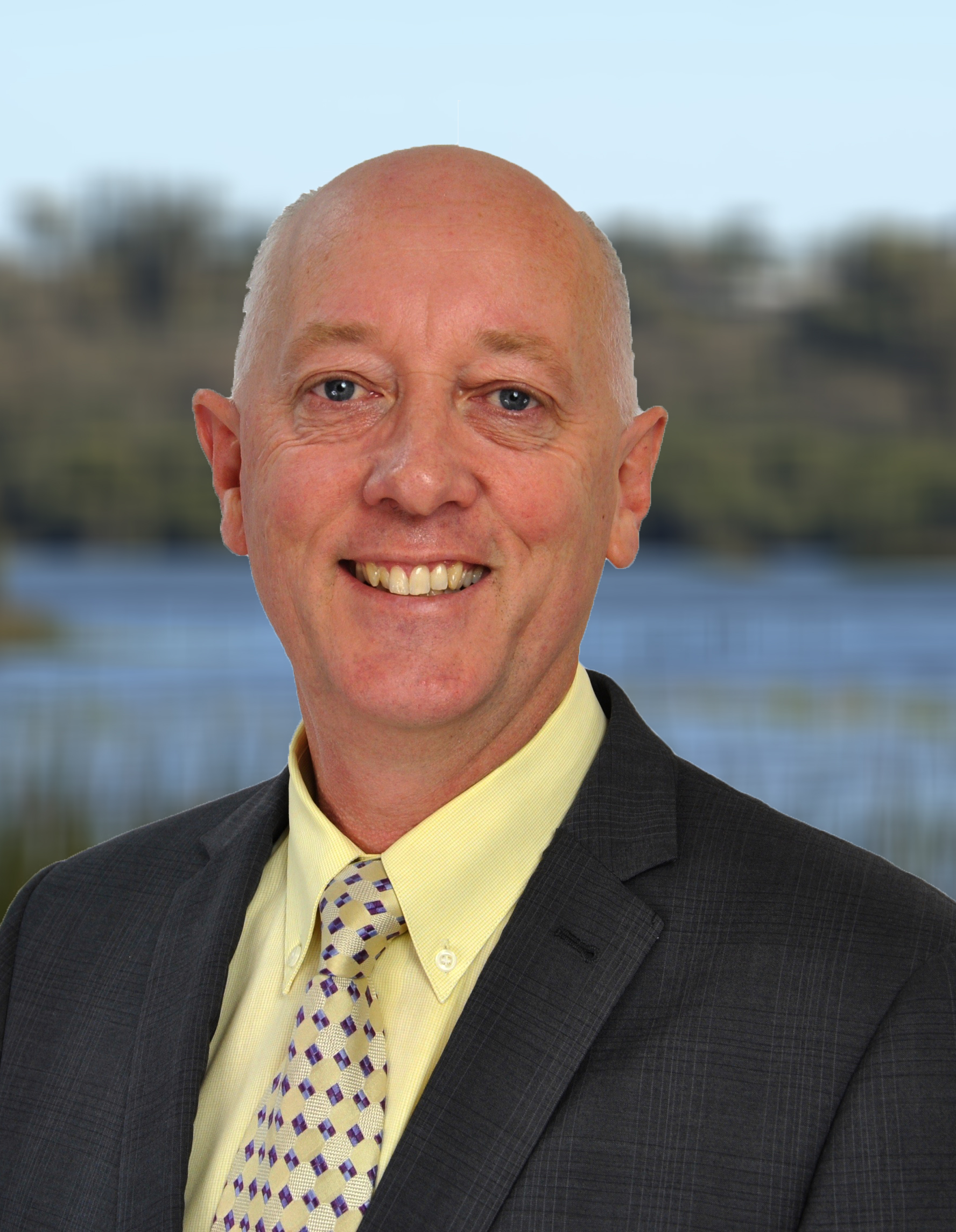

Member of the Western Australian Legislative Assembly for Wanneroo
- In office 6 September 2008 – 11 March 2017
- Preceded by: Dianne Guise
- Succeeded by: Sabine Winton

Minister for Local Government
- In office 22 September 2016 – 17 March 2017
- Premier: Colin Barnett
- Preceded by: Tony Simpson
- Succeeded by: David Templeman

Minister for Community Services
- In office 22 September 2016 – 17 March 2017
- Premier: Colin Barnett
- Preceded by: Tony Simpson
- Succeeded by: Simone McGurk

Minister for Seniors and Volunteering
- In office 22 September 2016 – 17 March 2017
- Premier: Colin Barnett
- Preceded by: Tony Simpson
- Succeeded by: Mick Murray

Minister for Youth
- In office 22 September 2016 – 17 March 2017
- Premier: Colin Barnett
- Preceded by: Tony Simpson
- Succeeded by: Peter Tinley

Personal details
- Born: Paul Terrance Miles; 16 February 1963 (age 63) Wimbledon, England
- Party: Liberal
- Profession: Member of Parliament, Former Technician

Paul Terrance Miles (born 16 February 1963) Western Australian politician. Liberal member of the Western Australian Legislative Assembly from 2008 to 2017, representing Wanneroo. He won the seat after defeating sitting Labor MLA Dianne Guise. Paul Miles was appointed Parliamentary Secretary to the Minister for Commerce in 2013 to 2016, in the Barnett Ministry. Then was appointed Minister for Local Government, Minister for Community Services, Minister for Seniors and Volunteering, and Minister for Youth in September 2016.

== Biography ==
Paul Miles was born in the United Kingdom to parents, Beryl and Alan Miles. The family migrated to Perth, Australia in 1970. He is one of five siblings, and grew up in the suburbs of Balcatta and Girrawheen.

Paul Miles attended Osborne Park Primary School when he arrived in Perth at age 7 then when the family moved to the then new suburb of Girrawheen attended Montrose Primary School then finished his schooling at Girrawheen Senior High School.

== Political career ==
Prior to his election the Legislative Assembly, Miles was a local government Councillor for the North Ward of the City of Wanneroo. Miles contested the 2005 Western Australian state election unsuccessfully and then successfully in 2008 and 2013.

He was defeated in 2017 by Sabine Winton, suffering an 18.2% swing against him, one of the largest in entire State, and was one of 7 sitting Ministers to be defeated.

He contested the seat again, for the 5th time, at the 2021 State election. He was the only former MP who was defeated in 2017 to be recycled as a candidate for the 2021 election. He contested Mindarie in the 2025 state election.

In October 2021, he was elected again to the City of Wanneroo, this time to the Central-East Ward.

When Paul Miles left state politics he was elected as a Councillor for the City of Wanneroo Local Government for the Central Ward in 2017, then Re-Elected for Council In October 2021, this time to the Central-East Ward. And just was re-elected again for the Central-East Ward in 2025. Then the City of Wanneroo council elected Cr Paul Miles to be Deputy Mayor.

Western Australian Legislative Assembly
Preceded by Dianne Guise	Member for Wanneroo; 2008–2017	Succeeded by Sabine Winton
Political offices
Preceded by Tony Simpson	Minister for Local Government; 2016–2017	Succeeded by David Templeman
Preceded by Tony Simpson	Minister for Community Services; 2016–2017	Succeeded by Simone McGurk
Preceded by Tony Simpson	Minister for Seniors and Volunteering; 2016–2017	Succeeded by Mick Murray
Preceded by Tony Simpson	Minister for Youth; 2016–2017	Succeeded by Peter Tinley
