= Iain MacLean (politician) =

Australian politician (1953–2008)

Iain Douglas MacLean (14 November 1953 – 27 December 2008) was an Australian politician.

He was born in Perth and was educated at Kent Street Senior High School. He was a stores and warehouse administration worker before entering politics. A member of the Liberal Party, in 1994 he was elected in a countback to the Western Australian Legislative Council for North Metropolitan. In 1996 he resigned to run for the Legislative Assembly seat of Wanneroo, which he held until his defeat in 2001. MacLean died in 2008.

Western Australian Legislative Assembly
Preceded by Wayde Smith	Member for Wanneroo; 1996–2001	Succeeded by Dianne Guise
