= Electoral district of Joondalup =

State electoral district of Western Australia

Joondalup Western Australia—Legislative Assembly
- Interactive map of electoral district boundaries from the 2025 state election
- State: Western Australia
- Dates current: 1983–1989; 1996–present
- MP: Emily Hamilton
- Party: Labor
- Namesake: Joondalup
- Electors: 33,047 (2025)
- Area: 34 km^{2} (13.1 sq mi)
- Demographic: Metropolitan
- Coordinates: 31.76°S 115.77°E
Electorates around Joondalup:
Mindarie	Mindarie	Wanneroo
Indian Ocean	Joondalup	Wanneroo
Indian Ocean	Hillarys	Kingsley

Joondalup is an electoral district of the Legislative Assembly in the Australian state of Western Australia. The district is located in the northern suburbs of Perth.

Joondalup has tended to be a marginal seat, having been marginal from 1996 until 2021, when it became a safe seat for the first time since 1986.

== Geography ==
The district lies in Perth's outer north, taking in areas west of Lake Joondalup. The seat includes the suburbs of Connolly, Edgewater, Joondalup, Heathridge, Ocean Reef, Iluka as well as part of the suburb of Currambine.

== History ==
Joondalup was first created for the 1983 state election when it was won by Labor candidate Jackie Watkins, who held the seat for two terms. Joondalup was abolished and replaced by the new seat of Wanneroo ahead of the 1989 state election, at which point Watkins became the member for Wanneroo.

The seat was recreated for the 1996 state election when it was won by Liberal Party candidate Chris Baker. Baker was defeated after one term by Labor candidate Tony O'Gorman at the 2001 state election. O'Gorman held the seat until he was defeated at the 2013 state election by Liberal candidate Jan Norberger. Norberger was unable to overcome the Labor landslide at the 2017 state election and was defeated by Labor candidate Emily Hamilton after only one term.

The district boundaries were redistributed in 2019 which saw the suburbs of Beldon and Mullaloo removed from Joondalup electoral district and Iluka and part of Joondalup were added.

== Members for Joondalup ==
Joondalup (1983–1989)
Member	Party	Term
Jackie Watkins	Labor	1983–1989
Joondalup (1996–present)
Member	Party	Term
Chris Baker	Liberal	1996–2001
Tony O'Gorman	Labor	2001–2013
Jan Norberger	Liberal	2013–2017
Emily Hamilton	Labor	2017–present

== Election results ==
2025 Western Australian state election: Joondalup
Party	Candidate	Votes	%	±%
Labor	Emily Hamilton	12,274	44.0	−22.5
Liberal	Michael Dudek	9,782	35.1	+15.9
Greens	Brian Sova	2,229	8.0	+3.4
Christians	Trevor Bartley	927	3.3	+1.0
Legalise Cannabis	Samantha Law	847	3.0	+1.4
Animal Justice	Neil Jensen	612	2.2	+2.2
Independent	Nicole Butler	561	2.0	+2.0
Shooters, Fishers, Farmers	Michael Kannis	337	1.2	+1.2
Stop Pedophiles	M. Waghorn	323	1.2	+1.2
Total formal votes		27,892	95.8	−0.5
Informal votes		1,226	4.2	+0.5
Turnout		29,118	88.1	+3.9
Two-party-preferred result
Labor	Emily Hamilton	15,685	56.3	−19.2
Liberal	Michael Dudek	12,196	43.7	+19.2
Labor hold		Swing	−19.2	
