= Jan Norberger =

Australian politician

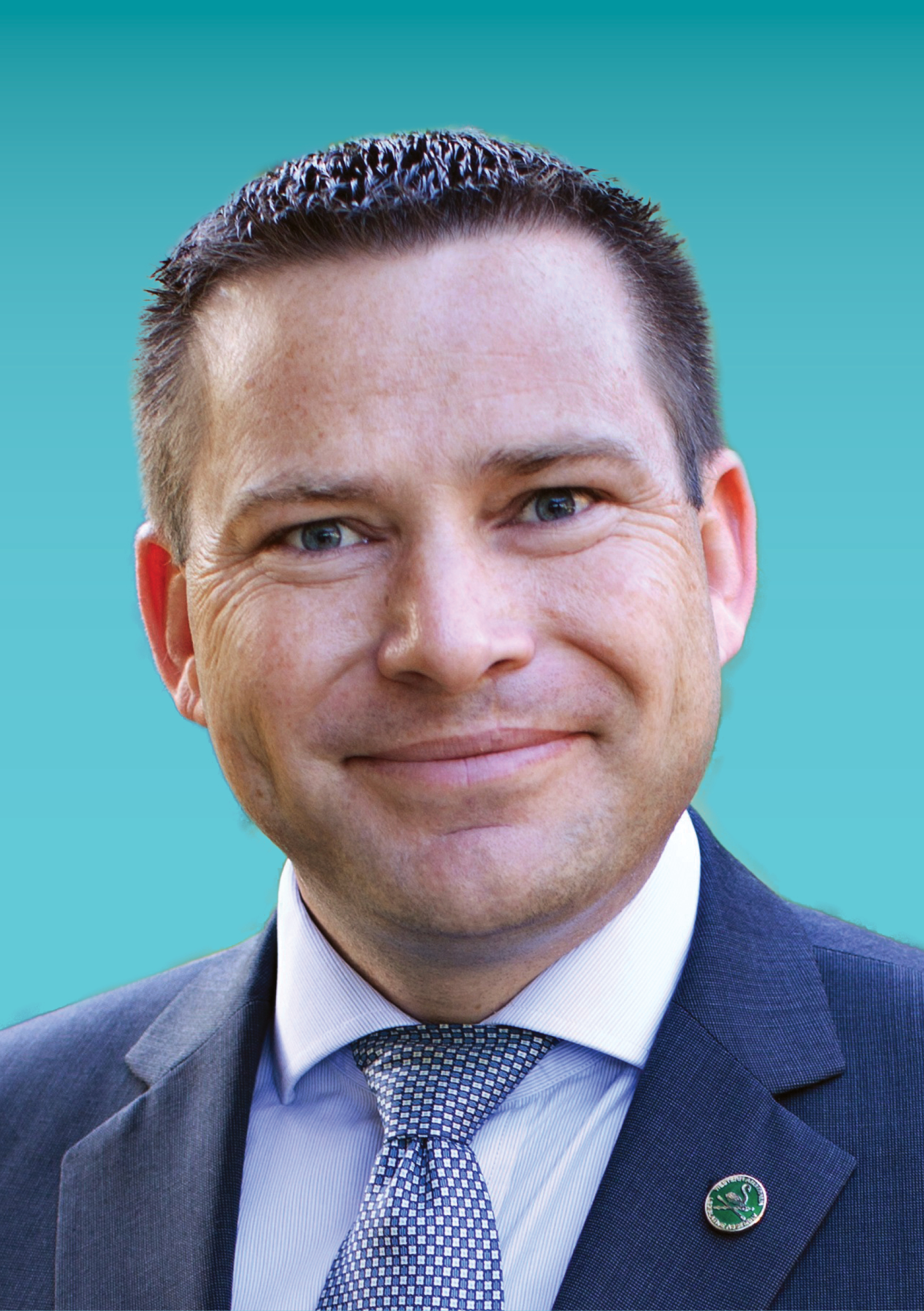

Member of the Western Australian Legislative Assembly for Joondalup
- In office 9 March 2013 – 11 March 2017
- Preceded by: Tony O'Gorman
- Succeeded by: Emily Hamilton

Personal details
- Born: Jan-Henrik Norberger; 7 March 1975 (age 51) Hamburg, Germany
- Party: Liberal
- Spouse: Mira
- Children: 2
- Education: Curtin University
- Profession: General Manager

Military service
- Allegiance: Australia
- Branch/service: Royal Australian Air Force
- Years of service: 1995 - 2001
- Rank: Corporal

Jan-Henrik Norberger (born in Hamburg, Germany on 7 March 1975) is an Australian politician. He was the member for the Western Australian Legislative Assembly seat of Joondalup from 2013 to 2017, representing the Liberal Party. In 2024, Norberger was announced as the Liberal Party's candidate for the federal seat of Pearce in the 2025 Australian federal election.

== Early life and education ==
Norberger was born in Hamburg, Germany, on 7 March 1975, to Lothar and Baerbel Norberger. He has two sisters. In 1982, his family emigrated from Germany to Perth, Western Australia, where his family built their first home in Ocean Reef, and later moved to Edgewater.

Norberger attended Mullaloo Heights Primary School and Prendiville Catholic College, graduating in 1992. He enrolled in an Advanced Diploma of Applied Science (Computing) at Central TAFE, Perth, however did not complete the course.

In 2016 he graduated from Curtin University with a Masters in Business Administration, and an Advanced Diploma of Accounting from North Metropolitan TAFE.

In 2005 he married his wife, Mira, and in 2012 their son was born.

== Career ==
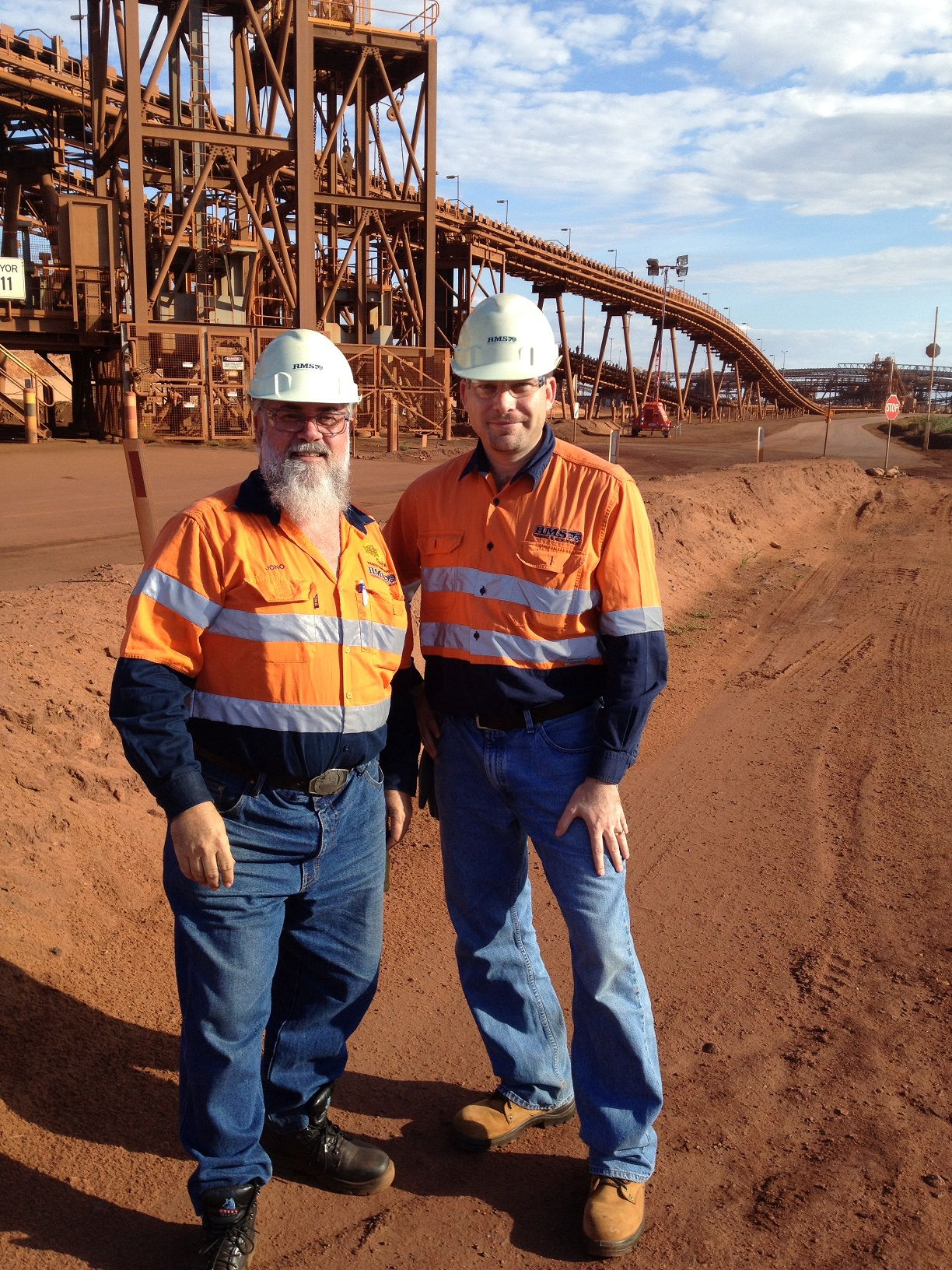
Richards Mining Services

Norberger's first job was weeding at Instant Gardens, Wanneroo.

In 1995, Norberger joined the Royal Australian Air Force as a Communications and Information Systems Controller (CISCON). He served in the RAAF for six years, until 2001, attaining the rank of Corporal.

In 2002, Norberger became the General Manager at Timor Aviation Services and DHL East Timor in Dili, East Timor.

In 2005, Norberger returned to Perth and became State Commercial Manager at Toll Priority. In 2007 he joined Richards Mining Services as General Manager. In this role, he was awarded the WA Business News 40under40 award in 2012, for providing training and employment opportunities to the indigenous community.

== Political career ==
On 10 March 2012, Norberger was endorsed as the Liberal Party's candidate for the seat of Joondalup, which had been held by Labor MP Tony O'Gorman since 2001. At the 2013 state election Norberger was elected, with a 7.8% swing to the Liberals, a 4.5% margin, and 50.3% of the primary vote.

Norberger was sworn in as the Member for Joondalup on 11 April 2013. He was a serving member of the Economics and Industry Standing Committee.

A redrawing of state electoral boundaries in December 2015 saw the seat of Joondalup cede the suburbs of Craigie and Joondalup and gain Mullaloo and Ocean Reef. These boundary changes had the effect of strengthening the Liberal Party's margin in the seat to 10.4%.

On 29 March 2016 Premier Colin Barnett promoted Norberger to Parliamentary Secretary to the Minister for Planning; Disability Services as part of his broader cabinet re-shuffle.

In 2017, Norberger was one of a number of MPs embroiled in controversy related to attempts to 'branch stack' the Liberal Party according to faith. He is a member of the Pentecostal Globalheart Church, along with Environment Minister Albert Jacob, and MP for Moore Ian Goodenough, while the directors of Globalheart Church, David and Cindy Harding, are vice-presidents of the Liberal Party's Moore Division. Norberger and Jacob employed members of Globalheart as staff once they entered parliament. Norberger and Jacob are involved with Kingdom First, the church's business networking group.

In the 2017 state election Norberger lost his seat to Labor candidate Emily Hamilton, with a swing of 11%, and a margin of 1.2%.

As of 2024, Norberger is a board member for Tenacious House, a drug rehabilitation therapeutic community run by Globalheart Church.

In 2024, Norberger was announced as the Liberal Party's candidate for the federal seat of Pearce in the 2025 Australian federal election. He was unsuccessful, with Tracey Roberts retaining the seat.

Western Australian Legislative Assembly
Preceded by Tony O'Gorman	Member for Joondalup; 2013–2017	Succeeded by Emily Hamilton
