= Electoral district of Wanneroo =

State electoral district of Perth, Western Australia

Wanneroo Western Australia—Legislative Assembly
- Interactive map of electoral district boundaries from the 2025 state election
- State: Western Australia
- Dates current: 1989–present
- MP: Sabine Winton
- Party: Labor
- Namesake: Wanneroo
- Electors: 33,073 (2025)
- Area: 413 km^{2} (159.5 sq mi)
- Demographic: Metropolitan
- Coordinates: 31.73°S 115.80°E
Electorates around Wanneroo:
| Butler | Mid-West | Mid-West |
| Mindarie | Wanneroo | Swan Hills |
| Joondalup | Kingsley | Landsdale |

Wanneroo is an electoral district of the Legislative Assembly in the Australian state of Western Australia.

The district is located in the northern suburbs of Perth.

Wanneroo is a traditionally a marginal seat; it has been held by the government of the day on every occasion since its creation in 1989. However, at the 2021 state election, which resulted in a second consecutive landslide for Mark McGowan, the marginal trend was broken and Wanneroo became a very safe seat for the Labor Party. Despite this, the seat still retains its status as a bellwether seat.

== Geography ==
Wanneroo is based in the outer northern suburbs of Perth. It includes the suburbs of Ashby, Banksia Grove, Carramar, Gnangara, Hocking, Jandabup, Madeley, Mariginiup, Pearsall, Sinagra, Tapping, Wangara and Wanneroo.

== History ==
Wanneroo was first created for the 1989 state election. It replaced the abolished seat of Joondalup, and was won by Labor MP Jackie Watkins, then the member for Joondalup. Watkins lost the seat one term later when Labor lost government at the 1993 state election. The seat remained in Liberal Party hands for two terms until the party lost government at the 2001 state election. This pattern asserted itself again at the 2008 state election when Labor's two term hold on the seat ended with the defeat of the Labor government.

== Members for Wanneroo ==
| Member | Party | Term |
|---|---|---|
| Jackie Watkins | Labor | 1989–1993 |
| Wayde Smith | Liberal | 1993–1996 |
| Iain MacLean | Liberal | 1996–2001 |
| Dianne Guise | Labor | 2001–2008 |
| Paul Miles | Liberal | 2008–2017 |
| Sabine Winton | Labor | 2017–present |

== Election results ==
2025 Western Australian state election: Wanneroo
| Party | Candidate | Votes | % | ±% |
|---|---|---|---|---|
| Labor | Sabine Winton | 13,585 | 50.9 | −21.0 |
| Liberal | Joshua Kingshott | 7,557 | 28.3 | +10.0 |
| Greens | Martin Dupont | 2,302 | 8.6 | +4.1 |
| Legalise Cannabis | Kunal Naresh Parbat | 1,367 | 5.1 | +5.1 |
| Christians | Hendrik Holtzhausen | 1,244 | 4.7 | +4.7 |
| Shooters, Fishers, Farmers | Trevor Ruwoldt | 629 | 2.4 | +2.4 |
| Total formal votes | | 26,684 | 95.2 | −0.5 |
| Informal votes | | 1,342 | 4.8 | +0.5 |
| Turnout | | 28,026 | 84.7 | +3.5 |
Two-party-preferred result
| Labor | Sabine Winton | 16,661 | 62.5 | −16.0 |
| Liberal | Joshua Kingshott | 10,013 | 37.5 | +16.0 |
| Labor hold | | Swing | −16.0 | |
