= Tony O'Gorman =

Australian politician (born 1958)

Deputy Speaker of the Western Australian Legislative Assembly
- In office 26 September 2002 – 9 March 2013; Alongside John Quigley (2002–2008), Wendy Duncan (2008–2013)
- Speaker: Fred Riebeling; Grant Woodhams
- Preceded by: George Strickland
- Succeeded by: Lisa Baker

Member of the Western Australian Legislative Assembly for Joondalup
- In office 10 February 2001 – 9 March 2013
- Preceded by: Chris Baker
- Succeeded by: Jan Norberger

Personal details
- Born: Anthony Patrick O'Gorman; 13 March 1958 (age 68) Birmingham, England
- Party: Labor
- Children: 4; including Jessica
- Education: St. Patrick's Comprehensive School, Shannon, County Clare; Limerick Institute of Technology
- Occupation: Administrative manager (Self-employed)
- Profession: Businessman politician

Anthony Patrick O'Gorman (born 13 March 1958) is a former Western Australian politician. Since October 2023, O'Gorman has been the president of the Shire of Dandaragan.

O'Gorman was a Labor Party member of the Western Australian Legislative Assembly from February 2001 to March 2013, representing the constituency of Joondalup. He was the Labor party's candidate for the division of Moore in 2019.

His daughter, Jessica Stojkovski, currently represents Kingsley in the WA Legislative Assembly.

Western Australian Legislative Assembly
Preceded by Chris Baker	Member for Joondalup; 2001–2013	Succeeded by Jan Norberger
