= David Templeman =

Australian politician (born 1965)

The Honourable David Templeman AM

Minister for Local Government
- In office 17 March 2017 – 19 March 2021
- Premier: Mark McGowan
- Preceded by: Paul Miles
- Succeeded by: John Carey

Minister for Heritage
- In office 17 March 2017 – 19 March 2025.
- Premier: Mark McGowan; Roger Cook
- Preceded by: Albert Jacob
- Succeeded by: Simone McGurk

Minister for Culture and the Arts
- In office 17 March 2017 – 19 March 2025
- Premier: Mark McGowan; Roger Cook
- Preceded by: John Day
- Succeeded by: Simone McGurk

Minister for International Education
- In office 21 December 2021 – 19 March 2025
- Premier: Mark McGowan; Roger Cook
- Preceded by: John Day
- Succeeded by: Tony Buti

Member of the Western Australian Legislative Assembly for Mandurah
- In office 10 February 2001 – 5 February 2025
- Preceded by: Roger Nicholls
- Succeeded by: Rhys Williams

Personal details
- Born: David Alan Templeman; 21 November 1965 (age 60) Northam, Western Australia
- Party: Labor
- Education: WACAE
- Website: www.davidtempleman.com.au

David Alan Templeman (born 21 November 1965) is a former Australian politician who was a Labor Party member of the Legislative Assembly of Western Australia from 2001 to 2025, representing the seat of Mandurah.

== Early life ==
Templeman was born in Northam, Western Australia, to Beryl Ann Templeman, née Bates, and John Thomas Templeman, boilermaker. He attended Northam Senior High School before going on to the Western Australian College of Advanced Education (now Edith Cowan University) to study teaching. Before entering politics, Templeman worked as a schoolteacher, teaching at primary schools in Three Springs, Warnbro, and Mandurah. He also served on the Mandurah City Council between 1994 and 2001, including as deputy mayor from 1997.

== Political career ==
Templeman first ran for parliament at the 1993 state election, but lost to the sitting Liberal member, Roger Nicholls. He re-contested the seat against Nicholls at the 2001 state election, and was successful. Templeman was re-elected at the 2005 election with an increased majority, and was subsequently made a whip in the government of Geoff Gallop. When Alan Carpenter replaced Gallop as premier in January 2006, he was made Minister for Community Development, Minister for Seniors and Volunteering, and Minister for Youth. In a December 2006 reshuffle, he lost the youth portfolio to Ljiljanna Ravlich, but was instead made Minister for Child Protection (a new title) and Minister for Peel. Another reshuffle occurred in March 2007, after which Templeman's titles became Minister for the Environment, Minister for Climate Change, and Minister for Peel. He remained in the ministry until the Labor government's defeat at the 2008 state election. When the Western Australian Labor Party won government in the 2017 state election, Templeman took on three ministries—Culture and the Arts, Local Government, and Heritage—and was appointed Leader of the House. In this role, he delivered a parody of The Sound of Silence by Simon and Garfunkel.

Templeman was appointed a Member of the Order of Australia in the 2026 King's Birthday Honours in recognition of his "significant service to the arts, and to the people and Parliament of Western Australia".

== See also ==
- Carpenter Ministry

Western Australian Legislative Assembly
Preceded by Roger Nicholls	Member for Mandurah; 2001–2025	Succeeded by Rhys Williams
Political offices
Preceded by Sheila McHale	Minister for Community Development; 2006–2007	Succeeded by Sue Ellery
Preceded by Margaret Quirk	Minister for Seniors and Volunteering; 2006–2007	Succeeded by Sue Ellery
Preceded by Mark McGowan	Minister for Youth; 2006	Succeeded by Ljiljanna Ravlich
New creation	Minister for Child Protection; 2006–2007	Succeeded by Sue Ellery
Preceded by Mark McGowan	Minister for Peel; 2006–2008	Abolished
Preceded by Tony McRae	Minister for the Environment; 2007–2008	Succeeded by Donna Faragher
Preceded by Tony McRae	Minister for Climate Change; 2007–2008	Abolished
Preceded by Paul Miles	Minister for Local Government; 2017–2021	Succeeded by John Carey
Preceded by Albert Jacob	Minister for Heritage; 2017–present	Incumbent
Preceded by John Day	Minister for Culture and the Arts; 2017–present	Incumbent
Preceded by Paul Papalia	Minister for Tourism; 2021–present	Incumbent
