= Wayde Smith =

Australian politician

Wayde Shannon Smith (born 19 April 1954) is a former Australian politician.

Born in Western Australia, he served on Wanneroo City Council from 1990 to 1993. In 1993 he was elected to the Western Australian Legislative Assembly as the Liberal member for Wanneroo. He lost preselection for the 1996 election as he was drawn into controversy surrounding the operation of Wanneroo City Council; he was convicted of perjury in November 1997 and sentenced to 18 months imprisonment. He was released on 30 April 1998.

Smith appealed against his conviction in the Supreme Court of Western Australia, Court of Criminal Appeal, however the appeal was rejected by the court.

Western Australian Legislative Assembly
Preceded by Jackie Watkins	Member for Wanneroo; 1993–1996	Succeeded by Iain MacLean
