= Roger Nicholls =

Australian politician

Roger Keith Nicholls (born 22 April 1956) is a former Australian politician.

He was born in Corrigin, Western Australia, and was involved in the Royal Australian Navy and in the mining industry before entering politics. In 1989 he was elected to the Western Australian Legislative Assembly as the Liberal member for Mandurah. He was promoted to the front bench in 1990 as Shadow Minister for the Family, Seniors and Peel Regional Development, and following the Liberal win in 1993 he became Minister for Community Development, the Family and Seniors before moving to Water Resources in 1995. He stepped down from the front bench in 1997 and was defeated in 2001.

Western Australian Legislative Assembly
Preceded by John Read	Member for Mandurah; 1989–2001	Succeeded by David Templeman
