= Jackie Watkins =

Australian politician

Member of the Western Australian Legislative Assembly for Joondalup
- In office 19 February 1983 – 4 February 1989
- Preceded by: District created
- Succeeded by: District abolished

Member of the Western Australian Legislative Assembly for Wanneroo
- In office 4 February 1989 – 6 February 1993
- Preceded by: District created
- Succeeded by: Wayde Smith

Personal details
- Born: Jacqueline Patricia Fletcher; 3 June 1949 (age 76) London, England, United Kingdom
- Citizenship: Australian
- Party: Australian Labor Party
- Spouses: Ross Watkins (m. 1968–1984) Jim McKiernan (m. 1985–2018)
- Children: Four
- Occupation: Secretary, receptionist, childcare worker

Jacqueline Patricia Watkins (born 3 June 1949) was elected to the Parliament of Western Australia on 19 February 1983 as the Labor Party Member for Joondalup. Watkins served as the Member for Joondalup until 4 February 1989. From 4 February 1989 to 6 February 1993 she served as the Member for Wanneroo until the election of the Court Liberal Government.

Watkins married WA Labor Senator Jim McKiernan and later was known as Jackie McKiernan.
