= Dianne Guise =

Australian politician (born 1952)

- In office 10 February 2001 – 6 September 2008
- Preceded by: Iain McLean
- Succeeded by: Paul Miles
- Constituency: Wanneroo

Personal details
- Born: 29 October 1952 (age 73) Melbourne, Victoria
- Party: Labor Party

Dianne Joy Guise (born 29 October 1952) is an Australian politician. She was a Labor member of the Western Australian Legislative Assembly from 2001 to 2008, representing the district of Wanneroo.

Born in Melbourne, Guise was formerly the President of the WA Council of State School Organisations.

Guise was first elected to parliament at the 2001 state election, defeating sitting Liberal MP Iain McLean. Guise was re-elected at the 2005 election, defeating Liberal candidate Paul Miles. From 2001 to 2008, Guise served Deputy Speaker of the Legislative Assembly and the Chairman of Committees.

Seeking a third term at the 2008 election, Guise was defeated by her 2005 opponent, Paul Miles of the Liberal Party.
