= Electoral results for the district of Kingsley =

Western Australian district election results

This is a list of electoral results for the electoral district of Kingsley in Western Australian state elections.

== Members for Kingsley ==
Member	Party	Term
Cheryl Edwardes	Liberal	1989–2005
Judy Hughes	Labor	2005–2008
Andrea Mitchell	Liberal	2008–2017
Jessica Stojkovski	Labor	2017–present

== Election results ==
=== Elections in the 2020s ===
2025 Western Australian state election: Kingsley
Party	Candidate	Votes	%	±%
Labor	Jessica Stojkovski	11,714	42.3	−18.2
Liberal	Scott Edwardes	10,420	37.6	+7.4
Greens	Sheridan Young	3,027	10.9	+5.4
One Nation	Natalie Whitten	917	3.3	+1.6
Christians	Josephine Bartley	707	2.6	+2.6
Independent	Martyn Shipton	635	2.3	+2.3
Shooters, Fishers, Farmers	Adam Johnson	280	1.0	+1.0
Total formal votes		27,700	96.3	−0.5
Informal votes		1,079	3.7	+0.5
Turnout		28,779	91.0	+3.0
Two-party-preferred result
Labor	Jessica Stojkovski	13,112	53.7	−13.2
Liberal	Scott Edwardes	11,314	46.3	+13.2
Labor hold		Swing	−13.2	

Results are not final. Last updated on 25 March 2025 at 7:00 PM AWST

2021 Western Australian state election: Kingsley
Party	Candidate	Votes	%	±%
Labor	Jessica Stojkovski	15,883	60.5	+19.6
Liberal	Scott Edwardes	7,925	30.2	−12.4
Greens	Isabella Tripp	1,461	5.6	−4.4
One Nation	Concetta Webber	436	1.7	+1.7
No Mandatory Vaccination	Lynda Crawford	373	1.4	+1.4
WAxit	Dianne McGarry	164	0.6	−0.9
Total formal votes		26,242	96.8	+0.9
Informal votes		871	3.2	−0.9
Turnout		27,113	90.2	−1.5
Two-party-preferred result
Labor	Jessica Stojkovski	17,548	66.9	+15.7
Liberal	Scott Edwardes	8,687	33.1	−15.7
Labor hold		Swing	+15.7	

=== Elections in the 2010s ===
2017 Western Australian state election: Kingsley
Party	Candidate	Votes	%	±%
Liberal	Andrea Mitchell	9,814	43.1	−16.2
Labor	Jessica Stojkovski	9,305	40.9	+11.1
Greens	Matthew Ward	2,208	9.7	+1.2
Christians	Gilbert Burnside	655	2.9	+0.5
Matheson for WA	John McNair	473	2.1	+2.1
Micro Business	Dominic Staltari	323	1.4	+1.4
Total formal votes		22,778	95.9	+1.4
Informal votes		963	4.1	−1.4
Turnout		23,741	91.0	−1.3
Two-party-preferred result
Labor	Jessica Stojkovski	11,541	50.7	+14.7
Liberal	Andrea Mitchell	11,234	49.3	−14.7
Labor gain from Liberal		Swing	+14.7	

2013 Western Australian state election: Kingsley
Party	Candidate	Votes	%	±%
Liberal	Andrea Mitchell	13,030	60.0	+12.0
Labor	Brian Corr	6,326	29.1	–6.3
Greens	Diana MacTiernan	1,846	8.5	–2.9
Christians	Sophie Ann Mason	510	2.3	–0.3
Total formal votes		21,712	94.7	−0.3
Informal votes		1,207	5.3	+0.3
Turnout		22,919	5.3	
Two-party-preferred result
Liberal	Andrea Mitchell	14,056	64.8	+10.2
Labor	Brian Corr	7,640	35.2	–10.2
Liberal hold		Swing	+10.2	

=== Elections in the 2000s ===
2008 Western Australian state election: Kingsley
Party	Candidate	Votes	%	±%
Liberal	Andrea Mitchell	9,710	47.7	+10.1
Labor	Judy Hughes	7,230	35.5	−1.2
Greens	Diana MacTiernan	2,289	11.3	+5.3
Christian Democrats	Bronwyn Phipson	571	2.8	−0.2
Family First	Frank Hultgren	545	2.7	+0.3
Total formal votes		20,345	95.1	−0.1
Informal votes		1,052	4.9	+0.1
Turnout		21,397	90.5	
Two-party-preferred result
Liberal	Andrea Mitchell	11,085	54.5	+4.6
Labor	Judy Hughes	9,252	45.5	−4.6
Liberal gain from Labor		Swing	+4.6	

2005 Western Australian state election: Kingsley
Party	Candidate	Votes	%	±%
Labor	Judy Hughes	9,294	37.4	+3.1
Liberal	Colin Edwardes	9,263	37.3	−4.2
Community 1st	Marie Evans	2,859	11.5	+11.5
Greens	Katrina Bercov	1,496	6.0	−0.5
Christian Democrats	Marcus Ward	747	3.0	−0.5
Independent	Trevor Gersch	602	2.4	+2.4
Family First	Mark Patterson	590	2.4	+2.4
Total formal votes		24,851	95.2	−0.5
Informal votes		1,265	4.8	+0.5
Turnout		26,116	93.5	
Two-party-preferred result
Labor	Judy Hughes	12,611	50.8	+3.3
Liberal	Colin Edwardes	12,228	49.2	−3.3
Labor gain from Liberal		Swing	+3.3	

2001 Western Australian state election: Kingsley
Party	Candidate	Votes	%	±%
Liberal	Cheryl Edwardes	9,585	41.9	−12.5
Labor	Jon Davies	7,788	34.0	+1.5
One Nation	Susan Mansell	1,565	6.8	+6.8
Greens	Jemma Tyley	1,426	6.2	+6.2
Democrats	Kerry Lock	865	3.8	−9.4
Christian Democrats	Mike Ewers	831	3.6	+3.6
Liberals for Forests	Pamela Dell	823	3.6	+3.6
Total formal votes		22,883	95.7	+0.4
Informal votes		1,018	4.3	−0.4
Turnout		23,901	93.5	
Two-party-preferred result
Liberal	Cheryl Edwardes	12,027	52.9	−7.3
Labor	Jon Davies	10,710	47.1	+7.3
Liberal hold		Swing	−7.3	

=== Elections in the 1990s ===
1996 Western Australian state election: Kingsley
Party	Candidate	Votes	%	±%
Liberal	Cheryl Edwardes	11,843	54.4	−4.0
Labor	Jon Davies	7,071	32.5	+0.1
Democrats	Bert Toonen	2,866	13.2	+9.0
Total formal votes		21,780	95.4	−1.5
Informal votes		1,058	4.6	+1.5
Turnout		22,838	92.8	
Two-party-preferred result
Liberal	Cheryl Edwardes	13,104	60.2	−2.6
Labor	Jon Davies	8,649	39.8	+2.6
Liberal hold		Swing	−2.6	

1993 Western Australian state election: Kingsley
Party	Candidate	Votes	%	±%
Liberal	Cheryl Edwardes	12,417	58.3	+6.3
Labor	John Elkin	6,889	32.4	−6.5
Greens	Willem Franssen	1,104	5.2	+5.2
Democrats	Warren Bishop	880	4.1	+4.1
Total formal votes		21,290	96.8	+3.0
Informal votes		696	3.2	−3.0
Turnout		21,986	95.8	+2.4
Two-party-preferred result
Liberal	Cheryl Edwardes	13,364	62.8	+5.2
Labor	John Elkin	7,926	37.2	−5.2
Liberal hold		Swing	+5.2	

=== Elections in the 1980s ===
1989 Western Australian state election: Kingsley
Party	Candidate	Votes	%	±%
Liberal	Cheryl Edwardes	8,981	52.0	+9.3
Labor	Mark Nolan	6,706	38.9	−14.4
Grey Power	Francis Butler	925	5.4	+5.4
Independent	Robert Gow	329	1.9	+1.9
Independent	Jack Christensen	322	1.9	+1.9
Total formal votes		17,263	93.8	
Informal votes		1,132	6.2	
Turnout		18,395	93.4	
Two-party-preferred result
Liberal	Cheryl Edwardes	9,944	57.6	+12.9
Labor	Mark Nolan	7,319	42.4	−12.9
Liberal gain from Labor		Swing	+12.9	
