= Electoral results for the district of Mirrabooka =

Western Australian district election results

This is a list of electoral results for the electoral district of Mirrabooka in Western Australian state elections.

== Members for Mirrabooka ==
First incarnation (1968–1974)
Member	Party	Term
Doug Cash	Liberal	1968–1971
Arthur Tonkin	Labor	1971–1974
Second incarnation (2013–present)
Janine Freeman	Labor	2013–2021
Meredith Hammat	Labor	2021–present

== Election results ==
=== Elections in the 2020s ===
2021 Western Australian state election: Mirrabooka
Party	Candidate	Votes	%	±%
Labor	Meredith Hammat	16,173	71.6	+8.9
Liberal	Aaron Sawmadal	2,276	10.1	−11.2
Greens	Mark Cooper	1,333	5.9	−0.5
One Nation	Michael Mabood	939	4.2	+4.2
Christians	Dwight Randall	790	3.5	+0.1
No Mandatory Vaccination	Jessica Ayre	477	2.1	+2.1
Independent	Peter Dunne	257	1.1	+1.1
Independent	Kim Mubarak	200	0.9	−0.5
WAxit	Devinder Chhina	140	0.6	−0.8
Total formal votes		22,585	92.8	+0.7
Informal votes		1,760	7.2	−0.7
Turnout		24,345	81.3	−3.4
Two-party-preferred result
Labor	Meredith Hammat	18,878	83.7	+10.4
Liberal	Aaron Sawmadal	3,676	16.3	−10.4
Labor hold		Swing	+10.4	

=== Elections in the 2010s ===
2017 Western Australian state election: Mirrabooka
Party	Candidate	Votes	%	±%
Labor	Janine Freeman	12,698	59.0	+11.3
Liberal	Lily Chen	5,336	24.8	−14.1
Greens	Rafeif Ismail	1,575	7.3	−1.4
Christians	Chukwudumebi Igbokwe	671	3.1	−1.6
Independent	Kim Mubarak	546	2.5	+2.5
Micro Business	Sareeta Doobree	386	1.8	+1.8
Independent	Matueny Luke	309	1.4	+1.4
Total formal votes		21,521	91.5	+1.4
Informal votes		2,009	8.5	−1.4
Turnout		23,530	84.6	−0.6
Two-party-preferred result
Labor	Janine Freeman	14,879	69.2	+14.6
Liberal	Lily Chen	6,629	30.8	−14.6
Labor hold		Swing	+14.6	

2013 Western Australian state election: Mirrabooka
Party	Candidate	Votes	%	±%
Labor	Janine Freeman	9,661	47.7	−4.2
Liberal	Andrea Creado	7,879	38.9	+8.0
Greens	Mark William Cooper	1,757	8.7	−4.4
Christians	Lois Host	954	4.7	+0.9
Total formal votes		20,251	90.0	
Informal votes		2,239	10.0	
Turnout		22,490	87.5	
Two-party-preferred result
Labor	Janine Freeman	11,045	54.6	−8.4
Liberal	Andrea Creado	9,195	45.4	+8.4
Labor hold		Swing	−8.4	

=== Elections in the 1970s ===
1971 Western Australian state election: Mirrabooka
Party	Candidate	Votes	%	±%
Labor	Arthur Tonkin	8,528	48.1	+2.4
Liberal	Doug Cash	7,293	41.1	−6.6
Democratic Labor	Brian Preston	1,522	8.6	+1.9
Independent	Patricia Giles	378	2.1	+2.1
Total formal votes		17,721	97.3	−0.6
Informal votes		491	2.7	+0.6
Turnout		18,212	93.5	−0.3
Two-party-preferred result
Labor	Arthur Tonkin	9,160	51.7	+4.5
Liberal	Doug Cash	8,561	48.3	−4.5
Labor gain from Liberal		Swing	+4.5	

=== Elections in the 1960s ===
1968 Western Australian state election: Mirrabooka
Party	Candidate	Votes	%	±%
Liberal and Country	Doug Cash	6,035	47.7	
Labor	Kevin Parker	5,779	45.7	
Democratic Labor	John Poole	843	6.7	
Total formal votes		12,657	97.9	
Informal votes		276	2.1	
Turnout		12,933	93.8	
Two-party-preferred result
Liberal and Country	Doug Cash	6,679	52.8	
Labor	Kevin Parker	5,978	47.2	
Liberal and Country hold		Swing		
