= Electoral results for the district of Nollamara =

Western Australian district election results

This is a list of electoral results for the electoral district of Nollamara in Western Australian state elections.

== Members for Nollamara ==
Nollamara (1983–2005)
Member	Party	Term
Keith Wilson	Labor	1983–1989
John Kobelke	Labor	1989–2005
Nollamara (2008–present)
Janine Freeman	Labor	2008–2013

== Election results ==
=== Elections in the 2000s ===
2008 Western Australian state election: Nollamara
Party	Candidate	Votes	%	±%
Labor	Janine Freeman	9,427	51.2	−4.4
Liberal	Trent Charlton-Maughan	5,678	30.8	+7.0
Greens	Glen George	2,459	13.3	+7.9
Christian Democrats	Marty Firth	863	4.7	+1.6
Total formal votes		18,427	92.1	+0.9
Informal votes		1,587	7.9	−0.9
Turnout		20,014	84.9	
Two-party-preferred result
Labor	Janine Freeman	11,552	62.7	−6.5
Liberal	Trent Charlton-Maughan	6,860	37.3	+6.5
Labor hold		Swing	−6.5	

}

2001 Western Australian state election: Nollamara
Party	Candidate	Votes	%	±%
Labor	John Kobelke	11,243	56.1	+2.2
Liberal	Aaron Gray	5,259	26.2	−10.7
One Nation	Keith Anderson	1,506	7.5	+7.5
Greens	Kayt Davies	1,140	5.7	+5.7
Democrats	Paul McCutcheon	581	2.9	−6.3
Independent	Hasan Demirkol	322	1.6	+1.6
Total formal votes		20,051	92.7	+0.2
Informal votes		1,577	7.3	−0.2
Turnout		21,628	90.5	
Two-party-preferred result
Labor	John Kobelke	13,385	67.3	+8.4
Liberal	Aaron Gray	6,512	32.7	−8.4
Labor hold		Swing	+8.4	

=== Elections in the 1990s ===
1996 Western Australian state election: Nollamara
Party	Candidate	Votes	%	±%
Labor	John Kobelke	10,493	53.9	+1.1
Liberal	Brad Waghorn	7,178	36.9	+0.2
Democrats	Sean Roda	1,801	9.2	+8.3
Total formal votes		19,472	92.6	−2.3
Informal votes		1,566	7.4	+2.3
Turnout		21,038	90.3	
Two-party-preferred result
Labor	John Kobelke	11,449	58.9	+0.5
Liberal	Brad Waghorn	7,998	41.1	−0.5
Labor hold		Swing	+0.5	

1993 Western Australian state election: Nollamara
Party	Candidate	Votes	%	±%
Labor	John Kobelke	9,168	49.2	−0.9
Liberal	John Babbage	7,363	39.5	−4.7
Independent	Neil Watson	1,418	7.6	+7.6
Greens	Lucy Honan	697	3.7	+3.7
Total formal votes		18,646	95.3	+6.5
Informal votes		915	4.7	−6.5
Turnout		19,561	93.9	+2.1
Two-party-preferred result
Labor	John Kobelke	10,204	54.7	+1.0
Liberal	John Babbage	8,442	45.3	−1.0
Labor hold		Swing	+1.0	

=== Elections in the 1980s ===
1989 Western Australian state election: Nollamara
Party	Candidate	Votes	%	±%
Labor	John Kobelke	7,930	50.1	−17.4
Liberal	William Stewart	6,994	44.2	+12.9
Democrats	Brian Lobascher	913	5.8	+5.8
Total formal votes		15,837	88.8	
Informal votes		2,003	11.2	
Turnout		17,840	91.8	
Two-party-preferred result
Labor	John Kobelke	8,497	53.7	−14.4
Liberal	William Stewart	7,340	46.3	+14.4
Labor hold		Swing	−14.4	

1986 Western Australian state election: Nollamara
Party	Candidate	Votes	%	±%
Labor	Keith Wilson	9,490	59.9	−1.4
Liberal	Wouterina Klein	6,352	40.1	+1.4
Total formal votes		15,842	97.6	0.0
Informal votes		388	2.4	0.0
Turnout		16,230	93.3	+4.3
Labor hold		Swing	−1.4	

1983 Western Australian state election: Nollamara
Party	Candidate	Votes	%	±%
Labor	Keith Wilson	8,085	61.3	
Liberal	Gregory Wilson	5,107	38.7	
Total formal votes		13,192	97.6	
Informal votes		326	2.4	
Turnout		13,518	89.0	
Labor hold		Swing		
