= Electoral results for the district of Dianella =

Western Australian district election results

This is a list of electoral results for the Electoral district of Dianella in Western Australian state elections.

== Members for Dianella ==
Dianella (1977–1983)
| Member | Party | Term |
|---|---|---|
| Keith Wilson | Labor | 1977–1983 |
Dianella (1989–1996)
| Member | Party | Term |
| Keith Wilson | Labor | 1989–1993 |
| Kim Hames | Liberal | 1993–1996 |

== Election results ==
=== Elections in the 1990s ===
1993 Western Australian state election: Dianella
| Party | Candidate | Votes | % | ±% |
|---|---|---|---|---|
| Liberal | Kim Hames | 8,711 | 46.7 | +2.6 |
| Labor | Keith Wilson | 7,998 | 42.9 | −3.1 |
| Independent | Marguerite Henshaw | 876 | 4.7 | +4.7 |
| Greens | Edwin Speed | 670 | 3.6 | +3.6 |
| Democrats | Stewart Godden | 382 | 2.1 | +2.1 |
| Total formal votes | | 18,637 | 96.0 | +4.2 |
| Informal votes | | 766 | 4.0 | −4.2 |
| Turnout | | 19,403 | 94.2 | +2.4 |
Two-party-preferred result
| Liberal | Kim Hames | 9,572 | 51.4 | +2.5 |
| Labor | Keith Wilson | 9,065 | 48.6 | −2.5 |
| Liberal gain from Labor | | Swing | +2.5 | |

=== Elections in the 1980s ===
1989 Western Australian state election: Dianella
| Party | Candidate | Votes | % | ±% |
|---|---|---|---|---|
| Labor | Keith Wilson | 8,521 | 46.0 | −8.3 |
| Liberal | Terence Tyzack | 8,177 | 44.1 | −1.6 |
| Grey Power | John Greathead | 927 | 5.0 | +5.0 |
| Independent | Allan Jones | 914 | 4.9 | +4.9 |
| Total formal votes | | 18,539 | 91.8 | |
| Informal votes | | 1,650 | 8.2 | |
| Turnout | | 20,189 | 91.8 | |
Two-party-preferred result
| Labor | Keith Wilson | 9,478 | 51.1 | −3.2 |
| Liberal | Terence Tyzack | 9,061 | 48.9 | +3.2 |
| Labor hold | | Swing | −3.2 | |

1980 Western Australian state election: Dianella
| Party | Candidate | Votes | % | ±% |
|---|---|---|---|---|
| Labor | Keith Wilson | 9,943 | 62.2 | +7.9 |
| Liberal | Graham Pittaway | 6,033 | 37.8 | −7.9 |
| Total formal votes | | 15,976 | 96.6 | 0.0 |
| Informal votes | | 561 | 3.4 | 0.0 |
| Turnout | | 16,537 | 89.2 | −2.4 |
| Labor hold | | Swing | +7.9 | |

=== Elections in the 1970s ===
1977 Western Australian state election: Dianella
| Party | Candidate | Votes | % | ±% |
|---|---|---|---|---|
| Labor | Keith Wilson | 8,003 | 54.3 | |
| Liberal | Peter Foeken | 6,735 | 45.7 | |
| Total formal votes | | 14,738 | 96.6 | |
| Informal votes | | 512 | 3.4 | |
| Turnout | | 15,250 | 91.6 | |
| Labor hold | | Swing | −3.7 | |
