= Electoral results for the district of Girrawheen =

Western Australian district election results

This is a list of electoral results for the electoral district of Girrawheen in Western Australian state elections.

== Members for Girrawheen ==
First incarnation (1996–2021)
Ted Cunningham	Labor	1996–2001
Margaret Quirk	Labor	2001–2021
Second incarnation (2025-present)
Meredith Hammat	Labor	2025–present

== Election results ==
=== Elections in the 2020s ===
2025 Western Australian state election: Girrawheen
Party	Candidate	Votes	%	±%
Labor	Meredith Hammat	12,915	52.2	−20.2
Liberal	Jacques Lombard	4,458	18.0	+7.7
Greens	Evan Beasley	2,940	11.9	+6.2
Legalise Cannabis	Nathan Kirk	2,229	9.0	+9.0
Christians	Tracey Purser	1,346	5.4	+2.5
Independent	Kim Mubarak	873	3.5	+2.7
Total formal votes		24,761	92.8	−0.4
Informal votes		1,935	7.2	+0.4
Turnout		26,696	82.8	+3.6
Two-party-preferred result
Labor	Meredith Hammat	17,649	71.3	−12.1
Liberal	Jacques Lombard	7,090	28.7	+12.1
Labor hold		Swing	−12.1	

Results are not final. Last updated on 28 March 2025 at 5:00 PM AWST

=== Elections in the 2010s ===
2017 Western Australian state election: Girrawheen
Party	Candidate	Votes	%	±%
Labor	Margaret Quirk	13,452	56.5	+12.0
Liberal	Dame Krcoski	6,484	27.2	−14.9
Greens	Mushfiq Shah	1,353	5.7	+0.1
Christians	David Phillips	905	3.8	+0.1
Family First	Che Tam Nguyen	662	2.8	−1.3
Shooters, Fishers, Farmers	Raymond Roach	607	2.5	+2.5
Micro Business	Sahaj Singh	356	1.5	+1.5
Total formal votes		23,819	94.5	+2.3
Informal votes		1,375	5.5	−2.3
Turnout		25,194	88.6	+6.0
Two-party-preferred result
Labor	Margaret Quirk	15,883	66.7	+14.0
Liberal	Dame Krcoski	7,927	33.3	−14.0
Labor hold		Swing	+14.0	

2013 Western Australian state election: Girrawheen
Party	Candidate	Votes	%	±%
Labor	Margaret Quirk	9,724	44.1	–3.6
Liberal	John Halligan	9,408	42.6	+5.0
Greens	Saba Kafami	1,289	5.8	–5.9
Family First	Che Tam Nguyen	847	3.8	+3.4
Christians	Mel Davey	801	3.6	+1.9
Total formal votes		22,069	92.4	−0.7
Informal votes		1,824	7.6	+0.7
Turnout		23,893	90.1	
Two-party-preferred result
Labor	Margaret Quirk	11,557	52.4	–4.3
Liberal	John Halligan	10,501	47.6	+4.3
Labor hold		Swing	–4.3	

=== Elections in the 2000s ===
2008 Western Australian state election: Girrawheen
Party	Candidate	Votes	%	±%
Labor	Margaret Quirk	9,155	51.1	+0.8
Liberal	John Halligan	6,109	34.1	+11.5
Greens	Tamara Desiatov	2,658	14.8	+9.3
Total formal votes		17,922	91.9	−1.1
Informal votes		1,587	8.1	+1.1
Turnout		19,509	85.4	
Two-party-preferred result
Labor	Margaret Quirk	11,014	61.5	−7.6
Liberal	John Halligan	6,905	38.5	+7.6
Labor hold		Swing	−7.6	

2005 Western Australian state election: Girrawheen
Party	Candidate	Votes	%	±%
Labor	Margaret Quirk	11,111	52.3	−5.6
Liberal	John Halligan	3,875	18.2	−3.3
Independent	Jon Kelly	3,265	15.4	+15.4
Greens	Tamara Desiatov	984	4.6	−0.6
Family First	George Georgis	880	4.1	+4.1
Christian Democrats	Richard Leeder	623	2.9	+2.9
One Nation	Leon McKenzie	286	1.3	−6.9
Independent	Keith Mynard	227	1.1	−2.5
Total formal votes		21,251	91.5	−1.1
Informal votes		1,963	8.5	+1.1
Turnout		23,214	89.3	
Two-party-preferred result
Labor	Margaret Quirk	15,577	73.4	+2.4
Liberal	John Halligan	5,656	26.6	−2.4
Labor hold		Swing	+2.4	

2001 Western Australian state election: Girrawheen
Party	Candidate	Votes	%	±%
Labor	Margaret Quirk	10,598	54.1	−1.8
Liberal	Isabelle Adams	4,521	23.1	−9.5
One Nation	Andy Nebro	1,637	8.4	+8.4
Greens	Katherine Navarro	1,204	6.2	+6.2
Independent	Keith Mynard	981	5.0	+5.0
Democrats	Jim Kerr	636	3.2	−8.3
Total formal votes		19,577	93.8	+0.6
Informal votes		1,304	6.2	−0.6
Turnout		20,881	90.1	
Two-party-preferred result
Labor	Margaret Quirk	13,197	68.4	+5.8
Liberal	Isabelle Adams	6,086	31.6	−5.8
Labor hold		Swing	+5.8	

=== Elections in the 1990s ===
1996 Western Australian state election: Girrawheen
Party	Candidate	Votes	%	±%
Labor	Ted Cunningham	10,689	55.9	−1.5
Liberal	Avis Gobby	6,240	32.6	+0.9
Democrats	Margaret Evans	2,200	11.5	+10.0
Total formal votes		19,129	93.1	−1.8
Informal votes		1,412	6.9	+1.8
Turnout		20,541	89.2	
Two-party-preferred result
Labor	Ted Cunningham	11,966	62.6	−0.9
Liberal	Avis Gobby	7,143	37.4	+0.9
Labor hold		Swing	−0.9	
