= Electoral district of Nollamara =

Former state electoral district of Western Australia

Nollamara Western Australia—Legislative Assembly
- State: Western Australia
- Dates current: 1983–2005; 2008–2013
- Namesake: Nollamara

Nollamara was an electoral district of the Legislative Assembly in the Australian state of Western Australia.

The district is based in the north-eastern suburbs of Perth. It includes the suburbs of Nollamara, Alexander Heights, Koondoola, Mirrabooka, Westminster and part of the suburb of Dianella.

Politically, Nollamara is a safe Labor seat. Based on the results of the 2005 state election, the electorate was created with a Labor Party majority of 69.3% to 30.7% versus the Liberal Party.

== History ==
The existing seat of Dianella was renamed Nollamara ahead of the 1983 state election, when a redistribution removed most of the suburb of Dianella to the neighbouring seat of Mount Lawley. Labor MP Rev Keith Wilson, member for Dianella since 1977, was successful at the election.

Under the 1988 redistribution effected at the 1989 state election, the seat moved further north and west, taking in the Labor strongholds of Balga, Western Australia, Mirrabooka and Westminster which had previously been in the abolished seat of Balga, while losing the northern part of Morley. Labor candidate John Kobelke won Nollamara, while Wilson successfully contested the new seat of Dianella, which was now centred on Dianella and Yokine.

Nollamara was abolished ahead of the 2005 state election. At its abolition, its territory included the suburbs of Nollamara and Westminster as well as parts of the suburbs of Balcatta, Balga, Dianella, Mirrabooka and Stirling. The district's territory was divided between the existing districts of Girrawheen and Yokine and the new seat of Balcatta. Kobelke subsequently contested and won the seat of Balcatta.

A new seat named Nollamara was created for the 2008 state election when the number of metropolitan seats was increased in accordance with the new one vote one value legislation. The new district was drawn from large parts of the electorates of Balcatta, Girrawheen and Yokine, the latter of which was abolished.

In November 2011, the Boundaries Commission announced that the seat would be abolished as of the 2013 state election. It was essentially replaced by the new seat of Mirrabooka, the name change necessitated by part of the namesake suburb going to the seat of Morley.

== Members for Nollamara ==
Nollamara (1983–2005)
Member	Party	Term
Keith Wilson	Labor	1983–1989
John Kobelke	Labor	1989–2005
Nollamara (2008–2013)
Janine Freeman	Labor	2008–2013

== Election results ==
2008 Western Australian state election: Nollamara
Party	Candidate	Votes	%	±%
Labor	Janine Freeman	9,427	51.2	−4.4
Liberal	Trent Charlton-Maughan	5,678	30.8	+7.0
Greens	Glen George	2,459	13.3	+7.9
Christian Democrats	Marty Firth	863	4.7	+1.6
Total formal votes		18,427	92.1	+0.9
Informal votes		1,587	7.9	−0.9
Turnout		20,014	84.9	
Two-party-preferred result
Labor	Janine Freeman	11,552	62.7	−6.5
Liberal	Trent Charlton-Maughan	6,860	37.3	+6.5
Labor hold		Swing	−6.5	
