= Minister for Aboriginal Affairs (Western Australia) =

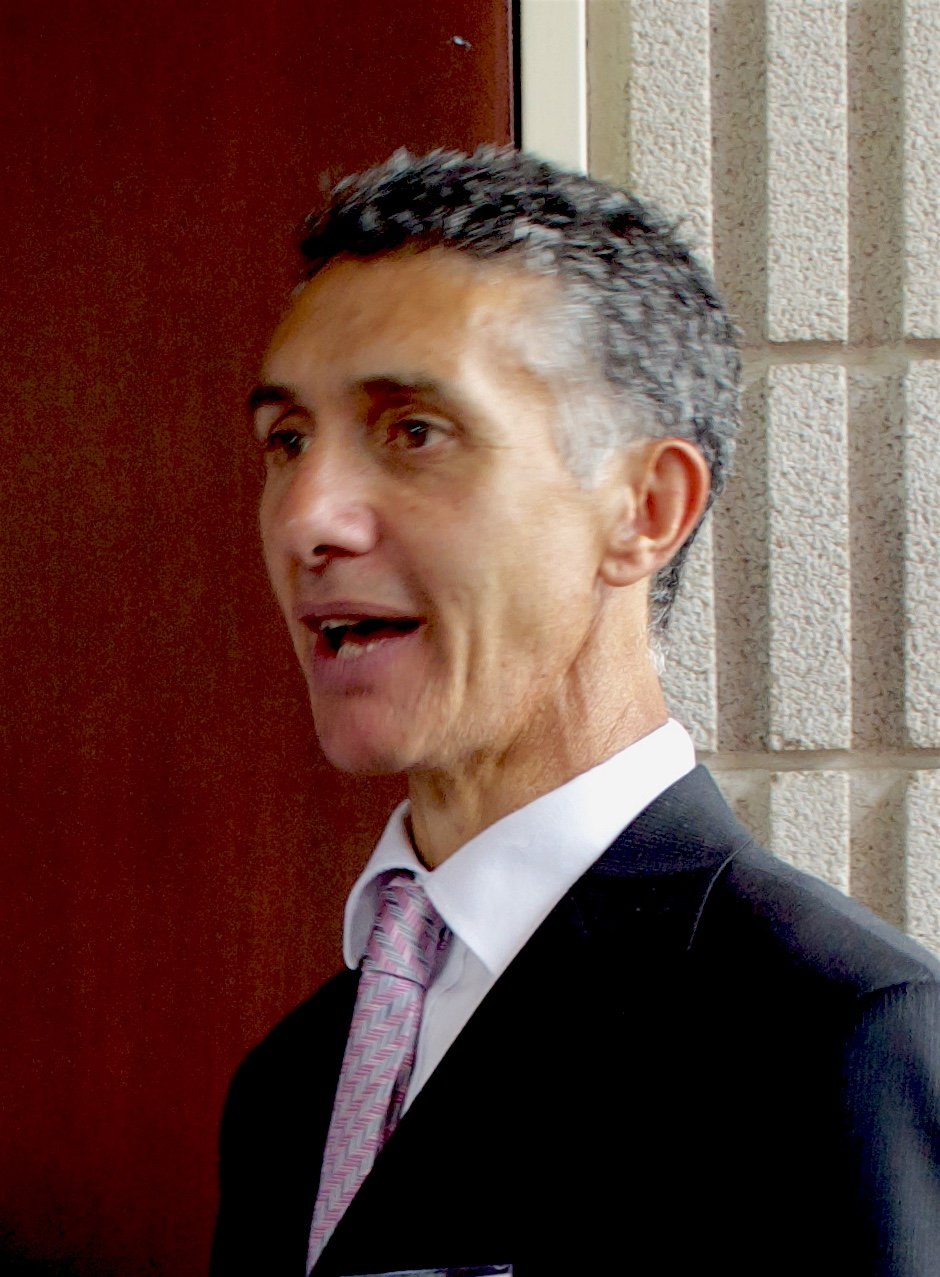
- Incumbent; Tony Buti since 21 December 2021
- Department of Aboriginal Affairs
- Style: The Honourable
- Nominator: Premier of Western Australia
- Appointer: Governor of Western Australia
- Inaugural holder: Ross McDonald (as Minister for Native Affairs)
- Formation: 1 April 1947
- Website: Minister Ben Wyatt MP

The Minister for Aboriginal Affairs is a position in the Cabinet of Western Australia, first created in 1947 during the McLarty–Watts Ministry.

The current Minister for Aboriginal Affairs is Tony Buti of the Labor Party. The minister is responsible for the state government's Department of Aboriginal Affairs (DAA), which exists "to facilitate the development of policy and programs which deliver sustainable economic, environmental and social benefits to Aboriginal communities".

== List of ministers for Aboriginal affairs ==
Twenty one people have been appointed as Minister for Aboriginal Affairs in Western Australia, with Edgar Lewis's 8 years and 325 days during the Brand–Nalder Ministry the longest period in the position. The position and corresponding department have existed under several different names, including Native Affairs (4 years), Native Welfare (19 years), Aboriginal Affairs (23 years), and Indigenous Affairs (12 years). The current name was adopted after requests from representatives of Western Australia's Aboriginal communities.

In the table below, members of the Legislative Council are designated "MLC". All others were members of the Legislative Assembly at the time of their service. In Western Australia, serving ministers are entitled to be styled "The Honourable", and may retain the style after three years' service in the ministry.

Order	Minister	Party	Premier	Title	Term start	Term end	Term in office
1	Ross McDonald	Liberal	McLarty	Minister for Native Affairs	1 April 1947	5 January 1948	2 years, 189 days
1	Ross McDonald	Liberal	McLarty	Minister for Native Welfare	5 January 1948	7 October 1949	2 years, 189 days
2	Hubert Parker MLC	Liberal	McLarty	Minister for Native Affairs	7 October 1949	6 April 1950	181 days
3	Victor Doney	Country	McLarty	Minister for Native Affairs	6 April 1950	23 February 1953	2 years, 323 days
4	Bill Hegney	Labor	Hawke	Minister for Native Welfare	23 February 1953	20 April 1956	3 years, 57 days
5	John Brady	Labor	Hawke	Minister for Native Welfare	20 April 1956	2 April 1959	2 years, 347 days
6	Charles Perkins	Country	Brand	Minister for Native Welfare	2 April 1959	16 November 1961	2 years, 228 days
7	George Cornell	Country	Brand	Minister for Native Welfare	16 November 1961	11 April 1962	146 days
8	Edgar Lewis	Country	Brand	Minister for Native Welfare	12 April 1962	3 March 1971	8 years, 325 days
No minister – portfolio transferred to Minister for Community Welfare (1971–1983).
9	Keith Wilson	Labor	Burke	Minister with special responsibility for Aboriginal Affairs	25 February 1983	26 February 1986	3 years, 150 days
9	Keith Wilson	Labor	Burke	Minister for Aboriginal Affairs	26 February 1986	25 July 1986	3 years, 150 days
10	Ernie Bridge	Labor	Burke	Minister for Aboriginal Affairs	25 July 1986	25 February 1988	2 years, 218 days
10	Ernie Bridge	Labor	Dowding	Minister for Aboriginal Affairs	25 February 1988	28 February 1989	2 years, 218 days
11	Carmen Lawrence	Labor	Dowding	Minister for Aboriginal Affairs	28 February 1989	12 February 1990	1 year, 342 days
11	Carmen Lawrence	Labor	Lawrence	Minister for Aboriginal Affairs	12 February 1990	5 February 1991	1 year, 342 days
12	Judyth Watson	Labor	Lawrence	Minister for Aboriginal Affairs	5 February 1991	16 February 1993	2 years, 11 days
13	Kevin Minson	Liberal	Court	Minister for Aboriginal Affairs	16 February 1993	25 January 1994	343 days
14	Kevin Prince	Liberal	Court	Minister for Aboriginal Affairs	25 January 1994	9 January 1997	2 years, 350 days
15	Kim Hames	Liberal	Court	Minister for Aboriginal Affairs	9 January 1997	16 February 2001	see below
16	Alan Carpenter	Labor	Gallop	Minister for Indigenous Affairs	16 February 2001	27 June 2003	2 years, 131 days
17	John Kobelke	Labor	Gallop	Minister for Indigenous Affairs	27 June 2003	25 January 2006	2 years, 221 days
17	John Kobelke	Labor	Carpenter	Minister for Indigenous Affairs	25 January 2006	3 February 2006	2 years, 221 days
18	Sheila McHale	Labor	Carpenter	Minister for Indigenous Affairs	3 February 2006	2 March 2007	1 year, 27 days
19	Michelle Roberts	Labor	Carpenter	Minister for Indigenous Affairs	2 March 2007	23 September 2008	1 year, 205 days
(15)	Kim Hames	Liberal	Barnett	Minister for Indigenous Affairs	23 September 2008	14 December 2010	6 years, 120 days
20	Peter Collier MLC	Liberal	Barnett	Minister for Indigenous Affairs	14 December 2010	21 March 2013	6 years, 93 days
20	Peter Collier MLC	Liberal	Barnett	Minister for Aboriginal Affairs	21 March 2013	17 March 2017	6 years, 93 days
21	Ben Wyatt	Labor	McGowan	Minister for Aboriginal Affairs	17 March 2017	13 March 2021	3 years, 361 days
22	Stephen Dawson	Labor	McGowan	Minister for Aboriginal Affairs	19 March 2021	21 December 2021	277 days
23	Tony Buti	Labor	McGowan	Minister for Aboriginal Affairs	21 December 2021	8 June 2023	4 years, 335 days
23	Tony Buti	Labor	Cook	Minister for Aboriginal Affairs	8 June 2023	incumbent	4 years, 335 days

== See also ==
- Minister for Aboriginal Affairs (New South Wales)
- Minister for Aboriginal Affairs (Victoria)
- Minister for Indigenous Affairs (Australia)
