= 1987 Morley-Swan state by-election =

By-election in Australia

A by-election for the seat of Morley-Swan in the Legislative Assembly of Western Australia was held on 9 May 1987. It was triggered by the resignation of Arthur Tonkin (the sitting Labor member) on 18 March 1987. The election was won by Labor's Frank Donovan, with the party suffering a small swing against it from the 1986 state election.

== Background ==
Arthur Tonkin, a former schoolteacher, had held Morley-Swan for the Labor Party since the seat's creation at the 1983 state election. He had served in parliament since the 1971 election, and represented Mirrabooka and Morley before transferring to Morley-Swan. Tonkin served as a minister in the government of Brian Burke, but left cabinet in May 1986. He resigned from parliament altogether on 18 March 1987, with the writ for the by-election being issued on 1 April and the close of nominations on 16 April. Polling day was on 9 May, with the writ returned on 18 May.

== Results ==
Morley-Swan state by-election, 1987
Party	Candidate	Votes	%	±%
Labor	Frank Donovan	10,087	56.9	–10.0
Liberal	Kim Hames	6,361	35.8	+2.7
One Australia	Donald Jackson	1,294	7.3	+7.3
Total formal votes		17,742	95.5	–1.2
Informal votes		840	4.5	+1.2
Turnout		18,582	82.1	–10.1
Labor hold		Swing	N/A	

- Preferences were not distributed.

== Aftermath ==
Morley-Swan was abolished at the 1989 state election, where Frank Donovan won the re-created seat of Morley. Donovan left the Labor Party to sit as an independent in October 1991, but did not recontest the seat at the 1993 state election. Kim Hames, his chief opponent at the by-election, ran in the seat of Perth in 1989, but was narrowly defeated by a Labor candidate. He entered parliament at his third attempt, in 1993, and eventually became deputy premier under Colin Barnett from 2008 to 2016.

== See also ==
- List of Western Australian state by-elections
