= Electoral results for the district of Yokine =

Electoral results for the district of Yokine, Western Australia

This is a list of electoral results for the electoral district of Yokine in Western Australian state elections.

== Members for Yokine ==
Member	Party	Term
Kim Hames	Liberal	1996–2001
Bob Kucera	Labor	2001–2008
Bob Kucera	Independent	2008

== Election results ==
=== Elections in the 2000s ===
2005 Western Australian state election: Yokine
Party	Candidate	Votes	%	±%
Labor	Bob Kucera	11,645	49.0	+0.9
Liberal	Dave Vos	8,523	35.8	+1.8
Greens	Heather Aquilina	1,559	6.6	+0.4
Family First	Emily Hopkinson	724	3.0	+3.0
Christian Democrats	Warick Smith	644	2.7	+2.7
Independent	Jean Thornton	471	2.0	+2.0
One Nation	Frank Feher	223	0.9	−0.9
Total formal votes		23,789	93.4	−0.8
Informal votes		1,672	6.6	+0.8
Turnout		25,461	90.5	
Two-party-preferred result
Labor	Bob Kucera	13,846	58.2	−0.6
Liberal	Dave Vos	9,926	41.8	+0.6
Labor hold		Swing	−0.6	

2001 Western Australian state election: Yokine
Party	Candidate	Votes	%	±%
Labor	Bob Kucera	8,593	41.5	+4.3
Liberal	Kim Hames	7,927	38.2	−5.9
Greens	Heather Aquilina	1,759	8.5	+3.2
One Nation	James Ring	810	3.9	+3.9
Democrats	Aaron Hewett	756	3.6	−1.1
Independent	Ron Samuel	597	2.9	+2.9
Seniors Party	Penny Searle	287	1.4	+1.4
Total formal votes		20,729	95.2	+0.3
Informal votes		1,050	4.8	−0.3
Turnout		21,779	89.4	
Two-party-preferred result
Labor	Bob Kucera	11,008	53.4	+6.6
Liberal	Kim Hames	9,595	46.6	−6.6
Labor gain from Liberal		Swing	+6.6	

=== Elections in the 1990s ===
1996 Western Australian state election: Yokine
Party	Candidate	Votes	%	±%
Liberal	Kim Hames	9,127	44.1	−1.0
Labor	Nick Catania	7,698	37.2	−5.7
Independent	Sam Piantadosi	1,116	5.4	+5.4
Greens	Kim Herbert	1,094	5.3	+1.1
Democrats	Margot Clifford	976	4.7	+3.0
Marijuana	Lucy Honan	674	3.3	+3.3
Total formal votes		20,685	94.8	+0.4
Informal votes		1,127	5.2	−0.2
Turnout		21,812	90.3	
Two-party-preferred result
Liberal	Kim Hames	10,987	53.2	+2.6
Labor	Nick Catania	9,663	46.8	−2.6
Liberal hold		Swing	+2.6	
