= Chris Hatton =

Australian politician (born 1957)

Chris Hatton MLA

Member of the Legislative Assembly of Western Australia
- In office 9 March 2013 – 11 March 2017
- Preceded by: John Kobelke
- Succeeded by: David Michael
- Constituency: Balcatta

Personal details
- Born: Christopher David Hatton; 15 April 1957 (age 68) Nedlands, Western Australia, Australia
- Party: Liberal

Christopher David Hatton (born 15 April 1957) is a former Australian politician who was a Liberal Party member of the Legislative Assembly of Western Australia from 2013 to 2017, representing the seat of Balcatta.

Hatton was born in Perth. He worked as a schoolteacher before entering politics, teaching both in the country and at metropolitan schools. Hatton first ran for parliament at the 2008 state election, standing against John Kobelke (the Labor incumbent) in Balcatta. He polled 47.7 percent of the two-party-preferred vote, a positive swing of 6.9 points from the previous election.

Hatton ran again at the 2013 election, at which Kobelke retired. Balcatta had been one of the most marginal seats prior to the election, and fell to the Liberals after a 9.5-point swing in Hatton's favour. He was defeated in 2017.

Western Australian Legislative Assembly
Preceded by John Kobelke	Member for Balcatta; 2013–2017	Succeeded by David Michael
