= Electoral district of Yokine =

Former state electoral district of Western Australia

Yokine Western Australia—Legislative Assembly
- State: Western Australia
- Dates current: 1996–2008
- Namesake: Yokine

Yokine was a Legislative Assembly electorate in the state of Western Australia from 1996 to 2008. It was named for the northern Perth suburb of Yokine which fell within its borders. The last member for Yokine was Bob Kucera who held the seat for the Labor Party by a margin of 8.2%.

The seat was replaced at the 2007 distribution, taking effect at the 2008 election by the new seats of Mount Lawley and Nollamara.

== History ==
The seat was created at the 1994 redistribution, replacing the seat of Dianella and taking in parts of Balcatta. It was first contested at the 1996 election by Dianella Liberal MLA Kim Hames, Balcatta Labor MLA Nick Catania and Upper House Labor MLC Sam Piantadosi. The seat was won by Hames, who served in the Outer Cabinet during Court's second term in office. Labor nominated Bob Kucera, the popular former Assistant Police Commissioner, who won the seat against Hames in the 2001 election on a 7% swing. He won again in 2005, but in the leadup to the 2008 election, he was ruled ineligible to contest the Labor preselection. In June 2008, he resigned from the Labor Party and continued to sit as an independent.

== Geography ==
The electorate was based in Perth's inner northern suburbs and included the suburbs of Yokine and Coolbinia, as well as parts of Balga, Westminster, Mirrabooka, Nollamara, Dianella and Inglewood.

== Members for Yokine ==
Member	Party	Term
Kim Hames	Liberal	1996–2001
Bob Kucera	Labor	2001–2008
Bob Kucera	Independent	2008
