= Electoral district of Mirrabooka =

State electoral district of Western Australia

Mirrabooka Western Australia—Legislative Assembly
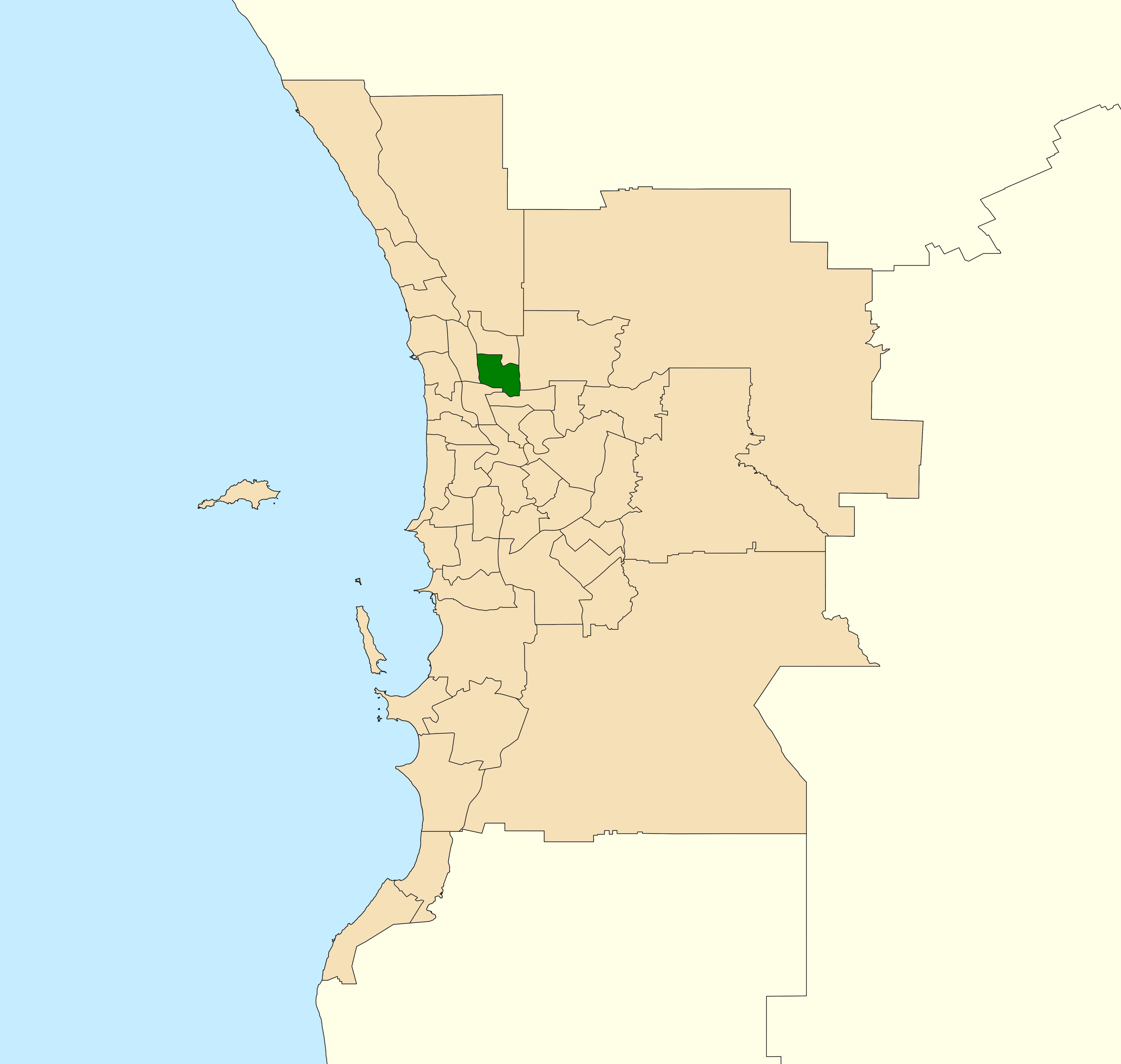
- Interactive map of district boundaries from the 2021 state election to 2025
- State: Western Australia
- Dates current: 1968–1974, 2013–2025
- Namesake: Mirrabooka
- Electors: 29,946 (2021)
- Area: 24 km^{2} (9.3 sq mi)
- Demographic: Metropolitan
Electorates around Mirrabooka:
Kingsley	Landsdale	West Swan
Kingsley	Mirrabooka	West Swan
Balcatta	Balcatta	Morley

Mirrabooka is a former electoral district of the Legislative Assembly in the Australian state of Western Australia.

== Geography ==
The district is based in the northern suburbs of Perth. It includes Alexander Heights, Balga, Koondoola, Mirrabooka, Westminster and parts of Ballajura and Dianella.

== History ==
The district was created for the 2013 state election, essentially as a new name for the district of Nollamara. It was won by sitting Nollamara MP Janine Freeman. Freeman retired from politics at the 2021 state election, and was replaced by Labor's Meredith Hammat. In 2023, Mirrabooka was abolished for the 2025 state election, and was mostly replaced by the new electoral district of Girrawheen.

An earlier incarnation of the district existed from 1968 to 1974. First contested at the 1968 state election, it was won by Doug Cash of the Liberal Party. Cash was defeated one term later by Labor candidate Arthur Tonkin. Mirrabooka was abolished at the 1974 state election, and Tonkin went on to become member for the new seat of Morley.

== Members for Mirrabooka ==
First incarnation (1968–1974)
Member	Party	Term
Doug Cash	Liberal	1968–1971
Arthur Tonkin	Labor	1971–1974
Second incarnation (2013–2025)
Janine Freeman	Labor	2013–2021
Meredith Hammat	Labor	2021–2025

== Election results ==
2021 Western Australian state election: Mirrabooka
Party	Candidate	Votes	%	±%
Labor	Meredith Hammat	16,173	71.6	+8.9
Liberal	Aaron Sawmadal	2,276	10.1	−11.2
Greens	Mark Cooper	1,333	5.9	−0.5
One Nation	Michael Mabood	939	4.2	+4.2
Christians	Dwight Randall	790	3.5	+0.1
No Mandatory Vaccination	Jessica Ayre	477	2.1	+2.1
Independent	Peter Dunne	257	1.1	+1.1
Independent	Kim Mubarak	200	0.9	−0.5
WAxit	Devinder Chhina	140	0.6	−0.8
Total formal votes		22,585	92.8	+0.7
Informal votes		1,760	7.2	−0.7
Turnout		24,345	81.3	−3.4
Two-party-preferred result
Labor	Meredith Hammat	18,878	83.7	+10.4
Liberal	Aaron Sawmadal	3,676	16.3	−10.4
Labor hold		Swing	+10.4	
