= Kim Hames =

Australian politician (born 1953)

The Honourable Kim Hames AM, JP
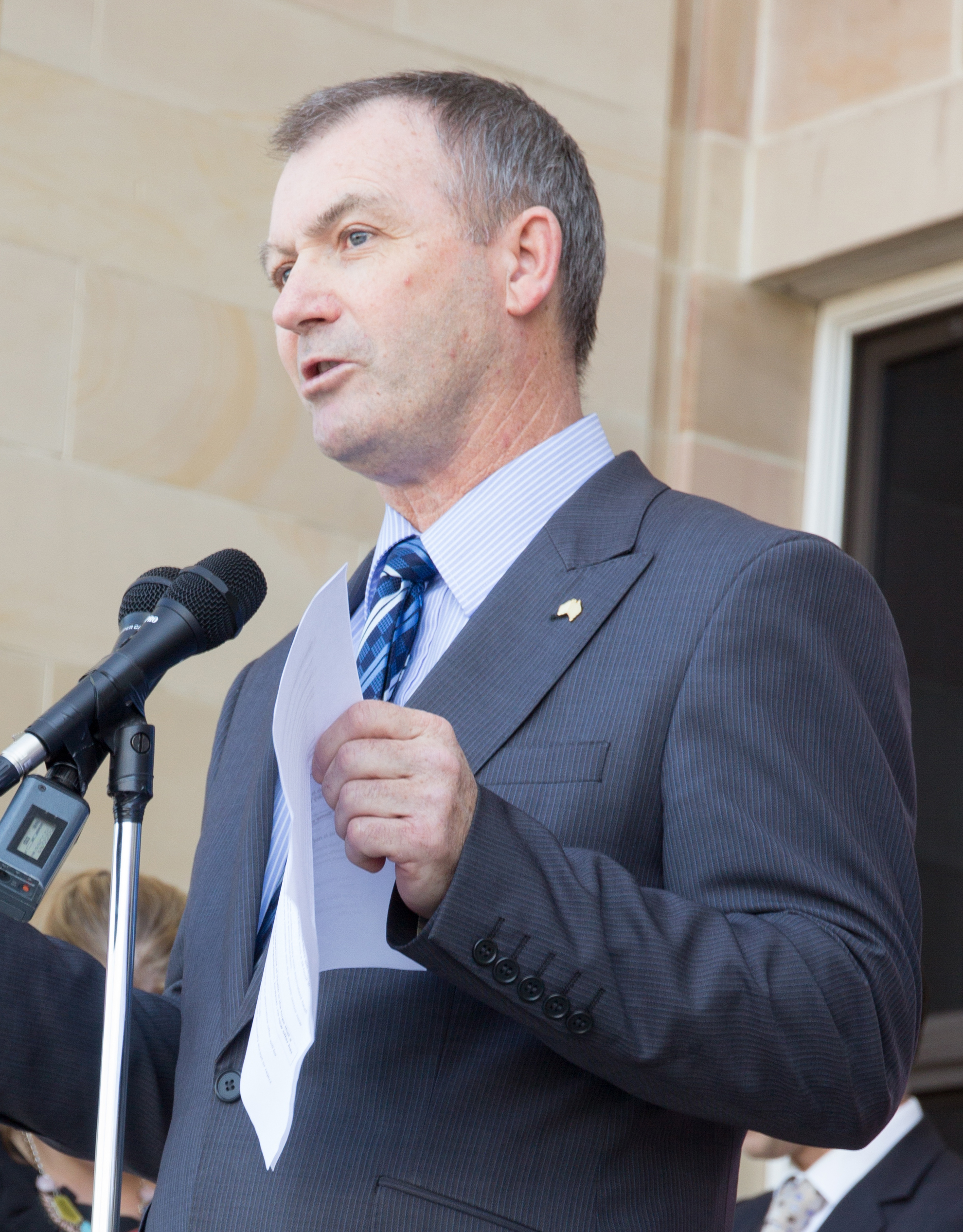
- Hames in October 2012

Deputy Premier of Western Australia
- In office 23 September 2008 – 16 February 2016
- Premier: Colin Barnett
- Preceded by: Eric Ripper
- Succeeded by: Liza Harvey

Member of the Legislative Assembly of Western Australia
- In office 26 February 2005 – 30 January 2017
- Preceded by: Arthur Marshall
- Succeeded by: Zak Kirkup
- Constituency: Dawesville
- In office 6 February 1993 – 14 December 1996
- Preceded by: Keith Wilson
- Succeeded by: None (abolished)
- Constituency: Dianella
- In office 14 December 1996 – 10 February 2001
- Preceded by: None (new seat)
- Succeeded by: Bob Kucera
- Constituency: Yokine

Personal details
- Born: Kim Desmond Hames; 24 March 1953 (age 73) Subiaco, Western Australia
- Party: Liberal
- Education: University of Western Australia

Kim Desmond Hames (born 24 March 1953) is an Australian politician who was a Liberal Party member of the Legislative Assembly of Western Australia from 1993 to 2001 and from 2005 to 2017. He served as a minister in the governments of Richard Court and Colin Barnett, and was deputy premier to Barnett from 2008 to 2016. Hames retired from parliament at the 2017 state election.

== Early life ==
Hames was born in Perth to Eunice (née Jackson) and Reginald Hames. He attended Guildford Grammar School before going on to the University of Western Australia to study medicine. After graduation, he worked as a general practitioner, which had also been his father's profession. Hames was elected to the Bayswater City Council in 1985, and served as a councillor until his election to parliament in 1993.

== Politics ==
Hames first stood for parliament at the 1987 by-election for the seat of Morley-Swan, but was defeated by the Labor candidate, Frank Donovan. At the 1989 state election, he contested the seat of Perth, but lost by a narrow margin to Labor's Ian Alexander. Hames was successful in his third attempt to enter parliament, winning the seat of Dianella from Labor's Keith Wilson at the 1993 election. He transferred to the new seat of Yokine at the 1996 election, after Dianella was abolished in a redistribution. Hames was elevated to the ministry in January 1997, becoming Minister for Housing, Minister for Aboriginal Affairs, and Minister for Water Resources in the government of Richard Court. During his time as minister responsible for the Department of Aboriginal Affairs, he was involved in the repatriation from England of the head of Yagan, a 19th-century Noongar warrior. Hames remained in the ministry until the 2001 state election, when he was defeated in his own seat by Labor's Bob Kucera. The Court government was also defeated.

At the 2005 state election, Hames was re-elected to parliament as the member for the seat of Dawesville (taking in the southern suburbs of Mandurah). He replaced the retiring Liberal member, Arthur Marshall. Hames was included in the shadow cabinet immediately after the election, and went on to serve under four leaders of the opposition (Matt Birney, Paul Omodei, Troy Buswell, and Colin Barnett). He was elected deputy leader of the Liberal Party in January 2008, when Buswell became leader, and retained the deputy leadership when Buswell was replaced by Barnett later in the year. The Liberal Party formed government after the 2008 state election, with Hames becoming Deputy Premier, Minister for Health, and Minister for Indigenous Affairs (for a second time) (Note: The position now known as Minister for Aboriginal Affairs was known as Minister for Indigenous Affairs between 2001 and 2013.) in the new ministry. In December 2010, he was also appointed Minister for Tourism. However, Hames resigned as tourism minister in July 2013, after being accused of abusing an accommodation entitlement. Later in the year, in December 2013, he replaced Terry Redman as Minister for Training and Workforce Development. He eventually reclaimed his previous tourism portfolio in a December 2014 reshuffle, with Liza Harvey taking on the training portfolio.

In December 2015, Hames announced his intention to resign as deputy leader of the Liberal Party (and thus also as deputy premier) with effect from February 2016. Liza Harvey was elected unopposed as his successor. Hames's term of seven years and almost five months as deputy premier is the most by any member of the Liberal Party, and he was the first Liberal since Cyril Rushton in 1983 to hold the position. (Note: In the government of Richard Court, the only Liberal government between 1983 and 2008, the position of deputy premier was held by Hendy Cowan, a member of the National Party.) He remained in cabinet until a reshuffle in March 2016. Hames retired from parliament at the 2017 state election, with Zak Kirkup succeeding him as member for Dawesville.

== Notes ==
Parliament of Western Australia
Preceded by Keith Wilson	Member for Dianella; 1993–1996	Abolished
New seat	Member for Yokine; 1996–2001	Succeeded by Bob Kucera
Preceded by Arthur Marshall	Member for Dawesville; 2005–2017	Succeeded by Zak Kirkup
Political offices
Preceded by Eric Ripper	Deputy Premier; 2008–2016	Succeeded by Liza Harvey
Preceded by Graham Kierath	Minister for Housing; 1997–2001	Succeeded by Tom Stephens
Preceded by Kevin Prince; Michelle Roberts	Minister for Aboriginal Affairs; 1997–2001; 2008–2010	Succeeded by Alan Carpenter; Peter Collier
Preceded by Roger Nicholls	Minister for Water Resources; 1997–2001	Succeeded by Judy Edwards
Preceded by Jim McGinty	Minister for Health; 2008–2016	Succeeded by John Day
Preceded by Liz Constable; Liza Harvey	Minister for Tourism; 2010–2013; 2014–2016	Succeeded by Colin Barnett; Colin Barnett
Preceded by Terry Redman	Minister for Training and Workforce Development; 2013–2014	Succeeded by Liza Harvey
