= Nollamara =

- Suburb
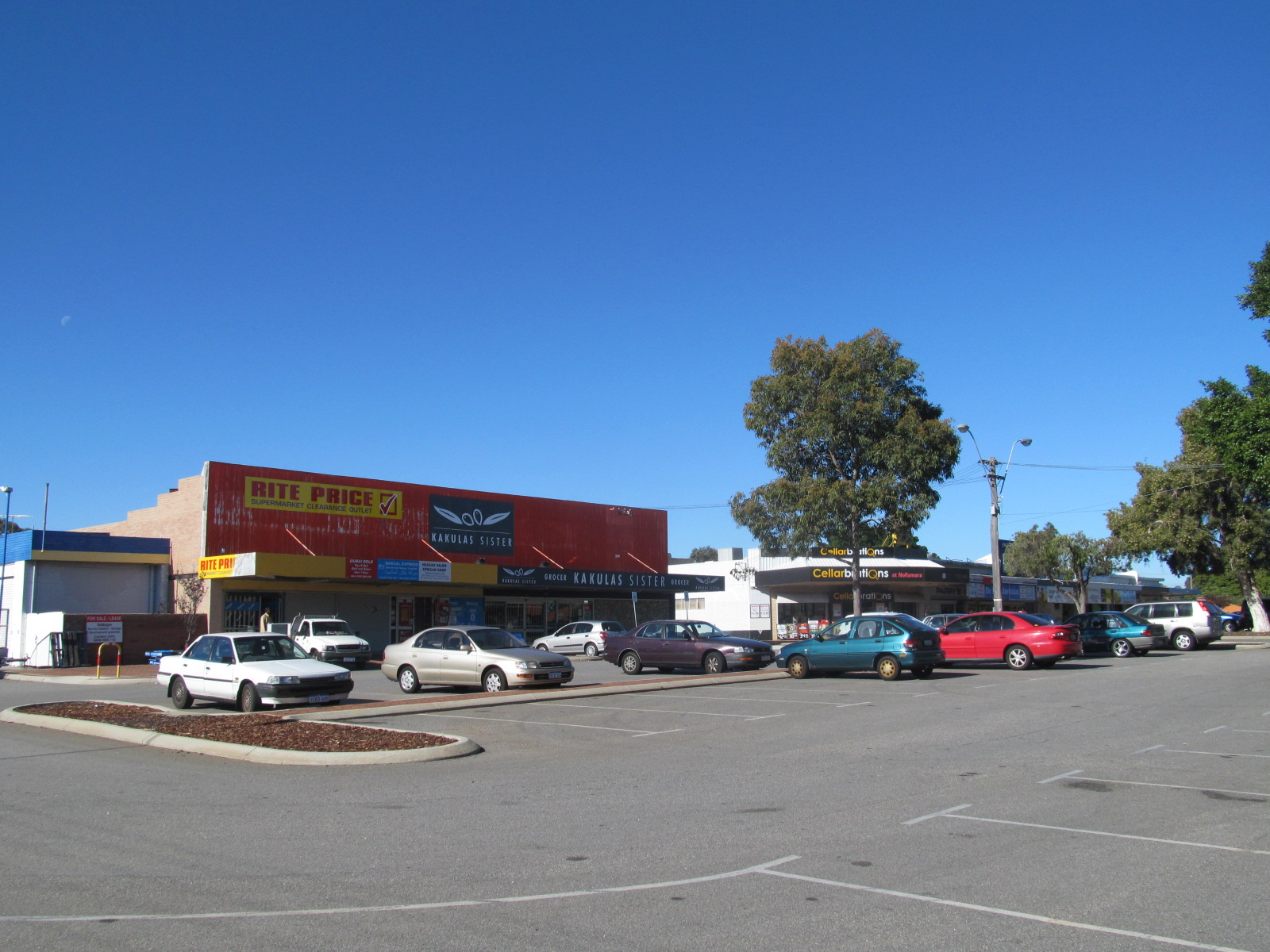
- Nollamara Shopping Centre in 2012
- Interactive map of Nollamara
- Coordinates: 31.882°S 115.846°E
- Country: Australia
- State: Western Australia
- City: Perth
- LGA: City of Stirling
- Location: 10 km (6.2 mi) N of Perth CBD

Government
  - State electorate: Morley
  - Federal division: Cowan

Area
  - Total: 3.7 km^{2} (1.4 sq mi)

Population
  - Total: 12,779 (SAL 2021)
- Postcode: 6061
Suburbs around Nollamara
Balcatta	Westminster	Mirrabooka
Balcatta	Nollamara	Dianella
Tuart Hill	Yokine	Dianella

Nollamara is a suburb of Perth, Western Australia. Its local government area is the City of Stirling.

The name "Nollamara" is a Noongar word for the flowering plant Macropidia, commonly known as the black kangaroo paw.

The suburb is less than 10 km (6.2 mi) away from the Perth central business district and is approximately 11 km (6.8 mi) from Trigg beach. Previously known as a lower income area, Nollamara has gone through a period of gentrification over the past decade that continues to this day. Older homes are being replaced with new townhomes and there has been a surge in young families and professionals populating the suburb. The area is characterized by extensive trees, parks and recreational facilities. The newly renovated Des Penman Reserve is a good example of this as it includes tennis, soccer, lawn-bowls, playground, shaded lunch areas and BBQ facilities. Parts of Nollamara are elevated, providing views of surrounding neighbourhoods.

Nollamara borders prominent areas such as Yokine and Dianella that are host to multimillion-dollar homes. A newly developed Flinders Street and Wanneroo Road provide easy access to Leederville, Subiaco, Northbridge and the Perth CBD.

== Transport ==
The suburb is served by a number of Transperth bus routes operated by Swan Transit and Path Transit. The 371 (Mirrabooka-Yokine) covers Nollamara Shopping Centre and Flinders Street. The 384 (Mirrabooka-Perth) covers the Nollamara Shopping Centre and Wanneroo Road. The 970X and 970 (Landsdale-Perth) covers Flinders Street and inner portions of the suburb, the 389 (Wanneroo-Perth) and the 386/386X (Marangaroo-Perth) covers Wanneroo Road south to Perth, the 371 (Warwick-Bayswater) and 415 (Stirling-Mirrabooka) covers Ravenswood Drive in the north.

- 371 Mirrabooka Bus Station to Flinders Square – serves Ravenswood Drive, Flinders Street, Ilumba Road, Carcoola Street, Sylvia Street, Hillsborough Drive and Nollamara Avenue
- 970X Landsdale to Perth Busport (limited stops) – serves Mirrabooka Avenue, Nollamara Avenue, Flinders Street and Mirrabooka Bus Station
- 975 Warwick Station to Bayswater Station – serves Ravenswood Drive
- 375 Mirrabooka Bus Station to Alexander Heights Shopping Centre – serves Ravenswood Drive
- 384 Mirrabooka Bus Station to Perth Busport – serves Ravenswood Drive, Flinders Street, Ilumba Road, Carcoola Street, Sylvia Street, Hillsborough Drive, Nollamara Avenue and Wanneroo Road
- 386X Perth Busport to Kingsway City (limited stops) – serves Wanneroo Road and Amelia Street
- 386 Perth Busport to Kingsway City – serves Wanneroo Road and Amelia Street
- 388 Perth Busport to Warwick Station – serve Wanneroo Road
- 389 Perth Busport to Wanneroo – serves Wanneroo Road
- 415 Mirrabooka Bus Station to Stirling Station – serves Ravenswood Drive and Amelia Street
- 970 Landsdale to Perth Busport (high frequency) – serves Mirrabooka Avenue, Nollamara Avenue and Flinders Street
- 998 Fremantle Station to Fremantle Station (limited stops) – CircleRoute Clockwise, serves Morley Drive
- 999 Fremantle Station to Fremantle Station (limited stops) – CircleRoute Anti-Clockwise, serves Morley Drive

== Facilities ==
- Quan The Am Nunnery, a Vietnamese Buddhist temple is located in the suburb.
- Dhammaloka City centre, a Bhuddist temple in the tradition of Ajahn Chah, is located there as well.
