= Cheryl Edwardes =

Australian politician

The Honourable Cheryl Edwardes AO

Member of the Western Australian Legislative Assembly for Kingsley
- In office 4 February 1989 – 26 February 2005
- Preceded by: District created
- Succeeded by: Judy Hughes

Personal details
- Born: Cheryl Lynn Duschka; 1 March 1950 (age 76) Mount Hawthorn, Western Australia
- Party: Liberal Party
- Spouse(s): Vance Bond; Colin Edwardes
- Children: Two
- Education: University of Western Australia
- Profession: Barrister and solicitor

Cheryl Lynn Edwardes AO (née Duschka; born 1 March 1950) is a former Australian politician.

She was born at Mount Hawthorn in Perth, Western Australia and was a barrister and solicitor before entering politics. In 1989 she was elected to the Western Australian Legislative Assembly as the Liberal member for Kingsley. She was immediately promoted to the front bench as Shadow Minister for Education, and remained a senior frontbencher for the rest of her career, including serving as Attorney-General from 1993 to 1995, Family and Services Minister from 1995 to 1997, and Environment Minister from 1997 to 2001. She remained on the front bench in Opposition as Shadow Minister for Planning, Labour Relations and Employment, Public Sector Management and Censorship, and was Manager of Opposition Business from 2004 until her retirement from politics in 2005.

During her time as Attorney-General she was embroiled in a corruption scandal involving Wayne Bradshaw, the mayor of Wanneroo Council and brother of her Liberal parliamentary colleague John Bradshaw.

A Royal Commission however subsequently cleared her of any wrongdoing.

Edwardes was appointed as a Member of the Order of Australia (AM) in the 2016 Queen's Birthday Honours. She was promoted to Officer of the Order of Australia (AO) in the 2025 Australia Day Honours.

Western Australian Legislative Assembly
New seat	Member for Kingsley; 1989–2005	Succeeded by Judy Hughes
