= Doug Cash =

Australian Federal and State (WA) politician (1919–2002)

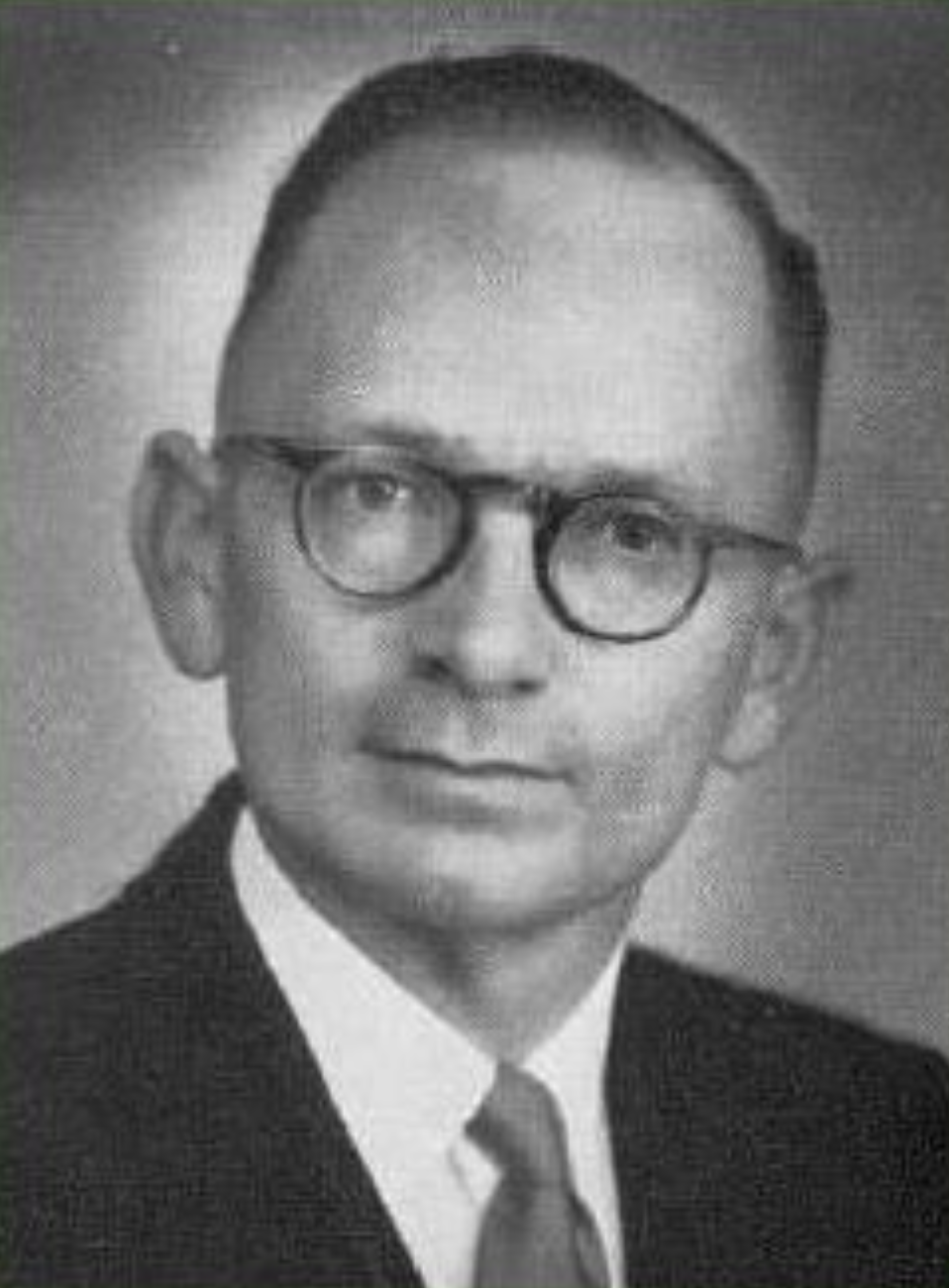

Member of the Australian Parliament for Stirling
- In office 22 November 1958 – 9 December 1961
- Preceded by: Harry Webb
- Succeeded by: Harry Webb

Member of the Western Australian Parliament for Mirrabooka
- In office 23 March 1968 – 20 February 1971
- Preceded by: New seat
- Succeeded by: Arthur Tonkin

Personal details
- Born: 15 July 1919 Gladstone, Manitoba, Canada
- Died: 15 February 2002 (aged 82) Joondalup, Western Australia, Australia
- Party: Liberal
- Spouse: Margaret Moore (m. 1946)
- Education: Western Australian Institute of Technology
- Occupation: Public servant Newsagent; Librarian

Earl Douglas Cash (15 July 1919 – 15 February 2002) was an Australian politician. He was a member of the Liberal Party and served in the House of Representatives from 1958 to 1961, representing the Western Australian seat of Stirling. He was defeated after a single term but later served in the Western Australian Legislative Assembly from 1968 to 1971, representing the seat of Mirrabooka.

== Early life ==
Cash was born on 15 July 1919 in Gladstone, Manitoba, Canada. He was the son of Sarah Cecile Elizabeth (née Dean) and Walter Gurnet Cash. His father was born in Iowa and moved to Canada as a child, working on the Canadian Pacific Railway and later as a hotel proprietor and storekeeper. His mother was born in Blackburn, England, and immigrated to Canada as a young woman.

Cash spent his early years in Deloraine, Manitoba. The family moved to Vancouver in 1922 and immigrated to Australia later that year aboard RMS Niagara. During the 1920s the family lived for periods in New South Wales, South Australia and Victoria. They eventually settled in Western Australia in 1930, initially in South Fremantle and later in Victoria Park. Cash attended Perth Boys' School from 1931 to 1933 and went on to Perth Technical College. He joined the Postmaster-General's Department in 1934 and worked for periods in Perth and on the Eastern Goldfields at Coolgardie, Norseman and Kalgoorlie. He joined the Amalgamated Postal Workers Union in 1937.

=== Military service ===
In August 1940, Cash enlisted with the Citizen Military Forces and was assigned to the 28th Battalion. He transferred to the Royal Australian Air Force (RAAF) in January 1941 and served as a stores and accounts clerk. He spent a year at the No. 4 Service Flying Training School RAAF in Geraldton and then joined No. 14 Squadron RAAF at RAAF Pearce. Cash was promoted to sergeant in June 1942 and to flight sergeant in December 1944. He served on the New Guinea campaign in 1945 at Madang and the Admiralty Islands, before being discharged from the military in April 1946. After the war's end he returned to Perth where he ran a newsagency. He remained in the RAAF Reserve until 1955.

== Politics ==
Cash joined the Liberal and Country League of Western Australia in 1950 and was an officeholder in the party's Belmont and Yokine branches.

Cash was elected to the House of Representatives at the 1958 federal election, narrowly defeating the incumbent Australian Labor Party MP Harry Webb in the seat of Stirling. He lost the seat after a single term, with Webb reclaiming Stirling for the ALP at the 1961 election. He recontested Stirling at the 1963 and 1966 elections without success. He briefly withdrew from the campaign in 1966 following a conflict with the Liberal state executive over his university studies. He graduated Bachelor of Arts from the Western Australian Institute of Technology in the same year, having majored in politics.

At the 1968 Western Australian state election, Cash was elected to the Western Australian Legislative Assembly seat of Mirrabooka, a new seat. He was again defeated after a single term, losing to ALP candidate Arthur Tonkin at the 1971 state election.

== Later activities ==
Cash worked as a research officer for the Liberal Party from 1971 to 1974. He completed a graduate diploma in library studies through the Library Association of Australia and moved to Darwin in 1976. He was the special collections librarian at Darwin Community College until 1978 and then worked as librarian for the Northern Territory Department of Law until his retirement in 1982.

== Personal life ==
In 1946, Cash married Margaret Moore (née McKenzie), with whom he had two daughters. He retired to Perth and died at Joondalup Health Campus on 15 February 2002, aged 82.

Parliament of Australia
Preceded by Harry Webb	Member for Stirling; 1958 – 1961	Succeeded by Harry Webb
