= Frank Donovan (politician) =

Australian politician

Member of the Legislative Assembly of Western Australia
- In office 9 May 1987 – 4 February 1989
- Preceded by: Arthur Tonkin
- Succeeded by: None (seat abolished)
- Constituency: Morley-Swan
- In office 4 February 1989 – 6 February 1993
- Preceded by: None (new seat)
- Succeeded by: Clive Brown
- Constituency: Morley

Personal details
- Born: 28 January 1947 (age 79) Rickmansworth, Hertfordshire, England
- Party: Labor (to 1991)
- Other political affiliations: Independent (from 1991)

Francis Anthony Donovan (born 28 January 1947) is a former Australian politician who was a member of the Legislative Assembly of Western Australia from 1987 to 1993. A Vietnam veteran, Donovan worked as a social worker before entering politics. He was a member of the Labor Party until 1991, when he resigned to sit as an independent.

== Early life ==
Donovan was born in Rickmansworth, Hertfordshire, England, to Cecelia Mary (née Fletcher) and James Francis Donovan. In 1964, after leaving school, he moved to Australia and enlisted in the Australian Army. He served a tour of duty with the 5th Battalion, Royal Australian Regiment during the Vietnam War, and on his return was posted to the Balmoral Naval Hospital in Sydney as a welfare officer. Donovan left the army in 1969, and moved to Western Australia the following year. After a few years as a self-employed cabinet-maker, he moved to Roebourne (a small town in the Pilbara), where he was employed as a welfare officer by the state government. In 1977, Donovan began studying at the Western Australian Institute of Technology (WAIT), graduating with a Bachelor of Social Work in 1980. He subsequently worked as a researcher for Graeme Campbell, a federal Labor MP, and then as a social worker. He was also involved in the formation of a statewide association for Vietnam veterans.

== Politics ==
Donovan first stood for parliament at the 1983 state election, but lost to Peter Coyne (the sitting Liberal member) in the seat of Murchison-Eyre. Four years later, he won the 1987 Morley-Swan by-election, which had been caused by the resignation of Arthur Tonkin (a former Labor minister). Donovan was re-elected at the 1989 state election, winning the renamed seat of Morley. He was subsequently made deputy chairman of committees in the Legislative Assembly, holding the position until October 1991, when he resigned from the Labor Party to sit as an independent. Donovan had been a prominent opponent of the federal Labor government's decision to send troops to the Gulf War, although the "last straw" for him before his resignation from the party was the state Labor government's decision to grant land to the fledgling University of Notre Dame Australia, a private Catholic university in Fremantle. He was the third Labor MP to leave the party in 1991, along with Pam Buchanan and Ian Alexander, and their combined resignations meant the Labor Party (led by Carmen Lawrence) was reduced to a minority government. Donovan did not re-contest his seat at the 1993 state election, and subsequently returned to social work. He moved to Victoria in 1995.

== See also ==
- Members of the Western Australian Legislative Assembly

Parliament of Western Australia
Preceded by Arthur Tonkin	Member for Morley-Swan; 1987–1989	Abolished
New seat	Member for Morley; 1989–1993	Succeeded by Clive Brown
