= Electoral district of Dianella =

Former electoral district of Western Australia

Dianella Western Australia—Legislative Assembly
- State: Western Australia
- Dates current: 1977–1983; 1989–1996
- Namesake: Dianella

Dianella was an electoral district of the Legislative Assembly in the Australian state of Western Australia from 1977 to 1983 and again from 1989 to 1996.

The district was based in the northern suburbs of Perth.

== History ==
Dianella was first contested at the 1977 state election. The seat was won by Labor candidate Rev Keith Wilson, who became the first clergyman to win Parliamentary office since changes to the electoral laws a few years earlier which lifted a ban on them. The seat was renamed Nollamara two terms later, ahead of the 1983 state election.

Dianella was created as a new seat further south from its original incarnation for the 1989 state election, with Wilson successfully transferring to the seat, serving also as Minister for Health under Premiers Peter Dowding and Carmen Lawrence. He was defeated one term later at the 1993 state election by Liberal candidate Kim Hames. The seat was abolished ahead of 1996 state election and split between the seats of Maylands and Ballajura, with the suburb of Yokine in the electorate's west being transferred to the new seat of Yokine. The final member, Kim Hames, contested and won the latter.

== Members for Dianella ==
Dianella (1977–1983)
Member	Party	Term
Keith Wilson	Labor	1977–1983
Dianella (1989–1996)
Member	Party	Term
Keith Wilson	Labor	1989–1993
Kim Hames	Liberal	1993–1996
