= Jessica Stojkovski =

Australian politician (born 1981)

Jessica Stojkovski MLA

Member of the Western Australian Legislative Assembly for Kingsley
- Incumbent
- Assumed office 11 March 2017
- Preceded by: Andrea Mitchell

Personal details
- Born: Jessica Mary Christine O'Gorman; 18 October 1981 (age 44) Perth, Western Australia, Australia
- Party: Labor
- Parent: Tony O'Gorman
- Education: Sacred Heart College; Edith Cowan University
- Occupation: Town planner (City of Wanneroo Council)
- Profession: Public servant Politician
- Website: www.jessicastojkovski.com.au

Jessica Mary Christine Stojkovski (née O'Gorman, born 18 October 1981) is an Australian politician. She has been a Labor member of the Western Australian Legislative Assembly since the 2017 state election, representing Kingsley, which takes in the areas of Kingsley, Woodvale, Greenwood, Hamersley and Warwick.

== Personal life ==
Stojkovski is the daughter of former Labor MP Tony O'Gorman, who previously represented Joondalup in the State Parliament from 2001 to 2013. Jessica Stojkovski worked as a town planner before entering politics. She also served as president of the Landsdale Residents Association as well as on the boards of numerous primary schools. Stojkovski is a sponsor of 10 local sporting clubs.

Jessica Stojkovski lives in Woodvale with her husband Siljan and two children. She grew up in Beldon and Joondalup, where she attended Eddystone Primary School and Sacred Heart College.

== Political career ==
Jessica Stojkovski won the seat of Kingsley for the Labor Party in 2017, with a two-party preferred vote of 50.7%, making it the first time the centre-right Liberal Party had lost the seat in 12 years.

As the Member for Kingsley, Stojkovski advocated for the widening of the Mitchell Freeway from Hodges Street to Hepburn Avenue, and managed to save Duffy House. Stojkovski has supported investment in the Joondalup Health Campus, the Osborne Park Hospital and the East Green Development. In 2020, she presented a petition from local residents in Greenwood to the Transport Minister calling for the construction of an amenity wall along the Mitchell Freeway between Hepburn Avenue and Warwick Road in order to reduce noise pollution from the freeway.

In June 2018, political opponents accused Stojkovski of misusing public funds to print and disseminate flyers promoting the candidacy of her father in the 2019 federal election for the seat of Moore, which overlaps with the state electorate of Kingsley. However, Stojkovski claimed that all expenses would be paid "out of her own money" and no public expenditure had been utilised.

Stojkovski won reelection in the March 2021 state election, with a 60.5% primary vote and 66.9% two-party preferred vote. Stojkovski's candidature marked the highest vote for the Labor Party in the history of the seat of Kingsley. Since being re-elected in 2021, Jessica has continued to advocate for the community whilst being appointed Parliamentary Secretary to the Honorable Rita Saffioti, Minister for Transport; Planning; Ports between 19 March 2021 to 14 December 2022, additionally Parliamentary Secretary to the Honorable John Carey; Minister for Housing; Lands; Homelessness; Local Government from 14 December 2022 to 8 June 2023.

Following the resignation of former premier Mark McGowan, Jessica was made Parliamentary Secretary to the Premier; Minister for State and Industry Development, Jobs and Trade; Public Sector Management; Federal-State Relations; Parliamentary Secretary of the Cabinet from 8 June 2023 in the new Cook Government ministry.

Stojkovski was re-elected in the 2025 Western Australian state election.

Western Australian Legislative Assembly
Preceded by Andrea Mitchell	Member for Kingsley; 2017–present	Incumbent
