= Andrea Mitchell (politician) =

Australian politician (1956–2020)

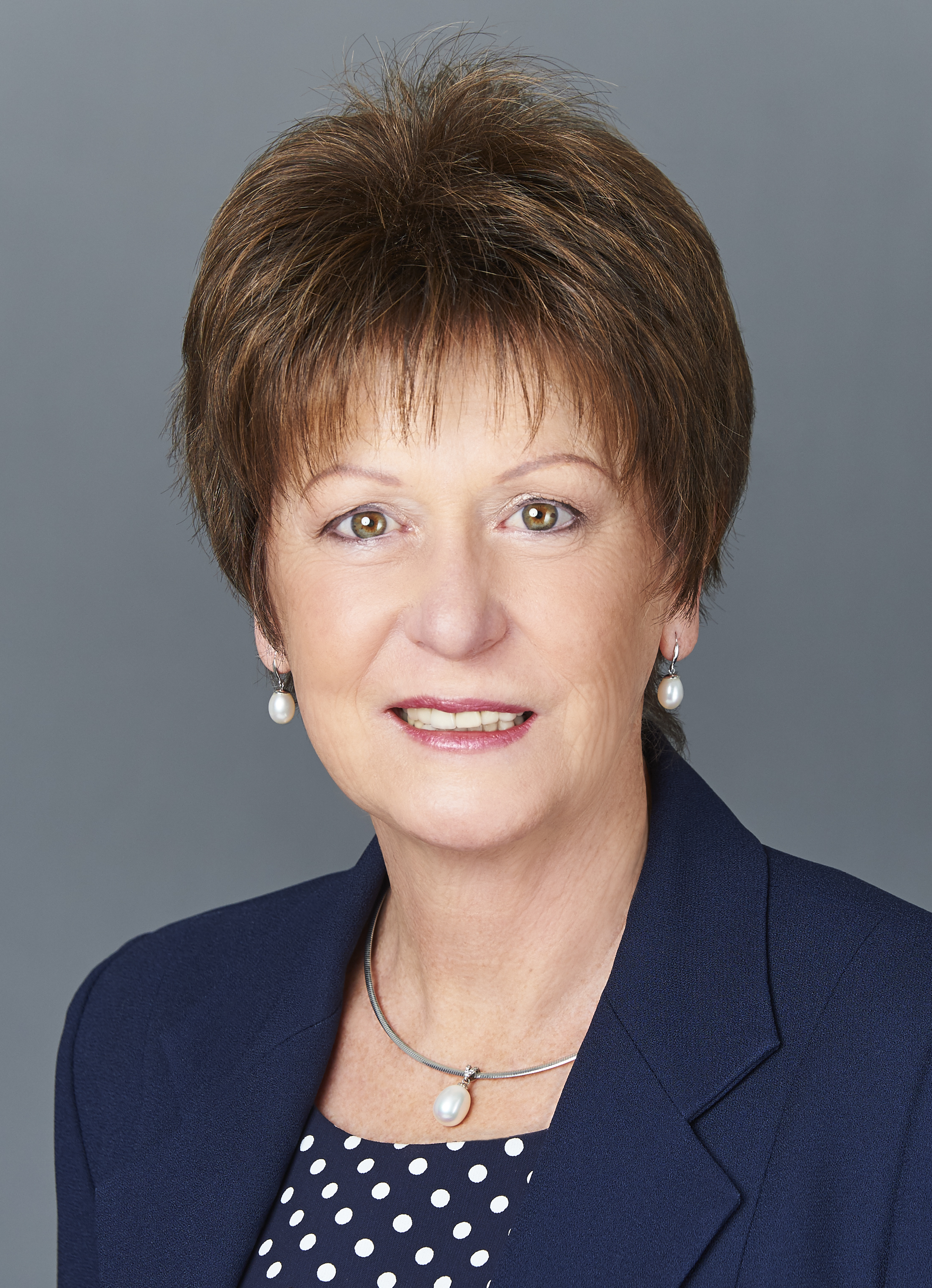

Member of the Western Australian Legislative Assembly for Kingsley
- In office 6 September 2008 – 11 March 2017
- Preceded by: Judy Hughes
- Succeeded by: Jessica Stojkovski

Personal details
- Born: Andrea Ruth Mitchell; 27 February 1956 Brisbane, Queensland, Australia
- Died: 4 April 2020 (aged 64) Western Australia
- Party: Liberal
- Education: University of Western Australia
- Website: www.andreamitchell.com.au

Andrea Ruth Mitchell (27 February 1956 – 4 April 2020) was an Australian politician who was a member of the Legislative Assembly of Western Australia from 2008 to 2017, representing the seat of Kingsley. She was a minister in the government of Colin Barnett from March 2016.

== Early life ==
Mitchell was born in Brisbane, Queensland, to Margaret Isabel (née Gracie) and Ronald Selby Mitchell. She and her family moved to Perth when she was 13, where she attended Melville Senior High School. She went on to the University of Western Australia, receiving a Bachelor of Physical Education degree and a teaching diploma. Mitchell worked as a physical education teacher for 15 years at various Perth high schools, and was then employed by the state government's Department of Sport and Recreation, initially as a consultant and then in managerial positions. She was also president of Tennis West from 1996 to 2008, a director of Tennis Australia from 1997 to 2008, and a director of the Hopman Cup. In 2000, Mitchell was awarded the Australian Sports Medal for her work.

== Politics ==
At the 2008 state election, Mitchell ran for the Liberal Party in the seat of Kingsley. She defeated the sitting Labor member, Judy Hughes, with 54.5 percent of the two-party-preferred vote. Mitchell increased her majority at the 2013 election, recording 60.0 percent on first preferences and 64.8 of the two-party-preferred vote to turn Kingsley into a safe Liberal seat. Mitchell made her maiden speech to the Legislative Assembly on Thursday, 6 November 2008.

After the 2013 election, she was made a parliamentary secretary. In 2014, Mitchell worked through the Legislative Assembly to pass the Mental Health Act 2014. Mitchell was elevated to the ministry in March 2016, replacing Helen Morton as Minister for Child Protection and Minister for Mental Health. Mitchell narrowly lost Kingsley to Labor's Jessica Stojkovski at the 11 March 2017 state election by 307 votes after preferences, making the seat of Kingsley the second most marginal seat in WA after Labor's landslide election win.

Mitchell died on 4 April 2020, as a result of a long-term heart condition.

== See also ==
- Women in the Western Australian Legislative Assembly

Parliament of Western Australia
Preceded by Judy Hughes	Member for Kingsley; 2008–2017	Succeeded by Jessica Stojkovski
Political offices
Preceded by Helen Morton	Minister for Mental Health; 2016–2017	Succeeded by Alanna Clohesy
Preceded by Helen Morton	Minister for Child Protection; 2016–2017	Succeeded by Simone McGurk
