= Judy Hughes =

Australian politician (born 1959)

Member of the Western Australian Legislative Assembly for Kingsley
- In office 26 February 2005 – 6 September 2008
- Preceded by: Cheryl Edwardes
- Succeeded by: Andrea Mitchell

Personal details
- Born: 28 April 1959 (age 66) Subiaco, Western Australia, Australia
- Party: Labor Party

Judith Hughes (née Verhagen, born 28 April 1959 in Subiaco, Western Australia) is an Australian politician. She was a Labor member of the Western Australian Legislative Assembly from 2005 to 2008, representing the electorate of Kingsley.

Following the retirement of Cheryl Edwardes, who had held the seat of Kingsley since 1989 for the Liberal Party, Hughes contested the seat in the 2005 election and narrowly won the seat with a margin of 0.8%. A redistribution ahead of the 2008 state election all but eliminated the Labor margin, and Hughes was defeated by Liberal candidate Andrea Mitchell

In 2006, Hughes was appointed as Acting Speaker of the Legislative Assembly and as the deputy government whip in the Legislative Assembly.
