= Arthur Tonkin (politician) =

Australian politician (1930–2022)

The Honourable Arthur Tonkin

Member of the Legislative Assembly of Western Australia
- In office 20 February 1971 – 30 March 1974
- Preceded by: Doug Cash
- Succeeded by: None (seat abolished)
- Constituency: Mirrabooka
- In office 30 March 1974 – 19 February 1983
- Preceded by: None (new seat)
- Succeeded by: None (seat abolished)
- Constituency: Morley
- In office 19 February 1983 – 18 March 1987
- Preceded by: None (new seat)
- Succeeded by: Frank Donovan
- Constituency: Morley-Swan

Personal details
- Born: 21 January 1930 Kelmscott, Western Australia
- Died: 5 May 2022 (aged 92)
- Party: Labor
- Education: University of Western Australia

Arthur Raymond Tonkin (21 January 1930 – 5 May 2022) was an Australian politician who was a Labor Party member of the Legislative Assembly of Western Australia from 1971 to 1987. He was a minister in the government of Brian Burke.

== Biography ==
Arthur Tonkin was born in Perth to Florence May (née Cole) and Norman Sedrick Tonkin. He studied at the University of Western Australia and Claremont Teachers College, and subsequently worked as a teacher (both in the metropolitan area and in the country). A member of the State School Teachers Union, Tonkin was elected to parliament at the 1971 state election, winning the seat of Mirrabooka from the Liberal Party's Doug Cash. His seat was abolished at the 1974 election, and he successfully transferred to the new seat of Morley. Tonkin was elevated to shadow cabinet after the 1977 election, and would serve under three leaders of the opposition (Colin Jamieson, Ron Davies, and Brian Burke).

At a redistribution prior to the 1983 state election, Tonkin's seat was abolished and replaced with the new seat of Morley-Swan. After the election, which Labor won, he was made Minister for Water Resources, Minister for Consumer Affairs, and Minister for Parliamentary and Electoral Reform, as well as Leader of the House. He lost the consumer affairs portfolio to Peter Dowding in December 1983, having presented "too hardline an image" in his dealings with business. In a reshuffle after the 1986 election, Tonkin lost the electoral reform portfolio to Mal Bryce, but replaced Jeff Carr as Minister for Police and Emergency Services. However, he resigned from the ministry less than three months later, and resigned from parliament altogether in March 1987.

Parliament of Western Australia
Preceded by Doug Cash	Member for Mirrabooka; 1971–1974	Abolished
New seat	Member for Morley; 1974–1983	Abolished
New seat	Member for Morley-Swan; 1983–1987	Succeeded by Frank Donovan
Political offices
Preceded by Richard Shalders	Minister for Consumer Affairs; 1983	Succeeded by Peter Dowding
Preceded by Andrew Mensaros	Minister for Water Resources; 1983–1986	Succeeded by Des Dans
New creation	Minister for Parliamentary and Electoral Reform; 1983–1986	Succeeded by Mal Bryce
Preceded by Jeff Carr	Minister for Police and Emergency Services; 1986	Succeeded by Gordon Hill
