= Electoral district of Morley =

State electoral district in Perth, Western Australia

Morley Western Australia—Legislative Assembly
- Interactive map of electoral district boundaries from the 2025 state election
- State: Western Australia
- Dates current: 1974–1996; 2008–present
- MP: Amber-Jade Sanderson
- Party: Labor
- Namesake: Morley
- Electors: 30,910 (2025)
- Area: 20 km^{2} (7.7 sq mi)
- Demographic: Metropolitan
- Coordinates: 31.89°S 115.88°E
Electorates around Morley:
Girrawheen	West Swan	Bassendean
Balcatta	Morley	Bassendean
Balcatta	Mount Lawley	Maylands

Morley is an electoral district of the Legislative Assembly in the Australian state of Western Australia.

Morley existed as an electoral district from 1974 to 1996, and was restored as an electorate name in 2008. Between 1983 and 1989 it was known was Morley-Swan.

The district is situated in the northern suburbs of Perth.

== Geography ==
Situated in the densely populated inner northern suburbs of Perth, the district covers the entirety of the suburbs of Nollamara and Noranda; and parts of Beechboro, Dianella and Morley.

== History ==
Morley was first created for the 1974 state election. At the 1983 state election, it was renamed Morley-Swan with the abolition of Swan. The district reverted to the name Morley at the 1989 state election and was abolished ahead of the 1996 state election.

The district was held by Labor at all times, with the exception of the period between 1991 and 1993, when former Labor MP Frank Donovan sat as an independent. The member at the time of Morley's abolition, Labor MP Clive Brown, went on to represent the newly created seat of Bassendean from 1996 to 2005.

A new district named Morley was created for the 2008 state election following the one vote, one value reforms. The majority of the district's voters came from the abolished seat of Ballajura. Nearly all of the remainder of district's territory formerly belonged to Yokine and Maylands; a small part also came from Bassendean.

The new district was created with a Labor majority of 59.9% to 40.1% versus the Liberal Party. However, Liberal candidate Ian Britza captured the seat at the 2008 state election, overcoming the large notional margin due in part to the candidacy of independent candidate and former MP for Ballajura John D'Orazio, who directed preferences to the Liberal candidate ahead of Labor candidate Reece Whitby.

== Members for Morley ==
Morley (1974–1983)
Member	Party	Term
Arthur Tonkin	Labor	1974–1983
Morley-Swan (1983–1989)
Member	Party	Term
Arthur Tonkin	Labor	1983–1987
Frank Donovan	Labor	1987–1989
Morley (1989–1996)
Member	Party	Term
Frank Donovan	Labor	1989–1991
Frank Donovan	Independent	1991–1993
Clive Brown	Labor	1993–1996
Morley (2008–present)
Member	Party	Term
Ian Britza	Liberal	2008–2017
Amber-Jade Sanderson	Labor	2017–present

== Election results ==
2025 Western Australian state election: Morley
Party	Candidate	Votes	%	±%
Labor	Amber-Jade Sanderson	12,918	50.7	−18.6
Liberal	Aswath Chavittupara	7,479	29.4	+12.7
Greens	Kaelin Charles Abrahams	2,888	11.3	+5.0
One Nation	Conor Doyle	1,179	4.6	+2.6
Christians	Giulio G. Di Somma	660	2.6	−0.5
Shooters, Fishers, Farmers	Cameron Yates	351	1.4	+1.4
Total formal votes		25,475	94.7	−0.6
Informal votes		1,439	5.3	+0.6
Turnout		26,914	87.1	+2.5
Two-party-preferred result
Labor	Amber-Jade Sanderson	15,795	62.0	−15.8
Liberal	Aswath Chavittupara	9,671	38.0	+15.8
Labor hold		Swing	−15.8	
