= Meredith Hammat =

Australian politician (born 1969)

Meredith Hammat MLA
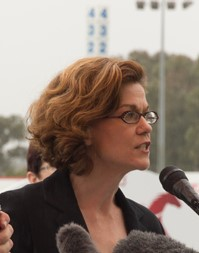

Minister for Health
- Incumbent
- Assumed office 19 March 2025
- Premier: Roger Cook
- Preceded by: Amber-Jade Sanderson

Assembly Member for Girrawheen
- Incumbent
- Assumed office 8 March 2025
- Preceded by: Margaret Quirk (2017-2021)

Member of the Western Australian Legislative Assembly for Mirrabooka
- In office 13 March 2021 – 8 March 2025
- Preceded by: Janine Freeman
- Succeeded by: Seat abolished

Personal details
- Born: 13 July 1969 (age 56) Katanning, Western Australia
- Party: Labor
- Website: www.meredithhammat.com.au

Meredith Jane Hammat (born 13 July 1969) is an Australian politician. She has been a Labor member of the Western Australian Legislative Assembly since the 2021 state election, representing Mirrabooka from 2021 to 2025 and Girrawheen from 2025.

Hammat graduated from the University of Western Australia with a BA in politics and industrial relations and a MA in labor and industrial relations.

Prior to entering parliament she worked for the Australian Services Union from 1995 to 2012. From 2012 to 2020 she was State Secretary of UnionsWA. In December 2020 she was selected to replace the retiring sitting member, Janine Freeman. In her election campaign Hammat received support through EMILY's List Australia.

In December 2022, she became a parliamentary secretary to Tony Buti, the minister for education, aboriginal affairs, and citizenship and multicultural interests.

Hammat was re-elected in the 2025 Western Australian state election. After she was named the new Minister for Health.

Western Australian Legislative Assembly
Preceded by Janine Freeman	Member for Mirrabooka; 2021–2025	District abolished
District created	Member for Girrawheen; 2025–present	Incumbent
