= John Kobelke =

Australian politician (1949–2019)

The Honourable John Kobelke

Member of the Western Australian Parliament for Balcatta
- In office 26 February 2005 – 9 March 2013
- Preceded by: New creation
- Succeeded by: Chris Hatton

Member of the Western Australian Parliament for Nollamara
- In office 4 February 1989 – 25 February 2005
- Preceded by: Keith Wilson
- Succeeded by: Seat abolished

Personal details
- Born: John Charles Kobelke; 30 June 1949 Mount Lawley, Western Australia
- Died: 23 June 2019 (aged 69) Perth, Western Australia
- Citizenship: Australian
- Party: Labor Party
- Profession: Teacher

John Charles Kobelke (30 June 1949 – 23 June 2019) was an Australian politician. He was an ALP member of the Western Australian Legislative Assembly from 1989 to 2013.

Until the defeat of the Carpenter government in 2008, Kobelke was variously Minister for Police and Emergency Services; Community Safety; Water Resources; Sport and Recreation.

== Biography ==
He was educated at Christian Brothers' High School, Highgate and the University of Western Australia. He also taught at various schools across Perth.

In 1989, he was elected to the seat of Nollamara, which has since been renamed Balcatta. During 1992 he was the Parliamentary Secretary to Cabinet in the Lawrence Government.

During the years of 1993 to 2000, when the Labor Party was in opposition, he served as the spokesperson for Labour Relations, Planning, Lands, Housing, Youth, Education, Employment and Training, Works and Services and Freedom of Information.

He served the portfolios of Training from 2001 to 2003 and as the Minister assisting in public sector management from 2003 to 2005.

On 20 March 2012, Kobelke announced that he would not stand for re-election in the 2013 Western Australian State election for personal reasons.

Kobelke died at a hospital in Perth on 23 June 2019.

Western Australian Legislative Assembly
Preceded by Keith Wilson	Member for Nollamara; 1989–2005	District abolished
District created	Member for Balcatta; 2005–2013	Succeeded by Chris Hatton
