= Electoral district of Kingsley =

Kingsley Western Australia—Legislative Assembly
- Interactive map of electoral district boundaries from the 2025 state election
- State: Western Australia
- Dates current: 1989–present
- MP: Jessica Stojkovski
- Party: Labor
- Namesake: Kingsley
- Electors: 31,628 (2025)
- Area: 27 km^{2} (10.4 sq mi)
- Demographic: Metropolitan
- Coordinates: 31.82°S 115.80°E
Electorates around Kingsley:
Joondalup	Wanneroo	Landsdale
Hillarys	Kingsley	Landsdale
Carine	Balcatta	Girrawheen

Kingsley is an electoral district of the Legislative Assembly in the Australian state of Western Australia.

The district is located in the northern suburbs of Perth.

== Geography ==
Located in the northern suburbs of Perth, the district of Kingsley is a north–south elongated electorate bordered by four major roads. It is bounded to the west by the Mitchell Freeway, to the north by Ocean Reef Road, to the east by Wanneroo Road and to the south by Beach Road. The district covers the entirety of five suburbs: Kingsley, Greenwood, Hamersley, Warwick and Woodvale.

== History ==
Kingsley was first created ahead of the 1989 state election and won by Liberal candidate Cheryl Edwardes. Edwardes held the seat until her retirement at the 2005 state election, when her husband Colin Edwardes ran to succeed her as the new Liberal candidate, but was defeated by Labor candidate Judy Hughes. Kingsley was the only seat the Labor Party took from the Liberal Party at the 2005 election.

A redistribution ahead of the 2008 state election mostly wiped out the Labor margin in Kingsley. Accordingly, Hughes was defeated after one term by Liberal candidate Andrea Mitchell. Mitchell was re-elected in 2013, but was defeated in 2017 by Labor candidate Jessica Stojkovski.

== Members for Kingsley ==
Member	Party	Term
Cheryl Edwardes	Liberal	1989–2005
Judy Hughes	Labor	2005–2008
Andrea Mitchell	Liberal	2008–2017
Jessica Stojkovski	Labor	2017–present

== Election results ==
2025 Western Australian state election: Kingsley
Party	Candidate	Votes	%	±%
Labor	Jessica Stojkovski	11,714	42.3	−18.2
Liberal	Scott Edwardes	10,420	37.6	+7.4
Greens	Sheridan Young	3,027	10.9	+5.4
One Nation	Natalie Whitten	917	3.3	+1.6
Christians	Josephine Bartley	707	2.6	+2.6
Independent	Martyn Shipton	635	2.3	+2.3
Shooters, Fishers, Farmers	Adam Johnson	280	1.0	+1.0
Total formal votes		27,700	96.3	−0.5
Informal votes		1,079	3.7	+0.5
Turnout		28,779	91.0	+3.0
Two-party-preferred result
Labor	Jessica Stojkovski	14,802	53.5	−13.4
Liberal	Scott Edwardes	12,888	46.5	+13.4
Labor hold		Swing	−13.4	
