= 2008 Western Australian state election =

Australian state election

- 6 September 2008

All 59 seats in the Western Australian Legislative Assembly and all 36 seats in the Western Australian Legislative Council 30 Assembly seats were needed for a majority
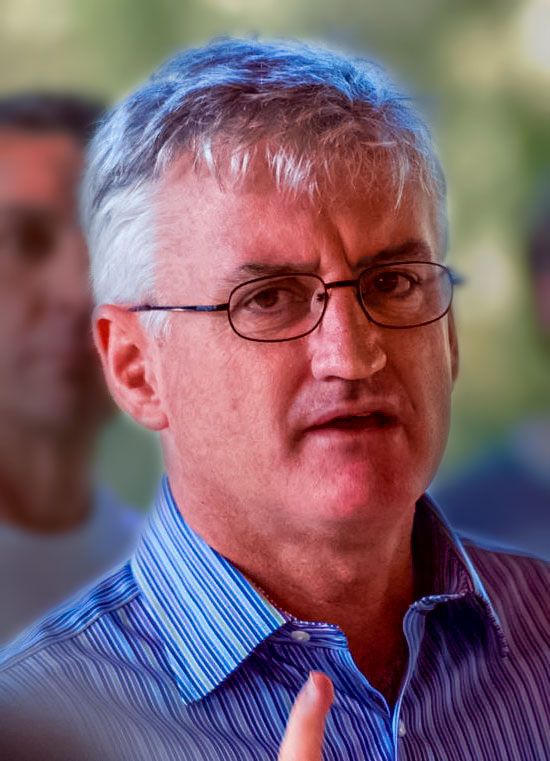

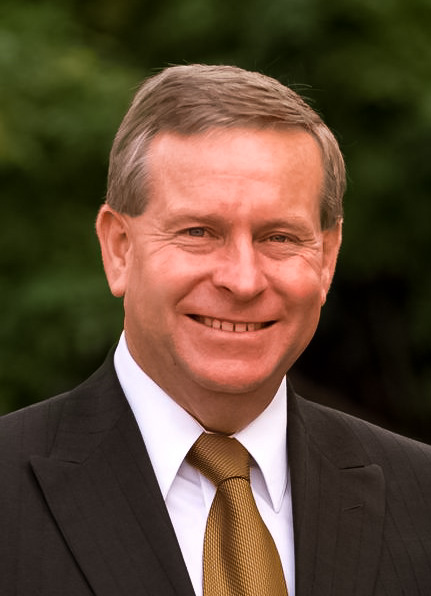

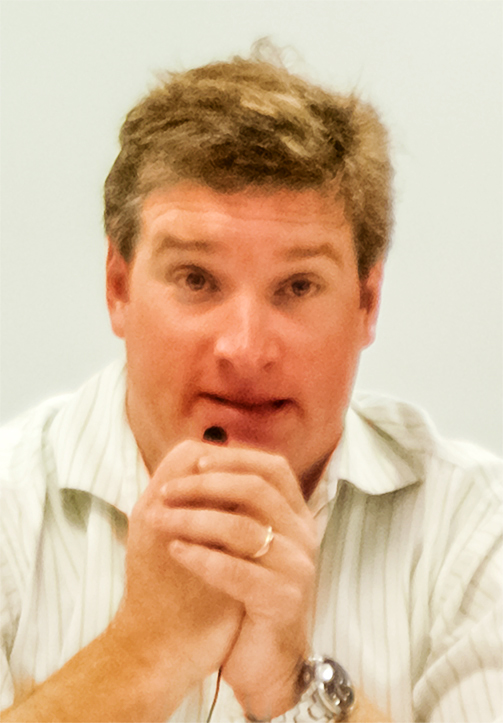
	First party	Second party	Third party
Leader	Alan Carpenter	Colin Barnett	Brendon Grylls
Party	Labor	Liberal	National
Leader since	25 January 2006	6 August 2008	21 June 2005
Leader's seat	Willagee	Cottesloe	Central Wheatbelt
Last election	32 seats	18 seats	5 seats
Seats won	28	24	4
Seat change	▼4	▲6	▼1
First preference vote	390,339	418,208	53,086
Percentage	35.84%	38.39%	4.87%
Swing	▼6.05	▲2.76	▲1.18
TPP	48.15%	51.85%
TPP swing	▼4.13	▲4.13
- The map on the left shows the first party preference by electorate. The map on the right shows the final two-party preferred vote result by electorate.
Premier before election
Alan Carpenter
Labor
Resulting Premier
Colin Barnett
Liberal

The 2008 Western Australian state election was held on Saturday 6 September 2008 to elect 59 members to the Legislative Assembly and 36 members to the Legislative Council. The incumbent centre-left Labor Party government, in power since the 2001 election and led since 25 January 2006 by Premier Alan Carpenter, was defeated by the centre-right Liberal Party opposition, led by Opposition Leader Colin Barnett since 6 August 2008.

The election resulted in a hung parliament with no party gaining a majority. Labor was two seats short of a majority in the expanded legislature. Ultimately, the Liberals were able to form a coalition government with the WA Nationals, supported by three independents. While both parties agreed to National demands that at least 25 percent of mining proceeds go to regional projects, the Nationals ultimately went with the Liberals. According to Nationals leader Brendon Grylls, a Labor-National coalition would have required Green support to get mining legislation passed in the Legislative Council. The coalition agreement gave National Party ministers "the right to exempt [themselves] from Cabinet and vote against an issue on the floor of the Parliament if it's against the wishes of the people [they] represent".This was an explicit rejection of the collective cabinet responsibility under former non-Labor coalition agreements, which made the Nationals virtual co-owners of Liberal policies.

The election was the first to be held since a major electoral redistribution was implemented in 2007. This redistribution involved significant changes to the geographic distribution of parliamentary seats and regions in Western Australia, and brought the state into line with the rest of Australia in adopting one vote one value for the lower house. The principle calls for all electoral divisions to have the same number of enrolled voters (not residents or population), within a specified percentage of variance.

The election was called earlier than expected by Alan Carpenter, who requested the Governor to dissolve parliament on 7 August 2008.

== Results ==
=== Legislative Assembly ===
Winning party by electorate.

Western Australian state election, 6 September 2008 Legislative Assembly << 2005–2013 >>
Enrolled voters	1,330,399				
Votes cast	1,150,497		Turnout	86.48%	–3.36%
Informal votes	61,200		Informal	5.32%	+0.08%
Summary of votes by party
Party	Primary votes	%	Swing	Seats	Change
Liberal	418,208	38.39	▲+2.76	24	+ 6
Labor	390,339	35.84	▼–6.05	28	– 4
Greens	129,827	11.92	▲+4.35	0	± 0
National	53,086	4.87	▲+1.18	4	– 1
Christian Democrats	28,079	2.58	▼–0.36	0	± 0
Family First	21,204	1.95	▼–0.08	0	± 0
Citizens Electoral Council	1,161	0.11	▲+0.02	0	± 0
Independent	47,353	4.35	▲+0.19	3	+ 1
Total	1,089,257			59	
Two-party-preferred
Liberal/National	564,490	51.85%	▲+4.13%		
Labor	524,149	48.15%	▼–4.13%		

=== Legislative Council ===
Western Australian state election, 6 September 2008 Legislative Council
Enrolled voters	1,330,399				
Votes cast	1,151,482		Turnout	86.55%	–3.45%
Informal votes	32,643		Informal	2.83%	–0.35%
Summary of votes by party
Party	Primary votes	%	Swing	Seats	Change
Liberal	443,064	39.60	▲+2.48	16	+ 1
Labor	404,389	36.14	▼–7.21	11	– 5
Greens	123,942	11.08	▲+3.56	4	+ 2
National	59,505	5.32	▲+3.13	5	+ 4
Family First	28,149	2.52	▲+0.51	0	± 0
Christian Democrats	25,962	2.32	▲+0.04	0	± 0
One Nation	7,012	0.63	▼–0.96	0	± 0
Daylight Saving Party	6,806	0.61	New	0	± 0
Citizens Electoral Council	2,975	0.27	▲+0.21	0	± 0
New Country Party	555	0.05	▼–0.26	0	± 0
Independent	16,480	1.47	▼-2.11	0	± 0
Total	1,118,839			36	

== Summary of results ==
Popular vote
Liberal	38.39%
Labor	35.84%
Greens	11.92%
National	4.87%
Others	8.98%

% of the seats won
Liberal/National	47.46%
Labor	47.46%
Others	5.08%

== Seats changing hands ==
Seat	Pre-2008			Swing	Post-2008		
Seat	Party	Member	Margin	Swing	Margin	Member	Party
Albany	Liberal	notional	2.3	2.5	0.2	Peter Watson	Labor
Bunbury	Labor	notional	0.9	12.6	11.7	John Castrilli	Liberal
Darling Range	Labor	notional	0.8	6.3	5.6	Tony Simpson	Liberal
Jandakot	Labor	notional – new seat	3.6	5.5	1.8	Joe Francis	Liberal
Kalgoorlie	Liberal	Matt Birney	9.6*	53.6	3.6**	John Bowler	Independent
Kingsley	Labor	Judy Hughes	0.1	4.6	4.5	Andrea Mitchell	Liberal
Moore	Liberal	Gary Snook	2.8	5.9	3.1	Grant Woodhams	National
Morley	Labor	notional – new seat	9.9	10.8	0.9	Ian Britza	Liberal
Mount Lawley	Labor	notional – new seat	5.9	8.1	2.2	Michael Sutherland	Liberal
Ocean Reef	Labor	notional – new seat	1.6	6.0	4.4	Albert Jacob	Liberal
Riverton	Labor	Tony McRae	2.1	2.2	0.2	Mike Nahan	Liberal
Southern River	Labor	Paul Andrews	5.1	6.8	1.6	Peter Abetz	Liberal
Swan Hills	Labor	Jaye Radisich	3.6	7.1	3.5	Frank Alban	Liberal
Wanneroo	Labor	Dianne Guise	6.1	6.9	0.7	Paul Miles	Liberal

- Members listed in italics did not contest their seat at this election.
- * Kalgoorlie's first margin figure is Liberal vs. Labor
- ** Kalgoorlie's second margin figure is Independent vs. National

== Post-election pendulum ==
Liberal/National seats
Marginal
Riverton	Mike Nahan	LIB	0.2
Wanneroo	Paul Miles	LIB	0.7
Morley	Ian Britza	LIB	0.9
Southern River	Peter Abetz	LIB	1.6
Jandakot	Joe Francis	LIB	1.8
Mount Lawley	Michael Sutherland	LIB	2.2
Nedlands	Bill Marmion	LIB	2.5 v IND
Moore	Grant Woodhams	NAT	3.1 v LIB
Swan Hills	Frank Alban	LIB	3.5
Eyre	Graham Jacobs	LIB	3.6 v NAT
Ocean Reef	Albert Jacob	LIB	4.4
Kingsley	Andrea Mitchell	LIB	4.5
Scarborough	Liza Harvey	LIB	5.2
Darling Range	Tony Simpson	LIB	5.6
Fairly safe
Kalamunda	John Day	LIB	6.3
Murray-Wellington	Murray Cowper	LIB	8.4
Geraldton	Ian Blayney	LIB	8.5
Safe
Dawesville	Kim Hames	LIB	11.1
Bateman	Christian Porter	LIB	11.4
Hillarys	Rob Johnson	LIB	11.4
Bunbury	John Castrilli	LIB	11.7
Vasse	Troy Buswell	LIB	13.5
South Perth	John McGrath	LIB	14.3
Carine	Tony Krsticevic	LIB	14.5
Blackwood-Stirling	Terry Redman	NAT	17.3 v LIB
Central Wheatbelt	Brendon Grylls	NAT	17.9 v LIB
Cottesloe	Colin Barnett	LIB	19.4
Very safe
Wagin	Terry Waldron	NAT	27.1 v LIB
Independent seats
Alfred Cove	Janet Woollard	IND LIB	1.0 v LIB
Kalgoorlie	John Bowler	IND	3.6 v NAT
Churchlands	Liz Constable	IND	23.5 v ALP

Labor seats
Marginal
Albany	Peter Watson	ALP	0.2
Forrestfield	Andrew Waddell	ALP	0.2
Kwinana	Roger Cook	ALP	0.8 v IND
Collie-Preston	Mick Murray	ALP	1.0
Balcatta	John Kobelke	ALP	2.3
North West	Vince Catania	ALP	3.1
Joondalup	Tony O'Gorman	ALP	3.5
Pilbara	Tom Stephens	ALP	3.6
West Swan	Rita Saffioti	ALP	4.4
Gosnells	Chris Tallentire	ALP	5.5
Fairly safe
Belmont	Eric Ripper	ALP	6.7
Kimberley	Carol Martin	ALP	6.8
Perth	John Hyde	ALP	7.8
Midland	Michelle Roberts	ALP	8.3
Mindarie	John Quigley	ALP	8.5
Cannington	Bill Johnston	ALP	9.0
Maylands	Lisa Baker	ALP	9.0
Victoria Park	Ben Wyatt	ALP	9.0
Cockburn	Fran Logan	ALP	9.6
Warnbro	Paul Papalia	ALP	9.7
Safe
Bassendean	Martin Whitely	ALP	10.3
Mandurah	David Templeman	ALP	10.5
Rockingham	Mark McGowan	ALP	10.6
Girrawheen	Margaret Quirk	ALP	11.5
Fremantle	Jim McGinty	ALP	12.0
Nollamara	Janine Freeman	ALP	12.7
Willagee	Alan Carpenter	ALP	14.6
Armadale	Alannah MacTiernan	ALP	14.9

== Background ==
=== Electoral changes ===
The 2008 election takes place with entirely new boundaries determined in a redistribution finalised on 29 October 2007 by the Western Australian Electoral Commission. Prior to the redistribution, the Electoral Act 1907, which governs elections in the state, specified that the metropolitan region which includes Perth and its suburbs, was to be divided into 34 Assembly districts or 60% of the seats, while the rest of the state was to be divided into 23 or 40% of the seats. However, at the 2006 census, taken on 8 August 2006, 73.76% of Western Australians lived in the metropolitan region. This meant that each member of the Legislative Assembly, as at 30 September 2007, was representing either 28,519 metropolitan voters or 14,551 country voters.

One vote one value had long been sought by the Labor Party, that party claiming to be disadvantaged by the familiar reality that country constituencies have tended to elect non-Labor members. The Burke Labor government (1983–1988), with the conditional support of the National Party, managed to achieve limited reform—through the Acts Amendment (Electoral Reform) Act 1987—in increasing the metropolitan quota from 29 to 34, redesigning the Legislative Council (or Upper House) into a Senate-style body with six uneven multi-member seats filled by a system of STV proportional representation, and creating a permanent, funded Electoral Commission as a body fully independent from Parliament and the executive. Between Burke's retirement from politics in 1988 and Labor's election loss five years later, the government faced a hostile upper house, considerable distractions by way of the WA Inc royal commission and, after 1991, was a minority government unable to achieve further electoral reform.

Following Labor's win at the 2001 election, the new premier Geoff Gallop and attorney-general Jim McGinty were committed to implementing 'one vote, one value'. By this time, all other states and territories had eliminated electoral malapportionment. Unlike their predecessors, they could count on the support of half of the upper-house members for passage of the electoral legislation but, as the proposed legislation involved constitutional change, an absolute majority of the members was necessary. The Government went to the High Court in 2003 to determine whether the Legislative Council president's casting vote could be used to obtain the majority, but the High Court answered that it could not. Change occurred, however, when the Liberal Party, which staunchly opposed the reform, failed to preselect one of their North Metropolitan MLCs, Alan Cadby, in a bid to get Peter Collier into the Legislative Council at the 2005 election. Cadby resigned from the Liberal Party and completed his term as an Independent, consenting to Labor's electoral legislation with some amendments. On 20 May 2005, just before newly elected upper-house members were to take their places, the Electoral Amendment and Repeal Act 2005 (No.1 of 2005) passed.

The passage of the Electoral Reform (Electoral Funding) Act 2006 into law on 26 October 2006 means that, for the first time, candidates, parties and Legislative Council groups will be able to receive public funding based on their performance in terms of votes at the election as well as a refund of their nomination deposit if they receive over 4% of the primary vote, as is the case in several other states and in federal elections. The rate for the 2008 election has been set at $1.56888 per vote. The legislation, which was Attorney-General Jim McGinty's second attempt to introduce the measure, was explicitly based on the 1992 reforms of Queensland's Electoral Act and was intended to improve accountability and increase candidates' immunity, or perceived immunity, from outside influences. Prior to the 2008 election, candidates could receive a refund of their nomination deposit only if they achieved 10% of the total primary vote. Earlier similar legislation had failed in November 2003, despite an in-principle agreement with then opposition leader Colin Barnett, owing to Liberal backbench opposition and a campaign against the proposal by the West Australian newspaper, which termed the measure as a 'poll tax'.

=== The electoral system ===
The Western Australian Legislative Assembly has a total of 59 seats, up from 57 in the last parliament. The last increase in seats, from 55 to 57, occurred before the 1983 election. Since the enactment of the Electoral Act 1907, each seat is filled by a single member selected using instant-runoff preferential voting. In order for a valid vote to be cast, voters must number all candidates on the ballot paper in the order of their preference as with Australian House of Representatives elections. At the election, 42 of the seats are located in the metropolitan area, 12 in the Agricultural and South West regions, and 5 in the Mining and Pastoral region in the north and east of the state. Seats in the Mining and Pastoral region are permitted to be under quota on account of their significant geographical size, but all other seats have a quota of 21,350 voters with a maximum variance of 10%.

The Western Australian Legislative Council, sometimes referred to as the 'upper house', consists of 36 members, with 6 elected from each of 6 multi-member regions (also known as constituencies). The system used for voting is known as Single transferable vote, which is a variant of the proportional representation system. The ballot paper (voting form), traditionally printed on pink coloured paper, is divided into two sections. The voter casts a vote in either one of two ways – by writing the numeral "1" on the left hand side corresponding to the party of choice, or by numbering all candidates on the right hand side of the form according to his/her preference. If the voter chooses the first method, the vote is then counted according to the publicly known preference listing for the party chosen by the voter. The same voting system is used for electing members to the Australian Senate.

Members of the Legislative Council, unlike those in the Legislative Assembly, hold their seats for a fixed term of four years. They take their seats in the house on 22 May following the date of their election. The Legislative Council is not dissolved prior to the end of each four-year term, even if a general election is held several months prior to the end of the term. For this reason, members elected to the Legislative Council in the 2008 election did not take their seats until May 2009.

=== Counting the votes ===
More than 100,000 electors (7.5% of the electorate) cast their votes prior to election day, either by post or in person. Checking the eligibility of these votes commences 3 days prior to election day at the Count Centre in Fremantle. After the close of polls at 6:00 pm, ballot boxes are emptied and a provisional count of ordinary votes is conducted at each of the 800 polling places. Preliminary results are telephoned to District and Regional Returning Officers, who forward aggregated results to the Tally Room at ABC's East Perth studios.

Election night results are provisional for several reasons. Firstly, there is insufficient time to conduct a full distribution of voter preferences in those Legislative Assembly seats that require it. The official count for all Assembly districts does not commence till after the closing date for postal votes which is the Thursday following the election. Secondly, only ticket votes and first-preference votes for candidates on non-ticket ballots for the Legislative Council are counted on election night, providing only a notional distribution for each region. The high proportion of early votes cast in this election along with the large number of absentee votes cast on election day (caused by elector confusion arising from the recent changes to electoral boundaries) was expected to delay the determination of final results, particularly in closely fought seats.

Legislative Council ballot papers and all declaration (absentee and provisional) votes cast on election day are delivered to the Count Centre on Sunday where the official count of these votes continues for 7–10 days. Ticket votes are sorted (ticket/non-ticket/informal) then manually counted, while preferences on non-ticket ballots are entered into a computer database under the scrutiny of party officials. The ticket vote results are added to the full preference results and the final result determined. Finally, all Legislative Assembly votes are officially counted by each District Returning Officer who then declares (announces) the successful candidate for the particular district.

== Key dates ==
- Issue of writ: 6 pm, 7 August
- Nominations open: 8 August
- Close of nominations: 12 noon, 15 August
- Close of rolls: 6 pm, 15 August
- Postal voting commences: 18 August
- Pre-poll voting commences: 19 August
- Polling day: 6 September
- Return of writ: On or before 4 November

== Polling ==
Newspoll polling was conducted via random telephone number selection in city and country areas. Sampling sizes normally consist of around 800–900 electors, with the 10 – 14 August poll consisting of 1088 electors, and the 2 – 4 September poll consisting of 1802 electors. The margin of error was around ±3.5 percent, while the 2 – 4 September poll had a declared margin of error of ±2.3 percent.

Better Premier ratings
Date	Labor Carpenter	Liberal Barnett	Uncommitted
2008 election	–	–	–
2 – 4 Sep 2008	48%	35%	17%
10 – 14 Aug 2008	49%	31%	20%
Apr – Jun 2008	64%	14%^{1}	22%
Jan – Mar 2008	61%	12%^{1}	27%
Oct – Dec 2007	63%	13%^{2}	24%
Jul – Sep 2007	59%	14%^{2}	27%
Apr – Jun 2007	59%	14%^{2}	27%
Jan – Mar 2007	63%	14%^{2}	23%
Oct – Dec 2006	54%	17%^{2}	29%
Jul – Sep 2006	52%	15%^{2}	33%
Apr – Jun 2006	58%	12%^{2}	30%
Jan – Mar 2006	56%	14%^{4}	30%
Oct – Dec 2005	51%^{3}	25%^{4}	24%
2005 election	–	–	–
23 – 24 Feb 2005	58%^{3}	27%^{5}	15%
Polling conducted by Newspoll and published in The Australian.^{1} Buswell, ^{2} Omodei, ^{3} Gallop, ^{4} Birney, ^{5} Barnett

Legislative Assembly opinion polling
	Primary vote					2PP vote
Date	ALP	Lib	Nat	Grn	Oth	ALP	Lib/Nat
2008 election	35.8%	38.4%	4.9%	11.9%	9.0%	48.1%	51.9%
2 – 4 Sep 2008	35%	37%	6%	12%	10%	50%	50%
10 – 14 Aug 2008	42%	37%	5%	10%	6%	51%	49%
Apr – Jun 2008	41%	31%	4%	16%	8%	54%	46%
Jan – Mar 2008	42%	35%	3%	12%	8%	53%	47%
Oct – Dec 2007	40%	41%	4%	8%	7%	49%	51%
Jul – Sep 2007	44%	38%	5%	6%	7%	51%	49%
Apr – Jun 2007	44%	35%	3%	8%	10%	54%	46%
Jan – Mar 2007	39%	35%	4%	10%	12%	51%	49%
Oct – Dec 2006	38%	40%	2%	7%	13%	49%	51%
Jul – Sep 2006	42%	37%	3%	6%	12%	52%	48%
Apr – Jun 2006	42%	37%	3%	4%	14%	52%	48%
Jan – Mar 2006	42%	35%	4%	8%	11%	53%	47%
Oct – Dec 2005	37%	39%	4%	5%	15%	48%	52%
2005 election	41.9%	35.6%	3.7%	7.6%	11.2%	52.3%	47.7%
23 – 24 Feb 2005	45%	36.5%	3%	7%	8.5%	54%	46%
Polling conducted by Newspoll and published in The Australian.
