= Keith Wilson (Western Australian politician) =

Australian politician

Keith James Wilson AM (born 5 September 1936) is an Australian politician.

He was born in Kalgoorlie to miner James Wilson and Barbara Jean McKenzie. He attended local public schools and became a teacher, graduating in 1955. After a period teaching at Mount Barker, he trained for the Anglican clergy from 1959 to 1961. From 1961 to 1965 he was the assistant priest for the Scarborough parish, and from 1965 to 1967 he taught in the United Kingdom. On 24 August 1968, he married Angela Joy Hankin, with whom he had two sons. From 1969 he was an Anglican clergyman at Balga. In 1977 he was elected to the Western Australian Legislative Assembly as the Labor member for Dianella; he represented this seat until 1983, Nollamara until 1989, and then Dianella again until 1993. He was the first clergyman elected to the Parliament of Western Australia following a change to the constitution. In 1981 he became Shadow Minister for Housing, Community Welfare and Youth, Sport and Recreation. He was appointed Minister for Housing, Youth and Community Services in 1983; he held this portfolio under various names until 1988, when he became Minister for Health. He left the ministry in 1992 and lost his seat at the following year's election; soon after he resigned from the Labor Party altogether.

Western Australian Legislative Assembly
New seat	Member for Dianella; 1977–1983	Abolished
New seat	Member for Nollamara; 1983–1989	Succeeded by John Kobelke
New seat	Member for Dianella; 1989–1993	Succeeded by Kim Hames
