= Electoral district of Girrawheen =

Former state electoral district of Western Australia

Girrawheen Western Australia—Legislative Assembly
- Interactive map of district boundaries from the 2025 state election
- State: Western Australia
- Dates current: 1996–2021; 2025–
- MP: Meredith Hammat
- Party: Labor
- Namesake: Girrawheen
- Electors: 32,258 (2025)
- Area: 23 km^{2} (8.9 sq mi)
- Demographic: Metropolitan
- Coordinates: 33.36°S 115.66°E
Electorates around Girrawheen:
Kingsley	Landsdale	West Swan
Kingsley	Girrawheen	West Swan
Balcatta	Morley	Morley

Girrawheen is an electoral district of the Legislative Assembly in the Australian state of Western Australia from 1996 to 2021. It was recreated in 2025.

The district is based in Perth's northern suburbs. Politically, it is a safe Labor seat.

== Geography ==
Girrawheen was located in Perth's northern suburbs. It was bounded to the west by the Mitchell Freeway, to the south by the Reid Highway and to the east by Mirrabooka Avenue. Its northernmost boundary was Hepburn Avenue. The district included the suburbs of Girrawheen, Marangaroo, Balga, Warwick and a large section of Hamersley.

== History ==
Girrawheen was first created for the 1996 state election. It largely replaced the abolished district of Marangaroo. Subsequently, it was replaced by Landsdale in time for the 2021 state election. However, Girrawheen returned as an electorate at the 2025 Western Australian state election following a redistribution, largely as a replacement for Mirrabooka which was abolished.

== Members for Girrawheen ==
First incarnation (1996–2021)
Ted Cunningham	Labor	1996–2001
Margaret Quirk	Labor	2001–2021
Second incarnation (2025-present)
Meredith Hammat	Labor	2025–present

== Election results ==
2025 Western Australian state election: Girrawheen
Party	Candidate	Votes	%	±%
Labor	Meredith Hammat	12,915	52.2	−20.2
Liberal	Jacques Lombard	4,458	18.0	+7.7
Greens	Evan Beasley	2,940	11.9	+6.2
Legalise Cannabis	Nathan Kirk	2,229	9.0	+9.0
Christians	Tracey Purser	1,346	5.4	+2.5
Independent	Kim Mubarak	873	3.5	+2.7
Total formal votes		24,761	92.8	−0.4
Informal votes		1,935	7.2	+0.4
Turnout		26,696	82.8	+3.6
Two-party-preferred result
Labor	Meredith Hammat	17,649	71.3	−12.1
Liberal	Jacques Lombard	7,090	28.7	+12.1
Labor hold		Swing	−12.1	
