= Janine Freeman =

Former Western Australian politician

Member of the Western Australian Legislative Assembly for Mirrabooka
- In office 9 March 2013 – 29 January 2021
- Preceded by: District re-created
- Succeeded by: Meredith Hammat

Member of the Western Australian Legislative Assembly for Nollamara
- In office 6 September 2008 – 9 March 2013
- Preceded by: District re-created
- Succeeded by: District abolished

Personal details
- Born: 12 June 1965 (age 60) Osborne Park, Western Australia
- Party: Australian Labor Party
- Website: www.janinefreeman.com

Janine Marie Freeman (born 12 June 1965) is a former Western Australian politician.

Freeman was elected to the Western Australian Legislative Assembly for the newly created seat of Mirrabooka on 9 March 2013.

Freeman was first elected to the Western Australian Legislative Assembly for the new seat of Nollamara on 6 September 2008.

Freeman holds a Bachelor of Economics, a Graduate Diploma in Occupational Health and Safety and a Certificate IV in Financial Services (Superannuation). Freeman has spent her career representing working people and their families. From March 2005 to January 2007, Freeman was the Assistant State Secretary of UnionsWA. Freeman has been UnionsWA Assistant Secretary; a Senior Industrial Officer with the Liquor Hospitality and Miscellaneous Workers' Union now known as United Voice; a Member of the WA WorkCover Board, and Deputy Chair of the industry superannuation fund, HESTA.

In November 2020, Freeman announced she would retire from politics at the 2021 Western Australian state election.

Western Australian Legislative Assembly
New district	Member for Nollamara; 2008–2013	District abolished
New district	Member for Mirrabooka; 2013–2021	Succeeded by Meredith Hammat
