= Westminster, Western Australia =

Westminster
- Suburb
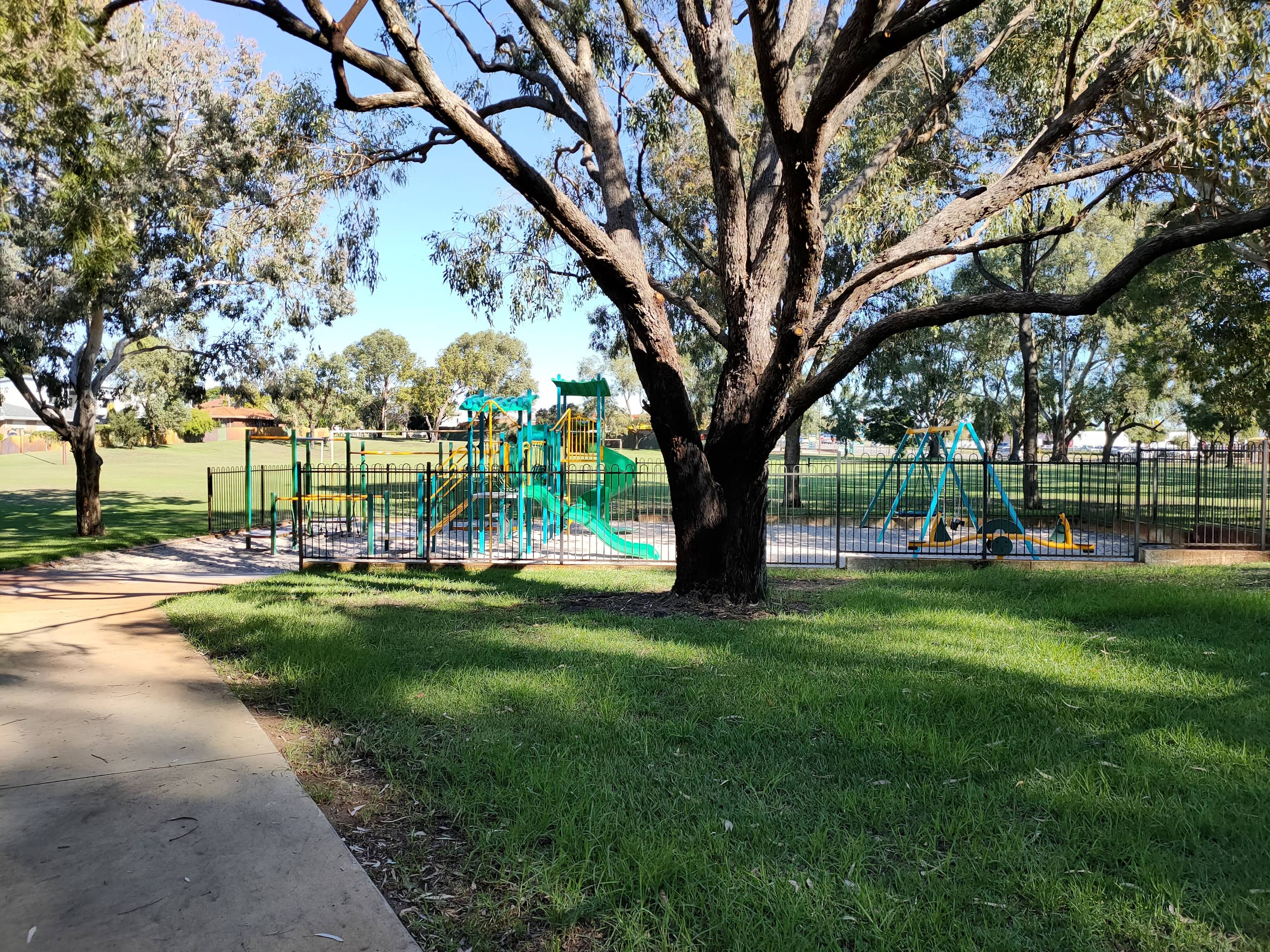
- Ted Cross Reserve, Westminster
- Interactive map of Westminster
- Coordinates: 31.87°S 115.838°E
- Country: Australia
- State: Western Australia
- City: Perth
- LGA: City of Stirling
- Location: 10 km (6.2 mi) N of Perth CBD; 8 km (5.0 mi) E of North Beach; 16 km (9.9 mi) NW of Perth Airport

Government
  - State electorate: Balcatta
  - Federal division: Cowan

Area
  - Total: 2.4 km^{2} (0.93 sq mi)

Population
  - Total: 7,042 (SAL 2021)
- Postcode: 6061
Suburbs around Westminster
Hamersley	Balga	Mirrabooka
Balcatta	Westminster	Mirrabooka
	Tuart Hill	Dianella

Westminster is a suburb approximately 10 kilometres (6.2 mi) north of Perth, Western Australia. Its local government area is the City of Stirling.

Westminster was formerly the southern part of Balga but was renamed in 1995 at the request of residents. This was the name of the original estate that existed before residential subdivision. Between 1936 and 1955, a limestone road named Westminster Boulevard passed through the area.

By 2035, Westminster’s population is forecast to reach 8,425 – a 9% increase, reflecting strong and steady growth. With an average age of 34, younger than the City average of 38, the suburb is home to a dynamic community: 75% of households are couple families, and 40% have children. 44% of homes are privately rented, supporting a flexible and varied housing mix.

Westminster is embracing a future built on its rich diversity, everyday accessibility, and reputation as an affordable and welcoming suburb.

Westminster is served by Stirling Central Shopping Centre. The area is home to public and private primary schools and also contains a number of recreational areas including Ted Cross Reserve, Matt Williams Reserve and Margaret Coyle Reserve which is home to the Westminster Community Food Garden.

The suburbs close proximity to Balcatta industrial area and easy access to Reid Highway, Wanneroo Road and Main Street makes Westminster's location desirable for residents. Westminster has easy access to North Beach from Reid Highway which is only 8 km away. The Perth CBD and Northbridge district is a mere 9 km away using Wanneroo Road as a direct route.

Regular bus services serve Westminster along Wanneroo Road and through the middle of the suburb. Westminster has two schools, Westminster Primary School and St Gerard’s Primary School .

The suburb is served by a number of Transperth bus routes operated by Path Transit and Swan Transit – including the 371, 375, 386 and 415 routes.

== Areas of interest ==
=== Westminster Community Food Garden ===
This garden has 15 veggie beds, a native habitat pond and a large mulberry tree. It is free to join and run by a small but enthusiastic group of residents. A nature play area is currently being developed. It is located at Margaret Coyle Reserve on the corner of Lindfield and Balcombe Street.

== Transport ==
=== Bus ===
- 371 Mirrabooka Bus Station to Flinders Square – serves Ravenswood Drive
- 975 Warwick Station to Bayswater Station – serves Ravenswood Drive, Marloo Road, it is serving for st gerard's primary school and Princess Road
- 374 Mirrabooka Bus Station to Whitfords Station – serve Mirrabooka Avenue
- 375 Mirrabooka Bus Station to Alexander Heights Shopping Centre – serves Ravenswood Drive, Majella Road and Arkana Road
- 384 Mirrabooka Bus Station to Perth Busport – serves Ravenswood Drive
- 386X Perth Busport to Kingsway City (limited stops) – serves Amelia Street, Marloo Road and Princess Road
- 386 Perth Busport to Kingsway City – serves Amelia Street, Marloo Road and Princess Road
- 388 Perth Busport to Warwick Station – serve Wanneroo Road
- 389 Perth Busport to Wanneroo – serves Wanneroo Road
- 415 Mirrabooka Bus Station to Stirling Station – serves Ravenswood Drive and Amelia Street
