= Electoral results for the district of Willagee =

Electoral District of Willagee in Western Australia electoral results

This is a list of electoral results for the electoral district of Willagee in Western Australian state elections.

== Members for Willagee ==
Member	Party	Term
Alan Carpenter	Labor	1996–2009
Peter Tinley	Labor	2009–present

== Election results ==
=== Elections in the 2020s ===
2021 Western Australian state election: Willagee
Party	Candidate	Votes	%	±%
Labor	Peter Tinley	15,576	66.1	+11.3
Liberal	Barry Jones	4,525	19.2	−9.3
Greens	Felicity Townsend	2,197	9.3	−1.9
No Mandatory Vaccination	Susan Poole	507	2.2	+2.2
One Nation	Mark Dalrymple	434	1.8	+1.8
Liberal Democrats	Michael Mitchell	310	1.3	+1.3
Total formal votes		23,549	96.3	+1.1
Informal votes		906	3.7	−1.1
Turnout		24,455	86.1	−2.8
Two-party-preferred result
Labor	Peter Tinley	18,156	77.1	+9.5
Liberal	Barry Jones	5,387	22.9	−9.5
Labor hold		Swing	+9.5	

=== Elections in the 2010s ===
2017 Western Australian state election: Willagee
Party	Candidate	Votes	%	±%
Labor	Peter Tinley	11,229	52.7	+9.8
Liberal	Rebecca Aubrey	6,547	30.7	−13.2
Greens	Felicity McGeorge	2,470	11.6	+0.7
Christians	Robin Hosking	514	2.4	+2.4
Micro Business	Paul Potter	334	1.6	+1.6
Socialist Alliance	Corina Abraham	212	1.0	+1.0
Total formal votes		21,306	95.7	+2.1
Informal votes		957	4.3	−2.1
Turnout		22,263	88.5	−2.1
Two-party-preferred result
Labor	Peter Tinley	13,948	65.5	+13.0
Liberal	Rebecca Aubrey	7,351	34.5	−13.0
Labor hold		Swing	+13.0	

2013 Western Australian state election: Willagee
Party	Candidate	Votes	%	±%
Labor	Peter Tinley	9,280	46.5	–5.6
Liberal	Samuel Piipponen	7,097	35.6	+5.7
Greens	Alisha Ryans-Taylor	2,634	13.2	–4.1
	Sam Wainwright	397	2.0	+2.0
Independent	Teresa van Lieshout	361	1.8	+1.8
Independent	Wayne Shortland	181	0.9	+0.9
Total formal votes		19,950	93.3	+0.3
Informal votes		1,431	6.7	−0.3
Turnout		21,381	89.5	
Two-party-preferred result
Labor	Peter Tinley	12,080	60.6	–4.5
Liberal	Samuel Piipponen	7,856	39.4	+4.5
Labor hold		Swing	–4.5	

=== Elections in the 2000s ===
2009 Willagee state by-election
Party	Candidate	Votes	%	±%
Labor	Peter Tinley	9,160	53.80	+2.15
Greens	Hsien Harper	5,162	30.32	+12.90
Independent	Gerry Georgatos	1,529	8.98	+8.98
Christian Democrats	Henri Chew	1,175	6.90	+6.90
Total formal votes		17,026	95.48	+1.87
Informal votes		863	4.82	−1.87
Turnout		17,889	77.50	−8.62
Two-candidate-preferred result
Labor	Peter Tinley	10,316	60.61	−3.97
Greens	Hsien Harper	6,664	39.39	+39.39
Labor hold		Swing	N/A	

2008 Western Australian state election: Willagee
Party	Candidate	Votes	%	±%
Labor	Alan Carpenter	9,718	51.7	+3.6
Liberal	Matt Taylor	5,820	30.9	+5.6
Greens	Robert Delves	3,277	17.4	+8.4
Total formal votes		18,815	93.3	+0.6
Informal votes		1,350	6.7	−0.6
Turnout		20,165	86.1	
Two-party-preferred result
Labor	Alan Carpenter	12,150	64.6	+0.9
Liberal	Matt Taylor	6,664	35.4	−0.9
Labor hold		Swing	+0.9	

2005 Western Australian state election: Willagee
Party	Candidate	Votes	%	±%
Labor	Alan Carpenter	10,897	51.7	−5.0
Liberal	Bob Smith	5,080	24.1	+2.5
Greens	Hsien Harper	1,839	8.7	−2.2
Independent	Trish Phelan	1,003	4.8	+4.8
Independent	Andrew Sullivan	657	3.1	+3.1
Christian Democrats	Rosemary Lorrimar	645	3.1	+3.1
Family First	Paul Byrnes	628	3.0	+3.0
One Nation	Bill Cook	310	1.5	−5.9
Total formal votes		21,059	91.8	−3.1
Informal votes		1,885	8.2	+3.1
Turnout		22,944	89.9	
Two-party-preferred result
Labor	Alan Carpenter	13,968	66.4	−4.7
Liberal	Bob Smith	7,073	33.6	+4.7
Labor hold		Swing	−4.7	

2001 Western Australian state election: Willagee
Party	Candidate	Votes	%	±%
Labor	Alan Carpenter	10,878	52.7	+2.6
Liberal	Nerina Lewis	5,535	26.8	−9.9
Greens	Diannah Johnston	2,064	10.0	+1.3
One Nation	Warren Higgs	1,517	7.3	+7.3
Democrats	Florence Evans	662	3.2	−1.3
Total formal votes		20,656	95.2	0.0
Informal votes		1,046	4.8	0.0
Turnout		21,702	91.0	
Two-party-preferred result
Labor	Alan Carpenter	13,499	65.7	+6.9
Liberal	Nerina Lewis	7,032	34.3	−6.9
Labor hold		Swing	+6.9	

=== Elections in the 1990s ===
1996 Western Australian state election: Willagee
Party	Candidate	Votes	%	±%
Labor	Alan Carpenter	10,186	50.1	+4.4
Liberal	Tony Seman	7,466	36.7	−6.6
Greens	Eddie Speed	1,765	8.7	+4.9
Democrats	Ilse Trewin	915	4.5	+1.3
Total formal votes		20,332	95.2	+0.4
Informal votes		1,025	4.8	−0.4
Turnout		21,357	91.3	
Two-party-preferred result
Labor	Alan Carpenter	11,919	58.8	+6.8
Liberal	Tony Seman	8,367	41.2	−6.8
Labor hold		Swing	+6.8	
