= Eastlink =

Eastlink may refer to:

- Eastlink (company), a communications provider in Canada
  - Eastlink Community TV, the brand for EastLink's community channels
  - Eastlink Wireless, a mobile network operator owned by Eastlink
- East-Link (Dublin), a toll bridge in Dublin, Ireland
- EastLink, Melbourne, a toll road in Melbourne, Australia
- Eastlink Centre, an arena and convention facility in Charlottetown, Prince Edward Island, Canada
- East Link Extension, a light rail line serving the Eastside region of the Seattle metropolitan area in the U.S. state of Washington
- Eastlink hotel, a sculpture by Callum Morton in Melbourne, Australia
- East Link (Sweden), a planned high-speed railway in Sweden
- EastLink Trail, a shared use cyclist/pedestrian path in Melbourne, Australia
- EastLink WA, proposed road in Perth, Western Australia

== See also ==
- East Tangential Link or Tangentiale Verbindung Ost, an expressway in Berlin, Germany
- East-West Link (disambiguation)
- East Line (disambiguation)
