= Beeliar =

Beeliar may refer to:

- the Beeliar people, a defunct group of Indigenous Australians from the area of Perth, Western Australia;
- Beeliar, Western Australia, a suburb of Perth;
- Beeliar Wetlands, two chains of lakes and wetlands running north–south through the southern suburbs of Perth.
