= Perth Freight Link =

Perth Freight Link Western Australia

General information
- Type: Freeway (Proposed)
- Length: 13.4 km (8.3 mi)

Major junctions
- Southeast end: Kwinana Freeway (State Route 2/National Route 1); Roe Highway (State Route 3), Bibra Lake
- Northwest end: Stirling Highway (State Route 5), Fremantle

Highway system
- Highways in Australia; National Highway • Freeways in Australia; Highways in Western Australia

The Perth Freight Link was a proposed $1.9 billion project in Perth, Western Australia to improve the road freight link between Kewdale and Fremantle Harbour. The project was announced by the state government in May 2014, but was cancelled following a change of government at the March 2017 state election.

The proposal included multiple stages: a five-kilometre (3.1 mi) extension of Roe Highway to Stock Road (Roe 8); a second stage linking Roe 8 to Stirling Highway, bypassing fourteen sets of traffic signals (Roe 9); and a final stage connecting into the Port of Fremantle. The plan included mandatory GPS tracking of all vehicles over an undisclosed size or weight with a charge per kilometre being applied for vehicles travelling along the route between Muchea and North Fremantle. The extension would have taken the highway from its current terminus at Kwinana Freeway approximately five kilometres (3.1 mi) further west through the Beeliar Wetlands to Stock Road, near Forrest Road in Coolbellup. The proposed route was along or within the vicinity of an existing road reserve in the Perth Metropolitan Region Scheme.

The project's environmental assessment by the Environmental Protection Authority (EPA) along with the approval of the development by WA Government Minister Albert Jacob was ruled invalid by the Chief Justice of the Supreme Court on 16 December 2015. On 30 March 2016 Greg McIntyre QC, acting for Corina Abraham, lodged writs in the Supreme Court of Western Australia, alleging that Minister of Aboriginal Affairs Peter Collier and the Department of Aboriginal Affairs cultural committee denied procedural fairness when it failed to consult her. On 24 August 2016 the Supreme Court dismissed Abraham's challenge. The Save Beeliar Wetlands group tried to challenge the highway in the High Court, but the court dismissed the challenge on 16 December 2016, saying there wasn't sufficient grounds for a challenge.

Construction began in late 2016, following the signing of the contract to build Roe 8 by the Liberal state government. Opposition to the project continued, with protests and a second senate inquiry. The freight link was an election issue in the 2017 state election. The McGowan Government scrapped the entire project after winning office.

== History ==
=== Background ===
Roe Highway was first proposed in 1955 by Gordon Stephenson as part of what was to become the Metropolitan Region Planning Scheme. The highway was intended to form the southern and eastern sections of a ring route around the Perth metropolitan area. In the 1950s, Stephenson planned for Roe Highway to continue westwards towards Fremantle, through South Fremantle along Marine Terrace and then north to connect with Stirling Highway and the Port of Fremantle. As part of the plan, in 1974 Stirling Highway was extended from its then terminus north of the Swan River southwards to Canning Highway. Over a period of approximately 20 years, Main Roads Western Australia procured land, and in 1985, Stirling Highway was extended southwards from Canning Highway to High Street (the western continuation of Leach Highway). The remaining 3 km strip of land south of High Street then became known as the Fremantle Eastern Bypass.

At the southern end of the proposed Fremantle Eastern Bypass, an 8 km east–west road reservation was proclaimed, and became known as Roe Highway stage 8. With a change of state governments in 2001, the planned Fremantle Eastern Bypass / Roe Highway stage 8 was cancelled, and the land reserved for the Fremantle Eastern Bypass portion was sold for housing. As part of the funding arrangement for Roe Highway stages 6 and 7, the federal government stipulated that the reservation for Roe Highway stage 8 itself was to be retained.

Following a change in state governments in September 2008, planning work commenced on an extension of the Roe Highway from Kwinana Freeway to Stock Road. Planning was also under way for an upgrade of High Street to dual carriageway between Stirling Highway and Carrington Street.

=== Project announced ===
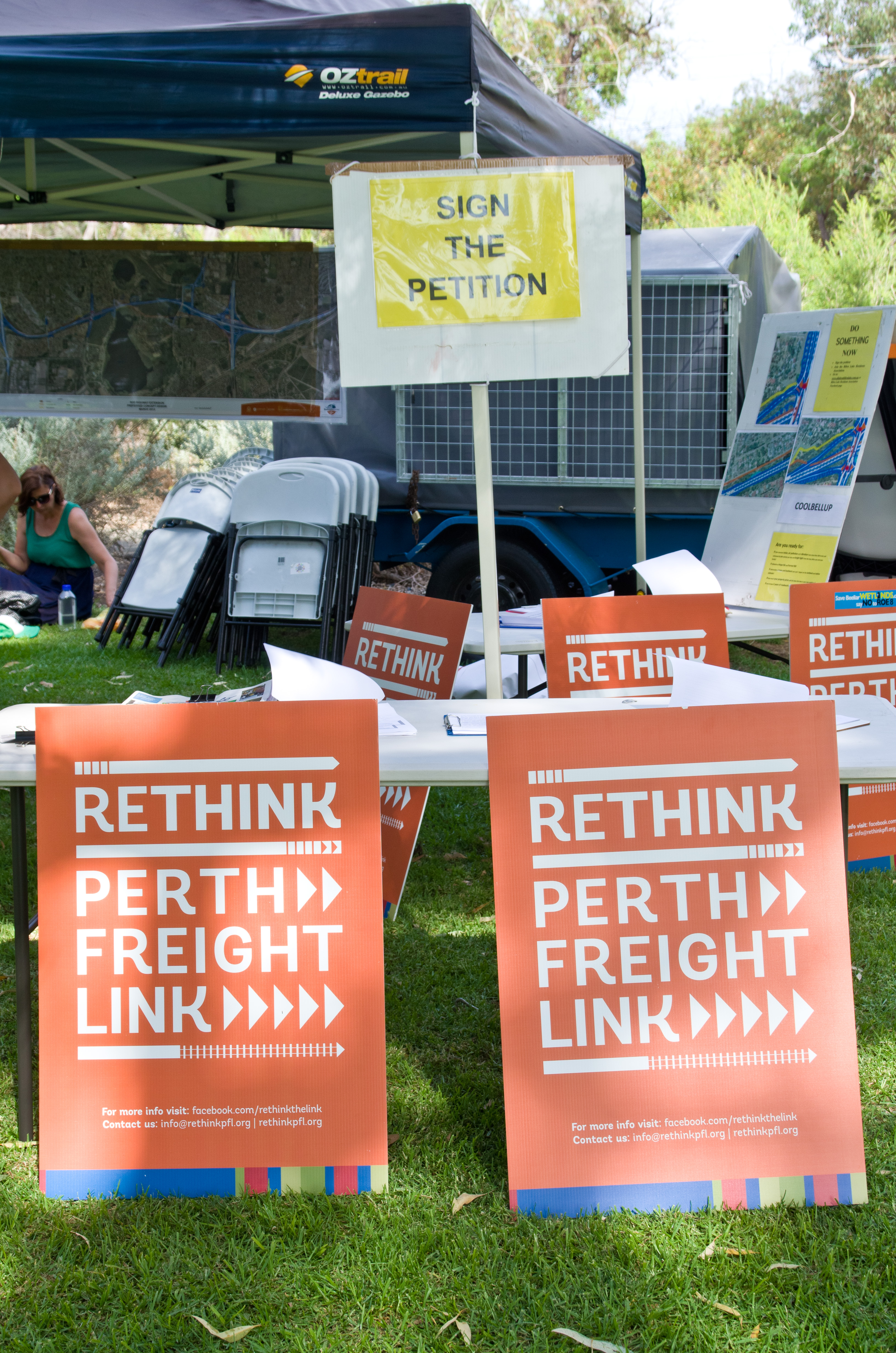
Rethink the Link protest signs against the Perth Freight Link, 2015

The Perth Freight Link project was announced in May 2014, with joint funding between the state and federal governments. The announcement included plans for a toll on the route, which would only apply to trucks. In December 2014, the state government revealed that they planned to construct the Freight Link between early 2016 and 2019, and that the toll would apply on the 85-kilometre-long (53 mi) truck route between Muchea (north of Perth) and Fremantle, once the link was completed.

Uncertainty over the project's scope and time frame emerged in mid-2015. The intended route for the second stage, which was necessitated by the earlier sale of the Fremantle Eastern Bypass land that was previously planned to be used for the route, faced community opposition as it would require residential properties to be compulsorily acquired and demolished. As such, alternative routes for the second stage were considered by the government. The uncertainty over stage 2 remained for over a year. In September 2016, there still was not a decision on the stage's timing, nor its route, but a tunnel was considered by Barnett as the most likely option. A tunnel under White Gum Valley, Beaconsfield and Hilton was committed to on 15 January 2017.

=== Controversies ===
The project is controversial, and has been the subject of concern and protest from multiple community groups on various issues. The main areas of contention relate to environmental issues, as well as the cost and justification for the project.

The state government claims the project is needed to reduce congestion in Perth's south and enhance road safety, and would be required for any future port development in the vicinity. The necessity is disputed by opponents of the Freight Link, including the opposition Labor party and the Greens; McGowan has called it a "road to nowhere" and "waste of money". A 2015 report from Infrastructure Australia concluded that, while there would be economic benefit, the project was hurriedly prepared, and detailed assessments were not completed for alternatives. In 2016, a Senate inquiry unanimously denounced the Freight Link, and suggested the federal government redirect funding to a new outer harbour at Cockburn Sound proposed by the City of Kwinana.

The route of the Roe 8 section takes it through the Beeliar Wetlands, a habitat for the endangered Carnaby's black cockatoo. The Environmental Protection Authority (EPA) approved the Roe Highway extension in 2013, following a review that included over 3,000 public submissions, and Environment Minister Albert Jacob confirmed his approval on 2 July 2015. Preliminary site works began on the project during November 2015, which drew protests with many people being given move-on orders preventing them from being in the area.

As well as environmental issues with the extension of Roe Highway, Stephen Marley, president of the Livestock and Rural Transport Association of Western Australia, expressed concern in December 2014 that the cost of the truck toll will be passed on to farmers, and in May 2015, Palmyra residents protested the proposed compulsory acquisition and demolition of their homes to make way for Stage 2 of the link. Local people are opposed to the proposed route through the Bibra Lake area, including the local indigenous people, who described the area as a birthing place, the "King Edward Memorial Hospital for aboriginal people". The WA Road Transport Association has been critical of the November 2015 decision to postpone stage two of the project, as "Roe 8 alone delivers none of the productivity benefits promised by the full freight link to the port". They would not support a toll if implemented before the link to the port was completed. Such a toll was a prospect put forward by Barnett that month, though this was contradicted by Transport Minister Dean Nalder.

=== Legal challenges ===
In September 2015 the group Save the Beeliar Wetlands took legal action against the EPA, arguing that the authority did not follow its own policies. The project's environmental assessment by the EPA along with the approval of the development by WA Government Minister Albert Jacob was ruled invalid by the Chief Justice of the Supreme Court on 16 December 2015. The state government appealed, and the ruling was unanimously overturned by the Court of Appeal on 15 July 2016, as the EPA's policies were "not mandatory considerations". The Save Beeliar Wetlands group tried to challenge the highway in the High Court, but the court dismissed the challenge on 16 December 2016, saying there were not sufficient grounds for a challenge.

On 30 March 2016 Greg McIntyre QC, acting for Corina Abraham, lodged writs in the Supreme Court of Western Australia, alleging that Minister of Aboriginal Affairs Peter Collier and the Department of Aboriginal Affairs cultural committee denied procedural fairness when it failed to consult her. On 24 August 2016 the Supreme Court dismissed Abraham's challenge.

=== Commencement of construction works ===
The contract to build Roe 8 was approved and signed by state government in October 2016. There had been ongoing protests since construction activities commenced, including on 6 December 2016, the day after temporary fencing was erected.

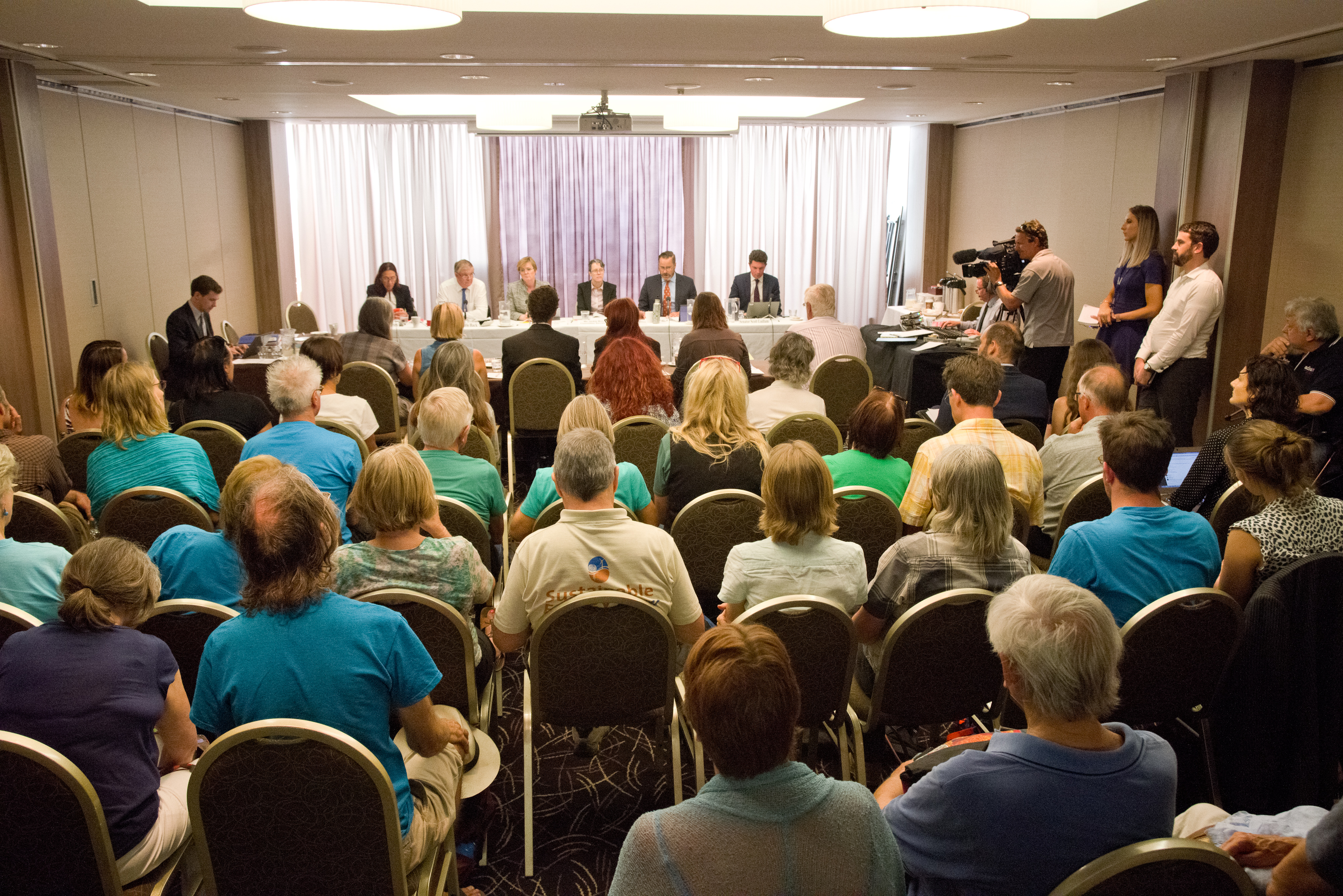
The 23 February 2017 public Senate Committee hearing

A public Senate Committee hearing was held on 23 February 2017, regarding the Roe 8 project's alleged failure to adhere to Federal environmental conditions. State Environment Minister Albert Jacob denied the allegations.

=== State election and aftermath ===
During the 2017 state election, the incoming McGowan Government stated it intended to scrap the entire project. On 12 March, Main Roads and the contractors agreed to suspend work on the project.

As part of cancellation negotiations with the federal government, Roe Highway was instead curtailed to curve northwards to connect to Murdoch Drive. This has been criticised as allowing for the future construction of Roe 8. Despite the cancellation, funding provisions for the project remained in the federal budget until a change of government in 2022.

== Route ==
The Perth Freight Link was proposed to connect the terminus of Roe Highway (at the Kwinana Freeway) with the Port of Fremantle. In conjunction with existing highways and the Gateway WA and NorthLink WA projects, the Freight Link would have formed part of an 85-kilometre (53 mi) free-flowing route between Muchea and the port.

=== Stage 1 (Roe 8) ===
Section 1, also known as Roe 8, was to be a five-kilometre (3.1 mi) extension to Roe Highway, from the Kwinana Freeway to Stock Road, cutting through a portion of the Beeliar Wetlands.

=== Stage 2 (Roe 9) ===
External images
- Stage 2 options
- Original design: upgrade Stock Road, Leach Highway, High Street (source: ABC News)
- May 2015: extend Roe Highway to Hamilton Hill, then tunnel north to High Street (source: Perth Now)
- May 2016: tunnel from Stock Road/Winterfield Road intersection to High Street (source: WA Today)

Stage 2 (Roe 9) would have linked the Roe 8 extension to East Fremantle. The original route considered was via Stock Road, Leach Highway, and High Street, upgraded with grade-separated interchanges, bypassing fourteen sets of traffic signals. Following community opposition to the plan, which would require residential properties to be compulsorily acquired and the demolition of homes, alternative routes were considered by the government. As of November 2015, the second stage had been postponed indefinitely, due to the intricacies and costs involved. In January 2017 Premier Colin Barnett announced a tunnel from Stock Road to High Street in East Fremantle 3 km short of the port, including crossing of the Swan River. The tunnel plan was revealed to cost at least $5.8b by documents that Main Roads had fought to prevent being released under a Freedom of Information request. An additional $2.7b would be needed to cross the Swan River. This option would impact the suburbs of Leighton and Mosman Park and see an increase in truck traffic to the north through Cottesloe.

=== Stage 3 (Roe 10) ===
A third stage would have seen the link cross the Swan River and connect into the port. There were no proposals made for the design, cost, or timing of this final section.

=== Roe Highway widening ===
Another section involved upgrading Roe Highway between Tonkin Highway and Orrong Road, adding a third lane in each direction and constructing a new bridge across the freight railway.

== See also ==
- Freeways in Australia
- East West Link, a similar project proposed in Melbourne which was also cancelled due to a change in government
- WestConnex, a similar project in Sydney
- Wilman Wadandi Highway, a ring road around Bunbury, also controversial for environmental reasons
