= Gerry Georgatos =

Australian researcher and social justice campaigner (born 1962)

Gerry Georgatos (Greek: Γεράσιμος Γεωργάτος; born 1962) is a university researcher and social justice and human rights campaigner based in Western Australia. He has campaigned for prison reform, as well as championing the rights of the impoverished and marginalised and the homeless.

== Early life ==
Gerry Georgatos was born in 1962.

== Research career ==
Georgatos has been a researcher with the University of Western Australia, with his work focusing especially on social justice issues among Aboriginal and Torres Strait Islander people.

=== Suicide prevention ===
Georgatos is a researcher in suicide prevention, particularly among Aboriginal and Torres Strait Islander people. He has done extensive research into Aboriginal incarceration, suicide and deaths in custody, and worked on the Aboriginal and Torres Strait Islander Suicide Prevention Evaluation Project. In November 2013, he reported in The Australian that Australia's Aboriginal people are dying of suicide at among the highest rates in the world. His research found that 1 in 12 of all Aboriginal deaths were by suicide.

Georgatos at government levels and through the national media has campaigned for a response to what he describes of the high rates of suicides as "a humanitarian crisis" and as "racialised" and "racism".

Georgatos' research found that Australia jails Aboriginal people at among the highest rates in the world. In October 2014 he stated on a national television program that one in 13 of Western Australia's Aboriginal adult males are in prison. His research reported that from a racialised lens this is the highest jailing rate in the world.

In January 2017, he helped establish the suicide postvention Federal Government taskforce, the National Indigenous Critical Response Service, and he was the inaugural national coordinator of the taskforce till he stepped down May 2019.

He presently leads the suicide prevention focused National Critical Response Trauma Recovery Project.

In 2021, Georgatos and the National Suicide Prevention & Trauma Recovery Project were instrumental in launching a Class Action by people incarcerated and formerly incarcerated in Western Australia's only Juvenile Detention correctional centre, Banksia Hill Juvenile Detention Centre. It is the largest Class Action of its type.

== Human rights advocacy ==
Georgatos has also advocated for human rights in several areas, including prison reform, the impoverished, homeless, and other marginalised people.

He founded Students Without Borders at Monash University. Georgatos also launched Students Without Borders at Murdoch University and developed the statewide 8Ball recycling program which students and volunteers refurbished computers and Georgatos donated the computers right throughout Western Australia and to developing nations. Students Without Borders and Georgatos won awards in the 2008 Western Australian Community Service Awards, with Georgatos winning the individual category, WA Community Award for Outstanding Individual Contribution. He was a former Murdoch University Guild President and also sat on the university's peak academic planning body and for four years on its board of directors (The Senate).

Georgatos was significant in campaigning for the release of Indonesian minors from Australian adult prisons. After he blew the whistle he was banned without explanation from visiting prisons. He campaigned for the release of what he argued were up to 100 Indonesian minors languishing in prisons.

During March and April 2015 Georgatos campaigned publicly for a 25-year-old asylum seeker from Iran, Saeed Hassanloo. Hassanloo's hunger strike had been kept from the Australian media for 35 days. Georgatos said that if Hassanloo died he would be Australia's first hunger strike death and called on the prime minister to intervene.

He was instrumental in advocating for and brokering the rollout of the "life-saving" Custody Notification Service in Western Australia and the Northern Territory.

=== Homelessness ===
Georgatos has worked extensively with homelessness. For years he argued that homelessness is worse than realised in the Kimberley region of Australia. His research reports that seven per cent of the Kimberley is homeless in some form. He said that nearly all the homeless people are Aboriginal.

Georgatos has launched campaigns to house large homeless families, such as the campaign for Homeless Friendly Precincts in July 2015.

In 2020, during hard border COVID-19 lockdowns in Western Australia, Georgatos condemned the Western Australian Government for failing to accommodate and protect the street homeless. He led the National Suicide Prevention and Trauma Recovery Service to accommodate as many street homeless as possible during the lockdowns, which succeeded in accommodating twice as many street homeless as the state government.

== Other activities ==
=== Journalism ===
Georgatos has won awards for his investigative journalism. However, Georgatos has never been a career journalist and "forayed" for three years only into journalism, using the opportunity significantly to raise awareness of social justice crises, particularly of suicide crises. He has published investigative reports with several publications, including the National Indigenous Times, the National Indigenous Radio Service and The Stringer. In 2013, Georgatos was the recipient of Journalist of the Year at the Multicultural Media Awards. He was described as a "conspiracy theorist" for advocating the innocence of Schapelle Corby, who was convicted of drug smuggling in Indonesia.

=== Politics ===
Georgatos was initially endorsed as the Greens candidate for an anticipated 2009 by-election for the seat of Willagee in the Western Australian Legislative Assembly, but given that former premier Alan Carpenter waited longer than expected to resign, the preselection was later re-opened and Georgatos was defeated by Hsien Harper. He then ran as an independent, winning 9% of the vote, and declared his intention of forming a rival Greens party.

In 2013 Georgatos was endorsed as the lead Wikileaks Party candidate for Western Australia in the Senate. He was embroiled in controversy for using Australia's preferential voting system to direct votes towards the centre-right National Party ahead of Scott Ludlam of the progressive Australian Greens. The preference deal was said to alienate Wikileaks Party supporters. Georgatos said the decision was made because of his admiration for the Nationals' Indigenous candidate David Wirrpanda, rather than for the National Party. Georgatos claimed that his effective first preference was always Ludlam and that Wirrpanda was not a threat but that Georgatos wanted to send a message to all political parties to elect into parliament more Indigenous candidates. He was initially endorsed for the 2014 special election following the voiding of the Western Australian Senate result after the Australian Electoral Commission ruled Julian Assange ineligible to contest. He withdrew from the contest shortly after citing personal reasons.

=== Wheelchairs for Kids ===
Georgatos has had an association with Wheelchairs for Kids and pro bono headed the foundation arm of the charity, raising funds for rough terrain children's wheelchairs to be donated around the world. As of 2013 the charity operated a factory with around 100 volunteer workers on a typical day. It manufactures wheelchairs and sends them to children in impoverished countries. In that year, it donated around 25,000 wheelchairs to children in over 60 countries.
