= Corina Abraham =

Aboriginal activist

Corina Patricia Abraham
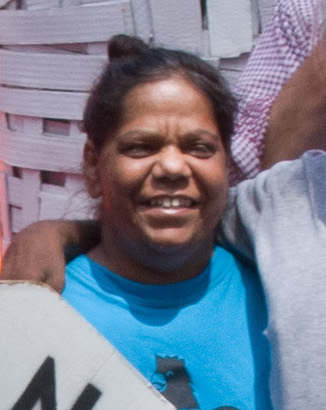
- Abraham at a protest at Bibra Lake.
- Known for: Activist

Corina Patricia Abraham is a Whadjuk Noongar woman. In 2016, she challenged the Western Australian Government for failure in procedural fairness during its change to the Aboriginal Heritage status of the land to be impacted by the extension to Roe Highway known as Roe 8.

== Personal life ==
Abraham is a custodian of the Whadjuk Noongar people descended from the Beeliar Whudjuk Noongar tribe. She traces her family back many generations, and is directly related to Calyute, one of the few survivors of the Pinjarra massacre. Her grandfather is Reverend Sealin Garlett.

In 1997 Abraham, along with a number of other indigenous artists of the Djidij Djidji Arts Group, created a piece of artwork using linocut print, which is part of the City of Melville's art collection.

In 2010 Abraham was co-chair of the City of Cockburn Aboriginal Advisory committee.

Abraham was the Socialist Alliance candidate for the electoral district of Willagee in the 2017 Western Australian state election.

Abraham has type 2 diabetes.

== Opposition to Roe 8 ==
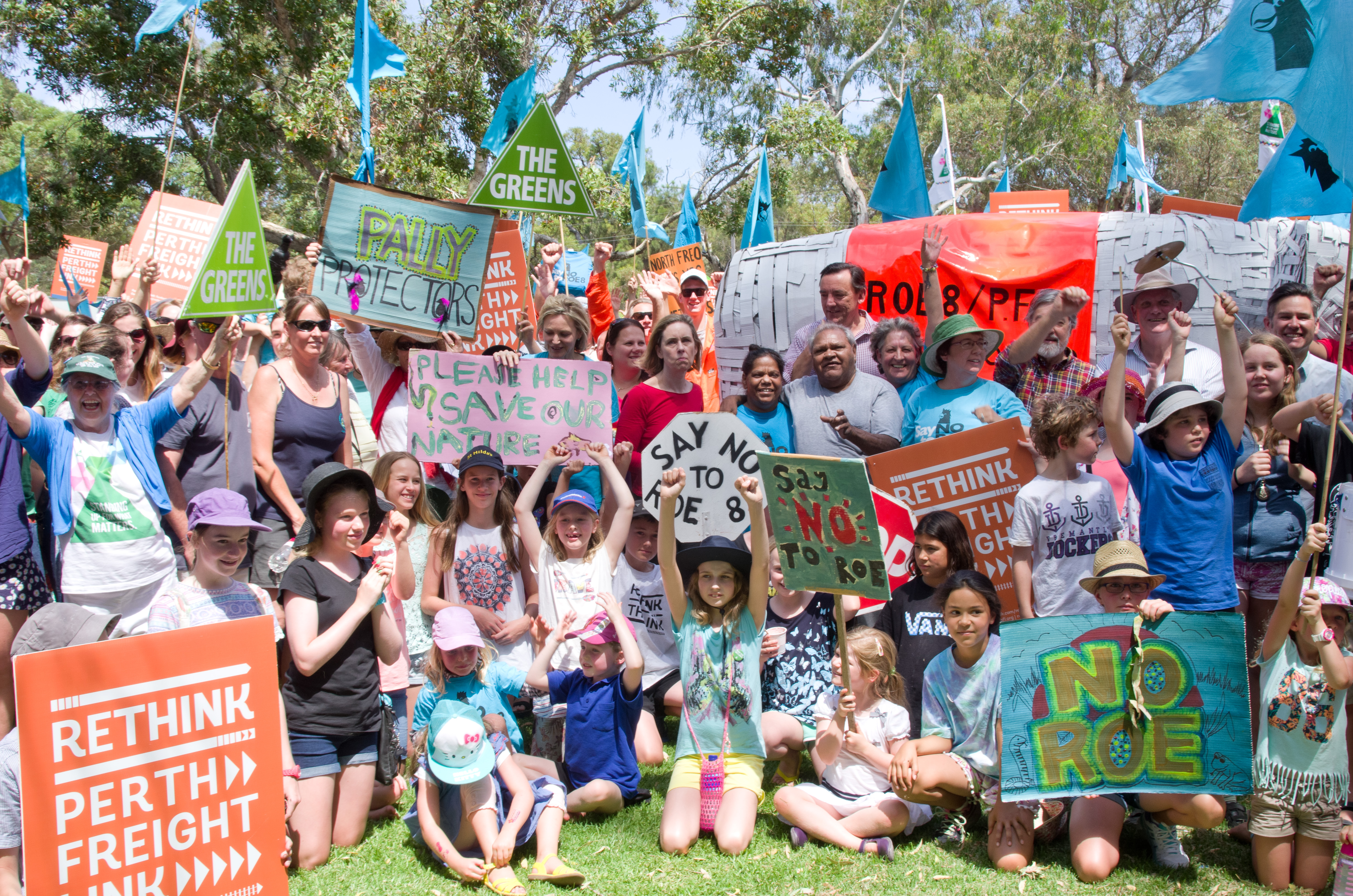
Protestors at Bibra Lake, 22 November 2015. Abraham is wearing a blue shirt; she is in the centre of this photo behind the white sign with "Say no to Roe 8".

In May 2014 the Barnett Government announced that the Perth Freight Link would go ahead; there had already been considerable concern over the plan's first section, an extension to Roe Highway known as Roe 8, that would run through the Beeliar Wetlands.

Abraham has publicly opposed the Roe 8 extension.

On 2 December 2015 Senator Scott Ludlam read a letter to the Australian Senate, written by Abraham to the Prime Minister of Australia about the Perth Freight link, in particular the area to be impacted by Roe 8. The letter is a plea to the newly appointed Prime Minister Malcolm Turnbull for intervention, in which she describes the cultural and historical significance of the wetlands to the Noongar people. She also expresses her concern about the removal of sites from the Department of Aboriginal Affairs registry and the West Australian Government's "manipulating, disrespect and lack of cultural respect to the ... Beelier Whadjuk Noongars".

=== WA Supreme Court writs ===
On 30 March 2016 Greg McIntyre QC (the lawyer who also commenced the Mabo case), acting pro bono for Abraham, lodged writs in the Supreme Court of Western Australia. The writs alleged that Minister of Aboriginal Affairs Peter Collier and the Department of Aboriginal Affairs cultural committee denied procedural fairness to Abraham when it failed to consult her. The failure occurred because Abraham was a party to original consultation that recognised the significance of the area. On 24 August 2016 the Supreme Court dismissed Abraham's challenge.
