= East-West Link =

East-West Link may refer to:

- East West Link (Melbourne)
- East-West Link (Suriname)
- East-West Link, Brisbane
- East–West Link Expressway, in Malaysia
- East West Rail, in England

== See also ==
- Eastlink (disambiguation)
- Westlink (disambiguation)
