= Georgatos =

Georgatos is a Greek surname. It may refer to:

- Angelos Georgatos, mayor of Athens during the years of the Hellenic State (1941–1944)
- Gerry Georgatos (born 1962), Australian researcher and social justice advocate
- Grigoris Georgatos (born 1972), retired Greek footballer
