= Homeless Friendly Precincts =

Homeless Friendly Precincts are a minimum standard that is being campaigned for by advocates of the homeless. Homeless Friendly Precincts are the brainchild of social justice campaigner Gerry Georgatos. Georgatos has described Homeless Friendly Precincts as "a sliver of human dignity for the homeless" where the major hubs of homelessness in major cities and towns throughout Australia should have a 24/7 precinct for the homeless of showers, laundries, small storage facilities, treatment and rest areas and sleeping areas.
