= Westlink =

Westlink, West Link or West-link may refer to:

== Road and rail infrastructure ==
- West Link, a planned railway tunnel under central Gothenburg, Sweden
- West-Link, a toll bridge on the M50 motorway outside of Dublin, Ireland
- Westlink (road), a dual-carriageway throughpass in Belfast, Northern Ireland
- Westlink M7, an urban freeway connecting the northern and southern suburbs of Sydney, Australia
- City West Link, a link road in Sydney, Australia

== Public transport ==
- WESTlink (on-demand bus), a demand-responsive bus service in southwest England
- Westlink, a brand name used by the airline SAS Commuter in Norway
- Westlink (bus company), a former London bus company bought by London United Busways in 1995
- Victa Westlink Rail, a defunct railway company based in Derby, England

== Locations ==
- Westlink, Wichita, Kansas, a neighborhood in Wichita, Kansas, U.S.
- Westlink Tower, one of the tallest buildings in Switzerland

== Broadcasting ==
- Westlink (Australian TV channel), a former government TV channel based in Western Australia
- WestLink, a satellite service operated by KNME-TV in Albuquerque, New Mexico, U.S.

== See also ==
- East-West Link (disambiguation)
- Western Link (disambiguation)
