= Wheelchairs for Kids =

Rough terrain charity

Wheelchairs For Kids Australia is an Australian charity organisation that builds and provides wheelchairs to children in more than 80 countries. The wheelchairs provided adhere to durability guidelines from the World Health Organization (WHO).

== History ==
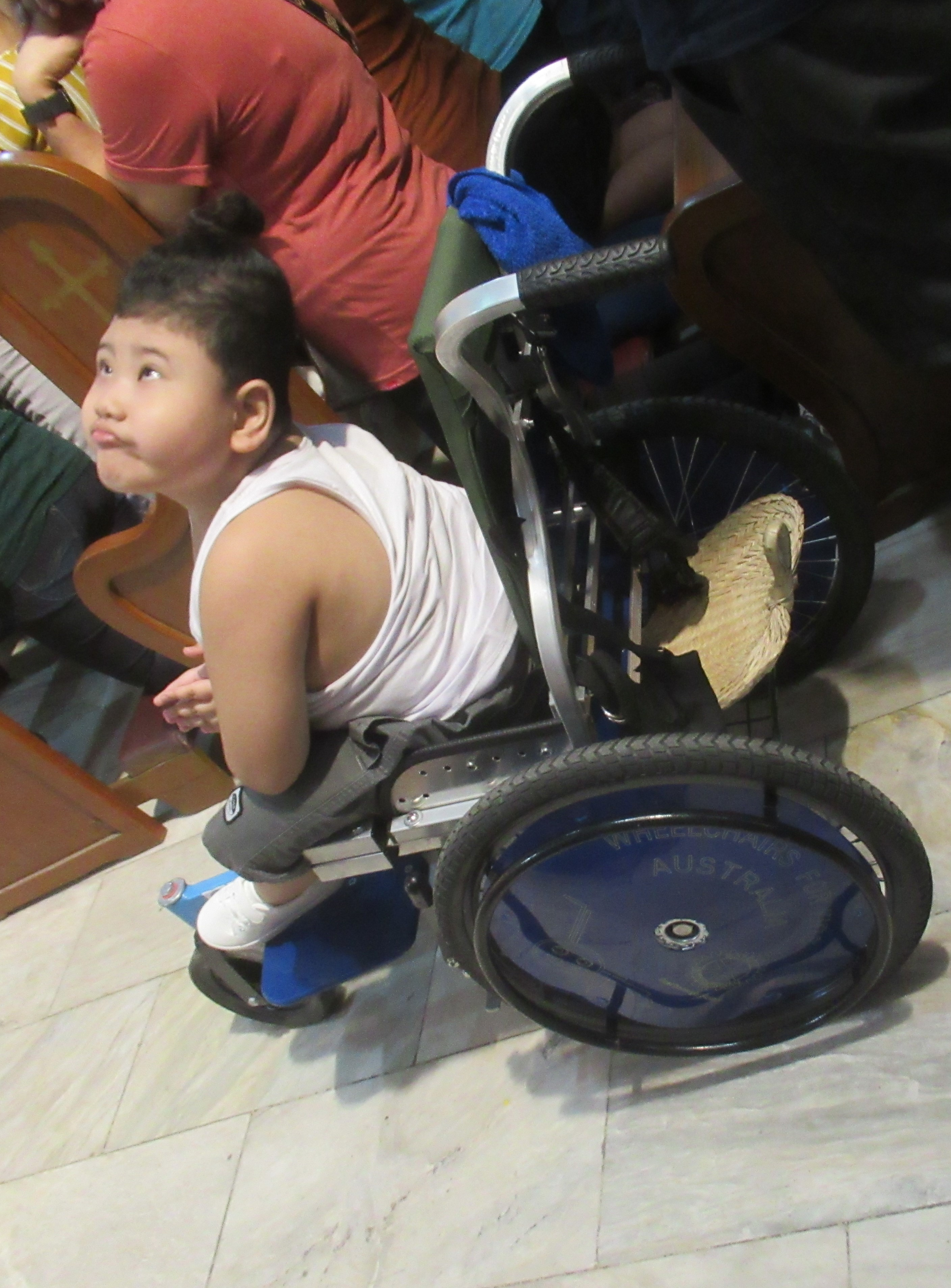
Wheelchairs for Kids Australia

Wheelchairs for Kids was established in 1998 by the Scarborough Rotary Club. Located in Perth, Western Australia, Wheelchairs For Kids Australia is a volunteer-based organisation. The Engineering Department at the University of Western Australia builds the wheelchairs. In July 2026, Wheelchairs for Kids surpassed 70,000 rough-terrain wheelchairs gifted to children with disabilities over the course of the organisation's history.

The inspiration for the project came from Queensland Rotarian Des LaRance, a member of the Rotary Club of Surfers Sunrise on the Gold Coast. During his travels, Des witnessed children with disabilities in Fiji struggling to move around independently. Moved by what he saw, he was inspired to design a low-cost, rough-terrain wheelchair. He then called on Rotary clubs across Australia to help develop a suitable wheelchair for children living in less-developed countries.

An early prototype was made in 1996 using old bicycle frames and wooden bases. However, the design proved time-consuming and expensive to manufacture, and difficult to transport by freight.

Scarborough Rotary approached Br Olly Pickett, who operated a metalworking factory in Wangara that worked with young people who had left school early.

After multiple trials, Br Olly advised that the original design was not practical and withdrew from the project. Together with Bob Sheridan and Beppie de Kuyer, he developed a new design. He presented the improved model to the Scarborough Rotary Club and, in late 1998, the first regular shipments of wheelchairs commenced.

Alongside Br Olly Pickett, Gordon Hudson was a rotarian who was involved with WFKA since the organisation's beginning. Hudson served as an inaugural volunteer CEO, leading the project from 1998 to 2023. Working alongside Br Olly Pickett they became the face and voice of WFKA.

The wheelchair design has continued to evolve into a world-class product that complies with the 2008 World Health Organization publication, Guidelines on the Provision of Manual Wheelchairs in Less Resourced Settings. These guidelines highlighted the need for wheelchairs that are suitable for rough terrain, individually fitted, provide appropriate postural support, and are safe and durable.

These developments led to the introduction of WFKA's “Adjusta” model in 2009. The Adjusta was a world-first design that grows with a child from preschool through to their late teens and is suitable for a wide range of environments.

== Manufacturing Process ==
The wheelchairs are designed in accordance with World Health Organization guidelines on safety, strength, and durability.

WFKA produces approximately 30 wheelchairs each day. Volunteers follow a detailed production process that includes cutting, bending, and drilling the aluminium frame, fitting brake modules, and conducting testing to ensure each wheelchair complies with World Health Organization guidelines for developing countries.

The wheelchairs are then disassembled and packed into boxes for shipping. Each shipment also includes a crocheted rug or quilt, a soft toy, and a handmade toy, all created by volunteers to provide comfort and joy with every delivery.

== Operations ==
WFKA is a volunteer-run organisation with over 300 participants. National Volunteer Week recognised the charity's volunteers, known as the “Blue Army”. These volunteers collectively delivered almost 30,000 volunteer hours in 2025.

== Distribution and Logistics ==
WFKA partners with humanitarian agencies and disability organisations to deliver its all-terrain wheelchairs to children around the world.

Each distribution partner manages local delivery stages, including importing the wheelchairs, coordinating with medical professionals and therapists, and ensuring every child receives a safe, comfortable, and properly fitted wheelchair.

WFKA does not ship wheelchairs directly to individual families, charities, or medical teams. Instead, wheelchairs are shipped in bulk quantities, ranging from 166 units in a 20-foot shipping container to 340 units in a 40-foot shipping container.

Local teams, trained by WFKA, are responsible for assembling and fitting each wheelchair to ensure it is safe and suitable for the child's individual needs.

== Current Milestones ==
WFKA celebrated the production of its 70,000th wheelchair in July 2026.

The occasion also recognised the contributions of Br Olly Pickett, whose design helped form the organisation. The factory was subsequently named in his honour.

== See also ==
Australian Doctors For Africa
