= Western Link =

Western Link or West Link may refer to:

- First Great Western Link, a train operating company in the United Kingdom
- Western HVDC Link, a high-voltage direct current electricity link under construction in the United Kingdom

== See also ==
- Westlink (disambiguation)
