= East-West Link (Brisbane) =

Proposed road tunnel in Brisbane, Queensland, Australia

East-West Link is a proposed road tunnel in Brisbane, Queensland, Australia. It forms the fifth and final component of Brisbane City Council's TransApex plan to connect motorways across the city, construct new river crossings and divert cross-city traffic out of the Brisbane CBD.

== Proposal ==
The East-West Link is a proposed tolled road tunnel linking the Western Freeway at Toowong and the Pacific Motorway at Buranda. Provision may be made for tunnel portals at Indooroopilly or St Lucia. The original TransApex proposal limited the toll to $2 (plus GST).

== Benefits ==
Currently, vehicles travelling from Buranda to the Toowong roundabout have two available routes. The first route involves travelling on the Pacific Motorway, Riverside Expressway and either Coronation Drive or Milton Road. Vehicle taking this route are likely to encounter significant traffic congestion whilst contributing to further congestion themselves. The Riverside Expressway frequently becomes congested in peak hour traffic due to its status as the main route to and from the Brisbane CBD from the south. It also terminates in a set of traffic lights on Coronation Drive or the congested Inner City Bypass causing congestion on the Expressway. Furthermore, Coronation Drive and Milton Road, being the main arterial roads into the Brisbane CBD from the Western Suburbs, are also frequently congested. The numerous sets of traffic lights on both of these long, narrow roads also increases travel times from Buranda to Toowong.

The second route involves travelling on ordinary roads to the Ipswich Motorway, exiting onto the Centenary Motorway and following through to the Western Freeway, which terminates in a roundabout at the base of Mt Coot-tha. This route involves a significant travel distance and congestion on Ipswich Road makes the travel time no shorter than the first, shorter route.

A tunnel between Buranda and the Toowoong roundabout would create a motorway-grade road between those points, eliminating the need for any travel on suburban streets and any encounter with traffic lights. As the tunnel would primarily link two motorways, suburban surface congestion is unlikely to significantly impact on the speed, and thus travel time, through the tunnel. It is envisaged that the East-West Link tunnel would reduce traffic congestion on the Riverside Expressway, Coronation Drive and Milton Road by removing traffic using these roads merely as a thoroughfare to reach the destination at the tunnel's portals.

The East-West Link tunnel would further create another 4 or 6 general traffic lanes for vehicles to cross the Brisbane River. The Brisbane City Council predicted in 2004 that the bridges crossing the Brisbane River were approaching total capacity. A further tunnel which crosses the river would alleviate some of these capacity issues.

== Current status ==
The project does not appear in the Queensland State Government South East Queensland Infrastructure Plan and Program running to 2031. Similarly, East-West Link is not listed in the Department of Transport and Main Roads' Western Brisbane Transport Network Strategy.

However, the East-West Link is only a Brisbane City Council proposal. The Brisbane City Council is currently completing a $1.4 million review of traffic demand for the East-West Link. Whilst originally planned for delivery by 2026, then-Lord Mayor Campbell Newman suggested the delivery date may be brought forward based on the study's results.

Lord Mayor Graham Quirk has stated that the Brisbane City Council's next infrastructure project after completion of the Legacy Way tunnel in 2015 is the upgrade of Kingsford Smith Drive.
