= 2009 Willagee state by-election =

By-election held on 28 November 2009

The 2009 Willagee state by-election was held for the Western Australian Legislative Assembly seat of Willagee on 28 November 2009. It was triggered as a result of the resignation of former Premier of Western Australia Alan Carpenter. The election was won by Labor candidate Peter Tinley.

== Candidates ==
Four candidates stood at the by-election. They were as follows in ballot paper order:

Christian Democratic Party – Henri Chew. Chew stood previously as the Christian Democrats candidate for the district of Carine at the 2008 state election.

Labor Party – Peter Tinley. Tinley is a former SAS major who stood unsuccessfully as the endorsed Labor candidate for the marginal seat of Stirling at the 2007 federal election.

Greens – Hsien Harper. Harper is a union organiser who stood twice previously as a Greens candidate: most recently for the seat of Maylands at the 2008 state election and before that at the 2008 Murdoch state by-election.

Independent – Gerry Georgatos. Georgatos was originally preselected as the Greens candidate in anticipation of a potential by-election in Willagee earlier in the year. However, when the by-election materialised, preselection was re-opened and Georgatos lost to Harper. He subsequently ran as an independent.

The Liberal Party did not field a candidate.

== Results ==
The Liberal Party, who received 30.93 percent of the vote at the previous election in Willagee, did not contest the election. All candidates received a lift in their respective primary vote.

Willagee state by-election, 2009
Party	Candidate	Votes	%	±%
Labor	Peter Tinley	9,160	53.80	+2.15
Greens	Hsien Harper	5,162	30.32	+12.90
Independent	Gerry Georgatos	1,529	8.98	+8.98
Christian Democrats	Henri Chew	1,175	6.90	+6.90
Total formal votes		17,026	95.48	+1.87
Informal votes		863	4.82	−1.87
Turnout		17,889	77.50	−8.62
Two-candidate-preferred result
Labor	Peter Tinley	10,316	60.61	−3.97
Greens	Hsien Harper	6,664	39.39	+39.39
Labor hold		Swing	N/A	
