= Australian Doctors for Africa =

Australian Doctors for Africa (ADFA) is a licensed charity registered in Western Australia. Established in November 2005 by orthopaedic surgeon Dr Graham Forward, ADFA is a non-profit community-based organisation with its headquarters located in Perth, Western Australia. It has no political affiliations. The goals of ADFA are to provide medical supplies, equipment, consult, undertake surgical procedures, disseminate best practice in health care, up skill, in-service and teach local medical and hospital staff and to assess future training needs of local staff to build capacity and maintain sustainable programmes and projects.

== Structure ==
The charity has some 250 members. ADFA is registered with the Australian Taxation Office and ASIC.

Although the size of medical teams vary, ADFA attempts to ensure that a typical team comprises orthopaedic surgeons, an anaesthetist and theatre nurse with additional specialised support incorporated into the team such as a physiotherapist, plaster technician and orthopaedic technician. Other speciality team members include gastroenterology and urology. ADFA has also developed a relationship with The University of Western Australia and sends academic staff to conduct medical student teaching. There are 2–4 visits to each location per year.

The organisation has been recognized by the Royal Australasian College of Surgeons and the Australian Orthopaedic Association.

With an operating budget of less than $200,000 per annum ADFA relies on the support of corporate partners, donations, fund raising activities and volunteers to maintain its core business.

At each location, teams work very closely with the local medical staff with an aim to provide sustainable service provision. There is reciprocal learning and teaching between the visiting and local medical staff.

== Current work ==
There are three locations where the charity has established programmes of medical aid: Somalia, Madagascar and Ethiopia.

=== Somalia ===
Original efforts were based in Bosaso in the north, in Puntland on the Gulf of Aden following the 2005 tsunami which affected the area. Visiting teams of orthopaedic surgeons, nurses and anaesthetists have carried out consultations in clinics and performed many operations on Somali people, injured civilians in the clan fighting and civil war. Visits to Bosaso have been temporarily suspended due to increasing political tension. However work has continued in Hargeisa, Somaliland. The first visit to Hargeisa Group Hospital was in 2007 and since then teams have been visiting 2–3 times a year. Work there includes orthopaedic consultation, teaching and performing operations as well as medical student teaching in conjunction with the University Medical faculty.

ADFA has also built a relationship with Edna Aden Maternity Hospital and in 2013 aided to fund the construction of a radiology building.

As well as the medical and educational assistance provided in Hargeisa, other capacity building achievements include the renovation of the hospital laundry and two operating theatres. Multiple sea container loads of medical and hospital equipment have been despatched from the port of Fremantle, Western Australia, to Bosaso and Hargeisa as well as many kilograms worth of air freight.

=== Madagascar ===
Regular visits have been made to Toliara in the southwest of the country and Antananarivo on the east coast, providing orthopaedic and gastroenterology services to patients at the General Hospital, the Clinique St Lucque, the Military Hospital and the University Hospital. A Urology programme has also been set up. Teams from all three specialty areas provide consultation, teaching and procedures. Much endoscopic equipment has been donated. Teams have been able to train local medical staff in orthopaedics, gastroenterology and urology to ensure that services are sustainable and readily available outside of team visits. Multiple sea containers of surgical and endoscopic equipment have been sent.

=== Ethiopia ===
Regular operating and teaching assignments are carried out at the Tikur Anbessa (Black Lion) Hospital in Addis Ababa. Over the years that ADFA have been visiting Tikur Anbessa, they have helped build the orthopaedic training program and in 2013 there are 16 orthopaedic residents in training, up from just a few five years earlier. ADFA provides basic orthopaedic surgical skills courses for these trainees. Furthermore, it has helped establish a talipes program based on education, early referral and assessment as well as treatment for children with talipes.

The latest capacity building project at Tikur Anbessa is aid with building two new specific orthopaedic operating theatres which begin construction in 2013. Multiple sea containers of medical and equipment have assembled and sent from Claremont, Western Australia, since 2007.
