= Peter Tinley =

Australian politician

The Honourable Peter Tinley AM
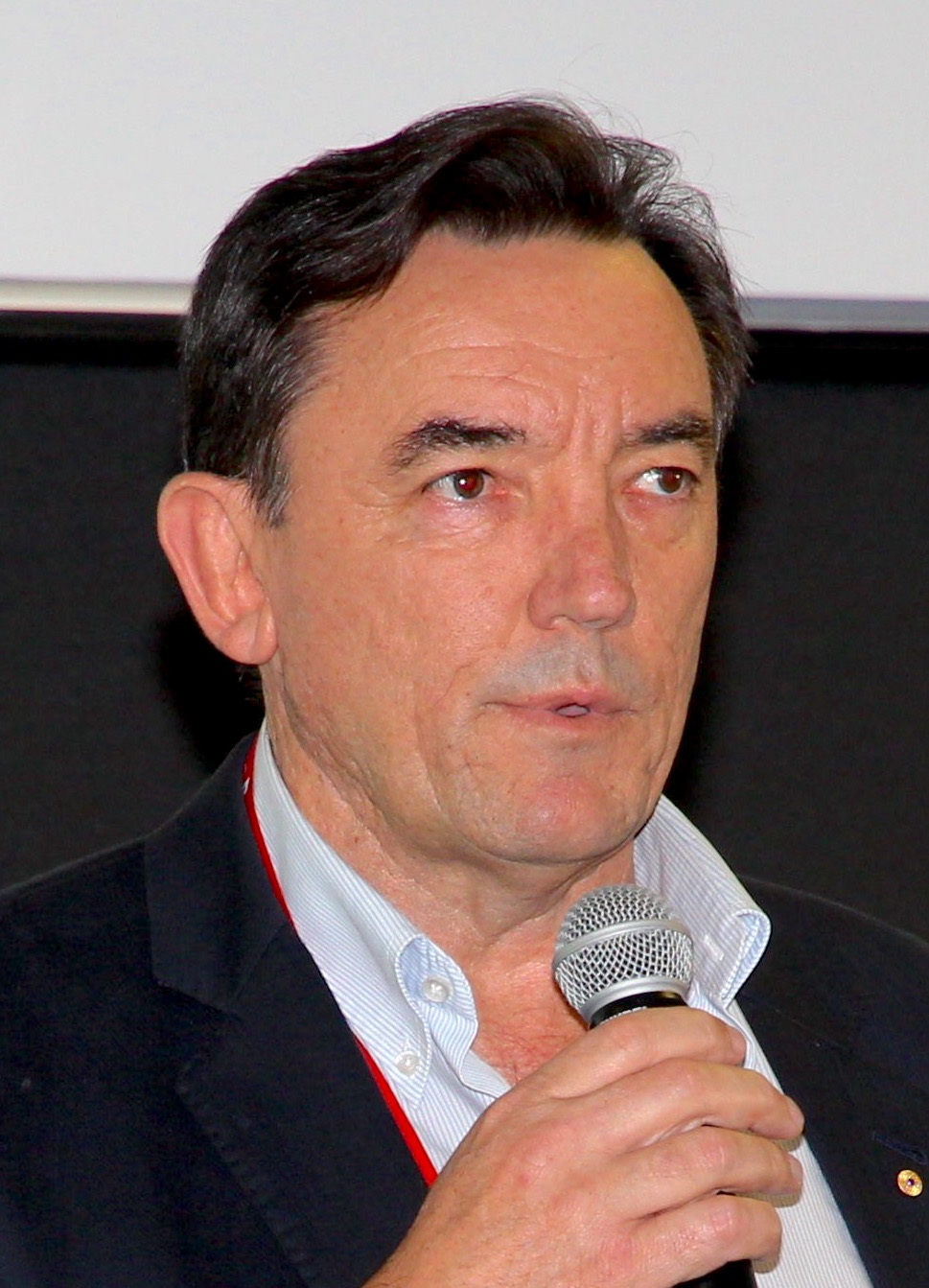

Member of the Western Australian Parliament for Willagee
- In office 28 November 2009 – 5 February 2025
- Preceded by: Alan Carpenter
- Succeeded by: District abolished

Personal details
- Born: Peter Charles Tinley; 9 July 1962 (age 64) Karrinyup, Western Australia
- Party: Labor Party
- Education: University of New England; Royal Military College, Duntroon
- Occupation: Soldier, businessman

Military service
- Allegiance: Australia
- Branch/service: Australian Army
- Years of service: 1981–2006
- Rank: Major
- Unit: Special Air Service Regiment
- Battles/wars: Iraq War
- Awards: Member of the Order of Australia

Peter Charles Tinley (born 9 July 1962) is an Australian politician and former soldier. Peter was a Labor Party member of the Western Australian Legislative Assembly between November 2009 and February 2025, representing the now-abolished electorate of Willagee.

== Early life and military career ==
Born in the northern Perth suburb of Karrinyup, Tinley joined the Australian Army in 1981 and graduated from Royal Military College, Duntroon, earning the Queen's Medal as the cadet graduating top of his class. He spent 17 of his 25 years in the army in the Special Air Service Regiment (SASR). In 2002, he was the lead tactical planner for Australia's special forces advising the United States, and in 2003 he served as Deputy Commander for the Special Forces Task Group in Iraq. In the same year, he was appointed a Member of the Order of Australia (AM) in the military division for "dynamic leadership and consistent professional excellence".

In late 2006, after leaving the army with the rank of major, Tinley spoke out against the decision of the Howard government to support the US and British initiative to invade Iraq on the basis of purported evidence of the country's possession of weapons of mass destruction. He also called for the immediate withdrawal of Australian troops.

In the meantime, Tinley conducted strategic planning and leadership workshops. Among other clients, he worked with the West Coast Eagles Football Club coaching staff. He also ran a small business.

== Political career ==
In 2006, former federal opposition leader Kim Beazley approached Tinley to run for the federal Division of Stirling as the Labor Party's endorsed candidate at the 2007 election. The sitting member, Liberal MP Michael Keenan, retained the seat with a slightly reduced majority.

Upon the resignation of former premier Alan Carpenter from the safe Labor state seat of Willagee, Tinley was preselected to run for Labor at the resulting by-election on 28 November 2009. He was ultimately elected as the member for Willagee with over 60% of the two-party-preferred vote against the Greens' Hsien Harper.

Upon Labor's election to government at the 2017 state election, Tinley was appointed to the McGowan Ministry as minister for mines and petroleum, Veterans Issues, and Youth on 17 March. Five days later on 22 March, Tinley resigned as Mines and Petroleum minister, to avoid any claim of conflict of interest due to a family member working in the industry, and exchanged the Housing portfolio with Bill Johnston. Tinley later became Western Australia's Asian Engagement Minister.

On 19 March 2021, after the 2021 state election, Tinley was unexpectedly removed from cabinet. After spending almost three years as a backbencher, on 14 March 2024 Tinley announced that he would not seek re-election at the 2025 state election.

== Returned & Services League of Australia ==
Peter Tinley joined The Returned & Services League of Australia (RSL Australia) about 2010. As of 2025, he was a member of the Cockburn Sub-Branch in Western Australia and chair of the Veterans' Transition Centre in Western Australia, a 70-bed facility supporting veterans at risk of homelessness. On 16 October 2025 he was elected as the national president of the league.

Parliament of Western Australia
Preceded by Alan Carpenter	Member for Willagee; 2009–2025	District abolished
