= EastLink WA =

Proposed Australian road

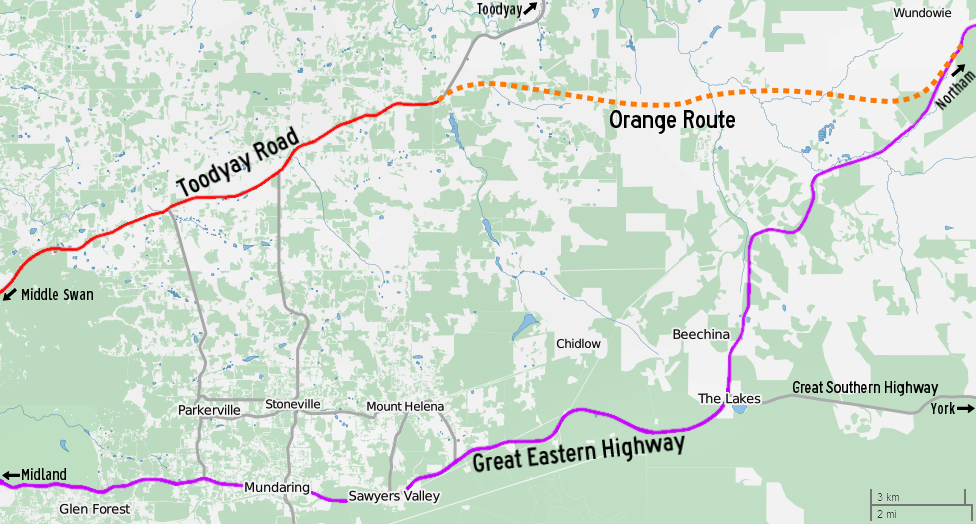
Orange Route (Perth-Adelaide National Highway)

EastLink WA is a planned road construction project between Perth and Northam, Western Australia currently in the planning and development stages, with construction due to start in 2025. The project involves building a controlled-access highway from Perth to Northam, by constructing the "Orange Route", upgrading Toodyay Road, and constructing a system interchange with Roe Highway.

== Route ==
EastLink WA is planned to bypass Great Eastern Highway in the Perth Hills, with the west end beginning at Roe Highway intersection with Toodyay Road in Middle Swan, and then heading east along Toodyay Road towards Gidgegannup, with a new alignment called the Orange Route linking with the Great Eastern Highway near Wundowie, from where it continues east to Northam. It will become the main highway link leading into Perth from Adelaide and the eastern states of Australia.

== Associated works ==
The project also involves upgrading a section of Reid and Roe Highways from Tonkin Highway to Kalamunda Road, by removing at-grade intersections with Altone Road, Daviot Road/Drumpellier Drive, West Swan Road, Great Northern Highway, Toodyay Road and Morrison Road. With the grade-separation of Roe Highway's junction with Great Eastern Highway Bypass, Perth will have a freeway-standard ring road, with the exception of an at-grade intersection with Erindale Road and a sub-standard diamond interchange with the Mitchell Freeway at the north-western end of the loop.

== History ==
In 2018, the federal government provided funding for planning the route.

== See also ==
- Gateway WA
- NorthLink WA
