= Gateway WA =

Road construction project in Perth, Western Australia

External videos
- Animated flyover video showing the planned upgrades (WMV) from Main Roads Western Australia

At-grade intersection of Tonkin and Leach highways in 2013

Gateway WA, formally called the Gateway WA Perth Airport and Freight Access Project, was a $1 billion project that upgraded the road network around Perth Airport.

The project was located on portions of the southern parts of Perth Airport land, and adjacent land allocated for transport. It lay mainly within the local government area of the City of Belmont, with the eastern area located in the City of Kalamunda.

It was the largest project Main Roads Western Australia had ever undertaken, covering the upgrade of Tonkin, Leach, and Roe Highways, and the construction of four new interchanges. The project was jointly funded by state and federal governments, which provided $317.5 million and $686.4 million respectively.

As part of the project, Tonkin Highway was expanded from two to three lanes in both directions, between Great Eastern Highway and Roe Highway, and the existing intersections in this section was grade separated. A new diamond interchange was constructed at Boud Avenue (since known as the Dunreath Drive Interchange), to provide access to the domestic terminal precinct. International terminal access was provided via a new freeway-to-freeway cloverstack interchange at Leach Highway, and a single-point urban interchange which was constructed at Tonkin Highway's intersection with Horrie Miller Drive and Kewdale Road. The existing diamond interchange with Roe Highway was only upgraded to a partial freeway-to-freeway interchange, but with plans to further upgrade it to a completely free-flowing interchange in the future.

The Gateway WA works were separate to Perth Airport redevelopment works undertaken at the same time. The new airport access road, Airport Drive, featured in both projects: the portion in the vicinity of its interchange with Leach and Tonkin Highways was constructed as part of Gateway WA, with the remainder – the majority of the road – part of the airport redevelopment.

In January 2013, works were undertaken to protect or relocate sections of the Canning Trunk water main and the Dampier to Bunbury Natural Gas Pipeline in the vicinity of the project. Construction on the Gateway WA project officially began on 1 February 2013 with a groundbreaking ceremony attended by the state and federal transport ministers, Troy Buswell and Anthony Albanese. The first section to be constructed was an entrance ramp from Abernethy Road to Tonkin Highway southbound. Work on the Leach Highway interchange was expected to commence at the end of 2013, with construction of the other interchanges scheduled to start at the end of 2014.

The whole project was due to be completed by 2017, but then moved to mid-2016 due to the project's construction moving faster than predicted. In September 2015, the completion date was moved to March 2016 following the completion of the Tonkin Highway/Leach Highway, Leach Highway/Abernethy Road and Tonkin Highway/Dunreath Drive Interchanges that same month. The project was also estimated to be 50 million dollars under-budget. The project was announced as completed in April 2016.

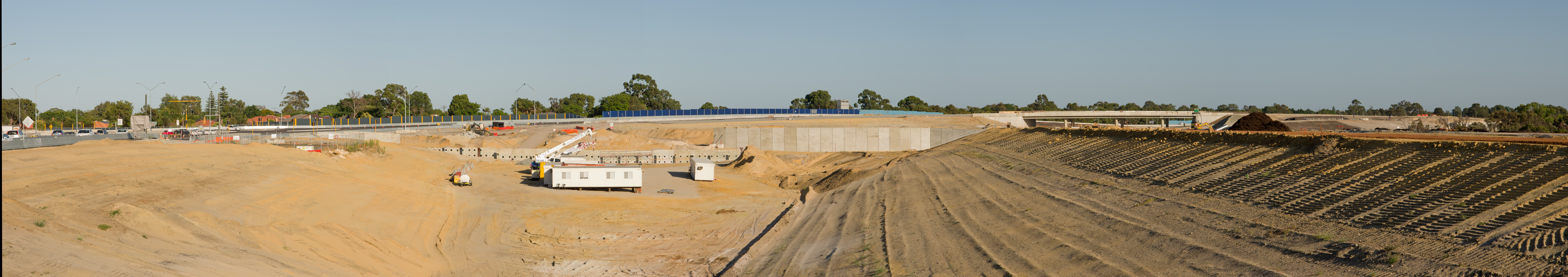
Leach Highway interchange under construction in January 2015

== Components ==
Construction of Gateway WA involved several components, with construction divided into three main zones: northern, western, and southern.

=== Northern zone ===
The northern zone comprised the upgrade of Tonkin Highway, from Great Eastern Highway to Leach Highway, to a six lane standard. A dumbbell interchange was constructed at Dunreath Drive. A free-flowing interchange was constructed to connect Leach Highway, Tonkin Highway, and a new airport access road. The airport access road in the vicinity of this interchange was constructed as part of Gateway WA, while the majority of the road will be constructed as part of the separate airport redevelopment project.

=== Western zone ===
The western zone covered upgrades in Kewdale, including an interchange at Leach Highway and Abernethy Road, and upgrading Leach Highway to expressway standard. Various improvements to the local road network were undertaken, including installing traffic signals at some intersections, and restricting access at others.

=== Southern zone ===
The southern zone comprised the upgrade of Tonkin Highway, from Leach Highway to Roe Highway, to a six lane standard. A single point urban interchange was constructed to connect Tonkin Highway, Kewdale Road, and Horrie Miller Drive. The existing diamond interchange at Tonkin Highway and Roe Highway was upgraded with additional ramps, and an entrance ramp was constructed from Abernethy Road to Tonkin Highway southbound.

=== Other works ===
Other works undertaken as part of Gateway WA include noise walls around the project where it exists near residential areas, as well as along Roe Highway in High Wycombe, and a grade separated interchange between Roe Highway and Berkshire Road.

== See also ==
- EastLink WA
- NorthLink WA
