= Tangentiale Verbindung Ost =

Road engineering project in Berlin, Germany

Coordinates: 52°29′33″N 13°32′54″E

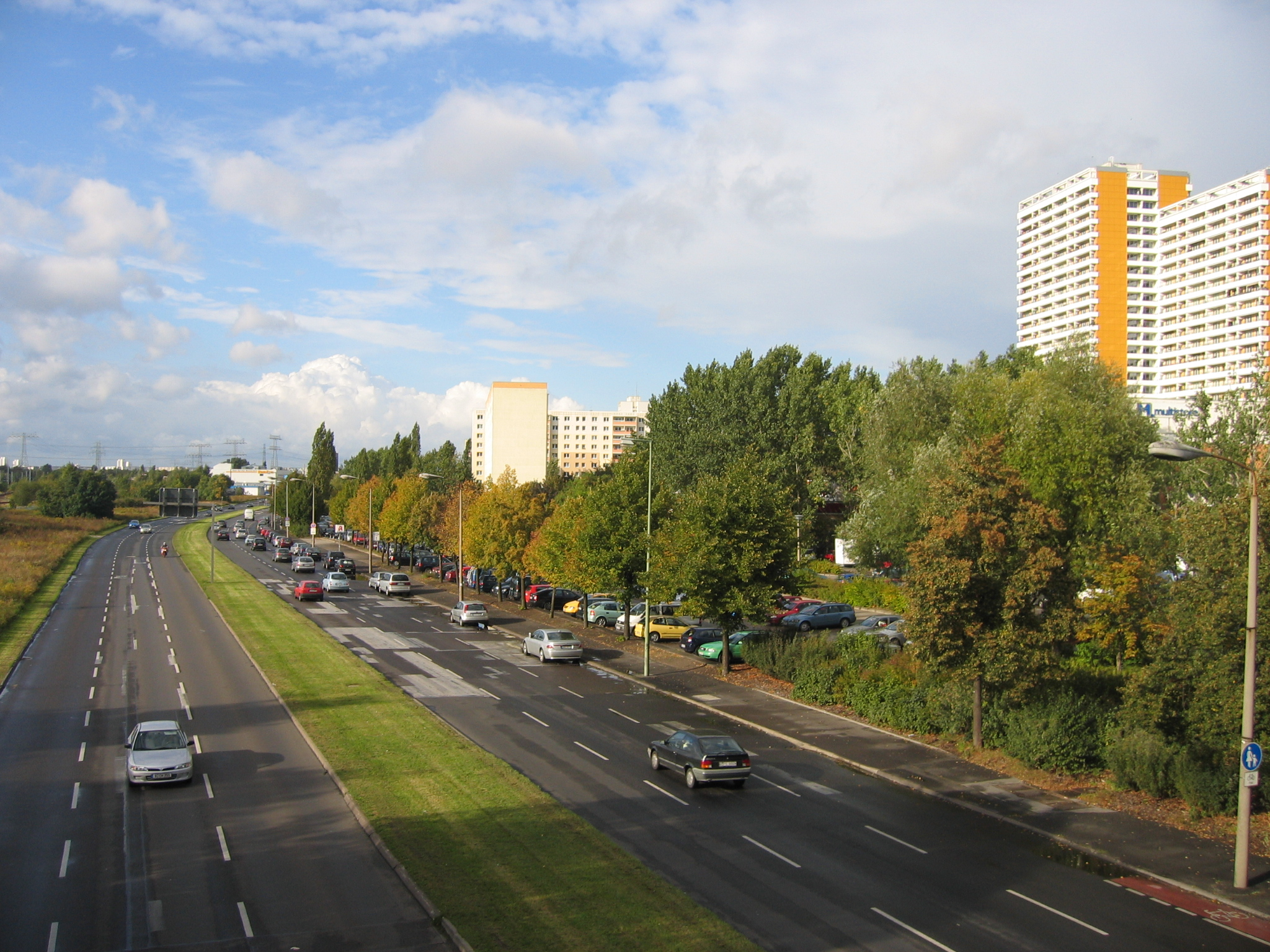
Märkische-Allee, the older part

The East Tangential Link - in German Tangentiale Verbindung Ost (TVO) - is a road project connecting the Eastern boroughs of Berlin, Germany. It was fully described in the Transport Master Plan for the GDR Capital ("Generalverkehrsplan der Hauptstadt der DDR") in 1969 but it is unfinished to date. The original six lane expressway design has been cut back over time.

== Section 1 ==
During the 1970s a number of housing estates were developed in Marzahn that called also for high-performance road links. The Landsberger Allee (Landsberg Avenue) and Frankfurter Allee (Frankfurt Avenue) were expanded to six lanes (four lanes on the outer sections) working as radial roads connecting to the Berlin city center while the Märkische Allee (Northmarch Avenue) was newly constructed as the tangential road running north-south along the new boroughs. This part was finished around 1975.

The historic plan showed a link running from the Northern Outer Orbital along the Märkische Allee crossing the Wuhlheide forest to Köpenick. From Köpenick the road connects to the Adlergestell (Eagle Swath) thoroughfare which continues to the A117/A113 motorways in the south. At the motorway junction it does also connect to the Southern tangential link that is now known as the Expressway Potsdam-Schönefeld. In large parts the road link runs in parallel with the Berlin outer ring rail tracks.

== Section 2 ==
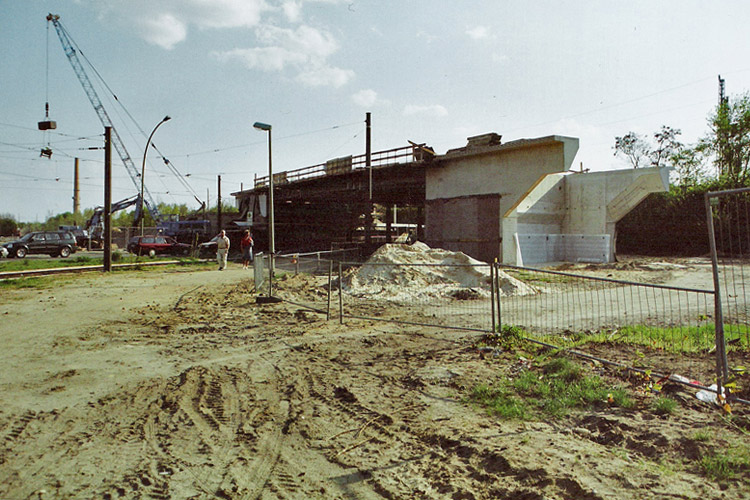
Spindlersfeld Street East-Tangent-Link under construction

In the 1990s a bypass road for Köpenick was planned which was picking up the historic planning. From 1999 to 2007 the Southern part of the East Tangential Link was constructed as a grade-separated four lane expressway along the older Spindlersfelder Straße (Spindlersfeld Street) with a new bridge over the river Spree. Instead of Spindlersfelder Straße the new road is often called just Tangential-Verbindung-Ost (East-Tangent-Link) on itself.

Since 2010 the extension from the Southern exit was under construction. The two lane Glienicker Weg (Glienicke Way) has been expanded to four lanes thereby hoping to remove a major source of congestion - its reconstruction started in 2010 and it finished in 2013.

== Section 3 ==
The East Tangential Link is missing a part of 6 km length in the middle from the Northern exit of Spindlersfeld Street to the Southern exit of the Northmarch Avenue. The Senate of Berlin postponed its construction to 2030 which was felt as close to never by many. In 2007 action groups formed that campaign for an earlier completion thereby removing the traffic that currently runs along the two lane main streets of Biesdorf, Kaulsdorf, Mahlsdorf (-dorf means "village") which are otherwise quiet residential settlements. While the Senate plans a two lane bypass road the campaign proponents ask for a four lane road and they are supported by the conservatives parties CDU and FDP as well as the Verband Deutscher Grundstücksnutzer (Association of Land Users). However a subsequent pilot study did show an increase of the construction costs from 46.2 million Euro (two-lane design as of 2009) to 79.6 million Euro (four-lane design requiring more overpasses).

The 2011 party program of SPD and Linke in Marzahn has now included the extension of the East Tangential Link however they restrict this position to the missing part between B1/B5 and the Berlin Wuhlheide station to be constructed in its cheapest variant. The IHK Berlin (Chamber of Industry and Commerce of Berlin) does also support a connection from Marzahn to the BBI Airport even though the Senate expects that the additional traffic on the existing roads will be below 10% when the new airport was scheduled to open in 2012. The argument goes along the same line as the conservatives party has expressed in that the mere existence of a direct connection is a fundament of economic growth of Marzahn-Hellersdorf. There is already a road from the rail junction from the Wuhlheide rail junction to Spindlersfeld but it has a number of grade crossings and it runs somewhat more east - an overpass at the rail junction is the problematic part so far and it is expected that its construction would be easier if the rail hub itself would be rebuilt. This has been on map for quite a time already but no definite plan has been devised.

On February 9, 2012 the heads of the city boroughs Treptow-Köpenick, Lichtenberg and Marzahn-Hellersdorf agreed on a common planning variant. The new section will be a four lane expressway with estimated costs of 82 million Euros. In the Southern section the new expressway will run on the Eastern side of the rail tracks - north of the Wuhlheide station will it have its only exits to the business park of Biesdorf to the East and to the Waldow Avenue of Karlshorst to the West. It will then run further on the Eastern side of the rail track to about Alfeld Street where it crosses under the railway embankment to the Western side. From there it will directly attach the Bundesstraße 1 in the North. Planning and construction are supposed to be worked on swiftly to allow the section to be finished when the reconstruction of the railway hub near Wuhlheide station will start.

The regional planning of Marzahn-Hellersdorf expected shortly thereafter (in 2013) that construction works on the remaining section will start in 2016 with an estimate of the total costs of about 90 million Euro. While the agreement on an early construction did hold the details were changed in the following years. The Senate is favouring a four-lane road that runs completely on the Eastern side of the rail tracks with at least six additional exits with most of them being at-grade. Many house owners do not want an exit to their street however. As a consequence the building department runs extensive studies in preparation of potential lawsuits, and it expected in October 2015 that the planning approval process will not start before 2017 with a formal planning approval to be reached in 2019. When construction starts in 2019 the road will be ready in 2022. With that information the officials of the Senate and the Borough parliament expressed their intent to speed up the process. In a public hearing in November 2015 it became clear however that not even the alignment is fixed so that there is little chance to start construction earlier than some when in 2018.
