= Alan Carpenter =

Australian politician

The Honourable Alan Carpenter
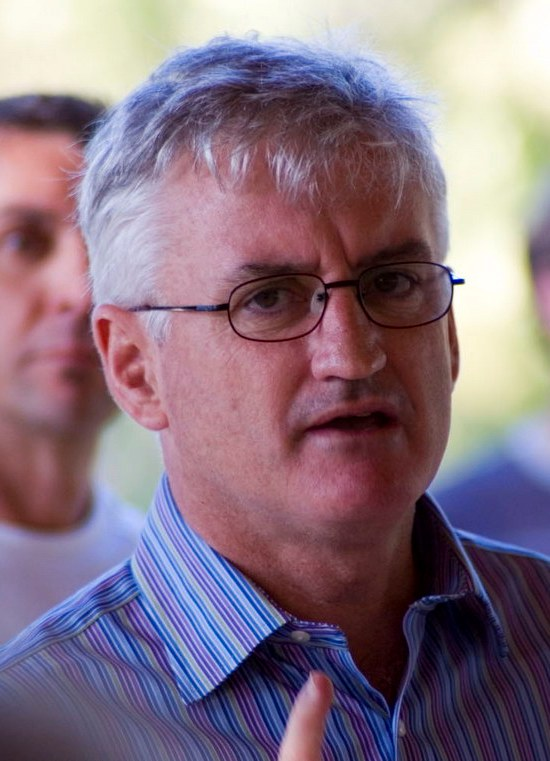
- Carpenter delivering a speech at Kings Park in 2006

28th Premier of Western Australia
- In office 25 January 2006 – 23 September 2008
- Monarch: Elizabeth II
- Governor: Ken Michael
- Deputy: Eric Ripper
- Preceded by: Geoff Gallop
- Succeeded by: Colin Barnett

Leader of the Western Australian Labor Party
- In office 24 January 2006 – 16 September 2008
- Preceded by: Geoff Gallop
- Succeeded by: Eric Ripper

Member of the Western Australian Legislative Assembly for Willagee
- In office 14 December 1996 – 2 October 2009
- Preceded by: Constituency established
- Succeeded by: Peter Tinley

Personal details
- Born: Alan John Carpenter; 4 January 1957 (age 69) Albany, Western Australia
- Party: Labor
- Children: 4
- Profession: Journalist, politician

Alan John Carpenter (born 4 January 1957) is an Australian former politician and journalist who was the premier of Western Australia from 25 January 2006 to 23 September 2008. A member of the Labor Party, he served in the Western Australian Legislative Assembly from 1996 to 2009 and was a minister in the Gallop government from 2001 to 2006.

Carpenter was born and raised in Albany, Western Australia. After studying political science at the University of Western Australia, Carpenter worked as a journalist for the Albany Advertiser, TVW, and ABC News, becoming the host of the local edition of The 7.30 Report in 1992. In the 1996 state election, Carpenter was elected to the seat of Willagee in Perth's south. In 1997, Labor leader Geoff Gallop appointed Carpenter to the shadow ministry, and following Labor's victory in the 2001 state election, Carpenter was appointed to the cabinet of Western Australia, with the portfolios of education, sport and recreation, and Indigenous affairs. Following another Labor victory in the 2005 state election, Carpenter held the portfolios of state development and energy.

In January 2006, Gallop unexpectedly resigned as Premier and Labor leader, and Carpenter succeeded him. His period as premier was marked by cabinet turmoil; three ministers resigned due to their links with disgraced former premier Brian Burke, who was now a lobbyist. His major achievement was the introduction of a domestic gas reservation policy, which required that 15 percent of gas from major LNG gas projects be reserved for the domestic market. He was generally popular throughout his time as Premier. In August 2008, he called an early election for 6 September to capitalise on the Liberal Party having just replaced their leader Troy Buswell with Colin Barnett. His popularity declined during the campaign, and the election resulted in a hung parliament, with Labor two seats short of a majority. The Liberal Party was able to gain the support of the National Party and three independents to form government, and so Barnett succeeded Carpenter as premier. Carpenter resigned from parliament in 2009, and he has since worked as an executive for Wesfarmers from 2009 to 2018.

== Early life ==
Carpenter was born on 4 January 1957 in Albany, Western Australia, the eldest of three children of Graham and Elaine Carpenter. He grew up in Lockyer, a suburb of Albany, and attended Albany Senior High School. After graduating, he travelled across Australia before enrolling at the University of Western Australia in Perth, where he studied politics and was active in the university's football club. After graduating in 1979, Carpenter began a career in journalism, initially working for the Albany Advertiser. From 1982 to 1986, he travelled throughout Asia and Europe. During this period, he managed a backpackers' hostel in London and taught English at a school in Civitanova Marche in Italy.

Upon moving back to Perth in 1986, Carpenter joined television station TVW as a reporter, where he met his future wife. In 1990, he joined ABC News and, from 1991, worked on the Western Australian edition of The 7.30 Report, the ABC's current affairs program. Following Liam Bartlett departure as the show's host in 1992, Carpenter succeeded him in the role. Through his work on The 7.30 Report, Carpenter became acquainted with Mark Nolan, the state secretary of the Labor Party. The two became friends, and Nolan encouraged Carpenter to enter politics. When nominations opened for Labor candidates for the 1996 state election, Carpenter nominated for the newly created electoral district of Willagee.

== Political career ==
As a former television host, Carpenter was one of the most prominent non-incumbent candidates at the 1996 state election. Willagee was notionally held by Labor on a 2.2 percent margin, and the party, including Carpenter personally, invested significant campaign resources for the seat of Willagee. Despite several opinion polls indicating that Labor would lose Willagee, Carpenter was elected with 50.1 percent of the primary vote, defeating three other candidates. In his maiden speech to Parliament, Carpenter voiced support for changing the Australian flag, electoral reform, fixed and simultaneous terms for both houses of Parliament, and constitutional recognition of Aboriginal Australians. He was also critical of the parliamentary pension arrangements for former politicians and the disparity in income between the highest- and lowest-paid workers, citing Wesfarmers as an example.

From the start of his political career, Carpenter was regarded as a potential future member of the frontbench or even a party leader. In January 1997, Labor leader Geoff Gallop appointed him to the shadow ministry, where he held the portfolios of disability services and sport and recreation. In August 1999, Carpenter was promoted to the higher-profile portfolios of education, family and children's services, and drug strategy.

Following Carpenter's maiden speech, the Coalition government, led by Richard Court, introduced legislation to reduce the pension entitlements of former politicians. Under the new scheme, members elected in 1996 could choose to transfer to the revised pension arrangements, while those elected before 1996 remained on the previous scheme. Carpenter was the only member elected in 1996 to voluntarily transfer to the new scheme, foregoing pension benefits worth hundreds of thousands of dollars.

=== As a minister ===
Following Labor's victory in the February 2001 state election, Carpenter became the minister for education, minister for sport and recreation, and minister for Indigenous affairs. In January 2003, the departments of education and training, which was responsible for technical and further education, were merged, resulting in Carpenter becoming the minister for education and training. In June 2003, Carpenter relinquished the portfolios of sport and recreation and Indigenous affairs. Following the 2005 state election, Carpenter relinquished education and training, gaining the more economically-oriented portfolios of state development and energy in March 2005, upon which, The West Australian newspaper described Carpenter as being on track to succeed Gallop as premier.

As the minister for education, Carpenter raised the school leaving age from 15 to 17. In May 2002, he announced that he supported raising the school leaving age. According to a state government report, over one fifth of 15 to 19 year olds were not in education, full-time employment or training. At a Labor Party conference in July 2003, delegates voted in favour of making raising the school leaving age an official party policy. As the minister for energy, Carpenter introduced legislation for the breakup of Western Power into four separate entities.

== Premier ==
On 16 January 2006, Gallop unexpectedly announced his resignation as Premier and Labor leader due to depression, effective immediately. At the time, Carpenter was on holiday in Europe; he cut his holiday short to run for leader of the Labor Party. Carpenter and Attorney-General Jim McGinty soon emerged as the leading contenders to replace Gallop, while Treasurer Eric Ripper and Police Minister Michelle Roberts were also contenders. Days later, Carpenter and Roberts nominated for the Labor Party leadership. McGinty instead endorsed Carpenter, leading to Roberts' withdrawal. Carpenter was elected leader of the Labor Party unopposed in a caucus meeting on 24 January. He was sworn in as premier by Governor Ken Michael on 25 January. Carpenter held Gallop's former portfolios and the rest of the Gallop ministry retained their roles until a new ministry could be sworn in.

=== Ministry ===
Carpenter's ministry was unveiled on 1 February and sworn in on 3 February. Controversially, Carpenter had promoted Norm Marlborough, an ally of Brian Burke, to the ministry. Gallop had previously rejected Marlborough due to his links to Burke. Carpenter also lifted a ban on ministers dealing with Burke and his lobbying partner Julian Grill.

In April 2006, John D'Orazio, the minister for justice, minister for police and emergency services and minister for community safety, crashed his car while driving on a suspended licence. Carpenter reassigned D'Orazio to the portfolios of disability services, citizenship and multicultural interests, and seniors and volunteering on 8 May, but D'Orazio resigned from cabinet a day later after outcry from Labor backbenchers and ministers. D'Orazio was replaced in cabinet by Tony McRae. In August 2006, the Corruption and Crime Commission (CCC) heard evidence that D'Orazio had met with a corrupt panel beater to discuss the problem with D'Orazio's driver's licence. Carpenter requested and received D'Orazio's resignation from the Labor Party. D'Orazio was cleared of misconduct by the CCC in December 2007, and in April 2008, he was readmitted to the Labor Party, against the wishes of Carpenter, who said that he did not trust D'Orazio not to leak information from caucus.

In November 2006, Marlborough resigned from cabinet after it was revealed at a CCC hearing that he used a secret phone to communicate with Burke. Burke and his lobbying partner Julian Grill had been under investigation and had their phones tapped by the CCC for lobbying for the Smiths Beach development in Yallingup. In one instance, Burke tried to direct Marlborough to appoint a woman to a government commission. Two days later, Burke left the Labor Party, after Carpenter issued an ultimatum that he would quit if Burke did not leave the party. Carpenter reshuffled his cabinet in December 2006, but opted not to replace Marlborough's spot, leaving cabinet with 16 members. Ljiljanna Ravlich, who performed poorly as the minister for education, was demoted to less important portfolios, and John Bowler and Sheila McHale were demoted too.

In February 2007, McRae was removed from cabinet after he was questioned by the CCC. McRae had discussed political fundraising with Grill and was accused of reversing a planning decision for Burke and Grill when he was the assistant minister for planning. Carpenter said that "Mr McRae has committed a major error of judgement in discussing political fundraising assistance with a person commercially involved with a project that was before the minister for consideration. A day later, Bowler was removed from cabinet and resigned from the Labor Party after it was alleged at a CCC hearing that he was revealing government secrets to Burke and Grill. Another cabinet reshuffle occurred at the start of March 2007, where Sue Ellery was promoted to cabinet, leaving cabinet with 15 members.

=== Achievements ===
In August 2006, the state's unemployment rate dropped to 3.1 percent, the lowest of any state.

Carpenter implemented the domestic gas reservation policy, which required that 15 percent of gas from major LNG gas projects be reserved for the domestic market. The policy was criticised at the time by industry and the federal government, which claimed the policy would reduce investment in gas projects, but it has since been praised, particularly during a gas shortage in the eastern states of Australia in 2022.

=== 2008 state election ===
The state opposition cycled through four separate leaders of the opposition during Carpenter's term as premier. When Carpenter became premier, Matt Birney was the opposition leader and leader of the Liberal Party, having been in the position since Colin Barnett relinquished the leadership after the 2005 state election. A year after the election, Birney was defeated in a leadership spill by Paul Omodei, who was himself defeated in a leadership spill by Troy Buswell at the start of 2008. On 6 August 2008, the Liberal Party replaced Buswell as leader with Colin Barnett. One day later, Carpenter called a snap election for 6 September, five months early.

Carpenter made a number of controversial "captain's calls" regarding preselection. Incumbent Swan Hills MLA Jaye Radisich wanted to contest the electoral district of West Swan, but was overruled in favour of Carpenter's chief of staff Rita Saffioti. D'Orazio wanted to contest the new electoral district of Morley for the Labor Party, but was overruled in favour of journalist Reece Whitby. D'Orazio quit the Labor Party again and contested the seat as an independent. Bob Kucera's seat of Yokine was abolished and he wanted to run for the seat of Mount Lawley. Carpenter believed him, at the age of 63, to be too old, and so Karen Brown was chosen to run instead. Additionally, John Bowler contested Kalgoorlie as an independent.

The Liberal Party achieved a swing towards it, winning 51.85 percent of the two-party-preferred vote. The Labor Party won 28 out of 59 seats, two short of a majority. The Liberal Party had 24 seats, the National Party had four seats, and there were three seats held by independents. Bowler retained Kalgoorlie as an independent and the Liberal Party won Morley due to D'Orazio's support for the Liberal candidate there, meaning that if neither of them had left the party, Labor would have won an outright majority. Nationals leader Brendon Grylls remained open to supporting either major party if they were to support his Royalties for Regions policy, but other Nationals MPs were in firm opposition to a Labor–Nationals government. On 14 September, the leader of the Nationals, Brendon Grylls, announced that his party would support the Liberals to form a minority government. Later that day, Carpenter conceded that Labor had lost the election, and said he would resign as Labor leader. Ripper was elected on 16 September to replace Carpenter as Labor Leader. Barnett was sworn in as the premier on 23 September.

In 2011, Parliament passed legislation fixing the date of state elections to the second Saturday in March every four years, to prevent the premier from calling an early election for political reasons. The legislation was passed with bipartisan support.

== Post-political career ==
In September 2009, Carpenter announced that he would resign as the member for Willagee, effective 2 October 2009. Peter Tinley retained Willagee for the Labor Party in the following by-election. In 2009, he taught a politics course at the University of Notre Dame Australia, and in December 2009, Carpenter joined Wesfarmers as its executive general manager for corporate affairs, reporting to chief executive Richard Goyder. The appointment gained media commentary because Goyder is a strong advocate for deregulating retail trading hours and had previously criticised Carpenter's position on retail trading hours. Carpenter said he would support Wesfarmers' position on retail trading hours while employed by the company. Carpenter left his position in August 2018, and spent the rest of the year at Wesfarmers in an advisory position, before leaving the company.

From September 2020 to early 2022, Carpenter was a board member for the state government agency DevelopmentWA as a director.

== Personal life ==
Carpenter is married and has four daughters. He supports the Fremantle Football Club.

== See also ==
- Electoral results for the district of Willagee

Western Australian Legislative Assembly
New seat	Member for Willagee; 14 December 1996 – 2 October 2009	Succeeded by Barry Hodge
Political offices
Preceded by Geoff Gallop	Premier of Western Australia; 25 January 2006 – 23 September 2008	Succeeded by Colin Barnett
Party political offices
Preceded by Geoff Gallop	Leader of the Western Australian Labor Party; 24 January 2006 – 16 September 2008	Succeeded by Eric Ripper
