= Beeliar Wetlands =

- Region
- Interactive map of Beeliar Wetlands
- Coordinates: 32°08′S 115°50′E
- Country: Australia
- State: Western Australia
- City: Southwest portion of the metropolitan area of Perth
- Established: 1 June 1829

Government
  - State electorate: Western Australian Government
  - Federal division: Commonwealth Government

Area
  - Total: 4.0 km^{2} (1.5 sq mi)

Population
  - Total: 7,454
  - Density: 1,864/km^{2} (4,830/sq mi)

The Beeliar Wetlands is a wetland in the southwest portion of Western Australia. It is made up of two chains of lakes and wetlands that run parallel to the west coast of Australia. They are situated on the Swan Coastal Plain between the Darling Escarpment and the Indian Ocean. Beeliar was the name given to the area by the Aboriginal people that lived and hunted in the area.

The first chain of lakes and wetlands lies about 1–3 kilometres (0.62–1.86 mi) inland from the Indian Ocean. The lakes in this chain are mostly saline and often described as "seasonal" because they often dry up during summer months. The second chain is situated a further 6–8 kilometres (3.7–5.0 mi) inland and includes several large freshwater lakes. The Beeliar Wetlands are in the southwest portion of the metropolitan area of Perth, Western Australia. The northernmost point is in the suburb of Mount Pleasant, just south of the Swan River. The wetlands stretch some 25 kilometres (16 mi) south to the suburb of Baldivis.

The state government has incorporated the remnants of the wetlands, including some 19 lakes and numerous other wetlands, into the Beeliar Regional Park, which is managed by its Department of Environment and Conservation. The park is composed of several separate portions and is not one contiguous expanse of land.

== Location and geography ==
When the Beeliar – a subgroup of the Whadjuk Nyungar Aboriginal people – controlled the areas, they lived alongside the wetlands now within the bounds of the metropolitan area. Most of the Aboriginal campsites within the City of Cockburn are located "along the banks of North and Bibra Lakes".

The lakes were an important meeting and trading place for the Noongar; there were many well-used trails to and from the lakes, forming "the main transport route between the Murray and Swan River Nyungar Groups".

== History and recognition ==
The area around Cockburn was colonized in 1829 when European settlers first arrived, however only in the 1890s did the City of Cockburn start growing at a rapid rate and undergo urbanisation. "Cockburn has evolved into a fast-growing local government area." The rich history of Cockburn dates back 40,000 years. The Beeliar Nyungar people have strong cultural and historical ties to the City of Cockburn and feel a deep-rooted connection to the more natural areas of the city.

=== Aboriginal context ===
'Nyungar' is a general term used to describe any clan that lived "in the south-west of Western Australia". Currently there are thirteen groups of Aboriginal clans still living in the area – one of which is referred to as the Whadjuk – that

identify as Nyungah. Until the Swan River colony was founded on their boodjar ('country') in 1829, each moort ('clan') lived within their own 'run', following bidi ('foodlines') from the coast to the chain of wetlands and across the sandy, woodland plain to the escarpment thirty kilometres [19 mi] inland.

These tribes have always contributed to trading in the area as a means of gathering needed materials. These clans "went as far as Uluru and the center of Australia" and vice versa from the Indigenous groups in these areas.

=== Aboriginal use ===
The Beeliar clan are the traditional owners of the land before settlers arrived; they are one of the many Whadjuk clans living in and around the area that would become the Perth metropolitan region. Ancestors of the clan believe that their spirits will always be linked to the nature of the Cockburn land. Ancient stories left by the Nyungar clan state that the city's many connected wetlands are represented by a rainbow serpent, referred to as the Waakal. This was known to be the wetland's modern view as the serpent weaves through Fremantle to Mandurah, where the wetlands are. "The Waakal creates the shape of the Boodjar, over, under, and through the earth and gives foundation to the meaning of life in Cockburn."

=== Aboriginal history ===
In Australia, Aboriginal history stretches "well over 40,000 years". In Western Australia the Nyungar people used to control and live on this land during that time. The name Nyungar is given to anyone who "occupied and continue to occupy the whole South West" of Western Australia. The word Nyungar is accepted as meaning 'people', 'person' in the indigenous language; common modern spellings include Noongar, Nyungah and Nyoongar, however, they all translate to the same meaning. The Beeliar people were "one of the clans of Whadjuk group of Nyungar". Beeliar was later found to translate to 'river people' as the tribe used to occupy the land nearest to the river, the land we now know as the City of Cockburn is where the Beeliar used to live; they referred to it as Beeliar Boodjar, boodjar meaning 'country'. "Words in the Nyungar language can be written in many different ways due to regional dialectic differences and the absence of a common orthography."

== Nature ==
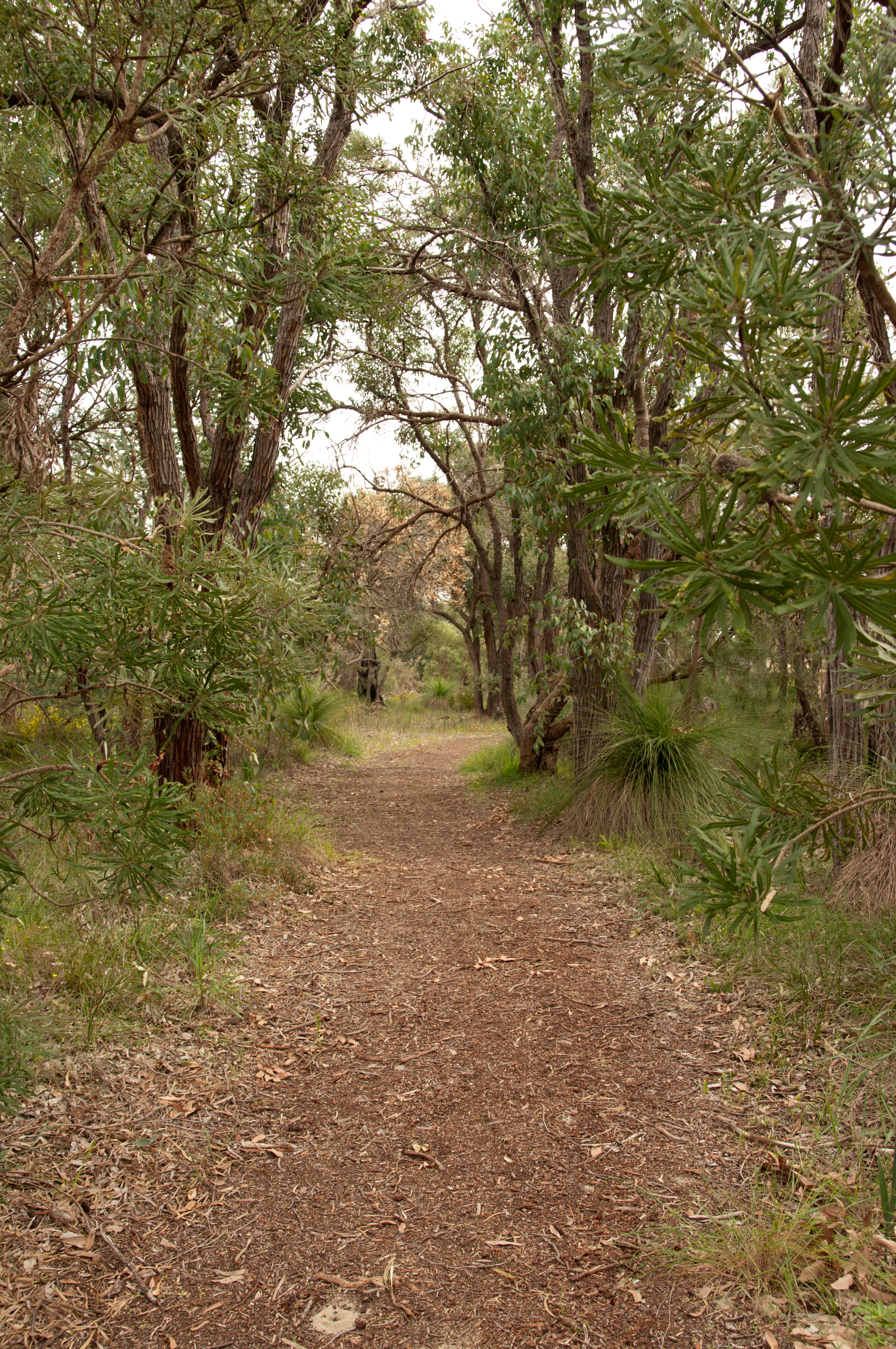
Banksia woodlands between Murdoch University and Bibra Lake

The Beeliar land is known for its extensive wetland system throughout the Cockburn area. The locals have always valued these wetlands as they have always held great spiritual significance for the Nyungar people. This land was also valued for its ability to provide food, medical, and manufacturing resources.

The Beeliar land is often referred to as "Beeliar Boodjar", "Boodjar" being the Noongar word for "land"; this land is still frequently visited by the Nyungar people. When the Indigenous tribes controlled this land it had two main campsites: the "Coolbellup (North Lake) and Walliabup (Bibra Lake). Nyunagr continued camping in the Cockburn area through the 1980s." To fulfill social and cultural obligations, the Beeliar Nyungar and other Nyungar clans used well-established trails that linked wetlands together.

== Human Impact ==
=== Roe 8 damage ===
The extension to Roe Highway known as Roe 8 had been planned to pass through the Beeliar Wetlands. There had been significant opposition to the highway, including legal challenges and public protests. Work on the project was suspended after a change of government in the March 2017 state election, with the incoming Labor government intending to cancel the project.

As of 18 March 2017 a group of volunteers have begun spreading mulch – from the woodchipped original trees – as the first steps toward restoring the cleared area.

The Beeliar area was previously owned by the Beeliar people. Therefore, it has become important to the community to preserve this land. The land of The Beeliar Land holds great significance to the original owners and their ancestors and is viewed as having great education factors for new generations, therefore any damage to this land will cause emotional distress to locals. "The plan has met with years of protests by local government, environmentalists and residents who are concerned about the economic, social and environmental issues associated with the development." A large issue people had was the damage caused by a plan to build the highway, Roe 8, the damage that building this highway would cause would take decades to restore. "Work on the first stage of the $1.9 billion Perth Freight Link, an extension of Roe Highway across the wetlands, stopped just 24 hours after the Liberal-National alliance lost power in a landslide election defeat." After being made to halt work "Opponents to the federal-backed Perth Freight Link have committed to persevere and take their case to the High Court after the Government of Western Australia won an appeal to reverse a decision that invalidated environmental approval for the $1.9 billion project." The plan for the highway is to cut through the spiritual lands of the Beeliar wetlands but conservationists prepared to resist in order to stop the first stage of work. The case that halted work on the highway is referred to as "Jacob v save Beeliar Wetlands":

Martin CJ's judgment in Save Beeliar Wetlands v Jacob created a significant degree of uncertainty for many state departments and statutory bodies. The primary implication being that published policies were potentially mandatory relevant considerations in their administrative decision-making processes. It presaged the urgent review of many such policies to avoid future challenges from similarly 'disgruntled parties'.

== See also ==
- Wanneroo wetlands
