= Electoral district of Willagee =

State electoral district of Perth, Western Australia

Willagee Western Australia—Legislative Assembly
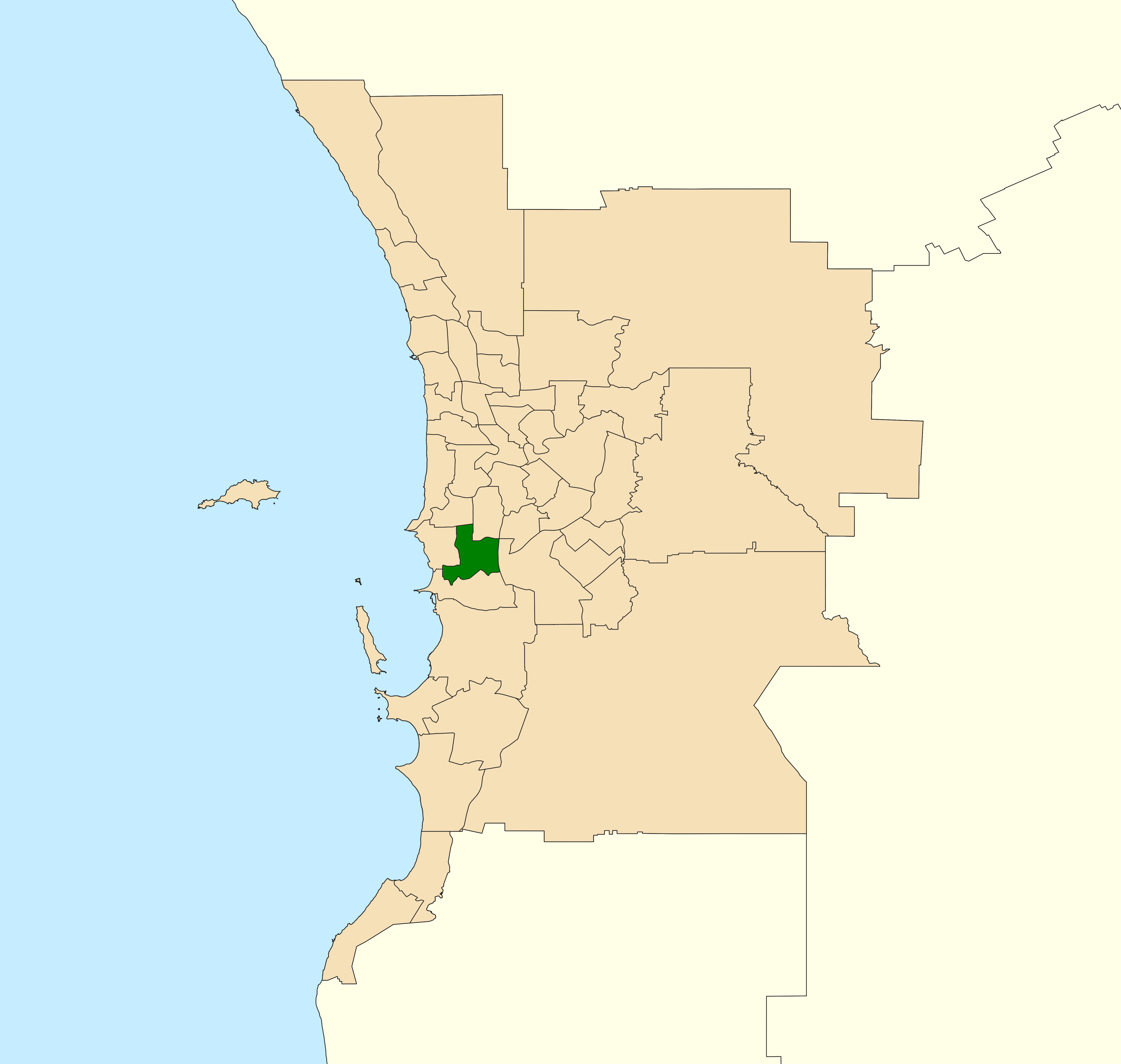
- Interactive map of district boundaries from the 2021 state election to 2025
- State: Western Australia
- Dates current: 1996–2025
- Namesake: Willagee
- Electors: 28,393 (2021)
- Area: 35 km^{2} (13.5 sq mi)
- Demographic: Metropolitan

Willagee was an electoral district of the Legislative Assembly in the Australian state of Western Australia. The district was located in the southern suburbs of Perth. It existed from 1996 to 2025, when it was replaced by the electoral district of Bibra Lake.

Willagee was at all times a safe Labor seat.

== Geography ==
Willagee is an electorate in Perth's south, to the east and south-east of Fremantle. It includes:

- the suburbs of Willagee, Kardinya and Murdoch from the City of Melville;
- the suburbs of O'Connor and Samson from the City of Fremantle;
- the suburbs of Coolbellup, Bibra Lake, North Lake and South Lake from the City of Cockburn.

== History ==
Willagee was first created at the 1994 redistribution ahead of the 1996 state election. It was won by Labor candidate Alan Carpenter, who later served as Minister for Education and other portfolios in the Gallop Ministry. Following Geoff Gallop's retirement from politics in January 2006, Carpenter became Premier, which he remained until the 2008 state election, at which Labor lost its majority. He retired from politics effective 2 October 2009 and the resulting by-election, held on 28 November, was won by Labor candidate Peter Tinley.

The electoral district of Willagee was abolished at the 2025 state election, and replaced by the electoral district of Bibra Lake.

== Members for Willagee ==
Member	Party	Term
Alan Carpenter	Labor	1996–2009
Peter Tinley	Labor	2009–2025

== Election results ==
2021 Western Australian state election: Willagee
Party	Candidate	Votes	%	±%
Labor	Peter Tinley	15,576	66.1	+11.3
Liberal	Barry Jones	4,525	19.2	−9.3
Greens	Felicity Townsend	2,197	9.3	−1.9
No Mandatory Vaccination	Susan Poole	507	2.2	+2.2
One Nation	Mark Dalrymple	434	1.8	+1.8
Liberal Democrats	Michael Mitchell	310	1.3	+1.3
Total formal votes		23,549	96.3	+1.1
Informal votes		906	3.7	−1.1
Turnout		24,455	86.1	−2.8
Two-party-preferred result
Labor	Peter Tinley	18,156	77.1	+9.5
Liberal	Barry Jones	5,387	22.9	−9.5
Labor hold		Swing	+9.5	
