= O'Connor ministry =

Ministry of government of Western Australia

The O'Connor Ministry was the 28th Ministry of the Government of Western Australia, and was led by Liberal Premier Ray O'Connor and his deputy Cyril Rushton. It succeeded the Court Ministry on 25 January 1982, upon the retirement of Sir Charles Court from politics. The ministry was in turn followed by the Burke Ministry on 25 February 1983 after the Liberal Party lost government at the state election held on 19 February.

== Overview ==
Ray O'Connor, who had been in parliament since 1959 and first appointed as a Minister in 1967, had replaced Des O'Neil as Deputy Premier upon the latter's retirement from politics at the 1980 election. On 18 December 1981, Sir Charles Court, then 70 years of age, announced his decision that he would step down as Premier on 25 January 1982. O'Connor was elected unopposed by the party room to replace him.

The final term of the preceding Court Ministry had been somewhat troubled due in part to the inconsistent support of Liberal MLA Tom Dadour and the 1978 split of the National Country Party, with a breakaway National Party maintaining an independent line and holding three seats. A range of issues in several portfolios, most notably Aboriginal affairs and education, had received public prominence.

Of the former Court ministry, 10 of the 13 ministers retained office—Sir Charles Court, Bill Grayden and David Wordsworth resigned, and backbenchers Bob Pike, Jim Clarko and Richard Shalders were promoted. The latter two were initially Honorary Ministers, but were fully promoted on 14 May 1982.

== The Ministry ==
On 25 January 1982, the Governor, Sir Richard Trowbridge, constituted the Ministry. He designated 13 principal executive offices of the Government and appointed the following ministers to their positions, who served until the end of the Ministry on 25 February 1983. Two honorary ministers, Jim Clarko and Richard Shalders, were appointed to assist ministers in various portfolios, and on 14 May 1982, they fully assumed the portfolios. This was done pursuant to the Constitution Acts Amendment Act 1980 (No.5 of 1980), assented on 9 September 1980, which had grown the Ministry from 13 to 15.

The list below is ordered by decreasing seniority within the Cabinet, as indicated by the Government Gazette and the Hansard index. Blue entries indicate members of the Liberal Party, whilst green entries indicate members of the National Country Party. The members of the Ministry were:

Office	Minister
Premier; Treasurer; Minister Co-ordinating Economic and Social Development	Ray O'Connor, MLA
Deputy Premier; Minister for Transport; Minister for Emergency Services	Cyril Rushton, MLA
Minister for Agriculture; Minister for Primary Industry; Minister for Fisheries and Wildlife	Dick Old, MLA
Attorney-General; Minister for Federal Affairs; Minister for Police (from 30 December 1982); Leader of the Government in the Legislative Council	Ian Medcalf, ED, QC, LL.B., MLC
Minister for Works; Minister for Water Resources; Minister for Education (until 14 May 1982); Minister assisting the Minister Co-ordinating; Economic and Regional Development	Andrew Mensaros, MLA
Minister for Resources Development; Minister for Mines; Minister for Fuel and Energy	Peter Jones, MLA
Minister for Health (until 14 May 1982:) Minister for Community Welfare Minister for Housing Minister for Consumer Affairs	Ray Young, Dip.Acctg, MLA
(until 30 December 1982:) Minister for Police Minister for Prisons Minister assisting the Minister for Emergency Services (from 30 December 1982:) Minister for Employment	Bill Hassell, LL.B., MA, MLA
Minister for Labour and Industry; Minister for Immigration	Gordon Masters, MLC
Minister for Local Government; Minister for Urban Development and Town Planning	June Craig, MLA
Minister for Lands; Minister for Forests; Minister for Conservation and the Environment	Ian Laurance, Dip.Teach, BA, FAIM, MLA
(until 11 June 1982:) Minister for Industrial Development and Commerce Minister for Regional Administration and the North-West Minister for Tourism (from 11 June to 16 August 1982:) Minister for Industrial, Commercial and Regional Development Minister for Tourism (from 15 August 1982:) Minister for Industrial, Commercial and Regional Development Minister for the North-West Minister for Tourism	Barry MacKinnon, BEc, Dip.Acctg, FASA, MLA
Chief Secretary; Minister for Prisons (from 30 December 1982); Minister for Cultural Affairs; Minister for Recreation	Bob Pike, MLC
(until 14 May 1982:) Honorary Minister Assisting the Minister in the Portfolio of Education (from 14 May 1982:) Minister for Education	Jim Clarko, BA, DipEd, MA, MLA
(until 14 May 1982:); Honorary Minister Assisting the: Minister for Community Welfare Minister for Housing Minister for Consumer Affairs (from 14 May 1982:) Minister for Community Welfare Minister for Housing Minister for Consumer Affairs	Richard Shalders, Dip.Teach, MLA

Preceded by Court Ministry	O'Connor Ministry; 1982-1983	Succeeded by Burke Ministry
