= Court ministry =

The Court ministry was the 27th ministry of the Government of Western Australia, led by Liberal Premier Sir Charles Court and deputy Des O'Neil (Ray O'Connor replaced O'Neil following his retirement in 1980). It commenced on 5 June 1975, following the Court–McPharlin Ministry, 15 months after the Coalition's electoral defeat of the Tonkin Labor government. It was followed by the O'Connor Ministry upon Court's retirement as Premier on 25 January 1982.

== Overview ==
On 20 May 1975, the National Country Party (NCP), led by Ray McPharlin, withdrew from the Coalition. At the time, three Ministers had been members of the NCP. In the ensuing negotiations which included visits from Federal Country Party leader Doug Anthony and Queensland Premier Joh Bjelke-Petersen, Dick Old replaced McPharlin as state party leader. The Coalition recommenced on 31 May. Court felt that Old had insufficient experience to become Deputy Premier, so while the Government was based on a Liberal-NCP coalition until its defeat by Labor in 1983, both the Premier and Deputy positions were held by members of the parliamentary Liberal Party.

The Ministry was reconstituted three times – first on 10 March 1977, following the 1977 election; on 25 August 1978 after a portfolio reshuffle; and finally on 5 March 1980 following the 1980 election.

The 1977 election, which expanded the Legislative Assembly from 51 to 55 members, saw the Liberal Party gain four seats and come within one seat of being able to govern in their own right. The NCP made the abolition of probate on estates passing to a spouse a condition of forming a coalition with the Liberals. This change in government policy was announced by the Premier after the election. However, due to a reduction in the numbers of NCP members in the Parliament, the NCP's allocation of Ministerial positions in the 13-member Ministry, went from 3 to 2, with the loss of Norm Baxter. Neil McNeill retired from the Ministry, allowing Ian Medcalf to be appointed Attorney-General.

On 24 July 1978, Bill Grayden resigned from the Ministry after pleading guilty to two charges of unlawful assault on police officers, and one of unlawful damage to a police car. Ray O'Connor was appointed as Acting Minister covering all three of Grayden's portfolios and was formally sworn in by the Governor on 7 August 1978. Ray Young was promoted to the Ministry. A number of significant portfolio changes occurred on 25 August 1978, resulting from a split within the NCP leading to half of its MP's, along with its state president, forming a breakaway National Party. Both of the NCP Ministers stayed with the original party.

The 1980 election, which saw little parliamentary change other than the defeat of Housing Minister Alan Ridge in his Kimberley seat and the retirement of Deputy Premier Des O'Neil from politics, preceded another reconstitution of the Ministry. Ray O'Connor, who had been a member of parliament since 1959, was promoted to the Deputy Premiership whilst two new Ministers were appointed and two Honorary Ministers were appointed. The Government failed to enact legislation which would have amended the Constitution to allow an expansion of the Ministry to 15, on account of maverick Liberal MLA Tom Dadour and the National Party opposing the measure.

On 18 December 1981, Sir Charles Court, then 70 years of age, announced his decision that he would step down as Premier on 25 January 1982. The ministry ended on that date and was succeeded by the O'Connor Ministry.

== Ministry ==
=== First Ministry ===
On 5 June 1975, the Governor, Air Commodore Sir Hughie Edwards, designated 12 principal executive offices of the Government under section 43(2) of the Constitution Acts Amendment Act 1899. The following ministers were then appointed to the positions, and served until the reconstitution of the Ministry on 10 March 1977. An honorary minister was appointed two weeks later; following the assent of the Constitution Acts Amendment Act (No.4) 1975 (No.86 of 1975) on 20 November 1975, the Ministry grew to 13 members and Ian Medcalf was formally appointed on 22 December.

The list below is ordered by decreasing seniority within the Cabinet, as indicated by the Government Gazette and the Hansard index. Blue entries indicate members of the Liberal Party, whilst green entries indicate members of the National Country Party. The members of the Ministry were:

Office	Minister
Premier and Treasurer; Minister Co-ordinating Economic and Social Development; Minister for Federal Affairs (until 22 December 1975)	Sir Charles Court, OBE, Dip.Acctg., FCA, FICS, FASA, MLA
Deputy Premier; Minister for Works; Minister for Water Supplies; Minister for the North-West	Des O'Neil, DipEd, MLA
Chief Secretary; Minister for Justice; Leader of the Government in the Legislative Council	Neil McNeill, BSc (Agric), MLC
Minister for Agriculture	Dick Old, MLA
Minister for Transport; Minister for Police; Minister for Traffic	Ray O'Connor, MLA
Minister for Education; Minister for Cultural Affairs; Minister for Recreation	Graham MacKinnon, ED, JP, MLC
Minister for Labour and Industry; Minister for Consumer Affairs; Minister for Immigration	Bill Grayden, MLA
Minister for Industrial Development; Minister for Mines; Minister for Fuel and Energy	Andrew Mensaros, MLA
Minister for Local Government; Minister for Urban Development and Town Planning	Cyril Rushton, MLA
Minister for Lands; Minister for Forests; Minister for Tourism	Alan Ridge, MLA
Minister for Health; Minister for Community Welfare	Norm Baxter, MLC
Minister for Housing; Minister for Conservation and Environment; Minister for Fisheries and Wildlife	Peter Jones, MLA
Honorary Minister (19 June 1975 – 22 December 1975); Minister for Federal Affairs (from 22 December 1975)	Ian Medcalf, ED, QC, LL.B., MLC

=== Second Ministry ===
On 10 March 1977, the Governor, Air Chief Marshal Sir Wallace Kyle, designated 13 principal executive offices of the Government under section 43(2) of the Constitution Acts Amendment Act 1899 and appointed the ministers to the positions.

On 24 July 1978, Bill Grayden resigned from the Ministry. Ray O'Connor was appointed the Acting Minister for all three portfolios, and was sworn into them on 7 August 1978. Ray Young was also promoted to the Ministry at this time. These arrangements stayed in place until 25 August reshuffle.

Office	Minister
Premier and Treasurer; Minister Co-ordinating Economic and Social Development	Sir Charles Court, OBE, Dip.Acctg., FCA, FICS, FASA, MLA
Deputy Premier; Chief Secretary; Minister for Police and Traffic; Minister for Regional Administration; Minister for the North-West	Des O'Neil, DipEd, MLA
Minister for Agriculture	Dick Old, MLA
Minister for Fisheries and Wildlife; Minister for Tourism; Minister for Conservation and Environment; Leader of the Government in the Legislative Council	Graham MacKinnon, ED, JP, MLC
Minister for Works; Minister for Water Supplies; Minister for Housing (from 7 August 1978, acting from 24 July:) Minister for Labour and Industry Minister for Consumer Affairs Minister for Immigration	Ray O'Connor, MLA
Minister for Labour and Industry; Minister for Consumer Affairs; Minister for Immigration	Bill Grayden, MLA (until 24 July 1978)
Attorney-General; Minister for Federal Affairs	Ian Medcalf, ED, QC, LL.B., MLC
Minister for Education; Minister for Cultural Affairs; Minister for Recreation	Peter Jones, MLA
Minister for Industrial Development; Minister for Mines; Minister for Fuel and Energy	Andrew Mensaros, MLA
Minister for Local Government; Minister for Urban Development and Town Planning	Cyril Rushton, MLA
Minister for Health; Minister for Community Welfare	Alan Ridge, MLA
Minister for Transport	David Wordsworth, MLC
Minister for Lands and Forests	June Craig, MLA
Minister without portfolio	Ray Young, MLA (from 7 August 1978)

=== Third Ministry ===
On 25 August 1978, the Governor, Air Chief Marshal Sir Wallace Kyle, designated 13 principal executive offices of the Government under section 43(2) of the Constitution Acts Amendment Act 1899. The following ministers were then appointed to the positions, and served until the reconstitution of the Ministry on 5 March 1980 following the 1980 state election.

Office	Minister
Premier and Treasurer; Minister Co-ordinating Economic and Social Development	Sir Charles Court, OBE, Dip.Acctg., FCA, FICS, FASA, MLA
Deputy Premier; Chief Secretary; Minister for Police and Traffic; Minister for Regional Administration; Minister for the North-West	Des O'Neil, DipEd, MLA
Minister for Agriculture	Dick Old, MLA
Minister for Works; Minister for Water Supplies; Minister for Tourism; Leader of the Government in the Legislative Council	Graham MacKinnon, ED, JP, MLC
Minister for Labour and Industry; Minister for Consumer Affairs; Minister for Immigration; Minister for Fisheries and Wildlife; Minister for Conservation and Environment	Ray O'Connor, MLA
Attorney-General; Minister for Federal Affairs	Ian Medcalf, ED, QC, LL.B., MLC
Minister for Education; Minister for Cultural Affairs; Minister for Recreation	Peter Jones, MLA
Minister for Industrial Development; Minister for Mines; Minister for Fuel and Energy	Andrew Mensaros, MLA
Minister for Transport	Cyril Rushton, MLA
Minister for Housing	Alan Ridge, MLA
Minister for Lands and Forests	David Wordsworth, MLC
Minister for Local Government; Minister for Urban Development and Town Planning	June Craig, MLA
Minister for Health; Minister for Community Welfare	Ray Young, MLA

=== Fourth Ministry ===
On 5 March 1980, the Governor, Air Chief Marshal Sir Wallace Kyle, designated 13 principal executive offices of the Government under section 43(2) of the Constitution Acts Amendment Act 1899. The following ministers were then appointed to the positions, and served until the end of the Ministry on 25 January 1982, when the O'Connor Ministry was formed by Deputy Premier Ray O'Connor upon the Premier's retirement.

Office	Minister
Premier and Treasurer; Minister Co-ordinating Economic and Social Development	Sir Charles Court, OBE, Dip.Acctg., FCA, FICS, FASA, MLA
Deputy Premier; Minister for Labour and Industry; Minister for Consumer Affairs; Minister for Immigration (until 12 February 1981:) Minister for Regional Administration Minister for the North-West Minister for Tourism	Ray O'Connor, MLA
Minister for Agriculture	Dick Old, MLA
Attorney-General; Minister for Federal Affairs; Leader of the Government in the Legislative Council	Ian Medcalf, ED, QC, LL.B., MLC
Minister for Works; Minister for Water Resources; Minister assisting the Minister Co-ordinating; Economic and Social Development; Minister for Housing (until 12 February 1981)	Andrew Mensaros, MLA
Minister for Resources Development; Minister for Mines; Minister for Fuel and Energy; Minister for Industrial Development and Commerce (from 12 February 1981:) Minister for Housing Minister for Regional Administration Minister for the North-West Minister for Tourism	Peter Jones, MLA
Minister for Transport	Cyril Rushton, MLA
Minister for Health	Ray Young, MLA
Minister for Education; Minister for Cultural Affairs; Minister for Recreation	Bill Grayden, MLA
Minister for Lands and Forests	David Wordsworth, MLC
Minister for Local Government; Minister for Urban Development and Town Planning	June Craig, MLA
Chief Secretary; Minister for Police and Traffic; Minister for Community Welfare	Bill Hassell, LL.B., MA, MLA
Minister for Fisheries and Wildlife; Minister for Conservation and Environment	Gordon Masters, MLC
Honorary Minister assisting the Ministers for Housing, Regional Administration, North West and Tourism	Ian Laurance, Dip.Teach, BA, FAIM, MLA
Honorary Minister assisting the Minister for Industrial Development and Commerce	Barry MacKinnon, BEc, Dip.Acctg, FASA, MLA

== Listed by name and portfolio ==
Minister	Office	Appointed	Ended
Baxter, Norm (MLC)	Minister for Health	5 June 1975	10 March 1977
Baxter, Norm (MLC)	Minister for Community Welfare	5 June 1975	10 March 1977
Court, Charles (MLA)	Premier and Treasurer	5 June 1975	25 January 1982
Court, Charles (MLA)	Minister Co-ordinating Economic and Social Development	5 June 1975	25 January 1982
Court, Charles (MLA)	Minister for Federal Affairs	5 June 1975	22 December 1975
Craig, June (MLA)	Minister for Lands and Forests	10 March 1977	25 August 1978
Craig, June (MLA)	Minister for Local Government	25 August 1978	25 January 1982
Craig, June (MLA)	Minister for Urban Development and Town Planning	25 August 1978	25 January 1982
Grayden, Bill (MLA)	Minister for Labour and Industry	5 June 1975	24 July 1978
Grayden, Bill (MLA)	Minister for Consumer Affairs	5 June 1975	24 July 1978
Grayden, Bill (MLA)	Minister for Immigration	5 June 1975	24 July 1978
Grayden, Bill (MLA)	Minister for Education	5 March 1980	25 January 1982
Grayden, Bill (MLA)	Minister for Cultural Affairs	5 March 1980	25 January 1982
Grayden, Bill (MLA)	Minister for Recreation	5 March 1980	25 January 1982
Hassell, Bill (MLA)	Chief Secretary	5 March 1980	25 January 1982
Hassell, Bill (MLA)	Minister for Police and Traffic	5 March 1980	25 January 1982
Hassell, Bill (MLA)	Minister for Community Welfare	5 March 1980	25 January 1982
Jones, Peter (MLA)	Minister for Housing	5 June 1975	10 March 1977
Jones, Peter (MLA)	Minister for Conservation and Environment	5 June 1975	10 March 1977
Jones, Peter (MLA)	Minister for Fisheries and Wildlife	5 June 1975	10 March 1977
Jones, Peter (MLA)	Minister for Education	10 March 1977	5 March 1980
Jones, Peter (MLA)	Minister for Cultural Affairs	10 March 1977	5 March 1980
Jones, Peter (MLA)	Minister for Recreation	10 March 1977	5 March 1980
Jones, Peter (MLA)	Minister for Regional Administration	12 February 1981	25 January 1982
Jones, Peter (MLA)	Minister for the North-West	12 February 1981	25 January 1982
Jones, Peter (MLA)	Minister for Tourism	12 February 1981	25 January 1982
Jones, Peter (MLA)	Minister for Resources Development	5 March 1980	25 January 1982
Jones, Peter (MLA)	Minister for Mines	5 March 1980	25 January 1982
Jones, Peter (MLA)	Minister for Fuel and Energy	5 March 1980	25 January 1982
Jones, Peter (MLA)	Minister for Industrial Development and Commerce	5 March 1980	25 January 1982
Jones, Peter (MLA)	Minister for Housing	12 February 1981	25 January 1982
Laurance, Ian (MLA)	Honorary Minister	5 March 1980	25 January 1982
MacKinnon, Barry (MLA)	Honorary Minister	5 March 1980	25 January 1982
MacKinnon, Graham (MLC)	Minister for Education	5 June 1975	10 March 1977
MacKinnon, Graham (MLC)	Minister for Cultural Affairs	5 June 1975	10 March 1977
MacKinnon, Graham (MLC)	Minister for Recreation	5 June 1975	10 March 1977
MacKinnon, Graham (MLC)	Leader of the Government in the Legislative Council	10 March 1977	5 March 1980
MacKinnon, Graham (MLC)	Minister for Fisheries and Wildlife	10 March 1977	25 August 1978
MacKinnon, Graham (MLC)	Minister for Conservation and Environment	10 March 1977	25 August 1978
MacKinnon, Graham (MLC)	Minister for Works	10 March 1977	5 March 1980
MacKinnon, Graham (MLC)	Minister for Water Supplies	25 August 1978	5 March 1980
MacKinnon, Graham (MLC)	Minister for Tourism	25 August 1978	5 March 1980
McNeill, Neil (MLC)	Chief Secretary	5 June 1975	10 March 1977
McNeill, Neil (MLC)	Minister for Justice	5 June 1975	10 March 1977
McNeill, Neil (MLC)	Leader of the Government in the Legislative Council	5 June 1975	10 March 1977
Masters, Gordon	Minister for Fisheries and Wildlife	5 March 1980	25 January 1982
Masters, Gordon (MLC)	Minister for Conservation and Environment	5 March 1980	25 January 1982
Medcalf, Ian (MLC)	Honorary Minister	19 June 1975	22 December 1975
Medcalf, Ian (MLC)	Attorney-General	10 March 1977	25 January 1982
Medcalf, Ian (MLC)	Minister for Federal Affairs	22 December 1975	25 January 1982
Medcalf, Ian (MLC)	Leader of the Government in the Legislative Council	5 March 1980	25 January 1982
Mensaros, Andrew (MLA)	Minister for Industrial Development	5 June 1975	5 March 1980
Mensaros, Andrew (MLA)	Minister for Mines	5 June 1975	5 March 1980
Mensaros, Andrew (MLA)	Minister for Fuel and Energy	5 June 1975	5 March 1980
Mensaros, Andrew (MLA)	Minister for Works	5 March 1980	25 January 1982
Mensaros, Andrew (MLA)	Minister for Water Supplies	5 March 1980	25 January 1982
Mensaros, Andrew (MLA)	Minister assisting the Minister; Co-ordinating Economic and Social Development	5 March 1980	25 January 1982
Mensaros, Andrew (MLA)	Minister for Housing	5 March 1980	12 February 1981
O'Connor, Ray (MLA)	Deputy Premier	5 March 1980	25 January 1982
O'Connor, Ray (MLA)	Minister for Transport	5 June 1975	10 March 1977
O'Connor, Ray (MLA)	Minister for Police	5 June 1975	10 March 1977
O'Connor, Ray (MLA)	Minister for Traffic	5 June 1975	10 March 1977
O'Connor, Ray (MLA)	Minister for Works	10 March 1977	25 August 1978
O'Connor, Ray (MLA)	Minister for Water Supplies	10 March 1977	25 August 1978
O'Connor, Ray (MLA)	Minister for Housing	10 March 1977	25 August 1978
O'Connor, Ray (MLA)	Minister for Labour and Industry	7 August 1978	25 January 1982
O'Connor, Ray (MLA)	Minister for Consumer Affairs	7 August 1978	25 January 1982
O'Connor, Ray (MLA)	Minister for Immigration	7 August 1978	25 January 1982
O'Connor, Ray (MLA)	Minister for Fisheries and Wildlife	25 August 1978	5 March 1980
O'Connor, Ray (MLA)	Minister for Conservation and Environment	25 August 1978	5 March 1980
O'Connor, Ray (MLA)	Minister for Regional Administration	5 March 1980	12 February 1981
O'Connor, Ray (MLA)	Minister for the North-West	5 March 1980	12 February 1981
O'Connor, Ray (MLA)	Minister for Tourism	5 March 1980	12 February 1981
O'Neil, Des (MLA)	Deputy Premier	5 June 1975	5 March 1980
Old, Dick (MLA)	Minister for Agriculture	5 June 1975	25 January 1982
O'Neil, Des (MLA)	Chief Secretary	10 March 1977	5 March 1980
O'Neil, Des (MLA)	Minister for Police and Traffic	10 March 1977	5 March 1980
O'Neil, Des (MLA)	Minister for Regional Administration	10 March 1977	5 March 1980
O'Neil, Des (MLA)	Minister for Water Supplies	5 June 1975	10 March 1977
O'Neil, Des (MLA)	Minister for Works	5 June 1975	10 March 1977
O'Neil, Des (MLA)	Minister for the North-West	5 June 1975	5 March 1980
Ridge, Alan (MLA)	Minister for Lands	5 June 1975	10 March 1977
Ridge, Alan (MLA)	Minister for Forests	5 June 1975	10 March 1977
Ridge, Alan (MLA)	Minister for Tourism	5 June 1975	10 March 1977
Ridge, Alan (MLA)	Minister for Health	10 March 1977	25 August 1978
Ridge, Alan (MLA)	Minister for Community Welfare	10 March 1977	25 August 1978
Ridge, Alan (MLA)	Minister for Housing	25 August 1978	5 March 1980
Rushton, Cyril (MLA)	Minister for Local Government	5 June 1975	25 August 1978
Rushton, Cyril (MLA)	Minister for Urban Development and Town Planning	5 June 1975	25 August 1978
Rushton, Cyril (MLA)	Minister for Transport	25 August 1978	25 January 1982
Wordsworth, David (MLC)	Minister for Transport	10 March 1977	25 August 1978
Wordsworth, David (MLC)	Minister for Lands and Forests	25 August 1978	25 January 1982
Young, Ray (MLA)	Minister without portfolio	7 August 1978	25 August 1978
Young, Ray (MLA)	Minister for Health	25 August 1978	25 January 1982
Young, Ray (MLA)	Minister for Community Welfare	25 August 1978	5 March 1980

Preceded by Court–McPharlin Ministry	Court Ministry; 1975–1982	Succeeded by O'Connor Ministry
