= Results of the 1974 Western Australian state election (Legislative Assembly) =

Western Australian state election, 30 March 1974 Legislative Assembly << 1971–1977 >>
Enrolled voters	597,335^{[1]}				
Votes cast	538,365		Turnout	90.13%	–1.18%
Informal votes	21,966		Informal	4.08%	+0.23%
Summary of votes by party
Party	Primary votes	%	Swing	Seats	Change
Liberal	208,288	40.33%	+10.67%	23	+ 6
Labor	248,395	48.10%	–0.81%	22	– 4
Alliance (CP/DLP)^{[2]}	55,746	10.80%	–5.55%	6	– 2
Australia Party	2,052	0.40%	+0.36%	0	± 0
Independent	1,918	0.37%	–2.91%	0	± 0
Total	516,399			51	
Two-party-preferred
Liberal/NA	262,621	50.17%	+2.50%		
Labor	260,805	49.83%	–2.50%		

This is a list of electoral district results of the 1974 Western Australian election.

== Results by electoral district ==
=== Albany ===
1974 Western Australian state election: Albany
Party	Candidate	Votes	%	±%
Labor	Wyndham Cook	3,075	44.5	
Liberal	Leo Watt	2,726	39.4	
National Alliance	Leslie Dean	1,111	16.1	
Total formal votes		6,912	96.6	
Informal votes		244	3.4	
Turnout		7,156	91.8	
Two-party-preferred result
Liberal	Leo Watt	3,667	53.0	
Labor	Wyndham Cook	3,245	47.0	
Liberal gain from Labor		Swing		

=== Ascot ===
1974 Western Australian state election: Ascot
Party	Candidate	Votes	%	±%
Labor	Mal Bryce	8,912	67.2	
Liberal	Robert Carter	4,345	32.8	
Total formal votes		13,257	95.2	
Informal votes		663	4.8	
Turnout		13,920	90.4	
Labor hold		Swing		

=== Avon ===
1974 Western Australian state election: Avon
Party	Candidate	Votes	%	±%
Labor	Ken McIver	3,542	50.5	
Liberal	Owen Bloomfield	1,777	25.3	
National Alliance	Albert Llewellyn	1,692	24.1	
Total formal votes		7,011	98.0	
Informal votes		140	2.0	
Turnout		7,151	92.2	
Two-party-preferred result
Labor	Ken McIver	3,796	54.1	
Liberal	Owen Bloomfield	3,215	45.9	
Labor hold		Swing		

=== Balga ===
1974 Western Australian state election: Balga
Party	Candidate	Votes	%	±%
Labor	Brian Burke	8,761	62.0	
Liberal	Neil Beck	4,499	31.8	
National Alliance	Kenneth Austin	506	3.6	
Independent	Ralph Brockman	368	2.6	
Total formal votes		14,134	95.9	
Informal votes		601	4.1	
Turnout		14,735	93.7	
Two-party-preferred result
Labor	Brian Burke	9,021	63.8	
Liberal	Neil Beck	5,113	36.2	
Labor hold		Swing		

=== Boulder-Dundas ===
1974 Western Australian state election: Boulder-Dundas
Party	Candidate	Votes	%	±%
Labor	Tom Hartrey	3,770	61.8	
Liberal	Eric Bingley	1,751	28.7	
National Alliance	John Madden	584	9.6	
Total formal votes		6,105	92.2	
Informal votes		519	7.8	
Turnout		6,624	86.4	
Two-party-preferred result
Labor	Tom Hartrey	3,858	63.2	
Liberal	Eric Bingley	2,247	36.8	
Labor hold		Swing		

=== Bunbury ===
1974 Western Australian state election: Bunbury
Party	Candidate	Votes	%	±%
Liberal	John Sibson	3,705	50.3	
Labor	Robert Wells	3,657	49.7	
Total formal votes		7,362	97.7	
Informal votes		174	2.3	
Turnout		7,536	94.9	
Liberal hold		Swing		

=== Canning ===
1974 Western Australian state election: Canning
Party	Candidate	Votes	%	±%
Labor	Tom Bateman	10,283	54.6	
Liberal	John Sinclair	7,145	37.9	
National Alliance	Paul Clune	1,010	5.4	
Australia	Robert Russell-Brown	394	2.1	
Total formal votes		18,832	96.3	
Informal votes		725	3.7	
Turnout		19,557	91.5	
Two-party-preferred result
Labor	Tom Bateman	10,582	56.2	
Liberal	John Sinclair	8,250	43.8	
Labor hold		Swing		

=== Clontarf ===
1974 Western Australian state election: Clontarf
Party	Candidate	Votes	%	±%
Labor	Donald May	7,452	50.8	
Liberal	Tony Williams	6,168	42.0	
National Alliance	Anne-Marie Loney	1,056	7.2	
Total formal votes		14,676	97.2	
Informal votes		420	2.8	
Turnout		15,096	90.5	
Two-party-preferred result
Labor	Donald May	7,610	51.9	
Liberal	Tony Williams	7,066	48.1	
Labor hold		Swing		

=== Cockburn ===
1974 Western Australian state election: Cockburn
Party	Candidate	Votes	%	±%
Labor	Don Taylor	10,058	70.3	
Liberal	Lloyd Read-Brain	3,531	24.7	
National Alliance	Clifford Webb	712	5.0	
Total formal votes		14,301	7.1	
Informal votes		1,100	7.1	
Turnout		15,401	89.5	
Two-party-preferred result
Labor	Don Taylor	10,165	71.1	
Liberal	Lloyd Read-Brain	4,136	28.9	
Labor hold		Swing		

=== Collie ===
1974 Western Australian state election: Collie
Party	Candidate	Votes	%	±%
Labor	Tom Jones	3,943	56.1	
National Alliance	Hilda Turnbull	1,619	23.0	
Liberal	Brian Menzies	1,465	20.9	
Total formal votes		7,027	97.2	
Informal votes		205	2.8	
Turnout		7,232	93.8	
Two-party-preferred result
Labor	Tom Jones	4,186	59.6	
National Alliance	Hilda Turnbull	2,841	40.4	
Labor hold		Swing		

=== Cottesloe ===
1974 Western Australian state election: Cottesloe
Party	Candidate	Votes	%	±%
Liberal	Ross Hutchinson	7,233	52.7	
Labor	Graham Rattigan	5,438	39.6	
National Alliance	Oldham Prestage	726	5.3	
Australia	Charles Pierce	338	2.5	
Total formal votes		13,735	97.0	
Informal votes		430	3.0	
Turnout		14,165	88.4	
Two-party-preferred result
Liberal	Ross Hutchinson	8,019	58.4	
Labor	Graham Rattigan	5,716	41.6	
Liberal hold		Swing		

=== Dale ===
1974 Western Australian state election: Dale
Party	Candidate	Votes	%	±%
Liberal	Cyril Rushton	4,730	51.0	
Labor	Reginald Ewers	3,944	42.5	
National Alliance	June Fitzgerald	598	6.5	
Total formal votes		9,272	94.6	
Informal votes		532	5.4	
Turnout		9,804	91.6	
Two-party-preferred result
Liberal	Cyril Rushton	5,238	56.5	
Labor	Reginald Ewers	4,034	43.5	
Liberal hold		Swing		

=== East Melville ===
1974 Western Australian state election: East Melville
Party	Candidate	Votes	%	±%
Liberal	Des O'Neil	8,029	52.8	
Labor	Percy Johnson	6,079	40.0	
National Alliance	Rosemary Taboni	1,097	7.2	
Total formal votes		15,205	97.1	
Informal votes		452	2.9	
Turnout		15,657	91.4	
Two-party-preferred result
Liberal	Des O'Neil	8,961	58.9	
Labor	Percy Johnson	6,244	41.1	
Liberal hold		Swing		

=== Floreat ===
1974 Western Australian state election: Floreat
Party	Candidate	Votes	%	±%
Liberal	Andrew Mensaros	8,407	56.6	
Labor	Peter Coyle	5,012	33.8	
National Alliance	Peter McGowan	1,421	9.6	
Total formal votes		14,840	97.6	
Informal votes		366	2.4	
Turnout		15,206	91.4	
Two-party-preferred result
Liberal	Andrew Mensaros	9,615	64.8	
Labor	Peter Coyle	5,225	35.2	
Liberal hold		Swing		

=== Fremantle ===
1974 Western Australian state election: Fremantle
Party	Candidate	Votes	%	±%
Labor	Harry Fletcher	8,742	65.2	
Liberal	Michael Coakley	3,802	28.3	
National Alliance	Peter Moorhouse	869	6.5	
Total formal votes		13,413	91.4	
Informal votes		1,258	8.6	
Turnout		14,671	88.6	
Two-party-preferred result
Labor	Harry Fletcher	8,872	66.1	
Liberal	Michael Coakley	4,541	33.9	
Labor hold		Swing		

=== Gascoyne ===
1974 Western Australian state election: Gascoyne
Party	Candidate	Votes	%	±%
Liberal	Ian Laurance	1,610	50.5	
Labor	Frank Davis	955	30.0	
National Alliance	Wilson Tuckey	511	16.0	
Independent	Robert Phillips	111	3.5	
Total formal votes		3,187	95.3	
Informal votes		156	4.7	
Turnout		3,343	88.0	
Two-party-preferred result
Liberal	Ian Laurance	2,100	65.9	
Labor	Frank Davis	1,087	34.1	
Liberal gain from Labor		Swing		

=== Geraldton ===
1974 Western Australian state election: Geraldton
Party	Candidate	Votes	%	±%
Labor	Jeff Carr	3,318	47.5	
Liberal	Joseph Willoughby	2,236	32.0	
Independent	Phillip Cooper	997	14.3	
National Alliance	Victor Askew	431	6.2	
Total formal votes		6,982	96.9	
Informal votes		224	3.1	
Turnout		7,206	89.6	
Two-party-preferred result
Labor	Jeff Carr	3,862	55.3	
Liberal	Joseph Willoughby	3,120	44.7	
Labor hold		Swing		

=== Greenough ===
1974 Western Australian state election: Greenough
Party	Candidate	Votes	%	±%
Liberal	David Brand	4,999	78.8	
Labor	Frederic Newman	1,343	21.2	
Total formal votes		6,342	97.3	
Informal votes		176	2.7	
Turnout		6,518	89.5	
Liberal hold		Swing		

=== Kalamunda ===
1974 Western Australian state election: Kalamunda
Party	Candidate	Votes	%	±%
Liberal	Ian Thompson	4,521	54.9	
Labor	Michael Marsh	2,917	35.4	
National Alliance	Benjamin Ballantyne	643	7.8	
Independent	Francesco Nesci	153	1.9	
Total formal votes		8,234	97.0	
Informal votes		253	3.0	
Turnout		8,487	90.7	
Two-party-preferred result
Liberal	Ian Thompson	5,149	62.5	
Labor	Michael Marsh	3,085	37.5	
Liberal hold		Swing		

=== Kalgoorlie ===
1974 Western Australian state election: Kalgoorlie
Party	Candidate	Votes	%	±%
Labor	Tom Evans	3,623	62.1	
Liberal	Max Finlayson	1,867	32.0	
National Alliance	Geoffrey Sands	346	5.9	
Total formal votes		5,836	92.8	
Informal votes		455	7.2	
Turnout		6,291	88.7	
Two-party-preferred result
Labor	Tom Evans	3,675	63.0	
Liberal	Max Finlayson	2,161	37.0	
Labor hold		Swing		

=== Karrinyup ===
1974 Western Australian state election: Karrinyup
Party	Candidate	Votes	%	±%
Liberal	Jim Clarko	8,782	48.7	
Labor	Mervyn Knight	8,090	44.9	
National Alliance	Laurence Butterly	1,145	6.4	
Total formal votes		18,017	96.3	
Informal votes		695	3.7	
Turnout		18,712	91.5	
Two-party-preferred result
Liberal	Jim Clarko	9,728	54.0	
Labor	Mervyn Knight	8,289	46.0	
Liberal gain from Labor		Swing		

=== Katanning ===
1974 Western Australian state election: Katanning
Party	Candidate	Votes	%	±%
National Alliance	Dick Old	4,307	63.2	
Labor	Kenneth Gawn	1,333	19.6	
Liberal	Peter Hatherly	1,174	17.2	
Total formal votes		6,814	97.1	
Informal votes		203	2.9	
Turnout		7,017	91.7	
Two-party-preferred result
National Alliance	Dick Old	5,364	78.7	
Labor	Kenneth Gawn	1,450	21.3	
National Alliance hold		Swing		

=== Kimberley ===
1974 Western Australian state election: Kimberley
Party	Candidate	Votes	%	±%
Liberal	Alan Ridge	1,785	54.6	
Labor	Robert Baker	1,327	40.6	
National Alliance	Keith Wright	156	4.8	
Total formal votes		3,268	94.7	
Informal votes		183	5.3	
Turnout		3,451	79.3	
Two-party-preferred result
Liberal	Alan Ridge	1,918	58.7	
Labor	Robert Baker	1,350	41.3	
Liberal hold		Swing		

=== Maylands ===
1974 Western Australian state election: Maylands
Party	Candidate	Votes	%	±%
Labor	John Harman	8,530	61.1	
Liberal	Pauline Iles	4,494	32.2	
National Alliance	Edward Barlow	949	6.8	
Total formal votes		13,973	95.0	
Informal votes		730	5.0	
Turnout		14,703	89.0	
Two-party-preferred result
Labor	John Harman	8,672	62.1	
Liberal	Pauline Iles	5,301	37.9	
Labor hold		Swing		

=== Melville ===
1974 Western Australian state election: Melville
Party	Candidate	Votes	%	±%
Labor	John Tonkin	9,742	68.9	
Liberal	Cedric Smith	3,801	26.9	
National Alliance	Barney Foley	605	4.3	
Total formal votes		14,148	96.8	
Informal votes		467	3.2	
Turnout		14,615	91.1	
Two-party-preferred result
Labor	John Tonkin	9,833	69.5	
Liberal	Cedric Smith	4,315	30.5	
Labor hold		Swing		

=== Merredin-Yilgarn ===
1974 Western Australian state election: Merredin-Yilgarn
Party	Candidate	Votes	%	±%
National Alliance	Hendy Cowan	2,585	39.6	
Labor	James Brown	2,536	38.8	
Liberal	Brian Cahill	1,411	21.6	
Total formal votes		6,532	96.8	
Informal votes		214	3.2	
Turnout		6,746	91.8	
Two-party-preferred result
National Alliance	Hendy Cowan	3,782	57.9	
Labor	James Brown	2,750	42.1	
National Alliance gain from Labor		Swing		

=== Moore ===
1974 Western Australian state election: Moore
Party	Candidate	Votes	%	±%
National Alliance	Bert Crane	4,248	67.7	
Liberal	Terence Millstead	2,026	32.3	
Total formal votes		6,274	94.6	
Informal votes		358	5.4	
Turnout		6,632	90.5	
National Alliance hold		Swing		

=== Morley ===
1974 Western Australian state election: Morley
Party	Candidate	Votes	%	±%
Labor	Arthur Tonkin	9,570	57.4	
Liberal	Lloyd Stewart	7,093	42.6	
Total formal votes		16,663	97.2	
Informal votes		478	2.8	
Turnout		17,141	92.1	
Labor hold		Swing		

=== Mount Hawthorn ===
1974 Western Australian state election: Mount Hawthorn
Party	Candidate	Votes	%	±%
Labor	Ron Bertram	7,447	54.7	
Liberal	Timothy Foley	5,256	38.6	
National Alliance	Peter Tilley	903	6.6	
Total formal votes		13,606	95.3	
Informal votes		663	4.7	
Turnout		14,269	90.6	
Two-party-preferred result
Labor	Ron Bertram	7,582	55.7	
Liberal	Timothy Foley	6,024	44.3	
Labor hold		Swing		

=== Mount Lawley ===
1974 Western Australian state election: Mount Lawley
Party	Candidate	Votes	%	±%
Liberal	Ray O'Connor	7,441	53.2	
Labor	Arthur Chauncy	5,608	40.1	
National Alliance	John Poole	949	6.8	
Total formal votes		13,998	95.6	
Informal votes		640	4.4	
Turnout		14,638	89.9	
Two-party-preferred result
Liberal	Ray O'Connor	8,247	58.9	
Labor	Arthur Chauncy	5,751	41.1	
Liberal hold		Swing		

=== Mount Marshall ===
1974 Western Australian state election: Mount Marshall
Party	Candidate	Votes	%	±%
National Alliance	Ray McPharlin	unopposed		
National Alliance hold		Swing		

=== Mundaring ===
1974 Western Australian state election: Mundaring
Party	Candidate	Votes	%	±%
Labor	James Moiler	4,119	54.5	
Liberal	Andrew Hugh	2,803	37.1	
National Alliance	Ivan Sands	640	8.5	
Total formal votes		7,562	97.4	
Informal votes		203	2.6	
Turnout		7,765	91.1	
Two-party-preferred result
Labor	James Moiler	4,215	55.7	
Liberal	Andrew Hugh	3,347	44.3	
Labor hold		Swing		

=== Murchison-Eyre ===
1974 Western Australian state election: Murchison-Eyre
Party	Candidate	Votes	%	±%
Liberal	Peter Coyne	1,022	57.0	
Labor	Julian Grill	770	43.0	
Total formal votes		1,792	97.4	
Informal votes		48	2.6	
Turnout		1,840	83.0	
Liberal hold		Swing		

=== Murray ===
1974 Western Australian state election: Murray
Party	Candidate	Votes	%	±%
Labor	Geoffrey Dix	3,409	45.5	
Liberal	Richard Shalders	3,241	43.2	
National Alliance	Wayne McRostie	848	11.3	
Total formal votes		7,498	96.9	
Informal votes		243	3.1	
Turnout		7,741	92.8	
Two-party-preferred result
Liberal	Richard Shalders	3,887	51.8	
Labor	Geoffrey Dix	3,611	48.2	
Liberal hold		Swing		

=== Narrogin ===
1974 Western Australian state election: Narrogin
Party	Candidate	Votes	%	±%
National Alliance	Peter Jones	3,593	50.9	
Liberal	Robert Farr	1,978	28.0	
Labor	Gordon Appleton	1,492	21.1	
Total formal votes		7,063	98.1	
Informal votes		140	1.9	
Turnout		7,203	92.4	
Two-party-preferred result
National Alliance	Peter Jones	4,936	69.9	
Labor	Gordon Appleton	2,127	30.1	
National Alliance hold		Swing		

- Preferences were not distributed between the National Alliance and Liberal candidates for Narrogin.

=== Nedlands ===
1974 Western Australian state election: Nedlands
Party	Candidate	Votes	%	±%
Liberal	Charles Court	9,103	66.8	
Labor	Christopher Thompson	4,516	33.2	
Total formal votes		13,619	97.9	
Informal votes		286	2.1	
Turnout		13,905	88.7	
Liberal hold		Swing		

=== Perth ===
1974 Western Australian state election: Perth
Party	Candidate	Votes	%	±%
Labor	Terry Burke	6,997	59.6	
Liberal	Julius Re	3,769	32.1	
National Alliance	Robert Burns	518	4.4	
Australia	William Barrett	456	3.9	
Total formal votes		11,740	92.6	
Informal votes		933	7.4	
Turnout		12,673	84.1	
Two-party-preferred result
Labor	Terry Burke	7,303	62.2	
Liberal	Julius Re	4,437	37.8	
Labor hold		Swing		

=== Pilbara ===
1974 Western Australian state election: Pilbara
Party	Candidate	Votes	%	±%
Liberal	Brian Sodeman	3,440	49.1	
Labor	Arthur Bickerton	3,219	46.0	
Australia	Ian Kelly	347	4.9	
Total formal votes		7,006	93.5	
Informal votes		487	6.5	
Turnout		7,493	82.3	
Two-party-preferred result
Liberal	Brian Sodeman	3,594	51.3	
Labor	Arthur Bickerton	3,412	48.7	
Liberal gain from Labor		Swing		

=== Rockingham ===
1974 Western Australian state election: Rockingham
Party	Candidate	Votes	%	±%
Labor	Mike Barnett	3,573	46.8	
Liberal	Reginald Ritchie	3,146	41.2	
National Alliance	Ronald Harman	629	8.2	
Independent	Eric Edwards	289	3.8	
Total formal votes		7,637	95.7	
Informal votes		340	4.3	
Turnout		7,977	90.3	
Two-party-preferred result
Labor	Mike Barnett	3,887	50.9	
Liberal	Reginald Ritchie	3,750	49.1	
Labor hold		Swing		

=== Roe ===
1974 Western Australian state election: Roe
Party	Candidate	Votes	%	±%
National Alliance	Bill Young	3,047	43.3	
Liberal	Geoff Grewar	2,394	34.1	
Labor	John Byrne	1,588	22.6	
Total formal votes		7,029	97.2	
Informal votes		205	2.8	
Turnout		7,234	90.9	
Two-candidate-preferred result
Liberal	Geoff Grewar	3,638	51.8	
National Alliance	Bill Young	3,391	48.2	
Liberal gain from National Alliance		Swing		

=== Scarborough ===
1974 Western Australian state election: Scarborough
Party	Candidate	Votes	%	±%
Labor	Des Moore	6,629	46.9	
Liberal	Ray Young	6,442	45.6	
National Alliance	Adrian Briffa	1,070	7.6	
Total formal votes		14,141	96.8	
Informal votes		474	3.2	
Turnout		14,615	90.0	
Two-party-preferred result
Liberal	Ray Young	7,138	50.5	
Labor	Des Moore	7,003	49.5	
Liberal gain from Labor		Swing		

=== South Perth ===
1974 Western Australian state election: South Perth
Party	Candidate	Votes	%	±%
Liberal	Bill Grayden	6,720	50.8	
Labor	Garry Kelly	5,295	40.0	
National Alliance	Bill Wallace	1,215	9.2	
Total formal votes		13,230	97.5	
Informal votes		341	2.5	
Turnout		13,571	87.6	
Two-party-preferred result
Liberal	Bill Grayden	7,753	58.6	
Labor	Garry Kelly	5,477	41.4	
Liberal hold		Swing		

=== Stirling ===
1974 Western Australian state election: Stirling
Party	Candidate	Votes	%	±%
National Alliance	Matt Stephens	3,775	54.4	
Liberal	Glen Mitchell	1,930	27.8	
Labor	Eric Bromilow	1,238	17.8	
Total formal votes		6,943	97.7	
Informal votes		161	2.3	
Turnout		7,104	91.5	
Two-party-preferred result
National Alliance	Matt Stephens	4,889	70.4	
Labor	Eric Bromilow	2,054	29.6	
National Alliance hold		Swing		

- Preferences were not distributed between the National Alliance and Liberal candidates for Stirling.

=== Subiaco ===
1974 Western Australian state election: Subiaco
Party	Candidate	Votes	%	±%
Liberal	Tom Dadour	6,339	49.9	
Labor	Phillip Hall	5,241	41.3	
National Alliance	Francis Dwyer	752	5.9	
Australia	Ronald Hislop	373	2.9	
Total formal votes		12,705	95.7	
Informal votes		567	4.3	
Turnout		13,272	87.4	
Two-party-preferred result
Liberal	Tom Dadour	7,169	56.4	
Labor	Phillip Hall	5,536	43.6	
Liberal hold		Swing		

=== Swan ===
1974 Western Australian state election: Swan
Party	Candidate	Votes	%	±%
Labor	Jack Skidmore	9,021	63.0	
Liberal	Douglas Ismail	4,244	29.6	
National Alliance	Pietro Bendotti	1,052	7.4	
Total formal votes		14,317	93.9	
Informal votes		926	6.1	
Turnout		15,243	89.6	
Two-party-preferred result
Labor	Jack Skidmore	9,179	64.1	
Liberal	Douglas Ismail	5,138	35.9	
Labor hold		Swing		

=== Toodyay ===
1974 Western Australian state election: Toodyay
Party	Candidate	Votes	%	±%
Labor	Clifford Hunt	6,101	42.8	
Liberal	Mick Nanovich	5,630	39.5	
National Alliance	Albert Tonkin	2,369	16.6	
Australia	George Gaunt	144	1.0	
Total formal votes		14,244	95.6	
Informal votes		660	4.4	
Turnout		14,904	93.2	
Two-party-preferred result
Liberal	Mick Nanovich	7,420	52.1	
Labor	Clifford Hunt	6,824	47.9	
Liberal gain from Labor		Swing		

=== Vasse ===
1974 Western Australian state election: Vasse
Party	Candidate	Votes	%	±%
Liberal	Barry Blaikie	4,548	60.0	
Labor	Robert Goddard	2,015	26.6	
National Alliance	Ronald Loughton	1,014	13.4	
Total formal votes		7,577	96.7	
Informal votes		256	3.3	
Turnout		7,833	93.8	
Two-party-preferred result
Liberal	Barry Blaikie	5,410	71.4	
Labor	Robert Goddard	2,167	28.6	
Liberal hold		Swing		

=== Victoria Park ===
1974 Western Australian state election: Victoria Park
Party	Candidate	Votes	%	±%
Labor	Ron Davies	8,869	63.3	
Liberal	Frank Marciano	4,171	29.8	
National Alliance	Paul Daly	962	6.9	
Total formal votes		14,002	95.9	
Informal votes		598	4.1	
Turnout		14,600	87.7	
Two-party-preferred result
Labor	Ron Davies	9,013	64.4	
Liberal	Frank Marciano	4,989	35.6	
Labor hold		Swing		

=== Warren ===
1974 Western Australian state election: Warren
Party	Candidate	Votes	%	±%
Labor	David Evans	3,453	52.1	
Liberal	Maurice Thompson	2,089	31.5	
National Alliance	John Dempster	1,092	16.5	
Total formal votes		6,634	96.6	
Informal votes		233	3.4	
Turnout		6,867	92.8	
Two-party-preferred result
Labor	David Evans	3,617	54.5	
Liberal	Maurice Thompson	3,017	45.5	
Labor hold		Swing		

=== Wellington ===
1974 Western Australian state election: Wellington
Party	Candidate	Votes	%	±%
Labor	Andrew Thomson	3,036	41.1	
Liberal	June Craig	2,978	40.4	
National Alliance	John Chidlow	1,365	18.5	
Total formal votes		7,379	95.1	
Informal votes		378	4.9	
Turnout		7,757	92.1	
Two-party-preferred result
Liberal	June Craig	4,139	56.1	
Labor	Andrew Thomson	3,240	43.9	
Liberal hold		Swing		

=== Welshpool ===
1974 Western Australian state election: Welshpool
Party	Candidate	Votes	%	±%
Labor	Colin Jamieson	8,807	61.5	
Liberal	George Fisher	4,492	31.4	
National Alliance	Laurence Eaton	1,026	7.2	
Total formal votes		14,325	94.9	
Informal votes		763	5.1	
Turnout		15,088	88.6	
Two-party-preferred result
Labor	Colin Jamieson	8,961	62.6	
Liberal	George Fisher	5,364	37.4	
Labor hold		Swing		

== See also ==
- 1974 Western Australian state election
- Members of the Western Australian Legislative Assembly, 1974–1977
- Candidates of the 1974 Western Australian state election
