= Court–McPharlin ministry =

The Court–McPharlin Ministry was the 26th Ministry of the Government of Western Australia, and was led by Liberal Premier Sir Charles Court and his deputy, National Country Party leader Ray McPharlin. It succeeded the Tonkin ministry on 8 April 1974, following the defeat of the Labor government at the 1974 election nine days earlier. The Ministry collapsed when McPharlin led the National Country Party out of the Coalition on 20 May 1975, and was reconstituted on 5 June 1975 as the Court Ministry.

== Overview ==
Prior to the election, the Country Party had tentatively merged with the Democratic Labor Party, going to the voters as the "National Alliance" which put forward a centrist platform—however, they lost both votes and seats in doing so, when compared with the two parties' performance at the 1971 election.

In order to form a parliamentary majority, the National Country Party under its new leader, Ray McPharlin, agreed to form a coalition with the Liberals after the election, and negotiated three seats in the Ministry. However, relations between the two parties were not smooth—the reduced position of the party vis-a-vis the Liberals had led to public discussions that it needed an identity distinct from the Liberals in order to survive.

Ultimately, tensions over rural and education issues and, ultimately, milk quotas for dairy producers led to a split, and on 20 May 1975, National Country Party leader Ray McPharlin had led the party (and its three Ministers) out of the Coalition. In the negotiations which followed, which included, among others, Federal Country Party leader Doug Anthony and Queensland Premier Joh Bjelke-Petersen, McPharlin was replaced as leader by Dick Old and the Coalition was resumed on 31 May; however, Court insisted he was too inexperienced to be Deputy Premier, and from this point until the Liberals' defeat in 1983, while the Coalition was maintained between the two parties, the Liberal Party got to name both leading positions in the Ministry.

== The Ministry ==
On 8 April 1974, the Governor, Air Commodore Sir Hughie Edwards, constituted the Ministry. He designated 12 principal executive offices of the Government and appointed the following ministers to their positions, who served until the end of the Ministry on 5 June 1975.

On 20 May 1975, the three Country members of the Ministry resigned. Four existing Ministers assumed the portfolios in an acting capacity while negotiations continued: Des O'Neil and Alan Ridge divided Ray McPharlin's duties, whilst Neil McNeill acted for Matt Stephens and Graham MacKinnon acted for Norm Baxter.

The list below is ordered by decreasing seniority within the Cabinet, as indicated by the Government Gazette and the Hansard index. Blue entries indicate members of the Liberal Party, whilst green entries indicate members of the National Country Party. The members of the Ministry were:

| Office | Minister |
|---|---|
| Premier and Treasurer; Minister Co-ordinating Economic and Social Development | Sir Charles Court, OBE, Dip.Acctg., FCA, FICS, FASA, MLA |
| Deputy Premier; Minister for Agriculture | Ray McPharlin, MLA (until 20 May 1975) |
| Minister for Works; Minister for Water Supplies; Minister for Housing; Deputy Premier (Acting, from 20 May 1975) | Des O'Neil, DipEd, MLA |
| Minister for Justice; Leader of the Government in the Legislative Council (Acting, from 20 May 1975:) Chief Secretary Minister for Conservation and Environment Minister for Fisheries and Wildlife | Neil McNeill, BSc (Agric), MLC |
| Minister for Transport; Minister for Police; Minister for Traffic; Minister for Traffic Safety (from 1 May 1974) | Ray O'Connor, MLA |
| Minister for Education; Minister for Cultural Affairs; Minister for Recreation (Acting, from 20 May 1975:) Minister for Health Minister for Community Welfare | Graham MacKinnon, ED, JP, MLC |
| Chief Secretary; Minister for Conservation and Environment; Minister for Fisheries and Fauna | Matt Stephens, DipEd, MLA (until 20 May 1975) |
| Minister for Labour and Industry; Minister for Consumer Affairs; Minister for Immigration; Minister for Tourism | Bill Grayden, MLA |
| Minister for Industrial Development; Minister for Mines; Minister for Electricity (from 1 May 1974); Minister for Fuel and Energy | Andrew Mensaros, MLA |
| Minister for Local Government; Minister for Urban Development and Town Planning | Cyril Rushton, MLA |
| Minister for Lands; Minister for Forests; Minister for the North-West; Minister for Agriculture (Acting, from 20 May 1975) | Alan Ridge, MLA |
| Minister for Health; Minister for Community Welfare | Norm Baxter, MLC (until 20 May 1975) |

| Preceded by Tonkin Ministry | Court–McPharlin Ministry; 1974-1975 | Succeeded by Court Ministry |
