= Members of the Western Australian Legislative Assembly, 1974–1977 =

This is a list of members of the Western Australian Legislative Assembly from 1974 to 1977. All members denoted "National Country" were elected under the National Alliance banner, but shortly thereafter adopted the name "National Country Party".

Name	Party	District	Years in office
Mike Barnett	Labor	Rockingham	1974–1996
Tom Bateman	Labor	Canning	1968–1986
Ron Bertram	Labor	Mount Hawthorn	1968–1989
Barry Blaikie	Liberal	Vasse	1971–1996
Sir David Brand^{[1]}	Liberal	Greenough	1945–1975
Mal Bryce	Labor	Ascot	1971–1988
Brian Burke	Labor	Balga	1973–1988
Terry Burke	Labor	Perth	1968–1987
Jeff Carr	Labor	Geraldton	1974–1991
Jim Clarko	Liberal	Karrinyup	1974–1996
Sir Charles Court	Liberal	Nedlands	1953–1982
Hendy Cowan	National Country	Merredin-Yilgarn	1974–2001
Peter Coyne	Liberal	Murchison-Eyre	1971–1986
June Craig	Liberal	Wellington	1974–1983
Bert Crane	National Country	Moore	1974–1989
Tom Dadour	Liberal	Subiaco	1971–1986
Ron Davies	Labor	Victoria Park	1961–1986
David Evans	Labor	Warren	1968–1989
Tom Evans	Labor	Kalgoorlie	1956–1980
Harry Fletcher	Labor	Fremantle	1959–1977
Bill Grayden	Liberal	South Perth	1947–1949; 1956–1993
Geoff Grewar	Liberal	Roe	1974–1983
John Harman	Labor	Maylands	1968–1986
Tom Hartrey	Labor	Boulder-Dundas	1971–1977
Ross Hutchinson	Liberal	Cottesloe	1950–1977
Colin Jamieson	Labor	Welshpool	1953–1986
Peter Jones	National Country	Narrogin	1974–1986
Tom Jones	Labor	Collie	1968–1989
Ian Laurance	Liberal	Gascoyne	1974–1987
Donald May	Labor	Clontarf	1962–1965; 1968–1977
Ken McIver	Labor	Avon	1968–1986
Ray McPharlin	National Country	Mount Marshall	1967–1983
Andrew Mensaros	Liberal	Floreat	1968–1991
James Moiler	Labor	Mundaring	1971–1977
Mick Nanovich	Liberal	Toodyay	1974–1983
Ray O'Connor	Liberal	Mount Lawley	1959–1984
Dick Old	National Country	Katanning	1974–1986
Des O'Neil	Liberal	East Melville	1959–1980
Alan Ridge	Liberal	Kimberley	1968–1980
Cyril Rushton	Liberal	Dale	1965–1988
Richard Shalders	Liberal	Murray	1974–1983
John Sibson	Liberal	Bunbury	1973–1983
Jack Skidmore	Labor	Swan	1974–1982
Brian Sodeman	Liberal	Pilbara	1974–1983
Matt Stephens	National Country	Stirling	1971–1989
Alexander Taylor	Labor	Cockburn	1968–1984
Ian Thompson	Liberal	Kalamunda	1971–1993
Arthur Tonkin	Labor	Morley	1971–1987
John Tonkin	Labor	Melville	1933–1977
Reg Tubby^{[1]}	Liberal	Greenough	1975–1989
Leo Watt	Liberal	Albany	1974–1993
Ray Young	Liberal	Scarborough	1971–1983

== Notes ==
^{1} On 21 August 1975, the Liberal member for Greenough, former premier Sir David Brand, resigned. Liberal candidate Reg Tubby won the resulting by-election on 1 November 1975.

== Sources ==
- "Former Members" (PDF). Parliament of Western Australia. 2011. Archived from the original (PDF) on 7 August 2011.
