= Minister for Tourism (Western Australia) =

The Minister for Tourism is a position in the Cabinet of Western Australia, first created in 1959 during the Brand–Watts Ministry under the title Minister for Tourists. The current title was adopted in 1971.

The current Minister for Tourism is Rita Saffioti of the Labor Party. The minister, who has generally held other portfolios in addition to tourism, is responsible for Tourism Western Australia (previously the Western Australian Tourism Commission), the state government agency responsible for promoting Western Australia as a holiday destination and as an events venue.

== List of ministers for tourism ==
Twenty four people have been appointed as Minister for Tourism or equivalent. The inaugural minister, Sir David Brand, was also the longest-serving minister, serving for 11 years and 335 days. He was also premier during his time as tourism minister, which has since also occurred with Brian Burke, Richard Court, and Colin Barnett. Barnett was briefly minister during the Court–Cowan government, from 1993 to 1994, and then served twice as minister during his own government (briefly in 2013 and then from 2016), a gap of almost 20 years. Pam Beggs and Kim Hames also served non-consecutive terms as minister.

In the table below, members of the Legislative Council are designated "MLC". All others were members of the Legislative Assembly at the time of their service. In Western Australia, serving ministers are entitled to be styled "The Honourable", and may retain the style after three years' service in the ministry.

Order	Minister	Party	Premier	Title	Term start	Term end	Term in office
1	Sir David Brand	Liberal	Brand	Minister for Tourists	2 April 1959	3 March 1971	11 years, 335 days
2	Tom Evans	Labor	Tonkin	Minister for Tourists	3 March 1971	12 October 1971	223 days
3	Don Taylor	Labor	Tonkin	Minister for Tourism	12 October 1971	30 May 1973	1 year, 230 days
4	Ronald Thompson MLC	Labor	Tonkin	Minister for Tourism	30 May 1973	8 April 1974	313 days
5	Bill Grayden	Liberal	C. Court	Minister for Tourism	8 April 1974	5 June 1975	1 year, 58 days
6	Alan Ridge	Liberal	C. Court	Minister for Tourism	5 June 1975	10 March 1977	1 year, 278 days
7	Graham MacKinnon MLC	Liberal	C. Court	Minister for Tourism	10 March 1977	5 March 1980	2 years, 361 days
8	Ray O'Connor	Liberal	C. Court	Minister for Tourism	5 March 1980	12 February 1981	344 days
9	Peter Jones	Liberal	C. Court	Minister for Tourism	12 February 1981	25 January 1982	347 days
10	Barry MacKinnon	Liberal	O'Connor	Minister for Tourism	25 January 1982	25 February 1983	1 year, 31 days
11	Brian Burke	Labor	Burke	Minister for Tourism	25 February 1983	20 December 1984	1 year, 299 days
12	Des Dans MLC	Labor	Burke	Minister for Tourism	20 December 1984	26 February 1986	1 year, 68 days
11	Pam Beggs	Labor	Burke	Minister for Tourism	26 February 1986	25 February 1988	see below
11	Pam Beggs	Labor	Dowding	Minister for Tourism	25 February 1988	28 February 1989	see below
12	Julian Grill	Labor	Dowding	Minister for Tourism	28 February 1989	12 February 1990	349 days
(11)	Pam Beggs	Labor	Lawrence	Minister for Tourism	12 February 1990	16 February 1993	6 years, 6 days
13	Doug Shave	Liberal	R. Court	Minister for Tourism	16 February 1993	24 August 1993	189 days
14	Colin Barnett	Liberal	R. Court	Minister for Tourism	25 August 1993	25 January 1994	see below
15	Richard Court	Liberal	R. Court	Minister for Tourism	25 January 1994	21 December 1995	1 year, 330 days
16	Norman Moore MLC	Liberal	R. Court	Minister for Tourism	21 December 1995	16 February 2001	5 years, 57 days
17	Clive Brown	Labor	Gallop	Minister for Tourism	6 March 2001	27 June 2003	2 years, 113 days
18	Bob Kucera	Labor	Gallop	Minister for Tourism	27 June 2003	10 March 2005	1 year, 256 days
19	Mark McGowan	Labor	Gallop	Minister for Tourism	10 March 2005	25 January 2006	330 days
19	Mark McGowan	Labor	Carpenter	Minister for Tourism	25 January 2006	3 February 2006	330 days
20	Sheila McHale	Labor	Carpenter	Minister for Tourism	3 February 2006	23 September 2008	2 years, 233 days
21	Liz Constable	Independent	Barnett	Minister for Tourism	23 September 2008	14 December 2010	2 years, 82 days
22	Kim Hames	Liberal	Barnett	Minister for Tourism	14 December 2010	22 July 2013	see below
(14)	Colin Barnett	Liberal	Barnett	Minister for Tourism	22 July 2013	5 August 2013	167 days
23	Liza Harvey	Liberal	Barnett	Minister for Tourism	5 August 2013	8 December 2014	1 year, 125 days
(22)	Kim Hames	Liberal	Barnett	Minister for Tourism	8 December 2014	31 March 2016	1 year, 114 days
(14)	Colin Barnett	Liberal	Barnett	Minister for Tourism	31 March 2016	17 March 2017	351 days
24	Paul Papalia	Labor	McGowan	Minister for Tourism	17 March 2017	19 March 2021	4 years, 2 days
25	David Templeman	Labor	McGowan	Minister for Tourism	19 March 2021	21 December 2021	277 days
26	Roger Cook	Labor	McGowan	Minister for Tourism	21 December 2021	8 June 2023	1 year, 164 days
27	Rita Saffioti	Labor	Cook	Minister for Tourism	8 June 2023	incumbent	3 years, 63 days

== List of assistant ministers for tourism ==
Ian Laurance was assistant minister to Ray O'Connor and Peter Jones during the last years of the Court government, led by Sir Charles Court. O'Connor and Jones both held multiple other portfolios.

Order	Minister	Party	Premier	Title	Term start	Term end	Term in office
1	Ian Laurance	Liberal	C. Court	Honorary Minister assisting the Minister for Tourism	5 March 1980	25 January 1982	1 year, 326 days

== See also ==
- Minister for Citizenship and Multicultural Interests (previously the Minister for Immigration)
- Minister for Tourism (Australia)
  - Minister for Tourism (Victoria)
  - Minister for Tourism, Major Events, Hospitality and Racing (New South Wales)
