= Norm Baxter =

Australian politician

The Honourable Norm Baxter

Member of the Legislative Council of Western Australia
- In office 6 May 1950 – 21 May 1958
- Preceded by: None (new seat)
- Succeeded by: Charles Abbey
- Constituency: Central Province
- In office 22 May 1960 – 21 May 1983
- Preceded by: Sir Charles Latham
- Succeeded by: Gordon Atkinson
- Constituency: Central Province

Personal details
- Born: 21 June 1909 West Perth, Western Australia
- Died: 14 November 2003 (aged 94) Perth, Western Australia
- Party: Country / National Country

Norman Eric Baxter (21 June 1909 – 14 November 2003) was an Australian politician who was a member of the Legislative Council of Western Australia from 1950 to 1958 and again from 1960 to 1983. He was a minister in the government of Sir Charles Court.

== Early life ==
Baxter was born in Perth to Jessica Minnie (née Milsom) and Charles Farquharson Baxter. His father was also a member of parliament and government minister. Baxter attended the Perth Boys' School and Hale School. From 1929 to 1946, he had a farm at Balingup, which until 1933 he owned in partnership with his brother. After 1946, Baxter worked as an organiser for the Country Party.

== Politics ==
Baxter first ran for parliament at the 1947 state election, as a Country Party candidate, but was defeated in the seat of Northam by Albert Hawke (a future Labor premier). In March 1950, his father, who represented East Province in the Legislative Council, died in office. Baxter stood for the resulting by-election (which was held for Central Province due to a redistribution), and was successful.

Having served out his father's term, Baxter was re-elected at the 1952 Legislative Council election, but in 1958 was defeated by Charles Abbey of the Liberal Party. He re-entered parliament just two years later, following the retirement of Sir Charles Latham, a former Country Party leader. Baxter would be re-elected on another three occasions, at the 1965, 1971, and 1977 state elections. After the Liberal–NCP coalition won power at the 1974 election, he was made Minister for Health and Minister for Community Welfare in the new ministry. However, the coalition broke in May 1975, and he and the two other NCP ministers (Ray McPharlin and Matt Stephens) resigned from cabinet. The disputes which had led to the split were quickly resolved, and Baxter re-entered the ministry the following month, where he remained until a reshuffle following the 1977 election.

== Later life ==
Baxter retired from parliament at the 1983 state election. He died in Perth in November 2003, aged 94. He had married twice, firstly in 1934 to Dulcie Armour, with whom he had four children. He divorced her in 1966 and remarried the following year to Joan Ellis (née Hughes), although he was widowed in 1998.

Parliament of Western Australia
Political offices
| Preceded by Ron Davies; Graham MacKinnon | Minister for Health; 1974–1975; 1975–1977 | Succeeded by Graham MacKinnon; Alan Ridge |
| Preceded by Ron Thompson; Graham MacKinnon | Minister for Community Welfare; 1974–1975; 1975–1977 | Succeeded by Graham MacKinnon; Alan Ridge |
