= Peter Jones (Australian politician) =

Australian politician

The Honourable Peter Jones AM

Deputy Leader of the National Country Party (WA)
- In office 18 May 1975 – 30 January 1985
- Leader: Dick Old
- Preceded by: Matt Stephens
- Succeeded by: Matt Stephens

Member of the Legislative Assembly of Western Australia
- In office 30 March 1974 – 8 February 1986
- Preceded by: William Manning
- Succeeded by: Cambell Nalder
- Constituency: Narrogin

Personal details
- Born: 28 January 1933 Launceston, Tasmania, Australia
- Died: 16 January 2017 (aged 83) Perth, Western Australia
- Party: National Country (Note: The party was known as the National Alliance at the 1974 state election, a consequence of the merger of the former Country Party with the Democratic Labor Party.) (to 1985); Liberal (from 1985)

Peter Vernon Jones AM (28 January 1933 – 16 January 2017) was an Australian politician who served as a member of the Western Australian Legislative Assembly from 1974 to 1986, representing the seat of Narrogin. He was a minister in the governments of Charles Court and Ray O'Connor.

== Early life ==
Jones was born in Launceston, Tasmania, the son of Annie May (née Simmons) and Harold Vernon Jones. He attended Launceston Church Grammar School, where his father was the headmaster. After leaving school, Jones farmed at Hagley. He moved to Western Australia in 1968 and subsequently farmed at Narrogin, on a property of 2,700 hectares (6,700 acres). From 1972 to 1974, Jones was a member of the state marketing board for barley. He married Margaret Antonia Maslin in 1960, with whom he had three children.

== Politics ==
A member of the National Country Party (NCP), Jones entered parliament at the 1974 state election, replacing the retiring William Manning. In May 1975, a split in the party saw Ray McPharlin replaced as leader by Dick Old, with Jones replacing Matt Stephens as deputy leader. He was subsequently appointed to the ministry, becoming Minister for Housing, Minister for Conservation and the Environment and Minister for Fisheries and Wildlife.

In a reshuffle after the 1977 state election, Jones was instead made Minister for Education, Minister for Cultural Affairs, and Minister for Recreation. A further reshuffle occurred after the 1980 election, and he became Minister for Resources Development, Minister for Mines, Minister for Fuel and Energy and Minister for Industrial Development and Commerce. In February 1981, Jones added another three portfolios, becoming Minister for Housing (for a second time), Minister for Regional Administration and the North-West, and Minister for Tourism. However, when Ray O'Connor replaced Charles Court as premier in January 1982, his workload was reduced to just three portfolios again – resources development, mines, and fuel and energy. Jones exited the ministry when the Liberal–NCP government was defeated at the 1983 state election.

In 1978, several National Country MPs had left the party to form a new group, the National Party. The NCP and the National Party merged in October 1984, under the name of the latter, although the parliamentary NCP was not formally dissolved until January 1985. Its three remaining members in the Legislative Assembly – Jones, Bert Crane, and Dick Old – refused to join the new unified party, instead joining the Liberal Party. At the 1986 state election, Jones and Old were defeated by National Party, although Crane retained his seat as a Liberal.

== Later life ==
After leaving parliament, Jones initially worked as a company executive, and also occupied several administrative positions in the Liberal Party, serving as state president from April 1989 to July 1991 and as a federal vice-president from July 1990 to October 1996. From 1995 to 2002, Jones chaired the Water Corporation, a WA state government agency. He then chaired Defence Housing Australia from 2003 to 2008. Jones died in Perth in January 2017, aged 83.

== Notes ==
Parliament of Western Australia
Preceded by William Manning	Member for Narrogin; 1974–1986	Succeeded by Cambell Nalder
Political offices
Preceded by Des O'Neil; Ray O'Connor	Minister for Housing; 1975–1977; 1981–1982	Succeeded by Andrew Mensaros; Ray Young
Preceded by Matt Stephens	Minister for Conservation and the Environment; 1975–1977	Succeeded by Graham MacKinnon
Preceded by Matt Stephens	Minister for Fisheries and Wildlife; 1975–1977	Succeeded by Graham MacKinnon
Preceded by Graham MacKinnon	Minister for Education; 1977–1980	Succeeded by Bill Grayden
Preceded by Graham MacKinnon	Minister for Cultural Affairs; 1977–1980	Succeeded by Bill Grayden
Preceded by Graham MacKinnon	Minister for Recreation; 1977–1980	Succeeded by Bill Grayden
Preceded by Andrew Mensaros	Minister for Resources Development; 1980–1983	Succeeded by Mal Bryce
Preceded by Andrew Mensaros	Minister for Mines; 1980–1983	Succeeded by Peter Dowding
Preceded by Andrew Mensaros	Minister for Fuel and Energy; 1980–1983	Succeeded by Peter Dowding
Preceded by Andrew Mensaros	Minister for Industrial Development and Commerce; 1980–1982	Succeeded by Barry MacKinnon
Preceded by Ray O'Connor	Minister for Regional Administration and the North-West; 1981–1982	Succeeded by Barry MacKinnon
Preceded by Ray O'Connor	Minister for Tourism; 1981–1982	Succeeded by Barry MacKinnon
