= Ian Medcalf =

Australian politician

The Honourable Ian Medcalf AO ED QC

Attorney-General of Western Australia
- In office 22 December 1975 – 25 February 1983
- Preceded by: Neil McNeill
- Succeeded by: Joe Berinson

Member of the Legislative Council of Western Australia
- In office 22 May 1968 – 21 May 1986 Serving with James Hislop (1968–1971); John Williams (1971–1986)
- Preceded by: Keith Watson
- Succeeded by: Max Evans
- Constituency: Metropolitan Province

Personal details
- Born: 12 July 1918 Claremont, Western Australia
- Died: 1 May 2011 (aged 92) Claremont, Western Australia
- Party: Liberal
- Education: University of Western Australia

Ian George Medcalf AO ED QC (12 July 1918 – 1 May 2011) was an Australian politician who was a Liberal Party member of the Legislative Council of Western Australia from 1968 to 1986. He served as Attorney-General of Western Australia from 1975 to 1983, in the governments of Sir Charles Court and Ray O'Connor.

== Early life ==
Medcalf was born in Perth, but spent his early childhood in Albany, where he attended Albany High School. He returned to Perth to attend Scotch College, and then went on to the University of Western Australia, where he graduated with a law degree in 1941. Medcalf enlisted in the Australian Imperial Force in July 1942, and during the war served as an officer with the 16th Battalion. He continued with the Citizen Military Forces (now the Australian Army Reserve) after the war's end, and eventually reached the rank of lieutenant-colonel. Outside of his involvement with the military, Medcalf worked as a solicitor, and in 1951 was made a partner in his law firm. Between 1949 and 1952, he also lectured in property law at his alma mater.

== Politics ==
A member of the Liberal Party since 1960, Medcalf was elected to parliament at the 1968 state election, winning a seat in the Legislative Council. He was elevated to the Court ministry in June 1975, but initially served only as an honorary minister (without a specific portfolio). His promotion to a substantive ministerial title came in December of the same year, when he was made Attorney-General and Minister for Federal Affairs. Medcalf held those positions throughout the remainder of Charles Court's term as premier, and in March 1980 was also made Leader of the Government in the Legislative Council, replacing Neil McNeill.

Medcalf remained in the ministry when Ray O'Connor succeeded Court as premier in January 1982 (retaining his previous positions), and in December 1982 was also made Minister for Police, replacing Bill Hassell. After the defeat of the Liberal government at the 1983 state election, he continued on in O'Connor's shadow ministry. Medcalf resigned from the frontbench a few months after Bill Hassell's election as Liberal leader in February 1984, and left parliament entirely at the 1986 election.

== Later life ==
From 1987 to 1993, Medcalf served as president of the WA branch of the National Trust. He was made an Officer of the Order of Australia (AO) in 1992, "for service to the law, to the Western Australian Parliament, and to the community". Medcalf died in Perth in May 2011, aged 92. He had married Winifred Maxine Love in 1944, with whom he had three children.

Parliament of Western Australia
Political offices
| Preceded by Neil McNeill | Attorney-General; 1975–1983 | Succeeded by Joe Berinson |
| Preceded by Sir Charles Court | Minister for Federal Affairs; 1975–1983 | Title abolished |
| Preceded by Bill Hassell | Minister for Police; 1982–1983 | Succeeded by Jeff Carr |
