= 1986 Western Australian state election =

- 8 February 1986

All 57 seats in the Western Australian Legislative Assembly and 17 (of the 34) seats to the Western Australian Legislative Council 29 Assembly seats were needed for a majority
	First party	Second party	Third party
	ALP	LIB	NAT
Leader	Brian Burke	Bill Hassell	Hendy Cowan
Party	Labor	Liberal	National
Leader since	18 September 1981	15 February 1984	August 1978
Leader's seat	Balga	Cottesloe	Merredin
Last election	32 seats	20 seats	5 seats
Seats won	32	19	6
Seat change	Steady	▼1	▲1
Popular vote	416,805	324,961	29,156
Percentage	53.00%	41.32%	3.71%
Swing	▼0.16	▲1.46	▼1.40
TPP	54.12%	45.88%
TPP swing	▲0.37	▼0.37
Premier before election
Brian Burke
Labor
Elected Premier
Brian Burke
Labor

Elections were held in the state of Western Australia on 8 February 1986 to elect all 57 members to the Legislative Assembly and 17 members to the 34-seat Legislative Council. The Labor government, led by Premier Brian Burke, won a second term in office against the Liberal Party, led by Opposition Leader Bill Hassell since 16 February 1984.

The election resulted in one of Labor's best state election results after World War II, and featured a united National Party for the first time since the 1977 election.

== Results ==
=== Legislative Assembly ===
Western Australian state election, 8 February 1986 Legislative Assembly << 1983–1989 >>
Enrolled voters	883,239				
Votes cast	807,634		Turnout	91.44%	+3.51%
Informal votes	21,240		Informal	2.63%	–0.20%
Summary of votes by party
Party	Primary votes	%	Swing	Seats	Change
Labor	416,805	53.00%	–0.16%	32	± 0
Liberal	324,961	41.32%	+1.46%	19	– 1
National^{[1]}	29,156	3.71%	–1.40%	6	+ 1
Democrats	5,192	0.66%	–0.14%	0	± 0
Other parties	2,630	0.33%	–0.73%	0	± 0
Independent	7,650	0.98%	+0.48%	0	± 0
Total	786,394			57	
Two-party-preferred
Labor	427,704	54.12%	+0.37%		
Liberal	362,642	45.88%	–0.37%		

Notes:

^{1} The National Country Party (NCP) and the National Party (NP), which had been two separate parties from 1978 onwards, united in 1985 to form the National Party. Three sitting members who had previously identified as National Country Party stood for the Liberal Party in 1986, with two losing their seats to the Nationals, and the other (Bert Crane in Moore) retaining his seat. The Nationals also gained Avon from the Labor Party, and Mount Marshall from the Liberals, who had held it for a single term.

=== Legislative Council ===
Western Australian state election, 8 February 1986 Legislative Council
Enrolled voters	883,239				
Votes cast	807,496		Turnout	91.42%	+2.44%
Informal votes	26,530		Informal	3.29%	–0.43%
Summary of votes by party
Party	Primary votes	%	Swing	Seats won	Seats held
Labor	352,437	45.13%	–5.50%	9	15
Liberal	327,786	41.97%	+0.40%	6	15
National	37,194	4.76%	–1.59%	2	4
Democrats	63,483	8.13%	+6.68%	0	0
Independent	66	0.01%	+0.01%	0	0
Total	780,966			17	34
Two-party-preferred
Labor	418,124	53.54%	+0.57%		
Liberal	361,160	46.25%	–0.57%		

== Seats changing parties ==
Seat	Pre-1986			Swing	Post-1986		
Seat	Party	Member	Margin	Swing	Margin	Member	Party
Avon	Labor	Ken McIver	8.4*	N/A	1.8**	Max Trenorden	National
Mount Marshall	Liberal	Bill McNee	5.7***	N/A	3.3	Mort Schell	National
Subiaco	Independent	Tom Dadour	1.6**	3.3	1.7*	Carmen Lawrence	Labor

- Members listed in italics did not contest their seat at this election.
- * figure is vs. Liberal
- ** figure is vs. Labor
- *** figure is vs. National (pre-merger)

== Post-election pendulum ==
Labor seats (32)
Marginal
Geraldton	Jeff Carr	ALP	0.4%
Subiaco	Carmen Lawrence	ALP	1.7%
Warren	David Evans	ALP	2.9%
Collie	Tom Jones	ALP	4.2%
Mundaring	Gavan Troy	ALP	5.3%
Bunbury	Phil Smith	ALP	5.4%
Fairly safe
Esperance-Dundas	Judyth Watson	ALP	7.1%
Mandurah	John Read	ALP	9.4%
Joondalup	Jackie Watkins	ALP	9.5%
Whitford	Pam Beggs	ALP	9.8%
Nollamara	Keith Wilson	ALP	9.9%
Safe
Mitchell	David Smith	ALP	10.0%
Scarborough	Graham Burkett	ALP	10.3%
Welshpool	Bill Thomas	ALP	13.2%
Balcatta	Ron Bertram	ALP	13.4%
Helena	Gordon Hill	ALP	14.5%
Rockingham	Mike Barnett	ALP	14.6%
Pilbara	Pam Buchanan	ALP	14.7%
Gosnells	Yvonne Henderson	ALP	14.8%
Perth	Terry Burke	ALP	14.9%
Victoria Park	Ron Davies	ALP	14.9%
Armadale	Bob Pearce	ALP	15.7%
Canning	Tom Bateman	ALP	15.8%
Kimberley	Ernie Bridge	ALP	16.5%
Morley-Swan	Arthur Tonkin	ALP	16.9%
Maylands	Peter Dowding	ALP	17.1%
Ascot	Mal Bryce	ALP	18.2%
Melville	Barry Hodge	ALP	19.5%
Fremantle	David Parker	ALP	21.8%
Cockburn	Clive Hughes	ALP	24.7%
Balga	Brian Burke	ALP	29.6%
Kalgoorlie	Ian Taylor	ALP	30.1% v IND

Liberal/National seats (25)
Marginal
Dale	Cyril Rushton	LIB	1.6%
Murchison-Eyre	Ross Lightfoot	LIB	1.6%
Avon	Max Trenorden	NAT	1.8%
Mount Lawley	George Cash	LIB	2.1%
Murdoch	Barry MacKinnon	LIB	2.3%
Albany	Leon Watt	LIB	3.3%
Mount Marshall	Mort Schell	NAT	3.3% v LIB
Fairly safe
Darling Range	George Spriggs	LIB	6.2%
Karrinyup	Jim Clarko	LIB	6.3%
South Perth	Bill Grayden	LIB	6.5%
Clontarf	Tony Williams	LIB	8.1%
Cottesloe	Bill Hassell	LIB	8.2%
Kalamunda	Ian Thompson	LIB	8.9%
Narrogin	Cambell Nalder	NAT	9.1% v LIB
Murray-Wellington	John Bradshaw	LIB	9.8%
Safe
East Melville	Richard Lewis	LIB	10.0%
Gascoyne	Ian Laurance	LIB	10.5%
Katanning-Roe	Monty House	NAT	11.2% v LIB
Stirling	Matt Stephens	NAT	12.2% v LIB
Vasse	Barry Blaikie	LIB	13.5%
Floreat	Andrew Mensaros	LIB	14.6%
Nedlands	Richard Court	LIB	14.9%
Greenough	Reg Tubby	LIB	23.6%
Moore	Bert Crane	LIB	24.5%
Merredin	Hendy Cowan	NAT	29.0%

== Opinion polling ==
Morgan Gallop opinion poll results
Date	Primary vote		Leader's approval rating	
Date	Labor	Liberal-National	Labor	Liberal
19 February 1983 election	53.8	44.2	—N/a	—N/a
March–April 1983	58	37	70	44
May–June 1983	55	41	72	48
July–August 1983	51	43	68	47
September–October 1983	48	47	63	43
November–December 1983	56	40	63	45
January–February 1984	53	42	71	37
15 February 1984	Bill Hassell replaces Ray O'Connor as leader of the Liberal Party			
March–April 1984	49	46	68	38
May–June 1984	54	41	66	38
July–August 1984	50	46	65	40
September–October 1984	57	38	69	39
November–December 1984	53	42	63	41
January–February 1985	45	49	58	39
March–April 1985	45	47	53	36
May–June 1985	45	48	61	37
July–August 1985	48	47	64	34
September–October 1985	49	45	61	32
November–December 1985	53	40	65	32
8 February 1986 election	53.2	44.9	—N/a	—N/a

== See also ==
- Candidates of the 1986 Western Australian state election
- Members of the Western Australian Legislative Assembly, 1983–1986
- Members of the Western Australian Legislative Assembly, 1986–1989
