= Graham MacKinnon =

Australian politician

The Honourable Graham MacKinnon CMG ED

Member of the Legislative Council of Western Australia
- In office 22 May 1956 – 21 May 1965
- Preceded by: Les Craig
- Succeeded by: Vic Ferry
- Constituency: South-West Province
- In office 22 May 1965 – 21 May 1974
- Preceded by: None (new seat)
- Succeeded by: Ian Pratt
- Constituency: Lower West Province
- In office 22 May 1974 – 21 May 1986
- Preceded by: Francis Willmott
- Succeeded by: Doug Wenn
- Constituency: South-West Province

Personal details
- Born: 10 December 1916 Bridgetown, Western Australia, Australia
- Died: 27 June 1992 (aged 75) Nedlands, Western Australia, Australia
- Party: Liberal

Graham Charles MacKinnon CMG ED (10 December 1916 – 27 June 1992) was an Australian politician who was a Liberal Party member of the Legislative Council of Western Australia from 1956 to 1986. He served as a minister in the governments of David Brand and Charles Court.

== Early life ==
MacKinnon was born in Bridgetown, Western Australia, to Rhoda Myrtle (née Moyes) and Charles Archibald MacKinnon. He attended Bunbury Senior High School, and subsequently worked as a clerk and shop assistant. MacKinnon enlisted in the Australian Army in 1940, and during the war served with the 2/4th Machine Gun in Malaya and Singapore, reaching the rank of lieutenant. He was a Japanese prisoner of war for three years after the Fall of Singapore. After the war's end, MacKinnon moved to Bunbury, where he owned a caravan manufacturer and later managed a sewing machine company. He was also president of the local branch of the Returned Services League (RSL).

== Politics ==
At the 1956 Legislative Council elections, MacKinnon was elected to the two-member South-West Province, replacing the retiring Les Craig. He was made deputy chairman of committees in 1958, and served in that position until 1965. At the 1965 state election, MacKinnon transferred to the new Lower West Province. He made an honorary minister after the election, and a few months later was given a substantive position in the ministry, becoming Minister for Health and Minister for Fisheries and Fauna. He was also made Minister for Environmental Protection (a new title) in December 1970, and held those positions until the Brand government's defeat at the 1971 election. MacKinnon returned to the ministry just three years later, appointed Minister for Education, Minister for Cultural Affairs, and Minister for Recreation in the new Court government.

Following a reshuffle after the 1977 election, MacKinnon was made Minister for Conservation and the Environment, Minister for Fisheries and Wildlife, and Minister for Tourism. Another reshuffle occurred in August 1978, and his titles thereafter were Minister for Works, Minister for Water Supplies, and Minister for Tourism, which he held until leaving the ministry at the 1980 election. MacKinnon left parliament at the 1986 election, having returned to his original constituency (South-West Province) in 1974. In the 1980 Birthday Honours, he had been made a Companion of the Order of St Michael and St George (CMG), for "political and public service". MacKinnon died in Perth in June 1992, aged 75. He had married Mary Theresa Shaw in 1940, with whom he had two sons. One of his nephews, Barry MacKinnon, was also a Liberal Party MP, and the two served together in parliament from 1977 to 1986.

== See also ==
- Members of the Western Australian Legislative Council

Political offices
Preceded by Ross Hutchinson	Minister for Health; 1965–1971	Succeeded by Ron Davies
Preceded by Ross Hutchinson; Peter Jones	Minister for Fisheries and Fauna/ Minister for Fisheries and Wildlife; 1965–1971; 1977–1978	Succeeded by Ron Davies; Ray O'Connor
Preceded by None (new title); Peter Jones	Minister for Environmental Protection/ Minister for Conservation and the Environment; 1970–1971; 1977–1978	Succeeded by John Tonkin; Ray O'Connor
Preceded by Jerry Dolan	Minister for Education; 1974–1977	Succeeded by Peter Jones
Preceded by John Tonkin	Minister for Cultural Affairs; 1974–1977	Succeeded by Peter Jones
Preceded by Tom Evans	Minister for Recreation; 1974–1977	Succeeded by Peter Jones
Preceded by Alan Ridge	Minister for Tourism; 1977–1980	Succeeded by Ray O'Connor
Preceded by Ray O'Connor	Minister for Works; 1978–1980	Succeeded by Andrew Mensaros
Preceded by Ray O'Connor	Minister for Water Supplies; 1978–1980	Succeeded by Andrew Mensaros
