= David Evans (Western Australian politician) =

Australian politician (1924–2019)

The Honourable David Evans AM

Member of the Legislative Assembly of Western Australia
- In office 23 March 1968 – 4 February 1989
- Preceded by: Joseph Rowberry
- Succeeded by: Paul Omodei
- Constituency: Warren

Personal details
- Born: Hywel David Evans; 20 December 1924 Penygraig, Rhondda, Wales
- Died: 3 September 2019 (aged 94) Nedlands, Perth, Western Australia
- Party: Labor
- Education: University of Western Australia

Hywel David Evans AM (20 December 1924 – 3 September 2019) was an Australian politician who was a Labor Party member of the Legislative Assembly of Western Australia from 1968 to 1989, representing the seat of Warren. He was a deputy leader of the party on two occasions, and was a minister in the governments of John Tonkin and Brian Burke.

== Early life ==
Evans was born in Penygraig, Glamorgan, Wales, and came to Australia as a child. His family settled in Pemberton, a small town in the South West, and he went on to attend Bunbury High School. Evans enlisted in the Royal Australian Air Force (RAAF) in January 1943, and saw service as a warrant officer in New Guinea and the South-West Pacific. After the war's end, he studied teaching at Claremont Teachers College and the University of Western Australia, and returned to the South West to work.

== Politics and later life ==
A long-time member of the Labor Party, Evans resigned his teaching job to contest the 1968 state election, winning the seat of Warren. After Labor's victory at the 1971 election, he was appointed Minister for Lands, Minister for Agriculture, and Minister for Immigration in the new Tonkin ministry. After a reshuffle in October 1971, he was also made Minister for Forests. With the exception of the immigration portfolio, which was taken over by Don Taylor in February 1973, he retained his titles until Labor's defeat at the 1974 election. He was Shadow Minister for Agriculture in the Tonkin shadow ministry. When Colin Jamieson replaced John Tonkin as Labor leader in 1976, Evans was elected as his deputy. He was replaced as deputy leader by Mal Bryce in 1977, but remained in the shadow ministry.

Evans returned to the deputy leadership in 1980, under new leader Ron Davies, but served only until the following year, when Brian Burke replaced Davies as leader and Mal Bryce became deputy leader again. After Labor's victory at the 1983 state election, Evans was named Minister for Agriculture (for a second time) and Minister for Fisheries and Wildlife. He was the only member of the new ministry to have prior ministerial experience. Evans left the ministry after the 1986 election, and retired from parliament altogether at the 1989 election. He was made a Member of the Order of Australia (AM) in 1993, "in recognition of service to the Western Australian Parliament and to agriculture". Outside of politics, Evans served as a president of the Lower South West Football League, and was involved with various conservation groups. He died in September 2019 at the age of 94.

== See also ==
- 1981 Australian Labor Party (Western Australian Branch) leadership spill
- Dave Evans Bicentennial Tree, named in his honour

Parliament of Western Australia
| Preceded by Joseph Rowberry | Member for Warren; 1968–1989 | Succeeded by Paul Omodei |
Political offices
| Preceded by Stewart Bovell | Minister for Lands; 1971–1974 | Succeeded by Alan Ridge |
| Preceded by Crawford Nalder; Dick Old | Minister for Agriculture; 1971–1974; 1983–1986 | Succeeded by Ray McPharlin; Julian Grill |
| Preceded by Stewart Bovell | Minister for Immigration; 1971–1973 | Succeeded by Don Taylor |
| Preceded by Tom Evans | Minister for Forests; 1971–1974 | Succeeded by Alan Ridge |
| Preceded by Dick Old | Minister for Fisheries and Wildlife; 1983–1986 | Succeeded by Julian Grill |
