= Wyndham Cook =

Australian politician

Member of the Legislative Assembly of Western Australia
- In office 6 June 1970 – 30 March 1974
- Preceded by: Jack Hall
- Succeeded by: Leon Watt
- Constituency: Albany

Personal details
- Born: 20 March 1943 (age 83) Yarloop, Western Australia, Australia
- Party: Labor

Wyndham Truran Cook (born 20 March 1943) is a former Australian politician who was a Labor Party member of the Legislative Assembly of Western Australia from 1970 to 1974, representing the seat of Albany.

Cook was born in Yarloop, a small town in Western Australia's South West region. After leaving school, he worked variously as an engineman (with Western Australian Government Railways), a shop assistant, and a butcher. A trade union official and a member of the Labor Party since 1962, Cook was elected to parliament at the 1970 Albany by-election, which had been caused by the resignation of Jack Hall, the sitting Labor member. Hall had been suffering from ill health and died before the by-election was held. Aged only 27 when elected, Cook retained Albany at the 1971 state election, but was defeated by the Liberal Party's Leon Watt at the 1974 election. After leaving parliament, he operated a tour company in the Mid West. He later lived in Queensland, eventually retiring to Renmark, South Australia.

Parliament of Western Australia
Preceded by Jack Hall	Member for Albany; 1970–1974	Succeeded by Leon Watt
