= Dick Old =

Australian politician

The Honourable Dick Old

Leader of the National Country Party in Western Australia
- In office 18 May 1975 – 30 January 1985
- Deputy: Peter Jones
- Preceded by: Ray McPharlin
- Succeeded by: Hendy Cowan

Member of the Legislative Assembly of Western Australia
- In office 30 March 1974 – 19 February 1983
- Preceded by: Crawford Nalder
- Succeeded by: None (seat abolished)
- Constituency: Katanning
- In office 19 February 1983 – 8 February 1986
- Preceded by: None (new seat)
- Succeeded by: Monty House
- Constituency: Katanning-Roe

Personal details
- Born: 3 December 1922 Katanning, Western Australia
- Died: 29 June 2007 (aged 84) Katanning, Western Australia
- Party: National Country (Note: The party was known as the National Alliance at the 1974 state election, a consequence of the merger of the former Country Party with the Democratic Labor Party.) (to 1985); Liberal (from 1985)

Military service
- Allegiance: Australia
- Branch/service: Royal Australian Air Force
- Years of service: 1941–1945
- Rank: Sergeant
- Battles/wars: Second World War

Richard Charles Old (3 December 1922 – 29 June 2007) was an Australian politician who was a member of the Legislative Assembly of Western Australia from 1974 to 1986. He was state leader of the National Country Party (NCP) from 1975 to 1985, and served as a minister in the governments of Charles Court and Ray O'Connor.

== Early life ==
Old was born in Katanning, Western Australia, to Vera Anne (née Cornish) and James William Old. His uncle, Cyril Cornish, was also a member of parliament. After leaving school, Old began working for Goldsbrough Mort & Co., an agricultural retailer. He enlisted in the Royal Australian Air Force (RAAF) in 1941, and during the war served on airbases in North-West Australia (including Corunna Downs Airfield) as a wireless operator. After being discharged in 1945, Old returned to Goldsbrough Mort as a manager, working for periods in Perth, Midland, Corrigin, and Moora. He managed a machinery company in Mingenew from 1953 to 1956, and then returned to Katanning to take over his father's fuel business. Old was elected to the Katanning Shire Council in 1961, and served as shire president from 1966 to 1973.

== Politics ==
Old entered parliament at the 1974 state election, replacing Sir Crawford Nalder (a former Country Party leader) in the seat of Katanning. After the election, he was elected deputy chairman of committees in the Legislative Assembly. In May 1975, Ray McPharlin, the NCP leader, withdrew the party from its coalition with the Liberal Party over policy differences. McPharlin was subsequently replaced as leader by Old, and the coalition was resumed. Old became Minister for Agriculture in the new ministry, but was not appointed deputy premier (the traditional position for the leader of the minority party in the coalition) due to Charles Court's belief that he was too inexperienced. Despite Old gaining experience as a minister, he still was not appointed Deputy Premier when the position fell vacant in 1980 and 1982 whilst the Coalition had remained in office.

In 1982, when Charles Court was replaced as premier by Ray O'Connor, Old was additionally made Minister for Fisheries and Wildlife. He remained in the ministry until the government's defeat at the 1983 election. Tensions had continued within the NCP after Old's election as leader, and in August 1978 three of its six MPs (Hendy Cowan, Ray McPharlin, and Matt Stephens) left to form their own party, the National Party. The two parties ran candidates against each other in 1980 and 1983, but agreed to merge in 1984, under the name of the National Party. The NCP was not formally wound up until January 1985. Its three remaining members in the Legislative Assembly, Old, Bert Crane, and Peter Jones, refused to join the new unified party, instead switching to the Liberal Party. Old and Jones were defeated by National Party candidates at the 1986 state election, but Crane retained his seat.

== Later life ==
In retirement, Old lived in Perth and Busselton. He continued to campaign for the Liberal Party candidates for some years, but in 1991 resigned his membership to protest the treatment of Liz Constable. Constable had lost a Liberal preselection contest for the 1991 Floreat by-election amid allegations of branch stacking, but subsequently won the seat as an independent. Old died in Busselton in June 2007, aged 84. He had married Patricia Isabel Hansen in 1945, with whom he had two children.

== Notes ==
Parliament of Western Australia
Preceded by Crawford Nalder	Member for Katanning; 1974–1983	Abolished
New seat	Member for Katanning-Roe; 1983–1986	Succeeded by Monty House
Political offices
Preceded by Ray McPharlin	Minister for Agriculture; 1975–1983	Succeeded by David Evans
Preceded by Gordon Masters	Minister for Fisheries and Wildlife; 1982–1983	Succeeded by David Evans
