= Minister for Regional Development (Western Australia) =

Australian state cabinet office

- Incumbent; Don Punch since 14 December 2022
- Department of Regional Development
- Style: The Honourable
- Nominator: Premier of Western Australia
- Appointer: Governor of Western Australia
- Inaugural holder: Des O'Neil (as Minister for Regional Administration)
- Formation: 10 March 1977
- Website: Minister Alannah MacTiernan MLC

Minister for Regional Development is a position in the government of Western Australia, currently held by Don Punch of the Labor Party. The position was first created in 1977, for the government of Charles Court, and has existed in most governments since then. The minister is responsible for the state government's Department of Regional Development.

Prior to the creation of a regional development portfolio, there was a separate minister with responsibility for North-West Australia, called the Minister for North-West. That position has not existed since 1993. Additionally, in the Labor governments of the 1980s, 1990s, and 2000s, either some or all of the regions of Western Australia had specific ministers.

== List of regional development ministers ==
Ordinal	Minister(s)	Party	Office	Term start	Term end	Time in office
1	Des O'Neil	Liberal	Minister for Regional Administration	10 March 1977	5 March 1980	2 years, 361 days
2	Ray O'Connor	Liberal	Minister for Regional Administration	5 March 1980	12 February 1981	344 days
3	Peter Jones	National Country	Minister for Regional Administration	12 February 1981	25 January 1982	347 days
4	Barry MacKinnon	Liberal	Minister for Regional Administration	25 January 1982	11 June 1982	137 days
1982–1983: responsibilities held by Minister for Industrial, Commercial, and Regional Development
5	Julian Grill	Labor	Minister for Regional Development	25 February 1983	25 February 1986	3 years, 0 days
6	Jeff Carr	Labor	Minister for Regional Development	12 May 1986	28 February 1989	2 years, 276 days
7	Gordon Hill	Labor	Minister for Regional Development	28 February 1989	19 February 1990	356 days
8	Pam Buchanan	Labor	Minister for Regional Development	19 February 1990	20 December 1990	304 days
1990–1995: responsibilities held by other ministers
9	Hendy Cowan	National	Minister for Regional Development	10 February 1995	16 February 2001	6 years, 6 days
10	Tom Stephens	Labor	Minister for Regional Development	1 July 2001	16 September 2004	3 years, 77 days
11	Kim Chance	Labor	Minister for Regional Development	16 September 2004	21 September 2004	9 days
12	Ljiljanna Ravlich	Labor	Minister for Regional Development	21 September 2004	10 March 2005	170 days
13	John Bowler	Labor	Minister for Regional Development	10 March 2005	3 February 2006	330 days
14	Jon Ford	Labor	Minister for Regional Development	3 February 2006	23 September 2008	2 years, 233 days
15	Brendon Grylls	National	Minister for Regional Development	23 September 2008	11 December 2013	5 years, 79 days
16	Terry Redman	National	Minister for Regional Development	11 December 2013	17 March 2017	3 years, 96 days
17	Alannah MacTiernan	Labor	Minister for Regional Development	17 March 2017	14 December 2022	5 years, 272 days
18	Don Punch	Labor	Minister for Regional Development	14 December 2022	incumbent	3 years, 267 days

== List of ministers for specific regions ==
=== Gascoyne ===
Term start	Term end	Minister(s)	Party
26 November 1992	16 February 1993	Tom Stephens	Labor
1993–2001: no minister
16 February 2001	16 September 2004	Tom Stephens (again)	Labor
16 September 2004	21 September 2004	Kim Chance	Labor
21 September 2004	10 March 2005	Ljiljanna Ravlich	Labor
10 March 2005	23 September 2008	Jon Ford	Labor

=== Goldfields-Esperance ===
Term start	Term end	Minister(s)	Party
19 February 1990	16 February 1993	Ian Taylor	Labor
1993–2001: no minister
16 February 2001	1 July 2001	Clive Brown	Labor
1 July 2001	27 June 2003	Nick Griffiths	Labor
27 June 2003	16 September 2004	Tom Stephens	Labor
16 September 2004	21 September 2004	Kim Chance	Labor
21 September 2004	10 March 2005	Ljiljanna Ravlich	Labor
10 March 2005	2 March 2007	John Bowler	Labor
2 March 2007	23 September 2008	Ljiljanna Ravlich (again)	Labor

=== Great Southern ===
Term start	Term end	Minister(s)	Party
16 February 2001	10 March 2005	Kim Chance	Labor
10 March 2005	2 March 2007	John Bowler	Labor
2 March 2007	23 September 2008	Kim Chance (again)	Labor

=== Kimberley ===
Term start	Term end	Minister(s)	Party
16 February 2001	16 September 2004	Tom Stephens	Labor
16 September 2004	21 September 2004	Kim Chance	Labor
21 September 2004	10 March 2005	Ljiljanna Ravlich	Labor
10 March 2005	23 September 2008	Jon Ford	Labor

=== Mid-West ===
Term start	Term end	Minister(s)	Party
28 February 1989	5 February 1991	Jeff Carr	Labor
5 February 1991	7 September 1992	Gordon Hill	Labor
7 September 1992	26 November 1992	Ian Taylor	Labor
26 November 1992	16 February 1993	Tom Stephens	Labor
1993–2001: no minister
16 February 2001	23 September 2008	Kim Chance	Labor

=== North-West ===
Term start	Term end	Minister(s)	Party
17 May 1919	17 June 1923	Hal Colebatch	Nationalist
18 June 1923	15 April 1924	John Ewing	Liberal
1924–1933: no minister
24 April 1933	26 March 1935	Harry Millington	Labor
26 March 1935	15 July 1936	Frank Wise	Labor
1936–1939: no minister
29 March 1939	1 April 1947	Aubrey Coverley	Labor
1 April 1947	24 October 1950	Ross McLarty	Liberal
24 October 1950	3 January 1952	Garnet Wood	Country
17 January 1952	23 February 1953	Ross McLarty (again)	Liberal
23 February 1953	2 April 1959	Harry Strickland	Labor
1959–1971: no minister
12 October 1971	30 May 1973	Herb Graham	Labor
30 May 1973	8 April 1974	Arthur Bickerton	Labor
8 April 1974	5 June 1975	Alan Ridge	Liberal
5 June 1975	5 March 1980	Des O'Neil	Liberal
5 March 1980	12 February 1981	Ray O'Connor	Liberal
12 February 1981	25 January 1982	Peter Jones	National Country
25 January 1982	25 February 1983	Barry MacKinnon	Liberal
25 February 1983	25 July 1986	Julian Grill	Labor
25 July 1986	16 February 1993	Ernie Bridge	Labor

=== Peel ===
Term start	Term end	Minister(s)	Party
16 February 2001	27 June 2003	Jim McGinty	Labor
27 June 2003	10 March 2005	Bob Kucera	Labor
10 March 2005	3 February 2006	Mark McGowan	Labor
3 February 2006	9 November 2006	Norm Marlborough	Labor
9 November 2006	13 December 2006	Mark McGowan (again)	Labor
13 December 2006	23 September 2008	David Templeman	Labor

=== Pilbara ===
Term start	Term end	Minister(s)	Party
16 February 2001	16 September 2004	Tom Stephens	Labor
16 September 2004	21 September 2004	Kim Chance	Labor
21 September 2004	10 March 2005	Ljiljanna Ravlich	Labor
10 March 2005	23 September 2008	Jon Ford	Labor

=== South-West ===
Term start	Term end	Minister(s)	Party
25 February 1986	28 February 1989	Julian Grill	Labor
28 February 1989	16 February 1993	David Smith	Labor
1993–2001: no minister
16 February 2001	27 June 2003	Jim McGinty	Labor
27 June 2003	10 March 2005	Bob Kucera	Labor
10 March 2005	23 September 2008	Mark McGowan	Labor

=== Wheatbelt ===
Term start	Term end	Minister(s)	Party
26 November 1992	16 February 1993	Tom Stephens	Labor
1993–2001: no minister
16 February 2001	23 September 2008	Kim Chance	Labor

== See also ==
- Minister for Energy (Western Australia)
- Minister for Mines and Petroleum (Western Australia)
- Minister for State Development (Western Australia)
