= Minister for Forestry (Western Australia) =

The Minister for Forestry is a position in the Cabinet of Western Australia. The minister is responsible for the Forest Products Commission, an agency of the government of Western Australia, and may hold other portfolios in addition to forestry. The current Minister for Forestry is Jackie Jarvis of the Labor Party, who holds the position as a member of the Cook Labor Government.

The responsibilities now incorporated in the portfolio were originally held by the Colonial Secretary, and subsequently the Minister for Lands. A separate Minister for Forests was not appointed until the 1917 Lefroy Ministry, with the inaugural minister being Robert Robinson. From the late 1950s to the early 1980s the forests and lands portfolios were generally held by the same person, and for a brief period during the Court Ministry the two portfolios were merged, under the title Minister for Lands and Forests. The portfolio was again merged with others during the late 1980s and 1990s, with the minister responsible for forestry known as the Minister for Conservation and Land Management from 1985 to 1993 and as the Minister for Primary Industries from 1993 to 2001. Although the portfolio has since then often been held by the Minister for Agriculture or the Minister for Fisheries, it has been once again a standalone portfolio since 2006.

== List of ministers for forestry ==
Twenty people have been appointed as Minister for Forestry (or equivalent) in Western Australia, with William Bovell's 11 years and 335 days the longest time period in the position. In the table below, members of the Legislative Council are designated "MLC". All others were members of the Legislative Assembly at the time of their service. In Western Australia, serving ministers are entitled to be styled "The Honourable", and may retain the style after three years' service in the ministry.

Order	Minister	Party	Premier	Title	Term start	Term end	Term in office
1	Robert Robinson	Nationalist	Lefroy	Minister for Woods and Forests	28 June 1917	17 April 1919	1 year, 358 days
1	Robert Robinson	Nationalist	Colebatch	Minister for Forests	17 April 1919	17 May 1919	1 year, 358 days
1	Robert Robinson	Nationalist	Mitchell	Minister for Forests	17 May 1919	21 June 1919	1 year, 358 days
2	John Scaddan	Nationalist	Mitchell	Minister for Forests	24 April 1930	24 April 1933	3 years, 0 days
3	John Willcock	Labor	Willcock	Minister for Forests	20 August 1936	9 December 1943	7 years, 111 days
4	Ross McLarty	Liberal	McLarty	Minister for Forests	1 April 1947	5 January 1948	279 days
5	Robert McDonald	Liberal	McLarty	Minister for Forests	5 January 1948	7 October 1949	1 year, 275 days
– (4)	Ross McLarty	Liberal	McLarty	Minister for Forests	7 October 1949	24 October 1950	1 year, 17 days
5	Gerald Wild	Liberal	McLarty	Minister for Forests	24 October 1950	23 February 1953	2 years, 122 days
6	Herb Graham	Labor	Hawke	Minister for Forests	23 February 1953	2 April 1959	6 years, 38 days
7	William Bovell	Liberal	Brand	Minister for Forests	2 April 1959	3 March 1971	11 years, 335 days
8	Tom Evans	Labor	Tonkin	Minister for Forests	3 March 1971	12 October 1971	223 days
9	David Evans	Labor	Tonkin	Minister for Forests	12 October 1971	8 April 1974	2 years, 178 days
10	Alan Ridge	Liberal	C. Court	Minister for Forests	8 April 1974	10 March 1977	2 years, 336 days
11	June Craig	Liberal	C. Court	Minister for Lands and Forests	10 March 1977	25 August 1978	1 year, 168 days
12	David Wordsworth MLC	Liberal	C. Court	Minister for Lands and Forests	25 August 1978	25 January 1982	3 years, 153 days
13	Ian Laurance	Liberal	O'Connor	Minister for Forests	25 January 1982	25 February 1983	1 year, 31 days
14	Brian Burke	Labor	Burke	Minister for Forests	25 February 1983	22 March 1985	2 years, 25 days
15	Monty House	National	R. Court	Minister for Primary Industries	16 February 1993	16 February 2001	8 years, 0 days
16	Kim Chance MLC	Labor	Gallop	Minister for Forestry	16 February 2001	1 July 2001	7 years, 220 days
16	Kim Chance MLC	Labor	Gallop	Minister for Agriculture, Forestry, and Fisheries	1 July 2001	10 March 2005	3 years, 252 days
16	Kim Chance MLC	Labor	Gallop	Minister for Agriculture and Forestry	10 March 2005	25 January 2006	321 days
16	Kim Chance MLC	Labor	Carpenter	Minister for Agriculture and Forestry	25 January 2006	3 February 2006	9 days
16	Kim Chance MLC	Labor	Carpenter	Minister for Forestry	3 February 2006	23 September 2008	2 years, 233 days
17	Terry Redman	National	Barnett	Minister for Forestry	23 September 2008	11 December 2013	5 years, 79 days
18	Mia Davies	National	Barnett	Minister for Forestry	11 December 2013	17 March 2017	3 years, 96 days
19	Dave Kelly	Labor	McGowan	Minister for Forestry	17 March 2017	14 December 2022	5 years, 272 days
20	Jackie Jarvis	Labor	McGowan	Minister for Forestry	14 December 2022	8 June 2023	2 years, 93 days
20	Jackie Jarvis	Labor	Cook	Minister for Forestry	8 June 2023	incumbent	2 years, 93 days

== List of assistant ministers for forestry ==
Order	Minister	Party	Premier	Title	Term start	Term end	Term in office
1	David Evans	Labor	Burke	Minister assisting the Minister for Forests	25 February 1983	22 March 1985	2 years, 25 days

== See also ==
- Minister for the Environment (Western Australia)
