= Minister for Agriculture and Food (Western Australia) =

- Incumbent; Jackie Jarvis MLC since 14 December 2022
- Department of Primary Industries and Regional Development
- Style: The Honourable
- Nominator: Premier of Western Australia
- Appointer: Governor of Western Australia
- Inaugural holder: John Drew MLC (as Minister for Agriculture)
- Formation: 7 June 1905
- Website: https://www.wa.gov.au/government/premier-and-cabinet-ministers/jackie-jarvis

The Minister for Agriculture and Food is a position in the Cabinet of Western Australia. The minister is responsible for the Department of Agriculture and Food, and usually holds several other portfolios.

The responsibilities now incorporated in the portfolio were originally held by the Colonial Secretary, and it was not until the 1904 Daglish Ministry that a separate Minister for Agriculture was appointed, with the inaugural minister being the nominally independent John Drew. From its first implementation through to the 1920s, and sporadically afterward, the titles of Minister for Agriculture and Minister for Lands were generally held by the same person, although the positions were legally separate, and were quite different in scope. A similar situation has existed since the late 1970s with the Fisheries and Forests portfolios. The minister's title was simply "Minister for Agriculture" until 1993, when Monty House was made Minister for Primary Industries in the Court–Cowan Ministry. The current title was implemented in 2005.

The current Minister for Agriculture and Food is Jackie Jarvis of the Labor Party. The previous Minister for Agriculture and Food was Mark Lewis of the Liberal Party. Lewis was only the third Liberal to hold the position – in previous Coalition governments, the position has been reserved for members of the National Party (and its predecessors).

== List of ministers for agriculture and food ==
Thirty three people have been appointed as Minister for Agriculture and Food (or equivalent) in Western Australia, with Crawford Nalder's 11 years and 335 days the longest time period in the position. In the table below, members of the Legislative Council are designated "MLC". All others were members of the Legislative Assembly at the time of their service. In Western Australia, serving ministers are entitled to be styled "The Honourable", and may retain the style after three years' service in the ministry.

Order	Minister	Party	Premier	Title	Term start	Term end	Term in office
1	John Drew MLC	Independent	Daglish	Minister for Agriculture	7 June 1905	25 August 1905	79 days
2	Newton Moore	Ministerialist	Rason	Minister for Agriculture	25 August 1905	7 May 1906	255 days
3	Frank Wilson	Ministerialist	Moore	Minister for Agriculture	7 May 1906	30 June 1909	3 years, 54 days
4	James Mitchell	Ministerialist	Moore	Minister for Agriculture	30 June 1909	16 September 1910	2 years, 99 days
4	James Mitchell	Liberal	Wilson	Minister for Agriculture	16 September 1910	7 October 1911	2 years, 99 days
5	Thomas Bath	Labor	Scaddan	Minister for Agriculture	7 October 1911	23 November 1914	3 years, 47 days
6	William Johnson	Labor	Scaddan	Minister for Agriculture	23 November 1914	27 July 1916	1 year, 247 days
7	Sir Henry Lefroy KCMG	Liberal	Wilson	Minister for Agriculture	27 July 1916	28 July 1917	2 years, 264 days
7	Sir Henry Lefroy KCMG	Nationalist	Lefroy	Minister for Agriculture	28 July 1917	17 April 1919	2 years, 264 days
8	Charles Baxter MLC	Country	Colebatch	Minister for Agriculture	17 April 1919	17 May 1919	30 days
9	Hal Colebatch MLC	Nationalist	Mitchell	Minister for Agriculture	17 May 1919	3 April 1921	1 year, 351 days
10	Henry Kennedy Maley	Country	Mitchell	Minister for Agriculture	3 April 1921	15 April 1924	3 years, 12 days
11	Michael Troy	Labor	Collier	Minister for Agriculture	15 April 1924	15 December 1927	3 years, 244 days
12	Harry Millington	Labor	Collier	Minister for Agriculture	15 December 1927	23 April 1930	2 years, 129 days
13	Percy Ferguson	Country	Mitchell	Minister for Agriculture	23 April 1930	24 April 1933	3 years, 1 day
– (12)	Harry Millington	Labor	Collier	Minister for Agriculture	24 April 1933	26 March 1935	1 year, 336 days
14	Frank Wise	Labor	Collier	Minister for Agriculture	26 March 1935	19 August 1936	10 years, 130 days
14	Frank Wise	Labor	Willcock	Minister for Agriculture	19 August 1936	31 July 1945	10 years, 130 days
14	Frank Wise	Labor	Wise	Minister for Agriculture	31 July 1945	3 August 1945	10 years, 130 days
15	John Tonkin	Labor	Wise	Minister for Agriculture	3 August 1945	1 April 1947	1 year, 241 days
16	Lindsay Thorn	Country	McLarty	Minister for Agriculture	1 April 1947	5 January 1948	279 days
17	Garnet Wood MLC	Country	McLarty	Honorary Minister for Agriculture	5 January 1948	24 October 1950	3 years, 363 days
17	Garnet Wood MLC	Country	McLarty	Minister for Agriculture	24 October 1950	3 January 1952	3 years, 363 days
18	Sir Charles Latham MLC	Country	McLarty	Minister for Agriculture	3 January 1952	23 February 1953	1 year, 79 days
19	Ernest Hoar	Labor	Hawke	Minister for Agriculture	23 February 1953	17 December 1957	4 years, 297 days
20	Lionel Kelly	Labor	Hawke	Minister for Agriculture	17 December 1957	2 April 1959	1 year, 106 days
21	Crawford Nalder	Country	Brand	Minister for Agriculture	2 April 1959	3 March 1971	11 years, 335 days
22	David Evans	Labor	Tonkin	Minister for Agriculture	3 March 1971	8 April 1974	3 years, 36 days
23	Ray McPharlin	National Alliance	Court	Minister for Agriculture	8 April 1974	20 May 1975	1 year, 42 days
24	Dick Old	National Country	Court	Minister for Agriculture	5 June 1975	25 January 1982	7 years, 263 days
24	Dick Old	National Country	O'Connor	Minister for Agriculture	25 January 1982	23 February 1983	7 years, 263 days
– (22)	David Evans	Labor	Burke	Minister for Agriculture	23 February 1983	26 February 1986	3 years, 3 days
25	Julian Grill	Labor	Burke	Minister for Agriculture	26 February 1986	25 February 1988	3 years, 2 days
25	Julian Grill	Labor	Dowding	Minister for Agriculture	25 February 1988	28 February 1989	3 years, 2 days
26	Ernie Bridge	Labor	Dowding	Minister for Agriculture	28 February 1989	12 February 1990	3 years, 354 days
26	Ernie Bridge	Labor	Lawrence	Minister for Agriculture	12 February 1990	16 February 1993	3 years, 354 days
27	Monty House	National	Court	Minister for Primary Industries	16 February 1993	16 February 2001	8 years, 0 days
28	Kim Chance	Labor	Gallop	Minister for Agriculture	16 February 2001	1 July 2001	7 years, 220 days
28	Kim Chance	Labor	Gallop	Minister for Agriculture, Forestry, and Fisheries	1 July 2001	10 March 2005	7 years, 220 days
28	Kim Chance	Labor	Gallop	Minister for Agriculture and Forestry	10 March 2005	25 January 2006	7 years, 220 days
28	Kim Chance	Labor	Carpenter	Minister for Agriculture and Forestry	25 January 2006	3 February 2006	7 years, 220 days
28	Kim Chance	Labor	Carpenter	Minister for Agriculture and Food	3 February 2006	23 September 2008	7 years, 220 days
29	Terry Redman	National	Barnett	Minister for Agriculture and Food	23 September 2008	21 March 2013	4 years, 179 days
30	Ken Baston MLC	Liberal	Barnett	Minister for Agriculture and Food	21 March 2013	31 March 2016	3 years, 10 days
31	Dean Nalder	Liberal	Barnett	Minister for Agriculture and Food	31 March 2016	20 September 2016	173 days
32	Mark Lewis	Liberal	Barnett	Minister for Agriculture and Food	22 September 2016	17 March 2017	9 years, 350 days
33	Alannah MacTiernan MLC	Labor	McGowan	Minister for Agriculture and Food	17 March 2017	14 December 2022	5 years, 272 days
34	Jackie Jarvis	Labor	McGowan	Minister for Agriculture and Food	14 December 2022	8 June 2023	3 years, 269 days
34	Jackie Jarvis	Labor	Cook	Minister for Agriculture and Food	8 June 2023	incumbent	3 years, 269 days
