= David Wordsworth =

Australian politician

The Honourable David Wordsworth

Member of the Legislative Council of Western Australia
- In office 22 May 1971 – 21 May 1989
- Preceded by: Edward House
- Succeeded by: None (seat abolished)
- Constituency: South Province
- In office 22 May 1989 – 21 May 1993 Serving with Brown, Caldwell, Chance, Charlton, McAleer
- Constituency: Agricultural

Personal details
- Born: 9 June 1930 Kashmir, India
- Died: 24 June 2024 (aged 94)
- Party: Liberal

David John Wordsworth (9 June 1930 – 24 June 2024) was an Australian politician who was a Liberal Party member of the Western Australian Legislative Council from 1971 to 1993. He served as a minister in the government of Sir Charles Court.

Wordsworth was born in Kashmir, India, to Margaret Joan (née Reynolds) and Robert Wordsworth. His Australian-born father was a British Indian Army general, and settled in Tasmania after World War II, eventually being elected to the Australian Senate. Wordsworth was educated at Launceston Grammar School and Geelong Grammar School (the latter in Victoria), and went on to study agriculture at New Zealand's Lincoln College. He initially farmed at Hagley, Tasmania, but left for Western Australia in 1961, buying a property near Esperance. In 1958, he had married Marie Louise Johnston, a daughter of Bertie Johnston (a former senator). The couple had three children.

Wordsworth was elected to the Shire of Esperance council in 1969, and at the 1971 state election was elected to the Legislative Council's South Province. After the 1977 election, he was named Minister for Transport in the Court government. Following a ministerial reshuffle in August 1978, he was instead appointed Minister for Lands and Minister for Forests, titles which he would hold until Court resigned as premier in January 1982. The Legislative Council was reformed prior to the 1989 state election, and Wordsworth transferred to the new Agricultural region. He served only a single four-year term before leaving parliament. Wordsworth retired to Perth, and was a member of the senate of Murdoch University from 1994 to 1998.

== Personal life ==
Wordsworth died on 24 June 2024. He and his wife were avid collectors of Australian historical items, including paintings, documents and furniture from the early colonial period. Their collection, previously housed at their residence in Peppermint Grove, was auctioned in 2025 including a rare portrait of inaugural Western Australian governor James Stirling which sold for $110,000.

Political offices
| Preceded by Ray O'Connor | Minister for Transport; 1977–1978 | Succeeded by Cyril Rushton |
| Preceded by June Craig | Minister for Lands; 1978–1982 | Succeeded by Ian Laurance |
| Preceded by June Craig | Minister for Forests; 1978–1982 | Succeeded by Ian Laurance |
