= Minister for Planning and Lands =

Cabinet position in Western Australia

Minister for Lands of Government of Western Australia
- Incumbent; John Carey since 8 June 2023

Minister for Planning and Lands is a position in the government of Western Australia, currently held by John Carey of the Labor Party. The position was first created in 1870, under the name Commissioner of Crown Lands, at a time when Western Australia was still a British colony and had not yet achieved responsible government. Except for a brief period between 2001 and 2003, it has existed in every government since then. The minister is currently responsible for the state government's Land Use Management division comprising part of the Department of Planning, Lands and Heritage, which is responsible for the management of crown land in Western Australia.

== Titles ==
- 18 December 1870 – 27 May 1901: Commissioner of Crown Lands
- 27 May 1901 – 25 February 1983: Minister for Lands
- 25 February 1983 – 25 February 1986: Minister for Lands and Surveys
- 25 February 1986 – 16 February 2001: Minister for Lands
- 27 June 2003 – 23 September 2008: Minister for Land Information
- 23 September 2008 – 19 March 2025: Minister for Lands
- 19 March 2025 – present: Minister for Planning and Lands

== List of ministers ==
Term start	Term end	Minister	Party
18 December 1870	9 April 1883	Malcolm Fraser	None
10 July 1883	9 June 1887	John Forrest	None
9 June 1887	4 January 1888	J. C. H. James	None
6 March 1888	21 October 1890	John Forrest (again)	None
29 December 1890	4 December 1894	William Marmion	None
4 December 1894	13 March 1897	Alexander Richardson	Ministerial
13 March 1897	14 February 1901	George Throssell	Ministerial
15 February 1901	27 May 1901	Charles Moran	Ministerial
27 May 1901	21 November 1901	Charles Sommers	Ministerial
21 November 1901	23 December 1901	John Nanson	Ministerial
23 December 1901	23 January 1903	Adam Jameson	Ministerial
23 January 1903	10 August 1904	John Hopkins	Ministerial
10 August 1904	7 June 1905	John Drew	Independent
7 June 1905	25 August 1905	Thomas Bath	Labor
25 August 1905	30 June 1909	Newton Moore	Ministerial
30 June 1909	7 October 1911	James Mitchell	Ministerial
17 October 1911	23 November 1914	Thomas Bath (again)	Labor
23 November 1914	27 July 1916	William Johnson	Labor
27 July 1916	17 April 1919	Henry Lefroy	Lib./Nat.
17 April 1919	15 April 1924	James Mitchell (again)	Nationalist
16 April 1924	30 April 1927	William Angwin	Labor
30 April 1927	23 April 1930	Frank Troy	Labor
24 April 1930	24 April 1933	Charles Latham	Country
24 April 1933	15 March 1939	Frank Troy (again)	Labor
15 March 1939	3 August 1945	Frank Wise	Labor
3 August 1945	1 April 1947	Alexander Panton	Labor
1 April 1947	23 February 1953	Lindsay Thorn	Country
23 February 1953	17 December 1957	Ernest Hoar	Labor
17 December 1957	2 April 1959	Lionel Kelly	Labor
2 April 1959	3 March 1971	Stewart Bovell	Liberal
3 March 1971	8 April 1974	David Evans	Labor
8 April 1974	10 March 1977	Alan Ridge	Liberal
10 March 1977	25 August 1978	June Craig	Liberal
25 August 1978	25 January 1982	David Wordsworth	Liberal
25 January 1982	25 February 1983	Ian Laurance	Liberal
25 February 1983	25 February 1986	Ken McIver	Labor
25 February 1986	16 March 1987	Ian Taylor	Labor
16 March 1987	25 February 1988	Keith Wilson	Labor
25 February 1988	28 February 1989	Yvonne Henderson	Labor
28 February 1989	5 February 1991	Kay Hallahan	Labor
5 February 1991	16 February 1993	David Smith	Labor
16 February 1993	26 April 1996	George Cash	Liberal
26 April 1996	9 January 1997	Graham Kierath	Liberal
9 January 1997	16 February 2001	Doug Shave	Liberal
22 December 1999	16 February 2001	Rob Johnson	Liberal
2001–2003: no minister – responsibilities held by the Minister for Planning and Infrastructure
27 June 2003	10 March 2005	Nick Griffiths	Labor
10 March 2005	3 February 2006	John Bowler	Labor
3 February 2006	23 September 2008	Michelle Roberts	Labor
23 September 2008	11 December 2013	Brendon Grylls	National
11 December 2013	17 March 2017	Terry Redman	National
17 March 2017	13 December 2018	Rita Saffioti	Labor
13 December 2018	13 March 2021	Ben Wyatt	Labor
19 March 2021	21 December 2021	Tony Buti	Labor
21 December 2021	Incumbent	John Carey	Labor

== See also ==
- Minister for Agriculture and Food (Western Australia)
- Minister for the Environment (Western Australia)
- Minister for Fisheries (Western Australia)
- Minister for Forestry (Western Australia)
- Minister for Water (Western Australia)
- Surveyor-General of Western Australia
- Commissioner of Crown Lands (Australia)
- DevelopmentWA
