= Des O'Neil =

Australian politician

The Honourable Sir Des O'Neil
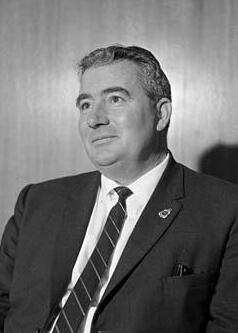

Deputy Premier of Western Australia
- In office 5 June 1975 – 5 March 1980
- Premier: Sir Charles Court
- Preceded by: Ray McPharlin
- Succeeded by: Ray O'Connor

Deputy Leader of the Liberal Party in Western Australia
- In office 5 June 1972 – 5 March 1980
- Preceded by: Charles Court
- Succeeded by: Ray O'Connor

Member of the Legislative Assembly of Western Australia
- In office 21 March 1959 – 31 March 1962
- Preceded by: William Gaffy
- Succeeded by: Don May
- Constituency: Canning
- In office 31 March 1962 – 23 February 1980
- Preceded by: None (new seat)
- Succeeded by: Anthony Trethowan
- Constituency: East Melville

Personal details
- Born: 27 September 1920 Subiaco, Western Australia, Australia
- Died: 25 September 1999 (aged 78) Wilson, Western Australia, Australia
- Party: Liberal

Sir Desmond Henry O'Neil (27 September 1920 – 25 September 1999) was an Australian politician who was a Liberal Party member of the Legislative Assembly of Western Australia from 1959 to 1980. He was a minister in the governments of Sir David Brand and Sir Charles Court, and served as deputy premier to Court between 1975 and 1980.

== Early life ==
Born in Perth, to Lillian Frances (née Egan) and Henry McLelland O'Neil, O'Neil went to Aquinas College, and later attended Claremont Teachers College. Enlisting in the Citizen Military Forces and later the Australian Imperial Force, during World War II he saw service in New Guinea, serving with the signal corps of the 3rd Division with the rank of captain. On returning to Australia, O'Neil worked as a schoolteacher in country Western Australia, and was headmaster of schools at Roebourne, Dowerin, Wilga, Nyamup, and Donnelly River.

== Politics ==
At the 1959 state election, O'Neil contested the seat of Canning, located in the southern suburbs of Perth, despite having only joined the Liberal Party the previous year. The seat had been held by Labor candidate William Gaffy since 1956 (and by Labor since 1953), but O'Neil secured 51.04% on first preferences as David Brand's Liberal–Country coalition won the first of four consecutive elections.

At the 1962 election, O'Neil successfully transferred to the newly created seat of East Melville, which was a safe seat for the Liberals throughout its existence. His old seat of Canning was lost to the Labor candidate, Don May. After the 1965 election, O'Neil was made Minister for Housing and Minister for Labour, positions that he held until the Brand government's defeat at the 1971 election. Following Brand's retirement as leader of the Liberal Party in 1972, Charles Court, his deputy, was elected to succeed him as Leader of the Opposition, with O'Neil replacing Court as deputy leader. John Tonkin's one-term Labor government was defeated in 1974, and O'Neil was made Minister for Housing, Minister for Works, and Minister for Water Supplies. Court initially governed in coalition with the National Country Party, led by Ray McPharlin, but the coalition collapsed in May 1975, and O'Neil consequently replaced McPharlin as deputy premier when a new ministry was constituted the following month, also becoming Minister for the North-West. The ministry was again reconstituted following the 1977 election, with O'Neil losing the housing, works, and water portfolios, but gaining the roles of Chief Secretary, Minister for Police, and Minister for Regional Administration.

== Later life ==
O'Neil remained deputy premier and minister until his retirement at the 1980 state election, with Anthony Trethowan succeeding him in East Melville. He had been created a knight bachelor in the 1980 New Year Honours. Following his retirement, he served as chairman of the State Lotteries Commission from 1980 to 1984, and was also chairman of the WA Greyhound Racing Association from 1981 to 1985. O'Neil died at Castledare Retirement Village in 1999. He had married Nancy Jean Culver in 1944, with whom he had two daughters.

Parliament of Western Australia
Preceded by William Gaffy	Member for Canning; 1959–1962	Succeeded by Don May
New seat	Member for East Melville; 1962–1980	Succeeded by Anthony Trethowan
Political offices
Preceded by Ray McPharlin	Deputy Premier; 1975–1980	Succeeded by Ray O'Connor
Preceded by Arthur Griffith; Arthur Bickerton	Minister for Housing; 1965–1971; 1974–1977	Succeeded by Don Taylor; Ray O'Connor
Preceded by Gerald Wild	Minister for Labour; 1965–1971	Succeeded by Don Taylor
Preceded by Colin Jamieson	Minister for Works; 1974–1977	Succeeded by Ray O'Connor
Preceded by Colin Jamieson	Minister for Water Supplies; 1974–1977	Succeeded by Ray O'Connor
Preceded by Alan Ridge	Minister for the North-West; 1975–1980	Succeeded by Ray O'Connor
Preceded by Neil McNeill	Chief Secretary; 1977–1980	Succeeded by Bill Hassell
Preceded by Ray O'Connor	Minister for Police; 1977–1980	Succeeded by Bill Hassell
Preceded by position created	Minister for Regional Administration; 1977–1980	Succeeded by Ray O'Connor
