= Barry MacKinnon =

Australian politician

The Honourable Barry MacKinnon AM

Leader of the Opposition and Leader of the Liberal Party
- In office 25 November 1986 – 12 May 1992
- Premier: Brian Burke; Peter Dowding; Carmen Lawrence
- Deputy: Ian Laurance; Richard Court
- Preceded by: Bill Hassell
- Succeeded by: Richard Court

Member of the Legislative Assembly of Western Australia
- In office 19 February 1977 – 4 February 1989
- Preceded by: None (new seat)
- Succeeded by: None (seat abolished)
- Constituency: Murdoch
- In office 4 February 1989 – 6 February 1993
- Preceded by: None (new seat)
- Succeeded by: Mike Board
- Constituency: Jandakot

Personal details
- Born: 29 October 1944 (age 81) Perth, Western Australia
- Party: Liberal
- Education: University of Western Australia

Barry John MacKinnon AM (born 29 October 1944) is a former Australian politician who was a Liberal Party member of the Legislative Assembly of Western Australia from 1977 to 1993. He was the state leader of the Liberal Party (and thus Leader of the Opposition) from 1986 to 1992, although he led the party at only one election (in 1989). MacKinnon had earlier served as a minister in the governments of Sir Charles Court and Ray O'Connor. He worked as an accountant before entering politics, and since leaving parliament has involved himself in various community organisations.

== Early life ==
MacKinnon was born in Perth to Beryl (née Mounsey) and Keith MacKinnon, his father being a builder. His uncle, Graham MacKinnon, was a government minister and long-serving Liberal member of the WA Legislative Council, and the two served together in parliament from 1977 to 1986. MacKinnon was raised in Bridgetown (a small town in the South West), and attended Bridgetown High School before going to Perth to board at Wesley College. He later went on to the University of Western Australia, where he graduated with a Bachelor of Economics and a diploma in accounting. Before entering politics, MacKinnon worked as an accountant. He began as a clerk with Bushells (a tea company), and subsequently spent several years with a Perth-based firm before starting his own business.

== Political career ==
MacKinnon was elected to the seat of Murdoch in 1977. He switched to the seat of Jandakot in 1989 when Murdoch was abolished. He represented Jandakot until he retired at the 1993 state election.

MacKinnon became Leader of the Opposition in February 1986, replacing Bill Hassell. He served as a shadow to three Labor premiers - Brian Burke, Peter Dowding and Carmen Lawrence - over six years. At the 1989 election against Dowding, he led the Liberals to a majority of the two-party vote and took four seats off Labor. However, he still came up nine seats short of becoming premier.

By 1992, the Labor government was reeling from the WA Inc scandal. With a state election due the following year, under normal circumstances MacKinnon should have been an unbackable favourite to become premier. However, while the Liberals were well ahead of Labor in opinion polling, MacKinnon consistently trailed incumbent Carmen Lawrence as preferred premier. With this in mind, deputy leader Richard Court challenged MacKinnon's leadership and won, ousting MacKinnon by 20 votes to 12. Court became Premier only nine months later.

MacKinnon's leadership came to an end on 12 May 1992 just a day after that of his South Australian Liberal counterpart Dale Baker.

== Honours ==
In 1997 MacKinnon was made a Member of the Order of Australia for services to people with hearing impairments. He also received a Centenary Medal in 2001.

Parliament of Western Australia
New seat	Member for Murdoch; 1977–1989	Abolished
New seat	Member for Jandakot; 1989–1993	Succeeded by Mike Board
Political offices
Preceded by Peter Jones	Minister for Industrial Development and Commerce; 1982–1983	Succeeded by Mal Bryce
Preceded by Peter Jones	Minister for Tourism; 1982–1983	Succeeded by Brian Burke
Preceded by Peter Jones	Minister for Regional Administration; 1982–1983	Succeeded by Julian Grill
Preceded by Peter Jones	Minister for the North-West; 1982–1983	Succeeded by Julian Grill
Party political offices
Preceded by Bill Hassell	Leader of the Liberal Party (in WA); 1986–1992	Succeeded by Richard Court
