= June Craig =

Australian politician

The Honourable June Craig AM

Member of the Legislative Assembly of Western Australia
- In office 30 March 1974 – 19 February 1983
- Preceded by: Iven Manning
- Succeeded by: none (constituency abolished)
- Constituency: Wellington

Minister for Local Government
- In office 25 August 1978 – 25 February 1983
- Premier: Charles Court; Ray O'Connor
- Preceded by: Cyril Rushton
- Succeeded by: Jeff Carr

Minister for Urban Development and Town Planning
- In office 25 August 1978 – 25 February 1983
- Premier: Charles Court; Ray O'Connor
- Preceded by: Cyril Rushton
- Succeeded by: David Parker

Minister for Lands and Forests
- In office 10 March 1977 – 25 August 1978
- Premier: Charles Court
- Preceded by: Alan Ridge
- Succeeded by: David Wordsworth

Personal details
- Born: Margaret June Lynn; 8 December 1930 (age 95) Perth, Western Australia
- Party: Liberal
- Education: University of Western Australia; University of Melbourne

Margaret June Craig AM (née Lynn; born 8 December 1930) is a former Australian politician who was a Liberal Party member of the Legislative Assembly of Western Australia from 1974 to 1983, representing the seat of Wellington. She was a minister in the governments of Sir Charles Court and Ray O'Connor, and was only the second woman in Western Australia to serve as a government minister (after Dame Florence Cardell-Oliver).

== Early life ==
Craig was born in Perth, and went to Presbyterian Ladies' College in Peppermint Grove. An excellent sportswoman, she represented Western Australia at tennis, and later studied physical education at the University of Western Australia and the University of Melbourne. In 1951, she married Frank Craig, whose father, Les Craig, was a member of the Legislative Council for over 20 years. Her own great-grandfather, Robert John Lynn, had also sat in the Legislative Council.

== Politics ==
A member of the Liberal Party since 1950, Craig was elected to the seat of Wellington, in the state's south-west region, at the 1974 state election, becoming the first woman in the Legislative Assembly since Dame Florence Cardell-Oliver's retirement in 1956 (and the fourth woman overall). Following the Court government's retention at the 1977 state election, she was named Minister for Lands and Forests, becoming only the second woman to serve in a WA cabinet. The ministry was reconstituted in 1978 after a portfolio reshuffle, with Craig now Minister for Local Government and Minister for Urban Development and Town Planning. The latter portfolio was regarded by previous ministers as difficult, and Craig later wrote that she was disappointed she had failed to implement a "grand reshaping" of the town-planning system, despite the introduction of several smaller "technical" changes.

Following the 1980 state election, at which the government was again returned, there was speculation that the premier, Sir Charles Court, would retire. Craig was considered a potential candidate to replace him (along with Bill Grayden, Cyril Rushton, Ray Young, Jim Clarko, and his deputy, Ray O'Connor), but had little partyroom support. Court eventually resigned in early 1982, and was replaced by O'Connor, who retained Craig in his new ministry. The seat of Wellington was abolished in a redistribution prior to the 1983 election, and was largely incorporated into a new seat, Murray-Wellington. Despite this new seat being regarded as safer, Craig chose to contest another new seat, Mitchell, which incorporated areas on the outskirts of Bunbury. At the election, won by Labor in a landslide, Mitchell was won by Labor's candidate, David Smith. Craig was one of four ministers to lose their seats, along with Young, Bob Pike, and Richard Shalders. Both before and after her parliamentary career, she had been involved in community and charitable organisations, notably as the national president of the Save the Children Fund. She was named a Member of the Order of Australia (postnominals AM) in 1994, for "service to the community".

== See also ==
- Women in the Western Australian Legislative Assembly

Parliament of Western Australia
Preceded by Iven Manning	Member for Wellington; 1974–1983	Succeeded by Constituency abolished
Political offices
Preceded by Alan Ridge	Minister for Lands and Forests; 1977–1978	Succeeded by David Wordsworth
Preceded by Cyril Rushton	Minister for Local Government; 1978–1983	Succeeded by Jeff Carr
Preceded by Cyril Rushton	Minister for Urban Development and Town Planning; 1978–1983	Succeeded by David Parker (as Minister for Planning)
