= Leon Watt =

Australian politician

Leon Harold Watt (born 6 February 1937) is an Australian politician. He was a Liberal Party member of the Western Australian Legislative Assembly from 1974 to 1993, representing the electorate of Albany. Watt won the seat at the 1974 after eighteen years of Labor control and was re-elected five times, only being seriously challenged when the O'Connor Liberal government lost office in 1983. He retired at the 1993 election.

Western Australian Legislative Assembly
Preceded by Wyndham Cook	Member for Albany; 1974–1993	Succeeded by Kevin Prince
