= Deputy Premier of Western Australia =

Australian state government role

- Western Australian coat of arms

- Flag of Western Australia
- Incumbent; Rita Saffioti since 8 June 2023
- Department of the Premier and Cabinet
- Style: The Honourable
- Member of: Parliament; Cabinet; Executive Council
- Reports to: Premier of Western Australia
- Seat: Dumas House, Perth
- Nominator: Premier of Western Australia
- Appointer: Governor of Western Australia on the advice of the premier
- Term length: At the governor's pleasure
- Formation: 7 December 1955
- First holder: John Tonkin

The deputy premier of Western Australia is a role in the Government of Western Australia assigned to a responsible Minister in the Australian state of Western Australia. It has second ranking behind the premier of Western Australia in Cabinet, and its holder serves as acting premier during absence or incapacity of the premier. The role was only formally established on 7 December 1955, but had existed in practice since the earliest days of responsible government.

== List of deputy premiers of Western Australia ==
Political parties

Labor Party Country/National Liberal Party

No.	Name	Portrait	Term of office	
1	John Tonkin		7 December 1955	2 April 1959
2	Arthur Watts		2 April 1959	31 January 1962
3	Crawford Nalder		1 February 1962	3 March 1971
4	Herb Graham		3 March 1971	30 May 1973
5	Don Taylor		30 May 1973	8 April 1974
6	Ray McPharlin		8 April 1974	20 May 1975
7	Des O'Neil		5 June 1975	5 March 1980
8	Ray O'Connor		5 March 1980	25 January 1982
9	Cyril Rushton		25 January 1982	25 February 1983
10	Mal Bryce		25 February 1983	25 February 1988
11	David Parker		25 February 1988	13 February 1990
12	Ian Taylor		13 February 1990	16 February 1993
13	Hendy Cowan		16 February 1993	16 February 2001
14	Eric Ripper		16 February 2001	23 September 2008
15	Kim Hames		23 September 2008	16 February 2016
16	Liza Harvey		16 February 2016	17 March 2017
17	Roger Cook		17 March 2017	8 June 2023
18	Rita Saffioti		8 June 2023	present
