= Minister for Health (Western Australia) =

Minister for Health is a position in the government of Western Australia, currently held by Meredith Hammat of the Labor Party. The position was first created in 1919, in the first ministry formed by James Mitchell, and has existed in every government since, with the minister being responsible for the Department for Health. Prior to 1919, the minister responsible for public health was the Colonial Secretary.

== Titles ==
- 17 May 1919 – 15 April 1924: Minister for Public Health
- 16 April 1924 – present: Minister for Health

== List of ministers ==
Term start	Term end	Minister	Party
17 May 1919	3 April 1921	Hal Colebatch	Nationalist
13 April 1921	22 August 1922	Frank Broun	Country
22 August 1922	15 April 1924	Richard Sampson	Country
16 April 1924	30 April 1927	John Drew	Labor
30 April 1927	23 April 1930	Selby Munsie	Labor
24 April 1930	24 April 1933	Charles Latham	Country
24 April 1933	12 March 1938	Selby Munsie (again)	Labor
24 March 1938	3 August 1945	Alexander Panton	Labor
3 August 1945	1 April 1947	Emil Nulsen	Labor
1 April 1947	5 January 1948	Hubert Parker	Liberal
5 January 1948	7 October 1949	Arthur Abbott	Liberal
7 October 1949	23 February 1953	Florence Cardell-Oliver	Liberal
23 February 1953	2 April 1959	Emil Nulsen (again)	Labor
2 April 1959	17 August 1965	Ross Hutchinson	Liberal
17 August 1965	3 March 1971	Graham MacKinnon	Liberal
3 March 1971	8 April 1974	Ron Davies	Labor
8 April 1974	20 May 1975	Norm Baxter	National Country
20 May 1975	5 June 1975	Graham MacKinnon (again)	Liberal
5 June 1975	10 March 1977	Norm Baxter (again)	National Country
10 March 1977	25 August 1978	Alan Ridge	Liberal
25 August 1978	25 February 1983	Ray Young	Liberal
25 February 1983	25 February 1986	Barry Hodge	Labor
25 February 1986	25 February 1988	Ian Taylor	Labor
25 February 1988	13 November 1992	Keith Wilson	Labor
26 November 1992	16 February 1993	Ian Taylor (again)	Labor
16 February 1993	10 February 1995	Peter Foss	Liberal
10 February 1995	21 December 1995	Graham Kierath	Liberal
21 December 1995	28 July 1998	Kevin Prince	Liberal
28 July 1998	16 February 2001	John Day	Liberal
16 February 2001	17 June 2003	Bob Kucera	Labor
27 June 2003	23 September 2008	Jim McGinty	Labor
23 September 2008	31 March 2016	Kim Hames	Liberal
31 March 2016	17 March 2017	John Day (again)	Liberal
17 March 2017	21 December 2021	Roger Cook	Labor
21 December 2021	19 March 2025	Amber-Jade Sanderson	Labor
19 March 2025		Meredith Hammat	Labor

== See also ==
- Minister for Mental Health (Western Australia)
