= Alan Ridge =

Australian politician (1934–2026)

The Honourable Alan Ridge

Member of the Legislative Assembly of Western Australia
- In office 23 March 1968 – 23 February 1980
- Preceded by: John Rhatigan
- Succeeded by: Ernie Bridge
- Constituency: Kimberley

Personal details
- Born: 18 July 1934 Perth, Western Australia, Australia
- Died: 6 March 2026 (aged 91) Perth, Western Australia, Australia
- Party: Liberal

Keith Alan Ridge (18 July 1934 – 6 March 2026) was an Australian politician who was a Liberal Party member of the Legislative Assembly of Western Australia from 1968 to 1980, representing the seat of Kimberley. He was a minister in the government of Sir Charles Court.

== Life and career ==
Ridge was born in Perth on 18 July 1934. He attended John Forrest High School. After leaving school, he worked as a clerk, serving as assistant secretary of the Quairading Road Board and then as clerk of the Shire of West Kimberley.

At the 1968 state election, Ridge ran as the Liberal candidate for the seat of Kimberley, and defeated the sitting Labor member, John Rhatigan. He was the first non-Labor member for Kimberley for 44 years (since 1924).

After the Liberals' victory at the 1974 state election, Ridge was appointed Minister for Lands and Minister for Forests in the new ministry formed by Sir Charles Court. In June 1975, he was also made Minister for Tourism, replacing Bill Grayden. The ministry was reshuffled after the 1977 election, and Ridge was appointed Minister for Health and Minister for Community Welfare. Following another reshuffle in August 1978, he was instead made Minister for Housing, with Ray Young taking over his previous portfolio. Ridge lost his seat to Labor's Ernie Bridge at the 1980 election.

Ridge died in Perth on 6 March 2026, at the age of 91.

Parliament of Western Australia
Preceded by John Rhatigan	Member for Kimberley; 1968–1980	Succeeded by Ernie Bridge
Political offices
Preceded by David Evans	Minister for Lands; 1974–1977	Succeeded by June Craig
Preceded by David Evans	Minister for Forests; 1974–1977	Succeeded by June Craig
Preceded by Bill Grayden	Minister for Tourism; 1975–1977	Succeeded by Graham MacKinnon
Preceded by Norm Baxter	Minister for Health; 1977–1978	Succeeded by Ray Young
Preceded by Norm Baxter	Minister for Community Welfare; 1977–1978	Succeeded by Ray Young
Preceded by Ray O'Connor	Minister for Housing; 1978–1980	Succeeded by Andrew Mensaros
