= Ian Laurance =

Australian politician

Ian Laurance AM

Deputy Leader of the Liberal Party in Western Australia
- In office 25 November 1986 – 3 September 1987
- Leader: Barry MacKinnon
- Preceded by: Barry MacKinnon
- Succeeded by: Richard Court

Member of the Legislative Assembly of Western Australia
- In office 30 March 1974 – 3 September 1987
- Preceded by: Daniel Norton
- Succeeded by: Dudley Maslen
- Constituency: Gascoyne

Personal details
- Born: 30 April 1940 (age 86) Northam, Western Australia
- Party: Liberal
- Education: University of Western Australia

Ian James Laurance (born 30 April 1940) is a former Australian politician who was a Liberal Party member of the Legislative Assembly of Western Australia from 1974 to 1987, representing the seat of Gascoyne. He was a minister in the governments of Sir Charles Court and Ray O'Connor, and briefly served as deputy leader of the Liberal Party (from 1986 to 1987).

== Early life ==
Laurance was born in Northam, in the Wheatbelt, but was educated in Perth, attending Perth Boys' High School and John Curtin Senior High School. He went on to study at Graylands Teachers College and the University of Western Australia, subsequently working as a country schoolteacher. Laurance married Barbara Anne Berry (the daughter of George Berry) in 1964, with whom he had two children. He left teaching in 1970 to work for the Prudential Assurance Company, which brought him back to Perth.

== Politics ==
A longtime member of the Liberal Party, Laurance stood for parliament at the 1974 state election, winning the seat of Gascoyne. After the 1977 election, he was made a parliamentary secretary in the Court ministry. He was elevated to the ministry after the 1980 election, although he was an honorary minister rather than a substantive one. Following the resignation of Sir Charles Court in January 1982, Laurance was appointed Minister for Lands, Minister for Forests, and Minister for Conservation and Environment in the new ministry formed by Ray O'Connor. His time in cabinet was brief, however, as the Liberal government was defeated at the 1983 election. Laurance continued to serve in the Liberal shadow ministry until leaving parliament in September 1987, serving under three leaders of the opposition (Ray O'Connor, Bill Hassell, and Barry MacKinnon). He was elected deputy leader of the party in November 1986, when MacKinnon replaced Hassell as leader, but was in the position for less than a year before retiring.

== Later life ==
After leaving politics, Laurance initially worked as a company director. He later served as chairman of several state government agencies, including the Midland Redevelopment Authority (from 2000 to 2004), the Tourism Council of Western Australia (from 2006 to 2008), and the Perth Convention Bureau (from 2009 to 2016).

Parliament of Western Australia
Preceded by Daniel Norton	Member for Gascoyne; 1974–1987	Succeeded by Dudley Maslen
Preceded by David Wordsworth	Minister for Lands; 1982–1983	Succeeded by Ken McIver
Preceded by David Wordsworth	Minister for Forests; 1982–1983	Succeeded by Brian Burke
Preceded by Gordon Masters	Minister for Conservation and the Environment; 1982–1983	Succeeded by Ron Davies
