= Andrew Mensaros =

Hungarian-born Australian politician

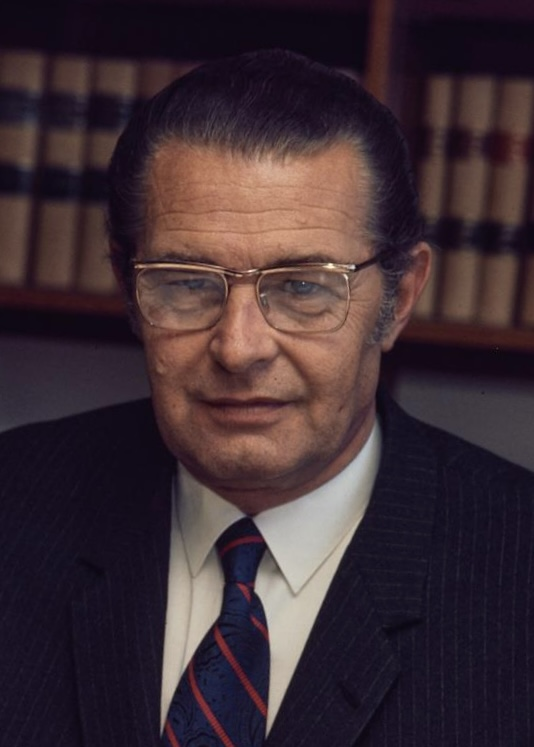
Mensaros in 1974

Andrew Mensaros (25 November 1921 – 29 May 1991) was a politician in Western Australia. Born in Hungary, and educated at the University of Budapest, a member of the Liberal Party, he served as a member of the Western Australian Legislative Assembly for the division of Floreat from 1968 until his death in 1991. He served as the Minister for Industrial Development, Mines and Fuel and Energy from 1974 to 1980, Minister for Works, Water Resources and Minister Assisting the Minister Coordinating Economic and Regional Development from 1980 to 1983. He was awarded the Queen's Silver Jubilee Medal in 1977.
