= Ray McPharlin =

Australian politician

Walter Raymond McPharlin (21 February 1916 – 13 July 1991) was the Country Party member for Mount Marshall in the Western Australian Legislative Assembly from 1967 to 1983.

He played football for East Fremantle from 1938 to 1939 and in 1941, and was elected to the Assembly in 1967. He led the Country Party from 1974 to 1975; after leading the party out of the Coalition with Charles Court's governing Liberal Party, he was deposed and the Coalition resumed. He joined the breakaway National Party in 1978, but rejoined the Country Party when it adopted the National Party name in 1982. McPharlin was defeated in 1983.
