= Results of the 1983 Western Australian state election (Legislative Council) =

Western Australian state election, 19 February 1983 Legislative Council
Enrolled voters	754,225				
Votes cast	671,102		Turnout	88.98%	+0.57%
Informal votes	24,962		Informal	3.72%	–0.66%
Summary of votes by party
Party	Primary votes	%	Swing	Seats won	Seats held
Labor	327,129	50.63%	+5.85%	7	13
Liberal	268,626	41.57%	–5.93%	9	19
National Country^{[2]}	20,553	3.18%	–0.64%	0	1
National^{[2]}	20,336	3.15%	–0.28%	1	1
Democrats	9,356	1.45%	+1.45%	0	0
Other parties	0	0.00%	–0.47%	0	0
Total	646,140			17	34
Two-party-preferred
Labor	341,236	52.81%	+5.17%		
Liberal/NCP	304,904	47.19%	–5.17%		

This is a list of electoral region results for the Western Australian Legislative Council in the 1983 Western Australian state election.

== Results by electoral province ==
=== Central ===
1983 Western Australian state election: Central Province
Party	Candidate	Votes	%	±%
Labor	Roy Little	6,770	28.3	
Liberal	Gordon Atkinson	6,246	26.1	
National Country	Arnold Byfield	5,749	24.0	
National	Eric Charlton	5,179	21.6	
Total formal votes		23,944	96.5	
Informal votes		857	87.0	
Turnout		24,801	90.1	
Two-party-preferred result
Liberal	Gordon Atkinson	15,707	65.6	
Labor	Roy Little	8,237	34.4	
Liberal gain from National Country		Swing		

=== Lower Central ===
1983 Western Australian state election: Lower Central Province
Party	Candidate	Votes	%	±%
Labor	John Bird	10,530	45.5	
Liberal	Bill Stretch	6,498	28.1	
National Country	Winifred Piesse	6,129	26.5	
Total formal votes		23,157	97.2	
Informal votes		673	2.8	
Turnout		23,830	91.4	
Two-party-preferred result
Liberal	Bill Stretch	12,005	51.8	
Labor	John Bird	11,152	48.2	
Liberal gain from National Country		Swing		

=== Lower North ===
1983 Western Australian state election: Lower North Province
Party	Candidate	Votes	%	±%
Liberal	Norman Moore	3,237	58.4	
Labor	Brian Wyatt	2,170	39.1	
Independent	Francesco Nesci	140	2.5	
Total formal votes		5,547	95.0	
Informal votes		293	5.0	
Turnout		5,840	81.1	
Liberal hold		Swing		

- Preferences were not distributed.

=== Lower West ===
1983 Western Australian state election: Lower West Province
Party	Candidate	Votes	%	±%
Liberal	Colin Bell	12,219	48.9	
Labor	Brian Coffey	10,737	42.9	
Democrats	Maxwell Barrington	2,053	8.2	
Total formal votes		25,009	97.1	
Informal votes		827	2.9	
Turnout		25,836	90.8	
Two-party-preferred result
Liberal	Colin Bell	13,384	53.5	
Labor	Brian Coffey	11,625	46.5	
Liberal hold		Swing		

=== Metropolitan ===
1983 Western Australian state election: Metropolitan Province
Party	Candidate	Votes	%	±%
Liberal	John Williams	40,364	56.4	
Labor	Graham Droppert	31,154	43.6	
Total formal votes		71,518	97.0	
Informal votes		2,175	3.0	
Turnout		73,693	86.2	
Liberal hold		Swing		

=== North ===
1983 Western Australian state election: North Province
Party	Candidate	Votes	%	±%
Labor	Tom Stephens	12,605	65.2	
Liberal	Peter Murray	6,721	34.8	
Total formal votes		19,326	95.7	
Informal votes		866	4.3	
Turnout		20,192	87.5	
Labor hold		Swing		

=== North Central Metropolitan ===
1983 Western Australian state election: North Central Metropolitan Province
Party	Candidate	Votes	%	±%
Labor	Sam Piantadosi	34,456	60.0	
Liberal	Michael Brazier	22,952	40.0	
Total formal votes		57,408	95.9	
Informal votes		2,425	4.1	
Turnout		59,833	87.8	
Labor hold		Swing		

=== North Metropolitan ===
1983 Western Australian state election: North Metropolitan Province
Party	Candidate	Votes	%	±%
Labor	Graham Edwards	31,146	51.5	
Liberal	Bob Pike	27,827	46.0	
Democrats	Bryan Lobascher	1,494	2.5	
Total formal votes		60,467	96.5	
Informal votes		2,168	3.5	
Turnout		62,635	88.7	
Labor gain from Liberal		Swing		

- Preferences were not distributed.

=== North-East Metropolitan ===
1983 Western Australian state election: North-East Metropolitan Province
Party	Candidate	Votes	%	±%
Labor	Fred McKenzie	45,425	63.5	
Liberal	Douglas Ismail	23,373	32.7	
Democrats	Kevin Trent	2,744	3.8	
Total formal votes		71,542	93.9	
Informal votes		4,655	6.1	
Turnout		76,197	88.7	
Labor hold		Swing		

- Preferences were not distributed.

=== South ===
1983 Western Australian state election: South Province
Party	Candidate	Votes	%	±%
Liberal	David Wordsworth	8,290	36.1	
Labor	Ron Leeson	6,249	27.2	
National Country	Leonard Newing	4,328	18.9	
National	Leslie Stephens	4,096	17.8	
Total formal votes		22,963	96.7	
Informal votes		784	3.3	
Turnout		23,747	90.3	
Two-party-preferred result
Liberal	David Wordsworth	15,306	66.7	
Labor	Ron Leeson	7,657	33.3	
Liberal hold		Swing		

=== South Central Metropolitan ===
1983 Western Australian state election: South Central Metropolitan Province
Party	Candidate	Votes	%	±%
Liberal	Clive Griffiths	27,995	49.9	
Labor	Sydney Hickman	25,092	44.7	
Democrats	Richard Jeffreys	3,065	5.5	
Total formal votes		56,152	96.6	
Informal votes		1,950	4.4	
Turnout		58,102	88.3	
Two-party-preferred result
Liberal	Clive Griffiths	29,936	53.3	
Labor	Sydney Hickman	26,216	46.7	
Liberal hold		Swing		

=== South East ===
1983 Western Australian state election: South-East Province
Party	Candidate	Votes	%	±%
Labor	Mark Nevill	10,141	60.0	
Liberal	Stanley Brown	6,775	40.0	
Total formal votes		16,916	96.5	
Informal votes		615	3.5	
Turnout		17,531	88.5	
Labor hold		Swing		

=== South East Metropolitan ===
1983 Western Australian state election: South-East Metropolitan Province
Party	Candidate	Votes	%	±%
Labor	Kay Hallahan	35,790	59.6	
Liberal	Rodney Boland	24,255	40.4	
Total formal votes		60,045	96.9	
Informal votes		1,910	3.1	
Turnout		61,955	89.0	
Labor hold		Swing		

=== South Metropolitan ===
1983 Western Australian state election: South Metropolitan Province
Party	Candidate	Votes	%	±%
Labor	Des Dans	41,791	69.7	
Liberal	Colin Cashman	18,132	30.3	
Total formal votes		59,923	95.9	
Informal votes		2,549	4.1	
Turnout		62,472	92.4	
Labor hold		Swing		

=== South West ===
1983 Western Australian state election: South West
Party	Candidate	Votes	%	±%
Liberal	Vic Ferry	12,603	50.9	
Labor	Doug Wenn	12,173	49.1	
Total formal votes		24,776	97.0	
Informal votes		773	3.0	
Turnout		25,549	91.7	
Liberal hold		Swing		

=== Upper West ===
1983 Western Australian state election: Upper West Province
Party	Candidate	Votes	%	±%
National	Tom McNeil	11,061	46.3	
Liberal	Peter Browne	8,495	35.5	
National Country	Gordon Garratt	4,347	18.2	
Total formal votes		23,903	96.8	
Informal votes		795	3.2	
Turnout		24,698	89.4	
National hold		Swing		

=== West ===
1983 Western Australian state election: West Province
Party	Candidate	Votes	%	±%
Liberal	Neil Oliver	12,644	53.7	
Labor	Nadeem Ramsay	10,900	46.3	
Total formal votes		23,544	97.3	
Informal votes		647	2.7	
Turnout		24,191	89.2	
Liberal hold		Swing		

== See also ==
- Results of the Western Australian state election, 1983 (Legislative Assembly)
- 1983 Western Australian state election
- Candidates of the Western Australian state election, 1983
- Members of the Western Australian Legislative Council, 1983–1986
