= Candidates of the 1983 Western Australian state election =

The 1983 Western Australian state election was held on 19 February 1983.

== Retiring Members ==
=== Liberal ===
- Brian Sodeman MLA (Pilbara)
- Neil McNeill MLC (Lower West)

=== National Country ===
- Norm Baxter MLC (Central)

== Legislative Assembly ==
Sitting members are shown in bold text. Successful candidates are highlighted in the relevant colour. Where there is possible confusion, an asterisk (*) is also used.

Electorate	Held by	Labor candidate	Coalition candidate	Other candidates
Albany	Liberal	Josephine Lynch	Darrall Simpson (NCP); **Leon Watt*** (Lib)	John Chamberlain (Dem)
Armadale	Labor	**Bob Pearce**	Douglas Cable (Lib)	
Ascot	Labor	**Mal Bryce**	Richard Dalgleish (Lib)	
Avon	Labor	**Ken McIver**	Thomas Richards (Lib); Max Trenorden (NCP)	
Balcatta	Labor	**Ron Bertram**	Vincenzo Allessandrino (Lib)	
Balga	Labor	**Brian Burke**	Peter Nolan (Lib)	
Bunbury	Liberal	Phil Smith	**John Sibson** (Lib)	Donald Stewart (Dem)
Canning	Labor	**Tom Bateman**	John Nagle (Lib)	
Clontarf	Liberal	David Dale	**Tony Williams** (Lib)	
Cockburn	Labor	**Don Taylor**	Gregory Bowler (Lib)	
Collie	Labor	**Tom Jones**	Allen Mountford (NCP)	
Cottesloe	Liberal	Leslie Heinrich	**Bill Hassell** (Lib)	Alfred Bussell (Ind); Marjorie McKercher (Dem)
Dale	Liberal	Philip Vincent	**Cyril Rushton** (Lib)	Joan Farrelly (Dem)
Darling Range	Liberal	Reginald Howard-Smith	**George Spriggs** (Lib)	
East Melville	Liberal	Carmen Lawrence	**Anthony Trethowan** (Lib)	Shirley de la Hunty (Dem)
Esperance-Dundas	Labor	**Julian Grill**	**Geoff Grewar** (Lib); Robert Russell (NCP)	
Floreat	Liberal	Peter Keating	**Andrew Mensaros** (Lib)	Robert Ward (Ind)
Fremantle	Labor	**David Parker**	Joseph Faliti (Lib)	Timothy Peach (SLL)
Gascoyne	Liberal	John Cunningham	**Ian Laurance** (Lib)	
Geraldton	Liberal	**Jeff Carr**	Harold Driscoll (Lib)	
Gosnells	Labor	Yvonne Henderson	Michael Mitchell (Lib)	Gordon Stapp (Ind)
Greenough	Liberal	Timothy Gamage	**Reg Tubby** (Lib)	
Helena	Labor	**Gordon Hill**	Marianne McCall (Lib)	
Joondalup	Labor	Jackie Watkins	**Mick Nanovich** (Lib)	
Kalamunda	Liberal	Theraza Glindon	**Ian Thompson** (Lib)	Phillip Franzone (Dem)
Kalgoorlie	Labor	**Ian Taylor**	Ross Lightfoot (Lib)	Maxine Cable (Ind)
Karrinyup	Liberal	Richard Pitts	**Jim Clarko** (Lib)	Jean Jenkins (Dem)
Katanning-Roe	NCP	Marilyn Elson	**Dick Old** (NCP)	
Kimberley	Labor	**Ernie Bridge**	Robert Whitton (Lib)	
Mandurah	Liberal	John Read	**Richard Shalders** (Lib)	Leonard Attwill (Ind)
Maylands	Labor	**John Harman**	Wouterina Klein (Lib)	
Melville	Labor	**Barry Hodge**	Judith Gleeson (Lib)	
Merredin	National		Richard Cooper (Lib); Harold Lang (NCP)	**Hendy Cowan*** (Nat); Zoran Panzich (Ind)
Mitchell	Labor	David Smith	**June Craig** (Lib)	
Moore	NCP	Michael O'Rourke	**Bert Crane*** (NCP); Ernest Twine (Lib)	
Morley-Swan	Labor	**Arthur Tonkin**	Ramsay Bogunovich (Lib)	James Connolly (Ind)
Mount Lawley	Liberal	Desmond Hoffman	**Ray O'Connor** (Lib)	Cedric Beidatsch (CPA)
Mount Marshall	National	Robert Couzens	Bill McNee* (Lib); **Ray McPharlin** (NCP)	Ronald Aitkenhead (Nat)
Mundaring	Liberal	Gavan Troy	**Tom Herzfeld** (Lib)	Bryan Scott-Courtland (Dem)
Murchison-Eyre	Liberal	Frank Donovan	**Peter Coyne** (Lib)	Kevin Seivwright (Ind)
Murdoch	Liberal	Eric Ripper	**Barry MacKinnon** (Lib)	James Owen (Ind)
Murray-Wellington	Liberal	James Hersey	John Bradshaw (Lib)	Marius Loeffler (Ind)
Narrogin	NCP		**Peter Jones** (NCP)	
Nedlands	Liberal	Saliba Sassine	**Richard Court** (Lib)	
Nollamara	Labor	**Keith Wilson**	Gregory Wilson (Lib)	
Perth	Labor	**Terry Burke**	Peter Bogue (Lib)	
Pilbara	Liberal	Pam Buchanan	David Penny (Lib)	Vincent Cooper (Ind)
Rockingham	Labor	**Mike Barnett**	Maureen Mileham (Lib)	
Scarborough	Liberal	Graham Burkett	**Ray Young** (Lib)	
South Perth	Liberal	Sten Jakobsen	**Bill Grayden** (Lib)	
Stirling	National		Thomas Buxton (NCP); Peter Skinner (Lib)	**Matt Stephens** (Nat)
Subiaco	Liberal	William Bartholomaeus	**Tom Dadour** (Lib)	
Vasse	Liberal	Dane Carroll	**Barry Blaikie** (Lib)	Stewart Melville (Ind)
Victoria Park	Labor	**Ron Davies**	Pauline Iles (Lib)	
Warren	Labor	**David Evans**	Noel Klopper (NCP); Ross Young (Lib)	Noel Duggan (Ind)
Welshpool	Labor	**Colin Jamieson**	Robert Gray (Lib)	
Whitford	Liberal	Pam Beggs	Darryll Retallack (Lib)	

== Legislative Council ==
Sitting members are shown in bold text. Successful candidates are highlighted in the relevant colour. Where there is possible confusion, an asterisk (*) is also used.

Province	Held by	Labor candidate	Coalition candidate	Other candidates
Central	NCP	Roy Little	Gordon Atkinson* (Lib); Arnold Byfield (NCP)	Eric Charlton (Nat)
Lower Central	NCP	John Bird	**Winifred Piesse** (NCP); Bill Stretch* (Lib)	
Lower North	Liberal	Brian Wyatt	**Norman Moore** (Lib)	Frank Nesci (Ind)
Lower West	Liberal	Brian Coffey	Colin Bell (Lib)	Maxwell Barrington (Dem)
Metropolitan	Liberal	Graham Droppert	**John Williams** (Lib)	
North	Labor	**Tom Stephens**	Peter Murray (Lib)	
North Central Metropolitan	Labor	Sam Piantadosi	Michael Brazier (Lib)	
North Metropolitan	Liberal	Graham Edwards	**Bob Pike** (Lib)	Bryan Lobascher (Dem)
North-East Metropolitan	Labor	**Fred McKenzie**	Douglas Ismail (Lib)	Kevin Trent (Dem)
South	Liberal	**Ron Leeson**	Leonard Newing (NCP); **David Wordsworth*** (Lib)	Leslie Stephens (Nat)
South Central Metropolitan	Liberal	Sydney Hickman	**Clive Griffiths** (Lib)	Richard Jeffreys (Dem)
South-East	Labor	Mark Nevill	Stanley Brown (Lib)	
South-East Metropolitan	Labor	Kay Hallahan	Rodney Boland (Lib)	
South Metropolitan	Labor	**Des Dans**	Colin Cashman (Lib)	
South West	Liberal	Doug Wenn	**Vic Ferry** (Lib)	
Upper West	National		Peter Browne (Lib); Gordon Garratt (NCP)	**Tom McNeil** (Nat)
West	Liberal	Nadeem Ramsay	**Neil Oliver** (Lib)	

== See also ==
- Members of the Western Australian Legislative Assembly, 1980–1983
- Members of the Western Australian Legislative Assembly, 1983–1986
- Members of the Western Australian Legislative Council, 1980–1983
- Members of the Western Australian Legislative Council, 1983–1986
- 1983 Western Australian state election
