= Members of the Western Australian Legislative Council, 1986–1989 =

This is a list of members of the Western Australian Legislative Council from 22 May 1986 to 21 May 1989. The chamber had 34 seats made up of 17 provinces each electing two members, on a system of rotation whereby one-half of the members would retire at each triennial election.

During the term, the Acts Amendment (Electoral Reform) Act 1987 (No.40 of 1987) was passed, which abolished all provinces and created six new multi-member electoral regions to be filled with a system of proportional representation. Terms were increased to four years, but all members retired at each election in contrast with previous practice. There was no transition period—all present members would retire on 21 May 1989, and the new arrangement would take effect the following day based on the results of the 4 February 1989 election.

Name	Party	Province	Years in office
Colin Bell	Liberal	Lower West	1983–1989
Joe Berinson	Labor	North Central Metropolitan	1980–1993
James Brown	Labor	South-East	1980–1992
Tom Butler	Labor	North-East Metropolitan	1986–1995
John Caldwell	National	South	1986–1993
Eric Charlton	National	Central	1984–1998
Des Dans	Labor	South Metropolitan	1971–1989
Graham Edwards	Labor	North Metropolitan	1983–1997
Max Evans	Liberal	Metropolitan	1986–2001
Vic Ferry^{[2]}	Liberal	South-West	1965–1987
Harry Gayfer	National	Central	1974–1989
Clive Griffiths	Liberal	South Central Metropolitan	1965–1997
John Halden	Labor	North Metropolitan	1986–2000
Kay Hallahan	Labor	South-East Metropolitan	1983–1993
Tom Helm	Labor	North	1986–2001
Bob Hetherington	Labor	South-East Metropolitan	1977–1989
Barry House^{[2]}	Liberal	South-West	1987–2017
Beryl Jones	Labor	Lower West	1986–1993
Garry Kelly	Labor	South Metropolitan	1982–1993
Sandy Lewis	Liberal/Ind. Lib.^{[1]}	Lower Central	1974–1989
Phil Lockyer	Liberal	Lower North	1980–1997
Margaret McAleer	Liberal	Upper West	1974–1993
Fred McKenzie	Labor	North-East Metropolitan	1977–1993
Tom McNeil	National	Upper West	1977–1989
Gordon Masters	Liberal	West	1974–1989
Norman Moore	Liberal	Lower North	1977–2013
Mark Nevill	Labor	South-East	1983–2001
Neil Oliver	Liberal	West	1977–1989
Phillip Pendal	Liberal	South Central Metropolitan	1980–1993
Sam Piantadosi	Labor	North Central Metropolitan	1983–1996
Tom Stephens	Labor	North	1982–2004
Bill Stretch	Liberal	Lower Central	1983–2005
Doug Wenn	Labor	South West	1986–1997
John Williams	Liberal	Metropolitan	1971–1989
David Wordsworth	Liberal	South	1971–1993

== Notes ==
^{1} Sandy Lewis resigned from the Liberal Party in March 1986 following the decision by the Shadow Ministry to appoint standing committee chairmen from amongst its own numbers. He rejoined the party in October 1986, but left again after failing to be preselected in mid-1988.
^{2} On 24 July 1987, South-West Province Liberal MLC Vic Ferry resigned. Liberal candidate Barry House won the resulting by-election on 24 October 1987.

== Sources ==
- Black, David (1991). Legislative Council of Western Australia : membership register, electoral law and statistics, 1890-1989. Perth: Parliamentary History Project. ISBN 0-7309-3641-4.
- Hughes, Colin A.; Aitkin, Don (1986). Voting for the Australian State Upper Houses, 1890-1984. Canberra: Australian National University. ISBN 0-909779-18-X.
- Black, David; Bolton, Geoffrey (2001b). Biographical Register of Members of the Parliament of Western Australia. Vol. Two: 1930-1990 (Revised ed.). Parliament House: Parliament of Western Australia. ISBN 0731697839.
