= Members of the Western Australian Legislative Council, 1983–1986 =

This is a list of members of the Western Australian Legislative Council from 22 May 1983 to 21 May 1986. The chamber had 34 seats made up of 17 provinces each electing two members, on a system of rotation whereby one-half of the members would retire at each triennial election.

Name	Party	Province	Term expires	Years in office
Gordon Atkinson^{[1]}	Liberal	Central	1989	1983–1984
Colin Bell	Liberal	Lower West	1989	1983–1989
Joe Berinson	Labor	North Central Metropolitan	1986	1980–1993
James Brown	Labor	South-East	1986	1980–1992
Eric Charlton^{[1]}	National/NP	Central	1989	1984–1998
Des Dans	Labor	South Metropolitan	1989	1971–1989
Peter Dowding	Labor	North	1986	1980–1986
Graham Edwards	Labor	North Metropolitan	1989	1983–1997
Lyla Elliott	Labor	North-East Metropolitan	1986	1971–1986
Vic Ferry	Liberal	South-West	1989	1965–1987
Harry Gayfer	National/NCP	Central	1986	1974–1989
Clive Griffiths	Liberal	South Central Metropolitan	1989	1965–1997
Kay Hallahan	Labor	South-East Metropolitan	1989	1983–1993
Bob Hetherington	Labor	South-East Metropolitan	1986	1977–1989
Garry Kelly	Labor	South Metropolitan	1986	1982–1993
Thomas Knight	Liberal	South	1986	1974–1986
Sandy Lewis	Liberal	Lower Central	1986	1974–1989
Phil Lockyer	Liberal	Lower North	1986	1980–1997
Margaret McAleer	Liberal	Upper West	1986	1974–1993
Fred McKenzie	Labor	North-East Metropolitan	1989	1977–1993
Graham MacKinnon	Liberal	South West	1986	1956–1986
Tom McNeil	National/NP	Upper West	1989	1977–1989
Gordon Masters	Liberal	West	1986	1974–1989
Ian Medcalf	Liberal	Metropolitan	1986	1968–1986
Norman Moore	Liberal	Lower North	1989	1977–2013
Mark Nevill	Labor	South-East	1989	1983–2001
Neil Oliver	Liberal	West	1989	1977–1989
Phillip Pendal	Liberal	South Central Metropolitan	1986	1980–1993
Sam Piantadosi	Labor	North Central Metropolitan	1989	1983–1996
Ian Pratt	Liberal	Lower West	1986	1974–1986
Tom Stephens	Labor	North	1989	1982–2004
Bill Stretch	Liberal	Lower Central	1989	1983–2005
Peter Wells	Liberal	North Metropolitan	1986	1980–1986
John Williams	Liberal	Metropolitan	1989	1971–1989
David Wordsworth	Liberal	South	1989	1971–1993

== Notes ==
^{1} On 4 August 1984, Central Province Liberal MLC Gordon Atkinson died. National candidate Eric Charlton won the resulting by-election on 17 November 1984.

== Sources ==
- Black, David (1991). Legislative Council of Western Australia : membership register, electoral law and statistics, 1890-1989. Perth: Parliamentary History Project. ISBN 0-7309-3641-4.
- Hughes, Colin A.; Aitkin, Don (1986). Voting for the Australian State Upper Houses, 1890-1984. Canberra: Australian National University. ISBN 0-909779-18-X.
- Black, David; Bolton, Geoffrey (2001b). Biographical Register of Members of the Parliament of Western Australia. Vol. Two: 1930-1990 (Revised ed.). Parliament House: Parliament of Western Australia. ISBN 0731697839.
