= Members of the Western Australian Legislative Council, 1980–1983 =

This is a list of members of the Western Australian Legislative Council from 22 May 1980 to 21 May 1983. The chamber had 32 seats made up of 16 provinces each electing two members, on a system of rotation whereby one-half of the members would retire at each triennial election.

Name	Party	Province	Term expires	Years in office
Norm Baxter	National/NCP	Central	1983	1950–1958; 1960–1983
Joe Berinson	Labor	North-East Metropolitan	1986	1980–1993
James Brown	Labor	South-East	1986	1980–1992
Des Dans	Labor	South Metropolitan	1983	1971–1989
Peter Dowding	Labor	North	1986	1980–1986
Lyla Elliott	Labor	North-East Metropolitan	1983	1971–1986
Vic Ferry	Liberal	South-West	1983	1965–1987
Harry Gayfer	National/NCP	Central	1986	1974–1989
Clive Griffiths	Liberal	South-East Metropolitan	1983	1965–1997
Bob Hetherington	Labor	East Metropolitan	1986	1977–1989
Garry Kelly^{[1]}	Labor	South Metropolitan	1986	1982–1993
Thomas Knight	Liberal	South	1986	1974–1986
Ron Leeson	Labor	South-East	1983	1971–1983
Sandy Lewis	Liberal	Lower Central	1986	1974–1989
Phil Lockyer	Liberal	Lower North	1986	1980–1997
Margaret McAleer	Liberal	Upper West	1986	1974–1993
Fred McKenzie	Labor	East Metropolitan	1983	1977–1993
Graham MacKinnon	Liberal	South West	1986	1956–1986
Tom McNeil	National/NP	Upper West	1983	1977–1989
Neil McNeill	Liberal	Lower West	1983	1965–1983
Gordon Masters	Liberal	West	1986	1974–1989
Ian Medcalf	Liberal	Metropolitan	1986	1968–1986
Norman Moore	Liberal	Lower North	1983	1977–2013
Neil Oliver	Liberal	West	1983	1977–1989
Howard Olney^{[1]}	Labor	South Metropolitan	1986	1980–1981
Phillip Pendal	Liberal	South-East Metropolitan	1986	1980–1993
Winifred Piesse	National/NCP	Lower Central	1983	1977–1983
Bob Pike	Liberal	North Metropolitan	1983	1977–1983; 1989–1994
Ian Pratt	Liberal	Lower West	1986	1974–1986
Tom Stephens^{[2]}	Labor	North	1983	1982–2004
Peter Wells	Liberal	North Metropolitan	1986	1980–1986
John Williams	Liberal	Metropolitan	1983	1971–1989
Bill Withers^{[2]}	Liberal/Independent	North	1983	1971–1982
David Wordsworth	Liberal	South	1983	1971–1993

== Notes ==
^{1} On 16 December 1981, South Metropolitan Province Labor MLC Howard Olney resigned in order to be appointed to the Supreme Court of Western Australia. Labor candidate Garry Kelly won the resulting by-election on 13 March 1982.
^{2} On 21 May 1982, North Province MLC Bill Withers, who had been elected as a Liberal but had resigned from the party in May 1981, resigned. Labor candidate Tom Stephens won the resulting by-election on 31 July 1982.

== Sources ==
- Black, David (1991). Legislative Council of Western Australia : membership register, electoral law and statistics, 1890-1989. Perth: Parliamentary History Project. ISBN 0-7309-3641-4.
- Hughes, Colin A.; Aitkin, Don (1986). Voting for the Australian State Upper Houses, 1890-1984. Canberra: Australian National University. ISBN 0-909779-18-X.
- Black, David (April 1982). "Australian Political Chronicle: July–December 1981". Australian Journal of Politics and History. 28 (1): 115–116. ISSN 0004-9522.
- Black, David; Bolton, Geoffrey (2001b). Biographical Register of Members of the Parliament of Western Australia. Vol. Two: 1930-1990 (Revised ed.). Parliament House: Parliament of Western Australia. ISBN 0731697839.
