= Candidates of the 1986 Western Australian state election =

The 1986 Western Australian state election was held on 8 February 1986.

== Retiring Members ==
=== Labor ===
- John Harman MLA (Maylands)
- Colin Jamieson MLA (Welshpool)
- Lyla Elliott MLC (North-East Metropolitan)

=== Liberal ===
- Peter Coyne MLA (Murchison-Eyre)
- Anthony Trethowan MLA (East Melville)
- Graham MacKinnon MLC (South-West)
- Ian Medcalf MLC (Metropolitan)

=== Independent ===
- Tom Dadour MLA (Subiaco) – elected as Liberal

== Legislative Assembly ==
Sitting members are shown in bold text. Successful candidates are highlighted in the relevant colour. Where there is possible confusion, an asterisk (*) is also used.

Electorate	Held by	Labor candidate	Liberal candidate	National candidate	Other candidates
Albany	Liberal	Josephine Lynch	**Leon Watt**		
Armadale	Labor	**Bob Pearce**	Phillip Giblett		
Ascot	Labor	**Mal Bryce**	Robert van Straalen		
Avon	Labor	**Ken McIver**	Michael Cahill	Max Trenorden	
Balcatta	Labor	**Ron Bertram**	Vincenzo Alessandrino		
Balga	Labor	**Brian Burke**	John Gordon		William Nind (Ind)
Bunbury	Labor	**Phil Smith**	John Sibson		Alfred Bussell (Ind)
Canning	Labor	**Judyth Watson**	Elkin Conway		
Clontarf	Liberal	Kon Vatskalis	**Tony Williams**		
Cockburn	Labor	**Clive Hughes**	Mark Iriks		
Collie	Labor	**Tom Jones**	John Davison	Hilda Turnbull	Roy Bussell (Ind)
Cottesloe	Liberal	John Noonan	**Bill Hassell**		
Dale	Liberal	Philip Vincent	**Cyril Rushton**		Mark Beadle (Dem)
Darling Range	Liberal	William McAtee	**George Spriggs**		Richard Jeffreys (Dem)
East Melville	Liberal	Gary Low	Richard Lewis		
Esperance-Dundas	Labor	**Julian Grill**	Marie Wordsworth		
Floreat	Liberal	Ian Bacon	**Andrew Mensaros**		
Fremantle	Labor	**David Parker**	Aileen Atkins		Frank Noakes (SWP); Wendy Schulze (Ind)
Gascoyne	Liberal	Kevin Leahy	**Ian Laurance**		
Geraldton	Labor	**Jeff Carr**	Marjorie Tubby		
Gosnells	Labor	**Yvonne Henderson**	Michael Smith		
Greenough	Liberal	David Ridley	**Reg Tubby**		
Helena	Labor	**Gordon Hill**	Beryl Joines		
Joondalup	Labor	**Jackie Watkins**	Mick Nanovich		Harry Frochter (Dem); Vida Wright (Ind)
Kalamunda	Liberal	Jacqueline Jeffreys	**Ian Thompson**		
Kalgoorlie	Labor	**Ian Taylor**			Stephanie Farrell (Ind)
Karrinyup	Liberal	Ian Noack	**Jim Clarko**		
Katanning-Roe	National	Jonathan Davies	**Dick Old**	Monty House	
Kimberley	Labor	**Ernie Bridge**	William Shepherd		
Mandurah	Labor	**John Read**	Wayne McRostie		George Counsel (Dem)
Maylands	Labor	Peter Dowding	Michael MacAulay		Peter Hayes (Dem); David MacLiver (Ind); Michael Pal (Ind); Clive Turner (Ind)
Melville	Labor	**Barry Hodge**	Eric Zumbo		
Merredin	National	Salvatore Musca	Bruce Harvey	**Hendy Cowan**	
Mitchell	Labor	**David Smith**	Trevor Slater		
Moore	National	Nicholas Agocs	**Bert Crane**	Frank Creagh	
Morley-Swan	Labor	**Arthur Tonkin**	Christine Fisher		
Mount Lawley	Liberal	Kenneth Withers	**George Cash**		
Mount Marshall	Liberal	Robert Couzens	**Bill McNee**	Mort Schell	
Mundaring	Labor	**Gavan Troy**	Steven Hart		Rodney Gibbs (Dem)
Murchison-Eyre	Liberal	Christopher Sweeney	Ross Lightfoot		Cyril Barnes (Ind); Neil Dimer (Ind); John Ford (Ind); Aubrey Lynch (Ind)
Murdoch	Liberal	Mark Johnson	**Barry MacKinnon**		Orland Bertocchi (Ind); Anthony Greatwood (Ind)
Murray-Wellington	Liberal	Terrence Caraher	**John Bradshaw**		
Narrogin	National	Wayne White	**Peter Jones**	Cambell Nalder	
Nedlands	Liberal	Ross Williamson	**Richard Court**		
Nollamara	Labor	**Keith Wilson**	Wouterina Klein		
Perth	Labor	**Terry Burke**	Peter Evans		Michael Crossing (Ind)
Pilbara	Labor	**Pam Buchanan**	Johannes Van Uden		
Rockingham	Labor	**Mike Barnett**	Robert Douglas		Patricia Todd (Ind)
Scarborough	Labor	**Graham Burkett**	Frances Grierson		Barbara Churchward (Ind); Charles Hall (Dem)
South Perth	Liberal	Jennifer McNae	**Bill Grayden**		
Stirling	National		Peter Skinner	**Matt Stephens**	
Subiaco	Liberal	Carmen Lawrence	Ross McLean		Geoff Stuart (Ind)
Vasse	Liberal	Laurie Watson	**Barry Blaikie**		
Victoria Park	Labor	**Ron Davies**	Diane Airey		
Warren	Labor	**David Evans**	Paul Omodei		Charles Parke (Ind)
Welshpool	Labor	Bill Thomas	Stephen Gardiner		
Whitford	Labor	**Pam Beggs**	Kenneth Schulz		Graeme Major (Dem)

== Legislative Council ==
Sitting members are shown in bold text. Successful candidates are highlighted in the relevant colour. Where there is possible confusion, an asterisk (*) is also used.

Province	Held by	Labor candidate	Liberal candidate	National candidate	Democrats candidate	Other candidates
Central	National	Kim Chance	John Panizza	**Harry Gayfer**		
Lower Central	Liberal	John Bird	**Sandy Lewis**	Eric Blight	Violet Fussell	
Lower North	Liberal	Lesley-Ann Hoare	**Phil Lockyer**		Kenneth Winder	Frank Nesci (Ind)
Lower West	Liberal	Beryl Jones	**Ian Pratt**		Shirley de la Hunty	
Metropolitan	Liberal		Max Evans		Jack Evans	Patrick Finn (Ind Lab)
North	Labor	Frank Butler; Tom Helm*			Helen Aquilina	
North Central Metropolitan	Labor	**Joe Berinson**	Frank Hansford-Miller		Jean Foster	
North Metropolitan	Liberal	John Halden	**Peter Wells**		Jean Jenkins	
North-East Metropolitan	Labor	Tom Butler	Robert Nicholson		Fred Long	
South	Liberal	Albert Newman	**Thomas Knight**	John Caldwell		
South Central Metropolitan	Liberal	John Bissett	**Phillip Pendal**		Alan Needham	
South-East	Labor	**Jim Brown**	Douglas Krepp			
South Metropolitan	Labor	**Garry Kelly**	Alan Harste			
South-East Metropolitan	Labor	**Bob Hetherington**	Jonathan Shack		Douglas Gettingby	
South-West	Liberal	Doug Wenn	James Dwyer		Janice Bowen	
Upper West	Liberal		**Margaret McAleer**	Sue Shields		
West	Liberal	Nadeem Ramsay	**Gordon Masters**		Kenneth Goodman	

== See also ==
- Members of the Western Australian Legislative Assembly, 1983–1986
- Members of the Western Australian Legislative Assembly, 1986–1989
- Members of the Western Australian Legislative Council, 1983–1986
- Members of the Western Australian Legislative Council, 1986–1989
- 1986 Western Australian state election
