= Electoral regions of Western Australia =

The historical six regions of the Western Australian Legislative Council

The Western Australian Legislative Council was elected from six multi-member electoral regions, which are in turn composed of electoral districts which are used to elect the Legislative Assembly. The current number of electoral regions was established on 22 May 1989. Initially, the South West and Northern Metropolitan regions returned seven members to the Legislative Council, while the other regions each returned five members. This arrangement was changed to have each region return six members for the 2008 Western Australian election, increasing the total number of members from 34 to 36. Before 1989 electoral divisions for the Legislative Council were known as electoral provinces.

The boundaries of electoral regions that applied to the 2021 Western Australian state general election were finalised in November 2019 by the Electoral Distribution Commissioners.

On 16 September 2021, the McGowan Labor Government introduced the Constitutional and Electoral Legislation Amendment (Electoral Equality) Bill 2021 to abolish the electoral regions and replace them with a system whereby the whole state functions as a single "whole of state" electorate that will now elect 37 members of the Legislative Council. The Bill was passed by Parliament on 17 November 2021 and received the Governor's assent on 24 November 2021. Transitional provisions in the Constitutional and Electoral Legislation Amendment (Electoral Equality) Act 2021 provide that the former provisions in the Electoral Act 1907 continue to apply in respect of a Council vacancy prior to 21 May 2025 and in respect of representation of members elected prior to the amending provisions. This means that by-elections for the Legislative Assembly and any vacancy in relation to a member of the Legislative Council will still be based on the 2019 redistribution, until the 2025 state general election.

== Electoral regions ==
The electoral regions structure was created in 1989. Initially, the South West and Northern Metropolitan regions returned seven members to the Legislative Council, while the other regions each returned five members. This arrangement was changed to have each region return six members for the 2008 Western Australian election. A redistribution of boundaries of and divisions in regions took place in 2015 and in 2019. The next redistribution will commence in March 2023 and is likely to be finalised by November of that year.

Name	Est.	Area (2017)	Electors (2017)	№ Legislative Assembly districts (2017)	Current seat distribution (2021)
Agricultural	1989	281,264 km^{2} (108,597 sq mi)	101,229	4	
East Metropolitan	1989	3,697 km^{2} (1,427 sq mi)*	362,932	14	
Mining and Pastoral	1989	2,200,083 km^{2} (849,457 sq mi)	96,894	4	
North Metropolitan	1989	929 km^{2} (359 sq mi)*	362,608	14	
South Metropolitan	1989	754 km^{2} (291 sq mi)*	377,634	15	
South West	1989	44,870 km^{2} (17,320 sq mi)	205,270	8	
Total			1,506,567	59	

Note: The metropolitan regions (marked *) use the 2013 area information.

The structure of the regions prior to the 2015 redistribution was as follows:

Name	Est.	Area (2013)	№ Legislative Assembly districts (2013)	Distribution of seats (2013)
Agricultural	1989	200,091 km^{2} (77,256 sq mi)	4	
East Metropolitan	1989	3,697 km^{2} (1,427 sq mi)	14	
Mining and Pastoral	1989	2,280,730 km^{2} (880,590 sq mi)	5	
North Metropolitan	1989	929 km^{2} (359 sq mi)	14	
South Metropolitan	1989	754 km^{2} (291 sq mi)	14	
South West	1989	41,008 km^{2} (15,833 sq mi)	8	
Total			59	

Legend:

Labor	Liberal	National	Greens	Shooters and Fishers

== Former electoral provinces ==
Before 1989 electoral divisions for the Legislative Council were known as electoral provinces. The Constitution Acts Amendment Act (No.2) 1963, effective from the 1965 state election, abolished the ten existing three-member provinces, replacing them with 15 two-member provinces. One new province was added at the 1977 state election. Some of the new provinces bore the same names as the previous provinces.

=== Metropolitan ===
Name	Est.	Abolished	№ of members	Notes
East Metropolitan	1977	1983	2	
Metropolitan	1894	1989	3 (1894–1965); 2 (1965–89)	
Suburban known as Metropolitan-Suburban Province from 1900–50.	1900	1965	3	
North Central Metropolitan	1983	1989	2	
North-East Metropolitan	1965	1989	2	
North Metropolitan	1965	1989	2	
South Central Metropolitan	1983	1989	2	
South-East Metropolitan	1965	1989	2	
South Metropolitan	1965	1989	2	

=== Rural ===
- Central Province
- Lower Central Province
- Lower North Province
- Lower West Province
- North Province
- South-East Province
- South Province
- South-West Province
- Upper West Province
- West Province

== See also ==
- Electoral districts of Western Australia
- Regions of Western Australia
