= Results of the 1983 Western Australian state election (Legislative Assembly) =

Western Australian state election, 19 February 1983 Legislative Assembly << 1980–1986 >>
| Enrolled voters | 744,986^{[1]} | | | | |
| Votes cast | 663,153 | | Turnout | 87.93% | +2.66% |
| Informal votes | 18,799 | | Informal | 2.83% | –0.69% |
Summary of votes by party
| Party | Primary votes | % | Swing | Seats | Change |
| Labor | 342,536 | 53.16% | +7.21% | 32 | + 9 |
| Liberal | 256,846 | 39.86% | –3.89% | 20 | – 6 |
| National Country^{[2]} | 22,148 | 3.44% | –0.86% | 3 | ± 0 |
| National^{[2]} | 10,767 | 1.67% | –1.29% | 2 | – 1 |
| Democrats | 5,178 | 0.80% | –1.16% | 0 | ± 0 |
| Socialist | 905 | 0.14% | –0.12% | 0 | ± 0 |
| Other parties | 5,974 | 0.93% | +0.75% | 0 | ± 0 |
| Independent | 3,229 | 0.50% | –0.15% | 0 | ± 0 |
| Total | 644,354 | | | 57 | |
Two-party-preferred
| Labor | 350,996 | 53.74% | +4.71% | | |
| Liberal/NCP | 302,100 | 46.26% | –4.71% | | |

This is a list of electoral district results of the 1983 Western Australian election.

== Results by electoral district ==
=== Albany ===
1983 Western Australian state election: Albany
| Party | Candidate | Votes | % | ±% |
|---|---|---|---|---|
| Labor | Josephine Lynch | 3,370 | 44.6 | |
| Liberal | Leon Watt | 3,210 | 42.5 | |
| National Country | Darrall Simpson | 691 | 9.1 | |
| Democrats | John Chamberlain | 286 | 3.8 | |
| Total formal votes | | 7,557 | 97.4 | |
| Informal votes | | 203 | 2.6 | |
| Turnout | | 7,760 | 90.7 | |
Two-party-preferred result
| Liberal | Leon Watt | 3,949 | 52.3 | |
| Labor | Josephine Lynch | 3,608 | 47.7 | |
| Liberal hold | | Swing | | |

=== Armadale ===
1983 Western Australian state election: Armadale
| Party | Candidate | Votes | % | ±% |
|---|---|---|---|---|
| Labor | Bob Pearce | 9,232 | 63.6 | |
| Liberal | Douglas Cable | 5,290 | 36.4 | |
| Total formal votes | | 14,522 | 97.3 | |
| Informal votes | | 403 | 2.7 | |
| Turnout | | 14,925 | 88.4 | |
| Labor hold | | Swing | | |

=== Ascot ===
1983 Western Australian state election: Ascot
| Party | Candidate | Votes | % | ±% |
|---|---|---|---|---|
| Labor | Mal Bryce | 9,733 | 69.9 | |
| Liberal | Richard Dalgleish | 4,201 | 30.1 | |
| Total formal votes | | 13,934 | 97.4 | |
| Informal votes | | 374 | 2.6 | |
| Turnout | | 14,308 | 88.0 | |
| Labor hold | | Swing | | |

=== Avon ===
1983 Western Australian state election: Avon
| Party | Candidate | Votes | % | ±% |
|---|---|---|---|---|
| Labor | Ken McIver | 4,377 | 52.6 | |
| Liberal | Thomas Richards | 2,004 | 24.1 | |
| National Country | Max Trenorden | 1,938 | 23.3 | |
| Total formal votes | | 8,319 | 98.0 | |
| Informal votes | | 168 | 2.0 | |
| Turnout | | 8,487 | 90.1 | |
Two-party-preferred result
| Labor | Ken McIver | 4,858 | 58.4 | |
| Liberal | Thomas Richards | 3,461 | 41.6 | |
| Labor hold | | Swing | | |

=== Balcatta ===
1983 Western Australian state election: Balcatta
| Party | Candidate | Votes | % | ±% |
|---|---|---|---|---|
| Labor | Ron Bertram | 9,562 | 63.0 | |
| Liberal | Vincenzo Allessandrino | 5,627 | 37.0 | |
| Total formal votes | | 15,189 | 96.3 | |
| Informal votes | | 579 | 3.7 | |
| Turnout | | 15,768 | 88.0 | |
| Labor hold | | Swing | | |

=== Balga ===
1983 Western Australian state election: Balga
| Party | Candidate | Votes | % | ±% |
|---|---|---|---|---|
| Labor | Brian Burke | 11,654 | 79.0 | |
| Liberal | Peter Nolan | 3,101 | 21.0 | |
| Total formal votes | | 14,755 | 97.3 | |
| Informal votes | | 404 | 2.7 | |
| Turnout | | 15,159 | 87.0 | |
| Labor hold | | Swing | | |

=== Bunbury ===
1983 Western Australian state election: Bunbury
| Party | Candidate | Votes | % | ±% |
|---|---|---|---|---|
| Labor | Phil Smith | 4,011 | 51.2 | |
| Liberal | John Sibson | 3,588 | 45.7 | |
| Democrats | Donald Stewart | 243 | 3.1 | |
| Total formal votes | | 7,842 | 97.2 | |
| Informal votes | | 227 | 2.8 | |
| Turnout | | 8,069 | 90.9 | |
Two-party-preferred result
| Labor | Phil Smith | 4,133 | 52.7 | |
| Liberal | John Sibson | 3,709 | 47.3 | |
| Labor gain from Liberal | | Swing | | |

=== Canning ===
1983 Western Australian state election: Canning
| Party | Candidate | Votes | % | ±% |
|---|---|---|---|---|
| Labor | Tom Bateman | 9,512 | 65.6 | |
| Liberal | John Nagle | 4,980 | 34.4 | |
| Total formal votes | | 14,492 | 96.8 | |
| Informal votes | | 480 | 3.2 | |
| Turnout | | 14,972 | 87.5 | |
| Labor hold | | Swing | | |

=== Clontarf ===
1983 Western Australian state election: Clontarf
| Party | Candidate | Votes | % | ±% |
|---|---|---|---|---|
| Liberal | Tony Williams | 7,670 | 54.2 | |
| Labor | David Dale | 6,473 | 45.8 | |
| Total formal votes | | 14,143 | 97.5 | |
| Informal votes | | 356 | 2.5 | |
| Turnout | | 14,499 | 88.7 | |
| Liberal hold | | Swing | | |

=== Cockburn ===
1983 Western Australian state election: Cockburn
| Party | Candidate | Votes | % | ±% |
|---|---|---|---|---|
| Labor | Don Taylor | 12,461 | 78.6 | |
| Liberal | Gregory Bowler | 3,398 | 21.4 | |
| Total formal votes | | 15,859 | 95.7 | |
| Informal votes | | 704 | 4.3 | |
| Turnout | | 16,563 | 94.2 | |
| Labor hold | | Swing | | |

=== Collie ===
1983 Western Australian state election: Collie
| Party | Candidate | Votes | % | ±% |
|---|---|---|---|---|
| Labor | Tom Jones | 5,102 | 65.6 | |
| National Country | Allen Mountford | 2,674 | 34.4 | |
| Total formal votes | | 7,776 | 97.9 | |
| Informal votes | | 312 | 2.1 | |
| Turnout | | 7,953 | 92.1 | |
| Labor hold | | Swing | | |

=== Cottesloe ===
1983 Western Australian state election: Cottesloe
| Party | Candidate | Votes | % | ±% |
|---|---|---|---|---|
| Liberal | Bill Hassell | 7,748 | 52.9 | |
| Labor | Leslie Heinrich | 5,791 | 39.6 | |
| Democrats | Marjorie McKercher | 890 | 6.1 | |
| Independent | Alfred Bussell | 215 | 1.5 | |
| Total formal votes | | 14,644 | 97.9 | |
| Informal votes | | 312 | 2.1 | |
| Turnout | | 14,956 | 87.9 | |
Two-party-preferred result
| Liberal | Bill Hassell | 8,245 | 56.3 | |
| Labor | Leslie Heinrich | 6,399 | 43.7 | |
| Liberal hold | | Swing | | |

=== Dale ===
1983 Western Australian state election: Dale
| Party | Candidate | Votes | % | ±% |
|---|---|---|---|---|
| Labor | Philip Vincent | 4,089 | 47.9 | |
| Liberal | Cyril Rushton | 4,075 | 47.7 | |
| Democrats | Joan Farrelly | 378 | 4.4 | |
| Total formal votes | | 8,542 | 97.1 | |
| Informal votes | | 258 | 2.9 | |
| Turnout | | 8,800 | 89.5 | |
Two-party-preferred result
| Liberal | Cyril Rushton | 4,276 | 50.1 | |
| Labor | Philip Vincent | 4,266 | 49.9 | |
| Liberal hold | | Swing | | |

=== Darling Range ===
1983 Western Australian state election: Darling Range
| Party | Candidate | Votes | % | ±% |
|---|---|---|---|---|
| Liberal | George Spriggs | 4,419 | 56.6 | |
| Labor | Reginald Howard-Smith | 3,391 | 43.4 | |
| Total formal votes | | 7,810 | 97.6 | |
| Informal votes | | 191 | 2.4 | |
| Turnout | | 8,001 | 89.4 | |
| Liberal hold | | Swing | | |

=== East Melville ===
1983 Western Australian state election: East Melville
| Party | Candidate | Votes | % | ±% |
|---|---|---|---|---|
| Liberal | Anthony Trethowan | 7,907 | 53.6 | |
| Labor | Carmen Lawrence | 5,281 | 35.8 | |
| Democrats | Shirley De La Hunty | 1,565 | 10.6 | |
| Total formal votes | | 14,753 | 97.8 | |
| Informal votes | | 330 | 2.2 | |
| Turnout | | 15,083 | 93.7 | |
Two-party-preferred result
| Liberal | Anthony Trethowan | 8,690 | 58.9 | |
| Labor | Carmen Lawrence | 6,063 | 41.1 | |
| Liberal hold | | Swing | | |

=== Esperance-Dundas ===
1983 Western Australian state election: Esperance-Dundas
| Party | Candidate | Votes | % | ±% |
|---|---|---|---|---|
| Labor | Julian Grill | 5,009 | 55.9 | |
| Liberal | Geoff Grewar | 3,112 | 34.7 | |
| National Country | Robert Russell | 834 | 9.3 | |
| Total formal votes | | 8,955 | 96.5 | |
| Informal votes | | 322 | 3.5 | |
| Turnout | | 9,277 | 86.9 | |
Two-party-preferred result
| Labor | Julian Grill | 5,221 | 58.3 | |
| Liberal | Geoff Grewar | 3,734 | 41.7 | |
| Labor hold | | Swing | | |

=== Floreat ===
1983 Western Australian state election: Floreat
| Party | Candidate | Votes | % | ±% |
|---|---|---|---|---|
| Liberal | Andrew Mensaros | 8,894 | 54.6 | |
| Labor | Peter Keating | 5,772 | 35.5 | |
| Independent | Robert Ward | 1,608 | 9.9 | |
| Total formal votes | | 16,274 | 98.2 | |
| Informal votes | | 298 | 1.8 | |
| Turnout | | 16,572 | 89.1 | |
Two-party-preferred result
| Liberal | Andrew Mensaros | 9,699 | 59.6 | |
| Labor | Peter Keating | 6,575 | 40.4 | |
| Liberal hold | | Swing | | |

=== Fremantle ===
1983 Western Australian state election: Fremantle
| Party | Candidate | Votes | % | ±% |
|---|---|---|---|---|
| Labor | David Parker | 8,860 | 65.3 | |
| Liberal | Joseph Faliti | 4,030 | 29.7 | |
| Socialist Labour | Timothy Peach | 688 | 5.1 | |
| Total formal votes | | 13,578 | 94.1 | |
| Informal votes | | 843 | 5.9 | |
| Turnout | | 14,421 | 91.7 | |
Two-party-preferred result
| Labor | David Parker | 9,382 | 69.1 | |
| Liberal | Joseph Faliti | 4,196 | 30.9 | |
| Labor hold | | Swing | | |

=== Gascoyne ===
1983 Western Australian state election: Gascoyne
| Party | Candidate | Votes | % | ±% |
|---|---|---|---|---|
| Liberal | Ian Laurance | 2,026 | 61.8 | |
| Labor | John Cunningham | 1,253 | 38.2 | |
| Total formal votes | | 3,279 | 97.3 | |
| Informal votes | | 91 | 2.7 | |
| Turnout | | 3,370 | 84.6 | |
| Liberal hold | | Swing | | |

=== Geraldton ===
1983 Western Australian state election: Geraldton
| Party | Candidate | Votes | % | ±% |
|---|---|---|---|---|
| Labor | Jeff Carr | 5,324 | 63.1 | |
| Liberal | Harold Driscoll | 3,116 | 36.9 | |
| Total formal votes | | 8,440 | 98.1 | |
| Informal votes | | 162 | 1.9 | |
| Turnout | | 8,602 | 88.8 | |
| Labor hold | | Swing | | |

=== Gosnells ===
1983 Western Australian state election: Gosnells
| Party | Candidate | Votes | % | ±% |
|---|---|---|---|---|
| Labor | Yvonne Henderson | 8,981 | 61.4 | |
| Liberal | Michael Mitchell | 5,158 | 35.3 | |
| Independent | Gordon Stapp | 487 | 3.3 | |
| Total formal votes | | 14,626 | 96.7 | |
| Informal votes | | 493 | 3.3 | |
| Turnout | | 15,119 | 89.0 | |
Two-party-preferred result
| Labor | Yvonne Henderson | 9,229 | 63.1 | |
| Liberal | Michael Mitchell | 5,397 | 36.9 | |
| Labor hold | | Swing | | |

=== Greenough ===
1983 Western Australian state election: Greenough
| Party | Candidate | Votes | % | ±% |
|---|---|---|---|---|
| Liberal | Reg Tubby | 5,345 | 70.8 | |
| Labor | Timothy Gamage | 2,206 | 29.2 | |
| Total formal votes | | 7,551 | 97.3 | |
| Informal votes | | 207 | 2.7 | |
| Turnout | | 7,758 | 89.9 | |
| Liberal hold | | Swing | | |

=== Helena ===
1983 Western Australian state election: Helena
| Party | Candidate | Votes | % | ±% |
|---|---|---|---|---|
| Labor | Gordon Hill | 9,847 | 63.7 | |
| Liberal | Marianne McCall | 5,620 | 36.3 | |
| Total formal votes | | 15,467 | 97.2 | |
| Informal votes | | 447 | 2.8 | |
| Turnout | | 15,914 | 92.6 | |
| Labor hold | | Swing | | |

=== Joondalup ===
1983 Western Australian state election: Joondalup
| Party | Candidate | Votes | % | ±% |
|---|---|---|---|---|
| Labor | Jackie Watkins | 8,785 | 56.7 | |
| Liberal | Mick Nanovich | 6,698 | 43.3 | |
| Total formal votes | | 15,483 | 97.7 | |
| Informal votes | | 367 | 2.3 | |
| Turnout | | 15,850 | 89.8 | |
| Labor hold | | Swing | | |

=== Kalamunda ===
1983 Western Australian state election: Kalamunda
| Party | Candidate | Votes | % | ±% |
|---|---|---|---|---|
| Liberal | Ian Thompson | 4,444 | 57.4 | |
| Labor | Theraza Glindon | 2,886 | 37.3 | |
| Democrats | Phillip Franzone | 418 | 5.4 | |
| Total formal votes | | 7,748 | 97.4 | |
| Informal votes | | 209 | 2.6 | |
| Turnout | | 7,957 | 88.9 | |
Two-party-preferred result
| Liberal | Ian Thompson | 4,657 | 60.1 | |
| Labor | Theraza Glindon | 3,091 | 39.9 | |
| Liberal hold | | Swing | | |

=== Kalgoorlie ===
1983 Western Australian state election: Kalgoorlie
| Party | Candidate | Votes | % | ±% |
|---|---|---|---|---|
| Labor | Ian Taylor | 5,735 | 71.6 | |
| Liberal | Ross Lightfoot | 1,871 | 23.3 | |
| Independent | Maxine Cable | 408 | 5.1 | |
| Total formal votes | | 8,014 | 96.6 | |
| Informal votes | | 279 | 3.4 | |
| Turnout | | 8,293 | 90.7 | |
Two-party-preferred result
| Labor | Ian Taylor | 5,938 | 74.1 | |
| Liberal | Ross Lightfoot | 2,076 | 25.9 | |
| Labor hold | | Swing | | |

=== Karrinyup ===
1983 Western Australian state election: Karrinyup
| Party | Candidate | Votes | % | ±% |
|---|---|---|---|---|
| Liberal | Jim Clarko | 8,481 | 52.5 | |
| Labor | Richard Pitts | 6,580 | 40.7 | |
| Democrats | Jean Jenkins | 1,106 | 6.8 | |
| Total formal votes | | 16,167 | 97.9 | |
| Informal votes | | 346 | 2.1 | |
| Turnout | | 16,513 | 89.3 | |
Two-party-preferred result
| Liberal | Jim Clarko | 9,037 | 55.9 | |
| Labor | Richard Pitts | 7,130 | 44.1 | |
| Liberal hold | | Swing | | |

=== Katanning-Roe ===
1983 Western Australian state election: Katanning-Roe
| Party | Candidate | Votes | % | ±% |
|---|---|---|---|---|
| National Country | Dick Old | 6,541 | 82.1 | |
| Labor | Marilyn Elson | 1,423 | 17.9 | |
| Total formal votes | | 7,984 | 97.7 | |
| Informal votes | | 184 | 2.3 | |
| Turnout | | 8,148 | 89.5 | |
| National Country hold | | Swing | | |

=== Kimberley ===
1983 Western Australian state election: Kimberley
| Party | Candidate | Votes | % | ±% |
|---|---|---|---|---|
| Labor | Ernie Bridge | 6,563 | 65.9 | |
| Liberal | Robert Whitton | 3,396 | 34.1 | |
| Total formal votes | | 9,959 | 94.4 | |
| Informal votes | | 587 | 5.6 | |
| Turnout | | 10,546 | 84.3 | |
| Labor hold | | Swing | | |

=== Mandurah ===
1983 Western Australian state election: Mandurah
| Party | Candidate | Votes | % | ±% |
|---|---|---|---|---|
| Liberal | Richard Shalders | 4,050 | 48.0 | |
| Labor | John Read | 3,947 | 46.8 | |
| Independent | Leonard Attwill | 434 | 5.2 | |
| Total formal votes | | 8,431 | 98.4 | |
| Informal votes | | 133 | 1.6 | |
| Turnout | | 8,564 | 91.9 | |
Two-party-preferred result
| Labor | John Read | 4,243 | 50.3 | |
| Liberal | Richard Shalders | 4,188 | 49.7 | |
| Labor gain from Liberal | | Swing | | |

=== Maylands ===
1983 Western Australian state election: Maylands
| Party | Candidate | Votes | % | ±% |
|---|---|---|---|---|
| Labor | John Harman | 9,169 | 64.9 | |
| Liberal | Wouterina Klein | 4,952 | 35.1 | |
| Total formal votes | | 14,121 | 97.1 | |
| Informal votes | | 420 | 2.9 | |
| Turnout | | 14,541 | 86.8 | |
| Labor hold | | Swing | | |

=== Melville ===
1983 Western Australian state election: Melville
| Party | Candidate | Votes | % | ±% |
|---|---|---|---|---|
| Labor | Barry Hodge | 11,464 | 71.2 | |
| Liberal | Judith Gleeson | 4,629 | 28.8 | |
| Total formal votes | | 16,093 | 97.3 | |
| Informal votes | | 447 | 2.7 | |
| Turnout | | 16,540 | 92.9 | |
| Labor hold | | Swing | | |

=== Merredin ===
1983 Western Australian state election: Merredin
| Party | Candidate | Votes | % | ±% |
|---|---|---|---|---|
| National | Hendy Cowan | 4,872 | 60.7 | |
| National Country | Harold Lang | 1,804 | 22.5 | |
| Liberal | Richard Cooper | 1,067 | 13.3 | |
| Independent | Zoran Panzich | 283 | 3.5 | |
| Total formal votes | | 8,026 | 97.1 | |
| Informal votes | | 242 | 2.9 | |
| Turnout | | 8,268 | 90.5 | |
Two-candidate-preferred result
| National | Hendy Cowan | 5,217 | 65.0 | |
| National Country | Harold Lang | 2,809 | 35.0 | |
| National hold | | Swing | | |

=== Mitchell ===
1983 Western Australian state election: Mitchell
| Party | Candidate | Votes | % | ±% |
|---|---|---|---|---|
| Labor | David Smith | 5,001 | 56.9 | |
| Liberal | June Craig | 3,785 | 43.1 | |
| Total formal votes | | 8,716 | 97.6 | |
| Informal votes | | 215 | 2.4 | |
| Turnout | | 9,001 | 92.1 | |
| Labor hold | | Swing | | |

=== Moore ===
1983 Western Australian state election: Moore
| Party | Candidate | Votes | % | ±% |
|---|---|---|---|---|
| National Country | Bert Crane | 4,295 | 52.6 | |
| Liberal | Ernest Twine | 2,117 | 25.9 | |
| Labor | Michael O'Rourke | 1,754 | 21.5 | |
| Total formal votes | | 8,166 | 97.5 | |
| Informal votes | | 205 | 2.5 | |
| Turnout | | 8,371 | 89.9 | |
Two-candidate-preferred result
| National Country | Bert Crane | 5,169 | 63.3 | |
| Liberal | Ernest Twine | 2,997 | 36.7 | |
| National Country hold | | Swing | | |

=== Morley-Swan ===
1983 Western Australian state election: Morley-Swan
| Party | Candidate | Votes | % | ±% |
|---|---|---|---|---|
| Labor | Arthur Tonkin | 10,743 | 69.1 | |
| Liberal | Ramsay Bogunovich | 4,436 | 28.5 | |
| Independent | James Connolly | 375 | 2.4 | |
| Total formal votes | | 15,554 | 95.0 | |
| Informal votes | | 819 | 5.0 | |
| Turnout | | 16,373 | 88.8 | |
Two-party-preferred result
| Labor | Arthur Tonkin | 11,028 | 70.9 | |
| Liberal | Ramsay Bogunovich | 4,526 | 29.1 | |
| Labor hold | | Swing | | |

=== Mount Lawley ===
1983 Western Australian state election: Mount Lawley
| Party | Candidate | Votes | % | ±% |
|---|---|---|---|---|
| Liberal | Ray O'Connor | 7,909 | 53.0 | |
| Labor | Desmond Hoffman | 6,789 | 45.5 | |
| Communist | Cedric Beidatsch | 217 | 1.5 | |
| Total formal votes | | 14,915 | 96.8 | |
| Informal votes | | 499 | 3.2 | |
| Turnout | | 15,414 | 87.6 | |
Two-party-preferred result
| Liberal | Ray O'Connor | 7,965 | 53.4 | |
| Labor | Desmond Hoffman | 6,950 | 46.6 | |
| Liberal hold | | Swing | | |

=== Mount Marshall ===
1983 Western Australian state election: Mount Marshall
| Party | Candidate | Votes | % | ±% |
|---|---|---|---|---|
| Liberal | Bill McNee | 2,596 | 33.0 | |
| National Country | Ray McPharlin | 2,119 | 26.9 | |
| National | Ronald Aitkenhead | 1,815 | 23.1 | |
| Labor | Robert Couzens | 1,333 | 17.0 | |
| Total formal votes | | 7,863 | 97.6 | |
| Informal votes | | 191 | 2.4 | |
| Turnout | | 8,054 | 89.8 | |
Two-candidate-preferred result
| Liberal | Bill McNee | 4,381 | 55.7 | |
| National | Ronald Aitkenhead | 3,482 | 44.3 | |
| Liberal gain from National Country | | Swing | | |

=== Mundaring ===
1983 Western Australian state election: Mundaring
| Party | Candidate | Votes | % | ±% |
|---|---|---|---|---|
| Liberal | Tom Herzfeld | 3,886 | 48.3 | |
| Labor | Gavan Troy | 3,862 | 48.0 | |
| Democrats | Bryan Scott-Courtland | 292 | 3.6 | |
| Total formal votes | | 8,040 | 97.5 | |
| Informal votes | | 202 | 2.5 | |
| Turnout | | 8,242 | 89.3 | |
Two-party-preferred result
| Labor | Gavan Troy | 4,028 | 50.1 | |
| Liberal | Tom Herzfeld | 4,012 | 49.9 | |
| Labor gain from Liberal | | Swing | | |

=== Murchison-Eyre ===
1983 Western Australian state election: Murchison-Eyre
| Party | Candidate | Votes | % | ±% |
|---|---|---|---|---|
| Liberal | Peter Coyne | 1,167 | 49.3 | |
| Labor | Frank Donovan | 1,052 | 44.4 | |
| Independent | Kevin Seivwright | 149 | 6.3 | |
| Total formal votes | | 2,368 | 96.0 | |
| Informal votes | | 98 | 4.0 | |
| Turnout | | 2,466 | 76.8 | |
Two-party-preferred result
| Liberal | Peter Coyne | 1,214 | 51.3 | |
| Labor | Francis Donovan | 1,541 | 48.7 | |
| Liberal hold | | Swing | | |

=== Murdoch ===
1983 Western Australian state election: Murdoch
| Party | Candidate | Votes | % | ±% |
|---|---|---|---|---|
| Liberal | Barry MacKinnon | 8,832 | 53.2 | |
| Labor | Eric Ripper | 7,503 | 45.2 | |
| Independent | James Owen | 276 | 1.7 | |
| Total formal votes | | 16,611 | 97.9 | |
| Informal votes | | 347 | 2.1 | |
| Turnout | | 16,958 | 91.1 | |
Two-party-preferred result
| Liberal | Barry MacKinnon | 8,970 | 54.0 | |
| Labor | Eric Ripper | 7,641 | 46.0 | |
| Liberal hold | | Swing | | |

=== Murray-Wellington ===
1983 Western Australian state election: Murray-Wellington
| Party | Candidate | Votes | % | ±% |
|---|---|---|---|---|
| Liberal | John Bradshaw | 4,666 | 56.7 | |
| Labor | James Hersey | 3,317 | 40.3 | |
| Independent | Marius Loeffler | 242 | 2.9 | |
| Total formal votes | | 8,225 | 97.3 | |
| Informal votes | | 232 | 2.7 | |
| Turnout | | 8,457 | 90.8 | |
Two-party-preferred result
| Liberal | John Bradshaw | 4,787 | 58.2 | |
| Labor | James Hersey | 3,438 | 41.8 | |
| Liberal hold | | Swing | | |

=== Narrogin ===
1983 Western Australian state election: Narrogin
| Party | Candidate | Votes | % | ±% |
|---|---|---|---|---|
| National Country | Peter Jones | unopposed | | |
| National Country hold | | Swing | | |

=== Nedlands ===
1983 Western Australian state election: Nedlands
| Party | Candidate | Votes | % | ±% |
|---|---|---|---|---|
| Liberal | Richard Court | 8,945 | 64.1 | |
| Labor | Saliba Sassine | 5,011 | 35.9 | |
| Total formal votes | | 13,956 | 98.0 | |
| Informal votes | | 280 | 2.0 | |
| Turnout | | 14,236 | 88.7 | |
| Liberal hold | | Swing | | |

=== Nollamara ===
1983 Western Australian state election: Nollamara
| Party | Candidate | Votes | % | ±% |
|---|---|---|---|---|
| Labor | Keith Wilson | 8,085 | 61.3 | |
| Liberal | Gregory Wilson | 5,107 | 38.7 | |
| Total formal votes | | 13,192 | 97.6 | |
| Informal votes | | 326 | 2.4 | |
| Turnout | | 13,518 | 89.0 | |
| Labor hold | | Swing | | |

=== Perth ===
1983 Western Australian state election: Perth
| Party | Candidate | Votes | % | ±% |
|---|---|---|---|---|
| Labor | Terry Burke | 9,023 | 67.8 | |
| Liberal | Peter Bogue | 4,289 | 32.2 | |
| Total formal votes | | 13,312 | 95.5 | |
| Informal votes | | 630 | 4.5 | |
| Turnout | | 13,942 | 80.7 | |
| Labor hold | | Swing | | |

=== Pilbara ===
1983 Western Australian state election: Pilbara
| Party | Candidate | Votes | % | ±% |
|---|---|---|---|---|
| Labor | Pam Buchanan | 5,382 | 58.8 | |
| Liberal | David Penny | 3,195 | 34.9 | |
| Independent | Vincent Cooper | 581 | 6.3 | |
| Total formal votes | | 9,158 | 94.8 | |
| Informal votes | | 498 | 5.2 | |
| Turnout | | 9,656 | 91.3 | |
Two-party-preferred result
| Labor | Pam Buchanan | 6,182 | 67.5 | |
| Liberal | David Penny | 2,976 | 32.5 | |
| Labor gain from Liberal | | Swing | | |

=== Rockingham ===
1983 Western Australian state election: Rockingham
| Party | Candidate | Votes | % | ±% |
|---|---|---|---|---|
| Labor | Mike Barnett | 10,260 | 69.7 | |
| Liberal | Maureen Mileham | 4,466 | 30.3 | |
| Total formal votes | | 14,726 | 98.0 | |
| Informal votes | | 296 | 2.0 | |
| Turnout | | 15,022 | 90.9 | |
| Labor hold | | Swing | | |

=== Scarborough ===
1983 Western Australian state election: Scarborough
| Party | Candidate | Votes | % | ±% |
|---|---|---|---|---|
| Labor | Graham Burkett | 8,053 | 55.7 | |
| Liberal | Ray Young | 6,416 | 44.3 | |
| Total formal votes | | 14,469 | 98.0 | |
| Informal votes | | 290 | 2.0 | |
| Turnout | | 14,759 | 87.0 | |
| Labor gain from Liberal | | Swing | | |

=== South Perth ===
1983 Western Australian state election: South Perth
| Party | Candidate | Votes | % | ±% |
|---|---|---|---|---|
| Liberal | Bill Grayden | 7,836 | 54.5 | |
| Labor | Sten Jakobsen | 6,533 | 45.5 | |
| Total formal votes | | 14,369 | 98.0 | |
| Informal votes | | 288 | 2.0 | |
| Turnout | | 14,657 | 85.9 | |
| Liberal hold | | Swing | | |

=== Stirling ===
1983 Western Australian state election: Stirling
| Party | Candidate | Votes | % | ±% |
|---|---|---|---|---|
| National | Matt Stephens | 4,080 | 53.6 | |
| Liberal | Peter Skinner | 2,761 | 36.2 | |
| National Country | Thomas Buxton | 775 | 10.2 | |
| Total formal votes | | 7,616 | 97.1 | |
| Informal votes | | 225 | 2.9 | |
| Turnout | | 7,841 | 90.9 | |
Two-candidate-preferred result
| National | Matt Stephens | 4,273 | 56.1 | |
| Liberal | Peter Skinner | 3,373 | 43.9 | |
| National hold | | Swing | | |

=== Subiaco ===
1983 Western Australian state election: Subiaco
| Party | Candidate | Votes | % | ±% |
|---|---|---|---|---|
| Liberal | Tom Dadour | 7,108 | 51.6 | |
| Labor | William Bartholomaeus | 6,666 | 48.4 | |
| Total formal votes | | 13,774 | 97.7 | |
| Informal votes | | 322 | 2.3 | |
| Turnout | | 14,096 | 85.4 | |
| Liberal hold | | Swing | | |

=== Vasse ===
1983 Western Australian state election: Vasse
| Party | Candidate | Votes | % | ±% |
|---|---|---|---|---|
| Liberal | Barry Blaikie | 4,947 | 59.5 | |
| Labor | Dane Carroll | 2,586 | 31.1 | |
| Independent | Stewart Melville | 783 | 9.4 | |
| Total formal votes | | 8,316 | 97.8 | |
| Informal votes | | 187 | 2.2 | |
| Turnout | | 8,503 | 92.4 | |
Two-party-preferred result
| Liberal | Barry Blaikie | 5,339 | 64.2 | |
| Labor | Dane Carroll | 2,977 | 35.8 | |
| Liberal hold | | Swing | | |

=== Victoria Park ===
1983 Western Australian state election: Victoria Park
| Party | Candidate | Votes | % | ±% |
|---|---|---|---|---|
| Labor | Ron Davies | 9,038 | 67.1 | |
| Liberal | Pauline Iles | 4,432 | 32.9 | |
| Total formal votes | | 13,470 | 97.1 | |
| Informal votes | | 396 | 2.9 | |
| Turnout | | 13,866 | 85.1 | |
| Labor hold | | Swing | | |

=== Warren ===
1983 Western Australian state election: Warren
| Party | Candidate | Votes | % | ±% |
|---|---|---|---|---|
| Labor | David Evans | 4,442 | 60.8 | |
| Liberal | Ross Young | 2,250 | 30.8 | |
| National Country | Noel Klopper | 477 | 6.5 | |
| Independent | Noel Duggan | 133 | 1.8 | |
| Total formal votes | | 7,302 | 97.4 | |
| Informal votes | | 198 | 2.6 | |
| Turnout | | 7,500 | 91.3 | |
Two-party-preferred result
| Labor | David Evans | 4,629 | 63.4 | |
| Liberal | Ross Young | 2,673 | 36.6 | |
| Labor hold | | Swing | | |

=== Welshpool ===
1983 Western Australian state election: Welshpool
| Party | Candidate | Votes | % | ±% |
|---|---|---|---|---|
| Labor | Colin Jamieson | 9,482 | 64.8 | |
| Liberal | Robert Gray | 5,159 | 35.2 | |
| Total formal votes | | 14,641 | 96.5 | |
| Informal votes | | 525 | 3.5 | |
| Turnout | | 15,166 | 87.8 | |
| Labor hold | | Swing | | |

=== Whitford ===
1983 Western Australian state election: Whitford
| Party | Candidate | Votes | % | ±% |
|---|---|---|---|---|
| Labor | Pam Beggs | 8,778 | 57.7 | |
| Liberal | Darryll Retallack | 6,434 | 42.3 | |
| Total formal votes | | 15,212 | 98.1 | |
| Informal votes | | 287 | 1.9 | |
| Turnout | | 15,499 | 88.6 | |
| Labor gain from Liberal | | Swing | | |

== See also ==
- 1983 Western Australian state election
- Members of the Western Australian Legislative Assembly, 1983–1986
