= Gordon Atkinson =

Gordon Atkinson may refer to:

- Gordon Atkinson (Australian politician) (1941–1984), state politician in Western Australia
- Gordon Atkinson (Canadian politician) (1922–2006), provincial politician in Quebec
