= South Metropolitan Region =

South Metropolitan Region Western Australia—Legislative Council
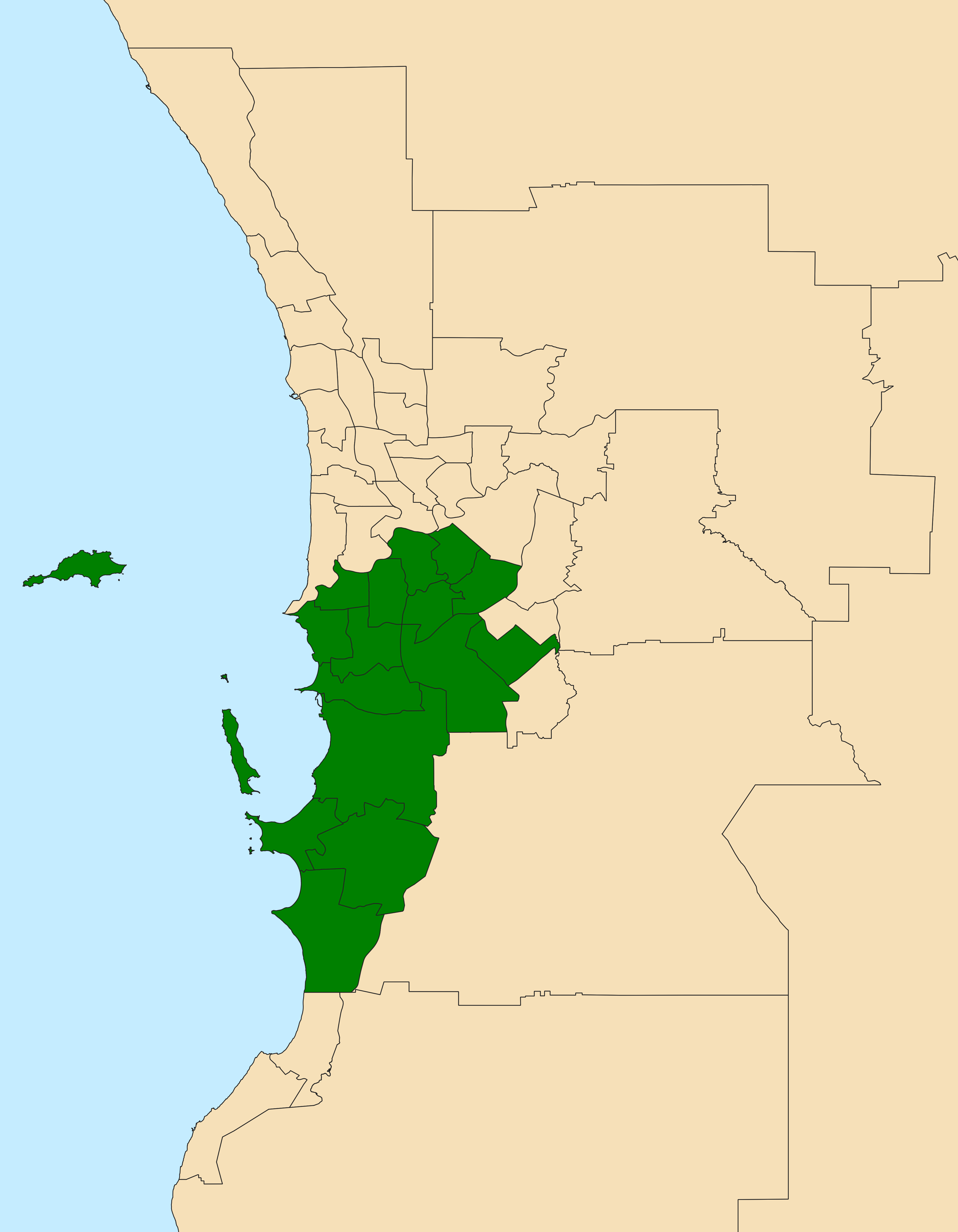
- State: Western Australia
- Dates current: 1989–2025
- Electors: 449,182 (2021)
- Area: 799 km^{2} (308.5 sq mi)
- Demographic: Metropolitan

The South Metropolitan Region was a multi-member electoral region of the Western Australian Legislative Council, located in the southern suburbs of Perth, Western Australia. It was created by the Acts Amendment (Electoral Reform) Act 1987, and became effective on 22 May 1989 with five members who had been elected at the 1989 state election three months earlier. At the 2008 election, it was increased to six members.

The region, along with all other Western Australian Electoral Regions, was abolished in time with the 2025 state election, following legislation passed in November 2021 to create a single, state-wide constituency of 37 members.

== Geography ==
The Region was made up of several complete Legislative Assembly districts, which change at each distribution.

Redistribution	Period	Electoral districts	Electors	% of State	Area
29 April 1988	22 May 1989 – 22 May 1997	Applecross, Cockburn, Fremantle, Jandakot, Melville, Peel, Riverton, Rockingham, South Perth, Victoria Park (10)	195,574	21.51%	590 km^{2} (230 sq mi)
28 November 1994	22 May 1997 – 22 May 2005	Alfred Cove, Cockburn, Fremantle, Murdoch, Peel, Riverton, Rockingham, South Perth, Victoria Park, Electoral district of Willagee (10)	221,337	21.61%	590 km^{2} (230 sq mi)
4 August 2003	22 May 2005 – 22 May 2009	Alfred Cove, Cockburn, Fremantle, Murdoch, Peel, Riverton, Rockingham, South Perth, Victoria Park, Electoral district of Willagee (10)	263,620	21.69%	577 km^{2} (223 sq mi)
29 October 2007	22 May 2009 – 22 May 2017	Alfred Cove, Bateman, Cannington, Cockburn, Fremantle, Jandakot, Kwinana, Riverton, Rockingham, South Perth, Southern River, Victoria Park, Warnbro, Willagee (14)	311,583	26.09%	754 km^{2} (291 sq mi)
27 November 2015	22 May 2017 – 22 May 2021	Baldivis, Bateman, Bicton, Cannington, Cockburn, Fremantle, Jandakot, Kwinana, Riverton, Rockingham, South Perth, Southern River, Victoria Park, Warnbro, Willagee (15)	409,325	25.69%	753 km^{2} (291 sq mi)
27 November 2019	22 May 2021 – 22 May 2025	As per 2015	449,182	26.16%	799 km^{2} (308 sq mi)

== Representation ==
=== Distribution of seats ===
As 5-member seat:
Election	Seats won
1989–1993	
1993–1997	
1997–2001	
2001–2005	
2005–2009	

As 6-member seat:
Election	Seats won
2009–2013	
2013–2017	
2017–2021	
2021–2025	

Legend:
Labor
Liberal
Greens WA
Liberal Democrats

=== Members ===
Since its creation, the electorate had 16 members. Four of the members elected in 1989 had previously been members of the Legislative Council—Clive Griffiths and Phillip Pendal (both South Central Metropolitan), John Halden (North Metropolitan) and Garry Kelly (South Metropolitan).

Members for South Metropolitan Region
Year	Member	Party	Member	Party	Member	Party	Member	Party	Member	Party	Member	Party
1989	Cheryl Davenport	Labor	John Halden	Labor	Garry Kelly	Labor	Phillip Pendal	Liberal	Clive Griffiths	Liberal		
1993	Cheryl Davenport	Labor	John Halden	Labor	Garry Kelly	Labor	Diane Airey	Liberal	Clive Griffiths	Liberal		
1993	Cheryl Davenport	Labor	John Halden	Labor	Jim Scott	Greens	Barbara Scott	Liberal	Clive Griffiths	Liberal		
1996	Cheryl Davenport	Labor	John Halden	Labor	Jim Scott	Greens	Barbara Scott	Liberal	Simon O'Brien	Liberal		
2000	Cheryl Davenport	Labor	Graham Giffard	Labor	Jim Scott	Greens	Barbara Scott	Liberal	Simon O'Brien	Liberal		
2001	Kate Doust	Labor	Sue Ellery	Labor	Jim Scott	Greens	Barbara Scott	Liberal	Simon O'Brien	Liberal		
2005	Kate Doust	Labor	Sue Ellery	Labor	Lynn MacLaren	Greens	Barbara Scott	Liberal	Simon O'Brien	Liberal		
2005	Kate Doust	Labor	Sue Ellery	Labor	Sheila Mills	Labor	Barbara Scott	Liberal	Simon O'Brien	Liberal		
2008	Kate Doust	Labor	Sue Ellery	Labor	Lynn MacLaren	Greens	Phil Edman	Liberal	Simon O'Brien	Liberal	Nick Goiran	Liberal
2013	Kate Doust	Labor	Sue Ellery	Labor	Lynn MacLaren	Greens	Phil Edman	Liberal	Simon O'Brien	Liberal	Nick Goiran	Liberal
2017	Kate Doust	Labor	Sue Ellery	Labor	Pierre Yang	Labor	Aaron Stonehouse	Liberal Democratic	Simon O'Brien	Liberal	Nick Goiran	Liberal
2021	Kate Doust	Labor	Sue Ellery	Labor	Klara Andric	Labor	Stephen Pratt	Labor	Brad Pettitt	Greens	Nick Goiran	Liberal
2025	Kate Doust	Labor	Sue Ellery	Labor	Klara Andric	Labor	Victoria Helps	Labor	Brad Pettitt	Greens	Nick Goiran	Liberal

== Election results ==
2021 Western Australian state election: South Metropolitan
Party	Candidate	Votes	%	±%
Quota		54,302		
Labor	1. Sue Ellery (elected 1); 2. Kate Doust (elected 3); 3. Klara Andric (elected 4); 4. Stephen Pratt (elected 5); 5. Victoria Helps; 6. Kelly McManus	239,248	62.94	+18.08
Liberal	1. Nick Goiran (elected 2); 2. Michelle Hofmann; 3. Ka-ren Chew; 4. Robert Reid; 5. Nitin Vashisht; 6. Scott Stirling	67,000	17.63	−7.22
Greens	1. Brad Pettitt (elected 6); 2. Lynn MacLaren; 3. Daniel Garlett	26,257	6.91	−2.34
Christians	1. Warnar Spyker; 2. Sylvia Iradukunda	7,290	1.92	−0.06
Legalise Cannabis	1. Moshe Bernstein; 2. Scott Shortland	6,877	1.81	+1.81
One Nation	1. Philip Scott; 2. Bradley Dickinson	3,972	1.04	−5.95
Shooters, Fishers, Farmers	1. Steven Tonge; 2. Paul Bedford	3,920	1.03	−0.47
No Mandatory Vaccination	1. Cam Tinley; 2. Michael Fletcher; 3. Greg Bell	3,842	1.01	+1.01
Liberal Democrats	1. Aaron Stonehouse; 2. Harvey Smith; 3. Jared Neaves; 4. Ivan Tomshin; 5. Laurentiu Zamfirescu; 6. Peter Leech	3,369	0.89	−3.02
Liberals for Climate	1. Keith Pomeroy; 2. Daniel Herron	3,262	0.86	+0.49
Animal Justice	1. Colleen Saporita; 2. Katrina Love	3,033	0.80	−0.48
Western Australia	1. Katy Mair; 2. Gavin Waugh	2,312	0.61	+0.27
Independent	1. Graham West; 2. Liam Strickland	1,683	0.44	+0.44
WAxit	1. Peter McLernon; 2. Jo-Anne Vincent-Barwood	1,341	0.35	−0.33
Daylight Saving	1. Amanda Klaj; 2. Craig Curtis	1,319	0.35	−0.45
Sustainable Australia	1. Ryan Oostryck; 2. Jane Loveday	1,169	0.31	+0.31
Great Australian	1. Samantha Vinci; 2. Susan Hoddinott	1,097	0.29	+0.29
Socialist Alliance	1. Marianne Mackay; 2. Dirk Kelly	948	0.25	−0.14
Health Australia	1. Michele Castle; 2. Catheryn Wright	646	0.17	+0.17
Independent	Larry Foley	397	0.10	+0.10
Independent	1. Jourdan Kestel; 2. Lee Herridge	371	0.10	+0.10
Independent	1. Mark Rowley; 2. Marlie Touchell	273	0.07	+0.07
Independent	1. Glen Leslie; 2. Stephen Yarwood	202	0.05	+0.05
Independent	1. Stan Francis; 2. Jeremy Lay	160	0.04	+0.04
Independent	1. Dave Glossop; 2. Lewis Butto	112	0.03	+0.03
Independent	Leon Hamilton	10	0.00	+0.00
Total formal votes		380,110	98.08	+0.99
Informal votes		7,432	1.92	−0.99
Turnout		387,542	86.28	−0.93
