= East Metropolitan Province =

Was an electoral province in Perth, Western Australia

The East Metropolitan Province was a two-member electoral province of the Western Australian Legislative Council, located in metropolitan Perth. It was created by a redistribution in 1976, and took effect on 22 May 1977 following the 1977 state election. It was formed from parts of the North-East Metropolitan and South-East Metropolitan provinces, and was a safe Labor seat.

The province had two concurrent members during its brief history — Bob Hetherington and Fred McKenzie, both of the Labor Party. The 1982 redistribution increased the number of metropolitan provinces from 6 to 7 (as against 10 in the rural and peri-urban areas), but abolished the East Metropolitan Province. Its members won election in neighbouring provinces at the 1983 election.

The province was made up of four complete Legislative Assembly districts — those of Ascot, Canning, Victoria Park and Welshpool.

== Geography ==
The province was made up of several complete Legislative Assembly districts, which changed at each distribution.

Redistribution	Period	Electoral districts	Electors	% of State
1976	22 May 1977 – 22 May 1983	Ascot, Canning, Victoria Park, Welshpool	62,396	9.86

== Representation ==
=== Members ===
Member 1	Party	Term	Member 2	Party	Term
Bob Hetherington	Labor	1977–1983	Fred McKenzie	Labor	1977–1983
