= Garry Kelly =

Australian politician

The Honourable Garry Kelly

Member of the Legislative Council of Western Australia
- In office 13 March 1982 – 21 May 1989
- Preceded by: Howard Olney
- Succeeded by: None (seat abolished)
- Constituency: South Metropolitan Province
- In office 22 May 1989 – 21 May 1993 Serving with Airey, Davenport, Halden, Pendal
- Constituency: South Metropolitan Region

Personal details
- Born: Garry Kenneth Kelly; 26 May 1948 Subiaco, Western Australia
- Died: 11 July 2002 (aged 54) Thomsons Lake, Western Australia
- Party: Labor

Garry Kenneth Kelly (26 May 1948 – 11 July 2002) was an Australian politician who served as a Labor Party member of the Legislative Council of Western Australia from 1982 to 1993. He stood for parliament eight times in total, winning four elections.

Kelly was born in Perth to Rita Phyllis (née Limmer) and Kenneth John Kelly. He attended Manjimup Senior High School, Northam Senior High School, and Melville Senior High School before going on to the Western Australian Institute of Technology (graduating with a physics degree) and the University of Western Australia (graduating with a teaching certificate). Before entering parliament, he worked as a schoolteacher, teaching at Armadale Senior High School and Applecross Senior High School. Kelly first ran for parliament at the age of 22, contesting the Legislative Council's Metropolitan Province (a Liberal Party safe seat) at the 1971 state election. At the next three state elections, he ran for the Legislative Assembly, contesting South Perth at the 1974 election and Murdoch at the 1977 and 1980 elections. In 1980, Kelly collapsed at work and fractured his skull. His injury left him in a coma for several weeks and required brain surgery followed by a lengthy period of recovery.

In 1982, Kelly won a Legislative Council by-election for South Metropolitan Province, occasioned by the resignation of Howard Olney. He was re-elected at the 1986 state election, and was subsequently appointed deputy chairman of committees. At the 1989 election, Kelly's old seat was abolished and he was elected to the new five-member South Metropolitan Region. He was elected chairman of committees in March 1992, replacing Jim Brown. However, prior to the 1993 election, "factional manoeuvres" relegated Kelly to the unwinnable third position on the Labor ticket, and he lost his seat. Kelly killed himself in July 2002, aged 54, after a period of depression. He had married twice, having three children by his first wife (who died of breast cancer in 1998) and two step-children from his second marriage.
