= Victoria Helps =

Australian trade unionist and former politician

Member of the Western Australian Legislative Council
- In office 3 April 2025 – 22 May 2025
- Preceded by: Stephen Pratt
- Succeeded by: Seat abolished
- Constituency: South Metropolitan Region

Personal details
- Party: Labor

Victoria Helps (also known as Vicki Helps) is an Australian trade unionist and former politician. She served as a member of the Western Australian Legislative Council for the South Metropolitan Region from April to May 2025.

== Early life ==
Helps arrived in Australia as a toddler when her family migrated from postwar Italy. They settled in the port precinct of Fremantle. She attended John Curtin College of the Arts.

In 1979, shortly before turning 18, she worked as a governess on a sheep station near Leonora. She later married and had two children. She completed a degree in education as a mature-age student before teaching high school.

Following divorce in her 40s, Helps retrained as a marine steward and joined her first ship in 2008.

== Marine Career ==
Helps has worked as a seafarer since 2008. She became active in the Maritime Union of Australia, serving as a delegate and on state and national women’s committees. She has campaigned against the privatisation and automation of ports.

In 2022 she was a Labor candidate for the Senate in Western Australia.

== Political career ==
Helps was elected to the Legislative Council on 3 April 2025 to fill a casual vacancy following the resignation of Stephen Pratt. She served until the end of the parliamentary term on 21 May 2025.

She delivered her inaugural speech on 10 April 2025.
