= Cheryl Davenport =

Australian politician

Cheryl May Davenport AM née Crockenberg (born 19 January 1947) is a former Australian politician.

She was born in Pinjarra and was an electorate officer before entering politics. In 1989 she was elected to the Western Australian Legislative Council as a Labor member for South Metropolitan. From 1993 to 1996 she was Deputy Chairman of Committees, and then from 1997 to 2001 she was Shadow Minister for Seniors. Davenport retired in 2001.

Davenport wrote and moved the Acts Amendment (Abortion) Bill 1998 from opposition, making Western Australia the first Australian state to have legalised abortion.

Davenport is the patron on multiple non profit organisations.

Her contribution was recognised by her appointment as a Member of the Order of Australia for "significant service to the Parliament of Western Australia, and to the community" in the 2021 Queen's Birthday Honours.
