= Peter Wells (politician) =

Australian politician

Peter Henry Wells (22 October 1937 – 25 December 2005) was an Australian politician.

He was born in St Arnaud in Victoria to railway employee Harry Stevens Wells and Alice Rebecca Eileen Blackman Lingwood. In 1955 he became a minister and welfare worker with the Salvation Army in Western Australia, and in 1960 became a draftsman and sampler with Central Norseman Gold Mines. On 4 February 1961 he married Dorothy Eva Clarke, with whom he had three children. He also worked as a part-time lecturer in cartography at mining schools in Norseman and Kalgoorlie. From 1970 he was chief exploration draftsman for International Nickel Australia.

Wells was an active member of the Liberal Party in Western Australia, serving as president of the Stirling division of the party from 1976. In 1980 he was elected to the Western Australian Legislative Council for North Metropolitan Province. He was Shadow Minister for Multicultural and Ethnic Affairs and the Arts from 1983 to 1984. In 1986 he was defeated, and he became a research officer for Gordon Masters and later for George Cash. He was director of computer technology for the WA Liberal Party from 1989 to 1994 and state director of the party from 1995 to 2002. Wells died in Balga in 2005.

Western Australian Legislative Council
Preceded by Roy Claughton	Member for North Metropolitan Province; 1980–1986	Succeeded by John Halden
