= Electoral district of Esperance-Dundas =

Former electoral district in Western Australia

Esperance-Dundas Western Australia—Legislative Assembly
- State: Western Australia
- Dates current: 1983–1989
- Namesake: Esperance; Shire of Dundas

Esperance-Dundas was an electoral district of the Legislative Assembly in the Australian state of Western Australia from 1983 to 1989.

The district was located in the Goldfields-Esperance region, extending from Esperance on the south coast northwards to Norseman and including some Kalgoorlie suburbs. It was formed from parts of the former electorates of Yilgarn-Dundas and Roe at the 1983 state election.

It existed for two terms of parliament, and was represented in that time by Labor member Julian Grill, who had previously been the member for Yilgarn-Dundas. Following the abolition of Esperance-Dundas at the 1989 state election, Grill became the member for Eyre.

== Members for Esperance-Dundas ==
Member	Party	Term
Julian Grill	Labor	1983–1989
