= South Central Metropolitan Province =

The South Central Metropolitan Province was a two-member electoral province of the Western Australian Legislative Council, located in metropolitan Perth. It was created by a redistribution in 1982, and took effect on 22 May 1983 following the 1983 state election. It was formed from parts of the South Metropolitan and South-East Metropolitan provinces, and was a safe Liberal seat.

The province had two concurrent members during its brief history — Clive Griffiths and Phillip Pendal, both of the Liberal Party. In 1989, the province was abolished by the Acts Amendment (Electoral Reform) Act 1987, and with two others became part of the five-member South Metropolitan Region under the new proportional voting system. Both the province's members were elected to represent the region.

== Geography ==
The province was made up of several complete Legislative Assembly districts, which changed at each distribution.

Redistribution	Period	Electoral districts	Electors	% of State
1982	22 May 1983 – 22 May 1989	Clontarf, East Melville, South Perth, Victoria Park		

== Representation ==
=== Members ===
Member 1	Party	Term	Member 2	Party	Term
Phillip Pendal	Liberal	1983–1989	Clive Griffiths	Liberal	1983–1989
