= Gordon Atkinson (Australian politician) =

Australian politician

The Honourable Gordon Atkinson

Member of the Legislative Council of Western Australia
- In office 22 May 1983 – 4 August 1984
- Preceded by: Norm Baxter
- Succeeded by: Eric Charlton
- Constituency: Central Province

Personal details
- Born: 14 April 1941 Geraldton, Western Australia, Australia
- Died: 4 August 1984 (aged 43) Northam, Western Australia, Australia
- Party: Liberal

William Gordon Atkinson (14 April 1941 – 4 August 1984) was an Australian farmer and politician who was a Liberal Party member of the Legislative Council of Western Australia from 1983 until his death.

Atkinson was born in Geraldton, to Jessie (née Peden) and Harry Leonard Atkinson. His family moved to Dalwallinu (a small Wheatbelt town) when he was a child, and he attended Northam Senior High School and Muresk Agricultural College. After leaving school, Atkinson farmed at Dalwallinu, becoming prominent in agricultural circles. He first stood for parliament at the 1980 state election, losing to Harry Gayfer (the sitting National Country member) in Central Province. Atkinson recontested the seat at the 1983 election, and was elected on just 26.1 percent of first preferences. However, he served in parliament for just 15 months before dying suddenly in August 1984, aged 43. He had married Olwen Margaret Dowie in 1963, with whom he had four children. In a Legislative Council condolence motion after Atkinson's death, Gordon Masters said that "[no] other person in Parliament typified the country people and the farming community better".
