= Arnold Byfield =

Australian sportsman

Personal information
- Full name: Arnold Stanley Byfield
- Nickname: Bud
- Born: 1 November 1923; Northam, Western Australia
- Died: 4 July 2015 (aged 91); Mandurah, Western Australia
- Height: 178 cm (5 ft 10 in)
- Weight: 82 kg (181 lb)

Playing career^{1}
Years	Club	Games (Goals)
1940–41, 1945, 1947	Claremont	36 (42)
1946	Melbourne	18 (10)
- ^{1} Playing statistics correct to the end of 1947.

Arnold Stanley "Bud" Byfield (1 November 1923 – 4 July 2015) was an Australian sportsman who played first-class cricket in the Sheffield Shield for Western Australia and Australian rules football with Melbourne in the Victorian Football League (VFL) and Claremont in the West Australian Football League (WAFL).

Born in Northam Byfield, known as "Bud", was a member of Claremont's 1940 premiership team, at the age of just 16. In 1946 he joined the Melbourne Football Club in Victoria and played in the 1946 VFL Grand Final, which they lost to Essendon. It was his only season in the league and he returned to Western Australia the following year for one final season at Claremont. He also played 284 games for country football clubs and umpired a further 152 games. Byfield served as president of the West Australian Country Football League from its inception in 1973 to 1991, and in 2004 was inducted into the West Australian Football Hall of Fame.

In six first-class cricket matches, Byfield made 251 runs at 27.88 and took two wickets at 21.50 with his medium pace bowling. He made four appearances in the 1953/54 Sheffield Shield, including one against New South Wales when he dismissed both Ian Craig and Bob Simpson as well as scoring 36 in his first innings. His highest score came against the touring South Africans in 1953 when he scored 38 not out, after an unbeaten 16 in the first innings.
