= John Read (Australian politician) =

Australian politician

Member of the Legislative Assembly of Western Australia
- In office 19 February 1983 – 4 February 1989
- Preceded by: None (new seat)
- Succeeded by: Roger Nicholls
- Constituency: Mandurah

Administrator of the Cocos (Keeling) Islands
- In office 5 December 1992 – 4 December 1994
- Preceded by: Barry T. Cunningham
- Succeeded by: Danny Gillespie

Personal details
- Born: 10 June 1939 (age 86) Boulder, Western Australia
- Party: Labor

John Bell Read (born 10 June 1939) is an Australian former politician who was a Labor Party member of the Legislative Assembly of Western Australia from 1983 to 1989, representing the seat of Mandurah. He later served as the Administrator of the Cocos (Keeling) Islands (an Australian external territory) from 1992 to 1994.

Read was born in Boulder, Western Australia, to Alma (née Clifford) and George Henry Read. He attended Eastern Goldfields High School before going on to study teaching at the University of Western Australia and Claremont Teachers College. Between 1959 and 1983, Read worked as a schoolteacher at various primary schools in Perth and regional Western Australia. From 1970, he was a deputy principal, filling the position at schools in Boulder and Pinjarra. Read entered parliament at the 1983 state election, narrowly defeating Richard Shalders (the sitting Liberal member in the seat of Murray) for the new seat of Mandurah. He increased his majority at the 1986 election, but at the 1989 election was defeated by the Liberal Party's Roger Nicholls. After leaving parliament, Read worked in various consulting and managerial positions for the state and federal governments. From December 1992 to December 1994, he served as Administrator of the Cocos (Keeling) Islands, one of the Australian Indian Ocean Territories. Read married Rosemary Madge Barker in 1960, with whom he five children. One of his sons, Keith John Read, was also a member of parliament.

Parliament of Western Australia
New seat	Member for Mandurah; 1983–1989	Succeeded by Roger Nicholls
