= Electoral district of Whitford =

Former electoral district of Perth, Western Australia

Whitford Western Australia—Legislative Assembly
- State: Western Australia
- Dates current: 1977–1996
- Namesake: Whitford Development Scheme

Whitford was an electoral district of the Legislative Assembly in the Australian state of Western Australia from 1977 to 1996.

== History ==
The district was based in the northern suburbs of Perth and was created first contested at the 1977 state election. The seat was won by Liberal candidate Mick Nanovich, then member for the abolished Toodyay.

Whitford was captured by Labor candidate Pam Beggs, when Labor came to power at the 1983 state election. The seat was lost to Liberal candidate Rob Johnson at the 1993 state election, again coinciding with a change of government. Whitford was abolished ahead of the 1996 state election and Johnson successfully contested the replacement seat of Hillarys.

== Members for Whitford ==
Member	Party	Term
Mick Nanovich	Liberal	1977–1983
Pam Beggs	Labor	1983–1993
Rob Johnson	Liberal	1993–1996
