= Howard Olney =

Australian Aboriginal lands commissioner (1934–2025)

Howard William Olney AM KC (7 October 1934 – 26 October 2025) was an Australian Aboriginal lands commissioner.

Olney was born in Nedlands, Western Australia, on 7 October 1934. He attended Perth Modern School and the University of Western Australia. Olney was Head Boy of Perth Modern School.

Olney was admitted as a solicitor in 1957 and as a magistrate in 1965, being called to the bar in 1974. He became Queen's Counsel in 1980.

The 1970s saw Olney make three unsuccessful attempts to enter parliament, twice at the state level and once at the federal level, contesting the 1971 and 1977 state election for the electorate of Cottesloe and the 1977 federal election for Senate.

From 1980 to 1982, Olney served as a Labor member of the Western Australian Legislative Council. Olney resigned from state parliament, having accepted an invitation from the Liberal Coalition Charles Court Government, to become a Supreme Court Justice.

From 1982 to 1988, he was a justice of the Supreme Court of Western Australia, moving to the Federal Court from 1988 to 2003.

In 1998, Olney wrote the opinion that denied the Yorta Yorta native title claim in Members of the Yorta Yorta Aboriginal Community v Victoria, a verdict which was upheld on multiple appeals.

Between 2005 and 2011 he was an acting judge for the Supreme Court of the Northern Territory. He was appointed Aboriginal Lands Commissioner in 2007.

Olney died on 26 October 2025 at the age of 91.
