= Colin Bell (Australian politician) =

Australian politician

The Honourable Colin Bell

Member of the Legislative Council of Western Australia
- In office 22 May 1983 – 21 May 1989
- Preceded by: Neil McNeill
- Succeeded by: None (seat abolished)
- Constituency: Lower West Province

Personal details
- Born: 18 May 1941 (age 85) Bunbury, Western Australia, Australia
- Party: Liberal

Colin John Bell (born 18 May 1941) is a former Australian politician who was a Liberal Party member of the Legislative Council of Western Australia from 1983 to 1989, representing Lower West Province.

Bell was born in Bunbury, and attended Bunbury Senior High School. A dairy farmer at Capel before entering politics, he served several terms as president of the dairy section of the Primary Industry Association and also on the board of the Australia Dairy Corporation. Bell entered parliament at the 1983 state election, replacing the retiring Neil McNeill in Lower West Province. He served a single six-year term before losing Liberal Party preselection prior to the 1989 election. Bell moved to the eastern states after leaving parliament, living for periods in rural New South Wales, on the Gold Coast (where he owned a limousine company), and in rural Victoria, eventually retiring to Melbourne.
