= Winifred Piesse =

Australian politician

Winifred Margaret Piesse, née Aumann (12 June 1923 – 11 March 2017) was an Australian politician. She was the first woman to represent the Country Party in the Western Australian Legislative Council.

Winifred Margaret Aumann was born in Narre Warren to orchardist Frederick Benjamin Aumann and Marguerite Gertrude Pettingill. She attended local state schools and trained as a nurse – working in Melbourne from 1944 to 1946, when she moved to Western Australia. She married farmer Mervyn Piesse (a son of politician Charles Piesse) in 1947 and moved to live with him at his farm at Wagin. In 1948, she joined the Country Party. Following her husband's death in 1966, she returned to nursing and in 1971, she was elected to Wagin Shire Council. In 1977, she was elected to the Western Australian Legislative Council, serving until she lost her seat in 1983.
