= Des Dans =

Australian politician

The Honourable Des Dans

Member of the Legislative Council of Western Australia
- In office 22 May 1971 – 21 May 1989
- Preceded by: Frederick Lavery
- Succeeded by: None (seat abolished)
- Constituency: South Metropolitan Province

Personal details
- Born: 24 November 1924 Perth, Western Australia, Australia
- Died: 2 January 2014 (aged 89) Hilton, Western Australia, Australia
- Party: Labor

Desmond Keith Dans (24 November 1924 – 2 January 2014) was an Australian trade unionist and politician who was a Labor Party member of the Legislative Council of Western Australia from 1971 to 1989, representing South Metropolitan Province. He served as a minister in the government of Brian Burke.

Dans was born in Perth to Mary (née Frances) and Keith Dans. He moved to Kalgoorlie as a child, where he attended a convent school before going on to the Kalgoorlie School of Mines. Dans enlisted in the Royal Australian Naval Reserve in 1942, and served as a stoker aboard HMAS Hobart. After the war's end, he joined the merchant marine, and became involved with the Seamen's Union. He served as state secretary of the union from 1959 to 1971. Dans was elected to parliament at the 1971 state election. He was made leader of the Labor Party in the Legislative Council in 1976, and elevated to the shadow cabinet in 1978. After Labor's victory at the 1983 state election, Dans was made Minister for Industrial Relations in the new ministry formed by Brian Burke. Following a reshuffle in December 1984, he was instead made Minister for Racing and Gaming and Minister for Tourism. Another reshuffle occurred after the 1986 election, and Dans became Minister for Works and Services, with responsibility for the 1987 America's Cup. He resigned from the ministry just over a month after the event's completion, and left parliament at the 1989 election.

Parliament of Western Australia
Political offices
Preceded by Gordon Masters	Minister for Industrial Relations; 1983–1984	Succeeded by Peter Dowding
Preceded by Brian Burke	Minister for Tourism; 1984–1986	Succeeded by Pam Beggs
New creation	Minister for Racing and Gaming; 1984–1986	Succeeded by Pam Beggs
Preceded by Ken McIver	Minister for Works and Services; 1986–1987	Succeeded by Peter Dowding
