= Eric Charlton =

Australian politician

The Honourable Eric Charlton

Member of the Legislative Council of Western Australia
- In office 17 November 1984 – 21 May 1989
- Preceded by: Gordon Atkinson
- Succeeded by: None (seat abolished)
- Constituency: Central Province
- In office 22 May 1989 – 28 July 1998
- Constituency: Agricultural Region

Personal details
- Born: 17 April 1938 (age 88) Cunderdin, Western Australia
- Party: National

Eric James Charlton (born 17 March 1938) is an Australian former politician.

Educated at Aquinas College, Charlton was elected to the Western Australian Legislative Council in 1984 as a National Party member for Agricultural Region, replacing the deceased MLC Gordon Atkinson. He served in the Council until his resignation in 1998. In 1993 he was appointed Minister for Transport in the Court government, a position he held until his retirement from politics.
