= Phil Lockyer =

Australian politician

Philip Harry Lockyer (born 28 September 1946) is a former Australian politician.

He was born at Mount Magnet to pastoral property manager Thomas Catchlove Lockyer and Florence Lillian Elsdon. He was educated by correspondence before attending Hale School from 1959 to 1962. After receiving his Leaving Certificate, he was an auctioneer at Moora in 1966 before becoming an insurance consultant and property developer. He joined the Liberal party in 1965, and served on Port Hedland Shire Council from 1977 to 1979. In 1980 he was elected to the Western Australian Legislative Council for Lower North Province, transferring to Mining and Pastoral in 1989. He was briefly Shadow Minister for Fisheries in 1992. After his retirement from politics in 1997, he farmed at Boyup Brook before retiring to Albany in 2003.
