= Vic Ferry =

Australian politician, RAAF pilot and RAF bomber pilot

The Honourable Vic Ferry DFC JP

Member of the Legislative Council of Western Australia
- In office 22 May 1965 – 24 July 1987
- Preceded by: James Murray
- Succeeded by: Barry House
- Constituency: South-West Province

Personal details
- Born: 11 January 1922 Albany, Western Australia
- Died: 29 July 2007 (aged 85) Merriwa, Western Australia
- Party: Liberal
- Education: Hale School

Victor Jasper "Vic" Ferry DFC JP (11 January 1922 – 29 July 2007) was an Australian politician and decorated Second World War pilot. He represented the South-West Province in the Western Australian Legislative Council for 22 years (1965–1987) as a member of the Liberal Party, serving as Government Whip and Chairman of Committees. A bomber pilot who flew Handley Page Halifax aircraft with the RAF’s 578 Squadron, Ferry later became State President of the RAAF Association (Western Australia Division).

== Early life ==
Ferry was born on 11 January 1922 in Albany, Western Australia, the son of Mary Eva (née MacLeod) and Roland Jasper Ferry. He was educated at Hale School in Perth.

== Military service ==
Ferry enlisted in the Royal Australian Air Force (RAAF) in 1942 (service number 415936) and qualified as a pilot, reaching the rank of flight lieutenant. He was transferred to the British Royal Air Force (RAF) and flew Handley Page Halifax bombers with No. 578 Squadron RAF in Bomber Command. He also served as a Tactical Flying Instructor and later in Transport Command, seeing active service over Western Europe, North Africa, the Mediterranean, India, and Burma.

In 1944 he was awarded the Distinguished Flying Cross (DFC). Reflecting on his wartime experiences, Ferry later recalled: “When returning from a dangerous operation, particularly in the early light of morning and seeing the twin towers of Selby Abbey in the distance, I knew we were safely back and gave thanks to God for this mercy.”

== Post-war career ==
After the war Ferry resumed his career with the National Bank of Australasia, working as a bank manager. He lived for a time in Queensland before returning to country Western Australia, where he was based in towns including Boddington, Williams, and Manjimup. A member of the Liberal Party since 1949, he held various party offices before entering parliament. He was also appointed a Justice of the Peace (JP).

== Parliamentary career ==
Ferry was elected to the Legislative Council at the 1965 state election, succeeding the retiring James Murray in the South-West Province. He served continuously until July 1987.

Following the Liberals’ victory at the 1974 election, he was appointed Government Whip in the Legislative Council. In 1977 he was promoted to Chairman of Committees, serving in that role until the government’s defeat at the 1983 election. He retired midway through his fourth six-year term.

== Later life and death ==
After leaving parliament, Ferry remained active in veterans’ affairs. He served as State President of the RAAF Association (Western Australia Division) and was involved with the State War Memorial and Torchbearers for Legacy.

He lived in the RAAFA retirement village at Merriwa (Karri Lodge) until his death on 29 July 2007, aged 85.
