= Mark Nevill =

Australian politician (born 1947)

Mark Warriedar Nevill (born 1 July 1947) is an Australian former politician.

He was born in North Fremantle and was a geologist before entering politics. In 1983 he was elected to the Western Australian Legislative Council as a Labor member for South-East Province, moving to Mining and Pastoral in 1989. He was a parliamentary secretary from 1990 to 1993, when he became deputy leader of the opposition in the council, holding a variety of shadow portfolios until he lost the position in 1997. On 23 August 1999 he resigned from the Labor Party to sit as an independent. He lost his seat in 2001.
