= South-East Metropolitan Province =

The South-East Metropolitan Province was a two-member electoral province of the Western Australian Legislative Council, located in metropolitan Perth. It was one of several metropolitan seats created following the enactment of the Constitution Acts Amendment Act (No.2) 1963, and became effective on 22 May 1965. The province, with its mix of safe Labor and Liberal Assembly seats, also produced mixed fortunes for both parties until 1983, when a redistribution turned it into a safe Labor seat and the two sitting Liberal members successfully transferred to the new South Central Metropolitan Province seat.

In 1989, the province was abolished by the Acts Amendment (Electoral Reform) Act 1987, and was split between the East Metropolitan and South Metropolitan five-member regions under the new proportional voting system.

== Geography ==
The province was made up of several complete Legislative Assembly districts, which changed at each distribution.

Redistribution	Period	Electoral districts	Electors	% of State
1963–64	22 May 1965 – 22 May 1968	Beeloo, Canning, South Perth, Victoria Park	41,772	11.27
1966	22 May 1968 – 22 May 1974	Canning, Clontarf, South Perth, Victoria Park	46,715	11.29
1972	22 May 1974 – 22 May 1977	Canning, Clontarf, South Perth, Victoria Park, Welshpool	75,933	13.78
1976	22 May 1977 – 22 May 1983	Clontarf, Gosnells, Murdoch, South Perth	59,792	9.45
1982	22 May 1983 – 22 May 1989	Armadale, Canning, Gosnells, Murdoch	62,749	8.83

== Representation ==
=== Members ===
Member 1	Party	Term	Member 2	Party	Term
Jerry Dolan	Labor	1965–1974	Clive Griffiths^{[1]}	Liberal	1965–1983
Grace Vaughan	Labor	1974–1980	Clive Griffiths^{[1]}	Liberal	1965–1983
Phillip Pendal	Liberal	1980–1983^{[1]}	Clive Griffiths^{[1]}	Liberal	1965–1983
Kay Hallahan	Labor	1983–1989	Bob Hetherington	Labor	1983–1989

^{1} Transferred to South Central Metropolitan Province at the 1983 election.
