= Neil Oliver (politician) =

Australian politician (1933–2019)

The Honourable Neil Oliver ED

Member of the Legislative Council of Western Australia
- In office 22 May 1977 – 21 May 1989
- Preceded by: Charles Abbey
- Succeeded by: None (seat abolished)
- Constituency: West Province

Personal details
- Born: 16 August 1933 Caulfield, Victoria, Australia
- Died: 8 July 2019 (aged 85)
- Party: Liberal

Oscar Neil Blackburne Oliver ED (16 August 1933 – 8 July 2019) was an Australian politician who was a Liberal Party member of the Legislative Council of Western Australia from 1977 to 1989, representing West Province.

Oliver was born in Melbourne to Elizabeth Emily (née Little) and Oscar Oliver. He attended Caulfield Grammar School before going on to the Royal Melbourne Institute of Technology, graduating with a diploma in wool technology. Oliver was an officer cadet of the Australian Army from 1952 to 1954, and then served in the Citizen Military Forces (now the Australian Army Reserve) from 1954 to 1977; reaching the rank of lieutenant-colonel and receiving the Efficiency Decoration. He saw active service twice, in the Malayan Emergency and the Vietnam War. Outside of the military, Oliver worked as a wool broker in Victoria and New Zealand before moving to Western Australia in 1963. He entered parliament at the 1977 state election, and was re-elected at the 1983 election. Oliver attempted to transfer to the Legislative Assembly at the 1989 election, winning Liberal preselection for the seat of Swan Hills. However, he was narrowly defeated by Labor's Gavan Troy (a minister in the Dowding government), who polled 51.5 percent of the two-party-preferred vote.
