= Clive Griffiths (politician) =

Australian politician (1928–2020)

The Honourable Clive Griffiths AO

13th President of the Western Australian Legislative Council
- In office 24 May 1977 – 21 May 1997
- Preceded by: Arthur Griffith
- Succeeded by: George Cash

Member of the Western Australian Legislative Council for South Metropolitan Region
- In office 22 May 1989 – 21 May 1997
- Preceded by: Constituency created
- Succeeded by: Simon O'Brien

Member of the Western Australian Legislative Council for South Central Metropolitan Province
- In office 22 May 1983 – 21 May 1989
- Preceded by: Constituency created
- Succeeded by: Constituency abolished

Member of the Western Australian Legislative Council for South-East Metropolitan Province
- In office 22 May 1965 – 21 May 1983
- Preceded by: Constituency created
- Succeeded by: Bob Hetherington

Personal details
- Born: 20 November 1928 South Perth, Western Australia
- Died: 8 November 2020 (aged 91) Perth, Western Australia
- Party: Liberal
- Spouse(s): Myrtle Holtham (m. 1949, divorced) Norma Marie Paonessa
- Children: 1
- Education: Kalgoorlie School of Mines

Clive Edward Griffiths AO (20 November 1928 – 8 November 2020) was an Australian politician who was the longest serving President of the Western Australian Legislative Council at over 19 years.

== Career ==
He was born in South Perth to mechanical fitter Thomas Edward Griffiths and Dorothy Margaret Beattie. In 1943 he was apprenticed to an electrical fitter at Kalgoorlie, and in 1947 worked for plant engineers at the Public Works Department. He developed his own business from 1953, and although he was a member of the Amalgamated Engineering Union, he joined the Liberal Party in 1956. He served on South Perth City Council from 1962 to 1966, and in 1965 was elected to the Western Australian Legislative Council representing South-East Metropolitan Province. He was elected President of the Council in 1977 and served for twenty years, the longest term of any parliamentary presiding officer in Western Australia. On his retirement from politics in 1997, he was appointed Agent-General for Western Australia, and was also given the Officer of the Order of Australia. Griffiths was also awarded the Centenary Medal in 2003.

Western Australian Legislative Council
Preceded by Constituency created	Member for South-East Metropolitan Province; 1965-1983	Succeeded by Bob Hetherington
Preceded by Constituency created	Member for South Central Metropolitan Province; 1983-1989	Succeeded by Constituency abolished
Preceded by Constituency created	Member for South Metropolitan Region; 1989-1997	Succeeded by Simon O'Brien
Preceded by Arthur Griffith	President of the Western Australian Legislative Council; 1977–1997	Succeeded by George Cash
