= Fred McKenzie (politician) =

Australian trade unionist and politician

The Honourable Fred McKenzie OAM

Member of the Legislative Council of Western Australia
- In office 22 May 1977 – 21 May 1983
- Preceded by: None (new seat)
- Succeeded by: None (seat abolished)
- Constituency: East Metropolitan Province
- In office 22 May 1983 – 21 May 1989
- Preceded by: Joe Berinson
- Succeeded by: None (seat abolished)
- Constituency: North-East Metropolitan Province
- In office 22 May 1989 – 21 May 1993 Serving with Butler, Ferguson, Foss, Hallahan, Tomlinson
- Constituency: East Metropolitan Region

Personal details
- Born: 1 December 1933 West Perth, Western Australia, Australia
- Died: 18 March 2008 (aged 74) Belmont, Western Australia, Australia
- Party: Labor

Fred Evan McKenzie OAM (1 December 1933 – 18 March 2008) was an Australian trade unionist and politician who served as a Labor Party member of the Legislative Council of Western Australia from 1977 to 1993.

McKenzie was born in Perth. After leaving school, he worked as a plasterer for a period and then joined the Midland Railway Company, later transferring to Western Australian Government Railways. From 1970 to 1977, McKenzie was assistant state secretary of the Australian Railways Union. He entered parliament at the 1977 state election, winning election to the new East Metropolitan Province. That seat was abolished at the 1983 election, and McKenzie transferred to North-East Metropolitan Province, replacing Joe Berinson. After the election, he was made government whip in the Legislative Council, a position which he held until his retirement. At the 1989 election, McKenzie was elected to the new four-member East Metropolitan Region. He served one more four-year term before retiring at the 1993 election. McKenzie was awarded the Order of Australia Medal in 2001, for "service to the community in the Belmont area, particularly through support for aged care and charitable organisations". He died in March 2008, aged 74.
