= John Halden =

Australian politician

Personal details
- Born: Stanley John Halden; 21 January 1954 (age 72)

Stanley John Halden (born 21 January 1954), at Fremantle, Western Australia, is a former member of the Western Australian Legislative Council. Although he spent the entirety of his political career in state politics he however did get national notice as a key player in the Easton affair.

Halden was educated in Western Australia and obtained a Bachelor of Arts degree majoring in Social Work. Prior to entering parliament he was employed as a social worker and a counsellor for the Family Court of Australia.

== Parliamentary service ==
Halden contested the 1986 Western Australian State election as a candidate for the Labor Party and was elected to Western Australia's Thirty-second Parliament as the Legislative Council Member for North Metropolitan Province from 22 May 1986, in succession to Peter Henry Wells. He was elected to represent the electoral region of South Metropolitan from 22 May 1989. he was re-elected in 1993 and, for a last time in 1996 (for a term commencing 22 May 1997).

=== Ministerial Appointments ===
Halden served as a Parliamentary Secretary assisting the Ministers for Education, and Parliamentary and Electoral Reform (20 November 1990 – 19 March 1991); and for Productivity and Labour Relations, and Consumer Affairs (from 19 March 1991) 30 April 1990 – 16 February 1993.

=== Shadow Ministerial Appointments ===
Deputy Leader of the Opposition in the Legislative Council 17 February 1993 – 30 November 1993; Leader of the Opposition from 30 November 1993 to 15 October 1996. He was also Shadow Minister for Transport from 17 February 1993 – 7 February 1994; for Education, Employment and Training, and Youth (from 23 January 1995) 7 February 1994 – 18 March 1996; for Employment and Training, Federal Affairs, Finance, and South West 18 March 1996 – 15 October 1996; for Finance 15 January – April 1997. Shadow Minister for Prisons 6 January 1999 to 20 January 2000.

=== Standing Committees ===
Member Standing Committee on Government Agencies September 1989 – January 1993; and Constitutional Affairs and Statutes Revision Committee 25 August 1992 – January 1993. Chairperson Estimates and Financial Operations Committee 10–29 April 1997; additional member to consider the Estimates for 1990–91 and for 1991–92.

=== Select Committees/Royal Commissions ===
Chairman Joint Select Committee on Parole 7 September 1989 – 28 August 1991. Member Select Committee on West Australian Police Service 2 December 1992 – 8 January 1993.

Halden represented the Western Australian Branch of the Commonwealth Parliamentary Association at the 22nd Australasian and Pacific Region Conference, New Zealand, September 1991.

== Easton affair ==
In 1992, Halden tabled a petition in the Legislative Council in the initial public act of the scandal which became known as the Easton affair.

Investigating Halden's role in the affair was part of the brief of the Marks Royal Commission. Halden was charged with perjury before the Commission and was tried and acquitted in December 1998.

== After parliament ==
Halden resigned from his position as MLC for the South Metropolitan District on 20 January 2000 in order to take up the position of Labor Party State Secretary. (Graham Giffard was appointed to the resulting casual vacancy on 7 February 2000.) Halden resigned from his position as State Secretary of the ALP on 27 April 2001.

He later started a lobbying office, representing clients seeking consideration from the government of Western Australia.

In May 2008 he gave an interview to The West Australian which resulted in calls for the revocation of his lobbyist's licence. Halden had indicated that Public Service officers had occasionally been indiscreet and provided him with confidential governmental information. On 3 June 2008, the matter was referred to the Western Australian Corruption and Crime Commission.
