= John Williams (Western Australian politician) =

Australian politician

The Honourable John Williams

Member of the Legislative Council of Western Australia
- In office 22 May 1971 – 21 May 1989 Serving with Ian Medcalf (1971–1986); Max Evans (1986–1989)
- Preceded by: James Hislop
- Succeeded by: none (abolished)
- Constituency: Metropolitan Province

Personal details
- Born: 14 October 1926 Tylorstown, Rhondda, Wales
- Died: 25 February 1997 (aged 70) Duncraig, Western Australia
- Party: Liberal
- Education: University of Wales

Richard John Lloyd Williams (14 October 1926 – 25 February 1997) was an Australian politician who was a Liberal Party member of the Legislative Council of Western Australia from 1971 to 1989.

Williams was born in Tylorstown, Rhondda, Wales. He attended Wolverhampton Grammar School (in Staffordshire, England), and during World War II enlisted in the British Army, serving in Europe and the Middle East. After the war's end, Williams studied teaching at the University of Wales as part of a scheme for ex-servicemen. He was employed as a teacher for a period of time, but left teaching in 1954 to work as a sales manager for the Beecham Group. Williams eventually became the managing director of an American leather goods firm, and lived in the United States for a period. He emigrated to Australia in 1966, and began working as a teacher again. A former member of the Conservative Party in the UK, Williams joined the Liberal Party after arriving in Australia, and at the 1971 state election was elected to the Legislative Council's Metropolitan Province. Appointed deputy chairman of committees after the 1974 election, he would serve a total of three six-year terms before retiring at the 1989 election. Williams died in Perth in 1997, aged 70. His daughter, Liz Behjat, also entered politics, representing North Metropolitan in the Legislative Council.
