= Gordon Masters =

Australian politician

The Honourable Gordon Masters

Member of the Legislative Council of Western Australia
- In office 22 May 1974 – 21 May 1989
- Preceded by: Fred White
- Succeeded by: None (seat abolished)
- Constituency: West Province

Personal details
- Born: 30 August 1931 (age 94) Hemel Hempstead, Hertfordshire, England
- Party: Liberal

Gordon Edgar Masters (born 30 August 1931) is a former Australian politician who was a Liberal Party member of the Legislative Council of Western Australia from 1974 to 1989, representing West Province. He was a minister in the governments of Sir Charles Court and Ray O'Connor.

Masters was born in Hemel Hempstead, Hertfordshire, England, to Winnifred (née Batchelor) and Edgar John Masters. He attended Berkhamsted School and the Hertfordshire Agricultural College, and then farmed locally until 1962, when he emigrated to Australia. Living on the outskirts of Perth, Masters purchased a contracting business, and later diversified into beef farming. He served on the Kalamunda Shire Council from 1969 to 1973, including as president from 1971 to 1973. Masters entered parliament at the 1974 state election, winning his seat from the Country Party. He was appointed government whip in the Legislative Council in 1977, and in 1980 was elevated to the ministry as Minister for Fisheries and Wildlife and Minister for Conservation and the Environment. When Ray O'Connor replaced Sir Charles Court as premier in January 1982, Masters was instead made Minister for Immigration and Minister for Labour and Industry. He held those positions until the government's defeat at the 1983 state election, and remained in the shadow cabinet until his retirement at the 1989 election, serving under three different leaders of the opposition (Ray O'Connor, Bill Hassell, and Barry MacKinnon).

Parliament of Western Australia
Political offices
Preceded by David Wordsworth	Minister for Fisheries and Wildlife; 1980–1982	Succeeded by Dick Old
Preceded by David Wordsworth	Minister for Conservation and the Environment; 1980–1982	Succeeded by Ian Laurance
Preceded by Ray O'Connor	Minister for Labour and Industry; 1982–1983	Succeeded by Des Dans
Preceded by Ray O'Connor	Minister for Immigration; 1982–1983	Succeeded by Ron Davies
