= Bob Hetherington =

Australian politician and political scientist

Bob Hetherington OAM
- Born: Robert Hetherington; 8 January 1923; Mount Gambier, South Australia
- Died: 30 January 2015 (aged 92); Perth, Western Australia
- Occupation(s): Politician, political scientist

Robert "Bob" Hetherington OAM (8 January 1923 – 30 January 2015) was an Australian politician, political scientist and mental health advocate.

== Career ==
Hetherington finished high school at age 16. He worked in Adelaide before enlisting in the 2nd AIF in 1942, serving in Australia and Papua New Guinea. He was discharged in 1946 after working with international prisoners of war in Manilla. He enrolled in the University of Adelaide, graduating in 1950 with an honours degree in history and political science and became a schoolteacher. In 1957 he was appointed tutor in politics at the University of Adelaide and in 1967 moved to the University of Western Australia as lecturer in politics until 1977.

A Labor party member, Hetherington sought pre-selection for the Senate in 1974 and again in 1975, both times failing to be elected because of his position on the ticket.

He then was elected a Labor member of the Western Australian Legislative Council from 1977 to 1989, firstly representing the East Metropolitan Province and then the South-East Metropolitan Province. While in parliament he advocated for mental health services and women's refuges for those suffering domestic violence. In 1987 he introduced a private member's bill into the council to legalise homosexuality, which was narrowly defeated.

After politics, he continued his support for people with mental illness, becoming first a committee member and later president of the Schizophrenia Fellowship in Western Australia. He also returned to tutoring at the University of Western Australia and Murdoch University, where he was appointed to its senate.

Hetherington died on 30 January 2015 in Perth. He was survived by his wife, two sons and a daughter.
