= Lower West Province =

Former electoral province of Western Australia

The Lower West Province was a two-member electoral province of the Western Australian Legislative Council, located in the Peel and South West region of the state. It was one of several rural seats created following the enactment of the Constitution Acts Amendment Act (No.2) 1963, and became effective on 22 May 1965. It was consistently a safe seat for the Liberal Party who were able to maintain both seats comfortably.

In 1989, the province was abolished by the Acts Amendment (Electoral Reform) Act 1987, and was integrated into the South West and East Metropolitan regions under the new proportional voting system.

== Geography ==
The province was made up of several complete Legislative Assembly districts, which changed at each distribution.

Redistribution	Period	Electoral districts	Electors	% of State
1963–64	22 May 1965 – 22 May 1968	Bunbury, Murray, Wellington	16,433	4.56
1966	22 May 1968 – 22 May 1974	Bunbury, Murray, Wellington	17,433	4.22
1972	22 May 1974 – 22 May 1977	Dale, Murray, Rockingham	21,566	3.92
1976	22 May 1977 – 22 May 1983	Dale, Murray, Rockingham	23,200	3.67
1982	22 May 1983 – 22 May 1989	Dale, Mandurah, Murray-Wellington	25,493	3.59

== Representation ==
=== Members ===
Member 1	Party	Term	Member 2	Party	Term
Neil McNeill	Liberal	1965–1983	Graham MacKinnon	Liberal	1965–1974
Neil McNeill	Liberal	1965–1983	Ian Pratt	Liberal	1974–1986
Colin Bell	Liberal	1983–1989	Beryl Jones	Labor	1986–1989
