= South Metropolitan Province =

The South Metropolitan Province was a two-member electoral province of the Western Australian Legislative Council, located in metropolitan Perth. It was one of several metropolitan seats created following the enactment of the Constitution Acts Amendment Act (No.2) 1963, and became effective on 22 May 1965. The province was very safe for the Labor Party, which held most or all of the component Assembly seats.

In 1989, the province was abolished by the Acts Amendment (Electoral Reform) Act 1987, and with two others became part of the South Metropolitan Region under the new proportional voting system.

== Geography ==
The province was made up of several complete Legislative Assembly districts, which changed at each distribution.

| Redistribution | Period | Electoral districts | Electors | % of State |
|---|---|---|---|---|
| 1963–64 | 22 May 1965 – 22 May 1968 | Cockburn, East Melville, Fremantle, Melville | 41,082 | 11.09 |
| 1966 | 22 May 1968 – 22 May 1974 | Cockburn, East Melville, Fremantle, Melville | 46,073 | 11.14 |
| 1972 | 22 May 1974 – 22 May 1977 | Cockburn, East Melville, Fremantle, Melville | 63,251 | 11.48 |
| 1976 | 22 May 1977 – 22 May 1983 | Cockburn, East Melville, Fremantle, Melville | 63,455 | 10.02 |
| 1982 | 22 May 1983 – 22 May 1989 | Cockburn, Fremantle, Melville, Rockingham | 65,508 | 9.22 |

== Representation ==
=== Members ===
| Member 1 | Party | Term | Member 2 | Party | Term |
|---|---|---|---|---|---|
| Ron Thompson | Labor | 1965–1980 | Frederick Lavery | Labor | 1965–1971 |
| Ron Thompson | Labor | 1965–1980 | Des Dans | Labor | 1971–1989 |
| Howard Olney^{[1]} | Labor | 1980–1981 | Des Dans | Labor | 1971–1989 |
| Garry Kelly | Labor | 1982–1989 | Des Dans | Labor | 1971–1989 |

^{1} On 16 December 1981, Labor member Howard Olney resigned in order to be appointed to the Supreme Court of Western Australia. At the resulting by-election on 13 March 1982, Labor candidate Garry Kelly was elected.
