= North Metropolitan Province =

The North Metropolitan Province was a two-member electoral province of the Western Australian Legislative Council, located in metropolitan Perth. It was one of several metropolitan seats created following the enactment of the Constitution Acts Amendment Act (No.2) 1963, and became effective on 22 May 1965. At each election, held every three years, one of the two seats was vacated, and the trend in North Metropolitan reflected statewide trends and swings rather than being safe for either of the major parties.

In 1989, the province was abolished by the Acts Amendment (Electoral Reform) Act 1987, and with two others became part of the North Metropolitan Region under the new proportional voting system.

== Geography ==
The province was made up of several complete Legislative Assembly districts, which changed at each distribution.

Redistribution	Period	Electoral districts	Electors	% of State
1963–64	22 May 1965 – 22 May 1968	Balcatta, Karrinyup, Mount Hawthorn, Wembley	41,328	11.15
1966	22 May 1968 – 22 May 1974	Balcatta, Karrinyup, Mount Hawthorn, Mount Lawley, Wembley	55,919	13.52
1972	22 May 1974 – 22 May 1977	Balga, Karrinyup, Mount Hawthorn, Mount Lawley, Scarborough	76,507	13.89
1976	22 May 1977 – 22 May 1983	Balcatta, Karrinyup, Mount Hawthorn, Scarborough, Whitford	77,524	12.34
1982	22 May 1983 – 22 May 1989	Joondalup, Karrinyup, Scarborough, Whitford	64,044	9.01

== Representation ==
=== Members ===
Member 1	Party	Term	Member 2	Party	Term
Arthur Griffith	Liberal	1965–1977	Herbert R. Robinson	Liberal	1965–1968
Arthur Griffith	Liberal	1965–1977	Roy Claughton	Labor	1968–1980
Bob Pike	Liberal	1977–1983	Roy Claughton	Labor	1968–1980
Bob Pike	Liberal	1977–1983	Peter Wells	Liberal	1980–1986
Graham Edwards	Labor	1983–1989	Peter Wells	Liberal	1980–1986
Graham Edwards	Labor	1983–1989	John Halden	Labor	1986–1989
