= Phillip Pendal =

Australian politician

Phillip George Pendal (4 February 1947 – 27 May 2008) was a Liberal and later Independent Western Australian politician, an opponent of abortion rights, and a historian.

== Early life ==
Born in Bunbury, Western Australia, Phillip Pendal was raised and schooled as a Catholic and his strong Catholic principles continued to influence him for the rest of his life, culminating in him being honoured by the Pope John Paul II with the Holy Cross Pro Ecclesia et Pontifice (Cross for the Church and the Pontiff) on 14 April 2005. He was a student at Xavier College in East Victoria Park (now Ursula Frayne Catholic College) in his senior school years.

Prior to his career in politics, Pendal worked as a print journalist from 1965 until 1975, winning a cadetship with WA Newspapers that saw him writing for Bunbury's South Western Times from 1966 until 1968, when he was made editor of the Manjimup-Warren Times. From 1969 until 1975, he worked at the Daily News, an evening newspaper in Perth, where he rose to prominence in his coverage of state politics as State Political Roundsman.

Pendal was married to Maxine Mayrhofer from 1969 until his death, and the couple raised three children: Sasha, Simon and Narisha.

== Parliamentary career ==
His coverage of politics led to Pendal being employed as a press secretary for Sir Charles Court and other ministers in the Court Liberal Government, and from 1971 to 1995 he was an active member of the Liberal Party. In 1980 he was elected to the Legislative Council to represent the South-East metropolitan province, and from 1983 until 1993 he was a shadow minister and opposition spokesman in a number of portfolios, most prominently the Environment portfolio. His performance as shadow environment minister was widely praised and considered by many to be an important factor in the Liberal party's victory in the 1993 state election, and some analysts believe that his continuation in that portfolio in the Court government might have averted the government's defeat in the 2001 election.

Although he was elected to the Legislative Assembly as the member for South Perth in 1993, he was not appointed to the front bench of the new government, and on 30 March 1995 he resigned from the Liberal Party over concerns relating to branch-stacking, continuing his parliamentary career as the Independent member for South Perth until his retirement in 2005.

Pendal was a prominent opponent of legal abortion care during his parliamentary career, most notably in his unofficial leadership of those opposed to the divisive 1998 debate over the decriminalization of abortion. He was also a strong opponent of the death penalty, and his crossing of the floor to support its abolition in 1984 was instrumental to the bill's passage.

== Later life ==
Pendal was also a published author and historian, who wrote a number of works concerning the history of Western Australia and in particular the history of the Parliament of Western Australia, along with a biography of former WA premier Albert Hawke. At the time of his death, he had finished another work awaiting publication, a history of Catholic education in Western Australia due to be published in September 2008.

Pendal died of a brain aneurysm in 2008, and was widely praised by his former colleagues from both sides of parliament as a passionate and eloquent parliamentarian of great personal integrity.

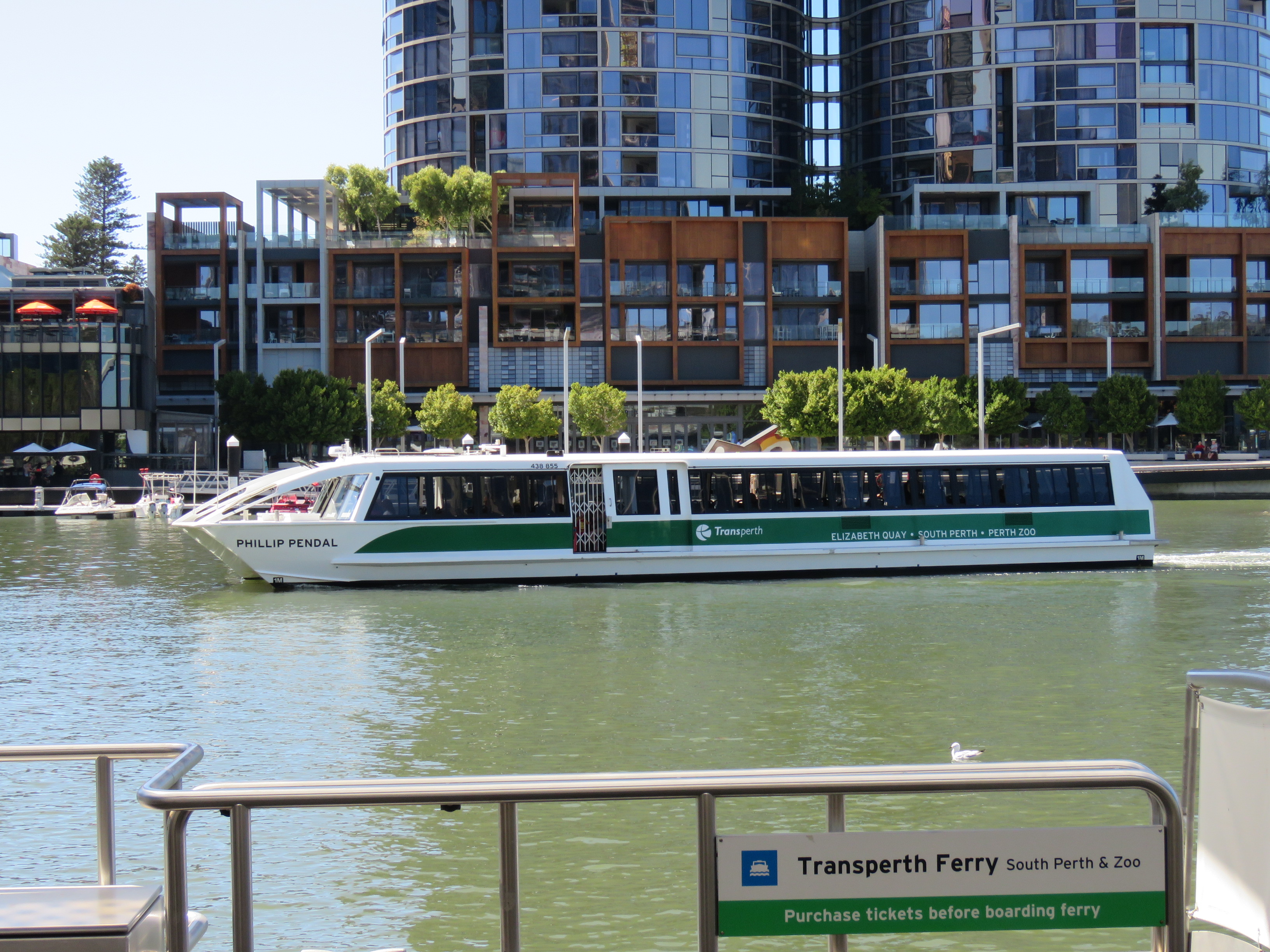
The ferry named after Phillip Pendal at Elizabeth Quay in 2023

== Legacy ==
In 2009, Transperth named a ferry the Phillip Pendal.

== Bibliography ==
- ‘’House to House: the Story of Western Australia’s Government and Parliament Houses over 175 years’’, (Perth: Parliament of Western Australia: 2004) ISBN 1-920830-34-0, with David Black
- ‘’Hands That Heal: the Story of a Unique Australian: the Community Owned South Perth Hospital’’, (Inglewood: Victor Publishing, 2006) ISBN 0-9577829-6-9
- ‘’Parliament, Mirror of the People?: Members of the Parliament of Western Australia 1890-2007’’, (Perth: Parliament of Western Australia: 2007) ISBN 978-1-921355-17-2, with David Black and Harry Phillips
- ‘’Continuity in Change : The Journey of Catholic Education in Western Australia from 1843 to 2008’’, (Perth: Inglewood: Victor Publishing, 2008) ISBN 978-0-9577829-9-0
- ‘’Royal Perth: A History of Golf in Australia's West from 1895 to 2008’’, (Perth: Inglewood: Victor Publishing, 2008) ISBN 978-0-9577829-7-6
