= Electoral districts of Western Australia =

Electorates for the Western Australian Legislative Assembly

The Western Australian Legislative Assembly is elected from 59 single-member electoral districts. These districts are often referred to as electorates or seats.

The Electoral Distribution Act 1947 requires regular review of electoral boundaries, in order to keep the relative size of electorates within certain limits. Electoral boundaries are determined by the Western Australian Electoral Commission. Electoral districts are subdivisions of electoral regions for the Legislative Council and have approximately an equal number of electors. The last electoral redistribution was completed in December 2023 and was first applied in the 2025 Western Australia election.

== List of electoral districts ==
- Albany
- Armadale
- Balcatta
- Baldivis
- Bassendean
- Bateman
- Belmont
- Bibra Lake
- Bicton
- Bunbury
- Butler
- Cannington
- Carine
- Central Wheatbelt
- Churchlands
- Cockburn
- Collie-Preston
- Cottesloe
- Darling Range
- Dawesville
- Forrestfield
- Fremantle
- Geraldton
- Girrawheen
- Hillarys
- Jandakot
- Joondalup
- Kalamunda
- Kalgoorlie
- Kimberley
- Kingsley
- Kwinana
- Landsdale
- Mandurah
- Maylands
- Midland
- Mid-West
- Mindarie
- Morley
- Mount Lawley
- Murray-Wellington
- Nedlands
- Oakford
- Perth
- Pilbara
- Riverton
- Rockingham
- Roe
- Scarborough
- Secret Harbour
- South Perth
- Southern River
- Swan Hills
- Thornlie
- Vasse
- Victoria Park
- Wanneroo
- Warren-Blackwood
- West Swan

== See also ==
- Electoral regions of Western Australia
