= 1983 Western Australian state election =

- 19 February 1983

All 57 seats in the Western Australian Legislative Assembly and 18 (of the 34) seats to the Western Australian Legislative Council 29 Assembly seats were needed for a majority
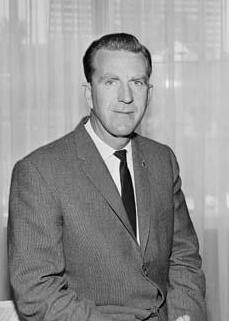
	First party	Second party	Third party
	ALP		NAT
Leader	Brian Burke	Ray O'Connor	Hendy Cowan
Party	Labor	Liberal/NCP coalition	National
Leader since	18 September 1981	25 January 1982	1979
Leader's seat	Balga	Mount Lawley	Merredin
Last election	23 seats	29 seats	3 seats
Seats won	32	23	2
Seat change	▲9	▼6	▼1
Popular vote	342,536	278,994	10,767
Percentage	53.16%	43.30%	1.67%
Swing	▲7.21	▼4.75	▼1.29
TPP	53.74%	46.26%
TPP swing	▲4.71	▼4.71
Premier before election
Ray O'Connor
Liberal/NCP coalition
Elected Premier
Brian Burke
Labor

Elections were held in the state of Western Australia on 19 February 1983 to elect all 57 members to the Legislative Assembly and 18 members to the 34-seat Legislative Council.

The three-term Liberal-National Country coalition government, led by Premier Ray O'Connor since 25 January 1982 (after the retirement of Sir Charles Court) was defeated by the Labor Party, led by Opposition Leader Brian Burke since 10 September 1981.

== Results ==
=== Legislative Assembly ===
Western Australian state election, 19 February 1983 Legislative Assembly << 1980–1986 >>
Enrolled voters	744,986^{[1]}				
Votes cast	663,153		Turnout	87.93%	+2.66%
Informal votes	18,799		Informal	2.83%	–0.69%
Summary of votes by party
Party	Primary votes	%	Swing	Seats	Change
Labor	342,536	53.16%	+7.21%	32	+ 9
Liberal	256,846	39.86%	–3.89%	20	– 6
National Country^{[2]}	22,148	3.44%	–0.86%	3	± 0
National^{[2]}	10,767	1.67%	–1.29%	2	– 1
Democrats	5,178	0.80%	–1.16%	0	± 0
Socialist	905	0.14%	–0.12%	0	± 0
Other parties	5,974	0.93%	+0.75%	0	± 0
Independent	3,229	0.50%	–0.15%	0	± 0
Total	644,354			57	
Two-party-preferred
Labor	350,996	53.74%	+4.71%		
Liberal/NCP	302,100	46.26%	–4.71%		

Notes:

^{1} 754,226 electors were enrolled to vote at the election, but one seat, Narrogin, held by the National Country Party's Peter Jones and representing 9,239 electors, was held unopposed.
^{2} The National Country Party (NCP) and the National Party (NP) were two separate parties, the former in coalition with the Liberal Party, the latter an independent party which had split from the NCP on 10 August 1978.

=== Legislative Council ===
Western Australian state election, 19 February 1983 Legislative Council
Enrolled voters	754,225				
Votes cast	671,102		Turnout	88.98%	+0.57%
Informal votes	24,962		Informal	3.72%	–0.66%
Summary of votes by party
Party	Primary votes	%	Swing	Seats won	Seats held
Labor	327,129	50.63%	+5.85%	7	13
Liberal	268,626	41.57%	–5.93%	9	19
National Country^{[2]}	20,553	3.18%	–0.64%	0	1
National^{[2]}	20,336	3.15%	–0.28%	1	1
Democrats	9,356	1.45%	+1.45%	0	0
Other parties	0	0.00%	–0.47%	0	0
Total	646,140			17	34
Two-party-preferred
Labor	341,236	52.81%	+5.17%		
Liberal/NCP	304,904	47.19%	–5.17%		

== Seats changing parties ==
Seat	Pre-1983			Swing	Post-1983		
Seat	Party	Member	Margin	Swing	Margin	Member	Party
Bunbury	Liberal	John Sibson	1.3	4.0	2.7	Phil Smith	Labor
Mandurah	Liberal	notional	N/A	N/A	0.3	John Read	Labor
Mount Marshall	National Country	Ray McPharlin	10.8*	16.5	5.7**	Bill McNee	Liberal
Mundaring	Liberal	Tom Herzfeld	3.5	3.6	0.1	Gavan Troy	Labor
Pilbara	Liberal	Brian Sodeman	1.6	19.1	17.5	Pam Buchanan	Labor
Scarborough	Liberal	Ray Young	6.2	11.9	5.7	Graham Burkett	Labor
Whitford	Liberal	Mick Nanovich	8.3	16.0	7.7	Pam Beggs	Labor

- Members listed in italics did not contest their seat at this election.
- * figure is vs. Liberal
- ** figure is vs. National (NP)

== Post-election pendulum ==
Labor seats (32)
Marginal
Mundaring	Gavan Troy	ALP	0.1%
Mandurah	John Read	ALP	0.3%
Bunbury	Phil Smith	ALP	2.7%
Scarborough	Graham Burkett	ALP	5.7%
Fairly safe
Joondalup	Jackie Watkins	ALP	6.7%
Mitchell	David Smith	ALP	6.9%
Whitford	Pam Beggs	ALP	7.7%
Esperance-Dundas	Julian Grill	ALP	8.3%
Avon	Ken McIver	ALP	8.4%
Safe
Nollamara	Keith Wilson	ALP	11.3%
Balcatta	Ron Bertram	ALP	13.0%
Gosnells	Yvonne Henderson	ALP	13.1%
Geraldton	Jeff Carr	ALP	13.1%
Warren	David Evans	ALP	13.4%
Armadale	Bob Pearce	ALP	13.6%
Helena	Gordon Hill	ALP	13.7%
Welshpool	Colin Jamieson	ALP	14.8%
Maylands	John Harman	ALP	14.9%
Canning	Tom Bateman	ALP	15.6%
Collie	Tom Jones	ALP	15.6%
Kimberley	Ernie Bridge	ALP	15.9%
Victoria Park	Ron Davies	ALP	17.1%
Pilbara	Pam Buchanan	ALP	17.5%
Perth	Terry Burke	ALP	17.8%
Fremantle	David Parker	ALP	19.1%
Rockingham	Mike Barnett	ALP	19.7%
Ascot	Mal Bryce	ALP	19.9%
Morley-Swan	Arthur Tonkin	ALP	20.9%
Melville	Barry Hodge	ALP	21.2%
Kalgoorlie	Ian Taylor	ALP	24.1%
Cockburn	Don Taylor	ALP	28.6%
Balga	Brian Burke	ALP	29.0%

Liberal/NCP seats (23)
Marginal
Dale	Cyril Rushton	LIB	0.06%
Murchison-Eyre	Peter Coyne	LIB	1.3%
Subiaco	Tom Dadour	LIB	1.6%
Albany	Leon Watt	LIB	2.3%
Mount Lawley	Ray O'Connor	LIB	3.4%
Murdoch	Barry MacKinnon	LIB	4.0%
Clontarf	Tony Williams	LIB	4.2%
South Perth	Bill Grayden	LIB	4.5%
Mount Marshall	Bill McNee	LIB	5.7% v NAT
Karrinyup	Jim Clarko	LIB	5.9%
Fairly safe
Cottesloe	Bill Hassell	LIB	6.3%
Darling Range	George Spriggs	LIB	6.6%
Murray-Wellington	John Bradshaw	LIB	8.2%
East Melville	Anthony Trethowan	LIB	8.9%
Floreat	Andrew Mensaros	LIB	9.6%
Safe
Kalamunda	Ian Thompson	LIB	10.1%
Gascoyne	Ian Laurance	LIB	11.8%
Moore	Bert Crane	NCP	13.3% v LIB
Nedlands	Richard Court	LIB	14.1%
Vasse	Barry Blaikie	LIB	14.2%
Greenough	Reg Tubby	LIB	21.2%
Katanning-Roe	Dick Old	NCP	32.1%
Narrogin	Peter Jones	NCP	Unopp
National seats (2)
Stirling	Matt Stephens	NAT	6.1% v LIB
Merredin	Hendy Cowan	NAT	15.0% v NCP

== Opinion polling ==
Morgan Gallop opinion poll results
Date	Primary vote		Leader's approval rating	
Date	Labor	Liberal-NCP	Labor	Liberal
February–April 1981	44	48	39	47
June–August 1981	49	42	37	51
18 September 1981	Brian Burke replaces Ron Davies as leader of the Labor Party			
September–November 1981	51	39	33	47
December 1981–January 1982	46	46	39	63
21 January 1982	Ray O'Connor replaces Charles Court as leader of the Liberal Party			
February–April 1982	51	42	52	50
May–June 1982	49	44	54	59
July–August 1982	51	44	56	63
September–October 1982	48	42	54	62
November–December 1982	47	48	58	61
19 February 1983 election	53.8	44.2	—N/a	—N/a

== See also ==
- Candidates of the 1983 Western Australian state election
- Members of the Western Australian Legislative Assembly, 1980–1983
- Members of the Western Australian Legislative Assembly, 1983–1986
