= Candidates of the 1980 Western Australian state election =

The 1980 Western Australian state election was held on 23 February 1980.

== Retiring Members ==
=== Labor ===
- Tom Evans MLA (Kalgoorlie)
- John Troy MLA (Fremantle)
- Don Cooley MLC (North-East Metropolitan)
- Claude Stubbs MLC (South-East)

=== Liberal ===
- Des O'Neil MLA (East Melville)
- George Berry MLC (Lower North)

=== Independent ===
- Ron Thompson MLC (South Metropolitan) – elected as Labor

== Legislative Assembly ==
Sitting members are shown in bold text. Successful candidates are highlighted in the relevant colour. Where there is possible confusion, an asterisk (*) is also used.

Electorate	Held by	Labor candidate	Coalition candidate	Other candidates
Albany	Liberal	Ronald Bowe	**Leon Watt** (Lib)	Douglas Joyce (Prog)
Ascot	Labor	**Mal Bryce**	Alam Richardson (Lib)	
Avon	Labor	**Ken McIver**	Allan Baxter (NCP); Julian Stanwix (Lib)	
Balcatta	Labor	**Brian Burke**	John Bamford (Lib)	
Bunbury	Liberal	Phil Smith	**John Sibson** (Lib)	Donald Stewart (Dem)
Canning	Labor	**Tom Bateman**	Jack Courtis (Lib)	
Clontarf	Liberal	Robert Holland	**Tony Williams** (Lib)	
Cockburn	Labor	**Don Taylor**	Herbert Hancock (Lib)	
Collie	Labor	**Tom Jones**		
Cottesloe	Liberal	Richard Grounds	**Bill Hassell** (Lib)	
Dale	Liberal	David Carlson	**Cyril Rushton** (Lib)	
Darling Range	Liberal	William O'Brien	**George Spriggs** (Lib)	Eric Synnerdahl (Dem)
Dianella	Labor	**Keith Wilson**	Graham Pittaway (Lib)	
East Melville	Liberal		Anthony Trethowan (Lib)	
Floreat	Liberal	Dorothy Anderson	**Andrew Mensaros** (Lib)	Desmond Wooding (Dem)
Fremantle	Labor	David Parker	James Miorada (Lib)	Angelo Lopez (SLL); Christopher Mayhew (Ind); Victor Slater (CPA)
Gascoyne	Liberal	Robert Price	**Ian Laurance** (Lib)	Robert Phillips (Ind)
Geraldton	Labor	**Jeff Carr**	Joseph Ricupero (Lib)	Paul Galbraith (Prog)
Gosnells	Labor	**Bob Pearce**	Nancye Jones (Lib)	Gordon Stapp (Ind)
Greenough	Liberal	Edward Clarkson	Gordon Garratt (NCP); **Reg Tubby*** (Lib)	Michael Bell (Nat); William Thomson (Prog)
Kalamunda	Liberal	Kay Hallahan	**Ian Thompson** (Lib)	Elizabeth Capill (Dem)
Kalgoorlie	Labor	Ted Evans	Douglas Daws (Lib)	
Karrinyup	Liberal	Evan McKenzie	**Jim Clarko** (Lib)	
Katanning	NCP		**Dick Old** (NCP)	Arnold Bilney (Nat)
Kimberley	Liberal	Ernie Bridge	**Alan Ridge** (Lib)	Josephine Boyle (Ind)
Maylands	Labor	**John Harman**	John Urquhart (Lib)	
Melville	Labor	**Barry Hodge**	Geoffrey Baldock (Lib)	James Dunlevy (Dem)
Merredin	NCP		Norman Oates (Lib); Edith Towers (NCP)	**Hendy Cowan** (Nat)
Moore	NCP	John Halden	**Bert Crane*** (NCP); Michael Flanagan (Lib)	John Trewin (Nat)
Morley	Labor	**Arthur Tonkin**	Kevin Egan (Lib)	
Mount Hawthorn	Labor	**Ron Bertram**	Anne Klatt (Lib)	
Mount Lawley	Liberal	Leslie Whittle	**Ray O'Connor** (Lib)	Ronald Downie (Dem)
Mount Marshall	NCP		Joan Hardwick (NCP); Bill McNee (Lib)	**Ray McPharlin** (Nat)
Mundaring	Liberal	William Bartholomaeus	**Tom Herzfeld*** (Lib); Michael Johnson (NCP)	
Murchison-Eyre	Liberal	Mark Nevill	**Peter Coyne** (Lib)	Kevin Seivwright (Nat)
Murdoch	Liberal	Garry Kelly	**Barry MacKinnon** (Lib)	Richard Jeffreys (Dem)
Murray	Liberal	David King	**Richard Shalders** (Lib)	
Narrogin	NCP	Malcolm Turner	**Peter Jones** (NCP)	
Nedlands	Liberal	Peter O'Donoghue	**Sir Charles Court** (Lib)	James Croasdale (Ind)
Perth	Labor	**Terry Burke**	Bernard Smith (Lib)	James Connolly (Ind)
Pilbara	Liberal	Gilbert Barr	**Brian Sodeman** (Lib)	Blair Nancarrow (Dem)
Rockhingham	Labor	**Mike Barnett**	Edward Smeding (Lib)	
Roe	Liberal	Kevin Moore	**Geoff Grewar*** (Lib); John Paterson (NCP)	Owen Kirwan (Nat)
Scarborough	Liberal	Malcolm Hall	**Ray Young** (Lib)	
South Perth	Liberal	Malcolm Trudgen	**Bill Grayden** (Lib)	Kevin Trent (Dem)
Stirling	NCP		Gary Pollett (Lib); Peter Squire (NCP)	**Matt Stephens** (Nat)
Subiaco	Liberal	Marcelle Anderson	**Tom Dadour** (Lib)	
Swan	Labor	**Jack Skidmore**	John George (Lib); Howard Wilcoxson (NCP)	Howard Bowra (Ind)
Vasse	Liberal	Barbara Taylor	**Barry Blaikie** (Lib)	Alfred Bussell (Ind)
Victoria Park	Labor	**Ron Davies**	Michael Smith (Lib)	Peter Holloway (SWP)
Warren	Labor	**David Evans**	Graham Happ (Lib)	
Wellington	Liberal	Patricia Rutherford	**June Craig** (Lib)	
Welshpool	Labor	**Colin Jamieson**	Francesco Piccolo (Lib)	
Whitford	Liberal	Nick Griffiths	**Mick Nanovich** (Lib)	Harvard Barclay (Dem)
Yilgarn-Dundas	Labor	**Julian Grill**	James Mazza (Lib)	

== Legislative Council ==
Sitting members are shown in bold text. Successful candidates are highlighted in the relevant colour. Where there is possible confusion, an asterisk (*) is also used.

Province	Held by	Labor candidate	Coalition candidate	Other candidates
Central	NCP	Pamela Doust	Gordon Atkinson (Lib); **Harry Gayfer*** (NCP)	Murray Anderson (Nat)
East Metropolitan	Labor	**Bob Hetherington**	Brian Brand (Lib)	
Lower Central	Liberal	Douglas Simcock	**Sandy Lewis*** (Lib); Robert Reid (NCP)	Robert Wardell-Johnson (Nat)
Lower North	Liberal	Lino Paggi	Phil Lockyer (Lib)	Robert Crombie (Nat)
Lower West	Liberal	Richard Savage	**Ian Pratt** (Lib)	John Trewick (Prog)
Metropolitan	Liberal	Gordon Payne	**Ian Medcalf** (Lib)	
North	Liberal	Peter Dowding	**John Tozer** (Lib)	
North Metropolitan	Labor	**Roy Claughton**	Peter Wells (Lib)	
North-East Metropolitan	Labor	Joe Berinson	Wouterina Klein (Lib)	
South	Liberal		**Thomas Knight*** (Lib); Robert Russell (NCP)	Robert Whalley (Nat)
South Metropolitan	Labor	Howard Olney	John Buhagiar (Lib)	
South-East	Labor	Jim Brown	Irvin Muir (Lib)	
South-East Metropolitan	Labor	**Grace Vaughan**	Phillip Pendal (Lib)	
South West	Liberal	Pandora Nikola	**Graham MacKinnon** (Lib)	
Upper West	Liberal		**Margaret McAleer*** (Lib); Robert Michael (NCP)	Sue Shields (Nat)
West	Liberal	Jan Kaub	**Gordon Masters** (Lib)	

== See also ==
- Members of the Western Australian Legislative Assembly, 1977–1980
- Members of the Western Australian Legislative Assembly, 1980–1983
- Members of the Western Australian Legislative Council, 1977–1980
- Members of the Western Australian Legislative Council, 1980–1983
- 1980 Western Australian state election
