= Candidates of the 1974 Western Australian state election =

The 1974 Western Australian state election was held on 30 March 1974.

== Retiring Members ==
=== Labor ===
- John Brady MLA (Swan)
- Bill Sewell MLA (Geraldton)
- Stan Lapham MLA (Karrinyup)
- Daniel Norton MLA (Gascoyne)
- Bill Willesee MLC (North-East Metropolitan)
- Jerry Dolan MLC (South-East Metropolitan)

=== Liberal ===
- Iven Manning MLA (Wellington)
- Ewart Runciman MLA (Murray)
- Sandy Lewis MLA (Blackwood)
- Francis Willmott MLC (South-West)

=== National Alliance ===
- Crawford Nalder MLA (Katanning)
- William Manning MLA (Narrogin)
- Edgar Lewis MLA (Moore)
- Harry Gayfer MLA (Avon)
- Les Logan MLC (Upper West)
- Jack Thomson MLC (South)
- Leslie Diver MLC (Central)
- Sydney Thompson MLC (Lower Central)

== Legislative Assembly ==
Sitting members are shown in bold text. Successful candidates are highlighted in the relevant colour. Where there is possible confusion, an asterisk (*) is also used.

Electorate	Held by	Labor candidate	Liberal candidate	Alliance candidate	Other candidates
Albany	Labor	**Wyndham Cook**	Leon Watt	Leslie Dean	
Ascot	Labor	**Mal Bryce**	Robert Carter		
Avon	Labor	**Ken McIver**	Owen Bloomfield	Albert Llewellyn	
Balga	Labor	**Brian Burke**	Neil Beck	Kenneth Austin	Ralph Brockman (Ind)
Boulder-Dundas	Labor	**Tom Hartrey**	Eric Bingley	John Madden	
Bunbury	Liberal	Robert Wells	**John Sibson**		
Canning	Labor	**Tom Bateman**	John Sinclair	Paul Clune	Robert Russell-Brown (Aust)
Clontarf	Labor	**Donald May**	Tony Williams	Anne-Marie Loney	
Cockburn	Labor	**Don Taylor**	Lloyd Read-Brain	Clifford Webb	
Collie	Labor	**Tom Jones**	Brian Menzies	Hilda Turnbull	
Cottesloe	Liberal	Graham Rattigan	**Ross Hutchinson**	Oldham Prestage	Charles Pierce (Aust)
Dale	Liberal	Reginald Ewers	**Cyril Rushton**	June Fitzgerald	
East Melville	Liberal	Percy Johnson	**Des O'Neil**	Rosemary Taboni	
Floreat	Liberal	Peter Coyle	**Andrew Mensaros**	Peter McGowan	
Fremantle	Labor	**Harry Fletcher**	Michael Coakley	Peter Moorhouse	
Gascoyne	Liberal	Frank Davis	Ian Laurance	Wilson Tuckey	Robert Phillips (Ind)
Geraldton	Labor	Jeff Carr	Joseph Willoughby	Victor Askew	Phillip Cooper (Ind)
Greenough	Liberal	Frederic Newman	**David Brand**		
Kalamunda	Liberal	Michael Marsh	**Ian Thompson**	Benjamin Ballantyne	Francesco Nesci (Ind)
Kalgoorlie	Labor	**Tom Evans**	Max Finlayson	Geoffrey Sands	
Karrinyup	Labor	Mervyn Knight	Jim Clarko	Laurence Butterly	
Katanning	Alliance	Kenneth Gawn	Peter Hatherly	Dick Old	
Kimberley	Liberal	Robert Baker	**Alan Ridge**	Keith Wright	
Maylands	Labor	**John Harman**	Pauline Iles	Edward Barlow	
Melville	Labor	**John Tonkin**	Cedric Smith	Barney Foley	
Merredin-Yilgarn	Labor	**James Brown**	Brian Cahill	Hendy Cowan	
Moore	Alliance		Terence Millstead	Bert Crane	
Morley	Labor	**Arthur Tonkin**	Lloyd Stewart		
Mount Hawthorn	Labor	**Ron Bertram**	Timothy Foley	Peter Tilley	
Mount Lawley	Liberal	Arthur Chauncy	**Ray O'Connor**	John Poole	
Mount Marshall	Alliance			**Ray McPharlin**	
Mundaring	Labor	**James Moiler**	Andrew Hugh	Ivan Sands	
Murchison-Eyre	Liberal	Julian Grill	**Peter Coyne**		
Murray	Liberal	Geoffrey Dix	Richard Shalders	Wayne McRostie	
Narrogin	Alliance	Gordon Appleton	Robert Farr	Peter Jones	
Nedlands	Liberal	Christopher Thompson	**Charles Court**		
Perth	Labor	**Terry Burke**	Julius Re	Robert Burns	William Barrett (Aust)
Pilbara	Labor	**Arthur Bickerton**	Brian Sodeman		Ian Kelly (Aust)
Rockingham	Labor	Mike Barnett	Reginald Ritchie	Ronald Harman	Eric Edwards (Ind)
Roe	Alliance	John Byrne	Geoff Grewar	**Bill Young**	
Scarborough	Labor	Des Moore	Ray Young	Adrian Briffa	
South Perth	Liberal	Garry Kelly	**Bill Grayden**	Bill Wallace	
Stirling	Alliance	Eric Bromilow	Glen Mitchell	**Matt Stephens**	
Subiaco	Liberal	Phillip Hall	**Tom Dadour**	Francis Dwyer	Ronald Hislop (Aust)
Swan	Labor	Jack Skidmore	Douglas Ismail	Pietro Bendotti	
Toodyay	Labor	Clifford Hunt	Mick Nanovich	Albert Tonkin	George Gaunt (Aust)
Vasse	Liberal	Robert Goddard	**Barry Blaikie**	Ronald Loughton	
Victoria Park	Labor	**Ron Davies**	Frank Marciano	Paul Daly	
Warren	Labor	**David Evans**	Maurice Thompson	John Dempster	
Wellington	Liberal	Andrew Thomson	June Craig	John Chidlow	
Welshpool	Labor	**Colin Jamieson**	George Fisher	Laurence Eaton	

== Legislative Council ==
Sitting members are shown in bold text. Successful candidates are highlighted in the relevant colour. Where there is possible confusion, an asterisk (*) is also used.

Electorate	Held by	Labor candidate	Liberal candidate	Alliance candidate	Other candidates
Central	Alliance			Harry Gayfer	
Lower Central	Alliance	Fred Hebbard	Sandy Lewis	Eric James	
Lower North	Liberal	Arthur Cole	**George Berry**		
Lower West	Liberal	Everald Cortis	Ian Pratt		
Metropolitan	Liberal	Patricia Fowkes	**Ian Medcalf**		
North	Labor	**John Hunt**	John Tozer		
North Metropolitan	Labor	**Roy Claughton**	Bob Pike	Marie Clarke	
North-East Metropolitan	Labor	Don Cooley	Anne Cameron		
South	Alliance	Albert Newman	Thomas Knight	Leonard Gleeson	
South Metropolitan	Labor	**Ronald Thompson**	Philip Pusey		
South-East	Labor	**Claude Stubbs**	Mick Cotter		
South-East Metropolitan	Labor	Grace Vaughan	George Spalding	David Milne	
South-West	Liberal	Marion Kelleher	**Graham MacKinnon**		
Upper West	Alliance	Stanley Bell	Margaret McAleer	Charles Mildwaters	
West	Alliance	Newell Jamieson	Gordon Masters	Patrick Cranley	

== See also ==
- Members of the Western Australian Legislative Assembly, 1971–1974
- Members of the Western Australian Legislative Assembly, 1974–1977
- Members of the Western Australian Legislative Council, 1971–1974
- Members of the Western Australian Legislative Council, 1974–1977
- 1974 Western Australian state election
