= Results of the 1974 Western Australian state election (Legislative Council) =

Western Australian state election, 30 March 1974 Legislative Council
Enrolled voters	581,784^{[1]}				
Votes cast	523,182		Turnout	89.93%	–1.28%
Informal votes	25,072		Informal	4.79%	–0.33%
Summary of votes by party
Party	Primary votes	%	Swing	Seats won	Seats held
Labor	235,271	47.23%	+0.45%	5	9
Liberal	226,288	45.43%	+18.07%	9	18
Alliance (CP/DLP)	36,551	7.34%	–13.66%	1	3
Independent			–5.86%	0	0
Total	498,110			15	30
Two-party-preferred
Liberal/NA	267,672	51.90%			
Labor	248,040	48.10%			

This is a list of electoral region results for the Western Australian Legislative Council in the 1974 Western Australian state election.

== Results by electoral province ==
=== Central ===
1974 Western Australian state election: Central Province
Party	Candidate	Votes	%	±%
National Alliance	Harry Gayfer	unopposed		
National Alliance hold		Swing		

=== Lower Central ===
1974 Western Australian state election: Lower Central Province
Party	Candidate	Votes	%	±%
Labor	Fred Hebbard	8,258	41.0	
Liberal	Sandy Lewis	6,023	29.9	
National Alliance	Eric James	5,882	29.2	
Total formal votes		20,163	95.5	
Informal votes		955	4.5	
Turnout		21,118	92.8	
Two-party-preferred result
Liberal	Sandy Lewis	11,268	55.9	
Labor	Fred Hebbard	8,895	44.1	
Liberal gain from National Alliance		Swing		

=== Lower North ===
1974 Western Australian state election: Lower North Province
Party	Candidate	Votes	%	±%
Liberal	George Berry	3,317	67.0	
Labor	Arthur Cole	1,631	33.0	
Total formal votes		4,948	95.7	
Informal votes		220	4.3	
Turnout		5,168	85.9	
Liberal hold		Swing		

=== Lower West ===
1974 Western Australian state election: Lower West Province
Party	Candidate	Votes	%	±%
Liberal	Ian Pratt	13,022	53.2	
Labor	Everald Cortis	11,467	46.8	
Total formal votes		24,489	96.0	
Informal votes		1,019	4.0	
Turnout		25,508	91.5	
Liberal hold		Swing		

=== Metropolitan ===
1974 Western Australian state election: Metropolitan Province
Party	Candidate	Votes	%	±%
Liberal	Ian Medcalf	40,478	60.8	
Labor	Patricia Fowkes	26,056	39.2	
Total formal votes		66,534	96.2	
Informal votes		2,614	3.8	
Turnout		69,148	88.0	
Liberal hold		Swing		

=== North ===
1974 Western Australian state election: North Province
Party	Candidate	Votes	%	±%
Liberal	John Tozer	5,254	51.0	
Labor	John Hunt	5,044	49.0	
Total formal votes		10,298	94.3	
Informal votes		625	5.7	
Turnout		10,923	81.2	
Liberal gain from Labor		Swing		

=== North Metropolitan ===
1974 Western Australian state election: North Metropolitan Province
Party	Candidate	Votes	%	±%
Labor	Roy Claughton	35,469	48.6	
Liberal	Bob Pike	31,403	43.0	
National Alliance	Marie Clarke	6,086	8.3	
Total formal votes		72,958	94.9	
Informal votes		3,931	5.1	
Turnout		76,889	91.1	
Two-party-preferred result
Labor	Roy Claughton	37,414	51.3	
Liberal	Bob Pike	35,544	48.7	
Labor hold		Swing		

=== North-East Metropolitan ===
1974 Western Australian state election: North-East Metropolitan Province
Party	Candidate	Votes	%	±%
Labor	Don Cooley	31,386	55.0	
Liberal	Anne Cameron	25,713	45.0	
Total formal votes		57,099	93.9	
Informal votes		3,735	6.1	
Turnout		60,834	90.0	
Labor hold		Swing		

=== South ===
1974 Western Australian state election: South Province
Party	Candidate	Votes	%	±%
National Alliance	Leonard Gleeson	7,980	38.7	
Liberal	Thomas Knight	6,694	32.4	
Labor	Albert Newman	5,956	28.9	
Total formal votes		20,630	96.1	
Informal votes		832	3.9	
Turnout		21,462	91.2	
Two-candidate-preferred result
Liberal	Thomas Knight	11,124	53.9	
National Alliance	Leonard Gleeson	9,506	46.1	
Liberal gain from National Alliance		Swing		

=== South Metropolitan ===
1974 Western Australian state election: South Metropolitan Province
Party	Candidate	Votes	%	±%
Labor	Ronald Thompson	36,894	64.2	
Liberal	Philip Pusey	20,589	35.8	
Total formal votes		57,483	95.3	
Informal votes		2,812	4.7	
Turnout		60,295	90.1	
Labor hold		Swing		

=== South-East ===
1974 Western Australian state election: South-East Province
Party	Candidate	Votes	%	±%
Labor	Claude Stubbs	9,453	51.3	
Liberal	Mick Cotter	8,990	48.7	
Total formal votes		18,443	94.1	
Informal votes		1,165	5.9	
Turnout		19,608	88.7	
Labor hold		Swing		

=== South-East Metropolitan ===
1974 Western Australian state election: South-East Metropolitan Province
Party	Candidate	Votes	%	±%
Labor	Grace Vaughan	36,364	49.1	
Liberal	George Spalding	31,727	42.9	
National Alliance	David Milne	5,919	8.0	
Total formal votes		74,010	95.2	
Informal votes		3,696	4.8	
Turnout		77,706	89.1	
Two-party-preferred result
Labor	Grace Vaughan	38,246	51.7	
Liberal	George Spalding	35,764	48.3	
Labor hold		Swing		

=== South-West ===
1974 Western Australian state election: South-West Province
Party	Candidate	Votes	%	±%
Liberal	Graham MacKinnon	12,475	56.3	
Labor	Marion Kelleher	9,674	43.7	
Total formal votes		22,149	95.9	
Informal votes		948	4.1	
Turnout		23,097	93.5	
Liberal hold		Swing		

=== Upper West ===
1974 Western Australian state election: Upper West Province
Party	Candidate	Votes	%	±%
Liberal	Margaret McAleer	7,965	41.2	
National Alliance	Charles Mildwaters	6,732	34.8	
Labor	Stanley Bell	4,633	24.0	
Total formal votes		19,330	95.0	
Informal votes		1,012	5.0	
Turnout		20,342	89.8	
Two-candidate-preferred result
Liberal	Margaret McAleer	11,409	59.0	
National Alliance	Charles Mildwaters	7,921	41.0	
Liberal gain from National Alliance		Swing		

=== West ===
1974 Western Australian state election: West Province
Party	Candidate	Votes	%	±%
Labor	Newell Jamieson	12,986	43.9	
Liberal	Gordon Masters	12,638	42.7	
National Alliance	Patrick Cranley	3,952	13.4	
Total formal votes		29,576	94.9	
Informal votes		1,508	5.1	
Turnout		31,084	91.8	
Two-party-preferred result
Liberal	Gordon Masters	15,228	51.5	
Labor	Newell Jamieson	14,348	48.5	
Liberal gain from National Alliance		Swing		

== See also ==
- Results of the Western Australian state election, 1974 (Legislative Assembly)
- 1974 Western Australian state election
- Candidates of the 1974 Western Australian state election
- Members of the Western Australian Legislative Council, 1974–1977
