= Results of the 1980 Western Australian state election (Legislative Council) =

Western Australian state election, 23 February 1980 Legislative Council
Enrolled voters	714,724				
Votes cast	631,915		Turnout	88.41%	–2.29%
Informal votes	27,692		Informal	4.38%	–0.03%
Summary of votes by party
Party	Primary votes	%	Swing	Seats won	Seats held
Liberal	287,058	47.51%	–2.80%	10	19
Labor	270,538	44.77%	+2.82%	5	9
National Country^{[1]}	23,101	3.82%	+0.65%	1	3
National^{[1]}	20,704	3.43%	+1.04%	0	1
Progress	2,822	0.47%	+0.47%	0	0
Independent	0	0.00%	–2.18%	0	0
Total	604,223			16	32
Two-party-preferred
Liberal/NCP	316,398	52.36%	–3.26%		
Labor	287,825	47.64%	+3.26%		

This is a list of electoral region results for the Western Australian Legislative Council in the 1980 Western Australian state election.

== Results by electoral province ==
=== Central ===
1980 Western Australian state election: Central Province
Party	Candidate	Votes	%	±%
National Country	Harry Gayfer	7,971	38.5	−14.6
Labor	Pamela Doust	4,457	21.5	+21.5
Liberal	Gordon Atkinson	4,424	21.4	−8.3
National	Murray Anderson	3,855	18.6	+18.6
Total formal votes		20,707	95.7	+1.4
Informal votes		923	4.3	−1.4
Turnout		21,630	91.8	−1.1
After distribution of preferences
National Country	Harry Gayfer	10,813	52.2	
Liberal	Gordon Atkinson	5,199	25.1	
Labor	Pamela Doust	4,695	22.7	
National Country hold		Swing	N/A	

- Preferences were not distributed to completion.

=== East Metropolitan ===
1980 Western Australian state election: East Metropolitan Province
Party	Candidate	Votes	%	±%
Labor	Bob Hetherington	32,350	58.0	+0.9
Liberal	Brian Brand	23,383	42.0	−0.9
Total formal votes		55,733	94.6	−0.3
Informal votes		3,206	5.4	+0.3
Turnout		58,939	87.6	−2.5
Labor hold		Swing	+0.9	

=== Lower Central ===
1980 Western Australian state election: Lower Central Province
Party	Candidate	Votes	%	±%
Labor	Douglas Simcock	8,647	38.0	+0.5
Liberal	Sandy Lewis	6,840	30.0	+0.4
National Country	Robert Reid	5,722	25.1	−7.8
National	Robert Wardell-Johnson	1,570	6.9	+6.9
Total formal votes		22,779	96.0	−0.2
Informal votes		951	4.0	+0.2
Turnout		23,730	91.9	−1.9
Two-party-preferred result
Liberal	Sandy Lewis	12,789	56.1	+56.1
Labor	Douglas Simcock	9,990	43.9	+3.5
Liberal hold		Swing	−3.5	

=== Lower North ===
1980 Western Australian state election: Lower North Province
Party	Candidate	Votes	%	±%
Liberal	Phil Lockyer	2,389	50.0	−11.5
Labor	Lino Paggi	1,928	40.4	+1.9
National	Robert Crombie	459	9.6	+9.6
Total formal votes		4,776	96.4	+0.4
Informal votes		178	3.6	−0.4
Turnout		4,954	84.8	−1.8
Liberal hold		Swing	N/A	

- Preferences were not distributed.

=== Lower West ===
1980 Western Australian state election: Lower West Province
Party	Candidate	Votes	%	±%
Liberal	Ian Pratt	13,615	49.3	−6.2
Labor	Richard Savage	12,892	46.6	+2.1
Progress	John Trewick	1,104	4.0	+4.0
Total formal votes		27,611	94.7	−1.5
Informal votes		1,556	5.3	+1.5
Turnout		29,167	90.8	−1.6
Two-party-preferred result
Liberal	Ian Pratt	13,979	50.6	−4.9
Labor	Richard Savage	13,632	49.4	+4.9
Liberal hold		Swing	−4.9	

=== Metropolitan ===
1980 Western Australian state election: Metropolitan Province
Party	Candidate	Votes	%	±%
Liberal	Ian Medcalf	38,034	60.5	+1.4
Labor	Gordon Payne	24,869	39.5	+5.1
Total formal votes		62,903	96.5	+0.2
Informal votes		2,249	3.5	−0.2
Turnout		65,152	86.1	−2.9
Liberal hold		Swing	N/A	

=== North ===
1980 Western Australian state election: North Province
Party	Candidate	Votes	%	±%
Labor	Peter Dowding	8,855	51.7	+5.3
Liberal	John Tozer	8,275	48.3	−5.3
Total formal votes		17,130	95.4	+0.8
Informal votes		816	4.6	−0.8
Turnout		17,946	78.8	−4.0
Labor gain from Liberal		Swing	+5.3	

=== North Metropolitan ===
1980 Western Australian state election: North Metropolitan Province
Party	Candidate	Votes	%	±%
Liberal	Peter Wells	42,282	51.9	−2.0
Labor	Roy Claughton	39,174	48.1	+2.0
Total formal votes		81,456	95.4	−0.5
Informal votes		3,961	4.6	+0.5
Turnout		85,417	88.3	−2.6
Liberal gain from Labor		Swing	−2.0	

=== North-East Metropolitan ===
1980 Western Australian state election: North-East Metropolitan Province
Party	Candidate	Votes	%	±%
Labor	Joe Berinson	43,676	59.6	+5.4
Liberal	Wouterina Klein	29,568	40.4	−5.4
Total formal votes		73,244	95.1	−0.2
Informal votes		3,775	4.9	+0.2
Turnout		77,019	88.4	−2.2
Labor hold		Swing	+5.4	

=== South ===
1980 Western Australian state election: South Province
Party	Candidate	Votes	%	±%
Liberal	Thomas Knight	10,982	47.1	−5.5
National	Robert Whalley	7,362	31.6	+31.6
National Country	Robert Russell	4,951	21.3	−14.2
Total formal votes		23,295	96.4	+1.5
Informal votes		876	3.6	−1.5
Turnout		24,171	91.3	−1.3
Two-candidate-preferred result
Liberal	Thomas Knight	15,142	65.0	
National	Robert Whalley	8,153	35.0	
Liberal hold		Swing	N/A	

=== South Metropolitan ===
1980 Western Australian state election: South Metropolitan Province
Party	Candidate	Votes	%	±%
Labor	Howard Olney	32,765	58.1	+5.2
Liberal	John Buhagiar	23,656	41.9	−5.2
Total formal votes		56,421	95.6	−0.1
Informal votes		2,603	4.4	+0.1
Turnout		59,024	89.2	−2.2
Labor hold		Swing	+5.2	

=== South-East ===
1980 Western Australian state election: South-East Province
Party	Candidate	Votes	%	±%
Labor	James Brown	11,027	58.2	+6.7
Liberal	Irvin Muir	7,928	41.8	−6.7
Total formal votes		18,955	93.4	−1.2
Informal votes		1,340	6.6	+1.2
Turnout		20,295	86.9	−2.3
Labor hold		Swing	+6.7	

=== South-East Metropolitan ===
1980 Western Australian state election: South-East Metropolitan Province
Party	Candidate	Votes	%	±%
Liberal	Phillip Pendal	34,749	53.2	−4.7
Labor	Grace Vaughan	30,610	46.8	+4.7
Total formal votes		65,359	96.6	+0.5
Informal votes		2,613	3.4	−0.5
Turnout		67,972	88.6	−2.4
Liberal gain from Labor		Swing	−4.7	

=== South-West ===
1980 Western Australian state election: South-West Province
Party	Candidate	Votes	%	±%
Liberal	Graham MacKinnon	14,927	59.1	+2.7
Labor	Pandora Nikola	10,320	40.9	+6.3
Total formal votes		25,247	96.6	+0.5
Informal votes		892	3.4	−0.5
Turnout		26,139	91.4	−2.1
Liberal hold		Swing	N/A	

=== Upper West ===
1980 Western Australian state election: Upper West Province
Party	Candidate	Votes	%	±%
Liberal	Margaret McAleer	11,453	45.6	−0.4
National	Sue Shields	7,458	29.7	+29.7
National Country	Robert Michael	4,457	17.8	−9.3
Total formal votes		25,086	96.3	+0.2
Informal votes		952	3.7	−0.2
Turnout		26,038	89.9	−1.9
Two-candidate-preferred result
Liberal	Margaret McAleer	15,829	63.1	+13.7
National	Sue Shields	9,257	36.9	+36.9
Liberal hold		Swing	N/A	

=== West ===
1980 Western Australian state election: West Province
Party	Candidate	Votes	%	±%
Liberal	Gordon Masters	14,553	61.9	+0.6
Labor	Jan Kaub	8,968	38.1	−0.6
Total formal votes		23,521	96.7	+1.1
Informal votes		801	3.3	−1.1
Turnout		24,322	88.9	−1.2
Liberal hold		Swing	+0.6	

== See also ==
- Results of the Western Australian state election, 1980 (Legislative Assembly)
- 1980 Western Australian state election
- Candidates of the 1980 Western Australian state election
- Members of the Western Australian Legislative Council, 1980–1983
