= Members of the Western Australian Legislative Council, 1977–1980 =

This is a list of members of the Western Australian Legislative Council from 22 May 1977 to 21 May 1980. The chamber had 32 seats made up of 16 provinces each electing two members, on a system of rotation whereby one-half of the members would retire at each triennial election. A new province, East Metropolitan, was added at the 1977 election. During the term, the National Country Party split in two over the issue of coalition with the Liberal Party, with supporters of the Coalition remaining in the National Country Party (NCP), and opponents creating a new National Party (NP). They reunited in 1985.

Name	Party	Province	Term expires	Years in office
Norm Baxter	National/NCP	Central	1983	1950–1958; 1960–1983
George Berry	Liberal	Lower North	1980	1968–1980
Roy Claughton	Labor	North Metropolitan	1980	1968–1980
Don Cooley	Labor	North-East Metropolitan	1980	1974–1980
Des Dans	Labor	South Metropolitan	1983	1971–1989
Lyla Elliott	Labor	North-East Metropolitan	1983	1971–1986
Vic Ferry	Liberal	South-West	1983	1965–1987
Harry Gayfer	National/NCP	Central	1980	1974–1989
Clive Griffiths	Liberal	South-East Metropolitan	1983	1965–1997
Bob Hetherington	Labor	East Metropolitan	1980	1977–1989
Thomas Knight	Liberal	South	1980	1974–1986
Ron Leeson	Labor	South-East	1983	1971–1983
Sandy Lewis	Liberal	Lower Central	1980	1974–1989
Margaret McAleer	Liberal	Upper West	1980	1974–1993
Fred McKenzie	Labor	East Metropolitan	1983	1977–1993
Graham MacKinnon	Liberal	South West	1980	1956–1986
Thomas McNeil	National/NP	Upper West	1983	1977–1989
Neil McNeill	Liberal	Lower West	1983	1965–1983
Gordon Masters	Liberal	West	1980	1974–1989
Ian Medcalf	Liberal	Metropolitan	1980	1968–1986
Norman Moore	Liberal	Lower North	1983	1977–2013
Neil Oliver	Liberal	West	1983	1977–1989
Winifred Piesse	National/NCP	Lower Central	1983	1977–1983
Bob Pike	Liberal	North Metropolitan	1983	1977–1983; 1989–1994
Ian Pratt	Liberal	Lower West	1980	1974–1986
Claude Stubbs	Labor	South-East	1980	1962–1980
Ronald Thompson	Labor/Independent	South Metropolitan	1980	1959–1980
John Tozer	Liberal	North	1980	1974–1980
Grace Vaughan	Labor	South-East Metropolitan	1980	1974–1980
Richard Williams	Liberal	Metropolitan	1983	1971–1989
Bill Withers	Liberal	North	1983	1971–1982
David Wordsworth	Liberal	South	1983	1971–1993

== Sources ==
- Black, David (1991). Legislative Council of Western Australia : membership register, electoral law and statistics, 1890-1989. Perth: Parliamentary History Project. ISBN 0-7309-3641-4.
- Hughes, Colin A.; Aitkin, Don (1986). Voting for the Australian State Upper Houses, 1890-1984. Canberra: Australian National University. ISBN 0-909779-18-X.
- Black, David; Bolton, Geoffrey (2001b). Biographical Register of Members of the Parliament of Western Australia. Vol. Two: 1930-1990 (Revised ed.). Parliament House: Parliament of Western Australia. ISBN 0731697839.
