= Results of the 1986 Western Australian state election (Legislative Council) =

Western Australian state election, 8 February 1986 Legislative Council
Enrolled voters	883,239				
Votes cast	807,496		Turnout	91.42%	+2.44%
Informal votes	26,530		Informal	3.29%	–0.43%
Summary of votes by party
Party	Primary votes	%	Swing	Seats won	Seats held
Labor	352,437	45.13%	–5.50%	9	15
Liberal	327,786	41.97%	+0.40%	6	15
National	37,194	4.76%	–1.59%	2	4
Democrats	63,483	8.13%	+6.68%	0	0
Independent	66	0.01%	+0.01%	0	0
Total	780,966			17	34
Two-party-preferred
Labor	418,124	53.54%	+0.57%		
Liberal	361,160	46.25%	–0.57%		

This is a list of electoral region results for the Western Australian Legislative Council in the 1986 Western Australian state election.

== Results by electoral province ==
=== Central ===
1986 Western Australian state election: Central Province
Party	Candidate	Votes	%	±%
National	Harry Gayfer	11,629	45.5	+21.5
Liberal	John Panizza	7,258	28.4	+2.3
Labor	Kim Chance	6,660	26.1	−2.2
Total formal votes		25,547	98.0	+1.5
Informal votes		525	2.0	−1.5
Turnout		26,072	94.2	+4.1
Two-candidate-preferred result
National	Harry Gayfer	13,216	51.7	+51.7
Liberal	John Panizza	12,331	48.3	−17.3
National hold		Swing	N/A	

=== Lower Central ===
1986 Western Australian state election: Lower Central Province
Party	Candidate	Votes	%	±%
Labor	John Bird	9,638	38.3	−7.2
Liberal	Sandy Lewis	8,791	34.9	+6.8
National	Eric Blight	5,815	23.1	−3.4
Democrats	Violet Fussell	927	3.7	+3.7
Total formal votes		25,171	97.4	+0.2
Informal votes		659	2.6	−0.2
Turnout		25,830	94.2	+2.8
Two-party-preferred result
Liberal	Sandy Lewis	14,122	56.1	+4.3
Labor	John Bird	11,049	43.9	−4.3
Liberal hold		Swing	+4.3	

=== Lower North ===
1986 Western Australian state election: Lower North Province
Party	Candidate	Votes	%	±%
Liberal	Phil Lockyer	4,083	59.0	+0.6
Labor	Lesley-Ann Hoare	2,299	33.2	−5.9
Democrats	Kenneth Winder	472	6.8	+6.8
Independent	Francesco Nesci	66	1.0	−1.5
Total formal votes		6,920	95.2	+0.2
Informal votes		346	4.8	−0.2
Turnout		7,266	82.4	+1.3
Liberal hold		Swing	N/A	

- Preferences were not distributed.

=== Lower West ===
1986 Western Australian state election: Lower West Province
Party	Candidate	Votes	%	±%
Liberal	Ian Pratt	15,221	46.7	−2.2
Labor	Beryl Jones	15,185	46.6	+3.7
Democrats	Shirley de la Hunty	2,210	6.8	−1.4
Total formal votes		32,616	97.3	+0.2
Informal votes		910	2.7	−0.2
Turnout		33,526	93.4	+2.6
Two-party-preferred result
Labor	Beryl Jones	16,359	50.2	+3.7
Liberal	Ian Pratt	16,257	49.8	−3.7
Labor gain from Liberal		Swing	+3.7	

=== Metropolitan ===
1986 Western Australian state election: Metropolitan Province
Party	Candidate	Votes	%	±%
Liberal	Max Evans	41,833	52.4	−4.0
Democrats	Jack Evans	33,642	42.2	+42.2
Independent Labor	Patrick Finn	4,309	5.4	+5.4
Total formal votes		79,784	96.7	−0.3
Informal votes		2,726	3.3	+0.3
Turnout		82,510	89.5	+3.3
Liberal hold		Swing	N/A	

- Preferences were not distributed.

=== North ===
1986 Western Australian state election: North Province
Party	Candidate	Votes	%	±%
Labor	Tom Helm	14,319	58.5	−6.7
Labor	Frank Butler	8,855	36.2	+36.2
Democrats	Helen Aquilina	1,293	5.3	+5.3
Total formal votes		24,467	94.1	−1.6
Informal votes		1,541	5.9	+1.6
Turnout		26,008	78.9	−8.6
Labor hold		Swing	N/A	

- Preferences were not distributed.

=== North Central Metropolitan ===
1986 Western Australian state election: North Central Metropolitan Province
Party	Candidate	Votes	%	±%
Labor	Joe Berinson	41,580	59.5	−0.5
Liberal	Frank Hansford-Miller	25,105	35.9	−4.1
Democrats	Jean Foster	3,219	4.6	+4.6
Total formal votes		69,904	96.1	+0.2
Informal votes		2,836	3.9	−0.2
Turnout		72,740	92.3	+4.5
Labor hold		Swing	N/A	

- Preferences were not distributed.

=== North Metropolitan ===
1986 Western Australian state election: North Metropolitan Province
Party	Candidate	Votes	%	±%
Labor	John Halden	41,060	49.0	−1.5
Liberal	Peter Wells	36,815	43.9	−2.1
Democrats	Jean Jenkins	5,983	7.1	+4.6
Total formal votes		83,858	97.5	+1.0
Informal votes		2,168	2.5	−1.0
Turnout		86,026	92.5	+3.8
Two-party-preferred result
Labor	John Halden	44,322	52.9	
Liberal	Peter Wells	39,536	47.1	
Labor gain from Liberal		Swing	N/A	

=== North-East Metropolitan ===
1986 Western Australian state election: North-East Metropolitan Province
Party	Candidate	Votes	%	±%
Labor	Tom Butler	52,785	61.5	−2.0
Liberal	Robert Nicholson	28,113	32.8	+0.1
Democrats	Fred Long	4,901	5.7	+1.9
Total formal votes		85,799	95.9	+2.0
Informal votes		3,667	4.1	−2.0
Turnout		89,466	92.0	+3.3
Labor hold		Swing	N/A	

- Preferences were not distributed.

=== South ===
1986 Western Australian state election: South Province
Party	Candidate	Votes	%	±%
Liberal	Thomas Knight	11,571	44.0	+7.9
National	John Caldwell	7,427	28.3	+9.5
Labor	Albert Newman	7,282	27.7	+0.5
Total formal votes		26,280	97.2	+0.5
Informal votes		640	2.8	−0.5
Turnout		26,920	93.6	+3.3
Two-candidate-preferred result
National	John Caldwell	13,781	52.4	+52.4
Liberal	Thomas Knight	12,499	47.6	−19.1
National gain from Liberal		Swing	N/A	

=== South Central Metropolitan ===
1986 Western Australian state election: South Central Metropolitan Province
Party	Candidate	Votes	%	±%
Liberal	Phillip Pendal	31,320	51.8	+1.9
Labor	John Bissett	24,814	41.0	−3.7
Democrats	Alan Needham	4,347	7.2	+1.7
Total formal votes		60,481	97.2	+0.6
Informal votes		1,736	2.8	−0.6
Turnout		62,217	90.9	+2.6
Liberal hold		Swing	N/A	

- Preferences were not distributed.

=== South East ===
1986 Western Australian state election: South-East Province
Party	Candidate	Votes	%	±%
Labor	James Brown	11,801	60.1	+0.1
Liberal	Douglas Krepp	7,826	39.9	−0.1
Total formal votes		19,627	95.9	−0.6
Informal votes		840	4.1	+0.6
Turnout		20,467	89.5	+1.0
Labor hold		Swing	+0.1	

=== South Metropolitan ===
1986 Western Australian state election: South Metropolitan Province
Party	Candidate	Votes	%	±%
Labor	Garry Kelly	51,141	69.8	+0.1
Liberal	Alan Harste	22,126	30.2	−0.1
Total formal votes		73,267	96.3	+0.4
Informal votes		2,814	3.7	−0.4
Turnout		76,081	92.3	−0.1
Labor hold		Swing	+0.1	

=== South-East Metropolitan ===
1986 Western Australian state election: South-East Metropolitan Province
Party	Candidate	Votes	%	±%
Labor	Bob Hetherington	44,649	55.1	−4.5
Liberal	Jonathan Shack	33,428	41.2	+0.8
Democrats	Douglas Gettingby	2,983	3.7	+3.7
Total formal votes		81,060	96.8	−0.1
Informal votes		2,690	3.2	+0.1
Turnout		83,750	92.3	+3.3
Labor hold		Swing	N/A	

- Preferences were not distributed.

=== South West ===
1986 Western Australian state election: South-West Province
Party	Candidate	Votes	%	±%
Liberal	James Dwyer	13,948	48.5	−2.4
Labor	Doug Wenn	13,516	47.0	−2.1
Democrats	Janice Bowen	1,302	4.5	+4.5
Total formal votes		28,766	97.4	+0.4
Informal votes		764	2.6	−0.4
Turnout		29,530	93.3	+1.6
Two-party-preferred result
Labor	Doug Wenn	14,418	50.1	+1.0
Liberal	James Dwyer	14,348	49.9	−1.0
Labor gain from Liberal		Swing	+1.0	

=== Upper West ===
1986 Western Australian state election: Upper West Province
Party	Candidate	Votes	%	±%
Liberal	Margaret McAleer	16,245	56.9	+21.4
National	Sue Shields	12,323	43.1	−3.2
Total formal votes		28,568	96.8	0.0
Informal votes		954	3.2	0.0
Turnout		29,522	92.1	+2.7
Liberal hold		Swing	+8.4	

=== West ===
1986 Western Australian state election: West Province
Party	Candidate	Votes	%	±%
Liberal	Gordon Masters	15,248	52.8	−0.9
Labor	Nadeem Ramsay	11,399	39.5	−6.8
Democrats	Kenneth Goodman	2,204	7.6	+7.6
Total formal votes		28,851	97.6	−0.3
Informal votes		714	2.4	+0.3
Turnout		29,565	91.8	+2.6
Liberal hold		Swing	N/A	

- Preferences were not distributed.

== See also ==
- Results of the Western Australian state election, 1986 (Legislative Assembly A-L)
- Results of the Western Australian state election, 1986 (Legislative Assembly M-Z)
- 1986 Western Australian state election
- Candidates of the Western Australian state election, 1986
- Members of the Western Australian Legislative Council, 1986–1989
