= Members of the Western Australian Legislative Council, 1974–1977 =

This is a list of members of the Western Australian Legislative Council from 22 May 1974 to 21 May 1977. The chamber had 30 seats made up of 15 provinces each electing two members, on a system of rotation whereby one-half of the members would retire at each triennial election.

Name	Party	Province	Term expires	Years in office
Charles Abbey	Liberal	West	1977	1958–1977
Norm Baxter	Country	Central	1977	1950–1958; 1960–1983
George Berry	Liberal	Lower North	1980	1968–1980
Roy Claughton	Labor	North Metropolitan	1980	1968–1980
Don Cooley	Labor	North-East Metropolitan	1980	1974–1980
Des Dans	Labor	South Metropolitan	1977	1971–1989
Stan Dellar	Labor	Lower North	1977	1971–1977
Lyla Elliott	Labor	North-East Metropolitan	1977	1971–1986
Vic Ferry	Liberal	South-West	1977	1965–1987
Harry Gayfer	Country	Central	1980	1974–1989
Arthur Griffith	Liberal	North Metropolitan	1977	1953–1977
Clive Griffiths	Liberal	South-East Metropolitan	1977	1965–1997
Jack Heitman	Liberal	Upper West	1977	1963–1977
Thomas Knight	Liberal	South	1980	1974–1986
Ron Leeson	Labor	South-East	1977	1971–1983
Sandy Lewis	Liberal	Lower Central	1980	1974–1989
Margaret McAleer	Liberal	Upper West	1980	1974–1993
Graham MacKinnon	Liberal	South West	1980	1956–1986
Neil McNeill	Liberal	Lower West	1977	1965–1983
Gordon Masters	Liberal	West	1980	1974–1989
Ian Medcalf	Liberal	Metropolitan	1980	1968–1986
Thomas Perry	Country	Lower Central	1977	1965–1977
Ian Pratt	Liberal	Lower West	1980	1974–1986
Claude Stubbs	Labor	South-East	1980	1962–1980
Ronald Thompson	Labor	South Metropolitan	1980	1959–1980
John Tozer	Liberal	North	1980	1974–1980
Grace Vaughan	Labor	South-East Metropolitan	1980	1974–1980
Richard Williams	Liberal	Metropolitan	1977	1971–1989
Bill Withers	Liberal	North	1977	1971–1982
David Wordsworth	Liberal	South	1977	1971–1993

== Sources ==
- Black, David (1991). Legislative Council of Western Australia : membership register, electoral law and statistics, 1890-1989. Perth: Parliamentary History Project. ISBN 0-7309-3641-4.
- Hughes, Colin A.; Aitkin, Don (1986). Voting for the Australian State Upper Houses, 1890-1984. Canberra: Australian National University. ISBN 0-909779-18-X.
- Black, David; Bolton, Geoffrey (2001b). Biographical Register of Members of the Parliament of Western Australia. Vol. Two: 1930-1990 (Revised ed.). Parliament House: Parliament of Western Australia. ISBN 0731697839.
