= Electoral results for the district of Merredin =

Western Australian district election results

This is a list of electoral results for the Electoral district of Merredin in Western Australian state elections.

== Members for Merredin ==
Merredin-Yilgarn (1950–1977)
Member	Party	Term
Lionel Kelly	Labor	1950–1968
Jack Stewart	Liberal	1968–1971
James Brown	Labor	1971–1974
Hendy Cowan	Country	1974–1977
Merredin (1977–2008)
Member	Party	Term
Hendy Cowan	National	1977–2001
Brendon Grylls	National	2001–2008

== Election results ==
=== Elections in the 2000s ===
2005 Western Australian state election: Merredin
Party	Candidate	Votes	%	±%
National	Brendon Grylls	5,974	49.3	−1.6
Liberal	Jamie Falls	3,224	26.6	+20.8
Labor	Stephen Fewster	1,491	12.3	−3.4
New Country	Julie Townrow	575	4.7	+4.7
Greens	Robert Mann	298	2.5	−0.7
One Nation	Peter Arnold	274	2.3	−18.2
Christian Democrats	Noel Beckingham	273	2.3	+2.3
Total formal votes		12,109	96.1	0.0
Informal votes		490	3.9	0.0
Turnout		12,599	91.4	
Two-party-preferred result
National	Brendon Grylls	9,927	82.0	+9.5
Labor	Stephen Fewster	2,173	18.0	−9.5
Two-candidate-preferred result
National	Brendon Grylls	7,890	65.5	−7.0
Liberal	Jamie Falls	4,162	34.5	+34.5
National hold		Swing	−7.0	

2001 Merredin state by-election
Party	Candidate	Votes	%	±%
National	Brendon Grylls	4,551	43.1	−13.3
Liberal	Joanne Burges	3,673	34.8	+34.8
One Nation	Jamie Falls	1,197	11.3	−9.0
Labor	Darren West	949	9.0	−6.7
Democrats	Jason Meotti	194	1.8	+1.8
Total formal votes		10,564	98.3	+2.1
Informal votes		180	1.7	−2.1
Turnout		10,744	86.3	
Two-candidate-preferred result
National	Brendon Grylls	5,974	56.6	−13.7
Liberal	Joanne Burges	4,581	43.4	+43.4
National hold		Swing	N/A	

2001 Western Australian state election: Merredin
Party	Candidate	Votes	%	±%
National	Hendy Cowan	6,339	56.4	−24.8
One Nation	John McKay	2,283	20.3	+20.3
Labor	Sharon Ivey	1,761	15.7	−3.1
Greens	Robert Jeffreys	341	3.0	+3.0
Independent	Don Cowan	307	2.7	+2.7
Curtin Labor Alliance	Callum Payne	204	1.8	+1.8
Total formal votes		11,235	96.2	−1.4
Informal votes		443	3.8	+1.4
Turnout		11,678	92.2	
Two-party-preferred result
National	Hendy Cowan	8,074	72.9	−8.3
Labor	Sharon Ivey	3,005	27.1	+8.3
Two-candidate-preferred result
National	Hendy Cowan	7,872	70.3	−10.9
One Nation	John McKay	3,326	29.7	+29.7
National hold		Swing	−10.9	

=== Elections in the 1990s ===
1996 Western Australian state election: Merredin
Party	Candidate	Votes	%	±%
National	Hendy Cowan	9,488	81.2	+30.9
Labor	Mick Cole	2,203	18.8	+3.7
Total formal votes		11,691	97.6	+0.4
Informal votes		282	2.4	−0.4
Turnout		11,973	91.8	
National hold		Swing	+1.1	

1993 Western Australian state election: Merredin
Party	Candidate	Votes	%	±%
National	Hendy Cowan	5,576	53.8	−24.1
Liberal	Jos Chatfield	3,220	31.1	+31.1
Labor	Susanne Chance	1,569	15.1	−2.9
Total formal votes		10,365	97.3	+1.7
Informal votes		289	2.7	+1.7
Turnout		10,654	95.1	+2.3
Two-candidate-preferred result
National	Hendy Cowan	6,796	65.6	−15.6
Liberal	Jos Chatfield	3,569	34.4	+34.4
National hold		Swing	−15.6	

=== Elections in the 1980s ===
1989 Western Australian state election: Merredin
Party	Candidate	Votes	%	±%
National	Hendy Cowan	8,154	78.0	+20.5
Labor	Michael Fitzpatrick	1,887	18.0	+0.6
Independent	Margaret Buegge	420	4.0	+4.0
Total formal votes		10,461	95.6	
Informal votes		486	4.4	
Turnout		10,947	92.8	
Two-party-preferred result
National	Hendy Cowan	8,495	81.2	+8.9
Labor	Michael Fitzpatrick	1,966	18.8	+18.8
National hold		Swing	N/A	

1986 Western Australian state election: Merredin
Party	Candidate	Votes	%	±%
National	Hendy Cowan	5,490	64.7	+4.0
Labor	Salvatore Musca	1,651	19.4	+19.4
Liberal	Bruce Harvey	1,351	15.9	+2.6
Total formal votes		8,492	98.4	+1.3
Informal votes		136	1.6	−1.3
Turnout		8,628	95.1	+4.6
Two-party-preferred result
National	Hendy Cowan	6,709	79.0	+14.0
Labor	Salvatore Musca	1,783	21.0	+21.0
National hold		Swing	+14.0	

1983 Western Australian state election: Merredin
Party	Candidate	Votes	%	±%
National	Hendy Cowan	4,872	60.7	
National Country	Harold Lang	1,804	22.5	
Liberal	Richard Cooper	1,067	13.3	
Independent	Zoran Panzich	283	3.5	
Total formal votes		8,026	97.1	
Informal votes		242	2.9	
Turnout		8,268	90.5	
Two-candidate-preferred result
National	Hendy Cowan	5,217	65.0	
National Country	Harold Lang	2,809	35.0	
National hold		Swing		

1980 Western Australian state election: Merredin
Party	Candidate	Votes	%	±%
National	Hendy Cowan	5,111	70.6	+70.6
Liberal	Norman Oates	1,070	14.8	−4.7
National Country	Edith Towers	1,061	14.7	−42.3
Total formal votes		7,242	97.3	−0.4
Informal votes		204	2.7	+0.4
Turnout		7,446	91.6	−0.9
Two-candidate-preferred result
National	Hendy Cowan	5,323	73.5	+73.5
Liberal	Norman Oates	1,919	26.5	+26.5
National gain from National Country		Swing	N/A	

=== Elections in the 1970s ===
1977 Western Australian state election: Merredin
Party	Candidate	Votes	%	±%
National Country	Hendy Cowan	4,103	56.9	
Labor	George Banks	1,699	23.6	
Liberal	Garry Hawkes	1,408	19.5	
Total formal votes		7,210	97.7	
Informal votes		173	2.3	
Turnout		7,383	92.5	
Two-party-preferred result
National Country	Hendy Cowan	5,370	74.5	+9.5
Labor	George Banks	1,840	25.5	−9.5
National Country hold		Swing	+9.5	

1974 Western Australian state election: Merredin-Yilgarn
Party	Candidate	Votes	%	±%
National Alliance	Hendy Cowan	2,585	39.6	
Labor	James Brown	2,536	38.8	
Liberal	Brian Cahill	1,411	21.6	
Total formal votes		6,532	96.8	
Informal votes		214	3.2	
Turnout		6,746	91.8	
Two-party-preferred result
National Alliance	Hendy Cowan	3,782	57.9	
Labor	James Brown	2,750	42.1	
National Alliance gain from Labor		Swing		

1971 Western Australian state election: Merredin-Yilgarn
Party	Candidate	Votes	%	±%
Labor	James Brown	3,021	45.4	+5.5
Liberal	Jack Stewart	1,447	21.7	−4.1
Country	Albert Fletcher	1,054	15.8	−7.9
Democratic Labor	Ray Evans	733	11.0	+11.0
Independent	Jeff Legge	406	6.1	+6.1
Total formal votes		6,661	97.0	−1.9
Informal votes		208	3.0	+1.9
Turnout		6,869	92.3	−1.6
Two-party-preferred result
Labor	James Brown	3,510	52.7	+5.6
Liberal	Jack Stewart	3,151	47.3	−5.6
Labor gain from Liberal		Swing	+5.6	

=== Elections in the 1960s ===
1968 Western Australian state election: Merredin-Yilgarn
Party	Candidate	Votes	%	±%
Labor	James Brown	2,260	39.9	
Liberal and Country	Jack Stewart	1,460	25.8	
Country	Geoffrey Telfer	1,343	23.7	
Independent	Raymond Evans	602	10.6	
Total formal votes		5,665	98.9	
Informal votes		65	1.1	
Turnout		5,730	93.9	
Two-party-preferred result
Liberal and Country	Jack Stewart	2,996	52.9	
Labor	James Brown	2,669	47.1	
Liberal and Country gain from Labor		Swing		

1965 Western Australian state election: Merredin-Yilgarn
Party	Candidate	Votes	%	±%
Labor	Lionel Kelly	2,276	53.4	−4.7
Liberal and Country	Jack Stewart	1,326	31.1	+31.1
Country	Kenneth Jones	662	15.5	−26.4
Total formal votes		4,264	97.3	−1.6
Informal votes		118	2.7	+1.6
Turnout		4,382	91.6	−1.3
Two-party-preferred result
Labor	Lionel Kelly	2,342	54.9	−3.2
Liberal and Country	Jack Stewart	1,922	45.1	+45.1
Labor hold		Swing	−3.2	

1962 Western Australian state election: Merredin-Yilgarn
Party	Candidate	Votes	%	±%
Labor	Lionel Kelly	2,676	58.1	
Country	Squire Fletcher	1,927	41.9	
Total formal votes		4,603	98.9	
Informal votes		51	1.1	
Turnout		4,654	90.3	
Labor hold		Swing		

=== Elections in the 1950s ===
1959 Western Australian state election: Merredin-Yilgarn
Party	Candidate	Votes	%	±%
Labor	Lionel Kelly	3,388	72.3	+14.9
Liberal and Country	Ronald Lee	1,299	27.7	+9.6
Total formal votes		4,687	97.4	−1.0
Informal votes		123	2.6	+1.0
Turnout		4,810	91.0	−2.0
Labor hold		Swing	+13.1	

1956 Western Australian state election: Merredin-Yilgarn
Party	Candidate	Votes	%	±%
Labor	Lionel Kelly	2,818	57.4	
Country	Alfred Walker	1,206	24.6	
Liberal and Country	Robert Loder	887	18.1	
Total formal votes		4,911	98.4	
Informal votes		80	1.6	
Turnout		4,991	93.0	
Two-party-preferred result
Labor	Lionel Kelly		59.2	
Country	Alfred Walker		40.8	
Labor hold		Swing		

- Two party preferred vote was estimated.

1953 Western Australian state election: Merredin-Yilgarn
Party	Candidate	Votes	%	±%
Labor	Lionel Kelly	unopposed		
Labor hold		Swing		

1950 New South Wales state election: Merredin-Yilgarn
Party	Candidate	Votes	%	±%
Labor	Lionel Kelly	2,053	60.1	
Liberal and Country	Charles Davies	1,361	39.9	
Total formal votes		3,414	98.6	
Informal votes		48	1.4	
Turnout		3,462	90.4	
Labor hold		Swing		
