= Results of the 1986 Western Australian state election (Legislative Assembly) =

Western Australian state election, 8 February 1986 Legislative Assembly << 1983–1989 >>
Enrolled voters	883,239				
Votes cast	807,634		Turnout	91.44%	+3.51%
Informal votes	21,240		Informal	2.63%	–0.20%
Summary of votes by party
Party	Primary votes	%	Swing	Seats	Change
Labor	416,805	53.00%	–0.16%	32	± 0
Liberal	324,961	41.32%	+1.46%	19	– 1
National^{[1]}	29,156	3.71%	–1.40%	6	+ 1
Democrats	5,192	0.66%	–0.14%	0	± 0
Other parties	2,630	0.33%	–0.73%	0	± 0
Independent	7,650	0.98%	+0.48%	0	± 0
Total	786,394			57	
Two-party-preferred
Labor	427,704	54.12%	+0.37%		
Liberal	362,642	45.88%	–0.37%		

This is a list of electoral district results of the 1986 Western Australian election.

== Results by electoral district ==
=== Albany ===
1986 Western Australian state election: Albany
Party	Candidate	Votes	%	±%
Liberal	Leo Watt	4,510	53.3	+10.8
Labor	Josephine Lynch	3,947	46.7	+2.1
Total formal votes		8,457	98.1	+0.7
Informal votes		165	1.9	−0.7
Turnout		8,622	93.6	+2.9
Liberal hold		Swing	+1.0	

=== Armadale ===
1986 Western Australian state election: Armadale
Party	Candidate	Votes	%	±%
Labor	Bob Pearce	12,354	65.7	+2.4
Liberal	Phillip Giblett	6,442	34.3	−2.4
Total formal votes		18,796	97.0	−0.3
Informal votes		583	3.0	+0.3
Turnout		19,379	91.1	+2.7
Labor hold		Swing	+2.4	

=== Ascot ===
1986 Western Australian state election: Ascot
Party	Candidate	Votes	%	±%
Labor	Mal Bryce	10,163	68.2	−1.7
Liberal	Robert van Straalen	4,739	31.8	+1.7
Total formal votes		14,902	96.4	−1.0
Informal votes		552	3.6	+1.0
Turnout		15,454	91.8	+3.8
Labor hold		Swing	−1.7	

=== Avon ===
1986 Western Australian state election: Avon
Party	Candidate	Votes	%	±%
Labor	Ken McIver	4,186	46.5	−6.1
National	Max Trenorden	2,575	28.6	+5.3
Liberal	Michael Cahill	2,250	25.0	+0.9
Total formal votes		9,011	98.5	+0.5
Informal votes		139	1.5	−0.5
Turnout		9,150	93.9	+3.8
Two-party-preferred result
National	Max Trenorden	4,668	51.8	+51.8
Labor	Ken McIver	4,343	48.2	−10.2
National gain from Labor		Swing	N/A	

=== Balcatta ===
1986 Western Australian state election: Balcatta
Party	Candidate	Votes	%	±%
Labor	Ron Bertram	11,543	63.4	+0.4
Liberal	Vincenzo Alessandrino	6,654	36.6	−0.4
Total formal votes		18,197	96.6	+0.3
Informal votes		633	3.4	−0.3
Turnout		18,830	91.8	+3.8
Labor hold		Swing	+0.4	

=== Balga ===
1986 Western Australian state election: Balga
Party	Candidate	Votes	%	±%
Labor	Brian Burke	15,719	77.8	−1.2
Liberal	John Gordon	3,774	18.7	−2.3
Independent	William Nind	721	3.6	+3.6
Total formal votes		20,214	97.3	0.0
Informal votes		558	2.7	0.0
Turnout		20,772	91.9	+4.9
Two-party-preferred result
Labor	Brian Burke	16,090	79.6	+0.6
Liberal	John Gordon	4,124	20.4	−0.6
Labor hold		Swing	+0.6	

=== Bunbury ===
1986 Western Australian state election: Bunbury
Party	Candidate	Votes	%	±%
Labor	Phil Smith	4,531	54.6	+3.4
Liberal	John Sibson	3,644	43.9	−1.9
Independent	Alfred Bussell	131	1.6	+1.6
Total formal votes		8,306	97.8	+0.6
Informal votes		186	2.2	−0.6
Turnout		8,492	92.3	+1.4
Two-party-preferred result
Labor	Phil Smith	4,601	55.4	+2.7
Liberal	John Sibson	3,705	44.6	−2.7
Labor hold		Swing	+2.7	

=== Canning ===
1986 Western Australian state election: Canning
Party	Candidate	Votes	%	±%
Labor	Judyth Watson	11,365	65.8	+0.2
Liberal	Elkin Conway	5,918	34.2	−0.2
Total formal votes		17,283	3.2	0.0
Informal votes		575	3.2	0.0
Turnout		17,858	91.5	+4.0
Labor hold		Swing	+0.2	

=== Clontarf ===
1986 Western Australian state election: Clontarf
Party	Candidate	Votes	%	±%
Liberal	Tony Williams	8,538	58.1	+3.9
Labor	Kon Vatskalis	6,156	41.9	−3.9
Total formal votes		14,694	97.6	+0.1
Informal votes		357	2.4	−0.1
Turnout		15,051	91.5	+2.8
Liberal hold		Swing	+3.9	

=== Cockburn ===
1986 Western Australian state election: Cockburn
Party	Candidate	Votes	%	±%
Labor	Clive Hughes	15,328	74.7	−3.9
Liberal	Mark Iriks	5,202	25.3	+3.9
Total formal votes		20,530	96.1	+0.4
Informal votes		829	3.9	−0.4
Turnout		21,359	93.5	−0.7
Labor hold		Swing	−3.9	

=== Collie ===
1986 Western Australian state election: Collie
Party	Candidate	Votes	%	±%
Labor	Tom Jones	4,480	51.6	−14.0
National	Hilda Turnbull	2,509	28.9	−5.5
Liberal	John Davison	1,563	18.0	+18.0
Independent	Roy Bussell	131	1.5	+1.5
Total formal votes		8,683	97.9	+0.1
Informal votes		183	2.1	−0.1
Turnout		8,866	94.2	+2.1
Two-party-preferred result
Labor	Tom Jones	4,706	54.2	−11.4
National	Hilda Turnbull	3,977	45.8	+11.4
Labor hold		Swing	−11.4	

=== Cottesloe ===
1986 Western Australian state election: Cottesloe
Party	Candidate	Votes	%	±%
Liberal	Bill Hassell	9,451	58.2	+5.3
Labor	John Noonan	6,789	41.8	+2.2
Total formal votes		16,420	98.0	+0.1
Informal votes		338	2.0	−0.1
Turnout		16,578	89.1	+1.2
Liberal hold		Swing	+1.9	

=== Dale ===
1986 Western Australian state election: Dale
Party	Candidate	Votes	%	±%
Liberal	Cyril Rushton	5,547	49.8	+2.1
Labor	Philip Vincent	5,175	46.5	−1.4
Democrats	Mark Beadle	405	4.6	−0.8
Total formal votes		11,127	97.4	+0.3
Informal votes		293	2.6	−0.3
Turnout		11,420	92.9	+3.4
Two-party-preferred result
Liberal	Cyril Rushton	5,741	51.6	+1.5
Labor	Philip Vincent	5,386	48.4	−1.5
Liberal hold		Swing	+1.5	

=== Darling Range ===
1986 Western Australian state election: Darling Range
Party	Candidate	Votes	%	±%
Liberal	George Spriggs	5,116	52.3	−4.3
Labor	William McAtee	3,891	39.8	−3.6
Democrats	Richard Jeffreys	768	7.9	+7.9
Total formal votes		9,775	97.3	−0.3
Informal votes		267	2.7	+0.3
Turnout		10,042	92.4	+3.0
Two-party-preferred result
Liberal	George Spriggs	5,494	56.2	−0.4
Labor	William McAtee	4,281	43.8	+0.4
Liberal hold		Swing	−0.4	

=== East Melville ===
1986 Western Australian state election: East Melville
Party	Candidate	Votes	%	±%
Liberal	Richard Lewis	9,491	60.0	+6.4
Labor	Gary Low	6,330	40.0	+4.2
Total formal votes		15,821	97.7	−0.1
Informal votes		379	2.3	+0.1
Turnout		16,200	92.2	−1.5
Liberal hold		Swing	+1.1	

=== Esperance-Dundas ===
1986 Western Australian state election: Esperance-Dundas
Party	Candidate	Votes	%	±%
Labor	Julian Grill	5,829	57.1	+1.2
Liberal	Marie Wordsworth	4,379	42.9	+8.1
Total formal votes		10,208	97.4	+0.9
Informal votes		271	2.6	−0.9
Turnout		10,479	89.6	+2.7
Labor hold		Swing	−1.2	

=== Floreat ===
1986 Western Australian state election: Floreat
Party	Candidate	Votes	%	±%
Liberal	Andrew Mensaros	11,473	64.6	+10.0
Labor	Ian Bacon	6,289	35.4	−0.1
Total formal votes		17,762	97.8	−0.4
Informal votes		399	2.2	+0.4
Turnout		18,161	91.9	+2.8
Liberal hold		Swing	+5.0	

=== Fremantle ===
1986 Western Australian state election: Fremantle
Party	Candidate	Votes	%	±%
Labor	David Parker	9,784	65.0	−0.3
Liberal	Aileen Atkins	3,939	26.2	−3.5
Socialist Workers	Frank Noakes	777	5.2	+0.1
Independent	Wendy Schulze	548	3.6	+3.6
Total formal votes		15,048	95.6	+1.5
Informal votes		690	4.4	−1.5
Turnout		15,738	90.1	−1.6
Two-party-preferred result
Labor	David Parker	10,804	71.8	+2.7
Liberal	Aileen Aitkins	4,244	28.2	−2.7
Labor hold		Swing	+2.7	

=== Gascoyne ===
1986 Western Australian state election: Gascoyne
Party	Candidate	Votes	%	±%
Liberal	Ian Laurance	2,600	60.5	−1.3
Labor	Kevin Leahy	1,697	39.5	+1.3
Total formal votes		4,297	97.8	+0.5
Informal votes		96	2.2	−0.5
Turnout		4,393	85.9	+1.3
Liberal hold		Swing	−1.3	

=== Geraldton ===
1986 Western Australian state election: Geraldton
Party	Candidate	Votes	%	±%
Labor	Jeff Carr	4,676	50.4	−12.7
Liberal	Marjorie Tubby	4,609	49.6	+12.7
Total formal votes		9,285	97.7	−0.4
Informal votes		216	2.3	+0.4
Turnout		9,501	91.4	+2.6
Labor hold		Swing	−12.7	

Note: the Liberal candidate for Geraldton, Marjorie Tubby, was the wife of the sitting member for Greenough, Reg Tubby.

=== Gosnells ===
1986 Western Australian state election: Gosnells
Party	Candidate	Votes	%	±%
Labor	Yvonne Henderson	12,112	64.8	+3.4
Liberal	Michael Smith	6,588	35.2	−0.1
Total formal votes		18,700	97.5	+0.8
Informal votes		482	2.5	−0.8
Turnout		19,182	92.9	+3.9
Labor hold		Swing	+1.7	

=== Greenough ===
1986 Western Australian state election: Greenough
Party	Candidate	Votes	%	±%
Liberal	Reg Tubby	6,714	73.6	+2.8
Labor	David Ridley	2,410	26.4	−2.8
Total formal votes		9,124	97.4	+0.1
Informal votes		244	2.6	−0.1
Turnout		9,368	91.5	+1.6
Liberal hold		Swing	+2.8	

=== Helena ===
1986 Western Australian state election: Helena
Party	Candidate	Votes	%	±%
Labor	Gordon Hill	12,688	64.5	+0.8
Liberal	Beryl Joines	6,986	35.5	−0.8
Total formal votes		19,674	97.1	−0.1
Informal votes		584	2.9	+0.1
Turnout		20,258	92.6	0.0
Labor hold		Swing	+0.8	

=== Joondalup ===
1986 Western Australian state election: Joondalup
Party	Candidate	Votes	%	±%
Labor	Jackie Watkins	14,900	56.9	+0.2
Liberal	Mick Nanovich	9,973	38.1	−5.2
Independent	Vida Wright	848	3.2	+3.2
Democrats	Harry Frochter	478	1.8	+1.8
Total formal votes		26,199	97.6	−0.1
Informal votes		634	2.4	+0.1
Turnout		26,833	93.3	+3.5
Two-party-preferred result
Labor	Jackie Watkins	15,588	59.5	+2.8
Liberal	Mick Nanovich	10,611	40.5	−2.8
Labor hold		Swing	+2.8	

=== Kalamunda ===
1986 Western Australian state election: Kalamunda
Party	Candidate	Votes	%	±%
Liberal	Ian Thompson	5,555	58.9	+1.5
Labor	Jacqueline Jeffreys	3,873	41.1	+3.8
Total formal votes		9,428	98.0	+0.6
Informal votes		194	2.0	−0.6
Turnout		9,622	91.8	+2.9
Liberal hold		Swing	−1.2	

=== Kalgoorlie ===
1986 Western Australian state election: Kalgoorlie
Party	Candidate	Votes	%	±%
Labor	Ian Taylor	7,743	80.1	+8.5
Independent	Stephanie Farrell	1,927	19.9	+19.9
Total formal votes		9,670	96.6	0.0
Informal votes		341	3.4	0.0
Turnout		10,011	89.5	−1.2
Labor hold		Swing	+6.0	

=== Karrinyup ===
1986 Western Australian state election: Karrinyup
Party	Candidate	Votes	%	±%
Liberal	Jim Clarko	11,163	56.3	+3.8
Labor	Ian Noack	8,649	43.7	+3.0
Total formal votes		19,812	98.0	+0.1
Informal votes		410	2.0	−0.1
Turnout		20,222	92.8	+3.5
Liberal hold		Swing	+0.4	

=== Katanning-Roe ===
1986 Western Australian state election: Katanning-Roe
Party	Candidate	Votes	%	±%
National	Monty House	4,179	47.4	−34.7
Liberal	Dick Old	3,196	36.3	+36.3
Labor	Jonathan Davies	1,438	16.3	−1.6
Total formal votes		8,813	98.6	+0.9
Informal votes		127	1.4	−0.9
Turnout		8,940	93.5	+4.0
Two-candidate-preferred result
National	Monty House	5,389	61.2	−20.9
Liberal	Dick Old	3,424	38.8	+38.8
National hold		Swing	−20.9	

=== Kimberley ===
1986 Western Australian state election: Kimberley
Party	Candidate	Votes	%	±%
Labor	Ernie Bridge	8,592	66.5	+0.6
Liberal	William Shepherd	4,323	33.5	−0.6
Total formal votes		12,915	96.7	+2.3
Informal votes		439	3.3	−2.3
Turnout		13,354	74.5	−9.8
Labor hold		Swing	+0.6	

=== Mandurah ===
1986 Western Australian state election: Mandurah
Party	Candidate	Votes	%	±%
Labor	John Read	6,449	56.4	+9.6
Liberal	Wayne McRostie	4,361	38.1	−9.9
Democrats	George Counsel	628	5.5	+5.5
Total formal votes		11,438	98.2	−0.2
Informal votes		209	1.8	+0.2
Turnout		11,647	94.0	+2.1
Two-party-preferred result
Labor	John Read	6,794	59.4	+9.1
Liberal	Wayne McRostie	4,644	40.6	−9.1
Labor hold		Swing	+9.1	

=== Maylands ===
1986 Western Australian state election: Maylands
Party	Candidate	Votes	%	±%
Labor	Peter Dowding	9,393	59.8	−5.1
Liberal	Michael MacAulay	4,728	30.1	−5.0
Independent	David MacLiver	855	5.4	+5.4
Democrats	Peter Hayes	474	3.0	+3.0
Independent	Clive Turner	141	0.9	+0.9
Independent	Michael Pal	127	0.8	+0.8
Total formal votes		15,718	96.1	−1.0
Informal votes		634	3.9	+1.0
Turnout		16,352	91.4	+4.6
Two-party-preferred result
Labor	Peter Dowding	10,547	67.1	+2.2
Liberal	Michael MacAulay	4,728	30.1	−2.2
Labor hold		Swing	+2.2	

=== Melville ===
1986 Western Australian state election: Melville
Party	Candidate	Votes	%	±%
Labor	Barry Hodge	12,642	69.5	−1.7
Liberal	Eric Zumbo	5,550	30.5	+1.7
Total formal votes		18,192	97.0	−0.3
Informal votes		567	3.0	+0.3
Turnout		18,759	92.5	−0.4
Labor hold		Swing	−1.7	

=== Merredin ===
1986 Western Australian state election: Merredin
Party	Candidate	Votes	%	±%
National	Hendy Cowan	5,490	64.7	+4.0
Labor	Salvatore Musca	1,651	19.4	+19.4
Liberal	Bruce Harvey	1,351	15.9	+2.6
Total formal votes		8,492	98.4	+1.3
Informal votes		136	1.6	−1.3
Turnout		8,628	95.1	+4.6
Two-party-preferred result
National	Hendy Cowan	6,709	79.0	+14.0
Labor	Salvatore Musca	1,783	21.0	+21.0
National hold		Swing	+14.0	

=== Mitchell ===
1986 Western Australian state election: Mitchell
Party	Candidate	Votes	%	±%
Labor	David Smith	6,376	60.0	+3.1
Liberal	Trevor Slater	4,243	40.0	−3.1
Total formal votes		10,619	98.1	+0.5
Informal votes		205	1.9	−0.5
Turnout		10,824	93.0	+0.9
Labor hold		Swing	+3.1	

=== Moore ===
1986 Western Australian state election: Moore
Party	Candidate	Votes	%	±%
Liberal	Bert Crane	6,218	59.5	+33.6
Labor	Nicholas Agocs	2,400	23.0	+1.5
National	Frank Creagh	1,823	17.5	+17.5
Total formal votes		10,441	98.0	+0.5
Informal votes		216	2.0	−0.5
Turnout		10,657	93.3	+3.4
Two-party-preferred result
Liberal	Bert Crane	7,779	74.5	+37.8
Labor	Nicholas Agocs	2,662	25.5	+25.5
Liberal gain from National		Swing	N/A	

=== Morley-Swan ===
1986 Western Australian state election: Morley-Swan
Party	Candidate	Votes	%	±%
Labor	Arthur Tonkin	13,440	66.9	−2.2
Liberal	Christine Fisher	6,659	33.1	+4.6
Total formal votes		20,099	96.7	+1.7
Informal votes		675	3.3	−1.7
Turnout		20,774	92.2	+3.4
Labor hold		Swing	−4.0	

=== Mount Lawley ===
1986 Western Australian state election: Mount Lawley
Party	Candidate	Votes	%	±%
Liberal	George Cash	8,615	52.1	−0.9
Labor	Kenneth Withers	7,914	47.9	+2.4
Total formal votes		16,529	97.5	+0.7
Informal votes		431	2.5	−0.7
Turnout		16,960	92.8	+5.2
Liberal hold		Swing	−1.3	

=== Mount Marshall ===
1986 Western Australian state election: Mount Marshall
Party	Candidate	Votes	%	±%
Liberal	Bill McNee	3,596	44.0	+11.0
National	Mort Schell	3,220	39.4	+16.3
Labor	Robert Couzens	1,358	16.6	−0.4
Total formal votes		8,174	98.5	+0.9
Informal votes		125	1.5	−0.9
Turnout		8,299	93.8	+4.0
Two-candidate-preferred result
National	Mort Schell	4,357	53.3	+9.0
Liberal	Bill McNee	3,817	46.7	−9.0
National gain from Liberal		Swing	+9.0	

=== Mundaring ===
1986 Western Australian state election: Mundaring
Party	Candidate	Votes	%	±%
Labor	Gavan Troy	5,170	53.2	+5.2
Liberal	Steven Hart	4,150	42.7	−5.6
Democrats	Rodney Gibbs	398	4.1	+0.5
Total formal votes		9,718	98.1	+0.6
Informal votes		190	1.9	−0.6
Turnout		9,908	91.2	+1.9
Two-party-preferred result
Labor	Gavan Troy	5,374	55.3	+5.2
Liberal	Steven Hart	4,344	44.7	−5.2
Labor hold		Swing	+5.2	

=== Murchison-Eyre ===
1986 Western Australian state election: Murchison-Eyre
Party	Candidate	Votes	%	±%
Liberal	Ross Lightfoot	1,124	41.2	−8.1
Labor	Christopher Sweeney	956	35.1	−9.3
Independent	Aubrey Lynch	189	6.9	+6.9
Independent	Neil Dimer	158	5.8	+5.8
Independent	Cyril Barnes	153	5.6	+5.6
Independent	John Ford	147	5.4	+5.4
Total formal votes		2,727	94.8	−1.2
Informal votes		150	5.2	+1.2
Turnout		2,877	77.7	+0.9
Two-party-preferred result
Liberal	Ross Lightfoot	1,411	51.7	+0.4
Labor	Christopher Sweeney	1,316	48.3	−0.4
Liberal hold		Swing	+0.4	

=== Murdoch ===
1986 Western Australian state election: Murdoch
Party	Candidate	Votes	%	±%
Liberal	Barry MacKinnon	13,600	50.8	−2.4
Labor	Mark Johnson	12,385	46.3	+1.1
Independent	Anthony Greatwood	515	1.9	+1.9
Independent	Orland Bertocchi	275	1.0	+1.0
Total formal votes		26,775	98.0	+0.1
Informal votes		545	2.0	−0.1
Turnout		27,320	93.3	+2.2
Two-party-preferred result
Liberal	Barry MacKinnon	14,003	52.3	−1.7
Labor	Mark Johnson	12,772	48.7	+1.7
Liberal hold		Swing	−1.7	

=== Murray-Wellington ===
1986 Western Australian state election: Murray-Wellington
Party	Candidate	Votes	%	±%
Liberal	John Bradshaw	6,119	59.8	+3.1
Labor	Terrence Caraher	4,112	40.2	−0.1
Total formal votes		10,231	97.8	+0.5
Informal votes		233	2.2	−0.5
Turnout		10,464	93.2	+2.4
Liberal hold		Swing	+1.6	

=== Narrogin ===
1986 Western Australian state election: Narrogin
Party	Candidate	Votes	%	±%
National	Cambell Nalder	3,690	43.0	−57.0
Liberal	Peter Jones	3,319	38.7	+38.7
Labor	Wayne White	1,576	18.4	+18.4
Total formal votes		8,585	98.4	
Informal votes		138	1.6	
Turnout		8,723	94.2	
Two-candidate-preferred result
National	Cambell Nalder	5,071	59.1	−40.9
Liberal	Peter Jones	3,514	40.9	+40.9
National hold		Swing	−40.9	

=== Nedlands ===
1986 Western Australian state election: Nedlands
Party	Candidate	Votes	%	±%
Liberal	Richard Court	9,886	64.9	+0.8
Labor	Ross Williamson	5,341	35.1	−0.8
Total formal votes		15,227	97.7	−0.3
Informal votes		357	2.3	+0.3
Turnout		15,584	89.1	+0.4
Liberal hold		Swing	+0.8	

=== Nollamara ===
1986 Western Australian state election: Nollamara
Party	Candidate	Votes	%	±%
Labor	Keith Wilson	9,490	59.9	−1.4
Liberal	Wouterina Klein	6,352	40.1	+1.4
Total formal votes		15,842	97.6	0.0
Informal votes		388	2.4	0.0
Turnout		16,230	93.3	+4.3
Labor hold		Swing	−1.4	

=== Perth ===
1986 Western Australian state election: Perth
Party	Candidate	Votes	%	±%
Labor	Terry Burke	9,644	63.3	−4.5
Liberal	Peter Evans	5,090	33.4	+1.2
Independent	Michael Crossing	510	3.3	+3.3
Total formal votes		15,244	95.3	−0.2
Informal votes		746	4.7	+0.2
Turnout		15,990	87.6	+6.9
Two-party-preferred result
Labor	Terry Burke	9,893	64.9	−2.9
Liberal	Peter Evans	5,351	35.1	+2.9
Labor hold		Swing	−2.9	

=== Pilbara ===
1986 Western Australian state election: Pilbara
Party	Candidate	Votes	%	±%
Labor	Pam Buchanan	7,965	64.7	+5.9
Liberal	Johannes Van Uden	4,351	35.3	+0.4
Total formal votes		12,316	97.6	+2.8
Informal votes		306	2.4	−2.8
Turnout		12,622	84.0	−7.3
Labor hold		Swing	−2.8	

=== Rockingham ===
1986 Western Australian state election: Rockingham
Party	Candidate	Votes	%	±%
Labor	Mike Barnett	12,407	62.9	−6.8
Liberal	Robert Douglas	6,633	33.6	+3.3
Independent	Patricia Todd	676	3.4	+3.4
Total formal votes		19,716	97.4	−0.6
Informal votes		516	2.6	+0.6
Turnout		20,232	92.4	+1.5
Two-party-preferred result
Labor	Mike Barnett	12,737	64.6	−5.1
Liberal	Robert Douglas	6,979	35.4	+5.1
Labor hold		Swing	−5.1	

=== Scarborough ===
1986 Western Australian state election: Scarborough
Party	Candidate	Votes	%	±%
Labor	Graham Burkett	8,846	55.9	+0.2
Liberal	Frances Grierson	5,642	35.7	−8.6
Independent	Barbara Churchward	691	4.4	+4.4
Democrats	Charles Hall	644	4.1	+4.1
Total formal votes		15,823	97.5	−0.5
Informal votes		410	2.5	+0.5
Turnout		16,233	90.9	+3.9
Two-party-preferred result
Labor	Graham Burkett	9,541	60.3	+4.6
Liberal	Frances Grierson	6,282	39.7	−4.6
Labor hold		Swing	+4.6	

=== South Perth ===
1986 Western Australian state election: South Perth
Party	Candidate	Votes	%	±%
Liberal	Bill Grayden	8,921	56.5	+2.0
Labor	Jennifer McNae	6,871	43.5	−2.0
Total formal votes		15,792	97.9	−0.1
Informal votes		345	2.1	+0.1
Turnout		16,137	89.7	+3.8
Liberal hold		Swing	+2.0	

=== Stirling ===
1986 Western Australian state election: Stirling
Party	Candidate	Votes	%	±%
National	Matt Stephens	5,670	62.2	+8.6
Liberal	Peter Skinner	3,443	37.8	+1.6
Total formal votes		9,113	97.2	+0.1
Informal votes		255	2.8	−0.1
Turnout		9,368	93.7	+2.8
National hold		Swing	+6.1	

=== Subiaco ===
1986 Western Australian state election: Subiaco
Party	Candidate	Votes	%	±%
Labor	Carmen Lawrence	7,949	50.2	+1.8
Liberal	Ross McLean	7,403	46.7	−1.7
Independent	Geoff Stuart	488	3.1	+3.1
Total formal votes		15,840	97.5	−0.2
Informal votes		400	2.5	+0.2
Turnout		16,240	89.7	+4.3
Two-party-preferred result
Labor	Carmen Lawrence	8,189	51.7	+3.3
Liberal	Ross McLean	7,651	48.3	−3.3
Labor gain from Liberal		Swing	+3.3	

=== Vasse ===
1986 Western Australian state election: Vasse
Party	Candidate	Votes	%	±%
Liberal	Barry Blaikie	6,359	63.5	+4.0
Labor	Laurie Watson	3,648	36.5	+5.4
Total formal votes		10,007	98.1	+0.3
Informal votes		195	1.9	−0.3
Turnout		10,202	94.3	+1.9
Liberal hold		Swing	−0.7	

=== Victoria Park ===
1986 Western Australian state election: Victoria Park
Party	Candidate	Votes	%	±%
Labor	Ron Davies	9,335	64.9	−2.2
Liberal	Diane Airey	5,050	35.1	+2.2
Total formal votes		14,385	97.1	0.0
Informal votes		434	2.9	0.0
Turnout		14,819	90.2	+5.1
Labor hold		Swing	−2.2	

=== Warren ===
1986 Western Australian state election: Warren
Party	Candidate	Votes	%	±%
Labor	David Evans	4,140	51.2	−9.6
Liberal	Paul Omodei	3,671	45.4	+14.6
Independent	Charles Parke	272	3.4	+3.4
Total formal votes		8,083	98.0	+0.6
Informal votes		162	2.0	−0.6
Turnout		8,245	94.1	+2.8
Two-party-preferred result
Labor	David Evans	4,276	52.9	−10.5
Liberal	Paul Omodei	3,807	47.1	+10.5
Labor hold		Swing	−10.5	

=== Welshpool ===
1986 Western Australian state election: Welshpool
Party	Candidate	Votes	%	±%
Labor	Bill Thomas	10,073	63.2	−1.6
Liberal	Stephen Gardiner	5,872	36.8	+1.6
Total formal votes		15,945	95.9	−0.6
Informal votes		683	4.1	+0.6
Turnout		16,628	91.8	+4.0
Labor hold		Swing	−1.6	

=== Whitford ===
1986 Western Australian state election: Whitford
Party	Candidate	Votes	%	±%
Labor	Pam Beggs	12,637	56.5	−1.2
Liberal	Kenneth Schulz	8,318	37.2	−5.1
Democrats	Graeme Major	1,397	6.3	+6.3
Total formal votes		22,352	98.1	0.0
Informal votes		425	1.9	0.0
Turnout		22,777	92.5	+3.9
Two-party-preferred result
Labor	Pam Beggs	13,366	59.8	+2.1
Liberal	Kenneth Schulz	8,986	40.2	−2.1
Labor hold		Swing	+2.1	

== See also ==
- Results of the Western Australian state election, 1986 (Legislative Council)
- 1986 Western Australian state election
- Candidates of the Western Australian state election, 1986
- Members of the Western Australian Legislative Assembly, 1986–1989
