= Herbert R. Robinson =

Australian politician

Herbert Robinson

Member of the Legislative Council of Western Australia
- In office 22 May 1962 – 21 May 1965 Serving with Arthur Griffith; Ruby Hutchison
- Preceded by: George Jeffery
- Succeeded by: None (abolished)
- Constituency: Suburban
- In office 22 May 1965 – 21 May 1968 Serving with Arthur Griffith
- Preceded by: None (new creation)
- Succeeded by: Roy Claughton
- Constituency: North Metropolitan

Personal details
- Born: 19 April 1909 Maylands, Western Australia, Australia
- Died: 11 July 1990 (aged 81) Canberra, Australia
- Party: Liberal
- Other political affiliations: Independent (1956)

Herbert Richard Robinson (19 April 1909 – 11 July 1990) was an Australian politician who served in the Legislative Council of Western Australia from 1962 to 1968, representing the Liberal Party.

Robinson was born in Perth to Mary Ellen (née Englett) and Richard Herbert Robinson. His father was killed in action in France when he was eight years old, in April 1918. Robinson attended St Patrick's Boys' School, and after leaving school worked for a period as a clerk for the Western Australian Government Railways. In 1933, he and his sister opened the Roxy Gardens, a 900-seater outdoor theatre in Maylands. The following year, the Robinsons took over the nearby Lyric Theatre, which had been built in 1928 by Thomas Coombe. They remained owners of both theatres until their eventual closure in the early 1960s, with Robinson serving as president of the Motion Picture Exhibitors' Association of Western Australia from 1951 to 1956.

Robinson enlisted in the Australian Army during World War II, and by the end of the war was a class-one warrant officer. He was elected to the Perth Road Board (now the City of Stirling) in 1951, and from 1959 to 1961 served as its chairman. When the Perth Road Board became the Shire of Perth in 1961, he was elected shire president, serving in the position until he left the council in 1963. In 1956, Robinson unsuccessfully stood as an independent candidate for the Legislative Assembly, gaining 20.4 percent of the vote in the seat of Maylands. He joined the Liberal Party the following year, and was elected to the Legislative Council in 1962, representing the three-member Suburban Province. In 1965, the existing Legislative Council provinces were abolished, and replaced by new two-member provinces. Robinson was appointed to the new North Metropolitan Province, serving a three-year term. He contested the seat in 1968, but lost to Labor's Roy Claughton. In retirement, Robinson moved to Canberra, dying there in July 1990, aged 81.

== See also ==
- List of mayors of Stirling
