= Roy Potts =

Australian soldier and educator

- Roy E. Potts c 1936
- Born: Roy Edred Potts
- Occupations: Teacher, headmaster, soldier
- Awards: Military Cross with 1 bar

Roy Edred Potts was an Australian teacher, headmaster, and Captain in the Australian Imperial Force. Potts served in World War I where as a lieutenant he was twice awarded the Military Cross in mid and late 1918. After the war, Potts returned to teaching in Western Australia, serving as headmaster of Wagin State School, Albany Central School and Boulder Central School before he became the headmaster of Perth Boys' School. Potts served as headmaster of the historic boys' school from 1936 to 1943.

== Early life ==
Potts was born in Adelaide, South Australia in 1899. He was the son of a minister, the Reverend George Potts, and his wife, Ada Patterson Potts. The family moved to Western Australia and Potts grew up in Jarrahdale.

== Career ==
Potts first became a monitor, serving as a junior monitor at Midland Junction. He then attended Teachers Training College from 1905 to 1907. Potts became an assistant teacher, serving at numerous schools, including Perth Boys' School.

Potts served in World War I with the 48th battalion. He was awarded the Military Cross in May 1918, for conspicuous gallantry and devotion to duty, for his actions at Dernancourt, when he led two platoons under heavy fire and then crossed open terrain to deliver a message. A bar was added to his Military Cross for his actions at Proyart leading his company and a party in the capture of 60 men and 5 machine guns. Potts rose to the rank of captain. After he returned to Australia, Potts continued to participate in the activities of the Returned Services Association.

Potts obtained a bachelor of science degree from the University of Western Australia at Perth in 1924.

He served headmaster of Albany Central School from at least 1930 until 1934. In 1931, a man impersonated Potts at 3 establishments to obtain goods on credit; Potts' namesake was arrested and sentenced to 3 months imprisonment.

In February 1934, he became headmaster of Boulder Central School. He had also served previously as headmaster of Wagin State School.

In January 1936, he became headmaster of Perth Boys' School following the death of Thomas C. Chandler. Potts served as headmaster of the Perth Boys' School from 1936 to 1943. After the Japanese attack on Pearl Harbor, the decision was made to move the boys from the school's campus on St James Street, near the central railway station, and split them up over 11 locations in the suburbs. Potts oversaw the boys across Greater Perth from 1941 to 1943.

== Death ==
Potts developed high blood pressure, took sick leave, appeared to recover, but then died suddenly days before returning to work. He died in Nedlands on 12 October 1943. He was 53.
