= John Caldwell (Western Australian politician) =

Australian politician

The Honourable John Caldwell

Member of the Legislative Council of Western Australia
- In office 22 May 1986 – 21 May 1989
- Preceded by: Thomas Knight
- Succeeded by: None (seat abolished)
- Constituency: South Province
- In office 22 May 1989 – 21 May 1993 Serving with Brown, Chance, Charlton, McAleer, Wordsworth
- Constituency: Agricultural Region

Personal details
- Born: 19 December 1934 Katanning, Western Australia
- Died: 2 August 2000 (aged 65) Perth, Western Australia
- Party: National

John Norman Caldwell (19 December 1934 – 2 August 2000) was an Australian farmer and politician who served as a National Party member of the Legislative Council of Western Australia from 1986 to 1993.

Caldwell was born in Katanning, in Western Australia's Great Southern region. He boarded at Scotch College, Perth, and after leaving school returned to work on the family farm in Badgebup, which he eventually took over.

Caldwell became prominent in agricultural circles, and also represented Western Australia in rifle shooting on five occasions. He entered parliament at the 1986 state election, defeating Thomas Knight (the sitting Liberal member) in South Province. At the 1989 state election, following electoral reform, Caldwell was elected to the new five-member Agricultural Region. He served as deputy chairman of committees in the Legislative Council from 1988 to 1993 and as a National Party shadow minister from 1989 to 1992, eventually retiring from parliament at the 1993 election.

Caldwell married Francine May Bignell in 1960, and had three children. He died in Perth in August 2000, aged 65.
