= Perth Boys' School =

Defunct Australian government boys' school (1847–1958)

Coordinates: 31.9498°S 115.8602°E

Perth Boys School is a defunct state boys' school that operated in Perth, Western Australia for over 100 years, from 1847 to 1958. It was, during its time, the oldest boys school in Australia.

== History ==
=== Forerunner ===
Before 1847, there were a number of private schools in Perth, however, only one government primary school, a co-ed school known as the Colonial School (1830–1847). This school was the precursor to both the Perth Boys' and Girls' Schools.

In 1847, Lt Gov. Irwin set up an Education Committee to look into the matter of schooling in the city. The committee found only two-thirds of the city's children were going to school, of the children who were going to school, a fraction went to the Colonial School but, those that did, didn't always attend regularly. The Committee determined that two schools should be established, a school for boys and a school for girls, to replace the Colonial School.

=== Establishment ===
The Boys' and Girls' Schools were established on 20 Sept 1847. (Note: It is worth noting that, for many years, the Perth Boys' School was thought to have begun in 1845; the date was even on the school's crest. While researching a book to mark the school's upcoming centenary, Ewers determined that the school opened in 1847 and the centenary was pushed out.) W. Dacres Williams was appointed first master of the Boys' School.

=== Names ===
The school was initially known as the Boys' School. By about 1848, it started to be called Perth Boys School.

However, it was referred to informally as the Perth Colonial Boys School, the Government Boys' School, Perth, the Perth Boys Central School, the Perth Central School (a name that referred to both the Boys' and Girls' Schools). From 1946 to 1958, the school was called the Perth Boys' High School.

There was also an earlier Roman Catholic school described in colonial records as the Perth Boys' School.

=== Later years ===
Perth Boys' School celebrated its centenary in 1947. Before it closed in 1958, the school was thought to be the oldest boys school in the country.

== Location ==
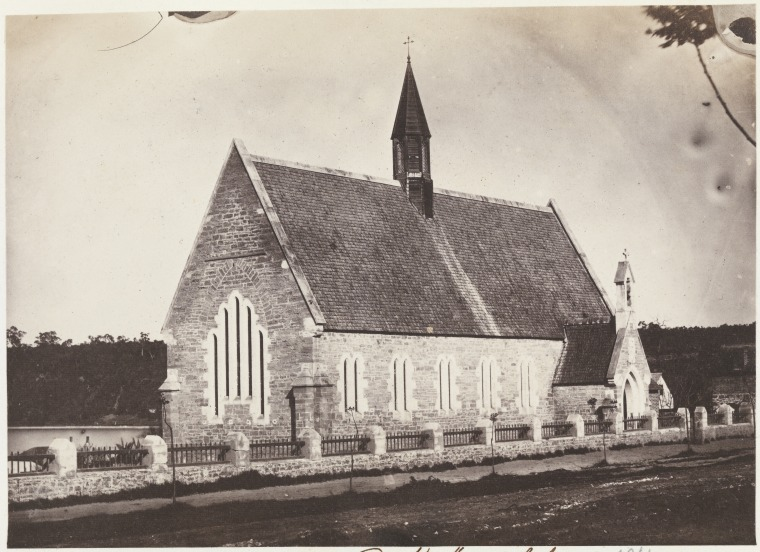
Perth Boys School, c 1861

The school was temporarily house in the local Court House when it opened in 1847. The venue wasn't ideal as the children had to move whenever court was in session. The school leased the Wesleyan Church's old school house for three years, but moved to the Swan River Mechanic's Institute after two, before moving to the purpose-built building at St George's Terrace, which was completed about 1854. The school remained at St George's Terrace until 1896, having outgrown its location.

Both the Perth Boys' and Girls' Schools moved to a complex on St James Street in 1896. In St James Street, the schools were centrally-located near the Western Australian Museum, the Art Gallery of Western Australia, the State Library of Western Australia, and the Perth railway station.

=== Today ===
The Old Perth Boys School building in St George's Terrace became a part of Curtin University in 2016. The St James Street site is home to the Perth Institute of Contemporary Arts.

== Academics ==
In late 1800s, Australian universities, including the University of Sydney, University of Melbourne, University of Western Australia and University of Adelaide set primary school, secondary school, and senior (leaving) examinations for school students. The senior examinations being used as entry exams for university.

In 1899, Perth Boys' School starting preparing its pupils for the University of Adelaide's examinations.

== Activities ==
In 1929, the school won the annual Steward Shield.

== Headmasters ==
- Dacres Williams (1847–1853)
- Mr. Johnson, formerly head of Guildford school
- Mr. Charlesworth
- R. C. Hayes
- William Adkinson
- Christopher Trotter, from Borough Road School, South London
- William Bell (1891–1896)
- W. J. Rooney (1896–1900), previously principal of the Teacher's College; also, married to Dacres Williams' granddaughter
- Wallace Clubb (1901–1903) later Director of Education for the state
- James A. Klein (1903–1904) later a school inspector and Director of Education
- Joseph Parsons (1905–1910), left to become head of Perth Modern School
- Ernest Harris (1912)
- Charles W. Hadley (1910–1912), later a school inspector
- Thomas Charles Chandler (1913–1936)
- Roy E. Potts (1937–1943), served in the AIF, awarded the Military Cross with one bar
- Cyril A. Glew (1944– ) also an old boy of the school

== Alumni (old boys) ==
- Arthur Griffith, politician
- Arthur James Hillman, soldier and civil engineer
- Athelstan Saw, politician
- Charles Court, politician
- Don Cooley, politician
- Don May, politician
- Dost Mahomet, merchant
- Doug Cash, politician
- Edward Oldfield, politician
- Edwin Corboy, politician
- Geoff Grewar, politician
- George Jeffery (politician)
- George Odgers, soldier and journalis
- Gordon Becker, cricketer
- Hal Missingham, artist
- Howard Raphael, politician
- Len Hamilton, politician
- Leonidas Bott, cricketer
- Mel Whinnen, Aussie rules footballer
- Norm Baxter, politician
- Ralph Honner, army officer
- Ronald Harvey (administrator)
- Roy Claughton, politician
- Sammy Clarke, Aussie rules footballer
- Thomas Wardle, politician
- Tom Hungerford, writer
- Walter James, politician

== Notable faculty ==
- Alfred Carson, assistant master
- Bobby Despotovski, soccer coach
- Dorothy Shea, librarian
- John K. Ewers, teacher
- James Albert Miles, head teacher
