= Lionel Kelly =

Australian politician

Member of the Legislative Assembly of Western Australia
- In office 9 August 1941 – 25 March 1950
- Preceded by: George Lambert
- Succeeded by: None (abolished)
- Constituency: Yilgarn-Coolgardie
- In office 25 March 1950 – 23 March 1968
- Preceded by: None (new seat)
- Succeeded by: Jack Stewart
- Constituency: Merredin-Yilgarn

Personal details
- Born: 10 December 1896 Perth, Western Australia
- Died: 16 April 1977 (aged 80) Perth, Western Australia, Australia
- Party: Labor (from 1946)
- Other political affiliations: Independent (to 1946)

Lionel Francis Kelly (10 December 1896 – 16 April 1977) was an Australian politician who was a member of the Legislative Assembly of Western Australia from 1941 to 1968. He was initially elected as an independent, but in 1946 joined the Labor Party. He served as a minister in the government of Albert Hawke from 1953 to 1959.

== Early life ==
Kelly was born in Perth to Margaret Ann (née Campbell) and John Kelly. He attended Christian Brothers' College, Perth, and after leaving school went to the Gascoyne, managing a station near Gascoyne Junction. He served on the Upper Gascoyne Road Board from 1927 to 1928. Kelly later moved to Bullfinch, a small town in the eastern Wheatbelt, where he ran a store. He was elected to the Yilgarn Road Board in 1929, and would serve until 1943.

== Politics ==
Kelly first stood for parliament at the 1939 state election, as an "independent Labor" candidate, but was defeated in the seat of Yilgarn-Coolgardie by the endorsed Labor candidate, George Lambert. Lambert died in office in June 1941, and Kelly won the resulting by-election as an Independent Country candidate. At the 1943 state election, Kelly was re-elected to Yilgarn-Coolgardie as a plain independent. However, he joined the Labor Party in July 1946, and was re-elected unopposed as a Labor candidate at the 1947 state election.

At the 1950 election, Kelly's seat was abolished, and he transferred to the new seat of Merredin-Yilgarn. After Labor's victory at the 1953 election, he was made Minister for Mines and Minister for Fisheries in the new ministry formed by Albert Hawke. He was also made Minister for Industrial Development in 1954. In a reshuffle in December 1957, he lost the mines and industrial development portfolios, but was made Minister for Lands and Minister for Agriculture. The Labor government was defeated at the 1959 state election. Kelly remained in parliament until his retirement at the 1968 election. Merredin-Yilgarn had become increasingly marginal, and the replacement Labor candidate, Jim Brown, was defeated by the Liberal Party's Jack Stewart (although Labor reclaimed the seat three years later).

== Later life ==
After leaving parliament, Kelly served on the board of various mining firms. He died in Perth in April 1977, aged 80. Kelly was married twice, firstly in 1924 to Inez Marie Jackson, with whom he had three children. He was widowed in 1931, and remarried in 1934 to Eva Florence Roberts, with whom he had another four children.

Parliament of Western Australia
Preceded by George Lambert	Member for Yilgarn-Coolgardie; 1941–1950	Abolished
New seat	Member for Merredin-Yilgarn; 1950–1968	Succeeded by Jack Stewart
Political offices
Preceded by Charles Simpson	Minister for Mines; 1953–1957	Succeeded by Arthur Moir
Preceded by Arthur Abbott	Minister for Fisheries; 1953–1959	Succeeded by Ross Hutchinson
Preceded by Albert Hawke	Minister for Industrial Development; 1954–1957	Succeeded by Albert Hawke
Preceded by Ernest Hoar	Minister for Lands; 1957–1959	Succeeded by Stewart Bovell
Preceded by Ernest Hoar	Minister for Agriculture; 1957–1959	Succeeded by Crawford Nalder
