= Jack Stewart (Western Australian politician) =

Australian politician

Member of the Legislative Assembly of Western Australia
- In office 23 March 1968 – 20 February 1971
- Preceded by: Lionel Kelly
- Succeeded by: Jim Brown
- Constituency: Merredin-Yilgarn

Personal details
- Born: 15 April 1912 Perth, Western Australia
- Died: 5 November 1998 (aged 86) Myaree, Western Australia
- Party: Liberal

Jack McKay Stewart (15 April 1912 – 5 November 1998) was an Australian farmer and politician who was a Liberal Party member of the Legislative Assembly of Western Australia from 1968 to 1971, representing the seat of Merredin-Yilgarn.

Stewart was born in Perth to Isabella (née Carmichael) and Alexander Stewart. He attended Scotch College, but left school at the age of 15 to help manage the family farm at Bruce Rock. Stewart took over the farm completely in 1939. He was prominent in local agricultural circles, and served on the Bruce Rock Shire Council from 1946 to 1963, including as shire president from 1952. Stewart first stood for parliament at the 1965 state election, but lost to the sitting Labor member, Lionel Kelly. He recontested Merredin-Yilgarn in 1968, following Kelly's retirement, and was elected. Stewart's time in parliament was short-lived, however, as he was defeated by Labor's Jim Brown at the 1971 election. He retired to Perth in 1977, and died there in November 1998, aged 86. He had married Isobel Lillian Haldane in 1944, with whom he had two children.

Parliament of Western Australia
| Preceded by Lionel Kelly | Member for Merredin-Yilgarn; 1968–1971 | Succeeded by Jim Brown |
