= Lyla Elliott =

Australian politician (1934–2017)

The Honourable Lyla Elliott

Member of the Legislative Council for North-East Metropolitan
- In office 22 May 1971 – 21 May 1986 Serving with William Willesee (1971–1974); Don Cooley (1974–1980); Joe Berinson (1980–1983); Fred McKenzie (1983–1986)

Personal details
- Born: 2 July 1934 Geraldton, Western Australia
- Died: 18 February 2017 (aged 82) Nedlands, Western Australia
- Party: Labor
- Education: Edith Cowan University

Lyla Daphne Elliott (2 July 1934 – 18 February 2017) was an Australian politician who was a Labor member of the Legislative Council of Western Australia between 1971 and 1986, representing North-East Metropolitan Province.

Born in Geraldton to Alvie Jean (née Fullwood) and Albert James Elliott, Elliott attended state schools in Reedy and Waroona, two small country towns where her father was employed as a machinist. She became a member of the Labor Party in 1955, and was secretary to Joe Chamberlain, the general secretary of the party's WA branch, for almost 20 years. She also undertook work for the party's National Executive and at national conferences, and was also briefly employed by the UK Labour Party. Elliott unsuccessfully stood for the Legislative Assembly seat of Floreat at the 1968 election, gaining only 35.4% of the two-party-preferred vote against the Liberal candidate, Andrew Mensaros. At the 1971 election, she replaced the retiring Ruby Hutchison in the Legislative Council. Elliott was only the second woman elected to the Legislative Council (after Hutchison, who had been influential in securing her preselection), and, until June Craig was elected to the Legislative Assembly in 1974, was the only woman in parliament.

In parliament, Elliott was a member of several committees, including the Royal Commission that resulted in the passing of the Alcohol and Drug Authority Act 1974. She was chairperson of the parliamentary Labor Party from 1978 to 1986, the first woman in the position, and was particularly active in Labor Party policy committees. During the Burke Government, she chaired a taskforce on domestic violence, with a number of its recommendations subsequently enshrined in legislation. Elliott introduced several private member's bills to parliament, though few passed. One exception was an amendment to the Prevention of Cruelty to Animals Act 1920, requested by the RSPCA, which expanded the provisions relating to the abandonment of domestic animals. Elliott was also a member of People for Nuclear Disarmament, and unsuccessfully opposed the introduction of uranium mining legislation in 1978. Although very active in parliament's committee system, she was often critical of parliamentary procedure, particularly what she regarded as its unnecessarily long sitting hours. Elliott was an advocate of the abolition of the Legislative Council in favour of an expanded unicameral Legislative Assembly, a longstanding Labor position that was never implemented.

Although there was support for Elliott's promotion to the ministry following Labor's success at the 1983 state election, no position was forthcoming. Following an electoral redistribution carried out by the Labor government, she was given only a half-term of three years, while Fred McKenzie, the other North-East Metropolitan MLC, was selected for a full six-year term. She opted not to renominate at the 1986 election, with Tom Butler replacing her. Elliott remained involved in various community organisations after her retirement, and also studied history at Edith Cowan University (ECU), subsequently authoring several publications on the history of the Perth Hills region. She married Edwin John "Jack" White in May 1976. As a member of the Legislative Council for more than ten years, Elliott retained the style "The Honourable" at the end of her parliamentary service.

== See also ==
- Women in the Western Australian Legislative Council
