= Jim Brown (Western Australian politician) =

Western Australian politician (1927–2020)

The Honourable Jim Brown

Member of the Legislative Assembly of Western Australia
- In office 20 February 1971 – 30 March 1974
- Preceded by: Jack Stewart
- Succeeded by: Hendy Cowan
- Constituency: Merredin-Yilgarn

Member of the Legislative Council of Western Australia
- In office 22 May 1980 – 21 May 1989
- Preceded by: Claude Stubbs
- Succeeded by: None (seat abolished)
- Constituency: South-East Province
- In office 22 May 1989 – 3 March 1992 Serving with Caldwell, Charlton, McAleer, Wordsworth
- Constituency: Agricultural Region

Personal details
- Born: 5 April 1927 Merredin, Western Australia
- Died: 28 May 2020 (aged 93) South Perth, Western Australia
- Party: Labor

James McMillan Brown (5 April 1927 – 28 May 2020) was an Australian politician who served in both houses of the Parliament of Western Australia, representing the Labor Party. He was a member of the Legislative Assembly from 1971 to 1974, and later served in the Legislative Council from 1980 to 1992.

== Early life ==
Brown was born in Merredin, in the Wheatbelt, to Susan Marion (née Godridge) and William McMillan Brown. His family moved to Perth when he was a child, where he attended John Curtin Senior High School. In April 1945, after turning 18, he enlisted in the Royal Australian Air Force (RAAF), although the imminent end of the war meant his time in the military was short-lived. Brown played high-level Australian rules football as a youth, appearing in three senior games for South Fremantle during the 1949 WANFL season. He moved to the country in 1950, initially running a store in Muntadgin with his brother, and later running a service station and Massey Ferguson dealership in Merredin.

== Politics ==
Brown first ran for parliament at the 1968 state election. He was preselected to replace Lionel Kelly (a former Labor minister) in the seat of Merredin-Yilgarn, but lost to the Liberal Party's Jack Stewart. Brown successfully recontested the seat at the 1971 election, winning 52.7 percent of the two-party-preferred vote. However, he held it only until the next election in 1974, when he was defeated by the National Alliance's Hendy Cowan. Brown re-entered parliament at the 1980 state election, winning election to the Legislative Council's South-East Province. He was re-elected in 1986, and at the 1989 election (following electoral reform) transferred to the new five-member Agricultural Region. Brown was elected chairman of committees in the Legislative Council in August 1989, and held the position until his retirement from parliament in March 1992.

== See also ==
- Members of the Western Australian Legislative Assembly
- Members of the Western Australian Legislative Council
