= Grace Vaughan =

Australian politician

The Honourable Grace Vaughan

Member of the Legislative Council of Western Australia
- In office 22 May 1974 – 21 May 1980
- Preceded by: Jerry Dolan
- Succeeded by: Phillip Pendal
- Constituency: South-East Metropolitan Province

Personal details
- Born: 1 April 1922 Neutral Bay, New South Wales, Australia
- Died: 21 January 1984 (aged 61) Nedlands, Western Australia, Australia
- Party: Labor

Grace Sydney Vaughan (née Ingram; 1 April 1922 – 21 January 1984) was an Australian politician who was a Labor Party member of the Legislative Council of Western Australia from 1974 to 1980. Prior to entering politics, she was a social worker, holding degrees from the University of New South Wales and the University of Western Australia. Vaughan entered parliament at the 1974 state election, and served a single six-year term before being defeated at the 1980 election. Before she and Margaret McAleer were elected in 1974, only two other women had ever served in the Legislative Council (Ruby Hutchison and Lyla Elliott). After leaving parliament, Vaughan served as president of the International Federation of Social Workers from 1983 to her death in 1984.

== See also ==
- Women in the Western Australian Legislative Council
