= Hendy Cowan =

Australian politician

The Honourable Hendy Cowan AO

13th Deputy Premier of Western Australia
- In office 16 February 1993 – 16 February 2001
- Premier: Richard Court
- Preceded by: Ian Taylor
- Succeeded by: Eric Ripper

3rd Chancellor of Edith Cowan University
- In office 31 December 2004 – 1 January 2019
- Nominated by: Geoff Gallop
- Appointed by: Ken Michael
- Preceded by: Robert Nicholson
- Succeeded by: Kerry Sanderson

11th Leader of the National Party of Western Australia
- In office 25 March 1985 – 16 October 2001
- Deputy: Monty House
- Preceded by: Dick Old
- Succeeded by: Max Trenorden

Member of the Western Australian Parliament for Merredin
- In office 30 March 1974 – 16 October 2001
- Preceded by: James McMillan Brown
- Succeeded by: Brendon Grylls

Personal details
- Born: 25 April 1943 (age 83) Merredin, Western Australia
- Party: National Party
- Education: Hale School
- Profession: Farmer

Hendy John Cowan AO (born 25 April 1943) is a former deputy premier of Western Australia.

He had served in the Western Australian Legislative Assembly as the member for Merredin from 30 March 1974 (known as Merredin-Yilgarn until 19 February 1977). He won the seat in 1974, defeating a one-term Labor incumbent. A 1977 redistribution made the seat very secure for him, and he would never be seriously threatened at an election again.

He represented his electorate for a total of 27 years, including 23 years as leader of the National Party in Western Australia between 1979 and 2001.

Cowan retired from the parliament on 16 October 2001, having been the Western Australian assembly's Father of the House since 14 December 1996.

== Biography ==
Cowan was born in Merredin on 25 April 1943, the son of James Cowan, a farmer from Narembeen and Ruth Anderson. He is a grandnephew of Edith Cowan, the first woman elected as a representative in an Australian parliament.

He was educated at Mount Walker Primary school and later at Hale School. He returned to the family farm in 1959 and married Anita Treloar on 2 January 1965.

Cowan was an active sports participant in the district, playing and coaching local football, tennis, golf and basketball clubs. He played more than 350 games for the Narembeen Football Club and in his last seven years with the club played in six grand finals, helping to win four flags. He was awarded a life membership of the club.

== Parliamentary career ==
Representing the National Country Party (NCP), he defeated Labor's James McMillan Brown in the March 1974 election for the seat of Merredin-Yilgarn.

Cowan was the state parliamentary secretary for the NCP from 1975 until 1978 when the party divided in July of that year. The schism was triggered over a political donation of $200,000 from mining entrepreneur Lang Hancock through the party president from which offers of campaign assistance were made to parliamentary officeholders to vote to oust Dick Old, the parliamentary leader. The NCP had completely fractured by August when Cowan, the vice president of the party and Jim Fletcher, the general president, walked out of a strategy planning meeting. The allegation of the campaign offer had been made against Mr. Fletcher. Liberal Premier Sir Charles Court dominated conservative politics during the period and the rural party was seen as having only minor influence.

A new party, The National Party, was established which Cowan and a series of disaffected NCP members joined. By November 1978 it had three parliamentary members in Cowan, Matt Stephens and Ray McPharlin with Fletcher as president. The name was initially disallowed after objections from the National Party in Queensland, Victoria and Tasmania but later formalised as the National Party of Australia (WA). The two rural parties worked independently of one another whilst quietly (and occasionally, publicly) feuding including an impasse when NCP members refused to associate with NPA members in 1985. The situation was finally resolved in late 1985 under Cowan's leadership and the reunited party progressed to form alliances with the Liberal Party.

In April 1981 the parliament voted on a bill to abolish the death penalty—Western Australia was the last remaining Australian state with the death penalty still in its statutes and opposition members were granted a conscience vote on the bill. Cowan was the only non-Labor MP in the Legislative Assembly to support the bill, in opposition to the National Party national conference which had supported retention of the penalty.

The conservative parties were in opposition through most of the 1980s with Labor yet to suffer from major fallout from the WA Inc fiasco and the 1987 stock market crash. In 1989 Liberal opposition leader Barry MacKinnon was pushing for the Nationals to help block supply in the Upper House to topple the Dowding government. Cowan refused to cooperate knowing that a small swing to the Liberals in the coming election could potentially garner the Liberals as many as nine additional seats and an absolute majority in the Assembly, thus weakening the Nationals' position. In February the following year, Cowan and the Nationals had reversed their stance and decided to block supply in a bid to present themselves as a decisive and consistent conservative force.

In the 1993 state election, the conservative forces finally regained government, largely by just being able to finally present themselves as united. This was despite what should have been a relatively easy ride given Labor's problems with WA Inc. and the findings of the associated Royal commission which had been handed down the year before. The Coalition won a small, but absolute majority in both houses with the Nationals holding 6 seats in the lower house and 3 in the upper house. Nevertheless, a Liberal-National Party coalition was formed with Court as Premier. Cowan served as Deputy Premier from 1993 to 2001, as well as holding ministerial portfolios of Commerce and Trade (16 February 1993 to 16 February 2001), Small Business and Regional Development (10 February 1995 to 16 February 2001). Richard Court was Premier during the period.

In October 2001 he resigned from the Western Australian Parliament to contest the Senate election for the Nationals. Cowan managed 2.3% of the primary vote, an increase from the previous federal election but unsatisfactory given Cowan's profile and the party's belief that he was the best hope since its last representative, Sir Tom Drake-Brockman, retired from politics in 1978. The Senate seat was also contested by sitting Liberal Senator Ross Lightfoot and One Nation's Graeme Campbell. Lightfoot retained the seat.

== Post-parliament ==
After his retirement, Cowan re-established himself at his farm in Narembeen as well as taking appointments on a number of boards including:

- Chancellor of Edith Cowan University
- Chairman of Wescorp QA
- Chairman of the State Agriculture Biotechnology Centre at Murdoch University
- Chairman of the Advisory Group of UWA's Centre for Enterprise Management and Innovation
- Chair of the Institute of Natural Resources Management at Notre Dame University
- President of the Cancer Council Western Australia
- Member of the board of the Wheatbelt Area Consultative Committee
- Director of the Exports Grain Council
- Director of IBC Australia New Zealand

In 2003 he was awarded an Honorary Doctorate in Science from Murdoch University. He was also awarded an Honorary Doctorate in Commerce from Edith Cowan University.

In 2007 he was appointed to conduct an independent review of the West Coast Eagles Football Club, with Steve Scudamore from KPMG.

Western Australian Legislative Assembly
Preceded by James Brown	Member for Merredin-Yilgarn; 1974–1977	District renamed
District renamed	Member for Merredin; 1977–2001	Succeeded by Brendon Grylls
Party political offices
Preceded by Dick Old	Leader of the National Party; 1985–2001	Succeeded by Max Trenorden
