= Don Cooley =

Australian politician

Donald Walter Cooley OAM (31 July 1918 – 18 May 2007) was an Australian politician. He was an Australian Labor Party member of the Western Australian Legislative Council from 1974 to 1980, representing North-East Metropolitan Province.

Cooley was born in Perth, Western Australia and was educated at Leederville Primary School and Perth Boys' School. He went to work at the Emu Brewery in 1940 before enlisting for service in World War II on 19 July 1942, serving in the 3rd Field Regiment and then the 6th Division fighting against the Japanese in Papua New Guinea. He was discharged from the military on 20 February 1946 and returned to working at the brewery. He was elected secretary of the Breweries & Bottleyards Employees Industrial Union of Workers WA in 1954 and served in that role until 1970. Cooley was also president of the Trades & Labor Council of Western Australia from 1965 to 1976, having been a trustee for the council and its predecessor since 1955; his tenure included a TLC "black ban" on the 1971 South African rugby tour.

Cooley was also a justice of the peace from 1968, a delegate to the International Labour Organization conference in 1969 and 1973, a member of the executive of the Australian Council of Trade Unions in 1971 and a member of the Western Australian Institute of Technology council from 1972 to 1974. A long-term member of the Labor Party, having joined in 1937, he was a delegate to the party's state executive from 1955 to 1976 and its senior vice-president in 1966. Cooley was also a keen sportsman, having played both football and cricket in his youth, and later serving as a first-class cricket umpire.

Cooley was elected to the Legislative Council at the 1974 state election. He was deputy chairman of committees and a member of the Standing Orders Committee from 1977 to 1980. He was responsible for an overnight filibuster of a controversial Emergency Services Bill proposed by the government of Charles Court. He retired at the conclusion of his six-year term in 1980.

After leaving parliament, Cooley retired to the coastal town of Augusta in 1980. In 1985, he published a book, Leading the Way: A History of the Breweries and Bottleyards Employees' Union 1910–1975. He was awarded the Medal of the Order of Australia Medal in the 1985 Australia Day Honours for his services to the union movement. He died at Augusta in 2007; he was cremated at Bunbury and his ashes scattered in Augusta.

Cooley married Elsie May Hodges on 18 January 1941; they had two sons and one daughter.
