= Electoral district of Merredin =

Former electoral district of Western Australia

Merredin Western Australia—Legislative Assembly
- State: Western Australia
- Dates current: 1950–2008^{1}
- Namesake: Merredin

Footnotes
- ^{1} known as Merredin-Yilgarn 1950–1977

Merredin was an electoral district of the Legislative Assembly in the Australian state of Western Australia from 1950 to 2008.

Originally known as Merredin-Yilgarn, the name was shortened in 1977. The district was located in the Wheatbelt region of Western Australia and was named for the town of Merredin.

Merredin was abolished in 2008 as a result of the reduction in rural seats made necessary by the one vote one value reforms. Its former territory was largely incorporated into the new seat of Central Wheatbelt, with parts also added to the districts of Moore and Wagin.

At various times, Merredin was held by all three of the major parties. The district was held by the Labor Party for all but one term during its first 24 years. From 1974 onward, however, it was held by National Party, and after a 1977 redistribution, it was a comfortably safe National seat.

== Geography ==
At its abolition, Merredin covered several inland rural shires. Its towns included Merredin, Dalwallinu, Wongan Hills, Cunderdin, Kellerberrin, Quairading, Bruce Rock and Corrigin.

== Members for Merredin ==
Merredin-Yilgarn (1950–1977)
Member	Party	Term
Lionel Kelly	Labor	1950–1968
Jack Stewart	Liberal	1968–1971
Jim Brown	Labor	1971–1974
Hendy Cowan	Country	1974–1977
Merredin (1977–2008)
Member	Party	Term
Hendy Cowan	National	1977–2001
Brendon Grylls	National	2001–2008
