= Roy Claughton =

Australian politician

The Honourable Roy Claughton

Member of the Legislative Council of Western Australia
- In office 22 May 1968 – 21 May 1980
- Preceded by: Herbert Robinson
- Succeeded by: Peter Wells
- Constituency: North Metropolitan Province

Personal details
- Born: 14 August 1927 Bassendean, Western Australia
- Died: 26 April 2012 (aged 84) Kalamunda, Western Australia
- Party: Labor

Roy Frederick Claughton (14 August 1927 – 26 April 2012) was an Australian politician who served as a Labor Party member of the Legislative Council of Western Australia from 1968 to 1980, representing North Metropolitan Province.

Claughton was born in Perth to Mabel Alice (née Parker) and James Edward Frederick Claughton. He attended the Perth Boys School before going on to study teaching at the University of Western Australia and Claremont Teachers College. Before entering politics, he worked as a primary school teacher, both in Perth and at country schools. Claughton entered parliament at the 1968 state election, narrowly defeating Herbert Robinson (the sitting Liberal Party member) in North Metropolitan Province. He served as deputy chairman of committees in the Legislative Council from 1971 to 1974, and then as a Labor Party whip from 1974 to 1980. Claughton was re-elected to a second six-year term at the 1974 state election, but at the 1980 election was defeated by Peter Wells of the Liberal Party. After leaving parliament, he served on the board of the State Lotteries Commission from 1983 to 1986. Claughton died in April 2012, aged 84. He had married Judith Mae Devereux in 1955, with whom he had four children.
