= Harry Gayfer =

Australian politician (1925–2021)

The Honourable Harry Gayfer AM

Member of the Western Australian Legislative Assembly
- In office 13 March 1962 – 30 March 1974
- Preceded by: None (new seat)
- Succeeded by: Ken McIver
- Constituency: Avon

Member of the Western Australian Legislative Council
- In office 22 May 1974 – 21 May 1989
- Preceded by: Leslie Diver
- Succeeded by: None (seat abolished)
- Constituency: Central Province

Personal details
- Born: 12 August 1925 Kensington, London, England
- Died: 15 July 2021 (aged 95) Corrigin, Western Australia
- Party: National (Note: Gayfer's party was known as the Country Party until 1975, as the National Country Party from 1975 to 1985, and as the National Party thereafter)

Harry Walter Gayfer (12 August 1925 – 15 July 2021) was an Australian politician who served in both houses of the Parliament of Western Australia. He was a member of the Legislative Assembly from 1962 to 1974, and then a member of the Legislative Council from 1974 to 1989.

Gayfer was born in London, England, but moved to Western Australia as an infant. He attended Scotch College, Perth, and was the school's head prefect in 1942. After leaving school, Gayfer began farming at Corrigin, in Western Australia's Wheatbelt region. He was elected to the Corrigin Shire Council in 1955, and in 1959 was made a director of Co-operative Bulk Handling, eventually becoming chairman.

Standing for the Country Party, Gayfer entered parliament at the 1962 state election, winning the seat of Avon. He was appointed Country Party whip in 1969, but at the 1974 state election left the Legislative Assembly to transfer to the Legislative Council, winning election to Central Province. Gayfer was re-elected twice (in 1980 and 1986), and eventually left parliament at the 1989 election.

He was awarded the Medal of the Order of Australia (OAM) in 1991, and then upgraded to a Member of the Order of Australia (AM) in 1997, with both awards being "in recognition of service to primary industry".
