= Ian Pratt (politician) =

Australian politician

- Constituency: Lower West Province

Personal details
- Born: 21 June 1937 (age 88) Northam, Western Australia, Australia
- Party: Liberal Party
- Spouse: Shirley Harvey
- Profession: School teacher

Ian George Pratt (born 21 June 1937) was an Australian politician, and a member of the Western Australian Legislative Council from 1974 until 1986 representing the seat of Lower West Province for the Liberal Party.

== Biography ==
Pratt was born in Northam, Western Australia, to Herbert Pratt, a farmer, and Maude (née Benbow). He was educated in East Miling and Pithara primary schools, and at Northam Senior High School before gaining his Teacher's Certificate in 1956 at Claremont Teachers College. He then worked as a teacher in primary schools at Cannington (1957–1958), Rivervale (1959–1962) and Armadale (1963–1974). On 10 May 1958 at St Peter's Church in Victoria Park, he married Shirley Harvey, with whom he was to have two sons and two daughters.

From 1969 to 1975 he served on the Shire of Armadale-Kelmscott as a councillor, and was elected deputy president of the Shire in 1974. He was the foundation president of the Canning Districts branch of the Western Australian State School Teachers' Union and was president of the Dale District Council of the WA Parents & Citizens Association. He had also joined the Liberal Party and was president of the Armadale branch, secretary of the Canning Division Council and a member of the State Council.

At the 1974 state election, he stood for and won the second Lower West Province seat under the Liberal banner, and was to hold it for 12 years. He served two stints as Deputy Chairman of Committees and was briefly the Shadow Minister for Health under the Hassell shadow cabinet from 12 March 1984 until July 1984.

Following his exit from politics in 1986, he went into small business and real estate. He was also associated with the Armadale Tennis Club, the South Suburban Tennis Association, the Dale Little Athletics Centre and the ARKS Hockey Club, all of which he served as president.

Parliament of Western Australia
Preceded by Graham MacKinnon	Member for Lower West Province; 1974–1986	Succeeded by Beryl Jones
