= Sandy Lewis =

Australian politician

- Born: Alexander Ashley Lewis; 22 January 1931; Glen Osmond, South Australia, Australia
- Died: 9 May 2016 (aged 85); South Australia
- Education: University of Adelaide
- Occupations: Farmer, agent, machinery dealer
- Spouse(s): Patricia Symons; Patricia Wright
- Children: Bronwyn Mary Lewis
- Parent(s): Lancelot Ashley Lewis and Grace Margaret (Gretta) Lewis nee Laidlaw
- Relatives: Essington Lewis (uncle); Tom Lewis (brother)

Member of Parliament for Blackwood; Lower Central; Western Australia
- In office 1972–1989

Personal details
- Party: Liberal Party

Alexander Ashley Lewis ( 22 January 1931 – 9 May 2016), known as Sandy Lewis, was an Australian politician who represented the Western Australian Legislative Assembly seat of Blackwood from 1972 until 1974, and one of the two Legislative Council seats for Lower Central Province from 1974 until 1989. He was a member of the Liberal Party.

== Family ==
Lewis was born in Glen Osmond, a suburb of Adelaide, South Australia, to Lancelot Lewis, a managing director of Goldsbrough Mort in Adelaide and brother of Essington Lewis, and Grace Laidlaw OBE. His older brother, Tom, briefly served as Premier of New South Wales from 3 January 1975 until 23 January 1976.

He was educated at St Peter's College and at the University of Adelaide, before moving to Western Australia in October 1952. He initially worked as a jackeroo, trade cadet and farm contractor, before taking up farming at Kojonup in 1955. On 21 May 1955, he returned to Adelaide to marry Patricia Symons, with whom he had one daughter Bronwyn Mary in 1959.

In March 1978, he and his wife divorced, and nine months later, he married Patricia Wright in Claremont.

He died on 9 May 2016 in South Australia.

== Career and politics ==
In 1961 he founded and was the principal director of PS Agencies and in 1967 became the first individual winner of the John Lynn Memorial Prize for outstanding contribution to the farm machinery industry.

Lewis became active in Liberal politics, becoming president of the Mobrup branch near Kojonup, and then president for the Division of Forrest. At a by-election on 16 December 1972, he was elected to the Legislative Assembly of Blackwood. When this seat was abolished at the 1974 election, he successfully transferred to a Lower Central Province seat in the Legislative Council.

From 1977 until 1984, with a brief break in 1982–1983, Lewis served as secretary to the Parliamentary Liberal Party, and in 1983–1984, to the Shadow Cabinet following the defeat of the Liberal government. Additionally, he was a member of the Joint House Committee for the entire period, and chaired a Select Committee into national parks in 1980–1981, into cultural and recreational facilities in 1982, and into the Conservation and Land Management Bill 1984 (during which he became an honorary Royal Commissioner).

In March 1986, he resigned from the Liberal Party over a disagreement with leader Bill Hassell over the shadow cabinet's relationship with Select Committees. He designated himself an "independent Liberal" but rejoined the party in October 1986. He was rewarded with a shadow secretary role with special responsibility for party liaison, the campaign committee and special projects in December 1986, and served on select committees inquiring into the SEC advanced coal purchase from Western Collieries Ltd and the state funding of Aboriginal programs in 1988. With the abolition of his seat at the 1989 election, he nominated for Liberal preselection for a winnable seat in the South West region, but failed in his bid, and exited from political life at the election.

He engaged actively in the local community, serving on the Bushfire Brigades Committee as well as football and aero clubs. From 1977, he was also state secretary of the Farm Machinery Dealers' Association, becoming its national secretary in 1979.
