= Thomas Knight (Australian politician) =

Australian politician (1935–2022)

The Honourable Thomas Knight

Member of the Legislative Council of Western Australia
- In office 22 May 1974 – 21 May 1986
- Preceded by: Jack Thomson
- Succeeded by: John Caldwell
- Constituency: South Province

Personal details
- Born: 28 April 1935 Albany, Western Australia, Australia
- Died: 24 October 2022 (aged 87) Albany, Western Australia, Australia
- Party: Liberal

Thomas Knight (28 April 1935 – 24 October 2022) was an Australian politician who was a Liberal Party member of the Legislative Council of Western Australia from 1974 to 1986, representing South Province.

Knight was born in Albany, Western Australia, to Jean Elizabeth (née Nesbitt) and Frederick Knight. He attended Albany High School, and after leaving school began working as a builder, eventually starting his own development company. Knight served on the Albany Town Council from 1964 to 1967, and became president of the local branch of the Liberal Party. He was preselected for the seat of Albany at the 1968 state election, but withdrew his candidacy prior to the election. His replacement, Henry Ayers, lost the seat to Jack Hall (the sitting Labor member) by a large margin.

At the 1974 state election, Knight was elected to the Legislative Council's South Province, winning the seat away from the National Alliance. He served as deputy chairman of committees from 1977 to 1982, as a parliamentary secretary from 1982 to 1983 (in the government of Ray O'Connor), and as a shadow minister from 1983 to 1986 (under the leadership of O'Connor and Bill Hassell). At the 1986 election, Knight was defeated by John Caldwell of the National Party. He attempted to re-enter parliament at the 1989 election, standing for the seat of Stirling in the Legislative Assembly, but was defeated by Monty House, sitting National MP for Katanning-Roe.
