= Upper West Province =

Former electoral province of Western Australia

The Upper West Province was a two-member electoral province of the Western Australian Legislative Council, located in the Mid West region of the state. It was one of several rural seats created following the enactment of the Constitution Acts Amendment Act (No.2) 1963, and became effective on 22 May 1965.

In 1989, the province was abolished by the Acts Amendment (Electoral Reform) Act 1987, and was absorbed into the Mining and Pastoral region under the new proportional voting system.

== Geography ==
The province was made up of three complete Legislative Assembly districts, which changed at each distribution.

Redistribution	Period	Electoral districts	Electors	% of State
1963–64	22 May 1965 – 22 May 1968	Geraldton, Greenough, Moore	16,933	4.10
1966	22 May 1968 – 22 May 1974	Geraldton, Greenough, Moore	17,773	4.30
1972	22 May 1974 – 22 May 1977	Geraldton, Greenough, Moore	21,586	3.92
1976	22 May 1977 – 22 May 1983	Geraldton, Greenough, Moore	23,887	3.77
1982	22 May 1983 – 22 May 1989	Geraldton, Greenough, Moore	25,265	3.55

== Representation ==
=== Members ===
Member 1	Party	Term	Member 2	Party	Term
Jack Heitman	Country	1965–1977	Les Logan	Country	1965–1974
Thomas McNeil	National/NP	1977–1989	Margaret McAleer	Liberal	1974–1989
