= North-East Metropolitan Province =

The North-East Metropolitan Province was a two-member electoral province of the Western Australian Legislative Council, located in metropolitan Perth. It was one of several metropolitan seats created following the enactment of the Constitution Acts Amendment Act (No.2) 1963, and became effective on 22 May 1965. The province was very safe for the Labor Party, which held most or all of the component Assembly seats.

In 1989, the province was abolished by the Acts Amendment (Electoral Reform) Act 1987, and was split among the five-member East Metropolitan and seven-member North Metropolitan regions under the new proportional voting system.

== Geography ==
The province was made up of several complete Legislative Assembly districts, which changed at each distribution.

Redistribution	Period	Electoral districts	Electors	% of State
1963–64	22 May 1965 – 22 May 1968	Bayswater, Belmont, Maylands, Mount Lawley, Swan	53,372	14.40
1966	22 May 1968 – 22 May 1974	Ascot, Belmont, Maylands, Mirrabooka, Swan	56,308	13.62
1972	22 May 1974 – 22 May 1977	Ascot, Maylands, Morley, Swan	61,565	11.18
1976	22 May 1977 – 22 May 1983	Dianella, Maylands, Morley, Mount Lawley, Swan	79,624	12.58
1982	22 May 1983 – 22 May 1989	Ascot, Helena, Maylands, Morley-Swan, Welshpool	80,718	11.36

== Representation ==
=== Members ===
Member 1	Party	Term	Member 2	Party	Term
Ruby Hutchison	Labor	1965–1971	William Willesee	Labor	1965–1974
Lyla Elliott	Labor	1971–1986	Don Cooley	Labor	1974–1980
Lyla Elliott	Labor	1971–1986	Joe Berinson	Labor	1980–1983
Tom Butler	Labor	1986–1989	Fred McKenzie	Labor	1983–1989
