= Lower Central Province =

The Lower Central Province was a two-member electoral province of the Western Australian Legislative Council, located in the South West and Great Southern regions of the state. It was one of several rural seats created following the enactment of the Constitution Acts Amendment Act (No.2) 1963, and became effective on 22 May 1965. Although initially a safe seat for the Country Party, it usually only contained one safe Assembly seat for that party, and by 1983, the Liberal Party were able to maintain both seats comfortably.

In 1989, the province was abolished by the Acts Amendment (Electoral Reform) Act 1987, and was divided between the Agricultural and South West regions under the new proportional voting system.

== Geography ==
The province was made up of several complete Legislative Assembly districts, which changed at each distribution.

Redistribution	Period	Electoral districts	Electors	% of State
1963–64	22 May 1965 – 22 May 1968	Collie, Katanning, Narrogin	15,722	4.24
1966	22 May 1968 – 22 May 1974	Collie, Katanning, Narrogin	17,139	4.14
1972	22 May 1974 – 22 May 1977	Collie, Katanning, Warren	23,075	4.19
1976	22 May 1977 – 22 May 1983	Collie, Katanning, Warren	24,536	3.88
1982	22 May 1983 – 22 May 1989	Collie, Narrogin, Warren	25,297	3.56

== Representation ==
=== Members ===
Member 1	Party	Term	Member 2	Party	Term
Thomas Perry	Country	1965–1977	Sydney Thompson	Country	1965–1974
Sandy Lewis^{[1]}	Liberal	1974–1988	Winifred Piesse	National (NCP)	1977–1983
Sandy Lewis^{[1]}	Liberal	1974–1988	Bill Stretch	Liberal	1983–1989
Sandy Lewis^{[1]}	Ind. Lib.	1988–1989	Bill Stretch	Liberal	1983–1989

^{1} Sandy Lewis resigned from the Liberal Party in March 1986 following the decision by the Shadow Ministry to appoint standing committee chairmen from amongst its own numbers. He rejoined the party in October 1986, but left again after failing to be preselected in mid-1988.
