= 1974 Western Australian state election =

Election in Western Australia

- 30 March 1974

All 51 seats in the Western Australian Legislative Assembly and 15 (of the 30) seats to the Western Australian Legislative Council 26 Assembly seats were needed for a majority
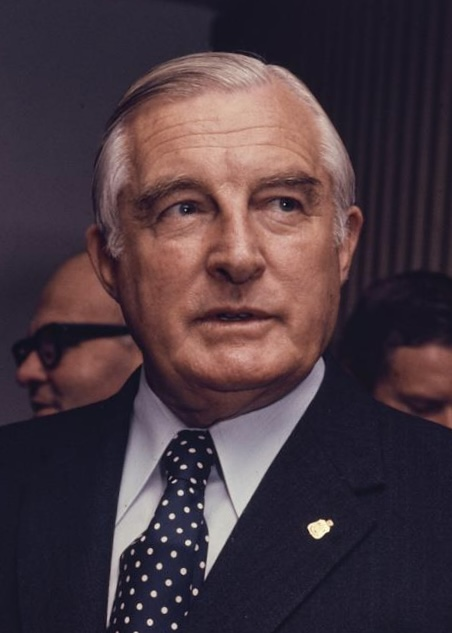

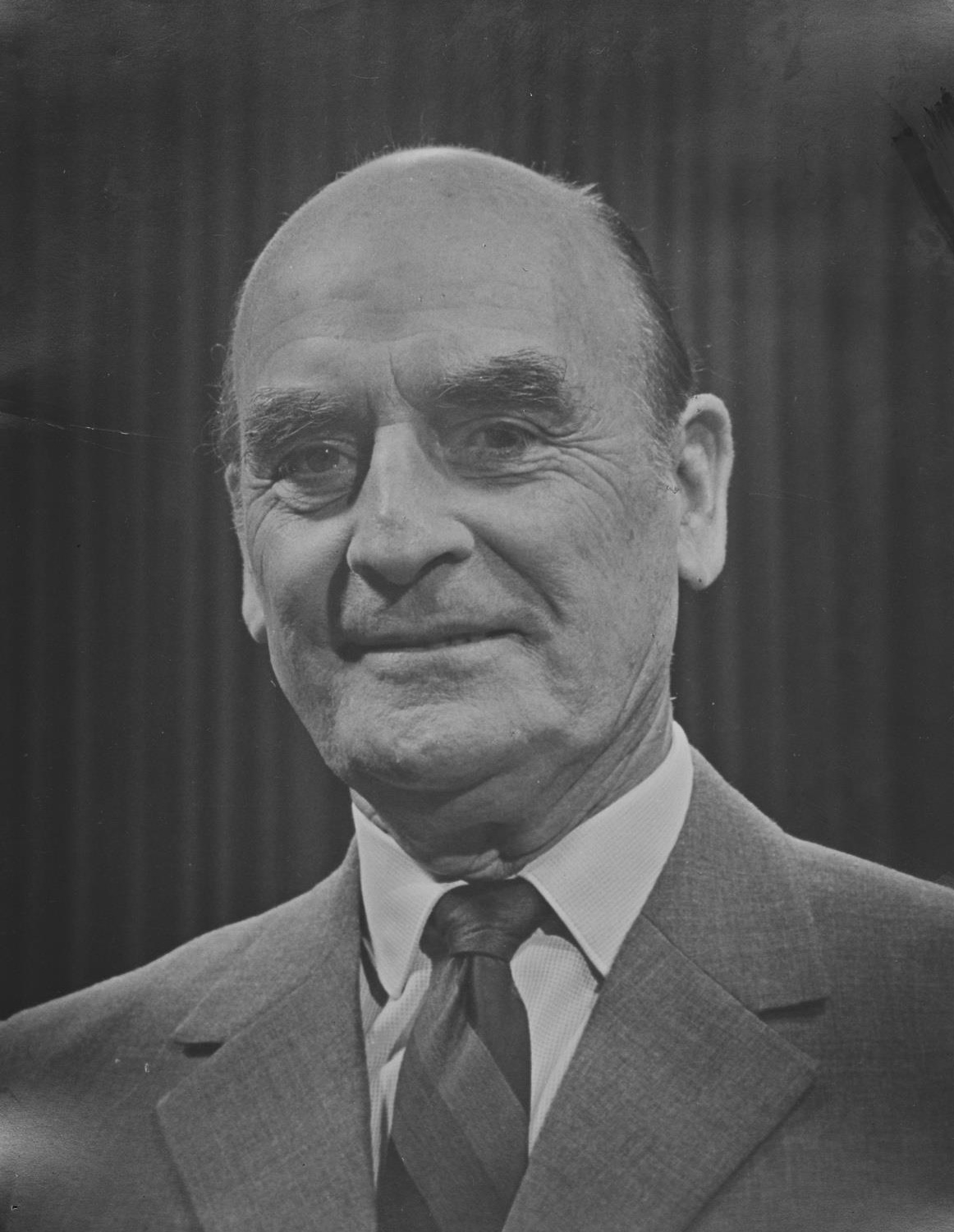
	First party	Second party
Leader	Charles Court	John Tonkin
Party	Liberal/Alliance coalition	Labor
Leader since	5 June 1972	1 January 1967
Leader's seat	Nedlands	Melville
Last election	25 seats	26 seats
Seats won	29 seats	22 seats
Seat change	▲4	▼4
Popular vote	262,621	260,805
Percentage	50.17%	49.83%
Swing	▲2.50	▼2.50
Premier before election
John Tonkin
Labor
Elected Premier
Charles Court
Liberal/National coalition

Elections were held in the state of Western Australia on 30 March 1974 to elect all 51 members to the Legislative Assembly and 15 members to the 30-seat Legislative Council. The one-term Labor government, led by Premier John Tonkin, was defeated by the Liberal Party, led by Opposition Leader Charles Court.

== Overview ==
The Liberal Party won the election after a campaign focused mostly on inflation, industrial unrest, states' rights and education. The outgoing Tonkin government had had a turbulent ride in its three years of office, having only a one-seat majority in the Assembly and being outnumbered two-to-one in the Council.

The 15-month-old Whitlam Labor federal government had proven unpopular in Western Australia which saw it as taking a centralist view towards federal-state affairs, and Whitlam himself was hit by a soft drink can and a tomato whilst addressing voters at Forrest Place during the campaign. The Country Party had tentatively merged with the Democratic Labor Party in the period preceding the election, going to the voters as the National Alliance which put forward a centrist platform—however, they lost both votes and seats as compared to the 1971 election in doing so. Arthur Bickerton, the member for Pilbara, became the first Minister to be defeated at an election since 1939.

To form a parliamentary majority, the National Country Party under its new leader, Ray McPharlin, agreed to form a coalition with the Liberals after the election, and negotiated three seats in the Ministry.

== Results ==
=== Legislative Assembly ===
Western Australian state election, 30 March 1974 Legislative Assembly << 1971–1977 >>
Enrolled voters	597,335^{[1]}				
Votes cast	538,365		Turnout	90.13%	–1.18%
Informal votes	21,966		Informal	4.08%	+0.23%
Summary of votes by party
Party	Primary votes	%	Swing	Seats	Change
Liberal	208,288	40.33%	+10.67%	23	+ 6
Labor	248,395	48.10%	–0.81%	22	– 4
Alliance (CP/DLP)^{[2]}	55,746	10.80%	–5.55%	6	– 2
Australia Party	2,052	0.40%	+0.36%	0	± 0
Independent	1,918	0.37%	–2.91%	0	± 0
Total	516,399			51	
Two-party-preferred
Liberal/NA	262,621	50.17%	+2.50%		
Labor	260,805	49.83%	–2.50%		

Notes:

^{1} 604,222 electors were enrolled to vote at the election, but one seat, Mount Marshall, held by the National Alliance's Ray McPharlin and representing 6,887 electors, was uncontested.
^{2} The Western Australian Country Party agreed to a trial merger with the Democratic Labor Party prior to the election, known as the "National Alliance". They contested 44 seats including many in the metropolitan area. The Alliance ceased to exist shortly after the 1974 election, and the National Country Party adopted a more traditional strategy for subsequent elections.

=== Legislative Council ===
Western Australian state election, 30 March 1974 Legislative Council
Enrolled voters	581,784^{[1]}				
Votes cast	523,182		Turnout	89.93%	–1.28%
Informal votes	25,072		Informal	4.79%	–0.33%
Summary of votes by party
Party	Primary votes	%	Swing	Seats won	Seats held
Labor	235,271	47.23%	+0.45%	5	9
Liberal	226,288	45.43%	+18.07%	9	18
Alliance (CP/DLP)	36,551	7.34%	–13.66%	1	3
Independent			–5.86%	0	0
Total	498,110			15	30
Two-party-preferred
Liberal/NA	267,672	51.90%			
Labor	248,040	48.10%			

^{1} 604,222 electors were enrolled to vote at the election, but one seat, Central Province, held by the National Alliance and representing 22,438 electors, was uncontested.

== Post-election pendulum ==
Liberal/Alliance seats (29)
Marginal
Bunbury	John Sibson	LIB	0.3%
Scarborough	Ray Young	LIB	0.5%
Pilbara	Brian Sodeman	LIB	1.3%
Murray	Richard Shalders	LIB	1.8%
Roe	Geoff Grewar	LIB	1.8% v NA
Toodyay	Mick Nanovich	LIB	2.1%
Albany	Leon Watt	LIB	3.0%
Karrinyup	Jim Clarko	LIB	4.0%
Fairly safe
Wellington	June Craig	LIB	6.1%
Subiaco	Tom Dadour	LIB	6.4%
Dale	Cyril Rushton	LIB	6.5%
Murchison-Eyre	Peter Coyne	LIB	7.0%
Merredin-Yilgarn	Hendy Cowan	NA	7.9%
Cottesloe	Ross Hutchinson	LIB	8.4%
South Perth	Bill Grayden	LIB	8.6%
Kimberley	Alan Ridge	LIB	8.7%
East Melville	Des O'Neil	LIB	8.9%
Mount Lawley	Ray O'Connor	LIB	8.9%
Safe
Kalamunda	Ian Thompson	LIB	12.5%
Floreat	Andrew Mensaros	LIB	14.8%
Gascoyne	Ian Laurance	LIB	15.9%
Nedlands	Charles Court	LIB	16.8%
Moore	Bert Crane	NA	17.7% v LIB
Narrogin	Peter Jones	NA	19.9%
Stirling	Matt Stephens	NA	20.4%
Vasse	Barry Blaikie	LIB	21.4%
Katanning	Dick Old	NA	28.7%
Greenough	David Brand	LIB	28.8%
Mount Marshall	Ray McPharlin	NA	unopp.

Labor seats (22)
Marginal
Rockingham	Mike Barnett	ALP	0.9%
Clontarf	Donald May	ALP	1.9%
Avon	Ken McIver	ALP	4.1%
Warren	David Evans	ALP	4.5%
Geraldton	Jeff Carr	ALP	5.3%
Mount Hawthorn	Ron Bertram	ALP	5.7%
Mundaring	James Moiler	ALP	5.7%
Fairly safe
Canning	Tom Bateman	ALP	6.2%
Morley	Arthur Tonkin	ALP	7.4%
Collie	Tom Jones	ALP	9.6%
Safe
Maylands	John Harman	ALP	12.1%
Perth	Terry Burke	ALP	12.2%
Welshpool	Colin Jamieson	ALP	12.6%
Kalgoorlie	Tom Evans	ALP	13.0%
Boulder-Dundas	Tom Hartrey	ALP	13.2%
Balga	Brian Burke	ALP	13.8%
Swan	Jack Skidmore	ALP	14.1%
Victoria Park	Ron Davies	ALP	14.4%
Fremantle	Harry Fletcher	ALP	16.1%
Ascot	Mal Bryce	ALP	17.2%
Melville	John Tonkin	ALP	19.5%
Cockburn	Don Taylor	ALP	21.1%

== See also ==
- Members of the Western Australian Legislative Assembly, 1971–1974
- Members of the Western Australian Legislative Assembly, 1974–1977
- Candidates of the 1974 Western Australian state election
