= Margaret McAleer =

Australian politician

Margaret McAleer (16 February 1930 – 30 March 1999) was an Australian politician who served as a member of the Western Australian Legislative Council from 1974 to 1993.

The daughter of former Geraldton mayor James McAleer, Margaret was born in Perth, and educated in Geraldton and Perth before studying at the University of Melbourne, from which she graduated with a Bachelor of Arts. In 1961 she began farming at Arrino, and was elected to Three Springs Shire Council in 1967. She became active in the Liberal Party as a member of the Rural Committee from 1968, President of the Kalgoorlie Central Division from 1970 and State Vice President in 1973.

McAleer was elected to the Western Australian Legislative Council in 1974, representing Upper West Province; she was the first non-Labor woman to win a seat in the council. She was the Government Whip from 1980 and Opposition Whip from 1983 until her retirement in 1993, as well as Shadow Minister for Women's Interests from 1990 to 1992. McAleer died in 1999.
