= Results of the 1971 Western Australian state election (Legislative Council) =

Western Australian state election, 20 February 1971 Legislative Council
| Enrolled voters | 537,122 | | | | |
| Votes cast | 489,911 | | Turnout | 91.21% | –1.08% |
| Informal votes | 25,084 | | Informal | 5.12% | +0.63% |
Summary of votes by party
| Party | Primary votes | % | Swing | Seats won | Seats held |
| Labor | 217,465 | 46.78% | +0.12% | 4 | 10 |
| Liberal | 127,191 | 27.36% | –9.64% | 9 | 13 |
| Country | 25,035 | 5.39% | –6.19% | 2 | 7 |
| Democratic Labor | 67,891 | 14.61% | +12.17% | 0 | 0 |
| United Farmers | 5,782 | 1.24% | +1.24% | 0 | 0 |
| Independent | 21,463 | 4.62% | +2.26% | 0 | 0 |
| Total | 464,827 | | | 15 | 30 |

This is a list of electoral region results for the Western Australian Legislative Council in the 1971 Western Australian state election.

== Results by electoral province ==
=== Central ===
1971 Western Australian state election: Central Province
| Party | Candidate | Votes | % | ±% |
|---|---|---|---|---|
| Country | Norm Baxter | 6,089 | 36.8 | −63.2 |
| Labor | Colin Paterson | 5,036 | 30.5 | +30.5 |
| Liberal | Mervyn Cornish | 3,066 | 18.5 | +18.5 |
| United Farmers | Frederick Keast | 1,510 | 9.1 | +9.1 |
| Democratic Labor | Jeoffry Carton | 838 | 5.1 | +5.1 |
| Total formal votes | | 16,539 | 94.4 | |
| Informal votes | | 981 | 5.6 | |
| Turnout | | 17,520 | 87.5 | |
Two-party-preferred result
| Country | Norm Baxter | 10,044 | 60.7 | −39.3 |
| Labor | Colin Paterson | 6,495 | 39.3 | +39.3 |
| Country hold | | Swing | N/A | |

=== Lower Central ===
1971 Western Australian state election: Lower Central Province
| Party | Candidate | Votes | % | ±% |
|---|---|---|---|---|
| Labor | Ross Field | 6,477 | 39.6 | +12.1 |
| Country | Thomas Perry | 5,159 | 31.5 | −41.0 |
| Liberal | Byron Hardie | 1,948 | 11.9 | +11.9 |
| Democratic Labor | George Blake | 967 | 5.9 | +5.9 |
| United Farmers | Leon Day | 884 | 5.4 | +5.4 |
| Independent | Murray Ward | 584 | 3.6 | +3.6 |
| Independent | Samuel Crook | 337 | 2.1 | +2.1 |
| Total formal votes | | 16,356 | 93.5 | −2.9 |
| Informal votes | | 1,134 | 6.5 | +2.9 |
| Turnout | | 17,490 | 94.3 | +0.7 |
Two-party-preferred result
| Country | Thomas Perry | 8,239 | 50.4 | −22.1 |
| Labor | Ross Field | 8,117 | 49.6 | +22.1 |
| Country hold | | Swing | −22.1 | |

=== Lower North ===
1971 Western Australian state election: Lower North Province
| Party | Candidate | Votes | % | ±% |
|---|---|---|---|---|
| Labor | Stan Dellar | 1,929 | 47.4 | +0.9 |
| Liberal | George Brand | 1,839 | 45.2 | −4.0 |
| Democratic Labor | George Jensen | 298 | 7.3 | +3.0 |
| Total formal votes | | 4,066 | 95.7 | −1.0 |
| Informal votes | | 183 | 4.3 | +1.0 |
| Turnout | | 4,249 | 82.9 | +1.5 |
Two-party-preferred result
| Labor | Stan Dellar | 2,035 | 50.1 | +1.1 |
| Liberal | George Brand | 2,031 | 49.9 | −1.1 |
| Labor gain from Liberal | | Swing | +1.1 | |

=== Lower West ===
1971 Western Australian state election: Lower West Province
| Party | Candidate | Votes | % | ±% |
|---|---|---|---|---|
| Labor | John Dawkins | 9,704 | 48.1 | +48.1 |
| Liberal | Neil McNeill | 9,071 | 44.9 | −55.1 |
| Democratic Labor | Robert Burns | 1,418 | 7.0 | +7.0 |
| Total formal votes | | 20,193 | 95.9 | +0.2 |
| Informal votes | | 865 | 4.1 | |
| Turnout | | 21,058 | 93.5 | |
Two-party-preferred result
| Liberal | Neil McNeill | 10,184 | 50.4 | −49.6 |
| Labor | John Dawkins | 10,009 | 49.6 | +49.6 |
| Liberal hold | | Swing | N/A | |

=== Metropolitan ===
1971 Western Australian state election: Metropolitan Province
| Party | Candidate | Votes | % | ±% |
|---|---|---|---|---|
| Liberal | John Williams | 25,258 | 45.3 | −54.7 |
| Labor | Garry Kelly | 19,470 | 35.0 | +35.0 |
| Independent | William Marks | 5,689 | 10.2 | +10.2 |
| Democratic Labor | Peter McGowan | 5,281 | 9.5 | +9.5 |
| Total formal votes | | 55,698 | 95.4 | |
| Informal votes | | 2,706 | 4.6 | |
| Turnout | | 58,404 | 88.6 | |
Two-party-preferred result
| Liberal | John Williams | 32,601 | 58.5 | −41.5 |
| Labor | Garry Kelly | 23,097 | 41.5 | +41.5 |
| Liberal hold | | Swing | N/A | |

=== North ===
1971 Western Australian state election: North Province
| Party | Candidate | Votes | % | ±% |
|---|---|---|---|---|
| Liberal | Bill Withers | 2,783 | 44.7 | −55.3 |
| Labor | Robert Archer | 2,744 | 44.1 | +44.1 |
| Democratic Labor | George Gaunt | 697 | 11.2 | +11.2 |
| Total formal votes | | 6,224 | 94.3 | |
| Informal votes | | 374 | 5.7 | |
| Turnout | | 6,598 | 78.3 | |
Two-party-preferred result
| Liberal | Bill Withers | 3,328 | 53.5 | −46.5 |
| Labor | Robert Archer | 2,896 | 46.5 | +46.5 |
| Liberal hold | | Swing | N/A | |

=== North Metropolitan ===
1971 Western Australian state election: North Metropolitan Province
| Party | Candidate | Votes | % | ±% |
|---|---|---|---|---|
| Labor | Gilbert Currie | 32,126 | 45.9 | −4.5 |
| Liberal | Arthur Griffith | 29,694 | 42.4 | −7.2 |
| Democratic Labor | Adrian Briffa | 8,239 | 11.8 | +11.8 |
| Total formal votes | | 70,059 | 95.7 | +0.2 |
| Informal votes | | 3,138 | 4.3 | −0.2 |
| Turnout | | 73,197 | 91.6 | −0.7 |
Two-party-preferred result
| Liberal | Arthur Griffith | 36,791 | 52.5 | +2.9 |
| Labor | Gilbert Currie | 33,268 | 47.5 | −2.9 |
| Liberal hold | | Swing | +2.9 | |

=== North-East Metropolitan ===
1971 Western Australian state election: North-East Metropolitan Province
| Party | Candidate | Votes | % | ±% |
|---|---|---|---|---|
| Labor | Lyla Elliott | 43,865 | 66.8 | −33.2 |
| Liberal | Walter Staniforth | 21,839 | 33.2 | +33.2 |
| Total formal votes | | 65,704 | 93.6 | |
| Informal votes | | 4,519 | 6.4 | |
| Turnout | | 70,223 | 91.4 | |
| Labor hold | | Swing | N/A | |

=== South ===
1971 Western Australian state election: South Province
| Party | Candidate | Votes | % | ±% |
|---|---|---|---|---|
| Labor | Sydney Hatfield | 6,757 | 33.9 | +33.9 |
| Liberal | David Wordsworth | 6,095 | 30.6 | −69.4 |
| Country | Marshall Hood | 4,554 | 22.9 | +22.9 |
| Democratic Labor | Brian Burns | 1,285 | 6.5 | +6.5 |
| United Farmers | Thomas Oakey | 1,233 | 6.2 | +6.2 |
| Total formal votes | | 19,924 | 95.0 | |
| Informal votes | | 1,050 | 5.0 | |
| Turnout | | 20,974 | 93.3 | |
Two-party-preferred result
| Liberal | David Wordsworth | 11,429 | 57.4 | −42.6 |
| Labor | Sydney Hatfield | 8,495 | 42.6 | +42.6 |
| Liberal hold | | Swing | N/A | |

=== South Metropolitan ===
1971 Western Australian state election: South Metropolitan Province
| Party | Candidate | Votes | % | ±% |
|---|---|---|---|---|
| Labor | Des Dans | 28,878 | 52.8 | −6.2 |
| Independent | Shirley de la Hunty | 13,887 | 25.4 | +25.4 |
| Democratic Labor | Yvonne Van Wees | 11,897 | 21.8 | +21.8 |
| Total formal votes | | 54,662 | 94.9 | −0.6 |
| Informal votes | | 2,946 | 5.1 | +0.6 |
| Turnout | | 57,608 | 92.1 | −0.4 |
| Labor hold | | Swing | N/A | |

- Preferences were not distributed.

=== South East Province ===
1971 Western Australian state election: South-East Province
| Party | Candidate | Votes | % | ±% |
|---|---|---|---|---|
| Labor | Ron Leeson | 11,540 | 66.0 | −34.0 |
| Democratic Labor | Leo McGuire | 5,704 | 34.0 | +34.0 |
| Total formal votes | | 17,244 | 93.8 | |
| Informal votes | | 1,147 | 6.2 | |
| Turnout | | 18,391 | 89.7 | |
| Labor hold | | Swing | N/A | |

=== South-East Metropolitan ===
1971 Western Australian state election: South-East Metropolitan Province
| Party | Candidate | Votes | % | ±% |
|---|---|---|---|---|
| Labor | Donald Bennewith | 24,755 | 45.0 | −2.0 |
| Liberal | Clive Griffiths | 23,749 | 43.2 | −0.2 |
| Democratic Labor | Alan Crofts | 6,457 | 11.8 | +2.2 |
| Total formal votes | | 54,961 | 95.6 | −0.2 |
| Informal votes | | 2,553 | 4.4 | +0.2 |
| Turnout | | 57,514 | 91.2 | −0.4 |
Two-party-preferred result
| Liberal | Clive Griffiths | 29,264 | 53.2 | +5.4 |
| Labor | Donald Bennewith | 25,697 | 46.8 | −5.4 |
| Liberal hold | | Swing | +5.4 | |

=== South West ===
1971 Western Australian state election: South-West Province
| Party | Candidate | Votes | % | ±% |
|---|---|---|---|---|
| Labor | George Smart | 6,531 | 38.2 | +38.2 |
| Liberal | Vic Ferry | 5,954 | 34.8 | −65.2 |
| Country | Keith Nix | 2,481 | 14.5 | +14.5 |
| United Farmers | Rex Newbold | 1,148 | 6.7 | +6.7 |
| Democratic Labor | Leslie Ramsay | 788 | 4.6 | +4.6 |
| Independent | Doris Callow | 187 | 1.1 | +1.1 |
| Total formal votes | | 17,089 | 94.2 | |
| Informal votes | | 1,050 | 5.8 | |
| Turnout | | 18,139 | 93.4 | |
Two-party-preferred result
| Liberal | Vic Ferry | 8,586 | 50.2 | −49.8 |
| Labor | George Smart | 8,503 | 49.8 | +49.8 |
| Liberal hold | | Swing | N/A | |

=== Upper West ===
1971 Western Australian state election: Upper West Province
| Party | Candidate | Votes | % | ±% |
|---|---|---|---|---|
| Liberal | Jack Heitman | 7,268 | 37.0 | +37.0 |
| Labor | Jeff Carr | 6,176 | 31.4 | +31.4 |
| Country | Ronald Elphick | 3,386 | 17.2 | −82.8 |
| Democratic Labor | Daniel Carney | 1,038 | 5.3 | +5.3 |
| United Farmers | John Norris | 1,007 | 5.1 | +5.1 |
| Independent | John Walton | 779 | 4.0 | +4.0 |
| Total formal votes | | 19,654 | 94.0 | |
| Informal votes | | 1,245 | 6.0 | |
| Turnout | | 20,899 | 92.3 | |
Two-party-preferred result
| Liberal | Jack Heitman | 11,791 | 60.0 | +60.0 |
| Labor | Jeff Carr | 7,863 | 40.0 | +40.0 |
| Liberal hold | | Swing | N/A | |

=== West Province ===
1971 Western Australian state election: West Province
| Party | Candidate | Votes | % | ±% |
|---|---|---|---|---|
| Labor | Clifford Hunt | 11,477 | 43.4 | −0.3 |
| Liberal | Charles Abbey | 10,466 | 39.6 | +39.6 |
| Country | George Spriggs | 3,366 | 12.7 | −43.6 |
| Democratic Labor | Johannes Jutte | 1,145 | 4.3 | +4.3 |
| Total formal votes | | 26,454 | 95.5 | +1.8 |
| Informal votes | | 1,193 | 4.5 | −1.8 |
| Turnout | | 27,647 | 91.4 | −3.4 |
Two-party-preferred result
| Liberal | Charles Abbey | 14,055 | 53.1 | +53.1 |
| Labor | Clifford Hunt | 12,399 | 46.9 | +3.2 |
| Liberal hold | | Swing | N/A | |

== See also ==
- Results of the Western Australian state election, 1971 (Legislative Assembly)
- 1971 Western Australian state election
- Candidates of the Western Australian state election, 1971
- Members of the Western Australian Legislative Council, 1971–1974
