= Results of the 1965 Western Australian state election (Legislative Council) =

Western Australian state election, 20 February 1965 Legislative Council << 1962–1968 >>
Enrolled voters	392,586				
Votes cast	361,752		Turnout	92.2	+50.5
Informal votes	346,319		Informal	4.3	+3.9
Summary of votes by party
Party	Primary votes	%	Swing	Seats won	Seats held
Liberal and Country	176,051	50.8	–7.6	8	12
Labor	134,694	38.9	–2.6	4	10
Country	20,030	5.8	*	3	8
Communist	8,369	2.4	+2.4	0	0
Independent Liberal	3,579	1.0	+1.0	0	0
Conservative	1,749	0.5	+0.5	0	0
Independent	1,847	0.5	+0.5	0	0
Total	346,319			15	30

This is a list of electoral region results for the Western Australian Legislative Council in the 1965 Western Australian state election.

== Results by electoral province ==
=== Central ===
1965 Western Australian state election: Central Province
Party	Candidate	Votes	%	±%
Country	Norm Baxter	unopposed		
Country hold		Swing		

=== Lower Central ===
1965 Western Australian state election: Lower Central Province
Party	Candidate	Votes	%	±%
Country	Thomas Perry	10,650	74.9	
Independent Liberal	Bill Stretch	3,579	25.1	
Total formal votes		14,229	95.0	
Informal votes		747	5.0	
Turnout		14,976	92.8	
Country hold		Swing		

=== Lower North ===
1965 Western Australian state election: Lower North Province
Party	Candidate	Votes	%	±%
Liberal and Country	George Brand	3,158	52.3	
Labor	David Dellar	2,879	47.7	
Total formal votes		6,037	95.5	
Informal votes		283	4.5	
Turnout		6,320	86.3	
Liberal and Country gain from Labor		Swing		

=== Lower West ===
1965 Western Australian state election: Lower West Province
Party	Candidate	Votes	%	±%
Liberal and Country	Neil McNeill	9,565	59.4	
Labor	Fred Crockenberg	6,539	40.6	
Total formal votes		16,104	95.9	
Informal votes		691	4.1	
Turnout		16,793	93.8	
Liberal and Country hold		Swing		

=== Metropolitan ===
1965 Western Australian state election: Metropolitan Province
Party	Candidate	Votes	%	±%
Liberal and Country	James Hislop	37,487	81.7	
Communist	Annette Aarons	8,369	18.3	
Total formal votes		45,856	93.5	
Informal votes		3,192	6.5	
Turnout		49,048	90.4	
Liberal and Country hold		Swing		

=== North ===
1965 Western Australian state election: North Province
Party	Candidate	Votes	%	±%
Labor	Frank Wise	2,533	69.3	
Liberal and Country	Francis Cameron	1,120	30.7	
Total formal votes		3,653	94.3	
Informal votes		220	5.7	
Turnout		3,873	79.8	
Labor hold		Swing		

=== North Metropolitan ===
1965 Western Australian state election: North Metropolitan Province
Party	Candidate	Votes	%	±%
Liberal and Country	Arthur Griffith	25,104	54.4	
Labor	Ron Bertram	19,327	41.9	
Conservative	Frederick Simpson	1,749	3.8	
Total formal votes		46,180	96.4	
Informal votes		1,733	3.6	
Turnout		47,913	93.6	
Liberal and Country hold		Swing		

- Preferences were not distributed.

=== North-East Metropolitan ===
1965 Western Australian state election: North-East Metropolitan Province
Party	Candidate	Votes	%	±%
Labor	Ruby Hutchison	29,369	55.7	
Liberal and Country	Douglas Klem	23,364	44.3	
Total formal votes		52,733	95.1	
Informal votes		2,721	4.9	
Turnout		55,454	92.6	
Labor hold		Swing		

=== South ===
1965 Western Australian state election: South Province
Party	Candidate	Votes	%	±%
Country	Edward House	9,380	56.6	
Labor	Robin Faulkner	5,337	32.2	
Independent	Francis Gomm	1,847	11.2	
Total formal votes		16,564	97.4	
Informal votes		440	2.6	
Turnout		17,004	93.8	
Country hold		Swing		

- Preferences were not distributed.

=== South Metropolitan ===
1965 Western Australian state election: South Metropolitan Province
Party	Candidate	Votes	%	±%
Labor	Frederick Lavery	24,775	57.3	
Liberal and Country	George Lithgo	18,477	42.7	
Total formal votes		43,252	96.9	
Informal votes		1,362	3.1	
Turnout		44,614	92.7	
Labor hold		Swing		

=== South East ===
1965 Western Australian state election: South-East Province
Party	Candidate	Votes	%	±%
Labor	Jim Garrigan	7,946	54.5	
Liberal and Country	John Cunningham	6,625	45.5	
Total formal votes		14,571	97.3	
Informal votes		404	2.7	
Turnout		14,975	90.4	
Labor hold		Swing		

=== South-East Metropolitan ===
1965 Western Australian state election: South-East Metropolitan Province
Party	Candidate	Votes	%	±%
Liberal and Country	Clive Griffiths	21,124	51.5	
Labor	Ethel Douglas	19,895	48.5	
Total formal votes		41,019	96.0	
Informal votes		1,690	4.0	
Turnout		42,709	92.1	
Liberal and Country hold		Swing		

=== South West ===
1965 Western Australian state election: South-West Province
Party	Candidate	Votes	%	±%
Liberal and Country	Vic Ferry	8,952	62.5	
Labor	Raymond Halden	5,368	37.5	
Total formal votes		14,320	96.7	
Informal votes		485	3.3	
Turnout		14,805	94.5	
Liberal and Country hold		Swing		

=== Upper West ===
1965 Western Australian state election: Upper West Province
Party	Candidate	Votes	%	±%
Country	Jack Heitman	10,771	71.4	
Labor	Oliver Sutherland	4,307	28.6	
Total formal votes		15,078	96.8	
Informal votes		502	3.2	
Turnout		15,580	91.8	
Country hold		Swing		

=== West ===
1965 Western Australian state election: West Province
Party	Candidate	Votes	%	±%
Liberal and Country	Charles Abbey	10,304	61.6	
Labor	Newell Jamieson	6,419	38.4	
Total formal votes		16,723	94.6	
Informal votes		963	5.4	
Turnout		17,686	92.0	
Liberal and Country hold		Swing		

== See also ==
- Results of the Western Australian state election, 1965 (Legislative Assembly)
- 1965 Western Australian state election
- Candidates of the 1965 Western Australian state election
- Members of the Western Australian Legislative Council, 1965–1968
