= Candidates of the 1971 Western Australian state election =

The 1971 Western Australian state election was held on 20 February 1971.

== Retiring Members ==
=== Labor ===
- Arthur Moir (Boulder-Dundas)

=== Liberal ===
- Stewart Bovell (Vasse)
- Richard Burt (Murchison-Eyre)
- Ken Dunn (Darling Range)
- Hugh Guthrie (Subiaco)
- Guy Henn (Wembley)
- Clayton Mitchell (Stirling)

=== Country ===
- James Craig (Toodyay)
- Ron Kitney (Blackwood)

== Legislative Assembly ==
Sitting members are shown in bold text.

Electorate	Held by	Labor candidate	Liberal candidate	Country candidate	DLP candidate	Other candidates
Albany	Labor	**Wyndham Cook**	George Formby		Peter Cameron	
Ascot	Labor	**Merv Toms**			Albert Ots	
Avon	Country			**Harry Gayfer**	Brian Marwick	Tom Ingham (Ind)
Balcatta	Labor	**Herb Graham**			Elmo Gugiatti	
Belmont	Labor	**Colin Jamieson**			Maxine Chamberlain	Arthur Pearson (Ind)
Blackwood	Country	Col Sumner	Del Francis Willmott	David Reid	John Fleeton	Peter Cracknell (UPGA)
Boulder-Dundas	Labor	Tom Hartrey			John Madden	Kevin Merriman (Ind)
Bunbury	Liberal	Robert Wells	**Maurice Williams**		Michael Buswell	Charles Turner (Ind)
Canning	Labor	**Tom Bateman**	Neil Charles		Bill Wallace	Victor Hawtin (Ind. Labor)
Clontarf	Labor	**Donald May**	Malcolm Atwell		Bill O'Grady	
Cockburn	Labor	**Alexander Taylor**			Henry Miller	Victor Williams (Comm.)
Collie	Labor	**Tom Jones**	Iain Paterson		Stan Johnston	
Cottesloe	Liberal	Howard Olney	**Ross Hutchinson**		Keith Carton	
Dale	Liberal	Owen Hanlon	**Cyril Rushton**		Rose Johnson	Ian Trainer (Ind); Joseph Hunt (Law Reform)
Darling Range	Liberal	Tom Howard	Ian Thompson	Walter Davey	Albert Ots	Robert Ravine (Ind); Percy Seaton (Ind)
East Melville	Liberal	Herman Maer	**Des O'Neil**		Rosemary Lorrimar	
Floreat	Liberal	Leslie Park	**Andrew Mensaros**		Bernard Flanagan	Joan Watters (Ind)
Fremantle	Labor	**Harry Fletcher**	Richard Utting		William Kenneally	
Gascoyne	Labor	**Daniel Norton**	Keith Hasleby		Kevin Courtney	Robert Phillips (Ind)
Geraldton	Labor	**Bill Sewell**	Ron Hamilton		Lawrence Eaton	Joyce Webber (Ind Country)
Greenough	Liberal	Fredric Newman	**Sir David Brand**		John Wade	Leonard Hamersley (UPGA)
Kalgoorlie	Labor	**Tom Evans**	Ian Wedgewood		Geoffrey Sands	
Karrinyup	Labor	**Stan Lapham**	Jim Clarko		John Poole	
Katanning	Country	Ray Francisco		**Crawford Nalder**	John Carr	Hugh Carmichael-Smith (UPGA); Lloyd Nelson (Ind Country); Bill Stretch (Ind)
Kimberley	Liberal	Patrick Weir	**Alan Ridge**		Maurice Bailey	
Maylands	Labor	**John Harman**	Ross Trobe		Francis Pownall	
Melville	Labor	**John Tonkin**	Peter Whyte		John O'Reilly	
Merredin-Yilgarn	Liberal	James Brown	**Jack Stewart**	Albert Fletcher	Ray Evans	Jeff Legge (Ind)
Mirrabooka	Liberal	Arthur Tonkin	**Doug Cash**		Brian Preston	Pat Giles (DOGS)
Moore	Country	Michael Oxenburgh		**Edgar Lewis**	Gavin Drew	Raymond Down (Ind Lib); Dawn Yates (UFGA)
Mount Hawthorn	Labor	**Ron Bertram**	John Bulbeck		Patrick Cranley	
Mount Lawley	Liberal	Michael Helm	**Ray O'Connor**		Keith Anderson	
Mount Marshall	Country	Kathleen Knopp		**Ray McPharlin**	Ron Richards	Kenneth May (UFGA)
Murchison-Eyre	Liberal	Geoffrey Bailey	Peter Coyne		Kevin Sauer	Bevan Hamersley (UFGA)
Murray	Liberal	Spencer Geroff	**Ewart Runciman**	Dudley Tuckey	Peter O'Shea	
Narrogin	Country	Malcolm Tucker	Harry Pennington	**William Manning**	Terry Stevenson	Malcolm McNaughton (UFGA)
Nedlands	Liberal	John Crouch	**Sir Charles Court**		George Mazak	Paul Marsh (Comm.); Ralph von Paleske (Ind)
Northam	Labor	**Ken McIver**	Claude Roediger		John van der Zanden	
Perth	Labor	**Terry Burke**	Bob Pike		John Martyr	Tom Cain (Ind Labor); John Dawson (Ind); Francesco Nesci (Ind)
Pilbara	Labor	**Arthur Bickerton**			Michael Barry	
Roe	Country			**Bill Young**	Stephen Mulally	Leonard Gleeson (Ind); Marianne McCall (Ind)
South Perth	Liberal	William Johnson	**Bill Grayden**		Emil Murray	Arthur Williams (Australia)
Stirling	Country	Ray Wood	Peter Drummond	Matt Stephens	Peter Sullivan	George Brookes (Ind); Duncan Hordacre (Ind Country)
Subiaco	Liberal	Dennis Kemp	Tom Dadour		Francis Dwyer	Patrick Holland (DOGS)
Swan	Labor	**John Brady**			Paul McLaughlin	
Toodyay	Country	James Moiler	John Wagthorne	Joseph Wroth	Arthur White	Joseph O'Callaghan (Ind)
Vasse	Liberal	Alexander Hemsley	Barry Blaikie	Colin Fyfe	John Brennan	Edward Packard (Ind)
Victoria Park	Labor	**Ron Davies**			Benjamin Ballantyne	
Warren	Labor	**David Evans**	Murray Edwards		Alfred Whiteside	
Wellington	Liberal	Les Fitcher	**Iven Manning**	Michael Glendon	Francis Cowcher	Francois Baljeu (Ind)
Wembley	Liberal	John Elsegood	Ray Young		Brian Peachey	

== Legislative Council ==
Sitting members are shown in bold text.

Electorate	Held by	Labor candidate	Liberal candidate	Country candidate	DLP candidate	Other candidates
Metropolitan Area
Metropolitan	Liberal	Garry Kelly	Richard Williams*		Peter McGowan	William Marks (Ind)
North Metropolitan	Liberal	Gilbert Currie	**Arthur Griffith***		Adrian Briffa	
North-East Metropolitan	Labor	Lyla Elliott*	Walter Staniforth			
South Metropolitan	Labor	Des Dans*			Yvonne van Wees	Shirley de la Hunty (Ind)
South-East Metropolitan	Liberal	Donald Bennewith	**Clive Griffiths***		Alan Crofts	
Agricultural, Mining and Pastoral Area
Central	Country	Colin Paterson	Mervyn Cornish	**Norm Baxter***	Jeoffry Carton	Frederick Keast (UF)
Lower Central	Country	Ross Field	Byron Hardie	**Thomas Perry***	George Blake	Samuel Crook (Ind); Leon Day (UF); Murray Ward (Ind)
Lower West	Liberal	John Dawkins	**Neil McNeill***		Robert Burns	
South	Country	Sydney Hatfield	David Wordsworth*	Marshall Hood	Brian Burns	Thomas Oakey (UF)
South-East	Labor	Ron Leeson*			Leo McGuire	
South-West	Liberal	George Smart	**Vic Ferry***	Keith Nix	Leslie Ramsay	Doris Callow (Ind); Rex Newbold (UF)
Upper West	Country	Jeffrey Carr	**Jack Heitman***	Ronald Elphick	Daniel Carney	John Norris (UF); John Walton (Ind)
West	Liberal	Clifford Hunt	**Charles Abbey***	George Spriggs	Johannes Jutte	
North West Area
Lower North	Liberal	George Brand	Stan Dellar*		George Jensen	
North	Labor	Robert Archer	Bill Withers*		George Gaunt	

== See also ==
- Members of the Western Australian Legislative Assembly, 1968–1971
- Members of the Western Australian Legislative Assembly, 1971–1974
- Members of the Western Australian Legislative Council, 1968–1971
- Members of the Western Australian Legislative Council, 1971–1974
- 1971 Western Australian state election
