= Dellar (surname) =

Dellar is a surname. Notable people with the surname include:

- David Dellar (1915–1994), Australian politician
- Fred Dellar (1931–2021), British music journalist
- Kevin Dellar (born 1937), Australian rules footballer
- Stan Dellar (1936–2015), Australian politician, son of David
