= Members of the Western Australian Legislative Council, 1971–1974 =

This is a list of members of the Western Australian Legislative Council from 22 May 1971 to 21 May 1974. The chamber had 30 seats made up of 15 provinces each electing two members, on a system of rotation whereby one-half of the members would retire at each triennial election.

Name	Party	Province	Term expires	Years in office
Charles Abbey	Liberal	West	1977	1958–1977
Norm Baxter	Country	Central	1977	1950–1958; 1960–1983
George Berry	Liberal	Lower North	1974	1968–1980
Roy Claughton	Labor	North Metropolitan	1974	1968–1980
Des Dans	Labor	South Metropolitan	1977	1971–1989
Stan Dellar	Labor	Lower North	1977	1971–1977
Leslie Diver	Country	Central	1974	1952–1974
Jerry Dolan	Labor	South-East Metropolitan	1974	1963–1974
Lyla Elliott	Labor	North-East Metropolitan	1977	1971–1986
Vic Ferry	Liberal	South-West	1977	1965–1987
Ron Leeson	Labor	South-East	1977	1971–1983
Arthur Griffith	Liberal	North Metropolitan	1977	1953–1977
Clive Griffiths	Liberal	South-East Metropolitan	1977	1965–1997
Jack Heitman	Liberal	Upper West	1977	1963–1977
John Hunt^{[1]}	Labor	North	1974	1971–1974
Les Logan	Country	Upper West	1974	1947–1974
Graham MacKinnon	Liberal	Lower West	1974	1956–1986
Neil McNeill	Liberal	Lower West	1977	1965–1983
Ian Medcalf	Liberal	Metropolitan	1974	1968–1986
Thomas Perry	Country	Lower Central	1977	1965–1977
Claude Stubbs	Labor	South-East	1974	1962–1980
Ron Thompson	Labor	South Metropolitan	1974	1959–1980
Sydney Thompson	Country	Lower Central	1974	1960–1974
Jack Thomson	Country	South	1974	1950–1974
Fred White^{[1]}	Country	West	1974	1967–1973
Bill Willesee	Labor	North-East Metropolitan	1974	1954–1974
John Williams	Liberal	Metropolitan	1977	1971–1989
Francis Drake Willmott	Liberal	South-West	1974	1955–1974
Bill Withers	Liberal	North	1977	1971–1982
David Wordsworth	Liberal	South	1977	1971–1993

== Notes ==
^{1} On 20 October 1973, West Province Country Party MLC Fred White died. No by-election was held due to the proximity of the 1974 election.

== Sources ==
- Black, David (1991). Legislative Council of Western Australia : membership register, electoral law and statistics, 1890-1989. Perth: Parliamentary History Project. ISBN 0-7309-3641-4.
- Hughes, Colin A.; Aitkin, Don (1986). Voting for the Australian State Upper Houses, 1890-1984. Canberra: Australian National University. ISBN 0-909779-18-X.
- Black, David; Bolton, Geoffrey (2001b). Biographical Register of Members of the Parliament of Western Australia. Vol. Two: 1930-1990 (Revised ed.). Parliament House: Parliament of Western Australia. ISBN 0731697839.
