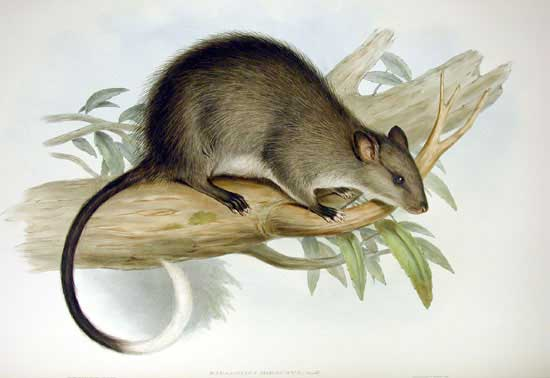

Conservation status
- Vulnerable (IUCN 3.1)

Scientific classification
- Kingdom: Animalia
- Phylum: Chordata
- Class: Mammalia
- Order: Rodentia
- Family: Muridae
- Genus: Mesembriomys
- Species: M. gouldii

Binomial name
- Mesembriomys gouldii (Gray, 1843)

Synonyms
- Hapalotis hirsutus Gould, 1842

= Black-footed tree-rat =

Species of mammal

The black-footed tree-rat (Mesembriomys gouldii), also known as Djintamoonga, is one of two endemic Australian rodent species in the genus Mesembriomys. Both the black-footed tree-rat and its congener, the golden-backed tree-rat (M. macrurus), are found in northern Australia. The species is one of the largest murids found in Australia.

Haematological and blood chemistry research has been performed on the black-footed tree-rat to aid in the captive and natural management of Australian native murids held in captivity for conservation purposes.

== Description ==
The tree-rat has a greyish-brown coat that is shaggy and coarse and has a creamy white underbelly. The hind feet are black with well developed pads and strong sharp claws. They have large ears and a long tail with a brush of white hair at the tip. They grow to a mass of 830 grams (29 oz). The head and body length of the tree-rat is typically 250 to 308 millimetres (9.8 to 12.1 in) with a tail length of 100 to 130 millimetres (3.9 to 5.1 in).

Three subspecies of the black-footed tree-rat have been recognised, based on minor morphological differences in skull and foot shape, as well as variation in colouration. Research into the population genomics of the species agrees with the subspecific delimitation, with the Gulf of Carpentaria separating the Queensland subspecies from the other mainland subspecies found in the Northern Territory and Western Australia. The third subspecies is found on Melville Island in the Northern Territory.

== Behaviour ==
The black-footed tree-rat is typically solitary and nocturnal, although multiple individuals can sometimes be found denning in the same hollow or fallen log. Individuals are semi-arboreal, but spend time on the ground foraging or moving between trees. The species typically shelters in tree hollows (typically Eucalyptus miniata or E. tetrodonta) and pandanus stands during the day.

Individuals have a mean home range area of about 40 hectares, although this can vary considerably.

== Feeding ==
It is a folivore and frugivore and its diet may be supplemented by invertebrates such as termites and molluscs.

== Distribution ==
Mesembriomys gouldii has a range extending from the savannahs of Cape York Peninsula in Queensland westward to the Kimberley region of Western Australia. Habitats such as tropical woodlands or open forest are suitable for the tree rat, although it persists well in the more complex coastal vine thickets and closed forests. It is not common in many areas and many geographic regions show substantial population declines. One study in the Northern Territory found that the extent of occurrence had declined by over 30% compared to the pre-European distribution, and that breadth of occupied environmental space had declined by over 40%. The same study observed that the species was contracting to areas of higher rainfall, milder temperatures, and higher vegetation complexity than it was present in historically.

Genetic estimation of effective population size trajectories in four black-footed tree-rat populations showed that most populations are undergoing severe declines, although the population around the city of Darwin in the Northern Territory appears to have been more stable.

The estimated global population is 30,000, although the distribution and density is poorly known in Western Australia and Queensland, where records are far more sparse.
