= Wollaston Islands (disambiguation) =

Wollaston Islands may refer to:

- Wollaston Islands, south of Chile near Cape Horn
- Wollaston Islands (Nunavut)
- Wollaston Island (Western Australia), off the Kimberley coast
