= Results of the 1971 Western Australian state election (Legislative Assembly) =

List of electoral district results

Western Australian state election, 20 February 1971 Legislative Assembly << 1968–1974 >>
| Enrolled voters | 537,122 | | | | |
| Votes cast | 490,467 | | Turnout | 91.31% | +0.41% |
| Informal votes | 18,897 | | Informal | 3.85% | +0.75% |
Summary of votes by party
| Party | Primary votes | % | Swing | Seats | Change |
| Labor | 230,653 | 48.91% | +3.56% | 26 | + 3 |
| Liberal | 139,865 | 29.66% | –14.34% | 17 | – 2 |
| Country | 26,604 | 5.64% | +0.39% | 8 | – 1 |
| Democratic Labor | 50,508 | 10.71% | +7.45% | 0 | ± 0 |
| United Farmers | 3,511 | 0.74% | +0.74% | 0 | ± 0 |
| Communist | 2,265 | 0.48% | –0.05% | 0 | ± 0 |
| Other parties | 2,687 | 0.57% | –0.12% | 0 | ± 0 |
| Independent | 15,477 | 3.28% | +2.36% | 0 | ± 0 |
| Total | 471,570 | | | 51 | |

This is a list of electoral district results of the 1971 Western Australian election.

== Results by electoral district ==
=== Albany ===
1971 Western Australian state election: Albany
| Party | Candidate | Votes | % | ±% |
|---|---|---|---|---|
| Labor | Wyndham Cook | 3,305 | 54.0 | −1.4 |
| Liberal | George Formby | 2,368 | 38.7 | −5.9 |
| Democratic Labor | Peter Cameron | 449 | 7.3 | +7.3 |
| Total formal votes | | 6,122 | 97.6 | −1.2 |
| Informal votes | | 151 | 2.4 | +1.2 |
| Turnout | | 6,273 | 95.1 | +1.7 |
Two-party-preferred result
| Labor | Wyndham Cook | 3,372 | 55.1 | −0.3 |
| Liberal | George Formby | 2,750 | 44.9 | +0.3 |
| Labor hold | | Swing | −0.3 | |

=== Ascot ===
1971 Western Australian state election: Ascot
| Party | Candidate | Votes | % | ±% |
|---|---|---|---|---|
| Labor | Merv Toms | 9,210 | 75.8 | +12.6 |
| Democratic Labor | Albert Ots | 2,946 | 24.2 | +24.2 |
| Total formal votes | | 12,156 | 93.2 | −4.4 |
| Informal votes | | 885 | 6.8 | +4.4 |
| Turnout | | 13,041 | 91.4 | −0.2 |
| Labor hold | | Swing | N/A | |

=== Avon ===
1971 Western Australian state election: Avon
| Party | Candidate | Votes | % | ±% |
|---|---|---|---|---|
| Country | Harry Gayfer | 4,145 | 75.3 | −24.7 |
| Independent | Tom Ingham | 786 | 14.3 | +14.3 |
| Democratic Labor | Brian Marwick | 576 | 10.5 | +10.5 |
| Total formal votes | | 5,507 | 96.9 | |
| Informal votes | | 173 | 3.1 | |
| Turnout | | 5,680 | 93.0 | |
Two-candidate-preferred result
| Country | Harry Gayfer | 4,433 | 80.5 | −19.5 |
| Independent | Tom Ingham | 1,074 | 19.5 | +19.5 |
| Country hold | | Swing | N/A | |

=== Balcatta ===
1971 Western Australian state election: Balcatta
| Party | Candidate | Votes | % | ±% |
|---|---|---|---|---|
| Labor | Herb Graham | 11,734 | 66.6 | +3.2 |
| Democratic Labor | Elmo Gugiatti | 5,891 | 33.4 | +33.4 |
| Total formal votes | | 17,625 | 94.6 | −1.5 |
| Informal votes | | 1,013 | 5.4 | +1.5 |
| Turnout | | 18,638 | 92.0 | −1.1 |
| Labor hold | | Swing | N/A | |

=== Belmont ===
1971 Western Australian state election: Belmont
| Party | Candidate | Votes | % | ±% |
|---|---|---|---|---|
| Labor | Colin Jamieson | 7,849 | 61.3 | −3.2 |
| Independent | Arthur Pearson | 2,518 | 19.7 | +19.7 |
| Democratic Labor | Maxine Chamberlain | 2,434 | 19.0 | +19.0 |
| Total formal votes | | 12,801 | 95.1 | −2.5 |
| Informal votes | | 661 | 4.9 | +2.5 |
| Turnout | | 13,462 | 91.3 | −0.9 |
Two-candidate-preferred result
| Labor | Colin Jamieson | 8,458 | 66.1 | +1.6 |
| Independent | Arthur Pearson | 4,343 | 33.9 | +33.9 |
| Labor hold | | Swing | N/A | |

=== Blackwood ===
1971 Western Australian state election: Blackwood
| Party | Candidate | Votes | % | ±% |
|---|---|---|---|---|
| Liberal | Del Willmott | 1,627 | 30.3 | −15.1 |
| Country | David Reid | 1,392 | 25.9 | −28.7 |
| Labor | Col Sumner | 1,382 | 25.7 | +25.7 |
| Independent | Peter Cracknell | 559 | 10.4 | +10.4 |
| Democratic Labor | John Fleeton | 417 | 7.8 | +7.8 |
| Total formal votes | | 5,377 | 95.0 | −1.5 |
| Informal votes | | 282 | 5.0 | +1.5 |
| Turnout | | 5,659 | 93.1 | −0.6 |
Two-candidate-preferred result
| Country | David Reid | 3,314 | 61.6 | +7.0 |
| Liberal | Del Willmott | 2,063 | 38.4 | −7.0 |
| Country hold | | Swing | +7.0 | |

=== Boulder-Dundas ===
1971 Western Australian state election: Boulder-Dundas
| Party | Candidate | Votes | % | ±% |
|---|---|---|---|---|
| Labor | Tom Hartrey | 4,202 | 75.8 | −24.2 |
| Independent | Kevin Merriman | 749 | 13.5 | +13.5 |
| Democratic Labor | John Madden | 595 | 10.7 | +10.7 |
| Total formal votes | | 5,546 | 96.3 | |
| Informal votes | | 214 | 3.7 | |
| Turnout | | 5,760 | 87.7 | |
Two-candidate-preferred result
| Labor | Tom Hartrey | 4,351 | 78.5 | −21.5 |
| Independent | Kevin Merriman | 1,195 | 21.5 | +21.5 |
| Labor hold | | Swing | N/A | |

=== Bunbury ===
1971 Western Australian state election: Bunbury
| Party | Candidate | Votes | % | ±% |
|---|---|---|---|---|
| Labor | Robert Wells | 3,096 | 45.9 | +2.1 |
| Liberal | Maurice Williams | 2,932 | 43.4 | −9.2 |
| Democratic Labor | Michael Buswell | 451 | 6.7 | +3.1 |
| Independent | Charles Turner | 272 | 4.0 | +4.0 |
| Total formal votes | | 6,751 | 96.9 | −1.6 |
| Informal votes | | 217 | 3.1 | +1.6 |
| Turnout | | 6,968 | 93.9 | +0.2 |
Two-party-preferred result
| Liberal | Maurice Williams | 3,458 | 51.2 | −4.5 |
| Labor | Robert Wells | 3,293 | 48.8 | +4.5 |
| Liberal hold | | Swing | −4.5 | |

=== Canning ===
1971 Western Australian state election: Canning
| Party | Candidate | Votes | % | ±% |
|---|---|---|---|---|
| Labor | Tom Bateman | 10,602 | 55.4 | +6.9 |
| Liberal | Neil Charles | 6,800 | 35.6 | −8.9 |
| Democratic Labor | Bill Wallace | 1,228 | 6.4 | +2.5 |
| Independent | Victor Hawtin | 494 | 2.6 | +2.6 |
| Total formal votes | | 19,124 | 96.8 | +0.5 |
| Informal votes | | 621 | 3.2 | −0.5 |
| Turnout | | 19,745 | 92.5 | −0.3 |
Two-party-preferred result
| Labor | Tom Bateman | 11,206 | 58.6 | +8.1 |
| Liberal | Neil Charles | 7,918 | 41.4 | −8.1 |
| Labor hold | | Swing | +8.1 | |

=== Clontarf ===
1971 Western Australian state election: Clontarf
| Party | Candidate | Votes | % | ±% |
|---|---|---|---|---|
| Labor | Donald May | 7,314 | 54.3 | +4.2 |
| Liberal | Malcolm Atwell | 5,035 | 37.4 | −4.5 |
| Democratic Labor | Bill O'Grady | 1,120 | 8.3 | +2.9 |
| Total formal votes | | 13,469 | 96.9 | +0.9 |
| Informal votes | | 432 | 3.1 | −0.9 |
| Turnout | | 13,901 | 91.8 | +0.4 |
Two-party-preferred result
| Labor | Donald May | 7,482 | 55.5 | +3.3 |
| Liberal | Malcolm Atwell | 5,987 | 44.5 | −3.3 |
| Labor hold | | Swing | +3.3 | |

=== Cockburn ===
1971 Western Australian state election: Cockburn
| Party | Candidate | Votes | % | ±% |
|---|---|---|---|---|
| Labor | Don Taylor | 12,580 | 73.3 | +4.7 |
| Democratic Labor | Henry Miller | 2,592 | 15.1 | +15.1 |
| Communist | Victor Williams | 1,990 | 11.6 | +11.6 |
| Total formal votes | | 17,162 | 94.0 | −1.1 |
| Informal votes | | 1,092 | 6.0 | +1.1 |
| Turnout | | 18,254 | 92.4 | −0.3 |
Two-candidate-preferred result
| Labor | Don Taylor | 14,073 | 82.0 | +13.4 |
| Democratic Labor | Henry Miller | 3,089 | 18.0 | +18.0 |
| Labor hold | | Swing | N/A | |

=== Collie ===
1971 Western Australian state election: Collie
| Party | Candidate | Votes | % | ±% |
|---|---|---|---|---|
| Labor | Tom Jones | 4,267 | 79.1 | +25.8 |
| Liberal | Iain Paterson | 859 | 15.9 | −24.2 |
| Democratic Labor | Stanley Johnston | 268 | 5.0 | +5.0 |
| Total formal votes | | 5,394 | 98.2 | −0.5 |
| Informal votes | | 101 | 1.8 | +0.5 |
| Turnout | | 5,495 | 94.7 | −0.4 |
Two-party-preferred result
| Labor | Tom Jones | 4,307 | 79.8 | +23.2 |
| Liberal | Iain Paterson | 1,087 | 20.2 | −23.2 |
| Labor hold | | Swing | +23.2 | |

=== Cottesloe ===
1971 Western Australian state election: Cottesloe
| Party | Candidate | Votes | % | ±% |
|---|---|---|---|---|
| Liberal | Ross Hutchinson | 6,611 | 53.6 | −3.7 |
| Labor | Howard Olney | 4,830 | 39.2 | +1.9 |
| Democratic Labor | Keith Carton | 881 | 7.2 | +7.2 |
| Total formal votes | | 12,322 | 97.3 | −0.9 |
| Informal votes | | 346 | 2.7 | +0.9 |
| Turnout | | 12,668 | 90.3 | −0.5 |
Two-party-preferred result
| Liberal | Ross Hutchinson | 7,360 | 59.7 | −0.3 |
| Labor | Howard Olney | 4,962 | 40.3 | +0.3 |
| Liberal hold | | Swing | −0.3 | |

=== Dale ===
1971 Western Australian state election: Dale
| Party | Candidate | Votes | % | ±% |
|---|---|---|---|---|
| Liberal | Cyril Rushton | 5,300 | 48.4 | −17.0 |
| Labor | Owen Hanlon | 4,155 | 37.5 | +2.9 |
| Law Reform | Joseph Hunt | 604 | 5.5 | +5.5 |
| Independent | Ian Trainer | 511 | 4.7 | +4.7 |
| Democratic Labor | Rose Johnson | 382 | 3.5 | +3.5 |
| Total formal votes | | 10,952 | 96.5 | +0.7 |
| Informal votes | | 401 | 3.5 | −0.7 |
| Turnout | | 11,353 | 91.4 | −4.0 |
Two-party-preferred result
| Liberal | Cyril Rushton | 6,136 | 56.0 | −9.4 |
| Labor | Owen Hanlon | 4,816 | 44.0 | +9.4 |
| Liberal hold | | Swing | −9.4 | |

=== Darling Range ===
1971 Western Australian state election: Darling Range
| Party | Candidate | Votes | % | ±% |
|---|---|---|---|---|
| Liberal | Ian Thompson | 3,500 | 38.2 | −14.5 |
| Labor | Tom Howard | 3,275 | 35.8 | +4.5 |
| Independent | Robert Ravine | 891 | 9.7 | +9.7 |
| Country | Walter Davey | 716 | 7.8 | −8.3 |
| Democratic Labor | Albert Ots | 390 | 4.3 | +4.3 |
| Independent | Percy Seaton | 381 | 4.2 | +4.2 |
| Total formal votes | | 9,153 | 96.2 | +0.6 |
| Informal votes | | 363 | 3.8 | −0.6 |
| Turnout | | 9,516 | 92.5 | −2.8 |
Two-party-preferred result
| Liberal | Ian Thompson | 4,848 | 53.0 | −13.2 |
| Labor | Tom Howard | 4,305 | 47.0 | +13.2 |
| Liberal hold | | Swing | −13.2 | |

=== East Melville ===
1971 Western Australian state election: East Melville
| Party | Candidate | Votes | % | ±% |
|---|---|---|---|---|
| Liberal | Des O'Neil | 8,839 | 59.4 | −15.5 |
| Labor | Herman Baer | 4,784 | 32.2 | +32.2 |
| Democratic Labor | Rosemary Lorrimar | 1,257 | 8.4 | +8.4 |
| Total formal votes | | 14,880 | 97.7 | +3.1 |
| Informal votes | | 357 | 2.3 | −3.1 |
| Turnout | | 15,237 | 92.5 | −0.4 |
Two-party-preferred result
| Liberal | Des O'Neil | 9,907 | 66.6 | −2.4 |
| Labor | Herman Baer | 4,973 | 33.4 | +2.4 |
| Liberal hold | | Swing | −2.4 | |

=== Floreat ===
1971 Western Australian state election: Floreat
| Party | Candidate | Votes | % | ±% |
|---|---|---|---|---|
| Liberal | Andrew Mensaros | 5,786 | 47.7 | +2.0 |
| Labor | Leslie Park | 3,326 | 27.4 | −4.8 |
| Independent | Joan Watters | 2,056 | 17.0 | +17.0 |
| Democratic Labor | Bernard Flanagan | 954 | 7.9 | +0.1 |
| Total formal votes | | 12,122 | 97.8 | −0.4 |
| Informal votes | | 273 | 2.2 | +0.4 |
| Turnout | | 12,395 | 90.6 | −1.5 |
Two-party-preferred result
| Liberal | Andrew Mensaros | 7,574 | 62.5 | −2.1 |
| Labor | Leslie Park | 4,548 | 37.5 | +2.1 |
| Liberal hold | | Swing | −2.1 | |

=== Fremantle ===
1971 Western Australian state election: Fremantle
| Party | Candidate | Votes | % | ±% |
|---|---|---|---|---|
| Labor | Harry Fletcher | 7,183 | 66.4 | −7.1 |
| Liberal | Richard Utting | 2,996 | 27.7 | +27.7 |
| Democratic Labor | William Kenneally | 639 | 5.9 | +5.9 |
| Total formal votes | | 10,818 | 95.1 | +0.4 |
| Informal votes | | 552 | 4.9 | −0.4 |
| Turnout | | 11,370 | 90.3 | −0.4 |
Two-party-preferred result
| Labor | Harry Fletcher | 7,279 | 67.3 | +2.3 |
| Liberal | Richard Utting | 3,539 | 32.7 | −2.3 |
| Labor hold | | Swing | +2.3 | |

=== Gascoyne ===
1971 Western Australian state election: Gascoyne
| Party | Candidate | Votes | % | ±% |
|---|---|---|---|---|
| Labor | Daniel Norton | 1,546 | 58.1 | −4.1 |
| Liberal | Keith Hasleby | 839 | 31.5 | −2.6 |
| Independent | Robert Phillips | 167 | 6.3 | +6.3 |
| Democratic Labor | Kevin Courtney | 110 | 4.1 | +4.1 |
| Total formal votes | | 2,662 | 96.1 | −1.3 |
| Informal votes | | 109 | 3.9 | +1.3 |
| Turnout | | 2,771 | 84.4 | −0.3 |
Two-party-preferred result
| Labor | Daniel Norton | 1,645 | 61.8 | −2.3 |
| Liberal | Keith Hasleby | 1,017 | 38.2 | +2.3 |
| Labor hold | | Swing | −2.3 | |

=== Geraldton ===
1971 Western Australian state election: Geraldton
| Party | Candidate | Votes | % | ±% |
|---|---|---|---|---|
| Labor | Bill Sewell | 3,801 | 56.1 | −0.1 |
| Liberal | Ron Hamilton | 2,263 | 33.4 | −10.4 |
| Democratic Labor | Lawrence Eaton | 443 | 6.5 | +6.5 |
| Independent | Joyce Webber | 269 | 4.0 | +4.0 |
| Total formal votes | | 6,776 | 95.7 | −3.2 |
| Informal votes | | 305 | 4.3 | +3.2 |
| Turnout | | 7,081 | 91.9 | +1.1 |
Two-party-preferred result
| Labor | Bill Sewell | 3,948 | 58.3 | +2.1 |
| Liberal | Ron Hamilton | 2,828 | 41.7 | −2.1 |
| Labor hold | | Swing | +2.1 | |

=== Greenough ===
1971 Western Australian state election: Greenough
| Party | Candidate | Votes | % | ±% |
|---|---|---|---|---|
| Liberal | David Brand | 3,321 | 52.6 | −47.4 |
| Labor | Fredric Newman | 1,687 | 26.7 | +26.7 |
| Independent | Leonard Hamersley | 753 | 11.9 | +11.9 |
| Democratic Labor | John Wade | 556 | 8.8 | +8.8 |
| Total formal votes | | 6,317 | 96.1 | |
| Informal votes | | 258 | 3.9 | |
| Turnout | | 6,575 | 91.2 | |
Two-party-preferred result
| Liberal | David Brand | 4,321 | 68.4 | −31.6 |
| Labor | Fredric Newman | 1,996 | 31.6 | +31.6 |
| Liberal hold | | Swing | N/A | |

=== Kalgoorlie ===
1971 Western Australian state election: Kalgoorlie
| Party | Candidate | Votes | % | ±% |
|---|---|---|---|---|
| Labor | Tom Evans | 3,905 | 69.1 | −30.9 |
| Liberal | Ian Wedgewood | 1,409 | 24.9 | +24.9 |
| Democratic Labor | Geoffrey Sands | 336 | 6.0 | +6.0 |
| Total formal votes | | 5,650 | 97.5 | |
| Informal votes | | 143 | 2.5 | |
| Turnout | | 5,793 | 89.4 | |
Two-party-preferred result
| Labor | Tom Evans | 3,955 | 70.0 | −30.0 |
| Liberal | Ian Wedgewood | 1,695 | 30.0 | +30.0 |
| Labor hold | | Swing | N/A | |

=== Karrinyup ===
1971 Western Australian state election: Karrinyup
| Party | Candidate | Votes | % | ±% |
|---|---|---|---|---|
| Labor | Stan Lapham | 7,132 | 49.9 | −3.6 |
| Liberal | Jim Clarko | 5,939 | 41.6 | +0.2 |
| Democratic Labor | John Poole | 1,215 | 8.5 | +3.3 |
| Total formal votes | | 14,286 | 97.8 | +0.8 |
| Informal votes | | 320 | 2.2 | −0.8 |
| Turnout | | 14,606 | 92.1 | −0.3 |
Two-party-preferred result
| Labor | Stan Lapham | 7,421 | 52.0 | −2.3 |
| Liberal | Jim Clarko | 6,865 | 48.0 | +2.3 |
| Labor hold | | Swing | −2.3 | |

=== Katanning ===
1971 Western Australian state election: Katanning
| Party | Candidate | Votes | % | ±% |
|---|---|---|---|---|
| Country | Crawford Nalder | 1,951 | 35.4 | −64.6 |
| Labor | Ray Francisco | 1,520 | 27.6 | +27.6 |
| Independent Country | Lloyd Nelson | 1,147 | 20.8 | +20.8 |
| Democratic Labor | John Carr | 377 | 6.8 | +6.8 |
| United Farmers | Hugh Carmichael-Smith | 329 | 6.0 | +6.0 |
| Independent | William Stretch | 189 | 3.4 | +3.4 |
| Total formal votes | | 5,513 | 94.0 | |
| Informal votes | | 353 | 6.0 | |
| Turnout | | 5,866 | 94.2 | |
Two-party-preferred result
| Country | Crawford Nalder | 3,400 | 61.7 | −38.3 |
| Labor | Ray Francisco | 2,113 | 38.3 | +38.3 |
| Country hold | | Swing | N/A | |

=== Kimberley ===
1971 Western Australian state election: Kimberley
| Party | Candidate | Votes | % | ±% |
|---|---|---|---|---|
| Liberal | Alan Ridge | 1,364 | 56.1 | +3.9 |
| Labor | Patrick Weir | 881 | 36.3 | −11.5 |
| Democratic Labor | Maurice Bailey | 184 | 7.6 | +7.6 |
| Total formal votes | | 2,429 | 95.5 | −3.4 |
| Informal votes | | 113 | 4.5 | +3.4 |
| Turnout | | 2,542 | 80.8 | +0.3 |
Two-party-preferred result
| Liberal | Alan Ridge | 1,520 | 62.6 | +10.4 |
| Labor | Patrick Weir | 909 | 37.4 | −10.4 |
| Liberal hold | | Swing | +10.4 | |

=== Maylands ===
1971 Western Australian state election: Maylands
| Party | Candidate | Votes | % | ±% |
|---|---|---|---|---|
| Labor | John Harman | 6,687 | 58.4 | +7.4 |
| Liberal | Ross Trobe | 3,952 | 34.5 | −7.5 |
| Democratic Labor | Francis Pownall | 819 | 7.1 | +2.7 |
| Total formal votes | | 11,458 | 96.6 | −1.0 |
| Informal votes | | 404 | 3.4 | +1.0 |
| Turnout | | 11,862 | 90.4 | −1.1 |
Two-party-preferred result
| Labor | John Harman | 6,810 | 59.4 | +6.4 |
| Liberal | Ross Trobe | 4,648 | 40.6 | −6.4 |
| Labor hold | | Swing | +6.4 | |

=== Melville ===
1971 Western Australian state election: Melville
| Party | Candidate | Votes | % | ±% |
|---|---|---|---|---|
| Labor | John Tonkin | 8,118 | 64.9 | −2.6 |
| Liberal | Peter Whyte | 3,793 | 30.3 | −2.2 |
| Democratic Labor | Douglas O'Reilly | 592 | 4.7 | +4.7 |
| Total formal votes | | 12,503 | 97.6 | +0.3 |
| Informal votes | | 303 | 2.4 | −0.3 |
| Turnout | | 12,806 | 93.3 | −0.6 |
Two-party-preferred result
| Labor | John Tonkin | 8,207 | 65.6 | −1.9 |
| Liberal | Peter Whyte | 4,296 | 34.4 | +1.9 |
| Labor hold | | Swing | −1.9 | |

=== Merredin-Yilgarn ===
1971 Western Australian state election: Merredin-Yilgarn
| Party | Candidate | Votes | % | ±% |
|---|---|---|---|---|
| Labor | James Brown | 3,021 | 45.4 | +5.5 |
| Liberal | Jack Stewart | 1,447 | 21.7 | −4.1 |
| Country | Albert Fletcher | 1,054 | 15.8 | −7.9 |
| Democratic Labor | Ray Evans | 733 | 11.0 | +11.0 |
| Independent | Jeff Legge | 406 | 6.1 | +6.1 |
| Total formal votes | | 6,661 | 97.0 | −1.9 |
| Informal votes | | 208 | 3.0 | +1.9 |
| Turnout | | 6,869 | 92.3 | −1.6 |
Two-party-preferred result
| Labor | James Brown | 3,510 | 52.7 | +5.6 |
| Liberal | Jack Stewart | 3,151 | 47.3 | −5.6 |
| Labor gain from Liberal | | Swing | +5.6 | |

=== Mirrabooka ===
1971 Western Australian state election: Mirrabooka
| Party | Candidate | Votes | % | ±% |
|---|---|---|---|---|
| Labor | Arthur Tonkin | 8,528 | 48.1 | +2.4 |
| Liberal | Doug Cash | 7,293 | 41.1 | −6.6 |
| Democratic Labor | Brian Preston | 1,522 | 8.6 | +1.9 |
| Independent | Patricia Giles | 378 | 2.1 | +2.1 |
| Total formal votes | | 17,721 | 97.3 | −0.6 |
| Informal votes | | 491 | 2.7 | +0.6 |
| Turnout | | 18,212 | 93.5 | −0.3 |
Two-party-preferred result
| Labor | Arthur Tonkin | 9,160 | 51.7 | +4.5 |
| Liberal | Doug Cash | 8,561 | 48.3 | −4.5 |
| Labor gain from Liberal | | Swing | +4.5 | |

=== Moore ===
1971 Western Australian state election: Moore
| Party | Candidate | Votes | % | ±% |
|---|---|---|---|---|
| Country | Edgar Lewis | 3,167 | 45.6 | −6.7 |
| Labor | Michael Oxenburgh | 1,795 | 25.9 | +25.9 |
| Democratic Labor | Gavin Drew | 824 | 11.9 | +11.9 |
| Independent Liberal | Raymond Down | 647 | 9.3 | +9.3 |
| United Farmers | Lesbia Yates | 506 | 7.3 | +7.3 |
| Total formal votes | | 6,939 | 95.8 | −1.6 |
| Informal votes | | 304 | 4.2 | +1.6 |
| Turnout | | 7,243 | 93.7 | +0.4 |
Two-party-preferred result
| Country | Edgar Lewis | 4,665 | 67.2 | +14.9 |
| Labor | Michael Oxenburgh | 2,274 | 32.8 | +32.8 |
| Country hold | | Swing | N/A | |

=== Mount Hawthorn ===
1971 Western Australian state election: Mount Hawthorn
| Party | Candidate | Votes | % | ±% |
|---|---|---|---|---|
| Labor | Ron Bertram | 6,682 | 55.5 | +2.6 |
| Liberal | John Bulbeck | 3,814 | 31.7 | −7.1 |
| Democratic Labor | Patrick Cranley | 1,546 | 12.8 | +4.6 |
| Total formal votes | | 12,042 | 95.7 | +0.3 |
| Informal votes | | 540 | 4.3 | −0.3 |
| Turnout | | 12,582 | 91.2 | −0.8 |
Two-party-preferred result
| Labor | Ron Bertram | 6,914 | 57.4 | +3.2 |
| Liberal | John Bulbeck | 5,128 | 42.6 | −3.2 |
| Labor hold | | Swing | +3.2 | |

=== Mount Lawley ===
1971 Western Australian state election: Mount Lawley
| Party | Candidate | Votes | % | ±% |
|---|---|---|---|---|
| Liberal | Ray O'Connor | 6,056 | 50.6 | −9.4 |
| Labor | Michael Helm | 4,881 | 40.8 | +0.8 |
| Democratic Labor | Keith Anderson | 1,027 | 8.6 | +8.6 |
| Total formal votes | | 11,964 | 95.6 | −0.7 |
| Informal votes | | 553 | 4.4 | +0.7 |
| Turnout | | 12,517 | 89.4 | −2.0 |
Two-party-preferred result
| Liberal | Ray O'Connor | 6,794 | 56.8 | −3.2 |
| Labor | Michael Helm | 5,170 | 43.2 | +3.2 |
| Liberal hold | | Swing | −3.2 | |

=== Mount Marshall ===
1971 Western Australian state election: Mount Marshall
| Party | Candidate | Votes | % | ±% |
|---|---|---|---|---|
| Country | Ray McPharlin | 3,229 | 56.8 | −43.2 |
| Labor | Kathleen Knopp | 1,237 | 21.8 | +21.8 |
| United Farmers | Kenneth May | 715 | 12.6 | +12.6 |
| Democratic Labor | Ronald Richards | 505 | 8.9 | +8.9 |
| Total formal votes | | 5,686 | 96.4 | |
| Informal votes | | 211 | 3.6 | |
| Turnout | | 5,897 | 91.9 | |
Two-party-preferred result
| Country | Ray McPharlin | 4,126 | 72.6 | −27.4 |
| Labor | Kathleen Knopp | 1,560 | 27.4 | +27.4 |
| Country hold | | Swing | N/A | |

=== Murchison-Eyre ===
1971 Western Australian state election: Murchison-Eyre
| Party | Candidate | Votes | % | ±% |
|---|---|---|---|---|
| Liberal | Peter Coyne | 658 | 46.0 | −54.0 |
| Labor | Geoffrey Bailey | 600 | 42.0 | +42.0 |
| United Farmers | Bevan Hamersley | 109 | 7.6 | +7.6 |
| Democratic Labor | Kevin Sauer | 62 | 4.3 | +4.3 |
| Total formal votes | | 1,429 | 95.6 | |
| Informal votes | | 65 | 4.4 | |
| Turnout | | 1,494 | 81.2 | |
Two-party-preferred result
| Liberal | Peter Coyne | 747 | 52.3 | −47.7 |
| Labor | Geoffrey Bailey | 682 | 47.7 | +47.7 |
| Liberal hold | | Swing | N/A | |

=== Murray ===
1971 Western Australian state election: Murray
| Party | Candidate | Votes | % | ±% |
|---|---|---|---|---|
| Labor | Spencer Geroff | 3,235 | 42.8 | −3.4 |
| Liberal | Ewart Runciman | 2,864 | 37.9 | −15.9 |
| Country | Dudley Tuckey | 1,130 | 14.9 | +14.9 |
| Democratic Labor | Peter O'Shea | 335 | 4.4 | +4.4 |
| Total formal votes | | 7,564 | 97.3 | −1.2 |
| Informal votes | | 208 | 2.7 | +1.2 |
| Turnout | | 7,772 | 94.0 | −0.6 |
Two-party-preferred result
| Liberal | Ewart Runciman | 4,027 | 53.2 | −0.7 |
| Labor | Spencer Geroff | 3,537 | 46.8 | +0.7 |
| Liberal hold | | Swing | −0.7 | |

=== Narrogin ===
1971 Western Australian state election: Narrogin
| Party | Candidate | Votes | % | ±% |
|---|---|---|---|---|
| Country | William Manning | 1,919 | 33.0 | −67.0 |
| Labor | Malcolm Turner | 1,856 | 31.9 | +31.9 |
| Liberal | Harry Pennington | 1,212 | 20.8 | +20.8 |
| United Farmers | Malcolm McNaughton | 540 | 9.3 | +9.3 |
| Democratic Labor | Terry Stevenson | 286 | 4.9 | +4.9 |
| Total formal votes | | 5,813 | 94.8 | |
| Informal votes | | 316 | 5.2 | |
| Turnout | | 6,129 | 94.0 | |
Two-party-preferred result
| Country | William Manning | 3,357 | 57.7 | −42.3 |
| Labor | Malcolm Turner | 2,456 | 42.3 | +42.3 |
| Country hold | | Swing | N/A | |

=== Nedlands ===
1971 Western Australian state election: Nedlands
| Party | Candidate | Votes | % | ±% |
|---|---|---|---|---|
| Liberal | Charles Court | 7,648 | 66.1 | −10.5 |
| Labor | John Crouch | 2,532 | 21.9 | −1.5 |
| Democratic Labor | George Mazak | 855 | 7.4 | +7.4 |
| Communist | Paul Marsh | 275 | 2.4 | +2.4 |
| Independent | Ralph Von Paleske | 264 | 2.3 | +2.3 |
| Total formal votes | | 11,574 | 97.6 | −0.8 |
| Informal votes | | 280 | 2.4 | +0.8 |
| Turnout | | 11,854 | 89.3 | −0.4 |
Two-party-preferred result
| Liberal | Charles Court | 8,666 | 74.9 | −1.8 |
| Labor | John Crouch | 2,908 | 25.1 | +1.8 |
| Liberal hold | | Swing | −1.8 | |

=== Northam ===
1971 Western Australian state election: Northam
| Party | Candidate | Votes | % | ±% |
|---|---|---|---|---|
| Labor | Ken McIver | 3,516 | 60.9 | +12.1 |
| Independent | Claude Roediger | 2,103 | 36.4 | +36.4 |
| Democratic Labor | John Van der Zanden | 159 | 2.3 | +2.3 |
| Total formal votes | | 5,778 | 97.3 | −1.6 |
| Informal votes | | 161 | 2.7 | +1.6 |
| Turnout | | 5,939 | 93.0 | −0.6 |
Two-candidate-preferred result
| Labor | Ken McIver | 3,540 | 61.3 | +7.7 |
| Independent | Claude Roediger | 2,238 | 38.7 | +38.7 |
| Labor hold | | Swing | N/A | |

=== Perth ===
1971 Western Australian state election: Perth
| Party | Candidate | Votes | % | ±% |
|---|---|---|---|---|
| Labor | Terry Burke | 5,002 | 56.0 | +6.1 |
| Liberal | Bob Pike | 2,851 | 31.9 | −3.4 |
| Democratic Labor | John Martyr | 545 | 6.1 | +2.3 |
| Independent | Francesco Nesci | 387 | 4.3 | +4.3 |
| Independent | John Dawson | 91 | 1.0 | +1.0 |
| Independent | Thomas Cain | 60 | 0.7 | +0.7 |
| Total formal votes | | 8,936 | 91.0 | −4.7 |
| Informal votes | | 888 | 9.0 | +4.7 |
| Turnout | | 9,824 | 84.9 | −1.3 |
Two-party-preferred result
| Labor | Terry Burke | 5,352 | 59.9 | +3.7 |
| Liberal | Bob Pike | 3,584 | 40.1 | −3.7 |
| Labor hold | | Swing | +3.7 | |

=== Pilbara ===
1971 Western Australian state election: Pilbara
| Party | Candidate | Votes | % | ±% |
|---|---|---|---|---|
| Labor | Arthur Bickerton | 2,426 | 63.5 | −36.5 |
| Democratic Labor | Michael Barry | 1,395 | 36.5 | +36.5 |
| Total formal votes | | 3,821 | 94.4 | |
| Informal votes | | 225 | 5.6 | |
| Turnout | | 4,046 | 76.7 | |
| Labor hold | | Swing | N/A | |

=== Roe ===
1971 Western Australian state election: Roe
| Party | Candidate | Votes | % | ±% |
|---|---|---|---|---|
| Country | Bill Young | 3,133 | 41.5 | −4.5 |
| Independent | Leonard Gleeson | 2,417 | 32.0 | +32.0 |
| Independent | Marianne McCall | 1,227 | 16.3 | +16.3 |
| Democratic Labor | Stephen Mulally | 766 | 10.2 | +10.2 |
Two-candidate-preferred result
| Country | Bill Young | 3,871 | 51.3 | −8.4 |
| Independent | Leonard Gleeson | 3,672 | 48.7 | +48.7 |
| Country hold | | Swing | N/A | |

=== South Perth ===
1971 Western Australian state election: South Perth
| Party | Candidate | Votes | % | ±% |
|---|---|---|---|---|
| Liberal | Bill Grayden | 6,247 | 53.8 | −24.8 |
| Labor | William Johnson | 4,378 | 37.7 | +37.7 |
| Democratic Labor | Emil Murray | 818 | 7.0 | −14.4 |
| Australia | Arthur Williams | 175 | 1.5 | +1.5 |
| Total formal votes | | 11,618 | 97.3 | +4.6 |
| Informal votes | | 320 | 2.7 | −4.6 |
| Turnout | | 11,938 | 89.5 | −0.3 |
Two-party-preferred result
| Liberal | Bill Grayden | 7,030 | 60.5 | −18.1 |
| Labor | William Johnson | 4,588 | 39.5 | +39.5 |
| Liberal hold | | Swing | N/A | |

=== Stirling ===
1971 Western Australian state election: Stirling
| Party | Candidate | Votes | % | ±% |
|---|---|---|---|---|
| Labor | Ray Wood | 2,020 | 30.9 | +30.9 |
| Liberal | Peter Drummond | 1,769 | 27.0 | +27.0 |
| Country | Matt Stephens | 1,758 | 26.9 | −73.1 |
| Independent | George Brookes | 522 | 8.0 | +8.0 |
| Democratic Labor | Peter Sullivan | 367 | 5.6 | +5.6 |
| Independent | Duncan Hordacre | 111 | 1.7 | +1.7 |
| Total formal votes | | 6,547 | 96.2 | |
| Informal votes | | 256 | 3.8 | |
| Turnout | | 6,803 | 93.3 | |
Two-party-preferred result
| Country | Matt Stephens | 3,941 | 60.2 | −39.8 |
| Labor | Ray Wood | 2,606 | 39.8 | +39.8 |
| Country hold | | Swing | N/A | |

=== Subiaco ===
1971 Western Australian state election: Subiaco
| Party | Candidate | Votes | % | ±% |
|---|---|---|---|---|
| Liberal | Tom Dadour | 5,338 | 46.8 | −1.1 |
| Labor | Dennis Kemp | 4,595 | 40.3 | −6.1 |
| Democratic Labor | Francis Dwyer | 1,191 | 10.5 | +10.5 |
| Defence of Government Schools | Patrick Holland | 272 | 2.4 | +2.4 |
| Total formal votes | | 11,396 | 97.0 | −0.6 |
| Informal votes | | 355 | 3.0 | +0.6 |
| Turnout | | 11,751 | 87.8 | −2.6 |
Two-party-preferred result
| Liberal | Tom Dadour | 6,254 | 54.9 | +4.5 |
| Labor | Dennis Kemp | 5,142 | 45.1 | −4.5 |
| Liberal hold | | Swing | +4.5 | |

=== Swan ===
1971 Western Australian state election: Swan
| Party | Candidate | Votes | % | ±% |
|---|---|---|---|---|
| Labor | John Brady | 9,923 | 75.5 | +4.5 |
| Democratic Labor | Paul McLaughlin | 3,214 | 24.5 | +24.5 |
| Total formal votes | | 13,137 | 94.5 | −3.3 |
| Informal votes | | 761 | 5.5 | +3.3 |
| Turnout | | 13,898 | 91.4 | −0.9 |
| Labor hold | | Swing | N/A | |

=== Toodyay ===
1971 Western Australian state election: Toodyay
| Party | Candidate | Votes | % | ±% |
|---|---|---|---|---|
| Labor | James Moiler | 3,299 | 50.3 | +5.0 |
| Liberal | John Waghorne | 1,489 | 22.7 | +22.7 |
| Country | Joseph Wroth | 1,267 | 19.3 | −35.4 |
| Democratic Labor | Arthur White | 259 | 3.9 | +3.9 |
| Independent | Joseph O'Callaghan | 245 | 3.7 | +3.7 |
| Total formal votes | | 6,559 | 96.1 | −0.2 |
| Informal votes | | 269 | 3.9 | +0.2 |
| Turnout | | 6,828 | 90.4 | −4.0 |
Two-party-preferred result
| Labor | James Moiler | 3,518 | 53.6 | +8.3 |
| Liberal | John Waghorne | 3,041 | 46.4 | +46.4 |
| Labor gain from Country | | Swing | +8.3 | |

=== Vasse ===
1971 Western Australian state election: Vasse
| Party | Candidate | Votes | % | ±% |
|---|---|---|---|---|
| Labor | Alexander Hemsley | 2,299 | 37.3 | +37.3 |
| Liberal | Barry Blaikie | 1,977 | 32.1 | −67.9 |
| Country | Colin Fyfe | 1,121 | 18.2 | +18.2 |
| Independent | Edward Packard | 457 | 7.4 | +7.4 |
| Democratic Labor | John Brennan | 306 | 5.0 | +5.0 |
| Total formal votes | | 6,160 | 97.9 | |
| Informal votes | | 130 | 2.1 | |
| Turnout | | 6,290 | 94.4 | |
Two-party-preferred result
| Liberal | Barry Blaikie | 3,231 | 52.4 | −47.6 |
| Labor | Alexander Hemsley | 2,929 | 47.6 | +47.6 |
| Liberal hold | | Swing | N/A | |

=== Victoria Park ===
1971 Western Australian state election: Victoria Park
| Party | Candidate | Votes | % | ±% |
|---|---|---|---|---|
| Labor | Ron Davies | 8,553 | 75.2 | −24.8 |
| Democratic Labor | Benjamin Ballantyne | 2,824 | 24.8 | +24.8 |
| Total formal votes | | 11,377 | 94.7 | |
| Informal votes | | 634 | 5.3 | |
| Turnout | | 12,011 | 90.5 | |
| Labor hold | | Swing | N/A | |

=== Warren ===
1971 Western Australian state election: Warren
| Party | Candidate | Votes | % | ±% |
|---|---|---|---|---|
| Labor | David Evans | 4,271 | 71.1 | +15.8 |
| Liberal | Murray Edwards | 1,418 | 23.6 | −17.0 |
| Democratic Labor | Alfred Whiteside | 321 | 5.3 | +1.2 |
| Total formal votes | | 6,010 | 96.9 | −1.4 |
| Informal votes | | 195 | 3.1 | +1.4 |
| Turnout | | 6,205 | 93.0 | −1.5 |
Two-party-preferred result
| Labor | David Evans | 4,319 | 71.9 | +14.5 |
| Liberal | Murray Edwards | 1,691 | 28.1 | −14.5 |
| Labor hold | | Swing | +14.5 | |

=== Wellington ===
1971 Western Australian state election: Wellington
| Party | Candidate | Votes | % | ±% |
|---|---|---|---|---|
| Liberal | Iven Manning | 2,564 | 43.0 | −57.0 |
| Labor | Leslie Pitcher | 2,424 | 40.6 | +40.6 |
| Country | Michael Glendon | 622 | 10.4 | +10.4 |
| Democratic Labor | Francis Cowcher | 236 | 4.0 | +4.0 |
| Independent | Francois Baljeu | 118 | 2.0 | +2.0 |
| Total formal votes | | 5,964 | 94.5 | |
| Informal votes | | 347 | 5.5 | |
| Turnout | | 6,311 | 92.3 | |
Two-party-preferred result
| Liberal | Iven Manning | 3,397 | 57.0 | −43.0 |
| Labor | Leslie Pitcher | 2,567 | 43.0 | +43.0 |
| Liberal hold | | Swing | N/A | |

=== Wembley ===
1971 Western Australian state election: Wembley
| Party | Candidate | Votes | % | ±% |
|---|---|---|---|---|
| Liberal | Ray Young | 6,937 | 48.0 | −52.0 |
| Labor | John Elsegood | 5,209 | 36.0 | +36.0 |
| Democratic Labor | Brian Peachey | 2,310 | 16.0 | +16.0 |
| Total formal votes | | 14,456 | 97.5 | |
| Informal votes | | 372 | 2.5 | |
| Turnout | | 14,828 | 92.9 | |
Two-party-preferred result
| Liberal | Ray Young | 8,899 | 61.6 | −38.4 |
| Labor | John Elsegood | 5,557 | 38.4 | +38.4 |
| Liberal hold | | Swing | N/A | |

== See also ==
- 1971 Western Australian state election
- Members of the Western Australian Legislative Assembly, 1971–1974
- Candidates of the Western Australian state election, 1971
