= Kalgoorlie–Boulder Community High School =

School in Western Australia

Location
- 99 Boomerang Crescent; Kalgoorlie, Western Australia; Eastern Goldfields; Western Australia; Australia; 30°46′04″S 121°28′45″E

Information
- Former name: Eastern Goldfields Senior High School
- Type: Public co-educational high school
- Motto: Respect, Organisation, Achievement, Resilience
- Established: 2006; 20 years ago
- Sister school: Eastern Goldfields College
- Educational authority: WA Department of Education
- Principal: Jeremy Bruse
- Staff: 107
- Years: 7–10
- Enrolment: 941 (2026)
- Schedule: Monday to Friday: 8:50am–2:50pm
- Colours: Navy blue and gold
- Website: www.kalgoorlie-boulderchs.wa.edu.au

Kalgoorlie–Boulder Community High School (KBCHS) is a comprehensive public co-educational high school located in Kalgoorlie, a regional centre located in the Eastern Goldfields region of Western Australia.

Along with Eastern Goldfields College the school was formerly known as Eastern Goldfields Senior High School until the campuses were separated.

== History ==
The school was established in 2006 and caters for students from Year 7 to Year 10. Paul Matthews was the inaugural principal and was followed by Terry Martino in 2010. Terry Martino moved to Northam Senior High School in 2013 and was replaced by the deputy principal Vicki Bogensperger. The current principal is Jeremy Bruse, since 2025.

Early in 2012 the school received a commendation award from the local chamber of commerce. The deputy principal, Vicki Bogensperger, accepted the award on behalf of Terry Martino and remarked "We are on an improvement journey at Kalgoorlie-Boulder Community High School and in a sense, the work will never be complete." Later the same year the school was reviewed by Expert Review Group appointed by the Department of Education. The director of the group commented on the "dramatic improvements at the school" in the areas of uniform, behaviour and mobile phone policy. The director, Brett Hunt, also commented "The school’s environment has a long history of being unsettled, but we found the current team has focused on developing a welcoming, structured and predictable environment for everyone."

At the start of the 4th term of 2016, the first stage of KBCHS' $45 million redevelopment program was completed and opened, which includes new English, Mathematics and Humanities building blocks, and previous buildings were demolished to make way for stages 2 and 3. In July 2017, the second stage was completed, which included the new Visual Arts and Eastern Goldfields Education Support Centre buildings. The third stage was completed and opened in late 2017, which involved landscaping and new pathways connecting stages 1 and 2, and fully completed the school's redevelopment.

In 2019, the school officially became an Independent Public School, establishing the school board for the school for various people to engage activities that enhance the school experience for students. The members of the board are a mix of staff, teachers, communities and parents.

== Enrolment ==
Enrolments at the school have fluctuated with total enrolments ranging from 510 (2010) to 1,036 (2015). The migration of Year 7 students to public high schools were the likely cause in the 301 enrolment number spike from 2014 to 2015.

Enrolments in Semester 2 of each school year
Year	2007	2008	2009	2010	2011	2012	2013	2014	2015	2016	2017	2018	2019	2020	2021	2022	2023	2024	2025	2026
No. of Enrolments	847	775	661	510	541	597	721	705	1,036	985	830	780	765	835	835	892	903	866	854	942
Change from previous year		–72	–114	–151	+31	+56	+124	–16	+301	–51	–155	–50	–15	+70		+57	+11	-37	-12	+88

== Incidents ==
The school had many reported incidents of violence in 2009 between indigenous and Maori students, resulting in cultural advisors being employed to tackle the problem.

The school was in the headlines in 2010 when a teacher set an assignment asking the students how they would launch a chemical or biological terrorist attack on an unsuspecting Australian community to kill as many civilians as possible. The assignment was withdrawn after students complained. The teacher was counselled.

In May of the same year, a male teacher was assaulted by a 13-year-old girl, the girl hit the man several times and was later charged by police for assaulting a public officer. The girl pulled out clumps of his hair and hit him with a bin, she had to be pulled off the teacher by his colleagues who heard his screams.

Another incident occurred in 2010 when a relief teacher was dismissed after students pushed, swore at and assaulted him. The teacher was ordered to leave the premises but later took the WA Department of Education to the industrial relations commission. It was found that the teacher was unfairly dismissed, the students involved having a history of falsely accusing teachers, and the department was ordered to rehire the teacher.

The school ranked second in the state, behind Gilmore College, for school suspensions given to students in 2010.

The school made the front page of The West Australian in early 2013 when it was revealed students from the school had formed 'fight clubs' where they would gather to watch students brawl with one another. Fights were recorded on video and posted to Facebook, as were details of upcoming fights. The police became involved and were planning additional patrols in the area. The principal, Terry Martino, called on the community to take a shared responsibility for the children's behavior.

In 2016 the school year commenced with 49 suspensions handed out to students in the first three weeks. In March of the same year a teacher was assaulted by a student, the teacher escaped serious injury and the student was suspended.

Just a day after the opening of the new English, Maths and HASS buildings in 2017, they were vandalised, smashing windows and causing other significant damage to the buildings. This incident forced the school to be closed for a day for repairs so that it was safe for students and staff members to return.

The school averaged six suspensions every day in 2024.

== See also ==
- List of schools in rural Western Australia
