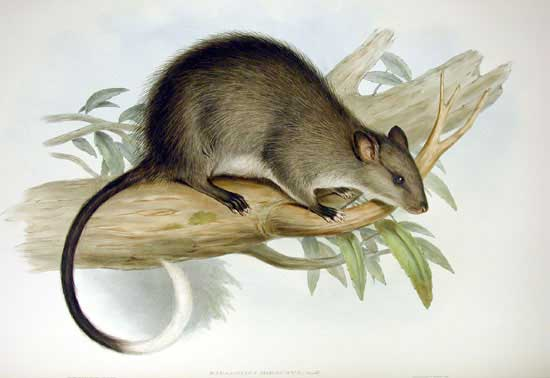
- Black-footed tree-rat (Mesembriomys gouldii)

Scientific classification
- Domain: Eukaryota
- Kingdom: Animalia
- Phylum: Chordata
- Class: Mammalia
- Order: Rodentia
- Family: Muridae
- Tribe: Hydromyini
- Genus: Mesembriomys; Palmer, 1906

Type species
- Mus hirsutus

Species
- Mesembriomys gouldii Mesembriomys macrurus

= Mesembriomys =

Mesembriomys Temporal range: Early Pleistocene to Recent

Genus of mammals

Mesembriomys is a genus of rodent in the family Muridae endemic to Australia. It contains the following species:

- Black-footed tree-rat (M. gouldii)
- Golden-backed tree-rat (M. macrurus)
