= Lachlan Island (Western Australia) =

Island of Western Australia

- Location within Western Australia

Geography
- Coordinates: 16°38′05″S 123°30′23″E
- Area: 1,180 ha (2,900 acres)

Administration
- Australia

Demographics
- Population: 0

Lachlan Island is an island off the Kimberley coast of Western Australia.

Situated at the northern end of King Sound approximately 50 kilometres (31 mi) east of Bardi, the island is part of the Buccaneer Archipelago.

The island occupies an area of 1,180 hectares (2,916 acres).

A survey in 2009 found populations of the endangered golden bandicoots and golden-backed tree-rats were present on the island.
