= Eastern Goldfields College =

Location
- 70 Cassidy Street; Kalgoorlie, Western Australia; Australia; 30°45′04″S 121°28′29″E

Information
- Type: Public co-educational high school
- Motto: Upward & Onward
- Established: 2006; 20 years ago
- Educational authority: WA Department of Education
- Principal: Dan McCormack
- Enrolment: 457 (2018)
- Campus type: Rural
- Colours: Navy blue and white
- Website: www.egc.wa.edu.au

Eastern Goldfields College (EGC) is a public co-educational high school, located in Kalgoorlie, Western Australia. It is located on the Curtin University campus in Kalgoorlie and shares many facilities with the university. The college accepts year 11 and 12 students from across the Goldfields region.

== History ==
The school was formerly a part of Eastern Goldfields Senior High School, but the school split in 2006 onto two separate campuses. The original site on Boomerang Crescent became Kalgoorlie-Boulder Community High School with classes for years 7–10. Senior students were moved to the local Curtin University campus and the students benefited from the high quality university facilities that were made available to them, particularly in the areas of trade and hospitality. The name of the school and its pegasus logo were made official in 2006.

== Notable alumni ==
- Matt Birney Member of the WA Legislative Assembly
- John Bowler Member of the WA Legislative Assembly (2001–2013) and Mayor of Kalgoorlie (2015–2023)
- George Brand Member of the WA Legislative Council
- Peter Collier Member of the WA Legislative Council
- Stan Dellar Member of the WA Legislative Council
- Rica Erickson Naturalist and botanical artist
- Ted Evans Member of the WA Legislative Assembly
- John Hunt Member of the WA Legislative Council
- Wally Langdon Sportsman for WA
- Ron Leeson Member of the WA Legislative Council
- John Read Member of the WA Legislative Assembly
- Ian Taylor Deputy Premier of WA (1990–1993)
- John Tonkin Premier of Western Australia (1971–1974)
- Maurice Williams Member of the WA Legislative Assembly

== Enrolment ==
Enrolments at the school were generally growing in the first three years, however it dipped significantly between 2011 and 2013.

Enrolments in Semester 2 of each school year (provided by the Department of Education)
Year	2007	2008	2009	2010	2011	2012	2013	2014	2015	2016	2017	2018	2019
No. of enrolments	395	573	608	605	559	488	389	436	460	470	456	457	427
Change from previous year		+178	+35	–3	–46	–73	–99	+47	+24	+10	–14	+1	–30

== Sport ==
The college competes annually at country week, which is a sporting competition held in Perth between country high schools. Eastern Goldfields has competed in sports including hockey, netball, basketball, football, soccer, volleyball, speech, and debate.

Eastern Goldfields has also competed in rugby union games against rival high school John Paul College (Kalgoorlie). This competition began in 2006 and is held annually. Both the Year 11 and 12's and the year 8-10's represent their own 15-man squads.

== See also ==
- List of schools in rural Western Australia
- Education in Australia
