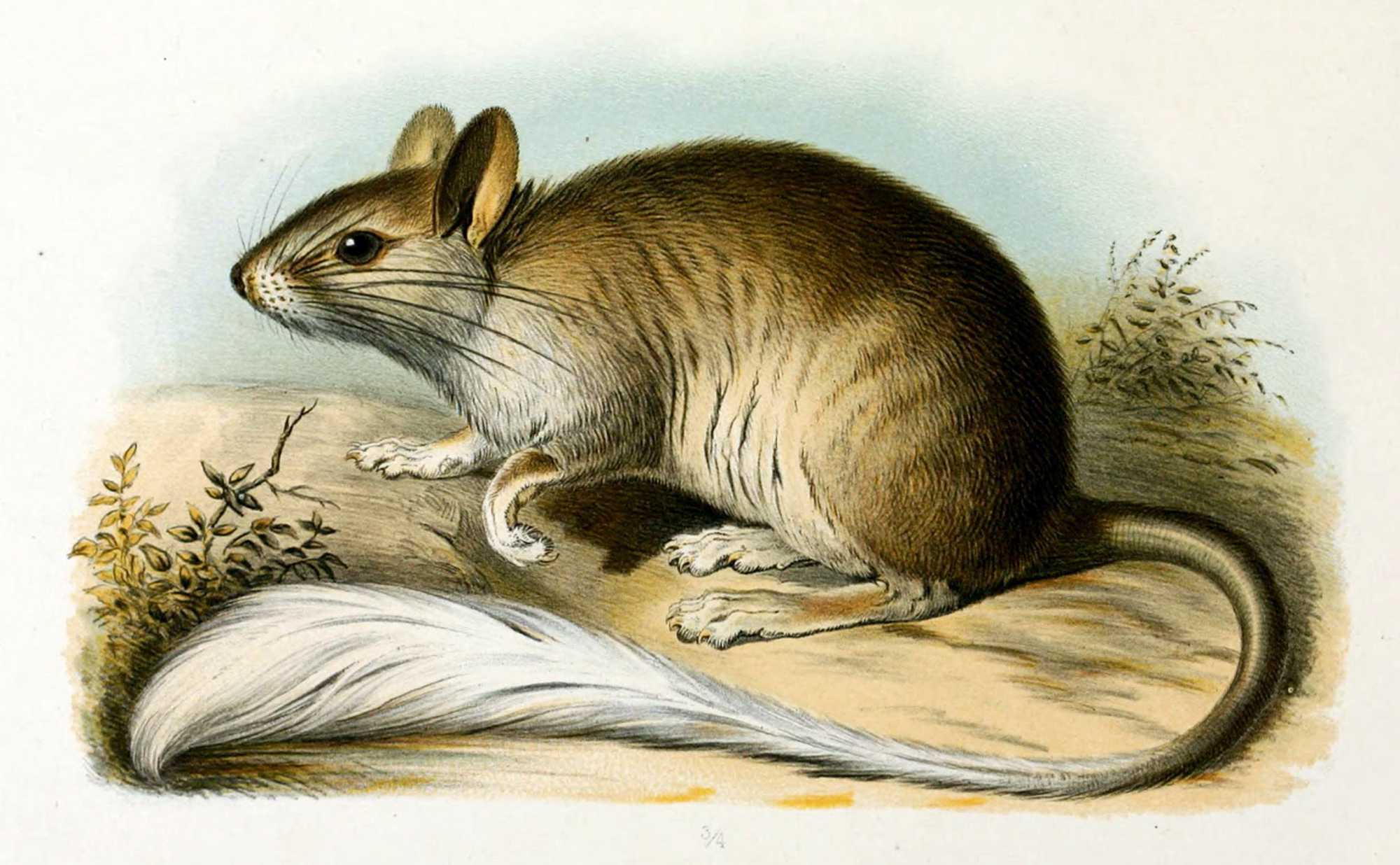

Conservation status
- Near Threatened (IUCN 3.1)

Scientific classification
- Kingdom: Animalia
- Phylum: Chordata
- Class: Mammalia
- Order: Rodentia
- Family: Muridae
- Genus: Mesembriomys
- Species: M. macrurus

Binomial name
- Mesembriomys macrurus (Peters, 1876)
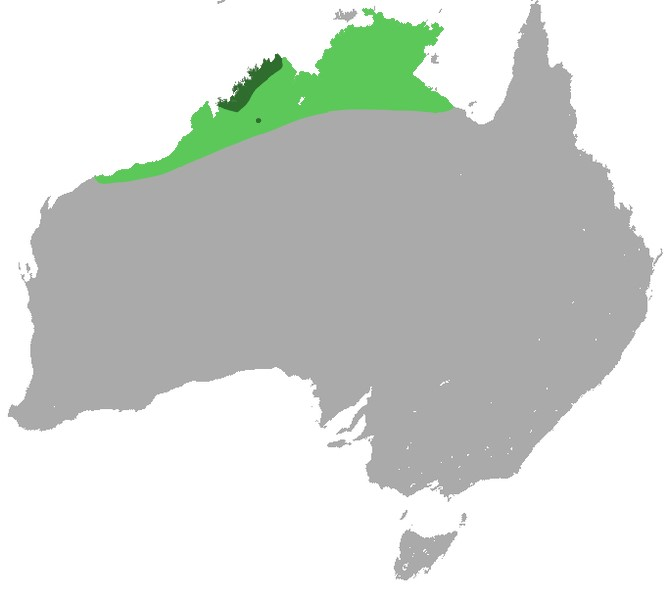
- Historical range (light green) and current range (dark green)

Synonyms
- Hapalotis boweri Ramsay, 1887

= Golden-backed tree-rat =

Golden-backed tree rat

Species of mammal

The golden-backed tree rat (Mesembriomys macrurus) is a species of rodent in the family Muridae, found only in Australia.

Its native range was across Northern Australia, but it has since become extinct from these regions. It is now only found in remote near-coastal areas in the Kimberley, Western Australia. It is present in the Charnley River–Artesian Range Wildlife Sanctuary.

== Description ==
Golden-backed tree rats are named for their broad stripe of golden-coloured fur that runs from the top of its head to the base of their tail, of which has a white brush tip. They are nocturnal and arboreal. During day, they sleep in their nests made in hollow trees, dense foliage or among rocks.

They range in size from 18 to 34 cm with a 29 to 36 cm tail, and weigh 200-330 grams.

Golden-backed tree rats are thought to breed throughout the year, with a gestation period of 48 days and litter size of 2. Their young are weaned at either six or seven weeks old. In captivity, the maximum longevity of a golden-back tree rat is 7.1 years.

=== Diet ===
The golden-backed tree rat forages mainly on fruits, travelling through areas with recently burnt vegetation to reach them. Their diet also consists of flowers, grasses and insects.

== Range and habitat ==
The golden-backed tree rat is endemic to Australia. Its range is known to have included parts of the Northern Territory, where only three historical records of its presence in the territory is known. These being the upper McArthur River in 1901, upper Mary River in 1903, and in the Deaf Adder George of Kakadu National Park in 1969. However, recent surveys have since failed to detect any signs of golden-backed tree rat populations in mainland NT. Local Australian Aboriginal knowledge from the Top End however suggests that the disappearance of golden-backed tree rats from the region occurred between the late 2000s and early 2010s. There is still however the possibility that the species is still present in the NT.

In Western Australia, the golden-backed tree rat once had a range across parts of the Pilbara and the Kimberley. Subfossils of the species have been identified in the Pilbara, and the type specimen originally came from near Roebourne in the Pilbara when the species was identified in 1875. During the 1800s in Broome, the golden-backed tree rat was once so common that it was considered a pest. When Norwegian zoologist Knut Dahl visited Broome in 1896, he recorded that they raided bags of rice and flour around town. However, since 1903 all known records of the species have been from areas of the north-west Kimberley with higher rainfall, and their presence in the Pilbara and drier parts of the Kimberley have ended.

The current distribution of golden-backed tree rats is restricted now to the north-west region of the Kimberley, approximately the area between Kalumburu to Yampi Sound. Here, it is found in the Artesian Range, Mitchell Plateau, Prince Regent National Park, and Yampi Sound. It has also been found in areas of the Wunaamin Miliwundi Ranges with suitable gorges in Central Kimberley. Its presence in the Mitchell Plateau is however recent, as it was first recorded there in 2012 after surveys between 2007 and 2012 found no results. This may suggest that golden-backed tree rats may be expanding locally. Golden-backed tree rat populations also occur on eleven islands off the Kimberley: Augustus, Buckle Head, Carlia, Chambers, Conilurus, Hidden, Jar, Lachlan, Uwins, Wollaston, and an unnamed island in the Scott Strait.

The current population of golden-backed tree rats is currently unknown.

== Conservation ==
=== Status ===
On 3 July 2016, the International Union for Conservation of Nature assessed the golden-backed tree rat and listed it as being near-threatened. Previously, the IUCN had ranked the species as being least-concern in 2008, and vulnerable in 1996. Under the Environment Protection and Biodiversity Conservation Act 1999, the species was listed in Australia as vulnerable from July 2000 to 2019 when it was delisted from the vulnerable category on 22 February by the Minister for the Environment and Water Melissa Price. Its conservation status in WA is vulnerable, while in the Northern Territory it is critically endangered.

=== Threats ===
The biggest threats to golden-backed tree rat populations are feral cats, and bushfires. Bushfires are particularly harmful to the species when there is an increase in extensive hot fires in the late dry season. These fires destroy the tree hollows and foliage they nest in, and also decreases the number of fruiting vegetation they eat from. Golden-backed tree rats may also be threatened by introduced herbivores such as cattle, who the Department of Climate Change, Energy, the Environment and Water state may alter "the availability of tall fruit bearing understorey shrubs" - an important food source for golden-backed tree rats.

=== Protection ===
A 2015 government conservation advice approved by a delegate of the Minister for the Environment, Greg Hunt, listed several conservation actions to protect golden-backed tree rat populations. Actions given high priority were the development of "appropriate fire management in [the] Kimberley", monitoring populations on the mainland and islands, and the involvement of Aboriginal rangers and communities in conservation efforts. Actions given medium priority were quarantining isolated island populations, and the reintroduction of golden-backed tree rats to the Northern Territory.

The Charnely River-Artesian Range Wildlife Sanctuary contains and protects a significant population of the golden-backed tree rat, with the species being reasonably common in the sanctuary. The Australian Wildlife Conservancy has also been active in the species' conservation, where it has collaborated with the University of Tasmania to investigate the effect of fires on them.

== In culture ==
The indigenous Wunambal people have traditionally used the tails of golden-backed tree rats to make special necklaces.

=== Name ===
Golden-backed tree rats are known as Koorrawal, Wunggangbarn, or Jari in Wunambal, and in the Yiiji dialect of Wunambal spoken by the Yeidji people, it is called Jari Manya.

A synonym for Mesembriomys macrurus is Hapalotis boweri, named by Edward Pierson Ramsay in 1887 when he incorrectly identified specimens forwarded by his friend and colleague Thomas Henry Boyer-Bower as a new species. Ramsay named Hapalotis boweri in honour of Boyer-Bower who had recently died.
