= Wollaston Island (Western Australia) =

Island in Kimberley region of Western Australia

- Location within Western Australia

Geography
- Coordinates: 14.4966°S 125.4697°E
- Area: 857 ha (2,120 acres)

Administration
- Australia

Demographics
- Population: 0

Wollaston Island is an island off the Kimberley coast of Western Australia.

The island is at the northern end of the Bonaparte Archipelago in Montague Sound approximately 1.5 kilometres (1 mi) offshore from the mainland.

The island occupies an area of 857 hectares (2,118 acres).

Threatened priority fauna found on the island include the golden-backed tree-rat, monjon and the golden bandicoot.
