= Melissa Price (politician) =

Australian politician (born 1963)

The Honourable Melissa Price MP
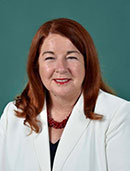

Minister for Science and Technology
- In office 8 October 2021 – 23 May 2022 Serving with Scott Morrison
- Prime Minister: Scott Morrison
- Preceded by: Christian Porter
- Succeeded by: Ed Husic

Minister for Defence Industry
- In office 26 May 2019 – 23 May 2022
- Prime Minister: Scott Morrison
- Minister: Linda Reynolds; Peter Dutton
- Preceded by: Linda Reynolds
- Succeeded by: Pat Conroy

Minister for the Environment
- In office 28 August 2018 – 26 May 2019
- Prime Minister: Scott Morrison
- Preceded by: Josh Frydenberg (Environment and Energy)
- Succeeded by: Sussan Ley

Assistant Minister for the Environment
- In office 20 December 2017 – 27 August 2018
- Prime Minister: Malcolm Turnbull; Scott Morrison
- Minister: Josh Frydenberg
- Preceded by: Office established
- Succeeded by: Office abolished

Member of the Australian Parliament for Durack
- Incumbent
- Assumed office 7 September 2013
- Preceded by: Barry Haase

Personal details
- Born: Melissa Lee Dellar; 12 December 1963 (age 62) Kalgoorlie, Western Australia, Australia
- Party: Liberal
- Spouse: Colyn Price (d. 2002)
- Relatives: David Dellar (grandfather); Stan Dellar (uncle)
- Education: London South Bank University; University of Western Australia
- Occupation: Politician
- Profession: Lawyer
- Website: melissapricemp.com.au

Melissa Lee Price (née Dellar; born 12 December 1963) is an Australian politician. She is a member of the Liberal Party and has served in the House of Representatives since 2013, representing the Western Australian seat of Durack. She held ministerial office in the Morrison government from 2018 to 2022, serving as Minister for the Environment (2018–2019), Minister for Defence Industry (2019–2022), and Minister for Science and Technology (2021–2022). She was also Assistant Minister for the Environment in the Turnbull government from 2017 to 2018.

== Early life ==
Price was born on 12 December 1963 in Kalgoorlie, Western Australia. She is the youngest of four children born to Lyn (née Blurton) and Ray Dellar, who worked in the mining industry. Her father campaigned for the Australian Labor Party (ALP) and her grandfather David Dellar and uncle Stan Dellar both represented the ALP in the Western Australian Legislative Council.

Price was educated in Kalgoorlie at St Mary's Catholic Primary School and Prendiville Catholic Girls College. She left school at the age of 15. In her maiden speech to parliament, she stated that she "enjoyed working in the hospitality and insurance industries, and also in management in the fast food industry, the grains industry and the mining industry [...] I was even an aerobics instructor at one point in my history". Price attended university as a mature-age student, graduating with the degree of Bachelor of Laws from London South Bank University and completing a graduate diploma in law at the University of Western Australia.

Price was a solicitor in private practice from 1997 to 2002. She subsequently worked at grain cooperative CBH Group as general counsel and business development manager until 2008, and then at iron ore miner Crosslands Resources as vice-president of legal and business development until 2012. Price was also a non-executive director of the Cancer Council of Western Australia and the BrightSpark Foundation until 2016.

== Politics ==
Price unsuccessfully contested the state seat of Kalgoorlie at the March 2013 state election. In July 2013 she won Liberal preselection for the federal seat of Durack, following the retirement of the incumbent MP Barry Haase. She retained Durack for the Liberals at the September 2013 federal election, with the Nationals candidate Shane van Styn finishing second on the two-candidate-preferred count.

Price served on the speaker's panel from 2015 to 2016 and was chair of the House of Representatives standing committee on indigenous affairs from 2016 to 2017. She was re-elected at the 2016 federal election, despite being challenged for Liberal preselection by geologist and global warming denier David Archibald.

Price is a member of the Centrist faction of the Liberal Party, after previously being aligned with the Centre-Right faction during the Morrison government years.

=== Government minister ===
In December 2017, Price was appointed Assistant Minister for the Environment in the Turnbull government, under environment minister Josh Frydenberg. During the 2018 Liberal leadership spills, she reportedly voted for incumbent prime minister Malcolm Turnbull against Peter Dutton in the first vote. She told the Australian Financial Review that "a change of leader would be political suicide". Following Turnbull's withdrawal, she voted for Scott Morrison against Dutton in a second vote days later. Price was subsequently appointed Minister for the Environment in the Morrison government and elevated to cabinet.

As environment minister, Price attended the 2018 United Nations Climate Change Conference in Poland. The Australian reported that she had met with state environment ministers prior to the conference and proposed a strategy that "would put the onus on the states to lead environmental policy", but that she "failed to secure agreement on a national action plan on climate change yesterday after the states rejected the wording". In March 2019, Price attributed bushfires in Western Australia and Victoria to climate change. In the lead-up to the 2019 federal election, she was "front and centre of Scott Morrison's push to highlight his government’s environmental records and policies including a $3.3bn Climate Solutions Fund and a commitment to Snowy Hydro 2.0".

In April 2019, Price gave ministerial approval to an environmental management plan for the Adani Group's controversial Carmichael coal mine in Queensland. Her final approval came several days after she was advised by her department to approve the plan, delayed in order to seek further detail about the mine's impact on groundwater. As a result "a delegation of Queensland MPs and the Prime Minister met over concerns that Ms Price was refusing to sign off on the plan in the face of intense lobbying by federal Liberal MPs in Victoria". A few days later, Price gave ministerial approval to the Yeelirrie uranium mine in Western Australia. She had previously stated that she would wait for the outcome of a Supreme Court of Western Australia case on state government approval of the mine before granting her own approval.

Following the Coalition's re-election at the 2019 federal election, Price was removed from cabinet but retained in the outer ministry as Minister for Defence Industry. This was widely reported as a demotion, with the Australian Financial Review stating that she had been "unable to comfortably answer media questions about her portfolio". In her first speech in the portfolio, delivered to an Australian Industry Group meeting, she stated that she wanted to "maximise the involvement and success of Australian SMEs" in the defence industry. In March 2021, Morrison reappointed Price to cabinet, seeking to increase the proportion of women in the wake of sexual misconduct allegations. She was appointed to the Naval Shipbuilding Enterprise Governance Committee, a subcommittee of the National Security Committee. Price served in these roles until May 2022, following the appointment of the Albanese ministry.

=== Controversy ===
Price caused controversy in her role as Environment Minister by allegedly telling Anote Tong, the former president of Kiribati and climate change advocate, "I know why you're here. It is for the cash. For the Pacific it's always about the cash. I have my chequebook here. How much do you want?"

=== Climate change ===
In a November 2025 Liberal Party debate about climate change action, Price argued that “MPs would lose their seats and the party would be seen as a laughing stock if they moved against the globally recognised emissions reductions framework” – nonetheless Price was in the minority and the Liberal Party dumped its previous policy in support of reaching net zero emissions by 2050.

== Personal life ==
Price's husband Colyn died in 2002 of melanoma. The couple had one daughter, Rhiannon, who died in 2013 at the age of 18. As of 2015 Price was in a relationship with Brad Bell, a quantity surveyor, who has two children from a prior marriage.

As of 2019 Price lived in Geraldton, having "recently moved" after previously living outside of her electorate in the Perth suburb of Marmion.

Price supports the Fremantle Dockers in the Australian Football League.

Political offices
Preceded by Christian Porter	Minister for Science and Technology; 2021–2022	Succeeded by Ed Husic
Preceded by Linda Reynolds	Minister for Defence Industry; 2019–2022	Succeeded by Pat Conroy
Preceded by Josh Frydenberg as Minister for the Environment and Energy	Minister for the Environment; 2018–2019	Succeeded by Sussan Ley
New ministerial post	Assistant Minister for the Environment; 2017–2018	Succeeded by Herself as Minister for the Environment
Parliament of Australia
Preceded by Barry Haase	Member for Durack; 2013–present	Incumbent
