= David Dellar =

Australian politician

Member of the Legislative Council of Western Australia
- In office 29 June 1963 – 21 May 1965
- Preceded by: William Hall
- Succeeded by: None (seat abolished)
- Constituency: North-East Province

Personal details
- Born: 30 October 1915 Kanowna, Western Australia, Australia
- Died: 30 January 1994 (aged 78) Kalgoorlie, Western Australia, Australia
- Party: Labor

David Peter Dellar (30 October 1915 – 30 January 1994) was an Australian politician who served as a Labor Party member of the Legislative Council of Western Australia from 1963 to 1965, representing North-East Province.

Dellar was born in Kanowna, Western Australia, to Eileen Grace (née Henderson) and Benjamin James Dellar. He was educated at state schools in Menzies and Salmon Gums before going on to the Kalgoorlie School of Mines. After finishing his education, Dellar worked for periods on the mines at Linden, Menzies, Kanowna, and Kalgoorlie. He enlisted in the Australian Army in 1942, initially with an anti-aircraft unit and later as a troop instructor. Dellar was discharged in 1946, and returned to mining.

In 1959, Dellar was elected to the Kalgoorlie Road Board, where he served until 1969. A long-time member of the Labor Party, he was elected to parliament at a Legislative Council by-election in June 1963, caused by the death of William Hall. Dellar's constituency was abolished in a redistribution before the 1965 state election. He attempted to transfer to the new Lower North Province but was defeated by George Brand of the Liberal Party. After leaving politics, Dellar worked as a manager for Atlas Copco until 1974 and then as a prospector. He died in Kalgoorlie in January 1994, aged 78. Dellar's son, Stan Dellar, and granddaughter, Melissa Price, also became members of parliament.
