= Ron Leeson =

Australian trade unionist and politician

Member of the Western Australian Legislative Council
- In office 22 May 1971 – 21 May 1983
- Preceded by: Jim Garrigan
- Succeeded by: Mark Nevill
- Constituency: South-East Province

Personal details
- Born: Ronald Thomas Leeson; 26 February 1939 Laverton, Western Australia, Australia
- Died: 24 March 2025 (aged 86) Perth, Western Australia, Australia
- Party: Labor

Ronald Thomas Leeson (26 February 1939 – 24 March 2025) was an Australian politician who was a Labor Party member of the Western Australian Legislative Council from 1971 to 1983, representing the South-East Province.

Leeson was born in Laverton, a remote town in Western Australia's Goldfields, to Amelia May (née Lawer) and George Thomas Leeson. He attended Eastern Goldfields High School before going on to the Kalgoorlie School of Mines, and subsequently worked as a fitter and turner. From 1967 to 1972, he also served as secretary of the Amalgamated Engineering Union. Leeson was elected to parliament at the 1971 state election, replacing Jim Garrigan. He was re-elected to a second six-year term at the 1977 election. At the 1983 election, Leeson attempted to transfer to South Province, but was defeated by David Wordsworth (the sitting Liberal Party member). After leaving parliament, he was a committee member of the WA Greyhound Racing Board.

Leeson died on 24 March 2025. Peter Dowding paid tribute, saying that "he was a champion for workers’ rights during his union years and an advocate for community recreational opportunities during his time in Parliament".
