= George Brand (politician) =

Australian politician

Member of the Legislative Council of Western Australia
- In office 22 May 1965 – 21 May 1971
- Preceded by: None (new seat)
- Succeeded by: Stan Dellar
- Constituency: Lower North Province

Personal details
- Born: 11 March 1911 Kalgoorlie, Western Australia, Australia
- Died: 5 March 1997 (aged 85) Shepparton, Victoria, Australia
- Party: Liberal

George Edmund Dowd Brand (11 March 1911 – 5 March 1997) was an Australian politician who served as a Liberal Party member of the Legislative Council of Western Australia from 1965 to 1971, representing Lower North Province.

Brand was born in Kalgoorlie to Brigid Katherine (née Dowd) and George Brand. He attended Eastern Goldfields High School and then began working as a clerk for Western Australian Government Railways. He later joined his father's freight business. Brand enlisted in the Australian Imperial Force in 1943 (after previous service with the Citizens Military Forces), and during the war served in transport and supply units. He was discharged in 1945 and returned to the family business, taking it over completely following the death of his father in 1957.

In 1955, Brand was elected to the Kalgoorlie Municipal Council, where he served until 1965. He first stood for parliament at the 1956 state election, but was defeated in the seat of Kalgoorlie by Tom Evans of the Labor Party. Brand contested the Legislative Council at the 1965 state election, winning the newly created Lower North Province against David Dellar (the Labor member for the abolished North-East Province). He served a single six-year term, losing his seat by just four votes at the 1971 election to Stan Dellar, the son of his 1965 opponent. Brand eventually retired to Shepparton, Victoria, dying there in 1997. Incidentally he was unrelated to Sir David Brand, Western Australia's premier 1959–1971.
