= Stan Dellar =

Australian politician

Member of the Legislative Council of Western Australia
- In office 22 May 1971 – 21 May 1977
- Preceded by: George Brand
- Succeeded by: Norman Moore
- Constituency: Lower North Province

Personal details
- Born: 29 November 1936 Kalgoorlie, Western Australia, Australia
- Died: 11 April 2015 (aged 78) Exmouth, Western Australia, Australia
- Party: Labor

Stanley James Dellar (29 November 1936 – 11 April 2015) was an Australian politician who served as a Labor Party member of the Legislative Council of Western Australia from 1971 to 1977, representing Lower North Province.

Dellar was born in Kalgoorlie to Gladys Jean (née McDonald) and David Peter Dellar. His father was also a member of parliament. Dellar attended Eastern Goldfields High School, and after leaving began working as a clerk for the Kalgoorlie Road Board. He later worked as a clerk for local government bodies in Bridgetown (1959 to 1963), Carnarvon (1964 to 1967), and Exmouth (1967 to 1970). Dellar entered parliament at the 1971 state election, defeating George Brand of the Liberal Party by just four votes. He served a single six-year term before losing his seat to Norman Moore at the 1977 election. Dellar worked as a truck driver after leaving politics, and served on the Exmouth Shire Council from 1979 to 1982. His niece, Melissa Price, is a member of federal parliament.

He died in Exmouth in April 2015, aged 78.
