= Thomas Perry (Australian politician) =

Australian politician

The Honourable Thomas Perry

Member of the Legislative Council of Western Australia
- In office 22 May 1965 – 21 May 1977
- Preceded by: None (new seat)
- Succeeded by: Sandy Lewis
- Constituency: Lower Central Province

Personal details
- Born: 17 January 1914 Collie, Western Australia, Australia
- Died: 8 March 1998 (aged 84) Collie, Western Australia, Australia
- Party: Country

Thomas Oswald Perry (17 January 1914 – 8 March 1998) was an Australian politician who was a Country Party member of the Legislative Assembly of Western Australia from 1965 to 1977.

Perry was born in Collie to Lillian Cunningham (née Liddle) and Charles Leonard Perry. He left school at the age of 13, working on his father's farm in Darkan which he eventually took over. Perry served on the West Arthur Shire Council from 1946 to 1965, and was shire president from 1949 to 1958. He entered parliament at the 1965 state election, winning election to the new Lower Central Province. Perry was re-elected to a second six-year term at the 1971 election, and retired from parliament at the 1977 election. He died in Collie in March 1998, aged 84. He had married Margaret Joan Trigwell in March 1941, with whom he had three children.
