= Lower North Province =

Electoral province of the Western Australian Legislative Council

The Lower North Province was a two-member electoral province of the Western Australian Legislative Council, located in the central and northern parts of the state. For nearly its entire existence, it had the lowest enrolment of any province in the Council. It was one of several rural seats created following the enactment of the Constitution Acts Amendment Act (No.2) 1963, and became effective on 22 May 1965.

In 1989, the province was abolished by the Acts Amendment (Electoral Reform) Act 1987, and was absorbed into the Mining and Pastoral region under the new proportional voting system.

== Geography ==
The province was made up of two complete Legislative Assembly districts, which changed at each distribution.

Redistribution	Period	Electoral districts	Electors	% of State
1963–64	22 May 1965 – 22 May 1968	Gascoyne, Murchison-Eyre	7,265	1.96
1966	22 May 1968 – 22 May 1974	Gascoyne, Murchison-Eyre	4,133	1.00
1972	22 May 1974 – 22 May 1977	Gascoyne, Murchison-Eyre	5,252	0.95
1976	22 May 1977 – 22 May 1983	Gascoyne, Murchison-Eyre	5,689	0.90
1982	22 May 1983 – 22 May 1989	Gascoyne, Murchison-Eyre	5,694	0.80

== Representation ==
=== Members ===
Member 1	Party	Term	Member 2	Party	Term
George Brand	Liberal	1965–1971	Eric Heenan	Labor	1965–1968
Stan Dellar	Labor	1971–1977	George Berry	Liberal	1968–1980
Norman Moore	Liberal	1977–1989	Phil Lockyer	Liberal	1980–1989
