= 1971 Western Australian state election =

1971 Western Australian election

- 20 February 1971

All 51 seats in the Western Australian Legislative Assembly and 15 (of the 30) seats to the Western Australian Legislative Council 26 Assembly seats were needed for a majority
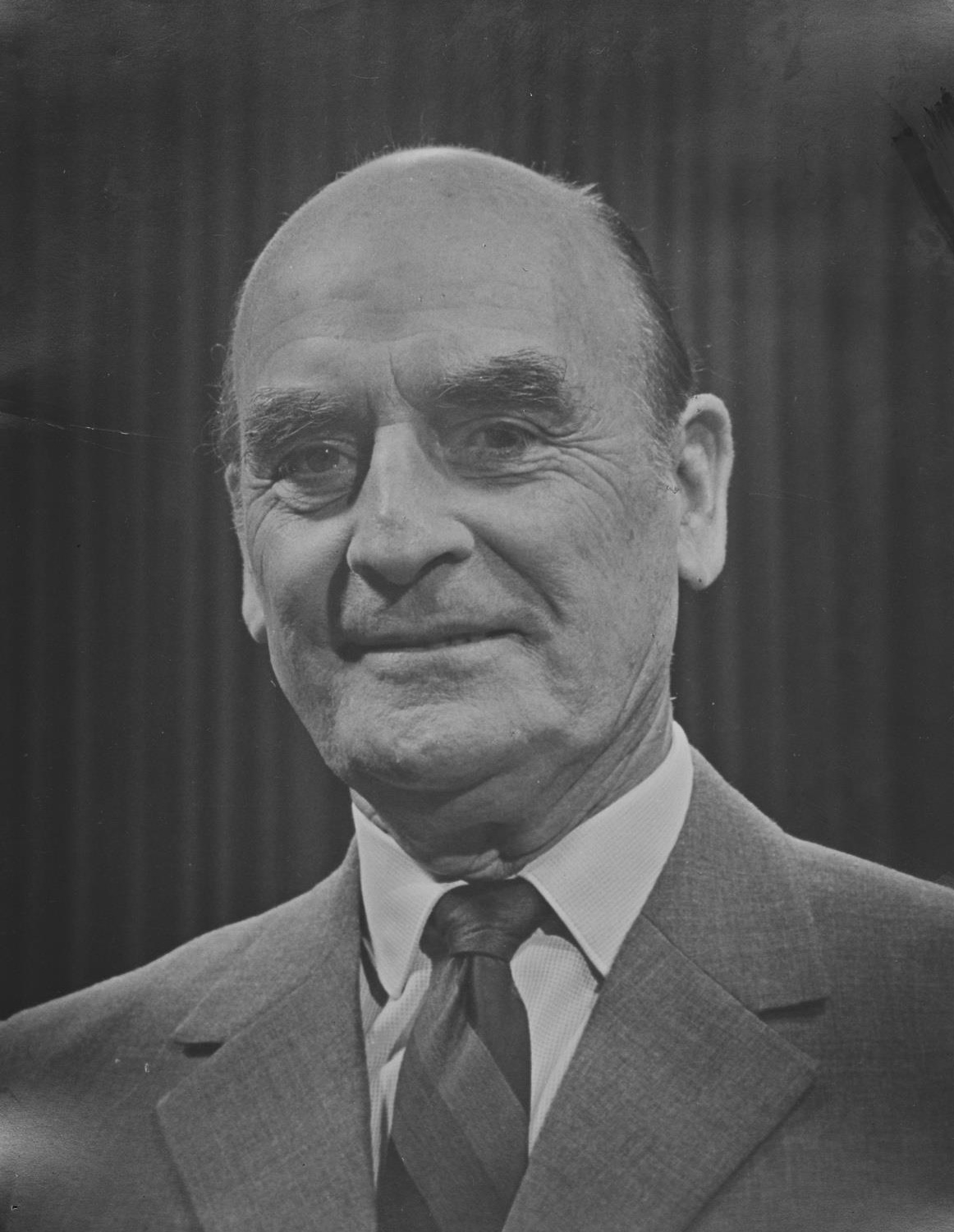

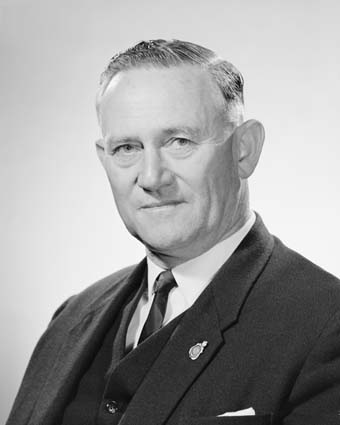
	First party	Second party
Leader	John Tonkin	David Brand
Party	Labor	Liberal/Country coalition
Leader since	1 January 1967	1 March 1957
Leader's seat	Melville	Greenough
Last election	23 seats	28 seats
Seats won	26 seats	25 seats
Seat change	▲3	▼3
Percentage	48.91%	35.30%
Swing	▲3.56	▼13.95
Premier before election
David Brand
Liberal/Country coalition
Elected Premier
John Tonkin
Labor

Elections were held in the state of Western Australia on 20 February 1971 to elect all 51 members to the Legislative Assembly and 15 members to the 30-seat Legislative Council. The four-term Liberal-Country Party coalition government, led by Premier David Brand, was defeated by the Labor Party, led by Opposition Leader John Tonkin.

This was the first election in which no seats were uncontested since the introduction of responsible government in 1890. This was partly due to the Democratic Labor Party deciding to contest every seat up for election in both Houses.

There was a large increase in the number of electors, because this was the first election after 18 year olds had been given the vote.

== Results ==
=== Legislative Assembly ===
Western Australian state election, 20 February 1971 Legislative Assembly << 1968–1974 >>
Enrolled voters	537,122				
Votes cast	490,467		Turnout	91.31%	+0.41%
Informal votes	18,897		Informal	3.85%	+0.75%
Summary of votes by party
Party	Primary votes	%	Swing	Seats	Change
Labor	230,653	48.91%	+3.56%	26	+ 3
Liberal	139,865	29.66%	–14.34%	17	– 2
Country	26,604	5.64%	+0.39%	8	– 1
Democratic Labor	50,508	10.71%	+7.45%	0	± 0
United Farmers	3,511	0.74%	+0.74%	0	± 0
Communist	2,265	0.48%	–0.05%	0	± 0
Other parties	2,687	0.57%	–0.12%	0	± 0
Independent	15,477	3.28%	+2.36%	0	± 0
Total	471,570			51	

=== Legislative Council ===
Western Australian state election, 20 February 1971 Legislative Council
Enrolled voters	537,122				
Votes cast	489,911		Turnout	91.21%	–1.08%
Informal votes	25,084		Informal	5.12%	+0.63%
Summary of votes by party
Party	Primary votes	%	Swing	Seats won	Seats held
Labor	217,465	46.78%	+0.12%	4	10
Liberal	127,191	27.36%	–9.64%	9	13
Country	25,035	5.39%	–6.19%	2	7
Democratic Labor	67,891	14.61%	+12.17%	0	0
United Farmers	5,782	1.24%	+1.24%	0	0
Independent	21,463	4.62%	+2.26%	0	0
Total	464,827			15	30

== Post-election pendulum ==
Labor seats (26)
Marginal
Mirrabooka	Arthur Tonkin	ALP	1.7%
Karrinyup	Stan Lapham	ALP	2.0%
Merredin-Yilgarn	Jim Brown	ALP	2.7%
Toodyay	James Moiler	ALP	3.6%
Albany	Wyndham Cook	ALP	5.1%
Clontarf	Donald May	ALP	5.5%
Fairly safe
Mount Hawthorn	Ron Bertram	ALP	7.4%
Geraldton	Bill Sewell	ALP	8.3%
Canning	Tom Bateman	ALP	8.6%
Maylands	John Harman	ALP	9.4%
Perth	Terry Burke	ALP	9.9%
Safe
Northam	Ken McIver	ALP	11.3% v IND
Gascoyne	Daniel Norton	ALP	11.8%
Pilbara	Arthur Bickerton	ALP	13.5% v DLP
Melville	John Tonkin	ALP	15.6%
Belmont	Colin Jamieson	ALP	16.1% v IND
Balcatta	Herb Graham	ALP	16.6% v DLP
Fremantle	Harry Fletcher	ALP	17.3%
Kalgoorlie	Tom Evans	ALP	20.0%
Warren	David Evans	ALP	21.9%
Victoria Park	Ron Davies	ALP	25.2% v DLP
Swan	John Brady	ALP	25.5% v DLP
Ascot	Merv Toms	ALP	25.8% v DLP
Boulder-Dundas	Tom Hartrey	ALP	28.5% v IND
Collie	Tom Jones	ALP	29.8%
Cockburn	Don Taylor	ALP	32.0% v DLP

Liberal/Country seats (25)
Marginal
Bunbury	Maurice Williams	LIB	1.2%
Roe	Bill Young	CP	1.3% v IND
Murchison-Eyre	Peter Coyne	LIB	2.3%
Vasse	Barry Blaikie	LIB	2.4%
Darling Range	Ian Thompson	LIB	3.0%
Murray	Ewart Runciman	LIB	3.2%
Subiaco	Tom Dadour	LIB	4.9%
Fairly safe
Dale	Cyril Rushton	LIB	6.0%
Mount Lawley	Ray O'Connor	LIB	6.8%
Wellington	Iven Manning	LIB	7.0%
Narrogin	William Manning	CP	7.7%
Cottesloe	Ross Hutchinson	LIB	9.7%
Safe
Stirling	Matt Stephens	CP	10.2%
South Perth	Bill Grayden	LIB	10.5%
Blackwood	David Reid	CP	11.6% v LIB
Wembley	Ray Young	LIB	11.6%
Katanning	Crawford Nalder	CP	11.7%
Floreat	Andrew Mensaros	LIB	12.5%
Kimberley	Alan Ridge	LIB	12.6%
East Melville	Des O'Neil	LIB	16.6%
Moore	Edgar Lewis	CP	17.2%
Greenough	David Brand	LIB	18.4%
Mount Marshall	Ray McPharlin	CP	22.6%
Nedlands	Charles Court	LIB	24.9%
Avon	Harry Gayfer	CP	30.5% v IND

== See also ==
- Candidates of the 1971 Western Australian state election
- Members of the Western Australian Legislative Assembly, 1968–1971
- Members of the Western Australian Legislative Assembly, 1971–1974
