= Candidates of the 2001 Western Australian state election =

The 2001 Western Australian state election was held on 10 February 2001.

== Retiring Members ==
=== Labor ===
- Ted Cunningham MLA (Girrawheen)
- Julian Grill MLA (Eyre)
- Bill Thomas MLA (Cockburn)
- Diana Warnock MLA (Perth)
- Cheryl Davenport MLC (South Metropolitan)
- Bob Thomas MLC (South West)

=== Liberal ===
- Kevin Minson MLA (Greenough)
- George Strickland MLA (Innaloo)
- Max Evans MLC (North Metropolitan)
- Muriel Patterson MLC (South West)

=== National ===
- Bob Wiese MLA (Wagin)
- Murray Montgomery MLC (South West)

=== Independent ===
- Ernie Bridge MLA (Kimberley)

== Legislative Assembly ==
Sitting members are shown in bold text. Successful candidates are highlighted in the relevant colour. Where there is possible confusion, an asterisk (*) is also used. Note that liberals for forests, while an organised group, was not in fact registered as a political party by the Western Australian Electoral Commission.

Electorate	Held by	Labor candidate	Liberal candidate	Nationals candidate	One Nation candidate	Greens candidate	Other candidates
Albany	Liberal	Peter Watson	**Kevin Prince**		Darrall Simpson	Sandy Davis	Diane Evers (LFF); John Watson (Ind)
Alfred Cove	Liberal		**Doug Shave**		Terry Corbett	Elizabeth Peak	Denise Brailey (Ind); John Grayden (Ind); Amanda-Sue Markham (CDP); Pam Neesham (Ind); Jamie Paterson (Dem); Janet Woollard* (LFF)
Armadale	Labor	**Alannah MacTiernan**			Colin Butler	Thomas Chvojka	Everald Cortis (Ind); Madeleine Goiran (CDP); John Hoare (Dem); Roger Stubbs (Ind)
Avon	National	Phil Shearer	Joanne Burges	**Max Trenorden**	Ken Collins	Kate Elsey	Peter Morton (Ind); Stuart Smith (Ind)
Ballajura	Liberal	John D'Orazio	**Rhonda Parker**		Carl Evans	Rosalba Jeffreys	Patrick Cranley (CDP); Jason Meotti (Dem)
Bassendean	Labor	**Clive Brown**	Ramesh Somasunderam		Sandra Vinciullo	Leanne Lewis	Jack Fox (Dem); Colleen Tapley (CDP)
Belmont	Labor	**Eric Ripper**	Glenys Godfrey		Bill Gaugg	Cliff Holdom	Richard Aguero (Dem); Brett Crook (CDP)
Bunbury	Liberal	Tony Dean	**Ian Osborne**		Alan Giorgi	Marilyn Palmer	Alfred Bussell (Ind); Geoffrey (Ind); Ron Hellyer (Dem); Brendan Kelly (Ind); Mary Lupi (Ind)
Burrup	Labor	**Fred Riebeling**	Robin Vandenberg		Chris Dempsey	Scott Ryan	
Carine	Liberal	Vijay Kumar	**Katie Hodson-Thomas**		Gary Evans	Phill Farren	Eleanor Bell (Ind); Carol Clarke (LFF); Ray Moran (CDP); Helen Van Noort (Dem)
Churchlands	Independent	David Michael	Marlene Anderton			Candice Heedes	**Liz Constable*** (Ind); Christine Emerson (Dem); Mary Minorgan (CDP)
Cockburn	Labor	Fran Logan	Sandra Comley		Jerry Gier	Heather Smedley	Andrew Donaldson (Dem)
Collie	National	Mick Murray	Steve Thomas	**Hilda Turnbull**	Jan Hough	Peter Murphy	Frank Marciano (Ind); Andrew Williams (Ind)
Cottesloe	Liberal	Simon Nield	**Colin Barnett**		Dianne Kenworthy	Steve Walker	Andrew Winchester (Dem)
Darling Range	Liberal	Geoff Stallard	**John Day**		Tom Greig	Cathrine Hall	Gail Kelly (Dem); Frank Lindsey (LFF)
Dawesville	Liberal	John Hughes	**Arthur Marshall**		Carl Dacheff	Matthew Bartley	Don Pember (Ind)
Eyre	Labor	John Bowler	Laurie Ayers		Neville Smith		Suzie Williams (Ind)
Fremantle	Labor	**Jim McGinty**	Rita Scolaro		Bob Johnston	Ian Alexander	Anthony Benbow (Ind); William Hall (Dem); Fred Parker (Ind); Steve Ratcliffe (Ind)
Geraldton	Liberal	Shane Hill	**Bob Bloffwitch**	Brendin Flanigan	Ross Paravicini		Ron Ashplant (Ind); Mark Douglas (Ind); Stephen Gyorgy (Ind); Jackie Healy (Ind); Don Rolston (Ind); Noel Sharp (Ind); Michael Walton (Ind)
Girrawheen	Labor	Margaret Quirk	Isabelle Adams		Andy Nebro	Katherine Navarro	Jim Kerr (Dem); Keith Mynard (Ind)
Greenough	Liberal	Michelle Bone	Jamie Edwards	Kevin Altham	Pam McCagh		David Whitehead (Ind)
Hillarys	Liberal	Lorraine Allen	**Rob Johnson**		Sue Collins	Andrew Roy	Stuart Chapman (CDP); Eugene Hands (Ind); Clive Oliver (Dem)
Innaloo	Liberal	John Quigley	Wayne McCurry		Evelyn Grove	Emmie Lister	Mark Beaver (Ind); Graham Brown (Dem)
Joondalup	Liberal	Tony O'Gorman	**Chris Baker**		Jeanette Radisich	Steve Magyar	Sarah Gilfillan (Dem); Michael Mortimer (Ind); Helen Sawyer (CDP)
Kalgoorlie	Labor	**Megan Anwyl**	Matt Birney		Guy Hopkins	Deborah Botica	Ian Burt (Ind); Don Green (Ind); Duncan Griffin (Ind)
Kimberley	Independent	Carol Martin	Lyne Page	Peter McCumstie	Wayne Boys	Andrei Nikulinsky	Byne Terry (Ind); Mike Wevers (Ind)
Kingsley	Liberal	Jon Davies	**Cheryl Edwardes**		Susan Mansell	Jemma Tyley	Pamela Dell (LFF); Mike Ewers (CDP); Kerry Lock (Dem)
Mandurah	Liberal	David Templeman	**Roger Nicholls**		Martin Suter	Beryl Francis	Don Hatch (Ind); John Smith (Ind)
Maylands	Labor	**Judy Edwards**	Bev Brennan		Bill Goulthorp	Corinne Glenn	Troy Ellis (Ind); Neil Gray (Ind); Michael Phillips-Ryder (Dem)
Merredin	National	Sharon Ivey		**Hendy Cowan**	John McKay	Robert Jeffreys	Don Cowan (Ind); Callum Payne (Ind)
Midland	Labor	**Michelle Roberts**	Ian James		David Gunnyon	Jane Bremmer	Peter Bucknell (Ind); John Burt (Ind); Kev Cusworth (Ind); Charles Eadon-Clarke (Ind); Peter Markham (Dem)
Mitchell	Liberal	Margaret Lane	**Dan Sullivan**		Andy Konnecke	Patsie Gubler	Elizabeth Hellyer (Dem); Lyn Kearsley (Ind); Ross Slater (Ind)
Moore	Liberal	Darren West	**Bill McNee**	Sue Metcalf	Stephen Peters	Adrian Glamorgan	
Murdoch	Liberal	Gavin Waugh	**Mike Board**			Felicity McGeorge	Carole Pestana (Dem)
Murray-Wellington	Liberal	Patricia Briggs	**John Bradshaw**		Joe Dacheff		Ian Campbell (Ind); Brian McCarthy (Ind)
Nedlands	Liberal	Neil Roberts	**Richard Court**		Bill Edgar	Elena Jeffreys	Ashley Buckle (Dem); Liz Davenport (LFF); Doug Greypower (Ind)
Ningaloo	Liberal	Samantha Ogden	**Rod Sweetman**		John Cope	John Blinkhorn	Lex Fullarton (Ind); Marcus Lindsay (Dem)
Nollamara	Labor	**John Kobelke**	Aaron Gray		Keith Anderson	Kayt Davies	Hasan Demirkol (Ind); Paul McCutcheon (Dem)
Peel	Labor	**Norm Marlborough**	John Wootton		Bill Holmes	Jeff McGinniss	Alan Grafton (Ind); Lynette Lowery-Small (Ind); John Vickers (Ind); Craig Wakeford (Dem)
Perth	Labor	John Hyde	Peter Boyle		John Hakesley	Su-Hsien Lee	Dave Chambers (Ind); Paul Hubbard (Dem); Roberto Jorquera (Ind); Julius Re (Ind)
Pilbara	Labor	Jackie Ormsby	Mark Liedel		Gavin Ness		**Larry Graham** (Ind)
Riverton	Liberal	Tony McRae	**Graham Kierath**		Aida Konstek	Marilyn Ashton	Jamie Bekkers (Dem); Li Chen (Ind); Anita Matsen (Ind)
Rockingham	Labor	**Mark McGowan**	Jodie Payne		Maz Fiannaca	Monique Keel	Gordon Heyes (Ind); Dean Richter (Dem)
Roe	National	Steve Boni	Anthony Fels	**Ross Ainsworth**	Bob Hodgkinson		Steve Leeder (Ind)
Roleystone	Liberal	Martin Whitely	**Fred Tubby**		Bill Cox	Margo Beilby	Gaye Cranfield (Dem); Bill Love (Ind); Craig Watson (CDP)
South Perth	Independent	Daniel Smith	Andrew Murfin			Paul Smith	Claire Allison (Ind); **Phillip Pendal*** (Ind); Mark Reynolds (Dem)
Southern River	Liberal	Paul Andrews	**Monica Holmes**		Peter Hopkins	Luke Edmonds	Dean Craig (Dem); Roger Davenport (Ind); John Parker (Ind); Michelle Shave (CDP)
Stirling	National	Ian Bishop		**Monty House**	Darius Crowe	Paul Llewellyn	Ken Drummond (Ind)
Swan Hills	Liberal	Jaye Radisich	**June van de Klashorst**		Ian Whittaker	Sharon Davies	Michael Barrett (Dem); John Daw (LFF)
Thornlie	Labor	**Sheila McHale**	Julie Brown		Kevin Koevort	Tina McVicar	Stephen Crabbe (Dem); Terry Ryan (CDP); Anwar Sayed (Ind)
Vasse	Liberal	Ross Brommell	**Bernie Masters**	Beryle Morgan	Patricia Embry	Bill Franssen	John Partridge (Dem)
Victoria Park	Labor	**Geoff Gallop**	Sandra Brown		Peter David	Juanita Miller	Andrew Fox (Ind); Collin Mullane (Dem)
Wagin	National	Allison Madson	Judith Adams	Terry Waldron	Henk Meydam	Stewart Jackson	Jean Robinson (Ind)
Wanneroo	Labor	Dianne Guise	**Iain MacLean**		Ron Holt	Miguel Castillo	Eric Couzens (Ind); Dave Fort (Ind); Patti Lock (Dem)
Warren-Blackwood	Liberal	Veronica Keating	**Paul Omodei**		Tony Drake	Peter Lane	Chris Davies (LFF); Allan Martin (Ind); Hayden Rice (Ind)
Willagee	Labor	**Alan Carpenter**	Nerina Lewis		Warren Higgs	Diannah Johnston	Florence Evans (Dem)
Yokine	Liberal	Bob Kucera	**Kim Hames**		James Ring	Heather Aquilina	Aaron Hewett (Dem); Ron Samuel (Ind); Penny Searle (Ind)

== Legislative Council ==
Sitting members are shown in bold text. Tickets that elected at least one MLC are highlighted in the relevant colour. Successful candidates are identified by an asterisk (*).

=== Agricultural ===
Five seats were up for election. The Labor Party was defending one seat. The Liberal Party was defending two seats. The National Party was defending two seats.

Labor candidates	Liberal candidates	National candidates	One Nation candidates	Greens candidates	Democrats candidates
1. **Kim Chance***; 2. Dale Piercey; 3. Kelly Shay; 4. Cathryn Backer	1. **Bruce Donaldson***; 2. **Murray Nixon**; 3. Stuart Adams; 4. Brian Reading; 5. Margaret Rowe	1. **Murray Criddle***; 2. **Dexter Davies**; 3. Geoff Gill; 4. Chris Nelson; 5. Allan Marshall; 6. Gavin Davis	1. Frank Hough*; 2. Ron McLean; 3. Leonard Hamersley	1. Dee Margetts*; 2. Kate Davis	1. Marilyn Rock; 2. Malcolm McKercher
Independent candidates	Ungrouped candidates				
1. A. E. Harvey; 2. Malcolm Talbot	Ramon Kennedy				

=== East Metropolitan ===
Five seats were up for election. The Labor Party was defending two seats. The Liberal Party was defending two seats. The Australian Democrats were defending one seat.

Labor candidates	Liberal candidates	One Nation candidates	Greens candidates	Democrats candidates	CDP candidates
1. **Nick Griffiths***; 2. **Ljiljanna Ravlich***; 3. Louise Pratt*; 4. John Carruthers; 5. Brad George; 6. Emiliano Barzotto	1. **Peter Foss***; 2. **Derrick Tomlinson***; 3. Bill Munro; 4. Deborah Hopper; 5. Ken Shephard	1. Robin Scott; 2. Marye Daniels	1. Lee Bell; 2. Alison Xamon	1. **Norm Kelly**; 2. Julie Ward	1. Gerard Goiran; 2. Derk Gans
Independent candidates		Ungrouped candidates			
1. Megan Kirwan; 2. Simon Makin	1. Alan Bateson; 2. Linda Bateson	Joan Torr; Tom Hoyer; John Tucak			

=== Mining and Pastoral ===
Five seats were up for election. The Labor Party was defending three seats. The Liberal Party was defending two seats.

Labor candidates	Liberal candidates	National candidates	One Nation candidates	Greens candidates	Democrats candidates
1. **Tom Stephens***; 2. Jon Ford*; 3. Kevin Leahy; 4. Liz Tassell; 5. Margaret Vincent; 6. Mike Anderton	1. **Norman Moore***; 2. **Greg Smith**; 3. Isabelle Scott; 4. Ken Baston; 5. John Fawcett	1. Dudley Maslen; 2. Paul Ausburn; 3. Peter Kneebone	1. John Fischer*; 2. Wayne Trembath; 3. Irene Wyborn	1. Robin Chapple*; 2. Scott Ludlam	1. Don Hoddy; 2. Pam Heald
Independent candidates		Ungrouped candidates			
1. **Mark Nevill**; 2. Randy Spargo; 3. Janenell Sibosado	1. **Tom Helm**; 2. Diane Mills	Vin Cooper; Murray Kennedy			

=== North Metropolitan ===
Seven seats were up for election. The Labor Party was defending two seats. The Liberal Party was defending three seats. The Australian Democrats were defending one seat. The Greens WA were defending one seat.

Labor candidates	Liberal candidates	One Nation candidates	Greens candidates	Democrats candidates	CDP candidates
1. **Ed Dermer***; 2. **Ken Travers***; 3. Graham Giffard*; 4. Batong Pham; 5. Roslyn Harley; 6. Andrew Waddell	1. **George Cash***; 2. **Ray Halligan***; 3. Alan Cadby*; 4. Peter Collier; 5. Michael Sutherland; 6. Andre Shannon; 7. Alan Carstairs	1. Gerry Kenworthy; 2. Leeann Hopkins	1. **Giz Watson***; 2. Cameron Poustie; 3. Brenda Roy	1. **Helen Hodgson**; 2. Tim Law	1. Dwight Randall; 2. Brian Peachey
Independent candidates		Ungrouped candidates			
1. Ismail Fredericks; 2. Sam Basri	1. Michael Whiteside; 2. Ismail Julius	Audrey Anderson; Bronislaw Tabaczynski; David Berry			

=== South Metropolitan ===
Five seats were up for election. The Labor Party was defending two seats. The Liberal Party was defending two seats. The Greens WA were defending one seat.

Labor candidates	Liberal candidates	One Nation candidates	Greens candidates	Democrats candidates	Group D candidates	Ungrouped candidates
1. Sue Ellery*; 2. Kate Doust*; 3. Sylvia Mortas; 4. Liam Costello; 5. Kim Young; 6. Chilip Foo	1. **Barbara Scott***; 2. **Simon O'Brien***; 3. Alison Gibson; 4. Barry Pound; 5. Margaret Thomas	1. Tony Dines; 2. Sandra Rawlings	1. **Jim Scott***; 2. Lynn MacLaren	1. Jakiica Zaknic; 2. Pam Townshend	1. Adrian Bennett; 2. June Bennett	Rick Finney; Eddie Hwang; Peter Van De Zuidwind; Lawrence Shave

=== South West ===
Seven seats were up for election. The Labor Party was defending two seats. The Liberal Party was defending three seats. The National Party was defending one seat. The Greens WA were defending one seat.

Labor candidates	Liberal candidates	National candidates	One Nation candidates	Greens candidates	Democrats candidates	Ungrouped candidates
1. **John Cowdell***; 2. Adele Farina*; 3. Matt Benson-Lidholm; 4. Ursula Richards; 5. Patricia Creevey; 6. Garry Newman	1. **Barry House***; 2. **Bill Stretch***; 3. Robyn McSweeney*; 4. John Silcock; 5. Nigel Hallett; 6. Robert Nicholson; 7. Craig Carbone	1. Mal Cameron; 2. Steve Dilley; 3. Gordon Smith	1. Paddy Embry*; 2. Peter O'Reilly; 3. Judith South	1. **Chrissy Sharp***; 2. Basil Schur; 3. Judy Trembath	1. Alf Denman; 2. Alison Wylie	Glen Wood (Ind); Ken Gunson (Ind); Justin Moseley (CDP); Terry Iturbide (Ind)

== See also ==
- Members of the Western Australian Legislative Assembly, 1996–2001
- Members of the Western Australian Legislative Assembly, 2001–2005
- Members of the Western Australian Legislative Council, 1997–2001
- Members of the Western Australian Legislative Council, 2001–2005
- 2001 Western Australian state election
