= Members of the Western Australian Legislative Assembly, 1993–1996 =

This is a list of members of the Western Australian Legislative Assembly from 1993 to 1996:

Name	Party	District	Years in office
Ross Ainsworth	National	Roe	1989–2005
Megan Anwyl^{[4]}	Labor	Kalgoorlie	1996–2001
Colin Barnett	Liberal	Cottesloe	1990–2018
Mike Barnett	Labor	Rockingham	1974–1996
Barry Blaikie	Liberal	Vasse	1971–1996
Bob Bloffwitch	Liberal	Geraldton	1991–2001
Mike Board	Liberal	Jandakot	1993–2005
John Bradshaw	Liberal	Wellington	1983–2005
Ernie Bridge	Labor/Independent^{[5]}	Kimberley	1980–2001
Clive Brown	Labor	Morley	1993–2005
Nick Catania	Labor	Balcatta	1989–1996
Jim Clarko	Liberal	Marmion	1974–1996
Liz Constable	Independent	Floreat	1991–2013
Richard Court	Liberal	Nedlands	1982–2001
Hendy Cowan	National	Merredin	1974–2001
Ted Cunningham	Labor	Marangaroo	1988–2001
John Day	Liberal	Darling Range	1993–2017
Cheryl Edwardes	Liberal	Kingsley	1989–2005
Judy Edwards	Labor	Maylands	1990–2008
Geoff Gallop	Labor	Victoria Park	1986–2006
Larry Graham	Labor	Pilbara	1989–2005
Julian Grill	Labor	Eyre	1977–2001
Kay Hallahan	Labor	Armadale	1993–1996
Kim Hames	Liberal	Dianella	1993–2001, 2005–2017
Yvonne Henderson	Labor	Thornlie	1983–1996
Gordon Hill^{[2]}	Labor	Helena	1982–1994
Monty House	National	Stirling	1986–2005
Rob Johnson	Liberal	Whitford	1993–2017
Graham Kierath	Liberal	Riverton	1989–2001
John Kobelke	Labor	Nollamara	1989–2013
Carmen Lawrence^{[1]}	Labor	Glendalough	1986–1994
Kevin Leahy	Labor	Northern Rivers	1989–1996
Richard Lewis	Liberal	Applecross	1986–1996
Norm Marlborough	Labor	Peel	1986–2006
Arthur Marshall	Liberal	Murray	1993–2005
Jim McGinty	Labor	Fremantle	1990–2009
Bill McNee	Liberal	Moore	1983–1986; 1989–2005
Kevin Minson	Liberal	Greenough	1989–2001
Roger Nicholls	Liberal	Mandurah	1989–2001
Paul Omodei	Liberal	Warren	1989–2008
Ian Osborne	Liberal	Bunbury	1993–2001
Rhonda Parker^{[2]}	Liberal	Helena	1994–2001
Phillip Pendal	Liberal/Independent^{[3]}	South Perth	1993–2005
Kevin Prince	Liberal	Albany	1993–2001
Fred Riebeling	Labor	Ashburton	1992–2008
Eric Ripper	Labor	Belmont	1988–2013
Michelle Roberts^{[1]}	Labor	Glendalough	1994–2025
Doug Shave	Liberal	Melville	1989–2001
David Smith	Labor	Mitchell	1983–1996
Wayde Smith	Liberal	Wanneroo	1993–1996
George Strickland	Liberal	Scarborough	1989–2001
Ian Taylor^{[4]}	Labor	Kalgoorlie	1981–1996
Bill Thomas	Labor	Cockburn	1986–2001
Max Trenorden	National	Avon	1986–2008
Fred Tubby	Liberal	Roleystone	1988–2001
Hilda Turnbull	National	Collie	1989–2001
June van de Klashorst	Liberal	Swan Hills	1993–2001
Diana Warnock	Labor	Perth	1993–2001
Judyth Watson	Labor	Kenwick	1986–1996
Bob Wiese	National	Wagin	1987–2001

== Notes ==
^{1} On 14 February 1994, the Labor member for Glendalough and former premier, Carmen Lawrence, resigned to contest a federal by-election for the seat of Fremantle. Labor candidate Michelle Roberts won the resulting by-election on 19 March 1994.
^{2} On 4 August 1994, the Labor member for Helena, Gordon Hill resigned. Liberal candidate Rhonda Parker won the resulting by-election on 10 September 1994.
^{3} On 30 March 1995, the Liberal member for South Perth, Phillip Pendal, left the party to serve as an independent, ultimately doing so until his retirement in 2005.
^{4} On 4 February 1996, the Labor member for Kalgoorlie and Opposition Leader, Ian Taylor, resigned to run for the federal seat of Kalgoorlie at the 1996 federal election. Labor candidate Megan Anwyl won the resulting by-election on 16 March 1996.
^{5} On 27 July 1996, the Labor member for Kimberley, Ernie Bridge, left the party to serve as an independent.

== Sources ==
- "Former Members" (PDF). Parliament of Western Australia. 2011. Archived from the original (PDF) on 7 August 2011.
