= Members of the Western Australian Legislative Assembly, 1996–2001 =

This is a list of members of the Western Australian Legislative Assembly from 1996 to 2001:

Name	Party	District	Years in office
Ross Ainsworth	National	Roe	1989–2005
Megan Anwyl	Labor	Kalgoorlie	1996–2001
Chris Baker	Liberal	Joondalup	1996–2001
Colin Barnett	Liberal	Cottesloe	1990–2018
Bob Bloffwitch	Liberal	Geraldton	1991–2001
Mike Board	Liberal	Murdoch	1993–2001
John Bradshaw	Liberal	Murray-Wellington	1983–2005
Ernie Bridge	Independent	Kimberley	1980–2001
Clive Brown	Labor	Bassendean	1993–2005
Alan Carpenter	Labor	Willagee	1996–2009
Liz Constable	Independent	Churchlands	1991–2013
Richard Court	Liberal	Nedlands	1982–2001
Hendy Cowan	National	Merredin	1974–2001
Ted Cunningham	Labor	Girrawheen	1988–2001
John Day	Liberal	Darling Range	1993–2017
Cheryl Edwardes	Liberal	Kingsley	1989–2005
Judy Edwards	Labor	Maylands	1990–2008
Geoff Gallop	Labor	Victoria Park	1986–2006
Larry Graham	Labor/Independent^{[1]}	Pilbara	1989–2005
Julian Grill	Labor	Eyre	1977–2001
Kim Hames	Liberal	Yokine	1993–2001, 2005–2017
Katie Hodson-Thomas	Liberal	Carine	1996–2008
Monica Holmes	Liberal	Southern River	1996–2001
Monty House	National	Stirling	1986–2005
Rob Johnson	Liberal	Hillarys	1993–2017
Graham Kierath	Liberal	Riverton	1989–2001
John Kobelke	Labor	Nollamara	1989–2013
Jim McGinty	Labor	Fremantle	1990–2009
Mark McGowan	Labor	Rockingham	1996–2023
Sheila McHale	Labor	Thornlie	1996–2008
Iain MacLean	Liberal	Wanneroo	1996–2001
Bill McNee	Liberal	Moore	1983–1986; 1989–2005
Alannah MacTiernan	Labor	Armadale	1996–2010
Norm Marlborough	Labor	Peel	1986–2006
Arthur Marshall	Liberal	Dawesville	1993–2005
Bernie Masters	Liberal	Vasse	1996–2005
Kevin Minson	Liberal	Greenough	1989–2001
Roger Nicholls	Liberal	Mandurah	1989–2001
Paul Omodei	Liberal	Warren-Blackwood	1989–2008
Ian Osborne	Liberal	Bunbury	1993–2001
Rhonda Parker	Liberal	Ballajura	1994–2001
Phillip Pendal	Independent	South Perth	1993–2005
Kevin Prince	Liberal	Albany	1993–2001
Fred Riebeling	Labor	Burrup	1992–2008
Eric Ripper	Labor	Belmont	1988–2013
Michelle Roberts	Labor	Midland	1994–2025
Doug Shave	Liberal	Alfred Cove	1989–2001
George Strickland	Liberal	Innaloo	1989–2001
Dan Sullivan	Liberal	Mitchell	1996–2008
Rod Sweetman	Liberal	Ningaloo	1996–2005
Bill Thomas	Labor	Cockburn	1986–2001
Max Trenorden	National	Avon	1986–2008
Fred Tubby	Liberal	Roleystone	1988–2001
Hilda Turnbull	National	Collie	1989–2001
June van de Klashorst	Liberal	Swan Hills	1993–2001
Diana Warnock	Labor	Perth	1993–2001
Bob Wiese	National	Wagin	1987–2001

^{1} On 15 February 2000, the Labor member for Pilbara, Larry Graham, left the party to serve as an Independent after losing preselection to recontest his seat at the 2001 state election. He defeated the endorsed Labor candidate at the election.
