= Electoral results for the district of Ballajura =

Western Australian district election results

This is a list of electoral results for the Electoral district of Ballajura in Western Australian elections. It was a marginal seat held by both major parties over the course of its existence. Ahead of the 2008 Western Australian state election the seat was abolished.

== Members for Ballajura ==
Member	Party	Term
Rhonda Parker	Liberal	1996–2001
John D'Orazio	Labor	2001–2006
John D'Orazio	Independent	2006–2008

== Election results ==
=== Elections in the 2000s ===
2005 Western Australian state election: Ballajura
Party	Candidate	Votes	%	±%
Labor	John D'Orazio	13,094	56.1	+9.1
Liberal	David Maxwell	6,883	29.5	−9.2
Greens	Michael Boswell	1,183	5.1	+1.1
Christian Democrats	Allan Ribbons	959	4.1	+1.9
Family First	John Clifford	816	3.5	+3.5
One Nation	Gary Evans	385	1.7	−4.0
Total formal votes		23,320	93.7	−1.4
Informal votes		1,575	6.3	+1.4
Turnout		24,895	92.1	
Two-party-preferred result
Labor	John D'Orazio	14,809	63.5	+8.7
Liberal	David Maxwell	8,506	36.5	−8.7
Labor hold		Swing	+8.7	

2001 Western Australian state election: Ballajura
Party	Candidate	Votes	%	±%
Labor	John D'Orazio	11,549	47.1	+6.6
Liberal	Rhonda Parker	9,452	38.5	−5.0
One Nation	Carl Evans	1,405	5.7	+5.7
Greens	Rosalba Jeffreys	993	4.0	+0.7
Democrats	Jason Meotti	593	2.4	−0.7
Christian Democrats	Patrick Cranley	544	2.2	+2.2
Total formal votes		24,536	95.0	+0.7
Informal votes		1,300	5.0	−0.7
Turnout		25,836	93.0	
Two-party-preferred result
Labor	John D'Orazio	13,428	55.0	+5.1
Liberal	Rhonda Parker	11,007	45.0	−5.1
Labor gain from Liberal		Swing	+5.1	

=== Elections in the 1990s ===
1996 Western Australian state election: Ballajura
Party	Candidate	Votes	%	±%
Liberal	Rhonda Parker	9,974	43.5	−1.6
Labor	John D'Orazio	9,273	40.5	−1.9
Marijuana	Dave Sayer	869	3.8	+3.8
Greens	Heather Aquilina	750	3.3	+1.0
Independent	Robert Farrell	712	3.1	+3.1
Democrats	Jim Kerr	703	3.1	+2.7
Independent	Raymond Nelson	643	2.8	+2.8
Total formal votes		22,924	94.2	−1.7
Informal votes		1,402	5.8	+1.7
Turnout		24,326	92.5	
Two-party-preferred result
Liberal	Rhonda Parker	11,463	50.1	−1.5
Labor	John D'Orazio	11,419	49.9	+1.5
Liberal hold		Swing	−1.5	
