= Electoral results for the district of Morley =

Western Australian district election results

This is a list of electoral results for the electoral district of Morley in Western Australian state elections.

== Members for Morley ==
Morley (1974–1983)
Member	Party	Term
Arthur Tonkin	Labor	1974–1983
Morley-Swan (1983–1989)
Member	Party	Term
Arthur Tonkin	Labor	1983–1987
Frank Donovan	Labor	1987–1989
Morley (1989–1996)
Member	Party	Term
Frank Donovan	Labor	1989–1991
Frank Donovan	Independent	1991–1993
Clive Brown	Labor	1993–1996
Morley (2008–present)
Member	Party	Term
Ian Britza	Liberal	2008–2017
Amber-Jade Sanderson	Labor	2017–present

== Election results ==
=== Elections in the 2020s ===
2025 Western Australian state election: Morley
Party	Candidate	Votes	%	±%
Labor	Amber-Jade Sanderson	12,918	50.7	−18.6
Liberal	Aswath Chavittupara	7,479	29.4	+12.7
Greens	Kaelin Charles Abrahams	2,888	11.3	+5.0
One Nation	Conor Doyle	1,179	4.6	+2.6
Christians	Giulio G. Di Somma	660	2.6	−0.5
Shooters, Fishers, Farmers	Cameron Yates	351	1.4	+1.4
Total formal votes		25,475	94.7	−0.6
Informal votes		1,439	5.3	+0.6
Turnout		26,914	87.1	+2.5
Two-party-preferred result
Labor	Amber-Jade Sanderson	15,795	62.0	−15.8
Liberal	Aswath Chavittupara	9,671	38.0	+15.8
Labor hold		Swing	−15.8	

Results are not final. Last updated on 31 March 2025 at 6:30 PM AWST

2021 Western Australian state election: Morley
Party	Candidate	Votes	%	±%
Labor	Amber-Jade Sanderson	17,447	70.4	+18.0
Liberal	Jim Seth	3,931	15.9	−15.7
Greens	Thomas Marcinkowski	1,525	6.2	−3.2
Christians	Alan Wells	815	3.3	+0.5
One Nation	Julian Scully	452	1.8	+1.8
No Mandatory Vaccination	Rhonda Kerslake	396	1.6	+1.6
WAxit	Aman Singh	217	0.9	−0.8
Total formal votes		24,783	95.5	+1.4
Informal votes		1,176	4.5	−1.4
Turnout		25,959	86.2	−1.2
Two-party-preferred result
Labor	Amber-Jade Sanderson	19,458	78.6	+16.2
Liberal	Jim Seth	5,311	21.4	−16.2
Labor hold		Swing	+16.2	

=== Elections in the 2010s ===
2017 Western Australian state election: Morley
Party	Candidate	Votes	%	±%
Labor	Amber-Jade Sanderson	10,946	51.4	+11.9
Liberal	Ian Britza	6,860	32.2	−17.7
Greens	Anne-Marie Ricciardi	2,017	9.5	+2.6
Christians	Lois Host	580	2.7	+0.6
Shooters, Fishers, Farmers	Paul Longo	523	2.5	+2.5
Micro Business	Nasim Boksmati	351	1.6	+1.6
Total formal votes		21,277	94.1	+2.6
Informal votes		1,340	5.9	−2.6
Turnout		22,617	88.0	−0.6
Two-party-preferred result
Labor	Amber-Jade Sanderson	13,064	61.4	+16.2
Liberal	Ian Britza	8,203	38.6	−16.2
Labor gain from Liberal		Swing	+16.2	

2013 Western Australian state election: Morley
Party	Candidate	Votes	%	±%
Liberal	Ian Britza	9,932	49.9	+14.7
Labor	Reece Whitby	7,868	39.5	+1.7
Greens	Sally Palmer	1,371	6.9	−3.2
Christians	Ross Fraser	430	2.2	−1.2
Family First	Greg Halls	305	1.5	+1.5
Total formal votes		19,906	90.5	
Informal votes		1,851	9.5	
Turnout		21,757	89.9	
Two-party-preferred result
Liberal	Ian Britza	10,889	54.7	+5.5
Labor	Reece Whitby	9,003	45.3	−5.5
Liberal gain from Labor		Swing	+5.5	

=== Elections in the 2000s ===
2008 Western Australian state election: Morley
Party	Candidate	Votes	%	±%
Labor	Reece Whitby	7,010	35.7	−15.9
Liberal	Ian Britza	6,797	34.7	+1.1
Independent	John D'Orazio	3,145	16.0	+16.0
Greens	Sally Palmer	1,687	8.6	+2.6
Christian Democrats	Andrew Partington	635	3.2	−0.7
Independent	Azeem Shah	337	1.7	+1.7
Total formal votes		19,611	93.6	+0.3
Informal votes		1,340	6.4	−0.3
Turnout		20,951	89.2	
Two-party-preferred result
Liberal	Ian Britza	9,969	50.9	+10.8
Labor	Reece Whitby	9,629	49.1	−10.8
Liberal gain from Labor		Swing	+10.8	

=== Elections in the 1990s ===
1993 Western Australian state election: Morley
Party	Candidate	Votes	%	±%
Labor	Clive Brown	10,275	49.7	−12.7
Liberal	John Horobin	6,971	33.7	−3.9
Independent	Karry-Lea Smith	3,421	16.6	+16.6
Total formal votes		20,667	94.9	−1.6
Informal votes		1,116	5.1	+1.6
Turnout		21,783	94.4	+2.0
Two-party-preferred result
Labor	Clive Brown	11,913	57.6	−4.8
Liberal	John Horobin	8,754	42.4	+4.8
Labor hold		Swing	−4.8	

=== Elections in the 1980s ===
1989 Western Australian state election: Morley
Party	Candidate	Votes	%	±%
Labor	Frank Donovan	10,808	62.4	−5.2
Liberal	David MacGregor	6,522	37.6	+5.2
Total formal votes		17,330	96.5	
Informal votes		630	3.5	
Turnout		17,960	92.4	
Labor hold		Swing	−5.2	

1987 Morley-Swan state by-election
Party	Candidate	Votes	%	±%
Labor	Frank Donovan	10,087	56.9	−10.0
Liberal	Kim Hames	6,361	35.8	+2.7
One Australia	Donald Jackson	1,294	7.3	+7.3
Total formal votes		17,742	95.5	−1.2
Informal votes		840	4.5	+1.2
Turnout		18,582	82.1	10.1
Labor hold		Swing	N/A	

- Preferences were not distributed.

1986 Western Australian state election: Morley-Swan
Party	Candidate	Votes	%	±%
Labor	Arthur Tonkin	13,440	66.9	−2.2
Liberal	Christine Fisher	6,659	33.1	+4.6
Total formal votes		20,099	96.7	+1.7
Informal votes		675	3.3	−1.7
Turnout		20,774	92.2	+3.4
Labor hold		Swing	−4.0	

1983 Western Australian state election: Morley-Swan
Party	Candidate	Votes	%	±%
Labor	Arthur Tonkin	10,743	69.1	
Liberal	Ramsay Bogunovich	4,436	28.5	
Independent	James Connolly	375	2.4	
Total formal votes		15,554	95.0	
Informal votes		819	5.0	
Turnout		16,373	88.8	
Two-party-preferred result
Labor	Arthur Tonkin	11,028	70.9	
Liberal	Ramsay Bogunovich	4,526	29.1	
Labor hold		Swing		

1980 Western Australian state election: Morley
Party	Candidate	Votes	%	±%
Labor	Arthur Tonkin	9,866	64.7	+6.4
Liberal	Kevin Egan	5,374	35.3	−6.4
Total formal votes		15,240	95.7	−0.7
Informal votes		691	4.3	+0.7
Turnout		15,931	89.5	−1.5
Labor hold		Swing	+6.4	

=== Elections in the 1970s ===
1977 Western Australian state election: Morley
Party	Candidate	Votes	%	±%
Labor	Arthur Tonkin	8,346	58.3	
Liberal	Madge Bicknell	5,980	41.7	
Total formal votes		14,326	96.4	
Informal votes		528	3.6	
Turnout		14,854	91.0	
Labor hold		Swing		

1974 Western Australian state election: Morley
Party	Candidate	Votes	%	±%
Labor	Arthur Tonkin	9,570	57.4	
Liberal	Lloyd Stewart	7,093	42.6	
Total formal votes		16,663	97.2	
Informal votes		478	2.8	
Turnout		17,141	92.1	
Labor hold		Swing		
