= Gallop ministry =

Government of Western Australia from 2001 to 2005

The Gallop Ministry was the 33rd Ministry of the Government of Western Australia, and was led by Labor Premier Geoff Gallop and his deputy, Eric Ripper. It succeeded the Court–Cowan Ministry on 16 February 2001, following the defeat of the Liberal-National coalition government at the 2001 election six days earlier. The Ministry was reconstituted on 10 March 2005 following the February 2005 election. It was succeeded by the Carpenter Ministry on 3 February 2006 due to the retirement of Geoff Gallop from politics on 25 January.

== First Ministry ==
The Governor, Ken Michael, designated 14 principal executive offices of the Government under section 43(2) of the Constitution Acts Amendment Act 1899. The following ministers and parliamentary secretaries were then appointed to the positions, and served until the reconstitution of the Ministry on 10 March 2005. The list below is ordered by decreasing seniority within the Cabinet, as indicated by the Government Gazette and the Hansard index.

Office	Minister
Premier; Minister for Public Sector Management; Minister for Federal Affairs; Minister for Science; Minister for Citizenship and Multicultural Interests	Geoff Gallop, BEc, MA, MPhil, D.Phil. (Oxon), MLA
Deputy Premier; Treasurer; Minister for Energy	Eric Ripper, BA, Dip.Ed., MLA
Minister for Agriculture and Food; Minister for Forestry and Fisheries; Minister for the Mid West; Minister for the Wheatbelt; Minister for the Great Southern; Leader of the Government in the Legislative Council	Kim Chance, MLC^{[4]}
Minister for Housing (until 2 July 2001); Minister for Works and Services (until 2 July 2001); Minister for Housing and Works (2 July 2001 – 27 June 2003)^{[3]} Minister for Local Government and Regional Development (from 2 July 2001); Minister for Heritage (from 27 June 2003); Minister for the Kimberley; Minister for the Pilbara; Minister for the Gascoyne; Minister for Goldfields-Esperance	Tom Stephens, BA, MLC (until 16 September 2004)^{[4]}
(until 2 July 2001:) Minister for Labour Relations Minister for Consumer Affairs Minister for Employment and Training Minister for Training (2 July 2001 – 14 January 2003); Minister for Consumer and Employment Protection (from 2 July 2001); Minister for Indigenous Affairs (from 27 June 2003); Leader of the House in the Legislative Assembly; Minister assisting the Minister for Public Sector Management (from 27 June 2003)	John Kobelke, BSc, Dip.Ed., JP, MLA
Attorney-General; Minister for Health (from 27 June 2003); Minister for Electoral Affairs (until 27 June 2003:) Minister for Justice and Legal Affairs Minister for Peel and the South West	Jim McGinty, BA, BJuris (Hons), LL.B., JP, MLA^{[3]}
Minister for the Environment and Heritage (until 27 June 2003); Minister for the Environment (from 27 June 2003); Minister for Water Resources (until 2 July 2001)	Judy Edwards, MBBS, MLA
Minister for Police; Minister for Emergency Services; Minister for Local Government (until 2 July 2001); Minister assisting the Minister for Planning and Infrastructure (9 March 2001 – 1 July 2002)^{[1]} Minister for Justice (from 27 June 2003)^{[3]} Minister for Community Safety (from 27 June 2003)	Michelle Roberts, BA, Dip.Ed., MLA^{[3]}
Minister for Planning and Infrastructure^{[1]}	Alannah MacTiernan, BA, LL.B., BJuris, JP, MLA
Minister for State Development; Minister for Tourism (9 March 2001 – 27 June 2003); Minister for Small Business (until 27 June 2003); Minister for Goldfields-Esperance (until 2 July 2001)	Clive Brown, MLA
Minister for Education (until 14 January 2003); Minister for Education and Training (from 14 January 2003); Minister for Sport and Recreation (until 27 June 2003); Minister for Indigenous Affairs (until 27 June 2003)	Alan Carpenter, BA, MLA
Minister for Community Development; Minister for Women's Interests (from 9 March 2001); Minister for Seniors and Youth (from 9 March 2001); Minister for Disability Services; Minister for Culture and the Arts	Sheila McHale, BA, Dip.Soc.Sci., JP, MLA
Minister for Health (until 27 June 2003) (from 27 June 2003:) Minister for Tourism Minister for Small Business Minister for Sport and Recreation Minister for Peel and the South West	Bob Kucera, APM, MLA^{[3]}
Minister for Housing and Works (from 27 June 2003)^{[3]} Minister for Racing and Gaming; Minister for Government Enterprises (from 2 July 2001); Minister for Land Information (from 27 June 2003); Minister for Goldfields-Esperance (2 July 2001 – 27 June 2003); Minister assisting the Treasurer (until 2 July 2001)	Nick Griffiths, LL.B., MLC
Minister for Local Government and Regional Development; Minister for Heritage; Minister for the Kimberley; Minister for the Pilbara; Minister for the Gascoyne; Minister for Goldfields-Esperance	Ljiljanna Ravlich, BA (SocSc), Dip.Ed., MLC (from 21 September 2004)^{[4]}
Parliamentary Secretaries^{[2]}	Mark McGowan, BA, LL.B., Dip LP, MLA; Fran Logan, BA (Hons), MLA; Norm Marlborough, MLA; Graham Giffard, BA, MIR, MLC; Ken Travers, MLC; Ljiljanna Ravlich, BA (SocSc), Dip.Ed., MLC (until 21 September 2004)^{[4]} Sue Ellery, MLC (from 21 September 2004); Mick Murray, MLA (from 21 September 2004)

^{1} On 3 March 2001, Minister for Planning and Infrastructure Alannah MacTiernan, whose portfolio included road safety, lost her licence after being booked for driving at 98 km/h in a 60 km/h zone near Pinjarra. On 9 March 2001, Premier Gallop appointed Minister for Police Michelle Roberts as Minister assisting the Minister for Planning and Infrastructure with respect to Road Safety, meaning that Roberts would chair the Ministerial Council on Road Safety and be responsible for three Acts of Parliament.
^{2} The parliamentary secretaries were not appointed at the same time as the rest of the Ministry. A separate announcement was made on 23 March 2001 confirming their appointments.
^{3} On 27 June 2003, a Cabinet reshuffle removed Health from Bob Kucera and Housing and Works from Tom Stephens, reallocating the portfolios to Jim McGinty and Nick Griffiths respectively. The membership of the Cabinet remained unchanged.
^{4} On 16 September 2004, Tom Stephens MLC resigned from the Ministry and from Parliament in order to contest the seat of Kalgoorlie at the October 2004 federal election. Kim Chance adopted the portfolios before they were reassigned to Ljiljanna Ravlich, who was promoted from parliamentary secretary to Minister on 21 September 2004.

== Second Ministry ==
Following the state election on 26 February 2005, the Ministry was reconstituted on 10 March—the only personnel change resulted from the retirement from politics of Clive Brown.

The Governor, Ken Michael, designated 17 principal executive offices of the Government under section 43(2) of the Constitution Acts Amendment Act 1899. The following ministers and parliamentary secretaries were then appointed to the positions, and served until the reconstitution of the Ministry on 10 March 2005. The list below is ordered by decreasing seniority within the Cabinet, as indicated by the Government Gazette and the Hansard index.

Office	Minister
Premier; Minister for Public Sector Management; Minister for Water Resources; Minister for Federal Affairs	Geoff Gallop, BEc, MA, MPhil, D.Phil. (Oxon), MLA
Deputy Premier; Treasurer; Minister for Government Enterprises; Minister assisting the Minister for Public Sector Management	Eric Ripper, BA, Dip.Ed., MLA
Minister for Agriculture and Forestry; Minister for the Mid West; Minister for the Wheatbelt; Leader of the Government in the Legislative Council	Kim Chance, MLC
Minister for Education and Training	Ljiljanna Ravlich, BA (SocSc), Dip.Ed., MLC
Minister for Consumer and Employment Protection; Minister for Indigenous Affairs; Minister assisting the Minister for Water Resources; Leader of the House in the Legislative Assembly	John Kobelke, BSc, Dip.Ed., JP, MLA
Attorney-General; Minister for Health; Minister for Electoral Affairs	Jim McGinty, BA, BJuris (Hons), LL.B., JP, MLA
Minister for the Environment; Minister for Science	Judy Edwards, MBBS, MLA
Minister for Police; Minister for Emergency Services; Minister for Community Safety	Michelle Roberts, BA, Dip.Ed., MLA
Minister for Planning and Infrastructure	Alannah MacTiernan, BA, LL.B., BJuris, JP, MLA
Minister for State Development; Minister for Energy	Alan Carpenter, BA, MLA
Minister for Community Development; Minister for Culture and the Arts; Minister for Women's Interests	Sheila McHale, BA, Dip.Soc.Sci., JP, MLA
Minister for Disability Services; Minister for Sport and Recreation; Minister for Citizenship and Multicultural Interests; Minister for Seniors	Bob Kucera, APM, MLA (until 13 October 2005)^{[1]}
Minister for Tourism; Minister for Racing and Gaming; Minister for Youth; Minister for Peel and the South West (13 October–25 November 2005:)^{[1]} Minister for Disability Services Minister for Sport and Recreation Minister for Citizenship and Multicultural Interests Minister for Seniors	Mark McGowan, BA, LL.B., Dip LP, MLA
Minister for Housing and Works; Minister for Heritage; Minister assisting the Minister for Planning and Infrastructure	Fran Logan, BA (Hons), MLA
Minister for Local Government and Regional Development; Minister for Land Information; Minister for Sport and Recreation; Minister for Goldfields-Esperance; Minister for the Great Southern	John Bowler, MLA
Minister for Justice; Minister for Small Business	John D'Orazio, BSc, MPS, MLA
Minister for Fisheries; Minister for the Kimberley; Minister for the Pilbara; Minister for the Gascoyne	Jon Ford, JP, MLC
Minister for Disability Services; Minister for Citizenship and Multicultural Interests; Minister for Seniors and Volunteering; Minister assisting the Minister for Federal Affairs	Margaret Quirk, MA, LL.B. (Hons), MLA (from 25 November 2005)^{[1]}
Parliamentary Secretaries (Appointed 26 April 2005)	Margaret Quirk, MA, LL.B. (Hons), MLA (until 25 November 2005); Adele Farina, MLC; Peter Watson, MLC; Kate Doust, MLC; Norm Marlborough, MLA; Tony McRae, MLA (from 24 May 2005)

^{1} On 13 October 2005, Bob Kucera resigned from the ministry. His portfolios were assumed by Mark McGowan until 25 November 2005, when they were split between incoming minister Margaret Quirk and John Bowler.

== Notes ==
Preceded by Court–Cowan Ministry	Gallop Ministry; 2001–2006	Succeeded by Carpenter Ministry
