= Simon O'Brien (politician) =

Australian politician

Member of the Legislative Council of Western Australia
- In office 22 May 1997 – 21 May 2021
- Constituency: South Metropolitan

Personal details
- Born: 16 May 1960 (age 66) Subiaco, Western Australia
- Party: Liberal

Simon McDonnell O'Brien (born 16 May 1960) is an Australian politician who was a Liberal Party member of the Legislative Council of Western Australia from 1997 to 2021, representing South Metropolitan Region. He served as a minister in the government of Colin Barnett from 2008 to 2013.

O'Brien was born in Perth, to Dulcie Niola (née Shooter) and Everard McDonnell O'Brien. His father, who died when his son was eleven, was a Labor Party member of parliament in the 1950s. O'Brien attended St. Louis School, John XXIII College and John Curtin Senior High School. After leaving school, he twice began officer training with the Australian Army, but had to withdraw because of injury. He worked for a period as an orderly at Fremantle Hospital, and then as a customs officer. O'Brien first attempted to enter parliament at the 1989 state election, when he unsuccessfully contested the Legislative Assembly seat of Cockburn (losing to Labor's Bill Thomas).

At the 1996 state election, O'Brien was elected to the Legislative Council, having replaced the retiring Clive Griffiths on the Liberal ticket. His term commenced in May 1997, and he has since been re-elected at the 2001, 2005, 2008 and 2013 elections. O'Brien was promoted to the Liberal shadow ministry following the party's defeat at the 2001 election, after which Colin Barnett succeeded Richard Court as party leader. He remained in the shadow ministry under three more leaders, Matt Birney, Paul Omodei and Troy Buswell, and when Barnett returned as leader in 2008. After the Liberals' victory at the 2008 election, he became Minister for Transport and Minister for Disability Services in the new Barnett ministry. The ministry was reshuffled in 2010, after which O'Brien was instead appointed Minister for Finance, Minister for Commerce and Minister for Small Business. He was not retained in the ministry after the 2013 election, but was instead made deputy chairman of committees in the Legislative Council (a position which he had earlier held from 2001 to 2008).

Parliament of Western Australia
Political offices
New creation	Minister for Transport; 2008–2010	Succeeded by Troy Buswell
Preceded by Sheila McHale	Minister for Disability Services; 2008–2010	Succeeded by Helen Morton
New creation	Minister for Finance; 2010–2013	Succeeded by Mike Nahan
Preceded by Bill Marmion	Minister for Commerce; 2010–2013	Succeeded by Michael Mischin
New creation	Minister for Small Business; 2010–2013	Succeeded by Liza Harvey
