= John D'Orazio =

Australian politician (1955–2011)

The Honourable John D'Orazio MLA

Minister for Justice
- In office 10 March 2005 – 8 May 2006
- Premier: Geoff Gallop; Alan Carpenter
- Preceded by: Michelle Roberts
- Succeeded by: Margaret Quirk

Minister for Police and Emergency Services
- In office 3 February 2006 – 8 May 2006
- Premier: Alan Carpenter
- Preceded by: Michelle Roberts
- Succeeded by: John Kobelke

Minister for Community Safety
- In office 3 February 2006 – 8 May 2006
- Premier: Alan Carpenter
- Preceded by: Michelle Roberts
- Succeeded by: John Kobelke

Minister for Small Business
- In office 10 March 2005 – 3 February 2006
- Premier: Geoff Gallop
- Preceded by: Bob Kucera
- Succeeded by: Norm Marlborough

Member of the Western Australian Legislative Assembly for Ballajura
- In office 10 February 2001 – 6 September 2008
- Preceded by: Rhonda Parker
- Succeeded by: Constituency abolished

Personal details
- Born: 5 September 1955 Mount Lawley, Western Australia
- Died: 11 April 2011 (aged 55) Murdoch, Western Australia
- Resting place: Karrakatta Cemetery
- Party: Labor Party (1995–2006, 2008); Independent (2006–2008, 2008–)
- Children: 4
- Education: Western Australian Institute of Technology
- Occupation: Pharmacist

John Biase D'Orazio (5 September 1955 – 11 April 2011) was an Australian politician who served as the member for Ballajura in the Western Australian Legislative Assembly from 10 February 2001 to 6 September 2008. He was a minister in the governments of Geoff Gallop and Alan Carpenter, and a member of the Labor Party until 29 August 2006, when he resigned following several controversies. Born to Italian immigrants, D'Orazio grew up on a market garden in the Perth suburb of Bayswater. He studied pharmacy at the Western Australian Institute of Technology, later opening his own pharmacy business. In 1981, he was elected to the City of Bayswater council, and in 1984, he became the mayor of Bayswater, in which position he served until 2001.

At the 2001 Western Australian state election, D'Orazio was elected to the seat of Ballajura, beating the Liberal incumbent Rhonda Parker. Following the 2005 state election, he was promoted to cabinet by Premier Geoff Gallop, becoming the minister for justice and minister for small business. In February 2006, after Alan Carpenter became premier, D'Orazio was appointed as the minister for police and emergency services, minister for justice, and minister for community safety.

In February 2006, it was revealed that in 2003, D'Orazio had organised a meeting between Adam Spagnolo, a City of Bayswater employee, and Tony Drago, the owner of a carpet business, where they allegedly reached a deal where Spagnolo would use his position at the City of Bayswater to give carpet contracts to the business. The Crime and Corruption Commission cleared D'Orazio of wrongdoing the following month, and all charges against Spagnolo were dropped in 2007. In March 2006, it was revealed that up to 15 staff at his pharmacy were not paid superannuation. In April, he crashed his ministerial car. His licence was suspended at the time after failing to pay for speeding fines. This caused him to be stripped of his existing ministries on 8 May 2006 and be made the minister for disability services, minister for citizenship and multicultural interests, and minister for seniors and volunteering. A day later, he resigned from cabinet. His licence was later reinstated as the speeding fines were sent to the wrong address. In August, it was revealed he had talked to corrupt panel beater Pasquale Minniti who said he could help D'Orazio get his licence back by using his connections at Western Australia Police. This forced him to resign from the Labor Party and sit as an independent.

As an independent MP, D'Orazio worked with Liberal backbencher Matt Birney to create a private member's bill for a referendum on whether to introduce daylight saving time. The bill passed, and so a three-year trial of daylight saving time commenced, with a daylight saving referendum occurring at the end of that. After the CCC found in December 2007 that D'Orazio had not engaged in misconduct when meeting with Minniti, the Labor Party was forced to let D'Orazio join again. He failed in his bid for preselection for the seat of Morley, so he resigned from the party on 26 June 2008 to stand as an independent. His decision to direct his preferences to Liberal candidate Ian Britza was credited as the reason for Britza winning Morley. D'Orazio went back to running a pharmacy after leaving parliament. He died on 11 April 2011 during an operation on his heart following a diagnosis of amyloidosis.

== Early life and career ==
D'Orazio was born on 5 September 1955 in Mount Lawley, a suburb of Perth, Western Australia. His parents were Iterno Giuseppe D’Orazio and Larentina Carione, who had immigrated from the Italian region of Abruzzo in 1949 and 1951 respectively. D'Orazio grew up at the family's market garden in Bayswater, another suburb of Perth, and attended Christian Brothers College in Bedford and Highgate, where he was a classmate of Stephen Smith. From 1973 to 1976, he studied at the Western Australian Institute of Technology (now known as Curtin University) and obtained a bachelor of science degree, majoring in pharmacy. Whilst studying there, he played cricket and captained the university's Gaelic football team. He was awarded Sportsman of the Year there in 1978. From 1976 to his election to parliament in 2001, he operated a pharmacy.

== Local government ==
D'Orazio became interested in local government whilst trying to challenge planning precedents that applied to his pharmacy. In May 1981, he was elected to the west ward of the Shire of Bayswater council. In May 1983, he became the deputy shire president, and in May 1984 he became the mayor of the City of Bayswater, succeeding C. C. Cardaci. (Note: The City of Bayswater was known as the Shire of Bayswater up until 29 October 1983. As a shire, it was governed by a shire council, headed by the shire president and deputy shire president. As a city, it is governed by a mayor and deputy mayor)

Under D'Orazio as mayor, the City of Bayswater restructured its administration; the Morley Galleria Shopping Centre was constructed; it became the first local government in the state to become debt free; it introduced co-mingled recycling and a green waste bin, regarded as one of the best waste systems in Australia at the time; it introduced security patrols; and the first wave pool in the state, Bayswater Waves, was constructed. In September 2000, the Bayswater Community Bank, Perth's first Bendigo Bank community branch, was launched following the closure of all other banks in the Bayswater town centre. D'Orazio was chair of the bank's steering committee.

D'Orazio originated the phrase "the Garden City" used as the city's tagline. On 9 March 1988, D'Orazio was honoured with the naming of the John D'Orazio Park on the corner of Garratt Road and Guildford Road. In December 1995, D'Orazio was made an Honorary Freeman of the City in recognition of his service for 17 consecutive years as councillor. The award is the highest honour that a local government can give in Western Australia. D'Orazio was the second person to receive that award from the City of Bayswater and the sixth to date.

During his time in local government, D'Orazio was also a planning commissioner for eight years, including as deputy chairman and chairman of the Western Australian Planning Commission.

D'Orazio resigned as mayor in 2001 when he won his seat in the Western Australian Legislative Assembly. He was succeeded by Lou Magro.

== Parliament ==
D'Orazio joined the Labor Party in 1995. At the 1996 Western Australian state election, he contested the newly created seat of Ballajura for the Labor Party, but he was defeated by 44 votes by the Liberal Party's Rhonda Parker, making Ballajura the closest seat for that election. He attempted to gain preselection for Ballajura again for the 2001 state election, but found himself at the centre of a controversial preselection process. D'Orazio, who had gained the backing of Labor leader Geoff Gallop and the federal member for Perth, Stephen Smith, went up against lawyer Darryl Wookey, who was backed by controversial former premier Brian Burke. The Labor Left faction supported D'Orazio, whereas the Centre and Right factions were split between the two candidates. Wookey eventually withdrew, leaving D'Orazio as the sole candidate for preselection. The 2001 state election resulted in D'Orazio's election to the seat of Ballajura. D'Orazio was one of a few first-term MPs considered for a cabinet position, but he was overlooked.

From May 2001 to January 2005, D'Orazio was the chairman of the Public Accounts Committee. In 2004, D'Orazio was accused of branch stacking, with six people signed up as members of his branches saying they are not members of the Labor Party and do not want to be members. Labor Party State Secretary Bill Johnston investigated the accusations and D'Orazio proclaimed his innocence, saying that those accusing him were aligned with Brian Burke. Preselections were put on hold during the investigation.

At the 2005 state election, D'Orazio achieved a swing of 8.7 percent towards him, the largest swing in the state for that election. Following that election, on 10 March 2005, Gallop changed his mind on an earlier decision to disallow D'Orazio from joining cabinet until a Crime and Corruption Commission (CCC) investigation into the Bayswater council had been completed. D'Orazio was appointed minister for justice and minister for small business by Premier Geoff Gallop. He also acted as attorney-general whilst Jim McGinty was unable to be in the role.

On 24 March 2005, D'Orazio announced an enquiry into the state's prison system. He also appointed a new head of the state's prison service. In April, former New South Wales Supreme Court Justice Dennis Mahoney was chosen to head the enquiry. The report from the enquiry was handed down on 23 November 2005. It recommended significant reform of the management of Indigenous prisoners to reduce the over-representation of Indigenous people in prison. D'Orazio announced a A$7 million upgrade to security at Karnet Prison Farm and Wooroloo Prison Farm following several escapes. This was later revised to $10 million, and involved the construction of fences around the prison farms. He later announced a $9.6 million expansion for Bunbury Regional Prison, adding a new 70-bed unit.

Following the resignation of Gallop, Alan Carpenter became Premier. D'Orazio was appointed minister for police and emergency services and minister for community safety. He resigned as minister for small business, and continued as minister for justice. Carpenter declared D'Orazio a "rising star", a statement which soon became a faux pas.

=== Controversies ===
On 25 August 2003, Adam Spagnolo, a City of Stirling councillor and former mayor, City of Bayswater building maintenance officer, and D'Orazio's campaign manager for the 2001 election, and Tony Drago, the owner of a carpet company, held a meeting. They allegedly reached a deal where Spagnolo's son had a 50 percent stake in Drago's carpet business and Spagnolo would use his position at the City of Bayswater to give carpet contracts to the business. This came out during an investigation into the City of Bayswater in 2005 by the CCC. On 22 February 2006, The West Australian ran a story on its front page alleging that the meeting took place in D'Orazio's electorate office and that he was the person who brokered the deal. The story referred to D'Orazio as "the Godfather", which he criticised as an ethnic slur. D'Orazio confirmed that he organised the meeting but said he knew nothing of the business relationship between the two and that he was only acting as a mediator. The CCC began an investigation into D'Orazio's involvement in the meeting. D'Orazio threatened legal action against The West Australian if it failed to print a front-page apology, but neither the apology nor the legal action occurred. The CCC cleared D'Orazio of any wrongdoing on 3 March 2006. All charges against Spagnolo were dropped in October 2007 because "there was no reasonable prospect of a conviction because an innocent explanation could not be ruled out."

In March 2006, it was revealed that up to 15 staff at D'Orazio's pharmacy had not been paid superannuation over two to three years. Staff at the pharmacy said D'Orazio became aware of the problem before May 2005 when an employee complained to the Australian Taxation Office (ATO), but D'Orazio said he became aware of the problem in November 2005 when selling the pharmacy. Unions WA secretary Dave Robinson said that it was unthinkable for D'Orazio to be unaware of the situation. The ATO gave him a directive to pay all outstanding superannuation plus interest and penalties. Pressure was put on Premier Alan Carpenter by unions to sack D'Orazio, but Carpenter continued to stand behind D'Orazio. The Police Union also backed D'Orazio.

In August and October 2005, D'Orazio was fined for speeding. On 21 April 2006, D'Orazio crashed his ministerial car. He then found out that his licence had been suspended since 22 February after failing to pay the speeding fines. He was given on-the-spot fines, but reminder notices were sent to his previous address despite him having updated his licence details several years before. Days before this became known to the public, he increased penalties for speeding, using a mobile phone whilst driving, and not wearing a seatbelt. He refused to resign from cabinet, so on 8 May 2006, Carpenter reassigned his ministries. D'Orazio was dropped as minister for police and emergency services, minister for community safety, and minister for justice, and he was instead appointed minister for disability services, minister for citizenship and multicultural interests, and minister for seniors and volunteering. The following day, after criticism from the public, D'Orazio was forced to resign from all his ministries and he became a backbencher. Police declined to charge D'Orazio for driving without a licence. Eventually, the suspension was cancelled.

During 2006, the CCC began an investigation into Bayswater panel beater Pasquale Minniti, who was alleged to have used his connections with Western Australia Police to get speeding tickets withdrawn for those associated with him. During a CCC hearing in August 2006, six phone calls between D'Orazio and Minniti were played. In the first one, the day that D'Orazio left the position of police minister, Minniti offered D'Orazio help to avoid having his licence suspended. Later that day, Minniti called a friend at the police infringement management operations section, saying "we need to fix things up for John D'Orazio". The friend refused to help with D'Orazio, saying he was "unfixable". D'Orazio was seen on CCTV footage meeting at Minniti's workplace two days later. D'Orazio later told Minniti not to get involved. On 25 August, the day after the CCC hearing played those phone calls, D'Orazio resigned from the Labor Party at the request of Alan Carpenter. Days later, D'Orazio said that the request for his resignation was unfair. In November 2008, Minniti was sentenced to 18 months in jail.

=== Daylight saving bill ===
In October 2006, D'Orazio indicated his intention to introduce a private member's bill for Western Australia to hold a referendum on whether the state should introduce daylight saving time. Daylight saving time has had three previous referendums, in 1992, 1984 and 1975, each time ending resulting in a majority against daylight saving time. D'Orazio said in an interview:

There's an overwhelming support for the proposition. What's important here is that the parties don't lock themselves into a position, and me moving this as an independent, there's an opportunity here for both political parties to allow their members to have a free vote.

D'Orazio introduced his bill on 24 October 2006. A new bill, designed by D'Orazio alongside Liberal Party backbencher Matt Birney was introduced to parliament by Birney on 25 October. Both major parties allowed a conscience vote, and the bill passed the Legislative Assembly on 31 October. The bill passed the Legislative Council on 21 November, and received royal assent on 24 November. The final act passed resulted in a three-year trial of daylight savings, after which, a referendum was held to determine whether to have daylight saving time for every summer. D'Orazio received harassment and death threats from daylight saving opponents.

=== Rejoining the Labor Party and the 2008 election ===
In December 2007, the CCC found that D'Orazio acted inappropriately but did not engage in misconduct when meeting with Minniti. The report criticised D'Orazio's failure to discourage Minniti's assistance, but said that none of it constituted an offence. D'Orazio rejoined the Labor Party in April 2008 after the party decided it was better to let him join than have a costly legal battle. This was against the wishes of Premier Carpenter, who days later said that he did not trust D'Orazio not to leak information from caucus. During his fight to re-enter the Labor Party, branch stacking allegations resurfaced, with Education and Training Minister Mark McGowan controversially calling D'Orazio "the worst ethnic branch stacker in the history of Labor in Western Australia".

Ahead of the 2008 Western Australian state election, the electoral district of Ballajura was abolished and the electoral district of Morley was created, covering much of the same area. Premier Alan Carpenter disallowed D'Orazio from contesting the seat as a Labor candidate, hand-picking Reece Whitby instead, so on 26 June 2008, D'Orazio left the party and chose to stand as an independent candidate. D'Orazio decided to direct the preferences on his how-to-vote cards towards the Liberal candidate, Ian Britza, instead of Whitby. At the election on 6 September 2008, D'Orazio received 16.0 percent of the first-preference votes, Whitby received 35.7 percent, and Britza received 34.7 percent. The two-candidate-preferred vote was 50.9 percent for Britza, giving the Liberal Party the seat of Morley in what was one of their most surprising seat victories. Two-thirds of voters for D'Orazio followed his how-to-vote cards, despite most of them having typically voted for Labor in the past. Morley had the largest swing against Labor of any Labor-held electorate. The Labor Party won 28 seats at that election and the Liberal Party won 24, both falling short of the 30 seats needed for a majority, resulting in a hung parliament. The Liberal Party were able to gain the support of the four National Party MPs and three independent MPs, allowing the party to form government. Britza said that it would have been unlikely for him to win the seat without D'Orazio's preferences.

== Personal life and death ==
D'Orazio was Catholic. He married twice. From his first marriage he had one son and one daughter, and from his second marriage, to Ailsa McCulloch on 19 January 2003, he had one son and one daughter.

Following his exit from parliament, D'Orazio opened a pharmacy in Alexander Heights.

In 2011, D'Orazio was diagnosed with amyloidosis, a rare blood disease in which excessive proteins attack organs; a condition for which he had chemotherapy. During an operation to install a mini defibrillator in his heart at St John of God Murdoch Hospital on 11 April 2011, his heart failed, resulting in his unexpected death.

== See also ==
- Electoral results for the district of Ballajura
- Electoral results for the district of Morley
- Gallop ministry
- Carpenter ministry

== Notes ==
Civic offices
Preceded by C. C. Cardaci	Mayor of Bayswater; 1984–2001	Succeeded by Lou Magro
Western Australian Legislative Assembly
Preceded by Rhonda Parker	Member for Ballajura; 10 February 2001 – 6 September 2008	Abolished
Political offices
Preceded by Michelle Roberts	Minister for Justice; 10 March 2005 – 8 May 2006	Succeeded by Margaret Quirk
Preceded by Bob Kucera	Minister for Small Business; 10 March 2005 – 3 February 2006	Succeeded by Norm Marlborough
Preceded by Michelle Roberts	Minister for Police and Emergency Services; 3 February 2006 – 8 May 2006	Succeeded by John Kobelke
Preceded by Michelle Roberts	Minister for Community Safety; 3 February 2006 – 8 May 2006	Succeeded by John Kobelke
Preceded by Margaret Quirk	Minister for Disability Services; 8 May 2006 – 9 May 2006	Succeeded by Margaret Quirk
Preceded by Margaret Quirk	Minister for Citizenship and Multicultural Interests; 8 May 2006 – 9 May 2006	Succeeded by Margaret Quirk
Preceded by David Templeman	Minister for Seniors and Volunteering; 8 May 2006 – 9 May 2006	Succeeded by David Templeman
