= Minister for Disability Services (Western Australia) =

Minister for Disability Services is a position in the government of Western Australia, currently held by Hannah Beazley of the Labor Party. The position was first created in 1991, for the government of Carmen Lawrence, and has existed in every government since then. The minister is responsible for the state government's Disability Services Commission.

== Titles ==
- 20 August 1991 – present: Minister for Disability Services

== List of ministers ==
Term start	Term end	Minister	Party
20 August 1991	16 February 1993	Eric Ripper	Labor
16 February 1993	9 January 1997	Kevin Minson	Liberal
9 January 1997	16 February 2001	Paul Omodei	Liberal
16 February 2001	10 March 2005	Sheila McHale	Labor
10 March 2005	13 October 2005	Bob Kucera	Labor
13 October 2005	25 November 2005	Mark McGowan	Labor
25 November 2005	8 May 2006	Margaret Quirk	Labor
8 May 2006	9 May 2006	John D'Orazio	Labor
9 May 2006	26 May 2006	Margaret Quirk (again)	Labor
26 May 2006	26 February 2007	Tony McRae	Labor
26 February 2007	2 March 2007	Mark McGowan (again)	Labor
2 March 2007	23 September 2008	Sheila McHale (again)	Labor
23 September 2008	14 December 2010	Simon O'Brien	Liberal
14 December 2010	31 March 2016	Helen Morton	Liberal
31 March 2016	17 March 2017	Donna Faragher	Liberal
17 March 2017	18 March 2021	Stephen Dawson	Labor
18 March 2021	19 March 2025	Don Punch	Labor
19 March 2025		Hannah Beazley	Labor

== See also ==
- Minister for Community Services (Western Australia)
- Minister for Health (Western Australia)
- Minister for Mental Health (Western Australia)
