= Minister for Small Business =

Minister for Small Business may refer to:

- Minister for Small Business (Australia)
  - Minister for Small Business (New South Wales)
  - Minister for Small Business (Victoria)
  - Minister for Small Business (Western Australia)
