= 1993 Western Australian state election =

- 6 February 1993

All 57 seats in the Western Australian Legislative Assembly and all 34 seats in the Western Australian Legislative Council 29 Assembly seats were needed for a majority
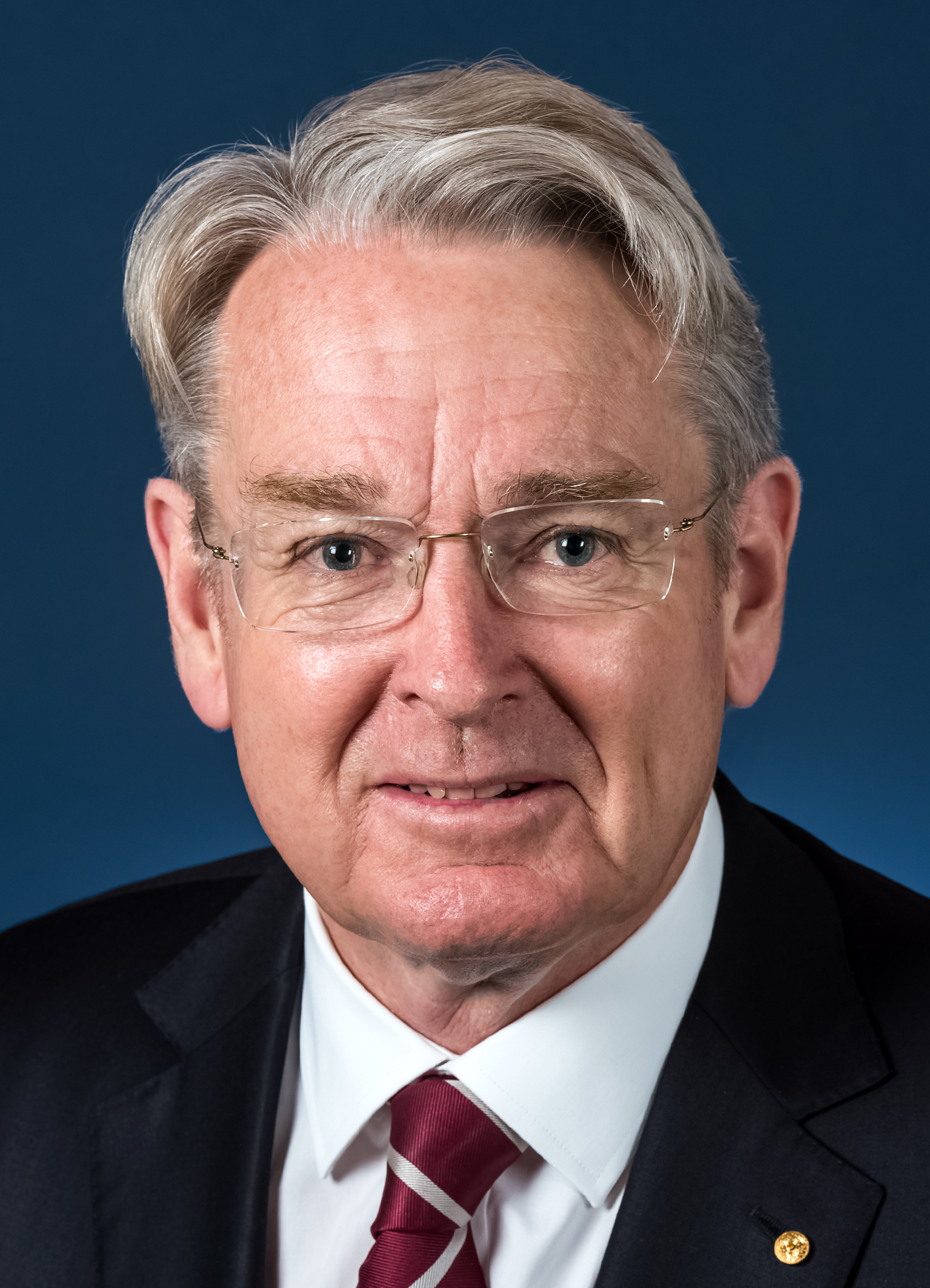

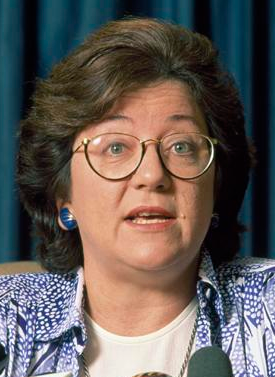
	First party	Second party
Leader	Richard Court	Carmen Lawrence
Party	Liberal/National coalition	Labor
Leader since	12 May 1992	12 February 1990
Leader's seat	Nedlands	Glendalough
Last election	26 seats	31 seats
Seats won	32	24
Seat change	▲6	▼7
Popular vote	450,796	338,008
Percentage	44.86%	37.08%
Swing	▲2.07	▼5.38
TPP	55.45%	44.55%
TPP swing	▲3.07	▼3.07
Premier before election
Carmen Lawrence
Labor
Elected Premier
Richard Court
Liberal/National coalition

Elections were held in the state of Western Australia on 6 February 1993 to elect all 57 members to the Legislative Assembly and all 34 members to the Legislative Council. The three-term Labor government, led by Premier Carmen Lawrence since 12 February 1990, was defeated by the Liberal–National coalition, led by Opposition Leader Richard Court since 12 May 1992.

== Results ==
=== Legislative Assembly ===
Western Australian state election, 6 February 1993 Legislative Assembly << 1989–1996 >>
Enrolled voters	1,016,750				
Votes cast	950,698		Turnout	93.50%	+2.77%
Informal votes	39,220		Informal	4.13%	–3.22%
Summary of votes by party
Party	Primary votes	%	Swing	Seats	Change
Liberal	402,402	44.15%	+1.36%	26	+ 6
Labor	338,008	37.08%	–5.38%	24	– 7
National	48,394	5.31%	+0.71%	6	± 0
Greens	39,300	4.31%	+3.78%	0	± 0
Democrats	21,147	2.32%	+0.89%	0	± 0
Other parties	2,662	0.29%	–4.90%	0	± 0
Independent^{[1]}	59,182	6.49%	+3.59%	1	+ 1
Total	911,478			57	
Two-party-preferred
Liberal/National	505,391	55.45%	+3.07%		
Labor	406,087	44.55%	–3.07%		

Notes:

^{1} Andrew Mensaros, the former Liberal member for Floreat, resigned from parliament on 16 May 1991 due to ill health. Dr Liz Constable, who had Mensaros's support, ran as an Independent against the endorsed Liberal candidate in the resulting by-election on 20 July 1991, and won.

=== Legislative Council ===
Western Australian state election, 6 February 1993 Legislative Council
Enrolled voters	1,016,750				
Votes cast	952,426		Turnout	93.67%	+2.94%
Informal votes	35,643		Informal	3.74%	–3.61%
Summary of votes by party
Party	Primary votes	%	Swing	Seats	Change
Liberal	418,039	45.60%	+4.45%	15	± 0
Labor	337,554	36.82%	–4.49%	14	– 2
National	36,614	3.99%	–1.01%	3	± 0
Greens	47,305	5.16%	+1.97%	1	+ 1
Democrats	27,640	3.01%	–0.31%	0	± 0
Grey Power	5,937	0.64%	–3.38%	0	± 0
Other parties	5,390	0.58%	–0.29%	0	± 0
Independent	38,304	4.18%	+2.96%	1	± 1
Total	916,783			34	

== Seats changing parties ==
Seat	Pre-1993			Swing	Post-1993		
Seat	Party	Member	Margin	Swing	Margin	Member	Party
Bunbury	Labor	Phil Smith	1.5	3.1	1.6	Ian Osborne	Liberal
Darling Range	Independent	Ian Thompson	N/A	N/A	N/A	John Day	Liberal
Dianella	Labor	Keith Wilson	1.1	2.5	1.4	Kim Hames	Liberal
Morley	Independent	Frank Donovan	N/A	N/A	N/A	Clive Brown	Labor
Murray	Labor	Keith Read	0.9	2.2	1.3	Arthur Marshall	Liberal
Perth	Independent	Ian Alexander	N/A	N/A	N/A	Diana Warnock	Labor
Swan Hills	Labor	Gavan Troy	1.5	6.1	4.6	June van de Klashorst	Liberal
Wanneroo	Labor	Jackie Watkins	1.6	2.9	1.3	Wayde Smith	Liberal
Whitford	Labor	Pam Beggs	1.7	7.8	6.1	Rob Johnson	Liberal

Members listed in italics did not contest their seat at this election.

== Post-election pendulum ==
Liberal/National seats (32)
Marginal
Murray	Arthur Marshall	LIB	1.3%
Wanneroo	Wayde Smith	LIB	1.3%
Dianella	Kim Hames	LIB	1.4%
Bunbury	Ian Osborne	LIB	1.6%
Roleystone	Fred Tubby	LIB	4.0%
Swan Hills	June van de Klashorst	LIB	4.6%
Collie	Hilda Turnbull	NAT	5.5%
Moore	Bill McNee	LIB	5.8% v NAT
Fairly safe
Whitford	Rob Johnson	LIB	6.1%
Scarborough	George Strickland	LIB	6.2%
Mandurah	Roger Nicholls	LIB	8.6%
Geraldton	Bob Bloffwitch	LIB	9.6%
Safe
Albany	Kevin Prince	LIB	10.0%
Melville	Doug Shave	LIB	10.3%
Riverton	Graham Kierath	LIB	10.5%
Kingsley	Cheryl Edwardes	LIB	12.8%
South Perth	Phillip Pendal	LIB	13.2% v IND
Merredin	Hendy Cowan	NAT	15.6% v LIB
Jandakot	Mike Board	LIB	15.9%
Avon	Max Trenorden	NAT	16.0%
Wellington	John Bradshaw	LIB	17.2%
Darling Range	John Day	LIB	18.3%
Roe	Ross Ainsworth	NAT	18.6% v LIB
Warren	Paul Omodei	LIB	19.9%
Marmion	Jim Clarko	LIB	20.4%
Nedlands	Richard Court	LIB	20.7%
Cottesloe	Colin Barnett	LIB	21.2%
Vasse	Barry Blaikie	LIB	21.2%
Applecross	Richard Lewis	LIB	21.3%
Greenough	Kevin Minson	LIB	22.9%
Stirling	Monty House	NAT	25.3% v LIB
Wagin	Bob Wiese	NAT	27.7% v LIB

Labor seats (24)
Marginal
Helena	Gordon Hill	ALP	0.2%
Perth	Diana Warnock	ALP	0.3%
Northern Rivers	Kevin Leahy	ALP	1.8%
Glendalough	Carmen Lawrence	ALP	2.7%
Mitchell	David Smith	ALP	2.9%
Kenwick	Judyth Watson	ALP	4.0%
Balcatta	Nick Catania	ALP	4.4%
Nollamara	John Kobelke	ALP	4.7%
Belmont	Eric Ripper	ALP	4.8%
Victoria Park	Geoff Gallop	ALP	5.0%
Armadale	Kay Hallahan	ALP	5.3%
Rockingham	Mike Barnett	ALP	5.5%
Thornlie	Yvonne Henderson	ALP	5.7%
Fairly safe
Fremantle	Jim McGinty	ALP	6.4%
Maylands	Judy Edwards	ALP	7.6%
Morley	Clive Brown	ALP	7.6%
Kalgoorlie	Ian Taylor	ALP	7.7%
Ashburton	Fred Riebeling	ALP	8.1%
Eyre	Julian Grill	ALP	8.5%
Safe
Peel	Norm Marlborough	ALP	10.7%
Marangaroo	Ted Cunningham	ALP	12.3%
Cockburn	Bill Thomas	ALP	14.0%
Kimberley	Ernie Bridge	ALP	15.4%
Pilbara	Larry Graham	ALP	16.9%
Crossbench seats (1)
Floreat	Liz Constable	IND	12.8% v LIB

== See also ==
- Candidates of the 1993 Western Australian state election
- Members of the Western Australian Legislative Assembly, 1989–1993
- Members of the Western Australian Legislative Assembly, 1993–1996
