= 1996 Western Australian state election =

Australian state election

- 14 December 1996

All 57 seats in the Legislative Assembly All 34 seats in the Legislative Council 29 Assembly seats were needed for a majority
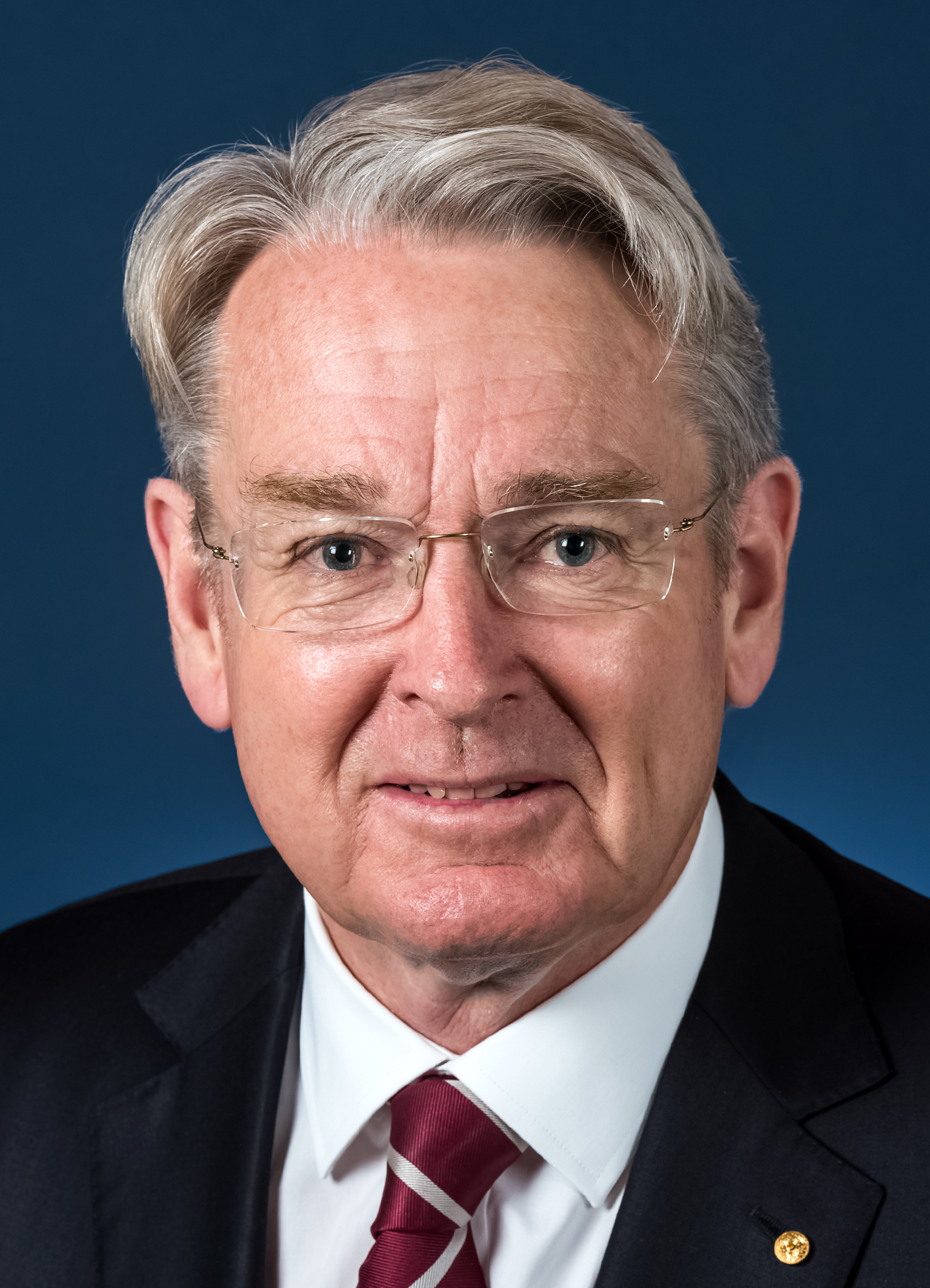

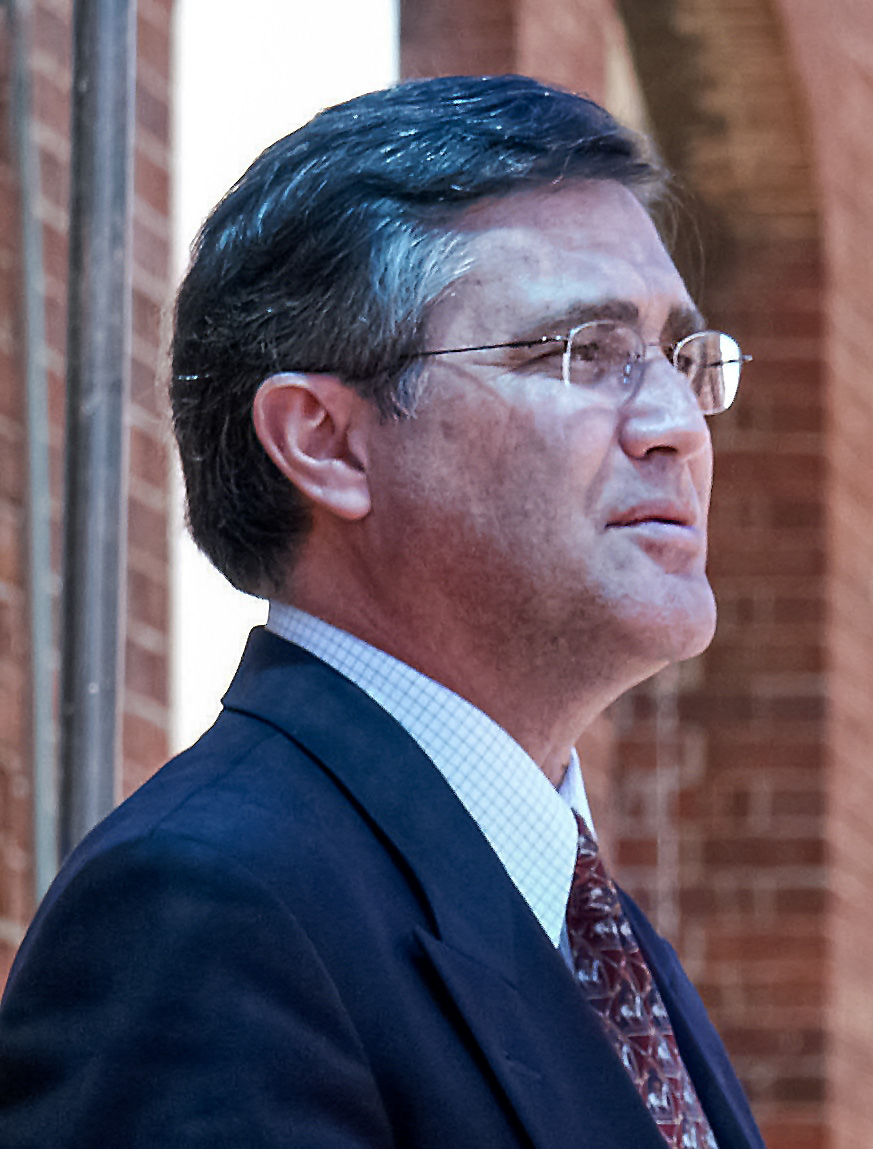
	First party	Second party
Leader	Richard Court	Geoff Gallop
Party	Liberal/National coalition	Labor
Leader since	12 May 1992	15 October 1996
Leader's seat	Nedlands	Victoria Park
Last election	32 seats	24 seats
Seats won	35 seats	19 seats
Seat change	▲3	▼5
Popular vote	440,335	345,159
Percentage	45.69%	35.82%
Swing	▼3.79	▼1.26
TPP	55.16%	44.84%
TPP swing	▼0.28	▲0.28
Premier before election
Richard Court
Liberal/National coalition
Elected Premier
Richard Court
Liberal/National coalition

Elections were held in the state of Western Australia on 14 December 1996 to elect all 57 members to the Legislative Assembly and all 34 members to the Legislative Council. The Liberal–National coalition government, led by Premier Richard Court, won a second term in office against the Labor Party, led by Opposition Leader Geoff Gallop since 15 October 1996.

The election resulted in the Liberals winning an outright majority for the first time in Western Australia's history. Although Court did not need the support of the Nationals, the coalition was retained. Meanwhile, Labor attracted its lowest share of the primary vote since 1901.

== Results ==
=== Legislative Assembly ===
Western Australian state election, 14 December 1996 Legislative Assembly << 1993–2001 >>
Enrolled voters	1,119,992				
Votes cast	1,007,835		Turnout	89.99%	–3.51%
Informal votes	44,229		Informal	4.39%	+0.26%
Summary of votes by party
Party	Primary votes	%	Swing	Seats	Change
Liberal	384,518	39.90%	–4.25%	29	+ 3
Labor	345,159	35.82%	–1.26%	19	– 5
National	55,817	5.79%	+0.46%	6	± 0
Democrats	48,985	5.08%	+2.76%	0	± 0
Greens	45,550	4.73%	+0.42%	0	± 0
Marijuana	3,245	0.34%	+0.34%	0	± 0
Other parties	6,929	0.72%	–4.35%	0	± 0
Independent^{[1]}	74,179	7.70%	+1.21%	3	+ 2
Total	963,606			57	
Two-party-preferred
Liberal/National	530,603	55.16%	–0.28%		
Labor	431,245	44.84%	+0.28%		

Notes:

^{1} At the 1993 election, Liberal Party member Phillip Pendal won the South Perth seat, whilst Labor Party member Ernie Bridge won Kimberley. Both members resigned from their parties during the term of parliament, and won their seats as independents in 1996.

=== Legislative Council ===
Western Australian state election, 14 December 1996 Legislative Council
Enrolled voters	1,119,992				
Votes cast	1,009,592		Turnout	90.14%	–3.53%
Informal votes	30,430		Informal	3.01%	–0.73%
Summary of votes by party
Party	Primary votes	%	Swing	Seats	Change
Liberal (metropolitan)	313,953	32.06%	–2.59%	7	– 1
Liberal/National^{[1]}	140,933	14.39%	–0.24%		
Liberal (country)				7	± 0
National				3	± 0
Labor	323,886	33.08%	–3.74%	12	– 2
Democrats	64,461	6.58%	+3.57%	2	+ 2
Greens	54,336	5.55%	+0.39%	3	+ 2
Marijuana	24,373	2.49%	+2.49%	0	± 0
Call to Australia	6,675	0.68%	+0.41%	0	± 0
Australia First Party	5,856	0.60%	+0.60%	0	± 0
Natural Law Party	5,514	0.56%	+0.56%	0	± 0
Racism No!	1,939	0.20%	+0.20%	0	± 0
Independent	37,236	3.80%	–0.38%	0	– 1
Total	979,162			34	

^{1} In the Agricultural and South West regions, the Liberals and Nationals ran a joint ticket, and in Mining and Pastoral, they ran separately, with the Liberals attracting 18,635 of the 52,240 formal votes and the Nationals 5,087.

== Seats changing hands ==
Seat	Pre-1996			Swing	Post-1996		
Seat	Party	Member	Margin	Swing	Margin	Member	Party
Kimberley	Labor	Ernie Bridge	15.4	N/A	11.5	Ernie Bridge	Independent
Mitchell	Labor	David Smith	0.5	+3.7	3.2	Dan Sullivan	Liberal
Ningaloo	Labor	Kevin Leahy	1.2	+1.9	0.7	Rod Sweetman	Liberal
South Perth	Liberal	Phillip Pendal	13.2	N/A	14.2	Phillip Pendal	Independent
Southern River	Labor	Judyth Watson	2.6	+4.1	1.5	Monica Holmes	Liberal

== Post-election pendulum ==
Liberal/National seats (35)
Marginal
Ballajura	Rhonda Parker	LIB	0.1%
Ningaloo	Rod Sweetman	LIB	0.7%
Southern River	Monica Holmes	LIB	1.5%
Wanneroo	Iain MacLean	LIB	1.6%
Carine	Katie Hodson-Thomas	LIB	2.2% v IND
Alfred Cove	Doug Shave	LIB	2.4% v IND
Mandurah	Roger Nicholls	LIB	3.0%
Yokine	Kim Hames	LIB	3.2%
Mitchell	Dan Sullivan	LIB	3.2%
Innaloo	George Strickland	LIB	4.0%
Bunbury	Ian Osborne	LIB	5.3%
Joondalup	Chris Baker	LIB	5.5%
Fairly safe
Riverton	Graham Kierath	LIB	6.7%
Geraldton	Bob Bloffwitch	LIB	7.0%
Roleystone	Fred Tubby	LIB	7.2%
Vasse	Bernie Masters	LIB	9.2% v NAT
Collie	Hilda Turnbull	NAT	9.3%
Swan Hills	June van de Klashorst	LIB	9.7%
Hillarys	Rob Johnson	LIB	9.9%
Dawesville	Arthur Marshall	LIB	9.9%
Safe
Kingsley	Cheryl Edwardes	LIB	10.2%
Albany	Kevin Prince	LIB	11.9%
Roe	Ross Ainsworth	NAT	12.0% v IND
Murray-Wellington	John Bradshaw	LIB	12.0%
Darling Range	John Day	LIB	12.9%
Nedlands	Richard Court	LIB	14.9%
Murdoch	Mike Board	LIB	15.1%
Avon	Max Trenorden	NAT	16.8%
Warren-Blackwood	Paul Omodei	LIB	17.1%
Cottesloe	Colin Barnett	LIB	19.8%
Greenough	Kevin Minson	LIB	22.1%
Stirling	Monty House	NAT	24.1%
Moore	Bill McNee	LIB	27.9%
Wagin	Bob Wiese	NAT	28.7%
Merredin	Hendy Cowan	NAT	31.2%

Labor seats (19)
Marginal
Thornlie	Sheila McHale	ALP	1.5%
Burrup	Fred Riebeling	ALP	1.7%
Armadale	Alannah MacTiernan	ALP	4.0%
Midland	Michelle Roberts	ALP	4.3%
Kalgoorlie	Megan Anwyl	ALP	4.4%
Fairly safe
Maylands	Judy Edwards	ALP	7.1%
Belmont	Eric Ripper	ALP	7.5%
Rockingham	Mark McGowan	ALP	7.5%
Victoria Park	Geoff Gallop	ALP	7.8%
Perth	Diana Warnock	ALP	7.9%
Willagee	Alan Carpenter	ALP	8.8%
Nollamara	John Kobelke	ALP	8.9%
Safe
Cockburn	Bill Thomas	ALP	10.6%
Eyre	Julian Grill	ALP	11.0%
Peel	Norm Marlborough	ALP	11.2% v IND
Fremantle	Jim McGinty	ALP	11.3%
Bassendean	Clive Brown	ALP	12.0%
Girrawheen	Ted Cunningham	ALP	12.6%
Pilbara	Larry Graham	ALP	15.7%
Crossbench seats (3)
Kimberley	Ernie Bridge	IND	11.5% v LIB
South Perth	Phillip Pendal	IND	14.2% v LIB
Churchlands	Liz Constable	IND	33.2% v ALP

== See also ==
- Candidates of the 1996 Western Australian state election
- Members of the Western Australian Legislative Assembly, 1993–1996
- Members of the Western Australian Legislative Assembly, 1996–2001
- McGinty v Western Australia
