= Electoral district of Helena =

Former electoral district in Western Australia

Helena Western Australia—Legislative Assembly
- State: Western Australia
- Dates current: 1983–1996
- Namesake: Helena River

Helena was an electoral district of the Legislative Assembly in the Australian state of Western Australia from 1983 to 1996.

Based in the outer eastern suburbs of Perth, the district was first contested at the 1983 state election. It was won by Labor candidate Gordon Hill, who was at the time member for the abolished Swan.

Hill resigned the seat in 1994, triggering a by-election that resulted in Labor losing the seat to Liberal candidate Rhonda Parker. The ALP's loss of the seat was a key factor that saw the end of Ian Taylor's short stint as ALP leader.

Helena was abolished ahead of the 1996 state election. The bulk of its territory became part of the new seat of Midland, with another slice becoming part of the new seat of Ballajura. Parker successfully transferred to Ballajura.

== Members for Helena ==
Member	Party	Term
Gordon Hill	Labor	1983–1994
Rhonda Parker	Liberal	1994–1996
