= Minister for Small Business (Western Australia) =

Minister for Small Business is a position in the government of Western Australia, currently held by Jackie Jarvis of the Labor Party. The position was first created in 1984, for the government of Brian Burke, and has existed in most governments since then. The minister is responsible for the state government's Small Business Development Corporation.

== Titles ==
- 20 December 1984 – present: Minister for Small Business

== List of ministers ==
Term start	Term end	Minister	Party
20 December 1984	12 May 1986	Mal Bryce	Labor
12 May 1986	25 February 1988	Gavan Troy	Labor
25 February 1988	28 February 1989	Ernie Bridge	Labor
1989–1990: no minister – responsibilities held by the Minister for Economic Development and Trade
19 February 1990	20 December 1990	Jeff Carr	Labor
1990–1992: no minister – responsibilities held by other ministers
7 September 1992	16 February 1993	Gordon Hill	Labor
1993–1995: no minister – responsibilities held by the Minister for Commerce and Trade
10 February 1995	16 February 2001	Hendy Cowan	National
16 February 2001	27 June 2003	Clive Brown	Labor
27 June 2003	10 March 2005	Bob Kucera	Labor
10 March 2005	3 February 2006	John D'Orazio	Labor
3 February 2006	9 November 2006	Norm Marlborough	Labor
9 November 2006	23 September 2008	Margaret Quirk	Labor
2008–2010: no minister – responsibilities held by the Minister for Commerce
14 December 2010	21 March 2013	Simon O'Brien	Liberal
21 March 2013	5 August 2013	Liza Harvey	Liberal
5 August 2013	31 March 2016	Joe Francis	Liberal
31 March 2016	17 March 2017	Sean L'Estrange	Liberal
17 March 2017	19 March 2021	Paul Papalia	Labor
19 March 2021	21 December 2021	Reece Whitby	Labor
21 December 2021	14 December 2022	Don Punch	Labor
14 December 2022	incumbent	Jackie Jarvis	Labor

== See also ==
- Minister for Commerce (Western Australia)
- Minister for Finance (Western Australia)
- Treasurer of Western Australia
