= Clive Brown =

Australian politician

The Honourable Clive Brown MLA

Minister for State Development
- In office 16 February 2001 – 26 February 2005
- Preceded by: Colin Barnett (Resources Development)
- Succeeded by: Alan Carpenter

Minister for Tourism
- In office 6 March 2001 – 27 March 2003
- Preceded by: Norman Moore
- Succeeded by: Bob Kucera

Minister for Small Business
- In office 16 February 2001 – 27 March 2003
- Preceded by: Hendy Cowan
- Succeeded by: Bob Kucera

Minister for Goldfields-Esperance
- In office 16 February 2001 – 2 July 2001
- Preceded by: Office established
- Succeeded by: Nick Griffiths

Member of the Western Australian Legislative Assembly for Bassendean
- In office 14 December 1996 – 26 February 2005
- Preceded by: Seat created
- Succeeded by: Martin Whitely

Member of the Western Australian Legislative Assembly for Morley
- In office 6 February 1993 – 14 December 1996
- Preceded by: Frank Donovan
- Succeeded by: Seat abolished Ian Britza (2008)

Personal details
- Born: Clive Morris Brown; 31 December 1946 (age 79) Surrey, England, United Kingdom
- Citizenship: Australian
- Party: Labor
- Children: 2
- Education: Scarborough Senior High School
- Profession: Union official

Clive Morris Brown (born 31 December 1946) is an Australian former politician and minister in the Gallop Government. Brown was a member of the Western Australian Legislative Assembly between 1993 and 2005 for the electorates of Bassendean and previously a member for the Morley from 1993 until its abolition in 1996.

== Biography ==
Brown was born in 1946 in London, England. He arrived in Western Australia as a child in 1956.

Before entering politics, Brown worked in the trade union movement.

== Political career ==
He was elected to the electorate of Bassendean in the Western Australian Legislative Assembly at the 1993 Western Australian election. Between 1994 and 2001 Brown served in a number of roles in the Labor shadow cabinet.

After Labor's win at the 2001 Western Australian election, Brown joined Premier Geoff Gallop's cabinet, becoming Minister for State Development. He held this role until his retirement before the 2005 Western Australian election. In announcing his intention to retire in 2004, he cited a desire to enter business.
