= Ian Britza =

Australian politician

Member of the Western Australian Legislative Assembly for Morley
- In office 6 September 2008 – 11 March 2017
- Preceded by: Seat recreated
- Succeeded by: Amber-Jade Sanderson

Personal details
- Born: 7 May 1954 (age 72) Como, Western Australia
- Party: Liberal Party; Australian Country Party; Independent

Ian Maxwell Britza (born 7 May 1954) is an Australian politician. He was a Liberal Party member of the Western Australian Legislative Assembly from 2008 to 2017, representing Morley. He won the seat, despite its notional Labor margin, partly due to the preference flow from Independent candidate John D'Orazio.

During the 2008–09 holiday season and again in 2011–12 Britza travelled to Texas on Parliamentary Accredited Finance to provide him with an "in-depth knowledge and understanding of policy matters" and a detailed report was given to Parliament as is required. He was accused of using public funds to pay for his wife and children to go to Texas to spend time with their mother and grandmother, but he used personal finances to do this.

Britza is a Christian, and was deemed one of "God's squad" in WA Parliament for his eagerness to mention his religion publicly.

In October 2017 Britza announced his intention to contest the 2017 by-election in the federal seat of New England, New South Wales. He sat the election as an Australian Country Party candidate, and had a primary vote of 0.56%, which was 14th out of 17 candidates.

Britza contested the 2018 Perth by-election as an independent candidate, coming eighth (out of 15 candidates), with 2.95% of the vote.

Western Australian Legislative Assembly
New seat	Member for Morley; 2008–2017	Succeeded by Amber-Jade Sanderson
