= Bob Kucera =

Australian politician (born 1944)

The Honourable Bob Kucera AM APM

Member of the Legislative Assembly of Western Australia
- In office 10 February 2001 – 6 September 2008
- Preceded by: Kim Hames
- Succeeded by: None (abolished)
- Constituency: Yokine

Personal details
- Born: 6 November 1944 (age 82) Cardiff, Wales
- Party: Labor
- Other political affiliations: Independent (2008)

Robert Charles Kucera AM APM (born 6 November 1944) is a former Australian politician who was a member of the Legislative Assembly of Western Australia from 2001 to 2008, representing the seat of Yokine. A high-ranking police officer before entering parliament, he served as a minister in the government of Geoff Gallop from 2001 to 2005, but resigned over a conflict of interest. Kucera represented the Labor Party for most of his career, but lost preselection prior to the 2008 state election, and resigned to sit as an independent for the final months of his term.

== Early life ==
Kucera was born in Cardiff, Wales, to Norah Gertrude (née Williams) and Karel "Charlie" Kucera. His mother was Welsh, while his father was a member of the Czechoslovak Air Force, and the two met while stationed at Pembroke Dock during World War II. Kucera's father returned to Wales after the war, and during his childhood the family lived for periods in Cardiff (including in Llanishen and Cathays) and in the small village of Mamhilad. The family emigrated to Australia in 1964, settling in Perth.

Kucera joined Western Australia Police in 1966, and remained with the force until 2001, when he resigned to run for parliament. He was awarded a Churchill Fellowship to study policing overseas in 1991, and from 1999 to 2001 served as assistant commissioner to Barry Matthews.

== Honours and recognition ==
Kucera has been awarded the Australian Police Medal, the National Police Service Medal, the National Medal, and the Western Australia Police Medal. He was appointed a Member of the Order of Australia in the 2026 King's Birthday Honours in recognition of his "significant service to the community of Western Australia through a range of organisations".

== Politics ==
At the 2001 state election, Kucera was recruited by the Labor Party's leader, Geoff Gallop, to stand for the party in the seat of Yokine. He defeated the sitting Liberal member, Kim Hames, who had been a minister in the government of Richard Court. Immediately after being election, Kucera was made Minister for Health in Gallop's new ministry. He served in the position until a reshuffle in June 2003, after which he was instead made Minister for Tourism, Minister for Small Business, Minister for Sport and Recreation, and Minister for Peel and the South-West. After the 2005 state election, another reshuffle occurred, with Kucera's titles becoming Minister for Disability Services, Minister for Sport and Recreation, Minister for Citizenship and Multicultural Interests, and Minister for Seniors. In October 2005, Kucera resigned from the ministry after claims of a conflict of interest. He and his wife both held shares in Alinta, an energy supply company, when cabinet made a $90 million decision that would benefit the company.

Prior to the 2008 state election, Kucera's seat, Yokine, was abolished in an electoral redistribution, and was largely split between the new districts of Mount Lawley and Nollamara. He contested Labor preselection for the seat of Mount Lawley, but lost to journalist and lobbyist Karen Brown, a supporter of Alan Carpenter (who had replaced Geoff Gallop as premier in January 2006). As a result, he resigned from the Labor Party to sit as an independent. He considered running as an independent at the election, but later announced his retirement from politics, expressing a desire to spend more time with his family. Kucera eventually rejoined the Labor Party, and in February 2012 was invited by the party's new leader, Mark McGowan, to again contest preselection in Mount Lawley. He was successful, but at the 2013 state election was easily defeated by the sitting Liberal member, Michael Sutherland.

== See also ==
- Gallop Ministry

Parliament of Western Australia
Preceded by Kim Hames	Member for Yokine; 2001–2008	Abolished
Political offices
Preceded by John Day	Minister for Health; 2001–2003	Succeeded by Jim McGinty
Preceded by Clive Brown	Minister for Tourism; 2003–2005	Succeeded by Mark McGowan
Preceded by Clive Brown	Minister for Small Business; 2003–2005	Succeeded by Alan Carpenter
Preceded by Alan Carpenter	Minister for Sport and Recreation; 2003–2005	Succeeded by Mark McGowan
Preceded by Jim McGinty	Minister for Peel and the South-West; 2003–2005	Succeeded by Mark McGowan
Preceded by Sheila McHale	Minister for Disability Services; 2005	Succeeded by Mark McGowan
Preceded by Geoff Gallop	Minister for Citizenship and Multicultural Interests; 2005	Succeeded by Mark McGowan
Preceded by Sheila McHale	Minister for Seniors; 2005	Succeeded by Mark McGowan
