= 2005 Western Australian state election =

- 26 February 2005

All 57 seats in the Western Australian Legislative Assembly and all 34 seats in the Western Australian Legislative Council 29 Assembly seats were needed for a majority
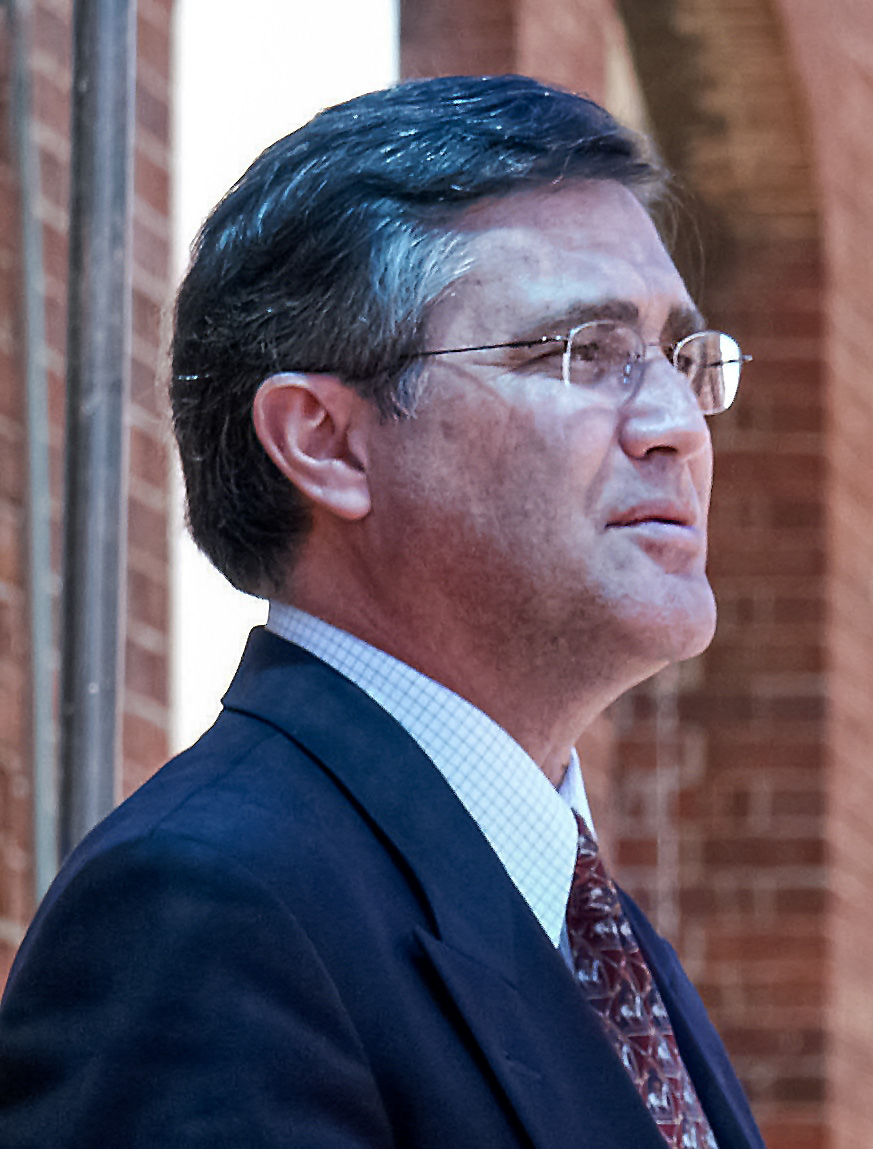

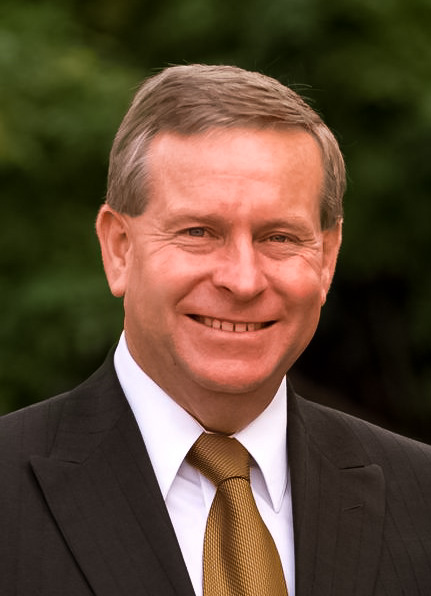

	First party	Second party	Third party
Leader	Geoff Gallop	Colin Barnett	Max Trenorden
Party	Labor	Liberal	National
Leader since	8 October 1996	26 February 2001	17 October 2001
Leader's seat	Victoria Park	Cottesloe	Avon
Last election	32 seats	16 seats	5 seats
Seats won	32	18	5
Seat change	Steady	▲2	Steady
Popular vote	448,956	382,014	39,548
Percentage	41.88%	35.64%	3.69%
Swing	▲4.65	▲4.48	▲0.43
TPP	52.28%	47.72%
TPP swing	▼0.65	▲0.65
- The map on the left shows the first party preference by electorate. The map on the right shows the final two-party preferred vote result by electorate.
Premier before election
Geoff Gallop
Labor
Elected Premier
Geoff Gallop
Labor

Elections were held in the state of Western Australia on 26 February 2005 to elect all 57 members to the Legislative Assembly and all 34 members to the Legislative Council. The Labor government, led by Premier Geoff Gallop, won a second term in office against the Liberal Party, led by Opposition Leader Colin Barnett.

== Results ==
=== Legislative Assembly ===
Winning party by electorate.

Western Australian state election, 26 February 2005 Legislative Assembly << 2001–2008 >>
Enrolled voters	1,259,262				
Votes cast	1,131,265		Turnout	89.84%	–0.72%
Informal votes	59,312		Informal	5.24%	+0.70%
Summary of votes by party
Party	Primary votes	%	Swing	Seats	Change
Labor	448,956	41.88%	▲+4.65%	32	± 0
Liberal	382,014	35.64%	▲+4.48%	18	+ 2
Greens	81,113	7.57%	▲+0.30%	0	± 0
National	39,548	3.69%	▲+0.43%	5	± 0
Christian Democrats	31,445	2.93%	▲+1.97%	0	± 0
Family First	21,701	2.02%	New	0	± 0
One Nation	17,580	1.64%	▼–7.94%	0	± 0
Other parties	4,997	0.46%	▼–0.04%	0	± 0
Independent^{[1]}	44,599	4.16%	▼–1.41%	2	– 2
Total	1,071,953			57	
Two-party-preferred
Labor	559,679	52.28%	▼–0.65%		
Liberal/National	510,937	47.72%	▲+0.65%		

Notes:

^{1} The Independent member for Pilbara, Larry Graham, and the Independent member for South Perth, Phillip Pendal, both retired at the 2005 election. The seats returned to the Labor and Liberal parties respectively.

=== Legislative Council ===
Western Australian state election, 26 February 2005 Legislative Council
Enrolled voters	1,259,262				
Votes cast	1,133,400		Turnout	90.00%	–0.70%
Informal votes	36,056		Informal	3.18%	+0.54%
Summary of votes by party
Party	Primary votes	%	Swing	Seats	Change
Labor	475,717	43.35%	▲+5.41%	16	+ 3
Liberal	407,306	37.12%	▲+3.16%	15	+ 3
National	23,985	2.19%	▼–0.21%	1	± 0
Greens	82,507	7.52%	▼–0.48%	2	– 3
Christian Democrats	25,011	2.28%	▲+0.74%	0	± 0
Family First	22,037	2.01%	New	0	± 0
One Nation	17,435	1.59%	▼–8.29%	0	– 3^{[1]}
Democrats	10,180	0.93%	▼–2.79%	0	± 0
Other parties	19,314	1.76%	▲+1.62%	0	± 0
Independent	13,852	1.26%	▼–1.18%	0	± 0
Total	1,097,344			34	

Notes:

^{1} By the time of the 2005 election, the One Nation Party actually held no seats, as the three members elected in 2001 election had resigned to sit as independents, later joining the New Country Party. None managed to retain their seats.

== Seats changing hands ==
Seat	Pre-2005			Swing	Post-2005		
Seat	Party	Member	Margin	Swing	Margin	Member	Party
Bunbury	Labor	Tony Dean	0.2	0.8	0.6	John Castrilli	Liberal
Central Kimberley-Pilbara	Independent	Larry Graham	16.2	N/A	13.8*	Tom Stephens	Labor
Greenough	Liberal	Jamie Edwards	0.9	12.6	11.7	Grant Woodhams	National
Kingsley	Liberal	Cheryl Edwardes	2.5	3.6	1.1	Judy Hughes	Labor
Murray	Labor	notional	0.7	1.2	0.5	Murray Cowper	Liberal
South Perth	Independent	Phillip Pendal	14.1	N/A	6.0*	John McGrath	Liberal
Roe	National	Ross Ainsworth	21.7	25.0	3.3	Graham Jacobs	Liberal

- Members listed in italics did not contest their seat at this election.
- *Figure is Labor vs. Liberal

== Post-election pendulum ==
Labor seats (32)
Marginal
Kingsley	Judy Hughes	ALP	0.8%
Albany	Peter Watson	ALP	1.4%
Riverton	Tony McRae	ALP	1.7%
Geraldton	Shane Hill	ALP	2.1%
Joondalup	Tony O'Gorman	ALP	3.3%
Kimberley	Carol Martin	ALP	3.3%
North West Coastal	Fred Riebeling	ALP	3.7%
Swan Hills	Jaye Radisich	ALP	3.8%
Mindarie	John Quigley	ALP	4.0%
Fairly safe
Wanneroo	Dianne Guise	ALP	6.7%
Murchison-Eyre	John Bowler	ALP	8.1%
Yokine	Bob Kucera	ALP	8.2%
Midland	Michelle Roberts	ALP	8.5%
Collie-Wellington	Mick Murray	ALP	9.3%
Balcatta	John Kobelke	ALP	9.9%
Safe
Belmont	Eric Ripper	ALP	10.8%
Southern River	Paul Andrews	ALP	11.8%
Perth	John Hyde	ALP	12.0%
Mandurah	David Templeman	ALP	12.3%
Rockingham	Mark McGowan	ALP	12.3%
Armadale	Alannah MacTiernan	ALP	13.0%
Ballajura	John D'Orazio	ALP	13.5%
Central Kimberley-Pilbara	Tom Stephens	ALP	13.6%
Kenwick	Sheila McHale	ALP	13.6%
Bassendean	Martin Whitely	ALP	13.7%
Fremantle	Jim McGinty	ALP	14.4%
Victoria Park	Geoff Gallop	ALP	16.0%
Cockburn	Fran Logan	ALP	16.4%
Willagee	Alan Carpenter	ALP	16.4%
Maylands	Judy Edwards	ALP	16.5%
Girrawheen	Margaret Quirk	ALP	23.4%

Liberal/National seats (23)
Marginal
Bunbury	John Castrilli	LIB	0.4%
Murray	Murray Cowper	LIB	0.8%
Vasse	Troy Buswell	LIB	0.9% v IND
Serpentine-Jarrahdale	Tony Simpson	LIB	1.2%
Greenough	Grant Woodhams	NAT	1.3% v LIB
Darling Range	John Day	LIB	3.1%
Dawesville	Kim Hames	LIB	4.1%
Hillarys	Rob Johnson	LIB	4.2%
Carine	Katie Hodson-Thomas	LIB	4.7%
Roe	Graham Jacobs	LIB	5.6% v NAT
South Perth	John McGrath	LIB	5.8%
Murdoch	Trevor Sprigg	LIB	5.9%
Fairly safe
Stirling	Terry Redman	NAT	7.0% v LIB
Leschenault	Dan Sullivan	LIB	7.7%
Nedlands	Sue Walker	LIB	8.4%
Capel	Steve Thomas	LIB	9.2%
Kalgoorlie	Matt Birney	LIB	9.6%
Safe
Cottesloe	Colin Barnett	LIB	11.7%
Warren-Blackwood	Paul Omodei	LIB	15.0%
Merredin	Brendon Grylls	NAT	15.5% v LIB
Moore	Gary Snook	LIB	17.3%
Avon	Max Trenorden	NAT	22.1%
Wagin	Terry Waldron	NAT	28.4%
Crossbench seats (2)
Alfred Cove	Janet Woollard	IND	4.6% v LIB
Churchlands	Liz Constable	IND	20.7% v LIB

== Opinion polling ==
Legislative Assembly (lower house) polling
Date	Firm	Primary vote
Date	Firm	ALP	LIB	NAT	ON	GRN	AD	OTH
2005 election		41.9%	35.6%	3.7%	–	7.6%	–	11.2%
23–24 February 2005	Newspoll	45%	36.5%	3%	0.5%	7%	–	8%
28–30 January 2005	Newspoll	42%	40%	4%	1%	6%	*	7%
October–December 2004	Newspoll	35%	46%	3%	*	7%	1%	8%
July–September 2004	Newspoll	38%	38%	3%	*	9%	2%	10%
April–June 2004	Newspoll	38%	39%	3%	*	7%	1%	12%
January–March 2004	Newspoll	37%	39%	3%	2%	7%	1%	11%
October–December 2003	Newspoll	35%	39%	3%	2%	7%	1%	13%
July–September 2003	Newspoll	34%	40%	2%	2%	8%	1%	13%
April–June 2003	Newspoll	39%	36%	3%	1%	9%	1%	11%
January–March 2003	Newspoll	36%	38%	4%	1%	8%	2%	11%
October–December 2002	Newspoll	35%	38%	4%	1%	10%	2%	10%
July–September 2002	Newspoll	37%	37%	3%	2%	8%	2%	11%
April–June 2002	Newspoll	39%	36%	5%	2%	6%	2%	10%
January–March 2002	Newspoll	34%	37%	4%	2%	6%	3%	14%
October–December 2001	Newspoll	35%	41%	3%	5%	9%	3%	4%
July–September 2001	Newspoll	35%	37%	5%	6%	9%	3%	5%
2001 election		37.2%	31.2%	3.2%	9.6%	7.3%	2.6%	8.9%
7–8 February 2001	Newspoll	39%	35%	3%	7%	5%	3%	8%

Better premier polling
	Labor Gallop	Liberal Barnett
23–24 February 2005	58%	27%
28–30 January 2005	52%	31%
October–December 2004	48%	26%
July–September 2004	55%	20%
April–June 2004	53%	21%
January–March 2004	47%	23%
October–December 2003	46%	23%
July–September 2003	50%	19%
April–June 2003	56%	15%
January–March 2003	54%	17%
October–December 2002	56%	12%
July–September 2002	53%	17%
April–June 2002	55%	16%
January–March 2002	47%	19%
October–December 2001	51%	20%
July–September 2001	50%	16%
Polling conducted by Newspoll. Remainder were "uncommitted" to either leader.

Satisfaction polling
	Gallop		Barnett
	Satisfied	Dissatisfied	Satisfied	Dissatisfied
23–24 February 2005	51%	38%	36%	50%
28–30 January 2005	46%	40%	38%	43%
October–December 2004	46%	38%	37%	37%
July–September 2004	52%	33%	37%	41%
April–June 2004	47%	35%	35%	42%
January–March 2004	46%	39%	39%	41%
October–December 2003	42%	40%	30%	47%
July–September 2003	45%	33%	36%	36%
April–June 2003	53%	26%	34%	37%
January–March 2003	53%	28%	34%	40%
October–December 2002	56%	24%	29%	40%
July–September 2002	55%	27%	34%	38%
April–June 2002	53%	26%	35%	39%
January–March 2002	50%	31%	38%	33%
October–December 2001	50%	34%	37%	34%
July–September 2001	51%	23%	35%	28%
Polling conducted by Newspoll. Remainder were "uncommitted" to either leader.

== See also ==
- Members of the Western Australian Legislative Assembly, 2001–2005
- Members of the Western Australian Legislative Assembly, 2005–2008
- Candidates of the 2005 Western Australian state election
