= Margaret Quirk =

Australian politician (born 1957)

Member of the Western Australian Legislative Assembly
- In office 10 February 2001 – 8 March 2025
- Preceded by: Ted Cunningham
- Succeeded by: Daniel Pastorelli
- Constituency: Girrawheen; Landsdale

Personal details
- Born: 26 June 1957 (age 69) Adelaide, South Australia, Australia
- Party: Labor
- Education: University of Adelaide; Murdoch University
- Website: www.margaretquirk.com

Margaret Mary Quirk (born 26 June 1957) is an Australian politician who was a Labor Party member of the Western Australian Legislative Assembly from 2001 to 2025. She served as a minister in the governments of Geoff Gallop and Alan Carpenter between 2005 and 2008.

== Early life ==
Quirk was born in Adelaide, South Australia, to Helen Marian Sykes and James Patrick Quirk. During her childhood, she lived for periods in Perth, Western Australia, and Oxford, England, but eventually returned to Adelaide, graduating from Unley High School. Quirk went on to study law at the University of Adelaide, graduating with a Bachelor of Laws degree in 1975. She moved to Canberra after graduation, initially working for the administrative review section of the federal government's Department of Immigration and Ethnic Affairs. She later worked in the office of the Commonwealth Director of Public Prosecutions. Quirk moved to Western Australia in 1988 to work as an adviser to the Labor government of Peter Dowding on energy and environmental issues. She was employed by a commercial law from 1989 to 1991, and then worked for the National Crime Authority until her election to parliament.

== Politics ==
Quirk entered parliament at the 2001 state election, replacing the retiring Ted Cunningham in Girrawheen, a Labor safe seat. She was made government whip shortly after her election, and made a parliamentary secretary in 2003. That year, she also graduated from Murdoch University with a Master of Arts degree in public policy. In November 2005, Quirk was elevated to the ministry, becoming Minister for Disability Services, Minister for Citizenship and Multicultural Interests, and Minister for Seniors and Volunteering. When Alan Carpenter replaced Geoff Gallop as premier in January 2006, she also became Minister for Women's Interests, but lost the seniors portfolio to David Templeman. A few months later, on 8 May 2006, Quirk replaced John D'Orazio as Minister for Justice, with D'Orazio taking over her previous portfolios (excluding women's interests). However, D'Orazio resigned from the ministry the following day, and Quirk regained her other positions for a brief period before eventually relinquishing them to Tony McRae. In the same ministerial reshuffle, the position of Minister for Justice was abolished, with Quirk instead becoming Minister for Corrective Services.

In November 2006, Quirk was appointed Minister for Small Business in place of Norm Marlborough, who had been expelled from the ministry. She relinquished the women's interests portfolio to Sue Ellery in March 2007, but remained Minister for Corrective Services and Minister for Small Business until the Labor government's defeat at the 2008 state election. Quirk was retained in the shadow ministry under the new leader of the Labor Party (and Leader of the Opposition), Eric Ripper, and continued on after Mark McGowan replaced Ripper as leader in January 2012. She retained Girrawheen at the 2013 state election, despite an unfavourable redistribution which had made it a marginal seat. Quirk has been identified as a member of the Labor Right faction.

On 2 April 2024, it was announced that Quirk would be retiring at the 2025 state election. She was succeeded by Premier Roger Cook's chief of staff, Daniel Pastorelli.

== See also ==
- Women in the Western Australian Legislative Assembly

Parliament of Western Australia
Preceded by Ted Cunningham	Member for Girrawheen; 2001–2021	District abolished
New district	Member for Landsdale; 2021–2025	Succeeded by Daniel Pastorelli
Political offices
Preceded by Mark McGowan; John D'Orazio	Minister for Disability Services; 2005–2006; 2006	Succeeded by John D'Orazio; Tony McRae
Preceded by Mark McGowan; John D'Orazio	Minister for Citizenship and Multicultural Interests; 2005–2006; 2006	Succeeded by John D'Orazio; Tony McRae
Preceded by Mark McGowan	Minister for Seniors and Volunteering; 2005–2006	Succeeded by David Templeman
Preceded by Sheila McHale	Minister for Women's Interests; 2006–2007	Succeeded by Sue Ellery
Preceded by John D'Orazio	Minister for Justice; 2006	Abolished
New creation	Minister for Corrective Services; 2006–2008	Succeeded by Christian Porter
Preceded by Norm Marlborough	Minister for Small Business; 2006–2008	Abolished
