= Electoral district of Ballajura =

Former electoral district in Perth, Western Australia

Ballajura Western Australia—Legislative Assembly
- State: Western Australia
- Dates current: 1996–2008
- Namesake: Ballajura

Ballajura was an electoral district of the Legislative Assembly in the Australian state of Western Australia from 1996 to 2005.

The district was based in the north-eastern suburbs of Perth. It was a marginal seat held by both major parties over the course of its short existence.

== Geography ==
Ballajura was a north-to-south elongated electorate squeezed between Alexander Drive and Beechboro Road. The district contained the suburbs of Ballajura, Malaga, Noranda and the lightly populated Cullacabardee. It also contained parts of the suburbs of Dianella, Morley, Noranda and Landsdale.

== History ==
Ballajura was first contested at the 1996 state election. The seat was won by Liberal candidate Rhonda Parker, previously the member for Helena, which had been abolished. Parker was defeated one term later, at the 2001 state election by Labor candidate John D'Orazio, who had been the unsuccessful Labor candidate at the previous election.

D'Orazio won a second term at the 2005 state election, but broke with the Labor Party the following year. The redistribution ahead of the 2008 state election saw Ballajura abolished and divided between the new districts of Morley and West Swan. D'Orazio unsuccessfully contested Morley as an independent.

== Members for Ballajura ==
Member	Party	Term
Rhonda Parker	Liberal	1996–2001
John D'Orazio	Labor	2001–2006
John D'Orazio	Independent	2006–2008
