= Geoff Gallop =

Australian politician (born 1951)

The Honourable Geoff Gallop AC FASSA
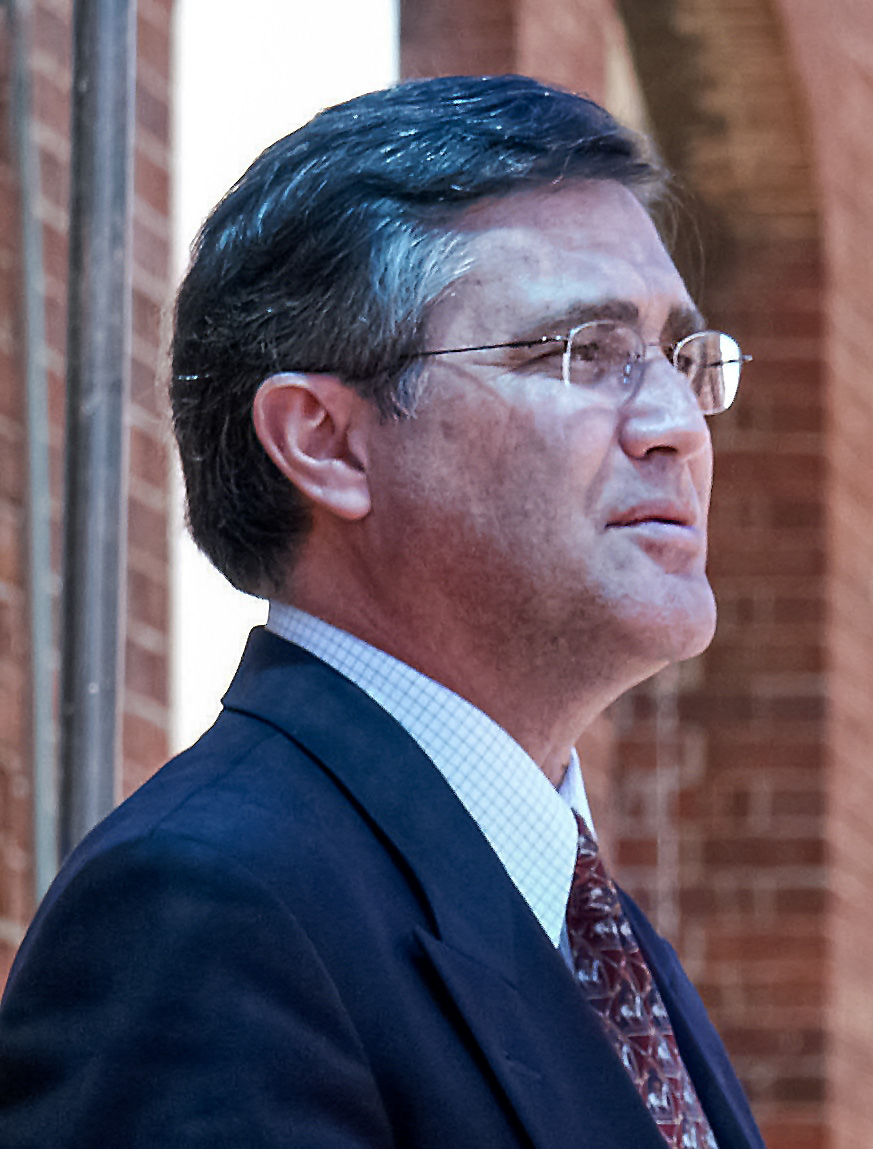
- Gallop at the Midland Railway Workshops in 2002

27th Premier of Western Australia
- In office 16 February 2001 – 25 January 2006
- Monarch: Elizabeth II
- Governor: John Sanderson
- Deputy: Eric Ripper
- Preceded by: Richard Court
- Succeeded by: Alan Carpenter

Leader of the Opposition
- In office 8 October 1996 – 16 February 2001
- Premier: Richard Court
- Deputy: Jim McGinty; Eric Ripper
- Preceded by: Jim McGinty
- Succeeded by: Richard Court

Leader of the Western Australian Labor Party
- In office 8 October 1996 – 24 January 2006
- Preceded by: Jim McGinty
- Succeeded by: Alan Carpenter

Member of the Western Australian Legislative Assembly
- In office 7 June 1986 – 25 January 2006
- Preceded by: Ron Davies
- Succeeded by: Ben Wyatt
- Constituency: Victoria Park

Personal details
- Born: Geoffrey Ian Gallop; 27 September 1951 (age 75) Geraldton, Western Australia, Australia
- Party: Labor
- Spouses: Beverley Diane Jones (m. 1975; died 2009); Ingrid van Beek (m. 2010)
- Children: 2
- Education: University of Western Australia (BEc); University of Oxford (BA, DPhil); Murdoch University (MPhil)
- Profession: Academic, politician

Geoffrey Ian Gallop (born 27 September 1951) is an Australian academic and former politician who was the premier of Western Australia from 16 February 2001 to 25 January 2006. A member of the Labor Party, he served in the Western Australian Legislative Assembly from 1986 to 2006 and was a minister in the Lawrence government from 1990 to 1993.

Born and raised in Geraldton, Gallop studied economics at the University of Western Australia before attending the University of Oxford on a Rhodes Scholarship. He completed a Master of Philosophy at Murdoch University and a Doctor of Philosophy at Oxford before working as a lecturer at Murdoch and a City of Fremantle councillor from 1983. In 1986, Gallop was elected to the Western Australian Legislative Assembly for the seat of Victoria Park. Carmen Lawrence appointed him to cabinet after his role in the 1990 leadership spill, but lost his cabinet position after Labor's defeat in the 1993 state election. Gallop became the leader of the state Labor Party close to the 1996 state election, in which he led Labor to defeat. He stayed on as leader, leading the party to victory in the 2001 state election, defeating the eight-year-old Coalition government led by Richard Court.

As premier, Gallop ended the logging of old-growth forests, started construction of the Perth–Mandurah rail line, increased the leaving age of school students from 15 to 17, introduced one vote, one value electoral reform in the Legislative Assembly, and commissioned the state's first major desalination plant at Kwinana. Generally popular throughout his time as premier, Gallop led Labor to a second victory in 2005, but in January 2006, he resigned from parliament due to depression. He was succeeded as premier and Labor leader by Alan Carpenter. Gallop has since worked as a professor at the University of Sydney, and chaired the Australian Republican Movement from 2012 to 2015.

== Early life ==
Gallop was born on 27 September 1951 in the city of Geraldton, Western Australia, to Douglas John Gallop and Eunice Grigsby. Doug was the secretary and part owner of the Geraldton Building Company. As a result, he leaned towards supporting the Liberal Party, whereas Eunice's family were Labor supporters. Gallop attended Beachlands Primary School and Geraldton Senior High School, where he was a prefect. At the University of Western Australia (UWA) in Perth, Gallop studied economics. There, he got involved with student politics. As a first-year student, Gallop joined the Liberal Club, edited the club's newsletter Libido, and started a branch of the Young Liberals at UWA's Kingswood College, where he lived. He later joined the Labor Party after Bob McMullan persuaded him, where he met Kim Beazley and he was elected president of the university's Labor branch. He graduated with a Bachelor of Economics in 1971.

In December 1971, Gallop was awarded a Rhodes Scholarship to study at the University of Oxford. At St John's College, Oxford, he became close friends with Peter Thomson and future U.K. prime minister Tony Blair. He graduated in 1974 with a Bachelor of Arts (honours) degree in philosophy, politics and economics, then completed a Master of Philosophy degree at Murdoch University in Perth, graduating in 1977. In 1975, he married his first wife, Beverley Jones. He returned to Oxford to earn a Doctor of Philosophy degree, graduating in 1983. After returning to Perth, Gallop lived in South Fremantle and worked as a lecturer at Murdoch University, teaching social and political theory.

== Early political career ==
In 1983, Gallop was elected to the City of Fremantle council. Fellow councillors at the time included Norm Marlborough and academic Peter Newman. Soon after the 1986 state election, there were two vacant seats in the Legislative Assembly (lower house): Cockburn, due to the death of Clive Hughes, and Victoria Park, due to the resignation of Ron Davies. According to Premier Brian Burke, Gallop had been recommended by Beazley, by now the federal member for Swan, to run in the Victoria Park by-election. But according to cabinet minister Bob Pearce, Gallop had wanted to stand for Cockburn and Marlborough wanted to stand for Victoria Park, but there was apprehension within the unions over an academic representing a seat like Cockburn, which borders the Kwinana industrial area, so Gallop and Marlborough swapped seats.

Upon being elected, Gallop moved from South Fremantle to Victoria Park. In 1988, Gallop was tasked with running the Labor Party's campaign for the Ascot by-election, where Eric Ripper was elected. In 1990, Gallop supported the leadership spill that led to Peter Dowding being replaced as Premier by Carmen Lawrence in February. As a result of Julian Grill's resignation from cabinet as well, there were two spots open, so Lawrence promoted Gallop to cabinet, giving him the portfolios of education, parliamentary and electoral reform. Later that year, he was given the additional role of minister assisting the treasurer, Lawrence. As the minister assisting the treasurer, Gallop said "[he] had to announce all the bad news from WA Inc".

After Labor lost the 1993 state election, Lawrence stayed on as leader for a year, until she resigned and Ian Taylor took over. After Taylor announce his "love" for Brian Burke, who was by now a highly controversial figure, in 1994, the party sought to replace him. Labor's state secretary, Mark Nolan, sought for Gallop to take over, but Gallop said his wife would need to be convinced, and she said no. Jim McGinty became leader instead, but he made little inroads against the incumbent Coalition government, led by Richard Court. By 1996, polling for the Labor Party was poor, and McGinty agreed to step down. Gallop took over as leader, with his wife now in approval. Court called an early election for December 1996. On election day, the Labor Party was defeated 55.4 percent to 44.6 percent, not as heavy a defeat as earlier polls predicted.

Following the 1996 state election, McGinty was replaced as deputy Labor leader with Ripper. In March 1999, Gallop announced his commitment to stopping the logging of old-growth forests and renewed Labor's opposition to Court's native title legislation. Significant sections of the Labor Party opposed Gallop's view on the logging of old-growth forests due to its impact on logging workers and communities. He took the policy to the Labor Party's conference in May and secured it's endorsement, after persuading Construction, Forestry, Mining and Energy Union secretary Kevin Reynolds to support it. He also secured endorsement to support a challenge against the government's native title legislation in the High Court. The finance brokers' scandal eroded support for the Coalition government. Gallop promised to reduce the number of cabinet ministers from 17 to 14, reduce the number of government departments, reduce the government's car fleet, and get rid of 60 senior public servants. Gallop's final pitch to voters ahead of the February 2001 state election was to end the logging of old-growth forests, fix the hospital crisis, and lower petrol prices. On election day, the Coalition government suffered an 8.3 percent swing on a two-party-preferred basis, making Gallop the premier of Western Australia.

== Premier ==
Gallop's cabinet was unveiled on 14 February and sworn in by the governor of Western Australia, John Sanderson, two days later. As promised, there were only 14 cabinet ministers. Gallop himself held the portfolios of public sector management, federal affairs, science, and citizenship and multicultural interests. Newly elected MP and former assistant police commissioner Bob Kucera was promoted straight to cabinet as the minister for health. The final cabinet position went to Nick Griffiths, against the wishes of Gallop, who wanted either Mark McGowan or Ljiljanna Ravlich in cabinet as they had performed well in the shadow ministry. Gallop and Ripper were outvoted after Left powerbroker McGinty and Right powerbroker Michelle Roberts supported Griffiths. Soon after cabinet was sworn in, the minister for planning and infrastructure, Alannah MacTiernan, had her driver's licence suspended for drink driving. Gallop transferred the road safety component of her portfolio to Roberts. In September 2004, after Tom Stephens resigned from parliament to run for the federal seat of Kalgoorlie, Ravlich was promoted to cabinet.

=== Achievements ===
The Gallop government established two royal commissions: one into the finance brokers' scandal, and another on the police force. It passed legislation in 2003 to establish the Crime and Corruption Commission. The logging of old-growth forests was ended in 2001 and a proposed resort and marina at Mauds Landing near Coral Bay, next to the Ningaloo Reef, was blocked on environmental grounds in 2003. Due to climate change, rainfall into Perth's dam catchments had decreased significantly since the 1980s, so Gallop committed to building the state's first major desalination plant at Kwinana for $346 million and the Emu Downs Wind Farm to offset the power required for the plant. The plant commenced operating in 2006. He closed the Swan Valley Nyungah Community.

The early years of the Gallop government were in a poor financial situation. Gallop had inadvertently promised at an election campaign television debate not to increase taxes or charges, when he had meant to say that the increases would be kept below inflation. He was forced by the poor financial situation to break that promise. He had considered introducing a premium property tax on houses valued over $1 million like had been done in New South Wales, but abandoned that plan after it polled poorly. Later on, the financial problems eased, and a budget surplus was achieved, which prompted calls from the opposition for stamp duty relief.

During her time in shadow cabinet, MacTiernan had been working with Professor Peter Newman on planning to reroute the proposed Perth–Mandurah railway line from the circuitous route proposed by the Coalition government, to a more direct route via the Kwinana Freeway and Narrows Bridge. The new route was 12 minutes faster and more expense to construct. In July 2001, cabinet officially approved the new route. Construction started in February 2004.

In the period between the February 2005 state election and the swearing in of the newly elected Legislative Council (upper house) members in May 2005, the Gallop government passed legislation implementing one vote, one value in the Legislative Assembly (lower house), giving each electoral district in the lower house the same number of electors, removing a pro-rural malapportionment that favoured conservative parties. As Labor did not have a majority in the upper house, the legislation was passed with the support of the Greens and Alan Cadby, who had left the Liberal Party in 2004 after being disendorsed.

=== 2005 state election ===
Opposition Leader Colin Barnett promised to cancel the desalination plant if he won the upcoming state election, and build the $2 billion Kimberley–Perth Canal, which would carry water to Perth from the Fitzroy River in the state's north instead. Labor attacked this proposal due to its high cost.

Concurrently with the state election, the retail trading hours referendum was held and defeated.

In March 2005, cabinet was reshuffled. It was expanded from 14 to 17 members, with five new ministers. Gallop accepted a proposal from the Left and New Right factions for Fran Logan, John D'Orazio and Jon Ford to be given cabinet positions, and handpicked the unaligned MPs Mark McGowan and John Bowler to round out cabinet. The Old Right faction, led by former premier Brian Burke, lost out on having Norm Marlborough promoted to cabinet, as Gallop believed him to be too closely aligned with Burke. Gallop had earlier placed a ban on all ministers communicating with Burke and his lobbying partner Julian Grill. Marlborough was later promoted to cabinet by Gallop's successor, Alan Carpenter, but demoted after a CCC investigation revealed that he had been receiving instructions from Burke on certain decisions. Later that year, Kucera was forced to resign from cabinet after it was revealed his wife owned shares in Alinta, which cabinet was making decisions over. He was replaced by Margaret Quirk in November.

=== Resignation ===
On 16 January 2006, Gallop announced his resignation as the premier of Western Australia. Ripper acted as premier until the Labor Party could elect a new leader. After other contenders withdrew, Alan Carpenter was elected leader of the Labor Party unopposed on 24 January and sworn in the following day, on which Gallop ceased to be premier and a member of parliament. Gallop later revealed that he had been suffering from depression since childhood, but had only been diagnosed recently.

== Post-political career ==
In July 2006, Gallop became a professor and director at the University of Sydney's Graduate School of Government.

In the 2008 Queen's Birthday Honours, Gallop was made a companion of the Order of Australia for "distinguished service to the Parliament of Western Australia, to the promotion of economic development and environmental sustainability, and to the community through educational, health and social reform."

In November 2012, Gallop was elected the chair of the Australian Republican Movement (ARM), serving in the position until July 2015.

== Personal life ==
Gallop married his first wife, Beverley Diane Jones, on 1 March 1975 in Maylands. They have two sons. She died of lung cancer on 4 March 2009 after a long illness. He met his second wife, Sydney doctor Ingrid van Beek, on a Qantas flight to Jakarta about a month later. They got married at Vaucluse House in Sydney on 4 April 2010.

== See also ==
- Electoral results for the district of Victoria Park

Western Australian Legislative Assembly
| Preceded by Ron Davies | Member for Victoria Park; 7 June 1986 – 25 January 2006 | Succeeded by Ben Wyatt |
Political offices
| Preceded by Jim McGinty | Leader of the Opposition; 8 October 1996 – 16 February 2001 | Succeeded by Colin Barnett |
| Preceded by Richard Court | Premier of Western Australia; 16 February 2001 – 25 January 2006 | Succeeded by Alan Carpenter |
Party political offices
| Preceded by Jim McGinty | Leader of the Western Australian Labor Party; 8 October 1996 – 24 January 2006 | Succeeded by Alan Carpenter |
