= Rhonda Parker =

Australian politician (born 1954)

Rhonda Kathleen Parker, née Davey (born 7 September 1954) is a former Australian politician.

She was born in Warragul in Victoria and arrived in Western Australia in 1967. Before entering politics she was a lecturer and a partner in a small business. She was elected to the Western Australian Legislative Assembly in 1994 in a by-election for the seat of Helena, representing the Liberal Party; she moved to Ballajura in 1996. She was a parliamentary secretary from 1995 to 1997, first to the Minister for Education and then to the Minister for Tourism, before winning a promotion herself as Minister for Family and Children's Services, Seniors and Women's Interests in 1997. She stepped down from the front bench in 1999 and was defeated in 2001.

Western Australian Legislative Assembly
Preceded by Gordon Hill	Member for Helena; 1994–1996	Abolished
New seat	Member for Ballajura; 1996–2001	Succeeded by John D'Orazio
