= John Bradshaw (Australian politician) =

Australian politician

John Leslie Bradshaw (born 15 December 1942) is a former Australian politician.

He was born in Perth and was a self-employed pharmacist before entering politics. In 1983 he was elected to the Western Australian Legislative Assembly as the Liberal member for Murray-Wellington. From March to November 1986 he was Shadow Minister for Health, Community Services, Elderly and Retired, and Aboriginal Affairs, moving to Health, Conservation and Land Management, and South-West from November 1986 to April 1988 and Community Services, Health and South-West from April 1988 to March 1989. He served as Opposition Whip from 1992 to 1993 and Parliamentary Secretary of the Cabinet from 1993 to 1997. From 1997 to 2001 he was Parliamentary Secretary assisting the Minister for Mines, Tourism and Sport and Recreation. He returned to the position of Opposition Whip in 2001, serving until his retirement in 2005. From 2001 to 2005 he was also Father of the House.

Bradshaw is the brother of Wayne Bradshaw who was found to be corrupt during his time as Mayor of Wanneroo Council.

Western Australian Legislative Assembly
New seat	Member for Murray-Wellington; 1983–1989	Abolished
New seat	Member for Wellington; 1989–1996	Abolished
New seat	Member for Murray-Wellington; 1996–2005	Abolished
