= Paul Omodei =

Australian politician

Leader of the Opposition in Western Australia
- In office 24 March 2006 – 17 January 2008
- Preceded by: Matt Birney
- Succeeded by: Troy Buswell

Member of the WA Legislative Assembly for Warren-Blackwood Warren (1989–1996)
- In office 4 February 1989 – 6 September 2008
- Preceded by: David Evans
- Succeeded by: Terry Redman

Personal details
- Born: Paul Domenic Omodei; 26 May 1950 (age 76) Manjimup, Western Australia
- Party: Independent (since 2008)
- Other political affiliations: Liberal (until 2008)
- Spouse: Ros Omodei

Paul Domenic Omodei (Italian pronunciation: [omoˈdɛi]; born 26 May 1950) is an Australian politician. He was the leader of the Liberal Party and Leader of the Opposition in Western Australia from 24 March 2006 until 17 January 2008.

== Background ==
Omodei was born in Manjimup, a town in the South West region of Western Australia, and is of Italian ancestry. He attended St Joseph's School in Pemberton and worked as a potato farmer and horticulturalist in the area. He became a councillor for the Shire of Manjimup in 1977 and served his first two stints as Shire President in 1983–1985 and 1987–1988.

At the 1989 election, he won the previously safe Labor seat of Warren for the Liberal Party in the Western Australian Legislative Assembly. In 1992, he became the Shadow Minister for Local Government. When the Liberals won power under Richard Court at the 1993 election, he became Minister for Local Government — a post he held for both of Court's terms of office — and Water Resources. In 1995, he moved from Water Resources to Multicultural and Ethnic Affairs. The following year, he won the enlarged seat of Warren-Blackwood. In 1997, he added the Disability Services portfolio and in 1999 Forest Products.

Following the defeat of the Court government at the 2001 election, Omodei held various shadow cabinet posts. These included Local Government, Emergency Services and Regional Development.

At the 2005 election, where Labor achieved a decisive victory, Colin Barnett resigned as leader of the party, and Matt Birney was elected in Barnett's stead, with Omodei elected deputy leader. But Omodei was forced to resign in October 2005 after he was convicted of unlawfully shooting his son during a rabbit cull. His son's thumb was shot after the gun accidentally went off while being loaded. An appeal against the conviction was dismissed. News coverage during the latter part of Birney's time in office centred on an alleged breach of parliamentary disclosure rules and several gaffes. After a botched attempt to sack shadow attorney-general Sue Walker, a leadership spill was declared on 24 March 2006, which Omodei narrowly won after deputy leader Troy Buswell voted for him over Birney.

In mid-2007, with increasingly hostile coverage from the state newspaper of record, The West Australian, and the Liberal Opposition's failure to make ground on any key issue against the Government despite a number of scandals, speculation emerged in the media that Omodei would be replaced as leader by his deputy, Troy Buswell after the Federal election on 24 November 2007. In December, Newspoll recorded Omodei's preferred premier rating as 13% against premier Alan Carpenter's 63% — ranking as one of the lowest ever figures for an Opposition leader in Australia.

In January 2008, Buswell announced he would challenge Omodei's leadership. After a spill motion carried in the Liberal party room on 17 January, Omodei did not contest the ensuring leadership spill, which was won by Buswell.

After losing the leadership, Omodei sought preselection to move to the Legislative Council after boundary changes saw Warren-Blackwood becoming marginal when it merged with nearby Stirling held by the Nationals.

Although preselected for the winnable second seat for the South West Legislative Council region, a State conference on 3 May 2008 lowered him to an unwinnable fourth position. Omodei expressed his outrage that as a former Liberal leader he had to struggle even to find a seat in the upper house in order to stay in Parliament. However, WA Liberal state president Danielle Blain said that the party preferred that Omodei contest the reconfigured seat of Blackwood-Stirling.

On 19 June, Omodei announced his resignation from the Liberal Party. In his announcement, he stated that in his opinion, Buswell was "not a fit and proper person to lead the party". However, he did not make his resignation official until 19 June.

From 2017 to 2023, he once again was President of the Shire of Manjimup.| mayor = Donelle Buegge He has also been Commissioner of the Shire of Cue (2011–2012) and the Shire of Perenjori (2019–2020).

Political offices
Preceded by Matt Birney	Leader of the Opposition; 2006–2008	Succeeded by Troy Buswell
Party political offices
Preceded by Matt Birney	Leader of the Liberal Party in Western Australia; 2006–2008	Succeeded by Troy Buswell
