= 2026 King's Birthday Honours (Australia) =

Annual honours in Australia

The 2026 King's Birthday Honours for Australia were announced on 8 June 2026 by the Governor-General, Sam Mostyn.

The Birthday Honours are appointments by some of the 15 Commonwealth realms of King Charles III to various orders and honours to reward and highlight good works by citizens of those countries. The Birthday Honours are awarded as part of the King's Official Birthday celebrations during the month of June.

In 2026, only 33% of people awarded Australian King's Birthday Honours were women, and the Order of Australia awards have been regularly criticized for their gender imbalance in past years.

== Order of Australia ==
Order of Australia civil ribbon

Order of Australia military ribbon

=== Companion of the Order of Australia (AC) ===
==== General Division ====
- Elisabeth Janet Calvert-Jones, AO – For eminent service to philanthropy, to the arts, to medical research organisations, to the community, and to children and youth.
- The Honourable William Edward Hodgman – For eminent service to the people and Parliament of Tasmania, to economic growth and policy reform, to the law, and to the community.
- Professor William David Rawlinson, AM – For eminent service to the medical sciences as a virologist, to clinical research and education, and to national and international public health.
- Natasha Jessica Stott Despoja, AO – For eminent service to the prevention of domestic, family and sexual violence, to gender equity, and to the promotion of human rights and global systemic change.
- Professor Terence Chi-Shen Tao – For eminent service to the mathematical sciences, to the global mathematics community, and to tertiary education and academia.

=== Officer of the Order of Australia (AO) ===
==== General Division ====
- The late Professor Katrina Jane Allen – For distinguished service to medical research as a paediatric allergist and gastroenterologist, and to the people and Parliament of Australia.
- The Honourable David John Bartlett – For distinguished service to the people and Parliament of Tasmania, particularly as Premier, to community health and sport, to information technology, and to education.
- Professor Michael Berk – For distinguished service to epidemiology, to preventative medicine, to mental health, and to tertiary education.
- Professor David Gerald Blair – For distinguished service to physics, to precision measurement science, to gravitational wave research, and to scientific education.
- Professor Attila Joseph Brungs – For distinguished service to tertiary education leadership, to research and innovation, and to social justice and equity.
- Emeritus Professor Leo Gerard Carney – For distinguished service to optometric and vision sciences through research and clinical practice, to academia, and to tertiary education.
- Katarina Ruzh Carroll, APM – For distinguished service to law enforcement, to disaster management response and recovery, and to the community.
- Helen Maree Conway – For distinguished service to business and legal governance, to youth social welfare, to gender equity, and to the not-for-profit sector.
- Professor Timothy Mark Davis – For distinguished service to medicine as a consultant physician, to clinical research into diabetes and infectious diseases, and to tertiary education.
- Dr Gordon John de Brouwer, PSM – For distinguished service to public administration, policy and reform, to diversity, to environmental conservation, and to education.
- Emeritus Professor Richard Charles Dowell – For distinguished service to audiology, to the development of the cochlear implant for people who are deaf or hard of hearing, and to tertiary education.
- Professor Valsamma Eapen – For distinguished service to psychiatry, to child and adolescent mental health, to neurodevelopmental research, and to tertiary education.
- Professor Elizabeth Jane Elliott, AM – For distinguished service to paediatric medicine, to women's health, and to medical and social understanding of Fetal Alcohol Spectrum Disorder.
- Professor Timothy John Entwisle – For distinguished service to environmental conservation, to botanical sciences, to the media, to tertiary education, and to the community.
- John Wilmot Flynn – For distinguished service to people who are deaf or hard of hearing, to equality and accessibility, and to Auslan training and education.
- Professor Jozef Gecz – For distinguished service to human translational genetic science, to genomic research, to child health, and to neurodevelopmental disability.
- Stephan William Gollschewski, APM – For distinguished service to law enforcement, to counter-terrorism activities, and to the community.
- Professor David Addison Haig – For distinguished service to international academic relations, to tertiary education, and to organismic and evolutionary biology.
- The Honourable Morris Iemma – For distinguished service to the people and Parliament of New South Wales, particularly as Premier, to the not-for-profit sector, and to community sport.
- Frances Margaret Kelly – For distinguished service to broadcast journalism, to the advancement of social justice, to equality, and to advocacy for the LGBTQIA+ community.
- Emeritus Professor Justin Alastair Kenardy – For distinguished service to clinical psychology, to the understanding of traumatic stress, to governance roles, and to tertiary education.
- The Honourable Robert Gerard Kerin – For distinguished service to the people and Parliament of South Australia, particularly as Premier, to regional and economic development, and to primary industry.
- James White McDowell – For distinguished service to public administration, to the defence capability industry, to science and technology, and to education governance.
- Emeritus Professor Harold David McIntyre – For distinguished service to medicine as a clinician, to medical research and education, to policy development, and to allied health administration.
- Janet Elizabeth Meagher, AM – For distinguished service to mental health and disability, and to advocacy for those with lived experience.
- Professor William Huxley Morgan – For distinguished service to ophthalmology, to neuro-ophthalmic physiology, to space medicine and health, and to tertiary education.
- Gerald Murnane – For distinguished service to literature as an author and novelist, and to tertiary education.
- Sidney Hordern Myer, AM – For distinguished service to the community through philanthropic endeavours, to equality, to the arts, and to Australian-Asian relations.
- Emeritus Professor Michael Stephen Roberts – For distinguished service to pharmaceutical science and medicine, to the advancement of topical drug delivery, and to clinical toxicology research.
- Distinguished Professor Claude Patrick Roux – For distinguished service to forensic science, to technological development, to law enforcement, to ethics, and to tertiary education.
- Professor Raymond Sacks – For distinguished service to otolaryngology, to clinical training, to tertiary education, and to governance roles.
- Professor Margaret Schnitzler – For distinguished service to colorectal surgery, to research, to innovative surgical training, and to tertiary education.
- Professor Hans Peter Soyer – For distinguished service to dermatology, to the diagnosis of skin cancer, to medical research and development, and to governance roles.
- Emeritus Professor Andrew John Spencer – For distinguished service to dentistry, to public health research and policy development, to oral epidemiology, and to tertiary education.
- Dr John Henry Spierings – For distinguished service to social policy research and advocacy, to the not-for-profit sector, and to the community of Port Phillip.
- Patricia Ann Turner, AM – For distinguished service to the Indigenous community through policy development, to governance and leaderships roles, and to improving health outcomes.
- Emeritus Professor Mark Sebastian Wainwright, AM – For distinguished service to the tertiary education administration, to academic research, to Australia-China relations, and to governance roles.
- Martijn Brian Wilder, AM – For distinguished service to environmental conservation, to the renewable energy sector, to sustainable finance, to animal welfare, and to the law.
- The Honourable Benjamin Sana Wyatt – For distinguished service to the people and Parliament of Western Australia, to the Indigenous community, to corporate governance, and to the not-for-profit sector.
- Professor Emeritus Michael Denis Young – For distinguished service to conservation and the environment, to water resource management, and to tertiary education.

==== Military Division ====
Navy

- Rear Admiral Steven John Tiffen, AM, CSM, RAN – For distinguished service in the field of Australian Defence Force ship construction, acquisition and sustainment.

Army

- Lieutenant General (Hon) Cheryl Ann Pearce, AM, CSC – For distinguished service to the Australian Defence Force and to international peace and security through institutional leadership, strategic vision, and enduring commitment to global military cooperation.
- Major General Richard Anthony Vagg, DSC – For distinguished service as the lead military Director General for the Defence Strategic Review and as Head Land Capability.

=== Member of the Order of Australia (AM) ===
==== General Division ====
- Emerita Professor Lynette Kay Abbott – For significant service to soil sciences, to primary industry and agricultural management, and to the community.
- Dr Michael John Adams – For significant service to Indigenous health and education.
- Matthew Bruce Ames – For significant service to community health, to engineering, to business administration, and to corporate
- Lisa Annese – For significant service to the community through social welfare organisations.
- Emeritus Professor Prema-Chandra Athukorala – For significant service to tertiary education, and to international trade and development economics.
- Associate Professor David Lancelot Austin – For significant service to intensive care medicine, to sport, and to education.
- Roland Geoffrey Bailey – For significant service to heritage and environmental rehabilitation and conservation.
- Faith Baisden – For significant service to Indigenous language preservation and education.
- Professor Alexander Baitch – For significant service to power systems engineering, and to electrotechnical standards.
- Professor Greg John Bamber – For significant service to tertiary education, and to international industrial relations research.
- Dr Robin Jordan Beaman – For significant service to marine geology, to ocean mapping, and to geomorphology.
- Emeritus Professor Martin George Bean, CBE – For significant service to tertiary education governance, to digital learning, and to business.
- Anthony Richard Beech – For significant service to industrial relations, and to the community of Western Australia.
- Dr Bianca Reneé Beetson – For significant service to Indigenous art as an educator, curator and artist.
- The late Professor Edward James Blakely – For significant service to urban planning, to regional development, and to social justice.
- Deborah Jane Blakey – For significant service to the superannuation sector, and to corporate governance.
- Dr Tanja Gizela Bohl – For significant service to dermatology as a clinician, and to women's health.
- The late Professor Peter Buckskin, PSM – For significant service to the Indigenous community through education, research, and advocacy roles.
- Professor Emerita Tracey Arlene Bunda – For significant service to tertiary education and research, and to the Indigenous community.
- Emeritus Professor Mark Beaufoy Bush – For significant service to engineering, to tertiary education, and to the community.
- Marika Calfas – For significant service to the transport and shipping industry, to logistics, and to infrastructure.
- Debra Therese Camden – For significant service to the public relations and strategic communications industry.
- Bryce David Camm – For significant service to the beef cattle industry, to horse sports, and to the community.
- Dr Jennifer Lorraine Caruso – For significant service to the Indigenous communities of South Australia.
- Scientia Professor Louise Annette Chappell – For significant service to tertiary education, to human rights, and gender justice.
- Brian William Chatterton, OAM – For significant service to classical music as an educator, performer and artistic director.
- The Very Reverend Dr John Chryssavgis – For significant service to the Orthodox Christian Church, to education, and to advancing ecological
- Salvatore Mario Ciccarello – For significant service to sports administration, and to the community of South Australia.
- Darryl Charles Clout – For significant service to international sports administration, and to the community.
- Deborah Coakley – For significant service to business in the property and investment sector.
- Lyn Cobley – For significant service to the business and financial sector through executive roles.
- Margaret Rose Cole – For significant service to finance through regulatory reform in the industry.
- Professor Grahame John Coleman – For significant service to animal welfare science, and to the discipline of human psychology.
- The late Dr Malcolm Cook – For significant service to international relations, to foreign policy, and to national security.
- Peter Robert Coombs – For significant service to sonography, to tertiary education, and to clinical training.
- Bruce Kenneth Corbett, AFSM – For significant service to the community through emergency response organisations.
- Lucinda Lee Corrigan – For significant service to the meat and livestock industry, to sustainability, and to climate action.
- Edward John Coten – For significant service to sports administration, and to basketball.
- The Honourable Dr Kenneth John Crispin, KC – For significant service to the judiciary, to the law, and to the community of the Australian Capital Territory.
- Professor Simon Darcy – For significant service to tertiary education, and to inclusion and accessible environments.
- The late the Honourable Legh Hewitson Davis – For significant service to the arts, to philanthropy, and to the community of South Australia.
- Professor Mariapia Alessandra Degli-Esposti – For significant service to immunology, to microbiology, and to clinical research and education.
- Dr Kathy Dempsey – For significant service to infection prevention and control, to patient safety, and to clinical governance.
- David Ian Dinte – For significant service to the not-for-profit sector, to the Jewish community, and to children.
- Dr Ursula Bridget Dubosarsky – For significant service to literature as an author of children and young adult books.
- Gavin Horace Dunn – For significant service to the grain growing sector, and to bio dynamic and organic agriculture.
- Robert Dunn – For significant service to international development, to the not-for-profit sector, and to the community.
- Iain Edwards – For significant service to community health, and to people who are blind or have low vision.
- Emeritus Professor Jennifer Joan Edwards – For significant service to the information technology sector, and to tertiary education.
- David Elia – For significant service to the superannuation industry through executive roles.
- Dr Peter Ross Elliott – For significant service to gastroenterology, and to fundraising for research into inflammatory bowel diseases.
- The Honourable Christopher Martin Ellison – For significant service to the people and Parliament of Australia, to tertiary education administration, and to business
- Wayne John Erickson – For significant service to tertiary education, to rugby union, and to the community.
- Geoffrey Clement Fader – For significant service to business development, to vocational training, and to the community.
- Bronwyn Kate Fagan – For significant service to sports administration, to broadcast media, and to the community.
- Professor Emeritus David Malcolm Findlay – For significant service to orthopaedic research, and to the Baptist Church in Australia.
- Susan Jane Gaudion – For significant service to netball as a coach and administrator, and to the media.
- Robert John Gillam – For significant service to primary industry, to local government, and to the community.
- Gerard Bradbury Gillespie – For significant service to conservation, to organic waste management, and to the community.
- Associate Professor Miron Goldwasser – For significant service to orthopaedic surgery, and to clinical education and training.
- Spencer Grammer – For significant service to trailer manufacturing, and to Defence capability.
- Christine Teresa Grant – For significant service to preserving Indigenous culture and heritage.
- Emeritus Professor Ross Ernest Griffith – For significant service to tertiary education, to the textile industry, and to the community.
- The Honourable Brendon John Grylls – For significant service to the people and Parliament of Western Australia, and to the community.
- Neil Stuart Guard – For significant service to community health, to people with disability, and to social welfare.
- Dr Patricia Lorraine Hamilton – For significant service to women in rural and remote Australia, and to the agricultural industry.
- Ian Maxwell Hannah – For significant service to golf administration, to surf life saving, and to community sports.
- Professor Graeme Eric Harper – For significant service to literature, to education, and to creative writing.
- Dr Jennifer Anne Harrison – For significant service to youth and children's psychiatry, and to the arts.
- Brett Harrod – For significant service to surf lifesaving, and to the community.
- Professor Noel Edward Hayman – For significant service to medicine, particularly to Indigenous health care and medical education.
- James Thomas Hazel – For significant service to the finance sector through a range of senior board roles.
- Robert Mark Hecek – For significant service to property valuation, particularly as an educator and mentor.
- Matthew Lewis Higgins – For significant service to heritage conservation, and to the environment.
- Ian Clarence Hill – For significant service to public administration in Western Australia, and to vocational education.
- Howard William Hobbs – For significant service to the people and Parliament of Queensland, and to the community.
- Christine Wendy Holgate – For significant service to business through a range of executive roles.
- Craig Joseph Hollywood – For significant service to the community through social welfare organisations.
- Mary Frances Hoodless – For significant service to regional development, and to the communities of the Riverina and Murray regions.
- Associate Professor Anne Margaret Howard – For significant service to dermatology as a clinician, teacher, examiner and mentor.
- Dr Jonathon Leigh Howard – For significant service to tertiary education, and to conservation and sustainability.
- The Reverend Emeritus Professor Phillip John Hughes – For significant service to the sociology of religion, to academia, to social cohesion, and to the community.
- Mark Irwin – For significant service to local government, to surf lifesaving, and to the community.
- Professor Terence Jeyaretnam – For significant service to social justice, and to environmental conservation and sustainability.
- Dr David John Joske – For significant service to haematology, and to pioneering the use of integrative oncology.
- Michael Kennedy – For significant service to snow sport development and advancement in Australia, and to international sport
- Anthony Shane Kittel – For significant service to the electronics industry, and to the defence sector.
- Adrian John Kloeden – For significant service to business and commerce, and to the tertiary education sector.
- The Honourable Robert Charles Kucera, APM – For significant service to the community of Western Australia through a range of organisations.
- The Honourable Rene Lucien Le Miere, KC – For significant service to the judiciary, to the law, and to the arts.
- Emeritus Professor Zheng Xiang Li – For significant service to geoscience and Earth dynamics research, and to tertiary education.
- Dr Mark Lintermans – For significant service to freshwater conservation and the environment, and to fisheries ecology.
- Professor Ryan Lister – For significant service to biochemistry, to genetic science, and to neuroscience.
- Joan Margaret Lyons – For significant service to the arts, and to the community through philanthropic support.
- Professor Richard Alan Macdonell – For significant service to neurology, to clinical electrophysiology, and to tertiary education.
- Dr Helen Mackie – For significant service to rehabilitation medicine, and to research and treatment of lymphoedema.
- The late Mr Ian Mackintosh – For significant service to accounting through developing corporate and public sector reporting practices.
- Professor Colin MacLeod – For significant service to clinical psychology, and to advancing research into emotions.
- Debra Gladys Maher – For significant service to the law, to women and children, and to the community.
- Stephen James Margetic – For significant service to the building and construction industry, and to philanthropy.
- Professor Anthony Frederick Masters – For significant service to tertiary education and governance, and to chemical science.
- Edwina Diana McCann – For significant service to journalism, to the fashion industry, and to arts governance.
- Christopher John McCormack – For significant service to triathlon as a competitor and administrator, and to charitable organisations.
- Ewen Neil McDonald – For significant service to international relations, to public administration, and to the community.
- Diana Helen McLaurin – For significant service to the arts, to golf, and to environmental conservation.
- John Rove McManus – For significant service to broadcast media, to entertainment, and to the community.
- The late Justice Kate McMillan, SC – For significant service to the judiciary, to the law, and to the community.
- Dr Joanna Christine Mendelssohn – For significant service to art history as a researcher and author.
- Professor Warwick Middleton – For significant service to psychiatric medicine, and to research into and treatment of complex traumagenic dissociation.
- Dr Andrew James Mulcahy – For significant service to medical administration, and to anaesthetics.
- Yvonne Phyllis Mullins – For significant service to international sports administration, and to athletics.
- Dr Elizabeth Mary Murphy – For significant service to colorectal and general surgery, and to clinical education and training.
- The Honourable Michael Philip Murray – For significant service to the people and Parliament of Western Australia.
- Warwick Martin Negus – For significant service to the not-for-profit, education and financial sectors.
- Professor John Richard Newton – For significant service to mental health care, and to the psychiatry profession.
- Dr John Bevan North – For significant service to orthopaedic medicine, to international surgery outreach, and to education and training.
- Associate Professor Peter David Nottle – For significant service to laparoscopic and gastrointestinal surgery, to clinical leadership, and to education.
- Dr Hope Gertrude O'Chin – For significant service to the Indigenous community as an artist and educator.
- Emeritus Professor Carolyn Elizabeth Oldham – For significant service to tertiary education, and to environmental and water science.
- Professor John Kevin Olynyk – For significant service to the health sciences, and to gastroenterology and hepatology.
- Kim Michelle Owens – For significant service to athletics as an official and administrator.
- James Ian Pagent – For significant service to the community through not-for-profit organisations.
- Professor Peter Parashos – For significant service to dentistry, particularly endodontology, and to tertiary education.
- Professor Konrad Pesudovs – For significant service to optometry and ophthalmology research, and to clinical education and training.
- Robert Dawson Petie – For significant service to industrial relations, to corporate governance, and to the community.
- Ross Edward Pinney – For significant service to the community through social welfare and service groups.
- Christopher Keith Raine – For significant service to community health, and to social welfare.
- Scientia Professor Rosemary Gail Rayfuse – For significant service to tertiary education, and to international and environmental law.
- Professor Emeritus Trevor Gordon Redgrave – For significant service to physiology and molecular biology research, and to tertiary education.
- Mark David Reid – For significant service to community health, and to the rights of people living with HIV/AIDS.
- Professor Sarah Jane Roberts-Thomson – For significant service to pharmaceutical medicine, to academic leadership, and to tertiary education.
- Terrence Albert Roe – For significant service to veterans and their families, and to the community.
- Professor Anna Rosamilia – For significant service to urogynaecology through education, mentoring and training.
- Barry James Sandison – For significant service to public administration, particularly in health and welfare.
- Professor Matthaios Santamouris – For significant service to architecture, to energy, and to environmental quality.
- Bridget Ruth Shaw – For significant service to physiotherapy, to clinical training, and to advanced practice leadership.
- Marie Elizabeth Shaw, KC – For significant service to the law, to the legal profession, and to the community.
- Anthony John Sheehan – For significant service to Australia's national security, and to public administration.
- The late Toby Simkin – For significant service to musical theatre, and to major event production.
- Sally Jane Smart – For significant service to the arts as an administrator, educator and visual artist.
- Carmel Desley Smith – For significant service to golf through governance roles, and as a player and administrator.
- Gary Alan Smith – For significant service to the Indigenous community of Western Australia, and to education.
- Professor Michael John Solomon – For significant service to gastrointestinal surgery, to surgical outcomes research, and to the community.
- Dr Shane Sydney Sondergeld – For significant service to rural and remote medicine, to general practice, and to the community.
- Kay Spencer – For significant service to the community through the charitable sector, and to the retail industry.
- Dr Rebecca Elizabeth Spindler – For significant service to conservation science, to wildlife reproduction research, and to biodiversity
- Emeritus Professor Kaye Christine Stacey – For significant service to tertiary and secondary education, and to mathematics.
- James Peter Stanton PSM – For significant service to conservation, to wildlife ecology, and to wet tropics management.
- Jason Steinberg – For significant service to the Jewish community in Queensland, and to historical commemoration.
- Associate Professor Michael Paul Steyn – For significant service to anaesthesiology and peri-operative medicine, and to health leadership.
- Professor Andrew Mark Stripp – For significant service to medical administration through executive and governance roles.
- Dr Julja Isabel Szuster – For significant service to music as a researcher, educator and administrator.
- Raymond Lewis Tanner – For significant service to social welfare, and to the transport and logistics industry.
- Mary-Lynne Taylor – For significant service to town planning and development, and to the law.
- Simon Tedeschi – For significant service to music as a concert pianist.
- The Honourable David Alan Templeman – For significant service to the arts, and to the people and Parliament of Western Australia.
- Jonathan Leo Teperson – For significant service to the Jewish community through a range of organisations.
- Damon Christopher Thomas – For significant service to local government, to the law, and to the community of Tasmania.
- Professor Robert John Thomas, OAM – For significant service to surgical oncology, to patient-centred cancer care, and to system reform.
- Luke Ashley Thomson – For significant service to primary and secondary education, and to independent schools.
- Professor Bernard Edward Tuch – For significant service to endocrinology, and to medical research.
- Edward Richard Tudor, OAM – For significant service to secondary education governance, and to the not-for-profit sector.
- Professor Sean Michael Tweedy – For significant service to para sport, to adapted physical activity research, and to tertiary education.
- Frances Mary Underwood – For significant service to music education, to the arts, and to the community of Tasmania.
- Tim Mark Ungar – For significant service to business, to the arts and cultural sectors, and to philanthropy.
- The late James Matthew Valentine – For significant service to the media as a radio presenter and television host, to music, and to children's literature.
- Dr Andrew Leonard Van Essen – For significant service to podiatry as a clinician and educator, and to specialist podiatric surgery.
- Professor Balasubramaniam Venkatesh – For significant service to critical and intensive care medicine, to infection control, and to tertiary education.
- Kathryn Mary Vines – For significant service to community health through cancer support.
- Professor Emeritus Ljubo Vlacic – For significant service to control systems engineering, and to tertiary education.
- Brett David Walker – For significant service to the community through social welfare organisations, and to the law.
- James Allan Walker – For significant service to the mining sector, to history preservation organisations, and to the community.
- Louise Mary Walsh – For significant service to the community through philanthropic governance, and to the arts.
- Dr Raymond Kenneth Weekes – For significant service to business management and education.
- Neil Donald Westbury, PSM – For significant service to the Indigenous communities of the Northern Territory and Victoria.
- Bradley Brian Woods – For significant service to the tourism and hospitality industry, and to the community of Western Australia.
- Elizabeth Adele Woods – For significant service to the law, to people with disability, and to basketball administration.
- Vicki Louise Woods – For significant service to the tourism and hospitality industry, and to the community.
- Gary Ronald Worboys, APM – For significant service to the community through emergency response organisations.
- Emeritus Professor Stephen Rade Zubrick – For significant service to medical science and research, particularly in children's and youth development.

==== Military Division ====
Navy

- Warrant Officer Bradley Valentine Lahey – For exceptional service as a Command Warrant Officer in the Royal Australian Navy.
- Commodore Paul James O'Grady, DSM, CSM, RAN – For exceptional service to the Royal Australian Navy in senior leadership positions.
- Commodore Heath Jay Robertson, CSC, RAN – For exceptional service to the Royal Australian Navy in training, strategic engagement, and senior leadership roles.
- Commodore Jan Elizabeth Wiltshire, CSC & Bar, RAN – For exceptional service in delivering strategic personnel capability for the Australian Defence Force.

Army

- Brigadier Shaun James Hoffmann – For exceptional performance of duty as Director General Land Manoeuvre Systems.
- Brigadier David William McCammon, DSM – For exceptional performance of duties as Commander 3rd Brigade and Commander Australian Army Cadets.
- Brigadier Timothy Peter Orders – For exceptional service as an Officer in the Australian Army over various positions.

Air Force

- Warrant Officer Matthew Stephen Elliott – For exceptional service in workforce analytics, major project acquisition support, and enterprise data reform for the Royal Australian Air Force.
- Group Captain Martin Thomas Parker – For exceptional service as Commanding Officer Number 75 Squadron and his role in the development of agile operations and battle worthiness.
- Wing Commander Todd Matthew Woodford – For exceptional service in the advancement of Australia's airborne electronic attack and long-range strike capabilities.
- Wing Commander Susan Elizabeth Yates – For exceptional performance of duty in improving the lives of women in service and demonstrated commitment to improving the retention of women in the Royal Australian Air Force.

=== Medal of the Order of Australia (OAM) ===
==== General Division ====
- Steven Adams – For service to the Indigenous community through a range of roles.
- Pam Ann Ahern – For service to animal welfare.
- Ziaul Islam Ahmad – For service to journalism, and to the Muslim community.
- Mohammed Shabbir Alam – For service to the community through emergency response organisations.
- Donald Leslie Alchin – For service to swimming.
- Justice Murray Robert Aldridge – For service to conservation, to orchid growing, and to the law.
- Annabelle Cecil Alexander – For service to the arts, and to the community.
- Douglas Phillip Alexander – For service to the arts, and to the community.
- Mohammed Ali – For service to the community of the Australian Capital Territory.
- His Eminence, Professor Sheikh Salim Mahmoud Alwan – For service to Islam and Qur'anic studies.
- Panagiotis (Peter) Andrinopoulos – For service to the Greek community of Melbourne.
- Maxine Rhonda Appo – For service to tourism, and to the Indigenous community of Queensland.
- Giovanni Arco – For service to veterans.
- Deborah Attard Portughes – For service to the community through the not-for-profit sector.
- Ross Andrew Augustine – For service to the community of Frankston.
- Colin Roy Axup – For service to secondary education.
- Leslie John Baguley – For service to the community through charitable initiatives.
- Heather June Baird – For service to children.
- Susan Helen Bamford – For service to netball.
- Gary Andrew Barclay – For service to swimming.
- Dr Susan Barker – For service to conservation and the environment.
- Trevor Hugh Barron – For service to lawn bowls.
- Maxwell Kenneth Batey – For service to swimming as a coach.
- Robert George Batrouney – For service to the community through a range of roles.
- Ethel May Batten – For service to the community, and to youth.
- John Kevin Bayliss – For service to turf management, and to vocational education.
- Roger John Bayliss – For service to business and trade, and to the community.
- Dr Andrew Alder Beattie – For service to the community of Coffs Harbour.
- Kristy Patricia Beecham – For service to the community of Narooma.
- James Russell Bell – For service to the arts, particularly through music and theatre.
- Dr Constantine George Berbatis – For service to the community of Perth.
- Dr Imad Berro – For service to the Arabic community of New South Wales.
- Marianne Birch – For service to the finance industry.
- John Bird – For service to local government, and to the community of Collie.
- Wanda Bird – For service to horse training, and to the community of Collie.
- Robert Douglas Blair – For service to community history.
- The late Mr Keiran Robert Booth – For service to community health through a range of organisations.
- Elizabeth Anne Bowditch – For service to the community through charitable initiatives.
- Paul Roger Boyce – For service to architecture.
- Dr Fiona Kathleen Boyd – For service to general and palliative care medicine.
- Margaret Brooks – For service to the communities of Monbulk and Kallista.
- Dr Linda Suzanne Broome – For service to animal welfare.
- Anthony George Brown – For service to local government administration.
- Silvia Fay Brown – For service to nursing.
- John Kenyon Browning – For service to education administration, and to the community.
- Gregory John Budworth – For services to the community through social housing.
- Reiltin Maire Bullock – For service to the community of Campbelltown.
- Barry Arnold Burdett – For service to the community of Mannum.
- Christopher Edward Burgess – For service to veterans and their families.
- The late Mrs Annette Margaret Burke – For service to the community through a range of organisations.
- Kay Marie Burton – For service to swimming.
- Rodney Malcolm Bush – For service to basketball, and to the community.
- Malcolm Butterfield – For service to surf lifesaving, and to charitable organisations.
- Mary Lou Byrne – For service to the community through refugee support.
- Kevin William Camm – For service to veterans' welfare.
- Max Albert Carstedt – For service to electrical engineering.
- Stephen Andrew Carter – For service to community health.
- The late Mrs Carol Frances Cartwright – For service to the museums and galleries sector.
- Christine Laura Castley – For service to the multicultural community, and to public administration.
- Stephen John Cattley – For service to cricket.
- Tamara Joy Cavenett – For service to psychology.
- Usha Kiran Chandra – For service to the Indian community of Queensland.
- Elaine Chia – For service to arts administration.
- The late Mr Andjelko Cimera – For service to football administration.
- Dr Andrew Francis Clarke – For service to equine welfare.
- Juley Clarke – For service to primary education.
- John Patrick Cleary – For service to the community through the not-for-profit sector.
- Judith Ann Clements – For service to the community of Whittlesea.
- Peter Robert Clisdell – For service to the real estate industry, and to the community.
- Pauline Mary Coady – For service to community social welfare.
- Keith Raymond Coffey – For service to the community of Darebin.
- Brett Travis Cole – For service to youth, and to the community.
- Paul Reginald Cole – For service to mountain biking.
- Justin Andrew Coleman – For service to the hospitality industry, and to the community.
- Kevin John Collins – For service to the community of Croydon.
- Brendan Patrick Condon – For service to conservation and the environment.
- Dr Thomas Michael Condon – For service to dentistry, and to the community of Southern Downs.
- Rachel Marie Condos-Fields – For service to youth, and to the community.
- Mark Peter Connell – For service to youth through scouting.
- Stuart John Connew – For service to music, and to the church.
- John Oliver Cook – For service to the community of Orange.
- Sharon Jane Cook – For service to the banking industry, and to the law.
- Wendy Joy Cook – For service to animal welfare.
- Roderick James Cooke – For service to the community through a range of organisations.
- Stephen Leonardo Coppel – For service to the museums and galleries sector.
- Dr Wesley Cormick – For service to ultrasound and general practice medicine.
- Noline Gai Cornhill – For service to the communities of Canberra and Forster-Tuncurry.
- Marshall Kelvin Cox – For service to the community of Toowoomba.
- Dr Luke Anthony Coyle – For service to haematology.
- Judith Crighton – For service to conservation and wildlife.
- Michael John Crosbie – For service to the community of Sunshine.
- Patricia Janet Crosbie – For service to the community of Winchelsea.
- Barbara Mary Cullen – For service to the community of Tocumwal.
- Robert James Cullen – For service to the community of Tocumwal.
- Robin George Cummins – For service to veterans, and to the community.
- William Noel Curnoe – For service to rugby league.
- The late Mr Lynne Gary Curtis – For service to the sport of clay target shooting.
- John Sydenham Custance – For service to surf lifesaving.
- Deslee Karen Daley – For service to youth, and to the community.
- Paul James Daly – For service to Australian rules football, and to the community of Onkaparinga.
- Brian Davidson – For service to community health.
- Ray John Davidson – For service to cricket, and to the community.
- Pamela May Davis – For service to the community of Drysdale.
- Dean de Haas – For service to the community through social welfare organisations.
- Theodoor De Lyster – For service to people with disability.
- Dr Dov Aharon Degen – For service to medicine, and to mental health support.
- John David Devine – For service to the community of Lane Cove.
- His Honour Judge Douglas Raymond Dick – For service to the law.
- Sharon Mun-Foong Ding – For service to people with disability.
- Fran Mary Doig – For service to the community through charitable organisations.
- Geoffrey Robert D'Ombrain – For service to music, and to education.
- The Venerable Edward William Doncaster – For service to the Anglican Church in Australia.
- Dr William Francis Donovan – For service to secondary education, and to the community.
- Peter Dourios – For service to the Greek community of Melbourne.
- Brian Joseph Downs – For service to the community of Ashgrove.
- The late Mrs Joyce Myrtle Dowsett – For service to the community of Stawell.
- Janet Celia Drummond – For service to local government, and to the community.
- Florence Drury – For service to the community through a range of roles.
- Bijinder Dugal – For service to aged welfare.
- The late Mr Phillip Joseph Duggan – For service to strata management, and to the community.
- Barbara Joan Dunlop – For service to the community, and to the arts.
- Vicki Ann Dunne – For service to the people and Parliament of the Australian Capital Territory.
- Peter John Dunphy – For service to table tennis.
- Janice Elizabeth Earle – For service to the community through emergency response organisations.
- Trevor Raymond Eddy – For service to the community through a range of organisations.
- Jane Anne Edwards – For service to the performing arts, particularly music.
- Linda Emery – For service to the community of Wingecarribee.
- Sandra Jane Evans – For service to softball.
- Dr Kenneth James Facer – For service to medicine as a general practitioner.
- Gabrielle Marie Fachry – For service to the Lebanese community.
- Kenneth Thomas Fayle – For service to veterans and their families.
- Professor Suran Loshana Fernando – For service to medicine in the field of immunology.
- Karen Lesley Field – For service to charitable organisations, and to the mining sector.
- Lieutenant Commander Kym Desmond Fisher – For service to rowing as a coach.
- Steven Fisher – For service to child welfare organisations.
- Margaret Esther Fleming – For service to community history in Victoria.
- Janice Marea Florence – For service to the arts, and to people with disability.
- Graeme Jerard Foale – For service to sailing.
- Gillian Patricia Forsyth – For service to the community, and to heritage conservation.
- Wayne Stanley Fossey – For service to the Indigenous communities of southern Queensland.
- Christine Ann Fox – For service to health administration, and to the community.
- Elsta Foy – For service to the community of Broome.
- Ian Leo Frame – For service to youth, and to rugby league.
- Margaret Leigh Freeman – For service to the church.
- Margretta Judith Fuller – For service to conservation and the environment.
- David Dalroy Funnell – For service to local government, and to the community of Camden.
- Dr Dilipkumar Gahankari – For service to plastic and reconstructive surgery.
- Associate Professor Alan William Gale – For service to cardiothoracic surgery, and to the community.
- Eric Galloway – For service to sport, particularly rugby league.
- Lorna May Gamble – For service to music through the church.
- Ian Victor Gardner – For services to youth through solar modelling.
- Dr Atul Kumar Garg – For service to the community through a range of organisations.
- Jacqueline Patricia Gasson – For service to the arts as a ceramicist.
- Colin John Gerrard – For service to the community of Beaufort.
- Bernadette Gigliotti – For service to secondary and vocational education.
- Richard Grant Giles – For service to the community of the Northern Territory.
- Robert Hugh Glass – For service to the community of Ballarat.
- Margaret Rae Gleeson – For service to the arts.
- The late Mr Ronald Norman Glencross – For service to environmental conservation.
- Graham Neil Gliddon – For service to basketball.
- Sandra Goldstraw – For service to the community through a range of roles.
- Kerry Maureen Goode – For service to the community through performing arts.
- The late Mr Richard Lindsay Gordon – For service to the communities of Killarney Heights and Forestville.
- Valerie May Gordon – For service to the communities of Forestville and Killarney Heights.
- Dr Jon William Graftdyk – For service to the community through cancer support groups.
- Lorraine Leigh Greenfield – For service to remote communities.
- Phillip George Greentree – For service to cricket, and to the community of the Hawkesbury.
- Philip Hilton Greenwood, SC – For service to the law.
- John Greenwood-Smith – For service to the community through emergency response organisations.
- Ann Campbell Gregg – For service to the community of Peppermint Grove.
- The late Mrs Helen Gregory – For service to community history.
- Paul William Griffiths – For service to sport, to people with disability, and to the community.
- Richard John Griffiths – For service to the community of Darwin.
- Marcus Grinblat, ESM – For service to the community through emergency response organisations.
- Dr Helen Judith Grzyb – For service to the community of Western Australia.
- Gerard Michael Guerin – For service to the community of Kadina.
- Suzane Margaret Hamilton – For service to the community of the Tilligerry Peninsula.
- Dr Roger Hampson – For service to medicine as a pathologist.
- Teresa Gayle Handicott – For service to business, and to corporate governance.
- The Reverend Dr Timothy David Hanna – For service to the church, and to charitable organisations.
- Josephine Daisy Harpur – For service to the community of the Northern Beaches.
- Dr Timothy Martin Harpur – For service to the community of the Northern Beaches.
- Gregory Mark Harris – For service to sports administration.
- Jeffrey Mervyn Harvey – For service to the community through a range of organisations.
- Robert Haslam – For service to the community of the Riverland region.
- John Whitton Haslem – For service to the community through a range of roles.
- Michael Norman Hawking – For service to cricket, and to sports administration.
- Dawn Elizabeth Hay – For service to the community through a range of roles.
- Genevieve Maida Hebart – For service to the community of the Barossa, and to nursing.
- Donald Alfred Henderson – For service to surf life saving.
- Dr Peter Richard Henderson – For service to obstetrics and gynaecology.
- Feona Leigh Henness – For service to the community of the Hills District.
- Elspeth Clare Hensler – For service to the law.
- David John Hill – For service to youth.
- The late Mr Ian Murray Hill – For service to the community through a range of organisations.
- Joanne Kay Hill – For service to basketball.
- Dr Peter Robert Hill – For service to dentistry.
- Laura Maree Hogan – For service to people with disability.
- Craig Robert Holden – For service to the community, and to surf lifesaving.
- Susan Margaret Hood – For service to regional agricultural shows, and to youth.
- Dr Noemi Horvath – For service to haematology.
- Trevor Raymond Howard – For service to sport, and to the community of Western Australia.
- Winwood Howard – For service to the community through a range of organisations.
- Silvio Iadarola – For service to the Italian community of South Australia
- Noshir Irani – For service to the community.
- Sally Irwin – For service to the community, particularly to survivors of modern slavery.
- Kristina Jackson – For service to the community through a range of organisations.
- The late Mr Alan Jenkins – For service to fraternal organisations, and to the community.
- Dr Paul Ignatius Jenkins – For service to medicine as a paediatrician.
- The late Mr Trent Andrew Jennison – For service to community health, to people with disability, and to social welfare.
- Trish Johnson – For service to the law, and to the legal profession.
- Anne Louise Johnston – For service to child cancer support.
- Glenn Kenneth Johnston – For service to the Indigenous community.
- Robert Norman Johnstone – For service to the community, and to secondary education.
- Marian Jones – For service to decorative food arts.
- Geoffrey Joy – For service to education.
- Patricia Kaye – For service to the community of Gisborne.
- Jennifer Mary Kearney – For service to the community of Bacchus Marsh.
- The late Mr Peter Kearsey – For service to the community of Inverell.
- Shannan Louise Keen – For service to Locked-in Syndrome research.
- Michael Timothy Kelly – For service to the community of Corowa.
- Patricia Kent – For service to the community of northwest Tasmania.
- Owen Heathfield Kilpatrick – For service to rugby league, and to the superannuation industry.
- Deuk Rae Kim – For service to boxing.
- Gary King – For service to the community of Koo Wee Rup.
- Geoffrey Eric King – For service to broadcast media.
- Nigel Howard King – For service to the community through a range of organisations.
- Kenneth David Kinloch – For service to youth, and to the community.
- Peter Morton Kinsey – For service to surf lifesaving.
- Dr Rodney Kirkpatrick – For service to community history.
- Alva Joyce Knuckey – For service to charitable organisations.
- Stephen Francis Laffan – For service to the community through voluntary roles with sporting associations.
- Tracey John Lake – For service to surf lifesaving.
- Lieutenant Colonel Stefan Franz Landherr, RFD – For service to veterans.
- Anthony Larkin – For service to secondary education, and to school sports.
- Alex Laslowski – For service to medical science, and to anatomical pathology.
- Matthew Robert Laverty – For service to the community through charitable initiatives.
- Ross Andrew Lee – For service to the law, and to the community.
- Craig Anthony Leeson – For service to media, and to the community.
- Robert John Lehunt – For service to the plastics industry.
- Paul James Lemmon – For service to surf lifesaving.
- Dr Lana Adele Leslie-Henfling – For service to the Indigenous community through a range of roles.
- The late Mr Lewis Joshua Levi – For service to the Jewish community of New South Wales.
- Christopher Lockyer Lewis – For service to Australian rules football, and to the Indigenous community.
- Maxwell John Lewis – For service to veterans, and to the community.
- Joan Catherine Liley – For service to conservation, and to the community.
- Kenneth George Little – For service to the community of Port Macquarie.
- The Honourable Francis Michael Logan – For service to the people and Parliament of Western Australia.
- Nicholas Michael Logan – For service to the pharmacy profession.
- William Charles Lowis – For service to local government, and to the community of the Burdekin Shire.
- Brian Anthony Lulham – For service to sport, and to the law.
- Susan Barbara Lyle – For service to the community of Gunnedah.
- Mary-Jane Veronica Lynch – For service to rural and remote nursing.
- Michael Colum Lynch – For service to the community of Parkes.
- Anna Kyriakides Maas – For service to the museums and galleries sector.
- David Charles Macallister – For service to the community through aquatic safety organisations.
- Jennifer Mackay – For service to primary education.
- Dr Ross Duncan MacPherson – For service to medicine as an anaesthetist.
- James Thomas Maguire – For service to gymnastics, and to rugby league.
- Dr Gabor Attilla Major – For service to rheumatology.
- Neville Ronald Male – For service to photography.
- Lieutenant Colonel Kevin Anthony Maloney (Retd) – For service to rugby union, and to the community.
- Stefano Marafiote – For service to agriculture.
- Michele Denise Marquet – For service to primary education.
- William Barry Marsh – For service to literature as a writer.
- Kenneth John Martin – For service to the community of Coleambally.
- The late Mr Robert Eric Mason – For service to the wool growing industry, and to the community.
- The late Mr Kenneth Francis Maurer – For service to thanatology, and to the community.
- Albert John Maxwell – For service to surf lifesaving.
- Tallilah May – For service to the Jewish community.
- Dr William McAuliffe – For service to interventional neuroradiology.
- Nicholas Hatch McCormack – For service to golf.
- Geoffrey Charles McCracken – For service to Australian rules football.
- Michele McDonald – For service to education.
- Betty Lee McGeever – For service to the community, particularly refugees and asylum seekers.
- Betty McGuire – For service to softball.
- Robin Lee McKendrick – For service to local government, and to the community of Launceston.
- Elizabeth McKenzie – For service to the community through music.
- The late Mrs Marion Elizabeth McKinnon – For service to community history.
- Neil John McWhannell – For service to the community, and to the not-for-profit sector.
- Frank Laurence Meng – For service to the community, and to engineering.
- Merle Elizabeth Miller – For service to the Indigenous community of Victoria.
- Ian Andrew Milliner – For service to diver training and accreditation.
- David Raymond Milne – For service to youth.
- Saurabh Mishra – For service to the community through a range of organisations.
- Allan Raymond Mitchell – For service to local government, and to the community.
- Lawrence Raymond Molachino – For service to the community of Ingham.
- Prudence Jean Molnar – For service to the community through a range of organisations.
- Dr Brian Roy Moon – For service to tertiary education.
- David Arthur Morgan – For service to youth, and to the community.
- Richard Vincent Morgan – For service to youth, and to the community.
- Darren Anthony Mort – For service to the law.
- Emeritus Professor Peter Maxwell Muirhead – For service to the maritime industry, and to tertiary education.
- Timothy Craig Muirhead – For service to reconciliation in Western Australia.
- Andrew Lewis Mullett – For service to Australian rules football.
- Michael Andrew Murphy – For service to sport administration, particularly diving.
- Dr Sandra Janette Nash – For service to music education.
- Scott Bradley Nash – For service to local government, the law, and to the legal profession.
- Mark Anthony Neave – For service to youth.
- Dr Robert Charles Newby – For service to conservation and the environment.
- Nicholas Ronald Newton – For service to surf lifesaving.
- Kathleen Majella Noonan – For service to social welfare.
- Keven Maxwell Nordstrom – For service to the poultry industry.
- William Arnold Oates – For service to history preservation.
- Issam Obeid – For service to the Lebanese community of Sydney, and to taekwondo.
- David Patrick O'Brien – For service to the community through the not-for-profit sector.
- Kevin O'Brien – For service to rowing.
- The late Mr Brian Francis O'Connor – For service to local government, and to the community.
- Dennis Oldenhove – For service to veterans, and to the community of Macclesfield.
- Catherine Ruth O'Leary – For service to the community through a range of roles.
- Anne Jillian Oliver – For service to the community through a range of roles.
- Christine Jennifer Oliver – For service to the communities of the Gippsland region, and to youth.
- Leo Harmen op den Brouw, ESM – For service to the community of East Gippsland.
- Dr Anne Pang – For service to the Chinese community of Melbourne, and to women.
- Ghestimani Paschalidis-Chilas – For service to the multicultural community of New South Wales.
- Philip Garry Patterson – For service to primary industry.
- Rodney David Payne – For service to the community through the not-for-profit sector.
- Air Commodore Ian Murray Pearson (Retd) – For service to veterans' welfare.
- Jeffrey Ian Pekin – For service to the community of the Horsham region.
- Duncan John Perryman, CSM RAN – For service to history preservation.
- The late Dr Roger Frank Peters, RFD – For service to community health, particularly as a psychologist.
- Keith Stanley Pettigrew – For service to the community of Leopold.
- Elisabeth Lesley Pickering – For service to secondary education, and to the community.
- Lieutenant Colonel Patrick Anthony Pickett, CSM – For service to the performing arts, particularly through music.
- Franciscus Joseph Pikardt – For service to secondary education.
- Keith Norman Pitman – For service to veterans and their families.
- Associate Professor Christopher Stephen Pokorny – For service to community health.
- Andrew James Porter – For service to business, and to corporate governance.
- Geoffrey Samuel Prenter – For service to the print media as a sports journalist.
- Lesley Roxanne Pryor – For service to youth through foster care.
- John Stewart Pugh – For service to swimming.
- Paolo Rajo – For service to the Italian community of New South Wales.
- Brian Warwick Ralph – For service to secondary education.
- Marie Elizabeth Ransom – For service to community welfare.
- Joylene Rappo – For service to community health through bereavement support.
- The Honourable Ljiljanna Maria Ravlich – For service to the people and Parliament of Western Australia, and to the community.
- Professor Keir James Reeves – For service to tertiary education.
- Julia Monique Reichstein – For service to the community, and to librarianship.
- Dr Richard Ekenhead Reid – For service to community through history preservation organisations.
- Catherine Margaret Remenyi – For service to the community of Torquay.
- Silvia Renda – For service to the Portuguese community of Victoria.
- Jane Richardson – For service to the communities of the East Grampians.
- Joanne Charlotte Riley – For service to the suicide prevention advocacy.
- Geoffrey Colin Robertson – For service to baseball.
- Tammy Margaret Robinson – For service to the community, and to youth.
- Susan Rodgers-Wilson – For service to the community through charitable organisations.
- Kenneth John Roma – For service to veterans.
- Peter Alan Romey – For service to conservation and the environment.
- The late Mr Neil Rosenfeld – For service to ballroom dancing.
- Patrick John Rowe – For service to veterans and their families.
- Dr Helen Brenda Roxburgh – For service to general practice, particularly in the areas of women’s health.
- Dr Pauline Elizabeth Rule – For service to history, and to secondary education.
- Daniel John Ryan – For service to community health.
- George Christopher Sachse – For service to veterans, and to the community.
- Fawaz Sankari – For service to the community, and to the banking sector.
- James Frederick Sargeant – For service to sailing.
- Andrew Peter Satsia – For service to the community of Canberra.
- Diana Sawyer – For service to the communities of Barwon South West.
- Desmond Alwyn Schirmer – For service to the Victor Harbor and the Southern Fleurieu communities.
- Stephan Bruce Schnierer – For service to fisheries management.
- The Reverend Dr Noel Clifford Schultz – For service to the Lutheran and Uniting Churches.
- Colin James Schulz – For service to surf lifesaving.
- Leone Gwendolen Scott – For service to child and youth support.
- Jillian Sears – For service to people with disability, and to equality and diversity.
- Cherry Josephine Servis – For service to community health.
- Kuranda Seyfettin Seyit – For service to the multicultural communities of Victoria.
- Carla Sharp – For service to the Jewish community.
- Lloyd William Shepherdson – For service to the community of Margaret River.
- Clarence John Sheraton – For service to the community through a range of roles.
- Emeritus Professor Susan Sheridan – For service to the arts, and to the humanities.
- Charles James Sherrin – For service to veterans and their families.
- David John Shields – For service to surf lifesaving.
- Raymond Charles Shoobert – For service to the community of Murrurundi.
- Simone Antoinette Short – For service to the community through charitable initiatives.
- Dr Emad Walid Shublaq – For service to engineering.
- Maureen Edith Simpfendorfer – For service to nursing.
- John Drazen Sipek – For service to local government, and to the community.
- Susan Elizabeth Skinner – For service to youth with disability.
- Kevin Slomoi – For service to the Jewish community.
- Margaret Blair Small – For service to nursing.
- Dr Andrea Lynne Smith – For service to community health.
- The late Mr Antony Frederick Smith – For service to oenology.
- Edward Arthur Smith – For service to football.
- Robert James Smith – For service to the community through emergency response welfare organisations.
- Victor Herbert Smith – For service to the community through emergency response organisations.
- Barry Robert Sneddon – For service to sports administration.
- The late Mr Ian Henry Sobbe – For service to palaeontology.
- Dr Wayne John Spring – For service to medicine as a general consultant physician.
- Susan Barbara Springfield – For service to the communities of Mulgrave and Springvale North.
- Clinton John Stanley – For service to people with disability through swimming.
- Yvette Rachel Stanton – For service to embroidery.
- Dr Linton Drew Staples – For service to science, and to pest animal management.
- Cornelis Simon Steenland – For service to youth, and to sailing.
- Dr Sean Colin Stevens – For service to general practice medicine.
- Dr Colin Kenneth Stewart – For service to secondary media education.
- Graeme Lindsay Stockton – For service to conservation and the environment.
- Kevin Harold Stokes – For service to conservation and the environment.
- Colin John Strofield – For service to the law.
- Kathryn Erica Strohm – For service to disability support.
- Peter Joseph Sweeney – For service to hockey.
- Laurie John Sweet – For service to the community of Gwandalan.
- Christopher Robert Symonds – For service to the community of Queensland.
- Gerard Tancred – For service to baseball.
- Kevin Martin Tannebring – For service to sport, particularly softball.
- Kevin John Tant – For service to the game of bridge, and to club administration.
- Kieran John Tapsell – For service to conservation and the environment.
- William Leslie te Kloot – For service to business governance and risk management.
- Chethicad Oommen Thomas – For service to the Indian community of Victoria.
- Margaret Rose Thompson – For service to croquet.
- Geoffrey Ashlen Thompstone – For service to surf lifesaving.
- Rob (Sam) Thomson – For service to youth through pastoral care.
- The late Mr David John Thorpe – For service to the community through a range of roles.
- Therese Majella Tierney – For service to community health in the Gippsland region.
- Enid Daphne Tink – For service to the community of Ravensthorpe.
- David Torevell – For service to surf lifesaving, and to the community.
- Mervyn Stanley Trease – For service to rogaining and orienteering, and to bushland search and rescue.
- Anna Turetschek – For service to gymnastics as a coach and administrator.
- Lynette Gweneth Turner – For service to the community through disaster relief roles.
- Margaret Anne Turner – For service to the community of Batemans Bay.
- Mechelle Ann Turvey – For service to the Indigenous communities of Western Australia.
- Dr Stephen Eric Utick – For service to conservation, and to the community.
- Dr Paul Valent – For service to the Jewish community.
- Cornelis Hendrikus Van den Dungen – For service to motor sports.
- Lois Madge Vanstone – For service to music, and to the community.
- Dr Christopher Johnson Verco, RFD – For service to medicine as an obstetrician.
- Dr Abhishek Kumar Verma – For service to medicine, and to medical administration.
- Matthew Vertzonis, CSM RFD – For service to veterans and their families.
- Evelyn Felicia Vicker – For service to the law.
- Roger Gaul Viney – For service to the community of Hobart.
- Theano (Tina) Viney – For service to the beauty and aesthetics industry.
- Anna Vitenbergs – For service to conservation and the environment.
- Cecile Jane Wake – For service to the energy supply industry, and to education.
- The late Mrs Kathleen Mary Walcott – For service to tennis, and to the community of Goulburn.
- Philip Walker – For service to arts administration, and to philanthropy.
- Darren James Wallace – For service to the community through a range of roles.
- Karen Anne Wallwork – For service to community history.
- Denis John Walsh – For service to the community through social welfare organisations.
- Shane Murray Walsh – For service to the community of Adelong.
- Allan Arthur Ward – For service to the community through music.
- Milton Clarence Ward – For service to the community through music.
- Sarah Ward – For service to the community through social welfare organisations.
- Dr Lachlan John Warren – For service to dermatology.
- Peter Roy Warwick-Mayo – For service to community history.
- John Langley Watsford – For service to the rail transport industry.
- Elizabeth Watson – For service to the environment, and to the Parliament of Western Australia.
- Peter Bruce Watson – For service to the people and Parliament of Western Australia.
- Rodney Reginald Watson – For service to secondary education, and to the community.
- Philip Gregory Webb – For service to the community of Melbourne.
- Robert Wilton Webster – For service to the communities of the Terrey Hills region.
- Keith Raymond Welsh – For service to the performing arts, particularly through music.
- The late Mr Mark Weragoda – For service to the community of Bendigo.
- David Herbert Westlake – For service to the community of Manly-Wynnum.
- Margaret Ann Wheeler – For service to the community of Newcastle.
- Aaron Ronald White – For service to the community of Brighton.
- Peter Allen Whiting – For service to the community of Adelaide.
- Margaret Gayle Whittaker – For service to community health, and to sport.
- Craig Williams – For service to surf lifesaving.
- Dr Mark Alexander Williams – For service to tertiary education.
- Colin Wilson – For service to veterans, and to the community.
- George Bruce Wilson – For service to karate, and to youth.
- The late Mr Ray Joseph Wilton – For service to the community of Melbourne.
- Lilly Anna Wolf – For service to the Jewish community.
- Dr Ann Leslie Wollner – For service to the Jewish community.
- John Archer Woodhouse – For service to the visual arts, particularly photography.
- Dale Malcolm Wright – For service to the community through a range of organisations.
- Dr Celina Ping Yu – For service to business education, and to international trade.
- Man Kit Yu – For service to the community through charitable organisations.
- Robert Stephen Zahara – For service to rowing.
- Professor Shixiang Zhang – For service to music as a violin teacher.
- Carmine Zollo – For service to the community, and to football.
- Dr Bogumila Zongollowicz – For service to the Polish community.

==== Military Division ====
Navy

- Commander Kate Elizabeth Alston, RAN – For meritorious service to the Australian Defence Force in personnel support roles.
- Chief Petty Officer Marcus Nathan Effrett – For meritorious service in the fields of Navy operational seamanship and training.
- Lieutenant Commander Mohab Hanna, RAN – For meritorious performance of duty in the field of maintenance delivery services to the Royal Australian Navy.
- Warrant Officer Bradley Scott Martin – For meritorious service to the Navy in the field of military catering operations.
- Commander David Evan O'Toole, RAN – For meritorious performance of duty in the field of Navy Aviation Operational Policy and Airworthiness.
- Lieutenant Commander Robert Scott Varian, RAN – For meritorious service as a Submarine Acoustic Intelligence Specialist and Intelligence Officer while deployed on Operation VIGILANCE.
- Commander David Anthony Wright, RAN – For meritorious service in the field of Naval Mine Warfare.

Army

- Warrant Officer Class One B – For meritorious service in technical leadership, workforce development and materiel sustainment in the direct support of the Australian Army.
- Warrant Officer Class One Michael William Beeton – For meritorious performance of duty as the Regimental Sergeant Major of the Australian Army Band.
- Warrant Officer Class One Scott Russell Caswell – For meritorious performance of duty as a Master Gunner in the Australian Army.
- Major Andrew Scott Crook – For meritorious performance of duty as a Regimental Sergeant Major and senior enlisted leader in the Australian Army.
- Warrant Officer Class One Wayne Robert Davis – For meritorious performance of duty as an Artificer Sergeant Major and as the Master Artificer Technician Electrical for the Australian Army.
- Major Craig Fairweather – For meritorious service in military engineering for the Australian Army.
- Warrant Officer Class One Adam Boyd Harper – For meritorious performance of duty as a joint movements specialist within the Australian Defence Force.
- Warrant Officer Class One Alison Lee Huber – For meritorious performance of duty in Army People Capability Branch and the Directorate of Australian Defence Force Human Resource Information Systems.
- Warrant Officer Class One David Nutini – For meritorious service to training and capability integration as the Regimental Sergeant Major in the Australian Army over various appointments.
- Warrant Officer Class One Gregg Pierre Orlicki – For meritorious performance of duty as the Regimental Sergeant Major within various units.

Air Force

- Warrant Officer Scott William Atkinson – For meritorious service in the advancement of catering capabilities for the Royal Australian Air Force.
- Flight Lieutenant Tobias David Peach – For meritorious service as a High Frequency Radar and Space Surveillance Subject Matter Expert within the Australian Defence Force.
- Wing Commander Alan Ross Turner – For meritorious service in the development of health capability for the Royal Australian Air Force.

== Meritorious Service ==
=== Public Service Medal (PSM) ===
Public Service Medal ribbon

Federal

- Bradford John Archer – For outstanding public service to public administration and the challenges of climate change.
- Kylie Leigh Barber – For outstanding public service in leadership and strategic influence in safeguarding and preserving government institutions.
- Dr Wayne Andrew Beswick – For outstanding public service in systemic change to government practices and changes aimed at improving outcomes for First Nations people.
- Jamie Crew – For outstanding public service in leadership and driving organisational reform in Commonwealth and state courts and tribunals.
- Simon Duggan – For outstanding public service in delivering policy initiatives in complex government environments.
- Nicola Jane Forbes – For outstanding public service in transformative digital records and privacy initiatives of the Office of the Fair Work Ombudsman.
- Radmila Gill – For outstanding public service in leadership, excellence and integrity in Australian Government grants.
- Nigel John Greenup – For outstanding public service to the protection and preservation of Australia’s unique natural environments, and to the people and communities who depend upon them.
- Dr Jared Greenville – For outstanding public service to the Australian Bureau of Agricultural and Resource Economics and Sciences, and to research and agriculture, economics and food security policy.
- Michael John Hickey – For outstanding public service to youth development, youth safety and protection with the Australian Army Cadets and broader Defence.
- Kassandra May Hobbs – For outstanding public service to the Australian War Memorial’s National Collection.
- Sally Anne Masters – For outstanding public service to the veteran community.
- Bo Robertson – For outstanding public service in reforms and government services to the Australian community
- Achilleas Nicholas Shizas – For outstanding public service in leadership and integrity through the establishment of the Operation Protego Integrity Taskforce.
- Janice Ann Silby – For outstanding public service as South Australian Deputy Commissioner for the Department of Veterans' Affairs.
- Dr Ranjith Subasinghe Arachchige – For outstanding public service to plant biodiversity and to Australia's plant health surveillance.
- Dr Michael Barry Walker – For outstanding public service in transport safety, nationally and internationally.
- Dr Nu Nu Win – For outstanding public service to improving the inclusiveness and diversity of the Australia Public Service.

New South Wales

- Dr Lanny George Chor – For outstanding public service to oral health service delivery in NSW.
- Gareth Paul Collins – For outstanding public service in urban design in NSW.
- The late Felicity Claire Finlayson – For outstanding public service to engineering and transport services in NSW.
- Kiersten Emma Fishburn – For outstanding public service to local government administration and planning reform in NSW.
- Dr Jan Fizzell – For outstanding public service to health in NSW.
- David Charles Glasson – For outstanding public service to the maintenance and conservation of the Pyrmont Bridge in NSW.
- Kenneth David Harrison – For outstanding public service to emergency response and management in NSW.
- Joanne Jarvis – For outstanding public service to education in NSW.
- Veronica Anne Lee – For outstanding public service to NSW and local government in Sydney.
- Andrew Mattes – For outstanding public service to air quality and climate change policy in NSW.
- Kathy Powzun – For outstanding public service to education in NSW.
- Greg Wells – For outstanding public service to government service delivery in NSW.

Victoria

- Jayne Dennis – For outstanding public service in forensic disability
- Maria Marantos – For outstanding public service in gambling harm minimisation and regulatory reform.
- Daniel Joseph O'Kelly – For outstanding public service in child protection and community services reform.
- Dougal John Purcell – For outstanding public service in leadership and reform within Victoria's agriculture sector.
- Elizabeth Fiona Sampson – For outstanding public service in leading land management reforms in Victoria.
- David Sheehan – For outstanding public service in strengthening drinking water safety and public health protection.
- Gina Wadden – For outstanding public service in workforce reform and public sector capability building.
- Associate Professor Andrew Michael Wilson – For outstanding public service in clinical leadership and patient safety.

Queensland

- Craig John Gardner – For outstanding public service in safety, wellbeing, and building capability across road and transport infrastructure for Queensland.
- Associate Professor Helen Irving – For outstanding public service to paediatric health care in Queensland.
- Paul Anthony Walmsley – For outstanding public service to the economic development of rural and regional Queensland.
- Dr Sandy Wilson – For outstanding public service to child protection in Queensland.
- Dalassa Yorkston – For outstanding public service to the Aboriginal and Torres Strait Islander community and local government in Queensland.

Western Australia

- Andrew George Brien – For outstanding public service in reform across local government and community engagement and collaboration.
- Dannielle Lee Hill – For outstanding public service to the Shire of Carnarvon.

South Australia

- Anthony Wayne Champion – For outstanding public service to SA Health in regional South Australia.
- Dianne Mary Simmons – For outstanding public service as a nurse and midwife consultant in perinatal mental health.
- Andrea Jane Smith – For outstanding public service in logistics coordination and operational support within the South Australian Cabinet Office.

=== Australian Police Medal (APM) ===
Australian Police Medal ribbon

Federal

- Superintendent Alexander Middlemiss
- Assistant Commissioner Stephen Thomas Nutt

New South Wales

- Detective Sergeant Lorenda Jayne Barber
- Detective Sergeant Laura Therese Beacroft
- Superintendent Darren William Brand
- Sergeant Sally Louise Cox
- Detective Superintendent Adam Paul Johnson
- Chief Inspector Paul Edwin Martin
- Detective Chief Inspector Terrance Peter O'Neill
- Detective Inspector Nigel Keith Warren

Victoria

- Inspector Paul Stuart Hargreaves
- Detective Inspector Dean James Thomas
- Detective Senior Sergeant Daniel Travaglini
- Commander Mary-Jane Welsh

Queensland

- Senior Sergeant Ritchie Peter Callaghan
- Chief Inspector Tyler Jeanne Crosby
- Chief Superintendent Marcus Edward Hill
- Detective Superintendent George Marchesini
- Senior Sergeant R
- Detective Inspector Lisa Frances Scully
- Sergeant Christopher Paul Sullivan

Western Australia

- Superintendent Jason Mark Beesley
- Senior Sergeant Kal Jane Greenaway
- Commander Levinia Margaret Hugo
- Senior Constable Andrew Barry Seery

South Australia

- Sergeant First Class Silvano Dovi
- Detective Chief Superintendent Catherine Louise Hilliard
- Senior Community Constable First Class Gregory Dean Smith

Tasmania

- Assistant Commissioner Douglas Charles Oosterloo

Northern Territory

- Superintendent Mark Cameron Grieve

=== Australian Fire Service Medal (AFSM) ===
Australian Fire Service Medal ribbon

Federal

- Rodney Joseph Evans

New South Wales

- Garry Ian Bashford, RFD
- Peter Joseph Bennett
- Janelle Margaret Brooks
- Andrew Malcolm Browning
- Assistant Commissioner Victoria Anne Campbell
- Paul Cavalier
- Ian William Dicker
- Michael Arthur Kovacs
- Robert Leslie Lightfoot
- Bruce Williams McGrath
- Peta Alexis Miller
- Leigh Nolan
- Deborah Michelle Sharp

Victoria

- Jason Ross Heffernan
- Peter James Irving
- Aaron Robert Kennedy
- Fiona Jean Macken
- Rodney Grant McErvale
- Peter Arthur Shroder

Queensland

- Justin Shane Francis
- Daren Mallouk
- Stephen Lesley Malone

Western Australia

- Nigel Kenneth Elliott
- Colin Winston James

South Australia

- Russell David Wood
- Michael Aubrey Wouters

Australian Capital Territory

- David John Pennock
- Matthew Nelson Shonk

Northern Territory

- Dianne Tynan

=== Ambulance Service Medal (ASM) ===
Ambulance Service Medal ribbon

New South Wales

- Andrew Mayer

Queensland

- Sandra Leeann Osbourne (Gawn)
- Vanessa Olympia Schafranek
- Krystal Anne Smith

Western Australia

- Deane Michael Coxall
- Karen Anne Hollings

South Australia

- Ian Douglas Debono
- Elizabeth Robyn Noom

Tasmania

- Margaret Ann Chilcott
- Michelle Maree Izard
- Garry Paul White

=== Emergency Services Medal (ESM) ===
Emergency Services Medal ribbon

New South Wales

- Paul Edward Ballard
- David Russell Farmer
- Suzanne Freeman, BM
- Stuart Graeme Harvey
- Kevin John Jones
- David William Rope

Victoria

- Katrina Lucy Antony
- Murray Andrew Colvin
- Mark Peter Daw
- Judith Rae Gledhill

Queensland

- Cindel Chere Richardson
- John Laurence Wallace

South Australia

- Robert Ryan Charlton

Australian Capital Territory

- Patrick John Coffey

=== Australian Corrections Medal (ACM) ===
Australian Corrections Medal ribbon

New South Wales

- Angus Cameron Mackenzie
- Fergal Jude Molloy
- Matthew Smylie
- Amy Sowerby

Victoria

- Roslyn Comitti
- Charlotte Louise Goodin

Queensland

- Julie Yvonne Inglis
- Assistant Commissioner Samantha Claire Newman
- Mark William Spicer

Western Australia

- Carole Ann Ackerley
- Acting Assistant Commissioner John Lovell Hedges
- Fiona Eileen Moriarty

South Australia

- Darren Gordon Hills
- Paul Jack
- Dawn Waldheim (McKenna)

Northern Territory

- Michelle Anne Pennington

== Distinguished and Conspicuous Service ==
=== Bar to the Conspicuous Service Cross (CSC and Bar) ===
Conspicuous Service Cross and Bar ribbon

Army

- Colonel Tracy Merlene Allison, CSC – For outstanding devotion to duty in support of Army members and their families during the management of sensitive and strategic matters.

=== Conspicuous Service Cross (CSC) ===
Conspicuous Service Cross ribbon

Navy

- Captain Bernadette Leon Alexander, RAN – For outstanding achievement in the fields of Navy Capability, Shipbuilding and Sustainment.
- Captain Jorge Mathew McKee, CSM RAN – For outstanding achievement in the application of extraordinary skill and judgement as Commander Combined Task Force 153 from October 2024 to April 2025.
- Captain Christopher Richard Searle, RAN – For outstanding achievement as the Director Navy Strategic Logistics.
- Commander Scott John Squires, RAN – For outstanding devotion to duty in the field of Maritime Operational Health for the Royal Australian Navy.

Army

- Lieutenant Colonel Richard James Adamson – For outstanding achievement in advancing tactical communications and developing warfighting-focused communicators.
- Lieutenant Colonel Suzanne Eileen Albury – For outstanding devotion to duty as Commanding Officer of the 7th Signal Regiment (Electronic Warfare).
- Lieutenant Colonel Brendan Patrick Allen – For outstanding devotion to duty and leadership as Commanding Officer 5th/6th Battalion, Royal Victoria Regiment.
- Lieutenant Colonel Haydn William Barlow – For outstanding achievement in the execution of Australian Army public affairs and strategic communications.
- Major Joshua Simon Clarke – For outstanding achievement in command and space capability development as Officer Commanding Number 74 Squadron.
- Lieutenant Colonel Travis Philip Day – For outstanding achievement as Commanding Officer of the 1st Combat Engineer Regiment.
- Lieutenant Colonel Timothy John Farrell – For outstanding achievement as the lead contingency campaign planner at Headquarters Joint Operations Command.
- Lieutenant Colonel Michael William Finch – For outstanding devotion to duty as Chief Operations Officer, United Nations Disengagement Observer Force whilst deployed on Operation FORTITUDE.
- Colonel G – For outstanding achievement in implementing the Army's contribution to the Government's response to the Defence Strategic Review.
- Lieutenant Colonel David James Hickey – For outstanding devotion to duty as Commanding Officer of the 20th Regiment, Royal Australian Artillery.
- Lieutenant Colonel Jason Peter Long – For outstanding achievement in tactical logistics design and enabling 3rd Brigade’s transformation to an Armoured Formation.
- Lieutenant Colonel Markus Roland Ludwig – For outstanding achievement in support of the Defence People System.
- Lieutenant Colonel Ryan James Mitchell – For outstanding achievement as a senior Staff Officer in Joint Operations Command and Commanding Officer of Task Force 12 on Operation OKRA from January 2023 to November 2024.
- Lieutenant Colonel Glenn Leon Neilson, DSM – For outstanding achievement in the advancement of Army's collective training methodologies and the enhancement of the Australian Army's combat capability.
- Lieutenant Colonel Mark Damien Ripper – For outstanding achievement in the development of Littoral Manoeuvre capabilities in the Australian Army.
- Lieutenant Colonel Justin Robinson – For outstanding achievement in the development of capability in support of homeland defence.
- Colonel Wendy Claire Say – For outstanding devotion to duty as an officer in the Australian Army over various positions.
- Lieutenant Colonel Brooke Idoline Steele – For outstanding achievement as the principal staff officer for logistics within Headquarters 2nd (Australian) Division and Commanding Officer 8th Operational Support Unit.

Air Force

- Wing Commander Wayne Joseph Armstrong – For outstanding devotion to duty in Special Access Program administration, governance and capability development for the Royal Australian Air Force and Australian Defence Force.
- Flight Lieutenant Nicholas Clive Chapman – For outstanding achievement in MQ-4C Triton aircrew training and capability realisation in the Royal Australian Air Force.
- Warrant Officer Stephen William Clark – For outstanding achievement in technical leadership of the P-8A Poseidon maritime patrol capability.
- Squadron Leader Emily Margaret Hartley – For outstanding achievement in C-17A sustainment support for the Royal Australian Air Force.
- Group Captain Terrence John Lewis – For outstanding achievement as the Provost Marshal—Australian Defence Force and Commander Joint Military Police Unit.
- Wing Commander Peter James Mole – For outstanding achievement as the Commanding Officer of Number 114 Mobile Control and Reporting Unit.
- Flight Sergeant Joshua Siegfried Schoeneck – For outstanding achievement in enhancing cyber-security policy, procedures and training to assure E-7A Wedgetail cyberworthiness.

=== Conspicuous Service Medal (CSM) ===
Conspicuous Service Medal ribbon

Navy

- Leading Seaman Luke Anthony Bonanno – For meritorious devotion to duty as the Weapons System Controller on HMAS Waller.
- Chief Petty Officer Michelle Ann Bush – For meritorious achievement as a Physical Training Instructor at the Royal Australian Navy Recruit School.
- Commander Christopher James Ellis, RAN – For meritorious achievement as the Commanding Officer of HMA Submarines Collins, Waller, and Dechaineux.
- Lieutenant Commander David Ross Sinclair, RAN – For meritorious devotion to duty in the capability assurance and upgrade of the Australian Defence Force's fleet of MH-60R Seahawk helicopters.
- Chief Petty Officer Vanessa Jane Toohey – For meritorious devotion to duty as a Supply Chain Specialist supporting the Air Warfare Destroyer Enterprise.

Army

- Major Nicholas Erlwell Aplin – For meritorious achievement in operational planning and force modernisation within Logistics Operations.
- Warrant Officer Class Two Anthony Owen Begnell – For meritorious achievement in the planning and execution of training to convert to the National Advanced Surface-to-Air Missile System.
- Sergeant J – For meritorious achievement in enhancing combat health training across the Australian Army.
- Major Brenton Matthew Chapman – For meritorious achievement as the Officer Commanding 35th Water Transport Squadron and contribution to Project Land 8710 Littoral Manoeuvre Program.
- Lieutenant Colonel Robert Francis Coales – For meritorious achievement as Commanding Officer and Chief Instructor of the Western Australian University Regiment.
- Lieutenant Colonel Timothy James Dawe – For meritorious achievement as Investigations Manager, Unrecovered War Casualties–Army.
- Warrant Officer Class Two Christopher Patrick Fallon – For meritorious devotion to duty as a Works Supervisor at 19th Chief Engineer Works.
- Warrant Officer Class One Sonya Kaye Francis – For meritorious devotion to duty in the fields of logistics management and provision of welfare support at the 1st Combat Engineer Regiment.
- Warrant Officer Class Two Corey Wayne Freckleton – For meritorious devotion to duty as the Manager Operations Offensive Support of the Supporting Arms Coordination Centre for Headquarters Australian Amphibious Force.
- Major Christopher Raymond Grimes – For meritorious devotion to duty as a United Nations Military Observer deployed on Operation PALADIN from January 2024 to January 2025.
- Warrant Officer Class One Scott James Kelly – For meritorious achievement as the Formation Artificer and Acting Formation Logistics Officer of the Land Combat College.
- Warrant Officer Class One Daniel John Leatham – For meritorious achievement as the Regimental Artificer Sergeant Major of the 2nd Cavalry Regiment.
- Warrant Officer Class One M – For meritorious devotion to duty in the field of Human Performance in Special Operations.
- Warrant Officer Class One P – For meritorious devotion to duty in the development, management, and integration of advanced capabilities.
- Warrant Officer Class Two S – For meritorious achievement in training delivery and modernisation of Special Operations offensive fires capability.
- Warrant Officer Class Two Matthew John Solis – For meritorious achievement as the Reconnaissance and Surveillance Section Commander and Platoon Sergeant within the 31st/42nd Battalion, the Royal Queensland Regiment.
- Lieutenant Colonel Pete J. Tarling – For meritorious achievement as the Brigade Major of 10th (Fires) Brigade.
- Lieutenant Colonel Scott David Thomas – For meritorious devotion to duty in providing workforce behaviour analytics to Army’s units, formations and commands.
- Captain Aaron Kenneth Wurfel – For meritorious achievement as the Staff Officer Grade Two National Entry, Combined Joint Theatre Support Component, Joint Operations Command.

Air Force

- Sergeant Lawson David Alick – For meritorious devotion to duty as a Military Recruiter enabling the transformation of the recruiting operating framework within Defence Force Recruiting.
- Squadron Leader Charles Griffiths Goodacre – For meritorious achievement in the development of maritime strike integrated tactical procedures in support of National Defence Strategy objectives.
- Wing Commander Mark Douglas Jobson – For meritorious achievement as Staff Officer Grade One Defence Security Operations Centre.
- Group Captain Mark William Powell – For outstanding achievement and dedication in workforce modelling, simulation and planning to deliver the optimal people element of capability for the Royal Australian Air Force.
- Flight Lieutenant Alexander James Quitzau – For meritorious achievement in the application of exceptional skills, and judgement in air mobility planning for the Australian Defence Force.
- Wing Commander Timothy Ronald Shaw – For meritorious devotion to duty in the training and development of Papua New Guinea’s sovereign aviation capability.
- Flight Lieutenant Stuart Calvin Siebels – For meritorious achievement as commander of an intelligence department within the United Nations Enforcement Coordination Cell, whilst deployed on Operation ARGOS from May to November 2024.
- Warrant Officer Darren Craig Williams – For meritorious achievement in enhancing aircrew protection and survivability through Aeronautical Life Support Equipment leadership within the Australian Defence Force.
- Wing Commander Leigh Wrighton-Jones – For meritorious achievement in capability acquisition, sustainment and test of the F-35 Joint Strike Fighter.
