= Holgate =

Holgate may refer to:

== People with the surname ==
- Christine Holgate, Australian businesswoman
- Sir David John Holgate, English judge
- Edwin Holgate, Canadian artist
- Harry Holgate, Australian politician
- Laura Holgate, American diplomat
- Mason Holgate, English footballer
- Robert Holgate, former Archbishop of York
- Stephen Holgate (rugby league), English rugby league player
- Thomas F. Holgate (1859-1945), American mathematician and academic administrator

== Places ==
- Holgate, New South Wales, a suburb of the Australian Central Coast region
- Holgate, York, a suburb in England
- Holgate, a hamlet in the civil parish of New Forest, North Yorkshire, England
- Holgate, New Jersey, a community in Long Beach Township
- Holgate, Ohio

== Other ==
- Holgate School (disambiguation)
- Holgate (HBC vessel), operated by the HBC in 1916, see Hudson's Bay Company vessels
