= Rebecca Spindler =

Australian zoologist

Rebecca Spindler (born in Melbourne) is an Australian zoologist, researcher, and conservationist. She is the head of science and conservation at non-profit conservation organisation Bush Heritage Australia, and an adjunct professor at the University of New South Wales. She previously worked with the Taronga Conservation Society and was the manager of research and conservation at Taronga Zoo in Sydney.

Her research has focused on animal reproduction and has contributed to improved health and conservation of animals including giant pandas in China and jaguars in the Amazon. She established the Taronga Green Grants program to support community conservation projects.

== Early life and education ==
Spindler completed a PhD on marsupial reproduction at the University of Melbourne in 1997.

== Career ==
After completing her doctorate, Spindler left Australia for 10 years, working at the Smithsonian Institution in the United States and at the Toronto Zoo in Canada. She worked at the Smithsonian Conservation Biology Institute, where she managed a laboratory and integrated reproduction, her own area of expertise with other disciplines of science to conserve species. She spent five giant panda breeding seasons in the Wolong Nature Reserve, coordinating the Smithsonian's Giant Panda and Wild China Programmes. During this same period she established the Neotropical Carnivore Initiative and with colleagues throughout the Americas, embarking on a multidisciplinary program aimed at improving the health, reproduction and conservation of jaguars.

In 2007, she joined the team at Taronga as manager of research and conservation, coordinating and facilitating the research of the zoo science team investigating wildlife health, ecology, behaviour, reproduction, genetics and nutrition. Spindler also helped Taronga protect species and their habitats through the Taronga Field Conservation Grants.

Spindler was appointed a Member of the Order of Australia in the 2026 King's Birthday Honours in recognition of her "significant service to conservation science, to wildlife reproduction research, and to biodiversity protection".

== Publications ==
=== Peer-reviewed papers ===
- Spindler, R.E.; Renfree, M.B.; Gardner, D.K. (1996). "Carbohydrate uptake by quiescent and reactivating mouse blastocysts". Journal of Experimental Zoology. 276 (2): 132–137. doi:10.1002/(SICI)1097-010X(19961001)276:2<132::AID-JEZ6>3.0.CO;2-P.
- Spindler, R.E.; Renfree, M.B.; Shaw, G.; Gardner, D.K. (1998). "Reactivating tammar wallaby blastocysts oxidise glucose". Biology of Reproduction. 58 (6): 1425–1431. doi:10.1095/biolreprod58.6.1425.
- Spindler, R.E.; Wildt, D.E. (1999). "Circannual variations in intraovarian oocyte but not epididymal sperm quality in the domestic cat". Biology of Reproduction. 61 (1): 188–194. doi:10.1095/biolreprod61.1.188.
- Spindler, R.E.; Pukazhenthi, B.; Wildt, D.E. (2000). "Oocyte metabolism predicts the development of cat embryos to blastocyst in vitro". Molecular Reproduction and Development. 56 (2): 163–171. doi:10.1002/(SICI)1098-2795(200006)56:2<163::AID-MRD7>3.0.CO;2-3.
- Spindler, R.E.; Wildt, D.E. (2002). "Quality and age of companion felid embryos modulate enhanced development by group culture". Biology of Reproduction. 66 (1): 167–73. doi:10.1095/biolreprod66.1.167.
- Pukazhenthi, B.; Spindler, R.; Wildt, D.E.; Bush, L.M.; Howard, J.G. (2002). "Osmotic properties of spermatozoa from felids producing different proportions of pleiomorphisms: Influence of adding and removing cryoprotectant". Cryobiology. 44 (3): 288–300. doi:10.1016/S0011-2240(02)00035-4.
- Spindler, R.E.; Huang, Y.; Howard, J.G.; Wang, P.; Zhang, H.; Zhang, G.; Wildt, D.E. (2004). "Acrosomal integrity and capacitation are not influenced by sperm cryopreservation in the giant panda". Reproduction. 127 (5): 547–556. doi:10.1530/rep.1.00034.
- Spindler, R.E.; Crichton, E.G.; Agca, Y.; Loskutoff, N.; Critser, J.; Gardner, D.K.; Wildt, D.E. (2006). "Improved felid embryo development by group culture is maintained with heterospecific companions". Theriogenology. 66 (1): 82–92. doi:10.1016/j.theriogenology.2006.03.021.
- Pukazhenthi, B.; Laroe, D.; Crosier, A.; Bush, L.M.; Spindler, R.; Pelican, K.; Bush, M.; Howard, J.G.; Wildt, D.E. (2006). "Challenges in cryopreservation of clouded leopard (Neofelis nebulosa) spermatozoa". Theriogenology. 66 (6–7): 1790–1796. doi:10.1016/j.theriogenology.2006.02.020.
- Spindler, R.E.; Huang, Y.; Howard, J.G.; Wang, P.; Zhang, H.; Zhang, G.; Wildt, D.E. (2006). "Giant panda sperm decondensation is not influenced by cryopreservation". Reproduction, Fertility and Development. 18 (7): 767–775. doi:10.1071/RD06030.
- Hagedorn, M.; van Oppen, M.J.; Carter, V.; Henley, M.; Abrego, D.; Puill-Stephan, E.; Negri, A.; Heyward, A.; MacFarlane, D.; Spindler, R. (2012). "First frozen repository for the Great Barrier Reef coral created". Cryobiology. 65 (2): 157–158. doi:10.1016/j.cryobiol.2012.05.008.

=== Book chapters ===
- Spindler, R. E.; Songsasen, N.; Deem, S.L. (2007). "Factors affecting the reproductive success of jaguars". In Morato, RG; Rodrigues, FHG; Eizirik, E; Mangini, PR; Azavedo, FCC; Marinho-Filho, J (eds.). Manejo e Conservação de Carnivoros Neotropicais. Instituto Brasileiro do Meio Ambiente e dos Recursos Naturais Renováveis (IBAMA). pp. 281–304. ISBN 978-8573002447.
- Spindler, R. E.; Wildt, D.E. (2010). "Male reproduction: assessment, management, assisted breeding and fertility control". In Kleiman, D.G.; Thompson, K.V.; Lumpkin, S. (eds.). Wild Mammals in Captivity (2nd ed.). University of Chicago Press. ISBN 978-0226440101.
- Spindler, R. E.; Wiszniewski, J.; Slip, D. (2012). "The Potential Role of Zoos in Climate Change". In Lunney, D.; Hutchins, P. (eds.). Wildlife and Climate Change. Royal Zoological Society of New South Wales. doi:10.7882/9780980327250. ISBN 978-0-9803272-6-7.
- Spindler, R. E.; Wiszniewski, J. (2013). "Research in Zoos". In Irwin, M.D.; Stoner, J.B.; Cobaugh, AM (eds.). Zoo Keeping: An Introduction to the Science and Technology. University of Chicago Press. pp. 544–554. ISBN 978-0226925325.
- Spindler, R. E.; Keeley, T.; Satake, N. (2014). "Applied Andrology in Endangered, Exotic and Wildlife Species". In Chenoweth, P.; Lorton, S. (eds.). Animal Andrology: Theories and Applications. CABI publishing. pp. 450–473. ISBN 978-1780643168.
