= Wei Yan (biologist) =

Chinese-American reproductive biologist

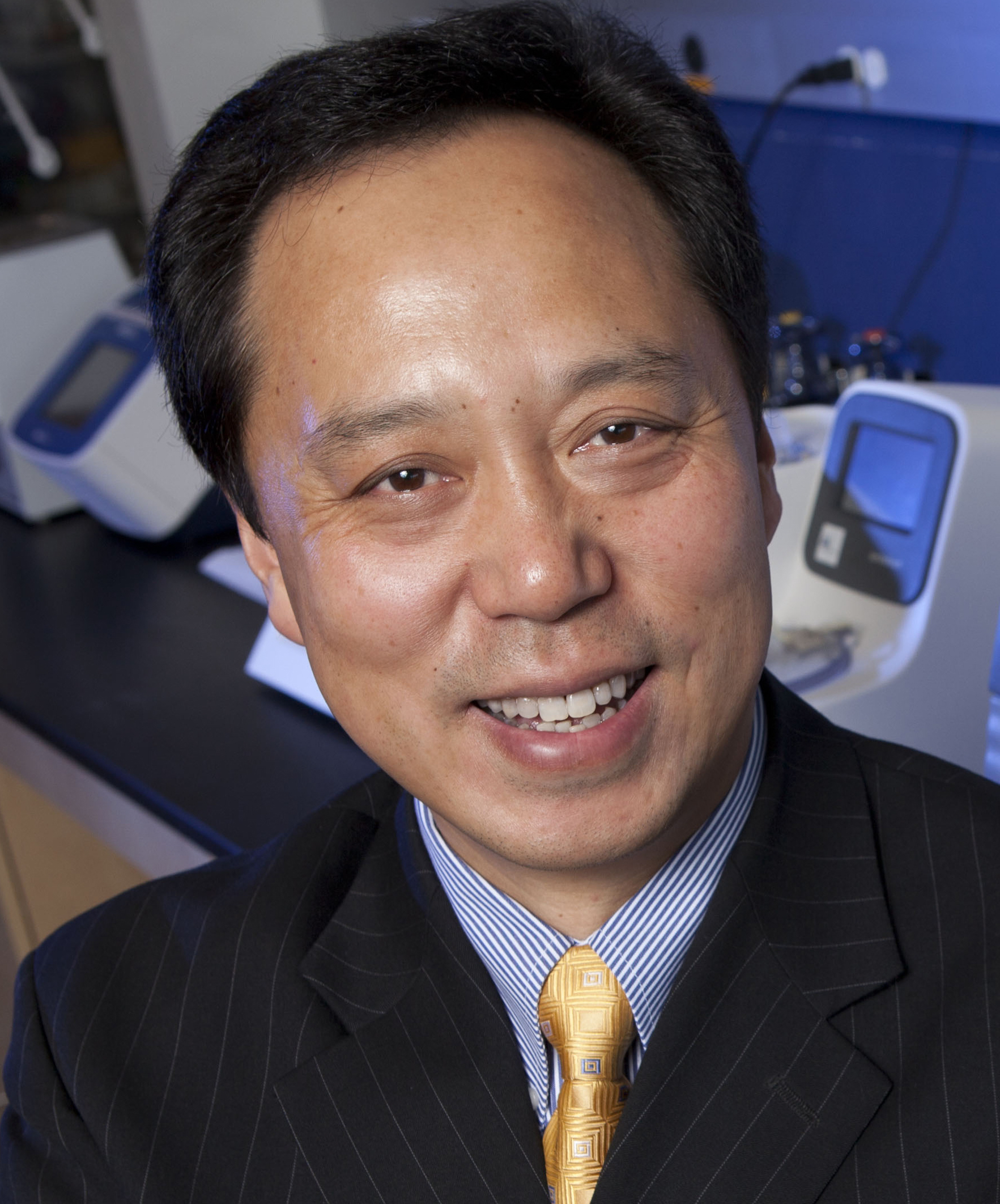
- Born: Wei Yan; Liaoning, China
- Education: China Medical University (MD); University of Turku (PhD); Baylor College of Medicine (Post-doc)
- Known for: Discovering mechanisms that control sperm production; Small RNA; Male contraceptive
- Scientific career
- Fields: Biologist; Reproduction; RNA biology Gene editing
- Workplaces: Baylor College of Medicine; University of Nevada, Reno School of Medicine; David Geffen School of Medicine at UCLA; Washington State University
- Doctoral advisor: Jorma Toppari
- Website: weiyanlab.com

Wei Yan is a Chinese-American reproductive biologist who currently serves as the Director of the School of Molecular Biosciences and the Center for Reproductive Biology at Washington State University's College of Veterinary Medicine. He is also a University Foundation Professor at the University of Nevada, Reno and an Elected Fellow of the American Association for the Advancement of Science. In addition, he directs the National Center for Male Reproductive Epigenomics. Previously, Dr. Yan served as the Editor-in-Chief of the journal Biology of Reproduction and he currently holds the position of Deputy Editor of Andrology.

== Biography ==
Wei Yan was born in Liaoning, China. He received his MD from China Medical University in 1990 and PhD from University of Turku, Finland in 2000. He completed his post-doc training at Baylor College of Medicine, Houston, TX in 2004. He began his independent career as an assistant professor at the University of Nevada, Reno School of Medicine (UNR Med) in 2004. He rose through the ranks and became a full professor in 2013. He is currently Principal Investigator at The Lundquist Institute at Harbor-UCLA Medical Center and professor of medicine at David Geffen School of Medicine at UCLA. His research interests include genetic and epigenetic control of fertility, as well as epigenetic contribution of gametes (sperm and eggs) to fertilization, early embryonic development and adulthood health. As a principal investigator, Dr. Yan has been continuously funded by grants from the NIH and various foundations, with a total of ~$17 million in direct cost. He also so far published >165 peer-reviewed research articles and book chapters in high-impact journals with >15,000 citations and a h-index of 71.

== Career and Research ==
After receiving his M.D., Dr. Yan became the Chief Examiner at the Coroner's Office of the Institute of Forensic Science of Liaoning Province, Shenyang, China. While he enjoyed his work as an Examiner, developing advanced techniques for DNA extraction from crime scene samples, he became increasingly fascinated with the research aspect. Motivated by this new interest, Dr. Yan pursued graduate studies in the Department of Forensic Medicine at China Medical University while continuing his work at the coroner's office. The following year, he left China to serve as a visiting scholar in the Department of Medical Genetics, at the University of Turku, Finland. He remained at the University of Turku to complete his Ph.D. in March 2000 under the mentorship of Drs. Jorma Toppari, Ilpo Hutaniemi and Martti Parvinen. After a brief postdoctoral appointment in Turku, he moved to the United States to join Dr. Martin M. Matzuk's lab in the Department of Pathology at Baylor College of Medicine in Houston, Texas. There, he received his first faculty appointment as an Instructor in the Department of Pathology in 2003. In 2004, Dr. Yan was appointed as a tenure-track Assistant Professorship in the Department of Physiology and Cell Biology at the University of Nevada School of Medicine in Reno Nevada. During his tenure at UNR, he became an exceptionally productive researcher, earning numerous awards and rising through the academic ranks to achieve the highest honor bestowed upon Professors; The University of Nevada, Reno Foundation Professor in 2020. During this time, he also served as the Editor-in-Chief of Biology or Reproduction, the official journal of the Society for the Study of Reproduction (SSR). Having achieved the highest honor at UNR, Dr. Yan would still go on to seek more challenges and moved to Los Angeles, where he joined the David Geffen School of Medicine at UCLA as well as a Professor of Medicine and took on a Senior Investigator position at The Lundquist Institute for Biomedical Innovation at Harbor-UCLA Medical Center in Torrance, California. While at The Lundquist Institute, Dr. Yan's exceptional contributions to research and leadership were recognized with the Frank DeSantis Senior Investigator Award. In 2025, Dr. Yan assumed his current position as Director of the School of Molecular Biosciences and the Center for Reproductive Biology at Washington State University College of Veterinary Medicine. That same year, he was elected into the Washington State Academy of Sciences (WSAS) in recognition of his outstanding scientific achievements, as well as his commitment to advancing evidence-based policy in Washington State.

Over his almost 30 years of research, Dr. Yan has made significant contributions to the field of Reproductive Biology and Epigenetic Inheritance in the following five areas:

=== Non-hormonal male contraceptives ===
Dr. Yan has been innovative in the contraceptives field with the novel idea of developing non-hormonal male contraceptives that disable sperm rather than killing them. His lab first put forward a novel idea for the development of non-hormonal male contraceptives: "Do not kill, but disable sperm", which led to the discovery of TRIPTONIDE, a natural compound purified from the Chinese herb Tripterygium Wilfordii Hook F. Triptonide acts as a reversible non-hormonal contraceptive agent in mice and monkeys, and established it as a drug candidate for "The Pill" for men. This is the first and ONLY compound discovered in the past fifty years that has been tested on mice and monkeys and found to be efficient, reversible and safe.

=== Research on cellular and molecular mechanisms that control sperm production and male fertility ===
Dr. Yan's lab first discovered the function of motile cilia in the reproductive tracts. In the male, motile ciliary beating functions as an agitator to maintain the constant suspension of immotile testicular sperm during their transit through the efferent ductules in men. This work led to a novel concept that efferent ductal obstructions due to motile ciliopathy represent a new cause of male infertility, which has been validated in clinics. This discovery has changed clinical practice in the diagnosis and treatment of obstructive azoospermia and idiopathic male infertility. In the female, motile cilia in the oviduct/Fallopian tube are essential for oocyte pickup and, therefore, fertility, but dispensable for embryo and sperm transport, which are mostly achieved through smooth muscle contraction. This work solved the long-standing controversy about the role of cilia beating vs. muscle contraction in gamete/embryo transport.

Additionally, using a variety of gene knockout/genome editing technologies, his lab discovered many genetic networks that control the most fundamental cellular and molecular events in spermatogenesis, e.g., sperm connecting piece formation, cytoplasmic removal, global shortening of 3'UTRs, and delayed translation/uncoupling of transcription and translation, and dynamic changes in poly(A) length and non-A contents.

=== Discovery of novel small RNA species and their function in germ cells ===
As a young scientist, Dr. Yan was the first to discover mitochondrial genome-encoded small RNAs (mitosRNAs) and endo-siRNAs in the male germline, as well as meiotic sex chromosome inactivation (MSCI)-escaping X-linked miRNAs and elucidated the functions of all during reproduction.

=== Transgenerational Epigenetic Inheritance ===
Based on his work on sperm-borne small RNAs, he put forward a novel hypothesis regarding the potential role of gamete small RNAs in epigenetic inheritance. His study on the Kit paramutation mouse model first discovered that outcrossing promotes the correction of epimutations through epigenetic reprogramming, whereas intercrossing stabilizes the epimutations and enhances their transmission across multiple generations. Based on the accumulating data on inter- or trans-generational epigenetic inheritance, he and colleagues have come up with several inspiring hypotheses regarding the role of sperm small RNAs and their modifications in mediating epigenetic inheritance. He established the first-ever National Center for Male Reproductive Epigenomics, which is funded by an NCTRI P50 grant from the NICHD with a research focus on the molecular mechanism underlying epigenetic inheritance of lifestyle-induced metabolic syndrome in both humans and mice.

=== Awards and Publications ===
Dr. Yan has published >165 research articles, reviews, and book chapters, which have garnered >15,000 citations with h-index at 70 as of February 2026 according to Google Scholar. His work has appeared in high-impact journals, including Nature Genetics, Nature Cell Biology, Nature Reviews Genetics, Nature Communications, PNAS, Cell Research, Developmental Cell, Genome Biology, EMBO, and Development.

Dr. Wei Yan's research excellence has been recognized with numerous prestigious awards, including the 2009 Society for the Study of Reproduction (SSR) Young Investigator Award, the 2012 American Society of Andrology (ASA) Young Andrologist Award, the 2013 Nevada Healthcare Hero Award for Research and Technology, the 2017 University of Nevada, Reno Outstanding Researcher Award, the 2018 SSR Research Award, the 2020 Nevada System of Higher Education Regents' Research Award (mid-career), the 2023 SSR Distinguished Fellow recognition, and the 2025 Distinguished Andrologist Award.

Dr. Yan was also named a University of Nevada, Reno Foundation Professor in 2016, the highest honor the university bestows upon its faculty, and elected as a Fellow of the American Association for the Advancement of Science (AAAS) in 2017. In 2025, he was elected into the Washington State Academy of Sciences (WSAS).

=== Service and Leadership ===
Over the past 16 years, he has mentored six junior faculty members, trained 16 postdoctoral fellows, and 27 graduate students, contributing to the development of the next generation of scientists.

Dr. Yan has contributed extensively to scientific societies and editorial boards. For the Society for the Study of Reproduction (SSR, he served on the Program Committee (2007, 2014, and 2016), the Awards Committee (2015-2018), and the Biology of Reproduction (BOR) Board of Reviewing Editors (2009-2013). He further held positions as BOR Associate Editor (2013-2017) and Co-Editor-in-Chief of BOR (2017-2021). In the American Society of Andrology (ASA), Dr. Yan was an active member of the Program Committee (2010-2014) and Nominating Committee (2012-2014), co-chaired the 2019 ASA annual meeting, and currently servers on the Board of Directors of ASA (2022-2025)

Dr. Yan currently also serves as a Senior Editor of eLife (2022–present) and the Deputy Editor-in-Chief of Andrology (2024-2028), the official journal of the American Society of Andrology (ASA) and the European Academy of Andrology (EAA). Dr. Yan also serves on the Executive Committee of the North America Testis Workshop (NATW) and chaired the XXVI NATW in 2022.

== Awards and affiliations ==
Some of his awards include:

- 2009 Society for the Study of Reproduction (SSR) Young Investigator Award
- 2012 American Society of Andrology (ASA) Young Andrologist Award
- 2013 Nevada Healthcare Hero Award for Research and Technology
- 2017 University of Nevada, Reno Outstanding Researcher Award
- 2018 SSR Research Award and the 2020 Nevada System of Higher Education Research Award
- 2024 The Lundquist Institute Frank DeSantis Senior Investigator Award
- 2025 American Society of Andrology (ASA) Distinguished Andrologist Award

He was elected Fellow of the American Association for the Advancement of Science (AAAS) in 2017.

He was elected into the Washington State Academy of Sciences (WSAS) in 2025.
