= Christine Holgate =

British-Australian businesswoman

Christine Holgate AM
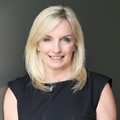
- Born: 1963 or 1964 (age 62–63); Cheshire, England, United Kingdom
- Education: University of North London
- Occupation: Businesswoman
- Title: CEO of Team Global Express
- Spouse: Michael Harding

Christine Holgate (born 1963/1964) is a British-Australian business executive who is the chief executive of Team Global Express, having held similar roles at Australia Post and Blackmores. She was the first woman to be named as the "CEO of the Year" by CEO Magazine, in 2015.

She came to media attention in 2020, while at Australia Post, for having purchased four Cartier watches worth A$20,000, equivalent to A$21,929 in 2022, for senior management executives. After being grilled by a Senate committee and being pressured into resigning by prime minister of Australia Scott Morrison, an independent investigation later reported that she had done nothing wrong.

== Early life and education ==
Christine Holgate was born in 1964 or 1965 in England. She grew up with her four siblings, in Cheshire, England. Holgate's father was an entrepreneur and ran a construction company. From when she was young, her father insisted that she run “little businesses” to earn her pocket money. When Holgate was 15, she cleaned windows with a friend and had a van selling ice-creams.

By the time Holgate turned 18 in 1982, she left Cheshire for London. In London, Holgate met Florence Knight, who financially supported her to pursue a business degree at the University of North London. Holgate has three post-graduate diplomas in management, marketing, and purchasing and supply. She gained her diploma in management in 1986 and completed her Master of Business Administration degree in 1991.

== Career ==
=== Early career ===
Holgate first worked as postwoman for the Christmas season when she was 18. After graduating from university, she worked for Allied Healthcare and BBC News. In 1988, she joined the telecommunication company Cable & Wireless and started her international career. During her 12 years at Cable & Wireless, Holgate directed the company’s marketing department, and conducted projects across Caribbean, Europe and Hong Kong. In 2000, Holgate joined J.P. Morgan as the "Managing Director of Marketing" of its European subsidiary. She was the only woman in J.P. Morgan's executive team in Europe during her incumbent period. Holgate worked for J.P. Morgan for 18 months before joining telecommunications company Energis in May 2001, as the Group Director of Strategy and Marketing. Her job was to lead the Energis strategy and planning teams in Europe, and monitor its marketing activities.

In November 2002, Holgate received a job invitation from David Thodey, the group managing director of Telstra Mobiles, and became the marketing director. While she continued to lead its marketing team, Holgate's role was expanded into building Telstra's business sales and managing the operations of its channels.

=== Blackmores ===
In 2008, Holgate left Telstra to join health supplements company Blackmores as chief executive officer and managing director. Her sister's death from cancer spurred her to join the company.

Within her first two months, Holgate identified that Blackmores operations in Malaysia, Thailand and Taiwan were neglected. In 2009, she appointed Peter Osborne to direct Blackmores business in Asia and minimise the entry barriers. Osborne had worked in Asia for more than 20 years before his appointment. From 2008 to April 2012, Holgate increased Blackmores' annual sales to $234 million. The company increased its profits from the Thai and Malaysian markets, and prepared to enter the Chinese market. The profits from the Asian market accounted for nearly 25% of Blackmores' profits.

In 2011, Holgate was confronted by a crisis related to a deal between Blackmores and The Pharmacy Guild of Australia. Under the deal, pharmacists "would be prompted to promote" Blackmores health supplements to their patients during the prescription process. The proposal of Blackmores caused "national outrage" and the "strong level of public concern". Holgate was criticised for referring the deal as a "Coke and fries" option. She explained the phrase was quoted out of context, having said that the proposal "would add the "Coke and fries" to the prescribed medication, and provide pharmacies with a "new and important revenue stream". She conceded that linking medicine with junk food "was highly unfortunate".

In 2014, Holgate was one of the only 20 business leaders invited to that year's 2014 G20 Brisbane summit. To help increase sales of Blackmores in the Chinese market, she was photographed with the president of China Xi Jinping and Australian prime minister Tony Abbott. At that time, Blackmores' Chinese sales were under $1 million, while the required capital for labour and marketing was around $10 million. Her picture with the two leaders was widely circulated in China and helped attract local consumers. At the end of 2014–15, Blackmores sales in the Chinese market increased to $50 million and they reached $500 million in 2015–16. In September 2015, Blackmores joined the ASX200 index, comprising the top 200 most prominent companies in Australia, and Christine Holgate was named the first female CEO of the Year in November.

During Holgate’s nine years at Blackmores, its share price rose from $18 to $90 and peaked at $220 in 2016. Holgate had transformed Blackmores, a member of the Council for Responsible Nutrition (CRN), into the major health supplement exporter to Asia.

=== Australia Post ===
Holgate resigned from Blackmores in 2017 to become CEO of Australia Post, the first woman in that role. Her appointment came as Australia Post began to position itself as the leading Australian e-commerce postal delivery service. Her job was to manage the modernisation of Australia Post’s logistics system and its 33,000 workforce. Holgate had no previous experience in managing logistics systems. Her appointment was partly based on her strategic ability to exploit the potentials in the Asian markets and enhance the business profitability. She also had direct experience as a Christmas postal worker while a student in North London.

Holgate visited branches across Australia to meet postal employees and noticed the scepticism of the workforce. Before her arrival, Australia Post had divided its business into two product lines, the profitable transport and logistics operation StarTrack and the traditional postal service. After consulting staff, Holgate received agreement to unify the two businesses, which was done preserving traditional red livery and name Australia Post.

In 2018, Holgate launched the "Everyone Matters" promotion, an advertising campaign supporting postal workers and post offices in regional areas. The net promoter score increased over 30 percent in six months. She also tackled the trust problems of employees and launched an "equal pay for equal work" campaign. She invested $300 million to upgrade parcel processing systems using automation and tracking devices. She restructured the Australia Post's executive team to align with her customer-oriented and Asian-focused strategies.

During the COVID-19 pandemic, Holgate had to deal with a number of problems at Australia Post, including significant delays and cuts in service, allegations of the intrusive surveillance of staff, the planned payment of executive bonuses at a time when public servants were expected to take pay cuts, a bipartisan Senate committee accusing Holgate of attempting to avoid parliamentary scrutiny of Australia Post, and Holgate's personal intervention in the attempted delivery of Pauline Hanson's One Nation-branded stubby holders to locked-down public housing towers in Melbourne after Hanson made inflammatory comments about tower residents.

Further controversy arose when Holgate revealed at an appearance before a Senate committee on 22 October 2020 that Australia Post had purchased four Cartier watches in total worth A$20,000, equivalent to A$21,929 in 2022, as gifts for senior management executives who secured a lucrative deal with three Australian banks. Communications minister Paul Fletcher announced an investigation into Australia Post and asked Holgate to step aside as CEO. During question time in the House of Representatives that day, Prime Minister Scott Morrison said that if Holgate wished not to stand aside then she could go. On 2 November 2020, she offered her resignation, stating that she would not seek financial compensation. A subsequent report by law firm Maddocks, commissioned by the government, found that no specific policy that would support provision of Cartier watches had been identified, and that there was no evidence of fraud or corruption.

=== Toll ===
In May 2021, Holgate was appointed CEO of Team Global Express.

== Other roles and memberships ==
Holgate is or was an inaugural chair of the board of the Australia–ASEAN Council. She was one of 20 business leaders invited to the 2014 G20 Brisbane summit.

As of 2024 Holgate is a board member of the Collingwood Football Club.

== Awards and recognition ==
In 2011, Holgate won a Chief Executive Women scholarship and attended the Women's Leadership Forum at the Harvard Business School.

In 2015, Holgate won the "Women in Leadership" award at the Australian Growth Company Awards.

In October 2015, Holgate was named one of the "100 Women of Influence" in Australia by the Australian Financial Review.

In November 2015, Holgate was awarded "Australian CEO of the Year" by The CEO Magazine, the first woman to win the award. In 2016, Holgate was runner-up in the Australian CEO of the Year award.

In 2019, Holgate received the Sir Charles McGrath award from the Australian Marketing Institute.

She was appointed a Member of the Order of Australia in the 2026 King's Birthday Honours in recognition of her "significant service to business through a range of executive roles".

== Personal life ==
In January 2016, Holgate married Michael Harding, the chairman of the Downer Group, in Aldeburgh, England. She has a close relationship with her nephews Brian and Eddie, the sons of Holgate's late sister, Elizabeth, which was the reason for the wedding being held in England.
