= Greg J. Bamber =

British-Australian academic, researcher & writer

Greg Bamber is a British-Australian academic, researcher and writer. He is a professor at the Department of Management, Monash University, Melbourne, Australia. He is also Co-Director, International Consortium for Research in Employment & Work (iCREW), Centre for Global Business, Monash Business School.

== Early life and education ==
Bamber was born near Kingston upon Thames, Greater London, in the United Kingdom (UK). His parents were Douglas Bamber (1921–91) and Elizabeth Bamber (née Dawson, 1922-2009). They had English, Irish and Scottish ancestry and among other jobs, both worked as teachers. Bamber attended several schools in Surrey and Cheshire, UK and also for a year in Massachusetts, USA. His post-school education was in the UK at the University of Manchester, the London School of Economics and Heriot-Watt University, Edinburgh.

== Career ==
In his early career, Bamber worked on research projects based at several UK universities (Imperial College, London; Oxford University; and Warwick University), in industry, at the UK Government’s former Commission on Industrial Relations and as an arbitrator with its successor, the Advisory, Conciliation and Arbitration Service.

He has helped to lead many competitive grant-funded research projects funded by the Australian Research Council and the UK Economic and Social Research Council. International agencies and enterprises have commissioned Bamber to conduct research projects and act as an advisor on human resources and industrial relations. He has been a visitor at Harvard University and Massachusetts Institute of Technology in the US, as well as Cardiff University, Wales; he is Visiting Professor, Newcastle University, England.

== Contributions ==
Some of Bamber’s writing is controversial. He argues in favour of employee engagement in workplace decisions. In an influential book on airlines, he and his colleagues show that this is an effective strategy, for instance, when managing organizational change. They point to such successful instances as Southwest Airlines in the US and EasyJet in the UK. However, others reject such arguments and promote instead a tougher more autocratic and adversarial approach to managing organizational change, pointing to the way in which Ryanair changed civil aviation in Ireland and Europe and Rupert Murdoch's News Corporation changed newspaper publishing in Australia, the UK and the USA.

His contributions to the fields of comparative management and employment relations are well regarded. The book by him and colleagues that was first published in 1987 is seen as "the standard work", which is used around the world on University courses on International and Comparative Employment Relations.

== Expert comment ==
Bamber is recognised as an expert in the fields of management, human resources and industrial relations in aviation, health care, manufacturing and other sectors. He is a regular commentator in the electronic and printed mass media, especially in Australia and also in the UK.

== Honours and recognition ==
Bamber has served as President of Australia and New Zealand Academy of Management (ANZAM), International Federation of Scholarly Associations of Management, Industrial Relations Society of Victoria (Australia) and the Association of Industrial Relations Academics of Australia & New Zealand. He has served as a Director on several boards in the fields of education, healthcare, industrial relations and sport, as well as on more than 20 editorial boards for international journals.

In 2012 Bamber was awarded the esteemed title of Academician (Fellow) of the Academy of Social Sciences (AcSS) UK.

"Professor Bamber's inclusion in this elite group of academics is testament to his excellence in the field of research and academia. Professor Bamber also has a wonderful ability to communicate his knowledge to the wider community via both mainstream and specialist media. It is this communication skill that will assist in his promotion of his work and that of the wider Monash research community." Monash University's President and Vice-Chancellor Professor Ed Byrne

Bamber was appointed a Member of the Order of Australia in the 2026 King's Birthday Honours in recognition of his "significant service to tertiary education, and to international industrial relations research".

== Selected publications ==
- With Van Gramberg, B., Teicher. J. & Cooper, B., 2014, 'Conflict Management in Australian Workplaces', in W. Roche, P. Teague & A. Colvin (eds) Oxford Handbook of Conflict Management in Organizations.
- With Townsend, K., Wilkinson, A., & Allan, C., 2012, 'Accidental, Unprepared and Unsupported: Clinical Nurses Becoming Managers’. International Journal of Human Resource Management.
- With Lansbury, R.D., Wailes, N. & Wright, C.F. (eds) 2016, International and Comparative Employment Relations: National Regulation, Global Changes* 6th edn, Sage, London.
- With Gittell, J.H, Kochan, T.A. & von Nordenflytch, A., 2009, Up in the Air: How Airlines Can Improve Performance by Engaging their Employees, Cornell University Press, Ithaca.
