= Carolyn Oldham =

Australian environmental scientist

- Education: University of Western Australia (PhD)
- Occupation: Engineer
- Employer: University of Western Australia
- Known for: Environmental science and ecotoxicity
- Title: Emeritus Professor

Carolyn Elizabeth Oldham, better known as Carolyn Oldham, is an Australian environmental water scientist and academic. She is an emeritus professor at the University of Western Australia (UWA), who was appointed a Member of the Order of Australia in the 2026 King's Birthday Honours for her "significant service to tertiary education, and to environmental and water science".

== Education ==
Oldham received a Bachelor of Science with Honours in Chemistry in 1984 and then lived for two years in Ladakh, Northern India. She then returned to Australia and completed a PhD from the University of Western Australia, in 1993, examining the impacts of turbulence on oxygen patchiness in lakes.

== Career ==
Oldham was a professor of Environmental Science and Engineering, speciaising in ecotoxicology, ecohydrology, water and water quality, at the University of Western Australia. She led a research group which researched aquatic pollution in Western Australia, and research interests include the microbiomes of acidic and hypersaline water as well as the evolution fo water quality, hydrodynamics, and aquatic ecology of lakes.

Oldham has worked on various engineering and water sanitation projects across Indonesia, Timor-Leste and the Cook Islands, including AusAID projects aimed on improving water quality, water sanitation and engineering.

Oldham has a passion for social justice, and teaching undergraduate engineering students how to apply social justice in their careers. She was also involved in gender equity at UWA, serving as the university's SAGE Athena Swan Lead from 2015 to 2017 and 2019 to 2020.

== Publications ==
Oldham has published various articles on the topic of ecotoxicology, hydrology, and environmental science including in Nature Ecology and Evolution, on First Nations knowledge around termite circles in Western Australia, known as 'fairy circles'. Her H index is 35 and she has over 3900 citations. Select publications include:

- Oldham, C. E., Farrow, D. E., and Peiffer, S.: A generalized Damköhler number for classifying material processing in hydrological systems, Hydrol. Earth Syst. Sci., 17, 1133–1148, https://doi.org/10.5194/hess-17-1133-2013, 2013.
- Krasnostein, A. L., and C. E. Oldham (2004), Predicting wetland water storage, Water Resour. Res., 40, W10203, doi:10.1029/2003WR002899.
- Vilas MP, Marti CL, Adams MP, Oldham CE and Hipsey MR (2017) Invasive Macrophytes Control the Spatial and Temporal Patterns of Temperature and Dissolved Oxygen in a Shallow Lake: A Proposed Feedback Mechanism of Macrophyte Loss. Front. Plant Sci. 8:2097. doi: 10.3389/fpls.2017.02097

She has also co-written a book called Engineers Engaging Community, published by Springer International.

== Awards ==
- 2026 - Order of Australia.
- 2010 - Australian Learning and Teaching Award.4
