= Richard Dowell =

Australian audiologist and researcher

Richard Dowell AO
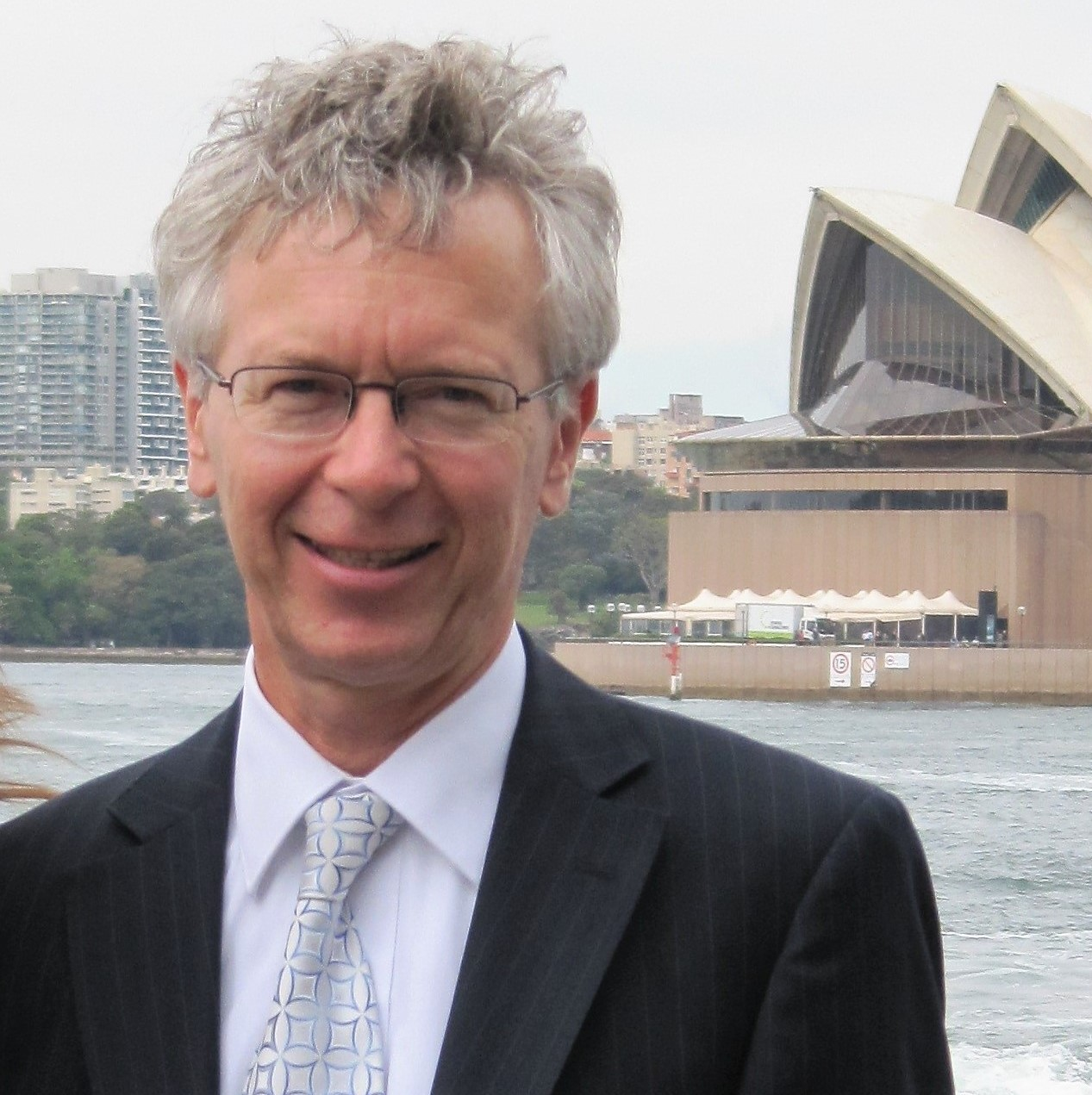
- Born: 31 August 1957 (age 69); Australia
- Occupations: Audiologist, academic and researcher
- Title: Graeme Clark Chair in Audiology and Speech Science
- Awards: Fellow of Audiology Australia

Academic background
- Education: Bachelor of Science, physics and pure mathematics Master of Science, Audiology; Doctor of Philosophy
- Alma mater: University of Melbourne
- Thesis: Speech perception in noise for multichannel cochlear implant users (1991)

Academic work
- Institutions: University of Melbourne

Richard Charles Dowell is an Australian audiologist, academic and researcher. He holds the Graeme Clark Chair in Audiology and Speech Science at University of Melbourne. He is a former director of Audiological Services at Royal Victorian Eye and Ear Hospital.

Dowell's research is centered on hearing loss; he has been involved in clinical work and research in cochlear implants, along with developing signal processing improvements for cochlear implants.

Dowell is a Fellow of Audiology Australia. He is a former Chair of the Victorian Infant Hearing Screening Program Audiological committee and a former Chair of the Taralye Early Intervention center for hearing impaired children in Melbourne.

He was appointed an Officer of the Order of Australia in the 2026 King's Birthday Honours in recognition of "distinguished service to audiology, to the development of the cochlear implant for people who are deaf or hard of hearing, and to tertiary education".

== Education ==
After completing his initial studies at Carey Baptist Grammar School, Dowell studied at the University of Melbourne where he completed his Bachelor of Science in 1977, Graduate Diploma in Audiology in 1979, Masters in Audiology in 1989 and his Doctoral studies in 1991.

== Career ==
Dowell began his career as a Research Audiologist at the University of Melbourne Department of Otolaryngology in 1980 before being promoted to Lecturer of Audiology in 1989 and to Senior Lecturer in 1991. In 1995, Dowell was promoted to Associate Professor and then Professor of Audiology from 2001 till 2013. He was appointed the Graeme Clark Chair in Audiology and Speech Science in 2013.

At the university, Dowell was appointed as Head of the Department of Otolaryngology from 2005 till 2011, and for the Department of Audiology and Speech Pathology from 2012 till 2018.

Along with his academic career at University of Melbourne, Dowell has also held clinical and hospital appointments. He devised and implemented the initial clinical trial of the multichannel cochlear implant for adults, and established and directed the Cochlear Implant Clinic at the Royal Victorian Eye and Ear Hospital with Professor Graeme Clark.

== Research ==
Dowell has conducted significant research on hearing impairment, particularly in relation to cochlear implants. He contributed to the development of many of the clinical procedures in the cochlear implant field and to signal processing improvements for these prostheses. Dowell was a key contributor to the first successful FDA approval of multi-channel cochlear implants in adults (1985) and children (1990).

=== Development of Cochlear Implants ===
Dowell studied the psychophysical properties of electrical stimuli presented to cochlear implant patients with colleagues Graeme Clark, Yit Chow Tong, and Peter Blamey. These studies resulted in publications that established some of the fundamental basic science for electrical hearing.

Dowell then devised the initial clinical trial of the first commercial multichannel cochlear implant resulting in FDA approval for adults with profound hearing loss in 1985.

With colleagues, Peter Seligman and Blamey, Dowell helped to develop the initial sound coding algorithms for the multichannel cochlear implant.

=== Clinical application of Cochlear Implants ===
Dowell, working with Blamey and others, established factors predictive of outcomes for adults who received cochlear implants. This study was followed up in 2013 by Blamey and Dowell, with other colleagues, who collected data for 2251 adults who used cochlear implants to study the factors affecting auditory performance. The study found that the history and duration of hearing loss, age and other factors were associated with cochlear implant outcomes, but that no single factor had good predictive power.

In 2006, Dowell with PhD student Mansze Mok, published a study to address the use of cochlear implants in conjunction with conventional hearing aids in the opposite ear. The study showed that acoustic hearing can provide complementary information to that provided by a cochlear implant and thus improve speech understanding.

==== Cochlear implants in Children ====
Dowell worked on identifying the factors affecting the speech perception scores among children using cochlear implants. A large sample of children using the Nucleus 22-electrode cochlear implant and having an average age of 5 years at the time of implantation were evaluated. Multivariate analysis identified six factors, including age at implantation, educational approach, progression of hearing loss and developmental delay that were predictive for speech perception scores.

In the mid-2000s, Dowell, with colleague and wife Shani Dettman amongst others, studied the risks and benefits regarding the communication development of children who received cochlear implant surgery before 12 months of age. The study showed that spoken language acquisition for deaf children depended significantly on access to auditory input in their first year.

=== Other audiology research ===
Dowell has been involved in research into auditory neuropathy with colleague Gary Rance, that established the diagnostic and management procedures for this distinct type of hearing loss identified in the late 1990s.

Dowell has also been involved in research into the evaluation and management of vestibular disorders, the use of electrophysiological techniques in diagnostic audiology, and evaluation of hearing deficits of non-peripheral origin.

== Bibliography ==
=== Books ===
- The University of Melbourne-Nucleus Multi-Electrode Cochlear Implant (Advances in Oto-Rhino-Laryngology, Vol. 38) 1987 ISBN 978-3805545754
- Cochlear Implantation for Infants and Children: Advances (1997) ISBN 9781565937277
