= Rene Le Miere =

Australian judge

Rene Lucien Le Miere (born 28 February 1952) was a judge of the Supreme Court of Western Australia. He migrated to Western Australia from Jersey in 1965, with his family. In 1978 he was admitted to practise as a barrister in Western Australia and joined the WA Bar Association in 1988, and was appointed Queen's Counsel in 1993. He was a member of the Law Society from 1983–91, and served as president from 1989–90. Le Miere was appointed to the Supreme Court of Western Australia in 2004. As mandated by the Judges’ Retirement Act, he retired from the Supreme Court when he reached the age of 70 in February 2022. Following his retirement, Le Miere continued working as a private mediator and arbitrator at Quayside Chambers.

He was educated at Aquinas College, Perth and the University of Western Australia.

Le Miere was appointed a Member of the Order of Australia in the 2026 King's Birthday Honours in recognition of his "significant service to the judiciary, to the law, and to the arts".
