= Toby Simkin =

English theatrical producer and impresario (1964–2024)

Toby Simkin AM
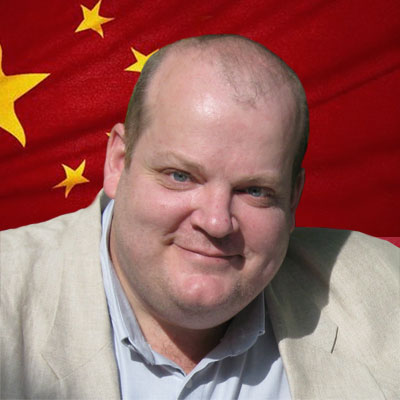
- Simkin in 2008
- Born: 21 April 1964; Chalfont St Giles, England
- Died: 7 April 2024 (aged 59); Shanghai, China
- Occupations: Impresario, businessman
- Known for: Producing Broadway, West End & web pioneering
- Website: tobysimkin.com

Toby Simkin
- Simplified Chinese: 沈途彬
Transcriptions
Standard Mandarin
- Hanyu Pinyin: Shen Tu Bin

Toby Simkin (Chinese: 沈途彬; pinyin: Shen Tu Bin, 21 April 1964 – 7 April 2024) was an English theatrical producer and impresario most notable for his work on Broadway and off-Broadway and in London's West End. From 2004, he worked throughout China, living in Shanghai developing a national theatre network and producing films and musicals for import and export.

== Early life ==
Simkin was born on 21 April 1964 in Chalfont St Giles, Buckinghamshire, England. His father was Australian Brigadier General M.B. Simkin, CBE, KStJ (died 2003) and his mother was Irene Simkin. Along with his three siblings, Simkin was raised in Australia in a military family, that later became a diplomatic family; Simkin lived in many countries experiencing different cultures, and was educated in Washington D.C. and Brisbane, Australia. In childhood, he wanted to be an archaeologist. He started in theatre in the early 1980s, winning the Elizabeth Bequest Scholarship in Australia. He produced and directed his first show at the age of 18, The Long and the Short and the Tall.

== Career ==
=== Broadway ===
On Broadway, his producing credits include the Tony Award winning Long Day's Journey into Night (starring Vanessa Redgrave, Brian Dennehy and Philip Seymour Hoffman); I Am My Own Wife (starring Jefferson Mays); Death of a Salesman (starring Brian Dennehy) plus The Crucible (starring Liam Neeson and Laura Linney); Marc Salem's Mind Games; The Price; and Victor/Victoria (starring Dame Julie Andrews).

Simkin was a member of the League of American Theatres and Producers.

=== Off Broadway ===
Off-Broadway, he was Executive Producer of Savion Glover's NYC and national tours of Improvography I & II, Classical Savion, Matt & Ben, Savion at the Rialto and for Celebrity's Constellation in Europe, Batir, A Hot Minute (both directed/choreographed by Wayne Cilento), An American Canteen in Paris, and Spotlight Broadway.

=== West End ===
On the West End/London his producing credits include, The Female of the Species (starring Eileen Atkins) I Am My Own Wife (starring Jefferson Mays);, and Death of a Salesman (starring Brian Dennehy). His other production credits include Blood Brothers (starring Stephanie Lawrence), Damn Yankees (starring Jerry Lewis), Rent, Side Man, and Václav Havel's Temptation (starring Rula Lenska and Sylvester McCoy).

=== International ===
Around the world, other production and producing credits included producing the New Year's Eve engagement of Plácido Domingo, José Carreras and Luciano Pavarotti in The Three Tenors (Vancouver); Relatively Speaking (Washington D.C.); and in Canada, Driving Miss Daisy; Something in the Air, Blood Brothers; Connie Francis; The Ecstasy of Rita Joe; Damn Yankees (starring Davis Gaines); Arsenic and Old Lace; Love Letters (starring Victor Garber and Kate Nelligan); Godspell reunion and the Tribute to Gilda Radner (with Paul Shaeffer, John Candy, Martin Short, Andrea Martin, Marvin Hamlisch and Dave Thomas for CBC TV); Forever Plaid and the Shanghai Ballet's Tour of The White Haired Girl. In China, 42nd Street and Elton John and Tim Rice's Aida; in Australia, over 40 productions, for many companies.

Simkin managed marketing and produced numerous shows for Microsoft. Other industrials include the SkyDome Opening Ceremonies; Volkswagen EuroVan Launch; Toronto Arts Awards and The Dinosaur World Tour.

=== Theatrical broadcasts ===
In March 1997, Simkin partnered with Microsoft to produce the first livestreamed Broadway show, the opening night of Annie. Subsequent broadcasts were made of Les Misérables, Jerry Lewis's Damn Yankees (from London) and others. Simkin's company, Buy Broadway, went public in 1998 and he sold it in 2000, becoming vice-president of the Broadway Television Network.

== Later life and death ==
Simkin controlled worldwide rights to various film and stage properties, including the motion picture USD $14 million budgeted film "The Sacrifice of Yang GuiFei" (based on the story of Yang GuiFei) along with "Tea 4 Two" and "The Great Big Chinese Show".

Simkin died at his home in Shanghai on 7 April 2024, at the age of 59.

He was appointed a Member of the Order of Australia posthumously in the 2026 King's Birthday Honours in recognition of his "significant service to musical theatre, and to major event production".
