= Graeme Harper (writer) =

Australian writer

Graeme Harper AM is a creative writer and academic, who writes under his own name and under the pseudonym Brooke Biaz. In 1993, Harper received the degree of Doctor of Creative Arts, specializing in creative writing, at the University of Technology, Sydney. This was the first doctorate in creative writing conferred in Australia.

Harper's fiction, which is often set in invented locations, on fictional islands, or in places resembling a combination of America, Australia and the United Kingdom, explores the evolution of characters faced with unusual situations or in historically challenging circumstances. He has won a range of literary and research awards, and his critical work is widely cited, particularly in relation to the development of the contemporary critical study of creative writing.

In 2026, he was appointed a Member of the Order of Australia for “significant service to Literature, to Education and to Creative Writing.”

== Education and academic career ==
Following his award of the DCA degree at the University of Technology, Sydney, Harper sought further experience and, attracted by the work of Sir Malcolm Bradbury, headed to the University of East Anglia in the United Kingdom, where he studied and taught in the creative and critical writing program, under the tutelage of Professor Jon Cook and connecting to Bradbury, as he had planned. He received a Ph.D. from the UEA School of English and American Studies in 1997. During this time at UEA he began work with Multilingual Matters Publishers, who later would launch the now well-known journal New Writing: the International Journal for the Practice and Theory of Creative Writing.

In 1997, he accepted a position at the University of Wales, Bangor, where he taught creative writing and developed the Centre for Creative and Performing Arts. While at the University of Wales he was a member of the European Commission's Directorate-General for Education, Youth, Sport and Culture Panel of Experts (DGX), from 1998 to 2001, assessing creative and educational projects across Europe. It was also while at the University of Wales that he began his appointment as panelist and assessor at Great Britain's Arts and Humanities Research Council (AHRC), first as a panelist and then as a senior panelist and strategic committee member on practice-led creative research from 2003 until 2015.

In 2004, he was appointed as the founding chair of the School of Creative Arts, Film and Media at the University of Portsmouth, staying at Portsmouth from 2004 to 2006, and establishing the school, which contains cinema and media studies, creative writing, theatre and music studies. During his time at Portsmouth he began publishing with the emerging Parlor Press in the United States, whose focus on both creative and critical writing was of interest to him. His first work with Parlor was the collection of short stories and a novella, Small Maps of the World (2006).

He returned to the University of Wales in 2007, having been invited to establish an initiative focusing on the development of creative and critical practices. There he created the inaugural National Institute for Excellence in the Creative Industries (NIECI), which afterwards became the School of Creative Studies and Media. Harper was later promoted to Director of Research for the College of Arts, Humanities and Education, while remaining involved as a doctoral supervisor of creative writing in the new creative studies school.

Completing his novel, Moon Dance, in 2010-2011, he was awarded fellowships to continue his writing, research and teaching, first at the University of Montevallo in Montevallo, Alabama, as a Distinguished Professor in the honors program, and later at the University of Texas Medical Branch in Galveston (2010-2011) as a visiting Research Professor, where his focus was on creativity and environmental design in medical environments. It was while at the University of Texas Medical Branch that he wrote early drafts of the novel The Invention of Dying (2015)

In 2011 he moved permanently to the United States, becoming the Dean of The Honors College at Oakland University in Michigan, USA, a founding institution in US Honors colleges and programs, which in 2025 was named as the Donna and Walt Young Honors College. He wrote the novel The Japanese Cook during his first years at Oakland. There he also directs the Midwest Center for Undergraduate Research (MCUR). He is a past chair of the At-Large Division of the Council on Undergraduate Research, the former inaugural chair of the Higher Education Committee at the National Association of Writers in Education (NAWE) in the UK, and the past chair of the Creative Writing Studies Organization in the USA. He is currently Director of the National Society for Minorities in Honors. and of the Creative Writing Studies Center. He has been an honorary researcher and creative practice professor at Edge Hill University in the UK, at Emory University in the USA (MARBL Fellow) and at Shanghai University in China.

In 2005, Harper became an elected Fellow of the Royal Society of Medicine (RSM), building on his involvement in the launch of the Medical Humanities in the United Kingdom, and later informing his exploration of medical environments during his fellowship time at the University of Texas Medical Branch. His interest in empathy in medicine and in medical science has seen him involved in the work of Leader Dogs for the Blind, an international guide dog organization. In 2018 he initiated (and currently advises) a university-wide student program to raise future leader dogs for the blind and sight-impaired. His novel, Releasing the Animals, while not about Leader Dogs, is an exploration of freedom and empowerment, set in the vicinity of a fictional zoo. He is also an elected Fellow of the Royal Society for the Encouragement of Arts, Manufactures and Commerce (RSA), having been one of the founding members of RSA Cymru/Wales, of the Royal Anthropological Institute, and of the Royal Geographical Society (RGS).

In addition to his work as Editor-in-Chief of the journal New Writing: the International Journal for the Practice and Theory of Creative Writing, he is also the Editor of the Creative Industries Journal. He is Co-Editor (with O. Evans) of Studies in European Cinema and (with O. Evans and C. Johnston) of the Journal of European Popular Culture.

== Publications ==
=== Fiction ===
- 1988: Black Cat, Green Field ISBN 9780947189143
- 2000: Swallowing Film ISBN 0953534413
- 2006: Small Maps of the World ISBN 9781932559569
- 2008: Moon Dance ISBN 9781602350434
- 2009: Camera Phone ISBN 9781602351622
- 2011: Visit the Communion Islands ISBN 9780956700308
- 2013: Making Up ISBN 9781443844628
- 2015: The Invention of Dying ISBN 9781602355392
- 2018: The Japanese Cook ISBN 9781602355828
- 2023: Releasing the Animals ISBN 9781643173092
- 2026: Robots and Other People ISBN 978-1-64317-581-2

=== Non-Fiction ===
- 2001: Colonial and Postcolonial Incarceration ISBN 9780826449184
- 2002: Comedy, Fantasy and Colonialism ISBN 9780826448668
- 2005: Signs of Life: Medicine and Cinema (With Andrew Moor) ISBN 9781904764168
- 2006: Teaching Creative Writing ISBN 9780826477279
- 2006: The Unsilvered Screen: Surrealism on Film (With Rob Stone) ISBN 9781904764878
- 2008: Creative Writing Guidebook ISBN 9780826494283
- 2009: Authors at Work: the Creative Environment (Essays and Studies) (With Ceri Sullivan) ISBN 9781843841951
- 2009: Sound and Music in Film and Visual Media: A Critical Overview (With Section Editors, Ruth Doughty and Jochen Eisentraut) ISBN 9780826458247
- 2010: On Creative Writing ISBN 9781847692573
- 2011: Cinema and Landscape: Film, Nation and Cultural Geography (With J. Rayner) ISBN 9781841503097
- 2011: Creative Writing Studies: Practice, Research and Pedagogy (With Jeri Kroll) ISBN 9781847690203
- 2012: Key Issues in Creative Writing (With Dianne Donnelly) ISBN 9781847698469
- 2012: Research Methods in Creative Writing (With Jeri Kroll) ISBN 9780230242661
- 2013: Film Landscapes: Design, Discovery and Communication (With J. Rayner) ISBN 9781443843720
- 2013: New Ideas on the Writing Arts: Practice, Culture, Literature ISBN 9781443849074
- 2013: The Blackwell Companion to Creative Writing ISBN 9780470656938
- 2014: The Future for Creative Writing ISBN 9780470654927
- 2015: Creative Writing and Education ISBN 9781783093526
- 2016: Exploring Creative Writing ISBN 9781443889834
- 2017: Changing Creative Writing in America ISBN 9781783098811
- 2017: Filmurbia: Cinema and the Suburbs (With D. Forrest and J. Rayner) ISBN 9781349708956
- 2018: Critical Approaches to Creative Writing ISBN 9781138931558
- 2018: Diversity, Equity and Inclusion in Honors Education ISBN 9781527506367
- 2019: Honors Education: Excellence, Innovation, Ingenuity ISBN 9781527528031
- 2019: The Desire to Write ISBN 9781137519900
- 2019: Thinking Creative Writing ISBN 9780367730543
- 2020: Creative Writing: Drafting, Revising, Editing (With Jeri Kroll) ISBN 9781352007671
- 2020: Discovering Creative Writing ISBN 9781788928458
- 2020: Responding to Creative Writing ISBN 9781527557598
- 2021: Honors Education and the Foundation of Fairness: A Question of Equity ISBN 9781527566637
- 2022: Honors Education Around the World ISBN 9781527576339
- 2022: Creative Writing Analysis ISBN 9780367902186
- 2022: Innovative Practices in Creative Writing Teaching ISBN 9781527591141
- 2023 Stimulus, Intention and Process in Creative Writing: A Reader ISBN 9781032637181
- 2024: Advancing Honors Education for Today and Tomorrow ISBN 9781036407742
- 2024: The Creative Writing Compass ISBN 9781032004907
- 2025: New Writing Scholarship: Studying Creative Writing ISBN 9781032854465
- 2025: New Writing Explorations: Researching Creative Writing ISBN 9781032854625
- 2025: AI and Creative Writing ISBN 9783031991004
- 2026: Empathy in Creative Writing: Ethics, Diversity and Communication ISBN 9783032028594
- 2026: Creative Writing Curiosity: Ten Essays on the Curious and the Writerly ISBN 9781680034684

== Selected awards and honors ==
- 2026. Member of the Order of Australia
- 2021. Shanghai He Jianning Literary Prize
- 2017. Elected Honorary Member, Phi Theta Kappa Honor Society
- 2014. Elected Honorary Member, Golden Key International Honor Society
- 2011-2015. Visiting Research Professor, Edge Hill University
- 2012. The Mütter Museum and Historical Medical Library Fellowship (Creative Writing)
- 2011. The UTMB Visiting Research Professor, University of Texas Medical Branch, Galveston, Texas.
- 2010. MARBL Fellow, Emory University, Atlanta, USA
- 2010. Pascal Vacca Distinguished Professor, Eminent Scholars Chair, University of Montevallo
- 2009. Sainsbury Centre Visiting Scholar - Summer Resident
- 2008. Elected Member, Literature Wales
- 2006-2008. Appointed Creative Writing Member, Arts and Humanities Research Council Committee on Practice-Led Research
- 2005. British Academy Travelling Grant
- 2004. British Academy Grant for Creative Writing Research
- 2002. BBC World Service Short Story Award
- 2001. National Endowment for Science, Technology and the Arts (NESTA) Awardee
- 2001. Arts and Humanities Research Council Creative Writing Grant
- 2001. Norton Island Creative Writing Residency
- 1993-1997. Overseas Student Award and University of East Anglia Creative Writing Scholarship
- 1991-1994. Vogel Literary Award for New Writers, Shortlisted for Jacob's Shroud (1991), Moon Rising (1992) and The Valley (1994)
- 1990-1994. Inaugural Scholars Award in Creative and Critical Writing, Commonwealth Vice-Chancellors and Principals
- 1990. Australia Council Literary Fellowship
- 1989. NSW Premier's Award in New Fiction
- 1988. Inaugural Australian National Book Council Award for New Writers - the Banjo Paterson Award
