= Jonathon Howard =

Australian biophysicist and cell biologist

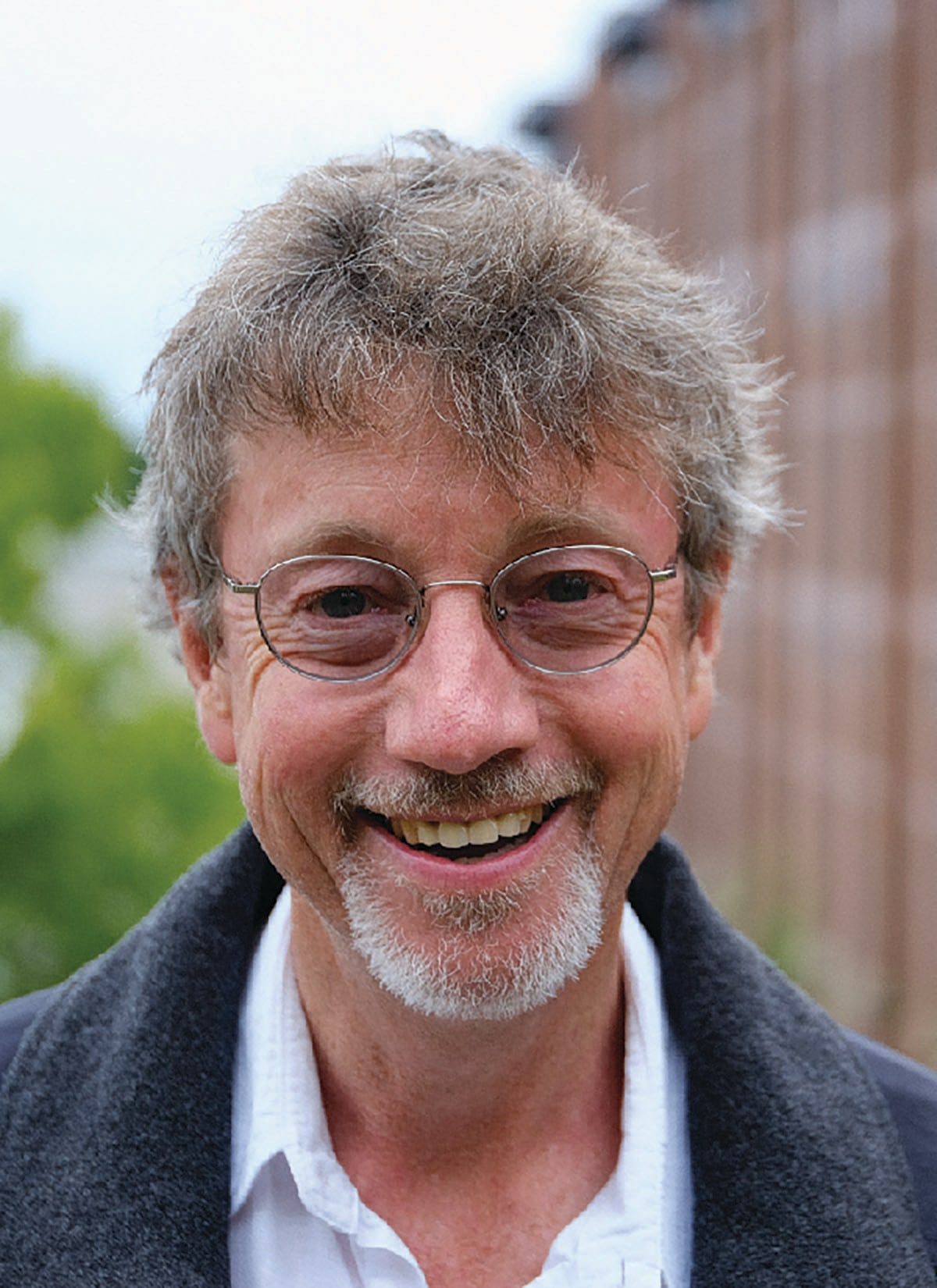
- Education: Australian National University
- Known for: Research in single-molecule biophysics of motor proteins, cytoskeleton, cell shape and motion
- Spouse: Karla Neugebauer
- Children: Olivia Howard and Peter Neugebauer
- Scientific career
- Thesis: Kinetics and noise of transduction in insect photoreceptors (1982)
- Doctoral advisor: Allan Snyder, Simon Laughlin
- Website: https://howardlab.yale.edu

Jonathon (Joe) Howard (born 1957 in Sydney) is a biophysicist and cell biologist. He is the Eugene Higgins Professor of Molecular Biophysics & Biochemistry and a professor of physics at Yale University. His research is focused on microtubules, motor proteins and cell shape and motion.

== Education ==
Howard was educated at Australian National University, where he received a B.Sc. degree (with honors) in Pure Mathematics in 1979 and a Ph.D. in Neurobiology in 1983. His Ph.D. thesis is titled Kinetics and noise of transduction in insect photoreceptors, and his supervisors were Allan Snyder and Simon Laughlin.

== Career and research ==
During his PhD, he worked with Simon Laughlin, who is an experimentalist, and Allan Snyder, who is a theoretician, on the optics and electrophysiological properties of the fly compound eye.

During his postdoc with A. James Hudspeth at University of California, San Francisco, he made several major contributions to the understanding of hair cells and motor proteins. He developed very precise mechanical techniques to study how hair cells of the vertebrate inner ear detect sound and acceleration. and confirmed the "gating spring" model, proposed by Corey and Hudspeth. He also discovered that hair cells adapt to sustained stimuli via a mechanical mechanism in which an active process, which he hypothesized to be driven by the motor protein myosin-1, regulates the tension in the gating spring. During this period, he also collaborated with Ronald Vale, and developed the first single-molecule assay for studying motor proteins. His work showed that kinesin moves processively, taking several hundred steps along a microtubule before dissociating. This finding explained how kinesin could carry cargos long distances in the axons of nerve cells. This work also helped to establish the field of single-molecule biophysics.

In 1989, Howard set up his own lab at the University of Washington, where his research focused on how motor proteins convert chemical energy derived from the hydrolysis of ATP into mechanical work used to drive cell motility. His research contributes to our understanding of motor protein and microtubule in the following ways: his group

- measured the force generated by a single kinesin molecule, ~5 pN.
- showed that kinesin moves on a path parallel to the protofilaments and measured the dependence of the speed of movement of kinesin on the load force
- determined that each kinesin hydrolyzing exactly one molecule of ATP for each 8-nm step that it takes along the surface of the microtubule

In 2000, Howard moved to Germany, where he played a key role, as Director, in establishing the Max Planck Institute of Molecular Cell Biology and Genetics (MPI-CBG) in Dresden, one of the foremost biological research institutes in Europe. At the MPI-CBG, research in the Howard lab focused on:

- the regulation of microtubule dynamics by microtubule-associated proteins
- mechanics of flagella
- invertebrate mechanoreceptors
- collective cell dynamics in active matter

In 2013, Howard became the Eugene Higgins Professor of Molecular Biophysics and Biochemistry at Yale University.

At Yale, he has continued his interest in the biophysics of the microtubule skeleton, including studies of the microtubule-severing proteins Spastin, spindle localization in the C. elegans embryo, ciliary beating in Chlamydomonas, physical bioenergetics during Zebrafish embryogenesis and branching morphogenesis of neuronal dendrites.

Howard summarized many results and ideas on molecular motors in a monograph Mechanics of Motor Proteins and the Cytoskeleton, which has sold over 5,000 copies and been cited more than 3,000 times.

== Awards and honors ==
- Appointed a Member of the Order of Australia (2026)
- Elected member of Connecticut Academy of Science and Engineering (2017)
- Fellow of the Biophysical Society (2017)
- External Member of the Max Planck Institute for the Physics of Complex Systems (2016)"
- Pioneer Award, National Institutes of Health (2015)
- Member, European Molecular Biology Organization (2004)
- John Simon Guggenheim Fellow (1996)
- Sloan Research Fellowship (1990)
- Pew Scholar, Program in the Biomedical Sciences (1990)
