= Biology of Reproduction =

- Discipline: Reproductive biology
- Language: English
- Edited by: Wei Yan, MD, PhD; Hugh Clarke, PhD

Publication details
- History: 1969–present
- Frequency: Monthly
- Impact factor: 4.285 (2020)

Standard abbreviations
- ISO 4: Biol. Reprod.

Indexing
- CODEN: BIREBV
- ISSN: 0006-3363 (print); 1529-7268 (web)

Links
- Journal homepage

Biology of Reproduction is a peer-reviewed scientific journal and the official journal of the Society for the Study of Reproduction. It is published with the assistance of Oxford University Press. According to the Journal Citation Reports, the journal has a 2020 impact factor of 4.285, ranking it 5th out of 29 journals in the category "Reproductive Biology".
