= Florence Knight =

British chef and newspaper columnist

- Born: Surrey, England
- Education: Leith's School of Food and Wine
- Spouse: Richard Beatty
- Culinary career
- Previous restaurant: Polpo
- Website: www.florenceknight.co.uk

Florence Knight is a British chef and newspaper columnist, best known for her work at the restaurant Polpetto in London. She has also written for both The Times and the Sunday Times.

== Career ==
Florence Knight grew up near Godalming, Surrey. She was the second youngest of five siblings. Knight initially studied at the London College of Fashion, but she changed career paths following the death of her father and trained at Leith's School of Food and Wine. She began working in professional kitchens at the age of 19.

She began working for Raymond Blanc, first at Le Manoir aux Quat' Saisons and then as a pastry chef at his Diamond Club within the Emirates Stadium. She was then hired as head chef for Polpetto, located in The French House, Soho. The restaurant was intended to be the smaller, more casual version of the restaurant Polpo with the same menu. However, over time, Knight convinced owners Russell Norman and Richard Beatty to let her modify the menu, which was Venetian. The restaurant closed on 26 May 2012, aiming to reopen in newer, larger premises by the end of the year.

During the hiatus, she worked on her first cookbook One: A Cook and Her Cupboard. Knight returned to Polpo when it reopened in the new location, and continued to work there until 2015 late into her first pregnancy. During her maternity leave, she worked as a columnist for The Times. Knight was later named as the official Sunday Times chef in May 2015, replacing the departing Gizzi Erskine. After the birth of Knight's second child, she began to look for a location for her own restaurant.

== Personal life ==
Knight owns two dogs, a cockapoo and a dachshund/poodle cross. She married Beatty, and together they have two children. Knight was diagnosed with dyslexia as a child.
