= Holgate School =

Holgate School could refer to a number of schools:

== United Kingdom ==
- Annie Holgate Infant and Nursery School, a primary school in Hucknall, near Nottingham
- Annie Holgate Junior School, a primary school in Hucknall, near Nottingham
- Archbishop Holgate's School, a CofE voluntary aided comprehensive school in York
- Holgate Pre-school, a daycare centre in York
- Holgate School, a defunct comprehensive school in Barnsley
- Holgate School, now known as The Holgate Academy, in Hucknall near Nottingham

== United States ==
- Holgate High School, a public High School in Ohio
