= Results of the 2005 Western Australian state election (Legislative Council) =

2005 Western Australian state election (Legislative Council)
- 26 February 2005

All 34 seats in the Legislative Council 17 seats needed for a majority

	First party	Second party	Third party
Leader	Kim Chance	Norman Moore	None
Party	Labor	Liberal	Greens
Leader's seat	Agricultural	Mining and Pastoral	—
Seats before	13	12	5
Seats won	16	15	3
Seat change	▲3	▲3	▼2
Popular vote	475,717	407,306	82,507
Percentage	43.35%	37.12%	7.52%
Swing	▲5.41pp	▲3.16pp	▼0.48pp
	Fourth party	Fifth party
		PHON
Leader	None	John Fischer
Party	National	One Nation
Leader's seat	N/A	Mining and Pastoral (lost seat)
Seats before	1	3
Seats won	1	0
Seat change	Steady	▼3
Popular vote	23,985	17,435
Percentage	2.19%	1.59%
Swing	▼0.21pp	▼8.29pp

This is a list of electoral region results for the Western Australian Legislative Council in the 2005 Western Australian state election.

== Results by electoral region ==
=== Agricultural ===
2005 Western Australian state election: Agricultural
Party	Candidate	Votes	%	±%
Quota		14,056		
Liberal	1. Bruce Donaldson (elected 1); 2. Anthony Fels (elected 4); 3. Margaret Rowe (elected 5); 4. Brian Ellis	33,198	39.4	+9.4
Labor	1. Kim Chance (elected 2); 2. Tim Daly; 3. Darren West	22,504	26.7	+6.5
National	1. Murray Criddle (elected 3); 2. Wendy Duncan; 3. Chris Nelson; 4. Denise Clydesdale-Gebert	16,251	19.3	+0.4
Greens	1. Dee Margetts; 2. Basil Schur	3,708	4.4	−0.1
One Nation	1. Ron McLean; 2. Barry Strahan; 3. Michael Fallis	2,528	3.0	−19.0
New Country	1. Frank Hough; 2. Colin Nicholl; 3. Frank Marley	1,946	2.3	+2.3
Christian Democrats	1. Lachlan Dunjey; 2. Alistair McNabb	1,590	1.9	+1.9
Family First	1. Nigel Irvine; 2. Heidi Farhi	1,271	1.5	+1.5
Independent	Roy Duncanson	477	0.6	+0.6
Democrats	1. Anthony Bennell; 2. David Thackrah	309	0.4	−1.5
Liberals for Forests	1. Peter Theobald; 2. Joy Richardson	278	0.3	+0.3
Citizens Electoral Council	1. Jean Robinson; 2. Stuart Smith	244	0.3	+0.3
Public Hospital Support Group	1. John Darby; 2. Paul Shann	27	0.03	+0.03
Total formal votes		84,331	97.1	−0.4
Informal votes		2,488	2.9	+0.4
Turnout		86,819	91.4	−0.6

=== East Metropolitan ===
2005 Western Australian state election: East Metropolitan
Party	Candidate	Votes	%	±%
Quota		40,150		
Labor	1. Ljiljanna Ravlich (elected 1); 2. Nick Griffiths (elected 3); 3. Louise Pratt (elected 4); 4. Batong Pham; 5. Todd Gogol; 6. Rita Saffioti	121,910	50.6	+6.4
Liberal	1. Helen Morton (elected 2); 2. Donna Taylor (elected 5); 3. Bill Munro	77,304	32.1	+1.8
Greens	1. Lee Bell; 2. Alison Xamon	15,593	6.5	+0.1
Christian Democrats	1. Vivian Hill; 2. Gerard Goiran	7,107	3.0	+0.2
Family First	1. Jim McCourt; 2. David Bolt	5,724	2.4	+2.4
One Nation	1. James Hopkinson; 2. Maureen Gordon	4,861	2.0	−8.0
Democrats	1. Robyn Danski; 2. Paul McCutcheon	1,968	0.8	−3.3
Liberals for Forests	1. Sarah Berry; 2. Claire Hart	1,863	0.8	+0.8
Independent	John Tucak	1,688	0.7	+0.5
Public Hospital Support Group	1. Colin Ross; 2. Avril Ross	1,305	0.5	+0.5
Group B	1. Annolies Truman; 2. Emma Clancy	695	0.3	+0.3
New Country	1. Laurissa Lockett; 2. John Mania	469	0.2	+0.2
Citizens Electoral Council	Daniel Stevens	317	0.1	+0.1
Independent	John Button	134	0.1	+0.1
Independent	Sylvia Yarnda Mnyirrinna	59	0.02	+0.02
Total formal votes		240,897	96.5	−0.6
Informal votes		8,626	3.5	+0.6
Turnout		249,523	91.3	−0.7

=== Mining and Pastoral ===
2005 Western Australian state election: Mining and Pastoral
Party	Candidate	Votes	%	±%
Quota		8,351		
Labor	1. Shelley Archer (elected 1); 2. Jon Ford (elected 3); 3. Vince Catania (elected 5); 4. Shelley Eaton; 5. Michael Anderton; 6. Stephen Dawson	22,060	44.0	+4.5
Liberal	1. Norman Moore (elected 2); 2. Ken Baston (elected 4); 3. Brett Nazzari; 4. John Fawcett; 5. Greg Smith	17,908	35.7	+9.0
Greens	1. Robin Chapple; 2. Kado Muir	3,798	7.6	+3.2
Group I	1. John Fischer; 2. Graeme Campbell; 3. Valerie McCooke	2,955	5.9	+5.9
One Nation	1. Irene Wyborn; 2. Neville Smith	1,022	2.0	−11.9
Public Hospital Support Group	1. Henry Beal; 2. Jim Jennings	924	1.8	+1.8
Christian Democrats	1. Chris Lakay; 2. Derk Gans	815	1.6	+1.6
Democrats	1. Don Hoddy; 2. Peter Crawford	317	0.6	−1.0
Liberals for Forests	1. Karen Jones; 2. Alexandra O'Shaughnessy	227	0.5	+0.5
Citizens Electoral Council	Brian Lewis	78	0.2	+0.2
Total formal votes		50,104	97.1	−0.5
Informal votes		1,506	2.9	+0.5
Turnout		51,610	75.6	−4.3

=== North Metropolitan ===
2005 Western Australian state election: North Metropolitan
Party	Candidate	Votes	%	±%
Quota		42,732		
Labor	1. Ed Dermer (elected 1); 2. Ken Travers (elected 3); 3. Graham Giffard (elected 5); 4. Daniel Smith; 5. Carolyn Burton; 6. Daniel Mycyk	144,921	42.4	+5.4
Liberal	1. George Cash (elected 2); 2. Peter Collier (elected 4); 3. Ray Halligan (elected 6); 4. David Clyne; 5. Rod Webb	137,888	40.3	+1.9
Greens	1. Giz Watson (elected 7); 2. Cameron Poustie; 3. Brenda Roy	30,065	8.8	−0.9
Christian Democrats	1. Dwight Randall; 2. Raymond Moran	8,130	2.4	0.0
Family First	1. Michelle Bolt; 2. Symia Hopkinson	6,370	1.9	+1.9
Democrats	1. Pat Olver; 2. Giuseppe Coletti	3,726	1.1	−3.2
Independent	Kevin Cloghan	3,611	1.1	+1.1
One Nation	1. George Gault; 2. Alex Patrick	3,123	0.9	−5.2
Public Hospital Support Group	1. Kareen Squires; 2. Patricia Edmonds	2,067	0.6	+0.6
Liberals for Forests	1. Renae Dunkley; 2. Bill Wormald	1,617	0.5	+0.5
Group D	1. Nikki Ulasowski; 2. Don Cowan	239	0.1	+0.1
Independent	Malcolm Mummery	93	0.03	+0.03
Total formal votes		341,850	97.1	−0.3
Informal votes		10,295	2.9	+0.3
Turnout		352,145	90.5	−0.2

=== South Metropolitan ===
2005 Western Australian state election: South Metropolitan
Party	Candidate	Votes	%	±%
Quota		39,484		
Labor	1. Kate Doust (elected 1); 2. Sue Ellery (elected 3); 3. Sheila Mills (elected 5); 4. David Vallelonga; 5. David Klemm; 6. Daniel Guise	110,286	46.6	+3.6
Liberal	1. Simon O'Brien (elected 2); 2. Barbara Scott (elected 4); 3. Roger Nicholls; 4. Alison Gibson; 5. Jane Blake	85,114	35.9	+2.0
Greens	1. Lynn MacLaren; 2. Nicola Paris	18,501	7.8	−1.2
Christian Democrats	1. Peter Watt; 2. Venetia Turkington	4,994	2.1	+2.1
Family First	1. Beverley Custers; 2. Paul Dean-Smith	4,342	1.8	+1.8
Fremantle Hospital Support Group	1. Murray McKay; 2. Giovanni Rotondella	3,103	1.3	+1.3
Democrats	1. Jason Meotti; 2. Andrew Ingram	3,090	1.3	−3.6
One Nation	1. Teresa van Lieshout; 2. Neil Gilmour	2,810	1.2	−5.9
Independent	Jakica Zaknic	1,206	0.5	+0.5
Public Hospital Support Group	1. Neil Marrett; 2. Vicki Doutch	1,169	0.5	+0.5
Liberals for Forests	1. Vicky Taylor; 2. Louise Wormald	1,030	0.4	+0.4
Independent	Won Choi	644	0.3	+0.3
Independent	Doug Thorp	451	0.2	+0.2
Group K	1. Ian Jamieson; 2. Sam Wainwright	149	0.1	+0.1
Independent	Steven Milianku	13	0.01	+0.01
Total formal votes		236,902	96.6	−0.8
Informal votes		8,292	3.4	+0.8
Turnout		245,194	90.5	−0.4

=== South West ===
2005 Western Australian state election: South West
Party	Candidate	Votes	%	±%
Quota		17,908		
Liberal	1. Barry House (elected 1); 2. Robyn McSweeney (elected 3); 3. Nigel Hallett (elected 5); 4. Ken Robinson; 5. Kerrol Gildersleeve; 6. Philippa Reid; 7. Narelle King	55,894	39.0	+3.6
Labor	1. Adele Farina (elected 2); 2. Sally Talbot (elected 4); 3. Matt Benson-Lidholm (elected 6); 4. Liam Costello; 5. Jullianne Slater; 6. Jasper Trendall	54,036	37.7	+7.0
Greens	1. Paul Llewellyn (elected 7); 2. Kingsley Gibson	10,842	7.6	−0.9
National	1. Steve Dilley; 2. Colin Holt	7,734	5.4	−0.8
Family First	1. Linda Rose; 2. Coleen Heine	4,330	3.0	+3.0
One Nation	1. Alan Giorgi; 2. Kenneth Waters	3,091	2.2	−12.0
Christian Democrats	1. Justin Moseley; 2. Kerry Watterson	2,375	1.7	+0.4
Independent	Ken Gunson	1,538	1.1	−0.1
Public Hospital Support Group	1. Ray Goodwin; 2. Val Goodwin	1,165	0.8	+0.8
New Country	1. Paddy Embry; 2. Frances Chester	936	0.7	+0.7
Democrats	1. Adam Welch; 2. John Partridge	770	0.5	−1.3
Liberals for Forests	1. June Bennett; 2. Judy Pryer	549	0.4	+0.4
Total formal votes		143,260	96.7	−0.7
Informal votes		4,849	3.3	+0.7
Turnout		148,109	91.1	−1.0

== See also ==
- Results of the Western Australian state election, 2005 (Legislative Assembly A-L)
- Results of the Western Australian state election, 2005 (Legislative Assembly M-Z)
- 2005 Western Australian state election
- Candidates of the Western Australian state election, 2005
- Members of the Western Australian Legislative Council, 2005–2009
