= Candidates of the 2005 Western Australian state election =

The 2005 Western Australian state election was held on 26 February 2005.

== Retiring Members ==
=== Labor ===
- Clive Brown MLA (Bassendean)
- John Cowdell MLC (South West)
- Kevin Leahy MLC (Mining and Pastoral)

=== Liberal ===
- Mike Board MLA (Murdoch)
- John Bradshaw MLA (Murray)
- Cheryl Edwardes MLA (Kingsley)
- Arthur Marshall MLA (Dawesville)
- Bill McNee MLA (Moore)
- Rod Sweetman MLA (Ningaloo)
- Peter Foss MLC (East Metropolitan)
- Bill Stretch MLC (South West)
- Derrick Tomlinson MLC (East Metropolitan)

=== National ===
- Ross Ainsworth MLA (Roe)
- Monty House MLA (Stirling)

=== Greens ===
- Chrissy Sharp MLC (South West)

=== Independent ===
- Larry Graham MLA (Pilbara)
- Phillip Pendal MLA (South Perth)
- Alan Cadby MLC (North Metropolitan) – elected as Liberal

== Legislative Assembly ==
Sitting members are shown in bold text. Successful candidates are highlighted in the relevant colour. Where there is possible confusion, an asterisk (*) is also used.

Electorate	Held by	Labor candidate	Liberal candidate	National candidate	Greens candidate	CDP candidate	Other candidates
Albany	Labor	**Peter Watson**	Andrew Partington	Beverley Ford	Tony Evers	Greg Basden	Brian Burns (ON); Colin Pyle (FFP)
Alfred Cove	Independent	Michael Kane	Graham Kierath		Scott Ryan	William Suseno	Katherine Jackson (Ind); **Janet Woollard*** (Ind)
Armadale	Labor	**Alannah MacTiernan**	Diane Johnson		Jason Brennan	Madeleine Goiran	Bret Busby (Ind); Colin Butler (ON); John Coules (FFP); Joyce Richards (CEC)
Avon	National	Gerry Sturman		**Max Trenorden**	Adrian Price	Bob Adair	Boyd Martin (ON); Ron McLean (CEC)
Balcatta	Labor	**John Kobelke**	Melinda Poor		Kayt Davies	Michael Ewers	
Ballajura	Labor	**John D'Orazio**	David Maxwell		Michael Boswell	Allan Ribbons	John Clifford (FFP); Gary Evans (ON)
Bassendean	Labor	**Martin Whitely**	Michelle Stubbs		Gemma Carter	Paul Mewhor	Peter Clifford (FFP); Graeme Harris (ON)
Belmont	Labor	**Eric Ripper**	Glenys Godfrey		Steve Wolff	Gwen Hamence	Bill Gaugg (ON)
Bunbury	Labor	**Tony Dean**	John Castrilli		Joshua Ledger	Shane Flanegan	Chris Cox (Ind); Brian McRae (ON); Jodie Murray (Ind); Mandy Robertson (FFP)
Capel	Liberal	John Mondy	Steve Thomas	Murray Scott	Richard Chapman	Trista Palmer	Carol Johnson (ON); Marilyn Shraga (FFP)
Carine	Liberal	Damien Parry	**Katie Hodson-Thomas**		Ross Copeland	Bruce Richards	
Central Kimberley-Pilbara	Independent	Tom Stephens	Trona Young		Kelly Howlett	Jason Matthews	Paul Asplin (Ind); Gavin Ness (ON); Barry Taylor (Ind)
Churchlands	Independent	Tony Walker	Greg Preston		Sonja Lundie-Jenkins	Jennifer Whately	**Liz Constable** (Ind)
Cockburn	Labor	**Fran Logan**	John Jamieson		Anne Otness	Bill Heggers	Damon Fowler (FFP); Robyn Scherr (Ind); Carol Teather (ON)
Collie-Wellington	Labor	**Mick Murray**	Craig Carbone	Neale Armstrong	David Paris	Tanya Dunjey	Edward Dabrowski (FFP); Kevin Gordon (ON); Gary Munnihy (Ind); Martha Window (NCP)
Cottesloe	Liberal	Owen Whittle	**Colin Barnett**		Steve Walker	Stuart Chapman	
Darling Range	Liberal	Geoff Stallard	**John Day**		Margo Beilby	Rob Merrells	Sam Dacheff (ON); Matthew Lague (FFP)
Dawesville	Liberal	Lynn Rodgers	**Kim Hames**	Vern Goff	Clare Nunan	Keith Blok	Julie Westbrook (FFP); Derek Withers (ON)
Fremantle	Labor	**Jim McGinty**	Rita Scolaro		Jim Scott	Michelle Shave	Adele Carles (Ind); Ian Muir (Ind); Lionel Richards (Ind); Paul Thurbon (FFP); Kerry-Ann Winmar (ON)
Geraldton	Labor	**Shane Hill**	Kevin Giudice	Sally Bennison	Paul Connolly	Mac Forsyth	Basil Atkins (CEC); Ross Paravicini (ON)
Girrawheen	Labor	**Margaret Quirk**	John Halligan		Tamara Desiatov	Richard Leeder	George Georgis (FFP); Jon Kelly (Ind); Leon McKenzie (ON); Keith Mynard (Ind)
Greenough	Liberal	John Hart	**Jamie Edwards**	Grant Woodhams	Tonya Jensen	Steve Fletcher	Pauline Anderson (ON)
Hillarys	Liberal	Anna Spadaccini	**Rob Johnson**		Chris Twomey	Perry McKerlie	John Bombak (Ind); Ken Loughton (FFP)
Joondalup	Labor	**Tony O'Gorman**	Dean Solly		Leon van der Linde	Helen Sawyer	Michael Clancy (Ind); Fred Hay (FFP)
Kalgoorlie	Liberal	James Donnelly	**Matt Birney**		Peter Burger	Gregory Smart	Robin Scott (ON); Leigh Varis Beswick (Ind)
Kenwick	Labor	**Sheila McHale**	John Kennebury		Camille Inifer	Lukas Butler	Lloyd Boon (ON); Moyna Rapp (FFP)
Kimberley	Labor	**Carol Martin**	Ron Johnston		Pat Lowe	Victoria Rafferty	Maz Fiannaca (ON); Peter Matsumoto (Ind)
Kingsley	Liberal	Judy Hughes	Colin Edwardes		Katrina Bercov	Marcus Ward	Marie Evans (Ind); Trevor Gersch (Ind); Mark Patterson (FFP)
Leschenault	Liberal	Anthony Marinovich	**Dan Sullivan**		Dee Wickham	Ross Lecras	Caroline Whitworth (ON)
Mandurah	Labor	**David Templeman**	Ashley King		Rebecca Brown	Fiona McKenzie-Brown	Sonja Davalos (ON); Trent Peterson (FFP); Ian Tuffnell (CEC)
Maylands	Labor	**Judy Edwards**	Roslyn Webb		James Rayner	Dunstan Hartley	Judy Joyce (FFP)
Merredin	National	Stephen Fewster	Jamie Falls	**Brendon Grylls**	Robert Mann	Noel Beckingham	Peter Arnold (ON); Julie Townrow (NCP)
Midland	Labor	**Michelle Roberts**	Charlie Zannino		Tim Hall	Karen Chew	Albert Caine (ON)
Mindarie	Labor	**John Quigley**	Mike Lowry		Miguel Castillo	Pat Shea	Doug Croker (FFP)
Moore	Liberal	Larraine Craven	Gary Snook	Peter Stubbs	Sally Craddock	David Hood	Kevan Brown (ON); Judy Roberts (NCP); Bob Rogers (Ind); Judy Sudholz (CEC)
Murchison-Eyre	Labor	**John Bowler**	Colin Brand		Scott Ludlam	Don Byrne	Derek Major (ON)
Murdoch	Liberal	Jackie Ormsby	Trevor Sprigg		Jan Currie	Michael Dunjey	Damian Bramanis (Ind); Ursula Stone (ON); Shayne Weller (FFP)
Murray	Labor	Nuala Keating	Murray Cowper	Julie Giumelli	Rochelle Brady	Saskia Matthews	Ron Armstrong (FFP); Morris Bessant (Ind); Angelo Dacheff (ON); Wayne Donnelly (Ind); Brian McCarthy (CEC)
Nedlands	Liberal	Chris Hondros	**Sue Walker**		Tom Wilson	Gail Forder	Brian Langenberg (FFP)
North West Coastal	Labor	**Fred Riebeling**	David Hay		Peter Shaw	Paul Pleysier	Lex Fullarton (Ind); Bob Hodgkinson (ON)
Peel	Labor	**Norm Marlborough**	Rob Brown		Julie Baker	Brent Tremain	Mick Le-Cocq (CEC); William Ritchie (ON); Graham Winterbottom (FFP)
Perth	Labor	**John Hyde**	David Lagan		Damian Douglas-Meyer	Gus Loh	Marie Edmonds (ON); Don Hyland (Ind)
Riverton	Labor	**Tony McRae**	Margaret Thomas		Brad Pettitt	Rajesh Vettoor	Trish Fowler (Ind); Deborah Hudson (FFP); Aida Konstek (ON); Choy Chan Ma (Ind)
Rockingham	Labor	**Mark McGowan**	Paul Ellis		Daniel Boulton	June Lewis	Carena Harvey (FFP); Garth Stockden (ON); Rob Totten (CEC)
Roe	National	Ron Sao	Graham Jacobs	Jane McMeikan	Louise Lodge	Steve Leeder	Bill Crabtree (Ind); Charles Johnston (ON)
Serpentine-Jarrahdale	Liberal	Daron Smith	Tony Simpson		Win Dockter	Michelle Verkerk	Fiona Cropper (Ind); Paul Nield (ON); Robert Pipes (FFP)
South Perth	Independent	Dale Kelliher	John McGrath		Alan Hopkins	Michael Davis	Jim Grayden (Ind)
Southern River	Labor	**Paul Andrews**	Monica Holmes		Mike Beilby	Terry Ryan	Brian Deane (ON); Tim Dowsett (Ind); Lisa Saladine (FFP)
Stirling	National	Jan Benson-Lidholm	Ron Scott	Terry Redman	Diane Evers	Norm Baker	Vicki Brown (Ind); Darius Crowe (ON); Terry Dixon (FFP)
Swan Hills	Labor	**Jaye Radisich**	Steve Blizard		Sharon Davies	Eric Miller	Ross Gundry (Ind); David Gunnyon (ON); Alison Hornsey (Ind); Ian Saladine (FFP); Mike Stoddart (Ind)
Vasse	Liberal	Ross Bromell	Troy Buswell	Beryle Morgan	Jim Matan	Tracey Brough	Ron Asher (NCP); Paul Clayson (FFP); Charles Doyle (ON); **Bernie Masters** (Ind)
Victoria Park	Labor	**Geoff Gallop**	Neil Fearis		Dave Fort	Brett Crook	Sue Bateman (ON)
Wagin	National	David Michael		**Terry Waldron**	Paul Davis	Peter Faulkner	Agnes Goedhart (ON); Arthur Harvey (CEC)
Wanneroo	Labor	**Dianne Guise**	Paul Miles		Marija Pericic	Seb Gerbaz	Anne Cowley (Ind); Marye Daniels (ON); Robert Green (FFP)
Warren-Blackwood	Liberal	Peter McKenzie	**Paul Omodei**		Nick Dornan	Matt Palmer	Garry Cain (FFP); Bob Marshall (NCP); Jodie Yardley (ON)
Willagee	Labor	**Alan Carpenter**	Bob Smith		Hsien Harper	Rosemary Lorrimar	Paul Byrnes (FFP); Bill Cook (ON); Trish Phelan (Ind); Andrew Sullivan (Ind)
Yokine	Labor	**Bob Kucera**	Dave Vos		Heather Aquilina	Warick Smith	Frank Feher (ON); Emily Hopkinson (FFP); Jean Thornton (Ind)

== Legislative Council ==
Sitting members are shown in bold text. Tickets that elected at least one MLC are highlighted in the relevant colour. Successful candidates are identified by an asterisk (*).

=== Agricultural ===
Five seats were up for election. The Labor Party was defending one seat. The Liberal Party was defending one seat. The National Party was defending one seat. The Greens were defending one seat. One Nation was defending one seat.

Labor candidates	Liberal candidates	National candidates	Greens candidates	CDP candidates	One Nation candidates
1. **Kim Chance***; 2. Tim Daly; 3. Darren West	1. **Bruce Donaldson***; 2. Anthony Fels*; 3. Margaret Rowe*; 4. Brian Ellis	1. **Murray Criddle***; 2. Wendy Duncan; 3. Chris Nelson; 4. Denise Clydesdale-Gebert	1. **Dee Margetts**; 2. Basil Schur	1. Lachlan Dunjey; 2. Alistair McNabb	1. Ron McLean; 2. Barry Strahan; 3. Michael Fallis
New Country candidates	Democrats candidates	Family First candidates	LFF candidates	CEC candidates	PHS candidates
1. **Frank Hough**; 2. Colin Nicholl; 3. Frank Marley	1. Anthony Bennell; 2. David Thackrah	1. Nigel Irvine; 2. Heidi Farhi	1. Peter Theobald; 2. Joy Richardson	1. Jean Robinson; 2. Stuart Smith	1. John Darby; 2. Paul Shann
Ungrouped candidates					
Roy Duncanson					

=== East Metropolitan ===
Five seats were up for election. The Labor Party was defending three seats. The Liberal Party was defending two seats.

Labor candidates	Liberal candidates	Greens candidates	CDP candidates	One Nation candidates	Family First candidates
1. **Ljiljanna Ravlich***; 2. **Nick Griffiths***; 3. **Louise Pratt***; 4. Batong Pham; 5. Todd Gogol; 6. Rita Saffioti	1. Helen Morton*; 2. Donna Taylor*; 3. Bill Munro	1. Lee Bell; 2. Alison Xamon	1. Vivian Hill; 2. Gerard Goiran	1. James Hopkinson; 2. Maureen Gordon	1. Jim McCourt; 2. David Bolt
New Country candidates	Democrats candidates	LFF candidates	PHS candidates	Group B candidates	Ungrouped candidates
1. Laurissa Lockett; 2. John Mania	1. Robyn Danski; 2. Paul McCutcheon	1. Sarah Berry; 2. Claire Hart	1. Colin Ross; 2. Avril Ross	1. Annolies Truman; 2. Emma Clancy	John Button; Daniel Stevens (CEC); John Tucak; Sylvia Yarnda Mnyirrinna

=== Mining and Pastoral ===
Five seats were up for election. The Labor Party was defending two seats. The Liberal Party was defending one seat. The Greens were defending one seat. One Nation was defending one seat.

Labor candidates	Liberal candidates	Greens candidates	CDP candidates	One Nation candidates	Democrats candidates
1. Shelley Archer*; 2. **Jon Ford***; 3. Vince Catania*; 4. Shelley Eaton; 5. Michael Anderton; 6. Stephen Dawson	1. **Norman Moore***; 2. Ken Baston*; 3. Brett Nazzari; 4. John Fawcett; 5. Greg Smith	1. **Robin Chapple**; 2. Kado Muir	1. Chris Lakay; 2. Derk Gans	1. Irene Wyborn; 2. Neville Smith	1. Don Hoddy; 2. Peter Crawford
LFF candidates	PHS candidates	Fischer candidates	Ungrouped candidates		
1. Karen Jones; 2. Alexandra O'Shaughnessy	1. Henry Beal; 2. Jim Jennings	1. **John Fischer**; 2. Graeme Campbell	Brian Lewis (CEC); Valerie McCooke		

=== North Metropolitan ===
Seven seats were up for election. The Labor Party was defending three seats. The Liberal Party was defending three seats. The Greens were defending one seat.

Labor candidates	Liberal candidates	Greens candidates	CDP candidates	One Nation candidates	Family First candidates
1. **Ed Dermer***; 2. **Ken Travers***; 3. **Graham Giffard***; 4. Daniel Smith; 5. Carolyn Burton; 6. Daniel Mycyk	1. **George Cash***; 2. Peter Collier*; 3. **Ray Halligan***; 4. David Clyne; 5. Rod Webb	1. **Giz Watson***; 2. Cameron Poustie; 3. Brenda Roy	1. Dwight Randall; 2. Raymond Moran	1. George Gault; 2. Alex Patrick	1. Michelle Bolt; 2. Symia Hopkinson
Democrats candidates	LFF candidates	PHS candidates	Group D candidates	Ungrouped candidates	
1. Pat Olver; 2. Giuseppe Coletti	1. Renae Dunkley; 2. Bill Wormald	1. Kareen Squires; 2. Patricia Edmonds	1. Nikki Ulasowski; 2. Don Cowan	Kevin Cloghan; Malcolm Mummery	

=== South Metropolitan ===
Five seats were up for election. The Labor Party was defending two seats. The Liberal Party was defending two seats. The Greens were defending one seat.

Labor candidates	Liberal candidates	Greens candidates	CDP candidates	One Nation candidates	Democrats candidates
1. **Kate Doust***; 2. **Sue Ellery***; 3. Sheila Mills*; 4. David Vallelonga; 5. David Klemm; 6. Daniel Guise	1. **Simon O'Brien***; 2. **Barbara Scott***; 3. Roger Nicholls; 4. Alison Gibson; 5. Jane Blake	1. **Lynn MacLaren**; 2. Nicola Paris	1. Peter Watt; 2. Venetia Turkington	1. Teresa van Lieshout; 2. Neil Gilmour	1. Jason Meotti; 2. Andrew Ingram
Family First candidates	LFF candidates	PHS candidates	FHS candidates	Group K candidates	Ungrouped candidates
1. Beverley Custers; 2. Paul Dean-Smith	1. Vicky Taylor; 2. Louise Wormald	1. Neil Marrett; 2. Vicki Doutch	1. Murray McKay; 2. Giovanni Rotondella	1. Ian Jamieson; 2. Sam Wainwright	Won Choi; Steven Milianku; Doug Thorp; Jakica Zaknic

=== South West ===
Seven seats were up for election. The Labor Party was defending two seats. The Liberal Party was defending three seats. The Greens were defending one seat. One Nation was defending one seat.

Labor candidates	Liberal candidates	National candidates	Greens candidates	CDP candidates	One Nation candidates
1. **Adele Farina***; 2. Sally Talbot*; 3. Matt Benson-Lidholm*; 4. Liam Costello; 5. Jullianne Slater; 6. Jasper Trendall	1. **Barry House***; 2. **Robyn McSweeney***; 3. Nigel Hallett*; 4. Ken Robinson; 5. Kerrol Gildersleeve; 6. Philippa Reid; 7. Narelle King	1. Steve Dilley; 2. Colin Holt	1. Paul Llewellyn*; 2. Kingsley Gibson	1. Justin Moseley; 2. Kerry Watterson	1. Alan Giorgi; 2. Kenneth Waters
New Country candidates	Democrats candidates	Family First candidates	LFF candidates	PHS candidates	Ungrouped candidates
1. **Paddy Embry**; 2. Frances Chester	1. Adam Welch; 2. John Partridge	1. Linda Rose; 2. Coleen Heine	1. June Bennett; 2. Judy Pryer	1. Ray Goodwin; 2. Val Goodwin	Ken Gunson

== See also ==
- Members of the Western Australian Legislative Assembly, 2001–2005
- Members of the Western Australian Legislative Assembly, 2005–2008
- Members of the Western Australian Legislative Council, 2001–2005
- Members of the Western Australian Legislative Council, 2005–2009
- 2005 Western Australian state election
