= Electoral results for the district of Swan Hills =

Western Australian district election results

This is a list of electoral results for the electoral district of Swan Hills in Western Australian state elections.

== Members for Swan Hills ==
Member	Party	Term
Gavan Troy	Labor	1989–1993
June van de Klashorst	Liberal	1993–2001
Jaye Radisich	Labor	2001–2008
Frank Alban	Liberal	2008–2017
Jessica Shaw	Labor	2017–present

== Election results ==
=== Elections in the 2020s ===
2025 Western Australian state election: Swan Hills
Party	Candidate	Votes	%	±%
Labor	Michelle Maynard	11,839	43.2	−27.5
Liberal	Rod Henderson	6,883	25.1	+6.7
Greens	Christopher Poulton	2,760	10.1	+6.1
National	Ben Giblett	2,174	7.9	+7.9
One Nation	Scott Wilkinson	2,115	7.7	+7.7
Christians	Magdeleen Strauss	993	3.6	+0.9
Shooters, Fishers, Farmers	Ross Williamson	617	2.3	+2.3
Total formal votes		27,381	95.1	−0.3
Informal votes		1,421	4.9	+0.3
Turnout		28,802	86.2	+9.3
Two-party-preferred result
Labor	Michelle Maynard	15,979	58.4	−18.8
Liberal	Rod Henderson	11,375	41.6	+18.8
Labor hold		Swing	−18.8	

2021 Western Australian state election: Swan Hills
Party	Candidate	Votes	%	±%
Labor	Jessica Shaw	17,255	69.8	+20.4
Liberal	Rod Henderson	4,571	18.5	−9.6
Greens	Melanye Wawrik	1,189	4.8	−2.7
No Mandatory Vaccination	Timothy Bunton	782	3.2	+3.2
Christians	Magdeleen Strauss	675	2.7	+2.5
WAxit	Asif Ali	256	1.0	−0.6
Total formal votes		24,728	95.2	−0.5
Informal votes		1,245	4.8	+0.5
Turnout		25,973	85.8	+8.1
Two-party-preferred result
Labor	Jessica Shaw	19,069	77.1	+15.0
Liberal	Rod Henderson	5,655	22.9	−15.0
Labor hold		Swing	+15.0	

=== Elections in the 2010s ===
2017 Western Australian state election: Swan Hills
Party	Candidate	Votes	%	±%
Labor	Jessica Shaw	14,335	52.2	+11.8
Liberal	Frank Alban	7,388	26.9	−22.2
One Nation	Sandra Old	3,011	11.0	+11.0
Greens	Evan Webb	1,921	7.0	+0.2
Micro Business	Lucky Singh	512	1.9	+1.9
Matheson for WA	Danusha Bhowaniah	275	1.0	+1.0
Total formal votes		27,442	95.7	+1.3
Informal votes		1,231	4.3	−1.3
Turnout		28,673	88.0	+8.0
Two-party-preferred result
Labor	Jessica Shaw	17,703	64.5	+18.3
Liberal	Frank Alban	9,734	35.5	−18.3
Labor gain from Liberal		Swing	+18.3	

2013 Western Australian state election: Swan Hills
Party	Candidate	Votes	%	±%
Liberal	Frank Alban	11,446	50.7	+5.5
Labor	Ian Radisich	8,159	36.1	+3.8
Greens	Dominique Lieb	2,028	9.0	–7.9
Christians	John Tapley	481	2.1	–0.7
Family First	Kyran Sharrin	460	2.0	–0.7
Total formal votes		22,574	94.5	−0.2
Informal votes		1,312	5.5	+0.2
Turnout		23,886	91.4	
Two-party-preferred result
Liberal	Frank Alban	12,610	55.9	+2.4
Labor	Ian Radisich	9,958	44.1	–2.4
Liberal hold		Swing	+2.4	

=== Elections in the 2000s ===
2008 Western Australian state election: Swan Hills
Party	Candidate	Votes	%	±%
Liberal	Frank Alban	9,589	45.5	+6.3
Labor	Graham Giffard	7,183	34.1	−11.1
Greens	Jenni Bowman	3,009	14.3	+7.3
Family First	Craig Watson	734	3.5	+1.9
Christian Democrats	Keith Blok	540	2.6	+0.1
Total formal votes		21,055	94.8	−0.6
Informal votes		1,158	5.2	+0.6
Turnout		22,213	89.6	
Two-party-preferred result
Liberal	Frank Alban	11,268	53.5	+7.1
Labor	Graham Giffard	9,777	46.5	−7.1
Liberal gain from Labor		Swing	+7.1	

2005 Western Australian state election: Swan Hills
Party	Candidate	Votes	%	±%
Labor	Jaye Radisich	10,703	45.0	+14.4
Liberal	Steve Blizard	9,205	38.7	+2.1
Greens	Sharon Davies	1,789	7.5	−4.4
Christian Democrats	Eric Miller	568	2.4	+2.4
Family First	Ian Saladine	362	1.5	+1.5
One Nation	David Gunnyon	348	1.5	−9.7
Independent	Mike Stoddart	346	1.5	+1.5
Independent	Alison Hornsey	294	1.2	+1.2
Independent	Ross Gundry	144	0.6	+0.6
Total formal votes		23,759	95.4	−0.6
Informal votes		1,135	4.6	+0.6
Turnout		24,894	92.3	
Two-party-preferred result
Labor	Jaye Radisich	12,782	53.8	+3.5
Liberal	Steve Blizard	10,958	46.2	−3.5
Labor hold		Swing	+3.5	

2001 Western Australian state election: Swan Hills
Party	Candidate	Votes	%	±%
Liberal	June van de Klashorst	9,032	35.3	−15.9
Labor	Jaye Radisich	8,319	32.5	+5.4
Greens	Sharon Davies	3,048	11.9	+1.1
One Nation	Ian Whittaker	2,798	10.9	+10.9
Liberals for Forests	John Daw	1,422	5.6	+5.6
Democrats	Michael Barrett	967	3.8	−4.3
Total formal votes		25,586	95.9	−0.2
Informal votes		1,104	4.1	+0.2
Turnout		26,690	92.7	
Two-party-preferred result
Labor	Jaye Radisich	13,182	52.0	+11.7
Liberal	June van de Klashorst	12,145	48.0	−11.7
Labor gain from Liberal		Swing	+11.7	

=== Elections in the 1990s ===
1996 Western Australian state election: Swan Hills
Party	Candidate	Votes	%	±%
Liberal	June van de Klashorst	10,756	51.2	+5.6
Labor	Peter Murray	5,701	27.1	−3.6
Greens	Kathryn Driver	2,266	10.8	+4.2
Democrats	Bobbie Moxham	1,696	8.1	+4.3
Reform	David Gunnyon	589	2.8	+2.8
Total formal votes		21,008	96.1	+0.1
Informal votes		862	3.9	−0.1
Turnout		21,870	91.7	
Two-party-preferred result
Liberal	June van de Klashorst	12,505	59.7	+0.2
Labor	Peter Murray	8,430	40.3	−0.2
Liberal hold		Swing	+0.2	

1993 Western Australian state election: Swan Hills
Party	Candidate	Votes	%	±%
Liberal	June van de Klashorst	9,062	41.6	−1.1
Labor	Clyde Bevan	8,084	37.2	−11.3
Greens	Philip Bourgault Du Coudray	1,392	6.4	+6.4
National	James Lee	1,079	5.0	+5.0
Democrats	Kingsley Dunstan	891	4.1	+4.1
Independent	Kevin Oliver	754	3.5	+3.5
Independent	Diane Parker	499	2.3	+2.3
Total formal votes		21,761	95.2	+2.6
Informal votes		1,086	4.8	−2.6
Turnout		22,847	93.8	+2.7
Two-party-preferred result
Liberal	June van de Klashorst	11,888	54.6	+6.1
Labor	Clyde Bevan	9,873	45.4	−6.1
Liberal gain from Labor		Swing	+6.1	

=== Elections in the 1980s ===
1989 Western Australian state election: Swan Hills
Party	Candidate	Votes	%	±%
Labor	Gavan Troy	8,532	48.5	−10.7
Liberal	Neil Oliver	7,526	42.7	+4.4
Grey Power	Eric Ridgway	1,547	8.8	+8.8
Total formal votes		17,605	92.6	
Informal votes		1,414	7.4	
Turnout		19,019	91.1	
Two-party-preferred result
Labor	Gavan Troy	9,067	51.5	−9.0
Liberal	Neil Oliver	8,538	48.5	+9.0
Labor hold		Swing	−9.0	
