= Results of the 2005 Western Australian state election (Legislative Assembly) =

Western Australian state election, 26 February 2005 Legislative Assembly << 2001–2008 >>
Enrolled voters	1,259,262				
Votes cast	1,131,265		Turnout	89.84%	–0.72%
Informal votes	59,312		Informal	5.24%	+0.70%
Summary of votes by party
Party	Primary votes	%	Swing	Seats	Change
Labor	448,956	41.88%	+4.65%	32	± 0
Liberal	382,014	35.64%	+4.48%	18	+ 2
Greens	81,113	7.57%	+0.30%	0	± 0
National	39,548	3.69%	+0.43%	5	± 0
Christian Democrats	31,445	2.93%	+1.97%	0	± 0
Family First	21,701	2.02%	+2.02%	0	± 0
One Nation	17,580	1.64%	–7.94%	0	± 0
Other parties	4,997	0.46%	–0.04%	0	± 0
Independent^{[1]}	44,599	4.16%	–1.41%	2	– 2
Total	1,071,953			57	
Two-party-preferred
Labor	559,679	52.28%	–0.65%		
Liberal/National	510,937	47.72%	+0.65%		

This is a list of electoral district results of the 2005 Western Australian election.

== Results by electoral district ==
=== Albany ===
2005 Western Australian state election: Albany
Party	Candidate	Votes	%	±%
Labor	Peter Watson	5,569	43.6	+12.0
Liberal	Andrew Partington	4,773	37.3	+4.3
National	Beverley Ford	651	5.1	+5.1
Greens	Tony Evers	629	4.9	−3.5
Christian Democrats	Greg Basden	453	3.5	+3.5
Family First	Colin Pyle	371	2.9	+2.9
One Nation	Brian Burns	340	2.7	−13.6
Total formal votes		12,786	95.8	+0.1
Informal votes		561	4.2	−0.1
Turnout		13,347	91.6	
Two-party-preferred result
Labor	Peter Watson	6,564	51.4	−2.3
Liberal	Andrew Partington	6,206	48.6	+2.3
Labor hold		Swing	−2.3	

=== Alfred Cove ===
2005 Western Australian state election: Alfred Cove
Party	Candidate	Votes	%	±%
Liberal	Graham Kierath	9,424	37.9	+4.1
Independent	Janet Woollard	5,952	24.0	+5.7
Labor	Michael Kane	5,675	22.8	+19.0
Independent	Katherine Jackson	1,686	6.8	+6.8
Greens	Scott Ryan	1,580	6.4	−0.6
Christian Democrats	William Suseno	525	2.1	+0.5
Total formal votes		24,842	96.5	−0.1
Informal votes		902	3.5	+0.1
Turnout		25,744	91.9	
Two-candidate-preferred result
Independent	Janet Woollard	13,546	54.6	−3.6
Liberal	Graham Kierath	11,278	45.4	+3.6
Independent hold		Swing	−3.6	

=== Armadale ===
2005 Western Australian state election: Armadale
Party	Candidate	Votes	%	±%
Labor	Alannah MacTiernan	13,095	55.0	+10.0
Liberal	Diane Johnson	6,250	26.2	+23.9
Christian Democrats	Madeleine Goiran	1,317	5.5	−0.5
Greens	Jason Brennan	1,171	4.9	−1.2
Family First	John Coules	757	3.2	+3.2
One Nation	Colin Butler	700	2.9	−10.6
Independent	Bret Busby	444	1.9	+1.9
Citizens Electoral Council	Joyce Richards	92	0.4	+0.4
Total formal votes		23,826	93.8	−0.6
Informal votes		1,570	6.2	+0.6
Turnout		25,396	90.4	
Two-party-preferred result
Labor	Alannah MacTiernan	14,993	63.0	+6.4
Liberal	Diane Johnson	8,799	37.0	+37.0
Labor hold		Swing	+6.4	

=== Avon ===
2005 Western Australian state election: Avon
Party	Candidate	Votes	%	±%
National	Max Trenorden	7,469	63.8	+36.9
Labor	Gerry Sturman	2,650	22.6	+0.8
Greens	Adrian Price	686	5.9	+1.4
One Nation	Boyd Martin	470	4.0	−15.1
Christian Democrats	Bob Adair	278	2.4	+2.4
Citizens Electoral Council	Ron McLean	149	1.3	+1.3
Total formal votes		11,702	95.3	−0.2
Informal votes		571	4.7	+0.2
Turnout		12,273	90.9	
Two-party-preferred result
National	Max Trenorden	8,429	72.1	+14.2
Labor	Gerry Sturman	3,266	27.9	−14.2
National hold		Swing	+14.2	

=== Balcatta ===
2005 Western Australian state election: Balcatta
Party	Candidate	Votes	%	±%
Labor	John Kobelke	12,489	52.2	+3.4
Liberal	Melinda Poor	8,028	33.6	+2.5
Greens	Kayt Davies	2,122	8.9	+2.0
Christian Democrats	Michael Ewers	1,278	5.3	+5.3
Total formal votes		23,917	93.6	+0.4
Informal votes		1,639	6.4	−0.4
Turnout		25,556	89.9	
Two-party-preferred result
Labor	John Kobelke	14,306	59.9	−1.0
Liberal	Melinda Poor	9,575	40.1	+1.0
Labor hold		Swing	−1.0	

=== Ballajura ===
2005 Western Australian state election: Ballajura
Party	Candidate	Votes	%	±%
Labor	John D'Orazio	13,094	56.1	+9.1
Liberal	David Maxwell	6,883	29.5	−9.2
Greens	Michael Boswell	1,183	5.1	+1.1
Christian Democrats	Allan Ribbons	959	4.1	+1.9
Family First	John Clifford	816	3.5	+3.5
One Nation	Gary Evans	385	1.7	−4.0
Total formal votes		23,320	93.7	−1.4
Informal votes		1,575	6.3	+1.4
Turnout		24,895	92.1	
Two-party-preferred result
Labor	John D'Orazio	14,809	63.5	+8.7
Liberal	David Maxwell	8,506	36.5	−8.7
Labor hold		Swing	+8.7	

=== Bassendean ===
2005 Western Australian state election: Bassendean
Party	Candidate	Votes	%	±%
Labor	Martin Whitely	12,052	52.9	−2.3
Liberal	Michelle Stubbs	6,283	27.6	+7.0
Greens	Gemma Carter	1,960	8.6	+0.5
Family First	Peter Clifford	1,160	5.1	+5.1
Christian Democrats	Paul Mewhor	778	3.4	+0.5
One Nation	Graeme Harris	533	2.3	−7.0
Total formal votes		22,766	93.3	−0.4
Informal votes		1,630	6.7	+0.4
Turnout		24,396	91.2	
Two-party-preferred result
Labor	Martin Whitely	14,379	63.7	−5.0
Liberal	Michelle Stubbs	8,208	36.3	+5.0
Labor hold		Swing	−5.0	

=== Belmont ===
2005 Western Australian state election: Belmont
Party	Candidate	Votes	%	±%
Labor	Eric Ripper	12,162	52.94	+1.13
Liberal	Glenys Godfrey	7,231	31.47	+7.03
Greens	Steve Wolff	1,835	7.99	+2.28
Christian Democrats	Gwen Hamence	975	4.24	+1.17
One Nation	Bill Gaugg	772	3.36	–7.47
Total formal votes		22,975	94.49	+0.42
Informal votes		1,341	5.51	–0.42
Turnout		24,316	90.13	–0.71
Two-party-preferred result
Labor	Eric Ripper	13,952	60.81	–3.91
Liberal	Glenys Godfrey	8,992	39.19	+3.91
Labor hold		Swing	–3.91	

=== Bunbury ===
2005 Western Australian state election: Bunbury
Party	Candidate	Votes	%	±%
Liberal	John Castrilli	5,478	43.1	+4.4
Labor	Tony Dean	5,344	42.0	+7.8
Greens	Joshua Ledger	746	5.9	−0.5
Family First	Mandy Roberts	426	3.3	+3.3
One Nation	Brian McRae	300	2.4	−7.9
Independent	Jodie Murray	188	1.5	+1.5
Christian Democrats	Shane Flanegan	139	1.1	+1.1
Independent	Chris Cox	102	0.8	+0.8
Total formal votes		12,723	95.2	−0.3
Informal votes		646	4.8	+0.3
Turnout		13,369	90.9	
Two-party-preferred result
Liberal	John Castrilli	6,397	50.4	+0.6
Labor	Tony Dean	6,294	49.6	−0.6
Liberal gain from Labor		Swing	+0.6	

=== Capel ===
2005 Western Australian state election: Capel
Party	Candidate	Votes	%	±%
Liberal	Steve Thomas	5,791	44.2	+11.7
Labor	John Mondy	3,784	28.9	+2.9
National	Murray Scott	1,190	9.1	−5.1
Greens	Richard Chapman	1,069	8.2	−0.3
Family First	Marilyn Shraga	736	5.6	+5.6
One Nation	Carol Johnson	370	2.8	−11.5
Christian Democrats	Trista Palmer	166	1.3	+1.3
Total formal votes		13,106	94.5	−1.5
Informal votes		758	5.5	+1.5
Turnout		13,864	89.0	
Two-party-preferred result
Liberal	Steve Thomas	7,757	59.2	+2.7
Labor	John Mondy	5,335	40.8	−2.7
Liberal hold		Swing	+2.7	

=== Carine ===
2005 Western Australian state election: Carine
Party	Candidate	Votes	%	±%
Liberal	Katie Hodson-Thomas	11,814	48.3	+7.3
Labor	Damien Parry	8,772	35.9	+6.8
Greens	Ross Copeland	2,786	11.4	+3.8
Christian Democrats	Bruce Richards	1,070	4.4	+2.5
Total formal votes		24,442	95.7	−0.9
Informal votes		1,103	4.3	+0.9
Turnout		25,545	90.9	
Two-party-preferred result
Liberal	Katie Hodson-Thomas	13,360	54.7	−0.4
Labor	Damien Parry	11,070	45.3	+0.4
Liberal hold		Swing	−0.4	

=== Central Kimberley-Pilbara ===
2005 Western Australian state election: Central Kimberley-Pilbara
Party	Candidate	Votes	%	±%
Labor	Tom Stephens	4,369	50.1	+13.9
Liberal	Trona Young	2,388	27.4	+12.2
Greens	Kelly Howlett	786	9.0	+7.7
Independent	Barry Taylor	738	8.5	+8.5
Independent	Paul Asplin	178	2.0	+2.0
One Nation	Gavin Ness	135	1.5	–5.7
Christian Democrats	Jason Matthews	123	1.4	+1.4
Total formal votes		8,717	95.0	−0.8
Informal votes		458	5.0	+0.8
Turnout		9,174	68.6	
Two-party-preferred result
Labor	Tom Stephens	5,542	63.6	+4.2
Liberal	Trona Young	3,168	36.4	−4.2
Labor gain from Independent		Swing	+4.2	

=== Churchlands ===
2005 Western Australian state election: Churchlands
Party	Candidate	Votes	%	±%
Independent	Liz Constable	10,612	43.7	+10.7
Liberal	Greg Preston	5,817	23.9	−5.7
Labor	Tony Walker	5,335	22.0	−0.7
Greens	Sonja Lundie-Jenkins	1,851	7.6	+0.9
Christian Democrats	Jennifer Whately	684	2.8	+0.8
Total formal votes		24,299	96.9	+0.1
Informal votes		780	3.1	−0.1
Turnout		25,079	89.90	
Two-candidate-preferred result
Independent	Liz Constable	17,387	71.6	+0.7
Labor	Tony Walker	6,903	28.4	+28.4
Independent hold		Swing	+0.7	

=== Cockburn ===
2005 Western Australian state election: Cockburn
Party	Candidate	Votes	%	±%
Labor	Fran Logan	12,570	55.3	+0.6
Liberal	John Jamieson	5,289	23.3	+2.8
Greens	Anne Otness	1,547	6.8	−3.3
Family First	Damon Fowler	1,278	5.6	+5.6
Independent	Robyn Scherr	804	3.5	+3.5
One Nation	Carol Teather	650	2.9	−7.1
Christian Democrats	Bill Heggers	605	2.7	+2.7
Total formal votes		22,743	93.0	−1.9
Informal votes		1,722	7.0	+1.9
Turnout		24,465	90.2	
Two-party-preferred result
Labor	Fran Logan	15,084	66.4	−3.0
Liberal	John Jamieson	7,640	33.6	+3.0
Labor hold		Swing	−3.0	

=== Collie-Wellington ===
2005 Western Australian state election: Collie-Wellington
Party	Candidate	Votes	%	±%
Labor	Mick Murray	6,798	50.5	+13.0
Liberal	Craig Carbone	3,741	27.8	+3.9
National	Neale Armstrong	1,517	11.3	+0.6
Greens	David Paris	432	3.2	+0.8
One Nation	Kevin Gordon	283	2.1	−13.8
Family First	Edward Dabrowski	282	2.1	+2.1
Independent	Gary Murrihy	222	1.6	+1.6
Christian Democrats	Tanya Dunjey	110	0.8	+0.8
New Country	Martha Window	70	0.5	+0.5
Total formal votes		13,455	94.4	−0.7
Informal votes		798	5.6	+0.7
Turnout		14,253	92.7	
Two-party-preferred result
Labor	Mick Murray	7,962	59.3	+6.7
Liberal	Craig Carbone	5,463	40.7	−6.7
Labor hold		Swing	+6.7	

=== Cottesloe ===
2005 Western Australian state election: Cottesloe
Party	Candidate	Votes	%	±%
Liberal	Colin Barnett	13,446	55.7	+4.8
Labor	Owen Whittle	5,965	24.7	+2.5
Greens	Steve Walker	3,997	16.5	+3.1
Christian Democrats	Stuart Chapman	750	3.1	+3.0
Total formal votes		24,158	96.6	−0.7
Informal votes		857	3.4	+0.7
Turnout		25,015	89.7	
Two-party-preferred result
Liberal	Colin Barnett	14,910	61.7	−0.6
Labor	Owen Whittle	9,245	38.3	+0.6
Liberal hold		Swing	−0.6	

=== Darling Range ===
2005 Western Australian state election: Darling Range
Party	Candidate	Votes	%	±%
Liberal	John Day	11,994	46.3	+10.0
Labor	Geoff Stallard	9,768	37.7	+6.5
Greens	Margo Beilby	1,843	7.1	−2.0
Christian Democrats	Rob Merrells	930	3.6	+3.0
Family First	Matthew Lague	765	3.0	+3.0
One Nation	Sam Dacheff	616	2.4	−7.7
Total formal votes		25,916	95.6	−0.4
Informal votes		1,188	4.4	+0.4
Turnout		27,104	92.3	
Two-party-preferred result
Liberal	John Day	13,759	53.1	+2.5
Labor	Geoff Stallard	12,143	46.9	−2.5
Liberal hold		Swing	+2.5	

=== Dawesville ===
2005 Western Australian state election: Dawesville
Party	Candidate	Votes	%	±%
Liberal	Kim Hames	5,896	44.5	−1.9
Labor	Lynn Rodgers	5,165	39.0	+6.4
National	Vern Goff	894	6.8	+6.8
Greens	Clare Nunan	600	4.5	−2.0
Family First	Julie Westbrook	364	2.7	+2.7
One Nation	Derek Withers	213	1.6	−9.8
Christian Democrats	Keith Blok	110	0.8	+0.8
Total formal votes		13,242	95.3	−1.6
Informal votes		656	4.7	+1.6
Turnout		13,898	90.3	
Two-party-preferred result
Liberal	Kim Hames	7,168	54.1	−3.7
Labor	Lynn Rodgers	6,070	45.9	+3.7
Liberal hold		Swing	−3.7	

=== Fremantle ===
2005 Western Australian state election: Fremantle
Party	Candidate	Votes	%	±%
Labor	Jim McGinty	9,803	44.9	−3.3
Liberal	Rita Scolaro	5,800	26.6	+2.4
Greens	Jim Scott	3,457	15.8	−0.7
Independent	Adele Carles	1,256	5.8	+5.8
Independent	Ian Muir	436	2.0	+2.0
Family First	Paul Thurbon	387	1.8	+1.8
Christian Democrats	Michelle Shave	359	1.6	+1.6
One Nation	Kerry-Ann Winmar	223	1.0	−4.0
Independent	Lionel Richards	111	0.5	+0.5
Total formal votes		21,832	91.7	−1.3
Informal votes		1,982	8.3	+1.3
Turnout		23,814	89.3	
Two-party-preferred result
Labor	Jim McGinty	14,043	64.4	−3.3
Liberal	Rita Scolaro	7,763	35.6	+3.3
Labor hold		Swing	−3.3	

=== Geraldton ===
2005 Western Australian state election: Geraldton
Party	Candidate	Votes	%	±%
Labor	Shane Hill	5,252	44.5	+17.8
Liberal	Kevin Giudice	4,603	39.0	+12.8
Greens	Paul Connolly	581	4.9	+4.9
National	Sally Bennison	542	4.6	−4.4
Christian Democrats	Mac Forsyth	430	3.6	+3.6
One Nation	Ross Paravicini	375	3.2	−18.6
Citizens Electoral Council	Basil Atkins	29	0.2	+0.2
Total formal votes		11,812	94.8	−0.7
Informal votes		642	5.2	+0.7
Turnout		12,454	88.0	
Two-party-preferred result
Labor	Shane Hill	6,117	52.1	−0.6
Liberal	Kevin Giudice	5,627	47.9	+0.6
Labor hold		Swing	−0.6	

=== Girrawheen ===
2005 Western Australian state election: Girrawheen
Party	Candidate	Votes	%	±%
Labor	Margaret Quirk	11,111	52.3	−5.6
Liberal	John Halligan	3,875	18.2	−3.3
Independent	Jon Kelly	3,265	15.4	+15.4
Greens	Tamara Desiatov	984	4.6	−0.6
Family First	George Georgis	880	4.1	+4.1
Christian Democrats	Richard Leeder	623	2.9	+2.9
One Nation	Leon McKenzie	286	1.3	−6.9
Independent	Keith Mynard	227	1.1	−2.5
Total formal votes		21,251	91.5	−1.1
Informal votes		1,963	8.5	+1.1
Turnout		23,214	89.3	
Two-party-preferred result
Labor	Margaret Quirk	15,577	73.4	+2.4
Liberal	John Halligan	5,656	26.6	−2.4
Labor hold		Swing	+2.4	

=== Greenough ===
2005 Western Australian state election: Greenough
Party	Candidate	Votes	%	±%
Liberal	Jamie Edwards	4,400	38.7	+2.9
National	Grant Woodhams	2,967	26.1	+15.4
Labor	John Hart	2,599	22.9	+3.5
Greens	Tonya Jensen	546	4.8	+4.6
One Nation	Pauline Anderson	535	4.7	−23.1
Christian Democrats	Steve Fletcher	309	2.7	+2.7
Total formal votes		11,356	95.7	−1.3
Informal votes		515	4.3	+1.3
Turnout		11,871	88.5	
Notional two-party-preferred count
National	Grant Woodhams	7,717	68.6	+7.9
Labor	John Hart	3,540	31.4	−7.9
Two-candidate-preferred result
National	Grant Woodhams	5,742	51.3	+51.3
Liberal	Jamie Edwards	5,460	48.7	−11.9
National gain from Liberal		Swing	N/A	

=== Hillarys ===
2005 Western Australian state election: Hillarys
Party	Candidate	Votes	%	±%
Liberal	Rob Johnson	11,462	46.2	+3.7
Labor	Anna Spadaccini	8,881	35.8	+4.6
Greens	Chris Twomey	2,025	8.2	−0.6
Family First	Ken Loughton	861	3.5	+3.5
Independent	John Bombak	808	3.3	+3.3
Christian Democrats	Perry McKerlie	760	3.1	+0.4
Total formal votes		24,797	95.3	−0.6
Informal votes		1,220	4.7	+0.6
Turnout		26,017	91.5	
Two-party-preferred result
Liberal	Rob Johnson	13,428	54.2	−0.2
Labor	Anna Spadaccini	11,359	45.8	+0.2
Liberal hold		Swing	−0.2	

=== Joondalup ===
2005 Western Australian state election: Joondalup
Party	Candidate	Votes	%	±%
Labor	Tony O'Gorman	10,085	44.9	+6.0
Liberal	Dean Solly	8,604	38.3	+1.9
Greens	Leon van der Linde	1,625	7.2	−2.4
Independent	Michael Clancy	902	4.0	+4.0
Family First	Fred Hay	725	3.2	+3.2
Christian Democrats	Helen Sawyer	528	2.3	−0.9
Total formal votes		22,469	94.9	−0.2
Informal votes		1,206	5.1	+0.2
Turnout		23,675	90.9	
Two-party-preferred result
Labor	Tony O'Gorman	11,960	53.3	+0.2
Liberal	Dean Solly	10,492	46.7	−0.2
Labor hold		Swing	+0.2	

=== Kalgoorlie ===
2005 Western Australian state election: Kalgoorlie
Party	Candidate	Votes	%	±%
Liberal	Matt Birney	5,579	53.1	+14.5
Labor	James Donnelly	3,629	34.6	−4.4
Greens	Peter Gurger	434	4.1	+0.4
Independent	Leigh Varis Beswick	424	4.0	+4.0
One Nation	Robin Scott	228	2.2	−8.4
Christian Democrats	Gregory Smart	205	2.0	+2.0
Total formal votes		10,499	95.9	0.0
Informal votes		448	4.1	0.0
Turnout		10,947	85.3	
Two-party-preferred result
Liberal	Matt Birney	6,260	59.6	+8.6
Labor	James Donnelly	4,236	40.4	−8.6
Liberal hold		Swing	+8.6	

=== Kenwick ===
2005 Western Australian state election: Kenwick
Party	Candidate	Votes	%	±%
Labor	Sheila McHale	12,261	54.2	+5.9
Liberal	John Kennebury	6,095	26.9	+2.0
Greens	Camille Inifer	1,518	6.7	+0.9
One Nation	Lloyd Boon	962	4.3	−7.5
Christian Democrats	Lukas Butler	916	4.0	+0.3
Family First	Moyna Rapp	877	3.9	+3.9
Total formal votes		22,629	93.2	−0.4
Informal votes		1,664	6.8	+0.4
Turnout		24,293	89.3	
Two-party-preferred result
Labor	Sheila McHale	14,376	63.6	+0.4
Liberal	John Kennebury	8,228	36.4	−0.4
Labor hold		Swing	+0.4	

=== Kimberley ===
2005 Western Australian state election: Kimberley
Party	Candidate	Votes	%	±%
Labor	Carol Martin	3,473	39.3	−0.4
Liberal	Ron Johnston	3,469	39.2	+21.9
Greens	Pat Lowe	1,298	14.7	+10.0
Independent	Peter Matsumoto	389	4.4	+4.4
One Nation	Maz Fiannaca	110	1.2	−10.1
Christian Democrats	Victoria Rafferty	106	1.2	+1.2
Total formal votes		8,845	95.5	−0.1
Informal votes		416	4.5	+0.1
Turnout		9,261	70.6	
Two-party-preferred result
Labor	Carol Martin	4,717	53.3	−5.2
Liberal	Ron Johnston	4,127	46.7	+5.2
Labor hold		Swing	−5.2	

=== Kingsley ===
2005 Western Australian state election: Kingsley
Party	Candidate	Votes	%	±%
Labor	Judy Hughes	9,294	37.4	+3.1
Liberal	Colin Edwardes	9,263	37.3	−4.2
Independent	Marie Evans	2,859	11.5	+11.5
Greens	Katrina Bercov	1,496	6.0	−0.5
Christian Democrats	Marcus Ward	747	3.0	−0.5
Independent	Trevor Gersch	602	2.4	+2.4
Family First	Mark Patterson	590	2.4	+2.4
Total formal votes		24,851	95.2	−0.5
Informal votes		1,265	4.8	+0.5
Turnout		26,116	93.5	
Two-party-preferred result
Labor	Judy Hughes	12,611	50.8	+3.3
Liberal	Colin Edwardes	12,228	49.2	−3.3
Labor gain from Liberal		Swing	+3.3	

=== Leschenault ===
2005 Western Australian state election: Leschenault
Party	Candidate	Votes	%	±%
Liberal	Dan Sullivan	6,022	50.8	−1.3
Labor	Anthony Marinovich	4,247	35.8	+9.1
Greens	Dee Wickham	761	6.4	+0.7
Christian Democrats	Ross Lecras	426	3.6	+3.6
One Nation	Caroline Whitworth	405	3.4	−7.6
Total formal votes		11,861	95.1	−2.1
Informal votes		617	4.9	+2.1
Turnout		12,478	91.5	
Two-party-preferred result
Liberal	Dan Sullivan	6,836	57.7	−4.1
Labor	Anthony Marinovich	5,014	42.3	+4.1
Liberal hold		Swing	−4.1	

=== Mandurah ===
2005 Western Australian state election: Mandurah
Party	Candidate	Votes	%	±%
Labor	David Templeman	7,217	57.6	+14.3
Liberal	Ashley King	4,110	32.8	+1.1
Greens	Rebecca Brown	380	3.0	−1.9
Family First	Trent Peterson	308	2.5	+2.5
One Nation	Sonja Davalos	218	1.7	−11.9
Christian Democrats	Fiona McKenzie-Brown	190	1.5	+1.5
Citizens Electoral Council	Ian Tuffnell	106	0.8	+0.8
Total formal votes		12,529	94.8	−1.3
Informal votes		683	5.2	+1.3
Turnout		13,212	90.4	
Two-party-preferred result
Labor	David Templeman	7,802	62.3	+4.6
Liberal	Ashley King	4,720	37.7	−4.6
Labor hold		Swing	+4.6	

=== Maylands ===
2005 Western Australian state election: Maylands
Party	Candidate	Votes	%	±%
Labor	Judy Edwards	12,668	53.88	+3.27
Liberal	Roslyn Webb	6,464	27.49	–0.42
Greens	James Rayner	2,646	11.25	+2.83
Christian Democrats	Dunstan Hartley	921	3.92	+3.92
Family First	Judy Joyce	812	3.45	+3.45
Total formal votes		23,511	94.02	–0.23
Informal votes		1,496	5.98	+0.23
Turnout		25,007	89.60	+0.20
Two-party-preferred result
Labor	Judy Edwards	15,626	66.52	+2.04
Liberal	Roslyn Webb	7,863	33.48	–2.04
Labor hold		Swing	+2.04	

=== Merredin ===
2005 Western Australian state election: Merredin
Party	Candidate	Votes	%	±%
National	Brendon Grylls	5,974	49.3	−1.6
Liberal	Jamie Falls	3,224	26.6	+20.8
Labor	Stephen Fewster	1,491	12.3	−3.4
New Country	Julie Townrow	575	4.7	+4.7
Greens	Robert Mann	298	2.5	−0.7
One Nation	Peter Arnold	274	2.3	−18.2
Christian Democrats	Noel Beckingham	273	2.3	+2.3
Total formal votes		12,109	96.1	0.0
Informal votes		490	3.9	0.0
Turnout		12,599	91.4	
Notional two-party-preferred count
National	Brendon Grylls	9,927	82.0	+9.5
Labor	Stephen Fewster	2,173	18.0	−9.5
Two-candidate-preferred result
National	Brendon Grylls	7,890	65.5	−7.0
Liberal	Jamie Falls	4,162	34.5	+34.5
National hold		Swing	−7.0	

=== Midland ===
2005 Western Australian state election: Midland
Party	Candidate	Votes	%	±%
Labor	Michelle Roberts	10,614	47.2	+3.2
Liberal	Charlie Zannino	7,884	35.1	+7.8
Greens	Tim Hall	2,428	10.8	+1.2
Christian Democrats	Karen Chew	837	3.7	+3.7
One Nation	Albert Caine	718	3.2	−7.1
Total formal votes		22,481	94.7	+0.2
Informal votes		1,263	5.3	−0.2
Turnout		23,744	90.4	
Two-party-preferred result
Labor	Michelle Roberts	13,126	58.5	−2.5
Liberal	Charlie Zannino	9,324	41.5	+2.5
Labor hold		Swing	−2.5	

=== Mindarie ===
2005 Western Australian state election: Mindarie
Party	Candidate	Votes	%	±%
Labor	John Quigley	10,122	47.6	+8.6
Liberal	Mike Lowry	8,516	40.0	+1.4
Greens	Miguel Castillo	1,404	6.6	−0.6
Family First	Doug Croker	779	3.7	+3.7
Christian Democrats	Pat Shea	466	2.2	+0.7
Total formal votes		21,287	95.1	−0.8
Informal votes		1,103	4.9	+0.8
Turnout		22,390	91.0	
Two-party-preferred result
Labor	John Quigley	11,491	54.0	+2.8
Liberal	Mike Lowry	9,788	46.0	−2.8
Labor hold		Swing	+2.8	

=== Moore ===
2005 Western Australian state election: Moore
Party	Candidate	Votes	%	±%
Liberal	Gary Snook	5,142	44.7	+13.0
Labor	Larraine Craven	2,441	21.2	+0.6
National	Peter Stubbs	1,999	17.4	+0.2
Greens	Sally Craddock	709	6.2	−0.1
One Nation	Kevan Brown	436	3.8	−19.4
New Country	Judy Roberts	312	2.7	+2.7
Independent	Bob Rogers	242	2.1	+2.1
Christian Democrats	David Hood	183	1.6	+1.6
Citizens Electoral Council	Judy Sudholz	38	0.3	+0.3
Total formal votes		11,502	94.6	−1.9
Informal votes		653	5.4	+1.9
Turnout		12,155	91.6	
Two-party-preferred result
Liberal	Gary Snook	7,734	67.3	+5.7
Labor	Larraine Craven	3,755	32.7	−5.7
Liberal hold		Swing	+5.7	

=== Murchison-Eyre ===
2005 Western Australian state election: Murchison-Eyre
Party	Candidate	Votes	%	±%
Labor	John Bowler	5,186	51.8	+10.1
Liberal	Colin Brand	3,706	37.0	+11.0
Greens	Scott Ludlam	498	5.0	+3.9
One Nation	Derek Major	355	3.5	−12.5
Christian Democrats	Don Byrne	265	2.6	+2.6
Total formal votes		10,010	95.4	−0.4
Informal votes		485	4.6	+0.4
Turnout		10,495	73.1	
Two-party-preferred result
Labor	John Bowler	5,811	58.1	+0.4
Liberal	Colin Brand	4,194	41.9	−0.4
Labor hold		Swing	+0.4	

=== Murdoch ===
2005 Western Australian state election: Murdoch
Party	Candidate	Votes	%	±%
Liberal	Trevor Sprigg	12,024	48.4	+1.6
Labor	Jackie Ormsby	8,823	35.5	+0.3
Greens	Jan Currie	1,821	7.3	−3.2
Christian Democrats	Michael Dunjey	833	3.4	+3.4
Family First	Shayne Weller	655	2.6	+2.6
Independent	Damian Bramanis	452	1.8	+1.8
One Nation	Ursula Stone	240	1.0	−0.2
Total formal votes		24,848	95.4	−0.8
Informal votes		1,209	4.6	+0.8
Turnout		26,057	91.8	
Two-party-preferred result
Liberal	Trevor Sprigg	13,892	55.9	+1.8
Labor	Jackie Ormsby	10,945	44.1	−1.8
Liberal hold		Swing	+1.8	

=== Murray ===
2005 Western Australian state election: Murray
Party	Candidate	Votes	%	±%
Labor	Nuala Keating	5,242	42.0	+7.8
Liberal	Murray Cowper	4,991	40.0	+3.9
National	Julie Giumelli	517	4.1	+4.1
Independent	Morris Bessant	454	3.6	+3.6
Greens	Rochelle Brady	445	3.6	+1.2
Family First	Ron Armstrong	314	2.5	+2.5
One Nation	Angelo Dacheff	244	2.0	−17.5
Christian Democrats	Saskia Matthews	137	1.1	+1.1
Independent	Wayne Donnelly	79	0.6	+0.6
Citizens Electoral Council	Brian McCarthy	52	0.4	+0.4
Total formal votes		12,475	94.3	−2.3
Informal votes		753	5.7	+2.3
Turnout		13,228	89.8	
Two-party-preferred result
Liberal	Murray Cowper	6,331	50.8	+1.5
Labor	Nuala Keating	6,133	49.2	−1.5
Liberal gain from Labor		Swing	+1.5	

=== Nedlands ===
2005 Western Australian state election: Nedlands
Party	Candidate	Votes	%	±%
Liberal	Sue Walker	12,912	51.9	+6.1
Labor	Chris Hondros	6,876	27.6	+7.2
Greens	Tom Wilson	3,944	15.8	+8.8
Christian Democrats	Gail Forder	707	2.8	+2.5
Family First	Brian Langenberg	446	1.8	+1.8
Total formal votes		24,885	96.5	−0.9
Informal votes		915	3.5	+0.9
Turnout		25,800	90.3	
Two-party-preferred result
Liberal	Sue Walker	14,533	58.4	−0.7
Labor	Chris Hondros	10,388	41.6	+0.7
Liberal hold		Swing	−0.7	

=== North West Coastal ===
2005 Western Australian state election: North West Coastal
Party	Candidate	Votes	%	±%
Labor	Fred Riebeling	4,870	43.9	+0.5
Liberal	David Hay	4,004	36.1	+2.3
Independent	Lex Fullarton	1,230	11.1	+8.2
Greens	Peter Shaw	546	4.9	−1.0
Christian Democrats	Paul Pleysier	251	2.3	+2.3
One Nation	Bob Hodgkinson	182	1.6	−12.0
Total formal votes		11,083	95.3	−0.9
Informal votes		552	4.7	+0.9
Turnout		11,635	80.1	
Two-party-preferred result
Labor	Fred Riebeling	5,950	53.7	−1.7
Liberal	David Hay	5,120	46.3	+1.7
Labor hold		Swing	−1.7	

=== Peel ===
2005 Western Australian state election: Peel
Party	Candidate	Votes	%	±%
Labor	Norm Marlborough	12,558	55.0	+5.0
Liberal	Rob Brown	6,628	29.0	+3.9
Greens	Julie Baker	1,456	6.4	−1.0
Christian Democrats	Brent Tremain	859	3.8	+3.8
Family First	Graham Winterbottom	751	3.3	+3.3
One Nation	William Ritchie	501	2.2	−9.9
Citizens Electoral Council	Mick Le-Cocq	90	0.4	+0.4
Total formal votes		22,843	94.8	−1.4
Informal votes		1,249	5.2	+1.4
Turnout		24,092	90.1	
Two-party-preferred result
Labor	Norm Marlborough	14,488	63.5	+0.2
Liberal	Rob Brown	8,328	36.5	−0.2
Labor hold		Swing	+0.2	

=== Perth ===
2005 Western Australian state election: Perth
Party	Candidate	Votes	%	±%
Labor	John Hyde	11,303	49.1	+3.6
Liberal	David Lagan	7,596	33.0	+0.3
Greens	Damian Douglas-Meyer	2,982	12.9	+2.1
Christian Democrats	Gus Loh	594	2.6	+2.6
Independent	Don Hyland	375	1.6	+1.6
One Nation	Marie Edmonds	186	0.8	−2.9
Total formal votes		23,036	94.9	+0.5
Informal votes		1,240	5.1	−0.5
Turnout		24,276	87.8	
Two-party-preferred result
Labor	John Hyde	14,287	62.0	+1.5
Liberal	David Lagan	8,741	38.0	−1.5
Labor hold		Swing	+1.5	

=== Riverton ===
2005 Western Australian state election: Riverton
Party	Candidate	Votes	%	±%
Labor	Tony McRae	10,825	43.9	+5.2
Liberal	Margaret Thomas	9,980	40.4	+2.9
Greens	Brad Pettitt	1,450	5.9	−2.0
Christian Democrats	Rajesh Vettoor	710	2.9	+2.5
Family First	Deborah Hudson	600	2.4	+2.4
Independent	Trish Fowler	595	2.4	+2.4
One Nation	Aida Konstek	263	1.1	−4.8
Independent	Choy Chan Ma	259	1.0	+1.0
Total formal votes		24,682	94.7	−1.7
Informal votes		1,370	5.3	+1.7
Turnout		26,052	92.3	
Two-party-preferred result
Labor	Tony McRae	12,757	51.7	−1.4
Liberal	Margaret Thomas	11,910	48.3	+1.4
Labor hold		Swing	−1.4	

=== Rockingham ===
2005 Western Australian state election: Rockingham
Party	Candidate	Votes	%	±%
Labor	Mark McGowan	12,573	56.3	+2.3
Liberal	Paul Ellis	7,108	31.8	+7.3
Greens	Daniel Boulton	1,040	4.7	−1.1
Christian Democrats	June Lewis	567	2.5	+2.5
One Nation	Garth Stockden	544	2.4	−9.7
Family First	Carena Harvey	416	1.9	+1.9
Citizens Electoral Council	Rob Totten	99	0.4	+0.4
Total formal votes		22,347	94.5	−0.7
Informal votes		1,311	5.5	+0.7
Turnout		23,658	90.7	
Two-party-preferred result
Labor	Mark McGowan	13,925	62.3	−3.7
Liberal	Paul Ellis	8,413	37.7	+3.7
Labor hold		Swing	−3.7	

=== Roe ===
2005 Western Australian state election: Roe
Party	Candidate	Votes	%	±%
Liberal	Graham Jacobs	5,629	48.2	+27.0
National	Jane McMeikan	3,746	32.1	−5.1
Labor	Ron Sao	1,219	10.4	−5.8
Greens	Louise Lodge	355	3.0	+3.0
One Nation	Charles Johnston	299	2.6	−18.9
Christian Democrats	Steve Leeder	234	2.0	+2.0
Independent	Bill Crabtree	188	1.6	+1.6
Total formal votes		11,670	96.4	−0.5
Informal votes		439	3.6	+0.5
Turnout		12,109	90.3	
Notional two-party-preferred count
Liberal	Graham Jacobs	9,540	81.8	+10.1
Labor	Ron Sao	2,119	18.2	−10.1
Two-candidate-preferred result
Liberal	Graham Jacobs	6,475	55.6	+55.6
National	Jane McMeikan	5,181	44.4	−27.3
Liberal gain from National		Swing	N/A	

=== Serpentine-Jarrahdale ===
2005 Western Australian state election: Serpentine-Jarrahdale
Party	Candidate	Votes	%	±%
Liberal	Tony Simpson	10,762	43.9	+1.6
Labor	Daron Smith	9,992	40.7	+7.6
Greens	Win Dockter	1,326	5.4	−1.7
Christian Democrats	Michelle Verkerk	724	3.0	−0.1
Family First	Robert Pipes	702	2.9	+2.9
Independent	Fiona Cropper	540	2.2	+2.2
One Nation	Paul Nield	487	2.0	−7.5
Total formal votes		24,533	95.3	−0.8
Informal votes		1,199	4.7	+0.8
Turnout		25,732	92.2	
Two-party-preferred result
Liberal	Tony Simpson	12,530	51.2	−3.0
Labor	Daron Smith	11,961	48.8	+3.0
Liberal hold		Swing	−3.0	

=== South Perth ===
2005 Western Australian state election: South Perth
Party	Candidate	Votes	%	±%
Liberal	John McGrath	10,689	44.2	+14.3
Labor	Dale Kelliher	8,184	33.9	+6.6
Independent	Jim Grayden	2,542	10.5	+10.5
Greens	Alan Hopkins	2,071	8.6	+2.1
Christian Democrats	Michael Davis	673	2.8	+2.8
Total formal votes		24,159	96.4	−0.4
Informal votes		905	3.6	+0.4
Turnout		25,064	89.2	
Two-party-preferred result
Liberal	John McGrath	13,478	55.8	−2.3
Labor	Dale Kelliher	10,674	44.2	+44.2
Liberal gain from Independent		Swing	N/A	

=== Southern River ===
2005 Western Australian state election: Southern River
Party	Candidate	Votes	%	±%
Labor	Paul Andrews	12,190	52.5	+4.8
Liberal	Monica Holmes	6,845	29.5	+1.8
Greens	Mike Beilby	1,346	5.8	+0.8
Family First	Lisa Saladine	912	3.9	+3.9
Christian Democrats	Terry Ryan	911	3.9	−0.2
One Nation	Brian Deane	562	2.4	−7.6
Independent	Tim Dowsett	442	1.9	+1.9
Total formal votes		23,208	94.5	0.0
Informal votes		1,352	5.5	0.0
Turnout		24,560	91.5	
Two-party-preferred result
Labor	Paul Andrews	14,336	61.8	+1.4
Liberal	Monica Holmes	8,858	38.2	−1.4
Labor hold		Swing	+1.4	

=== Stirling ===
2005 Western Australian state election: Stirling
Party	Candidate	Votes	%	±%
Liberal	Ron Scott	3,333	26.4	+26.4
National	Terry Redman	2,735	21.7	−15.4
Labor	Jan Benson-Lidholm	2,500	19.8	+1.3
Independent	Vicki Brown	1,901	15.1	+15.1
Greens	Diane Evers	1,090	8.6	−4.3
Christian Democrats	Norm Baker	429	3.4	+3.4
Family First	Terry Dixon	384	3.0	+3.0
One Nation	Darius Crowe	255	2.0	−15.8
Total formal votes		12,627	95.6	−1.2
Informal votes		588	4.4	+1.2
Turnout		13,215	92.0	
Notional two-party-preferred count
National	Terry Redman	7,851	62.7	+0.8
Labor	Jan Benson-Lidholm	4,665	37.3	−0.8
Two-candidate-preferred result
National	Terry Redman	7,191	57.0	−5.0
Liberal	Ron Scott	5,417	43.0	+43.0
National hold		Swing	−5.0	

=== Swan Hills ===
2005 Western Australian state election: Swan Hills
Party	Candidate	Votes	%	±%
Labor	Jaye Radisich	10,703	45.0	+14.4
Liberal	Steve Blizard	9,205	38.7	+2.1
Greens	Sharon Davies	1,789	7.5	−4.4
Christian Democrats	Eric Miller	568	2.4	+2.4
Family First	Ian Saladine	362	1.5	+1.5
One Nation	David Gunnyon	348	1.5	−9.7
Independent	Mike Stoddart	346	1.5	+1.5
Independent	Alison Hornsey	294	1.2	+1.2
Independent	Ross Gundry	144	0.6	+0.6
Total formal votes		23,759	95.4	−0.6
Informal votes		1,135	4.6	+0.6
Turnout		24,894	92.3	
Two-party-preferred result
Labor	Jaye Radisich	12,782	53.8	+3.5
Liberal	Steve Blizard	10,958	46.2	−3.5
Labor hold		Swing	+3.5	

=== Vasse ===
2005 Western Australian state election: Vasse
Party	Candidate	Votes	%	±%
Liberal	Troy Buswell	4,611	37.6	+9.4
Labor	Ross Bromell	2,649	21.6	−3.6
Independent	Bernie Masters	2,526	20.6	+20.6
National	Beryle Morgan	1,207	9.8	−14.6
Greens	Jim Matan	681	5.6	−2.4
Family First	Paul Clayson	222	1.8	+1.8
Christian Democrats	Tracey Brough	162	1.3	+1.3
One Nation	Charles Doyle	147	1.2	−10.1
New Country	Ron Asher	61	0.5	+0.5
Total formal votes		12,266	95.4	−1.2
Informal votes		591	4.6	+1.2
Turnout		12,857	91.8	
Notional two-party-preferred count
Liberal	Troy Buswell	7,388	60.3	+6.2
Labor	Ross Bromell	4,871	39.7	−6.2
Two-candidate-preferred result
Liberal	Troy Buswell	6,228	50.9	−3.2
Independent	Bernie Masters	6,019	49.1	+49.1
Liberal hold		Swing	−3.2	

=== Victoria Park ===
2005 Western Australian state election: Victoria Park
Party	Candidate	Votes	%	±%
Labor	Geoff Gallop	12,432	57.3	+5.3
Liberal	Neil Fearis	6,019	27.7	+1.5
Greens	Dave Fort	1,880	8.7	+0.8
Christian Democrats	Brett Crook	785	3.6	+3.1
One Nation	Sue Bateman	576	2.7	−4.6
Total formal votes		21,692	94.7	−0.2
Informal votes		1,219	5.3	+0.2
Turnout		22,911	87.7	
Two-party-preferred result
Labor	Geoff Gallop	14,314	66.0	+1.9
Liberal	Neil Fearis	7,362	34.0	−1.9
Labor hold		Swing	+1.9	

=== Wagin ===
2005 Western Australian state election: Wagin
Party	Candidate	Votes	%	±%
National	Terry Waldron	8,137	69.0	+41.8
Labor	David Michael	1,915	16.2	+0.6
Greens	Paul Davis	541	4.6	+0.3
Christian Democrats	Peter Faulkner	473	4.0	+4.0
One Nation	Agnes Goedhart	463	3.9	−15.0
Citizens Electoral Council	Arthur Harvey	258	2.2	+2.2
Total formal votes		11,787	95.2	−0.7
Informal votes		593	4.8	+0.7
Turnout		12,380	91.5	
Two-party-preferred result
National	Terry Waldron	9,222	78.4	+9.4
Labor	David Michael	2,546	21.6	−9.4
National hold		Swing	+9.4	

=== Wanneroo ===
2005 Western Australian state election: Wanneroo
Party	Candidate	Votes	%	±%
Labor	Dianne Guise	13,537	49.9	+10.7
Liberal	Paul Miles	9,663	35.6	−1.0
Greens	Marija Pericic	1,281	4.7	−1.1
Family First	Robert Green	1,026	3.8	+3.8
Christian Democrats	Seb Gerbaz	626	2.3	+2.3
Independent	Anne Cowley	514	1.9	+1.9
One Nation	Marye Daniels	478	1.8	−9.2
Total formal votes		27,125	94.5	−0.3
Informal votes		1,566	5.5	+0.3
Turnout		28,691	91.3	
Two-party-preferred result
Labor	Dianne Guise	15,377	56.7	+3.6
Liberal	Paul Miles	11,733	43.3	−3.6
Labor hold		Swing	+3.6	

=== Warren-Blackwood ===
2005 Western Australian state election: Warren-Blackwood
Party	Candidate	Votes	%	±%
Liberal	Paul Omodei	7,668	56.8	+9.0
Labor	Peter McKenzie	2,993	22.2	+5.7
Greens	Nick Dornan	1,760	13.0	−0.2
Family First	Garry Cain	385	2.8	+2.8
One Nation	Jodie Yardley	379	2.8	−8.6
New Country	Bob Marshall	207	1.5	+1.5
Christian Democrats	Matt Palmer	119	0.9	+0.9
Total formal votes		13,511	95.0	−1.9
Informal votes		704	5.0	+1.9
Turnout		14,215	91.2	
Two-party-preferred result
Liberal	Paul Omodei	8,774	65.0	+0.3
Labor	Peter McKenzie	4,722	35.0	−0.3
Liberal hold		Swing	+0.3	

=== Willagee ===
2005 Western Australian state election: Willagee
Party	Candidate	Votes	%	±%
Labor	Alan Carpenter	10,897	51.7	−5.0
Liberal	Bob Smith	5,080	24.1	+2.5
Greens	Hsien Harper	1,839	8.7	−2.2
Independent	Trish Phelan	1,003	4.8	+4.8
Independent	Andrew Sullivan	657	3.1	+3.1
Christian Democrats	Rosemary Lorrimar	645	3.1	+3.1
Family First	Paul Byrnes	628	3.0	+3.0
One Nation	Bill Cook	310	1.5	−5.9
Total formal votes		21,059	91.8	−3.1
Informal votes		1,885	8.2	+3.1
Turnout		22,944	89.9	
Two-party-preferred result
Labor	Alan Carpenter	13,968	66.4	−4.7
Liberal	Bob Smith	7,073	33.6	+4.7
Labor hold		Swing	−4.7	

=== Yokine ===
2005 Western Australian state election: Yokine
Party	Candidate	Votes	%	±%
Labor	Bob Kucera	11,645	49.0	+0.9
Liberal	Dave Vos	8,523	35.8	+1.8
Greens	Heather Aquilina	1,559	6.6	+0.4
Family First	Emily Hopkinson	724	3.0	+3.0
Christian Democrats	Warick Smith	644	2.7	+2.7
Independent	Jean Thornton	471	2.0	+2.0
One Nation	Frank Feher	223	0.9	−0.9
Total formal votes		23,789	93.4	−0.8
Informal votes		1,672	6.6	+0.8
Turnout		25,461	90.5	
Two-party-preferred result
Labor	Bob Kucera	13,846	58.2	−0.6
Liberal	Dave Vos	9,926	41.8	+0.6
Labor hold		Swing	−0.6	

== See also ==
- Results of the Western Australian state election, 2005 (Legislative Council)
- 2005 Western Australian state election
- Candidates of the Western Australian state election, 2005
- Members of the Western Australian Legislative Assembly, 2005–2008
