= Members of the Western Australian Legislative Council, 2001–2005 =

This is a list of members of the Western Australian Legislative Council between 22 May 2001 and 21 May 2005:

Name	Party	Province	Years in office
Alan Cadby	Liberal/Independent^{[1]}	North Metropolitan	2001–2005
George Cash	Liberal	North Metropolitan	1989–2009
Kim Chance	Labor	Agricultural	1992–2009
Robin Chapple	Greens	Mining and Pastoral	2001–2005; 2009–2021
John Cowdell	Labor	South West	1993–2005
Murray Criddle	National	Agricultural	1993–2008
Ed Dermer	Labor	North Metropolitan	1996–2013
Bruce Donaldson	Liberal	Agricultural	1993–2009
Kate Doust	Labor	South Metropolitan	2001–present
Sue Ellery	Labor	South Metropolitan	2001–present
Paddy Embry	One Nation / Ind. / New Country^{[2]}	South West	2001–2005
Adele Farina	Labor	South West	2001–2021
John Fischer	One Nation / Ind.^{[3]}	Mining and Pastoral	2001–2005
Jon Ford	Labor	Mining and Pastoral	2001–2013
Peter Foss	Liberal	East Metropolitan	1989–2005
Graham Giffard	Labor	North Metropolitan	2000–2008
Nick Griffiths	Labor	East Metropolitan	1993–2009
Ray Halligan	Liberal	North Metropolitan	1997–2009
Frank Hough	One Nation / Ind. / New Country^{[3]}	Agricultural	2001–2005
Barry House	Liberal	South West	1987–2017
Kevin Leahy^{[4]}	Labor	Mining and Pastoral	2004–2005
Lynn MacLaren^{[5]}	Greens	South Metropolitan	2005; 2009–2017
Dee Margetts	Greens	Agricultural	2001–2005
Robyn McSweeney	Liberal	South West	2001–2017
Norman Moore	Liberal	Mining and Pastoral	1977–2013
Simon O'Brien	Liberal	South Metropolitan	1997–2021
Louise Pratt	Labor	East Metropolitan	2001–2007
Ljiljanna Ravlich	Labor	East Metropolitan	1997–2015
Barbara Scott	Liberal	South Metropolitan	1993–2009
Jim Scott^{[5]}	Greens	South Metropolitan	1993–2005
Chrissy Sharp	Greens	South West	1997–2005
Tom Stephens^{[4]}	Labor	Mining and Pastoral	1982–2004
Bill Stretch	Liberal	South West	1983–2005
Derrick Tomlinson	Liberal	East Metropolitan	1989–2005
Ken Travers	Labor	North Metropolitan	1997–2016
Giz Watson	Greens	North Metropolitan	1997–2013

== Notes ==
^{1} North Metropolitan Liberal MLC Alan Cadby resigned to sit as an independent on 2 June 2004, after losing Liberal pre-selection to recontest his seat at the 2005 election.
^{2} South West MLC Paddy Embry was elected as a One Nation member, but resigned from the party on 15 May 2003 and sat as an independent. He later co-founded the New Country Party, and represented them in the Council towards the end of his term.
^{3} The two remaining One Nation members, John Fischer and Frank Hough, resigned from the party on 1 June 2004 and began serving as independents. Hough later co-founded the New Country Party with Paddy Embry, while Fischer chose to serve out his term as an independent.
^{4} Mining and Pastoral Labor MLC Tom Stephens resigned his seat on 28 September 2004 to contest the federal Kalgoorlie at the 2004 election, after the existing candidate died suddenly. Kevin Leahy served as a temporary replacement for the remainder of Stephens' term. Though Stephens failed to win the Kalgoorlie contest, he was instead elected to the Legislative Assembly as the member for Central Kimberley-Pilbara on 26 February 2005.
^{5} South Metropolitan Greens MLC Jim Scott resigned on 20 January 2005 to contest the Legislative Assembly seat of Fremantle at the February 2005 election. He was replaced by Lynn MacLaren for the last weeks of his term, and MacLaren contested the South Metropolitan seat in what had been Scott's place.
