= Kevin Reynolds (unionist) =

Australian trade unionist

Kevin Reynolds was the Western Australian state secretary for the Construction, Forestry, Mining and Energy Union (CFMEU). Prior to this he was involved with the Builders Labourers Federation in the 1970s and 1980s where he formed an association with Norm Gallagher.

Reynolds held considerable influence in the centre-right faction of the Western Australian branch of the Australian Labor Party and is closely associated with former premier, Brian Burke.

== Personal life ==
Reynolds' partner is former Western Australian MLC, Shelley Archer.

== See also ==
- Solidarity Park
