= Basil Embry =

Royal Air Force Air Chief Marshal (1902–1977)

Air Chief Marshal Sir Basil Edward Embry GCB, KBE, DSO & Three Bars, DFC, AFC
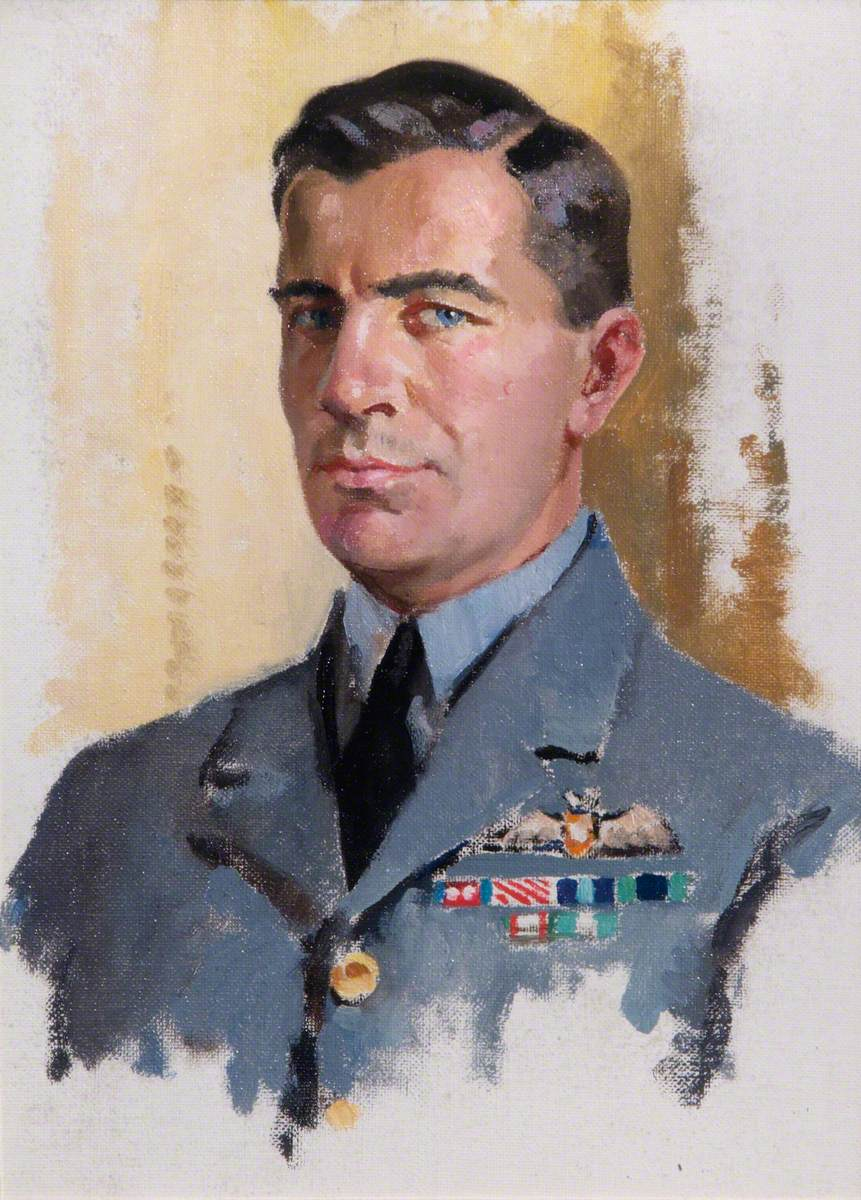
- Portrait of Embry in the 1940s, by Francis Edwin Hodge
- Born: 28 February 1902; Gloucestershire, England
- Died: 7 December 1977 (aged 75); Boyup Brook, Western Australia
- Spouse: Margaret Elliot
- Children: 5, including Paddy
- Military career
- Allegiance: United Kingdom
- Branch: Royal Air Force
- Service years: 1921–1956
- Rank: Air Chief Marshal
- Commands: Allied Air Forces Central Europe (1953–56); Fighter Command (1949–53); No. 2 Group (1943–45); RAF Wittering (1940–41, 1942); No. 107 Squadron (1939–40); No. 20 Squadron (1937–38)
- Conflicts: North-West Frontier: Second Mohmand Campaign; Second World War: Norwegian Campaign; Battle of France
- Awards: Knight Grand Cross of the Order of the Bath; Knight Commander of the Order of the British Empire; Companion of the Distinguished Service Order & Three Bars; Distinguished Flying Cross; Air Force Cross; Mentioned in Despatches (4); Commander of the Legion of Honour (France); Croix de guerre (France); Commander 1st Class of the Order of the Dannebrog (Denmark); Grand Officer with Swords of the Order of Orange Nassau (Netherlands)
- Other work: Sheep farmer

Air Chief Marshal Sir Basil Edward Embry, GCB, KBE, DSO & Three Bars, DFC, AFC (28 February 1902 – 7 December 1977) was a senior Royal Air Force commander. He was Commander-in-Chief of Fighter Command from 1949 to 1953.

== Early life and career ==
Basil Embry was born in Gloucestershire, England, in 1902 and as a young boy at Bromsgrove School he developed an avid interest in aviation. In 1921 he joined the Royal Air Force with a short service commission as an acting pilot officer. In 1922 he was sent to Mandatory Iraq, serving under future Air Marshals Arthur Harris and Robert Saundby. By 1926 Embry's enthusiasm, professional application, boundless energy and flair for the unconventional had put him on the fast track for promotion within the RAF, and he was rewarded with the Air Force Cross in that year's New Year Honours, and appointment to a permanent commission.

Promoted to flight lieutenant, Embry returned to Britain in 1927 and soon became an instructor at the Central Flying School, Uxbridge.

In 1934 Embry was posted to India to serve in the Indian Wing on the North West Frontier. He was promoted squadron leader in 1935, and served in the Second Mohmand Campaign of 1935. He was appointed a Companion of the Distinguished Service Order (DSO) for operations in Waziristan in 1938. He was further promoted in 1938 to wing commander. After five years' service he returned to Britain in 1939.

== Second World War ==
On the outbreak of the Second World War Embry was Commanding Officer of No. 107 Squadron flying the Bristol Blenheim bomber. The energetic Embry led his squadron from the front, and he saw extensive action during the campaigns in Norway and France, often in the face of heavy losses and overwhelming opposition. On 25 September 1939 Embry led a 3-plane formation on a reconnaissance sortie into Germany. Intercepted by German fighters, Embry's aircraft suffered serious damage to wings and fuselage and he carried out a one-wheel forced landing on returning to RAF Wattisham in Suffolk. Throughout the remainder of 1939 and into early 1940 the unit made numerous attacks by day and night on a variety of targets, including U-boats.

On 6 April 1940 RAF photo-reconnaissance revealed that a German naval force, including the battleships Gneisenau and Scharnhorst, was at anchor off Wilhelmshaven. Embry and his 107 Squadron crews were soon involved in a series of attacks on these ships.

With the German invasion of Norway, 107 Squadron were detached to Scotland, and there carried out ten raids in just eight days on Stavanger and airfields in the area, often in treacherous weather conditions. Embry suffered from frostbite during this time. In April 1940 Embry was awarded a bar to his DSO.

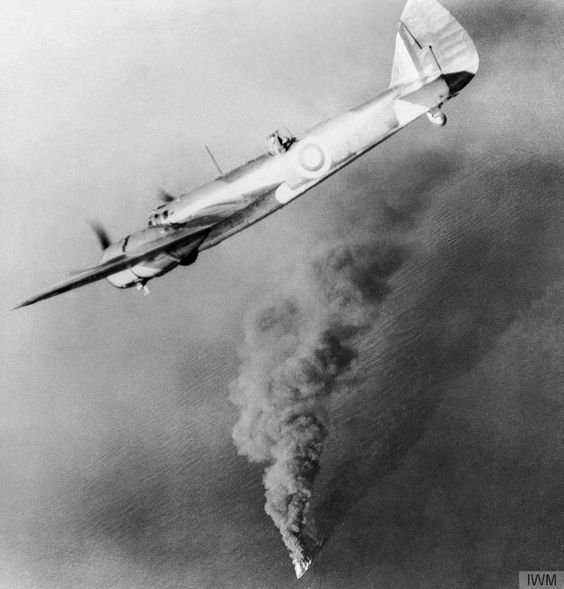
Embry, at the controls of a Bristol Blenheim, circles over a British tanker on fire and sinking in the English Channel, February 1940

=== Battle of France ===
The German invasion of France and the Low Countries began on 10 May 1940 and Embry's Squadron flew intensively against the German advance, each crew flying two or three sorties daily across the English Channel to France. His leadership and personal gallantry resulted in the award of a second bar to his DSO. On 12 May he led No. 107 Squadron and No. 110 Squadron RAF in an attack on two heavily defended bridges across the Albert Canal at Maastricht; the formation was savaged by ground fire and intercepted by numerous Messerschmitt fighters, losing seven Bristol Blenheims from the original force of 24. Two No. 107 Squadron aircraft crash-landed at Wattisham, and every surviving Blenheim had suffered some damage.

Due to the tremendous pressure of his operational flying in recent months Embry was then ordered to take an operational 'rest' and was given command of RAF West Raynham, with a promotion to group captain. He was to fly one more sortie before relinquishing command. On 27 May 1940, Embry was shot down from 6,000 ft (1,800 m) by anti-aircraft fire over Saint-Omer during a low-level bombing mission against advancing German Army columns. His aircraft crashed at Eperlecques. Of his crew, observer Pilot Officer T. A. Whiting was made prisoner while Air Gunner Corporal G. E. Long was killed.

Captured by the German Army, Embry was being marched away in a column of Allied prisoners when he saw a road sign "Embry, 3 km." Taking this as a good omen, he rolled down a bank unnoticed by the column's guards and made his escape. He successfully evaded recapture for two months in occupied France before eventually getting back to England via Spain and Gibraltar. His adventures while on the run are detailed in the book Wingless Victory by Anthony Richardson and originally published in 1950.

After two months' sick leave, Embry was posted to No. 6 Group as Senior Air Staff Officer with the rank of group captain. After only three weeks he was offered command of a night-fighter wing in RAF Fighter Command, which was accepted, although he reverted to the rank of wing commander. The wing disbanded in December 1940 and Embry became AOC RAF Wittering, returning to the rank of group captain in March 1941. Embry kept his hand in operationally by flying radar-equipped night-fighters with No. 25 Squadron. In July 1941 Embry was given the ceremonial title of an Air Aide-de-Camp to the King, and was Mentioned in Despatches in September.

In October 1941 he was seconded to the Desert Air Force as an adviser and saw action in the North Africa campaign.

Embry returned to Britain in March 1942 and served as AOC Wittering again and as AOC No. 10 Group, Fighter Command. In June he was again Mentioned in Despatches, but he was passed over as the prime candidate for leading RAF Bomber Command's newly formed Pathfinder Force in July 1942, before being given command of No. 2 Group Bomber Command, which was about to join the Second Tactical Air Force (2TAF), in June 1943.

=== Command of No. 2 Group ===
Although he was now an air vice marshal, Embry continued to fly on operations where possible, usually as a 'wingman' in a formation and flying under the name of "Wing Commander Smith". By piloting each type of aircraft in his service, he felt better able to ascertain the strengths and weaknesses of the tools available to his aircrews. This ensured that the men under Embry's command were aware that he was willing to take the same risks they were taking, and he was well liked by them. However, within the Air Ministry's hierarchy his frank, unguarded criticisms made few friends.

He pushed fervently for 2 Group's re-equipment with the high-speed De Havilland Mosquito FB VI, which became the highly potent workhorse of the group by 1944. By October 1943, Embry's efforts had made 2 Group highly effective, with its precision daylight bombing and serviceability rates among the best in the Allied Air Forces. The group bombed V-1 flying bomb launch sites in France and transport targets before the Allied landings in Normandy June 1944. In December 1944, he was appointed a Companion of the Order of the Bath.

Embry's Mosquitoes undertook further bombing operations such as the attack on Amiens jail in February 1944. On 31 October 1944, Embry took part in a successful low-level attack by Mosquitoes of Nos. 21, 464 and 487 Squadrons in the Aarhus Air Raid targeting the Aarhus University, Denmark, which housed the Gestapo HQ for the whole of Jutland. In March 1945, Embry's command carried out Operation Carthage on the Gestapo headquarters in Copenhagen, and in April those in Odense.

The three operations led to Embry being awarded the Distinguished Flying Cross for "[pressing] home his attacks with a skill and gallantry in keeping with his outstanding reputation." He was also honoured after the war by the Danish Government for his part in these operations, being awarded the Commander 1st Class of the Order of Dannebrog. On 20 July 1945 he was awarded a third Bar to his DSO. Other nations to honour Embry included the Netherlands (Grand Officer with Swords of the Order of Orange Nassau) and France (Croix de guerre, Commander of the Legion of Honour).

== Post-war career and later life ==
Shortly after the end of the war Embry was knighted with his appointment as a Knight Commander of the Order of the British Empire. He was later to receive further knighthoods with higher precedence: in 1952 he was promoted to Knight Commander of the Order of the Bath, and in 1956 Knight Grand Cross of the Order of the Bath.

He was Commander-in-Chief Fighter Command from 1949 to 1953. Embry was appointed Commander-in-Chief of Allied Air Forces Central Europe. His outspoken criticism of the NATO chain of command and organisation framework ensured however that he was retired early from the Royal Air Force in 1956.

In 1956 Embry briefly relocated to New Zealand where he wrote his autobiography, titled Mission Completed.

In March 1956, accompanied by his wife Hope, he emigrated to Western Australia and began a new life as a sheep farmer, purchasing a 1,400-acre (5.7 km^{2}) property at Chowerup. He also acquired land at Cape Riche, east of Albany, and moved there in the late 1960s.

Embry became active in the politics of agriculture through the Farmers' Union of Western Australia. He was elected General President in 1971 and held office for two years. In 1972 he led a delegation through South-east Asia and instigated the establishment of the Rural Traders Co-operative (W.A.) Ltd.

He was the president of the Royal Air Forces Escaping Society and worked himself at a punishing pace until he became ill in 1975. Embry died in Boyup Brook, Western Australia, in 1977, and was survived by his wife, daughter, and three of his four sons.

"He was both charming and rude, prejudiced and broad-minded, pliable and obstinate, dedicated and human." (Group Captain Peter Wykeham, No 2 Group 1944–45)

On 19 April 2007 Spink auctioned the medal group of Air Chief Marshal Sir Basil Embry, selling for £155,350 to Michael Naxton, an agent.

== Personal life ==
Embry married Australian-born Lady Margaret Hope Elliot on 1 August 1928, and went on to have five children with her, including Western Australian politician Paddy Embry.

Military offices
Preceded by Sir William Elliot	Commander-in-Chief Fighter Command; 1949–1953	Succeeded by Sir Dermot Boyle
New title Command established	Commander-in-Chief Allied Air Forces Central Europe; 1953–1956	Succeeded by Sir George Mills
