= Shelley Archer =

Australian politician

Shelley Frances Archer (born 15 October 1958) is a former Australian politician. She was a Labor Party member of the Western Australian Legislative Council from May 2005, representing the Mining and Pastoral electoral region. A former union official, she was one of several state MPs to become involved in the 2006–2007 Corruption and Crime Commission investigation into the dealings of former-Premier-turned-lobbyist Brian Burke. The partner of influential unionist Kevin Reynolds, she was associated with the conservative wing of the party.

Archer resigned from the ALP in November 2007.

== Early life and political career ==
Archer was born into a family of sixteen children. She is the daughter of Ted Archer, a prominent unionist with the Shop, Distributive and Allied Employees Association and Australian Workers' Union. She worked in several government departments throughout the 1980s, and was the cause of some controversy when she was promoted from a junior position with the Office of the Parliamentary Secretary in the Department of Premier and Cabinet to a much more senior position with the state Office of Industrial Relations in 1989. It was during this time, in 1990, that she began a relationship with unionist Kevin Reynolds, whom she later married. She has a daughter, Melanie, two stepsons Rod and Clint. Grandchildren Taylah and Kobe. She was subsequently sacked by the OIR in 1992 after being tried and convicted on 35 counts of welfare fraud, and unsuccessfully appealed the decision to the state Industrial Relations Commission. The conviction was later declared spent in 2002, after the requisite ten-year period had passed.

In 1993, Archer took up a position as an industrial advocate with the State School Teachers Union. She worked with the union for four years before being fired amidst union infighting in 1998. She had been on stress leave for six months prior to her dismissal due to claimed harassment by colleagues. Archer subsequently won an unfair dismissal case against the union, successfully arguing that she had been targeted because of her relationship with Reynolds, but lost a separate action for discrimination. She later worked as a senior industrial organiser with the Australian Nursing Federation, before gaining a position as an electorate officer to Legislative Council member Graham Giffard, a position which she held until her election to parliament in 2005. She made an unsuccessful bid for the national presidency of the ALP in 2003. Archer served as the campaign director for the campaign of Cimlie Bowden for the seat of Canning at the 2004 federal election.

In December 2003, Archer nominated herself for party pre-selection to contest a seat in the Mining and Pastoral electoral region of the Legislative Council at the 2005 state election. She won the top position on the party's ticket for the region due to the party's affirmative action rules, displacing Minister for Local Government Tom Stephens, who was forced to seek a seat in the Legislative Assembly to remain in parliament. This ensured her election to the Legislative Council, and she took office in July 2005.

In August 2005, Archer, along with fellow incoming MLC Vince Catania, called for a public debate on lifting the state's ban on the mining of uranium, the support of which had long been party policy. She became one of the most ardent opponents of the policy, and called for the setting aside of budget funds to research the merits of uranium mining. Facing firm opposition from Premier Geoff Gallop, Archer and Catania later shifted their attention to overturning the federal party's ban on new mines, preparing a motion which they could take to the party's national conference. A similar motion was later adopted by the national conference in 2007, with the support of both former leader Kim Beazley and current leader Kevin Rudd. She later broke ranks with her party again over the issue of poker machines, calling for their introduction in regional areas to provide another source of income for rural pubs. She made an unsuccessful bid for the position of ALP state president in 2005.

== Corruption and Crime Commission investigation ==
In late 2006, the West Australian Corruption and Crime Commission launched a high-profile investigation into the dealings of former Premier Brian Burke, a lifelong family friend of Archer. The investigation continued for a number of months, forcing the resignations of three government ministers. In late February 2007, the commission turned its focus to Archer after the commission heard a taped call between her and Burke which revealed that she had faxed him a confidential letter from the Broome Shire Council to Planning and Infrastructure Minister Alannah MacTiernan. The commission's inquiries culminated in an intense session on 28 February, when, under intense questioning from the commission's lawyers, Archer admitted that she had contacted MacTiernan and Fisheries Minister Jon Ford to obtain often-confidential information for Burke, had allowed Burke to write a letter that she subsequently sent to Ford in her name, and had acted as a regular go-between of Burke and several ministers. She strongly denied any wrongdoing during the hearings, referring to Burke as "my mentor" and describing her "undying friendship" with him.

The revelations before the commission had immediate consequences for Archer. Opposition Leader Paul Omodei immediately called for her resignation, a call which he repeated regularly over the following weeks. Archer initially remained defiant, declaring that anyone trying to expel her from the party would "need a sledgehammer", threatening legal action if such a move occurred, and vowing that she would continue to meet with Burke. Carpenter publicly labelled her behaviour "unacceptable and reprehensible", but refused to expel her in the face of opposition and media pressure. He was accused both in parliament and in the media of being afraid to take action against Archer because of her relationship with Reynolds, by now a powerful factional leader within the party, an accusation which Carpenter strongly denied. A further factor that was noted in the press was the party's lack of control over the Legislative Council; if Archer was expelled, they would have to rely on her vote as an independent, giving her and Reynolds substantially greater power.

Carpenter initially suggested that he had no power to prevent Archer from continuing to meet with Burke, but facing increasing pressure to resign, Archer relented on 5 March, announcing that she would cease all personal and professional contact with him. Calls for her resignation persisted; former Cabinet minister Bob Kucera and prominent unionist Dave Kelly both demanded that she resign, and state Energy Minister Fran Logan announced that he would not give Archer information relating to his portfolios unless confident that she was "absolutely and clearly aware" of her ethical responsibilities as an MP. In response to the continuing pressure, Carpenter imposed a gag on all Labor MPs from speaking out about the commission's ramifications on 7 March. However, Archer faced further problems when, on 10 March, the opposition disclosed her past spent conviction, the details of which had previously remained unknown, and renewed its calls for her resignation on the basis of her refusal to previously disclose it. Four days later, Carpenter publicly refused to deny that he had asked Archer to resign from the ALP and been refused. After days of intense pressure, Archer broke her media silence on 20 March, again denying any wrongdoing and protesting the revelation of her spent conviction; however, this did little to cease the attacks on her.

In late March, the commission attempted to initiate a new investigation into Archer's dealings while a member of the Legislative Council's standing committee on estimates and financial operations. The commission's investigations had, by this time, also ensnared opposition Liberal MLC Anthony Fels, a fellow member of the committee. The attempted investigation was cut short, however, when the Legislative Council, after briefly referring the matter to its privileges committee, refused to hand over crucial documents and banned MPs and staff from testifying before the commission, citing the doctrine of parliamentary privilege. The unprecedented move forced the indefinite suspension of any further investigation into the pair.

Archer has kept a relatively low profile in and out of parliament since the height of the Burke affair. In June 2007, Archer voted in favour of a stem-cell research bill, during a rare conscience vote.

Following the release of a parliamentary report in November 2007, Mrs Archer and her husband Kevin Reynolds both resigned from the ALP.
