= Michelle Maynard =

Western Australian politician

Michelle Maynard MLA

Member of the Western Australian Legislative Assembly for Swan Hills
- Incumbent
- Assumed office 8 March 2025
- Preceded by: Jessica Shaw

Personal details
- Party: Labor
- Website: michellemaynard.com.au

Michelle Maynard is an Australian politician from the Labor Party who is member of the Western Australian Legislative Assembly for the electoral district of Swan Hills. She won her seat at the 2025 Western Australian state election.

Maynard is an accountant by profession. She is the treasurer of the Ellenbrook Dockers, the Ellenbrook Community Collective and Swan Chamber of Commerce.

As of 2025, she was one of four Labor members of the Parliament of Western Australia who are not factionally aligned, having previously been a member of the Left faction.

Western Australian Legislative Assembly
Preceded by Jessica Shaw	Member for Swan Hills; 2025–present	Incumbent
