= Jessica Shaw =

Australian politician

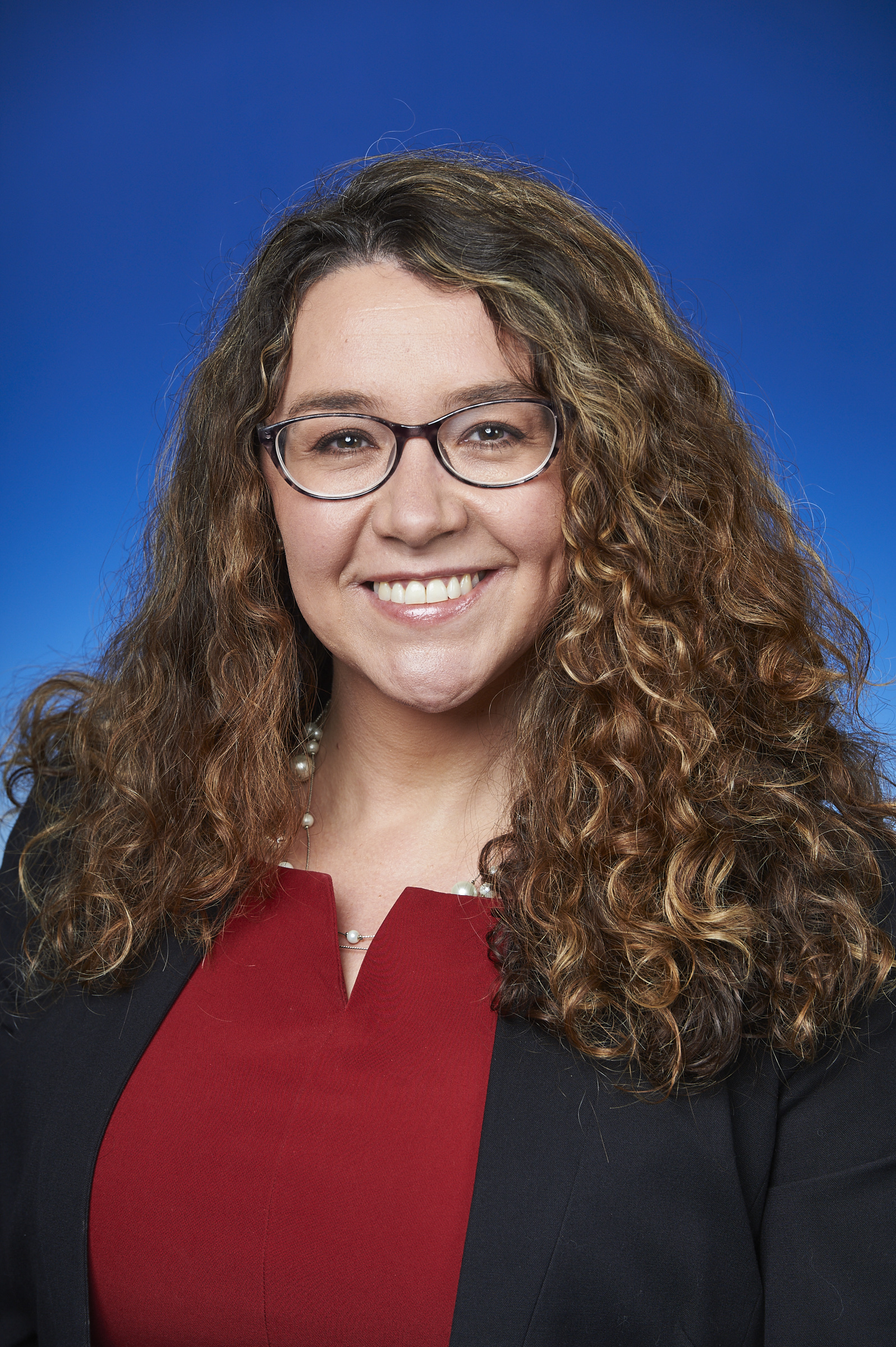

Member of the Western Australian Legislative Assembly for Swan Hills
- In office 11 March 2017 – 5 February 2025
- Preceded by: Frank Alban
- Succeeded by: Michelle Maynard

Personal details
- Born: 3 September 1978 (age 47) Ascot, Berkshire, England
- Party: Labor
- Website: www.jessicashaw.com.au

Jessica Jane Shaw (born 3 September 1978) is an Australian politician. She has been a Labor member of the Western Australian Legislative Assembly since the 2017 state election, representing Swan Hills.

Shaw was born in England and emigrated to Australia with her family in 1988. She studied law at Cambridge University and worked as a consultant for an engineering firm before entering politics.

On 3 June 2024, it was announced that Shaw would be retiring from politics at the 2025 state election as she wants to focus on "addressing climate change and effecting energy transition".

Western Australian Legislative Assembly
Preceded by Frank Alban	Member for Swan Hills; 2017–2025	Succeeded by Michelle Maynard
