= June van de Klashorst =

Australian politician

Member of the Western Australian Parliament for Swan Hills
- In office 6 February 1993 – 10 February 2001
- Preceded by: Gavan Troy
- Succeeded by: Jaye Radisich

Personal details
- Born: June Dorothy Wellstead; 1 June 1938 (age 87) Teddington, England
- Citizenship: Australian
- Party: Liberal
- Spouse: Franciscus van de Klashorst
- Profession: Teacher

June Dorothy van de Klashorst (née Wellstead) (born 1 June 1938) is an Australian politician. She was a Liberal Party member of the Western Australian Legislative Assembly from 1993 to 2001, representing the electorate of Swan Hills. She was Minister for Family and Children's Services, Minister for Seniors and Minister for Women's Interests in the Court government from December 1999 to February 2001.

== Early life ==
Van de Klashorst was born in England, and arrived in Australia with her family in June 1951. She attended Princess May High School and Fremantle Technical School, and worked in secretarial and management roles before becoming a teacher.

== Career ==
Van de Klashorst joined the Liberal Party in 1985, and was a founding member of the Gidgegannup branch. She was elected to the Legislative Assembly at the 1993 state election, winning the Swan Hills electorate from Labor after the retirement of Gavan Troy. She served on the House Committee (1993–1994), Joint Standing Committee on Delegated Legislation (1994–1996) and Library Committee (1997–1998). She also served on the Select Committee on Intervention in Childbirth (1994–1995), Select Committee on Heavy Transport (1994–1996) and the Select Committee on Crime Prevention (1997–1999).

The pro-choice van de Klashorst played a significant role in the push to reform Western Australia's abortion laws in 1998 after two doctors were charged with criminal offences. She initially came out in support of Labor MLC Cheryl Davenport's bill to repeal the section of the Criminal Code that made abortion illegal, and planned to introduce the Davenport bill in the Legislative Assembly as a bipartisan effort. The Liberal-National coalition rejected van de Klashorst's position, instead deciding to move its own rival reform bill, to which van de Klashorst was reported to be "close to tears". In the subsequent debate, van de Klashorst successfully advocated an additional requirement that women be offered counselling when seeking an abortion. The reform push was ultimately successful, with a compromise passing both houses after the Legislative Council initially backed the Davenport bill and the Legislative Assembly the government bill.

Van de Klashorst was Parliamentary Secretary for the Minister for Justice from January 1997 to December 1999, when she was promoted into the ministry after the resignation of Rhonda Parker. She served as Minister for Family and Children's Services, Minister for Seniors and Minister for Women's Interests from 1999 until the 2001 state election, when she was unexpectedly defeated by 24-year-old Labor candidate Jaye Radisich.

Western Australian Legislative Assembly
Preceded by Gavan Troy	Member of Parliament for Swan Hills; 1993–2001	Succeeded by Jaye Radisich
