= Jaye Radisich =

Australian politician

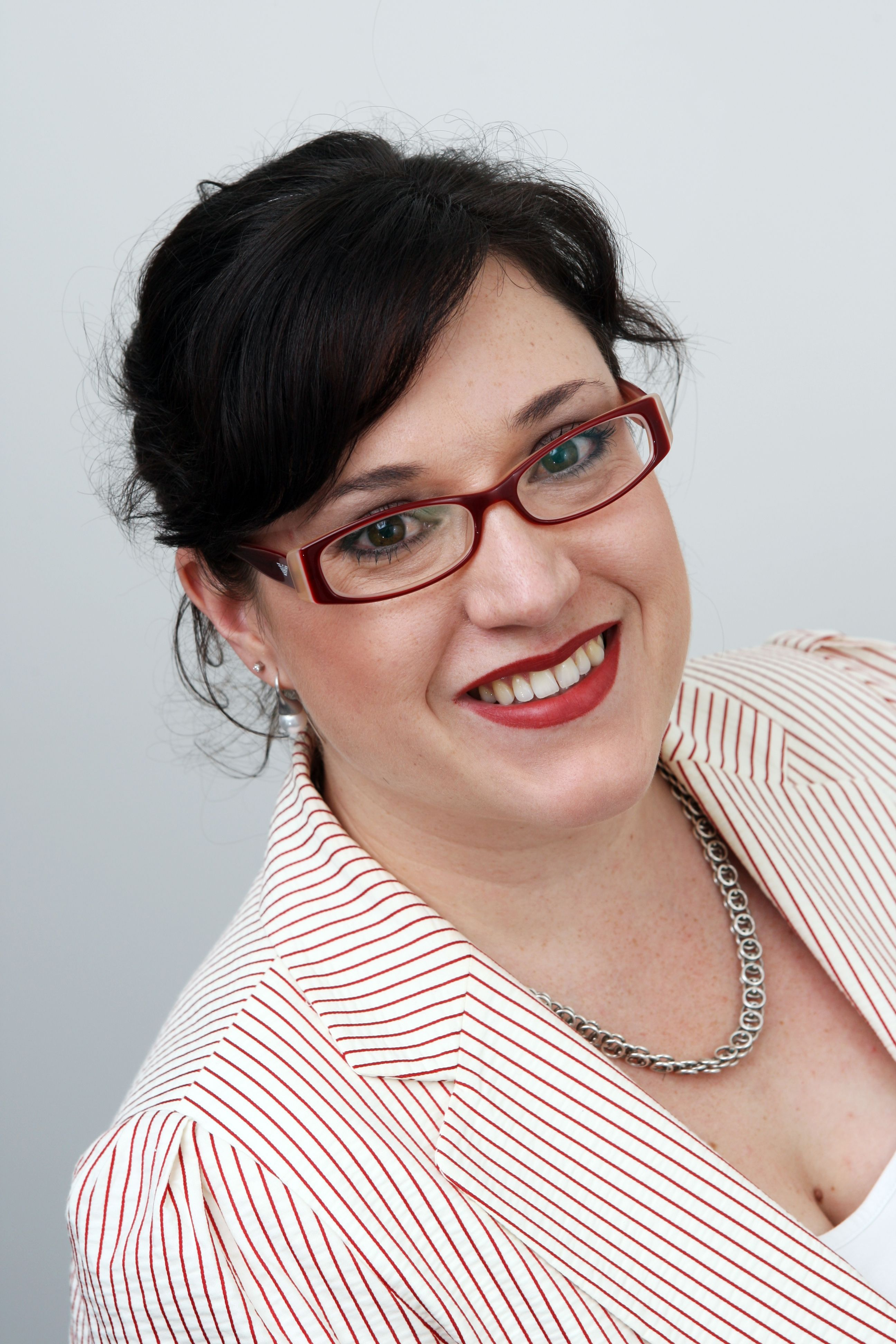

Member of the Western Australian Legislative Assembly for Swan Hills
- In office 10 February 2001 – 6 September 2008
- Preceded by: June van de Klashorst
- Succeeded by: Frank Alban

Personal details
- Born: Jaye Amber Radisich; 29 March 1976 Middle Swan, Western Australia, Australia
- Died: 17 March 2012 (aged 35) Subiaco, Western Australia, Australia
- Party: Labor Party
- Education: BA, LLB

Jaye Amber Radisich (29 March 1976 – 17 March 2012) was an Australian politician. She was a Labor Party member of the Western Australian Legislative Assembly from 2001 to 2008, representing the electorate of Swan Hills. Radisich was the youngest woman ever to be elected to the Western Australian parliament.

== Early life ==
Radisich was born and raised in Perth, Western Australia. At 12 years of age, she was awarded a Citizenship Award from the City of Stirling Council for her all round academic performance and community involvement.

Radisich attended Mount Lawley Senior High School. In Year 12, Radisich was appointed as School Prefect, Caltex All-rounder, and Belle of the Ball. Radisich was also a member of the Senior Debating Team and a participant on numerous committees including the Student Council, Common Room and Amnesty International.

Radisich went on to study arts, law and commerce at the University of Western Australia. Radisich became involved in student politics while at university, and served as a member of the National Union of Students executive, and the Vice-President (Asia-Pacific) of the International Union of Socialist Youth. While at university, she worked two jobs, as a check-out operator at a budget cosmetics chain and a research officer. She was juggling these commitments with the final year of her degree when she won pre-selection to contest the theoretically safe Liberal seat of Swan Hills as the Labor candidate for the 2001 state election.

== Political career ==
Swan Hills was held by a sitting Liberal minister in the Court government, June van de Klashorst, and in the leadup to the poll, there was little sign that she was in any danger of losing the seat. In a major upset, the Labor vote increased enough that Radisich was able to narrowly defeat van de Klashorst with the assistance of Liberals for Forests and One Nation preferences. She became the second-youngest person, and the youngest woman, to be elected to the Western Australian parliament.

She faced re-election at the February 2005 election, and was widely expected to lose her seat, due to the surprise result that had elected her in 2001 and a redistribution that had further slashed her tenuous margin. Radisich herself claimed that "many people" had anticipated her defeat. However, as the election drew closer, some analysts began to predict that she could hold on. These assertions were proved correct when, on election day, Radisich received a swing of more than 3%, and held onto her seat.

Radisich served as Chair of the Economics and Industry Standing Committee from 2005 to 2007. In 2006 Radisich tabled a report on the production and marketing of foodstuffs. The report examined the market dominance of the major retail chains and also analysed issues relating to the health and safety of our food, labelling requirements and the production and marketing of foodstuffs. The committee recommended a new way forward in support of consumer information about the food we eat that is grown, farmed or fished in WA by way of a voluntary state of origin certification and marketing program.

Radisich's parliamentary service culminated in her appointment as Parliamentary Secretary to the Minister for Energy, Resources, Industry and Enterprise in April 2007. Radisich also served on the Joint Standing Committee on the Anti-Corruption Commission and the Public Accounts Committee during her term.

In the leadup to the 2008 state election, Radisich sought preselection for the new seat of West Swan, a safer seat for Labor than the more marginal Swan Hills. However, after reports stating that she would likely lose in any preselection contest for West Swan to Rita Saffioti, the chief of staff to Premier Alan Carpenter, she announced that she would retire from politics at the next election. Radisich expressed a desire to pursue other ambitions, including post-graduate study and public policy interests at a Federal level. Graham Giffard, a then-sitting MLC, won Labor Party pre-selection for Swan Hills and lost the seat to the Liberal candidate Frank Alban in the 2008 election.

== Post-political career ==
=== Council of Small Business Australia ===
In February 2009, Radisich was selected from 160 applicants for the position of chief executive officer at the Council of Small Business Australia (COSBOA). During her tenure, Radisich successfully lobbied to prevent the Australian Federal Communications Minister from extending the "Do Not Call" Register to business numbers. She also oversaw a twelvefold increase in revenue.

Radisich demonstrated a solid track record of working with the private sector as CEO of COSBOA. She formed a partnership between COSBOA, Telstra and the Federal Government to deliver information to small businesses about new, modernised awards following the introduction of the Fair Work Act in July 2009.

Radisich resigned from the position in May 2010.

== Illness and death ==
=== Initial diagnosis ===
In 2002, during the early months of her first parliamentary term, Radisich was diagnosed with adult wilms tumour, a rare form of cancer. She had the kidney containing the tumour removed and continued to work as a member of parliament while undergoing subsequent chemotherapy.

=== Secondary diagnosis ===
In November 2010 Radisich was again diagnosed with a wilms tumour in her remaining kidney. Radisich underwent surgery to remove the tumour while preserving her kidney, followed by a course of chemotherapy. Radisich was informed that no further treatment for the cancer was required in June 2011. A routine scan conducted in October 2011 revealed that the cancer had aggressively returned and she was informed that surgery and cancer treatments available in Australia would not remedy her condition, only prolong her death.

Radisich underwent Sonodynamic, Photodynamic, P53 Gene, Ozone and Dendritic Cell therapies in Xi'an, China from October til December 2011. Due to a lack of accessible and accurate information available about the alternative treatments, she maintained a blog to share her experience with other cancer sufferers also considering the treatments.

The alternative treatments in China ultimately proved unsuccessful. The cancer continued to spread and Radisich succumbed to her condition at approximately 11 am, 17 March 2012, aged 35.

Western Australian Legislative Assembly
Preceded by June van de Klashorst	Member of Parliament for Swan Hills; 2001–2008	Succeeded by Frank Alban
