= Frank Alban =

Australian politician (born 1949)

Member of the Western Australian Legislative Assembly for Swan Hills
- In office 6 September 2008 – 11 March 2017
- Preceded by: Jaye Radisich
- Succeeded by: Jessica Shaw

Personal details
- Born: Francesco Angelo Alban; 14 November 1949 (age 76) Ostiglia, Italy
- Party: Liberal Party

Francesco Angelo "Frank" Alban (born 14 November 1949) is a former Western Australian politician. He was born in Ostiglia, Italy, and arrived in Western Australia in February 1956. He was a Liberal Party member of the Western Australian Legislative Assembly from 2008 to 2017, representing Swan Hills. He won the seat after the retirement of sitting Labor MLA Jaye Radisich.

Since November 2008, Alban has been a member of both the Procedure and Privileges Committee and the Joint Standing Committee on the Corruption and Crime Commission in the WA State Parliament.

Western Australian Legislative Assembly
Preceded by Jaye Radisich	Member for Swan Hills; 2008–2017	Succeeded by Jessica Shaw
