= John Fischer (politician) =

Australian politician

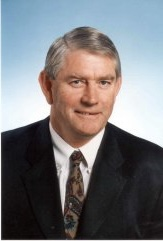
- Fischer in 2001

Leader of One Nation
- In office 5 August 2002 – 1 June 2004
- National Director: Brian Burston
- Preceded by: Pauline Hanson
- Succeeded by: Ian Nelson

Leader of One Nation Western Australia
- In office 10 February 2001 – 1 June 2004
- Deputy: Frank Hough
- Preceded by: Office established
- Succeeded by: Colin Tincknell

Member of the Legislative Council for Mining and Pastoral
- In office 10 February 2001 – 26 February 2005
- Succeeded by: Ken Baston

Personal details
- Born: John Duncombe Fischer; 3 June 1947 (age 79) Fremantle, Western Australia, Australia
- Party: Independent (since 2004)
- Other political affiliations: One Nation (1998–2004)
- Occupation: Company director (Self–employed)
- Profession: Businessman politician

John Duncombe Fischer (born 3 June 1947) is a former Australian politician.

== Biography ==
=== Early life ===
Fischer was born on 3 June 1947 in Fremantle, Western Australia.

=== Career ===
Fischer worked as a business owner before entering politics.

In 2001, he was elected to the Western Australian Legislative Council for Mining and Pastoral, representing One Nation. His election was contested by supporters of Liberal candidate Greg Smith, to no avail. In his inaugural speech, he criticised the privatisation of the Commonwealth Bank, suggesting it encouraged the company to close down local branches in small towns across Western Australia to increase profit, leading to the dismantling of those towns. He also criticised the privatisation of Telstra, suggesting it would decrease its coverage in rural Western Australia and thus making life in small towns more difficult. Additionally, he criticised the United Nations and the High Court of Australia for implementing international treaties and covenants with no say from the Western Australian population. He added that even though he was opposed to multiculturalism, he was not a xenophobe or a racist.

He served as the Vice President of One Nation until 2002, when he served as its Leader.

After the resignation of Paddy Embry, he and Frank Hough were the party's only MPs in Western Australia. In June 2004, he and Hough both resigned from the party to sit as independents. Fischer, unlike Embry and Hough, did not join the New Country Party and was defeated as an independent in 2005. He has subsequently contested elections affiliated with Graeme Campbell, a former Labor MP and founder of the Australia First Party.
