= Paddy Embry =

Australian politician (1942–2026)

President of the New Country Party
- In office 9 January 2004 – 24 November 2007
- Deputy: Frank Hough; Jeff Knuth
- Preceded by: Party established
- Succeeded by: Chris Dodoff

Leader of Pauline Hanson's One Nation in Western Australia
- In office 3 October 1998 – 15 May 2003
- Leader: John Fischer
- Preceded by: Office established
- Succeeded by: Frank Hough

Member of the Western Australian Legislative Council for South West
- In office 22 May 2001 – 21 May 2005

Personal details
- Born: Patrick Paul Elliot Embry; 19 October 1942 Oundle, England
- Died: 14 April 2026 (aged 83) Western Australia
- Party: New Country (2004–2008)
- Other political affiliations: One Nation (1998–2003); Independent (2003–2004)
- Spouse: Patricia (Trish) Finnegan
- Children: 4
- Parent(s): Basil Embry; Margaret Elliot
- Occupation: Politician
- Profession: Politician

Patrick Paul Elliot "Paddy" Embry (19 October 1942 – 14 April 2026) was an Australian politician. The son of highly decorated Royal Air Force commander Air Chief Marshal Basil Embry, he emigrated from England to Western Australia as a teenager. He served as a member of the Western Australian Legislative Council for the South West Region from 2001 to 2005, initially for Pauline Hanson's One Nation, before resigning and co-founding the short-lived New Country Party.

== Early life ==
Embry was born on 19 October 1942 in Oundle, England, the son of Air Chief Marshal Sir Basil Edward Embry and Lady Margaret (Hope) Elliot. His family emigrated to Australia in 1956, and Embry arrived in Western Australia in December that year.

== Political career ==
Embry joined Pauline Hanson's One Nation in 1998 and quickly rose to become the party's state vice-president (1999–2001) and a member of its policy committee. He was elected to the Legislative Council in the 2001 state election as one of three One Nation MLCs for the South West Region.

Citing internal divisions within the party, Embry resigned from One Nation on 15 May 2003 and sat as an independent.

In January 2004, Embry and fellow ex-One Nation MLC Frank Hough co-founded the New Country Party, positioning it as a rural-focused alternative. Embry served as its president until 2007. He denied claims that it was simply a One Nation clone. The party was unsuccessful in the 2005 state election, and Embry lost his seat.

After leaving parliament, he contested the 2010 federal election for the Australian Senate in Western Australia as an independent but was unsuccessful.

== Personal life and death ==
Embry married Patricia (Trish) Finnegan; the couple had four children. He died on 14 April 2026, aged 83.
