= Frank Hough =

Australian politician (born 1944)

Federal Deputy President of the New Country Party
- In office 9 January 2004 – 21 May 2005
- Leader: Paddy Embry
- Preceded by: Party established
- Succeeded by: Jeff Knuth

State Leader of the Pauline Hanson's One Nation in Western Australia
- In office 15 May 2003 – 1 June 2004
- Leader: John Fischer
- Preceded by: Paddy Embry
- Succeeded by: Ron McLean

Member of the Western Australian Legislative Council for Agricultural Region
- In office 22 May 2001 – 21 May 2005

Personal details
- Born: Francis Carson Hough; 12 April 1944 (age 82) Subiaco, Western Australia, Australia
- Party: Independent (2004; 2005–2013; 2015–present)
- Other political affiliations: One Nation (1998–2004); New Country (2004–2005); Palmer United (2013–2015)
- Occupation: Small business proprietor (self-employed)

Francis Carson Hough (born 12 April 1944) is a former Australian politician who remains politically active. Born in Subiaco, Western Australia, he was a self-employed business proprietor before entering politics. In 2001, he was elected to the Western Australian Legislative Council for Agricultural Region as a member of One Nation. After the resignation from the party of Paddy Embry in 2003, he and John Fischer were One Nation's only MPs in Western Australia. On 1 June 2004, he and Fischer both resigned from the party to sit as independents. On 30 November 2004, Hough and Embry co-founded the New Country Party, and contested the 2005 state election as such. Both were defeated. He ran as the Palmer United Party candidate for the Division of Pearce at the 2013 federal election. At the 2017 state election, he ran unsuccessfully as an independent for the Agricultural Region.

In 2003, he called for a citizens' referendum on bringing back Capital punishment in Australia.
