= Electoral district of Swan Hills =

State electoral district in Perth, Western Australia

Swan Hills Western Australia—Legislative Assembly
- Interactive map of electoral district boundaries from the 2025 state election
- State: Western Australia
- Dates current: 1989–present
- MP: Michelle Maynard
- Party: Labor
- Namesake: Swan Valley; Perth Hills
- Electors: 33,397 (2025)
- Area: 849 km^{2} (327.8 sq mi)
- Demographic: Metropolitan
- Coordinates: 31.75°S 116.03°E
Electorates around Swan Hills:
Wanneroo	Mid-West	Central Wheatbelt
Landsdale	Swan Hills
West Swan	Midland	Kalamunda

Swan Hills is an electoral district of the Legislative Assembly in the Australian state of Western Australia.

The district is located in the outer north-east of Perth.

Swan Hills is a marginal seat. It has been held by the government of the day on every occasion since its creation in 1989.

== Geography ==
Based in the north-east corner of Perth's Metropolitan Region Scheme, Swan Hills covers large parts of the Swan Valley and Darling Scarp. The district takes in the communities of Aveley, Bailup, Belhus, Brigadoon, Bullsbrook, Chidlow, Ellenbrook, Gidgegannup, Melaleuca, Mount Helena, Sawyers Valley, The Vines, Upper Swan and Wooroloo.

== History ==
First contested at the 1989 state election, Swan Hills was created to replace the abolished seat of Mundaring. It was won on that occasion by Labor MP Gavan Troy, who had been the member for Mundaring since 1983. Troy retired at the 1993 state election, and the seat was picked up by the Liberal candidate June van de Klashorst when her party won government at the same election.

Two terms later, at the 2001 state election the seat again changed hands with a change of government. The new Labor MP was 24-year-old Jaye Radisich. Radisich retired at the 2008 state election, having failed to win Labor endorsement to contest a safer seat. The seat was then gained by Liberal candidate Frank Alban, continuing the pattern of seat going with the party that wins government.

Radisich died of cancer in 2012, and Labor recruited her brother, Ian Radisich, to challenge Alban at the 2013 state election. However, Alban easily won re-election as the Liberal-National government retained office with an increased majority. Alban was defeated by Jessica Shaw in the 2017 election by a large margin.

Shaw stood down at the 2025 state election and was succeeded by Michelle Maynard.

== Members for Swan Hills ==
Member	Party	Term
Gavan Troy	Labor	1989–1993
June van de Klashorst	Liberal	1993–2001
Jaye Radisich	Labor	2001–2008
Frank Alban	Liberal	2008–2017
Jessica Shaw	Labor	2017–2025
Michelle Maynard	Labor	2025–present

== Election results ==
2025 Western Australian state election: Swan Hills
Party	Candidate	Votes	%	±%
Labor	Michelle Maynard	11,839	43.2	−27.5
Liberal	Rod Henderson	6,883	25.1	+6.7
Greens	Christopher Poulton	2,760	10.1	+6.1
National	Ben Giblett	2,174	7.9	+7.9
One Nation	Scott Wilkinson	2,115	7.7	+7.7
Christians	Magdeleen Strauss	993	3.6	+0.9
Shooters, Fishers, Farmers	Ross Williamson	617	2.3	+2.3
Total formal votes		27,381	95.1	−0.3
Informal votes		1,421	4.9	+0.3
Turnout		28,802	86.2	+9.3
Two-party-preferred result
Labor	Michelle Maynard	15,979	58.4	−18.8
Liberal	Rod Henderson	11,375	41.6	+18.8
Labor hold		Swing	−18.8	
