= Graham Giffard =

Australian politician

Member of the Legislative Council of Western Australia
- In office 7 February 2000 – 11 August 2008
- Constituency: North Metropolitan Region

Personal details
- Born: 21 February 1959 (age 67) Camberwell, Victoria, Australia
- Party: Labor Party
- Spouse: Mandy
- Education: BA MA
- Profession: Industrial Officer CFMEU

Graham Thomas Giffard (born 21 February 1959) is an Australian politician. He was a Labor member of the Western Australian Legislative Council from 2000 to 2008, representing the North Metropolitan Region.

Born in Camberwell, Victoria, Giffard moved to Western Australia in 1981 and joined the Labor Party in 1986. For two years he worked for the member for Fremantle, John Dawkins and then another two years for secretary of the Cabinet, Bill Thomas.

For the following eight years Giffard worked for the Builders Labourers Federation.

He was first elected to Parliament in February 2000 on a countback for the South Metropolitan Region after the resignation of John Halden, and subsequently re-elected to the North Metropolitan Region in the 2001 and 2005 state elections he is a member of the Labor Party.

Giffard resigned his seat on 11 August 2008 to stand as the Labor Party candidate for the Legislative Assembly district of Swan Hills at the 2008 state election. He was defeated by Liberal Party candidate Frank Alban.
