= New Country Party =

Former Australian political party

- Founded: 9 January 2004
- Split from: One Nation
- Ideology: Australian nationalism Hansonism; Social conservatism
- Political position: Right-wing
- Slogan: “Australia's Voice”
- Western Australian Legislative Council: 2 / 34 (2004–2005)

The New Country Party was a minor political party in Australia. It emerged from the internal divisions of the One Nation Party in Queensland and Western Australia in 2003 (in a similar fashion to the City Country Alliance) and was registered by the Australian Electoral Commission on 9 January 2004. Two Western Australian state upper house MPs elected on One Nation tickets, Paddy Embry and Frank Hough, joined the party and were its only serving MPs until their defeat in the Western Australian state election in 2005.

In the leadup to the October 2004 federal election, there was some suggestion that Queensland independent MP Bob Katter would run on the New Country Party ticket. However, he did not do so. The party ran Senate tickets in Western Australia, Queensland and New South Wales, where it got 0.18%, 0.13% and 0.16% of the vote respectively, and obtained 0.08% of the vote nationwide in the lower house.

In February 2005, the party contested the Western Australian state election, and gained 0.31% of the upper house vote statewide, and 0.11% of the lower house vote. Both sitting members lost their seats to major party candidates.

The NCP contested the 2008 Western Australian state election, but won only 0.05% of the primary vote for the Legislative Council. The party has since been de-registered by the Western Australian Electoral Commission.

The party's website no longer appears to exist, but is archived.
