= Members of the Western Australian Legislative Assembly, 2005–2008 =

This is a list of members of the Western Australian Legislative Assembly from 2005 to 2008:

Name	Party	District	Years in office
Paul Andrews	Labor	Southern River	2001–2008
Colin Barnett	Liberal	Cottesloe	1990–2018
Matt Birney	Liberal	Kalgoorlie	2001–2008
John Bowler	Labor/Independent ^{[3]}	Murchison-Eyre	2001–2013
Troy Buswell	Liberal	Vasse	2005–2014
Alan Carpenter	Labor	Willagee	1996–2009
John Castrilli	Liberal	Bunbury	2005–2017
Liz Constable	Independent	Churchlands	1991–2013
Murray Cowper	Liberal	Murray	2005–2017
John D'Orazio	Labor/Independent/ Labor/Independent ^{[2]}	Ballajura	2001–2008
John Day	Liberal	Darling Range	1993–2017
Judy Edwards	Labor	Maylands	1990–2008
Geoff Gallop^{[1]}	Labor	Victoria Park	1986–2006
Brendon Grylls	National	Merredin	2001–2017
Dianne Guise	Labor	Wanneroo	2001–2008
Kim Hames	Liberal	Dawesville	1993–2001; 2005–2017
Shane Hill	Labor	Geraldton	2001–2008
Katie Hodson-Thomas	Liberal	Carine	1996–2008
Judy Hughes	Labor	Kingsley	2005–2008
John Hyde	Labor	Perth	2001–2013
Graham Jacobs	Liberal	Roe	2005–2017
Rob Johnson	Liberal	Hillarys	1993–2017
John Kobelke	Labor	Balcatta	1989–2013
Bob Kucera	Labor/Independent^{[8]}	Yokine	2001–2008
Fran Logan	Labor	Cockburn	2001–2021
Jim McGinty	Labor	Fremantle	1990–2009
Mark McGowan	Labor	Rockingham	1996–2023
John McGrath	Liberal	South Perth	2005–2021
Sheila McHale	Labor	Kenwick	1996–2008
Tony McRae	Labor	Riverton	2001–2008
Alannah MacTiernan	Labor	Armadale	1996–2010
Norm Marlborough^{[4]}	Labor	Peel	1986–2006
Carol Martin	Labor	Kimberley	2001–2013
Mick Murray	Labor	Collie-Wellington	2001–2021
Tony O'Gorman	Labor	Joondalup	2001–2013
Paul Omodei	Liberal/Independent ^{[9]}	Warren-Blackwood	1989–2008
Paul Papalia^{[4]}	Labor	Peel	2007–2026
Christian Porter^{[5]}	Liberal	Murdoch	2008–2013
John Quigley	Labor	Mindarie	2001–2025
Margaret Quirk	Labor	Girrawheen	2001–2025
Jaye Radisich	Labor	Swan Hills	2001–2008
Terry Redman	National	Stirling	2005–2021
Fred Riebeling	Labor	North West Coastal	1992–2008
Eric Ripper	Labor	Belmont	1988–2013
Michelle Roberts	Labor	Midland	1994–2025
Tony Simpson	Liberal	Serpentine-Jarrahdale	2005–2017
Gary Snook	Liberal	Moore	2005–2008
Trevor Sprigg^{[5]}	Liberal	Murdoch	2005–2008
Tom Stephens	Labor	Central Kimberley-Pilbara	2005–2013
Dan Sullivan	Liberal/Independent/ Family First^{[7]}	Leschenault	1996–2008
David Templeman	Labor	Mandurah	2001–2025
Steve Thomas	Liberal	Capel	2005–2008
Max Trenorden	National	Avon	1986–2008
Terry Waldron	National	Wagin	2001–2017
Sue Walker	Liberal/Independent^{[6]}	Nedlands	2001–2008
Peter Watson	Labor	Albany	2001–2021
Martin Whitely	Labor	Bassendean	2001–2013
Grant Woodhams	National	Greenough	2005–2013
Janet Woollard	Independent	Alfred Cove	2001–2013
Ben Wyatt^{[1]}	Labor	Victoria Park	2006–2021

== Notes ==
^{1} On 16 January 2006, the Labor member for Victoria Park and Premier, Geoff Gallop, resigned due to recently diagnosed depression. Labor candidate Ben Wyatt was elected to replace him at the by-election for Victoria Park on 11 March 2006.
^{2} On 25 August 2006, the Labor member for Ballajura and former Minister for Police, John D'Orazio, was expelled from the Labor Party after being involved in a series of public controversies. He continued to sit in parliament as an independent. On 18 April 2008, he was readmitted to the Labor Party after being cleared of corruption allegations, but resigned again on 26 June 2008.
^{3} On 27 February 2006, the Labor member for Murchison-Eyre, John Bowler, was sacked as Minister for Resources and expelled from the Labor Party after he was discovered to have leaked confidential Cabinet information to disgraced lobbyists Julian Grill and Brian Burke. He served out the remainder of his term as an independent, and won the seat of Kalgoorlie at the 2008 election.
^{4} On 10 November 2006, the Labor member for Peel, Norm Marlborough, resigned after being sacked from Cabinet for lying to the Corruption and Crime Commission about his dealings with disgraced former Premier Brian Burke. Labor candidate Paul Papalia was elected to replace him at the by-election for Peel on 3 February 2007.
^{5} On 17 January 2008, the Liberal member for Murdoch, Trevor Sprigg, died of a heart attack. Liberal candidate Christian Porter was elected to replace him at the by-election for Murdoch on 23 February 2008.
^{6} On 7 February 2008, the Liberal member for Nedlands and former Shadow Attorney-General, Sue Walker, left the Liberal Party after Troy Buswell became the party leader. She served out the remainder of her term as an independent, but failed to retain her seat at the 2008 election.
^{7} On 23 February 2008, the Liberal member for Leschenault, former deputy Liberal leader Dan Sullivan, left the party. He continued to sit in parliament as an independent, and on 20 June 2008, launched and became the inaugural leader of the WAFamilyFirst.com Party, the state branch of the Family First Party. He failed to retain his seat at the 2008 election.
^{8} On 19 May 2008, the Labor member for Yokine and former Assistant Police Commissioner, Bob Kucera, left the Labor Party after it confirmed he was ineligible to contest preselection under party rules. He served out the remainder of his term as an independent and did not contest the 2008 election.
^{9} On 19 June 2008, the Liberal member for Warren-Blackwood and former Opposition Leader, Paul Omodei, left the Liberal Party. He served out the remainder of his term as an independent and did not contest the 2008 election.

== See also ==
- 2005 Western Australian state election
