= Electoral results for the district of Victoria Park =

Western Australian district election results

This is a list of electoral results for the electoral district of Victoria Park in Western Australian state elections.

== Members for Victoria Park ==
Member	Party	Term
Howard Raphael	Labor	1930–1944
William Read	Independent	1945–1953
Hugh Andrew	Labor	1953–1961
Ron Davies	Labor	1961–1986
Dr Geoff Gallop	Labor	1986–2006
Ben Wyatt	Labor	2006–2021
Hannah Beazley	Labor	2021–present

== Election results ==
=== Elections in the 2020s ===
2025 Western Australian state election: Victoria Park
Party	Candidate	Votes	%	±%
Labor	Hannah Beazley	11,323	45.7	−18.0
Liberal	Andra Biondi	6,512	26.3	+9.8
Greens	Jack Gordon-Manley	5,113	20.6	+8.1
Christians	Linda Watson	1,116	4.5	+2.2
Animal Justice	Roberta Vlaar	738	3.0	+3.0
Total formal votes		24,802	96.4	−0.3
Informal votes		924	3.6	+0.3
Turnout		25,726	83.7	+3.4
Two-party-preferred result
Labor	Hannah Beazley	16,550	66.7	−10.9
Liberal	Andra Biondi	8,249	33.3	+10.9
Labor hold		Swing	−10.9	

2021 Western Australian state election: Victoria Park
Party	Candidate	Votes	%	±%
Labor	Hannah Beazley	14,673	63.7	+12.6
Liberal	Amanda-Sue Markham	3,733	16.2	−12.0
Greens	Gerard Siero	2,912	12.6	−2.0
Liberal Democrats	Aaron Farrell	542	2.4	+2.4
Christians	Janine Vander Ven	522	2.3	−1.4
No Mandatory Vaccination	Sue-Ann Connolly	350	1.5	+1.5
One Nation	Darren Sandow	307	1.3	+1.3
Total formal votes		23,039	96.7	+1.1
Informal votes		782	3.3	−1.1
Turnout		23,821	83.0	+0.8
Two-party-preferred result
Labor	Hannah Beazley	17,932	77.8	+11.1
Liberal	Amanda-Sue Markham	5,105	22.2	−11.1
Labor hold		Swing	+11.1	

=== Elections in the 2010s ===
2017 Western Australian state election: Victoria Park
Party	Candidate	Votes	%	±%
Labor	Ben Wyatt	11,574	51.0	+6.4
Liberal	Julian Jacobs	6,396	28.2	−14.5
Greens	Ryan Quinn	3,272	14.4	+2.2
Christians	Mark Staer	915	4.0	+4.0
Micro Business	Jennifer Noye	520	2.3	+2.3
Total formal votes		22,677	95.7	+2.3
Informal votes		1,025	4.3	−2.3
Turnout		23,702	84.1	+0.0
Two-party-preferred result
Labor	Ben Wyatt	15,064	66.5	+12.5
Liberal	Julian Jacobs	7,595	33.5	−12.5
Labor hold		Swing	+12.5	

2013 Western Australian state election: Victoria Park
Party	Candidate	Votes	%	±%
Labor	Ben Wyatt	8,978	44.7	–2.1
Liberal	Haider Zaman	8,591	42.7	+8.3
Greens	Sarah Newbold	2,528	12.6	–1.4
Total formal votes		20,097	93.5	−1.8
Informal votes		1,402	6.5	+1.8
Turnout		21,499	85.6	
Two-party-preferred result
Labor	Ben Wyatt	10,865	54.1	–4.9
Liberal	Haider Zaman	9,226	45.9	+4.9
Labor hold		Swing	–4.9	

=== Elections in the 2000s ===
2008 Western Australian state election: Victoria Park
Party	Candidate	Votes	%	±%
Labor	Ben Wyatt	9,137	46.8	−2.3
Liberal	Ben Travia	6,723	34.4	+4.6
Greens	Kim Lisson	2,726	13.9	+4.6
Christian Democrats	Saskia Matthews	490	2.5	−0.4
Family First	James Olsen	468	2.4	+2.4
Total formal votes		19,544	95.2	+0.1
Informal votes		979	4.8	−0.1
Turnout		20,523	84.8	
Two-party-preferred result
Labor	Ben Wyatt	11,523	59.0	−4.7
Liberal	Ben Travia	8,012	41.0	+4.7
Labor hold		Swing	−4.7	

2006 Victoria Park state by-election
Party	Candidate	Votes	%	±%
Labor	Ben Wyatt	7,786	49.38	−7.93
Liberal	Bruce Stevenson	4,887	30.99	+3.24
Greens	Dee Margetts	1,328	8.42	−0.25
Christian Democrats	Bill Heggers	551	3.49	−0.13
One Nation	Sue Bateman	436	2.76	+0.10
Independent	Andrew Owens	217	1.38	+1.38
Daylight Saving	James Dunn	156	0.99	+0.99
Family First	Peter Greaves	151	0.96	+0.96
Socialist Alliance	John Tattersall	131	0.83	+0.83
Independent	Mike Ward	83	0.53	+0.53
Independent	Teresa van Lieshout	43	0.27	+0.27
Total formal votes		15,769	96.26	+1.58
Informal votes		612	3.74	−1.58
Turnout		16,381	64.04	−23.62
Two-party-preferred result
Labor	Ben Wyatt	9,632	61.18	−4.86
Liberal	Bruce Stevenson	6,111	38.82	+4.86
Labor hold		Swing	−4.86	

2005 Western Australian state election: Victoria Park
Party	Candidate	Votes	%	±%
Labor	Geoff Gallop	12,432	57.3	+5.3
Liberal	Neil Fearis	6,019	27.7	+1.5
Greens	Dave Fort	1,880	8.7	+0.8
Christian Democrats	Brett Crook	785	3.6	+3.1
One Nation	Sue Bateman	576	2.7	−4.6
Total formal votes		21,692	94.7	−0.2
Informal votes		1,219	5.3	+0.2
Turnout		22,911	87.7	
Two-party-preferred result
Labor	Geoff Gallop	14,314	66.0	+1.9
Liberal	Neil Fearis	7,362	34.0	−1.9
Labor hold		Swing	+1.9	

2001 Western Australian state election: Victoria Park
Party	Candidate	Votes	%	±%
Labor	Geoff Gallop	10,833	51.9	+4.2
Liberal	Sandra Brown	5,612	26.9	−9.0
Greens	Juanita Miller	1,685	8.1	+1.8
One Nation	Peter David	1,417	6.8	+6.8
Democrats	Collin Mullane	825	4.0	−1.1
Curtin Labor Alliance	Andrew Fox	487	2.3	+2.3
Total formal votes		20,859	95.1	−0.4
Informal votes		1,078	4.9	+0.4
Turnout		21,937	88.5	
Two-party-preferred result
Labor	Geoff Gallop	13,236	63.8	+6.0
Liberal	Sandra Brown	7,503	36.2	−6.0
Labor hold		Swing	+6.0	

=== Elections in the 1990s ===
1996 Western Australian state election: Victoria Park
Party	Candidate	Votes	%	±%
Labor	Geoff Gallop	9,725	47.7	+0.8
Liberal	Bruce Stevenson	7,313	35.9	−4.2
Greens	Phil Farren	1,289	6.3	+0.4
Democrats	Anne Millar	1,042	5.1	+2.3
Independent	John Collins	1,015	5.0	+5.0
Total formal votes		20,384	95.5	+0.3
Informal votes		963	4.5	−0.3
Turnout		21,347	88.4	
Two-party-preferred result
Labor	Geoff Gallop	11,756	57.8	+3.0
Liberal	Bruce Stevenson	8,570	42.2	−3.0
Labor hold		Swing	+3.0	

1993 Western Australian state election: Victoria Park
Party	Candidate	Votes	%	±%
Labor	Geoff Gallop	8,927	46.7	−2.3
Liberal	Betsy Kennish	7,649	40.0	+3.3
Greens	Andrew Thomson	1,209	6.3	+6.3
Independent	Ian Tracy	787	4.1	+4.1
Democrats	Daniel Bagster	560	2.9	−2.7
Total formal votes		19,132	95.3	+3.8
Informal votes		953	4.7	−3.8
Turnout		20,085	91.8	+2.8
Two-party-preferred result
Labor	Geoff Gallop	10,513	55.0	−2.4
Liberal	Betsy Kennish	8,619	45.0	+2.4
Labor hold		Swing	−2.4	

=== Elections in the 1980s ===
1989 Western Australian state election: Victoria Park
Party	Candidate	Votes	%	±%
Labor	Geoff Gallop	9,130	49.0	−13.7
Liberal	Katherine Mair	6,846	36.7	−0.6
Democrats	Marion Hercock	1,035	5.6	+5.6
Grey Power	Joseph Mitchell	951	5.1	+5.1
Independent	Michael Ward	671	3.6	+3.6
Total formal votes		18,633	91.5	
Informal votes		1,736	8.5	
Turnout		20,369	89.0	
Two-party-preferred result
Labor	Geoff Gallop	10,692	57.4	−5.3
Liberal	Katherine Mair	7,941	42.6	+5.3
Labor hold		Swing	−5.3	

1986 Victoria Park state by-election
Party	Candidate	Votes	%	±%
Labor	Geoff Gallop	6,449	52.2	−12.7
Liberal	Diane Airey	4,597	37.2	+2.1
Independent	Peter Lesiter	719	5.8	+5.8
Democrats	John Rogers	597	4.8	+4.8
Total formal votes		12,362	96.6	−0.5
Informal votes		438	3.4	+0.5
Turnout		12,800	77.2	−13.0
Labor hold		Swing	N/A	

- Preferences were not distributed.

1986 Western Australian state election: Victoria Park
Party	Candidate	Votes	%	±%
Labor	Ron Davies	9,335	64.9	−2.2
Liberal	Diane Airey	5,050	35.1	+2.2
Total formal votes		14,385	97.1	0.0
Informal votes		434	2.9	0.0
Turnout		14,819	90.2	+5.1
Labor hold		Swing	−2.2	

1983 Western Australian state election: Victoria Park
Party	Candidate	Votes	%	±%
Labor	Ron Davies	9,038	67.1	
Liberal	Pauline Iles	4,432	32.9	
Total formal votes		13,470	97.1	
Informal votes		396	2.9	
Turnout		13,866	85.1	
Labor hold		Swing		

1980 Western Australian state election: Victoria Park
Party	Candidate	Votes	%	±%
Labor	Ron Davies	7,880	62.4	+2.8
Liberal	Michael Smith	4,430	35.1	−5.3
Socialist Workers	Peter Holloway	323	2.6	+2.6
Total formal votes		12,633	96.2	−0.1
Informal votes		501	3.8	+0.1
Turnout		13,134	86.7	−3.0
Two-party-preferred result
Labor	Ron Davies	8,171	64.7	+5.1
Liberal	Michael Smith	4,462	35.3	−5.1
Labor hold		Swing	+5.1	

=== Elections in the 1970s ===
1977 Western Australian state election: Victoria Park
Party	Candidate	Votes	%	±%
Labor	Ron Davies	8,203	59.6	
Liberal	Michael Smith	5,563	40.4	
Total formal votes		13,766	96.3	
Informal votes		531	3.7	
Turnout		14,297	89.7	
Labor hold		Swing		

1974 Western Australian state election: Victoria Park
Party	Candidate	Votes	%	±%
Labor	Ron Davies	8,869	63.3	
Liberal	Frank Marciano	4,171	29.8	
National Alliance	Paul Daly	962	6.9	
Total formal votes		14,002	95.9	
Informal votes		598	4.1	
Turnout		14,600	87.7	
Two-party-preferred result
Labor	Ron Davies	9,013	64.4	
Liberal	Frank Marciano	4,989	35.6	
Labor hold		Swing		

1971 Western Australian state election: Victoria Park
Party	Candidate	Votes	%	±%
Labor	Ron Davies	8,553	75.2	−24.8
Democratic Labor	Benjamin Ballantyne	2,824	24.8	+24.8
Total formal votes		11,377	94.7	
Informal votes		634	5.3	
Turnout		12,011	90.5	
Labor hold		Swing	N/A	

=== Elections in the 1960s ===
1968 Western Australian state election: Victoria Park
Party	Candidate	Votes	%	±%
Labor	Ron Davies	unopposed		
Labor hold		Swing		

1965 Western Australian state election: Victoria Park
Party	Candidate	Votes	%	±%
Labor	Ron Davies	6,183	64.0	+0.1
Liberal and Country	Nicholas Di Lello	3,482	36.0	−0.1
Total formal votes		9,665	96.0	−3.0
Informal votes		401	4.0	+3.0
Turnout		10,066	92.1	−3.5
Labor hold		Swing	−0.1	

1962 Western Australian state election: Victoria Park
Party	Candidate	Votes	%	±%
Labor	Ron Davies	6,527	63.9	
Liberal and Country	John Stanbridge	3,691	36.1	
Total formal votes		10,218	99.0	
Informal votes		107	1.0	
Turnout		10,325	95.6	
Labor hold		Swing		

1961 Victoria Park state by-election
Party	Candidate	Votes	%	±%
Labor	Ron Davies	5,003	57.6	+6.3
Liberal and Country	David Hooper	2,788	32.1	−1.4
Democratic Labor	Bernard Harrison	889	10.2	−3.2
Total formal votes		8,680	98.1	+0.2
Informal votes		171	1.9	−0.2
Turnout		8,851	86.8	−5.9
Labor hold		Swing	N/A	

- Preferences were not distributed.

=== Elections in the 1950s ===
1959 Western Australian state election: Victoria Park
Party	Candidate	Votes	%	±%
Labor	Hugh Andrew	4,878	51.3	−10.9
Liberal and Country	David Hooper	3,188	33.5	−4.3
Independent	Harold Hawthorne	789	8.3	+8.3
Democratic Labor	William Carter	663	7.0	+7.0
Total formal votes		9,518	97.9	+0.1
Informal votes		199	2.1	−0.1
Turnout		9,717	92.7	−0.1
Two-party-preferred result
Labor	Hugh Andrew		56.4	−5.8
Liberal and Country	David Hooper		43.6	+5.8
Labor hold		Swing	−5.8	

- Two party preferred vote was estimated.

1956 Western Australian state election: Victoria Park
Party	Candidate	Votes	%	±%
Labor	Hugh Andrew	5,663	62.2	
Liberal and Country	Benjamin Marshall	3,444	37.8	
Total formal votes		9,107	97.8	
Informal votes		209	2.2	
Turnout		9,316	92.8	
Labor hold		Swing		

1953 Western Australian state election: Victoria Park
Party	Candidate	Votes	%	±%
Labor	Hugh Andrew	4,222	55.5	+7.9
Liberal and Country	George Kerr	2,532	33.3	+33.3
Independent	Harold Hawthorne	715	9.4	+9.4
Communist	Neil Payne	141	1.9	+1.9
Total formal votes		7,610	96.9	−1.4
Informal votes		247	3.1	+1.4
Turnout		7,857	93.5	+2.0
Two-party-preferred result
Labor	Hugh Andrew		60.3	+12.7
Liberal and Country	George Kerr		39.7	+39.7
Labor gain from Independent		Swing	N/A	

1950 Western Australian state election: Victoria Park
Party	Candidate	Votes	%	±%
Independent	William Read	4,113	52.4	
Labor	Hugh Andrew	3,735	47.6	
Total formal votes		7,848	98.3	
Informal votes		134	1.7	
Turnout		7,982	91.5	
Independent hold		Swing		

=== Elections in the 1940s ===
1947 Western Australian state election: Victoria Park
Party	Candidate	Votes	%	±%
Independent	William Read	4,939	55.1	+55.1
Labor	Charles Johnson	4,024	44.9	−21.3
Total formal votes		8,963	98.1	+0.7
Informal votes		171	1.9	−0.7
Turnout		9,134	88.9	−2.4
Independent gain from Labor		Swing	N/A	

- Victoria Park was won by the Independent member William Read at the 1945 by-election upon the death of the sitting Labor member Howard Stirling.

1945 Victoria Park state by-election
Party	Candidate	Votes	%	±%
Independent	William Read	2,537	33.1	+33.1
Labor	Harry Martin	2,410	31.5	–34.7
Independent Labor	John MacMillan	1,709	22.3	+22.3
All-Parties League	Carlyle Ferguson	527	6.9	+6.9
Independent	Joseph Cole	258	3.4	+3.4
Liberal	James Collins	220	2.9	+2.9
Total formal votes		7,661	96.8	–0.6
Informal votes		253	3.2	+0.6
Turnout		7,914	82.2	–9.1
Two-candidate-preferred result
Independent	William Read	4,340	56.7	+56.7
Labor	Harry Martin	3,321	43.3	–22.9
Independent gain from Labor		Swing	+56.7	

1943 Western Australian state election: Victoria Park
Party	Candidate	Votes	%	±%
Labor	Howard Raphael	5,446	66.2	−1.8
Nationalist	Albert Hansen	2,785	33.8	+1.8
Total formal votes		8,231	97.4	−1.1
Informal votes		218	2.6	+1.1
Turnout		8,449	91.3	−2.3
Labor hold		Swing	−1.8	

=== Elections in the 1930s ===
1939 Western Australian state election: Victoria Park
Party	Candidate	Votes	%	±%
Labor	Howard Raphael	5,538	68.0	−3.8
Independent	James Milligan	2,604	32.0	+32.0
Total formal votes		8,142	98.5	−0.4
Informal votes		127	1.5	+0.4
Turnout		8,269	93.6	+20.8
Labor hold		Swing	N/A	

1936 Western Australian state election: Victoria Park
Party	Candidate	Votes	%	±%
Labor	Howard Raphael	4,158	71.8	+2.2
Nationalist	George Mann	1,637	28.2	+8.2
Total formal votes		5,795	98.9	+1.5
Informal votes		63	1.1	−1.5
Turnout		5,858	72.8	−20.1
Labor hold		Swing	N/A	

1933 Western Australian state election: Victoria Park
Party	Candidate	Votes	%	±%
Labor	Howard Raphael	4,700	69.6	+21.2
Nationalist	Charles Harper	1,354	20.0	−11.6
Nationalist	Oliver Strang	700	10.4	+10.4
Total formal votes		6,754	97.4	−1.5
Informal votes		181	2.6	+1.5
Turnout		6,935	92.9	+11.0
Labor hold		Swing	N/A	

- Preferences were not distributed.

1930 Western Australian state election: Victoria Park
Party	Candidate	Votes	%	±%
Labor	Howard Raphael	2,757	48.4	
Nationalist	Charles Harper	1,796	31.6	
Independent Labor	Frederick White	1,138	20.0	
Total formal votes		5,691	98.9	
Informal votes		65	1.1	
Turnout		5,756	81.9	
Two-party-preferred result
Labor	Howard Raphael	3,220	56.6	
Nationalist	Charles Harper	2,471	43.4	
Labor hold		Swing		
