= Electoral results for the district of Cockburn =

Western Australian district election results

This is a list of electoral results for the electoral district of Cockburn in Western Australian state elections.

== Members for Cockburn ==
Member	Party	Term
Henry Curran	Labor	1962–1968
Don Taylor	Labor	1968–1984
Clive Hughes	Labor	1984–1986
Norm Marlborough	Labor	1986–1989
Bill Thomas	Labor	1989–2001
Fran Logan	Labor	2001–2021
David Scaife	Labor	2021–present

== Election results ==
=== Elections in the 2020s ===
2025 Western Australian state election: Cockburn
Party	Candidate	Votes	%	±%
Labor	David Scaife	14,219	52.2	−17.7
Liberal	Brunetta Di Russo	6,750	24.8	+7.2
Greens	Brendan Graham Sturcke	3,282	12.0	+5.9
Legalise Cannabis	Christopher Rennick	1,577	5.8	+5.8
Christians	Gopi Veloo	1,424	5.2	+5.2
Total formal votes		27,252	95.0	−1.2
Informal votes		1,422	5.0	+1.2
Turnout		28,674	87.4	+6.7
Two-party-preferred result
Labor	David Scaife	18,479	67.8	−10.2
Liberal	Brunetta Di Russo	8,764	32.2	+10.2
Labor hold		Swing	−10.2	

2021 Western Australian state election: Cockburn
Party	Candidate	Votes	%	±%
Labor	David Scaife	17,714	68.4	+16.7
Liberal	Owen Mulder	4,822	18.6	−9.8
Greens	Jesse Smith	1,655	6.4	−2.5
No Mandatory Vaccination	Elspeth Taimre	461	1.8	+1.8
One Nation	Igor Mironenko	456	1.8	−0.1
WAxit	Andrew Baker	426	1.6	+0.4
Liberal Democrats	Brian Murray	374	1.4	+1.4
Total formal votes		25,908	96.3	+1.4
Informal votes		995	3.7	−1.4
Turnout		26,903	87.4	+1.1
Two-party-preferred result
Labor	David Scaife	19,870	76.7	+12.4
Liberal	Owen Mulder	6,024	23.3	−12.4
Labor hold		Swing	+12.4	

=== Elections in the 2010s ===
2017 Western Australian state election: Cockburn
Party	Candidate	Votes	%	±%
Labor	Fran Logan	12,460	53.6	+5.4
Liberal	Lavin Raja-Yogam	6,389	27.5	−14.0
Greens	Shannon Hewitt	2,071	8.9	+1.3
Independent	Steve Portelli	1,194	5.1	+5.1
Christians	Edward Roose	592	2.5	+2.5
Micro Business	Connor McHugh	264	1.1	+1.1
Flux the System!	Erinn Stanfield	264	1.1	+1.1
Total formal votes		23,234	94.5	+0.0
Informal votes		1,354	5.5	−0.0
Turnout		24,588	88.1	+3.4
Two-party-preferred result
Labor	Fran Logan	15,311	65.9	+11.3
Liberal	Lavin Raja-Yogam	7,911	34.1	−11.3
Labor hold		Swing	+11.3	

2013 Western Australian state election: Cockburn
Party	Candidate	Votes	%	±%
Labor	Fran Logan	10,628	47.8	–0.5
Liberal	Don Barrett	9,336	42.0	+10.1
Greens	Shannon Hewitt	1,687	7.6	–5.0
Independent	Derek Rosborough	578	2.6	+2.6
Total formal votes		22,229	94.7	+2.1
Informal votes		1,235	5.3	−2.1
Turnout		23,464	90.7	
Two-party-preferred result
Labor	Fran Logan	11,993	54.1	–5.1
Liberal	Don Barrett	10,178	45.9	+5.1
Labor hold		Swing	–5.1	

=== Elections in the 2000s ===
2008 Western Australian state election: Cockburn
Party	Candidate	Votes	%	±%
Labor	Fran Logan	9,620	48.70	−4.1
Liberal	Donald Barrett	6,188	31.32	+6.2
Greens	Andrew Sullivan	2,531	12.81	+5.9
Independent	Mary Jenkins	1,416	7.17	+7.2
Total formal votes		19,755	92.43	+1.3
Informal votes		1,617	7.57	−1.3
Turnout		21,372	87.45	
Two-party-preferred result
Labor	Fran Logan	11,773	59.60	−5.2
Liberal	Donald Barrett	7,982	40.40	+5.2
Labor hold		Swing	−5.2	

2005 Western Australian state election: Cockburn
Party	Candidate	Votes	%	±%
Labor	Fran Logan	12,570	55.3	+0.6
Liberal	John Jamieson	5,289	23.3	+2.8
Greens	Anne Otness	1,547	6.8	−3.3
Family First	Damon Fowler	1,278	5.6	+5.6
Independent	Robyn Scherr	804	3.5	+3.5
One Nation	Carol Teather	650	2.9	−7.1
Christian Democrats	Bill Heggers	605	2.7	+2.7
Total formal votes		22,743	93.0	−1.9
Informal votes		1,722	7.0	+1.9
Turnout		24,465	90.2	
Two-party-preferred result
Labor	Fran Logan	15,084	66.4	−3.0
Liberal	John Jamieson	7,640	33.6	+3.0
Labor hold		Swing	−3.0	

2001 Western Australian state election: Cockburn
Party	Candidate	Votes	%	±%
Labor	Fran Logan	12,527	53.9	+3.0
Liberal	Sandra Comley	5,453	23.5	−10.0
Greens	Heather Smedley	2,610	11.2	+2.6
One Nation	Jerry Gier	1,722	7.4	+7.4
Democrats	Andrew Donaldson	912	3.9	−3.1
Total formal votes		23,224	94.1	+0.0
Informal votes		1,447	5.9	−0.0
Turnout		24,671	92.8	
Two-party-preferred result
Labor	Fran Logan	15,693	68.3	+7.7
Liberal	Sandra Comley	7,289	31.7	−7.7
Labor hold		Swing	+7.7	

=== Elections in the 1990s ===
1996 Western Australian state election: Cockburn
Party	Candidate	Votes	%	±%
Labor	Bill Thomas	10,326	50.9	−3.4
Liberal	Wendy Blake	6,793	33.5	−2.1
Greens	Nadine Lapthorne	1,749	8.6	+2.1
Democrats	Jakica Zaknic	1,427	7.0	+3.8
Total formal votes		20,295	94.1	−0.2
Informal votes		1,267	5.9	+0.2
Turnout		21,562	91.9	
Two-party-preferred result
Labor	Bill Thomas	12,245	60.6	+0.2
Liberal	Wendy Blake	7,976	39.4	−0.2
Labor hold		Swing	+0.2	

1993 Western Australian state election: Cockburn
Party	Candidate	Votes	%	±%
Labor	Bill Thomas	10,578	58.2	−0.2
Liberal	Janette McTaggart	5,944	32.7	+2.5
Greens	Margaret-Mary Jenkins	1,046	5.8	+5.8
Democrats	Lynda Somers	623	3.4	+3.4
Total formal votes		18,191	94.1	+7.0
Informal votes		1,134	5.9	−7.0
Turnout		19,325	94.6	+2.1
Two-party-preferred result
Labor	Bill Thomas	11,648	64.0	−0.6
Liberal	Janette McTaggart	6,543	36.0	+0.6
Labor hold		Swing	−0.6	

=== Elections in the 1980s ===
1989 Western Australian state election: Cockburn
Party	Candidate	Votes	%	±%
Labor	Bill Thomas	9,206	58.4	−17.1
Liberal	Simon O'Brien	4,753	30.1	+7.0
Grey Power	Isobel Davison	1,056	6.7	+6.7
Alternative Coalition	Alison Jensen	750	4.8	+4.8
Total formal votes		15,765	87.1	
Informal votes		2,331	12.9	
Turnout		18,096	92.5	
Two-party-preferred result
Labor	Bill Thomas	10,183	64.6	−11.8
Liberal	Simon O'Brien	5,582	35.4	+11.8
Labor hold		Swing	−11.8	

1986 Cockburn state by-election
Party	Candidate	Votes	%	±%
Labor	Norm Marlborough	9,346	50.3	−24.4
Liberal	Mark Iriks	4,832	26.0	+0.7
Independent Labor	Lawrence Humphreys	3,450	18.6	+18.6
Independent	Linda McLaughlan	950	5.1	+5.1
Total formal votes		18,578	95.9	−0.2
Informal votes		793	4.1	+0.2
Turnout		19,371	83.7	−9.8
Labor hold		Swing	N/A	

- Preferences were not distributed.

1986 Western Australian state election: Cockburn
Party	Candidate	Votes	%	±%
Labor	Clive Hughes	15,328	74.7	−3.9
Liberal	Mark Iriks	5,202	25.3	+3.9
Total formal votes		20,530	96.1	+0.4
Informal votes		829	3.9	−0.4
Turnout		21,359	93.5	−0.7
Labor hold		Swing	−3.9	

1984 Cockburn state by-election
Party	Candidate	Votes	%	±%
Labor	Clive Hughes	11,270	67.6	−11.0
Liberal	Anthony Seman	4,481	26.9	+5.5
Independent	Giuseppe De Petra	934	5.6	+5.6
Total formal votes		16,685	94.8	−0.9
Informal votes		906	5.2	+0.9
Turnout		17,591	79.9	−14.3
Labor hold		Swing	N/A	

- Preferences were not distributed.

1983 Western Australian state election: Cockburn
Party	Candidate	Votes	%	±%
Labor	Don Taylor	12,461	78.6	
Liberal	Gregory Bowler	3,398	21.4	
Total formal votes		15,859	95.7	
Informal votes		704	4.3	
Turnout		16,563	94.2	
Labor hold		Swing		

1980 Western Australian state election: Cockburn
Party	Candidate	Votes	%	±%
Labor	Don Taylor	10,173	73.1	+5.6
Liberal	Herbert Fancott	3,748	26.9	−5.6
Total formal votes		13,921	95.2	−1.3
Informal votes		706	4.8	+1.3
Turnout		14,627	89.4	−1.5
Labor hold		Swing	+5.6	

=== Elections in the 1970s ===
1977 Western Australian state election: Cockburn
Party	Candidate	Votes	%	±%
Labor	Don Taylor	9,171	67.5	
Liberal	George Grljusich	4,407	32.5	
Total formal votes		13,578	96.5	
Informal votes		486	3.5	
Turnout		14,064	90.9	
Labor hold		Swing		

1974 Western Australian state election: Cockburn
Party	Candidate	Votes	%	±%
Labor	Don Taylor	10,058	70.3	
Liberal	Lloyd Read-Brain	3,531	24.7	
National Alliance	Clifford Webb	712	5.0	
Total formal votes		14,301	7.1	
Informal votes		1,100	7.1	
Turnout		15,401	89.5	
Two-party-preferred result
Labor	Don Taylor	10,165	71.1	
Liberal	Lloyd Read-Brain	4,136	28.9	
Labor hold		Swing		

1971 Western Australian state election: Cockburn
Party	Candidate	Votes	%	±%
Labor	Don Taylor	12,580	73.3	+4.7
Democratic Labor	Henry Miller	2,592	15.1	+15.1
Communist	Victor Williams	1,990	11.6	+11.6
Total formal votes		17,162	94.0	−1.1
Informal votes		1,092	6.0	+1.1
Turnout		18,254	92.4	−0.3
Two-candidate-preferred result
Labor	Don Taylor	14,073	82.0	+13.4
Democratic Labor	Henry Miller	3,089	18.0	+18.0
Labor hold		Swing	N/A	

=== Elections in the 1960s ===
1968 Western Australian state election: Cockburn
Party	Candidate	Votes	%	±%
Labor	Don Taylor	8,360	68.6	
Liberal and Country	Stanley Elliman	3,825	31.4	
Total formal votes		12,185	95.1	
Informal votes		622	4.9	
Turnout		12,807	92.7	
Labor hold		Swing		

1965 Western Australian state election: Cockburn
Party	Candidate	Votes	%	±%
Labor	Henry Curran	unopposed		
Labor hold		Swing		

1962 Western Australian state election: Cockburn
Party	Candidate	Votes	%	±%
Labor	Henry Curran	6,034	65.0	
Liberal and Country	James Burns	2,544	27.4	
Democratic Labor	Maurice Robinson	713	7.7	
Total formal votes		9,291	98.0	
Informal votes		191	2.0	
Turnout		9,482	94.5	
Two-party-preferred result
Labor	Henry Curran		66.1	
Liberal and Country	James Burns		33.9	
Labor hold		Swing		

- Two party preferred vote was estimated.
