= Electoral results for the district of Peel =

Western Australian district election results

This is a list of electoral results for the Electoral district of Peel in Western Australian elections.

== Members for Peel ==
Member	Party	Term
Norm Marlborough	Labor	1989–2006
Paul Papalia	Labor	2007–2008

== Election results ==
=== Elections in the 2000s ===
2007 Peel state by-election
Party	Candidate	Votes	%	±%
Labor	Paul Papalia	10,801	50.48	−4.50
Liberal	Graeme Coleman	5,179	24.21	−4.81
Greens	Dawn Jecks	1,941	9.07	+2.70
Independent	Gerard Kettle	1,062	4.96	+4.96
One Nation	Craig Bradshaw	913	4.27	+2.08
Christian Democrats	Brent Tremain	871	4.07	+0.31
Independent	Robert Woodward	461	2.15	+2.15
Citizens Electoral Council	Brian McCarthy	168	0.79	+0.40
Total formal votes		21,396	96.39	+1.57
Informal votes		801	3.61	−1.57
Turnout		22,197	79.54	−10.28
Two-party-preferred result
Labor	Paul Papalia	13,811	64.59	+1.09
Liberal	Graeme Coleman	7,570	35.41	−1.09
Labor hold		Swing	+1.09	

2005 Western Australian state election: Peel
Party	Candidate	Votes	%	±%
Labor	Norm Marlborough	12,558	55.0	+5.0
Liberal	Rob Brown	6,628	29.0	+3.9
Greens	Julie Baker	1,456	6.4	−1.0
Christian Democrats	Brent Tremain	859	3.8	+3.8
Family First	Graham Winterbottom	751	3.3	+3.3
One Nation	William Ritchie	501	2.2	−9.9
Citizens Electoral Council	Mick Le-Cocq	90	0.4	+0.4
Total formal votes		22,843	94.8	−1.4
Informal votes		1,249	5.2	+1.4
Turnout		24,092	90.1	
Two-party-preferred result
Labor	Norm Marlborough	14,488	63.5	+0.2
Liberal	Rob Brown	8,328	36.5	−0.2
Labor hold		Swing	+0.2	

2001 Western Australian state election: Peel
Party	Candidate	Votes	%	±%
Labor	Norm Marlborough	14,509	52.8	−0.7
Liberal	John Wootton	5,962	21.7	+5.2
One Nation	Bill Holmes	3,480	12.7	+12.7
Greens	Jeff McGinniss	2,021	7.4	0.0
Democrats	Craig Wakeford	747	2.7	−2.4
Independent	Lynette Lowery-Small	354	1.3	+1.3
Curtin Labor Alliance	John Vickers	299	1.1	+1.1
	Alan Grafton	107	0.4	+0.4
Total formal votes		27,479	96.3	+1.4
Informal votes		1,049	3.7	−1.4
Turnout		28,528	91.0	
Two-party-preferred result
Labor	Norm Marlborough	17,984	66.5	+5.3
Liberal	John Wootton	9,040	33.5	−5.3
Labor hold		Swing	+5.3	

=== Elections in the 1990s ===
1996 Western Australian state election: Peel
Party	Candidate	Votes	%	±%
Labor	Norm Marlborough	11,605	53.5	−3.8
Independent	Bill Hall	3,817	17.6	+17.6
Liberal	James O'Malley	3,573	16.5	−12.6
Greens	Paul Lewis	1,604	7.4	−0.5
Democrats	David Coombs	1,100	5.1	+1.8
Total formal votes		21,699	94.9	−0.5
Informal votes		1,161	5.1	+0.5
Turnout		22,860	89.3	
Two-candidate-preferred result
Labor	Norm Marlborough	13,238	61.2	−2.7
Independent	Bill Hall	8,385	38.8	+38.8
Labor hold		Swing	−2.7	

1993 Western Australian state election: Peel
Party	Candidate	Votes	%	±%
Labor	Norm Marlborough	12,412	54.4	+1.8
Liberal	Margaret McMurdo	7,690	33.7	+4.0
Greens	Jeff Anderton	1,956	8.6	+8.6
Democrats	Huw Grossmith	747	3.3	+3.3
Total formal votes		22,805	95.5	+5.7
Informal votes		1,065	4.5	−5.7
Turnout		23,870	93.4	+2.1
Two-party-preferred result
Labor	Norm Marlborough	13,837	60.7	+1.3
Liberal	Margaret McMurdo	8,968	39.3	−1.3
Labor hold		Swing	+1.3	

=== Elections in the 1980s ===
1989 Western Australian state election: Peel
Party	Candidate	Votes	%	±%
Labor	Norm Marlborough	8,466	52.6	−17.4
Liberal	Marten Noordzy	4,782	29.7	+0.7
Grey Power	Desmond Swiney	1,428	8.9	+8.9
Independent	Michael Nella	1,411	8.8	+8.8
Total formal votes		16,087	89.8	
Informal votes		1,822	10.2	
Turnout		17,909	91.3	
Two-party-preferred result
Labor	Norm Marlborough	9,557	59.4	−11.1
Liberal	Marten Noordzy	6,530	40.6	+11.1
Labor hold		Swing	−11.1	
