= Victoria Park by-election =

Victoria Park state by-election may refer to:

- 2006 Victoria Park state by-election
- 1945 Victoria Park state by-election
