= Carpenter ministry =

The Carpenter Ministry was the 34th Ministry of the Government of Western Australia, and was led by Labor Premier Alan Carpenter and his deputy Eric Ripper. It succeeded the Gallop Ministry on 3 February 2006 due to the retirement of Geoff Gallop from politics on 25 January, and was in turn succeeded by the Barnett Ministry on 23 September 2008 after the Labor Party lost government at the state election held on 6 September.

== First Ministry ==
The Governor, Ken Michael, designated 17 principal executive offices of the Government under section 43(2) of the Constitution Acts Amendment Act 1899. The following ministers and parliamentary secretaries were then appointed to the positions, and served until the reconstitution of the Ministry on 13 December 2006. The list below is ordered by decreasing seniority within the Cabinet, as indicated by the Government Gazette and the Hansard index.

Office	Minister
Premier; Minister for Public Sector Management; Minister for State Development; Minister for Federal Affairs	Alan Carpenter, BA, MLA
Deputy Premier; Treasurer; Minister for Government Enterprises; Minister assisting the Minister for Public Sector Management	Eric Ripper, BA, Dip.Ed., MLA
Minister for Agriculture and Food; Minister for Forestry; Minister for the Mid West; Minister for the Wheatbelt; Leader of the Government in the Legislative Council	Kim Chance, MLC
Minister for Education and Training	Ljiljanna Ravlich, BA (SocSc), Dip.Ed., MLC
Minister for Police and Emergency Services (from 8 May 2006); Minister for Community Safety (from 8 May 2006); Minister for Water Resources; Minister for Sport and Recreation; Leader of the House in the Legislative Assembly	John Kobelke, BSc, Dip.Ed., JP, MLA^{[1]}
Attorney-General; Minister for Health; Minister for Electoral Affairs	Jim McGinty, BA, BJuris (Hons), LL.B., JP, MLA
Minister for Housing and Works; Minister for Consumer Protection; Minister for Heritage; Minister for Land Information	Michelle Roberts, BA, Dip.Ed., MLA
Minister for Planning and Infrastructure	Alannah MacTiernan, BA, LL.B., BJuris, JP, MLA
Minister for Indigenous Affairs; Minister for Tourism; Minister for Culture and the Arts	Sheila McHale, BA, Dip.Soc.Sci., JP, MLA
Minister for the Environment; Minister for Racing and Gaming	Mark McGowan, BA, LL.B., Dip LP, MLA
Minister for Energy; Minister for Science and Innovation	Fran Logan, BA (Hons), MLA
Minister for Resources; Minister assisting the Minister for State Development; Minister for Employment Protection; Minister for Goldfields-Esperance; Minister for Great Southern	John Bowler, JP, MLA
Minister for Police and Emergency Services (3 February–8 May 2006); Minister for Justice (3 February–8 May 2006); Minister for Community Safety (3 February–8 May 2006) Minister for Disability Services (8–9 May 2006); Minister for Citizenship and Multicultural Interests (8–9 May 2006); Minister for Seniors and Volunteering (8–9 May 2006)	John D'Orazio, BSc, MPS, MLA (3 February–9 May 2006)^{[1]}
Minister for Local Government and Regional Development; Minister for Fisheries; Minister for the Kimberley; Minister for the Pilbara; Minister for the Gascoyne	Jon Ford, JP, MLC
Minister for Disability Services (3 February–8 May 2006); Minister for Citizenship and Multicultural Interests (3 February–8 May 2006); Minister for Women's Interests Minister for Justice (8–26 May 2006); Minister for Disability Services (9–26 May 2006); Minister for Citizenship and Multicultural Interests (9–26 May 2006) Minister for Corrective Services (from 26 May 2006); Minister for Women's Interests; Minister for Small Business (from 9 November 2006); Minister assisting the Minister for Federal Affairs	Margaret Quirk, MA, LL.B. (Hons), MLA^{[1]}^{[2]}^{[3]}
Minister for Small Business; Minister for Peel and the South West; Minister assisting the Minister for Education and Training	Norm Marlborough, MLA (3 February–9 November 2006)^{[3]}
Minister for Community Development; Minister for Seniors and Volunteering; Minister for Youth Minister assisting the Minister for Planning and Infrastructure (3 February–26 May 2006)^{[2]}	David Templeman, BEd, DipTchg, MLA
Minister for Disability Services (from 26 May 2006); Minister for Citizenship and Multicultural Interests (from 26 May 2006); Minister assisting the Minister for Planning and Infrastructure (from 26 May 2006)	Tony McRae, MLA (from 26 May 2006)^{[2]}
Parliamentary Secretaries	Kate Doust, MLC; Sue Ellery, MLC; Adele Farina, MLC; Mick Murray, MLA; Tony McRae, MLA (3 February–26 May 2006)^{[2]} Peter Watson, MLA; Martin Whitely, BCom, MLA (from 26 May 2006)^{[2]}

^{1} On 8 May 2006, John D'Orazio, who had driven his ministerial car for two months with a suspended licence, was removed from his portfolios of Police and Emergency Services and Community Safety, which were reallocated to John Kobelke, and Justice, which was reallocated to Margaret Quirk. He was assigned to Quirk's portfolios of Disability Services and Citizenship and Multicultural Interests, and David Templeman's portfolio of Seniors and Volunteering. The following day, he resigned from the Ministry following criticism of the decision to retain him in Cabinet, and his new portfolios returned to their original holders.
^{2} On 26 May 2006, Tony McRae, previously a Parliamentary Secretary, was promoted to the Ministry, and was allocated the portfolios of Disability Services, Citizenship and Multicultural Interests previously held by Margaret Quirk, and became Minister assisting the Minister for Planning and Infrastructure, previously filled by David Templeman. The portfolio of Justice, held by Margaret Quirk, was renamed Corrective Services, while Martin Whitely was appointed to replace McRae as a Parliamentary Secretary.
^{3} On 9 November 2006, Norm Marlborough was removed from the Ministry and resigned from Parliament, triggering a by-election in his seat. His portfolio of Small Business was reallocated to Margaret Quirk, while Peel and the South West were reallocated to Mark McGowan.

== Second Ministry ==
On 13 December 2006, the Premier announced a major Cabinet reshuffle, with only five ministers being unaffected. Three ministers were demoted to junior posts—former Minister for Education Ljiljanna Ravlich, former Minister for Resources John Bowler and former Minister for Indigenous Affairs Sheila McHale. It was decided not to replace Norm Marlborough's position in the cabinet, vacated a month earlier, so the number of ministers decreased from 17 to 16. Apart from Tony McRae and John Bowler, the members remained Ministers until the end of the Carpenter Ministry on 23 September 2008.

Office	Minister
Premier; Minister for Federal-State Relations; Minister for Trade; Minister for Science and Innovation; Minister for Public Sector Management	Alan Carpenter, BA, MLA
Deputy Premier; Treasurer; Minister for State Development	Eric Ripper, BA, Dip.Ed., MLA
Minister for Agriculture and Food; Minister for Forestry; Minister for the Mid West; Minister for the Wheatbelt; Minister for Great Southern (from 2 March 2007); Leader of the Government in the Legislative Council	Kim Chance, MLC
Minister for Local Government (from 2 March 2007); Minister for Racing and Gaming (from 2 March 2007); Minister for Government Enterprises; Minister for Multicultural Interests and Citizenship; Minister for Goldfields-Esperance(from 2 March 2007); Minister for Youth; Minister assisting the Minister for Planning and Infrastructure	Ljiljanna Ravlich, BA (SocSc), Dip.Ed., MLC
Minister for Police and Emergency Services; Minister for Community Safety; Minister for Water Resources; Minister for Sport and Recreation; Leader of the House in the Legislative Assembly	John Kobelke, BSc, Dip.Ed., JP, MLA
Attorney-General; Minister for Health; Minister for Electoral Affairs	Jim McGinty, BA, BJuris (Hons), LL.B., JP, MLA
Minister for Employment Protection (2 March 2007 – 26 February 2008); Minister for Housing and Works; Minister for Heritage; Minister for Indigenous Affairs; Minister for Land Information	Michelle Roberts, BA, Dip.Ed., MLA
Minister for Planning and Infrastructure	Alannah MacTiernan, BA, LL.B., BJuris, JP, MLA
Minister for Disability Services (from 2 March 2007); Minister for Tourism; Minister for Culture and the Arts; Minister for Consumer Protection	Sheila McHale, BA, Dip.Soc.Sci., JP, MLA
Minister for Education and Training; Minister for the South West (26 February–2 March 2007)^{[1]} Minister for the Environment; Minister for Climate Change; Minister for Disability Services	Mark McGowan, BA, LL.B., Dip LP, MLA
Minister for Energy; Minister for Resources; Minister for Industry and Enterprise	Fran Logan, BA (Hons), MLA
Minister for Local Government; Minister for Employment Protection; Minister for Racing and Gaming; Minister for Goldfields-Esperance; Minister for Great Southern	John Bowler, JP, MLA (until 2 March 2007)^{[2]}
Minister for Employment Protection (from 26 February 2008); Minister for Regional Development; Minister for Fisheries; Minister for the Kimberley; Minister for the Pilbara; Minister for the Gascoyne	Jon Ford, JP, MLC
Minister for Corrective Services; Minister for Small Business; Minister for Women's Interests (until 2 March 2007); Minister assisting the Minister for Federal-State Relations (until 26 February 2008)	Margaret Quirk, MA, LL.B. (Hons), MLA
Minister for Child Protection (until 2 March 2007)^{[2]} Minister for Communities (until 2 March 2007); Minister for Seniors and Volunteering (until 2 March 2007); Minister for the Environment (from 2 March 2007); Minister for Climate Change (from 2 March 2007); Minister for the Peel Region	David Templeman, BEd, DipTchg, MLA
Minister for the Environment; Minister for Climate Change; Minister for Disability Services	Tony McRae, MLA (until 26 February 2007)^{[1]}
Minister for Child Protection; Minister for Communities; Minister for Women's Interests; Minister for Seniors and Volunteering	Sue Ellery, MLC (from 2 March 2007)
Parliamentary Secretaries	Kate Doust, MLC; Sue Ellery, MLC (until 2 March 2007); Adele Farina, BA, LL.B., MLC; John Hyde, MLA (from 11 April 2007); Mick Murray, MLA; Jaye Radisich, MLA (from 11 April 2007); Peter Watson, MLA; Martin Whitely, BCom, MLA

^{1} On 26 February 2007, Minister for the Environment Tony McRae was removed from the Ministry. Mark McGowan temporarily assumed McRae's three portfolios.
^{2} On 27 February 2007, John Bowler was removed from the Ministry and resigned from the Labor Party after details of his relationship with former Premier Brian Burke and fellow lobbyist Julian Grill. On 2 March 2007, his term as a minister formally concluded and the Premier reshuffled the Cabinet. The ministry was reduced from 16 to 15 members, whilst parliamentary secretary Sue Ellery was promoted to the ministry and the portfolios formerly assigned to McRae and Bowler were distributed.

== Notes ==
Preceded by Gallop Ministry	Carpenter Ministry; 2006-2008	Succeeded by Barnett Ministry
