= Electoral results for the district of Warnbro =

Western Australian district election results

This is a list of electoral results for the electoral district of Warnbro in Western Australian state elections.

== Members for Warnbro ==
Member	Party	Term
Paul Papalia	Labor	2008–2025

== Election results ==
=== Elections in the 2020s ===
2021 Western Australian state election: Warnbro
Party	Candidate	Votes	%	±%
Labor	Paul Papalia	19,300	76.9	+16.2
Liberal	Mark Jones	3,324	13.2	−2.7
Greens	Robert Delves	1,016	4.0	−2.9
One Nation	Liam Hall	616	2.5	−9.5
No Mandatory Vaccination	Brandon Suchalla-Young	463	1.8	+1.8
WAxit	Bob Velev	218	0.9	−0.1
Liberal Democrats	Cameron McMaster	171	0.7	+0.7
Total formal votes		25,108	96.4	+0.7
Informal votes		930	3.6	−0.7
Turnout		26,038	84.3	+3.1
Two-party-preferred result
Labor	Paul Papalia	20,945	83.4	+9.7
Liberal	Mark Jones	4,157	16.6	−9.7
Labor hold		Swing	+9.7	

=== Elections in the 2010s ===
2017 Western Australian state election: Warnbro
Party	Candidate	Votes	%	±%
Labor	Paul Papalia	13,821	60.6	+6.2
Liberal	Luke Muscedere	3,631	15.9	−20.7
One Nation	Alexander Scholz	2,721	11.9	+11.9
Greens	Jillian Cain	1,582	6.9	−2.0
Christians	Deonne Kingsford	540	2.4	+2.4
Matheson for WA	Thomas Hunter	286	1.3	+1.3
Micro Business	Samantha Figgins	218	1.0	+1.0
Total formal votes		22,799	95.7	+3.1
Informal votes		1,022	4.3	−3.1
Turnout		23,821	84.9	+3.3
Two-party-preferred result
Labor	Paul Papalia	16,800	73.7	+13.1
Liberal	Luke Muscedere	5,988	26.3	−13.1
Labor hold		Swing	+13.1	

2013 Western Australian state election: Warnbro
Party	Candidate	Votes	%	±%
Labor	Paul Papalia	12,153	52.8	+4.0
Liberal	Joel Marks	8,846	38.4	+6.7
Greens	Jordon Steele-John	2,016	8.8	–3.4
Total formal votes		23,015	92.7	−2.1
Informal votes		1,800	7.3	+2.1
Turnout		24,815	88.4	
Two-party-preferred result
Labor	Paul Papalia	13,534	58.8	–1.3
Liberal	Joel Marks	9,481	41.2	+1.3
Labor hold		Swing	–1.3	

=== Elections in the 2000s ===
2008 Western Australian state election: Warnbro
Party	Candidate	Votes	%	±%
Labor	Paul Papalia	9,666	48.5	−4.4
Liberal	Shane Bathgate	6,412	32.1	+0.7
Greens	Colin Booth	2,414	12.1	+5.7
Family First	Matt Pollock	1,457	7.3	+4.3
Total formal votes		19,949	94.9	−0.1
Informal votes		1,066	5.1	+0.1
Turnout		21,015	86.3	
Two-party-preferred result
Labor	Paul Papalia	11,907	59.7	−1.5
Liberal	Shane Bathgate	8,039	40.3	+1.5
Labor hold		Swing	−1.5	
