= Ellie Whiteaker =

Australian politician

Senator Ellie Whiteaker

Senator for Western Australia
- Incumbent
- Assumed office 1 July 2025
- Preceded by: Louise Pratt

Secretary of the WA Labor Party
- In office 11 July 2022 – July 2025
- Preceded by: Tim Picton
- Succeeded by: Mark Reed

Deputy secretary of the WA Labor Party
- In office 2018 – 11 July 2022

Personal details
- Party: Labor
- Other political affiliations: Labor Left
- Spouse: David Scaife

Eleanor Elizabeth Margaret Whiteaker is an Australian politician who is a Senator for Western Australia, having been elected in the 2025 federal election. Her six-year term began on 1 July 2025.

Prior to her election to the Senate, she is the first female Party Secretary of the WA State Branch of the Australian Labor Party since July 2022, having served as its deputy secretary previously since 2018.

== Early life ==
Whiteaker was born in Kalamunda, Western Australia. As a small child she moved with her family to Kalgoorlie, where she completed her primary school education. Whiteaker attended high school at Comet Bay College, in Rockingham's Secret Harbour.

She initially attended the University of Western Australia, but completed her studies at Monash University, graduating with a Bachelor of Arts in 2018.

== Career ==
Whiteaker formerly worked as a campaign organiser for UnionsWA, as an organiser for the AMWU, and as an adviser to Senator Louise Pratt.

She assumed position of State Secretary upon resignation of then incumbent Tim Picton in the WA Labor state executive on 11 July 2022. She also became the WA Labor Party's first female party secretary.

In 2024, Whiteaker was preselected as a WA Labor candidate for the Australian Senate in the 2025 federal election and was selected for the number one spot on the ticket. She was successfully elected and began her term on 1 July 2025.

== Political views ==
Whiteaker is affiliated with the AMWU and is part of the Labor Left. Her first speech highlighted support for policies promoting gender equality, workers’ rights, and public sector investment in health care and manufacturing. She is an advocate for women's health care access and has been public about her experience with endometriosis.

== Personal life ==
Whiteaker is married to David Scaife, the state MLA for Cockburn with whom she shares a son, William.
