= Hannah Beazley =

Australian politician

The Honourable Hannah Beazley MLA

Minister for Local Government
- Incumbent
- Assumed office 8 December 2023
- Premier: Roger Cook
- Preceded by: David Michael

Minister for Youth
- Incumbent
- Assumed office 8 December 2023
- Premier: Roger Cook
- Preceded by: Simone McGurk

Minister for Disability Services
- Incumbent
- Assumed office 19 March 2025
- Premier: Roger Cook
- Preceded by: Don Punch

Member of the Western Australian Legislative Assembly for Victoria Park
- Incumbent
- Assumed office 13 March 2021
- Preceded by: Ben Wyatt

Personal details
- Born: Subiaco, Western Australia
- Party: Labor
- Parent: Kim Beazley (father)
- Website: www.hannahbeazley.com

Hannah Mary Beazley is an Australian politician. She has been a Labor member of the Western Australian Legislative Assembly since the 2021 state election, representing Victoria Park.

== Early life and education ==
Hannah Beazley was born in the Perth suburb of Subiaco. She is the daughter of Australian Labor Party leader Kim Beazley, a former federal opposition leader and deputy prime minister.

She has a BA in arts management.

== Political career ==
Beazley first contested in the 2013 state election in the electorate of Riverton but was unsuccessful. She then ran in the 2019 federal election in her father's former seat of Swan. She achieved a minor swing but ultimately lost to incumbent Steve Irons.

In March 2020, following Treasurer Ben Wyatt's announcement that he would retire from parliament at the next election, Beazley was preselected for his seat of Victoria Park. However, later that month, Wyatt reversed his decision to quit and announced he would stay on to assist the McGowan government in the state's economic recovery from the COVID-19 crisis. Beazley then stood aside from the seat and was subsequently selected to contest in the South West region of the Western Australian Legislative Council. In November 2020, Wyatt announced his intention to retire for the second time and Beazley was once again selected to be the candidate for Victoria Park. She was elected with an increased margin in the 2021 state election. In her election campaigns, Beazley received support through EMILY's List Australia.

In December 2022, she became a parliamentary secretary to Stephen Dawson, the minister for emergency services, innovation and the digital economy, medical research, and volunteering.

In December 2023, following Bill Johnston's announcement that he would retire from the Ministry and not contest the next election, Beazley was elevated to the vacancy cabinet position and given the positions of Minister for Local Government, Minister for Youth and Minister Assisting the Minister for Training and Workforce Development.

Beazley was re-elected in the 2025 Western Australian state election.

== 2026 threat ==
On 20 October 2026, a 56-year-old man allegedly took an improvised pair of nunchucks to Beazley's Victoria Park electoral office, that in which the man told the court that it was a ‘musical instrument’

== See also ==
- Political families of Australia

Western Australian Legislative Assembly
Preceded by Ben Wyatt	Member for Victoria Park; 2021–present	Incumbent
