= Clive Hughes (Western Australian politician) =

Australian politician

Member of the Legislative Assembly of Western Australia
- In office 17 November 1984 – 4 April 1986
- Preceded by: Don Taylor
- Succeeded by: Norm Marlborough
- Constituency: Cockburn

Personal details
- Born: 23 June 1947 Liverpool, Lancashire, England
- Died: 4 April 1986 (aged 38) Medina, Western Australia, Australia
- Party: Labor

Clive Matthew Hughes (23 June 1947 – 4 April 1986) was an Australian trade unionist and politician who was a Labor Party member of the Legislative Assembly of Western Australia from 1984 until his death, representing the seat of Cockburn.

Hughes was born in Liverpool, England, to Agnes Veronica (née Carroll) and Francis Malachy Hughes. He and his parents emigrated to Australia when he was a small child. He attended various schools, including Christian Brothers College, Fremantle, before going on to the University of Western Australia, but did not complete his degree. Working for CSBP, a chemical and fertiliser supplier, Hughes became involved with the Federated Miscellaneous Workers' Union, serving as a shop steward and later as an organiser. He was elected to the Fremantle City Council in 1980, and served until 1985. Hughes entered parliament at the 1984 Cockburn by-election, which had been caused by the resignation of Don Taylor (a former deputy premier). He was re-elected at the 1986 state election. Hughes was undergoing treatment for melanoma at the time of the election, and died of the disease less than two months later, aged 38. He had married Elizabeth Woodcock in 1977, with whom he had two children.

Parliament of Western Australia
Preceded by Don Taylor	Member for Cockburn; 1984–1986	Succeeded by Norm Marlborough
