= William Read (Australian politician) =

Australian politician

William Read MBE

Member of the Legislative Assembly of Western Australia
- In office 10 February 1945 – 14 February 1953
- Preceded by: Howard Raphael
- Succeeded by: Hugh Andrew
- Constituency: Victoria Park

Personal details
- Born: 21 July 1882 Lilydale, Victoria, Australia
- Died: 29 April 1974 (aged 91) Victoria Park, Western Australia, Australia
- Party: Independent

William Raymond Read (21 July 1882 – 29 April 1974) was an Australian politician who was an independent member of the Legislative Assembly of Western Australia from 1945 to 1953. He also served on the Perth City Council from 1926 to 1965.

== Early life ==
Read was born in Lilydale, Victoria, to Henrietta (née Raymond) and Alfred Read. He attended high school in Bendigo, and then moved to Western Australia to attend Perth Technical College, graduating as a pharmacist in 1902. Read eventually established his own pharmacy in Victoria Park. He served on the board of Karrakatta Cemetery, and was also involved with the Ugly Men's Association, a prominent charity.

== Politics and later life ==
In 1926, at the age of 44, Read was elected to the Perth City Council, representing the Victoria Park ward. He served as a councillor until his retirement in May 1965, aged 82. Read entered parliament at the 1945 Victoria Park by-election, caused by the death of Howard Raphael. He polled 56.7 percent of the two-candidate-preferred vote, defeating Labor and Liberal candidates as well as several other independents.

Read was re-elected at the 1947 state election, which resulted in a hung parliament. He and another independent, Harry Shearn, elected to support Ross McLarty as premier, allowing the formation of a Liberal government. This arrangement continued after the 1950 election (which resulted in another hung parliament), with the additional support of a third independent, David Grayden. Read did not stand for re-election in 1953. He was made a Member of the Order of the British Empire (MBE) in 1965, and died in 1974, aged 91. Read had married Florence Matilda Mills in 1903, with whom he had four children.

== See also ==
- Independent politicians in Australia

Parliament of Western Australia
| Preceded by Howard Raphael | Member for Victoria Park; 1945–1953 | Succeeded by Hugh Andrew |
