= David Scaife =

Australian politician

David Scaife MLA
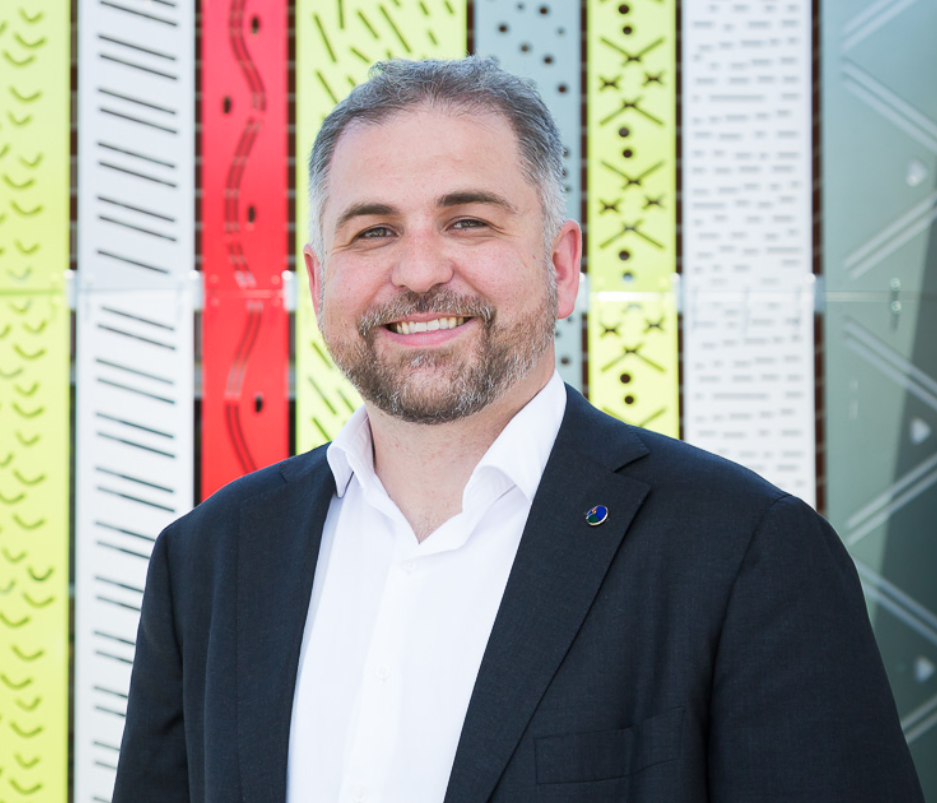

Member of the Western Australian Legislative Assembly for Cockburn
- Incumbent
- Assumed office 13 March 2021
- Preceded by: Fran Logan

Personal details
- Born: 16 December 1988 (age 37) Subiaco, Western Australia
- Party: Labor (2005 – present)
- Spouse: Ellie Whiteaker
- Education: University of Western Australia; University College London; Australian National University
- Website: www.davidscaife.com.au

David Anthony Edward Scaife (born 16 December 1988) is an Australian politician, who was elected as a Labor member for Cockburn in the Western Australian Legislative Assembly at the 2021 state election.

== Early life and education ==
Scaife was born in Subiaco, Western Australia to Roy and Catherine Scaife. He spent his childhood in Australind, attending Australind Primary School and Australind Senior High School. He was one of 23 students in 2005 to achieve a perfect Tertiary Entrance Rank score of 99.95. He studied for a Bachelor of Arts with Honours and a Bachelor of Laws at the University of Western Australia from 2006 to 2012, a Master of Laws at University College London from 2019 to 2020, and a Master of Public Policy at the Australian National University from 2021 to 2024.

== Politics ==
Scaife joined the Australian Labor Party (WA) in 2005. He joined the Australian Manufacturing Workers Union in 2008, making him part of the Labor Left faction. He worked in the office of Senator Louise Pratt from August 2008 to November 2012. After that, he worked for the Australian Manufacturing Workers' Union until March 2013. He was president of WA Young Labor in 2012.

From August 2013 to August 2016, he worked as a lawyer for Slater and Gordon Lawyers. From August 2016 until March 2017, he worked as a legal practitioner director for Eureka Lawyers.

Scaife contested the electoral district of Murray-Wellington for Labor in 2013, but lost. He later contested the electoral district of Cockburn for Labor at the 2021 state election, after its incumbent Labor member Fran Logan retired. He comfortably won the safe Labor seat, with 68.2% of the primary vote.

Scaife was re-elected in the 2025 Western Australian state election.

== Personal life ==
Scaife is married to Ellie Whiteaker, who is a Senator for Western Australia. They live in Beeliar.

Western Australian Legislative Assembly
Preceded by Fran Logan	Member for Cockburn; 2021–present	Incumbent
