= Hugh Andrew =

Australian politician

Member of the Legislative Assembly of Western Australia
- In office 14 February 1953 – 1 July 1961
- Preceded by: William Read
- Succeeded by: Ron Davies
- Constituency: Victoria Park

Personal details
- Born: 14 June 1895 Fortitude Valley, Queensland, Australia
- Died: 1 July 1961 (aged 66) Shenton Park, Western Australia, Australia
- Party: Labor

Hugh David Andrew (14 June 1895 – 1 July 1961) was an Australian politician who was a Labor Party member of the Legislative Assembly of Western Australia from 1953 until his death, representing the seat of Victoria Park.

Andrew was born in Brisbane, Queensland, to Isabella (née Hill) and David Andrew. His family moved to Western Australia when he was a child. Andrew enlisted in the Australian Imperial Force (AIF) in June 1916, and served in France. After the end of the war, he worked variously as a winemaker, storekeeper, salesman, and insurance agent. Andrew first stood for parliament at the 1950 state election, but was defeated by the sitting independent member in Victoria Park, William Read. He recontested the seat at the 1953 election, following Read's retirement, and was successful. Andrew was re-elected with large majorities at the 1956 and 1959 elections. However, he died in office in July 1961. Andrew had married Ethel Davies (née Kersten) in 1922, with whom he had one daughter.

Parliament of Western Australia
Preceded by William Read	Member for Victoria Park; 1953–1961	Succeeded by Ron Davies
