= 1945 Victoria Park state by-election =

A by-election for the seat of Victoria Park in the Legislative Assembly of Western Australia was held on 10 February 1945. It was triggered by the death of the sitting member, Howard Raphael of the Labor Party, on 9 December 1944. The election was won by an independent candidate, William Read, who finished with 56.7 percent of the two-candidate-preferred vote. Outside of Read's victory, the election was also notable as the first in Western Australia to be contested by the newly established Liberal Party.

== Background ==
Howard Raphael, a prominent dentist and member of the Perth City Council, had held Victoria Park for the Labor Party since the seat's creation at the 1930 state election. He enlisted in a dental unit of the Australian Army in 1942, but continued on as a member of parliament until his sudden death in Sydney in December 1944. After his death, the writ for the by-election was issued on 3 January 1945, with the close of nominations on 19 January. Polling day was on 10 February, with the writ returned on 23 February.

== Candidates ==
Six candidates contested the by-election:

- Joseph Cole, a shopwalker from Victoria Park, stood as an independent.
- James Collins, a builder from Mount Lawley, stood for the Liberal Party.
- Carlyle Ferguson, a journalist from South Perth, stood for the Australian All-Parties League. He was a perennial candidate at both state and federal elections.
- John MacMillan, a pharmacist from Victoria Park, stood as an Independent Labor candidate.
- Harry Martin, a tramway worker from Victoria Park, stood for the Labor Party. He was prominent in the Tramways Union, and won preselection against twelve other candidates.
- William Read, a pharmacist from Victoria Park, stood as an independent. He had served on the Perth City Council since 1926, representing the Victoria Park ward.

== Results ==
Victoria Park state by-election, 1945
Party	Candidate	Votes	%	±%
Independent	William Read	2,537	33.1	+33.1
Labor	Harry Martin	2,410	31.5	–34.7
Independent Labor	John MacMillan	1,709	22.3	+22.3
All-Parties League	Carlyle Ferguson	527	6.9	+6.9
Independent	Joseph Cole	258	3.4	+3.4
Liberal	James Collins	220	2.9	+2.9
Total formal votes		7,661	96.8	–0.6
Informal votes		253	3.2	+0.6
Turnout		7,914	82.2	–9.1
Two-candidate-preferred result
Independent	William Read	4,340	56.7	+56.7
Labor	Harry Martin	3,321	43.3	–22.9
Independent gain from Labor		Swing	+56.7	

== Aftermath ==
Read joined three other independents in the Legislative Assembly – Horace Berry, Lionel Kelly, and Harry Shearn. He was re-elected at the 1947 state election, and with Shearn supported Ross McLarty's efforts to form a minority government.

== See also ==
- List of Western Australian state by-elections
