= Don Taylor (Australian politician) =

Australian politician

The Honourable Don Taylor AM

Deputy Premier of Western Australia
- In office 30 May 1973 – 8 April 1974
- Premier: John Tonkin
- Preceded by: Herb Graham
- Succeeded by: Ray McPharlin

Member of the Western Australian Legislative Assembly
- In office 23 March 1968 – 31 August 1984
- Preceded by: Henry Curran
- Succeeded by: Clive Hughes
- Constituency: Cockburn

Administrator of Christmas Island
- In office 4 August 1986 – 24 February 1990
- Preceded by: Tom Paterson
- Succeeded by: Bill McKenzie

Personal details
- Born: 24 January 1928 Kalgoorlie, Western Australia
- Died: 26 July 2023 (aged 95) Myaree, Western Australia
- Party: Labor

Alexander Donald Taylor AM (24 January 1928 – 26 July 2023) was an Australian politician who was a Labor Party member of the Western Australian Legislative Assembly from 1968 to 1984, representing the electoral district of Cockburn. He served as a minister in the government of John Tonkin, including as deputy premier from 1973 to 1974. Taylor later served as Administrator of Christmas Island (an Australian external territory) from 1986 to 1990.

== Early life ==
Taylor was born in Kalgoorlie to Lily Irene (née Jennings) and Alexander Taylor. He was raised in Perth, attending Perth Modern School, and was a state-level basketball player in his youth. Taylor studied teaching at the University of Western Australia and Claremont Teachers College, and after graduating worked at Applecross Senior High School (1959–1960) and Perth Modern School (1961–1962). He later worked as a rural education officer with the Junior Farmers' Council.

== Politics ==
A member of the Labor Party from 1956, Taylor was elected to parliament at the 1968 state election, replacing the retiring Henry Curran in Cockburn. After the 1971 election, which saw the election of a Labor government, he was made Minister for Housing and Minister for Labour in the new ministry. Following a ministerial reshuffle in October 1971, Taylor's titles were Minister for Labour, Minister for Prices Control, and Minister for Tourism. He was additionally made Minister for Immigration in February 1973.

In May 1973, Herb Graham stepped down as deputy leader of the Labor Party, with Taylor being elected as his replacement and consequently being appointed deputy premier. He served as deputy premier until Labor's defeat at the 1974 election, a term of less than a year (the shortest term of any deputy premier in Western Australia). After the election, Taylor was replaced as Labor's deputy leader by Colin Jamieson. He remained in the shadow ministry until 1980, serving under three leaders of the opposition (John Tonkin, Colin Jamieson, and Ron Davies).

== Later life ==
Taylor retired from parliament in August 1984. He served on the Judiciary and Parliamentary Salaries Tribunal from 1984 to 1986, and then was briefly chairman of the Authority for the Intellectually Handicapped. From 1986 to 1990, Taylor served as Administrator of Christmas Island, an Australian external territory in the Indian Ocean. He was made a Member of the Order of Australia (AM) in the 1991 Australia Day Honours, for "public service and service to the Western Australia parliament". Taylor died on 26 July 2023 in Myaree, Western Australia. He was buried at Karrakatta Cemetery.

Parliament of Western Australia
Preceded by Henry Curran	Member for Cockburn; 1968–1984	Succeeded by Clive Hughes
Political offices
Preceded by Herb Graham	Deputy Premier; 1973–1974	Succeeded by Ray McPharlin
Preceded by Des O'Neil	Minister for Housing; 1971	Succeeded by Arthur Bickerton
Preceded by Des O'Neil	Minister for Labour; 1971–1973	Succeeded by John Harman
Preceded by Ron Davies	Minister for Prices Control; 1971–1973	Succeeded by John Harman
Preceded by Ron Davies	Minister for Consumer Protection; 1971–1973	Succeeded by John Harman
Preceded by Tom Evans	Minister for Tourism; 1971–1973	Succeeded by Ronald Thompson
Preceded by Arthur Griffith	Minister for Immigration; 1973	Succeeded by John Harman
Preceded by Herb Graham	Minister for Development and Decentralisation; 1973–1974	Succeeded by Charles Court
