= Bill Thomas (Australian politician) =

Australian politician

William Ian Thomas

Member of the Western Australian Legislative Assembly
- In office 1986–2001
- Constituency: Cockburn

Personal details
- Born: 18 September 1950 (age 76) Perth, Western Australia, Australia
- Party: Australian Labor Party
- Occupation: Politician, union official

William Ian Thomas (born 18 September 1950) is a former Australian politician.

He was born in Perth and was a union official and ministerial officer before entering politics. In 1986 he was elected to the Western Australian Legislative Assembly as the Labor member for Welshpool, moving to Cockburn in 1989. From 1986 to 1989 he was Deputy Government Whip, and from 1989 to 1992 he was Parliamentary Secretary to the Cabinet. Following Labor's defeat in 1993 he was promoted to the front bench as Shadow Minister for Water Resources, Science and Technology and Energy, but he stepped down from the front bench in 1999 and retired from politics in 2001.

Western Australian Legislative Assembly
Preceded by Colin Jamieson	Member for Welshpool; 1986–1989	Abolished
Preceded by Norm Marlborough	Member for Cockburn; 1989–2001	Succeeded by Fran Logan
