= Electoral district of Peel =

Former state electoral district of Western Australia

Peel Western Australia—Legislative Assembly
- State: Western Australia
- Dates current: 1989–2008
- Namesake: Peel region

Peel was an electoral district of the Legislative Assembly in the Australian state of Western Australia from 1989 to 2008.

The district was based in the south-western suburbs of Perth.

Peel was at all times a safe Labor seat.

== History ==
Peel was first created for the 1989 state election. It was won by Labor candidate Norm Marlborough, who retained the seat at all subsequent elections.

=== 2007 by-election ===
Marlborough resigned in late 2006 amidst a corruption scandal. The resulting by-election saw Labor candidate Paul Papalia elected as the district's new member. Papalia represented the seat until its abolition ahead of the 2008 state election.

At the redistribution that resulted in its abolition, Peel was divided between two new seats: Warnbro, which comprised the southern three quarters of the electorate, and Kwinana, which was created from the northern quarter of Peel, plus parts of neighbouring districts. At the 2008 election, Papalia became the member for Warnbro.

== Geography ==
Peel was a north–south elongated electorate based in the outer south-western suburbs of Perth. It surrounded, but never included, the satellite community of Rockingham. In its original form, Peel ran from the suburbs to the north-east of Rockingham down to suburbs to the south-east of Rockingham. However, due to the district lying in a high growth area, successive redistribution saw areas shed at its northern end. In its final form, the district went no further north than to Rockingham's immediate east.

== Members for Peel ==
Member	Party	Term
Norm Marlborough	Labor	1989–2007
Paul Papalia	Labor	2007–2008
