= Fran Logan =

Australian politician

The Honourable Fran Logan OAM
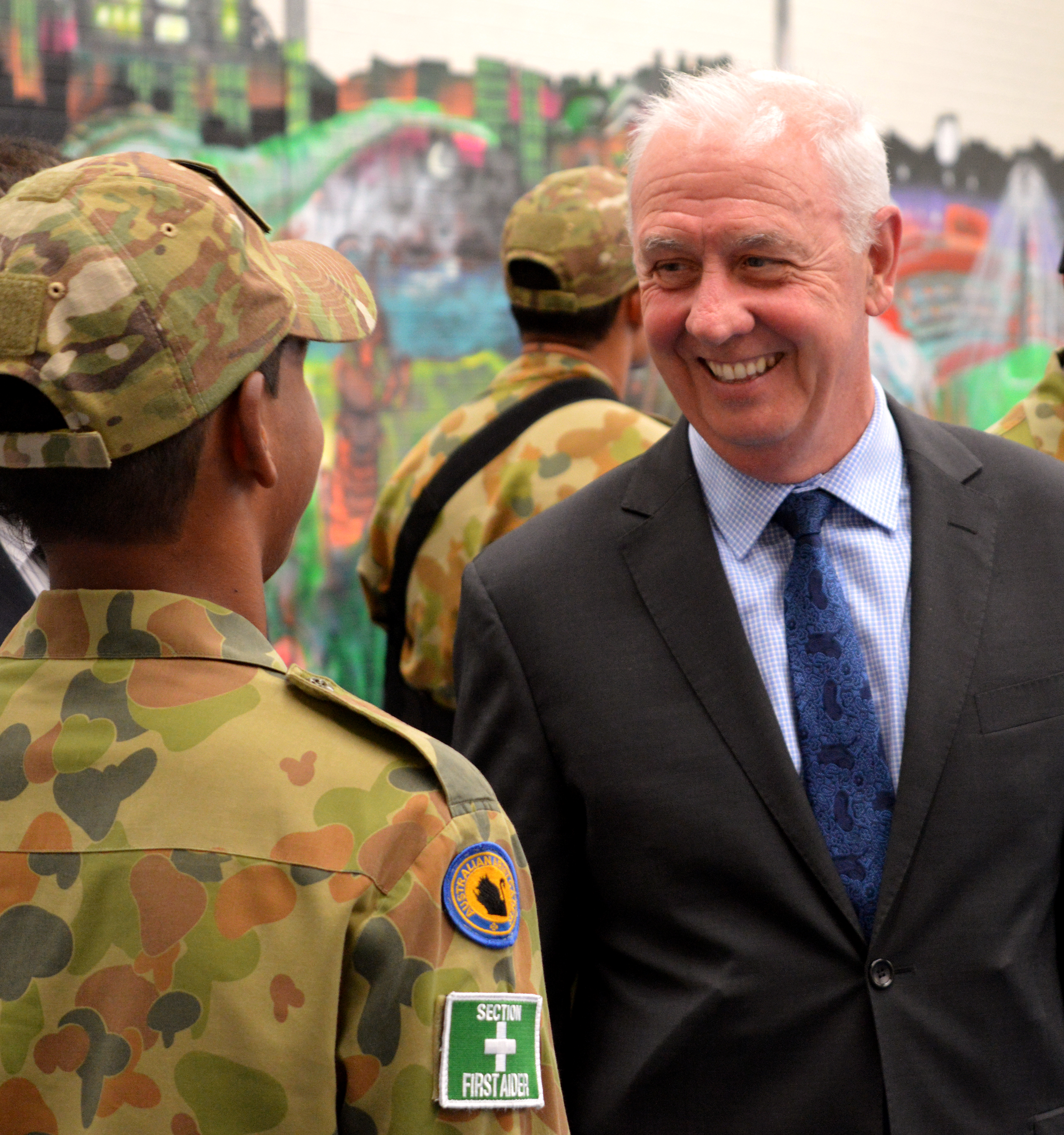
- Logan at an army cadet graduation at Banksia Hill Detention Centre in 2017

Member of the Western Australian Legislative Assembly for Cockburn
- In office 10 February 2001 – 13 March 2021
- Preceded by: Bill Thomas
- Succeeded by: David Scaife

Personal details
- Born: Francis Michael Logan; 23 March 1956 (age 70) Whyteleafe, Surrey, England
- Citizenship: Australian
- Party: Labor Party
- Spouse: Vivienne Burnham
- Children: Two
- Education: University of Sydney
- Occupation: Mechanic, union official

Francis Michael Logan (born 25 February 1956) is a former politician in Western Australia, who was the Minister for Emergency Services and Corrective Services in the McGowan Labor Government from 2017 to 2021.

He was elected to the south western electorate of Cockburn for the Labor Party in 2001, and retired from the Legislative Assembly in 2021.

== Biography ==
Logan trained as a mechanic in his native England before emigrating to Western Australia in 1980 after travelling around Asia.

He worked in the aircraft and mining industries in New South Wales and Western Australia and later completed a Bachelor of Arts with Honours in History at Sydney University where he won the Committee for the Economic Development of Australia National Award for his thesis examining Australia's trade relations with Japan and China.

Logan was employed as a trade research officer, industrial advocate and organiser with the Australian Manufacturing Workers Union from 1986 until entering parliament in 2001.

He was awarded the Medal of the Order of Australia in the 2026 King's Birthday Honours for "service to the people and Parliament of Western Australia".

He is married to wife Vivienne and has two adult children Alexandra and Henry.

== Political career ==
Under Logan's tenure as the current minister for emergency services and corrective services, the Department of Fire and Emergency Services was restructured to include a Rural Fire Division and the Office of Emergency Management was integrated into the department's structure.

A new Bushfire Centre of Excellence was also planned, to research bushfire management and response.

The Department of Corrective Services was merged with the previous Department of the Attorney-General to become the Department of Justice.

Logan won preselection for the seat of Cockburn on the retirement of Bill Thomas. Logan won the seat at the 2001 election, subsequently retaining it at both the 2005 and 2008 elections.

Early in his time in office, he was appointed Parliamentary Secretary to the Minister for the Environment. Following the 2005 election, he was promoted to the Ministry on 10 March 2005, becoming the Minister of Housing and Works and Minister for Heritage, as well as the Minister assisting the Minister for Planning and Infrastructure Alannah MacTiernan.

On 3 February 2006, Logan was appointed Minister for Energy, Science and Innovation in the Carpenter Ministry. Following a reshuffle of the Ministry on 13 December 2006, he gained the Resources portfolio as well as Industry and Enterprise, whilst losing Science and Innovation to Alan Carpenter. Logan served in the Carpenter Ministry as Minister for Energy; Resources; Industry and Enterprise until the Labor government's defeat at the 2008 election.

In May 2008, allegations surfaced that Logan had discussed with one of his female ministerial staffers about having sex with him and another employee of the government. Logan claimed he was joking with a staffer that he had known for some years and it was part of an "ongoing, light-hearted, two-way banter".

He said that the woman involved did not express any offence or concern at the time. However, the former ministerial staffed claimed that Logan had made the comment on more than one occasion and she had found the remarks completely inappropriate, offensive and not fitting of a minister of the Crown.

Then premier Alan Carpenter ignored Opposition calls to remove Logan over the allegations after Logan claimed it was a joke.

Following Labor's loss at the 2008 state election, he formally ceased his duties as a Minister on 23 September 2008, and became the Shadow Minister for Water, Consumer Protection and Industrial Relations.

He became the minister for emergency services and corrective services on 17 March 2017 following the McGowan Labor Government's defeat of the Barnett Liberal-National Government at the 11 March 2017 election.

Parliament of Western Australia
Preceded by Bill Thomas	Member for Cockburn; 2001–2021	Succeeded by David Scaife
Preceded by Eric Ripper	Minister for Energy; 2006–2008	Not filled
Preceded by Nick Griffiths	Minister for Housing and Works; 2005–2006	Succeeded by Michelle Roberts
