= Howard Raphael =

Australian politician

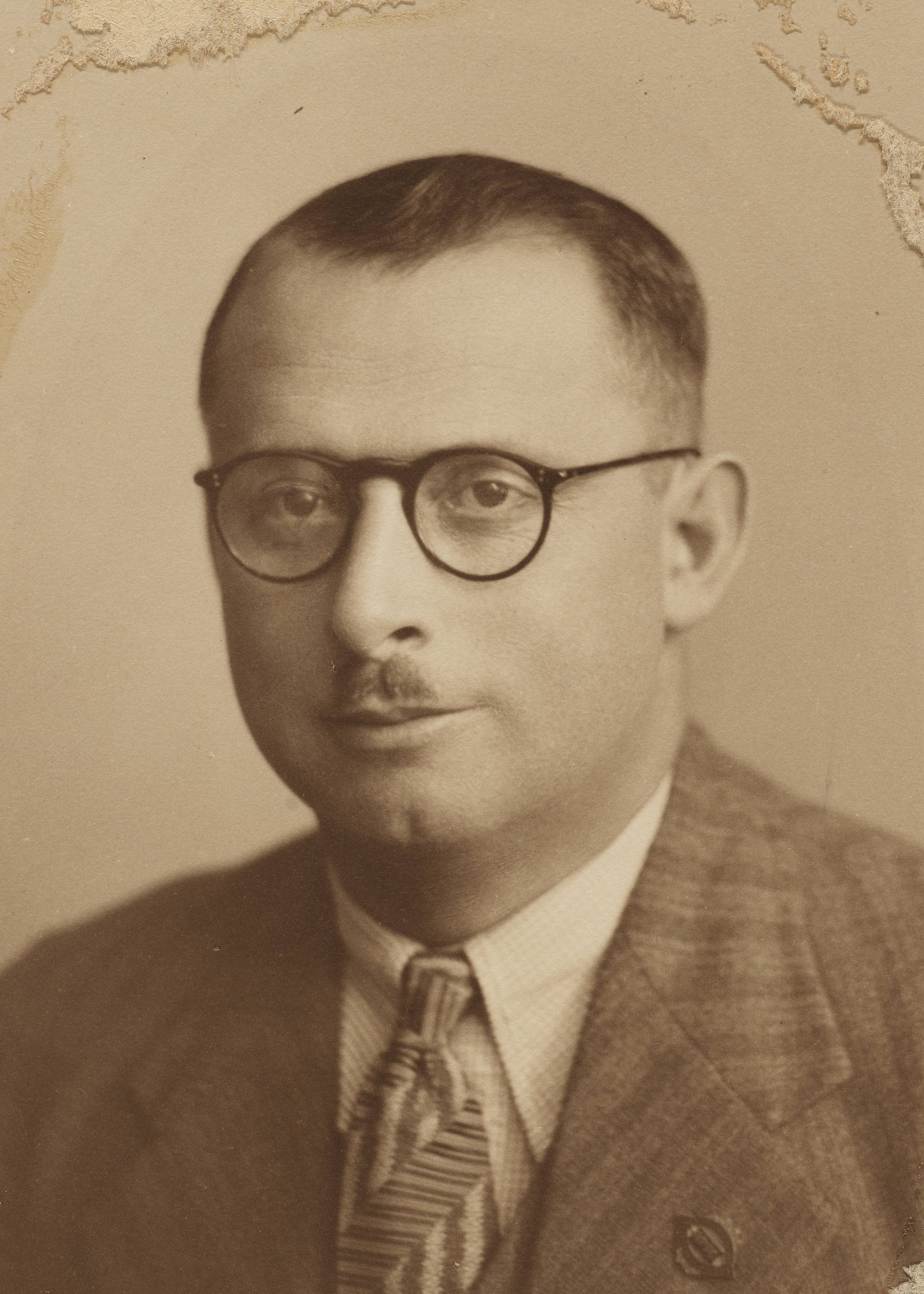
- Raphael c. 1944

Member of the Legislative Assembly of Western Australia
- In office 12 April 1930 – 9 December 1944
- Preceded by: None (new seat)
- Succeeded by: William Read
- Constituency: Victoria Park

Personal details
- Born: 13 June 1900 Adelaide, South Australia, Australia
- Died: 9 December 1944 (aged 44) Manly, New South Wales, Australia
- Party: Labor

Howard Stirling "Mick" Raphael (13 June 1900 – 9 December 1944) was an Australian politician who was a Labor Party member of the Legislative Assembly of Western Australia from 1930 until his death, representing the seat of Victoria Park. Outside of politics, his profession was dentistry.

Raphael was born in Adelaide, South Australia, to Zara Jane (née Tuxford) and Joseph George Raphael. His great-uncle, William Wedd Tuxford, had been an MP in South Australia. Raphael spent his early childhood in Adelaide, attending Pulteney Grammar School, and later moved to Perth, attending the Perth Boys School and St Patrick's Boys' School. He began working as a dental assistant after leaving school, and eventually became a dental surgeon. Raphael was elected to the Perth City Council in 1924, and would hold a seat on the council for the rest of his life. He had a prominent position as chairman of the council's electricity and gas committee.

At the 1930 state election, Raphael was elected to the newly created seat of Victoria Park. He was re-elected at four more state elections, on each occasion with larger majorities. In October 1942, Raphael enlisted in a dental unit of the Australian Army, and was given the rank of captain. He died suddenly in December 1944 (aged 44), while stationed in Sydney. Raphael had been married twice, firstly to Vera Punston in 1925, with whom he had one son. He was widowed in 1932, and remarried in 1935 to Mary Stubbs, although he had no further children.

Parliament of Western Australia
New seat	Member for Victoria Park; 1930–1944	Succeeded by William Read
