= Electoral district of Victoria Park =

State electoral district in Perth, Western Australia

Victoria Park Western Australia—Legislative Assembly
- Interactive map of electoral district boundaries from the 2025 state election
- State: Western Australia
- Dates current: 1930–present
- MP: Hannah Beazley
- Party: Labor
- Namesake: Victoria Park
- Electors: 30,734 (2025)
- Area: 25 km^{2} (9.7 sq mi)
- Demographic: Metropolitan
- Coordinates: 31.99°S 115.91°E
Electorates around Victoria Park:
Mount Lawley; Perth	Maylands	Belmont
South Perth	Victoria Park	Belmont
Riverton	Cannington	Cannington

The Electoral district of Victoria Park is a Legislative Assembly electorate in the state of Western Australia. Victoria Park is named for the inner southeastern Perth suburb of Victoria Park, which falls within its borders.

== History ==
Victoria Park was created at the 1929 redistribution, at which five new metropolitan electorates were created to replace former Goldfields seats in Parliament. The seat is considered a safe Labor Party seat, and has been held by the party for all but eight years since its creation. William Read, who won the 1945 by-election and remained in parliament until the 1953 state election, is the only non-Labor candidate to have held the seat. From 1961 to 1986 Victoria Park was held by Ron Davies, who was opposition leader from 1978 until 1981. Davies left parliament in 1986 after his appointment as Agent-General for Western Australia in London, and at the resulting by-election, held on 7 June 1986, Geoff Gallop, a lecturer at Murdoch University, was elected. In 1996, he followed his predecessor into the role of opposition leader, and just over four years later, became premier after Labor's victory at the 2001 election. He retired from politics and as premier on 16 January 2006 to aid his recovery from depression, saying that "in the interests of my health and my family, I've decided to rethink my career." Labor's Ben Wyatt won the resulting by-election, with a 5% swing to the opposition Liberal candidate.

Of the five times the seat has changed members, four of them have occurred at by-elections (all except Hugh Andrew's win at the 1953 election), two of which have been caused by the death of the incumbent in office (Howard Raphael and Hugh Andrew). No incumbent member has ever been defeated.

== Geography ==
Victoria Park is bounded by the Swan River to the north, Orrong Road to the northeast, Mills and Burton Streets to the southeast, Manning Road to the south, and Kent Street, Banksia Terrace and Hurlingham Road to the west. It includes the suburbs of Bentley, Burswood, Carlisle, East Victoria Park, Lathlain, St James, Victoria Park and parts of Kensington and Welshpool.

In the 2007 redistribution, the seat lost Cannington, Queens Park, Wilson and parts of Welshpool, while gaining parts of Kensington and all sections of East Victoria Park west of Berwick Street and Hill View Terrace which had been allocated to South Perth in the previous redistribution.

== Members for Victoria Park ==
Member	Party	Term
Howard Raphael	Labor	1930–1944
William Read	Independent	1945–1953
Hugh Andrew	Labor	1953–1961
Ron Davies	Labor	1961–1986
Geoff Gallop	Labor	1986–2006
Ben Wyatt	Labor	2006–2021
Hannah Beazley	Labor	2021–present

== Election results ==
2025 Western Australian state election: Victoria Park
Party	Candidate	Votes	%	±%
Labor	Hannah Beazley	11,323	45.7	−18.0
Liberal	Andra Biondi	6,512	26.3	+9.8
Greens	Jack Gordon-Manley	5,113	20.6	+8.1
Christians	Linda Watson	1,116	4.5	+2.2
Animal Justice	Roberta Vlaar	738	3.0	+3.0
Total formal votes		24,802	96.4	−0.3
Informal votes		924	3.6	+0.3
Turnout		25,726	83.7	+3.4
Two-party-preferred result
Labor	Hannah Beazley	16,550	66.7	−10.9
Liberal	Andra Biondi	8,249	33.3	+10.9
Labor hold		Swing	−10.9	
