= 2007 Peel state by-election =

By-election in Western Australia

- 3 February 2007

Electoral district of Peel in the Western Australian Legislative Assembly
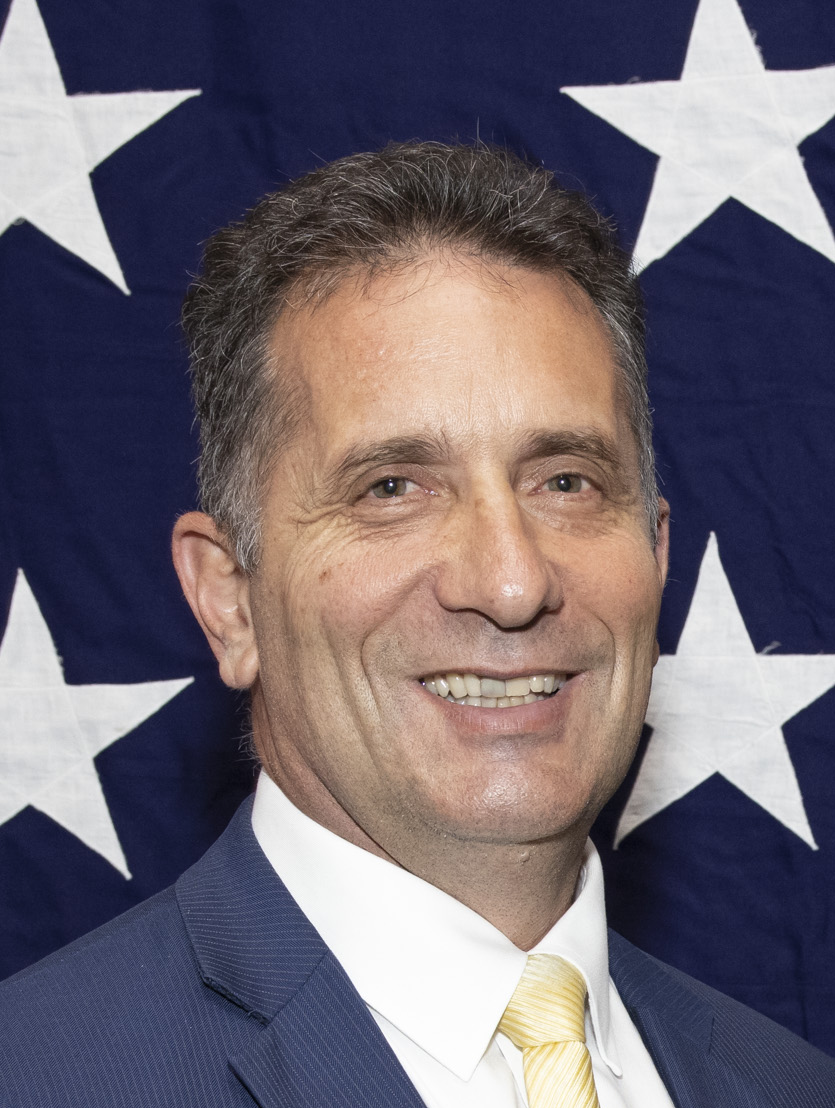

	First party	Second party
Candidate	Paul Papalia	Greame Coleman
Party	Labor	Liberal
Popular vote	10,801	5179
Percentage	50.48%	24.21%
	Third party	Fourth party
		IND
Candidate	Dawn Jecks	Gerard Kettle
Party	Greens	Independent
Popular vote	1,941	1,062
Percentage	9.07%	4.96%
Member before election
Norm Marlborough
Labor
Elected Member
Paul Papalia
Labor

The 2007 Peel state by-election was held in the Western Australian Legislative Assembly district of Peel on 3 February 2007. The by-election was triggered by the resignation of Labor MP Norm Marlborough. Labor candidate Paul Papalia was elected to fill the vacancy.

== Background ==
Norm Marlborough was appointed to cabinet in 2006 as Minister for Small Business, Minister for the Peel and the South West, and Minister Assisting the Minister for Education and Training. This followed the replacement of Geoff Gallop by Alan Carpenter as Premier and Labor leader. Carpenter relaxed the previously existing ban on ministerial contact with disgraced former Premier turned lobbyist Brian Burke. Marlborough, a friend of Burke's, would prove an embarrassment to the government when it was revealed by the Corruption and Crime Commission that he had deliberately passed on confidential cabinet information to Burke.

Marlborough resigned from parliament on 10 November 2006, following his sacking from the ministry. On 21 November 2006, the Speaker of the Western Australian Legislative Assembly issued a writ directing the Electoral Commissioner to proceed with an election in the district.

== Timeline ==
Date	Event
10 November 2006	Norm Marlborough resigned, vacating the seat of Peel.
21 November 2006	Writs were issued by the Speaker of the Legislative Assembly to proceed with a by-election.
4 January 2007	Close of nominations and draw of ballot papers.
3 February 2007	Polling day, between the hours of 8am and 6pm.
19 February 2007	The writ was returned and the results formally declared.

== Results ==
Despite the controversy surrounding Marlborough's resignation, the government went unpunished at the ballot box. Instead, the by-election produced an increased two-party preferred majority for Labor.

Peel state by-election, 2007
Party	Candidate	Votes	%	±%
Labor	Paul Papalia	10,801	50.48	−4.50
Liberal	Graeme Coleman	5,179	24.21	−4.81
Greens	Dawn Jecks	1,941	9.07	+2.70
Independent	Gerard Kettle	1,062	4.96	+4.96
One Nation	Craig Bradshaw	913	4.27	+2.08
Christian Democrats	Brent Tremain	871	4.07	+0.31
Independent	Robert Woodward	461	2.15	+2.15
Citizens Electoral Council	Brian McCarthy	168	0.79	+0.40
Total formal votes		21,396	96.39	+1.57
Informal votes		801	3.61	−1.57
Turnout		22,197	79.54	−10.28
Two-party-preferred result
Labor	Paul Papalia	13,811	64.59	+1.09
Liberal	Graeme Coleman	7,570	35.41	−1.09
Labor hold		Swing	+1.09	
