= Ben Wyatt (politician) =

Australian politician

The Honourable Ben Wyatt AO

Treasurer of Western Australia
- In office 17 March 2017 – 18 March 2021
- Premier: Mark McGowan
- Preceded by: Mike Nahan
- Succeeded by: Mark McGowan

Member of the Legislative Assembly for Victoria Park
- In office 11 March 2006 – 13 March 2021
- Preceded by: Geoff Gallop
- Succeeded by: Hannah Beazley

Personal details
- Born: Benjamin Sana Wyatt; 1 April 1974 (age 52) Wewak, Papua New Guinea
- Citizenship: Australian
- Party: Labor Party
- Spouse: Vivianne Wyatt
- Relations: Cedric Wyatt (father); Ken Wyatt (second cousin)
- Children: 2
- Education: Aquinas College, University of Western Australia, Royal Military College, London School of Economics
- Profession: Lawyer

Benjamin Sana Wyatt (born 1 April 1974) is an Australian politician who was the Labor Party member for the seat of Victoria Park in the Legislative Assembly of Western Australia from 2006 to 2021.

Born in Wewak, Papua New Guinea, to Australian parents, Wyatt moved to Western Australia at an early age. He was elected to parliament in 2006, at the Victoria Park by-election, replacing Geoff Gallop, a former premier. While he was the state's Aboriginal Affairs Minister, his federal counterpart the Indigenous Australians Minister, was his second cousin Ken Wyatt.

== Early life and education ==
Wyatt was born in Wewak, a town on the northern coast of what was then the Territory of Papua New Guinea. His parents were both school-teachers on an exchange program—his father, Cedric Wyatt, was originally from the Pilbara, and his mother was originally from Newcastle, New South Wales. Wyatt has Yamatji heritage through his father.

His family returned to Perth, Western Australia, in 1976. Wyatt grew up in regional Western Australia, with his parents teaching in various locations in the Goldfields, including Laverton and Kalgoorlie. He returned to Perth to attend high school at Aquinas College, and later studied at the University of Western Australia, graduating with a Bachelor of Laws degree.

He attended the Royal Military College, Duntroon, graduating as an Australian Army Reserve officer in 1996, and later received the Australian Defence Medal. After working in law firms in Perth and Sydney, Wyatt received an ambassadorial scholarship in 2001 from the Rotary Foundation, allowing him to study comparative politics at the London School of Economics.

== Career ==
=== Law ===
After returning to Western Australia in 2002, Wyatt began working at MinterEllison, one of the "Big Six" law firms in Australia. He later worked at the Office of the Director of Public Prosecutions.

=== Politics ===
Wyatt ran for state parliament at the 2006 Victoria Park by-election, triggered by the resignation of Geoff Gallop, the Premier of Western Australia at the time. Wyatt won the seat with 49.38% of the direct vote and 61.18% of the two-party vote – a swing of 7.93 and 4.86 points, respectively, against the Labor Party, becoming the second-youngest sitting parliamentarian and the third Aboriginal Australian in parliament. After Labor's defeat in the 2008 state election, Wyatt was promoted to the role of treasurer in the new shadow cabinet as well as Shadow Minister for Federal–State Relations and Shadow Minister for Culture and the Arts.

In January 2011, Wyatt intended to challenge Eric Ripper as Leader of the Opposition and of the Australian Labor Party in Western Australia, but withdrew after finding little support amongst caucus members. Ripper resigned from the position in January 2012, but Wyatt did not contest the leadership, with Mark McGowan being elected unopposed as Leader of the Opposition.

After the 2017 election, Ben Wyatt became the first Indigenous treasurer for any Australian state or territory.

On 25 February 2020, Ben Wyatt announced his intention to retire from parliament at the next election in 2021. He would continue in his role as treasurer until then. However, in March 2020, Wyatt reversed his decision to quit and announced he would stay on to assist the McGowan government in the state's economic recovery from the COVID-19 pandemic in Australia. In November 2020, he again announced his intention to retire at the March 2021 state election.

Wyatt was appointed an Officer of the Order of Australia in the 2026 King's Birthday Honours in recognition of his "distinguished service to the people and Parliament of Western Australia, to the Indigenous community, to corporate governance, and to the not-for-profit sector".

=== Career with Mining Companies ===
In 2021 Ben Wyatt joined the board of Woodside, and also became a non-executive director of Rio Tinto

== Personal life ==
Wyatt is a Roman Catholic and has two daughters.

His second cousin is Ken Wyatt, who was the first member of the Australian House of Representatives of Aboriginal Australian descent.

== List of portfolios ==
In the period from his election in 2006 to his resignation in 2021, Wyatt held the following portfolios:

- 26 September 2008 – 8 April 2009: Shadow Treasurer; Shadow Minister for Federal–State Relations; Shadow Minister for Culture and the Arts
- 8 April 2009 – 27 January 2012: Shadow Treasurer; Shadow Minister for Federal–State Relations
- 27 January 2012 – 9 April 2013: Shadow Treasurer; Shadow Minister for Indigenous Affairs; Shadow Minister for Native Title; Shadow Minister for Cost of Living
- 9 April 2013 – 17 March 2017: Shadow Treasurer; Shadow Minister for Aboriginal Affairs; Shadow Minister for Native Title; Shadow Minister for Cost of Living; Shadow Minister for the Kimberley; Shadow Minister for the Pilbara
- 17 March 2017 – 13 December 2018: Treasurer; Minister for Finance; Minister for Energy; Minister for Aboriginal Affairs
- 13 December 2018 – 13 March 2021: Treasurer; Minister for Finance; Minister for Aboriginal Affairs; Minister for Lands

== See also ==
- Political families of Australia

Western Australian Legislative Assembly
Preceded by Geoff Gallop	Member for Victoria Park; 2006–2021	Succeeded by Hannah Beazley
Political offices
Preceded by Mike Nahan	Treasurer of Western Australia; 2017–2021	Succeeded by Mark McGowan
Preceded by Mike Nahan	Minister for Energy; 2017–2021	Succeeded by Bill Johnston
Preceded by Sean L'Estrange	Minister for Finance; 2017–2021	Succeeded by Tony Buti
Preceded by Peter Collier	Minister for Aboriginal Affairs; 2017–2021	Succeeded by Stephen Dawson
