= Electoral district of Cockburn =

State electoral district of Western Australia

Cockburn Western Australia—Legislative Assembly
- Interactive map of electoral district boundaries from the 2025 state election
- State: Western Australia
- Dates current: 1962–present
- MP: David Scaife
- Party: Labor
- Namesake: City of Cockburn
- Electors: 32,794 (2025)
- Area: 65 km^{2} (25.1 sq mi)
- Demographic: Metropolitan
- Coordinates: 32.13°S 115.81°E
Electorates around Cockburn:
Fremantle	Bibra Lake	Jandakot
Indian Ocean	Cockburn	Jandakot
Indian Ocean	Kwinana	Oakford

Cockburn is an electoral district of the Legislative Assembly in the Australian state of Western Australia.

The district is based in Perth's south-western suburbs. Politically, it is a safe Labor seat.

== Geography ==
Cockburn is located in the south-western suburbs of Perth. It is a coastal electorate, lying to the west of the Kwinana Freeway. The district includes the suburbs of Cockburn Central, Atwell, Yangebup, Munster, Beeliar, Success, most of Coogee and Lake Coogee

== History ==
Cockburn was first contested at the 1962 state election. The seat's first member was Henry Curran, who had previously been the member for South Fremantle.

Cockburn has been at all times held by the Labor Party.

== Members for Cockburn ==
Member	Party	Term
Henry Curran	Labor	1962–1968
Don Taylor	Labor	1968–1984
Clive Hughes	Labor	1984–1986
Norm Marlborough	Labor	1986–1989
Bill Thomas	Labor	1989–2001
Fran Logan	Labor	2001–2021
David Scaife	Labor	2021–present

== Election results ==
2025 Western Australian state election: Cockburn
Party	Candidate	Votes	%	±%
Labor	David Scaife	14,219	52.2	−17.7
Liberal	Brunetta Di Russo	6,750	24.8	+7.2
Greens	Brendan Graham Sturcke	3,282	12.0	+5.9
Legalise Cannabis	Christopher Rennick	1,577	5.8	+5.8
Christians	Gopi Veloo	1,424	5.2	+5.2
Total formal votes		27,252	95.0	−1.2
Informal votes		1,422	5.0	+1.2
Turnout		28,674	87.4	+6.7
Two-party-preferred result
Labor	David Scaife	18,479	67.8	−10.2
Liberal	Brunetta Di Russo	8,764	32.2	+10.2
Labor hold		Swing	−10.2	
