= 2006 Victoria Park state by-election =

The 2006 Victoria Park state by-election was a by-election held on 11 March 2006 for the Western Australian Legislative Assembly seat of Victoria Park in the inner southeastern suburbs of Perth.

== Background ==
The by-election was triggered by the resignation of Labor member Geoff Gallop on 16 January 2006. Gallop had represented the area since a by-election on 7 June 1986, and had served as a minister, shadow minister, Opposition Leader (1996–2001) and Premier of Western Australia since 2001. Gallop announced his resignation as Premier and from Parliament in order to aid his recovery from depression, and that "in the interests of my health and my family, I've decided to rethink my career."

The Speaker of the Legislative Assembly advised Parliament on 7 March 2006 that he had received a letter from Gallop on 25 January announcing his resignation as the member for Victoria Park, and announced that under section 67(2) of the Electoral Act 1907, he had on 2 February 2006 directed the Acting Electoral Commissioner to proceed with an election in the district. The battle for Labor party preselection was hard-fought, with 31-year-old DPP lawyer Ben Wyatt defeating former national president of the Liquor Hospitality and Miscellaneous Workers' Union, Helen Creed, at a vote on 1 February 2006 of the 14-member Administrative Committee. The by-election, called for 11 March 2006, attracted a total of eleven candidates, one of the largest in Western Australian electoral history.

The seat of Victoria Park, which elects a single member to the Western Australian Legislative Assembly using a preferential method, was established in 1929 by the Government of Western Australia under the Redistribution of Seats Act (No 1 of 1929), which was given assent by the Governor on 15 April 1929. The seat is considered a safe Labor Party seat, and has been held by the party between 1930 and 1945, and since the 1953 state election.

== Timeline ==
Date	Event
16 January 2006	Geoff Gallop resigned, vacating the seat of Victoria Park.
2 February 2006	Writs were issued by the Speaker of the Legislative Assembly to proceed with a by-election.
17 February 2006	Close of nominations and draw of ballot papers.
11 March 2006	Polling day, between the hours of 8am and 6pm.
24 March 2006	The writ was returned and the results formally declared.

== Candidates ==
The by-election attracted eleven candidates, significantly more than the previous Victoria Park election, which attracted only five candidates. Both major parties fielded a candidate, with the Greens, One Nation, Daylight Saving Party, Family First and the Christian Democrats, as well as three independents. In addition, John Tattersall contested without a party label on the ballot representing Socialist Alliance, which was not a registered party at the time.

One Nation candidate Sue Bateman made national headlines when it emerged that she was running for the seat of Victoria Park. The former One Nation president was accused of being a prolific online racist, using the forum Stormfront. She was also dismissive of Gallop's battle with depression, saying that average Joe did not have the luxury of becoming depressed.

== Results ==
As largely predicted, Ben Wyatt retained the seat for the Labor party, with a swing against him of 4.86%. Wyatt claimed victory within two hours and became one of three Aboriginal parliamentarians in Western Australia.

Voter turnout was low, given that Victoria Park is a safe Labor seat, with only 64% of voters casting their vote: the lowest for a by-election in the state since 1936.

Victoria Park state by-election, 2006
Party	Candidate	Votes	%	±%
Labor	Ben Wyatt	7,786	49.38	−7.93
Liberal	Bruce Stevenson	4,887	30.99	+3.24
Greens	Dee Margetts	1,328	8.42	−0.25
Christian Democrats	Bill Heggers	551	3.49	−0.13
One Nation	Sue Bateman	436	2.76	+0.10
Independent	Andrew Owens	217	1.38	+1.38
Daylight Savings	James Dunn	156	0.99	+0.99
Family First	Peter Greaves	151	0.96	+0.96
Socialist Alliance	John Tattersall	131	0.83	+0.83
Independent	Mike Ward	83	0.53	+0.53
Independent	Teresa van Lieshout	43	0.27	+0.27
Total formal votes		15,769	96.26	+1.58
Informal votes		612	3.74	−1.58
Turnout		16,381	64.04	−23.62
Two-party-preferred result
Labor	Ben Wyatt	9,632	61.18	−4.86
Liberal	Bruce Stevenson	6,111	38.82	+4.86
Labor hold		Swing	−4.86	
