= Paul Papalia =

Australian politician (born 1962)

The Honourable Paul Papalia CSC
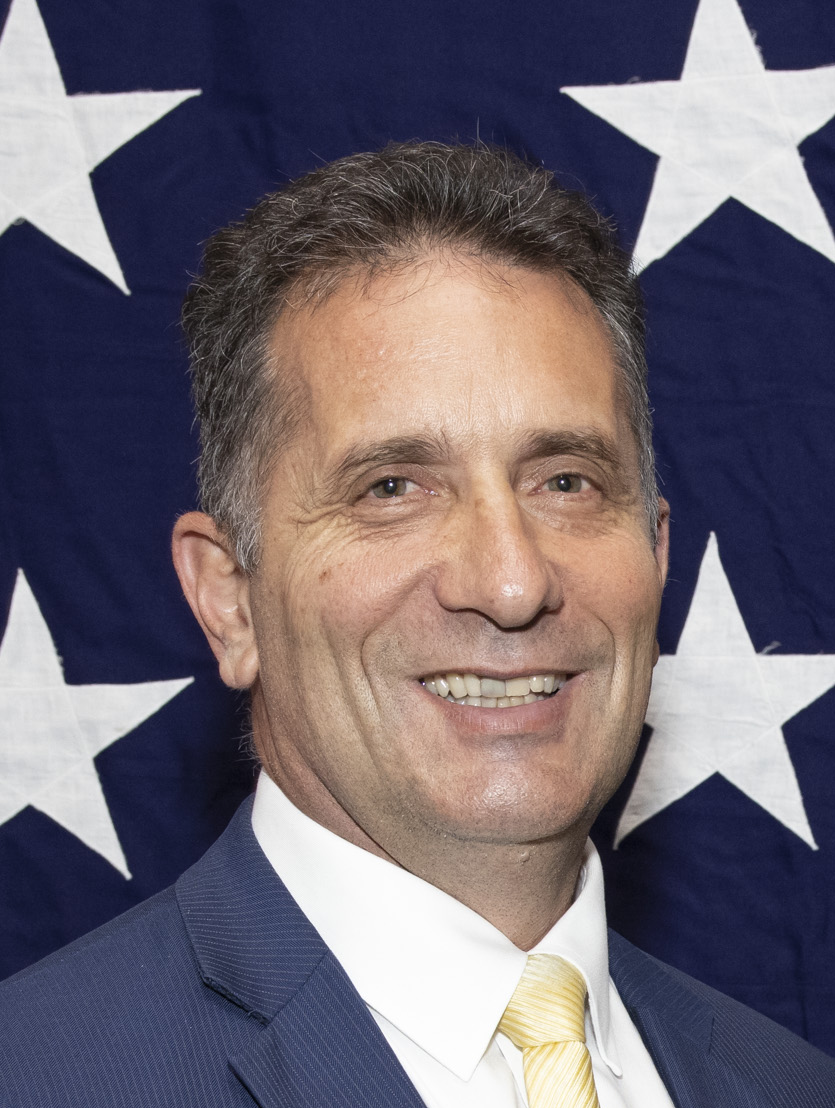
- Papalia in 2021

Minister for Emergency Services, Corrective Services, Racing and Gaming, Defence Industries and Veterans
- In office 19 March 2025 – 10 July 2026
- Preceded by: Stephen Dawson (Previously Emergency Services)

Minister for Police, Corrective Services, Racing and Gaming, Defence Industry and Veterans Issues
- In office 8 December 2023 – 19 March 2025
- Preceded by: Reece Whitby (previously Racing and Gaming)

Minister for Police, Corrective Services, Road Safety, Defence Industries and Veterans Issues
- In office 8 June 2023 – 8 December 2023
- Preceded by: Bill Johnston (Previously Corrective Services)

Minister for Police, Road Safety, Defence Industry and Veterans Issues
- In office 19 March 2021 – 8 June 2023
- Preceded by: Michelle Roberts (previously Police)

Minister for Tourism, Racing and Gaming, Small Business, Defence Issues, Citizenship and Multicultural Interests
- In office 17 March 2017 – 19 March 2021
- Preceded by: Colin Barnett (previously Tourism)

Member of the Western Australian Legislative Assembly
- In office 3 February 2007 – 10 July 2026
- Preceded by: Norm Marlborough
- Succeeded by: Luke Herdegen
- Constituency: Peel (2007–2008); Warnbro (2008–2025); Secret Harbour (2025–2026)

Personal details
- Born: 12 July 1962 (age 64) Bunbury, Western Australia
- Party: Labor
- Occupation: Navy clearance diver
- Website: www.paulpapalia.com.au

Military service
- Allegiance: Australia
- Branch/service: Royal Australian Navy
- Years of service: 1978–2004
- Rank: Lieutenant Commander
- Battles/wars: Iraq (UNSCOM); Iraq War
- Awards: Conspicuous Service Cross

Paul Papalia CSC (born 12 July 1962) is an Australian retired politician. He served as a Labor Party member of the Western Australian Legislative Assembly from February 2007 until his retirement in July 2026. He most recently served as the member for Secret Harbour having previously served as member for Peel and Warnbro before their abolition. A decorated former navy diver who served two tours in Iraq, Papalia entered parliament after winning a by-election sparked by the resignation of scandal-tarred former minister Norm Marlborough.

== Early life and naval career ==
Papalia was born in Bunbury, Western Australia and grew up in the nearby small town of Burekup. He served in the Royal Australian Navy for 26 years before entering politics, working as a navy diver and rising to the rank of lieutenant commander. He specialised in explosives retrieval and escape and rescue. Papalia completed Special Air Service Regiment (SASR) selection and reinforcement training in 1988. He then served in 3 SASR Squadron in 1989 and 1 SASR Squadron in 1990 before returning to the Navy in 1991. In 1992 he served with the United Nations Special Commission on Iraq to work as explosives disposal specialist, and was awarded the Conspicuous Service Cross in 1994 for his work there. Papalia later returned to Iraq during the Iraq War, serving as executive officer in an Australian mine-clearing team. He left the navy in 2004, and operated a small business renovating houses up until the time of his election to parliament.

== Political career ==
In November 2006, state Minister for Small Business Norm Marlborough resigned from parliament after it was revealed that he had lied to the Corruption and Crime Commission about his dealings with disgraced former Premier of Western Australia Brian Burke, thus triggering a by-election in his electorate of Peel. Peel had been held by the Labor Party since the seat's inception and was generally considered a safe Labor seat, but concerns about an electoral backlash over Marlborough's conduct led the party to look for a candidate without a political background. Papalia thus nominated for Labor preselection in the by-election, and was easily successful – despite having only joined the party weeks before – after receiving strong support from Premier Alan Carpenter. He went on to easily win the by-election, receiving a small swing in his favour in a seat that the government had feared they might lose.

The district of Peel was abolished with effect at the 2008 state election. Papalia instead successfully contested the new seat of Warnbro, essentially the northern three-fourths of his old seat. In March 2017, Papalia was appointed as a Minister in the new McGowan Government, with the portfolios for Tourism, Racing and Gaming, Small Business, Defence Issues, Citizenship and Multicultural Affairs. Following the March 2021 election, he was appointed as Minister for Police, Road Safety, Defence Industry and Veterans Issues. After the resignation of Mark McGowan, new Premier announced on 7 June Papalia would gain the portfolio of Corrective Services and lose Road Safety. After the resignation of Bill Johnston from the Cabinet, Papalia gained Racing and Gaming on 7 December. This continues the 4 years Papalia had the portfolio between 2017–2021.

Papalia was awarded the Order of the Star of Italy on 2 December 2021.

In the 2025 Western Australian state election, he was elected in the new seat of Secret Harbour.

Papalia is one of four Labor MPs in state parliament that is not factionally aligned as of 2025.

In 2026 Papalia announced he would be retiring from politics, leaving parliament on 10 July. His resignation resulted in a by-election on 29 August 2026.

Western Australian Legislative Assembly
Preceded by Norm Marlborough	Member for Peel; 2007–2008	District abolished
New district	Member for Warnbro; 2008–2025	District abolished
New district	Member for Secret Harbour; 2025–2026	Succeeded by Luke Herdegen
