= Norm Marlborough =

Australian politician

Member of the Western Australian Legislative Assembly for Cockburn (1986–1989) Peel (1989–2007)
- In office 7 June 1986 – 9 November 2007
- Preceded by: Clive Hughes
- Succeeded by: Paul Papalia

Personal details
- Born: Norman Richard Marlborough; 12 August 1945 (age 80) Westow, Yorkshire, England
- Party: Labor
- Profession: Union official

Norman Richard Marlborough (born 12 August 1945) is a former Australian politician.

== Biography ==
Originally from England, Marlborough was born in Westow, Yorkshire, and arrived in Western Australia in 1963. Before he entered parliament, he was a fitter and turner and later a union official. He was elected as a Labor Party member of the Western Australian Legislative Assembly for the seat of Cockburn at a by-election on 7 June 1986, following the death of Clive Hughes. In 1989, he transferred to the new seat of Peel after a redistribution.

Marlborough served in a number of Shadow portfolios and then in Government in Parliamentary Secretary roles. On 3 February 2006, he was promoted to the Cabinet as Minister for Small Business, Minister for the Peel and the South West, and Minister Assisting the Minister for Education and Training.

On 9 November 2006, Marlborough resigned from the ministry and from Parliament following the release of taped phone calls to disgraced former premier Brian Burke in which Burke advised Marlborough as to how to answer a question regarding the appointment to a government commission.

Marlborough is married to Ros Marlborough and has two sons, Patrick and Richard.

Western Australian Legislative Assembly
Preceded by Clive Hughes	Member for Cockburn; 1986–1989	Succeeded by Bill Thomas
Established	Member for Peel; 1989–2007	Succeeded by Paul Papalia
