= Results of the 2013 Western Australian state election (Legislative Assembly) =

Western Australian state election, 9 March 2013 Legislative Assembly << 2008–2017 >>
Enrolled voters	1,412,533				
Votes cast	1,260,052		Turnout	89.21%	+2.73%
Informal votes	75,577		Informal	6.00%	+0.68%
Summary of votes by party
Party	Primary votes	%	Swing	Seats	Change
Liberal	557,917	47.10	+8.71	31	+7
Labor	392,470	33.13	–2.70	21	–7
Greens	99,437	8.40	–3.52	0	±0
National	71,694	6.05	+1.18	7	+3
Christians	21,451	1.81	–0.77	0	±0
Family First	7,039	0.59	–1.35	0	±0
Independents	34,467	2.91	–1.44	0	–3
Total	1,184,475			59	
Two-party-preferred
Liberal/National	678,231	57.29%	+5.44%		
Labor	505,650	42.71%	–5.44%		

This is a list of electoral district results of the 2013 Western Australian election.

== Results by electoral district ==
=== Albany ===
2013 Western Australian state election: Albany
Party	Candidate	Votes	%	±%
Labor	Peter Watson	8,284	39.3	+0.2
Liberal	Trevor Cosh	6,061	28.8	–4.1
National	Robert Sutton	4,357	20.7	+7.4
Greens	Diane Evers	1,137	5.4	–2.2
Christians	Hans Vermeulen	831	3.9	–0.9
Family First	Barry Critchison	386	1.8	–0.4
Total formal votes		21,056	96.2	–0.9
Informal votes		828	3.8	+0.9
Turnout		21,884	92.8	+2.7
Two-party-preferred result
Labor	Peter Watson	10,957	52.0	+1.8
Liberal	Trevor Cosh	10,094	48.0	–1.8
Labor hold		Swing	+1.8	

=== Alfred Cove ===
2013 Western Australian state election: Alfred Cove
Party	Candidate	Votes	%	±%
Liberal	Dean Nalder	13,523	64.4	+19.4
Labor	David Houston	3,532	16.8	–3.2
Independent	Janet Woollard	2,114	10.1	–13.3
Greens	Ros Harman	1,665	7.9	–2.0
	Estelle Gom	161	0.8	+0.8
Total formal votes		20,995	95.2	–0.7
Informal votes		1,047	4.8	+0.7
Turnout		22,042	91.4	
Two-party-preferred result
Liberal	Dean Nalder	15,445	73.6	+23.8
Labor	David Houston	5,544	26.4	+26.4
Liberal gain from Independent		Swing	+23.8	

=== Armadale ===
2013 Western Australian state election: Armadale
Party	Candidate	Votes	%	±%
Labor	Tony Buti	10,836	53.7	–2.3
Liberal	Katherine Webster	6,613	32.8	+6.8
Christians	Jamie Van Burgel	1,403	7.0	–0.4
Greens	Damon Pages-Oliver	1,333	6.6	–4.2
Total formal votes		20,185	92.8	−1.2
Informal votes		1,562	7.2	+1.2
Turnout		21,747	87.8	
Two-party-preferred result
Labor	Tony Buti	12,032	59.6	–5.2
Liberal	Katherine Webster	8,149	40.4	+5.2
Labor hold		Swing	–5.2	

=== Balcatta ===
2013 Western Australian state election: Balcatta
Party	Candidate	Votes	%	±%
Liberal	Chris Hatton	10,756	51.9	+10.7
Labor	Janet Pettigrew	7,341	35.4	–6.5
Greens	Sheridan Young	1,705	8.2	–3.3
Christians	Peter Dodd	322	1.6	–2.0
Family First	Lesley Croll	264	1.3	–0.6
Independent	Joe Ruzzi	234	1.1	+1.1
Independent	Mubarak Kim Kidima	122	0.6	+0.6
Total formal votes		20,744	92.3	−0.7
Informal votes		1,727	7.7	+0.7
Turnout		22,471	89.6	
Two-party-preferred result
Liberal	Chris Hatton	11,886	57.3	+9.5
Labor	Janet Pettigrew	8,841	42.7	–9.5
Liberal gain from Labor		Swing	+9.5	

=== Bassendean ===
2013 Western Australian state election: Bassendean
Party	Candidate	Votes	%	±%
Labor	Dave Kelly	9,663	46.7	–0.7
Liberal	Bob Brown	8,167	39.5	+9.6
Greens	Jennie Carter	2,119	10.2	–4.9
Christians	Paul Mewhor	733	3.5	–1.8
Total formal votes		20,682	91.8	−0.7
Informal votes		1,854	9.1	+0.7
Turnout		22,536	90.1	
Two-party-preferred result
Labor	Dave Kelly	11,397	55.1	–5.2
Liberal	Bob Brown	9,273	44.9	+5.2
Labor hold		Swing	–5.2	

=== Bateman ===
2013 Western Australian state election: Bateman
Party	Candidate	Votes	%	±%
Liberal	Matt Taylor	12,697	64.1	+11.9
Labor	Rob Chasland	5,044	25.5	–4.1
Greens	Rebecca Leighton	2,081	10.5	–2.4
Total formal votes		19,822	93.2	−2.3
Informal votes		1,451	6.8	+2.3
Turnout		21,273	91.7	
Two-party-preferred result
Liberal	Matt Taylor	13,440	67.8	+8.4
Labor	Rob Chasland	6,372	32.2	–8.4
Liberal hold		Swing	+8.4	

=== Belmont ===
2013 Western Australian state election: Belmont
Party	Candidate	Votes	%	±%
Liberal	Glenys Godfrey	8,677	47.1	+13.2
Labor	Cassie Rowe	7,826	42.5	−1.0
Greens	Steve Wolff	1,503	8.2	−4.0
Christians	Steve Klomp	421	2.3	−0.8
Total formal votes		18,427	93.33	+0.34
Informal votes		1,317	6.67	−0.34
Turnout		19,744	87.48	+2.02
Two-party-preferred result
Liberal	Glenys Godfrey	9,376	50.9	+7.6
Labor	Cassie Rowe	9,046	49.1	−7.6
Liberal gain from Labor		Swing	+7.6	

=== Bunbury ===
2013 Western Australian state election: Bunbury
Party	Candidate	Votes	%	±%
Liberal	John Castrilli	10,375	52.7	+0.7
Labor	Karen Steele	5,595	28.4	–1.2
National	James Forsyth	1,562	7.9	+6.8
Greens	Mitchella Hutchins	1,250	6.4	–2.6
Family First	Linda Rose	374	1.9	–4.0
Independent	Lua Alfa Conedoli	285	1.4	+1.4
Christians	Edward Dabrowski	243	1.2	–0.9
Total formal votes		19,684	93.7	−1.5
Informal votes		1,320	6.3	+1.5
Turnout		21,004	89.2	
Two-party-preferred result
Liberal	John Castrilli	12,420	63.1	+2.0
Labor	Karen Steele	7,255	36.9	–2.0
Liberal hold		Swing	+2.0	

=== Butler ===
2013 Western Australian state election: Butler
Party	Candidate	Votes	%	±%
Labor	John Quigley	10,509	45.5	–4.4
Liberal	Linda Aitken	9,992	43.3	+9.3
Greens	Thomas Webster	2,067	8.9	−1.5
Christians	Steven Leeder	529	2.3	+0.1
Total formal votes		23,097	93.1	−1.5
Informal votes		1,699	6.9	+1.5
Turnout		24,796	86.8	
Two-party-preferred result
Labor	John Quigley	11,950	51.8	–8.6
Liberal	Linda Aitken	11,136	48.2	+8.6
Labor hold		Swing	–8.6	

=== Cannington ===
2013 Western Australian state election: Cannington
Party	Candidate	Votes	%	±%
Labor	Bill Johnston	8,457	43.8	–1.7
Liberal	Jesse Jacobs	8,310	43.0	+10.2
Greens	Christine Cunningham	1,850	9.6	–6.7
Independent	Mark Harrington	702	3.6	+3.6
Total formal votes		19,319	92.6	−0.4
Informal votes		1,536	7.4	+0.4
Turnout		20,855	87.8	
Two-party-preferred result
Labor	Bill Johnston	10,054	52.1	–7.0
Liberal	Jesse Jacobs	9,259	47.9	+7.0
Labor hold		Swing	–7.0	

=== Carine ===
2013 Western Australian state election: Carine
Party	Candidate	Votes	%	±%
Liberal	Tony Krsticevic	13,582	63.3	+18.2
Labor	Sharon Webb	5,278	24.6	+0.6
Greens	Nathalie Cattaneo	2,024	9.4	–2.9
Christians	Rick Davey	581	2.7	+0.4
Total formal votes		21,465	95.7	+0.1
Informal votes		959	4.3	−0.1
Turnout		22,424	91.7	
Two-party-preferred result
Liberal	Tony Krsticevic	14,625	68.1	+5.5
Labor	Sharon Webb	6,839	31.9	–5.5
Liberal hold		Swing	+5.5	

=== Central Wheatbelt ===
2013 Western Australian state election: Central Wheatbelt
Party	Candidate	Votes	%	±%
National	Mia Davies	8,414	43.6	–5.9
Liberal	Stephen Strange	6,088	31.5	+6.6
Labor	John Watters	3,375	17.5	+1.5
Greens	Tricia Walters	637	3.3	–2.2
Independent	Gerald Sturman	474	2.5	+2.5
Christians	Bob Adair	328	1.7	–1.5
Total formal votes		19,316	94.7	–1.4
Turnout		1,076	5.3	+1.4
Turnout		20,392	90.6	
Two-party-preferred result
Liberal	Stephen Strange	13,729	71.1	–0.2
Labor	John Watters	5,573	28.9	+0.2
Two-candidate-preferred result
National	Mia Davies	11,168	57.9	–10.9
Liberal	Stephen Strange	8,110	42.1	+10.9
National hold		Swing	–10.9	

=== Churchlands ===
2013 Western Australian state election: Churchlands
Party	Candidate	Votes	%	±%
Liberal	Sean L'Estrange	13,366	58.99	+58.99
Labor	Patrick Ashforth	3,543	15.64	−2.26
Independent	Wayne Monks	1,828	8.07	+8.07
Greens	Cameron Pidgeon	1,740	7.68	−7.12
Independent	Elizabeth Re	1,072	4.73	+4.73
Independent	Jim Bivoltsis	783	3.46	+3.46
Christians	Pat Seymour	327	1.44	+1.44
Total formal votes		22,659	96.47	
Informal votes		829	3.53	
Turnout		23,488	91.39	
Two-party-preferred result
Liberal	Sean L'Estrange	15,887	70.16	+70.16
Labor	Patrick Ashforth	6,756	29.84	+3.31
Liberal gain from Independent		Swing	+70.16	

=== Cockburn ===
2013 Western Australian state election: Cockburn
Party	Candidate	Votes	%	±%
Labor	Fran Logan	10,628	47.8	–0.5
Liberal	Don Barrett	9,336	42.0	+10.1
Greens	Shannon Hewitt	1,687	7.6	–5.0
Independent	Derek Rosborough	578	2.6	+2.6
Total formal votes		22,229	94.7	+2.1
Informal votes		1,235	5.3	−2.1
Turnout		23,464	90.7	
Two-party-preferred result
Labor	Fran Logan	11,993	54.1	–5.1
Liberal	Don Barrett	10,178	45.9	+5.1
Labor hold		Swing	–5.1	

=== Collie-Preston ===
2013 Western Australian state election: Collie-Preston
Party	Candidate	Votes	%	±%
Labor	Mick Murray	8,708	43.2	−1.0
Liberal	Jaimee Motion	8,250	40.9	+3.6
National	Peter Hutchinson	1,513	7.5	+7.5
Greens	Kingsley Gibson	1,010	5.0	−2.9
Family First	Alice Harper	529	2.6	−5.3
	Clinton Knop	158	0.8	+0.8
Total formal votes		20,168	95.0	−0.6
Informal votes		1,069	5.0	+0.6
Turnout		21,237	91.72	
Two-party-preferred result
Labor	Mick Murray	10,108	50.1	−3.7
Liberal	Jaimee Motion	10,052	49.9	+3.7
Labor hold		Swing	−3.7	

=== Cottesloe ===
2013 Western Australian state election: Cottesloe
Party	Candidate	Votes	%	±%
Liberal	Colin Barnett	14,036	64.7	+1.2
Labor	Emma Williams	2,650	12.2	–5.3
Independent	Kevin Morgan	2,482	11.4	+11.4
Greens	Greg Boland	2,246	10.4	–6.7
Christians	Neil Fearis	281	1.3	–0.7
Total formal votes		21,695	96.5	+0.8
Informal votes		781	3.5	−0.8
Turnout		22,476	90.0	
Two-party-preferred result
Liberal	Colin Barnett	15,380	70.9	+1.5
Labor	Emma Williams	6,307	29.1	–1.5
Liberal hold		Swing	+1.5	

=== Darling Range ===
2013 Western Australian state election: Darling Range
Party	Candidate	Votes	%	±%
Liberal	Tony Simpson	13,454	57.9	+9.7
Labor	Barry Urban	6,494	27.9	–5.6
Greens	Denise Hardie	2,144	9.2	–3.9
Christians	Madeleine Goiran	1,154	5.0	–0.2
Total formal votes		23,246	93.8	−0.8
Informal votes		1,539	6.2	+0.8
Turnout		24,785	91.7	
Two-party-preferred result
Liberal	Tony Simpson	15,178	65.3	+8.3
Labor	Barry Urban	8,065	34.7	–8.3
Liberal hold		Swing	+8.3	

=== Dawesville ===
2013 Western Australian state election: Dawesville
Party	Candidate	Votes	%	±%
Liberal	Kim Hames	11,700	56.0	+0.2
Labor	Fred Riebeling	6,050	28.9	–4.1
Independent	Dave Schumacher	1,236	5.9	+5.9
Greens	Patricia Armstrong	1,068	5.1	–1.6
National	Bryn Butler	488	2.3	+2.3
Family First	Brenton Baker	357	1.7	–0.9
Total formal votes		20,899	94.2	−1.1
Informal votes		1,297	5.8	+1.1
Turnout		22,196	89.6	
Two-party-preferred result
Liberal	Kim Hames	13,088	62.7	+1.5
Labor	Fred Riebeling	7,799	37.3	–1.5
Liberal hold		Swing	+1.5	

=== Eyre ===
2013 Western Australian state election: Eyre
Party	Candidate	Votes	%	±%
Liberal	Graham Jacobs	5,870	41.1	–4.8
National	Colin de Grussa	5,258	36.8	+9.9
Labor	Greg Smith	2,082	14.6	–4.7
Greens	Giorgia Johnson	715	5.0	–2.2
Christians	Brett Hilton	366	2.6	+2.6
Total formal votes		14,291	94.6	–0.3
Informal votes		816	5.4	+0.3
Turnout		15,107	87.3	
Two-party-preferred result
Liberal	Graham Jacobs	10,474	73.3	+4.0
Labor	Greg Smith	3,817	26.7	–4.0
Two-candidate-preferred result
Liberal	Graham Jacobs	7,203	50.4	–3.0
National	Colin de Grussa	7,078	49.6	+3.0
Liberal hold		Swing	–3.0	

=== Forrestfield ===
2013 Western Australian state election: Forrestfield
Party	Candidate	Votes	%	±%
Liberal	Nathan Morton	9,866	46.4	+5.5
Labor	Andrew Waddell	8,656	40.7	+1.2
Greens	Peter Burrell	1,434	6.7	–5.7
Family First	Mike Munro	678	3.2	–0.6
Christians	Troy Eikelboom	633	3.0	–0.4
Total formal votes		21,267	93.0	−0.5
Informal votes		1,600	7.0	+0.5
Turnout		22,867	89.8	
Two-party-preferred result
Liberal	Nathan Morton	11,076	52.1	+2.3
Labor	Andrew Waddell	10,185	47.9	–2.3
Liberal gain from Labor		Swing	+2.3	

=== Fremantle ===
2013 Western Australian state election: Fremantle
Party	Candidate	Votes	%	±%
Labor	Simone McGurk	8,249	38.2	–0.7
Liberal	Matthew Hanssen	7,760	35.9	+7.3
Greens	Andrew Sullivan	3,925	18.2	–8.5
Independent	Adele Carles	1,186	5.5	+5.5
	Sanna Andrew	252	1.2	+1.2
Independent	Jan Ter Horst	225	1.0	+1.0
Total formal votes		21,597	94.7	+0.3
Informal votes		1,219	5.3	−0.3
Turnout		22,816	88.0	
Two-party-preferred result
Labor	Simone McGurk	12,488	57.9	–4.2
Liberal	Matthew Hanssen	9,094	42.1	+4.2
Labor hold		Swing	–4.2	

=== Geraldton ===
2013 Western Australian state election: Geraldton
Party	Candidate	Votes	%	±%
Liberal	Ian Blayney	9,167	47.6	+10.7
National	Shane Van Styn	5,081	26.4	+7.1
Labor	Kathryn Mannion	3,299	17.1	–12.0
Greens	Paul Connolly	1,239	6.4	+0.7
Christians	Carmen Burdett	469	2.4	–0.6
Total formal votes		19,255	94.3	–1.3
Informal votes		1,161	5.7	+1.3
Turnout		20,416	89.7	
Two-party-preferred result
Liberal	Ian Blayney	14,013	72.8	+14.3
Labor	Kathryn Mannion	5,223	27.2	–14.3
Two-candidate-preferred result
Liberal	Ian Blayney	11,711	60.9	+2.4
National	Shane Van Styn	7,517	39.1	+39.1
Liberal hold		Swing	+2.4	

=== Girrawheen ===
2013 Western Australian state election: Girrawheen
Party	Candidate	Votes	%	±%
Labor	Margaret Quirk	9,724	44.1	–3.6
Liberal	John Halligan	9,408	42.6	+5.0
Greens	Saba Kafami	1,289	5.8	–5.9
Family First	Che Tam Nguyen	847	3.8	+3.4
Christians	Mel Davey	801	3.6	+1.9
Total formal votes		22,069	92.4	−0.7
Informal votes		1,824	7.6	+0.7
Turnout		23,893	90.1	
Two-party-preferred result
Labor	Margaret Quirk	11,557	52.4	–4.3
Liberal	John Halligan	10,501	47.6	+4.3
Labor hold		Swing	–4.3	

=== Gosnells ===
2013 Western Australian state election: Gosnells
Party	Candidate	Votes	%	±%
Labor	Chris Tallentire	9,237	44.8	+2.1
Liberal	David Goode	8,040	39.0	+2.6
Greens	Luke Edmonds	1,207	5.9	–6.4
Independent	Chris Fernandez	850	4.1	+4.1
Christians	Mark Staer	782	3.8	–0.7
Independent	Debbie Butler	501	2.4	+2.4
Total formal votes		20,617	92.5	−1.6
Informal votes		1,682	7.5	+1.6
Turnout		22,299	89.3	
Two-party-preferred result
Labor	Chris Tallentire	10,896	52.9	–1.9
Liberal	David Goode	9,701	47.1	+1.9
Labor hold		Swing	–1.9	

=== Hillarys ===
2013 Western Australian state election: Hillarys
Party	Candidate	Votes	%	±%
Liberal	Rob Johnson	13,484	64.3	+11.3
Labor	Sam Thomas	4,934	23.5	–3.9
Greens	Adam Collins	2,015	9.6	–2.3
Christians	Michael Ford	545	2.6	–0.1
Total formal votes		20,978	94.5	−0.4
Informal votes		1,232	5.5	+0.4
Turnout		22,210	90.3	
Two-party-preferred result
Liberal	Rob Johnson	14,463	69.0	+6.1
Labor	Sam Thomas	6,507	31.0	–6.1
Liberal hold		Swing	+6.1	

=== Jandakot ===
2013 Western Australian state election: Jandakot
Party	Candidate	Votes	%	±%
Liberal	Joe Francis	11,998	55.4	+10.9
Labor	Klara Andric	7,834	36.1	–0.9
Greens	John Haynes	1,841	8.5	–3.2
Total formal votes		21,673	94.1	−1.0
Informal votes		1,351	5.9	+1.0
Turnout		23,024	91.6	
Two-party-preferred result
Liberal	Joe Francis	12,584	58.1	+6.2
Labor	Klara Andric	9,085	41.9	–6.2
Liberal hold		Swing	+6.2	

=== Joondalup ===
2013 Western Australian state election: Joondalup
Party	Candidate	Votes	%	±%
Liberal	Jan Norberger	9,961	50.3	+11.9
Labor	Tony O'Gorman	7,519	37.9	–3.9
Greens	Brittany Young	1,837	9.3	–3.6
Christians	Geoff McDavitt	503	2.5	–0.7
Total formal votes		19,820	93.6	−0.8
Informal votes		1,349	6.4	+0.8
Turnout		21,169	88.8	
Two-party-preferred result
Liberal	Jan Norberger	10,796	54.5	+7.8
Labor	Tony O'Gorman	9,023	45.5	–7.8
Liberal gain from Labor		Swing	+7.8	

=== Kalamunda ===
2013 Western Australian state election: Kalamunda
Party	Candidate	Votes	%	±%
Liberal	John Day	9,624	47.5	–0.1
Labor	Mick Wainwright	4,480	22.1	–9.4
Independent	Geoff Stallard	2,780	13.7	+13.7
Greens	Toni Warden	1,658	8.2	–6.6
Independent	Greg Ross	1,120	5.5	+5.5
Christians	Hannah Williams	612	3.0	–1.1
Total formal votes		20,274	94.4	
Informal votes		1,213	5.6	
Turnout		21,487	90.5	
Two-party-preferred result
Liberal	John Day	12,241	60.5	+4.2
Labor	Mick Wainwright	8,008	39.5	–4.2
Liberal hold		Swing	+4.2	

=== Kalgoorlie ===
2013 Western Australian state election: Kalgoorlie
Party	Candidate	Votes	%	±%
Liberal	Melissa Price	3,748	37.3	+12.6
National	Wendy Duncan	3,717	37.0	+18.0
Labor	Terrence Winner	1,928	19.2	+1.6
Greens	Tim Hall	450	4.5	0.0
Christians	Ross Patterson	202	2.0	+2.0
Total formal votes		10,045	94.3	0.0
Informal votes		602	5.7	0.0
Turnout		10,647	80.7	
Two-party-preferred result
Liberal	Melissa Price	6,715	66.9	+7.1
Labor	Terrence Winner	3,324	33.1	–7.1
Two-candidate-preferred result
National	Wendy Duncan	5,651	56.3	+9.8
Liberal	Melissa Price	4,379	43.7	+43.7
National gain from Independent		Swing	+16.1	

=== Kimberley ===
2013 Western Australian state election: Kimberley
Party	Candidate	Votes	%	±%
Labor	Josie Farrer	3,030	26.7	−14.6
Liberal	Jenny Bloom	2,924	25.7	−0.3
Greens	Chris Maher	2,664	23.5	+10.1
National	Michele Pucci	2,085	18.4	+0.1
Independent	Rod Ogilvie	499	4.4	+4.4
Christians	Craig Simons	158	1.4	+1.4
Total formal votes		11,360	94.0	−1.5
Informal votes		595	6.0	+1.5
Turnout		11,955	73.0	+11.0
Two-party-preferred result
Labor	Josie Farrer	6,255	55.1	−1.7
Liberal	Jenny Bloom	5,100	44.9	+1.7
Labor hold		Swing	−1.7	

=== Kingsley ===
2013 Western Australian state election: Kingsley
Party	Candidate	Votes	%	±%
Liberal	Andrea Mitchell	13,030	60.0	+12.0
Labor	Brian Corr	6,326	29.1	–6.3
Greens	Diana MacTiernan	1,846	8.5	–2.9
Christians	Sophie Ann Mason	510	2.3	–0.3
Total formal votes		21,712	94.7	−0.3
Informal votes		1,207	5.3	+0.3
Turnout		22,919	5.3	
Two-party-preferred result
Liberal	Andrea Mitchell	14,056	64.8	+10.2
Labor	Brian Corr	7,640	35.2	–10.2
Liberal hold		Swing	+10.2	

=== Kwinana ===
2013 Western Australian state election: Kwinana
Party	Candidate	Votes	%	±%
Labor	Roger Cook	9,819	43.8	+2.3
Independent	Carol Adams	5,406	24.1	+2.0
Liberal	John Jamieson	5,330	23.8	+3.6
Greens	Iwan Boskamp	1,340	6.0	−4.7
Christians	Stephen Wardell-Kohnson	536	2.4	+2.4
Total formal votes		22,431	93.2	−1.2
Informal votes		1,633	6.8	+1.2
Turnout		24,064	87.85	
Two-party-preferred result
Labor	Roger Cook	13,869	61.8	−4.6
Liberal	John Jamieson	8,560	38.2	+4.6
Two-candidate-preferred result
Labor	Roger Cook	11,783	52.6	+2.5
Independent	Carol Adams	10,633	47.4	−2.5
Labor hold		Swing	+2.5	

=== Mandurah ===
2013 Western Australian state election: Mandurah
Party	Candidate	Votes	%	±%
Labor	David Templeman	10,507	52.5	–0.4
Liberal	Tony Solin	7,531	37.6	+3.5
Greens	Chilla Bulbeck	724	3.6	–2.5
Family First	Andrew Newhouse	527	2.6	–1.2
National	Jake Ash	367	1.8	+1.8
Independent	John Hughes	261	1.3	+1.3
Independent	Charles Bryant	102	0.5	+0.5
Total formal votes		20,019	95.4	+0.9
Informal votes		957	4.6	−0.9
Turnout		20,976	88.2	
Two-party-preferred result
Labor	David Templeman	11,550	57.7	–2.8
Liberal	Tony Solin	8,465	42.3	+2.8
Labor hold		Swing	–2.8	

=== Maylands ===
2013 Western Australian state election: Maylands
Party	Candidate	Votes	%	±%
Liberal	Sylvan Albert	8,893	42.8	+8.7
Labor	Lisa Baker	8,796	42.3	–1.2
Greens	Dee O'Neill	2,554	12.3	–6.6
Christians	Paul Madden	533	2.6	–0.9
Total formal votes		20,776	93.5	−0.2
Informal votes		1,445	6.5	+0.2
Turnout		22,221	88.8	
Two-party-preferred result
Labor	Lisa Baker	11,020	53.1	–5.7
Liberal	Sylvan Albert	9,751	46.9	+5.7
Labor hold		Swing	–5.7	

=== Midland ===
2013 Western Australian state election: Midland
Party	Candidate	Votes	%	±%
Liberal	Daniel Parasiliti	9,362	46.2	+11.5
Labor	Michelle Roberts	8,489	41.9	−4.9
Greens	Pippa Tandy	1,905	9.4	−5.6
Christians	Isaac Moran	520	2.6	−1.0
Total formal votes		20,276	93.6	−0.0
Informal votes		1,386	6.4	−0.0
Turnout		21,662	89.5	+2.6
Two-party-preferred result
Labor	Michelle Roberts	10,142	50.1	−8.2
Liberal	Daniel Parasiliti	10,118	49.9	+8.2
Labor hold		Swing	−8.2	

=== Mirrabooka ===
2013 Western Australian state election: Mirrabooka
Party	Candidate	Votes	%	±%
Labor	Janine Freeman	9,661	47.7	−4.2
Liberal	Andrea Creado	7,879	38.9	+8.0
Greens	Mark William Cooper	1,757	8.7	−4.4
Christians	Lois Host	954	4.7	+0.9
Total formal votes		20,251	90.0	−2.0
Informal votes		2,239	10.0	+2.0
Turnout		22,490	87.5	
Two-party-preferred result
Labor	Janine Freeman	11,045	54.6	−8.4
Liberal	Andrea Creado	9,195	45.4	+8.4
Labor hold		Swing	−8.4	

=== Moore ===
2013 Western Australian state election: Moore
Party	Candidate	Votes	%	±%
Liberal	Chris Wilkins	7,896	39.0	–1.5
National	Shane Love	7,510	37.1	+4.8
Labor	Peter Johnson	3,316	16.4	–0.3
Greens	Dee Margetts	1,131	5.6	–0.6
Christians	Wes Porter	386	1.9	+0.2
Total formal votes		20,239	95.0	–0.3
Informal votes		1,059	5.0	+0.3
Turnout		21,298	90.6	
Two-party-preferred result
Liberal	Chris Wilkins	14,810	73.2	+1.2
Labor	Peter Johnson	5,415	26.8	–1.2
Two-candidate-preferred result
National	Shane Love	11,299	55.9	+2.8
Liberal	Chris Wilkins	8,923	44.1	–2.8
National hold		Swing	+2.8	

=== Morley ===
2013 Western Australian state election: Morley
Party	Candidate	Votes	%	±%
Liberal	Ian Britza	9,932	49.9	+14.7
Labor	Reece Whitby	7,868	39.5	+1.7
Greens	Sally Palmer	1,371	6.9	−3.2
Christians	Ross Fraser	430	2.2	−1.2
Family First	Greg Halls	305	1.5	+1.5
Total formal votes		19,906	90.5	−1.7
Informal votes		1,851	9.5	+1.7
Turnout		21,757	89.9	
Two-party-preferred result
Liberal	Ian Britza	10,889	54.7	+5.5
Labor	Reece Whitby	9,003	45.3	−5.5
Liberal gain from Labor		Swing	+5.5	

=== Mount Lawley ===
2013 Western Australian state election: Mount Lawley
Party	Candidate	Votes	%	±%
Liberal	Michael Sutherland	11,537	54.5	+9.6
Labor	Bob Kucera	6,888	32.6	–2.8
Greens	Tim Clifford	2,086	9.9	–3.6
Christians	Paul Connelly	452	2.1	–0.8
Family First	Dave Bolt	187	0.9	–0.6
Total formal votes		21,150	93.6	−0.9
Informal votes		1,446	6.4	+0.9
Turnout		22,596	89.4	
Two-party-preferred result
Liberal	Michael Sutherland	12,551	59.4	+7.7
Labor	Bob Kucera	8,594	40.6	–7.7
Liberal hold		Swing	+7.7	

=== Murray-Wellington ===
2013 Western Australian state election: Murray-Wellington
Party	Candidate	Votes	%	±%
Liberal	Murray Cowper	10,044	49.9	+4.9
Labor	David Scaife	5,674	28.2	–1.4
National	Michael Rose	2,280	11.3	+3.3
Greens	Deni Fuller	1,134	5.6	–1.2
Family First	Laurie Rankin	621	3.1	–3.1
Independent	Norm Heslington	383	1.9	+1.9
Total formal votes		20,136	93.0	−1.1
Informal votes		1,507	7.0	+1.1
Turnout		21,643	90.5	
Two-party-preferred result
Liberal	Murray Cowper	12,476	62.0	+3.2
Labor	David Scaife	7,653	38.0	–3.2
Liberal hold		Swing	+3.2	

=== Nedlands ===
2013 Western Australian state election: Nedlands
Party	Candidate	Votes	%	±%
Liberal	Bill Marmion	12,351	58.4	+14.3
Labor	Tony Walker	2,987	14.1	–1.7
Independent	Max Hipkins	2,758	13.0	+13.0
Greens	George Crisp	2,752	13.0	–1.1
Christians	Gail Forder	316	1.5	+0.3
Total formal votes		21,164	96.2	−0.5
Informal votes		827	3.8	+0.5
Turnout		21,991	90.0	
Two-party-preferred result
Liberal	Bill Marmion	14,622	69.1	+2.5
Labor	Tony Walker	6,529	30.9	–2.5
Liberal hold		Swing	+2.5	

=== North West Central ===
2013 Western Australian state election: North West Central
Party	Candidate	Votes	%	±%
National	Vince Catania	3,235	44.2	+21.4
Liberal	Tami Maitre	2,114	28.9	–0.4
Labor	Jennifer Shelton	1,523	20.8	–11.9
Greens	Des Pike	364	5.0	–0.9
Christians	Andrew Eddison	86	1.2	+1.2
Total formal votes		7262	94.1	–1.5
Informal votes		454	5.9	+1.5
Turnout		7,716	79.3	
Two-party-preferred result
Liberal	Tami Maitre	4,611	63.5	+10.2
Labor	Jennifer Shelton	2,649	36.5	–10.2
Two-candidate-preferred result
National	Vince Catania	4,334	59.3	+59.7
Liberal	Tami Maitre	2,925	40.7	–13.0
National hold		Swing	+59.7	

=== Ocean Reef ===
2013 Western Australian state election: Ocean Reef
Party	Candidate	Votes	%	±%
Liberal	Albert Jacob	13,700	65.1	+18.8
Labor	Philippa Taylor	5,384	25.6	–13.1
Greens	Mary O'Byrne	1,409	6.7	–3.5
Christians	Lyn Kennedy	301	1.4	–0.6
Family First	Aliné Croll	243	1.2	–1.7
Total formal votes		21,037	93.6	−1.3
Informal votes		1,430	6.4	+1.3
Turnout		22,467	90.1	
Two-party-preferred result
Liberal	Albert Jacob	14,507	69.0	+16.3
Labor	Philippa Taylor	6,527	31.0	–16.3
Liberal hold		Swing	+16.3	

=== Perth ===
2013 Western Australian state election: Perth
Party	Candidate	Votes	%	±%
Liberal	Eleni Evangel	10,318	48.6	+12.0
Labor	John Hyde	7,666	36.1	−4.8
Greens	Jonathan Hallett	2,706	12.8	−6.6
Christians	Kevin Host	324	1.5	−1.5
Independent	Farida Iqbal	198	0.9	+0.9
Total formal votes		21,212	94.2	−0.7
Informal votes		1,300	5.8	+0.7
Turnout		22,512	86.4	
Two-party-preferred result
Liberal	Eleni Evangel	11,165	52.6	+10.4
Labor	John Hyde	10,045	47.4	−10.4
Liberal gain from Labor		Swing	+10.4	

=== Pilbara ===
2013 Western Australian state election: Pilbara
Party	Candidate	Votes	%	±%
National	Brendon Grylls	4,866	38.6	+15.9
Labor	Kelly Howlett	3,758	29.8	–13.5
Liberal	George Levissianos	2,911	23.1	+3.7
Greens	Julie Matheson	628	5.0	–4.6
Independent	Brent McKenna	267	2.1	+2.1
Christians	Bruce Richards	168	1.3	+1.3
Total formal votes		12,598	95.0	–0.2
Informal votes		663	5.0	+0.2
Turnout		13,261	76.7	
Two-party-preferred result
Liberal	George Levissianos	6,774	53.8	+53.8
Labor	Kelly Howlett	5,823	46.2	–11.0
Two-candidate-preferred result
National	Brendon Grylls	7,739	61.5	+18.7
Labor	Kelly Howlett	4,850	38.5	–18.7
National gain from Labor		Swing	+18.7	

=== Riverton ===
2013 Western Australian state election: Riverton
Party	Candidate	Votes	%	±%
Liberal	Mike Nahan	11,807	56.3	+13.6
Labor	Hannah Beazley	7,388	35.2	–3.2
Greens	Marcus Atkinson	1,291	6.2	–4.6
Independent	Joe Delle Donne	477	2.3	+2.3
Total formal votes		20,963	94.4	−0.8
Informal votes		1,237	5.6	+0.8
Turnout		22,200	92.2	
Two-party-preferred result
Liberal	Mike Nahan	12,405	59.2	+7.2
Labor	Hannah Beazley	8,553	40.8	–7.2
Liberal hold		Swing	+7.2	

=== Rockingham ===
2013 Western Australian state election: Rockingham
Party	Candidate	Votes	%	±%
Labor	Mark McGowan	11,716	56.4	+5.4
Liberal	Matthew Pollock	6,743	32.5	–0.4
Greens	Dawn Jecks	1,265	6.1	–6.8
Independent	Matthew Whitfield	610	2.9	+2.9
Christians	John Wieske	440	2.1	+2.1
Total formal votes		20,773	93.9	−0.4
Informal votes		1,341	6.1	+0.4
Turnout		22,114	88.0	
Two-party-preferred result
Labor	Mark McGowan	13,127	63.2	+1.8
Liberal	Matthew Pollock	7,642	36.8	–1.8
Labor hold		Swing	+1.8	

=== Scarborough ===
2013 Western Australian state election: Scarborough
Party	Candidate	Votes	%	±%
Liberal	Liza Harvey	12,681	61.8	+17.7
Labor	Eddie Lennie	5,036	24.6	–5.8
Greens	Judith Cullity	2,294	11.2	–1.4
Christians	Bruce Olsen	495	2.4	+0.3
Total formal votes		20,506	94.7	−0.5
Informal votes		1,156	5.3	+0.5
Turnout		21,662	87.8	
Two-party-preferred result
Liberal	Liza Harvey	13,792	67.3	+12.1
Labor	Eddie Lennie	6,705	32.7	–12.1
Liberal hold		Swing	+12.1	

=== Southern River ===
2013 Western Australian state election: Southern River
Party	Candidate	Votes	%	±%
Liberal	Peter Abetz	13,949	63.1	+18.2
Labor	Susy Thomas	6,421	29.0	–9.6
Greens	Kate Gnanapragasam	1,176	5.3	–4.8
Christians	Damian Posthuma	570	2.6	–0.3
Total formal votes		22,116	93.8	−0.2
Informal votes		1,464	6.2	+0.2
Turnout		23,580	90.8	
Two-party-preferred result
Liberal	Peter Abetz	14,777	67.0	+15.1
Labor	Susy Thomas	7,286	33.0	–15.1
Liberal hold		Swing	+15.1	

=== South Perth ===
2013 Western Australian state election: South Perth
Party	Candidate	Votes	%	±%
Liberal	John McGrath	13,654	67.0	+14.1
Labor	Dustin Rafferty	4,432	21.7	–2.2
Greens	Peter Best	1,800	8.8	–1.7
Independent	David Mangini	501	2.5	+2.5
Total formal votes		20,387	94.9	−0.8
Informal votes		1,095	5.1	+0.8
Turnout		21,482	88.6	
Two-party-preferred result
Liberal	John McGrath	14,494	71.1	+6.8
Labor	Dustin Rafferty	5,890	28.9	–6.8
Liberal hold		Swing	+6.8	

=== Swan Hills ===
2013 Western Australian state election: Swan Hills
Party	Candidate	Votes	%	±%
Liberal	Frank Alban	11,446	50.7	+5.5
Labor	Ian Radisich	8,159	36.1	+3.8
Greens	Dominique Lieb	2,028	9.0	–7.9
Christians	John Tapley	481	2.1	–0.7
Family First	Kyran Sharrin	460	2.0	–0.7
Total formal votes		22,574	94.5	−0.2
Informal votes		1,312	5.5	+0.2
Turnout		23,886	91.4	
Two-party-preferred result
Liberal	Frank Alban	12,610	55.9	+2.4
Labor	Ian Radisich	9,958	44.1	–2.4
Liberal hold		Swing	+2.4	

=== Vasse ===
2013 Western Australian state election: Vasse
Party	Candidate	Votes	%	±%
Liberal	Troy Buswell	11,593	57.3	–4.1
Labor	Lee Edmundson	2,501	12.4	–8.3
Greens	Michael Baldock	2,026	10.0	–5.6
Independent	Bernie Masters	1,624	8.0	+8.0
National	James Wishart	1,474	7.3	+7.3
Independent	Gary Norden	601	3.0	+3.0
Family First	Julie Westbrook	412	2.0	+2.0
Total formal votes		20,231	96.0	+0.5
Informal votes		848	4.0	−0.5
Turnout		21,079	91.2	
Two-party-preferred result
Liberal	Troy Buswell	14,396	71.2	+3.4
Labor	Lee Edmundson	5,822	28.8	–3.4
Liberal hold		Swing	+3.4	

=== Victoria Park ===
2013 Western Australian state election: Victoria Park
Party	Candidate	Votes	%	±%
Labor	Ben Wyatt	8,978	44.7	–2.1
Liberal	Haider Zaman	8,591	42.7	+8.3
Greens	Sarah Newbold	2,528	12.6	–1.4
Total formal votes		20,097	93.5	−1.8
Informal votes		1,402	6.5	+1.8
Turnout		21,499	85.6	
Two-party-preferred result
Labor	Ben Wyatt	10,865	54.1	–4.9
Liberal	Haider Zaman	9,226	45.9	+4.9
Labor hold		Swing	–4.9	

=== Wagin ===
2013 Western Australian state election: Wagin
Party	Candidate	Votes	%	±%
National	Terry Waldron	12,108	63.7	+0.4
Liberal	Phillip Blight	3,316	17.4	+0.3
Labor	Josh Stokes	2,122	11.2	+0.4
Greens	Shirley Collins	849	4.5	+0.7
Christians	Jacky Young	620	3.3	–0.6
Total formal votes		19,015	95.6	–1.1
Informal votes		869	4.4	+1.1
Turnout		19,884	90.7	
Two-party-preferred result
Liberal	Phillip Blight	14,408	75.8	+0.9
Labor	Josh Stokes	4,588	24.2	–0.9
Two-candidate-preferred result
National	Terry Waldron	14,623	76.9	–1.5
Liberal	Phillip Blight	4,390	23.1	+1.5
National hold		Swing	–1.5	

=== Wanneroo ===
2013 Western Australian state election: Wanneroo
Party	Candidate	Votes	%	±%
Liberal	Paul Miles	11,932	55.7	+11.8
Labor	Brett Treby	6,887	32.1	–7.4
Greens	Rob Phillips	1,611	7.5	–1.5
Christians	Meg Birch	550	2.6	+0.2
Family First	Moyna Rapp	446	2.1	–1.0
Total formal votes		21,426	93.4	−1.4
Informal votes		1,504	6.6	+1.4
Turnout		22,930	90.3	
Two-party-preferred result
Liberal	Paul Miles	13,089	61.1	+10.2
Labor	Brett Treby	8,328	38.9	–10.2
Liberal hold		Swing	+10.2	

=== Warnbro ===
2013 Western Australian state election: Warnbro
Party	Candidate	Votes	%	±%
Labor	Paul Papalia	12,153	52.8	+4.0
Liberal	Joel Marks	8,846	38.4	+6.7
Greens	Jordon Steele-John	2,016	8.8	–3.4
Total formal votes		23,015	92.7	−2.1
Informal votes		1,800	7.3	+2.1
Turnout		24,815	88.4	
Two-party-preferred result
Labor	Paul Papalia	13,534	58.8	–1.3
Liberal	Joel Marks	9,481	41.2	+1.3
Labor hold		Swing	–1.3	

=== Warren-Blackwood ===
2013 Western Australian state election: Warren-Blackwood
Party	Candidate	Votes	%	±%
National	Terry Redman	7,439	33.5	+5.7
Liberal	Ray Colyer	6,699	30.2	−3.5
Greens	Nerilee Boshammer	3,612	16.3	+1.2
Labor	John Thorpe	3,331	15.0	−3.2
Independent	Louie Scibilia	425	1.9	+1.9
Family First	Phillip Douglass	403	1.8	+0.2
	Kim Redman	273	1.2	+1.2
Total formal votes		22,182	94.4	–1.4
Informal votes		1,322	5.6	+1.4
Turnout		23,504	91.3	
Two-party-preferred result
Liberal	Ray Colyer	14,542	65.6	+4.8
Labor	John Thorpe	7,637	34.4	–4.8
Two-candidate-preferred result
National	Terry Redman	11,769	53.1	−7.0
Liberal	Ray Colyer	10,393	46.9	+7.0
National hold		Swing	−7.0	

=== West Swan ===
2013 Western Australian state election: West Swan
Party	Candidate	Votes	%	±%
Labor	Rita Saffioti	10,617	48.0	+2.5
Liberal	Natasha Cheung	9,900	44.7	+6.6
Greens	Peter Leam	1,059	4.8	–4.5
Christians	Esther Wieske	557	2.5	–1.5
Total formal votes		22,133	93.2	−0.9
Informal votes		1,622	6.8	+0.9
Turnout		23,755	90.5	
Two-party-preferred result
Labor	Rita Saffioti	11,487	51.9	–2.2
Liberal	Natasha Cheung	10,644	48.1	+2.2
Labor hold		Swing	–2.2	

=== Willagee ===
2013 Western Australian state election: Willagee
Party	Candidate	Votes	%	±%
Labor	Peter Tinley	9,280	46.5	–5.6
Liberal	Samuel Piipponen	7,097	35.6	+5.7
Greens	Alisha Ryans-Taylor	2,634	13.2	–4.1
	Sam Wainwright	397	2.0	+2.0
Independent	Teresa van Lieshout	361	1.8	+1.8
Independent	Wayne Shortland	181	0.9	+0.9
Total formal votes		19,950	93.3	+0.3
Informal votes		1,431	6.7	−0.3
Turnout		21,381	89.5	
Two-party-preferred result
Labor	Peter Tinley	12,080	60.6	–4.5
Liberal	Samuel Piipponen	7,856	39.4	+4.5
Labor hold		Swing	–4.5	

== See also ==
- Results of the Western Australian state election, 2013 (Legislative Council)
- 2013 Western Australian state election
- Candidates of the Western Australian state election, 2013
- Members of the Western Australian Legislative Assembly, 2013–2017
