= Electoral results for the district of Forrestfield =

Western Australian district election results

This is a list of electoral results for the electoral district of Forrestfield in Western Australian state elections.

== Members for Forrestfield ==
Member	Party	Term
Andrew Waddell	Labor	2008–2013
Nathan Morton	Liberal	2013–2017
Stephen Price	Labor	2017–present

== Election results ==
=== Elections in the 2020s ===
2025 Western Australian state election: Forrestfield
Party	Candidate	Votes	%	±%
Labor	Stephen Price	11,257	41.4	−24.3
Liberal	George Tilbury	8,899	32.7	+10.9
Greens	River Clarke	2,491	9.2	+4.2
One Nation	Peter Nicholls	1,274	4.7	+2.6
National	Ian Blayney	1,075	4.0	+4.0
Legalise Cannabis	Steve Emmons	968	3.6	+3.6
Christians	Jacob Morrow	835	3.1	+0.5
Shooters, Fishers, Farmers	Chris D. Munro	405	1.5	+1.5
Total formal votes		27,204	95.6	−0.6
Informal votes		1,252	4.4	+0.6
Turnout		28,456	86.4	+2.1
Two-party-preferred result
Labor	Stephen Price	14,913	54.8	−18.0
Liberal	George Tilbury	12,280	45.2	+18.0
Labor hold		Swing	−18.0	

Results are not final. Last updated on 24 March 2025 at 1:00 PM AWST

2021 Western Australian state election: Forrestfield
Party	Candidate	Votes	%	±%
Labor	Stephen Price	15,770	68.6	+22.3
Liberal	George Tilbury	4,438	19.3	−10.7
Greens	Beth McMullan	1,008	4.4	−2.1
Christians	Peter Lampard	604	2.6	−0.2
One Nation	Roger Barnett	518	2.3	−7.8
No Mandatory Vaccination	Cameron Peters	339	1.5	+1.5
Western Australia	Owen Doye	207	0.9	+0.9
WAxit	Mohammod Shahalam	99	0.4	−0.6
Total formal votes		22,983	96.1	+1.3
Informal votes		927	3.9	−1.3
Turnout		23,910	85.4	−1.5
Two-party-preferred result
Labor	Stephen Price	17,349	75.5	+16.1
Liberal	George Tilbury	5,629	24.5	−16.1
Labor hold		Swing	+16.1	

=== Elections in the 2010s ===
2017 Western Australian state election: Forrestfield
Party	Candidate	Votes	%	±%
Labor	Stephen Price	10,357	46.3	+5.8
Liberal	Nathan Morton	6,709	30.0	−16.4
One Nation	Jenny Bennett	2,244	10.0	+10.0
Greens	Eugene Marshall	1,443	6.5	−0.4
Animal Justice	Ashley Jago	747	3.3	+3.3
Christians	Brett Crook	631	2.8	−0.2
Micro Business	M. Shahalam	222	1.0	+1.0
Total formal votes		22,353	94.8	+1.8
Informal votes		1,217	5.2	−1.8
Turnout		23,570	87.3	+1.2
Two-party-preferred result
Labor	Stephen Price	13,281	59.4	+11.6
Liberal	Nathan Morton	9,067	40.6	−11.6
Labor gain from Liberal		Swing	+11.6	

2013 Western Australian state election: Forrestfield
Party	Candidate	Votes	%	±%
Liberal	Nathan Morton	9,866	46.4	+5.5
Labor	Andrew Waddell	8,656	40.7	+1.2
Greens	Peter Burrell	1,434	6.7	–5.7
Family First	Mike Munro	678	3.2	–0.6
Christians	Troy Eikelboom	633	3.0	–0.4
Total formal votes		21,267	93.0	−0.5
Informal votes		1,600	7.0	+0.5
Turnout		22,867	89.8	
Two-party-preferred result
Liberal	Nathan Morton	11,076	52.1	+2.3
Labor	Andrew Waddell	10,185	47.9	–2.3
Liberal gain from Labor		Swing	+2.3	

=== Elections in the 2000s ===
2008 Western Australian state election: Forrestfield
Party	Candidate	Votes	%	±%
Liberal	Nathan Morton	8,153	40.9	+3.4
Labor	Andrew Waddell	7,884	39.5	−6.1
Greens	Owen Davies	2,488	12.5	+5.8
Family First	Lisa Saladine	747	3.7	+1.1
Christian Democrats	Joel Hammen	672	3.4	−0.6
Total formal votes		19,944	93.5	−0.9
Informal votes		1,394	6.5	+0.9
Turnout		21,338	88.0	
Two-party-preferred result
Labor	Andrew Waddell	10,017	50.2	−4.3
Liberal	Nathan Morton	9,919	49.8	+4.3
Labor hold		Swing	−4.3	
