= Members of the Western Australian Legislative Assembly, 2013–2017 =

This is a list of members of the Western Australian Legislative Assembly from 2013 to 2017.

| Name | Party | District | Term in office |
|---|---|---|---|
| Peter Abetz | Liberal | Southern River | 2008–2017 |
| Frank Alban | Liberal | Swan Hills | 2008–2017 |
| Lisa Baker | Labor | Maylands | 2008–2025 |
| Colin Barnett | Liberal | Cottesloe | 1990–2018 |
| Ian Blayney | Liberal | Geraldton | 2008–2021 |
| Ian Britza | Liberal | Morley | 2008–2017 |
| Troy Buswell ^{[1]} | Liberal | Vasse | 2005–2014 |
| Tony Buti | Labor | Armadale | 2010–present |
| John Castrilli | Liberal | Bunbury | 2005–2017 |
| Vince Catania | National | North West Central | 2008–2022 |
| Roger Cook | Labor | Kwinana | 2008–present |
| Murray Cowper | Liberal | Murray-Wellington | 2005–2017 |
| Mia Davies | National | Central Wheatbelt | 2013–2025 |
| John Day | Liberal | Kalamunda | 1993–2017 |
| Wendy Duncan | National | Kalgoorlie | 2013–2017 |
| Eleni Evangel | Liberal | Perth | 2013–2017 |
| Josie Farrer | Labor | Kimberley | 2013–2021 |
| Joe Francis | Liberal | Jandakot | 2008–2017 |
| Janine Freeman | Labor | Mirrabooka | 2008–2021 |
| Glenys Godfrey | Liberal | Belmont | 2013–2017 |
| Brendon Grylls | National | Pilbara | 2001–2017 |
| Kim Hames | Liberal | Dawesville | 1993–2001; 2005–2017 |
| Liza Harvey | Liberal | Scarborough | 2008–2021 |
| Chris Hatton | Liberal | Balcatta | 2013–2017 |
| Albert Jacob | Liberal | Ocean Reef | 2008–2017 |
| Graham Jacobs | Liberal | Eyre | 2005–2017 |
| Rob Johnson | Liberal | Hillarys | 1993–2017 |
| Rob Johnson | Independent^{[2]} | Hillarys | 1993–2017 |
| Bill Johnston | Labor | Cannington | 2008–2025 |
| Dave Kelly | Labor | Bassendean | 2013–present |
| Tony Krsticevic | Liberal | Carine | 2008–2021 |
| Sean L'Estrange | Liberal | Churchlands | 2013–2021 |
| Fran Logan | Labor | Cockburn | 2001–2021 |
| Shane Love | National | Moore | 2013–present |
| Bill Marmion | Liberal | Nedlands | 2008–2021 |
| Mark McGowan | Labor | Rockingham | 1996–2023 |
| John McGrath | Liberal | South Perth | 2005–2021 |
| Simone McGurk | Labor | Fremantle | 2013–present |
| Libby Mettam ^{[1]} | Liberal | Vasse | 2014–present |
| Paul Miles | Liberal | Wanneroo | 2008–2017 |
| Andrea Mitchell | Liberal | Kingsley | 2008–2017 |
| Nathan Morton | Liberal | Forrestfield | 2013–2017 |
| Mick Murray | Labor | Collie-Preston | 2001–2021 |
| Mike Nahan | Liberal | Riverton | 2008–2021 |
| Dean Nalder | Liberal | Alfred Cove | 2013–2021 |
| Jan Norberger | Liberal | Joondalup | 2013–2017 |
| Paul Papalia | Labor | Warnbro | 2007–2026 |
| John Quigley | Labor | Butler | 2001–2025 |
| Margaret Quirk | Labor | Girrawheen | 2001–2025 |
| Terry Redman | National | Warren-Blackwood | 2005–2021 |
| Michelle Roberts | Labor | Midland | 1994–2025 |
| Rita Saffioti | Labor | West Swan | 2008–present |
| Tony Simpson | Liberal | Darling Range | 2005–2017 |
| Michael Sutherland | Liberal | Mount Lawley | 2008–2017 |
| Chris Tallentire | Labor | Gosnells | 2008–2025 |
| Matt Taylor | Liberal | Bateman | 2013–2017 |
| David Templeman | Labor | Mandurah | 2001–2025 |
| Peter Tinley | Labor | Willagee | 2009–2025 |
| Terry Waldron | National | Wagin | 2001–2017 |
| Peter Watson | Labor | Albany | 2001–2021 |
| Ben Wyatt | Labor | Victoria Park | 2006–2021 |

^{1} On 3 September 2014, the Liberal member for Vasse, Troy Buswell, resigned. Liberal candidate Libby Mettam was elected to replace him at the by-election for Vasse on 18 October 2014.
^{2} On 15 April 2016, the Liberal member for Hillarys, Rob Johnson, resigned from the Liberal Party to sit as an Independent.
