= Electoral results for the district of Bateman =

Western Australian district election results

This is a list of electoral results for the electoral district of Bateman in Western Australian state elections.

== Members for Bateman ==
Member	Party	Term
Christian Porter	Liberal	2008–2013
Matt Taylor	Liberal	2013–2017
Dean Nalder	Liberal	2017–2021
Kim Giddens	Labor	2021–present

== Election results ==
=== Elections in the 2020s ===
2025 Western Australian state election: Bateman
Party	Candidate	Votes	%	±%
Labor	Kim Giddens	11,093	40.2	−5.6
Liberal	Nitin Vashisht	9,455	34.3	−2.7
Greens	Juanita Doorey	2,910	10.5	+3.7
National	Donna Gordin	1,689	6.1	+6.1
Christians	Kirsty Robbie	1,000	3.6	+0.7
One Nation	Michael Mabood	478	1.7	+0.9
Independent	Tony Stokes	431	1.6	+1.6
Animal Justice	Colleen Saporita	353	1.3	+1.3
Libertarian	Anahita Ghassemifar	180	0.7	−0.6
Total formal votes		27,589	96.6	−0.6
Informal votes		962	3.4	+0.6
Turnout		28,551	90.5	+2.9
Two-party-preferred result
Labor	Kim Giddens	14,700	53.3	−3.4
Liberal	Nitin Vashisht	12,881	46.7	+3.4
Labor hold		Swing	−3.4	

Results are not final. Last updated on 25 March 2025 at 7:00 PM AWST

2021 Western Australian state election: Bateman
Party	Candidate	Votes	%	±%
Labor	Kim Giddens	12,106	45.8	+15.5
Liberal	Matt Woodall	9,762	37.0	−12.8
Greens	Adam Abdul Razak	1,815	6.9	−3.5
Independent	Steve Kepert	856	3.2	+3.2
Christians	Fiona McKenzie-Brown	774	2.9	−0.2
Liberal Democrats	Gregory Leech	341	1.3	+1.3
No Mandatory Vaccination	Christina Tseng	314	1.2	+1.2
Western Australia	Bill Koul	228	0.9	+0.1
One Nation	Barry Mason	213	0.8	−3.2
Total formal votes		26,409	97.2	+0.7
Informal votes		762	2.8	−0.7
Turnout		27,171	89.6	−1.3
Two-party-preferred result
Labor	Kim Giddens	14,963	56.7	+14.5
Liberal	Matt Woodall	11,436	43.3	−14.5
Labor gain from Liberal		Swing	+14.5	

=== Elections in the 2010s ===
2017 Western Australian state election: Bateman
Party	Candidate	Votes	%	±%
Liberal	Dean Nalder	11,515	51.0	−15.3
Labor	Tomas Fitzgerald	6,469	28.7	+9.9
Greens	Adie Wilmot	2,315	10.3	+1.4
One Nation	Michelle Meyers	1,032	4.6	+4.6
Christians	Don Huggins	698	3.1	+3.1
Micro Business	Jonathan Masih	334	1.5	+1.5
Matheson for WA	Adrian Arnold	206	0.9	+0.9
Total formal votes		22,569	96.6	+2.1
Informal votes		792	3.4	−2.1
Turnout		23,361	89.8	−1.6
Two-party-preferred result
Liberal	Dean Nalder	13,418	59.5	−13.7
Labor	Tomas Fitzgerald	9,148	40.5	+13.7
Liberal hold		Swing	−13.7	

2013 Western Australian state election: Bateman
Party	Candidate	Votes	%	±%
Liberal	Matt Taylor	12,697	64.1	+11.9
Labor	Rob Chasland	5,044	25.5	–4.1
Greens	Rebecca Leighton	2,081	10.5	–2.4
Total formal votes		19,822	93.2	−2.3
Informal votes		1,451	6.8	+2.3
Turnout		21,273	91.7	
Two-party-preferred result
Liberal	Matt Taylor	13,440	67.8	+8.4
Labor	Rob Chasland	6,372	32.2	–8.4
Liberal hold		Swing	+8.4	

=== Elections in the 2000s ===
2008 Western Australian state election: Bateman
Party	Candidate	Votes	%	±%
Liberal	Christian Porter	10,541	53.40	+5.1
Labor	Tony Stokes	5,538	28.05	−5.8
Greens	Andrea Callaghan	2,562	12.98	+6.0
Christian Democrats	Ka-ren Chew	750	3.80	+0.3
Independent	Won-Sik Choi	350	1.77	+1.77
Total formal votes		19,741	95.67	
Informal votes		893	4.33	
Turnout		20,634	89.59	
Two-party-preferred result^{[1]}
Liberal	Christian Porter	12,116	61.39	+4.5
Labor	Tony Stokes	7,620	38.61	−4.5
Liberal hold		Swing	+4.5	
