= Andrew Waddell =

Andrew Waddell may refer to:

- Andrew Waddell (referee) (born 1950), football referee
- Andrew Waddell (politician) (born 1966), Western Australian politician
