= 2017 Western Australian state election =

- 11 March 2017

All 59 seats in the Western Australian Legislative Assembly and all 36 members in the Western Australian Legislative Council 30 Assembly seats were needed for a majority
- Opinion polls
- Turnout: 1,593,228 (88.61%)
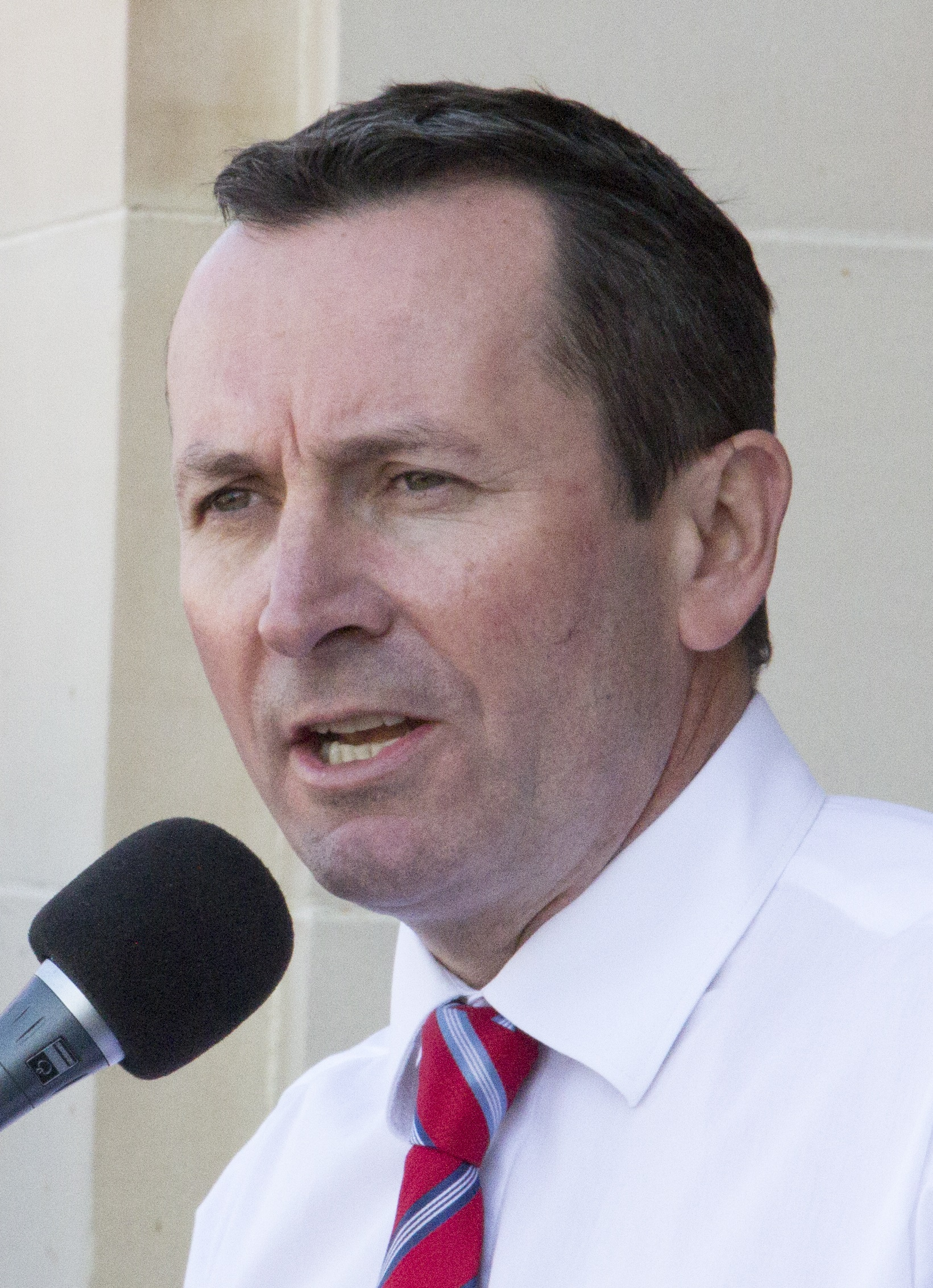

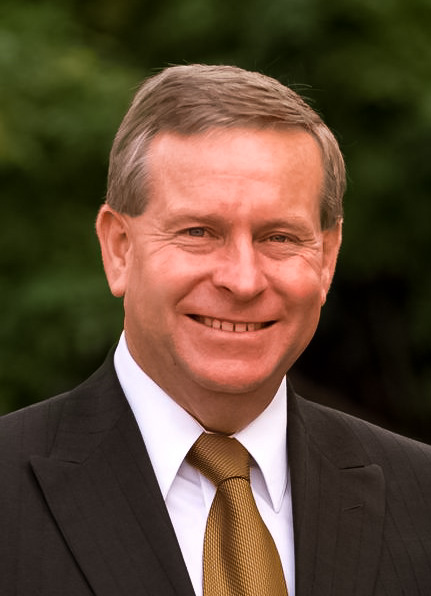

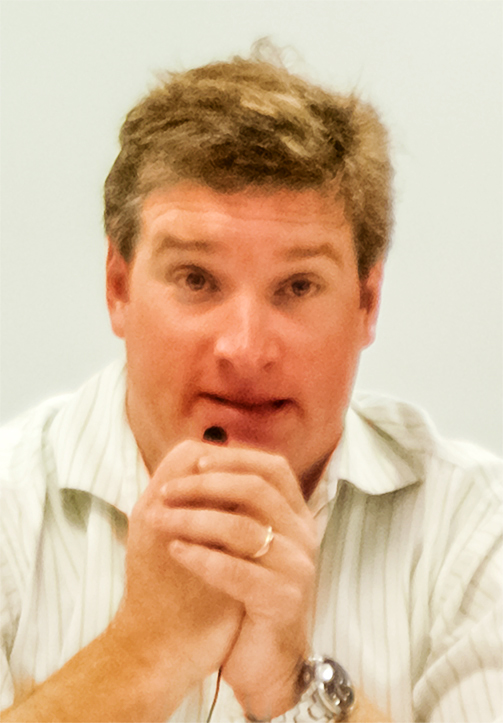
	First party	Second party	Third party
Leader	Mark McGowan	Colin Barnett	Brendon Grylls
Party	Labor	Liberal	National
Leader since	23 January 2012	6 August 2008	9 August 2016
Leader's seat	Rockingham	Cottesloe	Pilbara (lost seat)
Last election	21 seats	31 seats	7 seats
Seats won	41	13	5
Seat change	▲20	▼18	▼2
First preference vote	557,794	412,710	71,313
Percentage	42.20%	31.23%	5.40%
Swing	▲9.07	▼15.88	▼0.66
2PP	55.5%	44.5%
2PP swing	▲12.80	▼12.80
- The map on the left shows the first party preference by electorate. The map on the right shows the final two-party preferred vote result by electorate.
Premier before election
Colin Barnett
Liberal
Elected Premier
Mark McGowan
Labor

The 2017 Western Australian state election was held on Saturday 11 March 2017 to elect members to the Parliament of Western Australia, including all 59 seats in the Legislative Assembly and all 36 seats in the Legislative Council. The eight-and-a-half-year two-term incumbent Liberal–WA National government, led by Premier Colin Barnett, was defeated in a landslide by the Labor opposition, led by Opposition Leader Mark McGowan.

Labor won 41 of the 59 seats in the Legislative Assembly—a 12-seat supermajority. This was WA Labor's strongest performance in a state election at the time, and formed the largest majority government and seat tally in Western Australian parliamentary history until that point. Additionally, Labor exceeded all published opinion polling, winning 55.5 percent of the two-party-preferred vote from a state record landslide 12.8-point two-party swing. It was the worst defeat of a sitting government in Western Australia, as well as one of the worst defeats of a sitting state or territory government since Federation.

Labor also became the largest party in the Legislative Council with 14 of the 36 seats. The Labor government thus required at least five additional votes from non-government members to pass legislation.

== Results ==
=== Legislative Assembly ===
Government (41) Labor (41) Opposition (13) Liberal (13) Crossbench (5) National (5)

Legislative Assembly (IRV) – Turnout 86.90% (CV)
Party	Votes	%	Swing	Seats	+/–
Labor	557,794	42.20	▲9.07	41	▲20
Liberal	412,710	31.23	▼15.88	13	▼18
Greens	117,723	8.91	▲0.51	0	Steady
National	71,313	5.40	▼0.66	5	▼2
One Nation	65,192	4.93	New	0	Steady
Christians	27,724	2.10	▲0.29	0	Steady
Shooters, Fishers, Farmers	17,317	1.31	New	0	Steady
Micro Business	13,211	1.00	New	0	Steady
Matheson for WA	6,145	0.47	New	0	Steady
Animal Justice	2,836	0.21	New	0	Steady
Flux the System!	2,188	0.17	New	0	Steady
Family First	1,443	0.11	▼0.49	0	Steady
Socialist Alliance	694	0.05	New	0	Steady
Liberal Democrats	561	0.04	New	0	Steady
Independents	24,327	1.84	▼1.07	0	Steady
Other	462	0.04	New	0	Steady
Formal votes	1,321,640	95.46	▲1.46		
Informal votes	62,860	4.54	▼1.46		
Total	1,384,500			59	
Registered voters / turnout	1,593,222	86.90	▼2.31		
Two-party-preferred vote
Labor	733,738	55.5	▲12.8		
Liberal	587,353	44.5	▼12.8		

The four main media networks covering the election, the ABC, Sky News, Seven News and Nine News, all called the election for Labor within two hours after polls closed. McGowan succeeded Barnett to become the 30th Premier of Western Australia.

By the morning of 12 March, two thirds of votes had been counted and seven lower house seats were still in doubt, showing that Labor had won at least 36 seats, well above the 30 required for a majority, which the ABC predicted would increase to 41. Meanwhile, the Liberals and WA Nationals had won only 10 and five seats respectively, with a further three expected to be retained by the Liberals.

The swing against the government affected traditionally safe seats. Consequently, six government ministers lost their seats in the Legislative Assembly while one lost his seat in the Legislative Council.

The Labor landslide was built primarily on a near-sweep of Perth. Labor took 34 of the capital's 43 seats on a swing of 13.6 points, accounting for nearly all of its majority. By comparison, it had gone into the election holding 17 seats in Perth. According to the ABC's Antony Green, the 10 percent swing Labor needed to make McGowan premier was not nearly as daunting as it seemed on paper. Green noted that several Liberals in outer suburban seats sat on inflated margins. Additionally, Green argued that the one vote one value reforms of 2008, which allowed Perth to elect over 70 percent of the legislature, proved to be a boost for Labor in 2017. Green noted that when Labor last governed from 2001 to 2008, it did so in a legislature where voters in country seats had twice the voting power of voters in a Perth-based seat.

==== Seats changing parties ====
Seat	Pre-2017			Swing	Post-2017		
Seat	Party	Member	Margin	Swing	Margin	Member	Party
Balcatta	Liberal	Chris Hatton	7.1	12.9	5.8	David Michael	Labor
Belmont	Liberal	Glenys Godfrey	1.0	12.4	11.4	Cassie Rowe	Labor
Bicton	Liberal	Matt Taylor^{1}	10.0	13.0	2.9	Lisa O'Malley	Labor
Bunbury	Liberal	John Castrilli	12.2	23.0	10.8	Don Punch	Labor
Burns Beach	Liberal	Albert Jacob^{2}	11.3	13.9	2.5	Mark Folkard	Labor
Darling Range	Liberal	Tony Simpson	13.1	18.9	5.8	Barry Urban	Labor
Forrestfield	Liberal	Nathan Morton	2.2	11.6	9.4	Stephen Price	Labor
Jandakot	Liberal	Joe Francis	18.3	19.4	1.0	Yaz Mubarakai	Labor
Joondalup	Liberal	Jan Norberger	10.4	11.0	0.6	Emily Hamilton	Labor
Kalamunda	Liberal	John Day	10.3	12.7	2.5	Matthew Hughes	Labor
Kalgoorlie	National	Wendy Duncan	3.2	n/a	6.2	Kyran O'Donnell	Liberal
Kingsley	Liberal	Andrea Mitchell	14.0	14.7	0.7	Jessica Stojkovski	Labor
Morley	Liberal	Ian Britza	4.7	16.2	11.4	Amber-Jade Sanderson	Labor
Mount Lawley	Liberal	Michael Sutherland	8.9	12.9	4.0	Simon Millman	Labor
Murray-Wellington	Liberal	Murray Cowper	12.0	13.4	1.4	Robyn Clarke	Labor
Perth	Liberal	Eleni Evangel	2.8	14.6	11.8	John Carey	Labor
Pilbara	National	Brendon Grylls	11.5	13.8	2.3	Kevin Michel	Labor
Southern River	Liberal	Peter Abetz	10.9	18.8	7.9	Terry Healy	Labor
Swan Hills	Liberal	Frank Alban	3.7	18.3	14.5	Jessica Shaw	Labor
Wanneroo	Liberal	Paul Miles	11.0	18.2	7.3	Sabine Winton	Labor

^{1} Matt Taylor was the member for the seat of Bateman, but contested Bicton after losing preselection to Dean Nalder, the member for the abolished seat of Alfred Cove.
^{2} Albert Jacob was the member for the abolished seat of Ocean Reef, but instead contested Burns Beach, a seat containing much of the same territory.

- Members listed in italics did not contest their seat at this election.
- Labor also retained two seats—Collie-Preston and West Swan—which were notionally Liberal-held after the redistribution. The Liberals retained Hillarys, which was being contested by the incumbent MLA Rob Johnson as an independent.

=== Legislative Council ===
Government (14) Labor (14) Opposition (9) Liberal (9) Crossbench (13) National (4) Greens (4) One Nation (3) Shooters, Fishers, Farmers (1) Liberal Democrats (1)

Map of seats won for each party per electoral division.

Legislative Council (STV/GVT) – Turnout 87.00% (CV)
Party	Primary votes	%	Swing	Seats	+/-
Labor	544,938	40.41	▲7.90	14	▲3
Liberal	360,235	26.71	▼20.91	9	▼8
Greens	116,041	8.60	▲0.39	4	▲2
One Nation	110,480	8.19	New	3	▲3
National	59,776	4.43	▼0.45	4	▼1
Shooters, Fishers, Farmers	31,924	2.37	▲0.59	1	Steady
Christians	26,209	1.94	▼0.01	0	Steady
Liberal Democrats	23,848	1.77	New	1	▲1
Animal Justice	14,838	1.10	New	0	Steady
Family First	11,279	0.84	▼0.53	0	Steady
Daylight Saving	9,209	0.68	New	0	Steady
Micro Business	7,484	0.55	New	0	Steady
Flux the System!	5,934	0.44	New	0	Steady
Matheson for WA	5,270	0.39	New	0	Steady
Fluoride Free WA	4,327	0.32	New	0	Steady
Socialist Alliance	1,367	0.10	New	0	Steady
Independents	15,516	1.15	▼0.53	0	Steady
Other	482	0.03	New	0	Steady
Formal votes	1,348,675	97.29	▲0.13		
Informal votes	37,480	2.70	▼0.13		
Total	1,386,155			36	
Registered voters / turnout	1,593,222	87.00	▼2.20		

Labor became the largest party in the Legislative Council with 14 of the 36 seats. The Labor government will require at least five additional votes from non-government members to pass legislation.

On 4 April, the Western Australian Electoral Commission conducted a recount of 2013 election results to fill two casual vacancies for the remainder of the 2013–17 term caused by the resignation and subsequent election to the Legislative Assembly of Amber-Jade Sanderson (Labor) in East Metropolitan and Peter Katsambanis (Liberal) in North Metropolitan. The vacancies were filled by Bill Leadbetter (Labor) and Elise Irwin (Liberal), who will first sit in the Legislative Council on 11 May 2017.

== Date of election ==
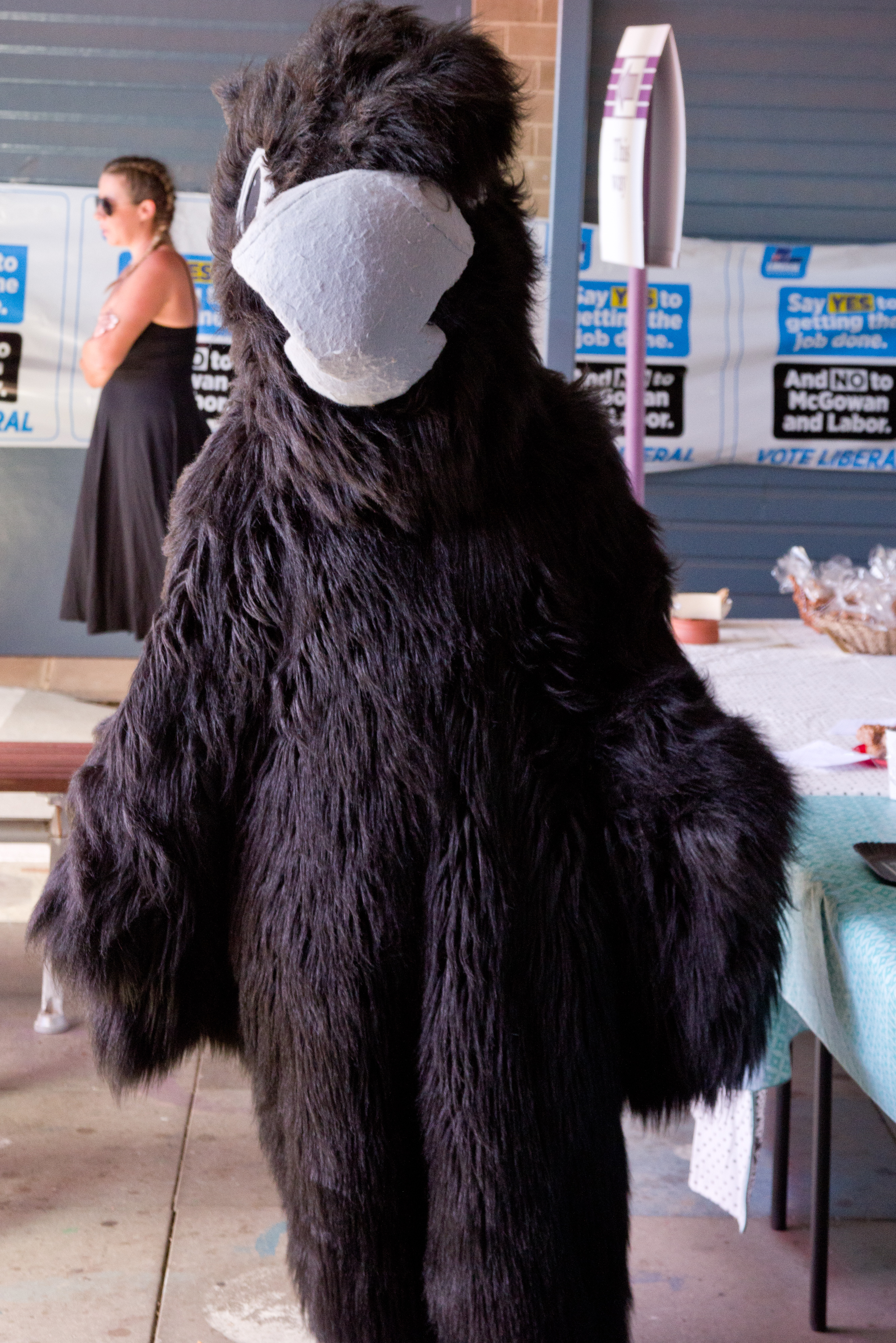
Barnaby C, protecting the Carnaby's black cockatoo habitat, and an anti-Roe 8 supporter, appeared at a number of media events during the election campaign

On 3 November 2011, the Government of Western Australia introduced fixed four-year terms for the Legislative Assembly, with the elections to be held on the second Saturday in March. The first election under the new law was the 2013 election. Previously, under electoral reforms of the Burke Government in 1987, four-year maximum terms were adopted for the Legislative Assembly, and fixed four-year terms for the Legislative Council.

== Campaign ==
The Western Australian National Party led by Brendon Grylls, who retook the leadership in August 2016, ran on a policy to increase the tax on every tonne mined from $0.25 to $5 for BHP and Rio Tinto. The big mining companies ran an advertising campaign against the policy, while a poll conducted found that 39.4% of voters surveyed supported the policy, 37.1% opposed and 23.5% were undecided.

The Liberal Party undertook a preference deal with One Nation during the elections, saying the party held less extreme views than it did in the 1990s. Some One Nation candidates were against the preference deal with the Liberal Party.

One Nation ran on opposing privatisation and the National party mining taxes.

== Seats held ==
=== Lower house ===
At the 2013 election, Labor won 21 seats, the Liberals won 31 seats and the Nationals won 7 seats. No seats were won by independents.

On 15 April 2016, the Liberal member for Hillarys, Rob Johnson, resigned from the Liberals to sit as an independent, leaving the government with 30 seats in the lower house.

=== Upper house ===
At the 2013 election, the Liberals won 17 seats, Labor won 11 seats, the Nationals won five seats, the Greens won two seats and the Shooters and Fishers won one seat.

Western Australia's Legislative Council was divided into six regions at the time. Three were based in Perth, while three were rural. Each region elected six members to the Legislative Council. These areas were not of similar population sizes, with rural areas having received from one and a half to about six times the effective membership of the metropolitan regions.

The Western Australian rural population dropped from about 12.1% to 10.7% of the state's enrolled electors after the 2008 election. Election analyst Antony Green predicted this would make it more difficult for the Liberals or Labor (who typically perform better in Perth than rural areas) to increase their presence within the Legislative Council.

== Redistribution ==
A redistribution of electoral boundaries for the lower house was completed on 27 November 2015. This resulted in a net gain of one seat for the Liberals from Labor. The Liberal seats of Alfred Cove, Eyre and Ocean Reef, the Labor seat of Gosnells and the National seat of Wagin were abolished. Five new seats were created (or re-created): the notionally Liberal seats of Bicton (mostly replacing Alfred Cove) and Burns Beach (mostly replacing Ocean Reef), the notionally Labor seats of Baldivis (created from parts of Kwinana and Warnbro) and Thornlie (replacing Gosnells), and the notionally National seat of Roe (merging Wagin and Eyre). The Labor seats of Collie-Preston and West Swan became notionally Liberal.

== Retiring MPs ==
Members who did not re-nominate at the 2017 election:

=== Liberal ===
- John Castrilli MLA (Bunbury) – announced 14 March 2016
- Kim Hames MLA (Dawesville) – announced 2 August 2014
- Liz Behjat MLC (North Metropolitan) – lost preselection
- Barry House MLC (South West) – announced 27 October 2015

=== National ===
- Wendy Duncan MLA (Kalgoorlie) – announced 4 December 2015
- Terry Waldron MLA (Wagin) – announced 25 November 2014

== Electoral pendulums ==
The following Mackerras pendulums work by lining up all of the seats according to the percentage point margin post-election on a two-candidate-preferred basis, grouped as marginal, safe etc. as defined by the Australian Electoral Commission.

=== Pre-election pendulum ===
This pendulum takes the redistribution into account. One sitting member, retiring Wagin Nationals MP Terry Waldron, does not appear in this pendulum: his seat was combined with Eyre to form Roe, a seat with a National margin that will also be contested by Eyre Liberal MP Graham Jacobs, who is listed as the defending member below. Two Liberal members, Dean Nalder (Alfred Cove, now renamed Bicton) and Matt Taylor (Bateman), were contesting each other's seats; this is reflected below. Retiring members are listed in italics.

Liberal/National seats
Marginal
West Swan	Rita Saffioti	LIB	0.9
Belmont	Glenys Godfrey	LIB	1.0
Forrestfield	Nathan Morton	LIB	2.2
Perth	Eleni Evangel	LIB	2.8
Collie-Preston	Mick Murray	LIB	2.9
Kalgoorlie	Wendy Duncan	NAT	3.2 v LIB
Swan Hills	Frank Alban	LIB	3.7
Morley	Ian Britza	LIB	4.7
Moore	Shane Love	NAT	5.9 v LIB
Fairly safe
Balcatta	Chris Hatton	LIB	7.1
Warren-Blackwood	Terry Redman	NAT	7.2 v LIB
Central Wheatbelt	Mia Davies	NAT	8.9 v LIB
Mount Lawley	Michael Sutherland	LIB	8.9
Safe
Bicton	Matt Taylor	LIB	10.0
Kalamunda	John Day	LIB	10.3
Joondalup	Jan Norberger	LIB	10.4
North West Central	Vince Catania	NAT	10.5 v LIB
Geraldton	Ian Blayney	LIB	10.9 v NAT
Southern River	Peter Abetz	LIB	10.9
Wanneroo	Paul Miles	LIB	11.0
Burns Beach	Albert Jacob	LIB	11.3
Pilbara	Brendon Grylls	NAT	11.5
Murray-Wellington	Murray Cowper	LIB	12.0
Bunbury	John Castrilli	LIB	12.2
Riverton	Mike Nahan	LIB	12.7
Dawesville	Kim Hames	LIB	12.7
Darling Range	Tony Simpson	LIB	13.1
Kingsley	Andrea Mitchell	LIB	14.0
Hillarys	Rob Johnson	LIB	16.0
Roe	Graham Jacobs	NAT	16.7 v LIB
Scarborough	Liza Harvey	LIB	17.3
Jandakot	Joe Francis	LIB	18.3
Carine	Tony Krsticevic	LIB	18.3
Nedlands	Bill Marmion	LIB	19.1
Very safe
Churchlands	Sean L'Estrange	LIB	20.0
South Perth	John McGrath	LIB	20.0
Cottesloe	Colin Barnett	LIB	21.1
Vasse	Libby Mettam	LIB	21.2
Bateman	Dean Nalder	LIB	23.1

Labor seats
Marginal
Midland	Michelle Roberts	ALP	0.5
Butler	John Quigley	ALP	1.0
Albany	Peter Watson	ALP	1.0
Thornlie	Chris Tallentire	ALP	1.8
Cannington	Bill Johnston	ALP	2.1
Willagee	Peter Tinley	ALP	2.5
Maylands	Lisa Baker	ALP	2.7
Girrawheen	Margaret Quirk	ALP	2.8
Victoria Park	Ben Wyatt	ALP	4.0
Kwinana	Roger Cook	ALP	4.3
Cockburn	Fran Logan	ALP	4.6
Mirrabooka	Janine Freeman	ALP	4.6
Bassendean	Dave Kelly	ALP	5.1
Kimberley	Josie Farrer	ALP	5.1
Fairly safe
Baldivis	new seat	ALP	6.4
Mandurah	David Templeman	ALP	7.7
Armadale	Tony Buti	ALP	9.6
Safe
Warnbro	Paul Papalia	ALP	10.6
Rockingham	Mark McGowan	ALP	13.2
Fremantle	Simone McGurk	ALP	15.4

=== Post-election pendulum ===
Government seats
Marginal
Joondalup	Emily Hamilton	ALP	0.6
Kingsley	Jessica Stojkovski	ALP	0.7
Jandakot	Yaz Mubarakai	ALP	1.0
Murray-Wellington	Robyn Clarke	ALP	1.4
Pilbara	Kevin Michel	ALP v NAT	2.3
Kalamunda	Matthew Hughes	ALP	2.5
Burns Beach	Mark Folkard	ALP	2.5
Bicton	Lisa O'Malley	ALP	2.9
Mount Lawley	Simon Millman	ALP	4.0
Albany	Peter Watson	ALP v NAT	5.1
Darling Range	Barry Urban	ALP	5.8
Balcatta	David Michael	ALP	5.8
Fairly safe
Baldivis	Reece Whitby	ALP v IND	7.2
Wanneroo	Sabine Winton	ALP	7.3
Southern River	Terry Healy	ALP	7.9
Forrestfield	Stephen Price	ALP	9.4
Safe
Bunbury	Don Punch	ALP	10.8
Belmont	Cassie Rowe	ALP	11.4
Morley	Amber-Jade Sanderson	ALP	11.4
Perth	John Carey	ALP	11.8
Kimberley	Josie Farrer	ALP	13.0
Midland	Michelle Roberts	ALP	13.0
Swan Hills	Jessica Shaw	ALP	14.5
Collie-Preston	Mick Murray	ALP	14.7
Willagee	Peter Tinley	ALP	15.5
Thornlie	Chris Tallentire	ALP	15.8
Cockburn	Fran Logan	ALP	15.9
Victoria Park	Ben Wyatt	ALP	16.5
Girrawheen	Margaret Quirk	ALP	16.7
West Swan	Rita Saffioti	ALP	17.1
Maylands	Lisa Baker	ALP	17.9
Mandurah	David Templeman	ALP	18.0
Cannington	Bill Johnston	ALP	18.1
Kwinana	Roger Cook	ALP	18.1
Mirrabooka	Janine Freeman	ALP	19.2
Butler	John Quigley	ALP	19.5
Bassendean	Dave Kelly	ALP	21.5
Fremantle	Simone McGurk	ALP	23.1
Rockingham	Mark McGowan	ALP	23.4
Warnbro	Paul Papalia	ALP	23.7
Armadale	Tony Buti	ALP	25.2

Non-government seats
Marginal
Dawesville	Zak Kirkup	LIB	0.7
Geraldton	Ian Blayney	LIB	1.3
Hillarys	Peter Katsambanis	LIB	4.1
Riverton	Mike Nahan	LIB	4.4
Scarborough	Liza Harvey	LIB	5.6
Fairly safe
Kalgoorlie	Kyran O'Donnell	LIB	6.2
South Perth	John McGrath	LIB	7.1
Nedlands	Bill Marmion	LIB	8.3
Carine	Tony Krsticevic	LIB	9.0
Bateman	Dean Nalder	LIB	9.5
Safe
Churchlands	Sean L'Estrange	LIB	13.2
Cottesloe	Colin Barnett	LIB	13.3
Vasse	Libby Mettam	LIB	14.7
Crossbench seats
North West Central	Vince Catania	NAT v ALP	9.5
Warren-Blackwood	Terry Redman	NAT v ALP	13.4
Moore	Shane Love	NAT v LIB	13.9
Roe	Peter Rundle	NAT v LIB	14.4
Central Wheatbelt	Mia Davies	NAT v ALP	22.6

== Opinion polling ==
=== Graphical summary ===
Primary vote

Two-party-preferred vote

Aggregate data of all voting intention polling since the 2013 Western Australian state election. Local regression trends for each party are shown as solid lines.

=== Voting intention ===
Legislative Assembly (lower house) polling
Date	Firm	Primary vote					TPP vote
Date	Firm	LIB	NAT	ALP	GRN	OTH	LIB	ALP
11 March 2017	Galaxy (Exit Poll)	33%	6%	41%	6%	14%	45.5%	54.5%
9 March 2017	ReachTEL	33.9%	6.0%	41.8%	6.5%	11.8%	46%	54%
6–9 March 2017	Newspoll	32%	5%	41%	7%	15%	46%	54%
1–3 March 2017	Galaxy	31%	5%	40%	8%	16%	46%	54%
27 February 2017	ReachTEL	34.6%	6.8%	35.2%	10.7%	12.7%	48%	52%
February 2017	ReachTEL	35.4%	8.4%	35%	6%	15.1%	50%	50%
January 2017	Newspoll	30%	5%	38%	9%	18%	46%	54%
November 2016	Newspoll	34%	6%	41%	9%	10%	48%	52%
October 2016	ReachTEL	35.9%	6.1%	36.7%	7.7%	13.6%	48%	52%
October 2016	Roy Morgan	34%	5%	36.5%	12.5%	12%	47.5%	52.5%
August 2016	Roy Morgan	34.5%	6.5%	35.5%	12.5%	11%	49%	51%
May 2016	Roy Morgan	36.5%	7%	34%	12.5%	10%	51%	49%
Mar–May 2016	Newspoll	40%		42%	11%	7%	46%	54%
March 2016	Roy Morgan	33.5%	8%	37%	14.5%	7%	48%	52%
Mar 2016	ReachTEL	37%	5%	39%	13%	5%	44%	56%
Oct–Dec 2015	Newspoll	37%	5%	42%	10%	6%	47%	53%
9–15 Oct 2015	Morgan	37.5%	4.5%	32%	13%	13%	51.5%	48.5%
28–31 Aug 2015	Morgan	35%	7%	34%	15%	9%	50%	50%
Apr–Jun 2015	Newspoll	33%	7%	33%	14%	13%	48%	52%
Jan–Mar 2015	Newspoll	34%	6%	35%	14%	11%	48%	52%
Oct–Dec 2014	Newspoll	34%	8%	33%	15%	10%	50%	50%
Jul–Sep 2014	Newspoll	35%	6%	31%	15%	13%	50%	50%
Apr–Jun 2014	Newspoll	34%	6%	27%	17%	16%	50%	50%
Oct–Dec 2013	Newspoll	36%	8%	33%	13%	10%	51%	49%
2013 election		47.1%	6.1%	33.1%	8.4%	5.3%	57.3%	42.7%
4–7 Mar 2013	Newspoll	48%	6%	32%	8%	6%	59.5%	40.5%

Better premier polling^
	Liberal Barnett	Labor McGowan
6–9 Mar 2017	37%	45%
Oct 2016	29%	47%
Oct 2016	41%	59%
Sep 2016 (RM)	43%	57%
Mar–May 2016	32%	46%
Mar 2016 (RT)	39%	61%
Oct–Dec 2015	36%	41%
Apr–Jun 2015	37%	43%
Jan–Mar 2015	38%	44%
Oct–Dec 2014	39%	40%
Jul–Sep 2014	38%	41%
Apr–Jun 2014	36%	43%
Oct–Dec 2013	37%	43%
2013 election	–	–
4–7 Mar 2013	52%	31%
Polling conducted by Roy Morgan Research (RM), ReachTEL (RT), or Newspoll (all others).^ Remainder were "uncommitted" to either leader.

Satisfaction polling^
	Barnett		McGowan
	Satisfied	Dissatisfied	Satisfied	Dissatisfied
6–9 Mar 2017	34%	57%	45%	40%
Nov 2016	28%	61%	46%	33%
Mar–May 2016	31%	58%	51%	28%
Oct–Dec 2015	33%	54%	47%	32%
Apr–Jun 2015	36%	57%	49%	33%
Jan–Mar 2015	38%	53%	53%	28%
Oct–Dec 2014	37%	49%	48%	27%
Jul–Sep 2014	32%	56%	47%	29%
Apr–Jun 2014	34%	56%	49%	31%
Oct–Dec 2013	34%	54%	51%	22%
2013 election	–	–	–	–
4–7 Mar 2013	51%	36%	49%	29%
Polling conducted by Newspoll and published in The Australian.^Remainder were "uncommitted" to either leader.

== Newspaper endorsements ==
Newspaper	Endorsement
The Australian	Liberal
The Australian Financial Review	
The Sunday Times	Labor
The West Australian	Labor

== See also ==
- Candidates of the 2017 Western Australian state election
- Members of the Western Australian Legislative Assembly, 2017–2021
- Members of the Western Australian Legislative Council, 2017–2021
