= Speaker of the Western Australian Legislative Assembly =

Presiding officer in the Legislative Assembly of Western Australia

- Incumbent; Stephen Price since 8 April 2025
- Style: The Honourable; Madam/Mr Speaker (within the Assembly)
- Appointer: The Monarch's representative at the behest of the Legislative Assembly
- Term length: Elected at start of each Parliament
- Inaugural holder: Sir James George Lee-Steere
- Formation: 30 December 1890
- Deputy: Ali Kent
- Website: www.parliament.wa.gov.au

The Speaker of the Western Australian Legislative Assembly is the presiding officer in the Legislative Assembly. The office has existed since the creation of the Legislative Assembly in 1890 under the Constitution Act 1889. The 32nd and current Speaker is Labor MLA Stephen Price, who has held the role since the 2025 state election.

== The role of the Speaker ==
The Speaker is elected to the position by a ballot of the members of the Legislative Assembly from among its members after being nominated by the Premier of Western Australia. It is generally a partisan position; the governing party almost always installs one of its members in the position. As with the other states and territories, the Speaker continues to attend party meetings and stands at general elections as a party candidate, if they are indeed a member of a party. There is no convention that the Speaker should be unopposed for reelection.

On the other hand, the Speaker is not a political figure like those in the United States. The Speaker does not take part in debates in the House, does not vote in the House except in the (rare) event of a tied vote, and does not speak in public on party-political issues (except at election time in his or her own constituency).

The Speaker's principal duty is to preside over the Assembly. The occupant of the chair must maintain order in the House, uphold the Standing Orders (rules of procedure) and protect the rights of backbench members. The Speaker is expected to conduct the business of the House in an impartial manner, and generally does so. The Speaker is assisted by a member-elected Deputy Speaker, who is usually also of the governing party.

== List of speakers of the Western Australian Legislative Assembly ==
| Order | Speaker | Party | Term begin | Term end | Term of office | Notes |
|---|---|---|---|---|---|---|
| 1 | Sir James George Lee-Steere | Ministerial | 30 December 1890 | 30 November 1903 | 12 years, 335 days | ^{1} |
| 2 | Charles Harper | Opposition | 2 December 1903 | 27 July 1904 | 238 days | ^{1} |
| 3 | Mathieson Jacoby | Independent | 28 July 1904 | 27 October 1905 | 1 year, 91 days | ^{1} |
| 4 | Timothy Quinlan | Ministerial | 23 November 1905 | 8 October 1911 | 5 years, 319 days | ^{1} |
| 5 | Frank Troy | Labor | 1 November 1911 | 13 February 1917 | 5 years, 104 days | |
| 6 | Edward Bertram Johnston | Country | 13 February 1917 | 1 March 1917 | 16 days | |
| 7 | James Gardiner | Country | 1 March 1917 | 28 June 1917 | 119 days | |
| 8 | George Taylor | National Labor | 19 July 1917 | 23 July 1924 | 7 years, 4 days | |
| 9 | Thomas Walker | Labor | 24 July 1924 | 29 July 1930 | 6 years, 5 days | |
| 10 | Sydney Stubbs | Country | 30 July 1930 | 17 July 1933 | 2 years, 352 days | |
| 11 | Alexander Panton | Labor | 18 July 1933 | 24 March 1938 | 4 years, 249 days | |
| 12 | William Johnson | Labor | 4 August 1938 | 2 August 1939 | 363 days | |
| 13 | Joseph Sleeman | Labor | 3 August 1939 | 31 July 1947 | 7 years, 362 days | |
| 14 | Charles North | Liberal | 31 July 1947 | 5 August 1953 | 6 years, 5 days | |
| 15 | Aloysius Rodoreda | Labor | 6 August 1953 | 1 August 1956 | 2 years, 361 days | |
| 16 | James Hegney | Labor | 2 August 1956 | 29 June 1959 | 2 years, 331 days | |
| 17 | John Hearman | Liberal | 30 June 1959 | 23 March 1968 | 8 years, 267 days | |
| 18 | Hugh Guthrie | Liberal | 25 July 1968 | 20 February 1971 | 2 years, 210 days | |
| 19 | Merv Toms | Labor | 15 July 1971 | 8 October 1971 | 85 days | |
| 20 | Daniel Norton | Labor | 16 November 1971 | 30 March 1974 | 2 years, 134 days | |
| 21 | Sir Ross Hutchinson | Liberal | 22 May 1974 | 19 February 1977 | 2 years, 273 days | |
| 22 | Ian Thompson | Liberal | 24 May 1977 | 21 March 1983 | 5 years, 301 days | |
| 23 | John Harman | Labor | 22 March 1983 | 8 February 1986 | 2 years, 262 days | |
| 24 | Mike Barnett | Labor | 10 June 1986 | 17 June 1993 | 7 years, 7 days | |
| 25 | Jim Clarko | Liberal | 17 June 1993 | 14 December 1996 | 3 years, 180 days | |
| 26 | George Strickland | Liberal | 6 March 1997 | 10 February 2001 | 3 years, 341 days | |
| 27 | Fred Riebeling | Labor | 1 May 2001 | 6 September 2008 | 7 years, 128 days | |
| 28 | Grant Woodhams | Nationals | 6 November 2008 | 9 March 2013 | 4 years, 123 days | |
| 29 | Michael Sutherland | Liberal | 11 April 2013 | 11 March 2017 | 3 years, 334 days | |
| 30 | Peter Watson | Labor | 11 May 2017 | 29 April 2021 | 3 years, 353 days | |
| 31 | Michelle Roberts | Labor | 29 April 2021 | 8 April 2025 | 3 years, 344 days | |
| 32 | Stephen Price | Labor | 8 April 2025 | Incumbent | 1 year, 153 days | |

1. Members of the Legislative Assembly were not officially associated with organised parties until 1904.

== See also ==
- President of the Western Australian Legislative Council
