= Stephen Price (Australian politician) =

Australian politician

Stephen Price MLA

32nd Speaker of the Western Australian Legislative Assembly
- Incumbent
- Assumed office 8 April 2025
- Preceded by: Michelle Roberts

Member of the Western Australian Legislative Assembly for Forrestfield
- Incumbent
- Assumed office 11 March 2017
- Preceded by: Nathan Morton

Personal details
- Born: 5 October 1969 (age 56) Bunbury, Western Australia
- Party: Australian Labor Party
- Website: www.stephenpricemla.com.au

Stephen James Price (born 5 October 1969) is an Australian politician. He has been an Australian Labor Party member of the Western Australian Legislative Assembly since the 2017 state election, representing Forrestfield.

Price worked as a gold miner and as a union official with the Australian Workers' Union before entering politics.

Price was re-elected in the 2025 Western Australian state election.

Price was elected the 32nd Speaker of the Western Australian Legislative Assembly.

Western Australian Legislative Assembly
| Preceded by Nathan Morton | Member for Forrestfield; 2017–present | Incumbent |
| Preceded by Michelle Roberts | Speaker of the Western Australian Legislative Assembly; 2025–present | Incumbent |
