= Electoral district of Forrestfield =

State electoral district in Perth, Western Australia

Forrestfield Western Australia—Legislative Assembly
- Interactive map of electoral district boundaries from the 2025 state election
- State: Western Australia
- Dates current: 2008–present
- MP: Stephen Price
- Party: Labor
- Namesake: Forrestfield
- Electors: 32,923 (2025)
- Area: 59 km^{2} (22.8 sq mi)
- Demographic: Metropolitan
- Coordinates: 31.96°S 116.02°E
Electorates around Forrestfield:
Belmont	Midland	Midland
Belmont	Forrestfield	Kalamunda
Cannington	Thornlie	Kalamunda

Forrestfield is an electoral district of the Legislative Assembly in the Australian state of Western Australia, based in the eastern suburbs of Perth.

== Geography ==
Based in the eastern suburbs of Perth, the district has a north–south elongation covering three separate built up areas. In the north, the district takes in the suburbs of High Wycombe, Maida Vale and a small part of Gooseberry Hill; in the middle it covers most of Forrestfield, Wattle Grove and part of Kewdale; whilst to the south is the suburb of Kenwick plus part of Maddington and Orange Grove.

== History ==
Forrestfield was first contested at the 2008 state election. It was a new seat created as a result of the one vote one value reforms. A plurality of the new district's voters came from the district of Darling Range, which was radically redrawn. The northernmost part of the electorate was constructed from parts of Belmont and Midland, whilst the voters in the southern part of the district were drawn in from Kenwick.

== Members for Forrestfield ==
Member	Party	Term
Andrew Waddell	Labor	2008–2013
Nathan Morton	Liberal	2013–2017
Stephen Price	Labor	2017–present

== Election results ==
2025 Western Australian state election: Forrestfield
Party	Candidate	Votes	%	±%
Labor	Stephen Price	11,241	41.3	−24.3
Liberal	George Tilbury	8,894	32.7	+10.9
Greens	River Clarke	2,496	9.2	+4.2
One Nation	Peter Nicholls	1,283	4.7	+2.6
National	Ian Blayney	1,078	4.0	+4.0
Legalise Cannabis	Steve Emmons	969	3.6	+3.6
Christians	Jacob Morrow	839	3.1	+0.5
Shooters, Fishers, Farmers	Chris D. Munro	407	1.5	+1.5
Total formal votes		27,207	95.5	−0.7
Informal votes		1,286	4.5	+0.7
Turnout		28,493	86.5	+2.2
Two-party-preferred result
Labor	Stephen Price	14,707	54.1	−18.8
Liberal	George Tilbury	12,479	45.9	+18.8
Labor hold		Swing	−18.8	
