= Lisa Baker (Australian politician) =

Australian politician (born 1958)

Member of the Western Australian Legislative Assembly for Maylands
- In office 6 September 2008 – 5 February 2025
- Preceded by: Judy Edwards
- Succeeded by: Dan Bull

Personal details
- Born: 26 August 1958 (age 68) Perth, Western Australia
- Party: Labor
- Education: WAIT
- Website: maylands.walabor.org.au

Lisa Loraine Baker (born 26 August 1958) is an Australian politician who was a Labor Party member of the Legislative Assembly of Western Australia from 2008 to 2025, representing the seat of Maylands.

Baker was born in Perth. She attended Perth College, Mercedes College, and Governor Stirling Senior High School at various points, and then went on to the Western Australian Institute of Technology (now Curtin University), graduating with an initial degree in psychology and then a graduate diploma in development studies. During the 1990s, Baker was employed by the National Native Title Tribunal as director of its business services division. In 2002, she became the CEO of the Western Australian Council of Social Service (WACOSS), a peak organisation for the social services sector in Western Australia.

From 1998 to 2001, Baker also served on the Mundaring Shire Council. In 2008, she was preselected as the Labor candidate for Maylands, a safe seat. She subsequently entered parliament at the 2008 state election, replacing the retiring Judy Edwards. Her majority was reduced at the 2013 election (as part of a statewide swing against Labor), turning Maylands into a marginal seat. Baker is openly gay, and owns a 20-acre property on the outskirts of Perth.

Baker was appointed Deputy Speaker of the Legislative Assembly on 11 May 2017.

In March 2024, Baker announced her retirement from politics at the 2025 state election. She was succeeded by Labor candidate Dan Bull.

Western Australian Legislative Assembly
Preceded by Judy Edwards	Member for Maylands; 2008–2025	Succeeded by Dan Bull
