= Michelle Roberts =

Australian politician

The Honourable Michelle Roberts MLA

31st Speaker of the Western Australian Legislative Assembly
- In office 29 April 2021 – 8 March 2025
- Preceded by: Peter Watson
- Succeeded by: Stephen Price

Member of the Legislative Assembly of Western Australia
- In office 14 December 1996 – 8 March 2025
- Preceded by: None (new seat)
- Succeeded by: Steve Catania
- Constituency: Midland
- In office 19 March 1994 – 14 December 1996
- Preceded by: Carmen Lawrence
- Succeeded by: None (abolished)
- Constituency: Glendalough

Personal details
- Born: Michelle Hopkins Thomas; 29 February 1960 (age 66) Perth, Western Australia
- Party: Labor
- Education: University of Western Australia

Michelle Hopkins Roberts (née Thomas; born 29 February 1960) is an Australian politician who served as Speaker of the Western Australian Legislative Assembly from 2021 to 2025. She was a Labor Party member of the Legislative Assembly from 1994 to 2025. She served as a minister in the governments of Geoff Gallop and Alan Carpenter between 2001 and 2008. In November 2015, Roberts became the longest-serving female parliamentarian in Western Australia's history, breaking the record set by Liz Constable. She was a high school teacher, civil servant and local government councillor before entering politics.

== Early life ==
Roberts was born in Perth, Western Australia, to Frances (née Hopkins) and William Thomas. Her uncle, Chas Hopkins, served as Lord Mayor of Perth. Roberts completed her secondary education at Mercedes College and then went on to the University of Western Australia, graduating with a Bachelor of Arts degree followed by a diploma in education. She taught at John Curtin Senior High School from 1983 until 1987. Roberts left teaching in 1987 to work for the Department of Parliamentary Services, where she stayed until 1989. She then spent periods as a policy officer for the Departments of Local Government (1989 to 1991) and Occupational Health, Safety and Welfare (1993 to 1994), as well as serving as a board member of the East Perth Redevelopment Authority from 1991 to 1993.

== Politics ==
=== Early years ===
Roberts joined the Labor Party in 1978, and has served as a party official at both state and federal level. She was elected to the Perth City Council in 1986 and served as a councillor until 1993, including as deputy lord mayor to Reg Withers from 1992. Roberts first ran for parliament at the 1993 state election, standing unsuccessfully for the Legislative Council in fourth place on Labor's ticket in the East Metropolitan Region. She entered the Legislative Assembly the following year, winning the 1994 Glendalough by-election (caused by the resignation of former premier Carmen Lawrence). Roberts was included in the shadow ministry of Ian Taylor a few months after her election, and remained a shadow minister under Jim McGinty and Geoff Gallop. She transferred to the seat of Midland at the 1996 state election, following the elimination of Glendalough in a redistribution.

=== 2001–2008: cabinet minister ===
After Labor's victory at the 2001 state election, Roberts was appointed Minister for Police, Minister for Emergency Services, and Minister for Local Government. She lost the local government portfolio to Tom Stephens in a reshuffle in July 2001, at which point her other two portfolios were merged. In June 2003, Roberts was also made Minister for Justice and Minister for Community Safety. She lost the justice portfolio to John D'Orazio in a reshuffle after the 2005 state election.

When Geoff Gallop resigned as premier and leader of the Labor Party in January 2006, Roberts was one of three candidates to replace him, along with Alan Carpenter and Jim McGinty. Both she and McGinty withdrew their candidacies before a formal vote was held. In the new ministry, Roberts became Minister for Housing and Works, Minister for Consumer Protection, Minister for Heritage, and Minister for Land Information. She was additionally made Minister for Indigenous Affairs in December 2006, although she lost the consumer protection portfolio. In March 2007, Roberts was also made Minister for Employment Protection, serving in that role until being replaced by Jon Ford in February 2008. She held her remaining portfolios until Labor's defeat at the 2008 state election.

=== 2008–2017: shadow cabinet ===
After the 2008 election, Roberts was retained in the shadow cabinet of the new Labor leader, Eric Ripper. She was initially given the education portfolio, but in February 2011 was promoted to shadow treasurer, replacing Ben Wyatt (who had unsuccessfully challenged for the leadership). When Mark McGowan succeeded Ripper as leader in January 2012, Wyatt returned as shadow treasurer and Roberts was instead made shadow police minister. She came close to losing her seat at the 2013 state election, eventually winning Midland by just 24 votes on the two-party-preferred count. This was a negative swing of 8.3 points from the 2008 election.

=== 2017–2021: cabinet minister ===
Labor regained government at the 2017 state election, winning the largest majority government in the state's history at the time. Roberts herself saw off her 2013 opponent, Daniel Parasiliti, with somewhat less difficulty, picking up a swing of over 12 percent to turn Midland into a safe Labor seat at one stroke. She was appointed as Minister for Police and Minister for Road Safety in McGowan's government.

With former Premier Colin Barnett's retirement from politics in 2018, Roberts became the Mother of the Western Australian Legislative Assembly as its longest-serving member.

=== 2021–2025: Speaker of the Legislative Assembly ===
After Labor was re-elected with an even larger majority in 2021, Roberts was elected as Speaker of the Legislative Assembly, the first woman to hold the post. Her ascension to the post came as a record 28 women were elected to the Legislative Assembly. In her first address as Speaker, Roberts said that she took up the post 100 years after Edith Cowan became the first woman elected to a legislature at any level in Australia. "This is a clear signal to the community and to women of just how far we've come," she said, "but it has taken over a century to do it."

She stood down at the 2025 Western Australian state election. She was succeeded by Labor candidate Steve Catania.

Western Australian Legislative Assembly
Preceded by Carmen Lawrence	Member for Glendalough; 1994–1996	Abolished
New seat	Member for Midland; 1996–2025	Succeeded by Steve Catania
Preceded by Peter Watson	Speaker of the Western Australian Legislative Assembly; 2021–2025	Succeeded by Stephen Price
Preceded by Paul Omodei	Minister for Local Government; 2001	Succeeded by Tom Stephens
Preceded by Kevin Prince	Minister for Police and Emergency Services; 2001–2006	Succeeded by John D'Orazio
Preceded by Jim McGinty	Minister for Justice; 2003–2005	Succeeded by John D'Orazio
New creation	Minister for Community Safety; 2003–2006	Succeeded by John D'Orazio
Preceded by John Kobelke	Minister for Consumer Protection; 2006	Succeeded by Sheila McHale
Preceded by Fran Logan	Minister for Housing and Works; 2006–2008	Succeeded by Troy Buswell
Preceded by Fran Logan	Minister for Heritage; 2006–2008	Succeeded by John Castrilli
Preceded by John Bowler	Minister for Land Information; 2006–2008	Succeeded by Brendon Grylls
Preceded by Sheila McHale	Minister for Indigenous Affairs; 2006–2008	Succeeded by Kim Hames
Preceded by John Bowler	Minister for Employment Protection; 2007–2008	Succeeded by Jon Ford
Preceded by Liza Harvey	Minister for Police; 2017–2021	Succeeded by Paul Papalia
Preceded by Liza Harvey	Minister for Road Safety; 2017–2021	Succeeded by Paul Papalia
