= 2013 Western Australian state election =

- 9 March 2013

All 59 seats in the Western Australian Legislative Assembly and all 36 members in the Western Australian Legislative Council 30 Assembly seats were needed for a majority
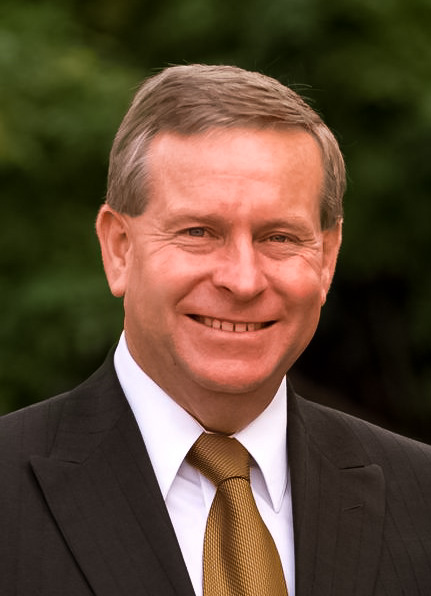

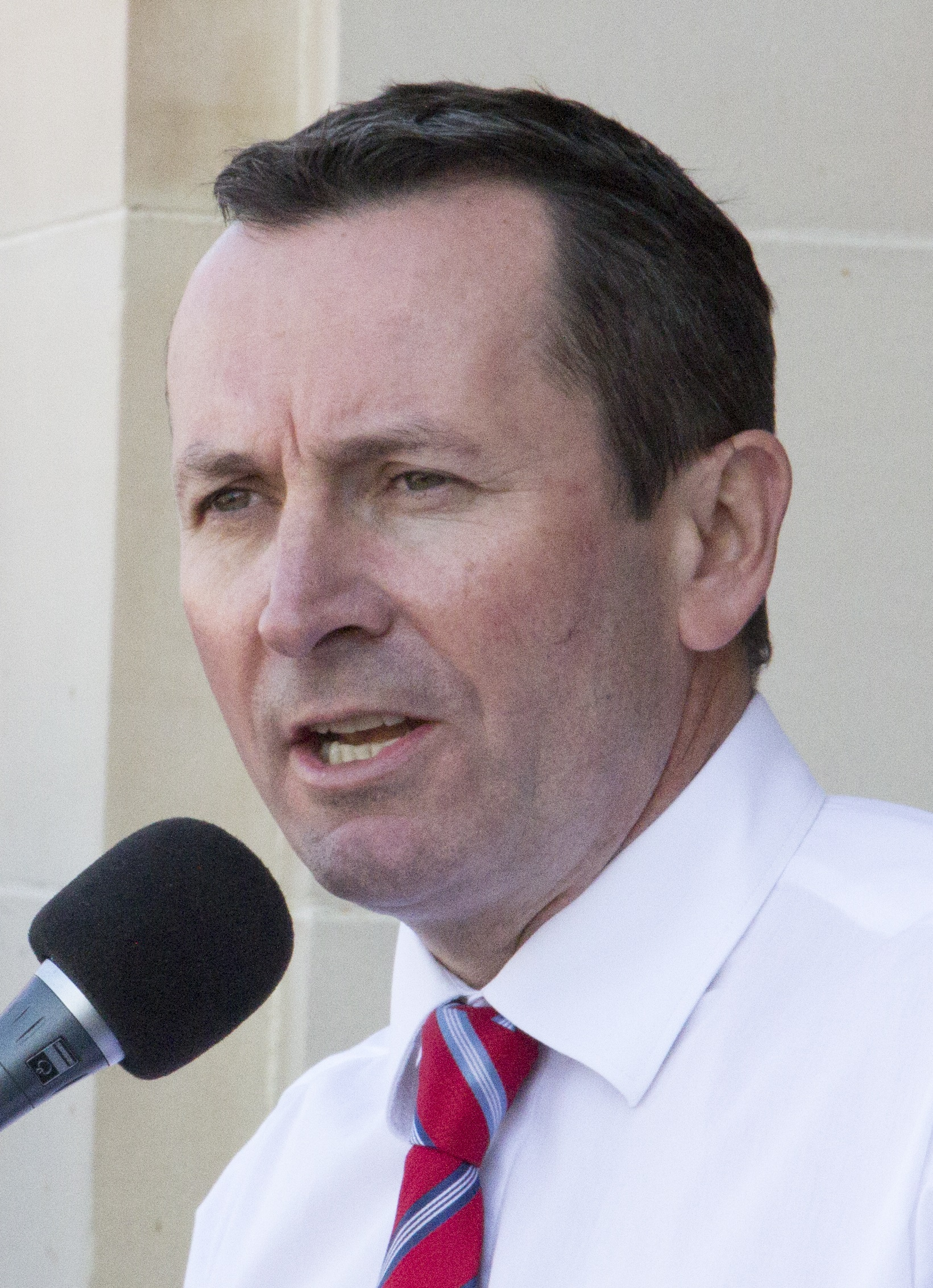

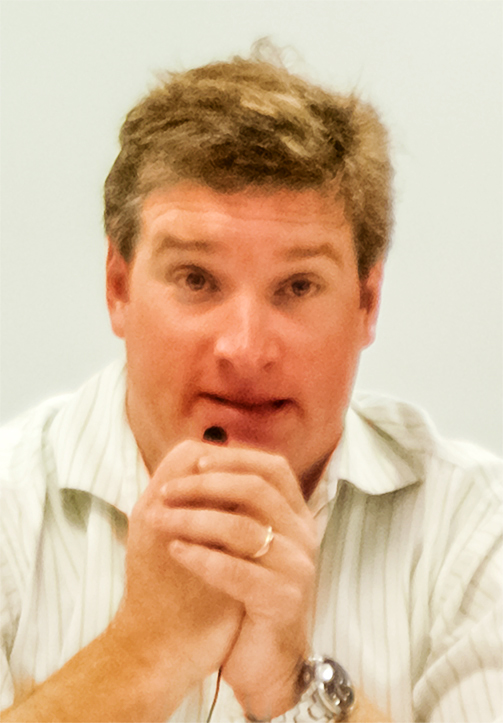
	First party	Second party	Third party
Leader	Colin Barnett	Mark McGowan	Brendon Grylls
Party	Liberal	Labor	National
Leader since	6 August 2008	23 January 2012	21 June 2005
Leader's seat	Cottesloe	Rockingham	Central Wheatbelt (won Pilbara)
Last election	24 seats	28 seats	4 seats
Seats before	24	26	5
Seats won	31	21	7
Seat change	▲7	▼5	▲2
First preference vote	557,903	392,448	71,694
Percentage	47.10%	33.13%	6.05%
Swing	▲8.71	▼2.70	▲1.18
TPP	57.29%	42.71%
TPP swing	▲5.44	▼5.44
- The map on the left shows the first party preference by electorate. The map on the right shows the final two-party preferred vote result by electorate.
Premier before election
Colin Barnett
Liberal
Elected Premier
Colin Barnett
Liberal

The 2013 Western Australian state election was held on Saturday 9 March 2013 to elect 59 members to the Legislative Assembly and 36 members to the Legislative Council.

The incumbent Liberal–National Coalition government, led by Premier Colin Barnett, won a second consecutive four-year term in government, defeating the Labor Party, led by Opposition Leader Mark McGowan, in a landslide. The Liberals alone won a majority of seats in the Legislative Assembly for the first time since the election of 1996, retaining government with 31 seats. Labor won 21 seats and the Nationals won 7 seats. In the Legislative Council, the Liberals won 17 of the 36 seats.

== Results ==
=== Legislative Assembly ===
Winning party by electorate.

Western Australian state election, 9 March 2013 Legislative Assembly << 2008–2017 >>
Enrolled voters	1,412,533				
Votes cast	1,260,089		Turnout	89.21%	+2.73%
Informal votes	75,657		Informal	6.00%	+0.68%
Summary of votes by party
Party	Primary votes	%	Swing	Seats	Change
Liberal	557,903	47.10	▲+8.71	31	+7
Labor	392,448	33.13	▼–2.70	21	–7
Greens	99,431	8.39	▼–3.52	0	±0
National	71,694	6.05	▲+1.18	7	+3
Christians	21,451	1.81	▼–0.77	0	±0
Family First	7,039	0.59	▼–1.35	0	±0
Independents	34,466	2.91	▼–1.44	0	–3
Total	1,184,432			59	
Two-party-preferred
Liberal	678,231	57.29%	▲+5.44%		
Labor	505,650	42.71%	▼–5.44%		

=== Legislative Council ===
Legislative Council results per region in the 2013 state general election

Western Australian state election, 9 March 2013 Legislative Council
Enrolled voters	1,412,533				
Votes cast	1,260,929		Turnout	89.27%	+2.72%
Informal votes	35,706		Informal	2.83%	+0.00%
Summary of votes by party
Party	Primary votes	%	Swing	Seats	Change
Liberal	583,500	47.62	▲+8.02	17	+1
Labor	398,260	32.51	▼–3.63	11	± 0
Greens	100,624	8.21	▼–2.87	2	–2
National	59,804	4.88	▼–0.44	5	± 0
Christians	23,877	1.95	▼–0.37	0	± 0
Shooters and Fishers	21,765	1.78	New	1	+1
Family First	16,760	1.37	▼–1.15	0	± 0
Independent	20,633	1.68	▲+0.21	0	± 0
Total	1,225,223			36	

== Summary of Assembly results ==
Popular vote
Liberal	47.10%
Labor	33.13%
Greens	8.40%
National	6.05%
Others	5.32%

% of the seats won
Liberal	52.54%
Labor	35.59%
National	11.86%

== Seats changing parties ==
Seat	Pre-2013			Swing	Post-2013		
Seat	Party	Member	Margin	Swing	Margin	Member	Party
Alfred Cove	Independent Liberal	Janet Woollard	0.2*	N/A	23.6**	Dean Nalder	Liberal
Balcatta	Labor	John Kobelke	2.2	9.5	7.3	Chris Hatton	Liberal
Belmont	Labor	Eric Ripper	6.7	7.6	0.9	Glenys Godfrey	Liberal
Churchlands	Independent	Liz Constable	23.5**	N/A	20.2**	Sean L'Estrange	Liberal
Forrestfield	Labor	Andrew Waddell	0.2	2.3	2.1	Nathan Morton	Liberal
Fremantle	Independent	Adele Carles	4.0**	N/A	7.9*	Simone McGurk	Labor
Joondalup	Labor	Tony O'Gorman	3.3	7.8	4.5	Jan Norberger	Liberal
Kalgoorlie	Independent	John Bowler	3.6***	N/A	6.3*	Wendy Duncan	National
Morley	Labor	notional	0.8	5.5	4.7	Ian Britza	Liberal
Perth	Labor	John Hyde	7.7	10.3	2.6	Eleni Evangel	Liberal
Pilbara	Labor	Tom Stephens	7.2	18.7	11.5	Brendon Grylls	National

- Members listed in italics did not contest their seat at this election.
- * figure is vs. Liberal
- ** figure is vs. Labor
- *** figure is vs. National

== Background ==
At previous elections, the government was able to choose the date of an election, but on 3 November 2011, the government introduced fixed four-year terms, with elections being held every four years on the second Saturday in March. This was the first election under the new system.

== Key dates ==
- Issue of writ: 6 February
- Nominations open: 7 February
- Close of party nominations: 12 noon, 14 February
- Close of rolls: 6 pm, 14 February
- Close of independent nominations: 12 noon, 15 February
- Postal voting commences: ?
- Pre-poll voting commences: 20 February
- Polling day: 9 March
- Return of writ: On or before 6 May

== Seats held ==
=== Lower house ===
At the 2008 election, Labor won 28 seats, the Liberals won 24 seats, the Nationals won four seats, with three seats won by independents. Three changes have occurred since; the Greens won the seat of Fremantle off Labor at the 2009 by-election, Vince Catania in the seat of North West defected from Labor to the Nationals in July 2009, and Fremantle MP Adele Carles resigned from the Greens in 2010, leaving Labor with 26 seats, the Liberals with 24 seats, the Nationals with five seats, while independents hold four seats.

Boundary changes took effect at this election. The only changes to the notional 2008 results were that the seat of Morley shifted from Liberal to Labor and the seat of North West (renamed North West Central) shifted from Labor to National.

=== Upper house ===
At the 2008 election, the Liberals won 16 seats, Labor won 11 seats, the Nationals won five seats, and the Greens won four seats.

== Retiring MPs ==
=== Labor ===
- John Kobelke MLA (Balcatta)
- Carol Martin MLA (Kimberley)
- Eric Ripper MLA (Belmont)
- Tom Stephens MLA (Pilbara)
- Martin Whitely MLA (Bassendean)
- Helen Bullock MLC (Mining and Pastoral Region)
- Ed Dermer MLC (North Metropolitan Region)
- Jon Ford MLC (Mining and Pastoral Region)
- Linda Savage MLC (East Metropolitan Region)

=== Liberal ===
- Norman Moore MLC (Mining and Pastoral Region)

=== National ===
- Grant Woodhams MLA (Moore)

=== Independent ===
- John Bowler MLA (Kalgoorlie)
- Liz Constable MLA (Churchlands)

== 2008 pendulum ==
The following Mackerras pendulum works by lining up all of the seats according to the percentage point margin post-election on a two-candidate-preferred basis.

Liberal/National seats
Marginal
North West	Vince Catania	NAT	−3.1 pp^{1}
Riverton	Mike Nahan	LIB	0.2 pp
Wanneroo	Paul Miles	LIB	0.7 pp
Morley	Ian Britza	LIB	0.9 pp
Southern River	Peter Abetz	LIB	1.6 pp
Jandakot	Joe Francis	LIB	1.8 pp
Mount Lawley	Michael Sutherland	LIB	2.2 pp
Nedlands	Bill Marmion	LIB	2.5 pp v IND
Moore	Grant Woodhams	NAT	3.1 pp v LIB
Swan Hills	Frank Alban	LIB	3.5 pp
Eyre	Graham Jacobs	LIB	3.6 pp v NAT
Ocean Reef	Albert Jacob	LIB	4.4 pp
Kingsley	Andrea Mitchell	LIB	4.5 pp
Scarborough	Liza Harvey	LIB	5.2 pp
Darling Range	Tony Simpson	LIB	5.6 pp
Fairly safe
Kalamunda	John Day	LIB	6.3 pp
Murray-Wellington	Murray Cowper	LIB	8.4 pp
Geraldton	Ian Blayney	LIB	8.5 pp
Safe
Dawesville	Kim Hames	LIB	11.1 pp
Bateman	Christian Porter	LIB	11.4 pp
Hillarys	Rob Johnson	LIB	11.4 pp
Bunbury	John Castrilli	LIB	11.7 pp
Vasse	Troy Buswell	LIB	13.5 pp
South Perth	John McGrath	LIB	14.3 pp
Carine	Tony Krsticevic	LIB	14.5 pp
Blackwood-Stirling	Terry Redman	NAT	17.3 pp v LIB
Central Wheatbelt	Brendon Grylls	NAT	17.9 pp v LIB
Cottesloe	Colin Barnett	LIB	19.4 pp
Very safe
Wagin	Terry Waldron	NAT	27.1 pp v LIB
Independent seats
Alfred Cove	Janet Woollard	IND LIB	1.0 pp v LIB
Kalgoorlie	John Bowler	IND	3.6 pp v NAT
Fremantle	Adele Carles	IND	4.0 pp v ALP^{2}
Churchlands	Liz Constable	IND	23.5 pp v ALP

Labor seats
Marginal
Albany	Peter Watson	ALP	0.2 pp
Forrestfield	Andrew Waddell	ALP	0.2 pp
Kwinana	Roger Cook	ALP	0.8 pp v IND
Collie-Preston	Mick Murray	ALP	1.0 pp
Balcatta	John Kobelke	ALP	2.3 pp
Joondalup	Tony O'Gorman	ALP	3.5 pp
Pilbara	Tom Stephens	ALP	3.6 pp
West Swan	Rita Saffioti	ALP	4.4 pp
Gosnells	Chris Tallentire	ALP	5.5 pp
Fairly safe
Belmont	Eric Ripper	ALP	6.7 pp
Kimberley	Carol Martin	ALP	6.8 pp
Perth	John Hyde	ALP	7.8 pp
Midland	Michelle Roberts	ALP	8.3 pp
Mindarie	John Quigley	ALP	8.5 pp
Cannington	Bill Johnston	ALP	9.0 pp
Maylands	Lisa Baker	ALP	9.0 pp
Victoria Park	Ben Wyatt	ALP	9.0 pp
Cockburn	Fran Logan	ALP	9.6 pp
Warnbro	Paul Papalia	ALP	9.7 pp
Safe
Bassendean	Martin Whitely	ALP	10.3 pp
Mandurah	David Templeman	ALP	10.5 pp
Rockingham	Mark McGowan	ALP	10.6 pp
Willagee	Peter Tinley	ALP	10.6 pp v GRN
Girrawheen	Margaret Quirk	ALP	11.5 pp
Nollamara	Janine Freeman	ALP	12.7 pp
Very safe
Armadale	Tony Buti	ALP	20.3 pp v CDP

1.Elected as Labor member, defected to the Nationals in July 2009, margin is ALP v NAT.
2.Elected as Green member, resigned from The Greens in May 2010.

== Post-election pendulum ==
Margins with an asterisk (*) indicate seats that have a different 2-candidate-preferred result other than Labor v. Liberal/National. The 2cp result for each seat is below the table.

Liberal/National seats
Marginal
Belmont	Glenys Godfrey	LIB	0.9
Forrestfield	Nathan Morton	LIB	2.1
Perth	Eleni Evangel	LIB	2.6
Joondalup	Jan Norberger	LIB	4.5
Morley	Ian Britza	LIB	4.7
Swan Hills	Frank Alban	LIB	5.9
Fairly safe
Balcatta	Chris Hatton	LIB	7.3
Jandakot	Joe Francis	LIB	8.1
Riverton	Mike Nahan	LIB	9.2
Mount Lawley	Michael Sutherland	LIB	9.4
Safe
Kalamunda	John Day	LIB	10.5
Wanneroo	Paul Miles	LIB	11.1
Pilbara	Brendon Grylls	NAT	11.5
Murray-Wellington	Murray Cowper	LIB	12.0
Dawesville	Kim Hames	LIB	12.7
Bunbury	John Castrilli	LIB	13.1
North West Central	Vince Catania	NAT	13.5*
Kingsley	Andrea Mitchell	LIB	14.8
Darling Range	Tony Simpson	LIB	15.3
Warren-Blackwood	Terry Redman	NAT	15.6*
Kalgoorlie	Wendy Duncan	NAT	16.9*
Southern River	Peter Abetz	LIB	17.0
Scarborough	Liza Harvey	LIB	17.3
Bateman	Matt Taylor	LIB	17.8
Carine	Tony Krsticevic	LIB	18.1
Ocean Reef	Albert Jacob	LIB	19.0
Hillarys	Rob Johnson	LIB	19.0
Nedlands	Bill Marmion	LIB	19.1
Very safe
Churchlands	Sean L'Estrange	LIB	20.2
Cottesloe	Colin Barnett	LIB	20.9
South Perth	John McGrath	LIB	21.1
Central Wheatbelt	Mia Davies	NAT	21.1*
Vasse	Troy Buswell	LIB	21.2
Geraldton	Ian Blayney	LIB	22.8*
Moore	Shane Love	NAT	23.2*
Eyre	Graham Jacobs	LIB	23.3*
Alfred Cove	Dean Nalder	LIB	23.6
Wagin	Terry Waldron	NAT	25.8*

Labor seats
Marginal
Collie-Preston	Mick Murray	ALP	0.1
Midland	Michelle Roberts	ALP	0.1
Butler	John Quigley	ALP	1.8
West Swan	Rita Saffioti	ALP	1.9
Albany	Peter Watson	ALP	2.0
Cannington	Bill Johnston	ALP	2.1
Girrawheen	Margaret Quirk	ALP	2.4
Gosnells	Chris Tallentire	ALP	2.9
Maylands	Lisa Baker	ALP	3.1
Cockburn	Fran Logan	ALP	4.1
Victoria Park	Ben Wyatt	ALP	4.1
Mirrabooka	Janine Freeman	ALP	4.6
Bassendean	Dave Kelly	ALP	5.1
Kimberley	Josie Farrer	ALP	5.1
Fairly safe
Mandurah	David Templeman	ALP	7.7
Fremantle	Simone McGurk	ALP	7.9
Warnbro	Paul Papalia	ALP	8.8
Armadale	Tony Buti	ALP	9.6
Safe
Willagee	Peter Tinley	ALP	10.6
Kwinana	Roger Cook	ALP	11.8*
Rockingham	Mark McGowan	ALP	13.2

- North West Central had a 2CP margin of 9.7% NAT v LIB.
- Warren-Blackwood had a 2CP margin of 3.1% NAT v LIB.
- Kalgoorlie had a 2CP margin of 6.3% NAT v LIB.
- Central Wheatbelt had a 2CP margin of 7.9% NAT v LIB.
- Geraldton had a 2CP margin of 10.9% LIB v NAT.
- Moore had a 2CP margin of 5.9% NAT v LIB.
- Eyre had a 2CP margin of 0.4% LIB v NAT.
- Wagin had a 2CP margin of 26.9% NAT v LIB.
- Kwinana had a 2CP margin of 2.6% ALP v IND.

== Polling ==
Newspoll polling is conducted via random telephone number selection in city and country areas. Sampling sizes consist of around 1,100 electors. The declared margin of error is ±3 percent.

=== Voting intention ===
View source data.
Graphical summary of opinion polls for voting intention.
View source data.
Graphical summary of two-party-preferred opinion polls.

Legislative Assembly (lower house) polling
	Primary vote					TPP vote
	Lib	Nat	ALP	Gre	Oth	Lib/Nat	ALP
2013 election	47.1%	6.1%	33.1%	8.4%	5.3%	57.3%	42.7%
4–7 Mar 2013	48%	6%	32%	8%	6%	59.5%	40.5%
3–7 Feb 2013	45%	6%	35%	8%	6%	57%	43%
Oct–Dec 2012	43%	6%	30%	12%	9%	58%	42%
Jul–Sep 2012	43%	5%	30%	12%	10%	57%	43%
Jan–Mar 2012	39%	6%	35%	11%	9%	53%	47%
Oct–Dec 2011	46%	4%	29%	12%	9%	59%	41%
Jul–Sep 2011	42%	6%	29%	13%	10%	57%	43%
Apr–Jun 2011	43%	6%	30%	12%	9%	57%	43%
Jan–Mar 2011	43%	6%	31%	13%	7%	57%	43%
Oct–Dec 2010	42%	7%	29%	13%	9%	58%	42%
Jul–Sep 2010	41%	6%	30%	14%	9%	57%	43%
Apr–Jun 2010	38%	6%	32%	16%	8%	54%	46%
Jan–Mar 2010	40%	5%	37%	11%	7%	53%	47%
Jan–Mar 2009	42%	5%	33%	13%	7%	55%	45%
2008 election	38.4%	4.9%	35.8%	11.9%	9.0%	51.9%	48.1%
2–4 Sep 2008	37%	6%	35%	12%	10%	50%	50%
Polling conducted by Newspoll and published in The Australian.

=== Preferred Premier ===
View source data.
Graphical summary of approval rating opinion polls for preferred Premier.

Better Premier polling^
	Liberal Barnett	Labor McGowan
2013 election	–	–
4–7 Mar 2013	52%	31%
3–7 Feb 2013	44%	40%
Oct–Dec 2012	48%	29%
Jul–Sep 2012	45%	29%
Jan–Mar 2012	43%	30%
Oct–Dec 2011	59%	18%^{2}
Jul–Sep 2011	56%	22%^{2}
Apr–Jun 2011	58%	18%^{2}
Jan–Mar 2011	56%	17%^{2}
Oct–Dec 2010	60%	16%^{2}
Jul–Sep 2010	61%	17%^{2}
Apr–Jun 2010	60%	19%^{2}
Jan–Mar 2010	58%	19%^{2}
Jan–Mar 2009	60%	14%^{2}
2008 election	–	–
2–4 Sep 2008	35%	48%^{1}
Polling conducted by Newspoll and published in The Australian.^ Remainder were "uncommitted" to either leader.^{1} Alan Carpenter.^{2} Eric Ripper.

=== Approval ratings ===
View source data.
Graphical summary of approval rating opinion polls for Colin Barnett.
View source data.
Graphical summary of approval rating opinion polls for Labor leaders (Alan Carpenter, Eric Ripper and Mark McGowan).

Satisfaction polling^
	Barnett		McGowan
	Satisfied	Dissatisfied	Satisfied	Dissatisfied
2013 election	–	–	–	–
4–7 Mar 2013	51%	36%	49%	29%
3–7 Feb 2013	47%	42%	51%	26%
Oct–Dec 2012	49%	37%	44%	26%
Jul–Sep 2012	48%	37%	48%	23%
Jan–Mar 2012	51%	33%	43%	17%
Oct–Dec 2011	58%	28%	34%^{2}	39%^{2}
Jul–Sep 2011	51%	35%	34%^{2}	43%^{2}
Apr–Jun 2011	50%	37%	33%^{2}	43%^{2}
Jan–Mar 2011	54%	33%	31%^{2}	44%^{2}
Oct–Dec 2010	55%	35%	33%^{2}	43%^{2}
Jul–Sep 2010	56%	32%	34%^{2}	42%^{2}
Apr–Jun 2010	55%	33%	36%^{2}	44%^{2}
Jan–Mar 2010	51%	34%	33%^{2}	43%^{2}
Jan–Mar 2009	56%	23%	35%^{2}	34%^{2}
2008 election	–	–	–	–
2–4 Sep 2008	40%	43%	42%^{1}	48%^{1}
Polling conducted by Newspoll and published in The Australian.^Remainder were "uncommitted" to either leader.^{1} Alan Carpenter.^{2} Eric Ripper.

== Newspaper endorsements ==
Newspaper	Endorsement
The Australian	Liberal
The Australian Financial Review	Behind paywall
The West Australian	Liberal

== See also ==
- Candidates of the 2013 Western Australian state election
