= Dean Nalder =

Australian politician (born 1966)

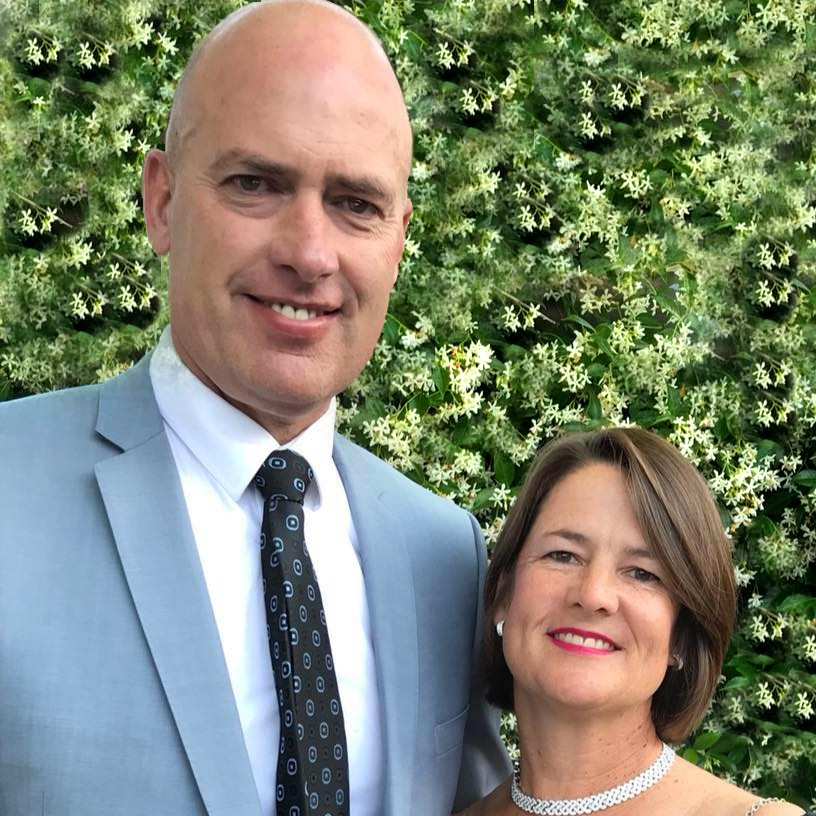
- Dean Nalder with wife Colette Nalder

Western Australian Minister for Transport
- In office 17 March 2014 – 20 September 2016
- Premier: Colin Barnett
- Preceded by: Troy Buswell
- Succeeded by: Bill Marmion

Western Australian Minister for Agriculture and Food
- In office 31 March 2016 – 20 September 2016
- Premier: Colin Barnett
- Preceded by: Ken Baston
- Succeeded by: Mark Lewis

Western Australian Minister for Finance
- In office 17 March 2014 – 8 December 2014
- Premier: Colin Barnett
- Preceded by: Mike Nahan
- Succeeded by: Bill Marmion

Member of the Western Australian Legislative Assembly for Bateman
- In office 11 March 2017 – 13 March 2021
- Preceded by: Matt Taylor
- Succeeded by: Kim Giddens

Member of the Western Australian Legislative Assembly for Alfred Cove
- In office 9 March 2013 – 11 March 2017
- Preceded by: Janet Woollard
- Succeeded by: District abolished

Personal details
- Born: Dean Cambell Nalder; 5 February 1966 (age 60) Narrogin, Western Australia, Australia
- Party: Liberal Party of Australia

Dean Cambell Nalder (born 5 February 1966) is an Australian former politician who was a member of the Legislative Assembly of Western Australia for the Liberal Party from 2013 to 2021, representing the seat of Alfred Cove until 2017, and Bateman following the 2017 electoral boundary re-distribution. At various times, he served as Minister for Transport, Minister for Finance and Minister for Agriculture and Food in the ministry of Premier Colin Barnett from 2014 to 2016. Following the Liberals' defeat at the 2017 state election, Nalder served in a number of shadow portfolios in the shadow ministries of Mike Nahan and Liza Harvey until resigning from the frontbench on 8 December 2020, following his announcement of retirement from politics at the next election. He was succeeded in his seat of Bateman by Labor's Kim Giddens on 13 March 2021.

== Early life ==
Nalder was born in Narrogin, and raised on a farm at Wagin, in Western Australia's Wheatbelt region. His father, Cambell Nalder, was a National Party member of parliament, and his grandfather, Sir Crawford Nalder, was a leader of the Country Party of Western Australia and Deputy Premier of Western Australia.

Nalder attended Wesley College, Perth for his secondary education, and attended Curtin University of Technology, graduating in 1988 with a bachelor's degree in business, economics and financial management. In 1995, Nalder completed a graduate diploma in applied finance from the Securities Institute of Australia.

He worked for the ANZ Bank from 1990 until 2008. Various promotions during those years saw him moving successively to Sydney and Melbourne. In 2004, he returned to Perth, to take up the position of general manager retail for South Australia and Western Australia. In 2008, Nalder joined Australia Post as state commercial manager, leaving the organisation in 2010, rather than move to the eastern states.

== Australian rules football career ==
Between 1988 and 1991, Nalder played Australian rules football for the South Fremantle Football Club, appearing in 30 matches in the West Australian Football League (WAFL). He represented South Fremantle as a centre half-forward in the 1989 2nd semi-final of the WAFL.

He retired in 1992 due to injuries.

== Politics ==
Nalder entered parliament at the 2013 state election, winning the seat of Alfred Cove from the independent incumbent Janet Woollard. Following the resignation of Troy Buswell from the Barnett Ministry on 10 March 2014, Nalder was appointed Minister for Transport and Minister for Finance. He replaced Mike Nahan (who had been elevated to Treasurer) in the latter position.

Nalder was removed as Minister of Finance in December 2014 after allegations emerged of potential conflicts of interest between his private business interests and his ministerial responsibilities. The allegations included that he had failed to properly disclose a personal investment he had made in Metier Asia and had a potential conflict of interest relating to a car leasing company which provided services to public servants under a scheme administered by his own department. Western Australian Premier Colin Barnett ordered a review of Nalder's private financial interests and, despite the review finding no evidence that Nalder had sought or gained any personal benefit, criticised him for "serious errors of judgement" and demoted him as the Minister for Finance. Nalder accepted his demotion and acknowledged that he had made mistakes which had "created the perception of a potential wrong-doing."

In October 2015, WA Auditor General Colin Murphy found Nalder's refusal to provide information to Parliament about the controversial Perth Freight Link was "not appropriate" and "not reasonable".

A redistribution ahead of the 2017 state election saw Alfred Cove abolished, with most of Nalder's base transferred to neighbouring Bateman, held by fellow first-term Liberal Matt Taylor. Nalder challenged Taylor for Liberal preselection and won. At the election, he retained Bateman for the Liberals, albeit with a swing of 13.7 percent.

=== MAX Light Rail ===
MAX Light Rail was a proposed light rail network promised by the Liberal Party in the lead-up to the 2013 election.

Construction of the first stage was originally scheduled to begin in 2016, and be completed by the end of 2018. However, Nalder deferred the project in 2015 for three years, in response to the Barnett Government's financial woes and the loss of the state's AAA Credit Rating. Under the new timeframe, the MAX network was to open in 2022.

In April 2014, Nalder became Minister for Transport just a year after entering Parliament. Nalder announced the government would investigate splitting the project into two parts, to allow an earlier start to be made on construction, with priority given to the Balga – CBD section.

In March 2015, Nalder announced the government was considering using buses to implement the MAX route rather than light rail. He said a preliminary analysis suggested that using buses would cost approximately 50% less than a light rail system. At the time, Nalder denied that represented a broken promise.

In February 2016, Nalder announced another change, this time promising a heavy rail line.

In June 2016, Nalder confirmed that the MAX light rail plan had been cancelled. While still planning a northern transport corridor, he said it would not be implemented using light rail and would use other alternatives.

=== Later ===
In September 2016, Nalder resigned from the ministry, stating he no longer supported Colin Barnett as leader of the Liberal Party Days after his resignation, Nalder announced that he would stand for the Liberal Party leadership if a spill motion was successful. At a party-room meeting, the spill motion was moved by one of his supporters, Murray Cowper, but was defeated 31–15, and Nalder subsequently said that he had "no further interest in any challenge".

In November 2020, Nalder announced he would run for the Liberal leadership, following Liza Harvey's resignation four months out from the 2021 Western Australian state election, but dropped out of the race shortly before the vote, citing a lack of sufficient support. In December 2020, he announced that he would not re-contest his seat of Bateman at the election due in March 2021, citing family reasons. A few days later, he also announced his immediate resignation as shadow treasurer, reportedly throwing the Liberal Party into disarray.

== See also ==
- South Fremantle Football Club
- Barnett Ministry
- Members of the Western Australian Legislative Assembly

Parliament of Western Australia
Preceded by Janet Woollard	Member for Alfred Cove; 2013–2017	Abolished
Preceded by Matt Taylor	Member for Bateman; 2017–2021	Succeeded by Kim Giddens
Political offices
Preceded by Troy Buswell	Minister for Transport; 2014–2016	Succeeded by Bill Marmion
Preceded by Mike Nahan	Minister for Finance; 2014	Succeeded by Bill Marmion
Preceded by Ken Baston	Minister for Agriculture and Food; 2016	Succeeded by Mark Lewis
