= Nathan Morton =

Australian politician

Member of the Legislative Assembly of Western Australia
- In office 9 March 2013 – 11 March 2017
- Preceded by: Andrew Waddell
- Succeeded by: Stephen Price
- Constituency: Forrestfield

Personal details
- Born: Nathan Wray Morton; 3 August 1978 (age 47) Melbourne, Victoria, Australia
- Party: Liberal

Nathan Wray Morton (born 3 August 1978) is a former Australian politician who was a member of the Legislative Assembly of Western Australia from 2013 to 2017, representing the seat of Forrestfield. He was a schoolteacher before entering politics.

Morton was born in Melbourne, but moved to Perth as a small child. He holds a Bachelor of Science degree and a graduate diploma in education, and most taught at Cecil Andrews Senior High School. Morton first stood for parliament at the 2008 state election, but was defeated by Labor's Andrew Waddell in Forrestfield by just 98 votes on the two-party-preferred count (the third-closest result of the election). He reprised his candidacy at the 2013 state election, and defeated Waddell with a 2.3-point swing. Morton ran for re-election at the 2017 state election but lost the seat to the Labor candidate, Stephen Price after suffering an 11.6% swing against him. Morton is a nephew by marriage of Helen Morton, who was a member of the Legislative Council. Helen Morton was also defeated at the 2017 state election.

Western Australian Legislative Assembly
Preceded by Andrew Waddell	Member for Forrestfield; 2013–2017	Succeeded by Stephen Price
