= Australian Christians (political party) =

- Abbreviation: AC
- Leader: Maryka Groenewald
- President: Mike Crichton
- Founded: 2011; 15 years ago
- Registered: 15 December 2011; 14 years ago
- Headquarters: 16 Guthrie Street, Osborne Park, Western Australia, 6017
- Ideology: Conservatism; Social conservatism Christian right
- Political position: Right-wing to far-right
- Religion: Christianity
- Western Australian Legislative Council: 1 / 37
- City of Rockingham: 1 / 13

Website
- australianchristians.org.au

The Australian Christians (AC), sometimes referred to as the Australian Christians Party (ACP), is a political party in Australia that is socially conservative and Christian-conservative. It was founded in 2011 and was registered by the Australian Electoral Commission (AEC) on 15 December 2011.

The party is primarily active in Western Australia and contests both state and federal elections, and elected its first representative to the Parliament of Western Australia at the 2025 Western Australian state election. The party aims to represent what it sees as Christian values.

== History ==
The party was formed after the Victorian and Western Australian branches of the Christian Democratic Party (CDP) voted to form a new party. The party has endorsed senate candidates in Western Australia, Victoria and Tasmania and plans to expand into South Australia and Queensland. The party has decided not to operate in New South Wales, where the CDP has one seat in the Legislative Council.

The party contested the 2012 Melbourne state by-election, receiving about 1% of the vote. The party contested the 2013 Western Australian state election, receiving 1.95% of the vote.

It also contested the 2013, 2016 and 2019 federal elections. At the 2016 federal election, Australian Christians fielded senate candidates for Western Australia, Victoria and Queensland and a total of eighteen candidates for seats in the House of Representatives across Victoria and Western Australia

The Party has been growing across Western Australia, and has contested all State and by-elections since 2011. The Party is headquartered in Osborne Park, WA.

In May 2017, Cory Bernardi, the leader of the Australian Conservatives, met the national and Victoria state leaders of the Australian Christians to discuss a merger between the two parties. In September 2017, the Victoria state leadership of the Australian Christians agreed to merge the branch with the Conservatives, whilst the WA branch remained. (The Australian Conservatives subsequently ceased operating in June 2019).

The Western Australian branch stood candidates for both the House of Representatives and the Senate at the 2019 federal election. It fielded candidates at the 2021 WA state election but did not win any seats.

The May 2022 federal election saw the Australian Christians contest WA seats, both in the senate and for nine in the House of Representatives.

In July 2023, WA branch president Mike Crichton contested the Rockingham by-election triggered by the resignation of former premier Mark McGowan, receiving 2.44% of the vote. Crichton was subsequently elected to the City of Rockingham Council later that year.

In the 2025 Western Australian state election, the party won its first ever seat in the Legislative Council, with party leader Maryka Groenewald being elected.

== Policies ==
=== Social issues ===
The Australian Christians oppose abortion, assisted suicide, euthanasia, pornography, homosexuality and same-sex marriage. It wants to "uphold marriage as the bond of union between a man and a woman, as husband and wife", ISP filtering on all devices to block "harmful content and pornography" and wants the Bible to be the foundation for laws, education and culture in Australia.

The party also "opposes the use of embryonic stem cells in medical research" and "believes the use of reproductive technology should be limited to married, opposite-sex couples".

=== Economic issues and climate change ===
The party wants to increase taxes and import tariffs on drinks according to their alcohol content. It also wants an economy which is a mix of public and private, aiming for low inflation and high employment, particularly among young people.

Additionally, the party wants to make public transport cost less.

The party does not believe that climate change is caused by human activity.

== Election results ==
Senate

Election year	# of overall votes	% of overall vote	# of seats won	# of overall seats	+/–
2013	54,154	0.40 #19	0 / 40	0 / 76	0
2016	66,525	0.48 #18 ▲	0 / 76	0 / 76	0
2019	23,983	0.16 #28 ▼	0 / 40	0 / 76	0
2022	33,143	0.22 #21 ▲	0 / 40	0 / 76	0
2025	102,519	0.64 #13 ▲	0 / 40	0 / 76	0

=== Western Australia ===
Election year	Legislative Assembly				Legislative Council			
Election year	# votes	% votes	# seats	+/–	# votes	% votes	# seats	+/–
2013	21,451	1.81	0 / 59	0	23,877	1.95	0 / 36	0
2017	27,724	2.10 ▲	0 / 59	0	26,209	1.94 #7 ▲	0 / 36	0
2021	20,869	1.48 ▼	0 / 59	0	28,051	1.95 #6 ▲	0 / 36	0
2025	48,407	3.17 ▲	0 / 59	0	41,348	2.66 #6 ▲	1 / 36	▲1

=== Victoria ===
Election year	Legislative Assembly				Legislative Council			
Election year	# votes	% votes	# seats	+/–	# votes	% votes	# seats	+/–
2014	26,560	0.79	0 / 88	0	35,164	1.03 #11	0 / 40	0

== See also ==
- Christian politics in Australia
- Family First Party
- Opposition to LGBTQ rights
