= Andrew Waddell (politician) =

Australian politician

Andrew John Waddell (born 16 May 1966) is a former Australian politician who was a member of the Legislative Assembly of Western Australia from 2008 to 2013.

Waddell was born on 16 May 1966 in Perth, Western Australia. He went to High Wycombe Primary School, Forrestfield High School, and Curtin University. He married on 7 November 1999 and has one daughter.

From 2013 to 2017, Waddell was the shire president and later mayor of the Shire and City of Kalamunda.

Western Australian Legislative Assembly
Preceded by New seat	Member for Forrestfield; 2008–2013	Succeeded by Nathan Morton
