= Matt Taylor (politician) =

Australian politician

Member of the Western Australian Legislative Assembly for Bateman
- In office 9 March 2013 – 11 March 2017
- Preceded by: Christian Porter
- Succeeded by: Dean Nalder

Personal details
- Born: 4 March 1973 (age 53) Cottesloe, Western Australia
- Party: Liberal Party

Matthew Howard Taylor (born 4 March 1973) is an Australian politician. He was the Liberal member for the Western Australian Legislative Assembly seat of Bateman from 2013 to 2017.

After a redistribution shifted much of the Liberal base in Alfred Cove to Bateman, Taylor was forced into a preselection contest with former minister Dean Nalder, Alfred Cove's last member. Nalder won the contest, leading Taylor to contest the new seat of Bicton. He lost to Labor challenger Lisa O'Malley.

Western Australian Legislative Assembly
| Preceded by Christian Porter | Member for Bateman; 2013–2017 | Succeeded by Dean Nalder |
