= Electoral results for the North Metropolitan Region =

This is a list of electoral results for the North Metropolitan Region in Western Australian state elections from the region's creation in 1989 until the present.

Legislation to abolish the region, along with all other Western Australian electoral regions, was passed in November 2021, with the 2025 state election to use a single state-wide electorate of 37 members.

== Election results ==
=== 2021 ===
2021 Western Australian state election: North Metropolitan
Party	Candidate	Votes	%	±%
Quota		52,319		
Labor	1. Pierre Yang (elected 1); 2. Martin Pritchard (elected 3); 3. Ayor Makur Chuot (elected 4); 4. Dan Caddy (elected 5); 5. Rhys Vallance; 6. Rebeka Marton	215,054	58.72	+21.50
Liberal	1. Peter Collier (elected 2); 2. Tjorn Sibma (elected 6); 3. Simon Ehrenfeld; 4. Tim Walton; 5. Michael Mischin	85,379	23.31	−13.16
Greens	1. Alison Xamon; 2. Daniel Vujcich; 3. Sarah Newbold	27,077	7.39	−2.58
Christians	1. Louis Hildebrandt; 2. Neil Fearis	6,242	1.70	+0.10
Legalise Cannabis	1. Max Armstrong-Moore; 2. Fred Mulholland	5,380	1.47	+1.47
One Nation	1. Tyler Walsh; 2. Sheila Mundy	5,069	1.38	−5.08
No Mandatory Vaccination	1. James Pearce; 2. A. Cirkovic; 3. Sara O'Dal	4,550	1.24	+1.24
Western Australia	1. Elizabeth Re; 2. Steven Pynt	2,669	0.73	+0.13
Animal Justice	1. Michael Anagno; 2. Stephanie Fry	2,593	0.71	−0.48
Shooters, Fishers, Farmers	1. Jan Van Niekerk; 2. Marty Wenham	2,399	0.66	−0.64
Liberal Democrats	1. Kate Fantinel; 2. Richard Tait	1,419	0.39	−0.70
Independent	1. Rafe Roberts; 2. Carel Husselmann	1,335	0.36	+0.36
Liberals for Climate	1. Daithi Gleeson; 2. Paul Holliday	1,268	0.35	−0.09
WAxit	1. John Golawski; 2. Aleksandra Sommer	1,248	0.34	−0.27
Sustainable Australia	1. Colin Scott; 2. Michael Ferrinda	974	0.27	+0.27
Daylight Saving	1. Robert Tucker; 2. Heather Atcheson	888	0.24	−0.56
Great Australian	1. Chris Irwin; 2. Ben Tonkin	721	0.20	+0.20
Health Australia	1. Sanjeev Gupta; 2. George Helou	577	0.16	+0.16
	1. Michael Tucak; 2. John Tucak	482	0.13	−0.15
Independent	1. Andrea Randle; 2. Wvendy Chan	467	0.13	+0.13
Independent	1. Billy Amesz; 2. Steven Gersbach	174	0.05	+0.05
Independent	T. Ravichandar	148	0.04	+0.04
Independent	1. N. Spada; 2. M. Husselmann	116	0.03	+0.03
Total formal votes		366,229	98.49	+1.40
Informal votes		5,633	1.51	−1.40
Turnout		371,862	86.93	−0.28

=== 2017 ===
2017 Western Australian state election: North Metropolitan
Party	Candidate	Votes	%	±%
Quota		47,901		
Labor	1. Alannah MacTiernan (elected 1); 2. Martin Pritchard (elected 3); 3. Kelly Shay; 4. Hannah Beazley; 5. Laine McDonald; 6. Hugh Nguyen	124,809	37.22	+7.89
Liberal	1. Peter Collier (elected 2); 2. Michael Mischin (elected 4); 3. Tjorn Sibma (elected 6); 4. Victoria Jackson; 5. Sandra Brewer; 6. Tim Walton	122,296	36.47	−20.60
Greens	1. Alison Xamon (elected 5); 2. Samantha Jenkinson; 3. Ziggy Fatnowna	33,448	9.98	+1.16
One Nation	1. John Bombak; 2. Ian Hamilton	21,677	6.46	+6.46
Christians	1. Dwight Randall; 2. Neil Fearis	5,382	1.61	+0.06
Shooters, Fishers, Farmers	1. Stefan Colagiuri; 2. Shane Aylmore; 3. Kingsley Smith	4,359	1.30	+0.20
Animal Justice	1. Natasha Chakich; 2. Elizabeth McCasker	3,989	1.19	+1.19
Liberal Democrats	1. Brian Murray; 2. John Ogilvie	3,662	1.09	+1.09
Daylight Saving	1. Tye Short; 2. Michael Kennedy	2,700	0.81	+0.81
Family First	1. Henry Heng; 2. Lesley Croll	2,369	0.71	−0.23
Micro Business	1. John Golawski; 2. Matt Golawski; 3. Mariah Bennington	2,063	0.62	+0.62
Matheson for WA	1. Julie Matheson; 2. Jane Boxall	2,017	0.60	+0.60
Independent Flux	1. Raoul Smith; 2. Michael Carey	1,701	0.51	+0.51
Flux the System!	1. Joshua van Ross; 2. Owen Merriman	1,465	0.44	+0.44
Fluoride Free WA	1. Anne Porter; 2. David Bauer	1,084	0.32	+0.32
Independent	Michael Tucak	947	0.28	+0.28
Independent Flux	1. A. Albert; 2. Claire Norton	851	0.25	+0.25
Independent	Derek Ammon	313	0.09	+0.09
Independent	Joe Ruzzi	168	0.05	+0.05
Total formal votes		335,300	97.65	+0.07
Informal votes		8,061	2.35	−0.07
Turnout		343,361	87.78	−1.91

=== 2013 ===
2013 Western Australian state election: North Metropolitan
Party	Candidate	Votes	%	±%
Liberal	1. Peter Collier (elected 1); 2. Michael Mischin (elected 3); 3. Liz Behjat (elected 5); 4. Peter Katsambanis (elected 6); 5. Elise Irwin; 6. Paul Collins	176,867	57.07	+10.78
Labor	1. Ken Travers (elected 2); 2. Ljiljanna Ravlich (elected 4); 3. Martin Pritchard; 4. Laine McDonald; 5. Sarah Seymour; 6. Rebeka Marton	90,892	29.33	−3.33
Greens	1. Cameron Poustie; 2. Rebecca Brown; 3. Heather Aquilina	27,327	8.82	−4.17
Christians	1. Ray Moran; 2. Rudy Labordus	4,779	1.54	−0.71
Shooters and Fishers	1. Paul Bedford; 2. D'arne Stubbs	3,415	1.10	+1.10
Family First	1. Henry Heng; 2. Douglas Croker	2,910	0.94	−0.60
Independent	Noel Avery	1,294	0.42	+0.42
Independent	Angela Smith	1,089	0.35	+0.35
Independent	Michael Tucak	1,008	0.33	+0.33
Independent	Douglas Thorp	306	0.10	+0.10
Total formal votes		309,887	97.58	+0.16
Informal votes		7,691	2.42	−0.16
Turnout		317,578	89.69	+1.87

=== 2008 ===
2008 Western Australian state election: North Metropolitan
Party	Candidate	Votes	%	±%
Quota		40,034		
Liberal	1. Peter Collier (elected 1); 2. Michael Mischin (elected 3); 3. Liz Behjat (elected 5); 4. Colin Edwardes; 5. Judith Dowson	129,709	46.29	+4.2
Labor	1. Ken Travers (elected 2); 2. Ed Dermer (elected 4); 3. Tim Daly; 4. Kelly Shay; 5. Iqbal Samnakay; 6. Bill Leadbetter	91,512	32.66	−7.8
Greens	1. Giz Watson (elected 6); 2. Cameron Poustie; 3. Brenda Roy	36,413	12.99	+4.1
Christian Democrats	1. Ruth Nicholls; 2. David Kingston	6,302	2.25	−0.1
Family First	1. Trona Young; 2. Doug Croker	4,329	1.54	−0.3
Independent	1. Brian Peachey; 2. Joseph Nardizzi	3,936	1.40	+1.4
National	1. Joanne Burges; 2. Cheryl Fahey	2,181	0.78	+0.8
Daylight Savings	Ben MacKinnon	2,062	0.74	+0.74
Independent	1. John Eyden; 2. Paul Young	1,112	0.40	+0.4
One Nation	George Gault	1,098	0.39	−0.5
Independent	Julie Gray	576	0.21	+0.2
Citizens Electoral Council	1. Ron McLean; 2. Paul Augustson	432	0.15	+0.2
Independent	Eugene Hands	203	0.07	+0.1
	Douglas Greypower	172	0.06	+0.1
Independent	Wally Morris	143	0.05	+0.1
	Christopher King	55	0.02	+0.0
Total formal votes		280,235	97.42	+0.3
Informal votes		7,428	2.58	−0.3
Turnout		287,663	86.61	−3.9

=== 2005 ===
2005 Western Australian state election: North Metropolitan
Party	Candidate	Votes	%	±%
Quota		42,732		
Labor	1. Ed Dermer (elected 1); 2. Ken Travers (elected 3); 3. Graham Giffard (elected 5); 4. Daniel Smith; 5. Carolyn Burton; 6. Daniel Mycyk	144,921	42.4	+5.4
Liberal	1. George Cash (elected 2); 2. Peter Collier (elected 4); 3. Ray Halligan (elected 6); 4. David Clyne; 5. Rod Webb	137,888	40.3	+1.9
Greens	1. Giz Watson (elected 7); 2. Cameron Poustie; 3. Brenda Roy	30,065	8.8	−0.9
Christian Democrats	1. Dwight Randall; 2. Raymond Moran	8,130	2.4	0.0
Family First	1. Michelle Bolt; 2. Symia Hopkinson	6,370	1.9	+1.9
Democrats	1. Pat Olver; 2. Giuseppe Coletti	3,726	1.1	−3.2
Independent	Kevin Cloghan	3,611	1.1	+1.1
One Nation	1. George Gault; 2. Alex Patrick	3,123	0.9	−5.2
Public Hospital Support Group	1. Kareen Squires; 2. Patricia Edmonds	2,067	0.6	+0.6
Liberals for Forests	1. Renae Dunkley; 2. Bill Wormald	1,617	0.5	+0.5
Group D	1. Nikki Ulasowski; 2. Don Cowan	239	0.1	+0.1
Independent	Malcolm Mummery	93	0.03	+0.03
Total formal votes		341,850	97.1	−0.3
Informal votes		10,295	2.9	+0.3
Turnout		352,145	90.5	−0.2

=== 2001 ===
2001 Western Australian state election: North Metropolitan
Party	Candidate	Votes	%	±%
Quota		39,829		
Liberal	1. George Cash (elected 1); 2. Ray Halligan (elected 3); 3. Alan Cadby (elected 5); 4. Peter Collier; 5. Michael Sutherland; 6. Andre Shannon; 7. Alan Carstairs	122,217	38.4	−8.0
Labor	1. Ed Dermer (elected 2); 2. Ken Travers (elected 4); 3. Graham Giffard (elected 7); 4. Batong Pham; 5. Roslyn Harley; 6. Andrew Waddell	118,027	37.0	+6.1
Greens	1. Giz Watson (elected 6); 2. Cameron Poustie; 3. Brenda Roy	31,031	9.7	+3.3
One Nation	1. Gerry Kenworthy; 2. Leeann Hopkins	19,403	6.1	+6.1
Democrats	1. Helen Hodgson; 2. Tim Law	13,690	4.3	−3.4
Christian Democrats	1. Dwight Randall; 2. Brian Peachey	7,698	2.4	+2.4
Independent	1. Ismail Fredericks; 2. Sam Basri	3,539	1.1	+1.1
Independent	David Berry	1,491	0.5	+0.5
Curtin Labor Alliance	1. Michael Whiteside; 2. Ismail Julius	910	0.3	+0.3
Seniors	Audrey Anderson	414	0.1	+0.1
Independent	Bronislaw Tabaczynski	207	0.1	+0.1
Total formal votes		318,627	97.4	+0.3
Informal votes		8,426	2.6	−0.3
Turnout		327,053	90.7	+0.5

=== 1996 ===
1996 Western Australian state election: North Metropolitan
Party	Candidate	Votes	%	±%
Quota		37,402		
Liberal	1. George Cash (elected 1); 2. Max Evans (elected 3); 3. Ross Lightfoot (elected 5); 4. Ray Halligan; 5. Cam Tinley; 6. Lesley Goudie; 7. Michael Sutherland	138,852	46.4	−6.1
Labor	1. Ed Dermer (elected 2); 2. Ken Travers (elected 4); 3. Mark Cuomo; 4. Nick Agocs; 5. Pauline O'Connor; 6. June Galea	92,471	30.9	+2.3
Democrats	1. Helen Hodgson (elected 6); 2. Stephen Crabbe	22,961	7.7	+3.8
Greens	1. Giz Watson (elected 7); 2. Robin Chapple	19,097	6.4	−1.3
Group E	1. Reg Davies; 2. Adam Davies	11,680	3.9	−2.2
Marijuana	1. Gordon Huntley; 2. Michael Solonec	8,674	2.9	+2.9
Group G	1. Chris Burke; 2. Joan Samuel	2,561	0.9	+0.9
Australia First	Fred Rieben	1,695	0.6	+0.6
Natural Law	1. George Kailis; 2. Elenora Kailis	1,224	0.4	+0.4
Total formal votes		299,215	97.1	+3.4
Informal votes		8,831	2.9	−3.4
Turnout		308,046	90.2	−3.8

=== 1993 ===
1993 Western Australian state election: North Metropolitan
Party	Candidate	Votes	%	±%
Quota		34,161		
Liberal	1. George Cash (elected 1); 2. Bob Pike (elected 3); 3. Max Evans (elected 5); 4. Ross Lightfoot (elected 6); 5. Iain MacLean; 6. Alan Carstairs	143,450	52.49	+7.83
Labor	1. Graham Edwards (elected 2); 2. Sam Piantadosi (elected 4); 3. John O'Connor; 4. Ed Dermer; 5. Victor Leonzini; 6. Robert McLoughlin	78,115	28.58	−10.66
Greens	1. Brenda Roy; 2. Maria Catelli	21,161	7.74	+4.69
Independent	1. Reg Davies (elected 7); 2. Adam Davies	16,721	6.12	+6.12
Democrats	1. Richard Jeffreys; 2. Sarah Gilfillan-Gray; 3. John Massam	10,627	3.89	+0.46
Grey Power	Phil King	1,753	0.64	−3.70
Republican	Eugene Hands	1,459	0.53	+0.53
Total formal votes		273,286	93.74	−3.34
Informal votes		18,260	6.26	+3.34
Turnout		291,546	94.05	

=== 1989 ===
1989 Western Australian state election: North Metropolitan
Party	Candidate	Votes	%	±%
Quota		32,457		
Liberal	1. George Cash (elected 1); 2. Max Evans (elected 3); 3. Bob Pike (elected 5); 4. Reg Davies (elected 7); 5. Chris Ellison; 6. Wendy Cole; 7. Robert Burr	115,972	44.66	
Labor	1. Joe Berinson (elected 2); 2. Graham Edwards (elected 4); 3. Sam Piantadosi (elected 6); 4. Kay Lunt; 5. Judith Jones; 6. Nick Griffiths; 7. Malcolm Jackson	101,893	39.24	
Grey Power	1. Phillip King; 2. Kryna Gudgeon	11,260	4.34	
Democrats	1. Richard Jeffreys; 2. Brian Jenkins	8,902	3.43	
Greens	1. Kim Herbert; 2. Nadine Lapthorne	7,927	3.05	
Group A	1. Peter Weygers; 2. John Massam	5,635	2.17	
National	1. Elizabeth Beveridge; 2. Neil Baker; 3. Pamela Eves; 4. Duncan Anderson	3,433	1.32	
Group I	1. Shirley de la Hunty; 2. David Kaesehagen; 3. Norma Rundle	2,482	0.96	
One Australia Movement	1. Ronald Holt; 2. Frank Gould; 3. Leonard Sherwood	1,823	0.70	
Independent	Walter Morris	341	0.13	
Total formal votes		259,658	97.08	
Informal votes		7,800	2.92	
Turnout		267,458	91.01	
