= Results of the 2025 Western Australian state election (Legislative Council) =

2025 Western Australian state election (Legislative Council)
- 8 March 2025

All 37 seats in the Western Australian Legislative Council 19 seats needed for a majority

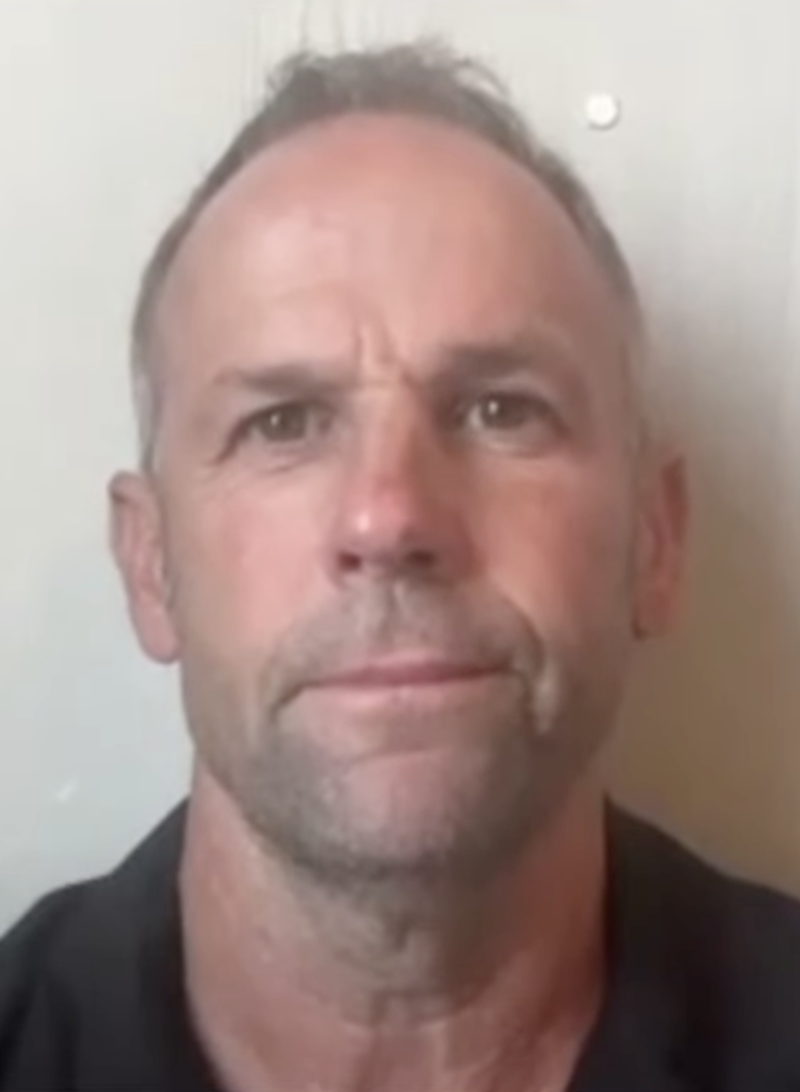

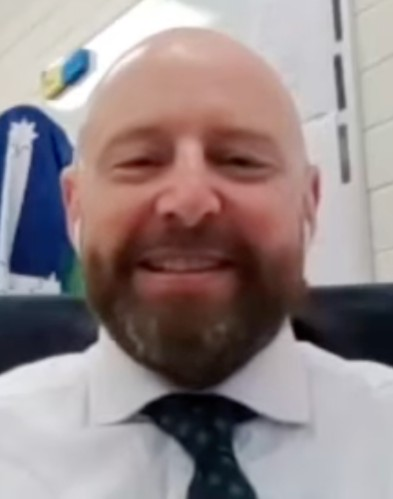

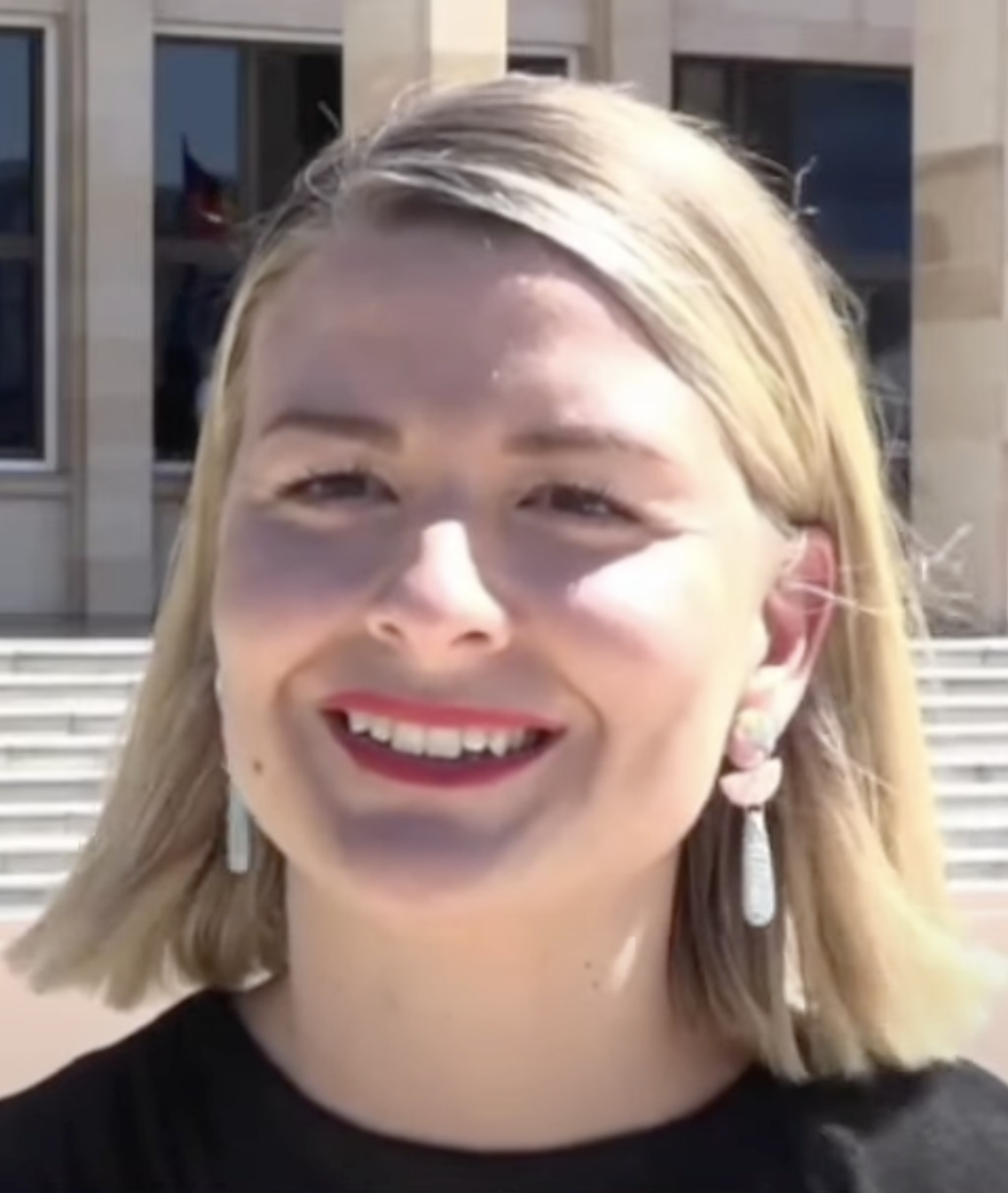
| | First party | Second party | Third party |
|---|---|---|---|
| Leader | N/A | N/A | No leader |
| Party | Labor | Liberal | Greens |
| Last election | 22 seats | 7 seats | 1 seat |
| Seats before | 21 (Note: Following the retirement of Labor MLC Alannah MacTiernan, Ben Dawkins was elected via countback as her replacement. However, he was suspended from Labor prior to being sworn in and was officially expelled from the party on 25 April 2023.) | 7 | 1 |
| Seats won | 16 | 10 | 4 |
| Seat change | ▼5 | ▲3 | ▲3 |
| Primary vote | 635,537 | 422,655 | 170,052 |
| Percentage | 40.89% | 27.20% | 10.94% |
| Swing | ▼19.44pp | ▲9.52pp | ▲4.56pp |
| | Fourth party | Fifth party | Sixth party |
| Leader | N/A | Rod Caddies | Brian Walker |
| Party | National | One Nation | Legalise Cannabis |
| Last election | 3 seats | 0 seats | 2 seats |
| Seats before | 2 (Note: Louise Kingston resigned from the National Party on 20 June 2024.) | 0 | 1 (Note: Sophia Moermond resigned from the Legalise Cannabis Party on 9 May 2024.) |
| Seats won | 2 | 2 | 1 |
| Seat change | ▼1 | ▲2 | Steady |
| Primary vote | 84,203 | 59,296 | 44,754 |
| Percentage | 5.42% | 3.82% | 2.88% |
| Swing | ▲2.62pp | ▲2.34pp | ▲0.90pp |
| | Seventh party | Eighth party |
| | | AJP |
| Leader | Maryka Groenewald | Amanda Dorn |
| Party | Christians | Animal Justice |
| Last election | 0 seats | 0 seats |
| Seats before | 0 | 0 |
| Seats won | 1 | 1 |
| Seat change | ▲1 | ▲1 |
| Primary vote | 41,348 | 18,803 |
| Percentage | 2.66% | 1.21% |
| Swing | ▲0.71pp | ▲0.53pp |

This is a list of Legislative Council results for the 2025 Western Australian state election.

Following the 2021 state election, the McGowan Labor government introduced changes to the Legislative Council's voting system, removing the six multi-member electoral regions that had been in place since 1989. Beginning in 2025, all members are elected to a statewide constituency, increasing from 36 members to 37 members. The members are elected to a statewide electorate using single transferable voting and a quota of 1/38th + 1 (or 2.63%), producing a quota of 41,000 out of 1.6M valid votes, replacing group voting tickets.

== Results summary ==
| Party | Votes | % | +/– | Seats | +/– |
|---|---|---|---|---|---|
| Labor | 635,537 | 40.89 | ▼19.44 | 16 | ▼6 |
| Liberal | 422,655 | 27.20 | ▲9.52 | 10 | ▲3 |
| Greens | 170,052 | 10.94 | ▲4.56 | 4 | ▲3 |
| National | 84,203 | 5.42 | ▲2.62 | 2 | ▼1 |
| One Nation | 59,296 | 3.82 | ▲2.34 | 2 | ▲2 |
| Legalise Cannabis | 44,754 | 2.88 | ▲0.90 | 1 | ▼1 |
| Australian Christians | 41,348 | 2.66 | ▲0.71 | 1 | ▲1 |
| Independents | 20,795 | 1.34 | ▲1.34 | 0 | 0 |
| Animal Justice Party | 18,803 | 1.21 | ▲0.53 | 1 | ▲1 |
| Sustainable Australia Party | 16,732 | 1.08 | ▲0.77 | 0 | 0 |
| Stop Pedophiles! Protect kiddies! | 14,552 | 0.94 | ▲0.94 | 0 | 0 |
| Shooters, Fishers and Farmers | 13,010 | 0.84 | ▼0.64 | 0 | 0 |
| Libertarian | 9,912 | 0.64 | 0.00 | 0 | 0 |
| Ungrouped Independents | 2,458 | 0.16 | ▲0.16 | 0 | 0 |
| Total | 1,554,107 | 100.00 | – | 37 | – |
| Valid votes | 1,554,107 | 97.07 | ▼0.98 | | |
| Invalid/blank votes | 46,860 | 2.93 | ▲0.98 | | |
| Total votes | 1,600,967 | 100.00 | – | | |
| Registered voters/turnout | 1,868,936 | 85.66 | ▲0.16 | | |

== Full results ==
Vote tallies given are first preferences. Vote transfers changed these numbers in many cases and seats were allocated in accordance with the new totals.

2025 Western Australian state election: Legislative Council
| Party | Candidate | Votes | % | ±% |
|---|---|---|---|---|
| Quota | | 40,898 | | |
| Labor | 1. Jackie Jarvis (elected 1); 2. Matthew Swinbourn (elected 8); 3. Stephen Dawson (elected 12); 4. Kate Doust (elected 15); 5. Pierre Yang (elected 18); 6. Samantha Rowe (elected 20); 7. Alanna Clohesy (elected 22); 8. Ayor Makur Chuot (elected 24); 9. Andrew O'Donnell (elected 26); 10. Katrina Stratton (elected 28); 11. Lauren Cayoun (elected 30); 12. Klara Andric (elected 31); 13. Parwinder Kaur (elected 32); 14. Sandra Carr (elected 33); 15. Dan Caddy (elected 34); 16. Klasey Hirst (elected 36); 17. Peter Foster; 18. Mat Dixon; 19. Lorna Harper; 20. Rosetta Sahanna; 21. Henny Smith; 22. Shelley Payne; 23. Eloyise Braskic; 24. Claire Comrie; 25. Jess Cunnold; 26. Ebony Short; 27. Shenae Hunter; 28. Ashley Buck; 29. Melinda Perks; 30. Gareth Thomas; 31. Daniella Simatos; 32. Emily Bailey; 33. Tim Grey-Smith; 34. Mark Fahey; 35. Maitham Al-Alyawy; 36. Adelaide Kidson; 37. Susan Pethick | 635,537 | 40.89 | −19.44 |
| Liberal | 1. Simon Ehrenfeld (elected 2); 2. Nick Goiran (elected 9); 3. Steve Thomas (elected 13); 4. Phil Twiss (elected 16); 5. Steve Martin (elected 19); 6. Neil Thomson (elected 21); 7. Tjorn Sibma (elected 23); 8. Michelle Hofmann (elected 25); 9. Michelle Boylan (elected 27); 10. Anthony Spagnolo (elected 29); 11. Kathryn Jackson; 12. Dean Wicken; 13. Amanda-Sue Markham; 14. Ka-Ren Chew; 15. Xavier Garbin; 16. Suzanne Migdale; 17. Randall Starling; 18. Gabi Ghasseb | 422,655 | 27.20 | +9.52 |
| Greens | 1. Brad Pettitt (elected 3); 2. Sophie McNeill (elected 10); 3. Tim Clifford (elected 14); 4. Jess Beckerling (elected 17); 5. Diane Evers; 6. Clint Uink; 7. Simone Collins; 8. Alex Wallace; 9. Verity Ives | 170,052 | 10.94 | +4.56 |
| National | 1. Julie Freeman (elected 4); 2. Rob Horstman (elected 11); 3. Julie Kirby; 4. Heidi Tempra; 5. Ben Simpkins; 6. Andrew McRae; 7. Debbie Carson; 8. Peter Gordon; 9. Leonie Lemmey; 10. Jemma August | 84,203 | 5.42 | +2.62 |
| One Nation | 1. Rod Caddies (elected 5); 2. Phil Scott (elected 35); 3. Parminder Singh; 4. Constantin Ortheil; 5. Kat White | 59,296 | 3.82 | +2.34 |
| Legalise Cannabis | 1. Brian Walker (elected 6); 2. Melissa D'Ath; 3. Craig Buchanan; 4. Frances Barns; 5. William Safar; 6. Jason Meotti; 7. Rob Caruso; 8. Fiona Caruso | 44,754 | 2.88 | +0.90 |
| Christians | 1. Maryka Groenewald (elected 7); 2. Mike Crichton; 3. Louis Hildebrandt; 4. Gloria Watkins; 5. Neil Fearis | 41,348 | 2.66 | +0.71 |
| Independent | 1. Sophia Moermond; 2. Louise Kingston; 3. Aussie Trump; 4. Adrian Perrot; 5. Tony Ball | 20,795 | 1.34 | +1.34 |
| Animal Justice | 1. Amanda Dorn (elected 37); 2. Nathalie Bergon; 3. Michael Anagno; 4. Emma Madle; 5. Jemma Fittock | 18,803 | 1.21 | +0.53 |
| Sustainable Australia | 1. Daniel Minson; 2. Julie Matheson; 3. Melissa Wood; 4. Ann Choong; 5. Colin Scott; 6. Prok Vasilyev; 7. Karen Oborn; 8. David Smyth; 9. Jane Loveday; 10. Ryan Oostryck | 16,732 | 1.08 | +1.01 |
| Stop Pedophiles | 1. H. Dolan; 2. A. Wilson; 3. A. Middleton; 4. Georges Dib; 5. K. McLennan; 6. Jataia Peart; 7. Sean King; 8. Tiffany Marks; 9. Peter Smith; 10. Tammy Ward; 11. R. Kobryn-Coletti; 12. H. Grave; 13. M. Nielsen; 14. B. Baker; 15. T. Hewson; 16. C. Smith; 17. S. James | 14,552 | 0.94 | +0.94 |
| Shooters, Fishers, Farmers | 1. Stuart Ostle; 2. Karrie Louden; 3. Peter Raffaelli; 4. Jack Carmody; 5. Clinton Thomas | 13,010 | 0.84 | −0.64 |
| Libertarian | 1. Ryan Burns; 2. Gary Nicol; 3. Jake McCoull; 4. Dean Covich; 5. Angela Williams; 6. Yan Loh; 7. Trevor Barnes | 9,912 | 0.64 | +0.00 |
| Independent | Peter McLernon | 654 | 0.04 | +0.04 |
| Independent | Christiane Smith | 601 | 0.04 | +0.04 |
| Independent | Steve Walker | 563 | 0.04 | +0.04 |
| Independent | Sudhir Sudhir | 368 | 0.02 | +0.02 |
| Independent | Jennifer McRae | 272 | 0.02 | +0.02 |
| Total formal votes | | 1,554,107 | 97.07 | −0.98 |
| Informal votes | | 46,860 | 2.93 | +0.98 |
| Turnout | | 1,600,967 | 85.66 | +0.16 |
