= Candidates of the 2021 Western Australian state election =

Australian state election

The 2021 Western Australian state election was held on 13 March 2021.

== Redistribution and seat changes ==
A redistribution was completed in 2019. Although no seats notionally changed hands, the Labor-held seat of Girrawheen was renamed Landsdale.

A rearrangement of Labor's Legislative Council tickets saw South Metropolitan MLC Pierre Yang contest North Metropolitan, while North Metropolitan MLC Alannah MacTiernan contested South West.

Shooters, Fishers and Farmers Agricultural MLC Rick Mazza contested South West.

== Retiring MPs ==
=== Labor ===
- Janine Freeman MLA (Mirrabooka) – announced 25 November 2020
- Josie Farrer MLA (Kimberley) – announced 18 August 2020
- Fran Logan MLA (Cockburn) – announced 31 August 2020
- Mick Murray MLA (Collie-Preston) – announced 9 February 2020
- Peter Watson MLA (Albany) – announced 10 February 2020
- Ben Wyatt MLA (Victoria Park) – announced 16 November 2020
- Adele Farina MLC (South West) – lost preselection, announced retirement 26 June 2020
- Laurie Graham MLC (Agricultural) – announced 21 July 2020

=== Liberal ===
- John McGrath MLA (South Perth) – announced 30 October 2019
- Mike Nahan MLA (Riverton) – announced 2 December 2019
- Dean Nalder MLA (Bateman) – announced 1 December 2020
- Ken Baston MLC (Mining and Pastoral) – announced 2 December 2019
- Simon O'Brien MLC (South Metropolitan) – lost preselection 3 February 2020, did not renominate

=== Nationals ===
- Jacqui Boydell MLC (Mining and Pastoral) – announced 21 February 2020
- Colin Holt MLC (South West) – announced 19 August 2020

=== Greens ===
- Robin Chapple MLC (Mining and Pastoral) – announced 27 February 2020

== Legislative Assembly ==
Incumbent members are shown in bold text. Successful candidates are highlighted in the relevant colour.

Electorate	Held by	Labor candidate	Liberal candidate	National candidate	Greens candidate	One Nation candidate	Other candidates
Albany	Labor	Rebecca Stephens	Scott Leary	Delma Baesjou	Nelson Gilmour	Michelle Kinsella	Emil Bacanaru (WAxit); Caroline Cull (LCWA); Malcolm Dodson (LDP); Karrie Louden (SFFP); Sandra Madeo (NMVP); Barry Purcell (Sus); Ian 't Hart (AC)
Armadale	Labor	**Tony Buti**	Mahesh Arumugam		Jessica Openshaw	Jayden Carr	Blake Clarke (WAP); Arthur Kleyn (AC); Eby Mathew (WAxit); Lisa Moody (NMVP)
Balcatta	Labor	**David Michael**	Wayne Evans		Benedict Guinery		Rose Anderson (AC); Damian Coletta (LDP); Domenic Staltari (WAxit); Daniel Thornton (NMVP)
Baldivis	Labor	**Reece Whitby**	Luke Derrick		Jody Freeman	Martin Suter	David Marshall (LDP); Brianna McLernon (WAxit); Chaz Rizzo (NMVP); Andrea Tokaji (Ind)
Bassendean	Labor	**Dave Kelly**	Felicia Adeniyi		Charles Pratt	Lesley Pallister	Leni Erceg (NMVP); Peter Martin (WAxit); Dean Powell (AC)
Bateman	Liberal	Kim Giddens	Matt Woodall		Adam Abdul Razak	Barry Mason	Steve Kepert (Ind); Bill Koul (WAP); Gregory Leech (LDP); Fiona McKenzie-Brown (AC); Christina Tseng (NMVP)
Belmont	Labor	**Cassie Rowe**	Charlotte Butler		Clint Uink	Chris Fenech	Mohammed Boksmati (WAxit); Nitasha Naidu (AC); Shaun Rose (NMVP)
Bicton	Labor	**Lisa O'Malley**	Nicole Robins		Annie Hill Otness	Jonathon Graham	Silvia Hirsbrunner (NMVP); Deonne Kingsford (AC); Michael Prinz (LDP)
Bunbury	Labor	**Don Punch**	Matt Foreman	Codee-Lee Down	Patricia Perks	Gail Jones	Dan Acatinca (WAxit); Shane Hastie (SFFP); Kelly Hibbert (LCWA); James Minson (Sus); Anthony Merrifield (NMVP); Kieran Noonan (WAP)
Burns Beach	Labor	**Mark Folkard**	Trish Botha		Louis Marchant		Meredith Campbell (NMVP); Graeme Offereins (AC); Peter Rosengrave (WAxit)
Butler	Labor	**John Quigley**	Linda Aitken		Elizabeth Kamara		Raj Bawa (WAxit); P. Becker (NMVP); Katrina Hildebrandt (AC)
Cannington	Labor	**Bill Johnston**	Bruce Henderson		River Clarke	Gabrielle Iriks	June Cahill (NMVP); Eric Ondra (LDP); Mark Staer (AC)
Carine	Liberal	Paul Lilburne	**Tony Krsticevic**		Nicholas D'Alonzo		A. Cox (NMVP); Marilyn Tringas (WAxit)
Central Wheatbelt	National	Michelle Nelson	Rob Forster	**Mia Davies**	Annabelle Newbury	Shaun Reid	Brendon Cahill (NMVP); Estelle Gom (WAxit); Dennis Pease (AC); Stuart Singleton (SFFP)
Churchlands	Liberal	Christine Tonkin	**Sean L'Estrange**		Mark Twiss		Jim Bivoltsis (Ind); Alexandra Farsalas (WAxit); Ray Moran (AC); L. Pearce (NMVP)
Cockburn	Labor	David Scaife	Owen Mulder		Jesse Smith	Igor Mironenko	Andrew Baker (WAxit); Brian Murray (LDP); Elspeth Taimre (NMVP)
Collie-Preston	Labor	Jodie Hanns	Jane Goff	Wayne Sanford	Gordon Scantlebury	Michael Williams	Graham Butler (Sus); Christine Merrifield (NMVP); Russell Sheridan (Ind); Clinton Thomas (SFFP); Jackie Tomic (WAxit); Emily Wilkinson (LCWA)
Cottesloe	Liberal	Gemma West	**David Honey**		Theresa Moss		Paul Batsioudis (WAxit); R. Drayton (NMVP); Tony Parker (Ind)
Darling Range	Liberal	Hugh Jones	**Alyssa Hayden**		Matthew Lacey	Anthony Fenech	Brett Clarke (WAP); Judith Congrene (NMVP); Eric Eikelboom (AC); Dean Strautins (Ind); Alan Svilicic (WAxit); Matthew Thompson (LDP)
Dawesville	Liberal	Lisa Munday	**Zak Kirkup**	Patricia Leake	Stewart Godden	Kerry Gilmour	Bradley Chalke (LDP); Mark Charles (LCWA); Melissa Oancea (WAxit); Karen Oborn (Sus); Peter Stacey (SFFP); Elijah Stonehouse (NMVP)
Forrestfield	Labor	**Stephen Price**	George Tilbury		Beth McMullan	Roger Barnett (disendorsed)	Owen Doye (WAP); Peter Lampard (AC); Cameron Peters (NMVP); Mohammod Shahalam (WAxit)
Fremantle	Labor	**Simone McGurk**	Miquela Riley		Liberty Cramer		Rod Grljusich (Ind); Janetia Knapp (WAP); Carl Schelling (LDP); W. Schulze (NMVP); Sam Wainwright (SA)
Geraldton	Liberal	Lara Dalton	Rob Dines	**Ian Blayney**	Matt Roberts	Bruce Davies	Andrew Genovese (LDP); Bey Bey Kung (WAxit); Mark Long (NMVP); Chris Mellon (SFFP)
Hillarys	Liberal	Caitlin Collins	**Peter Katsambanis**		Greg Glazov		Zoran Jankulovski (WAxit); W. Seeto (NMVP); Rick Tylka (LFC); Katrina Winfield (LCWA)
Jandakot	Labor	**Yaz Mubarakai**	Mihael McCoy		Heather Lonsdale	Dominic Kelly	P. Hallifax (NMVP); Damon Miles (LDP); Marianne Pretorius (AC); Jagdip Singh (WAxit)
Joondalup	Labor	**Emily Hamilton**	Sheldon Ingham		Angelo Watts		Howard Davey (NMVP); Shanthi Hildebrandt (AC); Peter McLoughlin (LDP); Ziggi Murphy (Ind); Jules Rikkers (WAxit); Bret Treasure (LCWA); Peter Westcott (WAP)
Kalamunda	Labor	**Matthew Hughes**	Liam Staltari		Lee-Anne Miles	Maureen Butters	Robert Ellis (WAxit); Michael Fane (NMVP); Stephen Phelan (WAP); Carolyn Trigwell (LDP); Brady Williams (AC)
Kalgoorlie	Liberal	Ali Kent	**Kyran O'Donnell**	Rowena Olsen	Alex Wallace	Patrick Redreau	Rustu Buyukcakar (WAxit); Jack Carmody (SFFP); Enrico Piazza (NMVP); Sam Rennie (LDP)
Kimberley	Labor	Divina D'Anna	Geoff Haerewa	Millie Hills	Naomi Pigram	Roger Modolo	Karl Fehlauer (WAP); A. Herman (NMVP); Kai Jones (Ind)
Kingsley	Labor	**Jessica Stojkovski**	Scott Edwardes		Isabella Tripp	Concetta Webber	Lynda Crawford (NMVP); Dianne McGarry (WAxit)
Kwinana	Labor	**Roger Cook**	Bianca Talbot		Lauren Rickert	Steven Summerell	Christopher Burnet (WAxit); Verikat Devarapalli (WAP); Connie Portelli (NMVP); Christopher Vellnagel (LDP)
Landsdale	Labor	**Margaret Quirk**	Brett Raponi		Katrina House		Leah Beedham (NMVP); Shailee Desai (WAP); Sareeta Doobree (WAxit)
Mandurah	Labor	**David Templeman**	Ryan Burns	Cons Ortheil	Xanthe Turner	Haydn Regterschot	Rodney Beaton (LCWA); Ian Blevin (SFFP); Gavin Farbey (Ind); Samy Spinola (NMVP); Katherine Summers (Sus); Marius Timis (WAxit)
Maylands	Labor	**Lisa Baker**	Justin Iemma		Emma Pringle	Maria Andreeva	Carmel Addink (NMVP); Peter Baker (WAxit); Gaye Burnett (AC)
Midland	Labor	**Michelle Roberts**	Jo Cicchini		Brendan Sturcke	Teresa Olow	Brad Bedford (WAP); Mohit Bhasin (WAxit); Steve Kelly (NMVP); Ester Nabate (AC)
Mirrabooka	Labor	Meredith Hammat	Aaron Sawmadal		Mark Cooper	Michael Mabood	Jessica Ayre (NMVP); Devinder Chhina (WAxit); Peter Dunne (Ind); Kim Mubarak (Ind); Dwight Randall (AC)
Moore	National	Barni Norton	Darren Slyns	**Shane Love**	Brian Spittles	Ian Frizzell	T. Asmutaitis (NMVP); Richard Banka (WAxit); Ross Williamson (SFFP)
Morley	Labor	**Amber-Jade Sanderson**	Jim Seth		Thomas Marcinkowski	Julian Scully	Rhonda Kerslake (NMVP); Aman Singh (WAxit); Alan Wells (AC)
Mount Lawley	Labor	**Simon Millman**	Suzanne Migdale		Lucy Nicol	Herbie Schaal	Russell Goodrick (WAP); Ellen Joubert (AC); Gurjant Sangha (WAxit); John Watt (NMVP)
Murray-Wellington	Labor	**Robyn Clarke**	Michelle Boylan	Leonie Lemmey	Vince Puccio	Bernie Wansbrough	Andrew Brown (Sus); Shaun Carney (LCWA); Dinko Golem (WAxit); Aimee Herriot (NMVP); Mark McCall (SFFP); Jayden Staszewski (LDP)
Nedlands	Liberal	Katrina Stratton	**Bill Marmion**		Tamara Alderdice		Fiona Argyle (Ind); Vivien Forrest (NMVP); Dennis Jennings (WAxit); Andrew Mangano (Ind)
North West Central	National	Cherie Sibosado	Alys McKeough	**Vince Catania**	Sandy Burt	Robert Tonkin	A. Agyputri (NMVP); Stefan Colagiuri (SFFP); Brendan McKay (WAxit); Henry Seddon (Ind)
Perth	Labor	**John Carey**	Kylee Veskovich		Francesca Pandolfino		Scott Beard (NMVP); Angelo Minniti (WAxit)
Pilbara	Labor	**Kevin Michel**	Camilo Blanco	Scott Bourne	Machelle Vaughan-Cartner	Sandi Crouch	David Allison-Forrest (SFFP); Max Elliott (NMVP); Don Hyland (WAP); Navneet Jawanda (WAxit)
Riverton	Liberal	Jags Krishnan	Anthony Spagnolo		Simon Blackburn		Dena Gower (AC); Chris Holman (LDP); Terry Lee (WAP); Penelope Scull (NMVP)
Rockingham	Labor	**Mark McGowan**	Michael McClure		Breanna Morgan	Geoff George	Tom Hawkins (NMVP); Dean Lofts (LDP)
Roe	National	Bradley Willis	David Dwyer	**Peter Rundle**	Nikki Starr	Graham Bushby	Gary Jammu (WAxit); Cathie Kelly (AC); Bevan Steele (SFFP); Nita Thakrar (NMVP)
Scarborough	Liberal	Stuart Aubrey	**Liza Harvey**		SP Becker		Johnny Boccardi (WAxit); Daniel Bridgewater (LFC); Troy Coward (WAP); Vanya Markovina (NMVP); Dave Vos (Ind)
South Perth	Liberal	Geoff Baker	Ryan Chorley		Mark Brogan		Dwain Hill (NMVP); Jack Taylor (LDP)
Southern River	Labor	**Terry Healy**	Ruben Zandman		Simone Collins	Malcolm Heffernan	Wesley Du Preez (LDP); Katie Hawkes (NMVP); Shazi Siddiqui (WAxit); Gerard Spoelstra (AC); Julia Walsh (Ind)
Swan Hills	Labor	**Jessica Shaw**	Rod Henderson		Melanye Wawrik		Asif Ali (WAxit); Timothy Bunton (NMVP); Magdeleen Strauss (AC)
Thornlie	Labor	**Chris Tallentire**	Kevin McDonald		Rachel Wright		Madeleine Goiran (AC); Rachael Hall (NMVP); JS Masih (WAxit)
Vasse	Liberal	Chris Hossen	**Libby Mettam**	Peter Gordon	Mia Krasenstein	Jackson Wreford	A. W. Judd (NMVP); Nicolas Oancea (WAxit); Neridah Rich (LCWA); Brad Satchell (Sus); Cameron Van Veen (SFFP)
Victoria Park	Labor	Hannah Beazley	Amanda-Sue Markham		Gerard Siero	Darren Sandow	Sue-Ann Connolly (NMVP); Aaron Farrell (LDP); Janine Vander Ven (AC)
Wanneroo	Labor	**Sabine Winton**	Paul Miles		Matthew Ward		J. Bullock (NMVP); Sandy Culum-Buzak (WAxit); Lilian Siviour (WAP)
Warnbro	Labor	**Paul Papalia**	Mark Jones		Robert Delves	Liam Hall	Cameron McMaster (LDP); Brandon Suchalla-Young (NMVP); Bob Velev (WAxit)
Warren-Blackwood	National	Jane Kelsbie	Marie O'Dea	**Terry Redman**	Jeff Pow	Steven Regterschot	Helen Allan (NMVP); Paul Da Silva (SFFP); Nick Lethbridge (LCWA); Peter Strachan (Sus)
West Swan	Labor	**Rita Saffioti**	Dave Nesbit		Manjot Singh		Genevieve Cocliff (NMVP); Lucky Saini (WAxit); Brian Warburton (AC)
Willagee	Labor	**Peter Tinley**	Barry Jones		Felicity Townsend	Mark Dalrymple	Michael Mitchell (LDP); Susan Poole (NMVP)

== Legislative Council ==
Six candidates are elected in each region. Incumbent members are shown in bold text. Tickets that elected at least one MLC are highlighted in the relevant colour. Successful candidates are identified by an asterisk (*).

=== Agricultural region ===
The Labor Party was defending two seats. The Liberal Party was defending one seat. The National Party was defending two seats. The Shooters, Fishers and Farmers Party was defending one seat.

Labor candidates	Liberal candidates	National candidates	Greens candidates	One Nation candidates	SFF candidates
1. **Darren West***; 2. Shelley Payne*; 3. Sandra Carr*; 4. Luke Clarkson	1. Steve Martin*; 2. Kathryn Jackson; 3. **Jim Chown**; 4. Maria Girak; 5. Brett Jackson	1. **Colin de Grussa***; 2. **Martin Aldridge***; 3. Natasha Colliver; 4. Steve Blyth; 5. Rob Horstman; 6. Ian Hanna	1. Peter Leam; 2. Vivienne Glance	1. Rod Caddies; 2. Emma McKinley	1. Stuart Ostle; 2. Ronald Lean
HAP candidates	WAP candidates	Christians candidates	Sustainable candidates	WAxit candidates	GAP candidates
1. Bass Tadros; 2. Svetlana Ivanchenko	1. Michael O'Loghlen; 2. Allan Butson	1. Trevor Young; 2. Les Holten	1. Greg Norris; 2. James Fowler	1. Russell Sewell; 2. Simon Glossop	1. Lawrie Carr; 2. Shane Edwards
DSP candidates	LCWA candidates	AJP candidates	LFC candidates	LDP candidates	NMVP candidates
1. Brett Tucker; 2. Andrew Wilson	1. Leo Treasure; 2. Keith Clinton	1. Courtney Henry; 2. Roberta Vlaar	1. Peter Turner; 2. Nathan Thomson	1. Connor Whittle; 2. Cameron Puttick	1. Aaron Horsman; 2. Jessica Young
Group O candidates	Ungrouped candidates				
1. Felly Chandra; 2. Chelsea Henderson	JM David; Parminder Singh	Les Mirco; Peter Wallis	Steven Hopkins; Andrew Ballantyne		

=== East Metropolitan Region ===
The Labor Party was defending three seats. The Liberal Party was defending one seat. The Greens were defending one seat. One Nation was defending one seat, although sitting MLC Charles Smith defected to the Western Australia Party.

Labor candidates	Liberal candidates	Greens candidates	One Nation candidates	WAP candidates	SFFP candidates
1. **Alanna Clohesy***; 2. **Samantha Rowe***; 3. **Matthew Swinbourn***; 4. Lorna Harper*; 5. Robert Green; 6. John Keogh	1. **Donna Faragher***; 2. Phil Twiss; 3. Greg Halls; 4. Daniel Newman; 5. Jeremy Quinn	1. **Tim Clifford**; 2. Caroline Perks; 3. Callan Gray	1. Dale Grillo; 2. Tim Orr	1. **Charles Smith**; 2. James Anthony	1. Trevor Ruwoldt; 2. Coby Thomas
WAxit candidates	HAP candidates	Sustainable candidates	Christians candidates	GAP candidates	NMVP candidates
1. Satinder Samra; 2. Robin Singh; 3. Monty Singh	1. Lidia Skorokhod; 2. Lisa Rowe	1. Nicole Watts; 2. Keith Lethbridge	1. Maryka Groenewald; 2. Jamie van Burgel	1. Ben Tilbury; 2. Bradley Ward	1. Patricia Ayre; 2. Daniel Hall
LCWA candidates	DSP candidates	LFC candidates	AJP candidates	LDP candidates	Group A candidates
1. Brian Walker*; 2. Karl Reinmuth	1. James McManus; 2. Mark Bradley	1. Marilyn Lottering; 2. Raoul Smith	1. Amanda Dorn; 2. Nicole Arielli	1. Craig Buchanan; 2. Neil Hamilton	1. David Larsen; 2. Brian Brightman
Ungrouped candidates
Hayley Doan; Peter Lyndon-James

=== Mining and Pastoral Region ===
The Labor Party was defending two seats. The Liberal Party was defending one seat. The National Party was defending one seat. The Greens were defending one seat. One Nation was defending one seat.

Labor candidates	Liberal candidates	National candidates	Greens candidates	One Nation candidates	WAP candidates
1. **Stephen Dawson***; 2. **Kyle McGinn***; 3. Peter Foster*; 4. Rosetta Sahanna*; 5. Kelvin Portland; 6. Bobby-Lee Field	1. Neil Thomson*; 2. Michael Huston; 3. Jodie Richardson; 4. Matt Blampey	1. Nick Fardell; 2. Lionel Quartermaine; 3. Tony Crook; 4. Kieran Dart; 5. Mark Young; 6. Tessa Daly	1. Kimberly Smith; 2. Giz Watson	1. **Robin Scott**; 2. David Modolo	1. Dave Grills; 2. Julie Matheson
SFF candidates	Christians candidates	HAP candidates	WAxit candidates	Sustainable candidates	GAP candidates
1. Matt Priest; 2. Royce Normington; 3. Kingsley Smith	1. Jacky Young; 2. Ross Patterson	1. Teddy Craies; 2. Simon Martin	1. Brenden Hatton; 2. Huw Grossmith	1. Brian Mollan; 2. Anthony Park	1. Nathan Webb-Smith; 2. Laona Mullings
DSP candidates	AJP candidates	LDP candidates	LCWA candidates	NMVP candidates	LFC candidates
1. Wilson Tucker*; 2. Janet Wilson	1. Emmarae Cole-Darby; 2. Scott Dunning	1. Robbie Parr; 2. Jake McCoull	1. James Brown; 2. Donald Watt	1. Andrew Middleton; 2. Deborah Middleton	1. Curtis Greening; 2. Gavin McFerran
Group A candidates	Group H candidates	Group M candidates			
1. Tayla Squires; 2. Cameron Gardiner	1. Christine Kelly; 2. Noel McGinniss	1. Anthony Fels; 2. Van Son Le			

=== North Metropolitan Region ===
The Labor Party was defending two seats. The Liberal Party was defending three seats. The Greens were defending one seat.

Labor candidates	Liberal candidates	Greens candidates	One Nation candidates	LDP candidates	SFF candidates
1. **Pierre Yang***; 2. **Martin Pritchard***; 3. Ayor Makur Chuot*; 4. Dan Caddy*; 5. Rhys Vallance; 6. Rebeka Marton	1. **Peter Collier***; 2. **Tjorn Sibma***; 3. Simon Ehrenfeld; 4. Tim Walton; 5. **Michael Mischin**	1. **Alison Xamon**; 2. Daniel Vujcich; 3. Sarah Newbold	1. Tyler Walsh; 2. Sheila Mundy	1. Kate Fantinel; 2. Richard Tait	1. Jan van Niekerk; 2. Marty Wenham
HAP candidates	WAxit candidates	Christians candidates	Sustainable candidates	WAP candidates	GAP candidates
1. Sanjeev Gupta; 2. George Helou	1. John Golawski; 2. Aleksandra Sommer	1. Louis Hildebrandt; 2. Neil Fearis	1. Colin Scott; 2. Michael Ferrinda	1. Elizabeth Re; 2. Steven Pynt	1. Chris Irwin; 2. Ben Tonkin
NMVP candidates	AJP candidates	LCWA candidates	LFC candidates	DSP candidates	Group F candidates
1. James Pearce; 2. A. Cirkovic; 3. Sara O'Dal	1. Michael Anagno; 2. Stephanie Fry	1. Max Armstrong-Moore; 2. Fred Mulholland	1. Daithi Gleeson; 2. Paul Holliday	1. Robert Tucker; 2. Heather Atcheson	1. Rafe Roberts; 2. Carel Husselmann
Group K candidates	Group L candidates	Group R candidates	Group T candidates	Ungrouped candidates	
1. Michael Tucak; 2. John Tucak	1. Andrea Randle; 2. Wvendy Chan	1. N. Spada; 2. M. Husselmann	1. Billy Amesz; 2. Steven Gersbach	T. Ravichandar	

=== South Metropolitan Region ===
The Labor Party was defending three seats. The Liberal Party was defending two seats. The Liberal Democrats were defending one seat.

Labor candidates	Liberal candidates	Greens candidates	One Nation candidates	LDP candidates	SFF candidates
1. **Sue Ellery***; 2. **Kate Doust***; 3. Klara Andric*; 4. Stephen Pratt*; 5. Victoria Helps; 6. Kelly McManus	1. **Nick Goiran***; 2. Michelle Hofmann; 3. Ka-ren Chew; 4. Robert Reid; 5. Nitin Vashisht; 6. Scott Stirling	1. Brad Pettitt*; 2. Lynn MacLaren; 3. Daniel Garlett	1. Philip Scott; 2. Bradley Dickinson	1. **Aaron Stonehouse**; 2. Harvey Smith; 3. Jared Neaves; 4. Ivan Tomshin; 5. Laurentiu Zamfirescu; 6. Peter Leech	1. Steven Tonge; 2. Paul Bedford
Christians candidates	Sustainable candidates	WAxit candidates	WAP candidates	HAP candidates	GAP candidates
1. Warnar Spyker; 2. Sylvia Iradukunda	1. Ryan Oostryck; 2. Jane Loveday	1. Peter McLernon; 2. Jo-Anne Vincent-Barwood	1. Katy Mair; 2. Gavin Waugh	1. Michele Castle; 2. Catheryn Wright	1. Samantha Vinci; 2. Susan Hoddinott
NMVP candidates	DSP candidates	LCWA candidates	AJP candidates	LFC candidates	Socialist candidates
1. Cam Tinley; 2. Michael Fletcher; 3. Greg Bell	1. Amanda Klaj; 2. Craig Curtis	1. Moshe Bernstein; 2. Scott Shortland	1. Colleen Saporita; 2. Katrina Love	1. Keith Pomeroy; 2. Daniel Herron	1. Marianne Mackay; 2. Dirk Kelly
Group A candidates	Group C candidates	Group J candidates	Group Q candidates	Group V candidates	Group W candidates
1. Graham West; 2. Liam Strickland	1. Jourdan Kestel; 2. Lee Herridge	1. Mark Rowley; 2. Marlie Touchell	1. Dave Glossop; 2. Lewis Butto	1. Glen Leslie; 2. Stephen Yarwood	1. Stan Francis; 2. Jeremy Lay
Ungrouped candidates
Leon Hamilton; Larry Foley

=== South West Region ===
The Labor Party was defending two seats. The Liberal Party was defending one seat. The National Party was defending one seat. The Greens were defending one seat. One Nation was defending one seat.

Labor candidates	Liberal candidates	National candidates	Greens candidates	One Nation candidates	SFF candidates
1. **Sally Talbot***; 2. **Alannah MacTiernan***; 3. Jackie Jarvis*; 4. John Mondy; 5. Ben Dawkins; 6. Kylie Fitzgerald	1. **Steve Thomas***; 2. Greg Stocks; 3. Anita Shortland; 4. Hayden Burbidge	1. James Hayward*; 2. Louise Kingston; 3. Rod Pfeiffer	1. **Diane Evers**; 2. Donald Clarke; 3. Jodie Moffat	1. **Colin Tincknell**; 2. Paul Howard; 3. Michael Pelle	1. **Rick Mazza**; 2. Russell McCarthy; 3. Ray Hull
Christians candidates	Sustainable candidates	WAP candidates	GAP candidates	WAxit candidates	HAP candidates
1. Laurence van der Plas; 2. Joan Albany	1. Daniel Minson; 2. Heather Scott	1. Terri Sharp; 2. Joanne Munro	1. Nick Robinson; 2. Andy Gleeson	1. Chas Hopkins; 2. Malcolm Gilmour	1. Justin Zwartkruis; 2. Hayley Green
LCWA candidates	LDP candidates	DSP candidates	AJP candidates	LFC candidates	NMVP candidates
1. Sophia Moermond*; 2. Nicola Johnson	1. Eli Bernstein; 2. David Fishlock	1. Garry Spiers; 2. Lizabeth Taylor	1. Vicki Bailey; 2. Sarah Gould	1. Mark Bentley; 2. Pieter Lottering	1. Keith Bunton; 2. Elizabeth Bluntschli
Group C candidates	Group E candidates	Group U candidates	Ungrouped candidates		
1. John Banks; 2. Phillip Spencer	1. Yasmin Bartlett; 2. Karen Perttula	1. George Seth; 2. Noel Avery	Dave Schumacher; Bob Burdett		

== Disendorsed candidates prior to close of nominations ==
Date	Party	Candidate	Seat	Details
28 January	Liberal	Andrea Tokaji	Baldivis	Resigned Liberal candidacy after it was revealed Andrea Tokaji published 5G/COVID-19 conspiracy beliefs on a conservative website.
