= Members of the Western Australian Legislative Council, 2025–2029 =

This is a list of members of the Western Australian Legislative Council elected in the 2025 Western Australian state election. They were seated on 22 May 2025.

== List ==
| Name | Party | Term in office |
|---|---|---|
| Klara Andric | Labor | 2021–present |
| Jess Beckerling | Greens | 2025–present |
| Michelle Boylan | Liberal | 2025–present |
| Rod Caddies | One Nation | 2025–present |
| Dan Caddy | Labor | 2021–present |
| Sandra Carr | Labor | 2021–present |
| Lauren Cayoun | Labor | 2025–present |
| Tim Clifford | Greens | 2025–present |
| Alanna Clohesy | Labor | 2013–present |
| Stephen Dawson | Labor | 2013–present |
| Amanda Dorn | Animal Justice | 2025–present |
| Kate Doust | Labor | 2001–present |
| Simon Ehrenfeld | Liberal | 2025–present |
| Julie Freeman | National | 2025–present |
| Maryka Groenewald | Australian Christians | 2025–present |
| Klasey Hirst | Labor | 2025–present |
| Michelle Hofmann | Liberal | 2025–present |
| Rob Horstman | National | 2025–present |
| Nick Goiran | Liberal | 2009–present |
| Jackie Jarvis | Labor | 2021–present |
| Ayor Makur Chuot | Labor | 2021–present |
| Sophie McNeill | Greens | 2025–present |
| Steve Martin | Liberal | 2021–present |
| Andrew O'Donnell | Labor | 2025–present |
| Brad Pettitt | Greens | 2021–present |
| Katrina Stratton | Labor | 2025–present |
| Samantha Rowe | Labor | 2013–present |
| Phil Scott | One Nation | 2025–present |
| Tjorn Sibma | Liberal | 2017–present |
| Anthony Spagnolo | Liberal | 2025–present |
| Matthew Swinbourn | Labor | 2017–present |
| Parwinder Kaur | Labor | 2025–present |
| Steve Thomas | Liberal | 2017–present |
| Neil Thomson | Liberal | 2021–present |
| Phil Twiss | Liberal | 2025–present |
| Brian Walker | Legalise Cannabis | 2021–present |
| Pierre Yang | Labor | 2017–present |

== See also ==
- Members of the Western Australian Legislative Assembly, 2025–2029
