= George Cash =

Australian politician

George Cash AM

14th President of the Western Australian Legislative Council
- In office 27 May 1997 – 21 May 2001
- Premier: Richard Court
- Preceded by: Clive Griffiths
- Succeeded by: John Cowdell

Member of the Western Australian Legislative Council
- In office 22 May 1989 – 22 May 2009 Serving with Berinson, Edwards, Piantadosi, Dermer, Travers, Giffard, Burton, Pike, MacLean, Davies, Lightfoot, Cadby, Evans, Halligan, Collier, Hodgson, Watson
- Constituency: North Metropolitan

Member of the Western Australian Legislative Assembly
- In office 17 November 1984 – 22 May 1989
- Preceded by: Ray O'Connor
- Succeeded by: seat abolished
- Constituency: Mount Lawley

Personal details
- Born: Samuel Ernest Cash; 12 September 1946 (age 79) Subiaco, Western Australia
- Party: Liberal Party
- Children: 4 (including Michaelia Cash)
- Education: University of Western Australia

Samuel Ernest "George" Cash AM (born 12 September 1946 in Subiaco, Western Australia) is a former Australian politician. A member of the Liberal Party, he represented Mount Lawley in the Western Australian Legislative Assembly, and later was a member of the Western Australian Legislative Council, representing the North Metropolitan Region.

== Biography ==
Cash was awarded a Bachelor of Laws and then a Master of Laws at the University of Western Australia, later completing a Bachelor of Business. He worked as a business proprietor and a company director before entering parliament.

Prior to entering parliament, Cash was a City of Stirling councillor.

In 1984, he was elected to the Western Australian Legislative Assembly as the member for Mount Lawley at a by-election resulting from the resignation from parliament of then premier Ray O'Connor. Cash was re-elected in 1986 but the seat was abolished in a redistribution in 1988. He then switched to the Western Australian Legislative Council and was elected in the 1989 state election under the new proportional system which came into effect for the council. He served 20 years in that chamber, including four years as President between 1997 and 2001, while Richard Court was Premier, and was for several years thereafter the deputy president. He announced his retirement before the 2008 election, and his term ended on 21 May 2009.

In 2010 Cash was appointed a Member of the Order of Australia for service to the Parliament of Western Australia, and to the community. He is the father of Western Australian Senator Michaelia Cash.

Western Australian Legislative Assembly
Preceded by Ray O'Connor	Member for Mount Lawley; 1984-1889	Succeeded by Constituency abolished
Western Australian Legislative Council
Preceded by Seat created	Member for North Metropolitan; 1989-2009	Succeeded by Seat abolished
Preceded by Clive Griffiths	President of the Western Australian Legislative Council; 1997–2001	Succeeded by John Cowdell
