= Ken Travers =

Australian politician

The Honourable Ken Travers
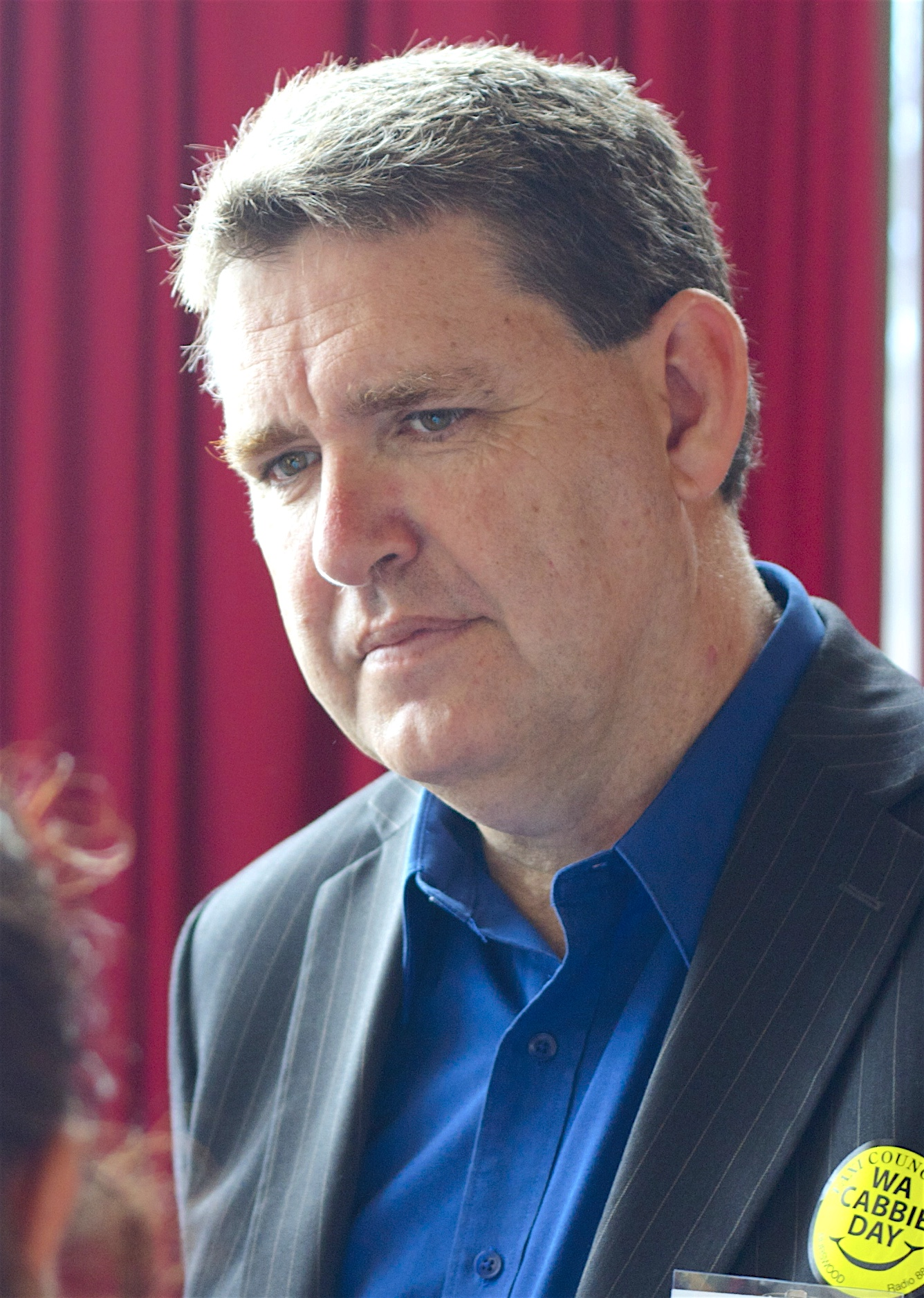
- Travers in 2011

Member of the Legislative Council of Western Australia
- In office 22 May 1997 – 29 August 2016 Serving with Behjat, Burton, Cadby, Cash, Collier, Dermer, Evans, Giffard, Halligan, Hodgson, Katsambanis, Mischin, Pritchard, Ravlich, Watson
- Constituency: North Metropolitan Region

Personal details
- Born: 1 February 1961 (age 65) Bramber, Sussex, England
- Party: Labor

Kenneth Dunstan Elder Travers (born 1 February 1961) is a former Australian politician who was a Labor Party member of the Legislative Council of Western Australia from 1997 to 2016, representing North Metropolitan Region.

== Early life ==
Travers was born in Bramber, Sussex, England, to Ailsa (née Elder) and Laurence John Travers. He is a descendant of Edward Ogilvie, a 19th-century member of the New South Wales Legislative Council. Travers' parents moved to Perth when he was an infant, and he attended Mount Lawley Senior High School. After leaving school, he was employed as a customs officer for several years, and later also as a bus driver. From 1989, he worked as a political adviser and electorate officer, including in the office of Senator Chris Evans.

== Politics ==
Travers was elected to parliament at the 1996 state election, to a term commencing in May 1997. He was immediately included in the shadow ministry of Geoff Gallop. However, when Labor was elected to government at the 2001 election, Travers was not made a minister, but instead only a parliamentary secretary. After the 2005 election, he was made deputy chairman of committees in the Legislative Council, a position which he held until 2013. The Labor government was defeated at the 2008 election, and Travers was included in the shadow ministry formed by the new leader, Eric Ripper. He retained his place when Mark McGowan replaced Ripper as leader in 2012, but resigned from the shadow ministry in June 2015 for personal reasons. Travers retired from parliament in August 2016, and was replaced by Laine McDonald.

== See also ==
- Members of the Western Australian Legislative Council
