= Liz Behjat =

Australian politician

Member of the Legislative Council of Western Australia
- In office 22 May 2009 – 21 May 2017 Serving with Collier, Dermer, Katsambanis, McDonald, Mischin, Pritchard, Ravlich, Travers, Watson
- Constituency: North Metropolitan Region

Personal details
- Born: 30 December 1958 (age 67) Wolverhampton, England
- Party: Liberal

Elizabeth Lloyd Behjat (née Williams; born 30 December 1958) is an Australian politician who was a Liberal Party member of the Legislative Council of Western Australia from 2009 to 2017, representing North Metropolitan Region.

Behjat was born in Wolverhampton, England, where her Welsh-born father, John Williams, was working as a teacher. The family arrived in Western Australia in 1966, and her father entered politics a few years later, serving in the Legislative Council from 1971 to 1989. Behjat attended Scarborough Senior High School and Churchlands Senior High School, and after leaving school initially worked as a law clerk. She was later employed as a conveyancer, an administrative officer, a casino manager (at the Burswood Casino), a para-legal, and an electorate officer. Behjat was elected to parliament at the 2008 state election, running in third place on the Liberal ticket in North Metropolitan. Her term began on 22 May 2009. Behjat was re-elected to a second four-year term in 2013, but she was defeated for Liberal preselection at the 2017 election, meaning her term in the Legislative Council concluded in May 2017.
