= Joe Berinson =

Australian politician (1932–2018)

The Honourable Joe Berinson QC
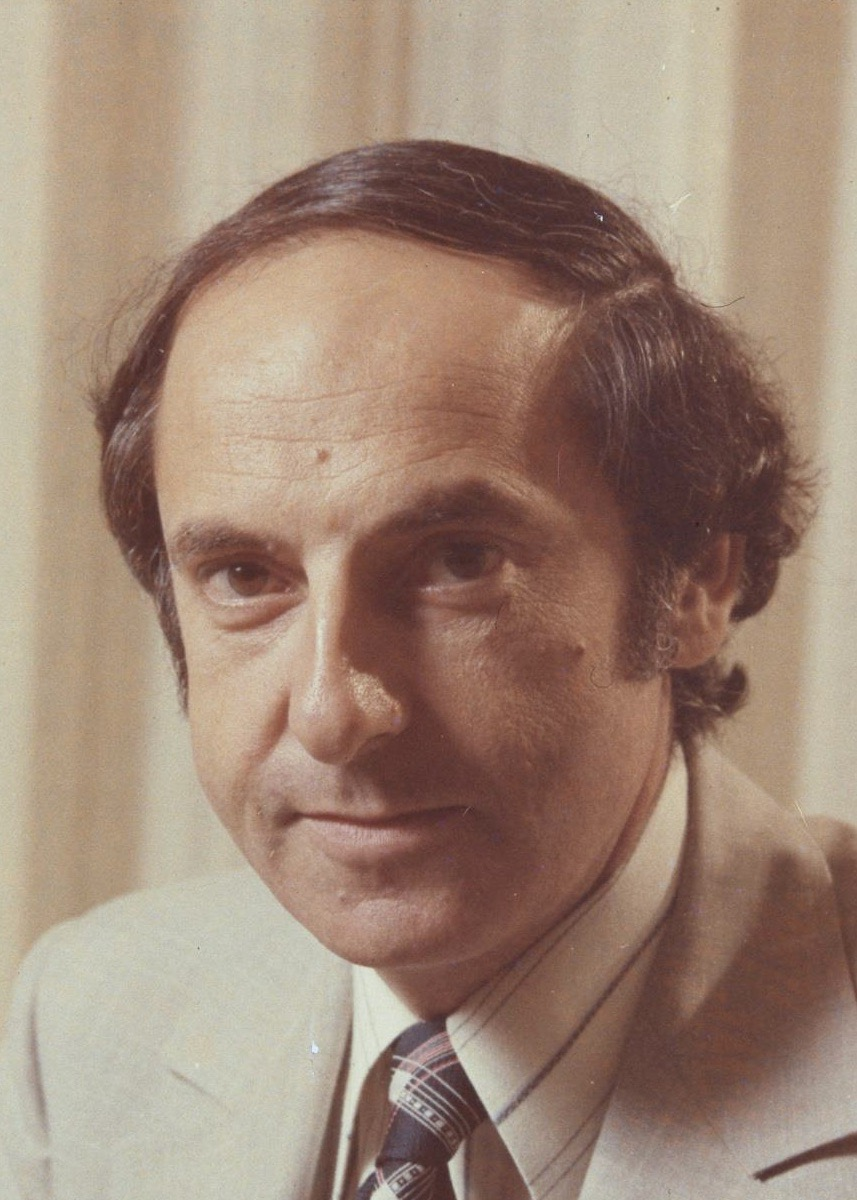
- Berinson in 1975

Minister for the Environment
- In office 14 July 1975 – 11 November 1975
- Prime Minister: Gough Whitlam
- Preceded by: Gough Whitlam
- Succeeded by: Andrew Peacock

Attorney-General of Western Australia
- In office 25 February 1983 – 16 February 1993
- Premier: Brian Burke; Peter Dowding; Carmen Lawrence
- Preceded by: Ian Medcalf
- Succeeded by: Cheryl Edwardes

Member of the Australian House of Representatives
- In office 25 October 1969 – 13 December 1975
- Preceded by: Fred Chaney
- Succeeded by: Ross McLean
- Constituency: Perth

Member of the Western Australian Legislative Council
- In office 21 May 1989 – 30 April 1993 Serving with Graham Edwards, Sam Piantadosi, Bob Pike, Reg Davies, Max Evans, George Cash
- Preceded by: Constituency established
- Succeeded by: Ross Lightfoot
- Constituency: North Metropolitan
- In office 22 May 1983 – 21 May 1989 Serving with Sam Piantadosi
- Preceded by: Constituency established
- Succeeded by: Constituency abolished
- Constituency: North Central Metropolitan
- In office 22 May 1980 – 21 May 1983 Serving with Lyla Elliott
- Preceded by: Don Cooley
- Succeeded by: Fred McKenzie
- Constituency: North-East Metropolitan

Personal details
- Born: Joseph Max Berinson; 7 January 1932 Highgate, Western Australia, Australia
- Died: 2 June 2018 (aged 86) Perth, Western Australia, Australia
- Resting place: Karrakatta Cemetery
- Party: Australian Labor Party
- Spouse: Jeanette Bekhor (m. 1958)
- Children: 4
- Parents: Sam Berinson (father); Rebecca Finklestein (mother)
- Education: Highgate Primary School; Perth Modern School
- Alma mater: University of Western Australia
- Profession: Pharmacist; Lawyer

Joseph Max Berinson (7 January 1932 – 2 June 2018) was an Australian politician who represented the Australian Labor Party (ALP) in the Australian House of Representatives and the Western Australian Legislative Council. He was Minister for the Environment in the Whitlam government for several months in 1975, later serving a decade as Attorney-General of Western Australia.

== Early life ==
Berinson was born on 7 January 1932 in his family home in Highgate, Western Australia, a suburb of Perth. His parents were Shulem (Samuel) Berinson, a master baker, and Rivka (Rebecca) née Finkelstein, both of whom were Palestinian Jews from the city of Safed. His father migrated to Australia in the early 1910s and his mother migrated to Australia in the early to mid 1920s. Berinson had two older sisters, Goola (born 1924) and Ethel (born 1925).

Berinson attended Highgate Primary School and won a scholarship to attend Perth Modern School. After matriculating in 1948, he studied pharmacy at Perth Technical College. He did training at a pharmacy in Forrest Place, where he gained his formative political experience. Forrest Place was the location of many political speeches and rallies, including by Prime Ministers Ben Chifley and Robert Menzies. Berinson labelled Menzies' speech as "very off-putting". In 1953, he graduated, began working as a pharmacist in Mount Lawley, and joined the Mount Lawley branch of the Australian Labor Party. Over the years, he would have various executive roles in the Mount Lawley branch and the state executive.

On 9 September 1958, Berinson married Jeanette Bekhor, whom he met at the Zionist Youth League, at the Perth Synagogue. They had three daughters and one son together. Through the 1950s and 1960s, Berinson built a high-profile within Perth's Jewish community, eventually becoming the co-editor of the Jewish newspaper The Maccabean.

== Federal politics ==
In the 1962 state election, Berinson unsuccessfully stood for the unwinnable electoral district of Mount Lawley, being beaten by the Liberal Party's Ray O'Connor. In the 1963 federal election, Berinson stood for the seat of Swan and was beaten by Richard Cleaver. Deciding that a law degree would help him in politics, Berinson started studying law at the University of Western Australia in 1967. Berinson was finally elected to a parliament on the 25 October 1969 federal election, where he was elected to the seat of Perth in the Australian House of Representatives. He defeated the sitting Liberal member, Fred Chaney Sr.

Berinson still had yet to complete his law degree when he was elected, so he continued his studies whilst a member of parliament and got his exams deferred to 1970. He would study on the plane to and from Canberra and in the Parliament House Library late at night. His lecturers would tape their presentations that Berinson was unable to attend. He finished the degree by the end of 1970, winning the H. C. F. Keall Prize for best fourth-year law student and the J. A. Wood Prize for best student in the humanities.

Berinson was re-elected in the 1972 federal election, in which Gough Whitlam was elected prime minister. Berinson was not elected to the ministry and did not expect to either, but Whitlam was disappointed that he was not elected to the ministry.

He was elected chairman of committees in February 1975. He was then appointed Minister for the Environment in July 1975, serving until the government's dismissal on 11 November 1975 and then losing his seat in the December 1975 election. After Berinson's defeat in 1975, he was admitted as a legal practitioner in 1977.

== State politics ==
In 1980, Berinson was elected to the Western Australian Legislative Council representing the Council electorates of North-East Metropolitan (1980–1983), North Central Metropolitan (1983–1989) and North Metropolitan (1989–1993). With the election of Brian Burke as Premier of Western Australia in 1983, Berinson was appointed Attorney-General. He served in this role under successive premiers Burke, Peter Dowding and Carmen Lawrence. While Attorney-General, he was appointed Queen's Counsel (QC) in 1988.

In 1991, he was identified as one of five members of the government most associated with WA Inc transactions.

== Later life ==
From 2001 to 2005, Berinson served as the president of the Jewish Community Council of Western Australia.

Berinson died on 2 June 2018, aged 86. His burial took place the following day at Karrakatta Cemetery. He was survived by his wife Jeanette and their four children.

== Notes ==
Australian House of Representatives
Preceded by Fred Chaney	Member for Perth; 25 October 1969 – 13 December 1975	Succeeded by Ross McLean
Political offices
Preceded by Gough Whitlam	Minister for the Environment; 14 July 1975 – 11 November 1975	Succeeded by Andrew Peacock
Preceded by Ian Medcalf	Attorney-General of Western Australia; 25 February 1983 – 16 February 1993	Succeeded by Cheryl Edwardes
