= Akec Makur Chuot =

Australian rules footballer (born 1992)

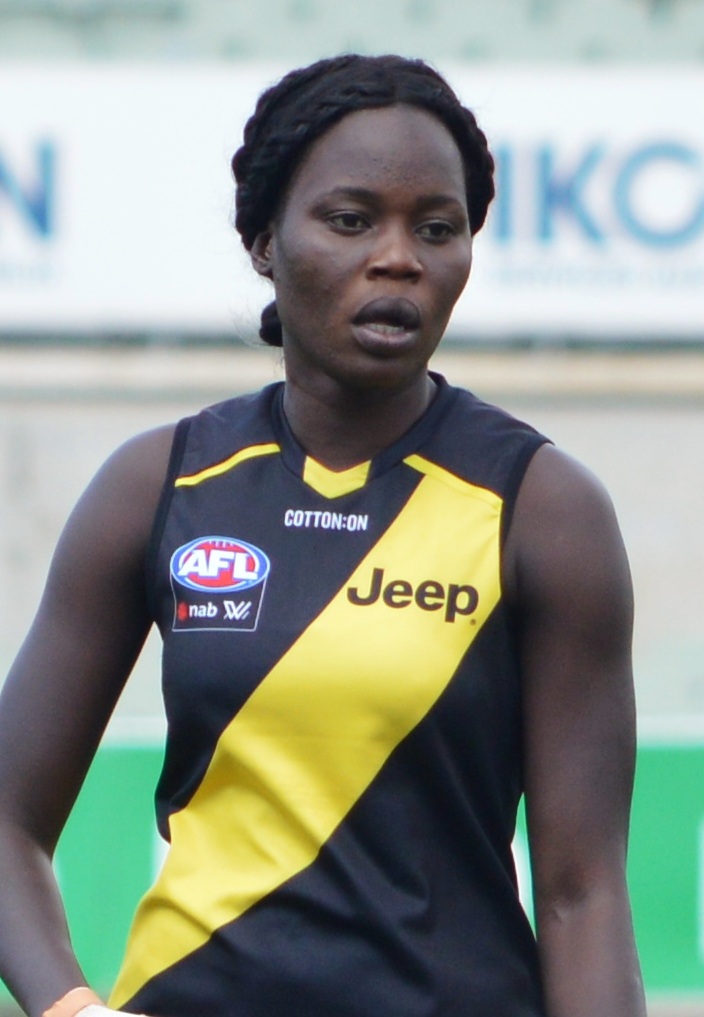
- Makur Chuot with Richmond in February 2020

Personal information
- Born: 5 September 1992 (age 34); Yirol, South Sudan
- Original team: Swan Districts (WAWFL)
- Draft: No. 139, 2016 AFL Women's draft
- Debut: Round 1, 2017, Fremantle vs. Western Bulldogs, at VU Whitten Oval
- Height: 178 cm (5 ft 10 in)
- Position: Half-back

Playing career^{1}
Years	Club	Games (Goals)
2017	Fremantle	6 (0)
2020–2022 (S6)	Richmond	17 (1)
2022 (S7)–2023	Hawthorn	17 (1)
Total		40 (2)
- ^{1} Playing statistics correct to the end of 2023.

Akec Makur Chuot (born 5 September 1992) is a former Australian rules footballer who played for the Fremantle Football Club, Richmond Football Club, and Hawthorn Football Club in the AFL Women's competition.

== Early life and education ==
Akec Makur Chuot was born on 5 September 1992 in South Sudan, the same year her father died. She was raised by her single mother in a family of seven and for twelve years they lived in Kakuma, refugee camp in Kenya.

The family was sponsored by their uncle and moved to Perth, Western Australia, in 2005. She attended Aranmore Catholic College.

== Career ==
In 2009, Makur Chuot tried Australian Rules football for the first time at an East Perth Football Club all-girls carnival. She was drafted by Fremantle with their 18th selection and 139th overall in the 2016 AFL Women's draft. She was also one of the Australian Post Multicultural Ambassadors for the 2017 season. She made her debut in the 32-point loss to the Western Bulldogs at VU Whitten Oval in the opening round of the 2017 season. She played every match in her debut season except for the round six match Carlton against due to being omitted, and finished with six matches. She was delisted at the end of the 2017 season.

In 2018, she moved to Victoria to play with Carlton in the VFL Women's state competition.

Makur Chuot played with Richmond in the VFL Women's in 2019 and signed for the club ahead of the 2020 AFL Women's season. She made her club debut against Carlton at Ikon Park in the opening round of the 2020 season. In June 2021, she was delisted by Richmond, with the intent to re-draft her. In the 2021 AFL Women's draft, Richmond indeed re-listed her with their final pick.

At the end of 2022 season 6 with 4 new clubs joining the AFLW Makur Chuot decided to move to Hawthorn. In Round 1, Makur Chuot played in their inaugural match against Essendon, she had 8 disposals.

== Other activities ==
Makur Chuot appeared in series 3 of Hunted with Joe White. The show was filmed in and around Melbourne.

== Personal life and advocacy ==
Makur Chuot's sister is Ayor Makur Chuot, a member of the Western Australian Legislative Council representing the North Metropolitan region.

Makur Chuot has a half-sister in South Sudan whom she met there in 2013, when she (the sister) was 10 years old. She later learnt that this sister had been forced to marry a much older Australian man, who travelled between the two countries, when she was just 15. By 2024, she was the divorced mother of two young children, stuck in South Sudan and with no opportunities to further her education. This motivated Makur Chuot to join World Vision's "1000 Voices for 1000 Girls" campaign, which uses the personal stories of victims with the aim of helping to reduce violence against women.

== Statistics ==
Updated to the end of 2023.

Legend
G	Goals	K	Kicks	D	Disposals	T	Tackles
B	Behinds	H	Handballs	M	Marks

Season	Team	No.	Games	Totals							Averages (per game)							Votes
Season	Team	No.	Games	G	B	K	H	D	M	T	G	B	K	H	D	M	T	Votes
2017	Fremantle	14	6	0	0	29	8	37	2	13	0.0	0.0	4.8	1.3	6.2	0.3	2.2	1
2020	Richmond	34	6	0	0	44	13	57	8	12	0.0	0.0	7.3	2.2	9.5	1.3	2.0	0
2021	Richmond	34	6	0	0	44	4	48	6	15	0.0	0.0	7.3	0.7	8.0	1.0	2.5	0
2022 (S6)	Richmond	34	5	1	2	22	2	24	6	4	0.2	0.4	4.4	0.4	4.8	1.2	0.8	0
2022 (S7)	Hawthorn	34	10	1	0	83	12	95	25	21	0.1	0.0	8.3	1.2	9.5	2.5	2.1	2
2023	Hawthorn	34	7	0	0	41	6	47	15	12	0.0	0.0	5.9	0.9	6.7	2.1	1.7	0
Career			40	2	2	263	45	308	62	77	0.1	0.1	6.6	1.1	7.7	1.6	1.9	3

== Honours and achievements ==
Individual

- Hawthorn goal of the year: 2022 (S7)
