= Sam Piantadosi =

Australian politician (1946–2010)

The Honourable Sam Piantadosi

Member of the Western Australian Parliament for North Central Metropolitan Province
- In office 1983–1989 Serving with Joe Berinson
- Preceded by: New creation
- Succeeded by: Electorate abolished

Member of the Western Australian Parliament for Electoral region of North Metropolitan
- In office 1989–1996 Serving with Joe Berinson (1989–93); Graham Edwards (1989–96); Bob Pike (1989–94); Reg Davies (1989–96); Max Evans (1989–96); George Cash (1989–96); Ross Lightfoot (1993–96); Iain MacLean (1994–96)
- Preceded by: New creation
- Succeeded by: Various

Personal details
- Born: 15 April 1946 Roccabascerana, Avellino, Italy
- Died: 4 March 2010 (aged 63)
- Citizenship: Australian
- Party: ALP (up to April 1996)

Samuel Mathew Piantadosi (April 1946 – 4 March 2010) was an Australian union official and politician. A senior Western Australian union official and the founding chairman of the Ethnic Communities Council in the 1980s, he was elected as a Labor Party member of the Western Australian Legislative Council at the 1983 state election. His election made him the first post-war Italian migrant to be elected to the Parliament of Western Australia. He was re-elected in 1989, but resigned from the Labor Party in 1996, late in his second term, after reading newspaper reports that party figures were suggesting he would retire. He subsequently resigned from the Legislative Council several months short of the conclusion of his term in an unsuccessful attempt to contest the Legislative Assembly seat of Yokine as an independent at the 1996 state election. He returned to politics in 2007 as a councillor and later Deputy Mayor of the Town of Bassendean, and held the latter role until his death.

== Career before politics ==
Piantadosi was born in Roccabascerana, Avellino, Italy. His family migrated to Western Australia in 1982, and settled in Northbridge. He was educated at St Brigid's Primary School, Christian Brothers' College and Leederville Technical College. He worked for twelve years as an accounts clerk and office manager with the United Fruit and Vegetable Growers Co-operative, and undertook two years' national service in the Army from 1966 to 1968. Having joined the Labor Party in 1968, he entered the trade union movement in 1976, serving as ethnic co-ordinator of the Water Supply Union, the first person to hold such a role in a Western Australian union. He became secretary of the Water Supply Union in 1979, and after that union amalgamated into the new Hospital Services and Miscellaneous Workers Union in 1981, was elected president of the new union, a role he held until his election to parliament. He was the founding convenor of the WA Trades and Labor Council's Migrant Workers Committee, the founding secretary of the North Perth Migrant Resource Centre (1979) and a member of its management committee (1980-1986), a member of the State Advisory Panel for Interpreters and Translators (1979-1981) and the founding chairman of the Ethnic Communities Council of Western Australia (1983).

== Member of the Legislative Council ==
Piantadosi secured Labor preselection for the safe Labor Legislative Council province of North Central Metropolitan at the 1983 state election, and entered state parliament that year. He was re-elected for the new region of North Metropolitan with the introduction of proportional representation in 1989 from the third position on the Labor ticket, and again in 1993 from the second position. He served on the Joint Printing Committee, the Standing Committee on Estimates and Financial Operations (including a stint as deputy chair), the Joint House Committee, and the Standing Orders Committee.

Piantadosi resigned from the Labor Party in 1996 after reading media reports suggesting that party figures had earmarked him to retire, and sat as an independent in the Legislative Council. Not long after, while serving as an independent MP, Piantadosi's home and electoral office were raided by the National Crime Authority, who were investigating an Asian immigration racket. Bank statements, computer records and other documents were seized, but no charges were laid against him. He then resigned from the Legislative Council several months short of the conclusion of his term in order to contest the new Legislative Assembly seat of Yokine as an independent at the 1996 state election. This resulted in a contest of three sitting MPs for the one seat, with Piantadosi challenging Labor MP Nick Catania, the only other Italian-born member of state parliament, and Liberal MP Kim Hames, who had both been redistributed into the same new seat. Piantadosi campaigned on law and order issues and advocated the reintroduction of hanging. He subsequently finished a distant third, with Hames winning the seat.

== Post-political career ==
After leaving politics, Piantadosi founded his own business, Eurasia Trade and Management Services, in 1999. He served as secretary of the Italian Chamber of Commerce and Industry from 1999 to 2002, and as a committee member of the International Business Council of Western Australia.

In 2003, allegations regarding his post-politics work as a migration agent were aired in federal parliament by Liberal MP Don Randall, and the Migration Agents Registration Authority subsequently launched an investigation into complaints regarding his work. He acknowledged that he had "made some mistakes" in processing paperwork with the Department of Immigration, but strongly denied allegations made by Randall that he had "helped himself to clients' funds". His license to act as a migration agent was subsequently suspended for three years in November 2003 after he failed to respond to a request for information from the authority.

He re-entered politics in 2007, winning election as a councillor for the North Ward of the Town of Bassendean, and was elected deputy mayor in 2009, a position which he held until his death.
