= North Metropolitan Region (Western Australia) =

North Metropolitan Region Western Australia—Legislative Council
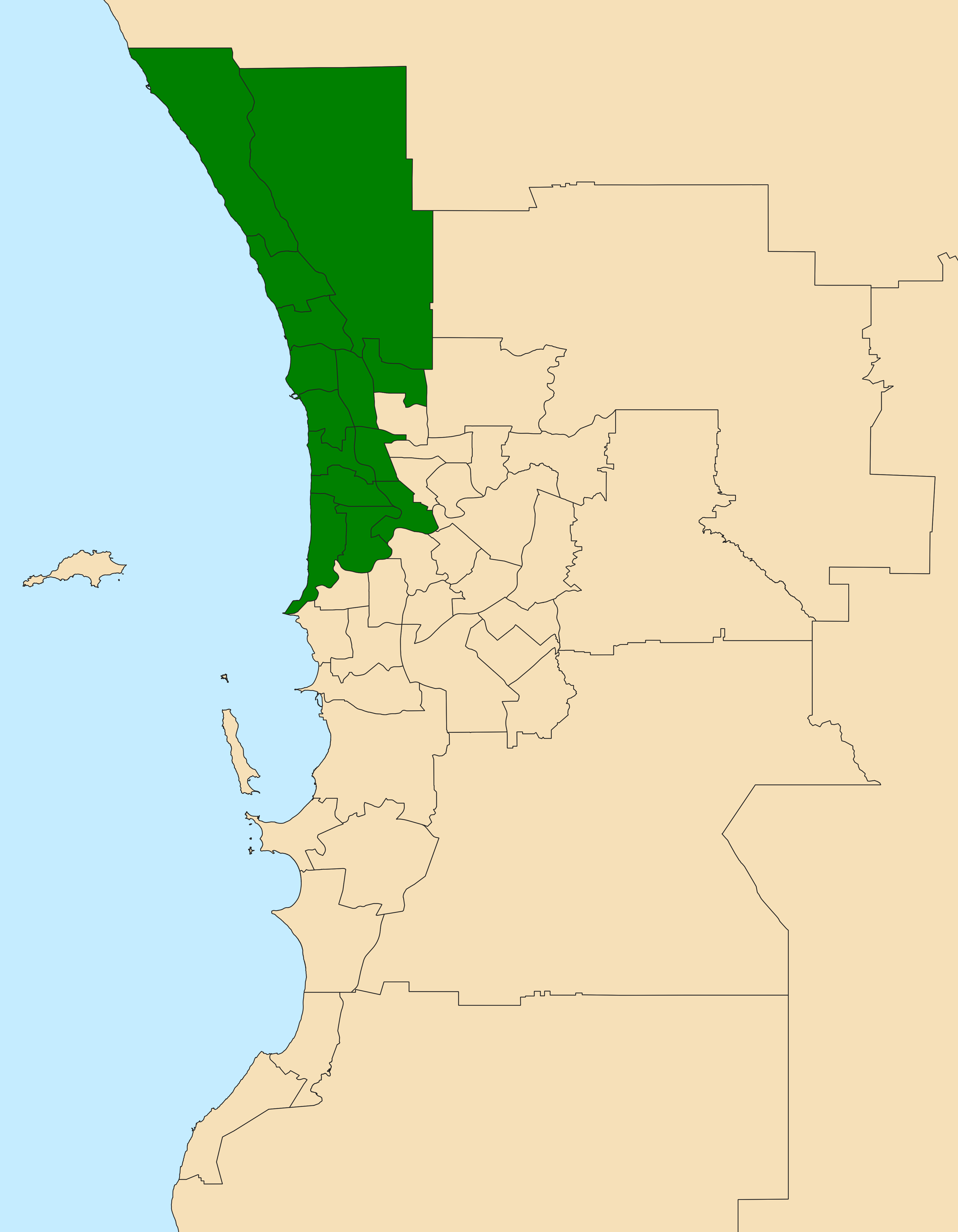
- State: Western Australia
- Dates current: 1989-2025
- Electors: 427,779 (2021)
- Area: 918 km^{2} (354.4 sq mi)
- Demographic: Metropolitan
- Coordinates: 31.57°S 115.66°E

The North Metropolitan Region was a multi-member electoral region of the Western Australian Legislative Council, located in the north-western and western suburbs of Perth. It was created by the Acts Amendment (Electoral Reform) Act 1987, and became effective on 22 May 1989 with seven members who had been elected at the 1989 state election three months earlier. At the 2008 election, it was decreased to six members.

The region, along with all other Western Australian Electoral Regions, was abolished in time with the 2025 state election, following legislation passed in November 2021 to create a single, state-wide constituency of 37 members.

== Geography ==
The Region was made up of several complete Legislative Assembly districts, which changed at each distribution.

Redistribution	Period	Electoral districts	Electors	% of state electors	Area
29 April 1988	22 May 1989 – 22 May 1997	Balcatta, Cottesloe, Dianella, Floreat, Glendalough, Kingsley, Marangaroo, Marmion, Nedlands, Nollamara, Perth, Scarborough, Wanneroo, Whitford (14)	278,499	30.63%	990 km^{2} (380 sq mi)
28 November 1994	22 May 1997 – 22 May 2005	Carine, Churchlands, Cottesloe, Girrawheen, Hillarys, Innaloo, Joondalup, Kingsley, Maylands, Nedlands, Nollamara, Perth, Wanneroo, Yokine (14)	312,209	30.19%	1,005 km^{2} (388 sq mi)
4 August 2003	22 May 2005 – 22 May 2009	Balcatta, Carine, Churchlands, Cottesloe, Girrawheen, Hillarys, Joondalup, Kingsley, Maylands, Mindarie, Nedlands, Perth, Wanneroo, Yokine (14)	374,168	30.78%	996 km^{2} (385 sq mi)
29 October 2007	22 May 2009 – 22 May 2017	Balcatta, Carine, Churchlands, Cottesloe, Girrawheen, Hillarys, Joondalup, Kingsley, Mindarie, Nedlands, Ocean Reef, Perth, Scarborough, Wanneroo (14)	312,578	26.18%	929 km^{2} (359 sq mi)
27 November 2015	22 May 2017 – 22 May 2021	Balcatta, Burns Beach, Butler, Carine, Churchlands, Cottesloe, Girrawheen, Hillarys, Joondalup, Kingsley, Nedlands, Perth, Scarborough, Wanneroo (14)	391,167	24.55%	872 km^{2} (337 sq mi)
27 November 2019	22 May 2021 – 22 May 2025	Balcatta, Burns Beach, Butler, Carine, Churchlands, Cottesloe, Hillarys, Joondalup, Kingsley, Landsdale, Nedlands, Perth, Scarborough, Wanneroo (14)	427,779	24.92%	918 km^{2} (354 sq mi)

== Representation ==
=== Distribution of seats ===
As 7-member seat:
Election	Seats won
1989–1993	
1993–1997	
1997–2001	
2001–2005	
2005–2009	

As 6-member seat:
Election	Seats won
2009–2013	
2013–2017	
2017–2021	
2021–2025	

Legend:
Labor
Liberal
Democrats
Greens WA
Independent

=== Members ===
Since its creation, the electorate had 22 members. Five of these members had previously been members of the Legislative Council—Joe Berinson and Sam Piantadosi (both North Central Metropolitan), Graham Edwards and Bob Pike (both North Metropolitan) and Max Evans (Metropolitan).

Members for North Metropolitan Region
Year	Member	Party	Member	Party	Member	Party	Member	Party	Member	Party	Member	Party	Member	Party
1989	Sam Piantadosi	Labor	Graham Edwards	Labor	Joe Berinson	Labor	Reg Davies	Liberal	Bob Pike	Liberal	Max Evans	Liberal	George Cash	Liberal
1991	Sam Piantadosi	Labor	Graham Edwards	Labor	Joe Berinson	Labor	Reg Davies	Independent	Bob Pike	Liberal	Max Evans	Liberal	George Cash	Liberal
1993	Sam Piantadosi	Labor	Graham Edwards	Labor	Ross Lightfoot	Liberal	Reg Davies	Independent	Bob Pike	Liberal	Max Evans	Liberal	George Cash	Liberal
1994	Sam Piantadosi	Labor	Graham Edwards	Labor	Ross Lightfoot	Liberal	Reg Davies	Independent	Iain MacLean	Liberal	Max Evans	Liberal	George Cash	Liberal
1995	Sam Piantadosi	Independent	Graham Edwards	Labor	Ross Lightfoot	Liberal	Reg Davies	Independent	Iain MacLean	Liberal	Max Evans	Liberal	George Cash	Liberal
1996	Ed Dermer	Labor	Graham Edwards	Labor	Ross Lightfoot	Liberal	Reg Davies	Independent	Iain MacLean	Liberal	Max Evans	Liberal	George Cash	Liberal
1996	Ed Dermer	Labor	Ken Travers	Labor	Helen Hodgson	Democrats	Giz Watson	Greens	Ray Halligan	Liberal	Max Evans	Liberal	George Cash	Liberal
2001	Ed Dermer	Labor	Ken Travers	Labor	Graham Giffard	Labor	Giz Watson	Greens	Ray Halligan	Liberal	Alan Cadby	Liberal	George Cash	Liberal
2004	Ed Dermer	Labor	Ken Travers	Labor	Graham Giffard	Labor	Giz Watson	Greens	Ray Halligan	Liberal	Alan Cadby	Independent	George Cash	Liberal
2005	Ed Dermer	Labor	Ken Travers	Labor	Graham Giffard	Labor	Giz Watson	Greens	Ray Halligan	Liberal	Peter Collier	Liberal	George Cash	Liberal
2008	Ed Dermer	Labor	Ken Travers	Labor	Carolyn Burton	Labor	Giz Watson	Greens	Ray Halligan	Liberal	Peter Collier	Liberal	George Cash	Liberal
2008	Ed Dermer	Labor	Ken Travers	Labor	Michael Mischin	Liberal	Giz Watson	Greens	Liz Behjat	Liberal	Peter Collier	Liberal		
2013	Ljiljanna Ravlich	Labor	Ken Travers	Labor	Michael Mischin	Liberal	Peter Katsambanis	Liberal	Liz Behjat	Liberal	Peter Collier	Liberal		
2015	Martin Pritchard	Labor	Ken Travers	Labor	Michael Mischin	Liberal	Peter Katsambanis	Liberal	Liz Behjat	Liberal	Peter Collier	Liberal		
2016	Martin Pritchard	Labor	Laine McDonald	Labor	Michael Mischin	Liberal	Peter Katsambanis	Liberal	Liz Behjat	Liberal	Peter Collier	Liberal		
2017	Martin Pritchard	Labor	Laine McDonald	Labor	Michael Mischin	Liberal	Elise Irwin	Liberal	Liz Behjat	Liberal	Peter Collier	Liberal		
2017	Martin Pritchard	Labor	Alannah MacTiernan	Labor	Michael Mischin	Liberal	Alison Xamon	Greens	Tjorn Sibma	Liberal	Peter Collier	Liberal		
2021	Martin Pritchard	Labor	Pierre Yang	Labor	Ayor Makur Chuot	Labor	Dan Caddy	Labor	Tjorn Sibma	Liberal	Peter Collier	Liberal		

== Election results ==
2021 Western Australian state election: North Metropolitan
Party	Candidate	Votes	%	±%
Quota		52,319		
Labor	1. Pierre Yang (elected 1); 2. Martin Pritchard (elected 3); 3. Ayor Makur Chuot (elected 4); 4. Dan Caddy (elected 5); 5. Rhys Vallance; 6. Rebeka Marton	215,054	58.72	+21.50
Liberal	1. Peter Collier (elected 2); 2. Tjorn Sibma (elected 6); 3. Simon Ehrenfeld; 4. Tim Walton; 5. Michael Mischin	85,379	23.31	−13.16
Greens	1. Alison Xamon; 2. Daniel Vujcich; 3. Sarah Newbold	27,077	7.39	−2.58
Christians	1. Louis Hildebrandt; 2. Neil Fearis	6,242	1.70	+0.10
Legalise Cannabis	1. Max Armstrong-Moore; 2. Fred Mulholland	5,380	1.47	+1.47
One Nation	1. Tyler Walsh; 2. Sheila Mundy	5,069	1.38	−5.08
No Mandatory Vaccination	1. James Pearce; 2. A. Cirkovic; 3. Sara O'Dal	4,550	1.24	+1.24
Western Australia	1. Elizabeth Re; 2. Steven Pynt	2,669	0.73	+0.13
Animal Justice	1. Michael Anagno; 2. Stephanie Fry	2,593	0.71	−0.48
Shooters, Fishers, Farmers	1. Jan Van Niekerk; 2. Marty Wenham	2,399	0.66	−0.64
Liberal Democrats	1. Kate Fantinel; 2. Richard Tait	1,419	0.39	−0.70
Independent	1. Rafe Roberts; 2. Carel Husselmann	1,335	0.36	+0.36
Liberals for Climate	1. Daithi Gleeson; 2. Paul Holliday	1,268	0.35	−0.09
WAxit	1. John Golawski; 2. Aleksandra Sommer	1,248	0.34	−0.27
Sustainable Australia	1. Colin Scott; 2. Michael Ferrinda	974	0.27	+0.27
Daylight Saving	1. Robert Tucker; 2. Heather Atcheson	888	0.24	−0.56
Great Australian	1. Chris Irwin; 2. Ben Tonkin	721	0.20	+0.20
Health Australia	1. Sanjeev Gupta; 2. George Helou	577	0.16	+0.16
	1. Michael Tucak; 2. John Tucak	482	0.13	−0.15
Independent	1. Andrea Randle; 2. Wvendy Chan	467	0.13	+0.13
Independent	1. Billy Amesz; 2. Steven Gersbach	174	0.05	+0.05
Independent	T. Ravichandar	148	0.04	+0.04
Independent	1. N. Spada; 2. M. Husselmann	116	0.03	+0.03
Total formal votes		366,229	98.49	+1.40
Informal votes		5,633	1.51	−1.40
Turnout		371,862	86.93	−0.28
