= Julie Freeman (politician) =

Australian politician

The Honourable Julie Freeman MLC

Member of the Western Australian Legislative Council
- Incumbent
- Assumed office 22 May 2025

Personal details
- Party: National

Julie Freeman is an Australian politician from the Western Australian National Party.

== Biography ==
Julie Freeman first came to the town of Mullewa as a graduate teacher. Freeman was elected to the Western Australian Legislative Council in the 2025 Western Australian state election. She has served as president of the state party. She was appointed to the executive position in September 2024.
