= Andrew O'Donnell (politician) =

Australian politician

The Honourable Andrew O'Donnell MLC

Member of the Western Australian Legislative Council
- Incumbent
- Assumed office 22 May 2025

Personal details
- Party: Labor

Andrew O'Donnell is an Australian politician from the Western Australian Labor Party.

== Career ==
O'Donnell was elected to the Western Australian Legislative Council in the 2025 Western Australian state election. A shop steward, he is aligned with the Progressive Labor faction of the party.
