= Lauren Cayoun =

Australian politician

The Honourable Lauren Cayoun MLC

Member of the Western Australian Legislative Council
- Incumbent
- Assumed office 22 May 2025

Personal details
- Party: Labor

Lauren Cayoun is an Australian politician from the Western Australian Labor Party.

== Career ==
Cayoun was elected to the Western Australian Legislative Council in the 2025 Western Australian state election. She is the assistant secretary of WA Labor and served as a senior policy adviser to Mark McGowan. She is aligned with the Progressive Labor faction of the party. Cayoun is a former councillor in Belmont. She was previously a candidate in the 2017 Western Australian state election.
