= Laine McDonald =

Australian politician

Member of the Western Australian Legislative Council for North Metropolitan
- In office 27 September 2016 – 21 May 2017
- Preceded by: Ken Travers

Personal details
- Born: 1981 or 1982 (age 43–44)
- Party: Labor
- Profession: Lawyer

Laine Courtney McDonald is an Australian politician. She was a Labor member of the Western Australian Legislative Council for North Metropolitan from 27 September 2016, when she was elected in a countback following the resignation of Ken Travers, to 21 May 2017, when her term concluded following her defeat at the 2017 state election.

She was educated at Kent Street Senior High School. Prior to her entry into parliament, McDonald was a City of Vincent councillor.
