= Klasey Hirst =

Australian politician

The Honourable Klasey Hirst MLC

Member of the Western Australian Legislative Council
- Incumbent
- Assumed office 22 May 2025

Personal details
- Born: Klasey Pendlebury
- Party: Labor

Klasey Hirst is an Australian politician from the Western Australian Labor Party.

== Career ==
Hirst was elected to the Western Australian Legislative Council in the 2025 Western Australian state election. A government adviser, she is aligned with the Progressive Labor faction of the party.

== Personal life ==
Hirst has lived in Regional Australia.
