= Ed Dermer =

Australian politician (born 1957)

The Honourable Ed Dermer MLC

Member of the Western Australian Legislative Council for North Metropolitan Region
- In office 22 May 1997 – 21 May 2013

Personal details
- Born: 30 October 1957 (age 68) Subiaco, Western Australia
- Party: Labor
- Spouse: Sylvie
- Profession: Union organiser

Edmund Rupert Joseph Dermer (born 30 October 1957) is an Australian politician. He was a member of the Western Australian Legislative Council (MLC), representing the North Metropolitan Region from 1996 until 2013. A member of the Labor Party, he was elected at the 1996 state election, replacing retired MP Sam Piantadosi.

Dermer was re-elected at the 2001 and 2005 state elections, and held the position of government whip in the Legislative Council from May 2001 to September 2008, and opposition whip from then until his retirement in May 2013.

Dermer was one of the three North Metropolitan Labor MLCs, including Graham Giffard and Ken Travers, who were critical to the introduction of daylight saving in Western Australia in 2006. Initially intending to vote against the move, they all eventually decided to support it, in line with the wishes of their electorate and party.

== Personal life ==
In 2008, Dermer was caught in a rip current with his sons, Alexander and Cameron, while holidaying at a Surfers Paradise beach. Dermer and Cameron had to be rescued by lifesavers. Not long after that, Dermer was diagnosed with a melanoma on the back of his neck, which was removed and found to be malignant.
