= Pierre Yang =

Chinese Australian politician

The Honourable Pierre Yang MLC
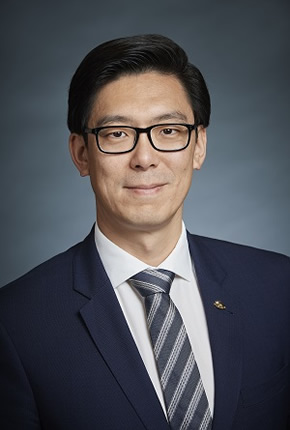

Government Whip in the Legislative Council
- In office 16 May 2018 – 14 February 2023
- Premier: Mark McGowan
- Leader: Sue Ellery
- Preceded by: Martin Pritchard
- Succeeded by: Peter Foster

Member of the Western Australian Legislative Council
- Incumbent
- Assumed office 22 May 2025

Member of the Western Australian Legislative Council for North Metropolitan Region
- In office 22 May 2017 – 21 May 2021
- Preceded by: Alannah MacTiernan
- Succeeded by: Division abolished

Member of the Western Australian Legislative Council for South Metropolitan Region
- In office 22 May 2017 – 21 May 2021
- Preceded by: Sheila Mills
- Succeeded by: Klara Andric

Member of the Gosnells City Council
- In office 19 October 2013 – 22 May 2017

Personal details
- Born: Yang Shuai Yang (杨帅); 27 January 1983 (age 43) Harbin, Heilongjiang, China
- Party: Labor
- Education: University of Western Australia (LLB, BA)
- Occupation: Lawyer; Politician

Military service
- Allegiance: Australia
- Branch/service: Australian Army Reserve
- Years of service: 2006–2016
- Rank: Captain

Pierre Shuai Yang (simplified Chinese: 杨帅; traditional Chinese: 楊帥; pinyin: Yáng Shuài; born on 27 January 1983) is an Australian lawyer and politician who has been a Labor member of the Western Australian Legislative Council since 2017. First elected to represent the South Metropolitan Region, he subsequently stood for the North Metropolitan Region (Western Australia) at the 2021 Western Australian state election. As of the 2025 Western Australian state election all members of the Legislative Council are elected from a whole-of-state electorate.

Born in Harbin, China, Yang moved to Australia when he was 15-years-old (1998), as an overseas student. Around three years later, in September 2001, Yang joined the Labor Party, stating (of the party) in his inaugural speech in the Legislative Council: “The Labor Party believes in a fair and compassionate society where a fair day’s work will return a fair day’s pay and the most vulnerable of our community are supported and protected. The Labor Party believes in giving voice to the voiceless and creating jobs for the jobless, and the Labor Party believes in giving people a fair go.”

Yang was a member of Gosnells City Council before entering state politics. He joined the Australian Army Reserve in 2006, and at the rank of captain, was assigned as a liaison officer and translator on board the Chinese salvage/rescue vessel Dong Hai Jiu 101 during the search for Malaysia Airlines Flight 370.

On 16 May 2018, Yang was elected by the Labor Caucus to the position of Government Whip in the Legislative Council, following the resignation of the position by Martin Pritchard. Peter Foster took over as Government Whip on 14 February 2023.

In December 2022, he became a parliamentary secretary to Simone McGurk, the Minister for Training, Water, and Youth. Since 2023 he has been Parliamentary Secretary to the Minister for Health; Mental Health.

== Foreign agent allegations ==
In 2018, it was reported that Yang had not declared to parliament his membership of the Northeast China Federation and the Association of Great China, which are allegedly affiliated with the Chinese Communist Party through its United Front Work Department. He subsequently stated that he had resigned from the two organisations.
