= Michelle Hofmann =

Australian politician

The Honourable Michelle Hofmann MLC

Member of the Western Australian Legislative Council
- Incumbent
- Assumed office 22 May 2025

Personal details
- Party: Liberal

Michelle Hofmann is an Australian politician from the Western Australian Liberal Party.

== Career ==
Hofmann is a vice president of the WA Liberals. She chaired the party's campaign committee. She is a solicitor by profession.

Hofmann was elected to the Western Australian Legislative Council in the 2025 Western Australian state election. She was an unsuccessful candidate in the 2021 and 2017.
