= Phil Twiss =

Australian politician

The Honourable Phil Twiss MLC

Member of the Western Australian Legislative Council
- Incumbent
- Assumed office 22 May 2025

Personal details
- Party: Liberal
- Other political affiliations: Australian Christians (formerly)

Phillip Twiss is an Australian politician from the Western Australian Liberal Party.

== Career ==
Phil Twiss is a vice-president of the party. Twiss was elected to the Western Australian Legislative Council in the 2025 Western Australian state election. He was an unsuccessful candidate in the 2021 Western Australian state election. He stood for the Australian Christians in the 2016 Australian federal election in Hasluck.
