= Ray Halligan =

Australian politician

The Honourable Ray Halligan OAM

Member of the Western Australian Legislative Council for North Metropolitan Region
- In office 3 June 1997 – 21 May 2009
- Preceded by: Ross Lightfoot

Personal details
- Born: Raymond James Halligan; 23 August 1939 (age 86) Sydney
- Party: Liberal Party
- Spouse: Judy Halligan
- Children: 4

Raymond James Halligan OAM (born 23 August 1939) is a Western Australian politician, who served in the Western Australian legislative Council from 1997 to 2009.

Halligan was born in Sydney in 1939. He attended Woy Woy High School, in the New South Wales Central Coast town of Woy Woy.

In 1968, Halligan was awarded his Accountancy Certificate, and began to practice as an accountant. Working in Papua New Guinea Fiji and Nauru. Ray was employed with the Papua New Guinea Development Bank, as well as private companies in the country. For a time he was Chief Accountant for the Nauru Phosphate Corporation. Halligan is a member of the National Institute of Accountants.

Halligan was elected to the Western Australian Legislative Council in 1997 for the Liberal Party, as the member for the North Metropolitan Region. He was elected at a by-election, after the previous member, Ross Lightfoot, was appointed to the Australian Senate to fill a casual vacancy.

From 9 March to 31 December 2001, Halligan was the Shadow Minister for Local Government. From 1 January 2002 to 20 March 2005, he was the Shadow Minister for three portfolios: Housing, Works and Services and Citizenship and Multicultural Affairs. From 20 March 2005 to 2008he was the Shadow Minister for Citizenship and Multicultural Affairs.

Since 24 May 2005 to 2009, Halligan was the Deputy Chairman of Committees for the Parliament of Western Australia. He was the Deputy Chair of the Joint Standing Committees on the Corruption & Crime Commission, on Delegated Legislation and had been a member of the Standing Committee on Constitutional Affairs. Halligan was the secretary for the parliamentary wing of the Liberal Party in Western Australia.

Halligan is a member of a number of political and community organisations, including Australians for Constitutional Monarchy and Australian National Flag Association. Halligan was made the foundation Vice-Chairman for The Friends of Israel (WA) Inc in 2009.

Halligan was awarded a Liberal Party Meritorious Service Award for his services to the organisational wing of the Liberal Party of Western Australia in 2017. His contribution includes being President of Cowan Division 1994–1996 and again 2010–2011. Also, being Cowan Divisional Treasurer 1988–1994. He served on the State Executive of the Party 1994–1996 & 2010–2011.

In the 2026 Australia Day Honours, Halligan was awarded the Medal of the Order of Australia for "service to the people and Parliament of Western Australia".
