= Phil Scott (Australian politician) =

Australian politician

The Honourable Phil Scott MLC
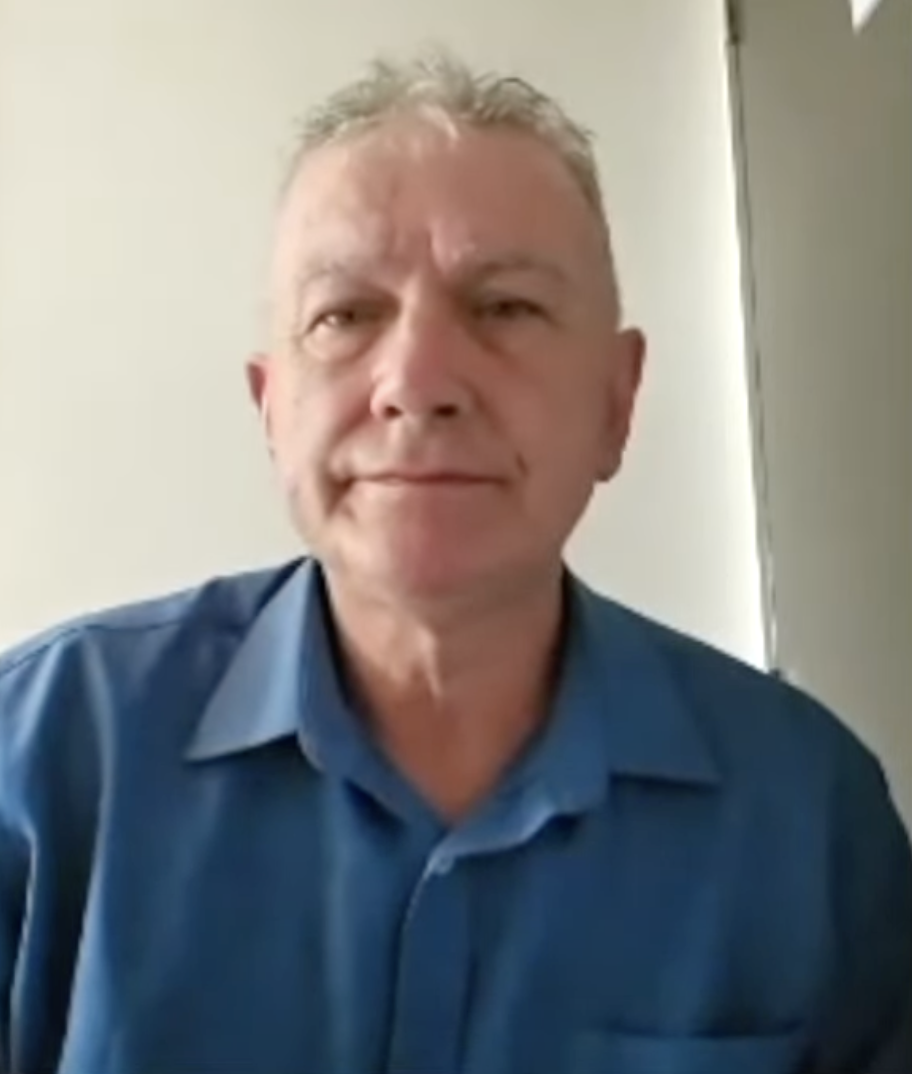

Member of the Western Australian Legislative Council
- Incumbent
- Assumed office 22 May 2025

Personal details
- Born: 1961 (age 64–65) Newcastle-under-Lyme, England
- Party: One Nation (since 2017)

Philip Scott (born 1961) is an Australian politician from Pauline Hanson's One Nation.

== Biography ==
Scott was born in Newcastle-under-Lyme, England, in 1961, and moved to Australia in the 1990s. Scott was elected to the Western Australian Legislative Council in the 2025 Western Australian state election. He was previously a candidate in the 2021 state election.

Scott's wife Ailaoa is of Polynesian background.
