= Amanda Dorn =

Australian politician

The Honourable Amanda Dorn MLC

Member of the Western Australian Legislative Council
- Incumbent
- Assumed office 22 May 2025

Councillor for the City of Swan for Altone Ward
- In office 21 October 2023 – 16 April 2025
- Preceded by: David Lucas
- Succeeded by: Vacant

Personal details
- Party: Animal Justice Party
- Website: https://www.amandadornmp.com

Amanda Dorn is an Australian politician. She is a member of the Western Australian Legislative Council for the Animal Justice Party. She began her term on 22 May 2025, following her election in the 2025 state election, becoming the first Animal Justice Party member elected to the Western Australian Parliament.

== Political career ==
Dorn was elected as a Councillor for the Altone Ward of the City of Swan at the 2023 election. She was responsible for the City of Swan Council passing a motion to expand the City's Kangaroo Management Policy to include all native fauna. Dorn resigned as a Councillor in 2025, following her election to the Western Australian Legislative Council.

Dorn was elected to the Western Australian Legislative Council in the 2025 Western Australian state election. She became her party's first member of the state parliament.

She was previously a candidate in the 2021 Western Australian state election and the 2022 Australian Senate election.

== Personal life ==
Dorn has two rescue dogs, Phoebe and Mr Marble.
