= Maryka Groenewald =

Australian politician

The Honourable Maryka Groenewald MLC
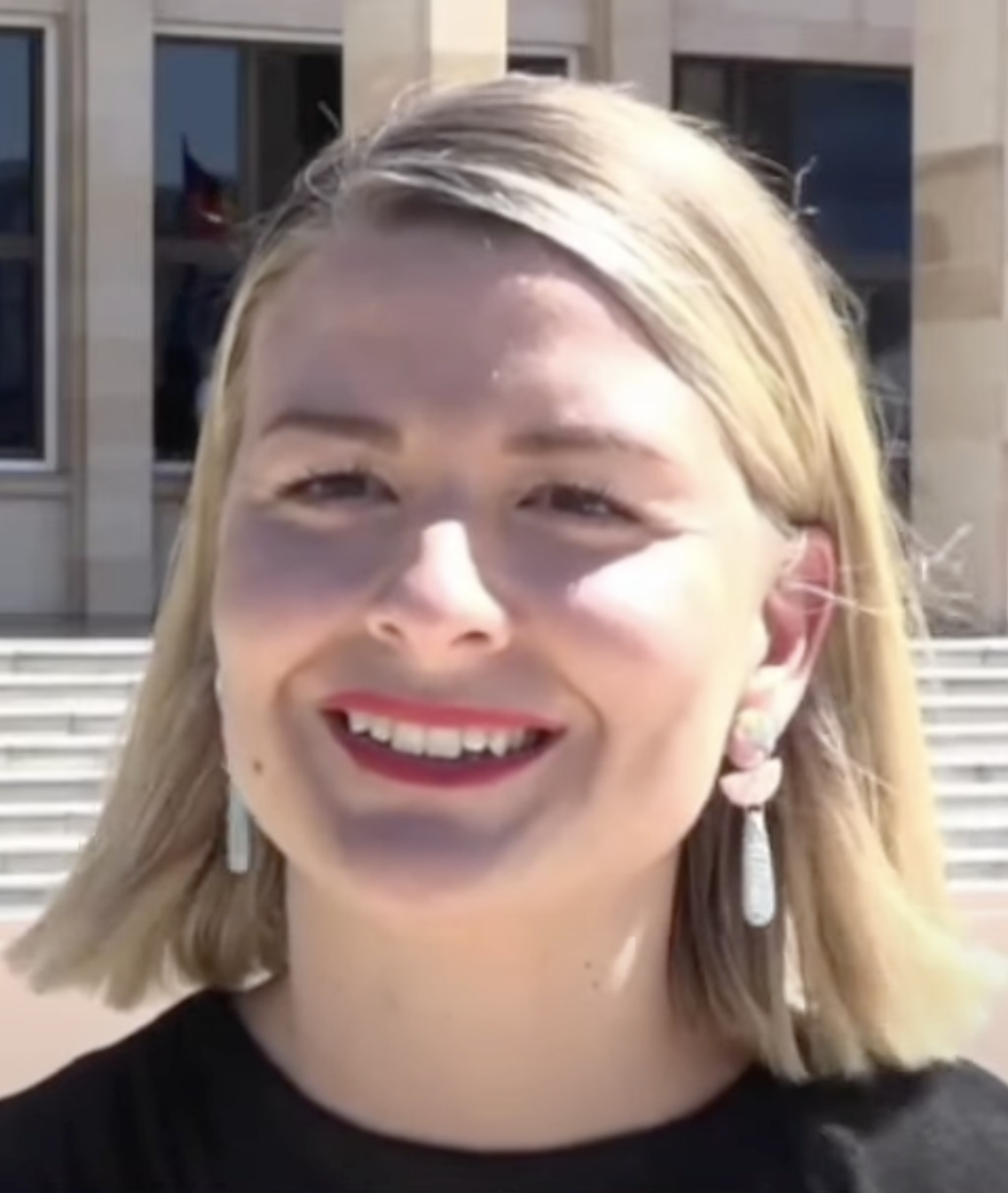

Leader of the Australian Christians
- Incumbent
- Assumed office 2023

Member of the Western Australian Legislative Council
- Incumbent
- Assumed office 22 May 2025

Personal details
- Party: Australian Christians

Maryka Groenewald is an Australian politician. She is the leader of the Australian Christians party and a member of the Western Australian Legislative Council.

== Political career ==
Groenewald was the WA State Director of the Australian Christians Party. She was elected to the Western Australian Legislative Council in the 2025 Western Australian state election. She is the first member of her party elected to a state parliament.

She was previously a candidate in the 2017 Western Australian state election and the 2021 Western Australian state election. Federally she was a candidate in the 2016 Australian federal election and the 2022 Australian federal election.

== Political opinions ==
Groenewald opposes gender-affirming care for minors.

Groenewald has called net zero "bad economics", "a direct threat to our national security" and "nonsensical".

Groenewald defends retaining the Lord’s Prayer being read at the opening of Western Australia's parliament and has called the push for it to be scrapped as "troubling".

Groenewald delivered a Member's Statement in the Legislative Council "in loving memory of Charlie Kirk". Groenewald honoured Kirk, saying he "lived for faith, family, life and liberty" and that "we vale him with gratitude, sorrow, and unwavering respect".
