= Michelle Boylan =

Australian politician

The Honourable Michelle Boylan MLC

Member of the Western Australian Legislative Council
- Incumbent
- Assumed office 22 May 2025

Personal details
- Party: Liberal

Michelle Boylan is an Australian politician from the Western Australian Liberal Party.

== Career ==
Michelle Boylan was a local councillor in the Shire of Harvey. After qualifying as a chef and working in cooking and management roles, she joined the Western Australia Police Force. Boylan was elected to the Western Australian Legislative Council in the 2025 Western Australian state election. She was an unsuccessful candidate in the 2021 Western Australian state election in Murray-Wellington.
