= Rob Horstman =

Australian politician

Member of the Western Australian Legislative Council
- Incumbent
- Assumed office 22 May 2025

Personal details
- Party: National

Robert Horstman is an Australian politician from the Western Australian National Party.

== Biography ==
Horstman was the Deputy President of the Shire of Northampton from 2021 to 2025. He was elected to the Western Australian Legislative Council in the 2025 Western Australian state election. He was previously a candidate in the 2021 state election.

== Personal life ==
Horstman and his wife have three children. In 2021, their family home was damaged by Cyclone Seroja.
