= Helen Hodgson =

Australian politician

Helen Margaret Hodgson, née Applin (born 19 August 1961) is a former Western Australian state politician of the Australian Democrats party. Born in Bristol, England, she migrated to Australia in 1963. She was a lecturer in taxation at Curtin University in Perth before being elected in 1996 to the Western Australian Legislative Council, representing North Metropolitan Region from 1997 until 2001 when she was defeated and retired from politics, returning to teaching.
