= Simon Ehrenfeld =

Australian politician

The Honourable Simon Ehrenfeld MLC

Member of the Western Australian Legislative Council
- Incumbent
- Assumed office 22 May 2025

Personal details
- Party: Liberal

Simon Ehrenfeld is an Australian politician from the Western Australian Liberal Party.

== Career ==
Ehrenfeld is a businessman.

He is the Division of Moore president of the local Liberal party branch. Ehrenfeld was elected to the Western Australian Legislative Council in the 2025 Western Australian state election. In 2016, he was a candidate to succeed Rob Johnson. Peter Katsambanis stood as the candidate for Hillarys at the 2017 Western Australian state election. He was an unsuccessful candidate in the 2021 Western Australian state election.

== Personal life ==
Ehrenfeld is Jewish.
