= Michael Mischin =

Australian politician

The Honourable Michael Mischin MLC

Member of the Legislative Council of Western Australia
- In office 22 May 2009 – 21 May 2021
- Constituency: North Metropolitan Region

Personal details
- Born: 29 December 1958 (age 67) Subiaco, Western Australia
- Party: Liberal
- Education: University of Western Australia

Michael Mischin (born 29 December 1958) is an Australian barrister and politician who was a member of the Legislative Council of Western Australia from 2009 to 2021, representing North Metropolitan Region. He was attorney-general in the government of Colin Barnett from 2012 to 2017.

== Early life ==
Mischin was born in Perth to Maria (née Lewkowski) and George Mischin. His parents had arrived in Australia as displaced persons after World War II, his father being of Russian origin and his mother's family originating from "a small village on the Polish–Belorussian border". Mischin attended Scarborough Senior High School before going on to study law at the University of Western Australia. He was called to the bar in 1982, and afterward worked in a private law firm until 1985, when he joined the state government's Crown Law Department. Mischin later worked for the Director of Public Prosecutions, reaching the rank of senior state prosecutor.

== Politics ==
At the 2007 federal election, Mischin ran for the Senate in fourth position on the Liberal Party's ticket in Western Australia, but was not elected. The following year, at the 2008 state election, he was elected to a Legislative Council term starting in May 2009, running in second position on the Liberal ticket in North Metropolitan Region. Mischin was made deputy chairman of committees in the Legislative Council a few months after his election, and also became a parliamentary secretary. In June 2012, following the resignation of Christian Porter, he was appointed attorney-general. After the 2013 state election, Mischin was also made Minister for Commerce, replacing Simon O'Brien. With the defeat of the Liberal-led Government on 11 March 2017, Michael became the Deputy Leader of the Opposition in the Legislative Council and was appointed Shadow Attorney General and Shadow Minister for Commerce. He was defeated at the 2021 general election.

== See also ==
- Barnett Ministry

Political offices
Preceded by Christian Porter	Attorney-General of Western Australia; 2012–2017	Succeeded by John Quigley
Preceded by Simon O'Brien	Minister for Commerce; 2013–2017	Succeeded by Bill Johnston
