= Reg Davies (politician) =

Australian politician

Reginald Elliott Davies (born 21 December 1943 - died 2 April 2025) is a former Australian politician.

He was born in Bellingen, New South Wales to farrier Edward Davies and Edna Milly Clayworth. He was educated in the New South Wales towns of Belmont and Wauchope and worked as a timber worker from 1959 to 1963. In 1963 he enlisted in the Army, seeing active service with the Australian Special Air Service Regiment (2 Sqn) in Borneo, Vietnam and Malaysia before his retirement in 1985. On 22 April 1967 he married Kaye Dorothy Davies (née Armstrong) (10 December 1942 – 24 April 1995). They had three sons: Jamie Willis (1968), Peter Elliott 1971 (deceased 1971), and Adam Justin (1972).

Having moved to Western Australia in 1965, Davies served as a councillor on Stirling City Council from 1986 to 1989, and was active in the Liberal Party as president of the Balga branch from 1986 to 1988. He was vice-president of the Stirling Division and was the regional co-ordinator for North Metropolitan Province from 1987 to 1989. He also directed the campaigns for the federal seats of Cowan in 1987 and Moore in 1990.

At the 1989 state election he was elected to the Western Australian Legislative Council for North Metropolitan. He resigned from the Liberal Party in 1991, and was re-elected as an independent at the 1993 election. Davies remains the only person to win election to the council as an independent since it underwent a major reorganisation in 1989. He was defeated at the 1996 election and his term ended in 1997.
