= Bob Pike (politician) =

Australian politician

Robert Gerald Pike (17 December 1933 – 26 April 1994) was an Australian politician.

He was born at Collie to master butcher John Francis Pike and Ruby Doris Kathleen Wood. After attending local schools, he served in the Royal Australian Air Force in 1954 and from 1956 to 1960, subsequently working in Collie as a master butcher. From 1957 to 1970 he served on Collie Shire Council, as president from 1962. A Liberal, he was elected to the Western Australian Legislative Council in 1977 representing North Metropolitan; he was Minister for Cultural Affairs and Recreation from 1982 to 1983. He lost his seat in 1983, but returned to the Council in 1989 for North Metropolitan region. He was Shadow Minister for Federal Affairs from 1992 to 1993 and Parliamentary Secretary for Electoral and Federal Affairs from 1993 to 1994, when he died at Nedlands.
