= Dan Caddy =

Australian politician (born 1973)

The Honourable Dan Caddy MLC

Member of the Western Australian Legislative Council
- Incumbent
- Assumed office 22 May 2021

Personal details
- Born: Cottesloe, Western Australia
- Party: Labor
- Education: Murdoch University

Dan Caddy (born 1973) is an Australian politician who has served as a member of the Western Australian Legislative Council since 2021.

Caddy attended Christ Church Grammar School and Murdoch University. Prior to entering parliament, he was a small business owner and worked as a ministerial adviser. He contested the 2013 federal election for the seat of Stirling.

At the 2021 Western Australian state election, Caddy was elected to the Western Australian Legislative Council as a Labor member for North Metropolitan. He was re-elected to the Legislative Council at the 2025 state election.

Following his re-election in 2025, Caddy was appointed as the Parliamentary Secretary to the Attorney General; Minister for Commerce; Tertiary and International Education; Multicultural Affairs.
