= Tjorn Sibma =

Australian politician

The Honourable Tjorn Sibma MLC

Member of the Western Australian Legislative Council for North Metropolitan Region
- Incumbent
- Assumed office 22 May 2017

Personal details
- Born: Tjorn Dirk Sibma; 12 April 1977 (age 49) Perth, Western Australia
- Party: Liberal Party

Tjorn Dirk Sibma (born 12 April 1977) is an Australian politician. He was elected to the Western Australian Legislative Council at the 2017 state election, as a Liberal member in North Metropolitan Region. His term began on 22 May 2017.

Sibma previously worked as a staffer for the Barnett Government.
