= Ayor Makur Chuot =

Western Australian politician

The Honourable Ayor Makur Chuot MLC
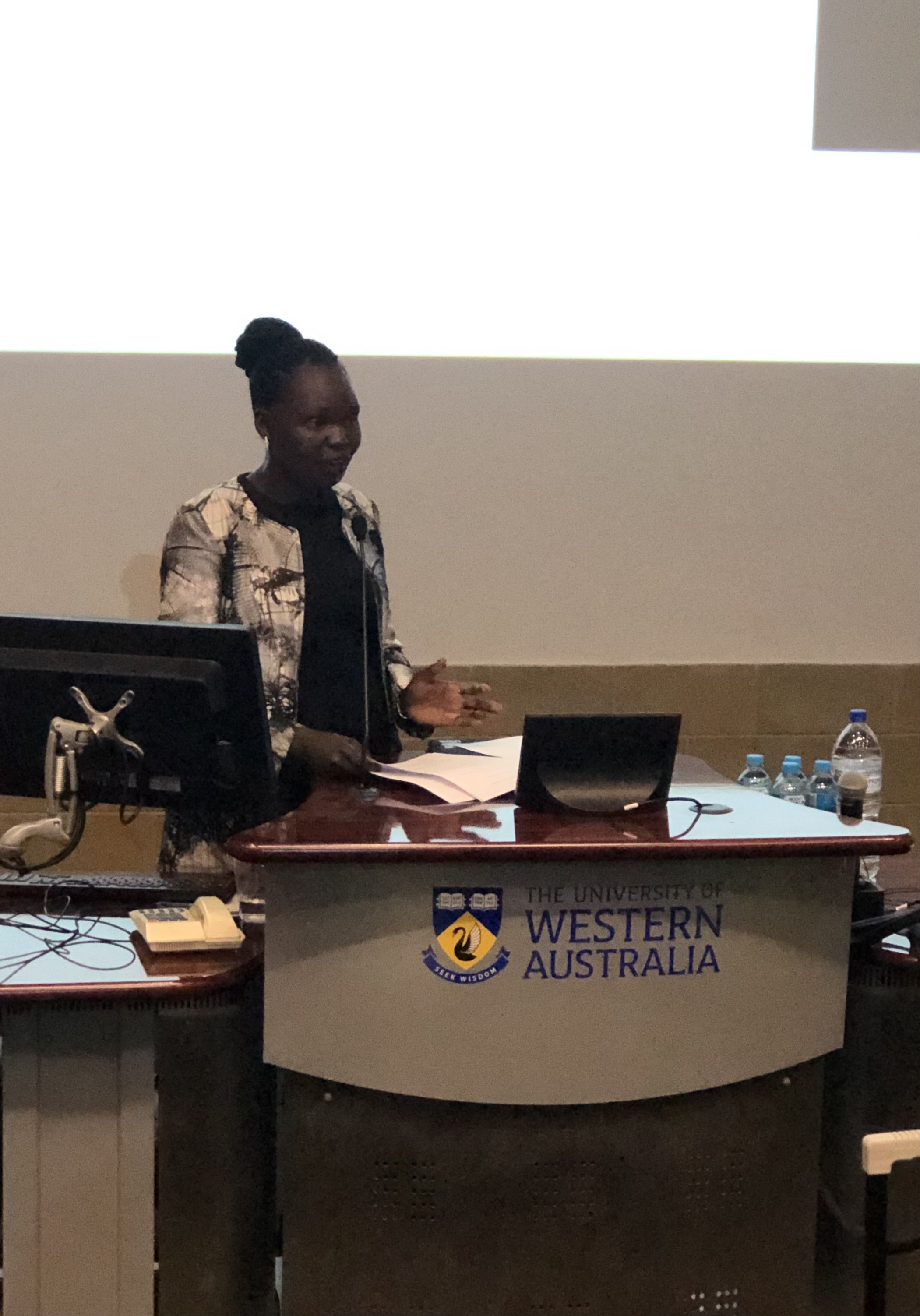

Member of the Western Australian Legislative Council for North Metropolitan
- Incumbent
- Assumed office 22 May 2021

Personal details
- Born: 4 August 1989 (age 36) Gambela, Ethiopia
- Party: Labor
- Relatives: Akec Makur Chuot (sister)
- Occupation: Accountant • model

Ayor Makur Chuot (born 4 August 1989) was elected to the Western Australian Legislative Council as a Labor Party member for North Metropolitan region at the 2021 state election, and as the first WA state MP of African and South Sudanese ancestry.

Prior to being elected Chuot was an accountant and international model.

Chuot and her family emigrated to Australia refugees in 2005, after her father was killed in the Second Sudanese Civil War. Prior to migrating, the family had spent ten years in the Kakuma refugee camp in Kenya. Her sister is Akec Makur Chuot, an AFLW player for Richmond.
