= Alan Cadby =

Australian politician

Alan Alfred Cadby (born 4 October 1947) was an Australian politician. He was a member of the Western Australian Legislative Council from 2001 to 2005, representing the Liberal Party from 2001 to 2004, and serving as an independent from 2004 to 2005, for the seven-member North Metropolitan Region.

He is most well-known for providing the crucial last vote to pass the one vote, one value legislation, abolishing the state's rural gerrymander, which had been stalled for some years in a deadlocked Legislative Council. As a member of the Liberal Party, Cadby had been bound to oppose the legislation but when, in early 2004, he lost preselection to recontest his seat, after a challenge from Peter Collier, he quit the party and became an independent. As an independent, he promptly provided the final vote necessary to ensure the passage of the legislation.

However, the Liberal Party was aware of Cadby's support of the principle of one vote one value (Electoral Amendment Bill 2001) in November 2001, when he approached the Liberal strategist, Jeremy Buxton, stating that he would have great difficulty in speaking against the bill when it arrived in the Legislative Council, because he believed in the principle of one vote, one value. A compromise was reached on his stance, and Buxton provided Cadby with a set of general notes that he could use in his speech, giving a generic view about the value of a vote. The speech was delivered on 28 November 2001.

Along with the Liberal member for Ningaloo, Rod Sweetman, Cadby offered to serve out his parliamentary term as a Family First Party member. Sweetman's offer was rejected by that party because, in 1998, he had supported a bill for decriminalisation of abortion. Cadby withdrew his candidature for the party as a result of its treatment of Sweetman.

Independents had traditionally struggled in elections for the Legislative Council and, facing near-certain defeat, Cadby decided to retire at the 2005 state election.
