= Max Evans (politician) =

Australian politician (1930–2019)

The Honourable Max Evans

Member of the Legislative Council of Western Australia
- In office 22 May 1986 – 21 May 1989
- Preceded by: Ian Medcalf
- Succeeded by: Abolished
- Constituency: Metropolitan Province
- In office 22 May 1989 – 1 May 2001
- Constituency: North Metropolitan Region

Personal details
- Born: 29 November 1930 Perth, Western Australia, Australia
- Died: 30 April 2019 (aged 88) Perth, Western Australia, Australia
- Party: Liberal Party

George Maxwell Evans MBE (29 November 1930 – 30 April 2019) was an Australian politician who represented the Liberal Party in the Legislative Council of Western Australia from 1986 to 2001. He served as a government minister from 1993 to 1999 under Richard Court. He was a chartered accountant and prominent in Western Australia's business community before entering politics. Evans was also involved with the Scouting Movement in Western Australia during his lifetime.

== Early life ==
Evans was born in Perth, the second son of Victor Gordon Evans and the former Joyce Marguerite Stephens. He was raised in the western suburbs, attending Thomas Street State School, Subiaco (now known as Rosalie Primary School) from 1936 to 1942. He then went on to attend Scotch College from 1943 to 1948, and was prefect in his final year. He was on the school hockey, athletic, and tennis teams. Evans was a member of the state athletic team from 1951 to 1955, and was the state 220-yards champion twice, also winning a relay gold medal at the Australian Championships. He additionally played A-grade hockey. Evans also had a long involvement in the Scouting Movement. He became a King's Scout in 1945, and worked his way up through the movement to become a scoutmaster and eventually Chief Commissioner of Scouts Western Australia.

Evans married Barbara Gweneth Baty on 20 December 1958 at Christ Church, Claremont. The couple had four children together, three sons and a daughter. Their eldest son, Peter Evans was an Olympic gold medallist in swimming. Their other children had outstanding business careers.

== Professional life ==
In 1949, Evans joined an accounting firm, Hendry, Rae and Court, one of the partners of which was future Premier Sir Charles Court. He qualified as a chartered accountant in 1954, became a partner in the firm in 1958, and eventually became a senior partner until his retirement in 1991. He became a fellow of the Fellow of the Institute of Chartered Accountants of Australia in 1961, and was appointed Member of the Order of the British Empire (MBE) in 1972 for services to the community. Evans was president of the Perth Chamber of Commerce from 1983 to 1984 and president of the Western Australian Chamber of Commerce and Industry from 1984 to 1985. He was also honorary treasurer of the Australian Chamber of Commerce and Industry from 1983 to 1985.

== Politics ==
Evans was elected to the Legislative Council of Western Australia at the 1986 state election, replacing the retiring Liberal stalwart Ian Medcalf in Metropolitan Province. Three years later, following the reform of the council, he was elected to the new six-member North Metropolitan Region. Because of his unique expertise in business and accounting background, Evans immediately became a Shadow Minister after entering parliament. However, because the Liberals did not win power until 1993, he did not become an actual minister until that point. Evans was Minister for Finance (1993–1999), Minister for Racing and Gaming (1993–999), and Minister Assisting the Treasurer (1993–1997). Evans has also been credited with helping to establish Lotterywest and ensure it stays in public hands. He was one of Richard Court's most capable and durable cabinet members throughout his eight-year government, contributing to the steadiness of Western Australia's finances that ensured the highest credit rating possible and placed the state in the best position to benefit from the mining boom of the mid-to-late 2000s.

== Death ==
Evans died on 30 April 2019. A public service was held at St George's Cathedral, Perth.
