= Giz Watson =

Australian politician

Giz Watson OAM
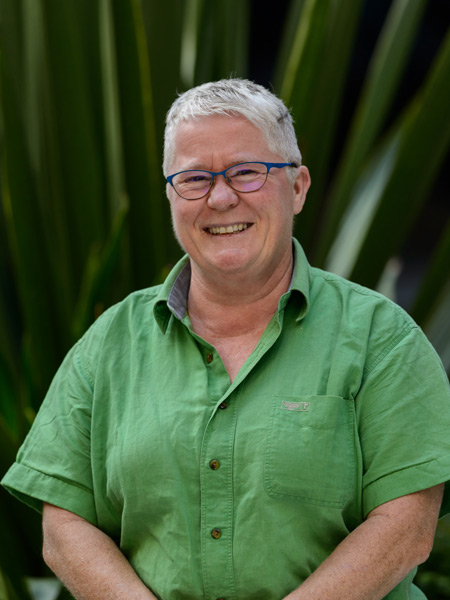

Member of the Western Australian Legislative Council for North Metropolitan Region
- In office 22 May 1997 – 21 May 2013

Personal details
- Born: Elizabeth Mary Watson; 18 January 1957 (age 69) Eastleigh, Hampshire, England
- Party: Greens WA
- Domestic partner: June Lowe
- Education: Murdoch University

Elizabeth Mary "Giz" Watson (born 18 January 1957) is an English-born Australian politician and a former leader of The Greens, Western Australia. She served as a member of the Western Australian Legislative Council for the North Metropolitan Region from 22 May 1997 until her retirement on 21 May 2013.

== Biography ==
Watson was born in 1957 in Eastleigh, a town in Hampshire, England, and emigrated to Western Australia in September 1967, travelling extensively through the state. She studied environmental science at Murdoch University and, after leaving university to do voluntary work for a couple of years, graduated with a Bachelor of Science degree in 1980. Watson was involved in protests in Western Australia against the Vietnam War in the early 1970s. She also became involved in 1979 in the first forest blockades at Wagerup against clear felling of jarrah forests for bauxite mining.

She returned to the United Kingdom in the 1980s, where she was involved with training women to participate in the peace camp outside the Royal Air Force base RAF Greenham Common, which protested against the deployment of nuclear cruise missiles at the base. In 1985 she participated in the first encirclement by women protestors of Greenham Common. In 1984 Watson attained a trade certificate in carpentry from the City and Guilds of London Institute in London. It was soon after this that she joined an anarchist building collective in London, with everyone from architects to labourers getting the same pay, making decisions equally and subsidising worthy projects.

In 1985 she returned to Australia and ran a building and construction business in Western Australia. In 1992, Watson became one of only three women to be registered as builders in Western Australia. During this time Watson also worked as the coordinator for the Marine & Coastal Community Network in Western Australia.

== Political career ==
Watson joined the Greens WA party in 1990, and in the federal election that year, stood for the House of Representatives seat of Forrest. Shortly afterwards, she became the co-convener of the Greens WA party. Watson was narrowly elected to the state's Legislative Council at the 1996 election, as a member for the North Metropolitan Region. She was re-elected in 2001, 2005 and 2008. At the 2013 Western Australian state election, Watson decided to move Legislative Council regions, switching from running for re-election in her seat in the Northern Metropolitan region, to candidacy in the South West region. However, Watson was unsuccessful as she was not elected in this region.

During her political career she had portfolio responsibilities for an enormous range of matters, including not only biodiversity, environment and climate change but also health, justice and prisons, human rights, mandatory sentencing, and the over-representation of Aboriginal and Torres Strait Islander peoples in the criminal justice system. In addition, throughout her Parliamentary career Watson maintained a steadfast commitment to the principles of open and accountable government. Her parliamentary career has been characterised by – in her words – "working in the spirit of consensus but also standing firm on matters of principle". Watson was the first openly lesbian parliamentarian in Australia and she played a significant role in lesbian and gay law reform in Western Australia. Her parliamentary career also included an active role in the achievement of abortion law reform in Western Australia. Watson's activism in the causes of gay and lesbian rights, social justice, indigenous rights, and peace and environmentalism, together with her parliamentary service made a major contribution to civil and human rights in Western Australia. Her service and contributions were recognised in 2011 when she was inducted into the Western Australian Women's Hall of Fame. Watson campaigned in parliament on a number of issues, including the banning of uranium mining and radioactive waste disposal in Western Australia. She also campaigned against female genital mutilation since at least 1998, and in 2004 successfully lobbied Jim McGinty, the WA Attorney-General, to introduce laws making the practice a crime. She introduced legislation to manage cats and another to protect WA's biodiversity. Watson and Labor MP Sally Talbot have spoken out against uranium mining, nuclear power, and radioactive waste disposal in WA.

Watson was a WA Senate candidate for the Greens in the 2019 federal election but was unsuccessful. She was the Green candidate for the Division of O'Connor in the 2025 Australian federal election.

She was awarded the Medal of the Order of Australia in the 2026 King's Birthday Honours for "service to the environment, and to the Parliament of Western Australia".

== Personal life ==
Watson, a graduate of Murdoch University from the 1980s, was awarded an honorary doctorate from the university in 2015.

Since 1990, Watson has lived with her partner, June Lowe, a social researcher.
