= Martin Pritchard =

Australian politician

The Honourable Martin Pritchard MLC

Member of the Western Australian Legislative Council for North Metropolitan
- Incumbent
- Assumed office 21 April 2015
- Preceded by: Ljiljanna Ravlich

Personal details
- Born: 16 July 1959 (age 66) Lymington, England, United Kingdom
- Party: Labor
- Occupation: Union official

Martin Brian Pritchard (born 16 July 1959) is an Australian politician. He was born in Lymington in England, and arrived in Western Australia in 1967. He has been a Labor member of the Western Australian Legislative Council for North Metropolitan since 21 April 2015, when he was elected in a countback following Ljiljanna Ravlich's resignation.
