= Electoral results for the East Metropolitan Region =

This is a list of electoral results for the East Metropolitan Region in Western Australian state elections from the region's creation in 1989 until the present.

Legislation to abolish the region, along with all other Western Australian electoral regions, was passed in November 2021, with the 2025 state election to use a single state-wide electorate of 37 members.

== Election results ==
=== 2021 ===
2021 Western Australian state election: East Metropolitan
Party	Candidate	Votes	%	±%
Quota		50,311		
Labor	1. Alanna Clohesy (elected 1); 2. Samantha Rowe (elected 2); 3. Matthew Swinbourn (elected 3); 4. Lorna Harper (elected 4); 5. Robert Green; 6. John Keogh	232,094	65.90	+19.40
Liberal	1. Donna Faragher (elected 5); 2. Phil Twiss; 3. Greg Halls; 4. Daniel Newman; 5. Jeremy Quinn	48,343	13.73	−11.23
Greens	1. Tim Clifford; 2. Caroline Perks; 3. Callan Gray	21,285	6.04	−2.86
Legalise Cannabis	1. Brian Walker (elected 6); 2. Karl Reinmuth	9,258	2.63	+2.63
Christians	1. Maryka Groenewald; 2. Jamie van Burgel	8,860	2.52	+0.04
One Nation	1. Dale Grillo; 2. Tim Orr	5,122	1.45	−6.57
Shooters, Fishers, Farmers	1. Trevor Ruwoldt; 2. Coby Thomas	4,436	1.26	−0.78
No Mandatory Vaccination	1. Patricia Ayre; 2. Daniel Hall	3,987	1.13	+1.13
Western Australia	1. Charles Smith; 2. James Anthony	2,904	0.82	+0.41
Independent	Peter Lyndon-James	2,738	0.78	+0.78
Animal Justice	1. Amanda Dorn; 2. Nicole Arielli	2,571	0.73	−0.73
Liberal Democrats	1. Craig Buchanan; 2. Neil Hamilton	1,879	0.53	−0.50
Liberals for Climate	1. Marilyn Lottering; 2. R. Smith	1,818	0.52	+0.06
Independent	1. David Larsen; 2. Brian Brightman	1,360	0.39	+0.39
WAxit	1. Satinder Samra; 2. Robin Singh; 3. Monty Singh	1,223	0.35	−0.41
Health Australia	1. Lidia Skorokhod; 2. Lisa Rowe	1,106	0.31	+0.31
Sustainable Australia	1. Nicole Watts; 2. Keith Lethbridge	1,047	0.30	+0.30
Daylight Saving	1. James McManus; 2. Mark Bradley	828	0.24	−0.55
Great Australian	1. Benny Tilbury; 2. Bradley Ward	820	0.23	+0.23
Independent	Hayley Doan	494	0.14	+0.14
Total formal votes		352,173	97.75	+0.66
Informal votes		8,098	2.25	−0.66
Turnout		360,271	85.02	−2.19

=== 2017 ===
2017 Western Australian state election: East Metropolitan
Party	Candidate	Votes	%	±%
Quota		47,831		
Labor	1. Alanna Clohesy (elected 1); 2. Samantha Rowe (elected 3); 3. Matthew Swinbourn (elected 4); 4. Thomas French; 5. Reece Wheadon; 6. Lauren Cayoun	155,707	46.51	+8.28
Liberal	1. Donna Faragher (elected 2); 2. Alyssa Hayden; 3. Helen Morton; 4. Christopher Tan; 5. Raymond Gianoli; 6. Joanna Collins	83,547	24.95	−21.85
Greens	1. Tim Clifford (elected 5); 2. Sarah Nielsen-Harvey; 3. Robyn Walsh	29,810	8.90	+0.74
One Nation	1. Charles Smith (elected 6); 2. Chris Fernandez; 3. Lloyd McIntosh	26,874	8.03	+8.03
Christians	1. Jamie van Burgel; 2. Maryka Groenewald	8,292	2.48	−0.22
Shooters, Fishers, Farmers	1. Paul Pitaro; 2. Mitchell Wellstead; 3. Steve Denham	6,836	2.04	+0.41
Animal Justice	1. Talia Raphaely; 2. Nicole Arielli	4,874	1.46	+1.46
Liberal Democrats	1. Neil Hamilton; 2. Todd Phillips	3,464	1.03	+1.03
Family First	1. Simon Geddes; 2. Steve Fuhrmann	3,361	1.00	+1.00
Daylight Saving	1. Michael Zakrzewski; 2. Riley Burkett	2,642	0.79	+0.79
Micro Business	1. Kelvin White; 2. W. Ginbey	2,531	0.76	+0.76
Flux the System!	1. Rob Redfearn; 2. Jim Taylor	1,522	0.45	+0.45
Matheson for WA	1. Russell Goodrick; 2. Stephen Lau	1,400	0.42	+0.42
Fluoride Free WA	1. John Watt; 2. Trevor McGowan	1,262	0.38	+0.38
Independent Flux	1. M. Lotterin; 2. Stef Pienaar	802	0.24	+0.24
Independent	1. Shawn Dhu; 2. Belinda Lange	677	0.20	+0.20
Independent	1. Jayme Hewitt; 2. Natasha Forde	442	0.13	+0.13
Independent	Roger Cornish	392	0.12	+0.12
Independent Flux	1. Charday Williams; 2. Ben Devlin	381	0.11	+0.11
Total formal votes		334,816	97.09	+0.48
Informal votes		10,036	2.91	−0.48
Turnout		344,852	87.20	−2.44

=== 2013 ===
2013 Western Australian state election: East Metropolitan
Party	Candidate	Votes	%	±%
Quota		43,347		
Liberal	1. Helen Morton (elected 1); 2. Donna Faragher (elected 3); 3. Alyssa Hayden (elected 5); 4. Caroline Preuss; 5. Darryl Trease; 6. Jessica Thorpe-Gordon	142,004	46.80	+9.06
Labor	1. Alanna Clohesy (elected 2); 2. Samantha Rowe (elected 4); 3. Amber-Jade Sanderson (elected 6); 4. Bill Leadbetter; 5. Michelle O'Driscoll; 6. Andy Smith	115,979	38.22	−2.88
Greens	1. Alison Xamon; 2. Glenice Smith; 3. David Bromfield	24,756	8.16	−3.49
Christians	1. Dwight Randall; 2. David Kingston	8,189	2.70	−0.23
Shooters and Fishers	1. Michael Georgiou; 2. Grant Cooper	4,963	1.64	+1.64
Family First	1. Paul Barrett; 2. Nathan Clifford	3,655	1.20	−2.00
Independent	Chung Tu	1,553	0.51	+0.51
Independent	Tom Hoyer	1,380	0.45	−0.17
	Joe Nardizzi	949	0.31	+0.31
Total formal votes		303,428	96.61	−0.13
Informal votes		10,655	3.39	+0.13
Turnout		314,083	89.65	+2.36

=== 2008 ===
2008 Western Australian state election: East Metropolitan
Party	Candidate	Votes	%	±%
Quota		39,514		
Labor	1. Jock Ferguson (elected 1); 2. Ljiljanna Ravlich (elected 3); 3. Linda Savage; 4. Gary Carson; 5. Carolyn Burton; 6. Craig Comrie	113,686	41.10	−9.3
Liberal	1. Helen Morton (elected 2); 2. Donna Faragher (elected 4); 3. Alyssa Hayden (elected 5); 4. Steve Blizard; 5. Darryl Trease; 6. Guy Simpson	104,385	37.74	+5.5
Greens	1. Alison Xamon (elected 6); 2. Steve Wolff; 3. Damian Douglas-Meyer	32,228	11.65	+4.6
Family First	1. Stephen Bolt; 2. Symia Hopkinson	8,839	3.20	+1.0
Christian Democrats	1. Dwight Randall; 2. Gerard Goiran	8,094	2.93	0.0
National	1. Sean Wood; 2. Kevin Mangini	2,690	0.97	+1.0
One Nation	James Hopkinson	2,051	0.74	−1.1
Independent	Tom Hoyer	1,724	0.62	+0.6
Daylight Savings	Conor Day	1,665	0.60	+0.60
Independent	Richard Nash	514	0.19	+0.2
Citizens Electoral Council	1. Neil Vincent; 2. Theresa Passmore	417	0.15	0.0
Independent	John Tucak	298	0.11	−0.6
Total formal votes		276,591	96.74	+0.2
Informal votes		9,319	3.26	−0.2
Turnout		285,910	87.29	−4.0

=== 2005 ===
2005 Western Australian state election: East Metropolitan
Party	Candidate	Votes	%	±%
Quota		40,150		
Labor	1. Ljiljanna Ravlich (elected 1); 2. Nick Griffiths (elected 3); 3. Louise Pratt (elected 4); 4. Batong Pham; 5. Todd Gogol; 6. Rita Saffioti	121,910	50.6	+6.4
Liberal	1. Helen Morton (elected 2); 2. Donna Taylor (elected 5); 3. Bill Munro	77,304	32.1	+1.8
Greens	1. Lee Bell; 2. Alison Xamon	15,593	6.5	+0.1
Christian Democrats	1. Vivian Hill; 2. Gerard Goiran	7,107	3.0	+0.2
Family First	1. Jim McCourt; 2. David Bolt	5,724	2.4	+2.4
One Nation	1. James Hopkinson; 2. Maureen Gordon	4,861	2.0	−8.0
Democrats	1. Robyn Danski; 2. Paul McCutcheon	1,968	0.8	−3.3
Liberals for Forests	1. Sarah Berry; 2. Claire Hart	1,863	0.8	+0.8
Independent	John Tucak	1,688	0.7	+0.5
Public Hospital Support Group	1. Colin Ross; 2. Avril Ross	1,305	0.5	+0.5
Group B	1. Annolies Truman; 2. Emma Clancy	695	0.3	+0.3
New Country	1. Laurissa Lockett; 2. John Mania	469	0.2	+0.2
Citizens Electoral Council	Daniel Stevens	317	0.1	+0.1
Independent	John Button	134	0.1	+0.1
Independent	Sylvia Yarnda Mnyirrinna	59	0.02	+0.02
Total formal votes		240,897	96.5	−0.6
Informal votes		8,626	3.5	+0.6
Turnout		249,523	91.3	−0.7

=== 2001 ===
2001 Western Australian state election: East Metropolitan
Party	Candidate	Votes	%	±%
Quota		39,831		
Labor	1. Nick Griffiths (elected 1); 2. Ljiljanna Ravlich (elected 3); 3. Louise Pratt (elected 4); 4. John Carruthers; 5. Brad George; 6. Emiliano Barzotto	105,596	44.2	+8.1
Liberal	1. Peter Foss (elected 2); 2. Derrick Tomlinson (elected 5); 3. Bill Munro; 4. Deborah Hopper; 5. Ken Shephard	72,378	30.3	−10.2
One Nation	1. Robin Scott; 2. Marye Daniels	23,986	10.0	+10.0
Greens	1. Lee Bell; 2. Alison Xamon	15,379	6.4	+1.0
Democrats	1. Norm Kelly; 2. Julie Ward	9,754	4.1	−2.7
Christian Democrats	1. Gerard Goiran; 2. Derk Gans	6,616	2.8	+0.4
Curtin Labor Alliance	1. Megan Kirwan; 2. Simon Makin	2,605	1.1	+1.1
Independent	Joan Torr	1,779	0.7	+0.7
Independent	John Tucak	358	0.2	+0.2
Independent	Tom Hoyer	339	0.1	+0.1
Independent	1. Alan Bateson; 2. Linda Bateson	193	0.1	+0.1
Total formal votes		238,983	97.1	+0.4
Informal votes		7,088	2.9	−0.4
Turnout		246,071	92.0	+0.4

=== 1996 ===
1996 Western Australian state election: East Metropolitan
Party	Candidate	Votes	%	±%
Quota		36,549		
Liberal	1. Peter Foss (elected 1); 2. Derrick Tomlinson (elected 3); 3. Nick Bruining; 4. Kent Murphy; 5. Kristine McConnell	88,820	40.5	−1.5
Labor	1. Nick Griffiths (elected 2); 2. Ljiljanna Ravlich (elected 4); 3. Kate Doust; 4. Jane Saunders; 5. Brad George; 6. Paul Sulc	79,200	36.1	−10.1
Democrats	1. Norm Kelly (elected 5); 2. Julie Ward	14,808	6.8	+3.6
Greens	1. Rowena Skinner; 2. Wayne Dierden	11,852	5.4	+3.4
Independent	Graeme Harris	11,483	5.2	+5.2
Marijuana	Mark Schneider	7,128	3.3	+3.3
Call to Australia	1. Gerard Goiran; 2. Derk Gans	5,164	2.4	+2.4
Natural Law	1. Jody Nielsen; 2. Patti Roberts	835	0.4	+0.4
Total formal votes		219,290	96.7	−0.6
Informal votes		7,441	3.3	+0.6
Turnout		226,731	91.6	−2.6

=== 1993 ===
1993 Western Australian state election: East Metropolitan
Party	Candidate	Votes	%	±%
Quota		32,822		
Labor	1. Alannah MacTiernan (elected 1); 2. Tom Butler (elected 3); 3. Nick Griffiths (elected 5); 4. Michelle Roberts; 5. Valma Ferguson; 6. Paul Sulc	90,982	46.20	−1.07
Liberal	1. Peter Foss (elected 2); 2. Derrick Tomlinson (elected 4); 3. Robert Van Straalen; 4. Nicholas Bruining	82,661	41.98	+5.44
Independent	John Tucak	7,614	3.87	+3.87
Democrats	1. Brian Jenkins; 2. Jean Ritter	6,361	3.23	−0.39
Greens	1. Mark Schneider; 2. Lorraine Johnston	4,020	2.04	−0.88
National	1. Mark Forecast; 2. Otto Weber	2,835	1.44	−0.86
Grey Power	Arthur Robertson	1,811	0.92	−4.93
Republican	Kevin Cloghan	643	0.33	+0.33
Total formal votes		196,927	97.26	+0.16
Informal votes		5,538	2.74	−0.16
Turnout		202,465	94.16	

=== 1989 ===
1989 Western Australian state election: East Metropolitan
Party	Candidate	Votes	%	±%
Quota		30,318		
Labor	1. Kay Hallahan (elected 1); 2. Fred McKenzie (elected 3); 3. Tom Butler (elected 5); 4. Valma Ferguson; 5. Erik Van Garderen; 6. Stephen Gilchrist	85,987	47.27	
Liberal	1. Derrick Tomlinson (elected 2); 2. Peter Foss (elected 4); 3. June van de Klashorst; 4. Peter Quinn	66,472	36.54	
Grey Power	1. Neil Turner; 2. Arthur Robertson	10,643	5.85	
Democrats	1. Pauline Hutchinson; 2. Benjamin Rose	6,586	3.62	
Greens	1. L G Capill; 2. Patsy Molloy	5,320	2.92	
National	1. Patrick Harding; 2. Beverley Poor	4,179	2.30	
One Australia Movement	1. Donald Jackson; 2. Ronald Abbott	2,720	1.50	
Total formal votes		181,907	97.10	
Informal votes		5,427	2.90	
Turnout		187,334	91.84	
