= Women in the Western Australian Legislative Council =

There have been 54 women in the Western Australian Legislative Council since its creation in 1832. Women have had the right to vote since 1899 and the right to stand as candidates since 1920.

The first successful female candidate for the Legislative Council was Ruby Hutchison, who was elected as one of the members for Metropolitan-Suburban Province in 1954, representing the Labor Party. Since then, women have been continuously represented in the Legislative Council; when Hutchison retired in 1971, she was succeeded by Lyla Elliott. Margaret McAleer became the first Liberal woman in the Council in 1974, and Winifred Piesse became the first Country Party woman in 1977.

In 1997, the first women representing minor parties were elected to the Council: Helen Hodgson for the Australian Democrats, and Chrissy Sharp and Giz Watson for the Greens WA.

== List of women in the Western Australian Legislative Council ==
Names in bold indicate women who have been appointed as Ministers and Parliamentary Secretaries during their time in Parliament. Names in italics indicate entry into Parliament through a by-election or by appointment and * symbolises members that have sat as members in both the Legislative Council and the Legislative Assembly.

#	Name	Party	Province/Region	Period of service
1	Ruby Hutchison	Labor	Suburban; North-East Metropolitan	22 May 1954 – 22 May 1965; 22 May 1965 – 21 May 1971 (retired)
2	Lyla Elliott	Labor	North-East Metropolitan	22 May 1971 – 21 May 1986 (retired)
3	Margaret McAleer	Liberal	Upper West; Agricultural	22 May 1974 – 22 May 1989; 22 May 1989 – 21 May 1993 (retired)
3	Grace Vaughan	Labor	South-East Metropolitan	22 May 1974 – 21 May 1980 (defeated)
5	Winifred Piesse	NCP/National	Lower Central	22 May 1977 – 21 May 1983 (defeated)
6	**Kay Hallahan***	Labor	South-East Metropolitan; East Metropolitan	22 May 1983 – 22 May 1989; 22 May 1989 – 13 January 1993 (resigned to contest LA)
7	Beryl Jones	Labor	Lower West; South West	22 May 1986 – 22 May 1989; 22 May 1989 – 21 May 1993 (retired)
8	Cheryl Davenport	Labor	South Metropolitan	22 May 1989 – 21 May 2001 (retired)
8	Muriel Patterson	Liberal	South West	22 May 1989 – 21 May 2001 (retired)
10	Diane Airey	Liberal	South Metropolitan	2 February 1993 – 21 May 1993 (term expired)
10	Valma Ferguson	Labor	East Metropolitan	2 February 1993 – 21 May 1993 (term expired); 4 April 1995 – 21 May 1997 (retired)
12	**Alannah MacTiernan***	Labor	East Metropolitan; North Metropolitan	22 May 1993 – 21 November 1996 (resigned to contest LA); 22 May 2017 – 10 February 2023 (resigned)
12	Barbara Scott	Liberal	South Metropolitan	22 May 1993 – 21 May 2009 (retired)
14	Helen Hodgson	Democrats	North Metropolitan	22 May 1997 – 21 May 2001 (defeated)
14	**Ljiljanna Ravlich**	Labor	East Metropolitan; North Metropolitan	22 May 1997 – 21 May 2013; 22 May 2013 – 10 March 2015 (resigned)
14	Chrissy Sharp	Greens	South West	22 May 1997 – 21 May 2005 (retired)
14	Giz Watson	Greens	North Metropolitan	22 May 1997 – 21 May 2013 (defeated)
18	**Kate Doust**	Labor	South Metropolitan	22 May 2001 –
18	**Sue Ellery**	Labor	South Metropolitan	22 May 2001 – 21 May 2025 (retired)
18	**Adele Farina**	Labor	South West	22 May 2001 – 21 May 2021 (retired)
18	Dee Margetts	Greens	Agricultural	22 May 2001 – 21 May 2005 (defeated)
18	**Robyn McSweeney**	Liberal	South West	22 May 2001 – 21 May 2017 (defeated)
18	Louise Pratt	Labor	East Metropolitan	22 May 2001 – 29 October 2007 (resigned to contest Senate)
24	Lynn MacLaren	Greens	South Metropolitan	15 February 2005 – 21 May 2005 (defeated); 22 May 2009 – 21 May 2017 (defeated)
25	Shelley Archer	Labor/Independent	Mining and Pastoral	22 May 2005 – 21 May 2009 (retired)
25	**Donna Faragher**	Liberal	East Metropolitan	22 May 2005 –
25	Sheila Mills	Labor	South Metropolitan	22 May 2005 – 21 May 2009 (retired)
25	**Helen Morton**	Liberal	East Metropolitan	22 May 2005 – 21 May 2017 (defeated)
25	Margaret Rowe	Liberal	Agricultural	22 May 2005 – 22 June 2007 (resigned)
25	Sally Talbot	Labor	South West	22 May 2005 –
31	**Wendy Duncan***	National	Agricultural; Mining and Pastoral	21 January 2008 – 22 May 2009; 22 May 2009 – 12 February 2013 (resigned to contest LA)
32	Carolyn Burton	Labor	North Metropolitan	12 September 2008 – 21 May 2009 (term expired)
33	Shelley Eaton	Labor	Mining and Pastoral	17 September 2008 – 21 May 2009 (term expired)
34	Liz Behjat	Liberal	North Metropolitan	22 May 2009 – 21 May 2017 (retired)
34	Helen Bullock	Labor	Mining and Pastoral	22 May 2009 – 21 May 2013 (retired)
34	Mia Davies*	National	Agricultural	22 May 2009 – 12 February 2013 (resigned to contest LA)
34	**Alyssa Hayden***	Liberal	East Metropolitan	22 May 2009 – 21 May 2017 (defeated)
34	Alison Xamon	Greens	East Metropolitan; North Metropolitan	22 May 2009 – 21 May 2013 (defeated); 22 May 2017 – 21 May 2021 (defeated)
39	Linda Savage	Labor	East Metropolitan	22 March 2010 – 21 May 2013 (retired)
40	Jacqui Boydell	National	Mining and Pastoral	22 May 2013 – 21 May 2021 (retired)
40	Alanna Clohesy	Labor	East Metropolitan	22 May 2013 –
40	Samantha Rowe	Labor	East Metropolitan	22 May 2013 –
40	Amber-Jade Sanderson*	Labor	East Metropolitan	22 May 2013 – 5 February 2017 (resigned to contest LA)
44	Laine McDonald	Labor	North Metropolitan	27 September 2016 – 21 May 2017 (defeated)
45	Elise Irwin	Liberal	North Metropolitan	4 April 2017 – 21 May 2017 (term expired)
46	Diane Evers	Greens	South West	22 May 2017 – 21 May 2021 (defeated)
47	Klara Andric	Labor	South Metropolitan	22 May 2021 –
47	Sandra Carr	Labor	Agricultural	22 May 2021 –
47	Ayor Makur Chuot	Labor	North Metropolitan	22 May 2021 –
47	Lorna Harper	Labor	East Metropolitan	22 May 2021 –
47	**Jackie Jarvis**	Labor	South West	22 May 2021 –
47	Sophia Moermond	Legalise Cannabis	Agricultural	22 May 2021 –
47	Shelley Payne	Labor	Agricultural	22 May 2021 –
47	Rosetta Sahanna	Labor	Mining and Pastoral	22 May 2021 –

== Proportion of women in the Assembly ==
Numbers and proportions are as they were directly after the relevant election and do not take into account by-elections, defections or other changes in membership. The Liberal column also includes that party's predecessors, the Liberal and Country League. The National column includes the various National Party splinter groups in the 1980s.

Term	Labor			Liberal			National			Others			Total		
Term	Women	Total	%	Women	Total	%	Women	Total	%	Women	Total	%	Women	Total	%
1954–1956	1	13	7.7%	0	9	0.0%	0	8	0.0%	0	0	0.0%	1	30	3.3%
1956–1958	1	13	7.7%	0	9	0.0%	0	8	0.0%	0	0	0.0%	1	30	3.3%
1958–1960	1	13	7.7%	0	9	0.0%	0	8	0.0%	0	0	0.0%	1	30	3.3%
1960–1962	1	13	7.7%	0	9	0.0%	0	8	0.0%	0	0	0.0%	1	30	3.3%
1962–1965	1	13	7.7%	0	10	0.0%	0	7	0.0%	0	0	0.0%	1	30	3.3%
1965–1968	1	10	10.0%	0	12	0.0%	0	8	0.0%	0	0	0.0%	1	30	3.3%
1968–1971	1	10	10.0%	0	12	0.0%	0	8	0.0%	0	0	0.0%	1	30	3.3%
1971–1974	1	10	10.0%	0	13	0.0%	0	7	0.0%	0	0	0.0%	1	30	3.3%
1974–1977	2	9	22.2%	1	18	5.6%	0	3	0.0%	0	0	0.0%	3	30	10.0%
1977–1980	2	10	20.0%	1	18	5.6%	1	4	25.0%	0	0	0.0%	4	32	12.5%
1980–1983	1	9	11.1%	1	19	5.3%	1	4	25.0%	0	0	0.0%	3	32	9.4%
1983–1986	2	13	15.4%	1	19	5.3%	0	2	0.0%	0	0	0.0%	3	34	8.8%
1986–1989	2	16	12.5%	1	14	7.1%	0	4	0.0%	0	0	0.0%	3	34	8.8%
1989–1993	3	16	18.8%	2	15	13.3%	0	3	0.0%	0	0	0.0%	5	34	14.7%
1993–1997	2	14	14.3%	2	15	13.3%	0	3	0.0%	0	2	0.0%	4	34	11.8%
1997–2001	2	12	16.7%	2	14	14.3%	0	3	0.0%	3	5	60.0%	7	34	20.6%
2001–2005	5	13	38.5%	2	12	16.7%	0	1	0.0%	3	8	37.5%	10	34	29.4%
2005–2009	8	16	50.0%	5	15	33.3%	0	1	0.0%	1	2	50.0%	14	34	41.2%
2009–2013	6	11	54.5%	5	16	31.3%	2	5	40.0%	3	4	75.0%	16	36	44.4%
2013–2017	8	11	72.7%	5	17	29.4%	1	5	20.0%	1	3	33.3%	15	36	41.7%
2017–2021	7	14	50.0%	1	9	11.1%	1	4	25.0%	2	9	22.2%	11	36	30.6%
2021–2025	13	22	59.1%	1	7	14.3%	0	3	0.0%	1	4	25.0%	15	36	41.7%
2025–	11	16	68.8%	2	10	20.0%	1	2	50.0%	4	9	44.4%	18	37	48.6%
