= List of Western Australian Legislative Council casual vacancies =

This is a list of casual vacancies in the Western Australian Legislative Council since 1989. Casual vacancies in the Legislative Council are filled by a countback of all votes.

Date	Electorate	Outgoing member	Party	Reason for vacancy	Incoming member	Party
2 April 2025	South Metropolitan	Stephen Pratt	Labor	Resigned to contest Legislative Assembly seat of Jandakot	Victoria Helps	Labor
19 September 2023	South West	James Hayward	National	Disqualified	Louise Kingston	National
20 March 2023	South West	Alannah MacTiernan	Labor	Resigned	Ben Dawkins	Independent
6 February 2017	North Metropolitan	Peter Katsambanis	Liberal	Resigned to contest Legislative Assembly seat of Hillarys	Elise Irwin	Liberal
5 February 2017	East Metropolitan	Amber-Jade Sanderson	Labor	Resigned to contest Legislative Assembly seat of Morley	Bill Leadbetter	Labor
29 August 2016	North Metropolitan	Ken Travers	Labor	Resigned	Laine McDonald	Labor
10 March 2015	North Metropolitan	Ljiljanna Ravlich	Labor	Resigned	Martin Pritchard	Labor
12 February 2013	Agricultural	Mia Davies	National	Resigned to contest Legislative Assembly seat of Central Wheatbelt	Martin Aldridge	National
12 February 2013	Mining and Pastoral	Wendy Duncan	National	Resigned to contest Legislative Assembly seat of Kalgoorlie	Dave Grills	National
13 February 2010	East Metropolitan	Jock Ferguson	Labor	Died in office	Linda Savage	Labor
12 August 2008	Mining and Pastoral	Vince Catania	Labor	Resigned to contest Legislative Assembly seat of North West	Shelley Eaton	Labor
11 August 2008	North Metropolitan	Graham Giffard	Labor	Resigned to contest Legislative Assembly seat of Swan Hills	Carolyn Burton	Labor
2 January 2008	Agricultural	Murray Criddle	National	Resigned	Wendy Duncan	National
29 October 2007	East Metropolitan	Louise Pratt	Labor	Resigned to contest the Senate	Batong Pham	Labor
22 June 2007	Agricultural	Margaret Rowe	Liberal	Resigned	Brian Ellis	Liberal
20 January 2005	South Metropolitan	Jim Scott	Greens	Resigned to contest Legislative Assembly seat of Fremantle	Lynn MacLaren	Greens
28 September 2004	Mining and Pastoral	Tom Stephens	Labor	Resigned to contest federal seat of Kalgoorlie	Kevin Leahy	Labor
20 January 2000	South Metropolitan	John Halden	Labor	Resigned to take up the position of Labor Party State President.	Graham Giffard	Labor
28 July 1998	Agricultural	Eric Charlton	National	Resigned	Dexter Davies	National
21 November 1996	East Metropolitan	Alannah MacTiernan	Labor	Resigned to contest Legislative Assembly seat of Armadale	Paul Sulc	Labor
19 November 1996	North Metropolitan	Iain MacLean	Liberal	Resigned to contest Legislative Assembly seat of Wanneroo	Alan Carstairs	Liberal
19 November 1996	North Metropolitan	Sam Piantadosi	Independent	Resigned to contest Legislative Assembly seat of Yokine	Ed Dermer	Labor
28 February 1995	East Metropolitan	Tom Butler	Labor	Resigned	Valma Ferguson	Labor
26 April 1994	North Metropolitan	Bob Pike	Liberal	Died in office	Iain MacLean	Liberal
14 January 1993	South Metropolitan	Phillip Pendal	Liberal	Resigned to contest Legislative Assembly seat of South Perth	Diane Airey	Liberal
13 January 1993	East Metropolitan	Kay Hallahan	Labor	Resigned to contest Legislative Assembly seat of Armadale	Valma Ferguson	Labor
3 March 1992	Agricultural	Jim Brown	Labor	Resigned	Kim Chance	Labor

== See also ==
- WA Electoral Commission - Past Elections
- Members of the Western Australian Legislative Council
