= Members of the Western Australian Legislative Council, 2005–2009 =

This is a list of members of the Western Australian Legislative Council between 22 May 2005 and 21 May 2009:

| Name | Party | Province | Years in office |
|---|---|---|---|
| Shelley Archer | Labor/Independent ^{[3]} | Mining and Pastoral | 2005–2009 |
| Ken Baston | Liberal | Mining and Pastoral | 2005–2021 |
| Matt Benson-Lidholm | Labor | South West | 2005–2013 |
| Carolyn Burton^{[6]} | Labor | North Metropolitan | 2008–2009 |
| George Cash | Liberal | North Metropolitan | 1989–2009 |
| Vince Catania^{[7]} | Labor | Mining and Pastoral | 2005–2009 |
| Kim Chance | Labor | Agricultural | 1992–2009 |
| Peter Collier | Liberal | North Metropolitan | 2005–present |
| Murray Criddle^{[4]} | National | Agricultural | 1993–2008 |
| Ed Dermer | Labor | North Metropolitan | 1996–2013 |
| Bruce Donaldson | Liberal | Agricultural | 1993–2009 |
| Kate Doust | Labor | South Metropolitan | 2001–present |
| Wendy Duncan^{[4]} | National | Agricultural | 2008–2013 |
| Shelley Eaton^{[7]} | Labor | Mining and Pastoral | 2008–2009 |
| Sue Ellery | Labor | South Metropolitan | 2001–present |
| Brian Ellis^{[1]} | Liberal | Agricultural | 2007–2017 |
| Donna Faragher | Liberal | East Metropolitan | 2005–present |
| Adele Farina | Labor | South West | 2001–present |
| Anthony Fels | Liberal/Independent^{[5]} | Agricultural | 2005–2009 |
| Jon Ford | Labor | Mining and Pastoral | 2001–2013 |
| Graham Giffard^{[6]} | Labor | North Metropolitan | 2000–2008 |
| Nick Griffiths | Labor | East Metropolitan | 1993–2009 |
| Nigel Hallett | Liberal | South West | 2005–2017 |
| Ray Halligan | Liberal | North Metropolitan | 1997–2009 |
| Barry House | Liberal | South West | 1987–2017 |
| Paul Llewellyn | Greens | South West | 2005–2009 |
| Robyn McSweeney | Liberal | South West | 2001–2017 |
| Sheila Mills | Labor | South Metropolitan | 2005–2009 |
| Norman Moore | Liberal | Mining and Pastoral | 1977–2013 |
| Helen Morton | Liberal | East Metropolitan | 2005–2017 |
| Simon O'Brien | Liberal | South Metropolitan | 1997–2021 |
| Batong Pham^{[2]} | Labor | East Metropolitan | 2007–2009 |
| Louise Pratt^{[2]} | Labor | East Metropolitan | 2001–2007 |
| Ljiljanna Ravlich | Labor | East Metropolitan | 1997–2015 |
| Margaret Rowe^{[1]} | Liberal | Agricultural | 2005–2007 |
| Barbara Scott | Liberal | South Metropolitan | 1993–2009 |
| Sally Talbot | Labor | South West | 2005–present |
| Ken Travers | Labor | North Metropolitan | 1997–2016 |
| Giz Watson | Greens | North Metropolitan | 1997–2013 |

== Notes ==
^{1} Agricultural Liberal MLC Margaret Rowe resigned on 22 June 2007. Brian Ellis was elected in the resulting countback on 16 July 2007.
^{2} East Metropolitan Labor MLC Louise Pratt resigned on 29 October 2007 to run for the Australian Senate at the 2007 federal election. Batong Pham was elected in the resulting countback on 26 November.
^{3} Mining and Pastoral MLC Shelley Archer was elected as a Labor member, but resigned from the party on 15 November 2007 after Premier Alan Carpenter called for her expulsion from parliament over an ongoing corruption scandal. She served out her term as an Independent and, despite initial suggestions to the contrary, did not recontest.
^{4} Agricultural National MLC Murray Criddle resigned on 2 January 2008. Wendy Duncan was elected in the resulting countback on 29 January 2008.
^{5} Agricultural MLC Anthony Fels was elected as a Liberal member, but resigned from the party on 31 July 2008. He subsequently sat as an independent and recontested his seat unsuccessfully at the 2008 election as a WAFamilyFirst.com Party candidate.
^{6} North Metropolitan Labor MLC Graham Giffard resigned on 11 August 2008 in order to contest the Assembly seat of Swan Hills in the election, where he was beaten by the Liberals' Frank Alban. Carolyn Burton was elected in the resulting countback on 12 September 2008.
^{7} Mining and Pastoral Labor MLC Vince Catania resigned on 12 August 2008 in order to contest the Assembly seat of North West in the election; he was elected. Shelley Eaton was elected in the resulting countback on 17 September 2008.
