= Members of the Western Australian Legislative Council, 2021–2025 =

Members of the Western Australian Legislative Council, 2021-2025

Government (22) Labor (22) Opposition (10) Liberal (7) National (3) Crossbench (4) Legalise Cannabis (2) Greens (1) Daylight Saving (1)

This is a list of members of the Western Australian Legislative Council elected to serve a term between 22 May 2021 and 21 May 2025.

Name	Party	Region	Term in office
Martin Aldridge	National	Agricultural	2013–present
Klara Andric	Labor	South Metropolitan	2021–present
Dan Caddy	Labor	North Metropolitan	2021–present
Sandra Carr	Labor	Agricultural	2021–present
Alanna Clohesy	Labor	East Metropolitan	2013–present
Peter Collier	Liberal	North Metropolitan	2005–present
Ben Dawkins^{[2]}	Independent/One Nation/Independent^{[5]}	South West	2023–present
Stephen Dawson	Labor	Mining and Pastoral	2013–present
Colin de Grussa	National	Agricultural	2017–present
Kate Doust	Labor	South Metropolitan	2001–present
Sue Ellery	Labor	South Metropolitan	2001–present
Donna Faragher	Liberal	East Metropolitan	2005–present
Peter Foster	Labor	Mining and Pastoral	2021–present
Nick Goiran	Liberal	South Metropolitan	2009–present
Lorna Harper	Labor	East Metropolitan	2021–present
James Hayward^{[4]}	National/Independent^{[1]}	South West	2021–2023
Vicki Helps^{[8]}	Labor	South Metropolitan	2025–present
Jackie Jarvis	Labor	South West	2021–present
Louise Kingston^{[4]}	National/Independent^{[7]}	South West	2023–present
Alannah MacTiernan^{[2]}	Labor	South West	1993–1996, 2017–2023
Ayor Makur Chuot	Labor	North Metropolitan	2021–present
Steve Martin	Liberal	Agricultural	2021–present
Kyle McGinn	Labor	Mining and Pastoral	2017–present
Sophia Moermond	Legalise Cannabis/Independent^{[6]}	South West	2021–present
Shelley Payne	Labor	Agricultural	2021–present
Brad Pettitt	Greens	South Metropolitan	2021–present
Stephen Pratt^{[8]}	Labor	South Metropolitan	2021–2025
Martin Pritchard	Labor	North Metropolitan	2015–present
Samantha Rowe	Labor	East Metropolitan	2013–present
Rosetta Sahanna	Labor	Mining and Pastoral	2021–present
Tjorn Sibma	Liberal	North Metropolitan	2017–present
Matthew Swinbourn	Labor	East Metropolitan	2017–present
Sally Talbot	Labor	South West	2005–present
Steve Thomas	Liberal	South West	2017–present
Neil Thomson	Liberal	Mining and Pastoral	2021–present
Wilson Tucker	Daylight Saving/Independent^{[3]}	Mining and Pastoral	2021–present
Brian Walker	Legalise Cannabis	East Metropolitan	2021–present
Darren West	Labor	Agricultural	2013–present
Pierre Yang	Labor	North Metropolitan	2017–present

^{1} South West National MLC James Hayward was suspended from the party on 2 December 2021 and resigned the following day to sit as an independent.
^{2} South West Labor MLC Alannah MacTiernan resigned on 10 February 2023. Ben Dawkins was elected to replace her in a countback on 20 March 2023; although he had run as a Labor candidate, he had been suspended from the party and sat as an independent.
^{3} The Daylight Saving Party allowed its registration to lapse on 20 February 2023, and Mining and Pastoral MLC Wilson Tucker became an independent.
^{4} South West Independent MLC James Hayward was convicted of sexual misconduct on 28 August 2023, which caused his seat to be declared vacant. National candidate Louise Kingston was elected in a countback on 19 September 2023.
^{5} South West Independent MLC Ben Dawkins joined Pauline Hanson's One Nation on 29 February 2024. He resigned from that party on 19 December 2024 and once more sat as an independent.
^{6} South West Legalise Cannabis MLC Sophia Moermond resigned from the party to sit as an independent on 9 May 2024.
^{7} South West National MLC Louise Kingston resigned from the party to sit as an independent on 20 June 2024.
^{8} South Metropolitan Labor MLC Stephen Pratt resigned on 11 February 2025 to contest the Legislative Assembly. Vicki Helps was elected to replace him in a countback on 2 April 2025.
