= Amber-Jade Sanderson =

Australian politician (born 1976)

The Honourable Amber-Jade Sanderson MLA

Minister for Health
- In office 21 December 2021 – 19 March 2025
- Premier: Mark McGowan; Roger Cook
- Preceded by: Roger Cook
- Succeeded by: Meredith Hammat

Minister for Mental Health
- Incumbent
- Assumed office 21 December 2021
- Premier: Mark McGowan; Roger Cook
- Preceded by: Roger Cook

Minister for Environment
- In office 19 March 2021 – 21 December 2021
- Premier: Mark McGowan
- Preceded by: Stephen Dawson
- Succeeded by: Reece Whitby

Minister for Climate Action
- In office 19 March 2021 – 21 December 2021
- Premier: Mark McGowan
- Preceded by: New office
- Succeeded by: Reece Whitby

Minister for Commerce
- In office 19 March 2021 – 21 December 2021
- Premier: Mark McGowan
- Preceded by: John Quigley
- Succeeded by: Roger Cook

Member of the Western Australian Legislative Assembly for Morley
- Incumbent
- Assumed office 11 March 2017
- Preceded by: Ian Britza

Member of the Western Australian Legislative Council for East Metropolitan Region
- In office 22 May 2013 – 5 February 2017

Personal details
- Born: 25 October 1976 (age 49) Mascot, New South Wales, Australia
- Party: Labor
- Education: Cardiff University
- Website: www.amberjadesanderson.com.au

Amber-Jade Sanderson (born 25 October 1976) is an Australian Labor Party politician who is the member for Morley in the Western Australian Legislative Assembly, the lower house of the Parliament of Western Australia. Since 21 December 2021, she has been Minister for Health and Minister for Mental health. From 19 March 2021 to 21 December 2021, she was Minister for Environment, Minister for Climate Action and Minister for Commerce. She rose to prominence when she chaired the Joint Select Committee on End of Life Choices. From 22 May 2013 to 5 February 2017, she was a member of the Western Australian Legislative Council, the upper house of the Parliament of Western Australia, for the East Metropolitan Region.

== Early life and career ==
Amber-Jade Sanderson was born on 25 October 1976 in Mascot, New South Wales, a suburb of Sydney. Her parents were Ten Pound Poms who had immigrated from England to Perth as teenagers during the 1970s. She spent her early childhood in Bayswater, Western Australia, a suburb of Perth. When she was about five years old, her parents separated. She moved to London with her mother in 1986, and started living in England for the most part over the following 14 years. She attended eight or nine different schools in total, including St Columba's School, Bayswater Primary School and John Forrest Secondary College in Morley.

At Cardiff University, Sanderson studied journalism with a focus on politics. She then worked in public affairs in London. In 2001, she moved back to Perth and started working as a media advisor for the federal member for Fremantle, Carmen Lawrence. Sanderson's parents and siblings moved to Perth a couple of years later. For about ten years, Sanderson worked for the Liquor, Hospitality and Miscellaneous Union (renamed in 2011 to United Voice), rising as far as assistant state secretary.

== Political career ==
=== Backbench ===
Soon after becoming assistant secretary of United Voice, Sanderson was preselected by the Labor Party as the third candidate on their ticket for the East Metropolitan Region of the Western Australian Legislative Council, the upper house of the Parliament of Western Australia. She was elected at the 2013 state election, with her term commencing on 22 May 2013.

From 16 October 2013 to 5 February 2017, Sanderson was deputy chair of committees.

On 5 February 2017, Sanderson resigned from the Legislative Council in order to run for the Western Australian Legislative Assembly (lower house) seat of Morley. The seat was traditionally a Labor seat, but it had been won at the previous two elections by Liberal MP Ian Britza. She was elected to that seat at the 2017 election with 61.4% of the two-party-preferred vote and a 16.2% two-party-preferred swing.

From 17 March 2017 to 19 March 2021, Sanderson was the parliamentary secretary to Mark McGowan, who was the premier, minister for public sector management, minister for state development, jobs and trade, and minister for federal-state relations, as well as parliamentary secretary of the cabinet.

==== Voluntary assisted dying ====
In August 2017, Sanderson moved a motion for the establishment of the Joint Select Committee on End of Life Choices, with the purpose of reporting on the "need for laws in Western Australia to allow citizens to make informed decisions regarding their own end of life choices". The motion passed, and so from 23 August 2017 to 23 August 2018, she was on that committee, including as chair from 4 September 2017. This committee presented the "My Life, My Choice" report in August 2018, recommending voluntary assisted dying be allowed when "grievous and irremediable suffering related to an advanced and progressive terminal, chronic or neurodegenerative condition [...] where death is a reasonably foreseeable outcome of the condition". Parliament later passed voluntary assisted dying into law, and Sanderson's role in this gained her prominence and speculation that she would one day become the minister for health or premier.

=== Cabinet ===
At the 2021 state election on 13 March 2021, Sanderson was re-elected as the member for Morley, with a two-party-preferred vote of 78.6% and a two-party-preferred swing of 16.2%. Five days later, she joined the Western Australian cabinet when she was appointed as the minister for commerce, minister for environment and the newly created position of minister for climate action. She relinquished those ministries when, on 21 December 2021, Sanderson became the minister for health and mental health, replacing Roger Cook. Reece Whitby succeeded Sanderson as the minister for environment and minister for climate Action, and Roger Cook succeeded her as the minister for commerce.

==== Nurses union ====
During 2022 and 2023, Sanderson has been having conflicts with the Australian Nursing Federation (ANF) over the pay rates and work conditions for nurses. The ANF was demanding a 10 percent annual pay rise, above the government-wide three percent set out in the public sector wages policy. Other demands were for the one-off $3,000 "cost of living" payment to be increased to $4,500 and the institution of nurse-to-patient and midwife-to-patient ratios. Starting in October 2022, the ANF began a seven-week series of escalating industrial action. Sanderson said "my message to the ANF and to nursing staff is stand down, it is not necessary to take such extraordinary industrial action at this point". Sanderson then offered the ANF that the nurse-to-patient ratios be implemented but no change to the pay rise, which the union voted overwhelmingly to reject.

By 22 November, the ANF had changed its pay rise demands to a five percent pay rise. The ANF and the government had still not reached a deal after that, so over 3,500 ANF members went on strike from 7 am to 9 pm on 25 November, despite an order from the Western Australian Industrial Relations Commission not to go on strike. This was Western Australia's first nurses strike since 1998, and led to the cancellation of hundreds of elective surgeries. The ANF was fined $350,000 for disobeying the Industrial Relations Commission.

==== Maternity hospital ====
In 2019, previous Health Minister Roger Cook announced that the dilapidated King Edward Memorial Hospital for Women would be closed and a new maternity hospital would open at Queen Elizabeth II Medical Centre (QEII), 4 kilometres (2.5 mi) west of the Perth central business district (CBD). Construction was due to begin in 2021. In April 2023 however, Sanderson announced that the hospital would instead be built next to Fiona Stanley Hospital in Murdoch, 16 kilometres (9.9 mi) south of the Perth CBD. Construction was planned to begin in 2024, and cost $1.8 billion. It was also revealed that Osborne Park Hospital north of Perth and Perth Children's Hospital at QEII would be expanded to offset the move south of the planned maternity hospital. The change of site was because the business case and project definition plan identified that the QEII site had too many risks to the project's timeline and would cause unacceptable disruption to patients at QEII.

The new site has been criticised for being too far away from the city, with the Australian Medical Association saying that neonatologists or senior clinicians were not consulted and that the decision was arrogant. Professor Karen Simmer, who formerly led Western Australia's neonatal intensive care units and coordinated emergency baby transfers, said the hospital's new location would increase the risk of death and disability to newborns as it was far away from Perth Children's Hospital, where those surgeries and intensive healthcare would take place. Sanderson defended the decision by saying "we did not consult with staff because we needed to make a decision and I was not prepared to delay the process anymore".

==== Abortion ====
In response to the United States overturning Roe v. Wade in June 2022, Sanderson stated that Western Australia's abortion laws were "outdated" and "probably not a model that’s fit for purpose now", but did not commit to changing them. At the time, women seeking an abortion after 20 weeks had to see an ethics panel consisting of six medical practitioners, two of whom must agree that either the mother or fetus has a severe medical condition that justifies the procedure. This caused many women to travel interstate to get an abortion. Other issues included that there were only two abortion service providers in the state and the high cost of the procedure. In November 2022, she announced that the government would decriminalise abortion and undertake a four-week consultation period to see how abortion laws could change. Potential changes included increasing the gestational age limit from 20 weeks to 24, removing the need to get a referral from a GP, and modifying mandatory counselling requirements.

==== 2023 Labor Party leadership ballot ====
Following Mark McGowan's announcement on 29 May 2023 of his imminent resignation as premier and Labor leader, Sanderson entered the ensuing leadership ballot as one of three candidates. She received backing from the United Workers Union (formerly United Voice) over Roger Cook, but the Australian Manufacturing Workers Union backed Cook over her. Sanderson withdrew from the contest after that, leaving Cook as the sole nominee for premier. Polling conducted in January 2023 by Painted Dog Research for The West Australian showed that Sanderson was favoured by 6 percent of voters to succeed McGowan if he were to retire, behind Cook at 15 percent and Rita Saffioti at 13 percent.

== Personal life ==
Sanderson lives with her partner Phillip in Bayswater. She has two children: her first child was with her previous husband whom she divorced during her first term in parliament; her second child was with her current partner.

Parliament of Western Australia
Preceded by Linda Savage; Alison Xamon	Member for East Metropolitan Region; 22 May 2013 – 5 February 2017; Served alongside: Alanna Clohesy, Samantha Rowe, Helen Morton, Donna Faragher, Alyssa Hayden	Succeeded by Bill Leadbetter
Preceded by Ian Britza	Member for Morley; 11 March 2017 – present	Incumbent
Political offices
Preceded by Stephen Dawson	Minister for Environment; 19 March 2021 – 21 December 2021	Succeeded by Reece Whitby
New title	Minister for Climate Action; 19 March 2021 – 21 December 2021	Succeeded by Reece Whitby
Preceded by John Quigley	Minister for Commerce; 19 March 2021 – 21 December 2021	Succeeded by Roger Cook
Preceded by Roger Cook	Minister for Health; 21 December 2021 – present	Incumbent
Preceded by Roger Cook	Minister for Mental Health; 21 December 2021 – present	Incumbent
