= Norman Kelly =

Norman Kelly may refer to:

- Norm Kelly (born 1941), Canadian politician
- Norm Kelly (Australian politician) (born 1959), Australian politician
- Norman Kelly (footballer) (born 1970), Northern Irish footballer

== See also ==
- Norman Kelley (1911–2006), American opera singer
