= Tim Clifford (politician) =

Australian politician (born 1982)

The Honourable Tim Clifford MLC
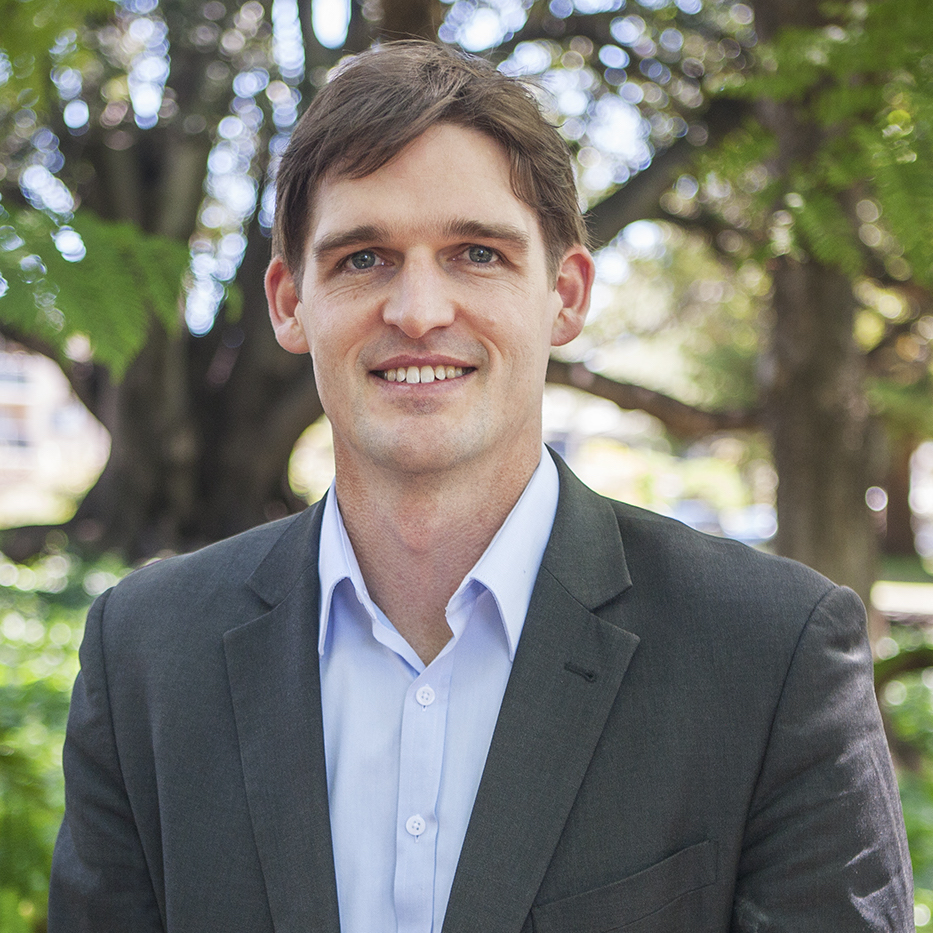

Member of the Western Australian Legislative Council
- Incumbent
- Assumed office 22 May 2025

Member of the Western Australian Legislative Council for East Metropolitan Region
- In office 22 May 2017 – 21 May 2021
- Preceded by: Helen Morton
- Succeeded by: Lorna Harper

Personal details
- Born: Timothy James Clifford; 31 March 1982 (age 44) Perth, Western Australia
- Party: Greens (WA)
- Education: Edith Cowan University
- Occupation: Politician, public servant
- Website: Greens WA

Timothy James Clifford (born 31 March 1982) is an Australian politician and member of the Western Australian Legislative Council. A member of Greens (WA), he was re-elected in 2025 after previously representing the East Metropolitan Region from 22 May 2017 to 21 May 2021.

== Early life and education ==
Clifford was born in Perth, Western Australia, but his family moved to Albany shortly after his birth. He grew up in a single-parent household alongside his three sisters, with his mother juggling work and the responsibility of raising four children. He has credited this experience with shaping his belief in the importance of a strong social safety net, quality public education, and accessible healthcare.

After completing high school, Clifford traveled extensively and also trained with the Army Reserve before entering the construction industry. He worked throughout Western Australia, spending six years in fly-in, fly-out (FIFO) roles, experiencing firsthand the boom and bust cycle of the mining industry.

Seeking to broaden his career, Clifford pursued studies in journalism and political science at Edith Cowan University while also becoming active in politics.

== Political career ==
=== Entry into politics ===
Clifford joined Greens (WA) in 2011 while still at university. He became actively involved in the party, serving as the Convenor of the Perth Regional Group and later as Co-convenor of the Election Campaign Committee.

Before being elected to parliament, Clifford stood as a Greens candidate in three elections:

- 2013 Western Australian state election – contested the seat of Mount Lawley
- 2013 Australian federal election – contested the Division of Stirling
- 2016 Australian federal election – contested the Division of Perth

=== Legislative Council (2017–2021, 2025–present) ===
At the 2017 Western Australian state election, Clifford was elected to the Legislative Council representing the East Metropolitan Region. His term began on 22 May 2017.

As an MP, Clifford focused on climate action, affordable housing, and social justice issues. In his inaugural speech, he highlighted his upbringing in Albany, his early employment in construction and mining, and the role of public services in supporting his family.

Clifford was defeated in his bid for re-election at the 2021 Western Australian state election, losing his seat when the Greens (WA) vote declined. His term ended on 21 May 2021.

Clifford returned to Parliament following his successful re-election at the 2025 Western Australian state election. He returns, along with three other Greens MLCs, who hold the balance of power in the Legislative Council.

In his 2025 inaugural address, which he described as a "second first speech," Clifford identified housing and homelessness as his top priorities, along with environmental protection and First Nations justice.

In June 2025, Clifford moved a motion in the Legislative Council requiring the government to report on the implementation of 57 recommendations from the 2023 "Funding of Homelessness Services" inquiry. The motion passed unanimously.

In August 2025, Clifford and the Greens parliamentary team referred the government's "post and boast" bill to a committee and tabled the Greens’ climate bill in the Upper House.

== Personal life ==
Clifford has lived in Perth for over 14 years and continues to be involved in environmental and social justice activism.
