= Alannah MacTiernan =

Australian politician (born 1953)

The Honourable Alannah MacTiernan MLC
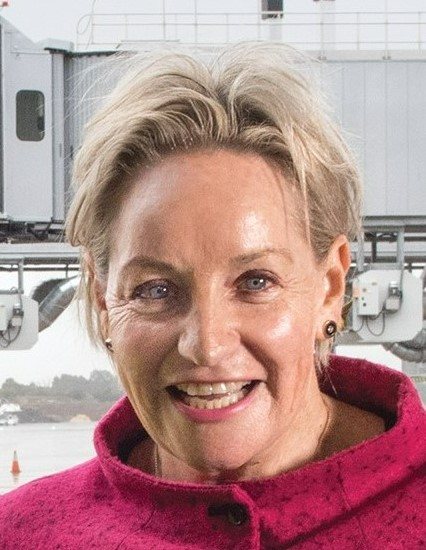

Minister for Planning and Infrastructure
- In office 16 February 2001 – 23 September 2008
- Premier: Geoff Gallop; Alan Carpenter

Minister for Regional Development
- In office 17 March 2017 – 14 December 2022
- Premier: Mark McGowan
- Preceded by: Terry Redman
- Succeeded by: Don Punch

Minister for Agriculture and Food
- In office 17 March 2017 – 14 December 2022
- Premier: Mark McGowan
- Preceded by: Mark Lewis
- Succeeded by: Jackie Jarvis

Minister for Ports
- In office 13 December 2018 – 19 March 2021
- Premier: Mark McGowan
- Succeeded by: Rita Saffioti

Minister for Hydrogen Industry
- In office 19 March 2021 – 14 December 2022
- Premier: Mark McGowan
- Succeeded by: Roger Cook

Member of the Western Australian Legislative Council for East Metropolitan Region
- In office 22 May 1993 – 21 November 1996 Serving with Tom Butler, Nick Griffiths, Peter Foss, Derrick Tomlinson, Valma Ferguson
- Preceded by: Kay Hallahan
- Succeeded by: Paul Sulc

Member of the Western Australian Legislative Assembly for Armadale
- In office 14 December 1996 – 20 July 2010
- Preceded by: Kay Hallahan
- Succeeded by: Tony Buti

Member of the Australian House of Representatives for Perth
- In office 7 September 2013 – 9 May 2016
- Preceded by: Stephen Smith
- Succeeded by: Tim Hammond

Member of the Western Australian Legislative Council for North Metropolitan Region
- In office 22 May 2017 – 22 May 2021 Serving with Peter Collier, Martin Pritchard, Michael Mischin, Alison Xamon, Tjorn Sibma
- Preceded by: Laine McDonald
- Succeeded by: Pierre Yang

Member of the Western Australian Legislative Council for South West Region
- In office 22 May 2021 – 10 February 2023 Serving with Sally Talbot, Steve Thomas, Jackie Jarvis, Sophia Moermond, James Hayward
- Preceded by: Adele Farina
- Succeeded by: Ben Dawkins

Mayor of the City of Vincent
- In office 2011–2013
- Preceded by: Nick Catania
- Succeeded by: John Carey

Personal details
- Born: Alannah Joan Geraldine Cecilia MacTiernan; 10 January 1953 (age 73) East Melbourne, Victoria, Australia
- Party: Australian Labor Party
- Education: University of Western Australia BA LLB B Juris
- Occupation: Lawyer

Alannah Joan Geraldine Cecilia MacTiernan (born 10 January 1953) is a former Australian politician. From 1988 to 2023, she has served in politics at a federal, state, and local level, including as a minister in the Western Australian state governments of Geoff Gallop, Alan Carpenter, and Mark McGowan. She is best known for her role as the minister for planning and infrastructure during the construction of the Mandurah line. Born in Melbourne, she moved to Perth to study at the University of Western Australia, graduating with a Bachelor of Arts and later with a law degree. She worked for the Department of Employment before practising as a lawyer between 1986 and 1992. During this time, she also served on the Perth City Council. In 1976, MacTiernan joined the Australian Labor Party, and at the 1993 Western Australian state election, she was elected to the Legislative Council's East Metropolitan Region. She became a shadow minister in October 1994, and she was transferred to the Legislative Assembly at the 1996 state election, winning the seat of Armadale.

After Labor won the 2001 state election, MacTiernan became the minister for planning and infrastructure. Early in this role, she changed the route of the proposed Perth to Mandurah rail line to a more direct but costlier route. She oversaw the signing of contracts, construction and commencement of services for the Mandurah line. She also commenced construction on the Kwinana Freeway and Forrest Highway bypass around Mandurah, extended Roe Highway and Tonkin Highway, and expanded Geraldton Port. After Labor lost the 2008 state election and Premier Carpenter resigned as Labor leader, she was one of the frontrunners to replace him, but she lost out to Eric Ripper.

She resigned from state parliament in 2010 in order to contest the seat of Canning in that year's federal election. After losing that election, she was elected the mayor of Vincent, in which she served for two years. She successfully contested the seat of Perth in the 2013 federal election, but only stayed in the federal parliament for three years as she declined to contest the 2016 federal election.

She again entered state parliament when she won election to the Legislative Council's North Metropolitan Region at the 2017 state election. She was made the minister for regional development and minister for agriculture after that election, and she later became the minister for ports as well. At the 2021 state election, she transferred to the South West Region and became the minister for hydrogen industry but relinquished ports. She was the subject of controversy in 2022 when she made comments saying that the Indonesian foot-and-mouth disease outbreak would be good for Australia. She resigned from cabinet in December 2022 and from parliament in February 2023.

== Early life and career ==
Alannah Joan Geraldine MacTiernan was born on 10 January 1953 in East Melbourne, Victoria, Australia. Her parents are Hugh Murrough Patrick MacTiernan, an Irish immigrant, and Dorothy Caroline MacTiernan (née Leahy). She grew up in Heidelberg West in the north-eastern suburbs of Melbourne, attending St Bernadette's Primary School, Ivanhoe, and Our Lady of Mercy College, Heidelberg. Aged 18, she moved to Western Australia, where she studied at the University of Western Australia. After graduating with a Bachelor of Arts, she worked in the Aboriginal Employment and Training branch of the Department of Employment. She also established and operated the Mount Lawley Maylands Express between 1981 and 1983, a local newspaper which later became the Guardian Express. In 1986, she completed a law degree. She then practised with law firm Dwyer Durack, becoming a partner there in 1992.

Before her election to parliament, she was a member of several community organisations, including the Perth Theatre Trust, Rod Evans Senior Citizens Centre, the Irish Club of WA, and the Irish–Australian Congress. From 1975 to 1994, she was involved in the University Women's Soccer Club, including as president, secretary, treasurer and patron. From 1989 to 1991, MacTiernan was an inaugural member of the Heritage Council of Western Australia.

== Early political career ==
MacTiernan joined the Australian Labor Party in 1976, as part of the university branch. She joined the Perth branch in 1979, and then formed the Highgate branch in 1981, where she was the secretary, vice-president, president and membership officer at various points. After forming the Inner City Residents Action Group, she was elected to the Perth City Council in May 1988. She stayed on the council until she was elected to parliament.

Ahead of the 1993 Western Australian state election, Kay Hallahan, an incumbent Labor member of the Legislative Council, chose to instead stand as a candidate in the Legislative Assembly. MacTiernan took Hallahan's spot as a Labor candidate for the council's East Metropolitan Region. MacTiernan won, and so she took her seat on 22 May 1993. In her inaugural speech, she criticised the existence of the Legislative Council, saying:

I propose to commence my career in this place by putting on record my belief that this House is an anachronism, and that its existence falsely suggests that important checks and balances required in the parliamentary democracy are in place. Accordingly, I take the view that this House should be abolished and that its membership and function be incorporated into an expanded Legislative Assembly... I take the view that ... this House in its very conception is undemocratic... This House has always fiercely protected property and conservative rural interests, which is hardly surprising given that it is the direct spiritual descendant of the House of Lords... [and] the Legislative Council has not during any period of conservative government this century provided any real fetter on the power of the Government of the day. Indeed, it has been the servant, or even the poodle, of the conservative Executive.

She became a shadow minister in October 1994, receiving the portfolio's of productivity, and labour relations. Adding to her existing shadow ministries, she became the shadow minister for construction industry in March 1996. The construction industry portfolio was renamed to housing construction in October 1996. When Hallahan announced her retirement from politics ahead of the 1996 state election, MacTiernan was selected to run in Hallahan's seat of Armadale. She resigned from the Legislative Council on 21 November 1996 and retained the seat of Armadale for the Labor Party at the election on 14 December.

Mactiernan became the shadow minister for transport, and fair trading in January 1997, and then the spokesperson for transport, and planning in August 1999. In March 1997, she joined the Public Accounts and Expenditure Review Committee. In September 1999 after the 1999 East Timorese independence referendum, she visited East Timor as a United Nations-accredited observer and she was stationed at Liquiçá. After returning to Western Australia, she participated in advancing East Timorese independence from Indonesia. She was a founding member of the East Timor WA Association.

== Cabinet 2001–2008 ==
Labor won the February 2001 state election, and the newly appointed premier Geoff Gallop made MacTiernan the Minister for Planning and Infrastructure. This was a newly created ministry, superseding the previous roles of Minister for Planning and Minister for Transport. She retained this role for the following eight years that Labor was in power, including when Gallop resigned and was replaced as premier by Alan Carpenter.

Soon after becoming a minister, MacTiernan had her driver's licence suspended for three months after accumulating too many demerit points. It then emerged that was the third time her licence had been suspended over the previous 15 years, having been caught drink driving two times before. In response, Police Minister Michelle Roberts took over for the road safety aspects of MacTiernan's portfolio by becoming the minister assisting the minister for planning and infrastructure with respect to road safety.

Her most important achievement during this time was overseeing the construction and initial operation of the Mandurah line. The previous Liberal government had been planning for the line to run as a spur off the Armadale line at Kenwick. In July 2001, Cabinet approved the rerouting of the line as a direct route south from the Perth central business district (CBD) along the Kwinana Freeway, requiring the construction of the William Street tunnel. This made the railway more expensive than the previous plan, but resulted in a faster travel time as well as serving new areas. The scheduled opening date was delayed by a year.

In addition to the Mandurah line construction, she oversaw several other public transport projects. The New MetroRail brand was formed for these projects to go under. These projects included the extension of the Joondalup line north to Clarkson station, the construction of a spur off the Armadale line to Thornlie, the building of Greenwood station and the rebuilding of Victoria Park station.

MacTiernan led a restructuring of the government agencies that oversaw public transport. On 1 July 2003, the Public Transport Authority took over all functions relating to public transport in Western Australia from the various agencies that previously performed those functions. This included the planning, construction and management of Transperth services, Transwa services, school bus services and regional public transport.

In April 2002, it was revealed that the state government would be undertaking a $103 million upgrade of Geraldton Port, enabling handymax ships to enter the port. This was completed by October 2003.

MacTiernan was critical of The West Australian newspaper under editor Paul Armstrong, due to its bias against the Labor government, particularly in its opposition to the Mandurah line.

In road transport, she extended Roe Highway from Welshpool Road to the Kwinana Freeway over the course of several stages. She refused to build Roe 8, an extension of the highway west of the Kwinana Freeway through the Beeliar Wetlands, however, due to the environmental impact. She extended Tonkin Highway south from Albany Highway; the $140 million cost making it the single biggest road construction project in Western Australia up to that point. The first stage of the extension, to Armadale Road, opened on 2 April 2005. The second stage of the extension, to Thomas Road, opened on 16 December 2005.

In December 2006, she approved of the awarding of a $511 million contract for the construction of the New Perth Bunbury Highway project. This involved the construction of a 70.5 kilometres (43.8 mi) dual carriageway to bypass Mandurah. Construction started later that month, and the road opened on 20 September 2009, with the northern part being named the Kwinana Freeway and the southern part being named Forrest Highway. Despite not being a minister at the time, she was invited to the opening ceremony to cut the ribbon with Premier Colin Barnett, Senator Chris Evans, Transport Minister Simon O'Brien, and the member for Canning Don Randall.

== Resignation and local government ==
The Labor Party lost the 2008 state election, and so MacTiernan was no longer a minister after that. After Carpenter resigned as the leader of the Labor Party, MacTiernan was one of the frontrunners to replace him. She pulled out of the leadership contest when it became clear she did not have the support of caucus, and so Eric Ripper was elected leader. She became the shadow minister for regional development, strategic infrastructure, and climate change.

By 2009, she was considering entering federal politics by contesting the marginal seat of Canning, held by Randall, at the 2010 federal election. She confirmed her decision to contest in August 2009, and officially nominated for preselection in December 2009. As the only nomination, she was formally endorsed later that month. In March 2010, she stepped down from her shadow cabinet roles, and on 20 July 2010, she resigned from parliament. On 22 August 2010, the day after the election, she conceded defeat. She achieved a 3% swing towards Labor in Canning, despite a 2% swing away from Labor statewide.

In August 2011, MacTiernan stated she would run to be the mayor of Vincent, after incumbent mayor Nick Catania announced he would not recontest the upcoming October 2011 election. She remained a Labor Party member, but ran as an independent, in line with tradition that political parties not endorse candidates in local government elections in Western Australia. In the election, MacTiernan beat her only opponent, Deputy Mayor Sally Lake, 4493 votes to 2660.

== Federal politics ==
After Stephen Smith revealed that he was going to retire as the member for the seat of Perth at the 2013 federal election, MacTiernan announced her intention to contest the seat for the Labor Party. With the only other person to nominate for preselection withdrawing, MacTiernan was endorsed as the party's candidate. She won the seat of Perth with a 1.5% swing against her, with her high-profile likely saving the seat from being won by the Liberal Party. She was succeeded as mayor of Vincent by John Carey in October 2013.

In July 2014 it was reported that a UMR robo-poll of 23 federal electorates, conducted for the National Tertiary Education Union, had found that MacTiernan was the second most popular federal MP, with an approval rating among her own constituents of 51% and a disapproval rating of 21%, for a net rating of +30%.

In 2015, the Labor Party's state branch attempted to block MacTiernan's and Gary Gray's nominations for preselection after they refused to sign a "candidate's pledge" which would make them follow the policies and platform of the state branch and force them to obey state secretary Patrick Gorman. The national executive intervened to allow their nominations. MacTiernan announced in February 2016 that she would not be contesting her seat at the 2016 federal election. She later said it was the factional system which prevented her rise into the ministry that prompted her to quit federal politics. She had been an unaligned MP. Amid speculation that she would attempt to challenge Mark McGowan to become leader of the Labor Party in Western Australia, she denied she was going to do that, but did not rule out returning to state politics.

== Return to State politics ==
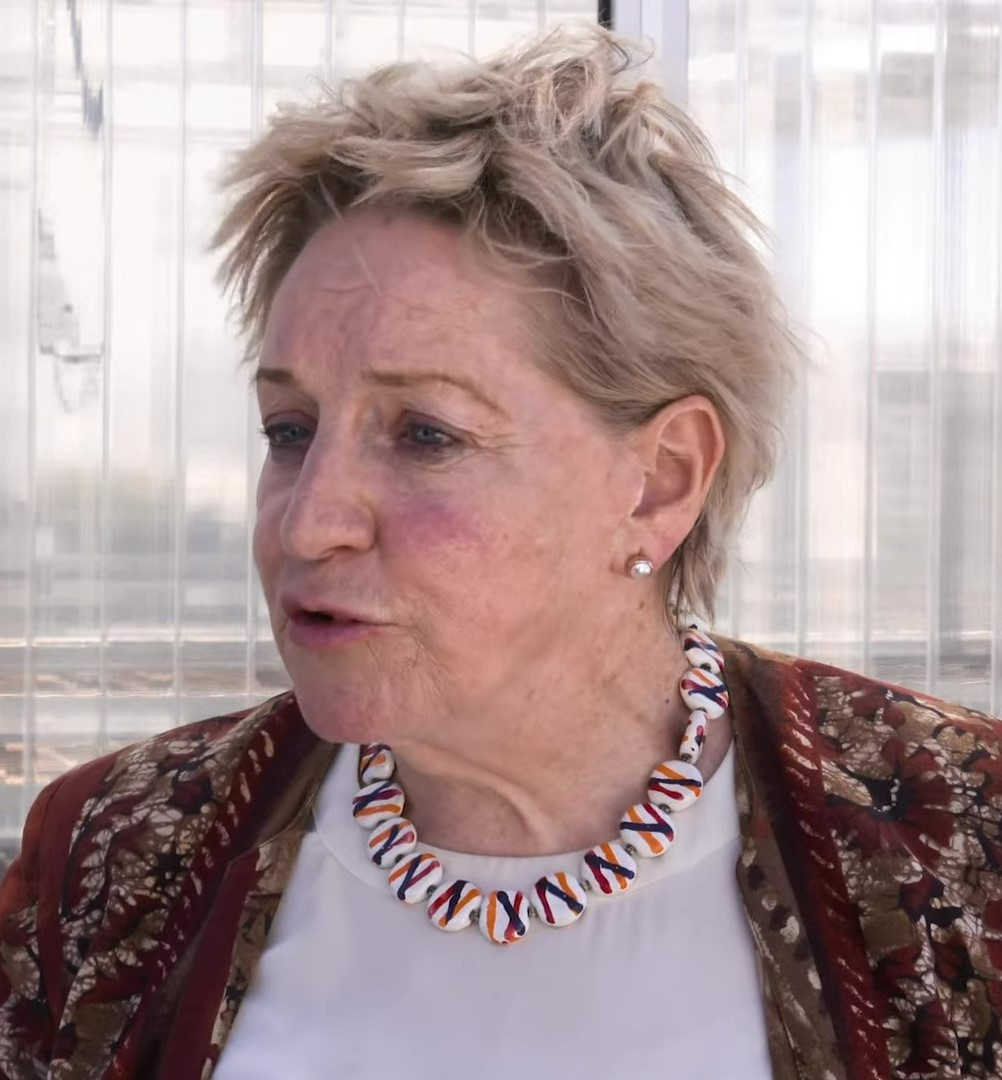
Alannah MacTiernan in December 2020

After Ken Travers resigned from the Legislative Council in August 2016, McGowan announced MacTiernan as his preferred choice as the first candidate on the Labor Party's ticket for the North Metropolitan Region at the March 2017 state election. In the meantime, Laine McDonald replaced Travers as she was the next candidate on Labor's North Metropolitan ticket. With McGowan's support, her preselection was practically guaranteed. On 17 March 2017, six days after the election, MacTiernan was sworn in as the minister for regional development and the minister for agriculture and food. She was also the minister assisting the minister for state development, jobs and trade. Her term on the Legislative Council started on 22 May 2017. From 13 December 2018, she was also the minister for ports, a role that was previously performed by Transport Minister Rita Saffioti.

Ahead of the 2021 state election, MacTiernan replaced Adele Farina as the second candidate on the Labor Party's ticket for the South West Region. The decision was made by the party's Administrative Committee without a ballot by rank-and-file members. According to Farina, the decision was due to a factional deal which meant the Left's Pierre Yang was moved up from third candidate in the South Metropolitan Region to MacTiernan's spot as first candidate in the North Metropolitan Region. In 2020, she stated that the next term would be her last term in parliament. On 19 March 2021, after the election six days earlier, MacTiernan relinquished the role of minister for ports to Saffioti, but gained the new role of minister for hydrogen industry. Speaking after being sworn in, she said the wanted to make Western Australia "the vanguard" of the hydrogen boom by exporting it by 2024 and using hydrogen to replace diesel on mine sites and other areas across the state.

In July 2022, MacTiernan attracted controversy due to her comments in response to the 2022 Indonesian foot-and-mouth disease outbreak. She said:

I would not say it would be catastrophic. It would be costly and very unfortunate. But even if it does happen, we can move beyond it. It’s not going to stop milk or meat being available to us. And some people might argue it might actually make it cheaper because there’ll be more of it available domestically.

These comments were criticised by Liberal and National politicians and farming groups. Federal Liberal MP Rick Wilson said that she should be sacked, saying "for a so-called minister for agriculture, to treat this issue in such a cavalier and careless manner indicates she is not fit in any way, shape or form to hold her current position". State shadow agriculture minister and Nationals MLA Colin de Grussa said the comments were a "slap in the face" and showed "disdain" for farmers. Federal Nationals leader David Littleproud said "Alannah MacTiernan’s comments are the most abhorrent I’ve heard from an Australian agriculture minister". Pastoralists and Graziers Association president Tony Seabrook, WA Farmers Federation chief executive Trevor Whittington, and WA Farmers president John Hassell also criticised the comments, although Seabrook held back from calling for her to resign as he thought there was no other suitable Labor MP. Premier McGowan said MacTiernan "went a bit far and made a mistake", but continued to back her. MacTiernan apologised, Days later, she confirmed her intention to retire at the 2025 state election, but continue in the ministry until then.

MacTiernan was one of six Labor MP's elected in 2021 that was not factionally aligned.

On 7 November 2022, she announced her intention to resign from cabinet by the end of the year and resign from parliament in early 2023. She resigned as a minister on 14 December 2022. She was succeeded by Don Punch as the minister for regional development, cabinet newcomer Jackie Jarvis as the minister for agriculture and food, and Roger Cook as the minister for hydrogen industry. She resigned from parliament on 10 February 2023. She was replaced on 20 March 2023 by Narrogin lawyer Ben Dawkins. He was fifth on Labor's South West Region ticket but got the position because the fourth-placed candidate, Bunbury sign-writer John Mondy, said he will not take the position in parliament due to being preoccupied with his business. Dawkins is suspended from the Labor Party for being charged with 43 counts of breaching a family violence restraining order.

== Personal life ==
MacTiernan grew up Catholic, but has since become an atheist. She has one son and one daughter with her husband.

In 2019, MacTiernan was diagnosed with breast cancer, and underwent surgery and chemotherapy. She was declared cancer-free in May 2020.

== See also ==
- Electoral results for the district of Armadale
- Electoral results for the Division of Perth

Parliament of Australia
Preceded by Stephen Smith	Member for Perth; 7 September 2013 – 9 May 2016	Succeeded by Tim Hammond
Parliament of Western Australia
Preceded by Kay Hallahan	Member for East Metropolitan Region; 22 May 1993 – 21 November 1996; Served alongside: Tom Butler, Nick Griffiths, Peter Foss, Derrick Tomlinson, Valma Ferguson	Succeeded by Paul Sulc
Preceded by Kay Hallahan	Member for Armadale; 14 December 1996 – 20 July 2010	Succeeded by Tony Buti
Preceded by Laine McDonald	Member for North Metropolitan Region; 22 May 2017 – 22 May 2021; With: Peter Collier, Martin Pritchard, Michael Mischin, Alison Xamon, Tjorn Sibma	Succeeded by Pierre Yang
Preceded by Adele Farina	Member for South West Region; 22 May 2021 – 10 February 2023; With: Sally Talbot, Steve Thomas, Jackie Jarvis, Sophia Moermond, James Hayward	Succeeded by Ben Dawkins
Political offices
Preceded by Graham Kierath as the Minister for Planning; Murray Criddle as the Minister for Transport	Minister for Planning and Infrastructure; 16 February 2001 – 23 September 2008	Succeeded by John Day as the Minister for Planning; Simon O'Brien as the Minister for Transport
Preceded by Terry Redman	Minister for Regional Development; 17 March 2017 – 14 December 2022	Succeeded by Don Punch
Preceded by Mark Lewis	Minister for Agriculture and Food; 17 March 2017 – 14 December 2022	Succeeded by Jackie Jarvis
New title	Minister for Ports; 13 December 2018 – 19 March 2021	Succeeded by Rita Saffioti
New title	Minister for Hydrogen Industry; 19 March 2021 – 14 December 2022	Succeeded by Roger Cook
Civic offices
Preceded by Nick Catania	Mayor of Vincent; 2011–2013	Succeeded by John Carey
