= Kate Doust =

Australian politician

The Honourable Kate Doust MLC
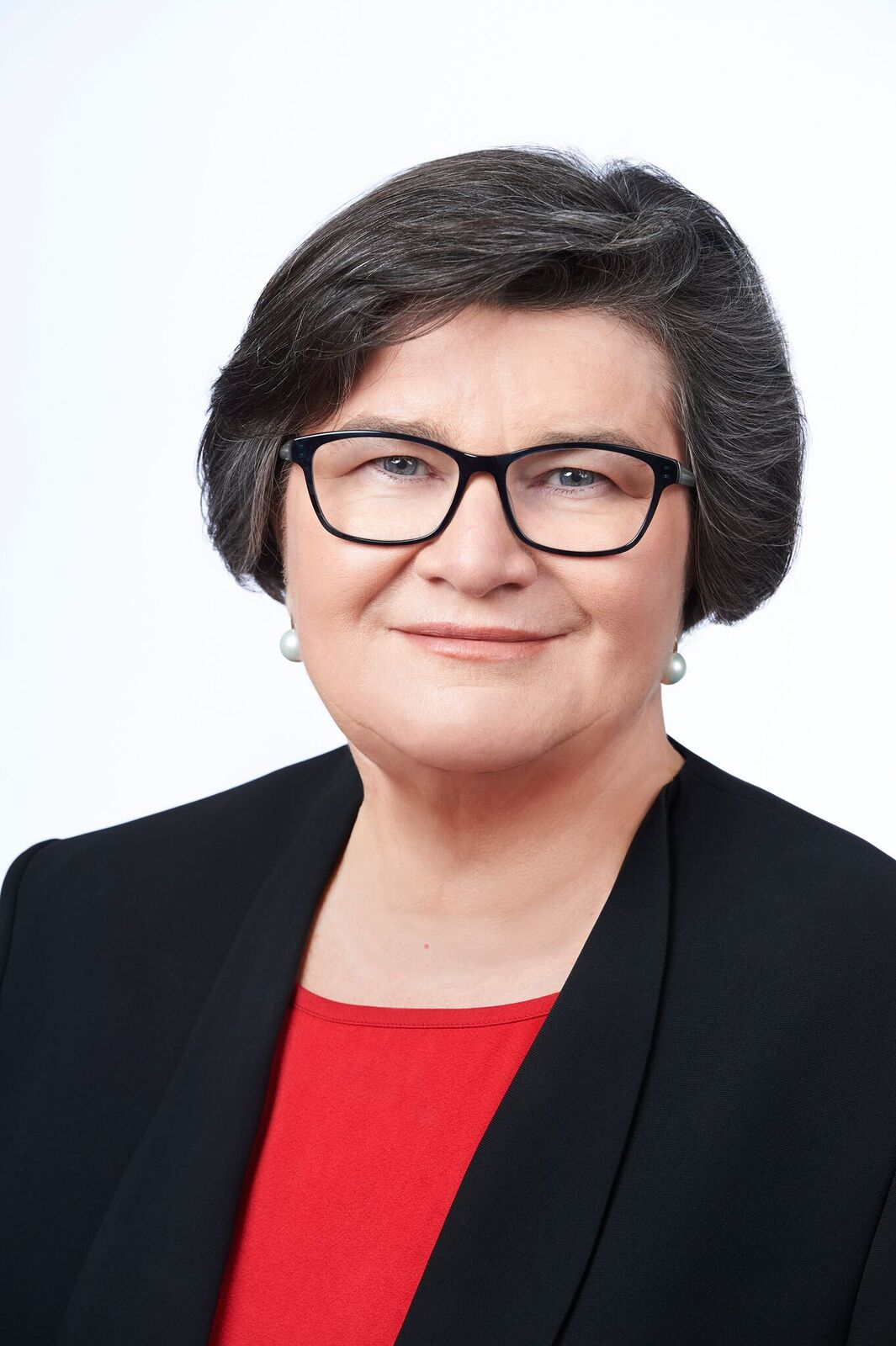

18th President of the Legislative Council of Western Australia
- In office 23 May 2017 – 24 May 2021
- Preceded by: Barry House
- Succeeded by: Alanna Clohesy

Member of the Legislative Council of Western Australia
- Incumbent
- Assumed office 22 May 2001 Serving with Edman, Ellery, Goiran, MacLaren, Mills, O'Brien, B. Scott, J. Scott
- Constituency: South Metropolitan Region

Personal details
- Born: 27 May 1962 (age 64) Kalgoorlie, Western Australia
- Party: Labor
- Spouse: Bill Johnston
- Education: University of Western Australia

Catherine Esther Doust (born 27 May 1962) is an Australian politician who has been a Labor Party member of the Legislative Council of Western Australia since 2001, representing South Metropolitan Region. She was President of the Legislative Council from 2017 to 2021, the first woman to hold the position.

== Early life ==
Doust was born in Kalgoorlie and attended the University of Western Australia, graduating with a Bachelor of Arts degree. From 1984, she worked as an official with the Shop, Distributive and Allied Employees Association, including as a board member and treasurer for periods. She also served as a vice-president of UnionsWA.

== Political career ==
Doust entered parliament at the 2001 state election, standing in the second position on Labor's ticket in South Metropolitan Region. She was made deputy chairman of committees in the Legislative Council shortly after being elected, and after the 2005 state election was made a parliamentary secretary, holding that position in the ministries of Geoff Gallop and Alan Carpenter. Doust was elected deputy leader of the Labor Party in the Legislative Council after the 2008 state election. She has served in the shadow cabinet under both Eric Ripper and Mark McGowan. Doust's husband, Bill Johnston, is also a member of parliament, although they were married years before either of them were elected.

Doust was elected President of the Legislative Council on 23 May 2017, in doing so becoming the first female President of the Council in history. Doust was controversially replaced on 24 May 2021 due to long standing disagreements with Premier Mark McGowan particularly regarding a corruption probe into former Liberal MP Phil Edman.

== Political views ==
Doust describes herself as "very pro-life." She opposed a 2023 bill that liberalised Western Australia's abortion laws by removing abortion from the criminal code, removing a requirement for mandatory counselling, removing the need for women to be referred for an abortion by a doctor, and increasing the gestational limit at which additional restrictions apply to abortions from 20 weeks to 23 weeks. Doust was the only Labor member of the Legislative Council to vote against the bill.

See also

- Women in the Western Australian Legislative Council

== Awards and honours ==
Awarded the inaugural Commonwealth Parliamentary Association (CPA), Parliamentarian of the Year award in 2022.

Master of Bioethics (M. Bioethics) from the University of Notre Dame Australia.

Western Australian Legislative Council
Preceded by Cheryl Davenport	Member for South Metropolitan Region; 2001-2025	Succeeded by Seat abolished
Preceded by New seat	Member of Western Australian Legislative Council; 2025–present	Incumbent
Preceded by Barry House	President of the Western Australian Legislative Council; 2017–2021	Succeeded by Alanna Clohesy
