= Derrick Tomlinson =

Australian politician

Derrick Gordon Tomlinson (born 31 January 1941) is a former Australian politician.

Tomlinson was born at Subiaco and was a university lecturer before entering politics.

== Career ==
He was elected to the Western Australian Legislative Council for East Metropolitan Region in 1989 for the Liberal Party. In 1990 he was appointed Shadow Minister for Justice, moving to Housing in May 1992. In June 1993 he became Deputy Chairman of Committees, serving until early 2001 when he returned to the front bench as Shadow Minister for Community Services and Indigenous Affairs. He retired from politics in 2005.
