= Bill Leadbetter =

Australian politician and historian

Member of the Western Australian Legislative Council for East Metropolitan
- In office 4 April 2017 – 21 May 2017
- Preceded by: Amber-Jade Sanderson

Personal details
- Born: 1957 or 1958 (age 67–68) Sydney, New South Wales
- Party: Labor
- Occupation: Historian

William Lewis Leadbetter is an Australian politician and historian. He was a Labor member of the Western Australian Legislative Council for East Metropolitan from 4 April 2017, when he was elected in a countback following the resignation of Amber-Jade Sanderson, and his term concluded on 21 May 2017, when the new Legislative Council elected at the 2017 state election took its seats. Leadbetter did not seek re-election.

Leadbetter was born in Sydney, and has been a university lecturer in history in Western Australia since 1998. He previously contested the federal seats of Pearce in 2010 and Hasluck in 2016.
