= Shelley Eaton =

Australian politician

Shelley Elizabeth Eaton (born 11 January 1965) is an Australian politician. She was a Labor Party member of the Western Australian Legislative Council from September 2008 until May 2009, representing the Mining and Pastoral Region.

She was born in Subiaco, Western Australia. On 17 September 2008, she was elected to the Legislative Council in a countback for the Mining and Pastoral Region resulting from Vince Catania's resignation to contest a Legislative Assembly seat at the 2008 state election. Her term expired on 21 May 2009.

Eaton had earlier worked as an electorate officer for Tom Stephens and Ljiljanna Ravlich, and relocated from Perth to Broome in 2000.
