= Peter Foss =

Australian politician

- In office 22 May 1989 – 21 May 2005
- Constituency: East Metropolitan Region

Personal details
- Born: 24 March 1946 (age 80) Weston-super-Mare, Somerset, England
- Party: Liberal Party

Peter Gilbert da Conceição Foss KC (born 24 March 1946 in England) is a former Australian politician, who represented the Liberal Party.

Elected to parliament in the 1989 state election, he was a member of the Western Australian Legislative Council representing the East Metropolitan Region, he was re-elected in 1993, 1996, and 2001. He retired in 2005.

During his time in parliament he served as:

- Minister for Health; Consumer Affairs: 16 February 1993 – 10 February 1995
- Minister for the Arts: 16 February 1993 – 22 December 1999
- Minister for Fair Trading: 3 November 1993 – 21 December 1995
- Minister for Water Resources: 10 February 1995 – 21 December 1995
- Minister for the Environment: 10 February 1995 – 9 January 1997
- Attorney General; Minister for Justice: 21 December 1995 – 16 February 2001

He worked as a barrister and solicitor before entering parliament. He was appointed Queen's Counsel while serving as Attorney-General of Western Australia.

== Anti-LGBT amendments ==
Foss was instrumental in creating what has been referred to as Western Australia's "gay propaganda laws". Foss said he would give the support needed to pass a 1989 bill to decriminalise homosexuality, though only if his amendments, later widely referred to as the "Foss Amendments", were included. These included a formal statement from parliament saying it "disapproved of sexual relations between persons of the same sex", and making it a crime to "promote or encourage homosexual behaviour" in schools or for "public purpose". Impacts of the amendments included the banning of a safe sex education campaign in schools, and the removal of police advertisements to recruit openly LGBT people, over concerns about the legality of advertising public service employment to LGBT people. The ambiguity of what constituted promotion or encouragement of homosexuality caused many issues, such as concern from school teachers regarding how they could offer mental-health support to LGBT youth without breaking the law. The Foss Amendments were abolished in 2001.

== Minister for Health ==
Traditionally, Liberal governments supported the tobacco industry against activist moves to restrict smoking (especially in the workplace) but in WA, the Liberal Health Minister Peter Foss took a hard line against smoking. At a joint meeting of the state Health Ministers acting as a Ministerial Council on Drug Strategy (MCDS) he led the move to have prominent health warnings on every pack with a "Quit" phone number included. This was considered by the industry to be a major threat.

In December 1994 he openly attacked the Tobacco Institute of Australia and its CEO Donna Staunton, saying "the people who sell tobacco can only be described as international drug pushers." This caused much consternation in the party across Australia since the massive donations made to the party in other states were a major source of campaign funding. The tobacco taxes collected supposedly to support a "Quit" campaign had been systematically syphoned off for other budget items.

In November 1994 the Western Australian Health Department announced that it would review the Western Australian Tobacco Control Act which was aimed at restricting sponsorship of sporting events by tobacco companies. Foss's lead in these efforts was a reason for industry concern around the world because this established a priority that others might follow.

Foss refused to back down saying: "The bill that we have for smoking related diseases is just enormous. And we certainly don't get back in tobacco taxes anything like the sort of money that we spend on hospitals which have an extra load because of the premature illness caused by tobacco." He wanted warnings to cover the entire side of cigarette packets, and he led the other state Health Ministers in an attempt to get uniform generic packet legislation.
