= Donna Faragher =

Australian politician

The Honourable Donna Faragher MLC
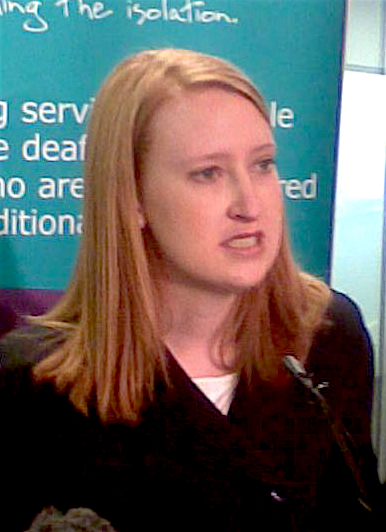
- Faragher in 2008

Member of the Legislative Council of Western Australia
- Incumbent
- Assumed office 22 May 2005
- Constituency: East Metropolitan Region

Personal details
- Born: Donna Evelyn Mary Taylor; 12 September 1975 (age 51) Middle Swan, Western Australia
- Party: Liberal
- Education: University of Western Australia

Donna Evelyn Mary Faragher (née Taylor; born 12 September 1975) is an Australian politician who has been a Liberal Party member of the Legislative Council of Western Australia since 2005, representing East Metropolitan Region. She became a minister in the government of Colin Barnett in 2008, becoming the youngest woman to hold ministerial office in Western Australia.

== Early life ==
Faragher was born in Perth to Joan Betty Light and Donald Franklin Taylor, both of whom were police officers. She attended primary school at Guildford Grammar School and secondary school at Perth College. Faragher then went on to the University of Western Australia, graduating with an initial Bachelor of Arts degree and later completing a Master of Education. She was federal secretary of the Australian Liberal Students' Federation in 1997.

== Politics ==
Prior to entering parliament, Faragher worked as a policy advisor for Senator Chris Ellison, a federal government minister under John Howard. She was elected to the Legislative Council at the 2005 state election, running second behind Helen Morton on the Liberal Party's ticket in East Metropolitan Region. Aged 29 at the time of her election, she became the youngest female MP for the Liberal Party (and the second-youngest overall, after Bill Grayden), as well as the second-youngest woman ever elected to the Legislative Council (after the Labor Party's Louise Pratt).

Shortly after her election, Faragher was added to the Liberal shadow ministry. She would serve under four leaders of the opposition (Matt Birney, Paul Omodei, Troy Buswell, and Colin Barnett. When the Liberal Party won victory at the 2008 state election, she was made Minister for the Environment and Minister for Youth in the new ministry formed by Colin Barnett. Aged 33, she became the youngest woman to serve as a government minister in Western Australia, and the fourth-youngest overall. In November 2010, Faragher resigned from the ministry in order to give birth to her first child. She was instead made parliamentary secretary to the premier, and held that position until March 2016, when she re-entered the ministry as Minister for Planning and Minister for Disability Services.

In January 2024, Faragher revealed she would be retiring from politics at the 2025 state election.

== See also ==
- Women in the Western Australian Legislative Council

Parliament of Western Australia
Political offices
Preceded by David Templeman	Minister for the Environment; 2008–2010	Succeeded by John Day
Preceded by Ljiljanna Ravlich	Minister for Youth; 2008–2010	Succeeded by John Day
Preceded by John Day	Minister for Planning; 2016–2017	Succeeded by Rita Saffioti
Preceded by Helen Morton	Minister for Disability Services; 2016–2017	Succeeded by Stephen Dawson
