= Norm Kelly (Australian politician) =

Australian politician (born 1959)

Norman John Patrick Kelly (born 6 January 1959) is a former Australian politician. Born in Darlinghurst, New South Wales, he was a photographer before entering politics. In 1982, he moved to Western Australia. In 1996, he was elected to the Western Australian Legislative Council for East Metropolitan region as a member of the Australian Democrats; his term began in 1997. Whilst in Parliament, Kelly was a supporter of voluntary euthanasia. He was defeated in 2001. After leaving politics, Kelly completed a BA degree in politics and sociology with Curtin University in 2003, a BSocSc degree with First Class Honours with Curtin University in 2004, and a PhD with Australian National University in 2009.
