= Paul Sulc =

Australian politician

Member of the Western Australian Legislative Council for East Metropolitan
- In office 24 December 1996 – 21 May 1997
- Preceded by: Alannah MacTiernan

Personal details
- Born: 1 February 1967 (age 59) Perth, Western Australia
- Party: Labor Party
- Occupation: Refrigeration fitter

Paul Sulc (born 1 February 1967) is an Australian politician. He was a Labor Party member of the Western Australian Legislative Council from December 1996 to May 1997, representing East Metropolitan Region.

Born in Perth, Western Australia, Sulc was a refrigeration fitter before entering politics. He was an unsuccessful candidate for the Legislative Council at the 1993 state election, but was elected on a countback following the resignation of Alannah MacTiernan to contest a seat in the Legislative Assembly at the 1996 state election. Sulc was an unsuccessful candidate at the 1996 election; as such, his term expired with the Legislative Council on 21 May 1997.
