= Matthew Swinbourn =

Australian politician

The Honourable Matthew Swinbourn MLC
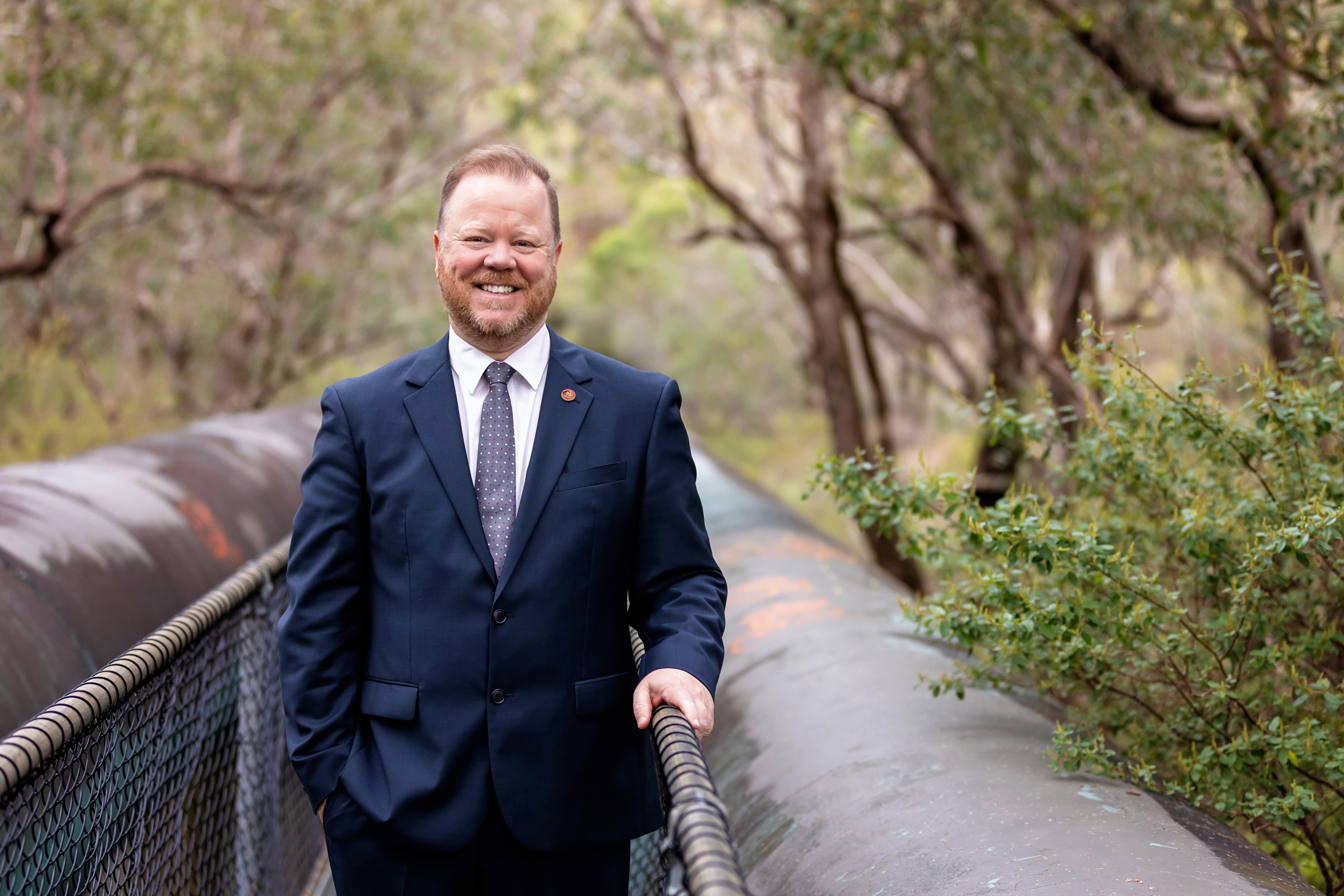
- Matthew Swinbourn at Serpentine National Park

Minister for Environment; Community Services; Homelessness
- Incumbent
- Assumed office 19 March 2025

Member of the Western Australian Legislative Council
- Incumbent
- Assumed office 22 May 2017

Personal details
- Born: 3 April 1975 (age 51) Middle Swan, Western Australia
- Party: Labor
- Education: University of Western Australia
- Profession: Lawyer

Matthew Dean Swinbourn (born 3 April 1975) is an Australian politician. He was educated at Kent Street Senior High School.

He was elected to the Western Australian Legislative Council at the 2017 state election, as a Labor member for the East Metropolitan Region. His term began on 22 May 2017.

Following the 2021 Western Australian state election, Swinbourn was appointed as Parliamentary Secretary to the Attorney-General and Minister for Electoral Affairs, John Quigley.

Before entering politics, Swinbourn worked at several trade unions. In 2002, he was employed by the Liquor, Hospitality and Miscellaneous Union as a workers' compensation officer. He took a position at the Construction, Forestry, Mining and Energy Union as an industrial officer in 2007 for three years, before taking a position at the Health Services Union. Swinbourn returned to the CFMEU in 2012, where he worked as a lawyer until his election.
