= Alanna Clohesy =

Australian politician

The Honourable Alanna Clohesy MLC
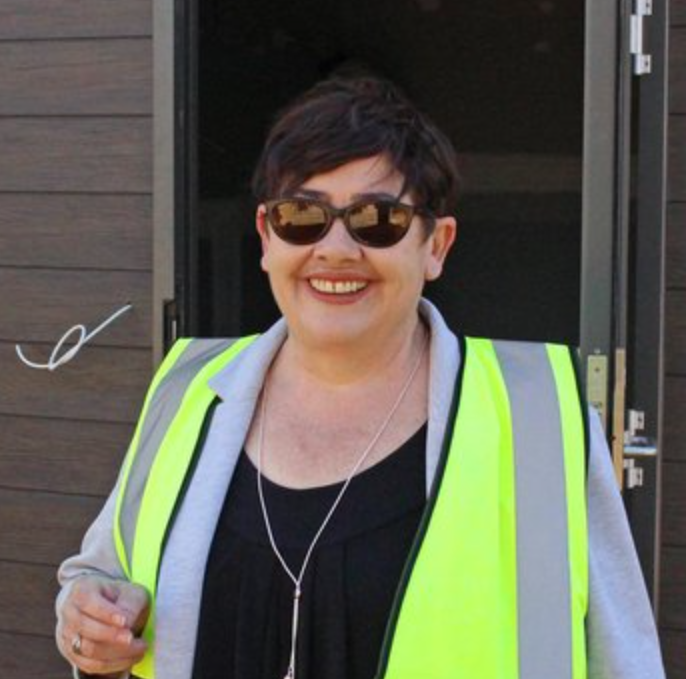

19th President of the Western Australian Legislative Council
- Incumbent
- Assumed office 25 May 2021
- Preceded by: Kate Doust

Member of the Western Australian Legislative Council for East Metropolitan
- Incumbent
- Assumed office 22 May 2013

Personal details
- Born: 21 August 1962 (age 63) Sea Lake, Victoria, Australia
- Party: Labor

Alanna Therese Clohesy (born 21 August 1962) is an Australian politician who is the 19th and current President of the Western Australian Legislative Council. She was elected to the Western Australian Legislative Council as a Labor Party member for the East Metropolitan region at the 2013 state election.

Immediately following her election to the Council, Clohesy was appointed Deputy Chair of Committees. In 2017, she became Parliamentary Secretary to the Deputy Premier and Minister for Health and Mental Health, Roger Cook, in the First McGowan Ministry, before being elected to the Presidency in 2021.

Prior to entering the Legislative Council, Clohesy had an extensive career in social policy, service delivery and advocacy, culminating in her appointment as Deputy Director of People with Disability Australia.

== Early life ==
Alanna Clohesy was born in Sea Lake, Victoria on 21 August 1962. She was one of six children raised solely by her mother before the social reforms of the Whitlam Government, a situation that greatly influenced her worldview.

== Career ==
As Chairperson for NSW International Youth Year and Committee Member for the Youth Affairs Council of Australia, Clohesy focused on social and youth policy development. In 1988 she was appointed Executive Officer of the Brain Injury Association of New South Wales (formerly Headway NSW) and then, after a stint in the tourism sector she returned to advocacy work as Manager of Policy and Advocacy with People with Disabilities (NSW) in 1991.

She has travelled extensively within Australia, living in several major capital cities. She spent time in Adelaide where she worked as a social policy consultant while undertaking tertiary education and was a lecturer in the School of International, Community and Cultural Studies at Edith Cowan University while undertaking postgraduate studies. Her subjects included public policy in women’s health, welfare policy and feminist theory. In 2003, she returned to People with Disability Australia Incorporated and was appointed Deputy Director with responsibility for Human Rights and Advocacy in 2004, working particularly on the development of the United Nations Convention on the Rights of Persons with Disabilities.

== Politics ==
Clohesy has been a member of the Australian Labor Party since 1984.

Prior to her election to the Legislative Council took an active role in both the organisational development of the party and party policy formulation. She was elected President of the WA Labor Branch in 2010 and re-elected in 2012. She held this role until 2014. She was elected to the Legislative Council of Western Australia in 2013 and was re-elected at the 2017 state election.

In 2017, she was appointed Parliamentary Secretary to the Deputy Premier; Minister for Health and Mental Health, in the newly elected State Labor Government led by Mark McGowan.

On 25 May 2021, the day after the swearing-in of MLCs elected at the 2021 state election, Clohesy was elected to serve as the 19th President of the Western Australian Legislative Council.

Western Australian Legislative Council
Preceded by Ljiljanna Ravlich	Member for East Metropolitan Region; 2013-2025	Succeeded by Seat abolished
Preceded by New seat	Member of Western Australian Legislative Council; 2025–present	Incumbent
Preceded by Kate Doust	President of the Western Australian Legislative Council; 2021–present	Incumbent
