= Sheila Mills =

Welsh-born Australian politician

Hon Sheila Mills

Member of the Western Australian Legislative Council
- In office 22 May 2005 – 21 May 2009
- Constituency: South Metropolitan Region

Personal details
- Party: Labor

Sheila Mills (born 27 July 1949) is a Welsh-born Australian former politician. She was a Labor member of the Western Australian Legislative Council representing the South Metropolitan Region from 2005 to 2009.

== Early life and career ==
Mills was born in Connah’s Quay, Wales on 27 July 1949. She migrated to Australia and settled in Western Australia. From 1984 to 2000 she worked as Parliamentary Education and Information Officer for the Parliament of Western Australia.

== Political career ==
Mills was elected to the Legislative Council at the 2005 state election. She served one term until 2009. In her inaugural speech she spoke on issues of Australian federalism.

== Committees ==
- Standing Committee on Uniform Legislation and General Purposes: 26 May 2005 – 17 August 2005
- Standing Committee on Uniform Legislation and Statutes Review: 17 August 2005 – 21 May 2009
- Parliamentary Services Committee: 17 August 2005 – 21 May 2009
- Member, Parliamentary Services Committee: 17 August 2005 – 21 May 2009
