= Barbara Scott (Australian politician) =

Australian politician (born 1939)

Barbara Scott OAM

Member of the Western Australian Legislative Council
- In office 22 May 1993 – 22 May 2009
- Constituency: South Metropolitan Region

Personal details
- Born: 21 July 1939 (age 87) Merredin, Western Australia
- Party: Liberal Party
- Profession: Teacher

Barbara Mary Scott OAM (née Barnett; born 21 July 1939) is a former Australian politician. She was a member of the Western Australian Legislative Council representing the South Metropolitan Region from 1993 to 2009. Elected to Parliament in the 1993 state election and subsequently re-elected in the 1996, 2001 and 2005 state elections, she served as a member of the Liberal Party.

Scott grew up in the wheatbelt town of Walgoolan and after completing her teaching qualification she returned to the country as a teacher.

After entering parliament Scott acted as the shadow minister for Culture and the Arts (March 2005 to April 2006), shadow minister for Censorship and Children (March 2005 to present) and shadow minister for the Arts (April 2006 to present).

In February 2008 Scott announced that she would retire from politics at the next state election and would not seek preselection.
