= Jackie Jarvis =

Australian politician

The Honourable Jackie Jarvis MLC

Member of the Western Australian Legislative Council for South West Region
- Incumbent
- Assumed office 22 May 2021

Minister for Agriculture and Food; Forestry; Small Business
- Premier: Mark McGowan

Personal details
- Born: 14 September 1968 (age 57) Bletchley, England
- Party: Labor

Jackie Jarvis (born 14 September 1968) is an Australian politician. Jarvis has served as a Member of the Western Australian Legislative Council as a Labor member for South West since 2021, and as Minister for Agriculture and Food; Forestry; Small Business since late 2022.

Jarvis was born in Bletchley, England to an Irish father and English mother and emigrated to Western Australia in 1970.

Prior to her election, Jarvis held a number of agri-business and regional development roles, and was chief executive of the Rural Regional and Remote Women's Network.

In 2014, she won the WA Rural Women's Award and was the runner-up in the national awards.

In 2019, she was named the Rural Community Leader of the Year at the Farmer of the Year Awards.

== Policy positions ==
As Western Australia’s Minister for Agriculture, Jackie Jarvis supported a nationally agreed plan to phase out battery cages for egg-laying hens by 2036 and later stated that she intended to accelerate the transition in Western Australia by four years.

== Personal life ==
Jarvis lives in Margaret River, where she owns a commercial farm and winery business jarvis estate with her husband, Matt.
