= Linda Savage =

Australian politician

The Honourable Linda Savage MLC

Member of the Legislative Council of Western Australia
- In office 22 March 2010 – 21 May 2013
- Constituency: East Metropolitan

Personal details
- Born: 14 January 1957 (age 69) Perth, Western Australia, Australia
- Party: Labor

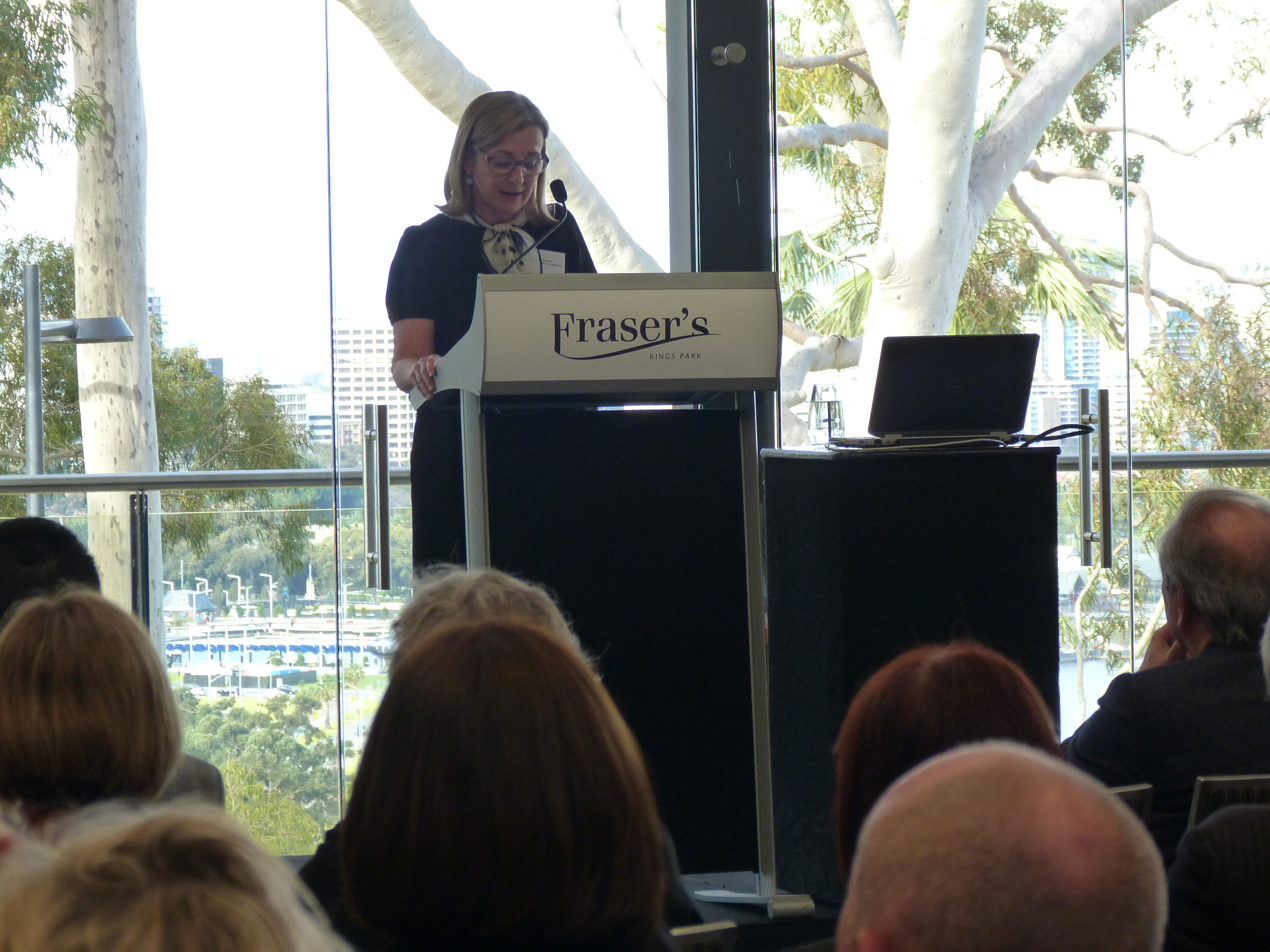
Linda Savage at the launch of the Valuing Children Initiative 10 August 2016

Linda Rosemary Savage is a lawyer and former Australian politician. She was third on the Labor Party ticket for the Legislative Council region of East Metropolitan at the 2008 Western Australian state election, but was not elected. After the death of Jock Ferguson on 13 February 2010, she was elected in a recount on 22 March. In May 2013, she exited politics after failing to gain pre-selection due to her choice to not join a Labor faction.

Savage is the inaugural convenor of the Valuing Children Initiative.

== Education ==
Savage attended the University of Western Australia where she graduated with a Bachelor of Arts degree with honors in political science in 1980. She later studied at the University of Cambridge and in 1984 graduated with a master's degree in law. She is a graduate of the Australian Institute of Company Directors.

== Career ==
Savage has worked in a legal capacity in a number of positions. She has served as a member of the Social Security Appeals Tribunal and subsequently as its director. In 2003 she was appointed to the Administrative Appeals Tribunal. She has also served on numerous advisory committees and boards. Savage was a founding member of the Women's Legal Service Steering Committee and was the convener of the Management Committee to establish the Women's Legal Service of Western Australia from 1992 to 1996. In 1993 she became a member of the Steering Committee and Taskforce of the then Chief Justice David Malcolm's Taskforce on Gender Bias. During this time she was also appointed to the role of Vice President of the Executive of Women Lawyers Committee of WA. She has been a member of the Reproductive Technology Council of Western Australia, a board member of the Art Gallery of Western Australia and ASeTTS .

From 2010 to 2013 Savage served in the Legislative Council in the Western Australian State Parliament, as the Member for the East Metropolitan region. During this time, she was appointed to the Uniform Legislation and Statute Review Committee and Joint Standing Committee on the Commissioner for Children and Young People and undertook the position of Shadow Parliamentary Secretary for Child Protection; Disability Services; Community Services; Early Childhood and Women's Interests from early 2012. As the spokesperson for Early Childhood, Savage would also write The Health and Happiness of our Children discussion paper for the Western Australian branch of the Labor Party.

She is currently a director on the boards of the Black Swan State Theatre Company, Youth Legal Services and the National Drug Research Institute. Since January 2016, Savage has been the convenor for the Valuing Children Initiative.

== Awards ==
In 1997 Savage received the Law Society of Western Australia's Annual Award for Outstanding Service in the Community. She received the award for Woman Lawyer of the Year from Women Lawyers of WA in 2010.
