= Jock Ferguson (politician) =

Australian politician

MLC for East Metropolitan
- In office 22 May 2009 – 13 February 2010

Personal details
- Born: John Kilday Ferguson; 15 January 1946 Glasgow, Scotland
- Died: 13 February 2010 (aged 64) Perth, Australia
- Party: Australian Labor
- Spouse(s): June (divorced); Ann (Annie) (divorced)
- Relations: 2 children
- Children: 5 children (1 deceased)
- Nickname: "Jock"

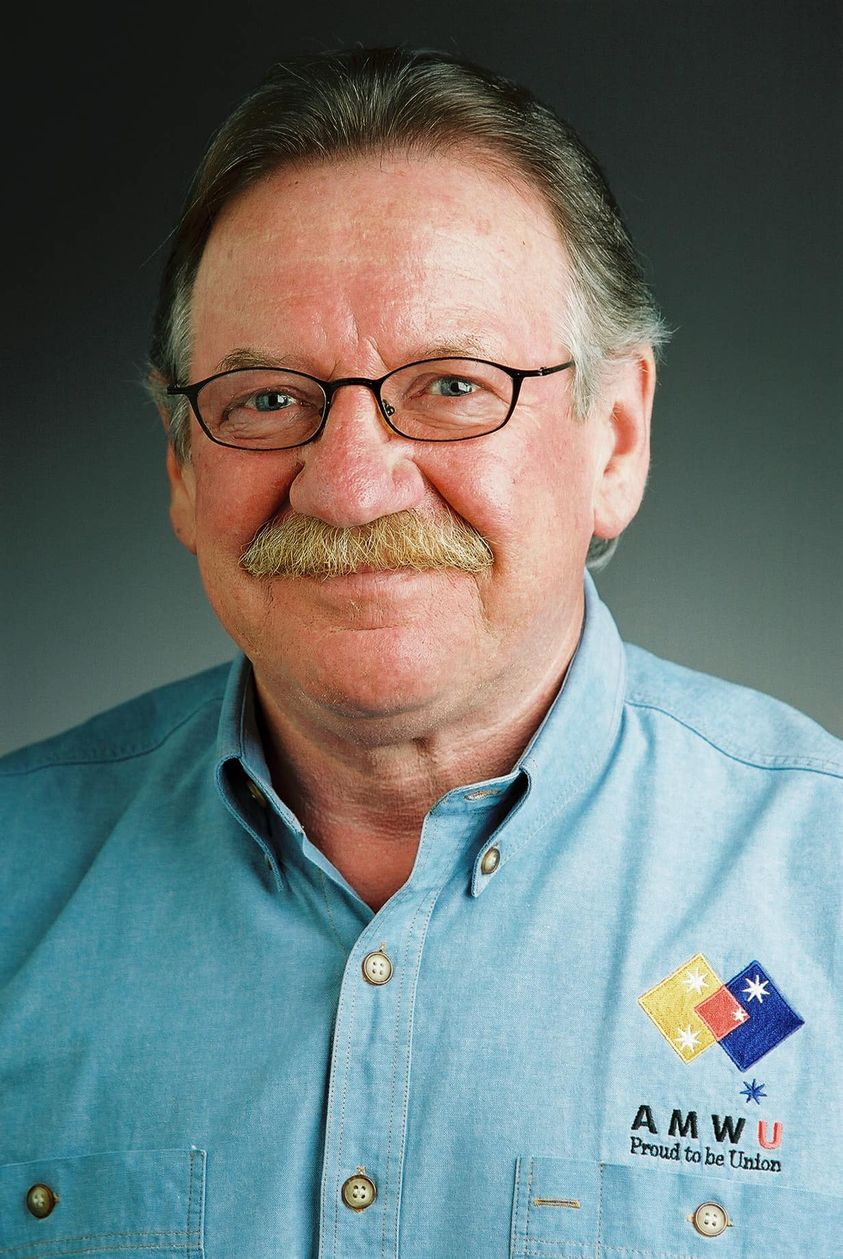
Jock Kilday Ferguson - AMWU State Secretary

John Kilday "Jock" Ferguson (15 January 1946 – 13 February 2010) was a Scottish-born Australian politician. Born in Glasgow, Scotland, Ferguson worked as a fitters apprentice delegate to the Boilermakers Union. He served in the British Merchant Navy before moving to New Zealand. Arrived in Western Australia in 1976 to work as a fitter in the Pilbara and Gascoyne regions. Later Ferguson became a member of the AMWU (Australian Manufacturing Workers Union) and rose to become the union's secretary for Western Australia in 2000. He also held a City and Guilds Trade Certificate (Engineering). In 2008, he was elected to the Western Australian Legislative Council as a Labor Party member, representing East Metropolitan Region. His term commenced on 22 May 2009. Ferguson died after a heart attack at his home on 13 February 2010.

May we all see the day when the unity of the community and the workers become so strong that we see the end of unemployment and poverty in the midst of plenty, and it is replaced by a just and equitable system that ensures a full and happy life to all who render useful service in our society

— Jock Ferguson
