= Valma Ferguson =

Australian politician

Valma Eileen Ferguson, née Tucker (born 20 November 1941) is a former Australian politician.

She was born in Perth to truck driver Robert Henry Tucker and Mavis Irene Higham. After finishing school at Girdlestone High School, she worked for Country Newspapers from 1956 to 1957, for Craft Print from 1957 to 1959, and for the Australasian Society of Engineers from 1959 to 1964. An active member of the Australian Labor Party, she was an electorate officer for Kim Beazley from 1981 to 1990, for Peter Walsh from 1990 to 1993, and for Chris Evans from 1993 to 1995. She was elected to the Western Australian Legislative Council in February 1993 in a countback following Kay Hallahan's resignation; she represented East Metropolitan, but was never sworn in as Hallahan's term was due to end in May. She returned to the Council in April 1995, this time assuming the seat vacated by the resignation of Tom Butler. She did not stand for re-election in 1996 and her term concluded in 1997. Ferguson was awarded the Centenary Medal in 2001.
