= Batong Pham =

Australian politician

Batong Vu Pham (born 18 June 1967) is an Australian politician. He was a Labor Party member of the Western Australian Legislative Council from November 2007 to May 2009. He was elected on a countback when Louise Pratt resigned to run for the Senate, but was defeated for Labor preselection to run for a full term in the 2008 election.

Pham was born in the town of Bà Rịa, South Vietnam, near Long Tân in Phước Tuy province (now in Bà Rịa–Vũng Tàu province of Vietnam). His family fled the Vietnam War when he was a baby, reaching Malaysia, where they gained refugee status, ultimately migrating to Australia in 1969. His family settled in Perth, where he became a strawberry farmer. Pham joined the Labor Party in 1996, and was a protégé of former MP Ted Cunningham. Heavily associated with the New Right faction and seen as a "rising star", he sought preselection for the 2005 state election, but was forced to settle for the unwinnable fourth position in East Metropolitan.

Pham received a second opportunity to enter parliament when, in late 2006, fellow MLC Louise Pratt won preselection for a safe seat in the Australian Senate, as part of a factional deal to allow Pham to contest the countback for her seat in the Legislative Council. However, in June 2007, while still awaiting Pratt's resignation, Pham suffered a massive brain aneurysm, resulting in his near death, lengthy hospitalisation, and confinement to a wheelchair. This caused concerns of a crisis in the near-deadlocked Legislative Council after Pratt's resignation in October, as the opposition would not confirm whether they would grant a 'pair' for the ill Pham. He was nonetheless sworn in on 26 November 2007, but was forced to take an immediate leave of absence, being too ill to attend further sittings. Pham made his inaugural speech to parliament 4½ months later, on 8 April.

Labor preselections for the forthcoming state election, due in late 2008 or early 2009, began in early 2008, and Pham announced an intention to recontest, receiving the strong support of his New Right faction. The faction, whose support was waning, chose to support Pham over veteran MLC and Legislative Council President Nick Griffiths. However, the faction's support was not enough, and on 19 May, Pham lost a preselection vote by six votes to Fiona Henderson, who had been endorsed by Premier Alan Carpenter. The decision sparked an angry response from Pham's allies within the party, including Housing Minister Michelle Roberts and former minister John D'Orazio. It also received strong criticism from members of the state's Ethnic Communities Council and the media. Pham left Parliament in May 2009, when the new Legislative Council was sworn in.
