= East Metropolitan Region =

Electoral region in Perth, Western Australia

Coordinates: 32.06°S 115.98°E

East Metropolitan Region Western Australia—Legislative Council
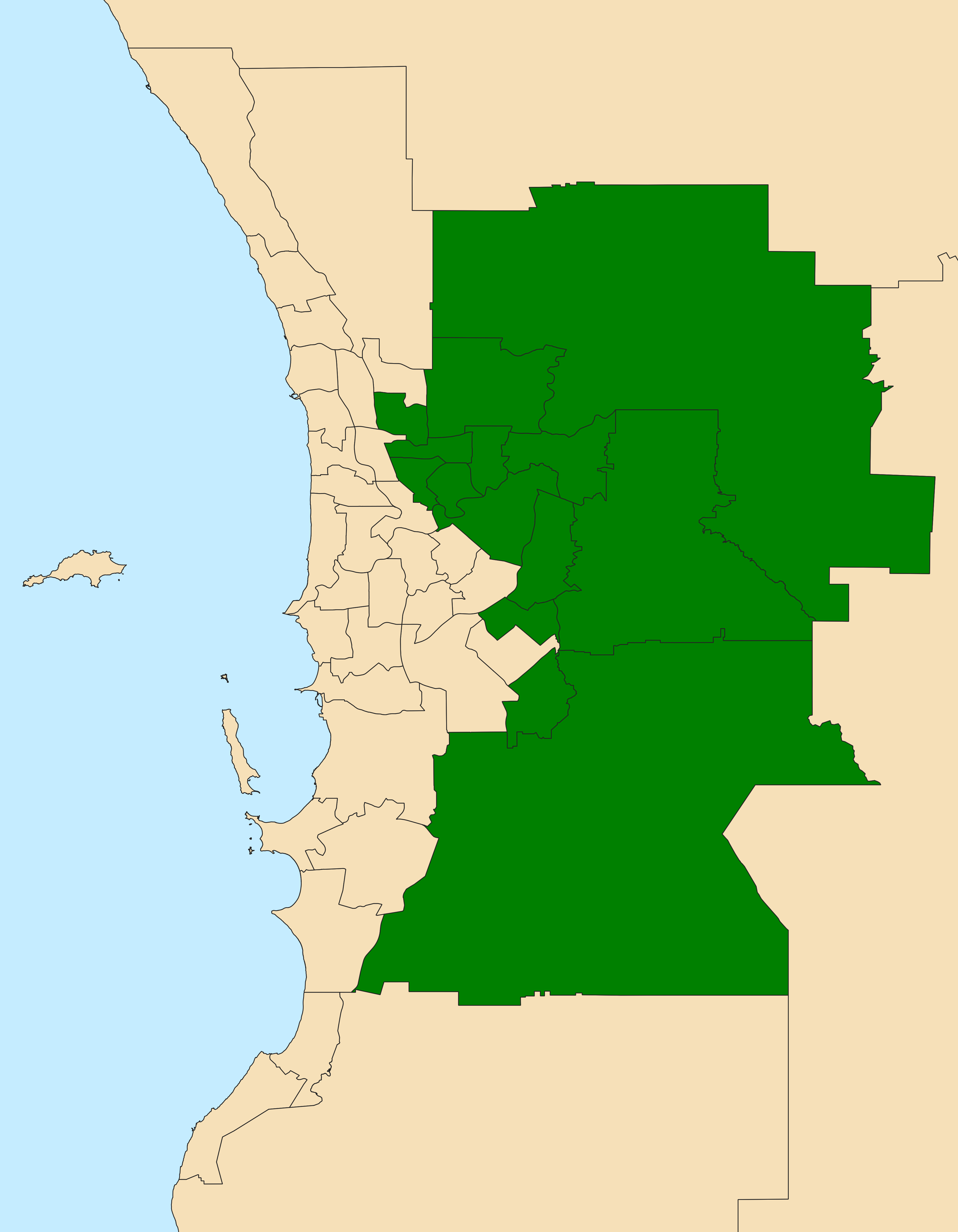
- Location of East Metropolitan Region in the Perth metropolitan area
- State: Western Australia
- Dates current: 1989-2025
- Electors: 423,759 (2021)
- Area: 3,681 km^{2} (1,421.2 sq mi)
- Demographic: Metropolitan

The East Metropolitan Region was a multi-member electoral region of the Western Australian Legislative Council, located in the eastern and south-eastern suburbs of Perth. It was created by the Acts Amendment (Electoral Reform) Act 1987, and became effective on 22 May 1989 with five members who had been elected at the 1989 state election three months earlier. At the 2008 election, it was increased to six members.

The region, along with all other Western Australian Electoral Regions, was abolished in time with the 2025 state election, following legislation passed in November 2021 to create a single, state-wide constituency of 37 members.

== Geography ==
The Region was made up of several complete Legislative Assembly districts, which changed at each distribution.

Redistribution	Period	Electoral districts	Electors	% of state electors	Area
29 April 1988	22 May 1989 – 22 May 1997	Armadale, Belmont, Darling Range, Helena, Kenwick, Maylands, Morley, Roleystone, Swan Hills, Thornlie (10)	195,221	21.47%	3,800 km^{2} (1,500 sq mi)
28 November 1994	22 May 1997 – 22 May 2005	Armadale, Ballajura, Bassendean, Belmont, Darling Range, Midland, Roleystone, Southern River, Swan Hills, Thornlie (10)	227,055	21.96%	3,821 km^{2} (1,475 sq mi)
4 August 2003	22 May 2005 – 22 May 2009	Armadale, Ballajura, Bassendean, Belmont, Darling Range, Midland, Serpentine-Jarrahdale, Southern River, Swan Hills, Thornlie (10)	261,662	21.53%	3,808 km^{2} (1,470 sq mi)
29 October 2007	22 May 2009 – 22 May 2017	Armadale, Bassendean, Belmont, Darling Range, Forrestfield, Gosnells, Kalamunda, Maylands, Midland, Morley, Mount Lawley, Nollamara, Swan Hills, West Swan (14)	311,378	26.07%	3,697 km^{2} (1,427 sq mi)
27 November 2015	22 May 2017 – 22 May 2021	Armadale, Bassendean, Belmont, Darling Range, Forrestfield, Kalamunda, Maylands, Midland, Mirrabooka, Morley, Mount Lawley, Swan Hills, Thornlie, West Swan (14)	395,451	24.82%	3,800 km^{2} (1,500 sq mi)
27 November 2019	22 May 2021 – 22 May 2025	As per 2015	423,759	24.68%	3,681 km^{2} (1,421 sq mi)

== Representation ==
=== Distribution of seats ===
As 5-member seat:
Election	Seats won
1989–1993	
1993–1997	
1997–2001	
2001–2005	
2005–2009	

As 6-member seat:
Election	Seats won
2009–2013	
2013–2017	
2017–2021	
2021–2025	

Legend:
Labor
Liberal
Greens WA
Democrats
One Nation
Legalise Cannabis

=== Members ===
Since its creation, the electorate had 21 members. Two of the members elected in 1989 had previously been members for the North-East Metropolitan Province (Fred McKenzie and Tom Butler) and one had previously been a member for the South-East Metropolitan Province (Kay Hallahan) of the Legislative Council.

Members for East Metropolitan Region
Year	Member	Party	Member	Party	Member	Party	Member	Party	Member	Party	Member	Party
1989	Tom Butler	Labor	Fred McKenzie	Labor	Kay Hallahan	Labor	Peter Foss	Liberal	Derrick Tomlinson	Liberal		
1993	Tom Butler	Labor	Fred McKenzie	Labor	Valma Ferguson	Labor	Peter Foss	Liberal	Derrick Tomlinson	Liberal		
1993	Tom Butler	Labor	Nick Griffiths	Labor	Alannah MacTiernan	Labor	Peter Foss	Liberal	Derrick Tomlinson	Liberal		
1995	Valma Ferguson	Labor	Nick Griffiths	Labor	Alannah MacTiernan	Labor	Peter Foss	Liberal	Derrick Tomlinson	Liberal		
1996	Valma Ferguson	Labor	Nick Griffiths	Labor	Paul Sulc	Labor	Peter Foss	Liberal	Derrick Tomlinson	Liberal		
1996	Ljiljanna Ravlich	Labor	Nick Griffiths	Labor	Norm Kelly	Democrats	Peter Foss	Liberal	Derrick Tomlinson	Liberal		
2001	Ljiljanna Ravlich	Labor	Nick Griffiths	Labor	Louise Pratt	Labor	Peter Foss	Liberal	Derrick Tomlinson	Liberal		
2005	Ljiljanna Ravlich	Labor	Nick Griffiths	Labor	Louise Pratt	Labor	Helen Morton	Liberal	Donna Faragher	Liberal		
2007	Ljiljanna Ravlich	Labor	Nick Griffiths	Labor	Batong Pham	Labor	Helen Morton	Liberal	Donna Faragher	Liberal		
2008	Ljiljanna Ravlich	Labor	Jock Ferguson	Labor	Alison Xamon	Greens	Helen Morton	Liberal	Donna Faragher	Liberal	Alyssa Hayden	Liberal
2010	Ljiljanna Ravlich	Labor	Linda Savage	Labor	Alison Xamon	Greens	Helen Morton	Liberal	Donna Faragher	Liberal	Alyssa Hayden	Liberal
2013	Alanna Clohesy	Labor	Samantha Rowe	Labor	Amber-Jade Sanderson	Labor	Helen Morton	Liberal	Donna Faragher	Liberal	Alyssa Hayden	Liberal
2017	Alanna Clohesy	Labor	Samantha Rowe	Labor	Bill Leadbetter	Labor	Helen Morton	Liberal	Donna Faragher	Liberal	Alyssa Hayden	Liberal
2017	Alanna Clohesy	Labor	Samantha Rowe	Labor	Matthew Swinbourn	Labor	Tim Clifford	Greens	Donna Faragher	Liberal	Charles Smith	One Nation
2019	Alanna Clohesy	Labor	Samantha Rowe	Labor	Matthew Swinbourn	Labor	Tim Clifford	Greens	Donna Faragher	Liberal	Charles Smith	Independent
2020	Alanna Clohesy	Labor	Samantha Rowe	Labor	Matthew Swinbourn	Labor	Tim Clifford	Greens	Donna Faragher	Liberal	Charles Smith	Western Australia
2021	Alanna Clohesy	Labor	Samantha Rowe	Labor	Matthew Swinbourn	Labor	Lorna Harper	Labor	Donna Faragher	Liberal	Brian Walker	Legalise Cannabis

== Election results ==
2021 Western Australian state election: East Metropolitan
Party	Candidate	Votes	%	±%
Quota		50,311		
Labor	1. Alanna Clohesy (elected 1); 2. Samantha Rowe (elected 2); 3. Matthew Swinbourn (elected 3); 4. Lorna Harper (elected 4); 5. Robert Green; 6. John Keogh	232,094	65.90	+19.40
Liberal	1. Donna Faragher (elected 5); 2. Phil Twiss; 3. Greg Halls; 4. Daniel Newman; 5. Jeremy Quinn	48,343	13.73	−11.23
Greens	1. Tim Clifford; 2. Caroline Perks; 3. Callan Gray	21,285	6.04	−2.86
Legalise Cannabis	1. Brian Walker (elected 6); 2. Karl Reinmuth	9,258	2.63	+2.63
Christians	1. Maryka Groenewald; 2. Jamie van Burgel	8,860	2.52	+0.04
One Nation	1. Dale Grillo; 2. Tim Orr	5,122	1.45	−6.57
Shooters, Fishers, Farmers	1. Trevor Ruwoldt; 2. Coby Thomas	4,436	1.26	−0.78
No Mandatory Vaccination	1. Patricia Ayre; 2. Daniel Hall	3,987	1.13	+1.13
Western Australia	1. Charles Smith; 2. James Anthony	2,904	0.82	+0.41
Independent	Peter Lyndon-James	2,738	0.78	+0.78
Animal Justice	1. Amanda Dorn; 2. Nicole Arielli	2,571	0.73	−0.73
Liberal Democrats	1. Craig Buchanan; 2. Neil Hamilton	1,879	0.53	−0.50
Liberals for Climate	1. Marilyn Lottering; 2. R. Smith	1,818	0.52	+0.06
Independent	1. David Larsen; 2. Brian Brightman	1,360	0.39	+0.39
WAxit	1. Satinder Samra; 2. Robin Singh; 3. Monty Singh	1,223	0.35	−0.41
Health Australia	1. Lidia Skorokhod; 2. Lisa Rowe	1,106	0.31	+0.31
Sustainable Australia	1. Nicole Watts; 2. Keith Lethbridge	1,047	0.30	+0.30
Daylight Saving	1. James McManus; 2. Mark Bradley	828	0.24	−0.55
Great Australian	1. Benny Tilbury; 2. Bradley Ward	820	0.23	+0.23
Independent	Hayley Doan	494	0.14	+0.14
Total formal votes		352,173	97.75	+0.66
Informal votes		8,098	2.25	−0.66
Turnout		360,271	85.02	−2.19
