= Lorna Harper =

Western Australian politician

The Honourable Lorna Harper MLC

Member of the Western Australian Legislative Council for East Metropolitan
- In office 22 May 2021 – 2025

Personal details
- Born: June 5, 1969 (age 56) Kilwinning, Scotland
- Party: Labor

Lorna Harper (born 5 June 1969) was elected to the Western Australian Legislative Council as a Labor Party member for East Metropolitan region at the 2021 state election.

She was unseated in the 2025 Western Australian state election.
