= Carolyn Burton =

Australian politician

Carolyn Anne Burton (born 30 March 1955) is an Australian politician. Born in Perth, Western Australia, she was a finance officer before entering politics. On 12 September 2008, she was elected to the Western Australian Legislative Council in a countback after the resignation of Graham Giffard; like Giffard, she is a member of the Labor Party. Her term expired on 21 May 2009.
