= Tom Butler (Australian politician) =

Australian politician

Thomas George Butler (12 September 1929 – 26 May 2006) was an Australian politician.

He was born in Perth to Thomas Charles Butler, a foreman with the Water Authority, and Hilda Vera Cobbe. He attended Victoria Park and St Joachim schools before becoming a painter's apprentice in 1945, trading on his own from 1950. On 27 December 1951 he married Beatrice Coffey at Maylands; they would have five children and later have 13 grandchildren. A member of the Painters and Decorators Union (PDU), he was junior vice-president in 1960, senior vice-president from 1961 to 1962, and a full-time organiser from 1963 to 1971, when he was elected state secretary. Butler continued to be active in the labour movement, serving as state secretary of the PDU until 1983; he was also senior vice-president of the Trades and Labour Council from 1977 to 1982, secretary of the Building Trades Association of Unions from 1972 to 1983, and an active member of the Labor Party, serving as junior vice-president of the state branch from 1973 to 1976, senior vice-president from 1978 to 1979 and president from 1980 to 1990. In 1986 he was elected to the Western Australian Legislative Council for North-East Metropolitan Province. He transferred to East Metropolitan in 1989, and served as a backbencher until his resignation in 1995. Butler died in May 2006.
