= Samantha Rowe =

Australian politician

The Honourable Samantha Rowe MLC
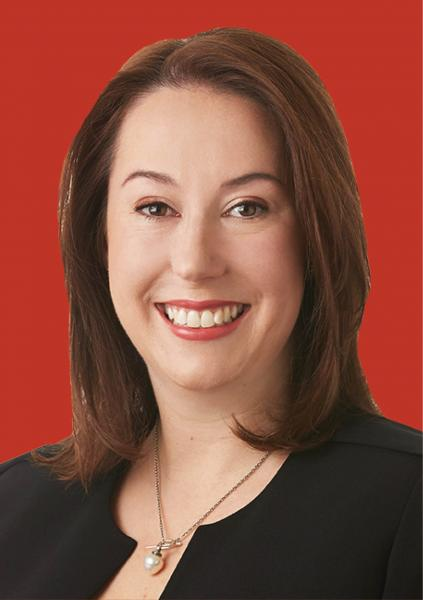
- Rowe in 2016

Member of the Western Australian Legislative Council for East Metropolitan
- Incumbent
- Assumed office 22 May 2013

Personal details
- Born: 30 June 1978 (age 47) Melbourne, Victoria, Australia
- Party: Labor
- Relations: Cassie Rowe (sister)

Samantha Helen Rowe (born 30 June 1978) was elected to the Western Australian Legislative Council as a Labor Party member for East Metropolitan region at the 2013 state election. She took her seat on 22 May 2013.

Prior to her election, Rowe was the executive officer of Labor Business Roundtable.

She is the sister of Cassie Rowe, who was elected to the Western Australian Legislative Assembly in March 2017.
