= Louise Pratt =

Australian politician (born 1972)

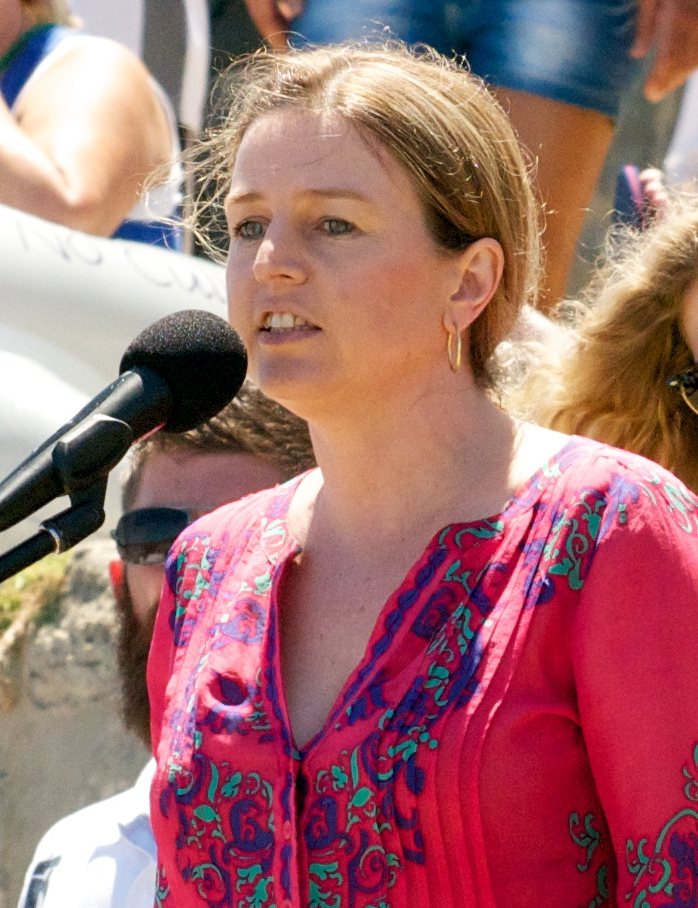
- February 2014

Deputy Government Whip in the Senate
- In office 31 May 2022 – 18 March 2024 Serving with Raff Ciccone
- Preceded by: Anne Urquhart
- Succeeded by: Karen Grogan

Senator for Western Australia
- In office 2 July 2016 – 30 June 2025
- Succeeded by: Ellie Whiteaker
- In office 1 July 2008 – 30 June 2014

Member of the Legislative Council of Western Australia
- In office 22 May 2001 – 29 October 2007
- Succeeded by: Batong Pham
- Constituency: East Metropolitan

Personal details
- Born: 18 April 1972 (age 54) Kalgoorlie, Western Australia, Australia
- Party: Australian Labor Party
- Spouse: Rebecca Misich (m. 2023)
- Domestic partner: Aram Hosie (2005–2015)
- Website: www.louisepratt.com

Louise Clare Pratt (born 18 April 1972) is an Australian politician who served as a Senator for Western Australia from 2008 to 2014 and from 2016 to 2025. She is a member of the Labor Party, and served as a member of the Western Australian Legislative Council from 2001 to 2007. She was the youngest woman ever elected to the Legislative Council at the time of her election and the second open lesbian to be elected to an Australian parliament.

== Early life ==
Pratt was born in Kalgoorlie, Western Australia. Her father was born in Devon, England, and she was a British citizen by descent until renouncing it prior to the 2007 election. Pratt grew up in the outer hills suburbs of Perth, where she attended Eastern Hills Senior High School. She obtained a Bachelor's degree at the University of Western Australia, where she became involved in student politics. After taking on a number of positions at her campus, she was elected as the state education officer for the National Union of Students, as well as a member of its national executive, in 1994.

After university, Pratt became involved in gay rights activism, serving as a regular spokesperson for Gay and Lesbian Equality, a prominent advocacy group in the state. This saw her addressing issues such as discrimination, unequal age of consent laws, homophobia in schools and property rights, and frequently saw her clash with the conservative Liberal Party of Western Australia government of Richard Court. It also saw Pratt working in concert with fellow activist Brian Greig, who became a Senator for and at one point interim leader of the Australian Democrats.

== State politics ==
Pratt remained active in the Labor Party outside of student politics, and was the Labor candidate in the then-safe Liberal state seat of Alfred Cove at the 1996 state election. She worked at various times for former MLA Megan Anwyl, Jim McGinty, Geoff Gallop, and federal MP Carmen Lawrence. It was while working as electorate officer for Lawrence that Pratt won the third position on the Labor ticket for the East Metropolitan Region at the 2001 state election. Labor won the election against expectations, and Pratt scraped into the final seat in the region, becoming the youngest woman ever elected to the Legislative Council.

Pratt took her seat with the new term of the Legislative Council in May 2001. Her maiden speech was notable for the suggestion that the voting age in the state should be dropped to 16, but her first major contribution came in July, when she was appointed to a Ministerial committee on gay and lesbian law reform with a wide mandate to make recommendations regarding the elimination of discrimination in state law. Pratt, along with lesbian Green MP Giz Watson, played a major role in the committee, which ultimately made a wide range of recommendations, and which was tabled in the Western Australian parliament on 2 August 2001. The committee's recommendations were largely taken into law with the 2002 passage of the Acts Amendment (Lesbian and Gay Law Reform) Act 2002. Amongst the reforms included in the act were a complete ban on discrimination on the basis of sexual orientation, the granting of the right for same-sex couples to adopt children, a lowering of the age of consent from 21 to 16, the right for same-sex couples to inherit from a deceased partner, and the repeal of legislation which had made it an offence to promote homosexuality in schools.

After the conclusion of the law reform debate, Pratt became relatively less vocal in the media and received some criticism in the state media for making only 24 speeches in her first 15 months in parliament. However, she was no less active in her role – taking up the issue of greenhouse emissions through her position on the Standing Committee on Environment and Public Affairs, and advocating for midwife-led models of care in maternity services. She was comfortably re-elected at the 2005 state election, and was promoted to chair of the Environment and Public Affairs committee after the election. She also continued to pursue her interests in midwifery services through her role as a member of the Public Obstetric Services Select Committee, and served as Chair of the State Government Adoption Legislation Review Committee. Pratt made some headlines again in December 2005, arguing for the introduction of civil union legislation in the state.

== Federal politics ==
=== First term (2008–2014) ===
Pratt began campaigning for Labor preselection for a Senate seat for the 2007 federal election in mid-2006. She received wide cross-factional support, and achieved a shock victory in October, topping the poll to win first position on the Labor ticket ahead of incumbent Senators Mark Bishop and Ruth Webber. This resulted in Webber's subsequent defeat at the general election after being dropped to the only marginally winnable third position. Pratt subsequently resigned from her Legislative Council seat in October 2007, and as the highest-placed Labor candidate, was easily elected to the Senate in November. Batong Pham, a former political staffer, was appointed to Pratt's former Legislative Council seat on 26 November 2007.

In the Senate, Pratt was made a member of the Joint Standing Committee on Treaties, the Standing Committee on Economics, and the Standing Committee on Environment, Communications and the Arts. She made her first speech on 27 August 2008, in which she mentioned a range of policy issues with which was concerned: sexuality, the environment, foreign aid, immigration, social inclusion and workforce participation.

In September 2012 Pratt, along with three other Labor Senators co-sponsored a Bill to amend the Marriage Act (1961) and enable same-sex marriages to be recognised. The Bill was ultimately defeated, however Pratt's impassioned speech in support of the Bill received widespread national and international attention. In December 2013, Pratt, along with Senators Sue Boyce (LNP) and Sarah Hanson-Young (The Greens) established a cross-party working group on marriage equality.

Pratt went on to become Shadow Parliamentary Secretary for the Environment, Climate Change and Water in 2013, a position she held until her defeat at the Federal Senate Election in 2014. Pratt's defeat at that election marked a highly unusual episode in Australian politics – after initially being narrowly elected in the 2013 general Federal election, a Senate recount was held and Pratt's seat was lost. However, 1375 votes were lost during the recount, resulting in the High Court ordering that a new, half-Senate only election be held in WA. During the subsequent campaign, Labor's vote declined significantly and Pratt failed to regain her seat in the final result.

=== Second term (2016–2025) ===
Following Pratt's defeat she took up work in the community sector, working for Western Australia's peak housing and homelessness service and serving on the Board of the Burnett Institute. She was the fourth candidate (out of 12 rather the usual 6 for half-Senate elections, due to the double dissolution) on the Western Australian ALP ticket for the Senate in the 2016 election, and was re-elected to the Senate. Following her election, Pratt was subsequently appointed to the Shadow Ministry, as Shadow Assistant Minister for Families and Communities. In May 2022 Pratt was appointed Deputy Government Whip in the Senate. In February 2024 Pratt announced her retirement from the Senate.

== Subsequent activities ==
In January 2026, Pratt was appointed by the Western Australian state government to a three-year term as a non-executive director of the Water Corporation.

== Personal life ==
Pratt has a son, born in October 2014, who she co-parents with her former partner Aram Hosie, a trans man and LGBTI community activist, as well as Western Australian state Labor MLC Stephen Dawson and his partner Dennis Liddelow, one of whom is the biological father. Pratt married her long-term partner Rebecca Misich in June 2023.

== See also ==
- Women in the Australian Senate
- Women in the Western Australian Legislative Council
