= Helen Morton =

Australian politician

Member of the Western Australian Legislative Council for East Metropolitan Region
- In office 22 May 2005 – 21 May 2017

Personal details
- Born: Helen Margaret James; 30 September 1949 (age 76) Kojonup, Western Australia
- Party: Liberal
- Spouse: Allan Morton (m. 1970)

Helen Margaret Morton (born 30 September 1949) is an Australian politician. She was a Liberal member of the Western Australian Legislative Council from 2005 to 2017, representing the region of East Metropolitan.

On 14 December 2010, Morton was appointed Minister for Mental Health and Disability Services. Before that she was a parliamentary secretary for various ministries. Morton graduated in 1969 with an Associate Diploma in Occupational Therapy from the Western Australian Institute of Technology (now Curtin University).

After the 2013 state election, Morton added the portfolio of child protection to her existing portfolios.

Morton was also the Deputy Leader of the Upper House in the Legislative Council.

Political offices
Preceded by Simon O'Brien	Minister for Disability Services; 2010–2016	Succeeded by Donna Faragher
Preceded by Graham Jacobs	Minister for Mental Health; 2010–2016	Succeeded by Andrea Mitchell
Preceded by Robyn McSweeney	Minister for Child Protection; 2013–2016	Succeeded by Andrea Mitchell
