= Ljiljanna Ravlich =

Australian politician

The Honourable Ljiljanna Ravlich OAM
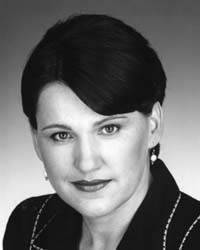

Member of the Western Australian Legislative Council for East Metropolitan/North Metropolitan
- In office 22 May 1997 – 10 March 2015
- Succeeded by: Martin Pritchard

Minister for Education and Training
- In office 10 March 2005 – 13 December 2006
- Premier: Alan Carpenter
- Preceded by: Alan Carpenter
- Succeeded by: Mark McGowan

Minister for Local Government
- In office 2 March 2007 – 23 September 2008
- Premier: Alan Carpenter
- Preceded by: John Bowler
- Succeeded by: John Castrilli
- In office 21 September 2004 – 10 March 2005
- Premier: Geoff Gallop
- Preceded by: Tom Stephens
- Succeeded by: John Bowler

Personal details
- Born: 9 January 1958 (age 68) Split, Croatia, FPR Yugoslavia
- Domestic partner: Eric Ripper
- Education: Curtin University of Technology

Ljiljanna Maria Ravlich (born Ljiljana Ravlić on 9 January 1958 in Split, Croatia, FPR Yugoslavia) is a Western Australian politician. She was a Labor Party member of the Western Australian Legislative Council from 1997 to 2015. She was the Minister for Education during the debate over the introduction of outcomes-based education. She subsequently served as Minister for Government Enterprises; Multicultural Interests and Citizenship; Youth; and Minister Assisting the Minister for Planning and Infrastructure.

== Early life ==
Ravlich lived in the small village of Kozica, Croatia until the age of five, when her family emigrated to Perth, Western Australia in 1963. Her family initially lived in Midland, and Ravlich attended Governor Stirling Senior High School. She continued her tertiary education at Curtin University of Technology where she completed a BA (SocSc) majoring in economics and also Graduate Diplomas in Education and Education Administration. From 1980, she worked as a high school teacher in Norseman, Kambalda, Northam and Morawa. Later she moved into education management before starting her own consulting company. She married in 1984, but the marriage lasted only two years.

== Political career ==
Ravlich was elected to the Legislative Council in 1996, becoming the first woman born in a non-English speaking country to enter the Parliament of Western Australia. She is also thought to be the first Croatian-born woman elected to a parliament outside Croatia. When the Gallop Labor government was elected in 2001, she served as a parliamentary secretary until 2005, when she was appointed as Local Government Minister.

Shortly afterwards she became the Minister for Education. Charged with the implementation of a controversial outcomes-based education policy, she held a high-profile portfolio and received much media coverage before losing her ministerial position in December 2006. PLATO WA, a community-based lobby group, celebrated her demotion.

In March 2007, as a result of a cabinet reshuffle by Premier Alan Carpenter, Ravlich was reinstated into the cabinet.

Ravlich was awarded the Medal of the Order of Australia in the 2026 King's Birthday Honours for "service to the people and Parliament of Western Australia, and to the community".

She lives in Cottesloe, and is the partner of Western Australia's former State Opposition Leader Eric Ripper.
