= Albert Marks =

Albert Marks may refer to:

- Albert S. Marks (1836–1891), American attorney, soldier and politician
- Albert A. Marks Jr., American businessman, head of the Miss America Pageant
- Jack Marks (politician) (Albert John Marks, 1924–1998), Australian politician and trade union official
