= Minister for Housing (Western Australia) =

- Incumbent; John Carey since 19 March 2021
- Department of Communities (Western Australia)
- Appointer: Governor of Western Australia

Minister for Housing is a position in the government of Western Australia, currently held by John Carey of the Labor Party. The position was first created after the 1947 state election, for the government of Sir Ross McLarty, and has existed in every government since then. The minister is responsible for the state government's Department of Communities, as well as several other government agencies.

== Titles ==
- 1 April 1947 – 1 July 2001: Minister for Housing
- 1 July 2001 – 28 April 2010: Minister for Housing and Works
- 28 April 2010 – present: Minister for Housing

== List of ministers ==
Term start	Term end	Minister(s)	Party
1 April 1947	5 January 1948	Ross McLarty	Liberal
5 January 1948	7 October 1949	Ross McDonald	Liberal
7 October 1949	6 April 1950	Arthur Watts	Country
6 April 1950	24 October 1950	David Brand	Liberal
24 October 1950	23 February 1953	Gerald Wild	Liberal
23 February 1953	2 April 1959	Herb Graham	Labor
2 April 1959	16 March 1965	Arthur Griffith	Liberal
16 March 1965	3 March 1971	Des O'Neil	Liberal
3 March 1971	12 October 1971	Don Taylor	Labor
12 October 1971	8 April 1974	Arthur Bickerton	Labor
8 April 1974	5 June 1975	Des O'Neil (again)	Liberal
5 June 1975	10 March 1977	Peter Jones	National Country
10 March 1977	25 August 1978	Ray O'Connor	Liberal
25 August 1978	5 March 1980	Alan Ridge	Liberal
5 March 1980	12 February 1981	Andrew Mensaros	Liberal
12 February 1981	25 January 1982	Peter Jones (again)	National Country
25 January 1982	14 May 1982	Ray Young	Liberal
14 May 1982	25 February 1983	Richard Shalders	Liberal
25 February 1983	25 February 1988	Keith Wilson	Labor
25 February 1988	12 February 1990	Pam Beggs	Labor
19 February 1990	5 February 1991	Yvonne Henderson	Labor
5 February 1991	16 February 1993	Jim McGinty	Labor
16 February 1993	24 August 1993	Doug Shave	Liberal
24 August 1993	25 January 1994	Richard Lewis	Liberal
25 January 1994	21 December 1995	Kevin Prince	Liberal
21 December 1995	9 January 1997	Graham Kierath	Liberal
9 January 1997	16 February 2001	Kim Hames	Liberal
16 February 2001	27 June 2003	Tom Stephens	Labor
27 June 2003	10 March 2005	Nick Griffiths	Labor
10 March 2005	3 February 2006	Fran Logan	Labor
3 February 2006	23 September 2008	Michelle Roberts	Labor
23 September 2008	28 April 2010	Troy Buswell	Liberal
28 April 2010	14 December 2010	Bill Marmion	Liberal
14 December 2010	12 July 2012	Troy Buswell (again)	Liberal
12 July 2012	21 March 2013	Terry Redman	National
21 March 2013	8 December 2014	Bill Marmion (again)	Liberal
8 December 2014	15 August 2016	Colin Holt	National
15 August 2016	17 March 2017	Brendon Grylls	National
17 March 2017	22 March 2017	Bill Johnston	Labor
22 March 2017	19 March 2021	Peter Tinley	Labor
19 March 2021		John Carey	Labor

== See also ==
- Minister for Planning (Western Australia)
- Minister for Housing (Australia)
- Minister for Housing (Victoria)
- Minister for Housing (New South Wales)
