= Mandated reporter =

People legally required to report abuse

A mandated reporter is a person who is required by law to report crimes, typically if they know or suspect a child or vulnerable adult has been or is at risk of being abused or neglected. Mandatory reporting laws can also extend to vulnerable adults due to a disability, mental illness, or old age. If a mandated reporter does not report these crimes, they may be subject to civil and criminal penalties for failing to report. Mandated reporters include people with professions involving children, vulnerable adults, and emergency services (i.e., teachers, physicians, and police officers), while other states consider all adults to be mandated reporters regardless of their profession.

== History ==
In 1962, United States doctors C. Henry Kempe and Brandt Steele published "The Battered Child Syndrome", which helped doctors identify child abuse, its effects, and the need to report serious physical abuse to legal authorities. Its publication changed the prevalent views in the United States, where child abuse was previously seen as uncommon, and not a regular issue. In 1974, the United States Congress passed the Child Abuse Prevention and Treatment Act (CAPTA), which provides funds to states for development of CPS and hotlines to prevent serious injuries to children. These laws and the media and advocacy coverage and research brought about a gradual change in societal expectations on reporting in the United States and, at different rates, in other western nations.

Originally created to respond to physical abuse, reporting systems in various countries began to expand to address sexual abuse and emotional abuse, child neglect, and exposure to domestic abuse. This expansion was accompanied by broader requirements for reporting abuse: previously reports were only submitted when an incident caused serious physical injury, but as the definitions changed, more minor physical injuries and developmental and psychological trauma began to be included as well.

In the U.S. as of 2013, there had been a huge increase of reporting over the decades with enormous numbers of unsubstantiated cases. Referrals increased each year, but the actual substantiated cases remained low and are approximately the same or declined each year. A Swedish commentator wrote that "media and commentators often take the number of referrals to be synonymous with the number of cases of actual child maltreatment", which makes the problem appear larger than it is.

In 2014, in response to the Penn State sex abuse scandal, then-Governor Tom Corbett passed a bill which extended the state's mandatory reporting obligations to include additional professionals as a measure to increase reports concerning child abuse. However, an article published by NBC News and ProPublica found in the first half of the 2010s (before the changes), there were 29,766 children investigated with only 10,410 being substantiated. In the later half of the decade, after the changes, the number of reported children was 42,366, but only 10,399 were sustained. Critics of mandatory reporting laws point out the number of fatalities relating to child abuse rose from 96 in 2014 to 194 in 2021 (seven years after the implementation).

== Criteria for mandatory reporting of child abuse by jurisdiction ==
The criteria for reporting vary significantly based on jurisdiction. Typically, mandatory reporting applies to people who have reason to suspect the abuse or neglect of a child, but it can also apply to people who suspect abuse or neglect of a dependent adult or the elderly, or to any members of society (sometimes called Universal Mandatory Reporting [UMR]). A large majority of European countries – 86 percent – have some form of mandatory reporting; 77 percent of African countries do; 72 percent of Asian countries and 90 percent of the Americas do.

In Australia, the Northern Territory requires all citizens to report suspected child abuse, and the other states and territories have mandatory reporting for designated work roles.

In Brazil, notification is mandatory in the health system, in schools and by the Child Protection Councils (CPC) network, present in many municipalities.

In Malaysia, The Child Act 2001 requires any medical officer or medical practitioner, childcare provider or member of the family to notify his/her concerns, suspicions or beliefs that a child may have been abused or neglected to the appropriate child protection authority in the country. Failure to do so can result in criminal charges.

In South Africa, Section 110 of the Children's Act, 2005 mandates 'Any correctional official, dentist, homeopath, immigration official, labour inspector, legal practitioner, medical practitioner, midwife, minister of religion, nurse, occupational therapist, physiotherapist, psychologist, religious leader, social service professional, social worker, speech therapist, teacher, traditional health practitioner, traditional leader or member of staff or volunteer worker at a partial care facility, drop-in centre or child and youth care centre' to report when they suspect that a child has been abused 'in a manner causing physical injury, sexually abused or deliberately neglected'. The Sexual Offences Act, 1957, compels all citizens who are aware of the sexual exploitation of children to report the offence to the police.

Under UK law only local authority social workers, health and social service board social workers (Northern Ireland) and police have a duty to report suspicions that a child is in need of care and protection. Local child protection guidelines and professional codes of conduct may expect other professionals, such as teachers and medical staff, to report, but they do not have to do so as a matter of law. Front-line professionals are also required to report cases of female genital mutilation.

=== North America ===
In the United States, states frequently amend their laws, but as of April 2019 all states, the District of Columbia, American Samoa, Guam, the Northern Mariana Islands, Puerto Rico, and the U.S. Virgin Islands have statutes identifying persons who are required to report suspected child maltreatment to an appropriate agency.

Approximately 48 states, the District of Columbia, American Samoa, Guam, the Northern Mariana Islands, Puerto Rico, and the Virgin Islands designate professions the members of which are mandated by law to report child maltreatment.

As of April 2019, in 18 states and Puerto Rico, any person who suspects child abuse or neglect is required to report suspected abuse or neglect regardless of profession. In all other States, territories, and the District of Columbia, any non-mandated person is also allowed to report.

Canada imposes a mandatory requirement on all citizens, except in the Yukon Territory where it is restricted to those who come in contact with children in their professional roles.

Mexico also has legislative reporting duties.

=== European Union ===
The Council of Europe has urged all countries to have mandatory reporting of child abuse, but several European countries do not: As of 2015, 15 member states (Bulgaria, Croatia, Denmark, Estonia, France, Hungary, Ireland, Lithuania, Luxembourg, Poland, Romania, Slovenia, Spain and Sweden, as well as the United Kingdom, which has left the EU on 31 January 2020) have reporting obligations in place for all professionals. In 10 member states (Austria, Belgium, Cyprus, the Czech Republic, Greece, Finland, Italy, Latvia, Portugal and Slovakia) existing obligations only address certain professional groups such as social workers or teachers.

As of 2015, specific reporting obligations existed also for civilians, to report cases of child abuse, neglect and/or exploitation existed in more than half (15) of the EU member states (Bulgaria, Croatia, Cyprus, the Czech Republic, Denmark, Estonia, Finland, Ireland, Italy, Latvia, Lithuania, Portugal, Slovakia, Slovenia and Sweden). In many member states without specific provisions, general provisions on the obligation for all citizens to report a criminal act under national law apply, but with no specific obligation to report a child at risk of abuse.

Notably, as of March 2014 Germany, Malta and the Netherlands had no reporting obligations in place. Malta created a new draft Child Protection Act (Out of Home Care), introducing the obligation of mandatory reporting for all professionals and volunteers.

== Processes for reporting ==
The processes for reporting vary greatly among jurisdictions.

Mandated reporters are usually required to give their name when they make a report. This allows investigators to contact them for further details if needed, and protects the mandated reporter from accusations that they did not report as required by law.

Typically, reporters are encouraged to report their suspicions and not to investigate or wait for absolute proof, which can lead to further harm directed at the suspected victim, and allow for perpetrators to prepare their defence through intimidation. The investigation of the abuse is then left to professionals. Some jurisdictions allow clear protections for reports made in good faith, protecting the disclosure of the reporter's name.

Innocence should be presumed unless and until evidence establishing guilt is obtained and it must be remembered that only suspicions are being reported.

=== Professions and reporting ===
Mandated reporting requirements generally apply to professions that have frequent contact with children, although in some jurisdictions all citizens are required to report suspicions of some forms of abuse. Other jurisdictions have mandated requirements only of doctors or medical professionals.

Jurisdictions may note that, while these groups are legally required (mandated) to report, most jurisdictions allow for voluntary reports by any concerned people.

=== Clergy–penitent privilege and other exemptions ===
Conflicts between a mandated reporter's duties and some privileged communication statutes are common but, in general, attorney–client privileges and clergy–penitent privileges are exempt from mandatory reporting in many jurisdictions. In some states in the US, psychiatrist and psychologists are also exempt from mandatory reporting.

"Clergy–penitent privilege" is privileged communication that protects communication between a member of the clergy and a communicant, who shares information in confidence. When applied, neither the minister nor the "penitent" can be forced to testify in court, by deposition, or other legal proceedings, about the contents of the communication. Most US states provide the privilege, typically in rules of evidence or civil procedure, and the confidentiality privilege has also been extended to non-catholic clergy and non-Sacramental counseling.

== Statistics by country ==
=== Australia ===
In 2015–16, of the total number of notifications (355,935), 164,987 cases (involving 115,024 children) of child abuse were investigated or were in the process of being investigated. Of these investigations, 60,989 cases were substantiated

=== Brazil ===
Brazil has a mandatory reporting system for child maltreatment that is enforced by the health and educational systems, but due to the absence of national prevalence surveys, the difference between data generated by such mandatory reports and actual incidence of abuse is not known, although it is believed that mandatory report systems may result in underreporting. While specific data on mandatory reporting is unavailable, data collected from 314 municipalities (out of 5564) across the country revealed that in the second half of 2005 alone, 27,986 children received attention from the Social Welfare Centers: either because of sexual abuse (13,240), psychological violence (4,340), neglect (4,073), physical violence (3,436) and sexual exploitation (2,887). Most victims were in the 7–14 years group (17,738). 4,936 were under 6 years old.

=== Canada ===
Canada provides data on substantiations but not reports. In Canada in 2008, 36% of all investigations were substantiated, with a further 8% of investigations where maltreatment remained suspected by the worker at the conclusion of the investigation and a further 5% with a risk of future maltreatment. 30% of investigations were unfounded and 17% resulted in no risk of future maltreatment was indicated.

=== United Kingdom ===
England provides data on substantiations but not reports. In 2012, the UK reports 50,573 children were on child protection registers or subject to a child protection plan: England (42,850), Scotland (2,706), Wales (2,890), Northern Ireland (2,127).

=== United States ===
In the US there was a 2348% increase in hotline calls from 150,000 in 1963 to 3.3 million in 2009. In 2011, there were 3.4 million calls. From 1992 to 2009 in the US, substantiated cases of sexual abuse declined 62%, physical abuse decreased 56% and neglect 10%. Although the referrals increase each year, about 1% of the child population is affected by any form of substantiated maltreatment.

In the US, there are approximately 3.6 million calls each year: 9,000/day, 63,000/week, affecting on average 1 out of 10 U.S. families with children under the age of 18 each year (there are 32.2 million such families). From 1998 to 2011 there were a total of 43 million hotline calls. Of those substantiated, over half are minor situations and many are situations where the worker thinks something may happen in the future. The largest category was neglect.

Each year in the US, approximately 85% of hotline calls either do not warrant investigation or are not substantiated. Approximately 78% of all investigations are unsubstantiated and approximately 22% are substantiated, with around 9% where "alternative responses" are offered in some states, which have a focus on working with the family to address issues rather than confirming maltreatment.

== Criticism ==
Originally created to respond to physical abuse, reporting systems in various countries have expanded the reportable incidents, when it was recognised that sexual and emotional abuse, neglect, and exposure to domestic abuse also have profound impacts on children's wellbeing. Critics of investigations into reports of child abuse state that

- A child may be wrongfully removed.
- Long, repeated interrogations and physical examinations can leave emotional scars.
- Even if not removed, there may be ongoing fear, distrust and insecurity.
- Long-term foster care can leave lasting psychological scars and do irreparable damage to the parent/child bond.
- An accusation of wrongdoing may disrupt a family even if allegations are dismissed. Often threats and an assumption of guilt over innocence lead to feelings of powerlessness, inadequacy, depression, denial of due process and liberties, reputations tarnished and privacy invaded, and legal consequences if assumed guilty.
- There may be economic harm due to the need to obtain legal representation to defend one's self and comply with the requirements demanded of them.

Critics state that mandatory reporting may also

- overload the child welfare system and increase the tax burden.
- increase the number of unfounded reports or reports that (due to vague and broad laws) do not merit governmental interference.
- jeopardize the ability of people, including abused people, to seek medical treatment or maintain a therapeutic relationship, for fear of being reported.
- disproportionately affect African-American families.
- discourage fellow citizens from taking positive neighborhood action with families in trouble, as they may consider that their responsibilities have been met when they call in an anonymous hotline.

They also state that mandatory reporting laws have had unintended consequences for the accused. Individuals, including juveniles, who have never been convicted of anything may be placed on CPS Central Registries/databases (different from Sex Abuse Registries) for decades, limiting educational and employment opportunities due to background checks. There is a 1.2–12.3% recidivism rate (repeat substantiations within 6 months of initial substantiations). Some parents who have successfully managed a drug addiction and who are still receiving treatment have been subject to mandatory reporting, even though there was no suspicion of abuse of children or of drugs.

== See also ==
- Aiding and abetting
- Bystander effect
- Child protection
- Child abuse
- Dark figure of crime
- Death of Daniel Valerio
- Mandatory reporting in the United States
