= Minister for Planning and Infrastructure =

Minister for Planning and Infrastructure may refer to:

- Minister for Planning and Infrastructure (New South Wales)
- Minister for Planning and Infrastructure (Western Australia)
