= Kath French Secure Care Centre =

Government-run Secure Care Facility in Western Australia

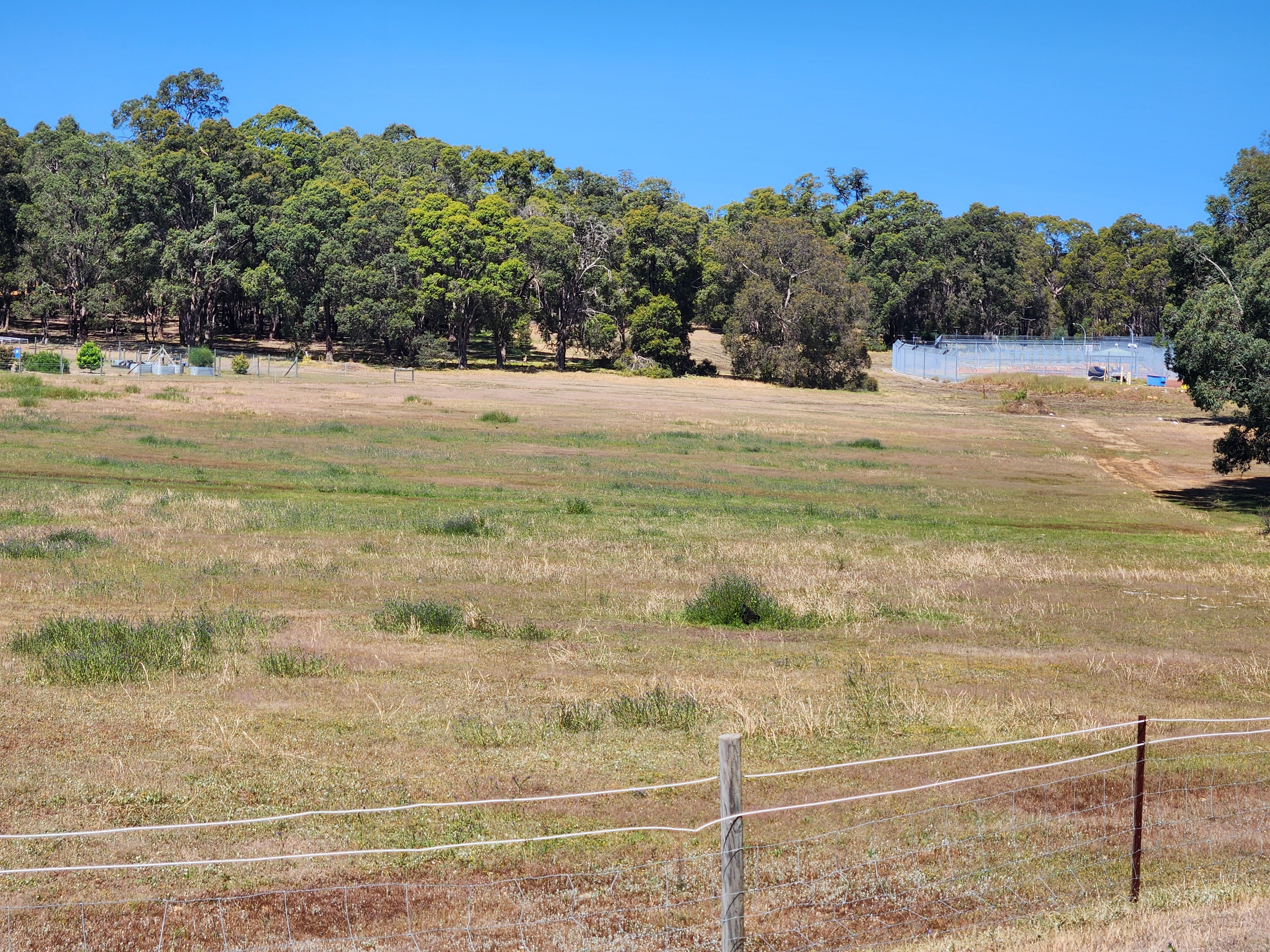
- Opened: May 2011
- Maximum Number of Occupants: 6

The Kath French Secure Care Centre (KFSCC) is a government-run centre that provides short-term mental health support for teenagers aged 12 to 18, who exhibit behaviours which pose a risk to themselves or others, such as suicidal ideation and substance abuse. The facility opened in May 2011, in Stoneville, Western Australia. It is the first and only secure care facility in Western Australia. The facility is not public, children may only be admitted under Secure Care orders. Children can stay for a maximum of 21 days, with one additional 21 day extension. The facility aims to provide WA children who are under the care of the Department of Communities with out-of-home care that assists in correcting dangerous behaviours such as self-harm, violence towards others, and substance abuse.

== History ==
=== Padbury Boys' Farm School (1946–1955) ===
On 25 February 1946, Padbury Boys' Farm School opened in Stoneville. It was created by Mr R.A. Peterkin, who was the manager of the Swan Boys' Home at the time. He was inspired by Fairbridge Farm School and the Christian Brothers' Farm Schools, located at Tardun and Bindoon respectively. Peterkin named the facility after Mr Walter Padbury, and his nephew Matthew Padbury. The Lotteries Commission and the Anglican Diocesan Council both gave grants of land, which had been vested in the Orphanage Board around 60 years earlier. Boys from Swan Boys' Home attended the school, and undertook agricultural traineeships. Boys helped clear land, work on the farm, create buildings, and helped fight fires in the community. It accommodated boys and men up to 60, however youth offenders became the major focus over time. The school closed in 1955 for financial reasons.

=== Anglican Farm School (1955–1962) ===
From 12 August 1955 to 1962, it was transformed into a reformatory for delinquent boys, run jointly by the Anglican Church, and the state government, running under the name of Anglican Farm School. According to R.A. Peterkin, the school was established as a response to a review of the WA child welfare system, which occurred in 1953. The school was meant to accommodate 20 boys, however in 1956 there were 35 at the end of the year, 65 at the end of 1957, 63 at the end of 1958, and 59 at the end of 1959. Abscondings were common, although the committee decided to keep the school relatively open to better meet the objective of re-education, however town members criticised that delinquent boys could easily escape. Until 1960, boys that were not suited to the school were transferred to Fremantle Prison. After 1960, boys who absconded frequently were sent to Riverbank.

=== Hillston Reformatory (1962–1984) ===
In 1962, it was renamed to Hillston Anglican Farm School, and ran similarly to the years prior. In 1969, the Hillston Anglican Farm School became the government-run reformatory named Hillston. In 1969, boys from 12 years of age were admitted to Hillston regularly. It became a much larger institution, which more than 200 admissions every year during the 1970s, peaking at 363 admissions in 1976. In 1972, the Child Welfare Department's annual report showed an increase in admissions to Hillston, partly due to non-payment of fines. During 1973, boys and staff begun building a new workshop complex. Between 1974 and 1975, a 40 percent increase in admissions was attributed to an increasing number of admissions for Aboriginal boys. By 1977, people who did not pay fines were no longer sent to Hillston, causing the number of admissions to ease. By 1980, 11 to 17 year old boys were admitted, with the average age of admission being 15 years. Hillston's last full year in 1983 had 187 admissions, and 198 discharges, which included 83 boys who were admitted more than once during that year. Hillston ceased operations in January 1984, as a result of recommendations from the 1982 Inquiry into the Treatment of Juvenile Offenders.

=== Kath French Assessment and Planning Centre (1999–2011) ===
The Kath French Assessment and Planning Centre begun operation in 1999, and formally opened in 2000, being run by the Department of Communities. It began providing assessment and intervention services to young people and their families. It was named after Kathleen Carina (Kath) French (1926-1994), because of her various contributions to the care of children.

=== Kath French Secure Care Centre (2011–present) ===
The Kath French Assessment and Planning Centre was renamed to the Kath French Secure Care Centre (KFSCC), and opened in May 2011, costing $7.36 million AUD. It had an initial capacity of 9 beds, designed for teenagers 12 to 18 who posed an imminent risk to themselves or others, often attributed to complex trauma, mental health, and behavioural challenges. Teens receive 24-hour care from professionals including nurses, psychiatrists, educators, and social workers. Shortly after opening, budget pressures forced a reduction from nine beds to six, along with reduced staffing from 33 to 28.

== Purpose ==
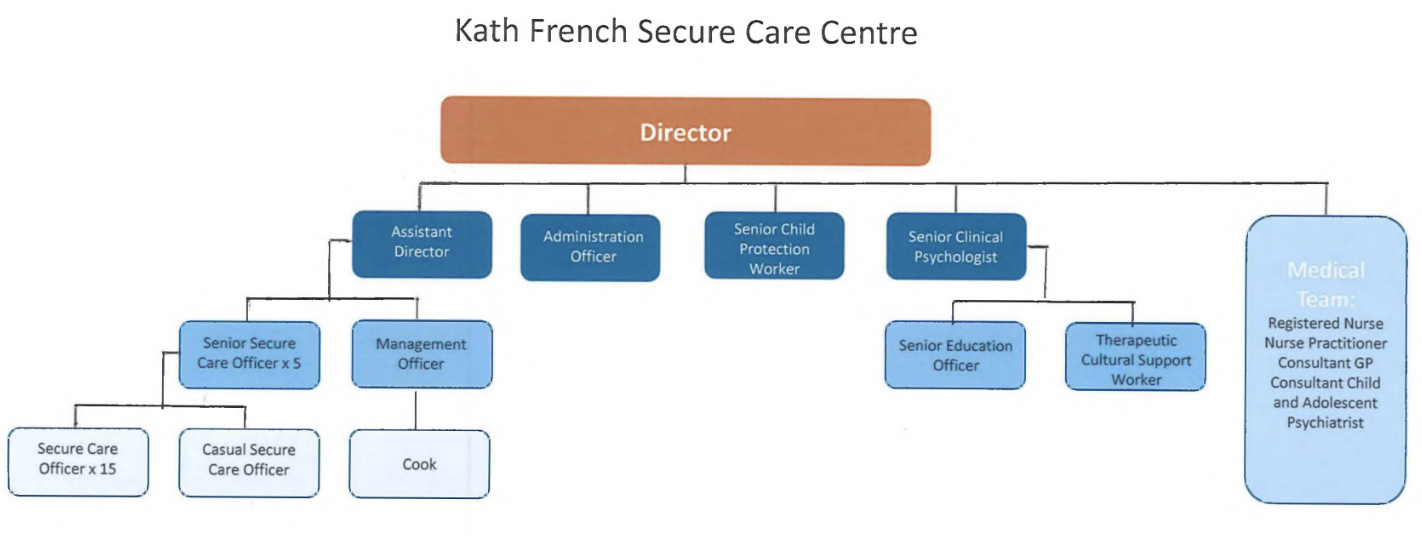
Employee Hierarchy of KFSCC

The KFSCC is intended to provide WA children which exhibit behaviours which pose a threat to their life or the lives of others (such as substance abuse, violence, etc.) with out-of-home-care, to give them access to medical professionals and therapists which help address complex behaviours and problems which may prevent them from maintaining longer term foster placements. It operates as a therapeutic and trauma-informed centre, which uses the sanctuary model. The KFSCC is designed to give 24/7 support, for short-term stays, usually ranging from 21 to 42 days. Children are admitted under secure care orders, issued under the Children and Community Services Act 2004 (WA), which states that children can stay in secure care for 21 days, with a maximum of one 21-day extension. The staff at KFSCC is a multi-disciplinary team which includes a Senior Clinical Psychologist, Senior Child Protection Worker, Senior Secure Care Officers, Secure Care Officers, General Practitioner (GP), Nurse, Assistant Director, and Director.

In Western Australia, children aged 12 to 18 may be admitted into secure care if they meet the following criteria:

- There is an immediate risk of the child causing harm to themselves or another person.
- There is no other suitable way to manage that risk.
- There is no other suitable way to support the child to receive necessary care.
- They are a protected child (the subject of a protection order) or in the provisional protection and care of the CEO (and either already the subject of a protection application in the Children's Court or to become one within two working days of admission).

Children under 12 may be allowed admittance if they are deemed "extreme risk", and where existing mental health services may not be able to manage that risk. When issued a Secure Care Order, it is mandatory to enter a Secure Care Facility.

The centre implements monitoring solutions, with the number of staff outnumbering the number of children. A range of activities such as arts & crafts, structured outdoor activities, psycho-educational programs, and regular check-ins with the psychologist and nurse are undertaken at KFSCC, which aims to teach life skills, healthy coping mechanisms, and social skills that children can then apply outside of the centre.

== Criticisms and Incidents ==
=== Reduction of Staff and Beds ===
Quickly after KFSCC was opened, pressures from budget challenges caused a reduction of beds, from 9 to 6, as well as a reduction of staff, from 33 to 28. This caused critics of Western Australia's secure care system to pose questions on the adequacy, and long-term viability of the model.

=== Admittance of children younger than 13 ===
The press release from the State Government clearly labelled KFSCC for "young people between 12—18 years". The media begun to report placements of those as young as 8 years old, significantly younger than what the government mandated.

=== Child RM Inquest ===
On the 16th of July, 2020, Coroner Jenkin delivered the inquest into the death of a person referred to as "Child RM" (name under suppression order). Child RM died on the 16th of April, 2017, from ligature compression of the neck, when she was 17-years old. Between 2012 and January 2017, Child RM was admitted to KFSCC 4 times. The coroner visited the centre on the 12th of June, 2020, to inspect the centre and make recommendations where applicable. He commented that the staff at KFSCC was an "eclectic mix of highly skilled professionals", and that they were passionate about the challenges of working with children that have complex needs and trauma. However, he commented that the structure was not built as a child focussed secure facility, with the design of the building and internal spaces working against the therapeutic aims of KFSCC. The coroner made three main recommendations, the Department of Community should consider an amendment to the Children and Community Services Act 2004 WA, to provide maximum secure care placement of greater than 42 days, due to a common sentiment from both the coroner, the children, and the staff, that 42 days was not long enough, however they also recognise that the structure of KFSCC was designed for short-term secure care, and would not be suitable for longer stays. He also recommended that the Department of Community implements a proposed complex community care service to help those transition from secure care, due to complaints from both staff, children, and the coroner that there is no "step-down" system from secure care, and that children would potentially benefit from a voluntary care service to help them with their transition. His final recommendation was for KFSCC to provide staff with a higher level of cultural competence, and that the Department of Community should hire a cultural therapeutic specialist at the centre, as "a matter of urgency", citing that First Nations children made up slightly over half of the intake to KFSCC, and that there was a lack of First Nations staff at the centre.

=== Cultural Safety Criticism and the Royal Commission ===
On Day 4 of Public Hearing 16 of the Royal Commission into Violence, Abuse, Neglect and Exploitation of People with Disability, they investigated "First Nations children with disability in out-of-home care", which included an investigation into KFSCC and WA's secure care system. Many of the recommendations from the Royal Commission's investigation have been acted on as of 22nd of September 2021.
