= Shared Location Information Platform =

The Shared Location Information Platform (SLIP) is an open data platform for Western Australia. The aim of SLIP is to improve access to, and use of location data across the public, private and research sectors.

SLIP is delivered on behalf of the Government of Western Australia by Landgate; and is supported through a whole-of-government collaboration called WALIS. SLIP is a key component in delivering on the Western Australian Whole-of-Government Open Data Policy (2015), which states that government agencies should make their datasets publicly available.

SLIP delivers data to users through services, including Maps such as Locate and Open Geospatial Consortium (OCG) compliant web services that can be used through Geographic information system. SLIP is now accessed through the WA Government's open data website, data.wa.gov.au (DataWA).
