= Department for Child Protection =

The Department for Child Protection may refer to the following government departments concerned with child protection in Australia:

- Department for Child Protection (South Australia)
- Department for Child Protection (Western Australia)
