= Western Australian Land Information System =

WALIS

Agency overview
- Formed: 1981
- Headquarters: Perth, Western Australia; 31°53′12″S 116°0′18″E
- Minister responsible: John Carey, Minister for Planning
- Agency executive: Peter Birkett, Director Data Collaboration, Landgate
- Website: www.landgate.wa.gov.au

The Western Australian Land Information System (WALIS) was established by the Government of Western Australia in 1981. It is responsible for coordinating the discovery of, and access to, location-based or geographic data generated by WA Government agencies. WALIS achieves this through partnerships between organisations, projects, committees and working groups; coordinated through Landgate.

== History ==
The idea for WALIS began in the late-1970s although WALIS was not established until 1981. Since that time there have been many people involved in WALIS, some restructures and many different plans and strategies.

Central to WALIS management was the Land Information System Advisory Committee, established as a forum to represent the interests of the public and private sector. The main WALIS group was the Land Information System Support Centre (LISSC), composed of technology and skilled personnel.

By 1986, the rapid growth of GIS forced a re-evaluation of the strategies of WALIS. WALIS began to emphasise the establishment of on-line access to data.

In 1987, the WALIS committee structure was rearranged to a three-tier structure. This structure comprised the WALIS Executive Policy Committee (EPC), which was retained from the inception of WALIS, WALIS Council and the WALIS Secretariat.

In October 1988, the EPC formed a WALIS Marketing Taskforce to develop a policy for the marketing of state government information. Coopers & Lybrand WD Scott were contracted to research market value of land information in WA.

In June 1990, Cabinet approved a number of recommendations including the elevation of WALIS to full program status within the Department of Land Administration (DOLA) – now known as Landgate. A second recommendation was to make the Minister for Lands the accountable minister. This is how WALIS still stands today.

In November 1994, the WALIS Advisory Committee (WAC) met for the first time. This committee was formed to provide strategic advice to the WALIS Executive Policy Committee on land information management from a community perspective. The WALIS Advisory Committee was disbanded by the Minister for Lands in 2009.

In 2011, a revised governance framework for WALIS was established, focused on implementing the Location Information Strategy for Western Australia approved by the Western Australian State Cabinet in August 2011. The Location Information Strategy in turn supports the Western Australian Whole of Government Open Data Policy, which seeks to better utilise the public sector's data assets by making them easily discoverable and accessible through the WA Open Data Service at https://data.wa.gov.au/.

In 2017, the WALIS Council remains an important forum for collaboration and information sharing between WA Government agencies on the management of location information, data and technologies.

== Benefits of WALIS ==
In the mid-seventies, several challenges with the management of land information in Western Australia arose. The electronic capture of location-based data, particularly tenure and cadastral information, began across several organisations. It was recognised that investment in electronic systems and the capture of this information needed to be coordinated across government in order to manage costs and prevent duplication of effort.

It was also recognised that by coordinating the management of location-based information across government, in consultation with the private sector and research organisations, this information could be re-used and add value to the broader economy of WA.

In 2004, ACIL Tasman Pty Ltd were commissioned to report on the value of WALIS. The report found that:

These two quantitative analyses yielded estimates of the value contributed by WALIS of $14 and $15 million a year, respectively, to the WA economy. WALIS also adds value because it enables a more efficient collection and production of spatial data. This was estimated to have an annual value of at least $1 million a year.

== The Location Information Strategy for Western Australia ==
The Location Information Strategy approved by the Western Australian State Cabinet in August 2011, is focused on making decision-making and processes, particularly infrastructure investment and delivery of services, timelier and more cost effective through the use of location information. The strategy builds on the long-established WALIS framework and the Shared Location Information Platform (SLIP) to improve the capture, integration and sharing of location information across Western Australia, enhance planning capabilities and reduce the time for statutory approval of major projects across the State.

== WALIS International Forum ==
WALIS International Forum was established in 1984 to bring together government, private sector and research organisations involved in the capture and management of location-based data and information and refine best practice. The Forum developed into one of the largest geographic information events in Australia, and attracted nearly 1,000 delegates to Perth in conjunction with the 7th International Symposium on Digital Earth in 2011. The Forum was held every 18 months through to November 2013. Since that time, a diverse range of other smaller-format events have grown in popularity – providing an alternative to achieving the same aim.

== Capture WA ==
Capture WA is a program run by WALIS to co-ordinate the capture of spatial information across government. Western Australian state and local government agencies, as well as private industry and education institutes, can request information through the program in order to save money using collective buying power.

Capture WA requests can be entered via an online portal at any time, however for logistical reasons the requests are considered in a single batch each year. The next round of requests closes in April 2017.

== SLIP ==
Landgate (the Western Australian Land Information Authority), on behalf of the WALIS community, led the development of a groundbreaking WALIS concept that allows multiple government agencies to share spatial information – the Shared Location Information Platform, otherwise known as SLIP. SLIP allows access the government's significant land and geographic information resources through visual imagery and maps.

== See also ==
- ANZLIC
