= Ron Alexander =

Australian rules footballer, born 1950

Personal information
- Full name: Ronald James Alexander
- Born: 10 December 1950 (age 75)
- Height: 198 cm (6 ft 6 in)
- Weight: 115 kg (254 lb)

Playing career^{1}
Years	Club	Games (Goals)
1971–1975	East Perth	98 (49)
1976–1981	Fitzroy	133 (30)
1982–1985	East Fremantle	76 (96)
Total		307 (175)

Coaching career
Years	Club	Games (W–L–D)
1982–1986	East Fremantle	112 (68–44–0)
1987	West Coast	22 (11–11–0)
Total		134 (79–55–0)
- ^{1} Playing statistics correct to the end of 1987.

Career highlights
- 2x WAFL Premiership player: (1972, 1985); Fitzroy Best & Fairest: (1981); Fitzroy captain: (1979-80); West Australian Football Hall of Fame, inducted 2004

Ronald James Alexander AM (born 10 December 1950) is a former Australian rules footballer who played for the Fitzroy Football Club in the Victorian Football League (VFL) and for the East Perth Football Club and East Fremantle Football Club in the West Australian Football League (WAFL). He served as captain-coach of East Fremantle and was also the inaugural senior coach of the West Coast Eagles.

== Playing career ==
During his career he represented Western Australia 13 times, Victoria twice, and was awarded a Simpson Medal for a match against Victoria in 1974.

=== WANFL career ===
He began his career with East Perth Football Club where from 1971 to 1975 he played 98 games and kicked 49 goals. He was a big, strong muscular ruckman, weighing 115 kg and standing at 198 cm tall.

He was a member of their 1972 premiership team and won the club's fairest and best award in 1974.

=== VFL career ===
He then crossed over to Fitzroy in 1976. He was their captain from 1979 to 1980, and in 1981 won their best and fairest, finishing ahead of that season's Brownlow Medallist Bernie Quinlan by nine votes. In total he played 133 games and booted 30 goals for the Roys. While in Melbourne he gained a degree in Physical Education and for a time was president of the VFL Players Association. He went back to Perth after the 1981 season.

== Coaching career ==
He returned to Western Australia in 1982 and took on the role of captain/coach at East Fremantle taking them to the grand final in 1984, 1985 and 1986, winning the 1985 Premiership.

In 1986, after 76 games for East Fremantle, he stepped down as a player, but as coach he once again took his side the grand final and like 1984 they were again runners-up.

=== West Coast Eagles ===
In 1987, he was picked to be the inaugural senior coach of the West Coast Eagles.

He was controversially sacked and replaced by John Todd at the end of the 1987 season, despite 11 wins and being close to taking his side to the finals in their first year.

== After football ==
From 1999 to 2017, he was the director-general of the Western Australian Department of Sport and Recreation. (DSR). Over the decade commencing from 2000 the DSR achieved recognition and success with multiple Premier Awards and in 2016 received a commendation from the Western Australian Public Sector Commissioner for outstanding results in climate and culture surveys. DSR was also named on occasion in the WA Auditor Generals annual reports as a better practice agency. In 2017 the WA government decided to merge the department with the departments of local government, Culture and Arts, Racing Gaming and Liquor, some services from the Department of Aboriginal Affairs and Office of Muliticultural Interests. In the Queen's Birthday 2019 Honours List, Alexander was made a Member of the Order of Australia "for significant service to sport and recreation, and to public administration."

In October 2021, Alexander was elected to the North Ward of the City of Vincent. Alexander ran for mayor of the City of Vincent in the October 2023 local government elections, gaining 33 percent of the vote and coming second to Alison Xamon, who had 40 percent of the vote.
