= Philip Cummins =

Australian lawyer and judge (1939–2019)

The Honourable Philip Damien Cummins AM

Judge of the Supreme Court of Victoria
- In office February 1988 – November 2009

Personal details
- Born: 9 November 1939
- Died: 24 February 2019 (aged 79)
- Education: University of Melbourne
- Profession: Barrister, judge
- Awards: Member of the Order of Australia (2014)

Philip Damien Cummins AM (9 November 1939 – 24 February 2019) was an Australian lawyer and judge of the Supreme Court of Victoria. Cummins was the presiding judge in the trials of the Silk–Miller police murders, the death of Daniel Valerio and the trial of Robert Farquharson. He chaired the Protecting Victoria’s Vulnerable Children Inquiry in 2011 before being appointed chairperson of the Victorian Law Reform Commission. He was made a Member of the Order of Australia in the 2014 Queen's Birthday Honours.

== Early life and education ==
Cummins was born on 9 November 1939. He attended Xavier College before enrolling at the University of Melbourne, where he served as President of the Law Students' Society and Vice-President of the Students' Representative Society. He completed degrees in Arts, with a major in psychology, and Law. He later earned a Master of Science in Psychiatry by thesis, with First Class Honours, and subsequently reached the confirmation stage of a PhD, both at the University of Melbourne.

== Legal career ==
=== Solicitor and barrister ===
Cummins served his articles with Francis Patrick Mannix and Cleary Ross & Doherty, and was admitted to practise on 2 March 1964. After a single year working as a solicitor, he joined the Victorian Bar in early 1965, reading with Abraham Monester, who later became a Queen's Counsel. Cummins was appointed Queen's Counsel in 1978, after which he appeared regularly in common law matters in addition to his criminal practice.

=== Supreme Court of Victoria ===
Cummins was appointed a judge of the Supreme Court of Victoria in February 1988 and served until his retirement in November 2009. He sat in the Court of Appeal for eight years, and served as Senior Judge in the Trial Division and Principal Judge of the Criminal Division.

He presided over a number of high-profile criminal trials, including the Silk-Miller murders, the murder trial arising from the death of two-year-old Daniel Valerio, and the trial of Robert Farquharson. The Valerio case led Cummins to recommend the introduction of mandatory reporting of child abuse in Victoria, which was subsequently enacted into law. In his farewell address from the Supreme Court, he called for higher sentences for sexual and violent offences and for more clearly defined statutory rights for victims of crime.

== Post-judicial career ==
=== Child protection ===
Following his retirement from the bench, Cummins chaired the Protecting Victoria's Vulnerable Children Inquiry from 2010 to 2012. The inquiry produced a report of more than 700 pages containing 90 recommendations. The report identified an urgent need to reform the handling and reporting of possible harm to children, and became a key reference point for subsequent statutory and procedural reforms in Victorian child protection law. Cummins also served as inaugural Chair of the Victims of Crime Consultative Committee.

=== Victorian Law Reform Commission ===
In September 2012, Cummins was appointed Chair of the Victorian Law Reform Commission, a position he held until his death. Under his leadership, the Commission conducted approximately sixteen inquiries across a range of areas, including litigation funding, victims of crime assistance, organised crime in lawful industries, medicinal cannabis, mental impairment in criminal law, jury empanelment, succession laws, birth registration, and guardianship. Law reforms resulting from the Commission's work during his tenure included the legalisation of medicinal cannabis, adoption by same-sex couples, and measures for the protection of children from sex offenders.

== Academic work ==
Cummins maintained a long association with the University of Melbourne throughout his career. In his first year at the Bar he completed a Graduate Diploma in Criminology, and prior to taking silk he earned a coursework Master of Laws with First Class Honours. For more than twenty years he lectured in Legal Ethics and Professional Conduct at Melbourne Law School, where he also held the position of Honorary Senior Fellow. He co-conducted seminars on ethical issues for the National Judicial College of Australia and contributed sessions on victims of crime and family violence to the Judicial College of Victoria.

=== Other roles ===
Cummins served as President of Court Network from 2010 to 2014. He chaired the Victoria Law Foundation from 2009 to 2014, with a focus on its public legal education programme. After stepping down as Chair, he continued to speak to school students about the legal system. He also served as President of the Commonwealth Association of Law Reform Agencies, based in London.

== Honours ==
In June 2014, Cummins was appointed a Member of the Order of Australia in the Queen's Birthday Honours, for service to the judiciary and the law, to criminal justice and legal reform, to education, and to professional associations.

== Death ==
Cummins died in office on 24 February 2019 following a short illness, aged 79.

The Victorian Government issued a formal statement of condolence, with Attorney-General Jill Hennessy describing his contribution to the justice system as important and tireless. Chief Justice Anne Ferguson noted his long and distinguished service to the people of Victoria, the legal profession, and the Court. The President of the Law Institute of Victoria, Stuart Webb, acknowledged his contribution to law reform, access to justice, and public legal education.
