= Abduction of Cleo Smith =

2021 solved missing person case in Australia

- Date: 16 October – 3 November 2021
- Location: Gascoyne, Western Australia
- Perpetrator: Terence Darrell Kelly
- Outcome: Found alive
- Missing: Cleo Smith
- Convictions: Forcibly taking a child under 16, obstructing police
- Sentence: 13 years, 6 months in jail, A$1,000 fine

Cleo Smith was abducted on 16 October 2021 from a campsite in the Gascoyne region of Western Australia (WA) when she was four years old. She was found alive and well on 3 November, after police raided the home of Terence Darrell Kelly in the nearby town of Carnarvon. Her safe recovery after eighteen days was described as extremely rare, and received widespread news coverage and social media reaction both across Australia and internationally. Kelly was convicted of child abduction and sentenced to 13 years and 6 months in jail, and a A$1,000 fine.

== Disappearance ==
At the time of the incident, four-year-old Cleo Smith lived with her mother Ellie Smith, stepfather Jake Gliddon and her sister, in Carnarvon, Western Australia. At approximately 6:30 p.m. on 15 October 2021, the family arrived at the Blowholes campsite in Macleod, around 80 kilometres (50 mi) north of Carnarvon, for a weekend visit.

In an interview after Cleo's disappearance, Ellie said the girl had gone to bed in the family's tent at around 8 p.m., woke up early the next morning at 2:30 a.m. asking for water, and had returned to sleep after being given water. When the family woke at 6 a.m. on 16 October, they discovered both Cleo and her sleeping bag missing. The tent the family was sleeping in was opened to a length of about 30 centimetres (12 in) from its fully-open position.

== Search ==
The family briefly searched the area for Cleo, and informed police at 6:23 a.m. after they realised she was not in the vicinity of the campsite. A police car was dispatched seven minutes after the phone call, and arrived at the campsite at 7:10 a.m. Police conducted an air, land and sea search around the area for most of the day. Ellie stated Cleo had not left by herself, saying on 19 October "she would never leave us, she would never leave the tent".

On 20 October, Acting Deputy Commissioner Daryl Gaunt of the Western Australia Police Force said claims the case was being treated as an abduction were incorrect, explaining the case was being treated primarily as a search and rescue case. Inspector Jon Munday said on that same day that the zip on Cleo's tent was open higher than she could have reached, stating the positioning of the zipper was a primary factor which had given rise to concerns about Cleo's safety.

It was announced on 21 October that the police believed Cleo had been abducted, with WA Premier Mark McGowan announcing a $1 million reward for anyone with information on her disappearance. Various Australian media organisations reported this reward attracted bounty hunters to Carnarvon to search for Cleo.

Taskforce Rodia was launched by the Western Australia Police Force with assistance from the Australian Federal Police, involving more than 100 police officers led by Superintendent Rod Wilde.

While police did not rule out the possibility Cleo could have been taken out of WA to another state, Police Commissioner Chris Dawson noted strict border controls had been put in place in WA and other states, due to the COVID-19 pandemic, which would make undetected travel out of the state difficult.

== Discovery ==
On 3 November 2021, Cleo was found by police, unharmed inside a locked house located minutes from her family home in Carnarvon. Terence Darrell Kelly, a 36-year-old man, was subsequently taken into custody after a car he was driving was stopped by police. Deputy Commissioner Col Blanch said police had broken into the house at 12:46 a.m. and found Cleo in one of the rooms. Cleo was reunited with her family the same day. After being reunited with her daughter at the Carnarvon hospital, Cleo's mother noticed that her hair had been cut and dyed.

Police Commissioner Dawson called the day of her discovery "one of the most remarkable days in policing in Western Australia", and explained that forensic leads had led them to obtain a search warrant for the house. The discovery was attributed by the police to a key clue of a car spotted driving from the campsite in the early hours of 16 October, with the police having made a public plea for further information about it on 25 October. According to Blanch, police work utilising a large amount of information in the case was essential.

=== Reactions ===
Cleo's return was met with widespread joy and relief around Australia. Dawson was said to have broken down in tears upon hearing the news. The successful recovery also attracted media interest around the world.

According to Xanthé Mallett, associate professor of criminology at the University of Newcastle, it was extremely rare to find a child safe after such a lengthy time missing, and the case did not fit the pattern of the majority of child abduction cases.

== Criminal proceedings ==
On 4 November 2021, police charged 36-year-old Carnarvon resident Terence Darrell Kelly with two offences including one count of forcibly taking a child under 16. He appeared before the Carnarvon Magistrates Court and did not apply for bail. The matter returned to court on 6 December 2021. Kelly was flown to Perth on 5 November 2021 and was transferred to Casuarina Prison. He appeared via video link and pleaded guilty to one count of child stealing, but did not enter a plea on a charge of assaulting a public officer. The assault charge was subsequently downgraded to obstructing police officers, to which he pleaded guilty on 30 January 2023 and was fined A$1,000.

On 5 April 2023, Kelly was sentenced in Perth District Court to 13 1/2 years in jail. Kelly will be eligible for parole after serving 11 1/2 years. On 30 September 2024, Kelly failed in his appeal to reduce his sentence.

=== Background of perpetrator ===
Kelly was born in Wickham, Western Australia, to Indigenous Australian parents. His parents were alcoholics who were frequently violent towards each other and their children. He was subject to child protection intervention and at the age of two was placed into the care of his aunt Penny Walker, whom he referred to as his grandmother. He was diagnosed with attention deficit hyperactivity disorder and oppositional defiant disorder at a young age and at the age of twelve was hospitalised due to suicidal ideation. He was expelled from school due to violent, antisocial and inappropriate behaviour.

Prior to his conviction for Smith's abduction, Kelly had previously served a prison sentence for burglary and aggravated burglary offences, as well as receiving a fine for the possession of methamphetamine. He was released from prison in 2017 and returned to living with Walker. After Walker's death in 2020 he continued to occupy her public housing property in South Carnarvon. Kelly was raised in the same household as Ashley James Bropho, Walker's biological grandson. In 2023, Bropho was convicted of abducting and sexual assaulting a nine-year-old girl in Perth. Bropho was murdered by a fellow inmate at Hakea Prison in March 2023.

Kelly had a collection of "dozens" of Bratz dolls, some of which were preserved in their original packaging. He made a number of social media posts featuring photographs and videos of him with the dolls. He had also developed fantasies of himself as a father, creating Facebook pages for his own fictitious children and communicating with them; he falsely told police that the children were real. A medical assessment prior to his sentencing found that he was "severely fragile, disturbed and fragmented identity" and described him as "detached, anti-social, depressive and narcissistic with a severe personality disorder and paranoid schizophrenia with complex post-traumatic stress disorder, a moderate depressive disorder and anxiety".

Kelly had no connection to Cleo's family. He was described by his neighbours as very quiet and an oddball but had not been under suspicion by them. He had fallen under police suspicion the day before his arrest. The abduction was described by police superintendent Rod Wilde as opportunistic.

=== Misidentification of suspect ===
On 3 November 2021, media outlet Seven News named the wrong person as Cleo's alleged abductor, retracting and apologising later that day. The person misidentified claimed that the incident led to him receiving death threats and required him to undergo medical treatment following a severe panic attack; in response he planned to sue Seven for defamation. The defamation case was resolved in February 2022, with Seven West Media agreeing to pay out a settlement deal.

== See also ==
- List of solved missing person cases (2020s)
