= John Carey (Australian politician) =

Australian politician

The Honourable John Carey MLA
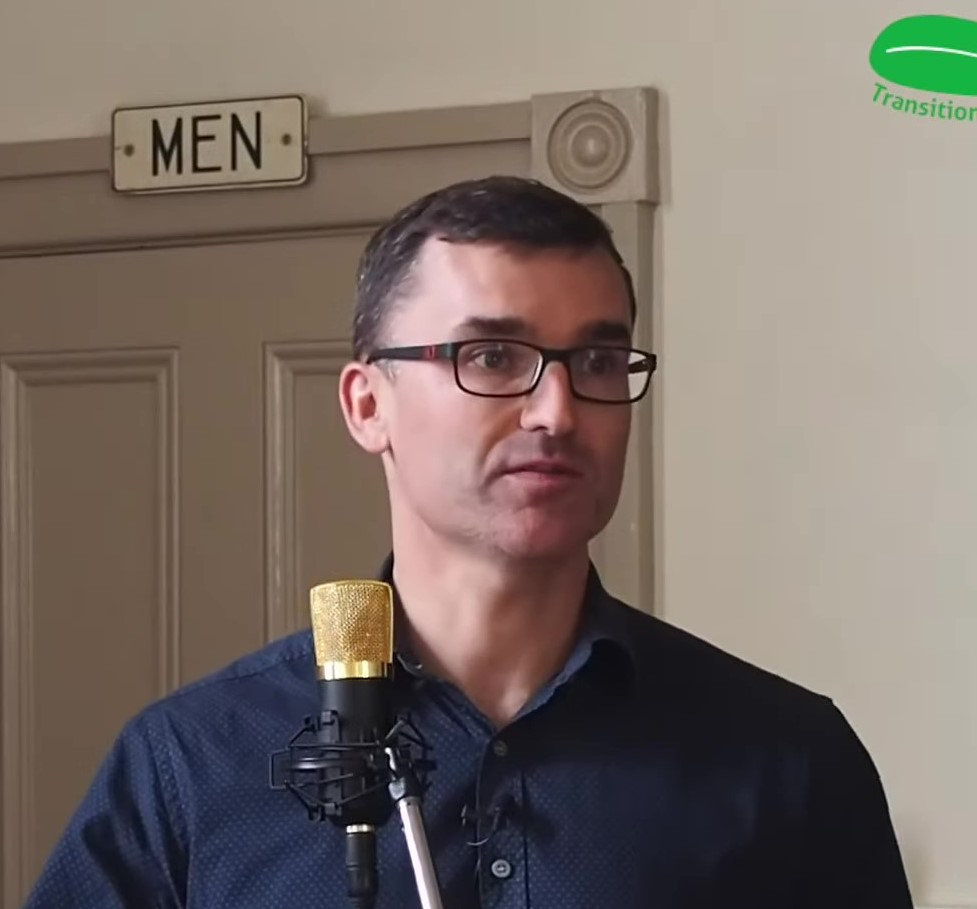
- Carey in 2017

Minister for Planning
- Incumbent
- Assumed office 8 June 2023
- Premier: Roger Cook
- Preceded by: Rita Saffioti

Minister for Housing
- Incumbent
- Assumed office 19 March 2021
- Premier: Mark McGowan; Roger Cook
- Preceded by: Peter Tinley

Minister for Lands
- Incumbent
- Assumed office 21 December 2021
- Premier: Mark McGowan; Roger Cook
- Preceded by: Tony Buti

Minister for Homelessness
- In office 21 December 2021 – 19 March 2025
- Premier: Mark McGowan; Roger Cook
- Preceded by: None
- Succeeded by: Matthew Swinbourn

Minister for Local Government
- In office 19 March 2021 – 8 June 2023
- Premier: Mark McGowan
- Preceded by: David Templeman
- Succeeded by: David Michael

Member of the Western Australian Legislative Assembly for Perth
- Incumbent
- Assumed office 11 March 2017
- Preceded by: Eleni Evangel

Mayor of the City of Vincent
- In office 19 October 2013 – 30 January 2017
- Preceded by: Alannah MacTiernan
- Succeeded by: Emma Cole

Personal details
- Born: 11 July 1974 (age 52) Perth, Western Australia, Australia
- Party: Labor
- Education: Murdoch University
- Website: www.johncareymla.com.au

John Newton Carey (born 11 July 1974) is an Australian politician and member of the Australian Labor Party. He has represented the seat of Perth in the Western Australian Legislative Assembly since 11 March 2017. Carey was elevated to Cabinet in March 2021 following Premier Mark McGowan’s historic re-election victory, taking on the portfolios of Housing and Local Government.

After Labor’s third successive landslide win in the 2025 state election, Premier Roger Cook appointed Carey as Minister for Planning and Lands, Housing and Works, and Health Infrastructure. He previously served as Mayor of the City of Vincent from 19 October 2013 to 30 January 2017.

== Early life and career ==
John Carey was born on 11 July 1974 in Perth, Western Australia, to Delys Carey and John William "Jack" Carey, a member of the 2/2nd Commando Squadron who served in the Battle of Timor during the Second World War. In 2001, Jack Carey was awarded the Medal of the Order of Australia for his contributions to veteran welfare and his support of the Timorese people through the 2/2nd Commando Association.

Carey attended Bateman Primary School and Corpus Christi College. He went on to Murdoch University, where he graduated with a Bachelor of Arts with first class honours, majoring in communications. During his time at university, he was the national president of the National Union of Students.

In 2004, Carey joined the Australian Labor Party. He worked as a political advisor for the governments of Geoff Gallop and Alan Carpenter. After the 2008 state election, Carey worked for five years as the director of the Kimberley Conservation Project for the Pew Environment Group, where he successfully campaigned for the creation of the Great Kimberley Marine Park. For two years, he also ran an event, party and wedding coordination business called Bailey and Carey.

Carey established Western Australia's first "town team", the Beaufort Street Network, and co-founded the Beaufort Street Festival. He also founded the Brain Tumour Association of WA after his mother was diagnosed with glioblastoma.

== City of Vincent ==
Carey was elected to the City of Vincent council in 2011. In his first term, he initiated a register for same-sex couples to register their relationship with the City of Vincent, in lieu of the federal government allowing same-sex marriage. He also criticised the state government's council merger plans, which would have resulted in the City of Vincent being split between the cities of Bayswater, Perth and Stirling. In 2013, he was elected mayor with 87.12% of the vote, succeeding Alannah MacTiernan, who had resigned as she had won the federal seat of Perth.

As Mayor of Vincent, Carey advocated for greater transparency and accountability in local government, writing and releasing a public discussion paper "Raising the Bar", and introduced a series of measures to enhance public reporting at the City of Vincent, including an online gifts register and WA's first contact with developers register.

During his tenure in 2016 with a new CEO at the helm and council, the City of Vincent was independently rated first among 25 councils, receiving an overall performance score of 82 out of 100, compared to 16th out of 18 councils in 2010. The Catalyse Community Scorecard surveys households across a local government area, and found the City of Vincent ranked highest in 18 out of 40 benchmarks, including place to live, governing organisation, and the city's leadership within the community.

== Parliament ==
In March 2016, Carey confirmed that he was seeking preselection as the Labor Party candidate for the seat of Perth in the Western Australian Legislative Assembly, the lower house of the Parliament of Western Australia. The seat had been won by the Liberal Party's Eleni Evangel at the previous election. He said that residents were bringing to him issues that he could not solve at a local government level. He was officially preselected on 8 March. In December 2016, Carey announced his resignation as Mayor effective 30 January 2017. Stepping down ahead of the state election enabled the mayoral by-election to be held with the already-scheduled by-election to replace retiring councillor Laine McDonald. At the 2017 state election on 11 March, Carey was elected as the member for Perth, winning 61.8% of the two-party-preferred vote and a two-party-preferred swing of 14.6%.

From 17 March 2017 to 19 March 2021, Carey was parliamentary secretary to Mark McGowan, who was the premier, minister for public sector management, minister for state development, jobs and trade, and minister for federal-state relations. From 3 August 2017 to 19 March 2021, he was also parliamentary secretary to Rita Saffioti, who was the minister for transport, minister for planning and minister for lands (until 13 December 2018).

In August 2017, Carey hosted the Perth City Summit, which over 350 residents, business operators and property owners attended. The purpose was to discuss and develop projects and plans to improve Perth. Among the summit's recommendations are for a new university campus to be created in the Perth central business district, for new cycling infrastructure to be constructed and to remove alfresco fees for businesses.

At the 2021 state election on 13 March, Carey was re-elected as the member for Perth, winning 79.3% of the two-party-preferred vote and a two-party-preferred swing of 16.6%. Since 19 March 2021, Carey has been the minister for housing and minister for local government, succeeding Peter Tinley and David Templeman respectively. Since 21 December 2021, Carey has also been the minister for lands, succeeding Tony Buti, and the minister for homelessness, a newly created ministry. Responsibility for homelessness was previously held by the minister for community services. The CEO of Shelter WA, the state's peak group for ending homelessness, said "we know Minister Carey has been a passionate champion for homelessness during his time as the Member for Perth." The departments, agencies and offices under Carey's responsibility are the Department of Communities, Department of Planning, Lands and Heritage, Department of Local Government, Sport and Cultural Industries, Landgate, DevelopmentWA and the Metropolitan Cemeteries Board.

On 10 November 2021, Carey announced major reforms to local government in Western Australia. The proposed changes include making local government elections have preferential voting like at state and federal elections, as opposed to the currently used method of first-past-the-post voting; making larger local governments have directly elected mayors or presidents, as opposed to them being elected by councillors; a mandatory caretaker period before elections; livestreaming of council meetings online and posting of recordings; the formation of a local government inspector to investigate and fix dysfunctional councils in an attempt to avoid the need for expensive enquiries; further define the roles and responsibilities of councillors and local government CEOs; and new rules for the number of councillors for each local government. Legislation for this, the Local Government Amendment Bill 2023, passed the Legislative Assembly on 24 March 2023 and has yet to pass the Legislative Council.

As Lands Minister, Carey was responsible for the passage of the Wittenoom Closure Bill, which passed in March 2022. This allowed the government to permanently close the former town of Wittenoom by compulsorily acquiring the remaining private properties and removing all infrastructure from the town. The town had been declared a contaminated site due to asbestos mining, but several people still lived there and visited there. In September 2022, the last resident was evicted.

Carey was appointed Minister for Planning in the Cook ministry, sworn in on 8 June 2023 following Mark McGowan's resignation and Roger Cook's elevation to premier. As part of the reshuffle the Local Government, the portfolio was handed to newly elevated Cabinet Member, David Michael.

Following the 2025 state election, Carey was sworn in by His Excellency the Governor of Western Australia, Chris Dawson APM, on 19 March 2025 as Minister for Planning and Lands; Housing and Works; and Health Infrastructure.

In the aftermath of WA Labor's third successive electoral landslide, Premier Roger Cook moved to consolidate his government's reform agenda with a wide-ranging Cabinet reshuffle. John Carey was appointed to two newly created portfolios: Works and Health Infrastructure. The establishment of Health Infrastructure was created to create greater focus on the delivery of major capital investments, among them, the new Women's and Babies Hospital to replace the ageing King Edward Memorial Hospital.

The Works portfolio was similarly carved out to provide centralised oversight of public infrastructure, aiming to bring coherence to the intersecting demands of housing, planning and construction, amid constraints with labour supply. The Health and Mental Health Portfolios passed to first-time minister Meredith Hammat.

== Political views ==
Carey is affiliated with the United Workers Union and is part of the Labor Left faction. He is a strong supporter of small business, and believes in reducing red tape for them.

== Personal life ==
Carey is openly gay and has been a visible advocate for LGBTQ+ inclusion in public life. His openness about his identity has contributed to greater visibility and representation within Western Australian politics. He has anonymously donated sperm for five children.

Civic offices
Preceded by Alannah MacTiernan	Mayor of Vincent; 19 October 2013 – 30 January 2017	Succeeded by Emma Cole
Western Australian Legislative Assembly
Preceded by Eleni Evangel	Member for Perth; 11 March 2017 – present	Incumbent
Political offices
Preceded by Rita Saffioti	Minister for Planning; 8 June 2023 – present	Incumbent
Preceded by Tony Buti	Minister for Lands; 21 December 2021 – present	Incumbent
Preceded by Peter Tinley	Minister for Housing; 19 March 2021 – present	Incumbent
New title	Minister for Homelessness; 21 December 2021 – present	Incumbent
Preceded by David Templeman	Minister for Local Government; 19 March 2021 – 8 June 2023	Succeeded by David Michael
