= Landgate =

Western Australian Land Information Authority

Agency overview
- Formed: 1 January 2007
- Preceding agencies: Department of Land Information; Department of Land Administration; Department of Lands & Surveys
- Jurisdiction: Government of Western Australia
- Headquarters: 1 Midland Square, Midland, Western Australia
- Minister responsible: John Carey, Lands
- Agency executive: Trish Scully, Chief Executive
- Website: www.landgate.wa.gov.au

Footnotes
- =

Landgate, also known as the Western Australian Land Information Authority, is an agency of the Government of Western Australia.

Formerly known as the Department of Land Information, the Department of Land Administration and the Department of Lands & Surveys, it is the statutory authority responsible for property and land information in Western Australia.

== Current activities ==
Former Landgate Logo

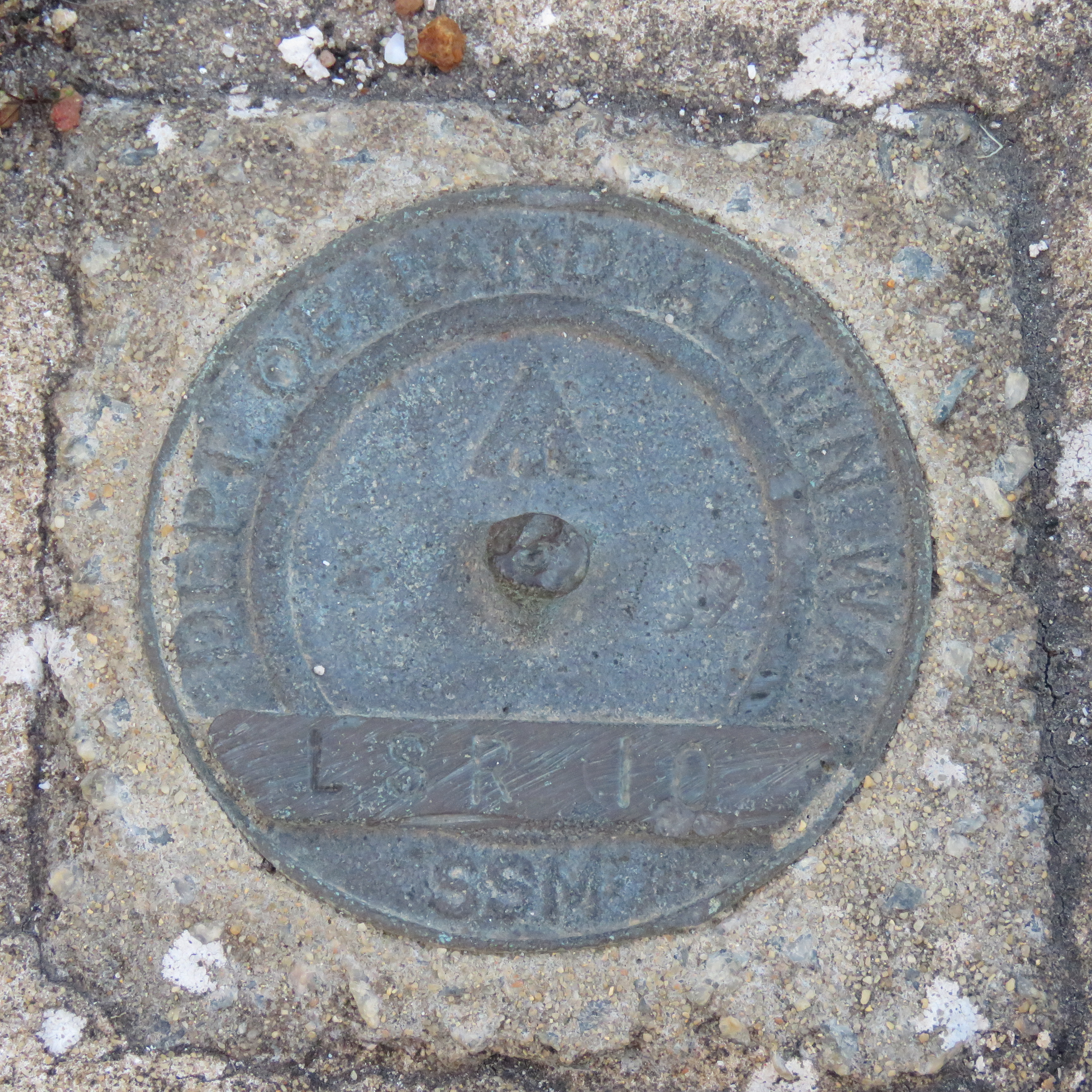
A Department of Land Administration land survey marker at Grigsons Lookout, Jurien Bay, a survey location dating back to 1875

Landgate maintains the official register of land ownership and survey information for the 2,645,600 km^{2} of Western Australia.

The authority provides a wide range of products and services such as Certificates of Title, Property Sales Reports, Survey Plans, aerial photography, satellite imagery, maps and data, and are responsible for valuing the State's land and property for government purposes.

=== Data Delivery ===
In order to deliver these services and provide context to the State's property interests, Landgate coordinates access to location data held across WA government departments through the Western Australian Land Information System. This information is made available through an open data platform called the Shared Location Information Platform, which is accessed through the WA Government's open data website, (DataWA). Landgate also manages the Capture WA program, which coordinates spatial imagery captures on behalf of all state and local government agencies in Western Australia in a bid to reduce costs and duplication.

Landgate no longer provides consultancy services in the areas of survey, valuation (government only), international relations, pastoral and rangelands, and native titles.

== See also ==
- Western Australian Land Information System
- Surveyor General of Western Australia
