= List of mayors of Vincent =

Between 1994 and 2011 the City of Vincent, in Perth, Western Australia was known as the Town of Vincent. The city is located on the edge of inner city Perth, Western Australia and includes surrounding suburbs. There have been seven mayors of Vincent: Jack Marks, John Hyde, Nick Catania, Alannah MacTiernan, John Carey, Emma Cole, and Alison Xamon. Hyde, Catania, MacTiernan and Carey have served as Labor Party members of the Western Australian Legislative Assembly—Hyde and Carey served as mayor before entering Parliament, while Catania and MacTiernan served after leaving the state parliament. Carey was elected to the seat of Perth at the 2017 state election. Xamon has served as an Australian Greens member of the Western Australian Legislative Council.

== Mayors ==
=== 1995−present ===
No.	Image	Mayor	Term start	Term end	Notes
1		Jack Marks	13 February 1995	1998	Previously City of Perth councillor
2		John Hyde	1999	2001	Member for Perth in Western Australian Parliament (2001–2013)
3		Nick Catania	2001	2011	Member for Balcatta in Western Australian Parliament (1989–1996)
4		Alannah MacTiernan	2011	2013	City of Perth councillor 1988–1994; Labor Member of the Western Australian Legislative Council for East Metropolitan 1993-1996; Member of the Western Australian Legislative Assembly for Armadale 1996-2010; elected for federal Division of Perth 2013
5		John Carey	2013	24 February 2017	City of Vincent councillor (2011–2013). Resigned to contest 2017 state election
6		Emma Cole	24 February 2017	21 October 2023	Did not seek re-election
7		Alison Xamon	21 October 2023	present	Member of Western Australian Legislative Council for East Metropolitan (2017–2021)

== Electoral results ==
=== 2023 ===
2023 Western Australian mayoral elections: Vincent
Party	Candidate	Votes	%	±%
Independent Greens	Alison Xamon	2,956	40.14	
Independent	Ron Alexander	2,438	33.11	
Independent	Suzanne Worner	1,374	18.66	
Independent	Amanda Madden	596	8.09	
Total formal votes		7,364	99.45	
Informal votes		41	0.55	
Turnout		7,405	28.34	
Two-candidate-preferred result
Independent Greens	Alison Xamon	3,757	56.30	
Independent	Ron Alexander	2,917	43.70	
Independent Greens gain from Independent Labor		Swing		
