= Minister for Planning (Western Australia) =

Minister for Planning of Government of Western Australia
- Incumbent; John Carey since 8 June 2023
- Department of Planning, Lands and Heritage (Western Australia)

Minister for Planning and Lands is a position in the Government of Western Australia, currently held by John Carey of the Labor Party. The position was first created after the 1953 state election, for the government of Albert Hawke, and has existed in every government since then. The minister is responsible for the state government's Department of Planning, Lands & Heritage, and takes advice and recommendations from the Western Australian Planning Commission.

== Titles ==
- 23 February 1953 – 3 March 1971: Minister for Town Planning
- 3 March 1971 – 12 October 1971: Minister for Decentralisation and Town Planning
- 12 October 1971 – 8 April 1974: Minister for Town Planning
- 8 April 1974 – 25 February 1983: Minister for Urban Development and Town Planning
- 25 February 1983 – 16 February 2001: Minister for Planning
- 16 February 2001 – 23 September 2008: Minister for Planning and Infrastructure
- 23 September 2008 – 19 March 2025: Minister for Planning
- 19 March 2025 – present: Minister for Planning and Lands

== List of ministers ==
Term start	Term end	Minister	Party
23 February 1953	1 November 1958	Gilbert Fraser	Labor
13 November 1958	2 April 1959	Frank Wise	Labor
2 April 1959	3 March 1971	Leslie Logan	Country
3 March 1971	6 July 1972	Herb Graham	Labor
6 July 1972	8 April 1974	Ron Davies	Labor
8 April 1974	25 August 1978	Cyril Rushton	Liberal
25 August 1978	25 February 1983	June Craig	Liberal
25 February 1983	23 December 1983	David Parker	Labor
23 December 1983	20 December 1984	Peter Dowding	Labor
20 December 1984	28 February 1989	Bob Pearce	Labor
28 February 1989	19 February 1990	Pam Beggs	Labor
19 February 1990	5 February 1991	Kay Hallahan	Labor
5 February 1991	16 February 1993	David Smith	Labor
16 February 1993	9 January 1997	Richard Lewis	Liberal
9 January 1997	16 February 2001	Graham Kierath	Liberal
16 February 2001	23 September 2008	Alannah MacTiernan	Labor
23 September 2008	31 March 2016	John Day	Liberal
31 March 2016	17 March 2017	Donna Faragher	Liberal
17 March 2017	8 June 2023	Rita Saffioti	Labor
8 June 2023	incumbent	John Carey	Labor

== See also ==
- Minister for Heritage (Western Australia)
- Minister for Housing (Western Australia)
- Minister for Lands (Western Australia)
- Minister for State Development (Western Australia)
- Minister for Transport (Western Australia)
