= Beaufort Street Festival =

Community festival in Perth, Western Australia

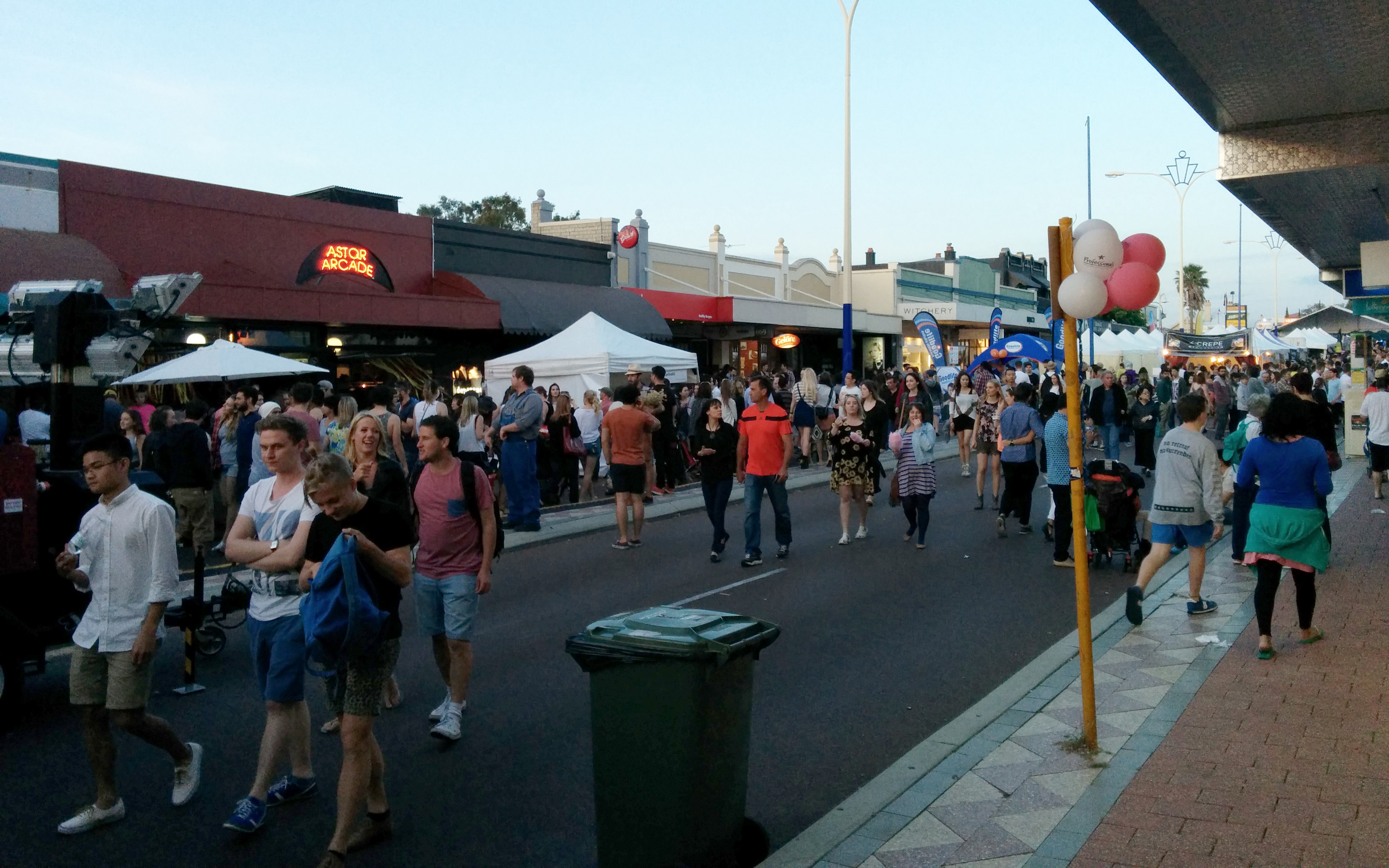
- Beaufort Street Festival in 2014
- Status: Active
- Genre: Street festival
- Frequency: Annually
- Venue: Beaufort Street
- Locations: Highgate/Mount Lawley, Western Australia
- Coordinates: 31.936°S 115.870°E
- Country: Australia
- Years active: 2010–2015
- Founder: Beaufort Street Network
- Attendance: 150,000 (2014)
- Budget: A$450,000
- Organiser: JumpClimb Events
- Member: Beaufort Street Network

The Beaufort Street Festival was an annual community street festival in Perth, Western Australia that took place each November along Beaufort Street and other nearby streets. The event ran five times from 2010 to 2015 and traversed the suburbs of Highgate and Mount Lawley.

The event featured various programs, including music, family activities, food, fashion and art. In 2014, over 150,000 people attended the festival, making it one of Perth's largest street festivals at that time.

In 2016, the Beaufort Street Network community group, which organised the event, announced the festival would "take a break" due to concerns about the growing numbers of attendees.
