= Department for Child Protection (Western Australia) =

Former government department of Western Australia

Department of Child Protection
Agency overview
- Formed: 1 July 2007
- Preceding agencies: Department for Community Development; Department for Family and Children's Services
- Dissolved: 1 July 2017
- Superseding agency: Department of Communities
- Jurisdiction: Government of Western Australia
- Website: www.dcp.wa.gov.au

The Department for Child Protection was part of the Government of Western Australia.

It was created in response to a critical review of the Department of Community Development in January 2007. At the time of its establishment, the government also mandated reporting of child sexual abuse.

In July 2017, the department was amalgamated with the Department of Housing, the Department of Local Government and Communities and the Disability Services Commission to form the Department of Communities.

== Responsibilities ==
The department administers acts and regulations which include the following:

- Adoption Act 1994
- Adoption Regulations 1995
- Children and Community Services Act 2004
- Children and Community Services Regulations 2006
- Parental Support and Responsibility Act 2008
- Parental Support and Responsibility Regulations 2009
- Working with Children (Criminal Record Checking) Act 2004
- Working with Children (Criminal Record Checking) Regulations 2005.

The Children and Community Services Act 2004, came into operation on 1 March 2006. The department came into existence on 1 July 2007.

The legislation that governs the department's three service areas:

- Supporting children and young people in the chief executive officer's care.
- Protecting children and young people from abuse.
- Supporting individuals and families at risk or in crisis.

The department also has the capacity for information sharing where it benefits child protection

== Former agencies ==
(Other agencies might have had overlap in relation to Aboriginal children, but these are the main names

- 1908 – 1917 Public Charities and State Children's Department.
- 1917 – 1927 State Children's Department.
- 1927 – 1972 Child Welfare Department.
- 1972 – 1985 Department for Community Welfare
- 1985 – 1992 Department for Community Services
- 1992 – 1995 Department for Community Development
- 1995 – 2001 Department for Family and Children's Services
- 2001 – 2007 Department for Community Development

== See also ==
- Aboriginal child protection#Australia
- Protecting Victoria's Vulnerable Children Inquiry
