= Department of Planning, Lands and Heritage =

Department of government of Western Australia

Government Department overview
- Formed: 28 April 2017
- Preceding agencies: Department of Planning; Department of Lands; Heritage Council of Western Australia; Department of Aboriginal Affairs
- Jurisdiction: Western Australia
- Headquarters: Gordon Stephenson House, 140 William Street, Perth
- Employees: 865 (2018)
- Annual budget: $222 million (2023)
- Ministers responsible: John Carey; David Templeman; Stephen Dawson
- Government Department executive: Anthony Kannis, Director General
- Child agencies: Western Australian Planning Commission; Heritage Council of Western Australia; Aboriginal Lands Trust; Pastoral Lands Board; Office of the Government Architect; Fremantle Prison; Whiteman Park
- Website: www.dplh.wa.gov.au

The Department of Planning, Lands and Heritage (DPLH) is the department of the Government of Western Australia responsible for planning and managing all land use and heritage considerations within the state. The department was formed on 28 April 2017 as a merger of the former departments of Planning, Lands Management, the Heritage Council and the heritage and land management functions of the former Department of Aboriginal Affairs.

== Background ==
Political pressure for new legislation on Town Planning had been part of the post war Western Australia and led to the creation of the Town Planning Department in 1954.

The department operated under the same name with varying responsibilities until the establishment of the Department of Planning and Urban Development in September 1989. The department was renamed the Ministry for Planning in March 1995.

On 1 July 2001 the department was merged with the Departments of Transport and Land Administration under a single minister as the Department of Planning and Infrastructure. The purpose of the amalgamation was to deliver integrated land use and transport infrastructure planning — however the experiment was short-lived. On 1 July 2009 the department was superseded by the Department of Planning and the Department of Transport.

In 2017, a departmental reorganisation led to the consolidation of all state government land use and heritage responsibilities under a single Department of Planning, Lands and Heritage. The department currently exercises various planning decision-making responsibilities under delegation from the Western Australian Planning Commission.

In May 2021, the department was one of eight Western Australian Government departments to receive a new Director General with Jodi Cant being appointed to the role effective from 31 May 2021 after her predecessor, Gail McGowan, had retired.

== Functions and responsibilities ==
- Western Australian Planning Commission
- State Planning Framework
- Development Assessment Panels
- Heritage
- Office of the Government Architect
- Pastoral Lands Board
- Aboriginal Lands Trust
- Fremantle Prison
- Whiteman Park

== Ministers ==
The department supports four ministerial positions:

- Minister for Planning
- Minister for Heritage
- Minister for Aboriginal Affairs; Lands

== See also ==
- Metronet
