= Alison Xamon =

Australian politician

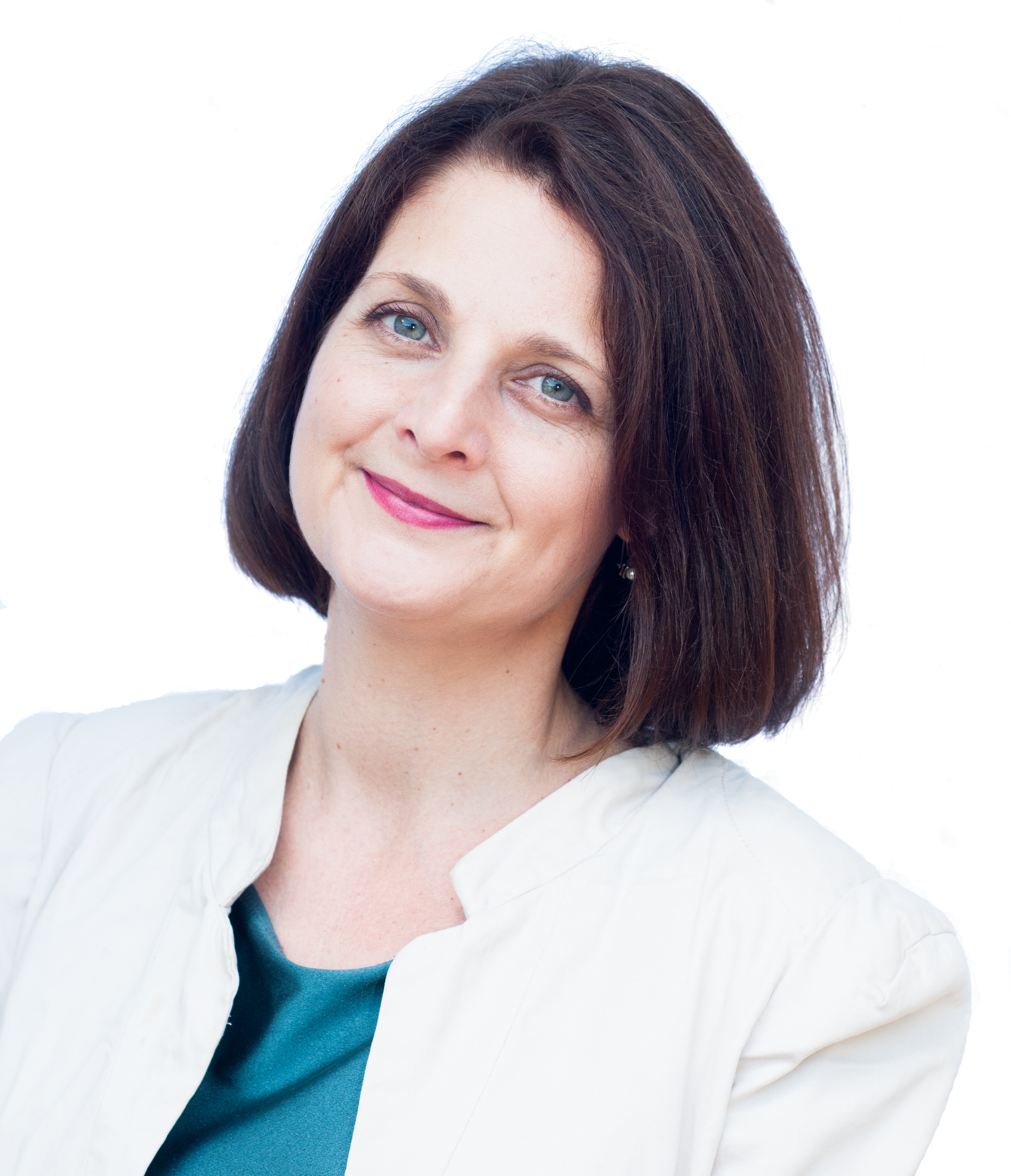

7th Mayor of Vincent
- Incumbent
- Assumed office 21 October 2023
- Preceded by: Emma Cole

Member of the Western Australian Legislative Council for North Metropolitan
- In office 22 May 2017 – 21 May 2021
- Preceded by: Giz Watson

Member of the Western Australian Legislative Council for East Metropolitan
- In office 22 May 2009 – 21 May 2013
- Preceded by: First Greens member
- Succeeded by: Tim Clifford

Personal details
- Born: 8 June 1969 (age 57) Mundaring, Western Australia
- Party: Greens
- Education: Murdoch University (BA, LLB)
- Website: alisonxamon.au

Alison Marie Xamon (born 8 June 1969) is an Australian politician currently serving as the Mayor of the City of Vincent, having been elected on 21 October 2023 for a four-year term. Prior to her mayoralty, Xamon represented the East Metropolitan Region in the Western Australian Legislative Council from 2009 to 2013 and the North Metropolitan Region from 2017 to 2021 as a member of the Greens (WA).

== Early life ==
Xamon was born in Mundaring, Western Australia

Xamon studied law and arts at Murdoch University, where she served as Education Vice President and then Guild President for the Murdoch University Student Guild.

After university, Xamon worked in the union movement for various white- and blue-collar unions, including the Australian Nurses Federation, the State School Teachers' Union of Western Australia, and the Communications, Electricians and Plumbers Union. In her time in the union movement, Alison worked as an Organizer, Industrial Officer, Women's Officer, and Equal Opportunity specialist.

She then went on to work as a lawyer, with an interest in both public interest law and the right for people to access justice. She also sat on numerous boards within the community law and social justice sectors.

From 2007 to 2008 Xamon, was the National Convenor of the Australian Greens.

== Political career ==
She was elected to parliament at the 2008 state election as a Greens member of the Western Australian Legislative Council representing East Metropolitan Region. Xamon introduced six private members bills during her term in parliament.

At the March 2013 Western Australian election, she was not re-elected.

Post-parliament, Xamon worked as an advocate for mental health and suicide prevention. She was elected as the President of the WA Association for Mental Health, the vice-chair of Community Mental Health Australia, and the Board of Mental Health Australia.

Xamon was also appointed to the WA Ministerial Council for Suicide Prevention, and as the inaugural Co-Lead of the Department of Health Statewide Mental Health Network.

Xamon was re-elected to the Legislative Council representing the North Metropolitan Region at the 2017 election. Her term began on 22 May 2017. She was defeated in 2021.

In the October 2023 local government elections, Xamon was elected as mayor of the City of Vincent, with 40 percent of the vote. She ran as an Independent Greens candidate, without an official endorsement from her party.

== Political views and advocacy ==
Alison Xamon is a passionate advocate for social justice, mental health, and environmental sustainability. Throughout her political career, she has championed policies aimed at creating a fairer and more inclusive society.

Xamon has consistently advocated for the rights of marginalized communities, including refugees, prisoners, and individuals with mental health issues. She has worked extensively in the community law and social justice sectors, serving on numerous boards and committees. Her commitment to human rights is reflected in her legislative efforts and public statements.

A significant portion of Xamon's advocacy has focused on mental health and suicide prevention. She has held leadership roles in organizations such as the WA Association for Mental Health and Community Mental Health Australia. Xamon has been a vocal proponent for increased funding and support for mental health services, emphasizing the need for a compassionate and accessible mental health system.
