= Albert A. Marks Jr. =

American businessperson

- Born: Philadelphia, U.S.
- Education: Williams College; University of Pennsylvania
- Occupation: Businessperson
- Known for: Miss America Pageant

Albert A. Marks Jr. was an American businessperson who was the head of Miss America Pageant.

== Biography ==
Marks was born in Philadelphia, U.S. He studied at Williams College and the University of Pennsylvania.

Marks also served in the U.S. Air Force and retired as lieutenant colonel. He also served as a president of the Chamber of Commerce of Atlantic City.

In 1952, he joined the Miss America Pageant and served as its chairperson and executive producer for about twenty-five years. He was known as "Mr. Miss America".
