= Protecting Victoria's Vulnerable Children Inquiry =

The Protecting Victoria's Vulnerable Children Inquiry was an inquiry ordered by the Australian Government of Victoria in 2011. The inquiry was conducted by a panel of three members and was asked to “investigate systemic problems in Victoria’s child protection system and make recommendations to strengthen and improve the protection and support of vulnerable young Victorians.”

The Panel comprised the Honourable Philip Cummins AMy, Professor Emeritus Dorothy Scott OAM, and Mr Bill Scales AO.

The Inquiry was announced in the Parliament of Victoria on 31 January 2011. The Report of the Inquiry was handed to the Minister for Community Services on 27 January 2012 and tabled in the Parliament by the Minister, the Honourable Mary Wooldridge, on 28 February.

== Recommendations ==
The Panel made 90 recommendations of measures to reduce the incidence and negative impact of child abuse and neglect in Victoria in ten major system reform areas.
