= Jack Marks (politician) =

Australian politician and trade union official

1st Mayor of Vincent
- In office 1995–1998
- Succeeded by: John Hyde

Personal details
- Born: 20 December 1924
- Died: 2 October 1998 (aged 73)

Military service
- Allegiance: Australia
- Branch/service: RAAF
- Years of service: 1943–1946
- Rank: Warrant Officer

Albert John Marks, best known as Jack Marks (20 December 1924 – 2 October 1998) was an Australian politician and trade union official.

== Early life ==
Marks was born in 1924 in the western suburbs of Perth, Western Australia. His father, also Albert Marks, was a shop manager.

Marks served in the Royal Australian Air Force between 1943 and 1946.

== Political career ==
Marks was elected as a councillor of the City of Perth in 1988. He served as deputy to Lord Mayor Reg Withers in 1993.

In 1995 Marks became the first mayor of the Town of Vincent when commissioners that had replaced Council when the City of Perth was split were, in turn, replaced by an elected Council in May 1995.
