= Murder of Daniel Valerio =

1990 murder of an Australian child

Daniel Valerio
- Born: Daniel Phillip Deneel Apollo Valerio; 21 April 1988
- Died: 8 September 1990 (aged 2)
- Cause of death: Systematic prolonged mental and physical torture
- Resting place: Rye Cemetery, buried with maternal grandmother
- Known for: Circumstances of death
- Relatives: Cheryle Butcher (mother); Michael Valerio (father); Candice (sibling); Ben (sibling); Aaron (sibling)

Daniel Valerio (21 April 1988 – 8 September 1990) was an Australian boy who was beaten to death on 8 September 1990 by Paul Aiton, his mother's boyfriend at the time. His death caused outrage amongst the public and led to the introduction of mandatory reporting of suspected child abuse in Victoria.

Aiton was convicted of murder charges and sentenced to 22 years in prison, eligible for parole in 2011.
