= Department of Communities (Western Australia) =

Western Australian government department

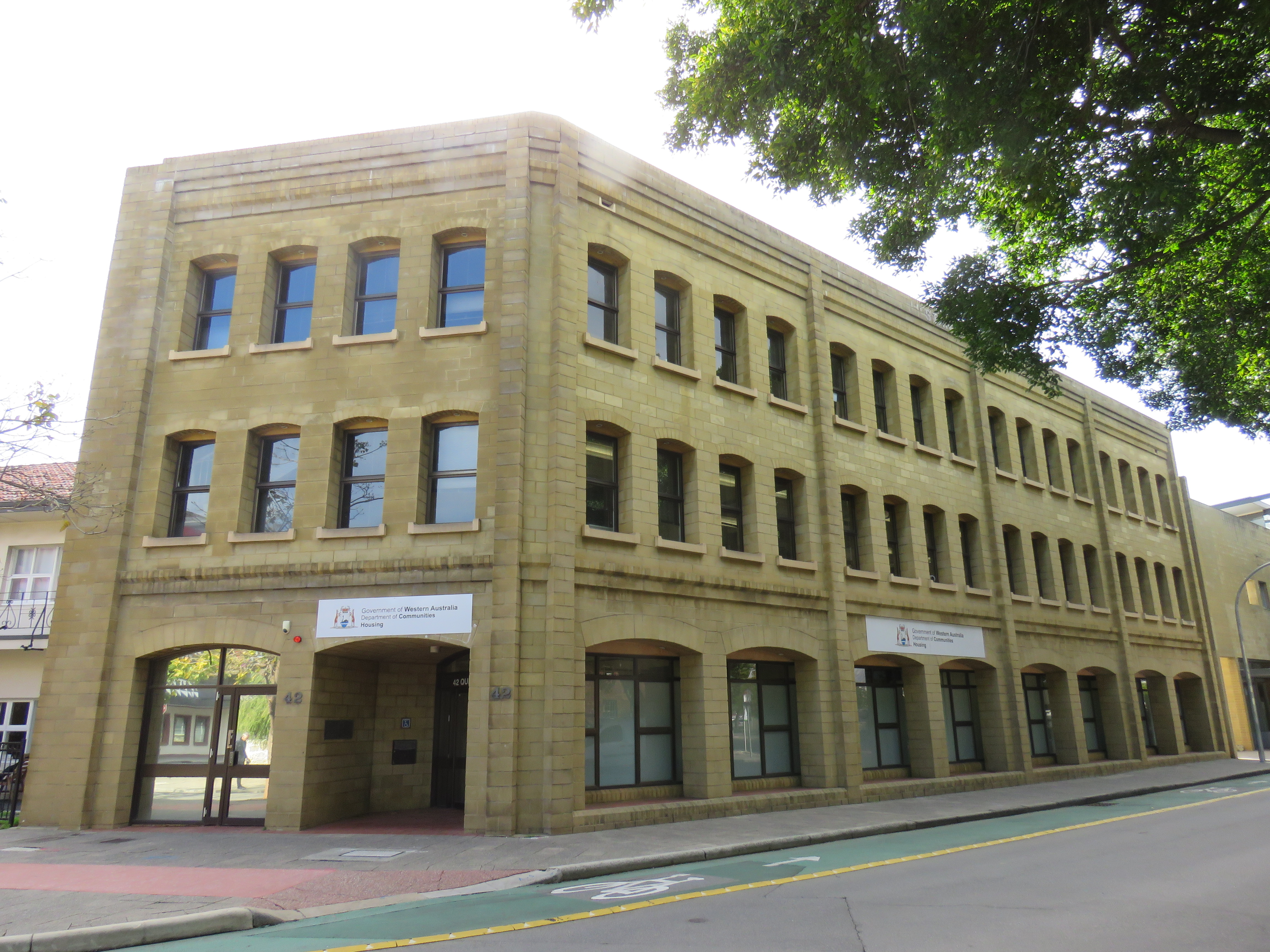
- The department's office at 42 Queen Street, Fremantle (Stan Parks House)

Department overview
- Formed: 1 July 2017
- Preceding agencies: Child Protection and Family Support; Housing; Local Government and Communities
- Jurisdiction: Government of Western Australia
- Headquarters: 5 Newman Court, Fremantle
- Employees: 6,033
- Department executive: Mike Rowe, Director General
- Website: www.wa.gov.au/organisation/department-of-communities

The Department of Communities is a department of the Government of Western Australia. The department was formed on 1 July 2017, out of the former Department of Child Protection and Family Support, Department of Local Government and Communities, Department of Housing and the Disability Services Commission.

A restructuring of the Western Australian government departments was part of Mark McGowan's election campaign and, in the month after taking office, the number of government departments was reduced from 41 to 25.

The department is responsible for the portfolios of child protection, community services, disability services, housing, prevention of family and domestic violence, remote Aboriginal communities, seniors and ageing, volunteering, women's interests and young people, children and families.

In the reporting period of 2020–21, the department had 5,344 children in its care, of which 57 percent were Indigenous.

In May 2021, the department was one of eight Western Australian Government departments to receive a new Director General with Mike Rowe being appointed to the role effective from 31 May 2021.
