= Results of the 1980 Western Australian state election (Legislative Assembly) =

Western Australian state election, 23 February 1980 Legislative Assembly << 1977–1983 >>
Enrolled voters	689,066^{[1]}				
Votes cast	609,418		Turnout	85.27%	–5.51%
Informal votes	21,449		Informal	3.52%	+0.34%
Summary of votes by party
Party	Primary votes	%	Swing	Seats	Change
Liberal	257,218	43.75%	–5.60%	26	– 1
Labor	270,165	45.95%	+1.73%	23	+ 1
National Country	25,260	4.30%	+1.89%	3	± 0
National	17,411	2.96%	+0.09%	3	± 0
Democrats	11,513	1.96%	+1.96%	0	± 0
Socialist	1,527	0.26%	+0.26%	0	± 0
Progress	1,041	0.18%	–0.27%	0	± 0
Independent	3,834	0.65%	+0.05%	0	± 0
Total	587,969			55	
Two-party-preferred
Liberal/NCP	311,239	50.97%	–3.73%		
Labor	299,347	49.03%	+3.73%		

This is a list of electoral district results of the 1980 Western Australian election.

== Results by electoral district ==
=== Albany ===
1980 Western Australian state election: Albany
Party	Candidate	Votes	%	±%
Liberal	Leo Watt	4,236	57.7	−5.2
Labor	Ronald Bowe	2,606	35.5	−1.6
Progress	Douglas Joyce	500	6.8	+6.8
Total formal votes		7,342	96.5	−1.0
Informal votes		265	3.5	+1.0
Turnout		7,607	91.2	−2.0
Two-party-preferred result
Liberal	Leo Watt	4,586	62.5	−0.4
Labor	Ronald Bowe	2,756	37.5	+0.4
Liberal hold		Swing	−0.4	

=== Ascot ===
1980 Western Australian state election: Ascot
Party	Candidate	Votes	%	±%
Labor	Mal Bryce	8,184	62.1	+3.1
Liberal	Alam Richardson	4,991	37.9	−3.1
Total formal votes		13,175	95.0	−0.8
Informal votes		696	5.0	+0.8
Turnout		13,871	88.5	−2.3
Labor hold		Swing	+3.1	

=== Avon ===
1980 Western Australian state election: Avon
Party	Candidate	Votes	%	±%
Labor	Ken McIver	3,913	55.4	+1.6
Liberal	Julian Stanwix	2,124	30.1	−16.1
National Country	Allan Baxter	1,021	14.5	+14.5
Total formal votes		7,058	97.0	−0.7
Informal votes		219	3.0	+0.7
Turnout		7,277	92.0	−1.8
Two-party-preferred result
Labor	Ken McIver	4,005	56.7	+2.9
Liberal	Julian Stanwix	3,053	43.3	−2.9
Labor hold		Swing	+2.9	

=== Balcatta ===
1980 Western Australian state election: Balcatta
Party	Candidate	Votes	%	±%
Labor	Brian Burke	10,709	68.7	+7.4
Liberal	John Bamford	4,869	31.3	−7.4
Total formal votes		15,578	96.0	−0.4
Informal votes		650	4.0	+0.4
Turnout		16,228	86.9	−3.1
Labor hold		Swing	+7.4	

=== Bunbury ===
1980 Western Australian state election: Bunbury
Party	Candidate	Votes	%	±%
Liberal	John Sibson	4,087	48.7	−5.8
Labor	Phil Smith	3,813	45.5	0.0
Democrats	Donald Stewart	483	5.8	+5.8
Total formal votes		8,383	97.5	−0.9
Informal votes		217	2.5	+0.9
Turnout		8,600	90.8	−1.9
Two-party-preferred result
Liberal	John Sibson	4,304	51.3	−3.2
Labor	Phil Smith	4,079	48.7	+3.2
Liberal hold		Swing	−3.2	

=== Canning ===
1980 Western Australian state election: Canning
Party	Candidate	Votes	%	±%
Labor	Tom Bateman	10,025	58.5	+5.4
Liberal	Jack Courtis	7,109	41.5	−5.4
Total formal votes		17,134	96.2	−0.3
Informal votes		675	3.8	+0.3
Turnout		17,809	88.3	−1.9
Labor hold		Swing	+5.4	

=== Clontarf ===
1980 Western Australian state election: Clontarf
Party	Candidate	Votes	%	±%
Liberal	Tony Williams	8,052	53.9	−3.7
Labor	Robert Holland	6,887	46.1	+3.7
Total formal votes		14,939	96.8	+0.1
Informal votes		490	3.2	−0.1
Turnout		15,429	88.9	−3.5
Liberal hold		Swing	−3.7	

=== Cockburn ===
1980 Western Australian state election: Cockburn
Party	Candidate	Votes	%	±%
Labor	Don Taylor	10,173	73.1	+5.6
Liberal	Herbert Fancott	3,748	26.9	−5.6
Total formal votes		13,921	95.2	−1.3
Informal votes		706	4.8	+1.3
Turnout		14,627	89.4	−1.5
Labor hold		Swing	+5.6	

=== Collie ===
1980 Western Australian state election: Collie
Party	Candidate	Votes	%	±%
Labor	Tom Jones	unopposed		
Labor hold		Swing		

=== Cottesloe ===
1980 Western Australian state election: Cottesloe
Party	Candidate	Votes	%	±%
Liberal	Bill Hassell	7,191	55.2	−4.5
Labor	Richard Grounds	5,842	44.8	+4.5
Total formal votes		13,033	97.7	0.0
Informal votes		309	2.3	0.0
Turnout		13,342	87.0	−2.5
Liberal hold		Swing	−4.5	

=== Dale ===
1980 Western Australian state election: Dale
Party	Candidate	Votes	%	±%
Liberal	Cyril Rushton	4,098	53.3	−3.9
Labor	David Carlson	3,585	46.7	+3.9
Total formal votes		7,683	97.0	+0.1
Informal votes		239	3.0	−0.1
Turnout		7,922	89.9	−1.0
Liberal hold		Swing	−3.9	

=== Darling Range ===
1980 Western Australian state election: Darling Range
Party	Candidate	Votes	%	±%
Liberal	George Spriggs	4,019	54.2	−9.8
Labor	William O'Brien	2,390	32.2	−3.8
Democrats	Eric Synnerdahl	1,010	13.6	+13.6
Turnout		7,419	96.3	+0.7
Informal votes		283	3.7	−0.7
Turnout		7,702	88.4	−1.8
Two-party-preferred result
Liberal	George Spriggs	4,524	61.0	−3.0
Labor	William O'Brien	2,895	39.0	+3.0
Liberal hold		Swing	−3.0	

=== Dianella ===
1980 Western Australian state election: Dianella
Party	Candidate	Votes	%	±%
Labor	Keith Wilson	9,943	62.2	+7.9
Liberal	Graham Pittaway	6,033	37.8	−7.9
Total formal votes		15,976	96.6	0.0
Informal votes		561	3.4	0.0
Turnout		16,537	89.2	−2.4
Labor hold		Swing	+7.9	

=== East Melville ===
1980 Western Australian state election: East Melville
Party	Candidate	Votes	%	±%
Liberal	Anthony Trethowan	unopposed		
Liberal hold		Swing		

=== Floreat ===
1980 Western Australian state election: Floreat
Party	Candidate	Votes	%	±%
Liberal	Andrew Mensaros	9,188	64.4	−6.8
Labor	Dorothy Anderson	3,658	25.6	+1.6
Democrats	Desmond Wooding	1,422	10.0	+10.0
Total formal votes		14,268	98.1	−0.3
Informal votes		276	1.9	+0.3
Turnout		14,544	91.0	−1.7
Two-party-preferred result
Liberal	Andrew Mensaros	9,899	69.4	−4.2
Labor	Dorothy Anderson	4,369	30.6	+4.2
Liberal hold		Swing	−4.2	

=== Fremantle ===
1980 Western Australian state election: Fremantle
Party	Candidate	Votes	%	±%
Labor	David Parker	7,739	57.5	−6.8
Liberal	James Miorada	3,978	29.5	−6.2
Socialist Labour	Angelo Lopez	766	5.7	+5.7
Independent	Christopher Mayhew	547	4.1	+4.1
Communist	Victor Slater	438	3.3	+3.3
Total formal votes		13,468	92.7	−1.6
Informal votes		1,060	7.3	+1.6
Turnout		14,528	87.0	−3.5
Two-party-preferred result
Labor	David Parker	9,097	67.5	+3.2
Liberal	James Miorada	4,371	32.5	−3.2
Labor hold		Swing	+3.2	

=== Gascoyne ===
1980 Western Australian state election: Gascoyne
Party	Candidate	Votes	%	±%
Liberal	Ian Laurance	2,015	61.6	−7.9
Labor	Robert Price	1,183	36.1	+9.6
Independent	Robert Phillips	75	2.3	−1.7
Total formal votes		3,273	97.2	+0.1
Informal votes		95	2.8	−0.1
Turnout		3,368	87.7	−1.7
Two-party-preferred result
Liberal	Ian Laurance	2,052	62.7	−8.9
Labor	Robert Price	1,221	37.3	+8.9
Liberal hold		Swing	−8.9	

=== Geraldton ===
1980 Western Australian state election: Geraldton
Party	Candidate	Votes	%	±%
Labor	Jeff Carr	4,654	58.7	+4.4
Liberal	Joseph Ricupero	2,994	37.8	−2.8
Progress	Paul Galbraith	279	3.5	−1.6
Total formal votes		7,927	97.5	−0.5
Informal votes		207	2.5	+0.5
Turnout		8,134	89.5	−1.7
Two-party-preferred result
Labor	Jeff Carr	4,738	59.8	+4.2
Liberal	Joseph Ricupero	3,189	40.2	−4.2
Labor hold		Swing	+4.2	

=== Gosnells ===
1980 Western Australian state election: Gosnells
Party	Candidate	Votes	%	±%
Labor	Bob Pearce	9,934	54.8	+5.9
Liberal	Nancye Jones	7,268	40.1	−7.8
Independent	Gordon Stapp	930	5.1	+1.9
Total formal votes		18,132	95.6	−0.4
Informal votes		831	4.4	+0.4
Turnout		18,963	89.2	−2.3
Two-party-preferred result
Labor	Bob Pearce	10,399	57.4	+6.6
Liberal	Nancye Jones	7,733	42.6	−6.6
Labor hold		Swing	+6.6	

=== Greenough ===
1980 Western Australian state election: Greenough
Party	Candidate	Votes	%	±%
Liberal	Reg Tubby	4,429	54.6	−10.0
National Country	Gordon Garratt	1,508	18.6	+18.6
Labor	Edward Clarkson	1,321	16.3	−2.3
National	Michael Bell	589	7.3	+7.3
Progress	William Thomson	262	3.2	−13.6
Total formal votes		8,109	96.9	−0.7
Informal votes		259	3.1	+0.7
Turnout		8,368	90.5	−2.1
Two-party-preferred result
Liberal	Reg Tubby	6,440	79.4	+2.2
Labor	Edward Clarkson	1,669	20.6	−2.2
Liberal hold		Swing	+2.2	

=== Kalamunda ===
1980 Western Australian state election: Kalamunda
Party	Candidate	Votes	%	±%
Liberal	Ian Thompson	5,042	59.5	−9.1
Labor	Kay Hallahan	2,594	30.6	−0.8
Democrats	Elizabeth Capill	837	9.9	+9.9
Total formal votes		8,473	97.2	−0.4
Informal votes		243	2.8	+0.4
Turnout		8,716	89.5	−1.0
Two-party-preferred result
Liberal	Ian Thompson	5,460	64.4	−4.2
Labor	Kay Hallahan	3,013	35.6	+4.2
Liberal hold		Swing	−4.2	

=== Kalgoorlie ===
1980 Western Australian state election: Kalgoorlie
Party	Candidate	Votes	%	±%
Labor	Ted Evans	4,109	64.5	+2.5
Liberal	Douglas Daws	2,264	35.5	+3.9
Total formal votes		6,373	94.8	−1.4
Informal votes		346	5.2	+1.4
Turnout		6,719	86.1	−3.0
Labor hold		Swing	+0.9	

=== Karrinyup ===
1980 Western Australian state election: Karrinyup
Party	Candidate	Votes	%	±%
Liberal	Jim Clarko	9,284	58.5	−2.5
Labor	Evan McKenzie	6,597	41.5	+2.5
Total formal votes		15,881	97.5	0.0
Informal votes		406	2.5	0.0
Turnout		16,287	88.8	−2.8
Liberal hold		Swing	−2.5	

=== Katanning ===
1980 Western Australian state election: Katanning
Party	Candidate	Votes	%	±%
National Country	Dick Old	5,501	79.3	+6.4
National	Arnold Bilney	1,433	20.7	+20.7
Total formal votes		6,934	97.4	−0.4
Informal votes		187	2.6	+0.4
Turnout		7,121	91.8	−2.6
National Country hold		Swing	N/A	

=== Kimberley ===
1980 Western Australian state election: Kimberley
Party	Candidate	Votes	%	±%
Labor	Ernie Bridge	2,656	56.1	+9.2
Liberal	Alan Ridge	1,902	40.2	−9.5
Independent	Josephine Boyle	173	3.7	+3.7
Total formal votes		4,731	95.9	+4.1
Informal votes		201	4.1	−4.1
Turnout		4,932	81.5	+0.4
Two-party-preferred result
Labor	Ernie Bridge	2,742	58.0	+9.3
Liberal	Alan Ridge	1,989	42.0	−9.3
Labor gain from Liberal		Swing	+9.3	

=== Maylands ===
1980 Western Australian state election: Maylands
Party	Candidate	Votes	%	±%
Labor	John Harman	8,454	60.2	+5.6
Liberal	John Urquhart	5,583	39.8	−5.6
Total formal votes		14,037	95.6	−0.7
Informal votes		650	4.4	+0.7
Turnout		14,687	86.5	−3.7
Labor hold		Swing	+5.6	

=== Melville ===
1980 Western Australian state election: Melville
Party	Candidate	Votes	%	±%
Labor	Barry Hodge	8,972	62.8	+3.0
Liberal	Geoffrey Baldock	4,661	32.6	−7.6
Democrats	James Dunlevy	663	4.6	+4.6
Total formal votes		14,296	96.8	+0.1
Informal votes		470	3.2	−0.1
Turnout		14766	90.4	−1.8
Two-party-preferred result
Labor	Barry Hodge	9,303	65.1	+5.3
Liberal	Geoffrey Baldock	4,993	34.9	−5.3
Labor hold		Swing	+5.3	

=== Merredin ===
1980 Western Australian state election: Merredin
Party	Candidate	Votes	%	±%
National	Hendy Cowan	5,111	70.6	+70.6
Liberal	Norman Oates	1,070	14.8	−4.7
National Country	Edith Towers	1,061	14.7	−42.3
Total formal votes		7,242	97.3	−0.4
Informal votes		204	2.7	+0.4
Turnout		7,446	91.6	−0.9
Two-candidate-preferred result
National	Hendy Cowan	5,323	73.5	+73.5
Liberal	Norman Oates	1,919	26.5	+26.5
National gain from National Country		Swing	N/A	

=== Moore ===
1980 Western Australian state election: Moore
Party	Candidate	Votes	%	±%
National Country	Bert Crane	4,536	48.6	+4.1
Labor	John Halden	2,144	23.0	+1.9
Liberal	Michael Flanagan	2,113	22.6	−11.8
National	John Trewin	536	5.8	+5.8
Total formal votes		9,329	97.3	+0.7
Informal votes		263	2.7	−0.7
Turnout		9,592	90.4	−1.5
Two-party-preferred result
National Country	Bert Crane	6,823	73.1	−2.4
Labor	John Halden	2,506	26.9	+2.4
National Country hold		Swing	−2.4	

=== Morley ===
1980 Western Australian state election: Morley
Party	Candidate	Votes	%	±%
Labor	Arthur Tonkin	9,866	64.7	+6.4
Liberal	Kevin Egan	5,374	35.3	−6.4
Total formal votes		15,240	95.7	−0.7
Informal votes		691	4.3	+0.7
Turnout		15,931	89.5	−1.5
Labor hold		Swing	+6.4	

=== Mount Hawthorn ===
1980 Western Australian state election: Mount Hawthorn
Party	Candidate	Votes	%	±%
Labor	Ron Bertram	8,343	59.7	+2.2
Liberal	Anne Klatt	5,632	40.3	−2.2
Total formal votes		13,975	96.1	+0.4
Informal votes		570	3.9	−0.4
Turnout		14,545	86.5	−3.2
Labor hold		Swing	+2.2	

=== Mount Lawley ===
1980 Western Australian state election: Mount Lawley
Party	Candidate	Votes	%	±%
Liberal	Ray O'Connor	7,401	54.3	−2.3
Labor	Leslie Whittle	4,885	35.8	−1.9
Democrats	Ronald Downie	1,348	9.9	+9.9
Total formal votes		13,634	95.6	−1.0
Informal votes		620	4.4	+1.0
Turnout		14,254	88.4	−1.7
Two-party-preferred result
Liberal	Ray O'Connor	8,075	59.2	−0.3
Labor	Leslie Whittle	5,559	40.8	+0.3
Liberal hold		Swing	−0.3	

=== Mount Marshall ===
1980 Western Australian state election: Mount Marshall
Party	Candidate	Votes	%	±%
National	Ray McPharlin	3,958	56.1	+56.1
Liberal	Bill McNee	1,769	25.1	−5.1
National Country	Joan Hardwick	1,323	18.8	−51.0
Total formal votes		7,050	97.7	+1.3
Informal votes		163	2.3	−1.3
Turnout		7,213	91.6	0.0
Two-candidate-preferred result
National	Walter McPharlin	4,289	60.8	+60.8
Liberal	Bill McNee	2,761	39.2	+9.0
National gain from National Country		Swing	N/A	

=== Mundaring ===
1980 Western Australian state election: Mundaring
Party	Candidate	Votes	%	±%
Liberal	Tom Herzfeld	3,588	46.5	−2.7
Labor	William Bartholomaeus	3,427	44.4	−2.5
National Country	Michael Johnson	697	9.0	+9.0
Total formal votes		7,712	97.1	+0.7
Informal votes		226	2.9	−0.7
Turnout		7,938	89.1	−0.6
Two-party-preferred result
Liberal	Tom Herzfeld	4,125	53.5	+1.3
Labor	William Batholomaeus	3,587	46.5	−1.3
Liberal hold		Swing	+1.3	

=== Murchison-Eyre ===
1980 Western Australian state election: Murchison-Eyre
Party	Candidate	Votes	%	±%
Liberal	Peter Coyne	746	48.4	−15.4
Labor	Mark Nevill	558	36.2	0.0
National	Kevin Seivwright	237	15.4	+15.4
Total formal votes		1,541	97.7	+0.2
Informal votes		37	2.3	−0.2
Turnout		1,578	78.9	−2.6
Two-party-preferred result
Liberal	Peter Coyne	909	59.0	−4.9
Labor	Mark Nevill	632	41.0	+4.9
Liberal hold		Swing	−4.9	

=== Murdoch ===
1980 Western Australian state election: Murdoch
Party	Candidate	Votes	%	±%
Liberal	Barry MacKinnon	10,006	48.8	−3.6
Labor	Garry Kelly	8,713	42.5	−5.1
Democrats	Richard Jeffreys	1,808	8.8	+8.8
Total formal votes		20,527	97.1	0.0
Informal votes		618	2.9	0.0
Turnout		21,145	90.9	−1.6
Two-party-preferred result
Liberal	Barry MacKinnon	11,040	53.8	+1.4
Labor	Garry Kelly	9,487	46.2	−1.4
Liberal hold		Swing	+1.4	

=== Murray ===
1980 Western Australian state election: Murray
Party	Candidate	Votes	%	±%
Liberal	Richard Shalders	5,640	59.2	−1.1
Labor	David King	3,893	40.8	+1.1
Total formal votes		9,533	97.8	+0.4
Informal votes		217	2.2	−0.4
Turnout		9,750	92.1	−1.6
Liberal hold		Swing	−1.1	

=== Narrogin ===
1980 Western Australian state election: Narrogin
Party	Candidate	Votes	%	±%
National Country	Peter Jones	5,397	77.0	−1.8
Labor	Malcolm Turner	1,614	23.0	+23.0
Total formal votes		7,011	98.1	+2.7
Informal votes		136	1.9	−2.7
Turnout		7,147	92.0	−1.6
National Country hold		Swing	N/A	

=== Nedlands ===
1980 Western Australian state election: Nedlands
Party	Candidate	Votes	%	±%
Liberal	Charles Court	8,448	67.8	−3.2
Labor	Peter O'Donoghue	3,320	26.6	+3.7
Independent	James Croasdale	694	5.6	+4.6
Total formal votes		12,462	97.5	−0.4
Informal votes		313	2.5	+0.4
Turnout		12,775	88.3	−1.7
Two-party-preferred result
Liberal	Charles Court	8,795	70.6	−3.4
Labor	Peter O'Donoghue	3,667	29.4	+3.4
Liberal hold		Swing	−3.4	

=== Perth ===
1980 Western Australian state election: Perth
Party	Candidate	Votes	%	±%
Labor	Terry Burke	6,638	61.8	+2.1
Liberal	Bernard Smith	3,515	32.7	−7.6
Independent	James Connolly	597	5.5	+5.5
Total formal votes		10,750	94.3	−1.9
Informal votes		650	5.7	+1.9
Turnout		11,400	80.2	−5.0
Two-party-preferred result
Labor	Terry Burke	7,116	66.2	+6.5
Liberal	Bernard Smith	3,634	33.8	−6.5
Labor hold		Swing	+6.5	

=== Pilbara ===
1980 Western Australian state election: Pilbara
Party	Candidate	Votes	%	±%
Liberal	Brian Sodeman	5,880	47.6	−5.2
Labor	Gilbert Barr	5,551	44.9	−2.3
Democrats	Blair Nancarrow	927	7.5	+7.5
Total formal votes		12,358	94.6	−1.7
Informal votes		705	5.4	+1.7
Turnout		13,063	78.2	−5.2
Two-party-preferred result
Liberal	Brian Sodeman	6,383	51.6	−1.2
Labor	Gilbert Barr	5,975	48.4	+1.2
Liberal hold		Swing	−1.2	

=== Rockingham ===
1980 Western Australian state election: Rockingham
Party	Candidate	Votes	%	±%
Labor	Mike Barnett	7,144	63.4	+9.4
Liberal	Edward Smeding	4,124	36.6	−9.4
Total formal votes		11,268	97.7	−0.6
Informal votes		262	2.3	+0.6
Turnout		11,530	90.5	−2.0
Labor hold		Swing	+9.4	

=== Roe ===
1980 Western Australian state election: Roe
Party	Candidate	Votes	%	±%
Liberal	Geoff Grewar	3,766	47.2	−3.2
National Country	John Paterson	2,255	28.2	−5.6
Labor	Kevin Moore	1,111	13.9	−1.9
National	Owen Kirwan	849	10.6	+10.6
Total formal votes		7,981	97.5	−0.7
Informal votes		201	2.5	+0.7
Turnout		8,182	90.8	−1.2
Two-candidate-preferred result
Liberal	Geoff Grewar	4,879	61.1	+2.8
National Country	John Paterson	3,102	38.9	−2.8
Liberal hold		Swing	+2.8	

=== Scarborough ===
1980 Western Australian state election: Scarborough
Party	Candidate	Votes	%	±%
Liberal	Ray Young	7,172	56.2	−0.4
Labor	Malcolm Hall	5,585	43.8	+0.4
Total formal votes		12,757	96.8	−0.4
Informal votes		426	3.2	+0.4
Turnout		13,183	87.8	−2.9
Liberal hold		Swing	−0.4	

=== South Perth ===
1980 Western Australian state election: South Perth
Party	Candidate	Votes	%	±%
Liberal	Bill Grayden	7,132	58.4	−4.4
Labor	Malcolm Trudgen	3,950	32.3	−4.9
Democrats	Kevin Trent	1,133	9.3	+9.3
Total formal votes		12,215	97.1	−0.3
Informal votes		364	2.9	+0.3
Turnout		12,579	84.7	−3.3
Two-party-preferred result
Liberal	Bill Grayden	7,698	63.0	+0.2
Labor	Malcolm Trudgen	4,517	37.0	−0.2
Liberal hold		Swing	+0.2	

=== Stirling ===
1980 Western Australian state election: Stirling
Party	Candidate	Votes	%	±%
National	Matt Stephens	4,698	57.7	+57.7
Liberal	Gary Pollett	2,224	27.3	−1.4
National Country	Peter Squire	1,224	15.0	−56.3
Total formal votes		8,146	96.9	+0.4
Informal votes		263	3.1	−0.4
Turnout		8,409	92.3	−1.0
Two-candidate-preferred result
National	Matt Stephens	5,004	61.4	+61.4
Liberal	Gary Pollett	3,142	38.6	+9.9
National gain from National Country		Swing	N/A	

=== Subiaco ===
1980 Western Australian state election: Subiaco
Party	Candidate	Votes	%	±%
Liberal	Tom Dadour	8,175	63.9	−0.2
Labor	Marcelle Anderson	4,613	36.1	+0.2
Total formal votes		12,788	97.4	−0.3
Informal votes		341	2.6	+0.3
Turnout		13,129	83.8	−3.9
Liberal hold		Swing	−0.2	

=== Swan ===
1980 Western Australian state election: Swan
Party	Candidate	Votes	%	±%
Labor	Jack Skidmore	8,737	58.0	+2.0
Liberal	John George	5,387	35.8	−8.2
National Country	Howard Wilcockson	737	4.9	+4.9
Independent	Howard Bowra	195	1.3	+1.3
Total formal votes		15,056	95.8	−0.1
Informal votes		663	4.2	+0.1
Turnout		15,719	89.0	−1.6
Two-party-preferred result
Labor	Jack Skidmore	8,967	59.6	+3.6
Liberal	John George	6,089	40.4	−3.6
Labor hold		Swing	+3.6	

=== Vasse ===
1980 Western Australian state election: Vasse
Party	Candidate	Votes	%	±%
Liberal	Barry Blaikie	6,147	68.2	+0.9
Labor	Barbara Taylor	2,236	24.8	+0.8
Independent	Alfred Bussell	623	6.9	+6.9
Total formal votes		9,006	97.8	−0.1
Informal votes		201	2.2	+0.1
Turnout		9,207	92.3	−2.7
Two-party-preferred result
Liberal	Barry Blaikie	6,454	71.7	+0.1
Labor	Barbara Taylor	2,552	28.3	−0.1
Liberal hold		Swing	+0.1	

=== Victoria Park ===
1980 Western Australian state election: Victoria Park
Party	Candidate	Votes	%	±%
Labor	Ron Davies	7,880	62.4	+2.8
Liberal	Michael Smith	4,430	35.1	−5.3
Socialist Workers	Peter Holloway	323	2.6	+2.6
Total formal votes		12,633	96.2	−0.1
Informal votes		501	3.8	+0.1
Turnout		13,134	86.7	−3.0
Two-party-preferred result
Labor	Ron Davies	8,171	64.7	+5.1
Liberal	Michael Smith	4,462	35.3	−5.1
Labor hold		Swing	+5.1	

=== Warren ===
1980 Western Australian state election: Warren
Party	Candidate	Votes	%	±%
Labor	David Evans	5,126	62.5	+8.6
Liberal	Graham Happ	3,080	37.5	−4.7
Total formal votes		8,206	97.2	−1.1
Informal votes		232	2.8	+1.1
Turnout		8,438	91.6	−1.3
Labor hold		Swing	+6.7	

=== Wellington ===
1980 Western Australian state election: Wellington
Party	Candidate	Votes	%	±%
Liberal	June Craig	4,780	59.2	−2.1
Labor	Patricia Rutherford	3,298	40.8	+2.1
Total formal votes		8,078	96.7	−0.4
Informal votes		274	3.3	+0.4
Turnout		8,352	91.4	−1.3
Liberal hold		Swing	−2.1	

=== Welshpool ===
1980 Western Australian state election: Welshpool
Party	Candidate	Votes	%	±%
Labor	Colin Jamieson	8,084	59.4	+3.2
Liberal	Francesco Piccolo	5,533	40.6	−3.2
Total formal votes		13,617	95.4	−0.3
Informal votes		659	4.6	+0.3
Turnout		14,276	87.5	−2.6
Labor hold		Swing	+3.2	

=== Whitford ===
1980 Western Australian state election: Whitford
Party	Candidate	Votes	%	±%
Liberal	Mick Nanovich	13,337	54.5	−7.9
Labor	Nick Griffiths	9,266	37.8	+0.2
Democrats	Harvard Barclay	1,882	7.7	+7.7
Total formal votes		24,485	96.9	−0.9
Informal votes		769	3.1	+0.9
Turnout		25,254	90.4	−2.4
Two-party-preferred result
Liberal	Mick Nanovich	14,278	58.3	−4.1
Labor	Nick Griffiths	10,207	41.7	+4.1
Liberal hold		Swing	−4.1	

=== Yilgarn-Dundas ===
1980 Western Australian state election: Yilgarn-Dundas
Party	Candidate	Votes	%	±%
Labor	Julian Grill	4,242	72.8	−11.0
Liberal	James Mazza	1,584	27.2	−7.3
Total formal votes		5,826	94.5	+0.4
Informal votes		339	5.5	−0.4
Turnout		6,165	82.9	−4.2
Labor hold		Swing	+10.1	

== See also ==
- 1980 Western Australian state election
- Members of the Western Australian Legislative Assembly, 1980–1983
