= Members of the Western Australian Legislative Assembly, 1983–1986 =

This is a list of members of the Western Australian Legislative Assembly from 1983 to 1986:

Name	Party	District	Years in office
Mike Barnett	Labor	Rockingham	1974–1996
Tom Bateman	Labor	Canning	1968–1989
Pam Beggs	Labor	Whitford	1983–1993
Ron Bertram	Labor	Balcatta	1968–1989
Barry Blaikie	Liberal	Vasse	1971–1996
John Bradshaw	Liberal	Murray-Wellington	1983–2005
Ernie Bridge	Labor	Kimberley	1980–2001
Mal Bryce	Labor	Ascot	1971–1988
Pam Buchanan	Labor	Pilbara	1983–1992
Brian Burke	Labor	Balga	1973–1988
Terry Burke	Labor	Perth	1968–1987
Graham Burkett	Labor	Scarborough	1983–1989
Jeff Carr	Labor	Geraldton	1974–1991
George Cash^{[3]}	Liberal	Mount Lawley	1984–1989
Jim Clarko	Liberal	Karrinyup	1974–1996
Richard Court	Liberal	Nedlands	1982–2001
Hendy Cowan	NP/National^{[5]}	Merredin	1974–2001
Peter Coyne	Liberal	Murchison-Eyre	1971–1986
Bert Crane	NCP/Liberal^{[5]}	Moore	1974–1989
Tom Dadour	Liberal/Independent^{[2]}	Subiaco	1971–1986
David Evans	Labor	Warren	1968–1989
Ron Davies	Labor	Victoria Park	1961–1986
Bill Grayden	Liberal	South Perth	1947–1949; 1956–1993
Julian Grill	Labor	Esperance-Dundas	1977–2001
John Harman	Labor	Maylands	1968–1986
Bill Hassell	Liberal	Cottesloe	1977–1990
Yvonne Henderson	Labor	Gosnells	1983–1996
Gordon Hill	Labor	Helena	1982–1994
Barry Hodge	Labor	Melville	1977–1989
Clive Hughes^{[4]}	Labor	Cockburn	1984–1986
Colin Jamieson	Labor	Welshpool	1953–1986
Peter Jones	NCP/Liberal^{[5]}	Narrogin	1974–1986
Tom Jones	Labor	Collie	1968–1989
Ian Laurance	Liberal	Gascoyne	1974–1987
Ken McIver	Labor	Avon	1968–1986
Barry MacKinnon	Liberal	Murdoch	1977–1993
Bill McNee	Liberal	Mount Marshall	1983–1986; 1989–2005
Andrew Mensaros	Liberal	Floreat	1968–1991
Ray O'Connor^{[3]}	Liberal	Mount Lawley	1959–1984
Dick Old	NCP/Liberal^{[5]}	Katanning-Roe	1974–1986
David Parker	Labor	Fremantle	1980–1990
Bob Pearce	Labor	Armadale	1977–1993
John Read	Labor	Mandurah	1983–1989
Cyril Rushton	Liberal	Dale	1965–1988
David Smith	Labor	Mitchell	1983–1996
Phil Smith	Labor	Bunbury	1983–1993
George Spriggs	Liberal	Darling Range	1977–1987
Matt Stephens	NP/National^{[5]}	Stirling	1971–1989
Don Taylor^{[4]}	Labor	Cockburn	1968–1984
Ian Taylor	Labor	Kalgoorlie	1981–1996
Ian Thompson	Liberal	Kalamunda	1971–1993
Arthur Tonkin	Labor	Morley-Swan	1971–1987
Anthony Trethowan	Liberal	East Melville	1980–1986
Gavan Troy^{[1]}	Labor	Mundaring	1983–1993
Reg Tubby	Liberal	Greenough	1975–1989
Jackie Watkins	Labor	Joondalup	1983–1993
Leo Watt	Liberal	Albany	1974–1993
Tony Williams	Liberal	Clontarf	1977–1989
Keith Wilson	Labor	Nollamara	1977–1993

== Notes ==
^{1} At the 1983 election, Labor candidate Gavan Troy won the seat of Mundaring by just 16 votes against the sitting member and Liberal candidate Tom Herzfeld. On 2 September 1983, the Court of Disputed Returns ordered a fresh election, which Troy won on 8 October.
^{2} In 1984, the Liberal member for Subiaco, Tom Dadour, left his party. He served out his term as an independent.
^{3} On 17 August 1984, the Liberal member for Mount Lawley, former Premier Ray O'Connor, resigned. Liberal candidate George Cash won the resulting by-election on 17 November 1984.
^{4} On 31 August 1984, the Labor member for Cockburn, Don Taylor, resigned. Labor candidate Clive Hughes won the resulting by-election on 17 November 1984.
^{5} In 1978, the National Party split from the National Country Party over the coalition question, with the NCP remaining in coalition with the Liberal Party, and the NP occupying the cross-benches. In 1985, the two parties reunited as the National Party of Western Australia, affiliated to the National Party of Australia. However the three former NCP members, unhappy with some of the terms of the reunification, quit the new party and joined the Liberal Party.

== Sources ==
- "Former Members" (PDF). Parliament of Western Australia. 2011. Archived from the original (PDF) on 7 August 2011.
