= Members of the Western Australian Legislative Assembly, 1971–1974 =

This is a list of members of the Western Australian Legislative Assembly from 1971 to 1974:

Name	Party	District	Years in office
Tom Bateman	Labor	Canning	1968–1986
Ron Bertram	Labor	Mount Hawthorn	1968–1989
Arthur Bickerton	Labor	Pilbara	1958–1974
Barry Blaikie	Liberal	Vasse	1971–1996
John Brady	Labor	Swan	1948–1974
Sir David Brand	Liberal	Greenough	1945–1975
James Brown	Labor	Merredin-Yilgarn	1971–1974
Mal Bryce^{[1]}	Labor	Ascot	1971–1988
Brian Burke^{[4]}	Labor	Balcatta	1973–1988
Terry Burke	Labor	Perth	1968–1987
Wyndham Cook	Labor	Albany	1970–1974
Sir Charles Court	Liberal	Nedlands	1953–1982
Peter Coyne	Liberal	Murchison-Eyre	1971–1986
Tom Dadour	Liberal	Subiaco	1971–1986
Ron Davies	Labor	Victoria Park	1961–1986
David Evans	Labor	Warren	1968–1989
Tom Evans	Labor	Kalgoorlie	1956–1980
Harry Fletcher	Labor	Fremantle	1959–1977
Harry Gayfer	Country	Avon	1962–1974
Herb Graham^{[4]}	Labor	Balcatta	1943–1973
Bill Grayden	Liberal	South Perth	1947–1949; 1956–1993
John Harman	Labor	Maylands	1968–1986
Tom Hartrey	Labor	Boulder-Dundas	1971–1977
Ross Hutchinson	Liberal	Cottesloe	1950–1977
Colin Jamieson	Labor	Belmont	1953–1986
Tom Jones	Labor	Collie	1968–1989
Stan Lapham	Labor	Karrinyup	1953–1959; 1968–1974
Sandy Lewis^{[2]}	Liberal	Blackwood	1972–1974
Edgar Lewis	Country	Moore	1958–1974
Iven Manning	Liberal	Wellington	1950–1974
William Manning	Country	Narrogin	1956–1974
Donald May	Labor	Clontarf	1962–1965; 1968–1977
Ken McIver	Labor	Northam	1968–1986
Ray McPharlin	Country	Mount Marshall	1967–1983
Andrew Mensaros	Liberal	Floreat	1968–1991
James Moiler	Labor	Toodyay	1971–1977
Crawford Nalder	Country	Katanning	1947–1974
Daniel Norton	Labor	Gascoyne	1953–1974
Ray O'Connor	Liberal	Mount Lawley	1959–1984
Des O'Neil	Liberal	East Melville	1959–1980
David Reid^{[2]}	Country	Blackwood	1971–1972
Alan Ridge	Liberal	Kimberley	1968–1980
Ewart Runciman	Liberal	Murray	1962–1974
Cyril Rushton	Liberal	Dale	1965–1988
Bill Sewell	Labor	Geraldton	1950–1974
John Sibson^{[3]}	Liberal	Bunbury	1973–1983
Matt Stephens	Country	Stirling	1971–1989
Don Taylor	Labor	Cockburn	1968–1984
Ian Thompson	Liberal	Darling Range	1971–1993
Merv Toms^{[1]}	Labor	Ascot	1956–1971
Arthur Tonkin	Labor	Mirrabooka	1971–1987
John Tonkin	Labor	Melville	1933–1977
Maurice Williams^{[3]}	Liberal	Bunbury	1962–1973
Bill Young	Country	Roe	1967–1974
Ray Young	Liberal	Wembley	1971–1983

== Notes ==
^{1} On 8 October 1971, the Labor member for Ascot and Speaker of the Assembly, Merv Toms, died. The Labor candidate, Mal Bryce, won the resulting by-election on 13 November 1971.
^{2} On 26 October 1972, the Country member for Blackwood, David Reid, resigned to contest the seat of Forrest in the House of Representatives. Liberal candidate Sandy Lewis won the resulting by-election on 16 December 1972.
^{3} On 28 February 1973, the Liberal member for Bunbury, Maurice Williams, resigned. Liberal candidate John Sibson won the resulting by-election on 7 April 1973.
^{4} On 30 May 1973, the Labor member for Balcatta, Herb Graham, resigned following his appointment to the Licensing Court. Labor candidate Brian Burke won the resulting by-election on 28 July 1973.

== Sources ==
- "Former Members" (PDF). Parliament of Western Australia. 2011. Archived from the original (PDF) on 7 August 2011.
