= Members of the Western Australian Legislative Assembly, 1986–1989 =

This is a list of members of the Western Australian Legislative Assembly from 1986 to 1989:

Name	Party	District	Years in office
Ian Alexander^{[5]}	Labor	Perth	1987–1993
Mike Barnett	Labor	Rockingham	1974–1996
Tom Bateman	Labor	Canning	1968–1989
Pam Beggs	Labor	Whitford	1983–1993
Ron Bertram	Labor	Balcatta	1968–1989
Barry Blaikie	Liberal	Vasse	1971–1996
John Bradshaw	Liberal	Murray-Wellington	1983–2005
Ernie Bridge	Labor	Kimberley	1980–2001
Mal Bryce^{[9]}	Labor	Ascot	1971–1988
Pam Buchanan	Labor	Pilbara	1983–1992
Brian Burke^{[8]}	Labor	Balga	1973–1988
Terry Burke^{[5]}	Labor	Perth	1968–1987
Graham Burkett	Labor	Scarborough	1983–1989
Jeff Carr	Labor	Geraldton	1974–1991
George Cash	Liberal	Mount Lawley	1984–1989
Jim Clarko	Liberal	Karrinyup	1974–1996
Richard Court	Liberal	Nedlands	1982–2001
Hendy Cowan	National	Merredin	1974–2001
Bert Crane	Liberal	Moore	1974–1989
Ted Cunningham^{[8]}	Labor	Balga	1988–2001
Ron Davies^{[2]}	Labor	Victoria Park	1961–1986
Frank Donovan^{[4]}	Labor	Morley-Swan	1987–1993
Peter Dowding	Labor	Maylands	1986–1990
David Evans	Labor	Warren	1968–1989
Geoff Gallop^{[2]}	Labor	Victoria Park	1986–2006
Bill Grayden	Liberal	South Perth	1947–1949; 1956–1993
Bob Greig^{[7]}	Liberal	Darling Range	1987–1989
Julian Grill	Labor	Esperance-Dundas	1977–2001
Bill Hassell	Liberal	Cottesloe	1977–1990
Yvonne Henderson	Labor	Gosnells	1983–1996
Gordon Hill	Labor	Helena	1982–1994
Barry Hodge	Labor	Melville	1977–1989
Monty House	National	Katanning-Roe	1986–2005
Clive Hughes^{[1]}	Labor	Cockburn	1984–1986
Tom Jones	Labor	Collie	1968–1989
Ian Laurance^{[6]}	Liberal	Gascoyne	1974–1987
Carmen Lawrence	Labor	Subiaco	1986–1994
Dudley Maslen^{[6]}	Liberal	Gascoyne	1987–1989
Richard Lewis	Liberal	East Melville	1986–1996
Ross Lightfoot	Liberal	Murchison-Eyre	1986–1989
Barry MacKinnon	Liberal	Murdoch	1977–1993
Norm Marlborough^{[1]}	Labor	Cockburn	1986–2006
Andrew Mensaros	Liberal	Floreat	1968–1991
Cambell Nalder^{[3]}	National	Narrogin	1986–1987
David Parker	Labor	Fremantle	1980–1990
Bob Pearce	Labor	Armadale	1977–1993
John Read	Labor	Mandurah	1983–1989
Eric Ripper^{[9]}	Labor	Ascot	1988–2013
Cyril Rushton^{[10]}	Liberal	Dale	1965–1988
Mort Schell	National	Mount Marshall	1986–1989
David Smith	Labor	Mitchell	1983–1996
Phil Smith	Labor	Bunbury	1983–1993
George Spriggs^{[7]}	Liberal	Darling Range	1977–1987
Matt Stephens	National	Stirling	1971–1989
Ian Taylor	Labor	Kalgoorlie	1981–1996
Bill Thomas	Labor	Welshpool	1986–2001
Ian Thompson	Liberal	Kalamunda	1971–1993
Arthur Tonkin^{[4]}	Labor	Morley-Swan	1971–1987
Max Trenorden	National	Avon	1986–2008
Gavan Troy	Labor	Mundaring	1983–1993
Fred Tubby^{[10]}	Liberal	Dale	1988–2001
Reg Tubby	Liberal	Greenough	1975–1989
Jackie Watkins	Labor	Joondalup	1983–1993
Judyth Watson	Labor	Canning	1986–1996
Leo Watt	Liberal	Albany	1974–1993
Bob Wiese^{[3]}	National	Narrogin	1987–2001
Tony Williams	Liberal	Clontarf	1977–1989
Keith Wilson	Labor	Nollamara	1977–1993

== Notes ==
^{1} On 4 April 1986, the Labor member for Cockburn, Clive Hughes, died. Labor candidate Norm Marlborough won the resulting by-election on 7 June 1986.
^{2} On 16 April 1986, the Labor member for Victoria Park, Ron Davies, resigned to take up the role of Agent-General for Western Australia in London. Labor candidate Geoff Gallop won the resulting by-election on 7 June 1986.
^{3} On 14 March 1987, the National member for Narrogin, Cambell Nalder, died. National candidate Bob Wiese won the resulting by-election on 9 May 1987.
^{4} On 18 March 1987, the Labor member for Morley-Swan, Arthur Tonkin, resigned. Labor candidate Frank Donovan won the resulting by-election on 9 May 1987.
^{5} On 18 March 1987, the Labor member for Perth, Terry Burke, resigned. Labor candidate Ian Alexander won the resulting by-election on 9 May 1987.
^{6} On 3 September 1987, the Liberal member for Gascoyne, Ian Laurance, resigned. Liberal candidate Dudley Maslen won the resulting by-election on 24 October 1987.
^{7} On 3 September 1987, the Liberal member for Darling Range, George Spriggs, resigned. Liberal candidate Bob Greig won the resulting by-election on 24 October 1987.
^{8} On 17 February 1988, the Labor member for Balga and Premier, Brian Burke, resigned. Labor candidate Ted Cunningham won the resulting by-election on 19 March 1988.
^{9} On 17 February 1988, the Labor member for Ascot and Deputy Premier, Mal Bryce, resigned. Labor candidate Eric Ripper won the resulting by-election on 19 March 1988.
^{10} On 25 February 1988, the Liberal member for Dale, former Court government minister Cyril Rushton, resigned. Liberal candidate Fred Tubby won the resulting by-election on 7 May 1988.

== Sources ==
- "Former Members" (PDF). Parliament of Western Australia. 2011. Archived from the original (PDF) on 7 August 2011.
