= Members of the Western Australian Legislative Assembly, 1980–1983 =

This is a list of members of the Western Australian Legislative Assembly from 1980 to 1983:

Name	Party	District	Years in office
Mike Barnett	Labor	Rockingham	1974–1996
Tom Bateman	Labor	Canning	1968–1989
Ron Bertram	Labor	Mount Hawthorn	1968–1989
Barry Blaikie	Liberal	Vasse	1971–1996
Ernie Bridge	Labor	Kimberley	1980–2001
Mal Bryce	Labor	Ascot	1971–1988
Brian Burke	Labor	Balcatta	1973–1988
Terry Burke	Labor	Perth	1968–1987
Jeff Carr	Labor	Geraldton	1974–1991
Jim Clarko	Liberal	Karrinyup	1974–1996
Sir Charles Court^{[2]}	Liberal	Nedlands	1953–1982
Richard Court^{[2]}	Liberal	Nedlands	1982–2001
Hendy Cowan	National	Merredin	1974–2001
Peter Coyne	Liberal	Murchison-Eyre	1971–1986
June Craig	Liberal	Wellington	1974–1983
Bert Crane	National Country	Moore	1974–1989
Tom Dadour	Liberal	Subiaco	1971–1986
David Evans	Labor	Warren	1968–1989
Ron Davies	Labor	Victoria Park	1961–1986
Ted Evans^{[1]}	Labor	Kalgoorlie	1980–1981
Bill Grayden	Liberal	South Perth	1947–1949; 1956–1993
Geoff Grewar	Liberal	Roe	1974–1983
Julian Grill	Labor	Yilgarn-Dundas	1977–2001
John Harman	Labor	Maylands	1968–1986
Bill Hassell	Liberal	Cottesloe	1977–1990
Tom Herzfeld	Liberal	Mundaring	1977–1983
Gordon Hill^{[3]}	Labor	Swan	1982–1994
Barry Hodge	Labor	Melville	1977–1989
Colin Jamieson	Labor	Welshpool	1953–1986
Peter Jones	National Country	Narrogin	1974–1986
Tom Jones	Labor	Collie	1968–1989
Ian Laurance	Liberal	Gascoyne	1974–1987
Ken McIver	Labor	Avon	1968–1986
Barry MacKinnon	Liberal	Murdoch	1977–1993
Ray McPharlin	National/NCP^{[4]}	Mount Marshall	1967–1983
Andrew Mensaros	Liberal	Floreat	1968–1991
Mick Nanovich	Liberal	Whitford	1974–1983
Ray O'Connor	Liberal	Mount Lawley	1959–1984
Dick Old	National Country	Katanning	1974–1986
David Parker	Labor	Fremantle	1980–1990
Bob Pearce	Labor	Gosnells	1977–1993
Cyril Rushton	Liberal	Dale	1965–1988
Richard Shalders	Liberal	Murray	1974–1983
John Sibson	Liberal	Bunbury	1973–1983
Jack Skidmore^{[3]}	Labor/Independent	Swan	1974–1982
Brian Sodeman	Liberal	Pilbara	1974–1983
George Spriggs	Liberal	Darling Range	1977–1987
Matt Stephens	National	Stirling	1971–1989
Don Taylor	Labor	Cockburn	1968–1984
Ian Taylor^{[1]}	Labor	Kalgoorlie	1981–1996
Ian Thompson	Liberal	Kalamunda	1971–1993
Arthur Tonkin	Labor	Morley	1971–1987
Anthony Trethowan	Liberal	East Melville	1980–1986
Reg Tubby	Liberal	Greenough	1975–1989
Leo Watt	Liberal	Albany	1974–1993
Tony Williams	Liberal	Clontarf	1977–1989
Keith Wilson	Labor	Dianella	1977–1993
Ray Young	Liberal	Scarborough	1971–1983

== Notes ==
^{1} On 30 April 1981, the Labor member for Kalgoorlie, Ted Evans, died, just one year into his first term. Labor candidate Ian Taylor won the resulting by-election on 20 June 1981.
^{2} On 31 January 1982, the Premier and Liberal member for Nedlands, Sir Charles Court, resigned. His son, Richard Court, won the resulting by-election on 13 March 1982.
^{3} In October 1981, the Labor member for Swan, Jack Skidmore, resigned from the party to sit as an independent. He subsequently resigned from parliament on 31 January 1982. Labor candidate Gordon Hill won the resulting by-election on 13 March 1982.
^{4} On 12 May 1982, Ray McPharlin, the member for Mount Marshall, resigned from the National Party and joined the National Country Party.

== Sources ==
- "Former Members" (PDF). Parliament of Western Australia. 2011. Archived from the original (PDF) on 7 August 2011.
