= Members of the Western Australian Legislative Assembly =

Following are lists of members of the Western Australian Legislative Assembly:

- 1890–1894
- 1894–1897
- 1897–1901
- 1901–1904
- 1904–1905
- 1905–1908
- 1908–1911
- 1911–1914
- 1914–1917
- 1917–1921
- 1921–1924
- 1924–1927
- 1927–1930
- 1930–1933
- 1933–1936
- 1936–1939
- 1939–1943
- 1943–1947
- 1947–1950
- 1950–1953
- 1953–1956
- 1956–1959
- 1959–1962
- 1962–1965
- 1965–1968
- 1968–1971
- 1971–1974
- 1974–1977
- 1977–1980
- 1980–1983
- 1983–1986
- 1986–1989
- 1989–1993
- 1993–1996
- 1996–2001
- 2001–2005
- 2005–2008
- 2008–2013
- 2013–2017
- 2017–2021
- 2021-2025
- 2025-2029
