= Electoral results for the district of Balcatta =

Western Australian district election results

This is a list of electoral results for the electoral district of Balcatta in Western Australian state elections.

== Members for Balcatta ==
Balcatta (1904–1911)
Member	Party	Term
Frederick Gill	Labor	1904–1905
John Veryard	Ministerial	1905–1908
Frederick Gill	Labor	1908–1911
Balcatta (1962–1974)
Member	Party	Term
Herb Graham	Labor	1962–1973
Brian Burke	Labor	1973–1974
Balcatta (1977–1996)
Member	Party	Term
Brian Burke	Labor	1977–1983
Ron Bertram	Labor	1983–1989
Nick Catania	Labor	1989–1996
Balcatta (2005–present)
Member	Party	Term
John Kobelke	Labor	2005–2013
Chris Hatton	Liberal	2013–2017
David Michael	Labor	2017–present

== Election results ==
=== Elections in the 2020s ===
2025 Western Australian state election: Balcatta
Party	Candidate	Votes	%	±%
Labor	David Michael	12,404	49.4	−17.1
Liberal	James Helliwell	6,500	25.9	+7.1
Greens	Trevor Don	3,120	12.4	+4.8
One Nation	David Potter	1,055	4.2	+4.2
Legalise Cannabis	Chris Cole	896	3.6	+3.6
Christians	Wesley D'Costa	632	2.5	+0.4
Shooters, Fishers, Farmers	Robert Hollier	514	2.0	+2.0
Total formal votes		25,121	95.0	−0.1
Informal votes		1,318	5.0	+0.1
Turnout		26,439	86.6	+3.2
Two-party-preferred result
Labor	David Michael	16,192	64.5	−11.2
Liberal	James Helliwell	8,908	35.5	+11.2
Labor hold		Swing	−11.2	

Results are not final. Last updated on 27 March 2025 at 7:00 PM AWST

2021 Western Australian state election: Balcatta
Party	Candidate	Votes	%	±%
Labor	David Michael	15,894	66.5	+19.9
Liberal	Wayne Evans	4,497	18.8	−17.3
Greens	Benedict Guinery	1,818	7.6	−2.7
Christians	Rose Anderson	504	2.1	−1.1
Liberal Democrats	Damian Coletta	489	2.0	+1.2
No Mandatory Vaccination	Daniel Thornton	453	1.9	+1.9
WAxit	Domenic Staltari	238	1.0	+1.0
Total formal votes		23,893	95.1	+1.6
Informal votes		1,222	4.9	−1.6
Turnout		25,115	85.0	−1.6
Two-party-preferred result
Labor	David Michael	18,087	75.8	+17.7
Liberal	Wayne Evans	5,790	24.2	−17.7
Labor hold		Swing	+17.7	

=== Elections in the 2010s ===
2017 Western Australian state election: Balcatta
Party	Candidate	Votes	%	±%
Labor	David Michael	10,265	44.2	+8.6
Liberal	Chris Hatton	8,885	38.3	−13.3
Greens	Nicole Harvey	2,508	10.8	+2.6
Christians	Keith McEncroe	749	3.2	+1.6
Micro Business	Mile Nasteski	544	2.3	+2.3
Liberal Democrats	Richard Tait	252	1.1	+1.1
Total formal votes		23,203	94.2	+1.7
Informal votes		1,426	5.8	−1.7
Turnout		24,629	88.1	+0.3
Two-party-preferred result
Labor	David Michael	12,950	55.8	+12.9
Liberal	Chris Hatton	10,247	44.2	−12.9
Labor gain from Liberal		Swing	+12.9	

2013 Western Australian state election: Balcatta
Party	Candidate	Votes	%	±%
Liberal	Chris Hatton	10,756	51.9	+10.7
Labor	Janet Pettigrew	7,341	35.4	–6.5
Greens	Sheridan Young	1,705	8.2	–3.3
Christians	Peter Dodd	322	1.6	–2.0
Family First	Lesley Croll	264	1.3	–0.6
Independent	Joe Ruzzi	234	1.1	+1.1
Independent	Mubarak Kim Kidima	122	0.6	+0.6
Total formal votes		20,744	92.3	−0.7
Informal votes		1,727	7.7	+0.7
Turnout		22,471	89.6	
Two-party-preferred result
Liberal	Chris Hatton	11,886	57.3	+9.5
Labor	Janet Pettigrew	8,841	42.7	–9.5
Liberal gain from Labor		Swing	+9.5	

=== Elections in the 2000s ===
2008 Western Australian state election: Balcatta
Party	Candidate	Votes	%	±%
Labor	John Kobelke	7,897	42.10	−9.7
Liberal	Chris Hatton	7,682	40.95	+6.6
Greens	Irma Lachmund	2,110	11.25	+2.6
Christian Democrats	Peter Schofield	692	3.69	−1.4
Family First	Inge George	377	2.01	+2.01
Total formal votes		18,758	93.05	
Informal votes		1,402	6.95	
Turnout		20,160	86.28	
Two-party-preferred result
Labor	John Kobelke	9,804	52.30	−6.9
Liberal	Chris Hatton	8,941	47.70	+6.9
Labor hold		Swing	−6.9	

2005 Western Australian state election: Balcatta
Party	Candidate	Votes	%	±%
Labor	John Kobelke	12,489	52.2	+3.4
Liberal	Melinda Poor	8,028	33.6	+2.5
Greens	Kayt Davies	2,122	8.9	+2.0
Christian Democrats	Michael Ewers	1,278	5.3	+5.3
Total formal votes		23,917	93.6	+0.4
Informal votes		1,639	6.4	−0.4
Turnout		25,556	89.9	
Two-party-preferred result
Labor	John Kobelke	14,306	59.9	−1.0
Liberal	Melinda Poor	9,575	40.1	+1.0
Labor hold		Swing	−1.0	

=== Elections in the 1990s ===
1993 Western Australian state election: Balcatta
Party	Candidate	Votes	%	±%
Labor	Nick Catania	9,157	48.9	−2.5
Liberal	Katie Hodson-Thomas	7,892	42.1	+0.9
Greens	Jack Geneff	1,009	5.4	+5.4
Democrats	Yvette Heath	670	3.6	+3.6
Total formal votes		18,728	95.0	+5.9
Informal votes		988	5.0	−5.9
Turnout		19,716	93.8	+2.1
Two-party-preferred result
Labor	Nick Catania	10,195	54.4	+0.4
Liberal	Katie Hodson-Thomas	8,533	45.6	−0.4
Labor hold		Swing	+0.4	

=== Elections in the 1980s ===
1989 Western Australian state election: Balcatta
Party	Candidate	Votes	%	±%
Labor	Nick Catania	8,806	51.4	−12.4
Liberal	Marie Wordsworth	7,065	41.2	+5.0
Grey Power	Brendan O'Dwyer	1,267	7.4	+7.4
Total formal votes		17,138	89.1	
Informal votes		2,088	10.9	
Turnout		19,226	91.7	
Two-party-preferred result
Labor	Nick Catania	9,248	54.0	−9.8
Liberal	Marie Wordsworth	7,890	46.0	+9.8
Labor hold		Swing	−9.8	

1986 Western Australian state election: Balcatta
Party	Candidate	Votes	%	±%
Labor	Ron Bertram	11,543	63.4	+0.4
Liberal	Vincenzo Alessandrino	6,654	36.6	−0.4
Total formal votes		18,197	96.6	+0.3
Informal votes		633	3.4	−0.3
Turnout		18,830	91.8	+3.8
Labor hold		Swing	+0.4	

1983 Western Australian state election: Balcatta
Party	Candidate	Votes	%	±%
Labor	Ron Bertram	9,562	63.0	
Liberal	Vincenzo Allessandrino	5,627	37.0	
Total formal votes		15,189	96.3	
Informal votes		579	3.7	
Turnout		15,768	88.0	
Labor hold		Swing		

1980 Western Australian state election: Balcatta
Party	Candidate	Votes	%	±%
Labor	Brian Burke	10,709	68.7	+7.4
Liberal	John Bamford	4,869	31.3	−7.4
Total formal votes		15,578	96.0	−0.4
Informal votes		650	4.0	+0.4
Turnout		16,228	86.9	−3.1
Labor hold		Swing	+7.4	

=== Elections in the 1970s ===
1977 Western Australian state election: Balcatta
Party	Candidate	Votes	%	±%
Labor	Brian Burke	9,182	61.3	
Liberal	Geoffrey Hasler	5,799	38.7	
Total formal votes		14,981	96.4	
Informal votes		555	3.6	
Turnout		15,536	90.0	
Labor hold		Swing		

1973 Balcatta state by-election
Party	Candidate	Votes	%	±%
Liberal	Neil Beck	9,178	49.0	+49.0
Labor	Brian Burke	9,075	48.5	–18.0
Australia	Wilfrid Campin	469	2.5	+2.5
Total formal votes		18,722	97.5	+2.9
Informal votes		478	2.5	–2.9
Turnout		19,200	80.7	–19.3
Two-party-preferred result
Labor	Brian Burke	9,376	50.1	–16.5
Liberal	Neil Beck	9,346	49.9	+49.9
Labor hold		Swing	N/A	

1971 Western Australian state election: Balcatta
Party	Candidate	Votes	%	±%
Labor	Herb Graham	11,734	66.6	+3.2
Democratic Labor	Elmo Gugiatti	5,891	33.4	+33.4
Total formal votes		17,625	94.6	−1.5
Informal votes		1,013	5.4	+1.5
Turnout		18,638	92.0	−1.1
Labor hold		Swing	N/A	

=== Elections in the 1960s ===
1968 Western Australian state election: Balcatta
Party	Candidate	Votes	%	±%
Labor	Herb Graham	8,014	63.4	
Liberal and Country	Anthony Scolaro	4,626	36.6	
Total formal votes		12,640	96.1	
Informal votes		519	3.9	
Turnout		13,159	93.1	
Labor hold		Swing		

1965 Western Australian state election: Balcatta
Party	Candidate	Votes	%	±%
Labor	Herb Graham	6,787	53.7	−1.2
Liberal and Country	Terrence Browne	5,844	46.3	+8.7
Total formal votes		12,631	97.0	−1.2
Informal votes		389	3.0	+1.2
Turnout		13,020	94.4	−1.5
Labor hold		Swing	−2.3	

1962 Western Australian state election: Balcatta
Party	Candidate	Votes	%	±%
Labor	Herb Graham	5,371	54.9	
Liberal and Country	Rodney Treadgold	3,683	37.6	
Democratic Labor	Adrian Briffa	7,38	7.5	
Total formal votes		9,792	98.3	
Informal votes		167	1.7	
Turnout		9,959	95.9	
Two-party-preferred result
Labor	Herb Graham		56.0	
Liberal and Country	Rodney Treadgold		44.0	
Labor hold		Swing		

- Two party preferred vote was estimated.

=== Elections in the 1900s ===
1908 Western Australian state election: Balkatta
Party	Candidate	Votes	%	±%
Labour	Frederick Gill	1,299	52.0	+7.4
Ministerialist	John Veryard	1,197	48.0	−7.4
Total formal votes		2,496	98.8	−0.6
Informal votes		31	1.2	+0.6
Turnout		2,527	72.7	+15.0
Labour gain from Ministerialist		Swing	+7.4	

1905 Western Australian state election: Balcatta
Party	Candidate	Votes	%	±%
Ministerialist	John Veryard	768	55.4	+38.9
Labour	Frederick Gill	619	44.6	–11.9
Total formal votes		1,387	99.4	+0.9
Informal votes		8	0.6	–0.9
Turnout		1,395	57.7	+7.5
Ministerialist gain from Labour		Swing	+38.9	

1904 Western Australian state election: Balcatta
Party	Candidate	Votes	%	±%
Labour	Frederick Gill	938	56.5	+56.5
Independent	Thomas Molloy	448	27.0	+27.0
Ministerialist	Richard Taylor	273	16.5	+16.5
Total formal votes		1,659	98.5	n/a
Informal votes		25	1.5	n/a
Turnout		1,684	50.2	n/a
Labour win		(new seat)		
