= Electoral results for the district of Marangaroo =

This is a list of electoral results for the Electoral district of Marangaroo in Western Australian state elections from 1989 to 1996. The district was based in Perth's northern suburbs. It was a safe Labor seat.

== History ==
Marangaroo was first created for the 1989 state election and abolished ahead of the 1996 state election. The seat's member during its two terms was Labor MP Ted Cunningham. Cunningham was previously the member for Balga, which was abolished when Marangaroo was created. He went on to represent the new district of Girrawheen, which largely replaced Marangaroo.

== Members for Marangaroo ==
Member	Party	Term
Ted Cunningham	Labor	1989–1996

== Election results ==
=== Elections in the 1990s ===
1993 Western Australian state election: Marangaroo
Party	Candidate	Votes	%	±%
Labor	Ted Cunningham	12,966	56.1	−3.2
Liberal	Avis Gobby	7,486	32.4	−0.2
Independent	Ronald Bowman	1,276	5.5	+5.5
Greens	Otto Dik	772	3.3	+3.3
Independent	William Francis	599	2.6	+2.6
Total formal votes		23,099	95.1	+6.2
Informal votes		1,179	4.9	−6.2
Turnout		24,278	94.0	−2.2
Two-party-preferred result
Labor	Ted Cunningham	14,396	62.3	−0.1
Liberal	Avis Gobby	8,703	37.7	+0.1
Labor hold		Swing	−0.1	

=== Elections in the 1980s ===
1989 Western Australian state election: Marangaroo
Party	Candidate	Votes	%	±%
Labor	Ted Cunningham	9,418	59.2	−16.3
Liberal	William Lewis	5,188	32.6	+12.2
Grey Power	James Wilson	1,313	8.2	+8.2
Total formal votes		15,919	88.9	
Informal votes		1,992	11.1	
Turnout		17,911	91.8	
Two-party-preferred result
Labor	Ted Cunningham	9,937	62.4	−15.2
Liberal	William Lewis	5,982	37.6	+15.2
Labor hold		Swing	−15.2	
