= Electoral results for the district of Welshpool =

Western Australian district election results

This is a list of electoral results for the Electoral district of Welshpool in Western Australian state elections.

== Members for Welshpool ==
Member	Party	Term
Colin Jamieson	Labor	1974–1986
Bill Thomas	Labor	1986–1989

== Election results ==
=== Elections in the 1980s ===
1986 Western Australian state election: Welshpool
Party	Candidate	Votes	%	±%
Labor	Bill Thomas	10,073	63.2	−1.6
Liberal	Stephen Gardiner	5,872	36.8	+1.6
Total formal votes		15,945	95.9	−0.6
Informal votes		683	4.1	+0.6
Turnout		16,628	91.8	+4.0
Labor hold		Swing	−1.6	

1983 Western Australian state election: Welshpool
Party	Candidate	Votes	%	±%
Labor	Colin Jamieson	9,482	64.8	
Liberal	Robert Gray	5,159	35.2	
Total formal votes		14,641	96.5	
Informal votes		525	3.5	
Turnout		15,166	87.8	
Labor hold		Swing		

1980 Western Australian state election: Welshpool
Party	Candidate	Votes	%	±%
Labor	Colin Jamieson	8,084	59.4	+3.2
Liberal	Francesco Piccolo	5,533	40.6	−3.2
Total formal votes		13,617	95.4	−0.3
Informal votes		659	4.6	+0.3
Turnout		14,276	87.5	−2.6
Labor hold		Swing	+3.2	

=== Elections in the 1970s ===
1977 Western Australian state election: Welshpool
Party	Candidate	Votes	%	±%
Labor	Colin Jamieson	7,772	56.2	
Liberal	Brian Rose	6,065	43.8	
Total formal votes		13,837	95.7	
Informal votes		621	4.3	
Turnout		14,458	90.1	
Labor hold		Swing	−7.9	

1974 Western Australian state election: Welshpool
Party	Candidate	Votes	%	±%
Labor	Colin Jamieson	8,807	61.5	
Liberal	George Fisher	4,492	31.4	
National Alliance	Laurence Eaton	1,026	7.2	
Total formal votes		14,325	94.9	
Informal votes		763	5.1	
Turnout		15,088	88.6	
Two-party-preferred result
Labor	Colin Jamieson	8,961	62.6	
Liberal	George Fisher	5,364	37.4	
Labor hold		Swing		
