= Electoral results for the district of Balga =

Western Australian district election results

This is a list of electoral results for the Electoral district of Balga in Western Australian state elections.

== Members for Balga ==
Balga (1974–1977)
Member	Party	Term
Brian Burke	Labor	1974–1977
Balga (1983–1989)
Member	Party	Term
Brian Burke	Labor	1983–1988
Ted Cunningham	Labor	1988–1989

== Election results ==
=== Elections in the 1980s ===
1988 Balga state by-election
Party	Candidate	Votes	%	±%
Labor	Ted Cunningham	10,632	55.3	−22.5
Liberal	Reg Davies	6,908	35.9	+17.2
Independent	Edward Ayre	1,702	8.8	+8.8
Total formal votes		19,242	95.6	−1.7
Informal votes		888	4.4	+1.7
Turnout		20,130	79.8	−12.1
Two-party-preferred result
Labor	Ted Cunningham	10,872	56.5	−23.1
Liberal	Reg Davies	8,370	43.5	+23.1
Labor hold		Swing	−23.1	

1986 Western Australian state election: Balga
Party	Candidate	Votes	%	±%
Labor	Brian Burke	15,719	77.8	−1.2
Liberal	John Gordon	3,774	18.7	−2.3
Independent	William Nind	721	3.6	+3.6
Total formal votes		20,214	97.3	0.0
Informal votes		558	2.7	0.0
Turnout		20,772	91.9	+4.9
Two-party-preferred result
Labor	Brian Burke	16,090	79.6	+0.6
Liberal	John Gordon	4,124	20.4	−0.6
Labor hold		Swing	+0.6	

1983 Western Australian state election: Balga
Party	Candidate	Votes	%	±%
Labor	Brian Burke	11,654	79.0	
Liberal	Peter Nolan	3,101	21.0	
Total formal votes		14,755	97.3	
Informal votes		404	2.7	
Turnout		15,159	87.0	
Labor hold		Swing		

=== Elections in the 1970s ===
1974 Western Australian state election: Balga
Party	Candidate	Votes	%	±%
Labor	Brian Burke	8,761	62.0	
Liberal	Neil Beck	4,499	31.8	
National Alliance	Kenneth Austin	506	3.6	
Independent	Ralph Brockman	368	2.6	
Total formal votes		14,134	95.9	
Informal votes		601	4.1	
Turnout		14,735	93.7	
Two-party-preferred result
Labor	Brian Burke	9,021	63.8	
Liberal	Neil Beck	5,113	36.2	
Labor hold		Swing		
