= 1981 Western Australian Labor Party leadership spill =

- 18 September 1981
- Leadership election
Candidate	Brian Burke	Ron Davies
Caucus vote	20	11
Percentage	64.52%	35.48%
Seat	Balcatta	Victoria Park
Leader before election
Ron Davies
Elected Leader
Brian Burke
- Deputy leadership election
Candidate	Mal Bryce	David Evans
Caucus vote	19	12
Percentage	61.29%	38.71%
Seat	Ascot	Warren
Deputy Leader before election
David Evans
Elected Deputy Leader
Mal Bryce

A leadership spill of the Western Australian Labor Party occurred on 18 September 1981. A motion that all caucus positions be declared vacant was carried 18 votes to 13. Brian Burke defeated party leader Ron Davies 20 votes to 11, making Burke the leader of the party and the leader of the opposition in Western Australia. Mal Bryce defeated deputy party leader David Evans 19 votes to 12, making Bryce the deputy leader of the party and the deputy leader of the opposition in Western Australia. The Labor Party went on to win the 1983 state election, and Burke and Bryce continued in their positions for five years after the election before resigning.

== Background ==
Over the 1970s, the Western Australian Labor Party failed to come close to defeating the Liberal/National Country Coalition led by Charles Court. Following the 1980 state election, Labor MPs Brian Burke, Arthur Tonkin, Mal Bryce, Jeff Carr and Bob Pearce formed a group to plan for the removal of Ron Davies as party leader and David Evans as deputy party leader. They had to decide between themselves who was going to nominate as leader. Bryce eventually gave way for Burke to nominate instead of himself, reasoning that Burke had better media and fundraising skills, necessary as the party was short on funds. Bryce told his followers to support Burke, who mostly went through with that. There was some trepidation however, with a few people seeing him as a risk. With both of them being supported by one third of Labor MPs each, the combined number was enough to win the leadership.

== Leadership spill ==
On 18 September 1981, at a party room meeting, a motion that all caucus positions be declared vacant was carried 18 votes to 13. Burke defeated Davies for the leadership election 20 votes to 11, and so he became the leader of the opposition. Bryce was elected deputy leader of the Labor Party 19 votes to 12, so became the deputy leader of the opposition. At 34 years old, Burke was the fourth youngest ever opposition leader of Western Australia.

== Aftermath ==
The Labor Party went on to win the 1983 state election, and Burke served for five years as Premier of Western Australia before resigning.

== See also ==
- Burke shadow ministry
