= Electoral results for the district of Beeloo =

Western Australian district election results

This is a list of electoral results for the Electoral district of Beeloo in Western Australian state elections.

== Members for Beeloo ==
Member	Party	Term
Colin Jamieson	Labor	1956–1968

== Election results ==
=== Elections in the 1960s ===
1965 Western Australian state election: Beeloo
Party	Candidate	Votes	%	±%
Labor	Colin Jamieson	6,440	60.1	+1.5
Liberal and Country	Henry Watson	4,271	39.9	+6.0
Total formal votes		10,711	95.9	−2.1
Informal votes		463	4.1	+2.1
Turnout		11,174	92.3	−1.4
Labor hold		Swing	+0.4	

1962 Western Australian state election: Beeloo
Party	Candidate	Votes	%	±%
Labor	Colin Jamieson	5,942	58.6	
Liberal and Country	William How	3,436	33.9	
Democratic Labor	Philip De Lacey	758	7.5	
Total formal votes		10,136	98.0	
Informal votes		202	2.0	
Turnout		10,338	93.7	
Two-party-preferred result
Labor	Colin Jamieson		59.7	
Liberal and Country	William How		40.3	
Labor hold		Swing		

- Two party preferred vote was estimated.

=== Elections in the 1950s ===
1959 Western Australian state election: Beeloo
Party	Candidate	Votes	%	±%
Labor	Colin Jamieson	6,067	52.3	−14.5
Liberal and Country	Gordon Clark	4,798	41.4	+8.2
Democratic Labor	Patrick Riordan	735	6.3	+6.3
Total formal votes		11,600	97.3	+0.5
Informal votes		326	2.7	−0.5
Turnout		11,926	92.4	−0.6
Two-party-preferred result
Labor	Colin Jamieson		53.3	−13.5
Liberal and Country	Gordon Clark		46.7	+13.5
Labor hold		Swing	−13.5	

- Two party preferred vote was estimated.

1956 Western Australian state election: Beeloo
Party	Candidate	Votes	%	±%
Labor	Colin Jamieson	6,418	66.8	
Liberal and Country	John Alden	3,186	33.2	
Total formal votes		9,604	96.8	
Informal votes		316	3.2	
Turnout		9,920	93.0	
Labor hold		Swing		
