= 1971 Ascot state by-election =

A by-election for the seat of Ascot in the Legislative Assembly of Western Australia was held on 13 November 1971. It was triggered by the death of Merv Toms, the serving Labor member and Speaker of the Legislative Assembly, on 8 October 1971.

Toms' death reduced Labor to a minority government, and David Brand, the opposition leader, threatened to bring on a motion of no confidence. Because of this, the premier, John Tonkin, controversially advised the governor, Sir Douglas Kendrew, to prorogue parliament until the by-election was held. A loss for the Labor Party was considered high unlikely and did not eventuate, although the party did suffer a heavy negative swing of 22.4 points on first preferences. The winning candidate, Mal Bryce, polled 53.4 percent of the vote, while the Liberal candidate, Fred Chaney, polled 41.6 percent of the vote, despite the party not having contested the seat at the 1971 state election.

== Background ==
Merv Toms had held Ascot for the Labor Party since the seat's creation at the 1968 state election, and had first been elected to parliament at the 1956 election. He was elected to the speakership after Labor's victory at the 1971 election, and due to the party's one-seat majority had to frequently exercise his casting vote. Toms died in office on 8 October 1971, with the writ for the by-election issued on 14 October and the close of nominations on 21 October. Polling day was on 13 November, with the writ returned on 30 November.

== Results ==
Ascot state by-election, 1971
Party	Candidate	Votes	%	±%
Labor	Mal Bryce	6,463	53.4	–22.4
Liberal	Fred Chaney	5,037	41.6	+41.6
Democratic Labor	Brian Burns	308	2.5	–21.7
Defence of Government Schools	James Kane	187	1.5	+1.5
Westralia	Graham Turner	101	0.8	+0.8
Total formal votes		12,096	97.4	+4.2
Informal votes		325	2.6	–4.2
Turnout		12,421	86.1	–5.3
Labor hold		Swing	n/a	

- No distribution of preferences was carried out, as the Labor candidate recorded an absolute majority on the first count.

== Aftermath ==
Bryce increased his majority at the 1974 state election, despite the Tonkin government being defeated. He became deputy premier under Brian Burke when Labor returned to power in 1983, serving until his retirement in 1988. Bryce's chief opponent at the by-election, Fred Chaney, was elected to the Senate at the 1974 federal election.

== See also ==
- 1932 Roebourne state by-election, held in similar circumstances
- 1973 Balcatta state by-election, held in similar circumstances
- List of Western Australian state by-elections
