= Electoral district of Marangaroo =

Former electoral district in Perth, Western Australia

Marangaroo Western Australia—Legislative Assembly
- State: Western Australia
- Dates current: 1989–1996
- Namesake: Marangaroo

Marangaroo was an electoral district of the Legislative Assembly in the Australian state of Western Australia from 1989 to 1996.

The district was based in Perth's northern suburbs. It was a safe Labor seat.

== History ==
Marangaroo was first created for the 1989 state election and abolished ahead of the 1996 state election. The seat's member during its two terms was Labor MP Ted Cunningham. Cunningham was previously the member for Balga, which was abolished when Marangaroo was created. He went on to represent the new district of Girrawheen, which largely replaced Marangaroo.

== Members for Marangaroo ==
Member	Party	Term
Ted Cunningham	Labor	1989–1996
