= Nick Catania =

Australian politician

Mayor of the City of Vincent
- In office 2001–2011

Member of the Western Australian Parliament for Balcatta
- In office 1989–1996
- Preceded by: Ron Bertram
- Succeeded by: seat abolished

Personal details
- Born: 18 December 1945 (age 80) Castell'Umberto, Sicily, Italy
- Party: WA Labor
- Children: Vince Catania; Steve Catania

Nicholas Mark Catania (born 18 December 1945) is a former Australian politician. Catania served as Mayor of the City of Vincent in inner-city Perth between 2001 and 2011. He was a member of the Western Australian Legislative Assembly for the Electoral district of Balcatta between 1989 and 1996.

Catania was born in Castell'Umberto, Sicily, Italy and is the father of Labor politician Steve Catania and National Party politician Vince Catania.
