= 1973 Balcatta state by-election =

A by-election for the seat of Balcatta in the Legislative Assembly of Western Australia was held on 28 July 1973. It was triggered by the resignation of Herb Graham, the deputy premier in the Labor government of John Tonkin, on 30 May 1973.

Like the earlier 1971 Ascot by-election, the Balcatta by-election was of great importance to the Labor Party, as a loss would have seen it reduced to minority government. The party retained the seat despite a 16.5-point negative swing, with Brian Burke (a future premier) outpolling the Liberal candidate, Neil Beck, by only 30 votes on the two-party-preferred count. Burke had been behind Beck on first preferences, but passed him after the preferences of the Australia Party candidate were distributed.

== Background ==
Herb Graham had held Balcatta for the Labor Party since the seat's re-creation at the 1962 state election, and had served in parliament since 1943. He was made deputy premier under John Tonkin following Labor's victory at the 1971 election, but the pair had frequent differences of opinion. Graham resigned from parliament on 30 May 1973 and was instead appointed chairman of the Licensing Court of Western Australia. After his resignation, the writ for the by-election was issued on 1 June, with the close of nominations on 28 June. Polling day was on 28 July, with the writ returned on 17 August.

On the same day that Graham announced his retirement, Brian Burke made his decision to seek Labor preselection for Balcatta. He faced an uphill battle, with state secretary Joe Chamberlain wanting Patricia Giles preselected. With the help of his brother Terry and a particularly good performance by Burke at a preselection meeting, he became Labor's candidate. As the Labor Party only had a one seat majority, the by-election would determine whether it would remain in office. Having undertaken an opinion poll of the seat, Burke realised he was most likely not going to win, so he asked acting state secretary Kim Beazley for money to fund his campaign. Beazley gave Burke's campaign $6,000, which was all the money in the party's electoral account, angering Chamberlain as the money was meant for the upcoming full state election. At the by-election, Burke defeated the Liberal Party candidate by 30 votes as measured on a two-party-preferred basis. He was sworn into parliament on 5 August 1973.

== Results ==
Balcatta state by-election, 1973
Party	Candidate	Votes	%	±%
Liberal	Neil Beck	9,178	49.0	+15.6
Labor	Brian Burke	9,075	48.5	–18.0
Australia	Wilfrid Campin	469	2.5	+2.5
Total formal votes		18,722	97.5	+2.9
Informal votes		478	2.5	–2.9
Turnout		19,200	80.7	–19.3
Two-party-preferred result
Labor	Brian Burke	9,376	50.1	–16.5
Liberal	Neil Beck	9,346	49.9	+16.5
Labor hold		Swing	–16.5	

== Aftermath ==
The Tonkin government was defeated at the 1974 state election, which also saw Balcatta abolished in a redistribution. Burke transferred to the seat of Balga, and remained in parliament until his retirement in 1988. He was elected leader of the Labor Party in 1981, and became premier at the 1983 state election.

== See also ==
- 1932 Roebourne state by-election, held in similar circumstances
- List of Western Australian state by-elections
