= Electoral district of Balga =

Former electoral district in Perth, Western Australia

Balga Western Australia—Legislative Assembly
- State: Western Australia
- Dates current: 1974–1977; 1983–1989
- Namesake: Balga

Balga was an electoral district of the Legislative Assembly in the Australian state of Western Australia from 1974 to 1977 and again from 1983 to 1989.

The district was based in Perth's northern suburbs and was a safe Labor seat.

== History ==
At the 1972 redistribution prior to the 1974 state election, the seat of Balcatta, held narrowly by Labor's Brian Burke after a 1973 by-election, was renamed Balga, and Burke won it with an increased majority. The name Balga would last only one term; the seat was renamed back to Balcatta ahead of the 1977 state election.

A new seat of Balga which was significantly safer for Labor was created for the 1983 state election east of the original seat. It included Alexander Heights, Balga, Girrawheen, Koondoola, Ballajura (at that stage only the section north of Marangaroo Drive had been built) and the eastern section of Hamersley. The seat's member was again Burke, who at that election also became Western Australian Premier. Burke resigned on 25 February 1988, both as Premier and a member of parliament, on the fifth anniversary of his swearing in as Premier. He was succeeded at a by-election by fellow Labor candidate Ted Cunningham.

Balga was abolished ahead of the 1989 state election, and was replaced by the new seat of Marangaroo, which Cunningham went on to represent.

== Members for Balga ==
Balga (1974–1977)
Member	Party	Term
Brian Burke	Labor	1974–1977
Balga (1983–1989)
Member	Party	Term
Brian Burke	Labor	1983–1988
Ted Cunningham	Labor	1988–1989
