= Ted Cunningham =

Australian politician

Edward Joseph Cunningham (26 November 1937 – 2 November 2003) was an Australian politician.

Cunningham was born in Clayfield in Brisbane and arrived in Western Australia in 1971. Before entering politics he was a marketing manager and public servant. In 1988 he was elected to the Western Australian Legislative Assembly in a by-election as the Labor member for Balga; he moved to the new seat of Marangaroo in 1989 and to Girrawheen in 1996. Although he never held a front bench position, he was President of the Parliamentary Labor Party from 1994 to 1997 and Opposition Whip from 1997 to 2001, when he retired.

Cunningham died on 2 November 2003 at the age of 65 after a short illness.

Western Australian Legislative Assembly
Preceded by Brian Burke	Member for Balga; 1988–1989	Abolished
New seat	Member for Marangaroo; 1989–1996	Abolished
New seat	Member for Girrawheen; 1996–2001	Succeeded by Margaret Quirk
