= Ron Bertram =

Australian politician

Attorney-General of Western Australia
- In office 3 March – 30 September 1971
- Preceded by: Arthur Griffith
- Succeeded by: Tom Evans

Member of the Western Australian Legislative Assembly
- In office 23 March 1968 – 19 February 1983
- Preceded by: Bill Hegney
- Succeeded by: None (abolished)
- Constituency: Mount Hawthorn
- In office 19 February 1983 – 4 February 1989
- Preceded by: Brian Burke
- Succeeded by: Nick Catania
- Constituency: Balcatta

Personal details
- Born: 22 June 1924 Inglewood, Western Australia
- Died: 17 November 2014 (aged 90) West Leederville, Western Australia
- Party: Labor

Ronald Edward Bertram (22 June 1924 – 17 November 2014) was an Australian lawyer and politician who was a Labor Party member of the Legislative Assembly of Western Australia from 1968 to 1989. He briefly served as a minister in the government of John Tonkin.

Bertram was born in Perth to Maude (née Bennett) and Walter Bertram. He enlisted in the Australian Imperial Force in June 1943, and saw service in New Guinea during the war. Bertram was discharged from the army in 1946, and subsequently worked as an accountant. He later studied law part-time, and was called to the bar in 1954, allowing him to practise as a barrister. Bertram first ran for parliament at the 1965 state election. He contested the newly created North Metropolitan Province, but was defeated by Arthur Griffith of the Liberal Party. Bertram eventually entered parliament at the 1968 state election, replacing the retiring Bill Hegney in the seat of Mount Hawthorn.

Bertram was re-elected at the 1971 state election, which saw a Labor victory, and was then appointed Attorney-General and Minister for Railways in the new ministry formed by John Tonkin. However, he resigned from cabinet after just under seven months in office, due to ill health. He was the shortest-serving state attorney-general since Frederick Moorhead in 1901. Following Labor's defeat at the 1974 state election, Bertram was included in Labor's Tonkin shadow cabinet. He remained a member until 1980, serving under three leaders of the opposition (John Tonkin, Colin Jamieson, and Ron Davies). At the 1983 election, the seat of Mount Hawthorn was abolished, and Bertram successfully transferred to the seat of Balcatta, which he held until his retirement at the 1989 election. He died in Perth in November 2014, aged 90.

Parliament of Western Australia
Preceded by Bill Hegney	Member for Mount Hawthorn; 1968–1983	Abolished
Preceded by Brian Burke	Member for Balcatta; 1983–1989	Succeeded by Nick Catania
Political offices
Preceded by Arthur Griffith	Attorney-General; 1971	Succeeded by Tom Evans
Preceded by Ray O'Connor	Minister for Railways; 1971	Succeeded by Jerry Dolan
