= Ken McIver =

Australian politician

Kenneth Finlay McIver (26 October 1928 – 27 September 1988) was an Australian politician who served in the Parliament of Western Australia between 1968 and 1988. He represented Northam and Avon for the Labor Party. Prior to entering politics, McIver spent over 20 years as a train driver with the Western Australian Government Railways (WAGR). When the Fremantle line reopened in 1983, McIver drove the first passenger train along the line with Premier Brian Burke in the driver's cab with him. In recognition of his service to the WAGR and the parliament, McIver railway station was named in his honour.
