= Terry Burke =

Australian politician

Member of the Western Australian Legislative Assembly
- In office 23 March 1968 – 18 March 1987
- Preceded by: Peter Durack
- Succeeded by: Ian Alexander
- Constituency: Perth

Personal details
- Born: Terence Joseph Burke; 1 February 1942 (age 84) Perth, Western Australia, Australia
- Party: Labor Party
- Spouse: Luciana Mary Sepich
- Children: 4
- Parents: Tom Burke (father); Madeline Orr (mother)
- Relatives: Brian Burke (brother)
- Profession: Public servant

Terence Joseph Burke (born 1 February 1942) is a former member for the seat of Perth in the Western Australian Legislative Assembly. He held the seat between 1968 and 1987. In 1974, with the Labor Party in Opposition, he was a member of the Tonkin shadow ministry. He is the elder brother of former premier Brian Burke and both are sons of former federal shadow cabinet member Tom Burke.

== Early life ==
Burke was born on 1 February 1942 in Perth, Western Australia. His parents were Tom Burke, an Australian Labor Party politician in the House of Representatives from 1943 to 1955, and Madeline Muirson Orr. Tom Burke had Irish ancestry, and was deeply Catholic. Madeline Orr was of Irish and Scottish ancestry. Terry Burke was the first child out of five: the second child was Anne Burke, the third child was Brian Burke, the fourth child was Frankie Burke, who had down syndrome, and the fifth child was Genevieve Burke. He grew up in the middle-class Perth suburb of Wembley, living in a California bungalow set on a quarter acre block.

== Political career ==
Burke joined the Labor Party in 1958. At the 1968 Western Australian state election, he was elected to the electoral district of Perth in the Legislative Assembly. His brother Brian was elected to the electoral district of Balcatta in a 1973 by-election.

Following Labor's 1974 election loss, Burke became a member of the Tonkin shadow ministry. He was the shadow chief secretary, shadow minister for conservation and the environment, and shadow minister for fisheries and fauna until April 1977. His brother became the premier of Western Australia after the 1983 state election.

On 18 March 1987, Burke resigned from parliament.

He was later found to be involved in events related to the WA Inc scandal. A royal commission found that Burke had received a $600,000 commission for fundraising campaign donations paid to his brother and the Labor Party during the 1987 federal election.

== Personal life ==
Burke is Catholic. He married Luciana Mary Sepich on 12 March 1966 at Sacred Heart Church in Highgate. He has two sons and two daughters.

== See also ==
- Political families of Australia
