= Electoral district of Welshpool =

Former electoral district in Perth, Western Australia

Welshpool Western Australia—Legislative Assembly
- State: Western Australia
- Dates current: 1974–1989
- Namesake: Welshpool

Welshpool was an electoral district of the Legislative Assembly in the Australian state of Western Australia from 1974 to 1989.

The district was based in the south-eastern suburbs of Perth. First contested at the 1974 state election, its first member was Colin Jamieson, hitherto the member for Belmont. Jamieson was leader of the Labor Party from 1976 to 1978 and remained the seat's member until 1986.

He was succeeded by another Labor MP in Bill Thomas, who became the member for Cockburn after Welshpool was abolished at the 1989 state election.

== Members for Welshpool ==
Member	Party	Term
Colin Jamieson	Labor	1974–1986
Bill Thomas	Labor	1986–1989
