= Electoral district of Ascot =

Former state electoral district of Perth, Western Australia

Ascot Western Australia—Legislative Assembly
- State: Western Australia
- Dates current: 1968–1989
- Namesake: Ascot

Ascot was an electoral district of the Legislative Assembly in the Australian state of Western Australia from 1968 to 1989.

The district was based in the eastern suburbs of Perth. First contested at the 1968 state election, its first member was Merv Toms, hitherto the member for Bayswater, who finished his career as Speaker of the Assembly. He died on 8 October 1971 while exercising his casting vote for the Government on the floor of the Assembly, where the Government and Opposition were evenly divided.

At the resulting by-election, 28-year-old schoolteacher Mal Bryce was elected. Bryce, who later served as Deputy Premier to Brian Burke in the Burke Ministry, held the seat until his resignation in 1988. Eric Ripper won the seat in the ensuing by-election, and became the member for Belmont after Ascot was abolished at the 1989 state election.

The seat was held at all times by members of the Labor Party.

== Members for Ascot ==
| Member | Party | Term |
|---|---|---|
| Merv Toms | Labor | 1968–1971 |
| Mal Bryce | Labor | 1971–1988 |
| Eric Ripper | Labor | 1988–1989 |
