= Ron Davies (Western Australian politician) =

Australian politician

Leader of the Opposition in Western Australia
- In office 21 February 1978 – 18 September 1981
- Deputy: Mal Bryce; David Evans
- Preceded by: Colin Jamieson
- Succeeded by: Brian Burke

Member of the Western Australian Legislative Assembly
- In office 26 August 1961 – 16 April 1986
- Preceded by: Hugh Andrew
- Succeeded by: Geoff Gallop
- Constituency: Victoria Park

Personal details
- Born: 11 April 1926 North Perth, Western Australia, Australia
- Died: 24 July 2011 (aged 85) St James, Western Australia, Australia
- Party: Labor
- Spouse: Frances McGlew (m. 1970)
- Profession: Railway worker

Ronald Davies (11 April 1926 – 24 July 2011) was an Australian politician, who was a Labor Party member of the Western Australian Legislative Assembly for the electoral district of Victoria Park from 1961 to 1986.

Born in 1926, Davies was a union official for the Western Australian Railway Officers' Union before he was elected to the Western Australian parliament in a by-election for Victoria Park in 1961. He became a member of cabinet in 1971, going on to hold such ministerial portfolios as Health, Environment, Multicultural and Ethnic Affairs, Arts, and Forests, Conservation and Land Management in the Tonkin Ministry. In 1974, with the Labor Party in Opposition, he was a member of the Tonkin Shadow Ministry.

In 1978, the Labor Party elected him as party leader in Western Australia and he served as Leader of the Opposition until he was ousted by Brian Burke in a leadership spill on 18 September 1981. The year before his deposition, he had led the ALP to defeat by Sir Charles Court's reigning Liberal Party at a state election.

Davies retired from parliament in 1986. He served as Agent-General for Western Australia in London from 1986 to 1990. He died in July 2011.

Western Australian Legislative Assembly
| Preceded by Hugh Andrew | Member for Victoria Park; 1961–1986 | Succeeded by Geoff Gallop |
Political offices
| Preceded by Colin Jamieson | Leader of the Opposition; 1978–1981 | Succeeded by Brian Burke |
Party political offices
| Preceded by Colin Jamieson | Leader of the Labor Party in Western Australia; 1978–1981 | Succeeded by Brian Burke |
Diplomatic posts
| Preceded by Ron Douglas | Agent-General for Western Australia; 1986–1990 | Succeeded by David Fischer |
