= Mal Bryce =

Australian politician (1943–2018)

The Honourable Mal Bryce AO

Deputy Premier of Western Australia
- In office 25 February 1983 – 25 February 1988
- Premier: Brian Burke
- Preceded by: Cyril Rushton
- Succeeded by: David Parker

Deputy Leader of the Western Australian Labor Party
- In office February 1977 – February 1980
- Leader: Ron Davies
- Preceded by: David Evans
- Succeeded by: David Evans
- In office 18 September 1981 – 25 February 1988
- Leader: Brian Burke
- Preceded by: David Evans
- Succeeded by: David Parker

Member of the Western Australian Legislative Assembly
- In office 13 November 1971 – 18 February 1988
- Preceded by: Merv Toms
- Succeeded by: Eric Ripper
- Constituency: Ascot

Personal details
- Born: Malcolm John Bryce; 10 April 1943 Bunbury, Western Australia
- Died: 3 March 2018 (aged 74) Perth, Western Australia
- Party: Labor
- Education: University of Western Australia

Malcolm John Bryce AO (10 April 1943 – 3 March 2018) was an Australian politician, who served as a Labor Party member of the Western Australian Legislative Assembly from 1971 to 1988, representing the electoral district of Ascot. He was the deputy leader of the Labor Party from 1977 to 1980 and from 1981 to 1988, and served as deputy premier under Brian Burke from 1983 to 1988.

== Personal life ==
Bryce was born in Bunbury, Western Australia, to Ruth Lucy (née Gibson) and Eric John Bryce. He attended Bunbury Senior High School before going on to study teaching at Claremont Teachers College and the University of Western Australia in Perth, graduating with a Bachelor of Arts degree. Before entering politics, Bryce taught Economics, Geography and History at secondary level, spending periods at Merredin Senior High School, Bunbury Senior High School, and John Forrest Senior High School.

Bryce married fellow Claremont Teachers College alumna Elizabeth (née Lathwell) in 1965. They had four children.

== Political career ==
Bryce joined the Australian Labor Party (ALP) as a member of the University of WA Branch in 1961. He held a variety of positions in ALP Branches, Electorate Councils, and the State Executive of the Western Australian ALP during the 1960s.

Bryce stood unsuccessfully as endorsed ALP candidate for the House of Representatives Division of Moore in the 1966 Australian federal election, and as an ALP Senate Candidate for Western Australia in the 1970 Australian Senate election.

At the age of 28, Bryce was elected to the state Legislative Assembly at the 1971 Ascot by-election caused by the death of Merv Toms (the serving Speaker of the Legislative Assembly), and held the seat continuously until his resignation from State Parliament in 1988. In 1974, with the Labor Party in Opposition, he was a member of the Tonkin Shadow Ministry. During the 1970s Bryce served the ALP as a member of the National Executive (1971–79), National Vice President (1976–77) Western Australian Vice President (1974–76), and WA State President (1977–79).

In 1983 Bryce was appointed Deputy Premier of Western Australia under Premier Brian Burke, serving until his and Burke's resignations from parliament in 1988. Unlike Burke, Bryce was not embroiled in the WA Inc scandal.

As Deputy Premier and Minister for Economic Development and Technology, Industry, Small Business, Defence Liaison and Parliamentary and Electoral Reform, Bryce was responsible for establishing a number of institutions, including Australia's first government Department of Computing and Information Technology (DOCIT), the Western Australian Technology Park, the Western Australian SciTech Discovery Centre, the Institute for Science and Technology Policy and the Chair of Bio Technology at Murdoch University, and the Western Australian Small Business Development Corporation. He was instrumental in legislating the Western Australian Technology and Industry Development Act, and the Electoral Reform Bill of 1987, a comprehensive reform of the Western Australian Parliamentary System.

== Post-politics ==
After leaving parliament, Bryce worked as a Company Director, Corporate Manager, Management Consultant, Project Leader, Digital Strategist, Author and Public Speaker. His career focussed on developing companies, communities and public policy to harness the power of Information and Communications Technology.

Throughout the 1990s Bryce was a leading Australian pioneer in the development of the Internet industry, and the application of the Internet to business, government agencies and communities. He was the architect of Australia's first (and one of the world's first) Internet enabled online communities in Ipswich Queensland (1993), and he led the team that implemented Australia's first community driven eCommerce Project. His book Australia’s First Online Community (2010) is a case study in IT led Economic Development.

During the 1990s, Bryce served as Chairman of the Western Australian Technology and Industry Advisory Council, Chairman of the Australian Centre for Innovation and International Competitiveness (Sydney University), Foundation Co-Chairman of the Australian Greenhouse Information Service (Melbourne), worked as an ICT Management Consultant with Deloittes Ross Tomhatsu, and a director of Bankwest. He was a member of the Prime Minister's Science and Engineering Council, a Chairman or Director of six ICT/science based companies in Australia and the US, and a Foundation Fellow of the Australian Institute of Company Directors.

Since 2001, Bryce served as Chairman of iVEC (2003–2013), the Pawsey Supercomputer Project at Technology Park in Perth Western Australia, the Western Australian ICT Industry Development Forum, the Western Australian Tele-Centre Advisory Council, and the Governing Council of Perth Central TAFE. In his roles at iVEC and the Pawsey Supercomputer Project, Bryce was involved in developing the Supercomputing and eResearch Infrastructure components of the Australian ICT sector. iVEC is a keystone of Australia's participation in the Square Kilometre Array research project, a radio telescope based in Western Australia and South Africa, and one of the largest and most ambitious international science projects ever undertaken.

Bryce was a member of the Australian eResearch Infrastructure Council (AeRIC), and the Australian Square Kilometre Array Project (ASKAP) Steering Committee, Director of Yilgarn Infrastructure Ltd., Senior Associate of the Australian Centre for Innovation and International Competitiveness (Sydney), and Adjunct Professor of Public Policy at Curtin University.

Bryce died aged 74 on 3 March 2018.

== Honours ==
Bryce was made an Officer of the Order of Australia in 1989 for services to the WA parliament. He was admitted as a Foundation Fellow of the Australian Institute of Company Directors in 1990, was awarded an Honorary Doctorate of Technology at Curtin University in 1994, and an Honorary Life Membership of the Australian Computer Society in 2011. In August 2012 he was awarded the Pearcey National Medal, and inducted into the Australian ICT Industry Hall of Fame "In recognition of a distinguished lifetime achievement and contribution to the development and growth of the Australian Information and Communications Technology Industry". In 2013 he was elected as a Fellow in the World Academy of Productivity Science.

== See also ==
- 1981 Western Australian Labor Party leadership spill

Political offices
Preceded by Cyril Rushton	Deputy Premier of Western Australia; 1983–1988	Succeeded by David Parker
Western Australian Legislative Assembly
Preceded by Merv Toms	Member for Ascot; 1971–1988	Succeeded by Eric Ripper
