= Colin Jamieson =

Australian politician (1923–1990)

Colin Jamieson AO JP
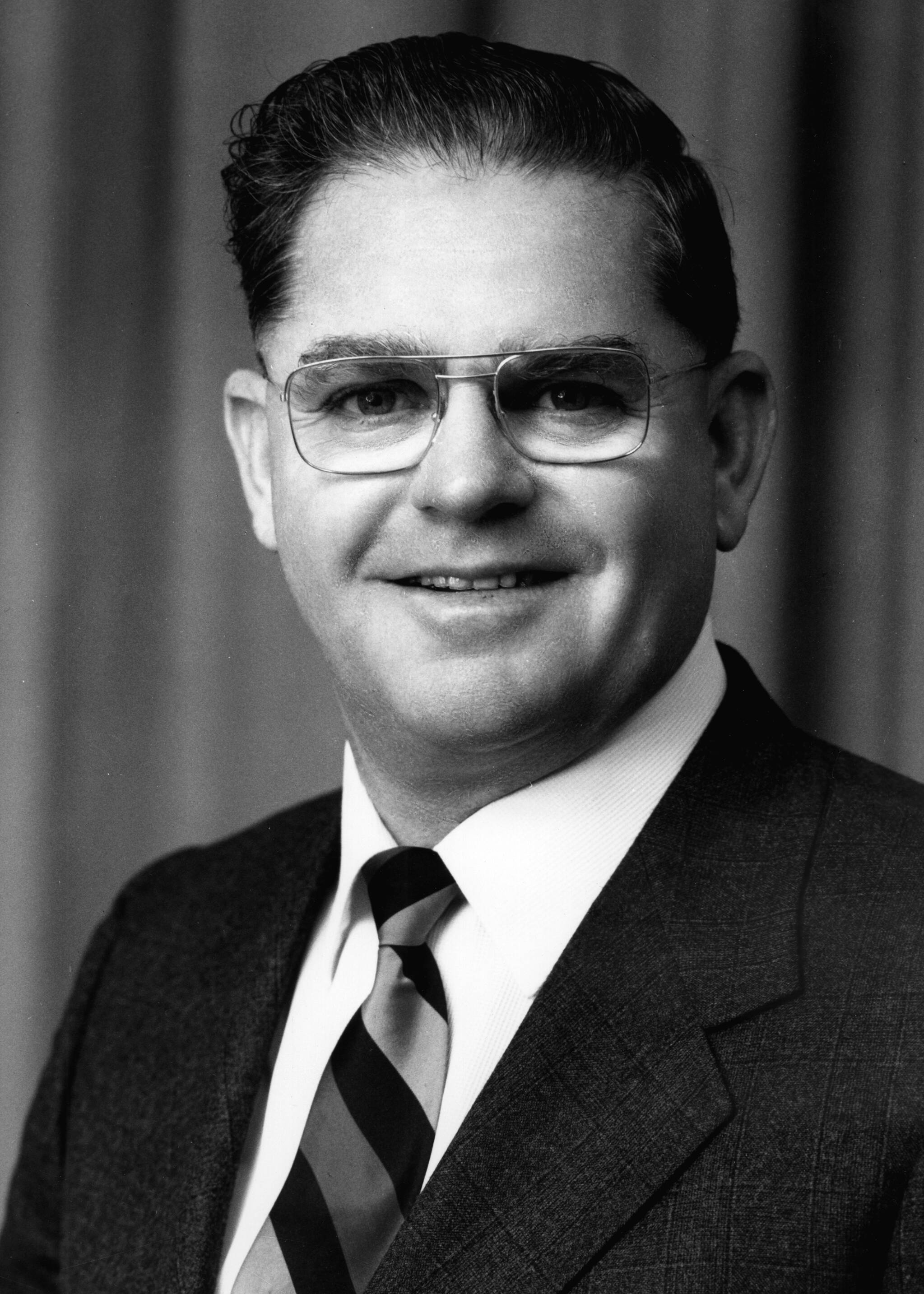
- Jamieson in 1973

Leader of the Opposition in Western Australia
- In office 14 April 1976 – 21 February 1978
- Deputy: David Evans; Mal Bryce
- Preceded by: John Tonkin
- Succeeded by: Ron Davies

Member of the Western Australian Legislative Assembly
- In office 14 February 1953 – 8 February 1986
- Constituency: Canning (1953–1956); Beeloo (1956–1968); Belmont (1968–1974); Welshpool (1974–1986)

Personal details
- Born: 26 May 1923 Perth, Western Australia
- Died: 27 March 1990 (aged 66) Subiaco, Western Australia
- Party: Labor
- Spouse: Emily Male (m. 1960)
- Profession: Carpenter and joiner

Colin John Jamieson (26 May 1923 – 27 March 1990) was an Australian politician. He was the leader of the opposition and state leader of the Australian Labor Party (ALP) in Western Australia from 1976 to 1978. He led the party to defeat at the 1977 state election. He was a member of the Western Australian Legislative Assembly from 1953 to 1986 and held ministerial office in the Tonkin ministry from 1971 to 1974.

== Early life ==
The son of George Archibald Jamieson, a vineyard employee and World War I veteran, and nurse Mona Colvin, Colin Jamieson was born in Perth on 26 May 1923. His grandfather, Archibald ("Scottie"), originated from the Orkney Islands, was involved in the creation of the Midland Railway Workers Union and was mayor of Midland Junction Municipality in 1914–1915. At age five, Jamieson's mother died of septicaemia arising from complications from the birth of his brother, and from then on he was looked after by aunts and then by his maternal grandparents. He attended Midland, Victoria Park and Leederville primary schools, and the Junior Technical College in West Perth.

Completing his formal education at 15, he worked at the Metropolitan Markets as an assistant fruit and produce merchant, then at a motor body works with the intention of becoming apprenticed, before enlisting in the Australian Imperial Force on 30 July 1942. He was assigned to the 121 Reserve Motor Transport Company with the rank of Corporal, transferring to the Royal Australian Air Force in 1944 as a radar mechanic with the rank of Leading Aircraftman. After discharge in April 1946, Jamieson worked first as a labourer and storeman at the Midland Railway Workshops, and became active in union matters until leaving the company to train as a carpenter and joiner under an ex-serviceman's scheme.

== Political career ==
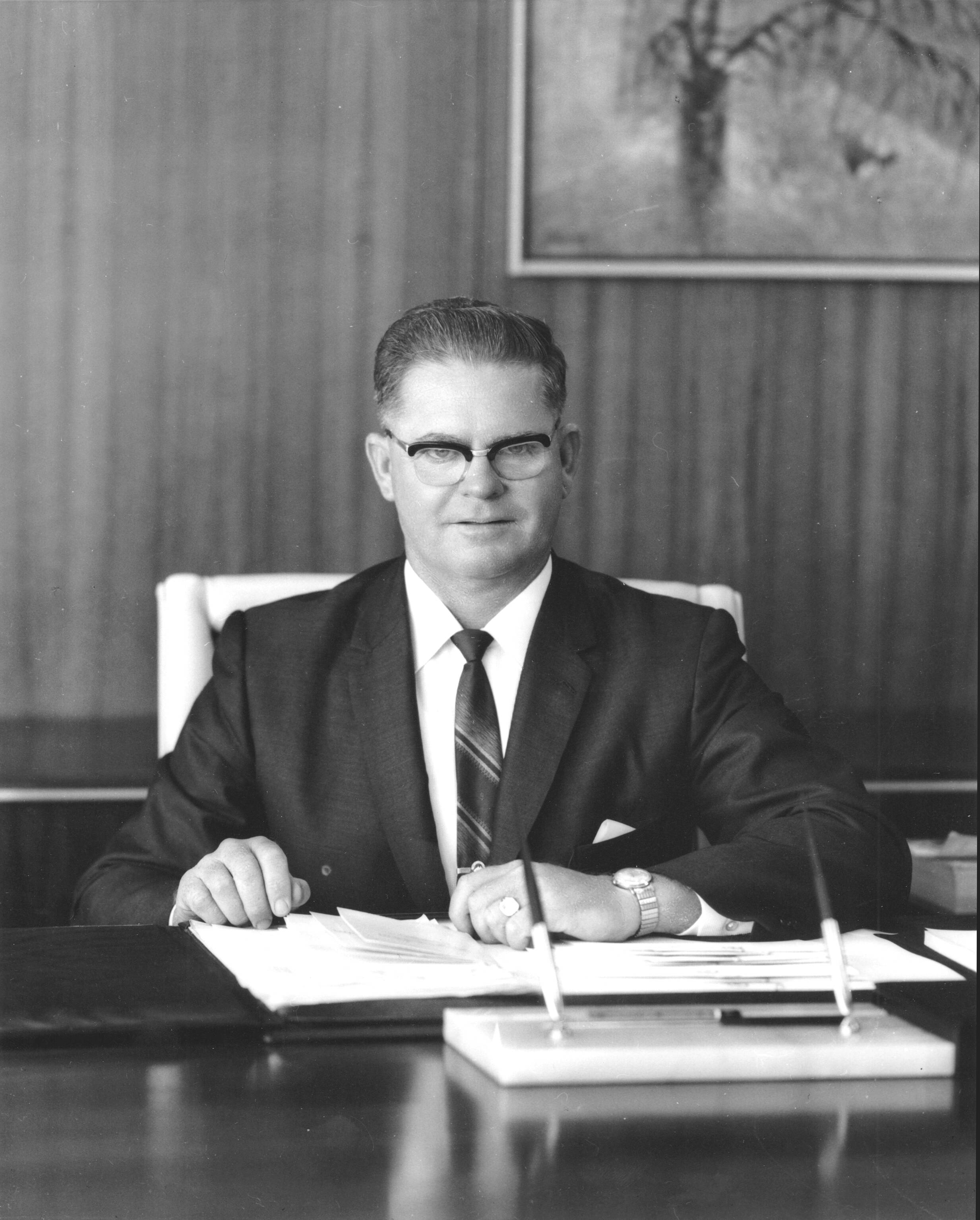
Jamieson c. 1971

Jamieson joined the ALP in 1946. He was elected to the Western Australian Legislative Assembly at the 1953 state election, winning the seat of Canning from the incumbent Liberal MP Arthur Griffith. He was 29 years old at the time of his election, making him the youngest member of the assembly. Jamieson transferred to Beeloo in 1956, to Belmont in 1968, and to Welshpool in 1974.

Jamieson was state president of the ALP from 1959 to 1976. He held ministerial office in John Tonkin's government from 1971 to 1974, serving as minister for works and water supplies and also briefly holding the electricity and traffic safety portfolios. He was elected deputy leader in 1974. He became "father of the house" in 1977 as the longest-serving incumbent MP and remained in parliament until his retirement at the 1986 state election.

=== Opposition leadership ===
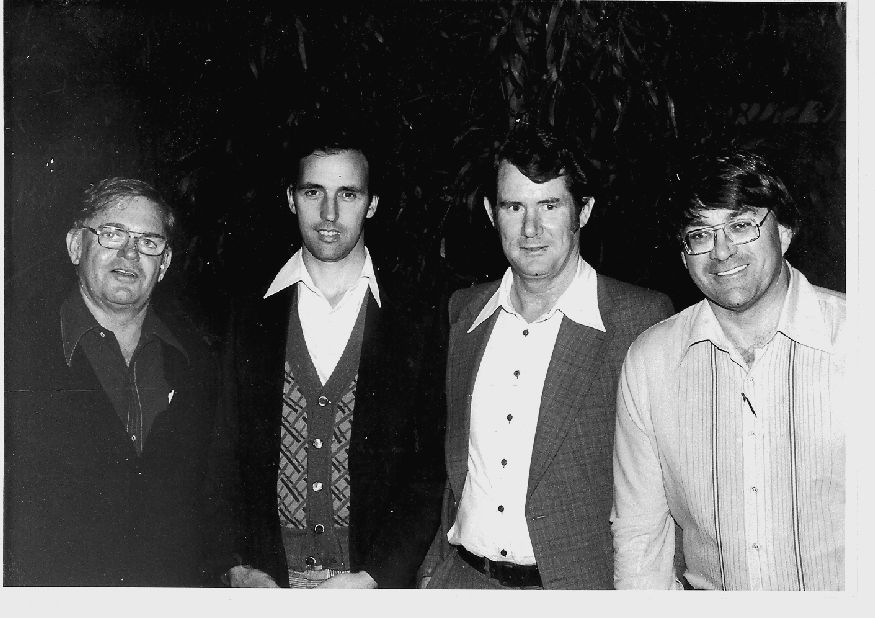
Jamieson (on left) with Labor figures Paul Keating, Peter Walsh and David Combe in 1979.

On 25 March 1976, Jamieson was elected to replace Tonkin as party leader and leader of the opposition with effect from 15 April. He defeated David Evans by a single vote in the leadership vote; Evans was then elected deputy leader.

At the 1977 state election, Jamieson campaigned on a platform which included the establishment of a state development council (chaired by the premier and with nominees from mining companies, other industries, and trade unions), the creation of a Remote Areas Commission with special funding available, and an inquiry into industrial unrest in the Pilbara. The ALP saw its first-preference vote drop by four points, although there was no change in its number of seats. After the election, Jamieson narrowly survived a leadership spill in March 1977. He again defeated Evans by a single vote after the elimination of three other candidates. Evans was then replaced as deputy leader by Mal Bryce.

On 21 February 1978, Jamieson faced a further leadership spill and was defeated by Ron Davies by 15 votes to 10. He was the shortest-serving ALP leader in Western Australia since 1905. It was reported that younger Labor MPs had supported Davies and considered Jamieson to be a poor media performer in relation to Liberal leader Charles Court. Bryce and his ally Brian Burke were among those who pushed for Jamieson's ouster, while Jamieson's support primarily came from the Trades and Labour Council.

== Personal life ==
On 14 May 1960, Jamieson married Emily Margaret Male at the Holy Family Church in Como, with Ron Davies in attendance as best man. The couple had two children, a son and a daughter.

Jamieson was heavily involved in community service throughout his life – particularly amateur football whose state organisation he served from 1947 until 1986 as an executive member and later as president, although he was also a keen tennis player. In 1971, he was presented by a Certificate of Merit from the National Football League for his services to amateur football. He also supported several horticultural societies, and was a regular and successful exhibitor of roses, dahlias and chrysanthemums.

After his retirement from politics in 1986, he served as chairman of the Metropolitan Cemeteries Board and Fremantle Cemeteries Board. In 1988, he was awarded the Order of Australia for his services to the Western Australian Parliament and the community. He died at St John of God Hospital, Subiaco, on 27 March 1990 after a short illness, and was cremated in Karrakatta Cemetery. A drive within Fremantle Cemetery and a road within the industrial suburb of Welshpool on the former site of the Main Roads depot were named in his honour.

Parliament of Western Australia
Preceded by John Tonkin	Leader of the Labor Party; 1976 – 1978	Succeeded by Ron Davies
Preceded by John Tonkin	Opposition Leader; 1976 – 1978	Succeeded by Ron Davies
