= Brian Burke (Australian politician) =

Australian politician (born 1947)

The Honourable Brian Burke

23rd Premier of Western Australia
- In office 25 February 1983 – 25 February 1988
- Monarch: Elizabeth II
- Governor: Richard Trowbridge; Gordon Reid
- Deputy: Mal Bryce
- Preceded by: Ray O'Connor
- Succeeded by: Peter Dowding

Treasurer of Western Australia
- In office 25 February 1983 – 25 February 1988
- Premier: Himself
- Preceded by: Ray O'Connor
- Succeeded by: Peter Dowding

Leader of the Opposition
- In office 18 September 1981 – 19 February 1983
- Deputy: Mal Bryce
- Preceded by: Ron Davies
- Succeeded by: Ray O'Connor

Leader of the Western Australian Labor Party
- In office 18 September 1981 – 25 February 1988
- Deputy: Mal Bryce
- Preceded by: Ron Davies
- Succeeded by: Peter Dowding

Member of the Western Australian Legislative Assembly
- In office 19 February 1983 – 25 February 1988
- Preceded by: Constituency re-established
- Succeeded by: Ted Cunningham
- Constituency: Balga
- In office 19 February 1977 – 25 February 1983
- Preceded by: Constituency re-established
- Succeeded by: Ron Bertram
- Constituency: Balcatta
- In office 30 March 1974 – 19 February 1977
- Preceded by: Constituency established
- Succeeded by: Constituency abolished
- Constituency: Balga
- In office 30 March 1973 – 30 March 1974
- Preceded by: Herb Graham
- Succeeded by: Constituency abolished
- Constituency: Balcatta

Personal details
- Born: Brian Thomas Burke; 25 February 1947 (age 79) Subiaco, Western Australia, Australia
- Party: Labor (1963–2006)
- Spouse: Suzanne May Nevill (m. 1965)
- Children: 6
- Parents: Tom Burke; Madeline Orr
- Relatives: Terry Burke (brother)
- Profession: Journalist, politician, lobbyist

Brian Thomas Burke (born 25 February 1947) is an Australian former politician who was the 23rd premier of Western Australia from 25 February 1983 to his resignation on 25 February 1988. He was a member of the Western Australian Legislative Assembly from 1973 to 1988, representing the electoral districts of Balga and Balcatta, and was the leader of the Western Australian Labor Party from 1981 to 1988.

Burke studied law at the University of Western Australia for one year before dropping out. During the 1960s and early 1970s, he worked as a journalist for The West Australian newspaper, 6PM radio station, and Seven News Perth. He was elected to Parliament at the 1973 Balcatta state by-election, becoming one of the most popular local members over the following years. In 1981, he became the leader of the Labor Party in a leadership spill. He led the Labor Party to victory in the 1983 Western Australian state election, defeating the Liberal–National government of Ray O'Connor.

Burke's achievements as Premier include the reopening of the Fremantle railway line, abolishing capital punishment, banning nuclear power, and implementing electoral reform. He was also at the centre of the WA Inc scandal, in which his cosy relationships with entrepreneurs led the state to losing hundreds of millions of dollars. This included providing a $150 million guarantee to the Rothwells bank following the October 1987 stock market crash. A year later, Rothwells went into liquidation. Burke resigned as Premier and as a member of Parliament exactly five years after taking office, still holding high popularity. He was succeeded by Peter Dowding, who went on to win the 1989 state election. In June 1988, he was appointed a Companion to the Order of Australia. Burke then became the Australian Ambassador to Ireland and the Australian Ambassador to the Holy See.

Burke resigned as an ambassador in 1991, having to face the WA Inc royal commission. The royal commission discovered that he had falsely claimed $17,000 from a parliamentary travel account between 1984 and 1986. In July 1994, he was sentenced to two years in prison, but was released on parole after seven months. In 1995, he was stripped of his Order of Australia honour. In 1997, he was found guilty of stealing $122,585 in campaign donations to the Labor Party, for which he was sentenced to three years jail, but served six months before the conviction was quashed on appeal. In the 2000s, Burke worked as a lobbyist in partnership with his former minister Julian Grill. A Crime and Corruption Commission (CCC) investigation revealed links with three state government ministers and several Labor Party staffers, who were forced to resign when this was revealed. In 2010, Burke was found guilty of giving a false testimony to the CCC, and fined $25,000.

== Early life and career ==
Burke was born on 25 February 1947 at St John of God Hospital, Subiaco, in the western suburbs of Perth, Western Australia. His parents were Tom Burke, an Australian Labor Party politician in the House of Representatives from 1943 to 1955, and Madeline Muirson Orr. Tom Burke had Irish ancestry, and was deeply Catholic. Madeline Orr was of Irish and Scottish ancestry. Brian Burke was the third child out of five: the first child was Terence Joseph "Terry" Burke, who also grew up to be a politician. He also had an older sister, a younger brother, and a younger sister. In his early years, Brian was quite independent as his parents focused on his younger brother Frank, who had down syndrome, and his father was often in Canberra. He grew up in the middle-class Perth suburb of Wembley, living in a California bungalow set on a quarter acre block. From 1952 to 1954, he was educated at Brigidine Primary School in Wembley, a Catholic school run by Irish nuns, and from 1955 to 1964, he was educated at St Joseph's Marist Brothers College in Subiaco.

Burke met his future wife Suzanne May Nevill at a school dance class when they were both 16. Several months later, they started going out, and on 11 September 1965, they married each other at St Francis Xavier's Church in East Perth. That year, he was studying law at the University of Western Australia (UWA), but he switched to part-time study when he got a job in September 1965 as a cadet proof-reader at West Australian Newspapers Ltd. with help from his father. For the following two years, he studied economics part-time at UWA, but he dropped out completely after that. In 1967, he became a cadet journalist for The West Australian, in 1969, he worked as a journalist for the 6PM radio station, and from 1970 to 1973, he worked for Seven News Perth. Whilst at The West Australian, Burke was assigned to collect horse race results at Gloucester Park. Seeing that there was no form guide being sold, he decided to start his own, forming the Punters' Guide with a group of university Labor branch members, including John Dawkins and Kim Beazley. Some of the profits raised went to the Labor Party. At the peak of its popularity, the Punters' Guide sold 16,000 copies. Meanwhile, Burke and his wife lived "on the bones of their arses" for several years, moving into a State Housing Commission home in 1970 before eventually being able to put a deposit on a home in Balga, a working-class suburb north of Perth. By the age of 24, Burke had three children.

== Political beginnings ==
Burke's brother Terry was elected to the Western Australian Legislative Assembly in 1968, representing the electoral district of Perth. In 1973, on the same day that Herb Graham, the deputy premier and member for Balcatta, announced his retirement from politics, Burke made his decision to seek Labor preselection for Balcatta. He faced an uphill battle, with state secretary Joe Chamberlain wanting Patricia Giles preselected. With the help of Terry and a particularly good performance by Burke at a preselection meeting, he became Labor's candidate for Balcatta. As the Labor Party only had a one-seat majority, the ensuing by-election would determine whether it would remain in office. Having undertaken an opinion poll of the seat, Burke realised he was most likely not going to win, so he asked acting state secretary Kim Beazley for money to fund his campaign. Beazley gave Burke's campaign $6,000, which was all the money in the party's electoral account, angering Chamberlain as the money was meant for the upcoming full state election. At the ensuing by-election on 28 July 1973, Burke defeated the Liberal Party candidate by 30 votes as measured on a two-party-preferred basis. He was sworn into Parliament on 5 August 1973.

Election results for Burke and the Labor Party
Election	Seat	Primary vote for Burke	Statewide Labor primary vote
1973	Balcatta	48.5%	—N/a
1974	Balga	62.0%	48.10%
1977	Balcatta	61.3%	44.22%
1980	Balcatta	68.7%	45.95%
1983	Balga	79.0%	53.16%
1986	Balga	77.8%	53.00%

At the 1974 state election on 30 March, he was elected to the newly created seat of Balga after Balcatta was abolished. At that election, the Labor Party led by John Tonkin lost their majority, and Charles Court from the Liberal Party became premier. Burke was one of the few Labor Party politicians to increase their vote at that election. Over the following five to six years, Burke had a low profile within the party, however he built up support in his electorate, with him eventually becoming one of the most popular local members ever. He became known as the "Godfather of Balga", although not in a pejorative way.

Burke would often come up with ideas for raising money for the Labor Party, including that the party start a printing press and open a Chinese restaurant. Other members of his branch would talk the ideas down. Many other people in the party would criticise Burke due to his unprofessional nature and lack of concern for policy development. He once spoke at a press conference whilst wearing a caftan. Another time, Burke suggested to Tonkin "...any business person looking for a government contract—you don’t get a contract unless you kick into (contribute to) the party." He was seen as a larrikin.

Instead of being part of any Labor Party factions, Burke chose to build alliances with others in the party from either faction. He was skilled at networking and attracting people to be loyal to him. In 1977, he was convicted of drink driving, dangerous driving, and failing to stop after an accident. He was fined $390 and had his driver's licence suspended for six months. His political career remained undamaged, and he decided to lose weight and give up alcohol.

Burke joined the shadow ministry in April 1977, being appointed by Labor leader Colin Jamieson as the shadow minister for works, water supplies, and housing. In March 1978, new Labor leader Ron Davies appointed Burke as the shadow minister for housing, and the chief secretary. From 7 March 1980, Burke was the shadow minister for water resources, housing, and consumer affairs.

In the late 1970s, Burke made several speeches opposing the Vietnamese boat people. He told the Daily News on 29 May 1978 that "these Vietnamese coming here in boats were not genuine refugees". On 23 August 1978, he said to Parliament "how many members of this House can say that all the refugees coming here are genuine? Can a refugee be defined as being genuine if they have the ability to commandeer a boat and come to this country?" In 1980, Burke began to prominently campaign against the death penalty. He made headlines by calling for public executions in places such as Forrest Place with the cabinet members responsible for the execution to be there.

== Path to premier ==
Over the 1970s, the Labor Party failed to come close to defeating the Liberal/National Country Coalition led by Charles Court. The Coalition had an advantage due to malapportionment favouring rural areas. After the 1977 election, Burke contested the Labor Party's deputy leadership, but was beaten by Mal Bryce by one vote. Following the 1980 election, Burke, Arthur Tonkin and Bryce began planning to remove Davies as party leader. With Tonkin never in serious leadership contention, Burke had to convince Bryce that he was the best man to lead the party. Bryce eventually came around for Burke, reasoning that Burke had better media and fundraising skills, necessary as the party was short on funds. Bryce told his followers to support Burke, who mostly went through with that. There was some trepidation however, with a few people seeing him as a risk. On 18 September 1981, Burke defeated Davies in a Labor Party leadership spill 20 votes to 11, and so he became the leader of the opposition. Bryce was elected deputy leader of the Labor Party and so he became the deputy leader of the opposition. He then appointed the Burke shadow ministry. Burke himself was appointed shadow treasurer and the shadow minister for immigration, ethnic affairs, economic affairs, federal affairs and aboriginal affairs. At 34 years old, Burke was the fourth-youngest ever opposition leader at the time. Upon becoming leader, Burke said to Bryce, "are we happy and agreed—I’m responsible for image and marketing; you’re responsible for policy and substance".

Following his ascension to the leadership of the Labor Party, Burke changed his demeanour. In an effort to remove his image as a larrikin, he asked a colleague to prepare a paper on the type of persona to show to the public. He lost weight and wore dark business suits. Burke took inspiration from populist American politician Huey Long, who had positioned himself as a champion of the poor. Beazley had given Burke a copy of Huey Long, a 1969 biography written by T. Harry Williams. Bryce said that "it was simply common practice for Burke to bring the biography into Parliament. It was the most read book I had ever seen him read over a long time working closely with him." Quentin Beresford posited in his biography, The godfather: the life of Brian Burke, that Burke saw similarities between himself and Long. They both came from large families, were skilled at manipulating people, did not have any fundamental political philosophy, and were entrepreneurial.

On 25 January 1982, Court retired from Parliament, and the Liberal Party elected Ray O'Connor as its leader. Leading into the 1983 state election, Western Australia was in a recession and interest rates were rising, affecting middle-class voters who would normally vote Liberal. Burke was a strong performer in the media, and O'Connor lacked leadership on many issues. The government was seen to have lost its way, with little to no policy on social issues such as abortion, divorce, and prostitution. In December 1982, O'Connor called the election for 19 February 1983. To O'Connor's dismay, Prime Minister Malcolm Fraser set the federal election two weeks after the state election. This was seen as an advantage to the state Labor Party, as the party's federal leader Bob Hawke, who was raised in Western Australia, was seen as more sympathetic to the state than the Liberal Prime Minister Fraser.

By mid-January, unemployment was up to 9.5%. Combatting unemployment became the main plank of Labor's campaign, with Burke saying that his aim was to "create an economic environment in which all those who sought full-time paid employment could find it". He promised during the campaign to set up a state unemployment taskforce at a cost of $34.5 million which reported to Cabinet. He also promised to reform the Legislative Council, which Labor had long criticised as undemocratic. This would include reducing the number of members from 34 to 22, which would require a referendum. Other commitments were to set up an inquiry into education conducted by former Federal Minister for Education Kim Beazley Sr., build an extra 1,500 state housing units using the funds from the sale of housing commission land, establish a Western Australian Development Bank to increase the amount of risk capital, reduce payroll tax and eventually abolish it, and set up a South East Asian Marketing Corporation to increase exports. To combat price increases, Burke promised to install a price commissioner and set a maximum limit on the price of petrol. In terms of rail transport, Burke reiterated an earlier promise to reopen the Perth to Fremantle passenger rail line, which was closed in 1979 by the Court Government as a result of poor patronage and the increasing cost to run it. The closure had attracted heavy opposition, with a petition calling for the closure to be reconsidered gaining 110,000 signatures. He also promised to electrify the line between Kwinana and Bunbury and improve passenger services between Perth and Bunbury. The main criticism the Liberal Party made of Labor's promises was that funding was not specified in most cases, and when it was, the funding was inadequate.

The election resulted in Labor recording a two-party-preferred vote of 54.4%, winning nine additional seats in the Legislative Assembly, giving them a majority of three. With a swing of 7.48%, the scale of Labor's victory surprised most people. Despite that, Labor won only seven out of the seventeen Legislative Council seats up for election. In his victory speech, he criticised the malapportionment of the Legislative Council.

== Premier ==
Burke and his ministry were sworn in by Governor Sir Richard Trowbridge on 25 February 1983. It was Burke's 36th birthday, making him the third youngest premier of Western Australia. Burke's ministry consisted of 15 men and no women. The size of his cabinet was criticised by O'Connor as hypocritical, who said that the Labor Party had criticised his own cabinet for being too large, creating extra cost. Three of the cabinet members had previously been a minister: Ron Davies and Dave Evans served in the Tonkin Ministry from 1971 to 1974 and Joe Berinson served in the Whitlam Ministry in 1975. The only member of the ministry who was not in Burke's shadow ministry was Peter Dowding, who had only been elected three years prior. Dowding replaced Mike Barnett, who did not nominate himself for the ministry due to family reasons. Burke himself had the roles of Treasurer, Minister Coordinating Economic and Social Development, Minister for Forests, Minister for Tourism, and Minister for Women's Interests. It was standard at the time for the premier to also be the treasurer and the minister coordinating economic and social development. This was the first time that women's interests was a ministry, and started a trend that lasted until 1992 that the premier hold that ministry whilst an assistant minister helps with the portfolio.

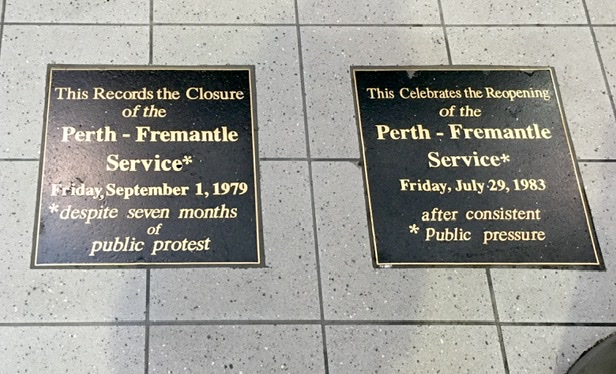
Signs at Perth railway station commemorating the closure and opening of the Fremantle line

A day after the election, Burke visited Fremantle to reassure residents that the line would be reopened. The line reopened on 29 July 1983, with Burke riding in the driver's cab with Works Minister and former train driver Ken McIver driving the first passenger train back on the line. The cost of repairing the line for reopening was $800,000 and the cost of the first year of operations was $800,000.

Two weeks after the election, Burke recalled Parliament to implement the promise to reduce prices.

Just prior to the 1983 election, Burke rang businessman Laurie Connell, and convinced him to donate $25,000 to the Labor Party. The two were introduced to each other by radio presenter Bob Maumill, a colleague of Burke when he worked at Seven News. Maumill had grown quite close to Burke. Maumill, and later Howard Sattler, hosted a weekly morning radio segment on 6PR called Ask the Premier, where Burke would answer listeners' questions.

As Tourism Minister, Burke chaired the Rottnest Island Board, where he met Dallas Dempster, an appointee by the previous Liberal government. When Burke won government, Dempster offered his resignation from the board, but Burke declined the offer. Burke later chose Dempster to become chairman of the board.

Early in his term as premier, Burke was approached by the developers of the Argyle diamond mine. They claimed to have an agreement with the O'Connor Government that their obligation to build a town at the mine would be waived if the coalition had won the 1983 election. Burke decided to allow the waiver to go ahead, provided that the government be compensated by $58 million. The government then spent $42 million to buy a 5% stake in the mine from Northern Mining, a company owned by Alan Bond. Burke later said "that showed me it (revenue raising) could be done. Bryce later said he saw the deal as the introduction of fly-in fly-out in Australia, saying that "the social implications [of the deal] are pretty ugly". Burke then held a meeting with several federal government MPs, including John Dawkins, Kim Beasley and Peter Walsh, where he pitched the idea of becoming a state capitalist to help with the state's financial situation. It was later revealed in the WA Inc royal commission that Connell was a paid advisor to both Burke and Bond during the deal's negotiations. The royal commission found that Burke had known about Connell advising Bond, but "deliberately chose not to tell his Cabinet colleagues. Such conduct is grossly improper".

In June 1983, Burke announced a number of measures to improve Western Australia's finances. Gas and electricity prices were increased on average by 15%, water increased by 7.9%, housing commission rents rose 10%, bus fares increased by 5%, rail and road coach fares rose 10% and hospital bed charges rose between 11.5% and 19%. These cost increases were expected to gain the government $60 million for the upcoming budget. He also announced pay cuts for senior public servants, politicians, and the judiciary, and that 1,000 government jobs would be removed, saving $15 million. The tribunals that usually set salaries were bypassed as these changes were done via an Act of Parliament. Although the public service union described this as "lunacy", the general public approved of the pay cuts, which overshadowed the cost increases. A Morgan Gallup poll taken as Burke announced the charge increases and salary cuts showed Burke to be Australia's most popular premier at the time, with an approval rating of 72%.

He appointed Gordon Reid as governor in 1984, refusing an offer from Trowbridge, who was English, to extend his term.

He started a three-year anti smoking campaign which cost $6 million as well as proposing to raise $32 million a year from a tobacco licence fee. He also considered a ban on the advertising of tobacco products.

As Minister for Women's Interests, Burke announced in August 1983 that he would set up a Women's Advisory Council and introduce anti-sex discrimination legislation to Parliament. The following month, the advisory council was set up, with 20 appointees there advising Cabinet on all policy decisions affecting women.

In September 1983, the Royal Perth Yacht Club won the 1983 America's Cup in the first successful challenge of the New York Yacht Club's 132-year defence of the Cup. He predicted that the 1987 defence of the Cup would necessitate a $500 million investment in Western Australia and an additional 400,000 to 500,000 tourists.

In December 1983, Burke reshuffled his ministry, making Berinson the minister for budget management, taking some workload off Burke's role as treasurer. By the end of 1983, Burke had established the Small Business Development Corporation, the Western Australian Institute of Sport, the Tripartite Labour Consultative Council to recommend legislation and reform for industrial relations, and the Multi-Cultural and Ethnic Affairs Commission.

In February 1984, Bill Hassell became the leader of the opposition, succeeding O'Connor.

In 1987, Cabinet gave approval for the electrification of the Fremantle, Armadale and Midland lines.

=== Daylight saving ===
The Burke Government passed legislation for a one-year trial of daylight saving over the summer of 1983–4. Following this, the 1984 daylight saving referendum occurred on 7 April 1984, at which the majority voted against making daylight saving permanent.

=== Capital punishment ===
As Premier, Burke pushed for the abolition of capital punishment. Western Australia was the second last state in which capital punishment was legal, with the last person executed being Eric Edgar Cooke in 1964. Since then, the death penalty had been commuted 23 times. On 13 June 1983, cabinet approved legislation to abolish capital punishment, and in 1984, Parliament passed the legislation. Burke later called this his "proudest achievement".

=== Aboriginal land rights ===
It was proposed at Labor's 1984 national conference that Aboriginal land rights be made uniform nationally. This included the right for Aboriginal people to "refuse permission for mining on their land or to impose conditions under which mining may proceed". Burke appointed Paul Seaman QC to conduct an inquiry into the issue. Seaman's report, released in September 1984, backed the concept of refusing permission for mining as well as proposing that an Aboriginal Lands Tribunal have the power to rule on land and compensation claims. Burke opposed these proposals, saying that the government should rule on land and compensation claims. Burke and Prime Minister Hawke eventually came to an agreement in October 1985 such that the federal government's legislation would not allow Aboriginal people to veto mining proposals on their lands. The state government introduced its own legislation on Aboriginal land rights in March 1985, but although Burke lobbied Opposition Leader Hassell to support the legislation, it was defeated in the Legislative Council. Burke told Hassell that if the opposition does not support the legislation, then the federal government would introduce stronger legislation. In August 1985, Federal Cabinet approved stronger legislation. Burke threatened to take the proposed legislation to the High Court, but after the 1986 state election in February that year, the federal government abandoned any plans for uniform national legislation, and accepted Western Australia's proposal for 99-year leases for existing Aboriginal reserves.

=== Burswood Casino ===
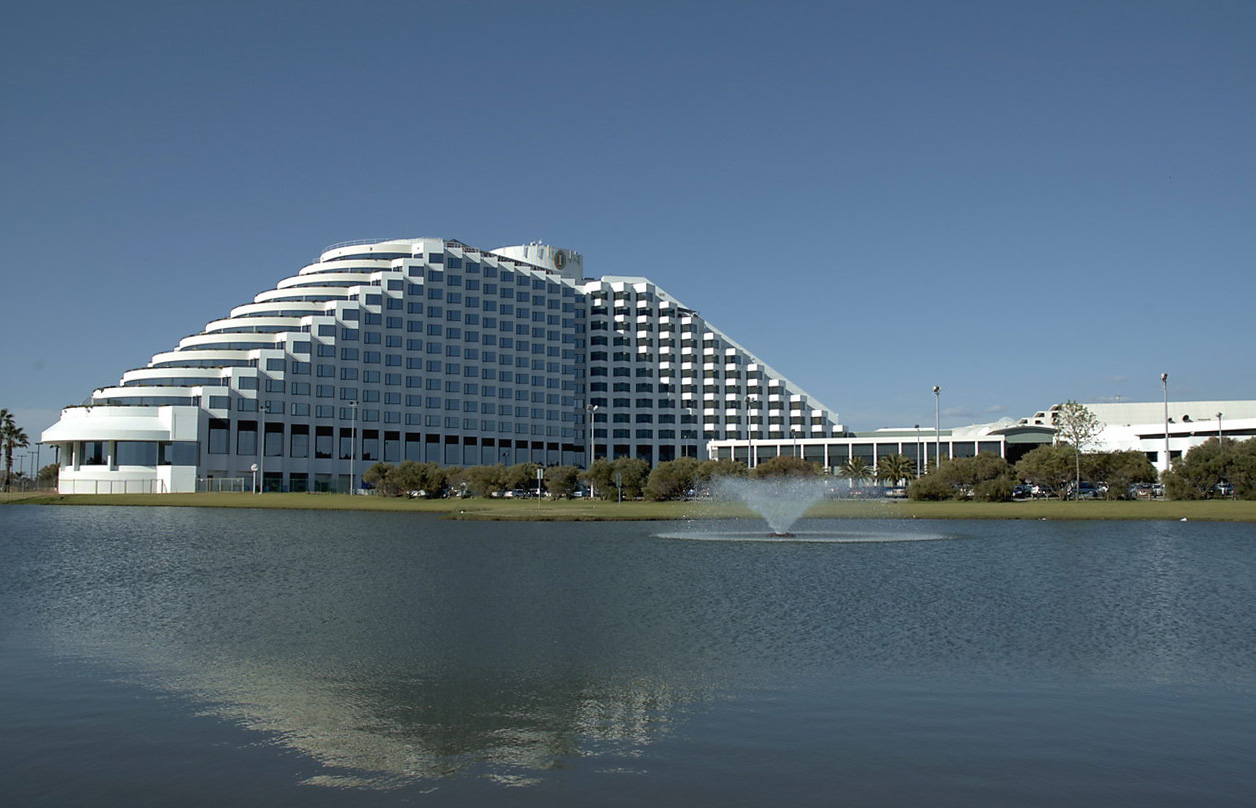
Burswood Casino in 2005

In 1984, Burke told Dallas Dempster that the government would call for expressions of interest for a casino to be built in Perth. Dempster then worked with Malaysian casino operator Genting to put together an application to build a casino on an old landfill in Burswood. The government chose the Burswood site as a result of Dempster, and competitors had to prepare bids for that site. The Dempster and Genting bid won out, sparking accusations of favouritism from rival bidders.

=== 1986 state election ===
Labor won the 1986 state election with 53% of the primary vote. The government lost three ministers: Ken McIver, who lost his seat, and Ron Davies and Dave Evans, who both retired. Burke chose to expand his ministry by two, leading to five new ministers. They were Ernie Bridge, who was Australia's first Aboriginal minister, Pam Beggs and Kay Hallahan, who were the WA Labor Party's first female ministers, and Ian Taylor and Gavan Troy.

=== Electoral reform ===
By the end of 1983, the Burke Government was yet to get the electoral reform legislation through the Legislative Council. It had spent $50,000 on an advertising campaign in an attempt to get public support for a referendum on the issue.

Burke's government enacted important electoral reforms in 1987, introducing multi-member electorates in the Legislative Council and a method of proportional representation 'weighted' to give extra representation to rural constituents (but ending excessive and unfair rural weighting which had been in effect for many years). Four-year maximum terms were established for the Legislative Assembly, and fixed four-year terms for the Legislative Council.

=== Rothwells ===
Rothwells was a merchant bank managed by Connell. He was the chairman and chief executive officer, and owned over a thirty percent stake in the company. Many of the bank's deposits were by community organisations, local councils, charities, and churches in Western Australia. In October 1987, the stock market crashed. Depositors worried about their deposit's safety began withdrawing funds. By 24 October, twenty-seven percent of Rothwell's funds had been withdrawn. Much of the run came from stockbroking firms retrieving funds they had deposited for clients. Unlike many other merchant banks, Rothwells did not have a major financial institution as its parent. It had to draw on lines of credit it had with other banks.

Rothwells would need $300 million in cash if all deposits were withdrawn. Over the weekend of 24 and 25 October, a rescue package was put together to save Rothwells from bankruptcy. A group of businessmen and companies, including Kerry Packer, Alan Bond, Robert Holmes à Court, Ron Brierley, and Dallas Dempster, committed $164 million in equity under the proviso that the Western Australian Government provide a guarantee for $150 million. $70 million of that was provided by Connell alone. Burke agreed to provide the guarantee under the conditions that equity was provided by the aforementioned businessmen and companies, that the government's guarantee rank last to reduce the chance that it be drawn from, that Holmes à Court commit equity, that Connell commit all his wealth, that the government get a director on Rothwells' board, that a high fee be charged for the facility provided, and that the Liberal Party support the proposal. The government expected to have to pay out no money to Rothwells. Opposition Leader Barry MacKinnon said that the Liberal Party would not support the proposal but not oppose it either. The proposal went ahead anyway, with Burke announcing it to the public on 25 October. A year later, Rothwells went into liquidation. It later emerged that the two largest debtors were companies owned by Laurie Connell.

== Resignation ==
Upon becoming premier, Burke promised to resign after five years. Upon his 1986 election victory, he told his ministry "I'll be leaving in two years", although most could not tell if he was serious. In public, he would say that he intended to lead Labor through the next election, but leading up to the end of 1987, speculation that he would resign increased.

In December 1987, Burke announced his intention to resign as premier and from Parliament on 25 February 1988. Dowding was the most likely candidate to replace him, with Burke picking Dowding as his preferred successor. A secret opinion poll conducted by the Labor Party in March 1987 found that Dowding was the most "electorally acceptable" candidate, however certain trade unions and sections of the Labor Party disliked Dowding. Other contenders were David Parker, Bob Pearce, and Julian Grill, however they all pulled out of contention before the 30 December Labor caucus vote due to Burke's influence, the opinion poll, and the need for the party to be united. Dowding was unanimously elected as the leader of the Labor Party, and Parker was unanimously elected as deputy leader, replacing Mal Bryce, who had also announced his intention to resign.

Burke then accepted an appointment as Australia's ambassador to Ireland and the Holy See. In the 1988 Queen's Birthday Honours, he was appointed a Companion to the Order of Australia.

== Downfall ==
In April 1991, Burke appeared before the WA Inc royal commission. The royal commission's report, released on 19 October 1992, was critical of Burke but did not consider his behaviour illegal. The report stated:

Some ministers elevated personal or party advantage over their constitutional obligation to act in the public interest. The decision to lend Government support to the rescue of Rothwells in October 1987 was principally that of Mr Burke as Premier. Mr Burke's motives in supporting the rescue were not related solely to proper governmental concerns. They derived in part from his well-established relationship with Mr Connell, the chairman and major shareholder of Rothwells, and from his desire to preserve the standing of the Australian Labor Party in the eyes of those sections of the business community from which it had secured much financial support.

However, another report found that he had falsely claimed $17,000 worth of travel expenses. In 1992, Burke was charged with five counts of defrauding the state by making false claims on the parliamentary imprest account. He was accused of claiming money from the account on five occasions despite those trips having been already paid for by another account. Burke's defence was that his staff had done so unwittingly and that he had no knowledge of it. One of the charges was later dropped. On 13 July 1994, Burke was found guilty on all four counts of fraud. The maximum sentence he faced was three years jail for each count. He was released on bail for $25,000. Two days later, he was sentenced to two years in prison. He was released on parole after seven months.

In April 1995, he was stripped of his Order of Australia honour.

In March 1997, he was found guilty of stealing $122,585 in campaign donations to the Labor Party to fund his stamp collection. He was sentenced to three years jail, but served six months before the conviction was quashed on appeal.

== Lobbying activities ==
Burke became active as a consultant and lobbyist for Western Australian business interests. His continued involvement in state Labor branch politics was the subject of controversy since before Labor returned to power in 2001. As premier, Geoff Gallop banned cabinet ministers from contact with Burke, but this was lifted by his successor Alan Carpenter when he took office in January 2006.

In November 2006, Burke's friend Norm Marlborough resigned from cabinet after it was revealed at a Crime and Corruption Commission (CCC) hearing that he used a secret phone to communicate with Burke. Burke and his lobbying partner Julian Grill had been under investigation and had their phones tapped by the CCC for lobbying for the Smiths Beach development in Yallingup. In one instance, Burke tried to direct Marlborough to appoint a woman to a government commission. Two days later, Burke left the Labor Party, after Carpenter issued an ultimatum that he would quit if Burke did not leave the party. In February 2007, McRae was removed from cabinet after he was questioned by the CCC. McRae had discussed political fundraising with Grill and was accused of reversing a planning decision for Burke and Grill when he was the assistant minister for planning. Carpenter said that "Mr McRae has committed a major error of judgement in discussing political fundraising assistance with a person commercially involved with a project that was before the minister for consideration. A day later, Bowler was removed from cabinet and resigned from the Labor Party after it was alleged at a CCC hearing that he was revealing government secrets to Burke and Grill.

On 1 April 2010, Burke was found guilty of knowingly giving false testimony to the CCC and fined $25,000. In October 2010, an appeal against his conviction was dismissed, his conviction was upheld in March 2012 upon an appeal to the Supreme Court of Western Australia, and in November 2012, a bid to have an appeal heard by the High Court of Australia was dismissed.

In December 2012, Burke was found not guilty of illegally obtaining official secrets.

In October 2012, Burke and David Massey were charged with four counts of insider trading relating to the telecommunications company Amcom. The charges arose from the taping of Burke's phone calls. The charges were dropped in February 2014.

Since retiring as a lobbyist in 2006, Burke has worked with his son Peter as a property developer.

== Personal life ==
Burke and his wife have four sons and two daughters.

In 1984, Burke stated "I leave the church going to my wife. I run the country." In 1986, when asked "Are you a practising Catholic?", he replied "no, I am not a practising Catholic... I suppose I am partly a practising Catholic."

== Legacy ==
Burke has had several books written about him. Patrick O'Brien, the senior lecturer in politics at the University of Western Australia, released The Burke Ambush: Corporatism and Society in Western Australia in 1986 and Burke's Shambles: Parliamentary Contempt in the Wild West alongside Anthony McAdam in 1987. In 1988, John Hamilton released Burkie: A Biography of Brian Burke with the cooperation of Burke. In 2008, Edith Cowan University professor Quentin Beresford released The Godfather: The Life of Brian Burke, an unauthorised biography. In 2017, Burke released an autobiography titled A Tumultuous Life. There is also Brian Peachy's The Burkes of Western Australia, which was released in 1992 and is about Burke's father and his family. In 2008, Business News's Joseph Poprzeczny said that Burke was the most written about premier in Western Australian history.

== See also ==
- Electoral results for the district of Balcatta
- Electoral results for the district of Balga
- List of heads of government who were later imprisoned
- List of Australian politicians convicted of crimes
- Political families of Australia

Parliament of Western Australia
Preceded by Herb Graham; New title	Member for Balcatta; 30 March 1973 – 30 March 1974; 19 February 1977 – 25 February 1983	Succeeded by Abolished; Ron Bertram
Preceded by New title New title	Member for Balga; 30 March 1974 – 19 February 1977; 19 February 1983 – 25 February 1988	Succeeded by Abolished; Ted Cunningham
Political offices
Preceded by Ron Davies	Leader of the Opposition; 18 September 1981 – 19 February 1983	Succeeded by Ray O'Connor
Preceded by Ray O'Connor	Premier of Western Australia; 25 February 1983 – 25 February 1988	Succeeded by Peter Dowding
Preceded by Ray O'Connor	Treasurer of Western Australia; 25 February 1983 – 25 February 1988	Succeeded by Peter Dowding
Party political offices
Preceded by Ron Davies	Leader of the Western Australian Labor Party; 18 September 1981 – 25 February 1988	Succeeded by Peter Dowding
Diplomatic posts
Preceded by Frank Milne	Australian Ambassador to Ireland and Australian Ambassador to the Holy See; 5 June 1988 – 31 July 1991	Succeeded by Terence McCarthy
