= Electoral district of Balcatta =

State electoral district of Western Australia

Balcatta Western Australia—Legislative Assembly
- Interactive map of electoral district boundaries from the 2025 state election
- State: Western Australia
- Dates current: 1904–1911; 1962–1974; 1977–1996; 2005–present
- MP: David Michael
- Party: Labor
- Namesake: Balcatta
- Electors: 30,541 (2025)
- Area: 20 km^{2} (7.7 sq mi)
- Demographic: Metropolitan
- Coordinates: 31.88°S 115.81°E
Electorates around Balcatta:
Carine	Kingsley	Girrawheen
Scarborough	Balcatta	Morley
Churchlands	Perth	Mount Lawley

Balcatta is an electoral district of the Legislative Assembly in the Australian state of Western Australia.

The district is based in Perth's northern suburbs. Historically a safe seat for the Labor Party, it was held by the Liberal Party for one term between 2013 and 2017.

== Geography ==
Balcatta is located in Perth's northern suburbs. It is a north–south elongated electorate, situated between the Mitchell Freeway to the west and Wanneroo Road to the east. The district includes the suburbs of Balcatta, Stirling, Tuart Hill, Joondanna, and Westminster, as well as the parts of Osborne Park located east of the Mitchell Freeway.

== History ==
Balcatta has had several incarnations as an electoral district. It has been held by the Labor Party on every occasion, except for a single term from 1905 to 1908 and again from 2013 to 2017.

The first incarnation of the seat, established by the Redistribution of Seats Act 1904, was spelled "Balkatta" in some sources and "Balcatta" in others. It extended from modern-day Sorrento to Herdsman Lake, and was won by Labor's Frederick Gill at its first election in August 1904. However, the minority government of which he was a part—referred to in the press as a "Mark-Time Ministry"—collapsed a year later, and Gill, along with several other Labor members, lost their seats at the 1905 election to Ministerialist candidates. John Veryard held the seat for a single term, losing it to Gill in 1908. The seat was then abolished by the Redistribution of Seats Act 1911, with most of its area incorporated into the new seat of Leederville, which Gill subsequently won.

A new district of Balcatta was created ahead of the 1962 state election and was won by Labor's Herb Graham, who had been the member for East Perth for the previous 19 years, prior to its abolition in the redistribution. Graham represented Balcatta for over a decade before retiring from politics on 30 May 1973 to accept a position on the Licensing Court. At the resulting by-election held on 28 July 1973—which was closely watched as an indication of Premier Tonkin's Labor government's standing and because it would determine whether Labor retained its one-seat majority in Parliament—former television news reporter and Labor candidate Brian Burke won by 30 votes on preferences, having trailed Liberal candidate Neil Beck on the primary vote. The seat was renamed Balga effective from the 1974 state election.

The name Balcatta was revived for the district one term later at the 1977 state election, following a redistribution in 1976. Burke once again won the seat, and subsequently became Labor Party leader and State Opposition Leader on 28 September 1981.

At the 1982 redistribution, which took effect at the 1983 state election, Balcatta was significantly altered. Previously including the suburbs of Balcatta, Balga, Girrawheen, Nollamara, Westminster and parts of Osborne Park, it was redrawn west of Wanneroo Road and southwards into Tuart Hill and Joondanna. A new district of Balga was created to cover the northern suburbs. Burke transferred to the new Balga seat, while Labor's Ron Bertram, the former member for the abolished seat of Mount Hawthorn, transferred into Balcatta.

The district was again abolished ahead of the 1996 state election. The sitting Labor MP, Nick Catania, unsuccessfully contested the new seat of Yokine.

Balcatta returned as an electorate name at the 2005 state election. The seat was won by Labor MP John Kobelke, who had previously been the member for Nollamara.

== Members for Balcatta ==
Balcatta (1904–1911)
Member	Party	Term
Frederick Gill	Labor	1904–1905
John Veryard	Ministerial	1905–1908
Frederick Gill	Labor	1908–1911
Balcatta (1962–1974)
Member	Party	Term
Herb Graham	Labor	1962–1973
Brian Burke	Labor	1973–1974
Balcatta (1977–1996)
Member	Party	Term
Brian Burke	Labor	1977–1983
Ron Bertram	Labor	1983–1989
Nick Catania	Labor	1989–1996
Balcatta (2005–present)
Member	Party	Term
John Kobelke	Labor	2005–2013
Chris Hatton	Liberal	2013–2017
David Michael	Labor	2017–present

== Election results ==
2025 Western Australian state election: Balcatta
Party	Candidate	Votes	%	±%
Labor	David Michael	12,404	49.4	−17.1
Liberal	James Helliwell	6,500	25.9	+7.1
Greens	Trevor Don	3,120	12.4	+4.8
One Nation	David Potter	1,055	4.2	+4.2
Legalise Cannabis	Chris Cole	896	3.6	+3.6
Christians	Wesley D'Costa	632	2.5	+0.4
Shooters, Fishers, Farmers	Robert Hollier	514	2.0	+2.0
Total formal votes		25,121	95.0	−0.1
Informal votes		1,318	5.0	+0.1
Turnout		26,439	86.6	+3.2
Two-party-preferred result
Labor	David Michael	16,192	64.5	−11.2
Liberal	James Helliwell	8,908	35.5	+11.2
Labor hold		Swing	−11.2	
