= Results of the 1977 Western Australian state election (Legislative Assembly) =

Western Australian state election, 19 February 1977 Legislative Assembly << 1974–1980 >>
Enrolled voters	663,113				
Votes cast	601,975		Turnout	90.78%	+0.65%
Informal votes	19,148		Informal	3.18%	–0.90%
Summary of votes by party
Party	Primary votes	%	Swing	Seats	Change
Liberal	287,651	49.35%	+9.02%	27	+ 4
Labor	257,730	44.22%	–3.88%	22	± 0
National Country	30,784	5.28%	–5.52%	6	± 0
Progress	2,640	0.45%	+0.45%	0	± 0
Australia Party	549	0.09%	–0.31%	0	± 0
Independent	3,473	0.60%	+0.23%	0	± 0
Total	582,827			55	
Two-party-preferred
Liberal/NCP	318,796	54.70%	+4.53%		
Labor	264,031	45.30%	–4.53%		

This is a list of electoral district results of the 1977 Western Australian election.

== Results by electoral district ==
=== Albany ===
1977 Western Australian state election: Albany
Party	Candidate	Votes	%	±%
Liberal	Leo Watt	4,592	62.9	
Labor	Ray Wood	2,704	37.1	
Total formal votes		7,296	97.5	
Informal votes		185	2.5	
Turnout		7,481	93.2	
Liberal hold		Swing	+9.9	

=== Ascot ===
1977 Western Australian state election: Ascot
Party	Candidate	Votes	%	±%
Labor	Mal Bryce	7,931	59.0	
Liberal	John Bamford	5,518	41.0	
Total formal votes		13,449	95.8	
Informal votes		589	4.2	
Turnout		14,038	90.8	
Labor hold		Swing	−7.4	

=== Avon ===
1977 Western Australian state election: Avon
Party	Candidate	Votes	%	±%
Labor	Ken McIver	3,787	53.8	
Liberal	Kelvin Bulloch	3,257	46.2	
Total formal votes		7,044	97.7	
Informal votes		168	2.3	
Turnout		7,212	93.8	
Labor hold		Swing	−0.9	

=== Balcatta ===
1977 Western Australian state election: Balcatta
Party	Candidate	Votes	%	±%
Labor	Brian Burke	9,182	61.3	
Liberal	Geoffrey Hasler	5,799	38.7	
Total formal votes		14,981	96.4	
Informal votes		555	3.6	
Turnout		15,536	90.0	
Labor hold		Swing	+2.3	

=== Bunbury ===
1977 Western Australian state election: Bunbury
Party	Candidate	Votes	%	±%
Liberal	John Sibson	4,357	54.5	
Labor	David Smith	3,643	45.5	
Total formal votes		8,000	98.4	
Informal votes		131	1.6	
Turnout		8,131	92.7	
Liberal hold		Swing	+4.1	

=== Canning ===
1977 Western Australian state election: Canning
Party	Candidate	Votes	%	±%
Labor	Tom Bateman	7,686	53.1	
Liberal	Richard Shellabear	6,800	46.9	
Total formal votes		14,486	96.5	
Informal votes		524	3.5	
Turnout		15,010	90.2	
Labor hold		Swing	−4.5	

=== Clontarf ===
1977 Western Australian state election: Clontarf
Party	Candidate	Votes	%	±%
Liberal	Tony Williams	8,296	57.6	
Labor	Colin Puls	6,111	42.4	
Total formal votes		14,407	96.7	
Informal votes		490	3.3	
Turnout		14,897	92.4	
Liberal gain from Labor		Swing	+9.8	

=== Cockburn ===
1977 Western Australian state election: Cockburn
Party	Candidate	Votes	%	±%
Labor	Don Taylor	9,171	67.5	
Liberal	George Grljusich	4,407	32.5	
Total formal votes		13,578	96.5	
Informal votes		486	3.5	
Turnout		14,064	90.9	
Labor hold		Swing	−2.2	

=== Collie ===
1977 Western Australian state election: Collie
Party	Candidate	Votes	%	±%
Labor	Tom Jones	4,609	61.1	
Liberal	Maurice Williams	2,937	38.9	
Total formal votes		7,546	97.7	
Informal votes		175	2.3	
Turnout		7,721	94.4	
Labor hold		Swing	0.0	

=== Cottesloe ===
1977 Western Australian state election: Cottesloe
Party	Candidate	Votes	%	±%
Liberal	Bill Hassell	8,147	59.7	
Labor	Howard Olney	5,489	40.3	
Total formal votes		13,636	97.7	
Informal votes		324	2.3	
Turnout		13,960	89.5	
Liberal hold		Swing	+1.8	

=== Dale ===
1977 Western Australian state election: Dale
Party	Candidate	Votes	%	±%
Liberal	Cyril Rushton	3,751	57.2	
Labor	Michael Marsh	2,804	42.8	
Total formal votes		6,555	96.9	
Informal votes		210	3.1	
Turnout		6,765	90.9	
Liberal hold		Swing	+2.4	

=== Darling Range ===
1977 Western Australian state election: Darling Range
Party	Candidate	Votes	%	±%
Liberal	George Spriggs	4,092	64.0	
Labor	William O'Brien	2,298	36.0	
Total formal votes		6,390	95.6	
Informal votes		291	4.4	
Turnout		6,681	90.2	
Liberal hold		Swing	−1.5	

=== Dianella ===
1977 Western Australian state election: Dianella
Party	Candidate	Votes	%	±%
Labor	Keith Wilson	8,003	54.3	
Liberal	Peter Foeken	6,735	45.7	
Total formal votes		14,738	96.6	
Informal votes		512	3.4	
Turnout		15,250	91.6	
Labor hold		Swing	−3.7	

=== East Melville ===
1977 Western Australian state election: East Melville
Party	Candidate	Votes	%	±%
Liberal	Des O'Neil	9,720	65.5	
Labor	Lionel Christensen	5,119	34.5	
Total formal votes		14,839	97.6	
Informal votes		359	2.4	
Turnout		15,198	91.8	
Liberal hold		Swing	+6.1	

=== Floreat ===
1977 Western Australian state election: Floreat
Party	Candidate	Votes	%	±%
Liberal	Andrew Mensaros	10,101	71.2	
Labor	Hilary Snell	3,404	24.0	
Independent	Frank Parry	675	4.8	
Total formal votes		14,180	98.4	
Informal votes		228	1.6	
Turnout		14,408	92.7	
Two-party-preferred result
Liberal	Andrew Mensaros	10,439	73.6	+9.8
Labor	Hilary Snell	3,741	26.4	−9.8
Liberal hold		Swing	+9.8	

=== Fremantle ===
1977 Western Australian state election: Fremantle
Party	Candidate	Votes	%	±%
Labor	John Troy	9,222	64.3	
Liberal	Ernestine Rosenstein	5,124	35.7	
Total formal votes		14,346	94.3	
Informal votes		868	5.7	
Turnout		15,214	90.5	
Labor hold		Swing	−2.2	

=== Gascoyne ===
1977 Western Australian state election: Gascoyne
Party	Candidate	Votes	%	±%
Liberal	Ian Laurance	2,192	69.5	
Labor	Robert Brown	834	26.5	
Independent	Robert Phillips	127	4.0	
Total formal votes		3,153	97.1	
Informal votes		95	2.9	
Turnout		3,248	89.4	
Two-party-preferred result
Liberal	Ian Laurance	2,256	71.6	+6.2
Labor	Robert Brown	897	28.4	−6.2
Liberal hold		Swing	+6.2	

=== Geraldton ===
1977 Western Australian state election: Geraldton
Party	Candidate	Votes	%	±%
Labor	Jeff Carr	4,157	54.3	
Liberal	John Grosse	3,104	40.6	
Progress	Fiona Ensor	392	5.1	
Total formal votes		7,653	98.0	
Informal votes		157	2.0	
Turnout		7,810	91.2	
Two-party-preferred result
Labor	Jeff Carr	4,255	55.6	−0.2
Liberal	John Grosse	3,398	44.4	+0.2
Labor hold		Swing	−0.2	

=== Gosnells ===
1977 Western Australian state election: Gosnells
Party	Candidate	Votes	%	±%
Labor	Bob Pearce	6,840	48.9	
Liberal	Brian Piesse	6,712	47.9	
Independent	Gordon Stapp	450	3.2	
Total formal votes		14,002	96.0	
Informal votes		585	4.0	
Turnout		14,587	91.5	
Two-party-preferred result
Labor	Bob Pearce	7,120	50.9	−4.2
Liberal	Brian Piesse	6,882	49.1	+4.2
Labor hold		Swing	−4.2	

=== Greenough ===
1977 Western Australian state election: Greenough
Party	Candidate	Votes	%	±%
Liberal	Reg Tubby	4,965	64.6	
Labor	Kenneth Davis	1,432	18.6	
Progress	Geoffrey McNeil	1,293	16.8	
Total formal votes		7,690	97.6	
Informal votes		190	2.4	
Turnout		7,880	92.6	
Two-party-preferred result
Liberal	Reg Tubby	5,935	77.2	−0.6
Labor	Kenneth Davis	1,755	22.8	+0.6
Liberal hold		Swing	−0.6	

=== Kalamunda ===
1977 Western Australian state election: Kalamunda
Party	Candidate	Votes	%	±%
Liberal	Ian Thompson	5,397	68.6	
Labor	Shane Baker	2,468	31.4	
Total formal votes		7,865	97.6	
Informal votes		190	2.4	
Turnout		8,055	90.5	
Liberal hold		Swing	+9.3	

=== Kalgoorlie ===
1977 Western Australian state election: Kalgoorlie
Party	Candidate	Votes	%	±%
Labor	Tom Evans	4,184	62.0	
Liberal	Stuart Dunkley	2,132	31.6	
Progress	Graham Mills	434	6.4	
Total formal votes		6,750	96.2	
Informal votes		269	3.8	
Turnout		7,019	89.1	
Two-party-preferred result
Labor	Tom Evans	4,292	63.6	−0.2
Liberal	Stuart Dunkley	2,458	36.4	+0.2
Labor hold		Swing	−0.2	

=== Karrinyup ===
1977 Western Australian state election: Karrinyup
Party	Candidate	Votes	%	±%
Liberal	Jim Clarko	8,963	61.0	
Labor	Peter Rose	5,738	39.0	
Total formal votes		14,701	97.5	
Informal votes		369	2.5	
Turnout		15,070	91.6	
Liberal hold		Swing	+7.5	

=== Katanning ===
1977 Western Australian state election: Katanning
Party	Candidate	Votes	%	±%
National Country	Dick Old	5,122	72.9	
Labor	Christopher Bothams	976	13.9	
Liberal	Peter Hatherly	931	13.2	
Total formal votes		7,029	97.8	
Informal votes		155	2.2	
Turnout		7,184	94.4	
Two-party-preferred result
National Country	Dick Old	5,960	84.8	+6.2
Labor	Christopher Bothams	1,069	15.2	−6.2
National Country hold		Swing	+6.2	

=== Kimberley ===
1977 Western Australian state election: Kimberley
Party	Candidate	Votes	%	±%
Liberal	Alan Ridge	1,726	49.7	
Labor	Ernie Bridge	1,631	46.9	
Independent	Allan Rees	118	3.4	
Total formal votes		3,475	91.8	
Informal votes		311	8.2	
Turnout		3,786	81.1	
Two-party-preferred result
Liberal	Alan Ridge	1,784	51.3	−7.1
Labor	Ernie Bridge	1,691	48.7	+7.1
Liberal hold		Swing	−7.1	

=== Maylands ===
1977 Western Australian state election: Maylands
Party	Candidate	Votes	%	±%
Labor	John Harman	8,150	54.6	
Liberal	Brian Dillon	6,777	45.4	
Total formal votes		14,927	96.3	
Informal votes		569	3.7	
Turnout		15,496	90.2	
Labor hold		Swing	−6.6	

=== Melville ===
1977 Western Australian state election: Melville
Party	Candidate	Votes	%	±%
Labor	Barry Hodge	8,686	59.8	
Liberal	Daryl Williams	5,831	40.2	
Total formal votes		14,517	96.7	
Informal votes		495	3.3	
Turnout		15,012	92.2	
Labor hold		Swing	−9.8	

=== Merredin ===
1977 Western Australian state election: Merredin
Party	Candidate	Votes	%	±%
National Country	Hendy Cowan	4,103	56.9	
Labor	George Banks	1,699	23.6	
Liberal	Garry Hawkes	1,408	19.5	
Total formal votes		7,210	97.7	
Informal votes		173	2.3	
Turnout		7,383	92.5	
Two-party-preferred result
National Country	Hendy Cowan	5,370	74.5	+9.5
Labor	George Banks	1,840	25.5	−9.5
National Country hold		Swing	+9.5	

=== Moore ===
1977 Western Australian state election: Moore
Party	Candidate	Votes	%	±%
National Country	Bert Crane	3,395	44.5	
Liberal	Irwin Barrett-Lennard	2,625	34.4	
Labor	Ewold Jager	1,607	21.1	
Total formal votes		7,627	96.6	
Informal votes		272	3.4	
Turnout		7,899	91.9	
Two-candidate-preferred result
National Country	Bert Crane	4,827	63.3	
Liberal	Irwin Barrett-Lennard	2,800	36.7	
National Country hold		Swing	N/A	

=== Morley ===
1977 Western Australian state election: Morley
Party	Candidate	Votes	%	±%
Labor	Arthur Tonkin	8,346	58.3	
Liberal	Madge Bicknell	5,980	41.7	
Total formal votes		14,326	96.4	
Informal votes		528	3.6	
Turnout		14,854	91.0	
Labor hold		Swing	−5.0	

=== Mount Hawthorn ===
1977 Western Australian state election: Mount Hawthorn
Party	Candidate	Votes	%	±%
Labor	Ronald Bertram	8,249	57.5	
Liberal	Brian Morris	6,105	42.5	
Total formal votes		14,354	95.7	
Informal votes		638	4.3	
Turnout		14,992	89.7	
Labor hold		Swing	+0.8	

=== Mount Lawley ===
1977 Western Australian state election: Mount Lawley
Party	Candidate	Votes	%	±%
Liberal	Ray O'Connor	8,196	56.6	
Labor	Athol Monck	5,459	37.7	
Independent	Malcolm Hall	824	5.7	
Total formal votes		14,479	96.6	
Informal votes		502	3.4	
Turnout		14,981	90.1	
Two-party-preferred result
Liberal	Ray O'Connor	8,608	59.5	+0.9
Labor	Athol Monck	5,871	40.5	−0.9
Liberal hold		Swing	+0.9	

=== Mount Marshall ===
1977 Western Australian state election: Mount Marshall
Party	Candidate	Votes	%	±%
National Country	Ray McPharlin	4,937	69.8	
Liberal	Harold Lundy	2,140	30.2	
Total formal votes		7,077	96.4	
Informal votes		265	3.6	
Turnout		7,342	91.6	
National Country hold		Swing	N/A	

=== Mundaring ===
1977 Western Australian state election: Mundaring
Party	Candidate	Votes	%	±%
Liberal	Tom Herzfeld	3,409	49.2	
Labor	James Moiler	3,250	46.9	
Progress	Bryan Scott-Courtland	274	3.9	
Total formal votes		6,933	96.4	
Informal votes		257	3.6	
Turnout		7,190	89.7	
Two-party-preferred result
Liberal	Tom Herzfeld	3,617	52.2	+3.8
Labor	James Moiler	3,316	47.8	−3.8
Liberal gain from Labor		Swing	+3.8	

=== Murchison-Eyre ===
1977 Western Australian state election: Murchison-Eyre
Party	Candidate	Votes	%	±%
Liberal	Peter Coyne	1,069	63.8	
Labor	Patricia Logue	607	36.2	
Total formal votes		1,676	97.5	
Informal votes		43	2.5	
Turnout		1,719	81.5	
Liberal hold		Swing	+6.3	

=== Murdoch ===
1977 Western Australian state election: Murdoch
Party	Candidate	Votes	%	±%
Liberal	Barry MacKinnon	8,572	52.4	
Labor	Garry Kelly	7,777	47.6	
Total formal votes		16,349	97.1	
Informal votes		496	2.9	
Turnout		16,845	92.5	
Liberal gain from Labor		Swing	+11.0	

=== Murray ===
1977 Western Australian state election: Murray
Party	Candidate	Votes	%	±%
Liberal	Richard Shalders	4,805	60.3	
Labor	Noel Truman	3,157	39.7	
Total formal votes		7,962	97.4	
Informal votes		7,962	2.6	
Turnout		8,170	93.7	
Liberal gain from Labor		Swing	+11.3	

=== Narrogin ===
1977 Western Australian state election: Narrogin
Party	Candidate	Votes	%	±%
National Country	Peter Jones	5,510	78.8	
Liberal	Francesco Buemi	1,479	21.2	
Total formal votes		6,989	95.4	
Informal votes		337	4.6	
Turnout		7,326	93.6	
National Country hold		Swing	N/A	

=== Nedlands ===
1977 Western Australian state election: Nedlands
Party	Candidate	Votes	%	±%
Liberal	Charles Court	9,434	71.0	
Labor	Gordon Black	3,044	22.9	
Australia	John Hallam	549	4.1	
Independent	Graeme Pratt	135	1.0	
Independent	James Croasdale	129	1.0	
Total formal votes		13,291	97.9	
Informal votes		284	2.1	
Turnout		13,575	90.0	
Two-party-preferred result
Liberal	Charles Court	9,841	74.0	+6.5
Labor	Gordon Black	3,450	26.0	−6.5
Liberal hold		Swing	+6.5	

=== Perth ===
1977 Western Australian state election: Perth
Party	Candidate	Votes	%	±%
Labor	Terry Burke	7,525	59.7	
Liberal	Hal Colebatch	5,083	40.3	
Total formal votes		12,608	96.2	
Informal votes		504	3.8	
Turnout		13,112	85.2	
Labor hold		Swing	−2.0	

=== Pilbara ===
1977 Western Australian state election: Pilbara
Party	Candidate	Votes	%	±%
Liberal	Brian Sodeman	6,027	52.8	
Labor	Norm Marlborough	5,393	47.2	
Total formal votes		11,420	96.3	
Informal votes		443	3.7	
Turnout		11,863	83.4	
Liberal hold		Swing	+1.5	

=== Rockingham ===
1977 Western Australian state election: Rockingham
Party	Candidate	Votes	%	±%
Labor	Mike Barnett	4,843	54.0	
Liberal	Ernest England	4,125	46.0	
Total formal votes		8,968	98.3	
Informal votes		158	1.7	
Turnout		9,126	92.5	
Labor hold		Swing	+2.3	

=== Roe ===
1977 Western Australian state election: Roe
Party	Candidate	Votes	%	±%
Liberal	Geoff Grewar	3,792	50.4	
National Country	Owen Kirwan	2,542	33.8	
Labor	Dianne Jones	1,190	15.8	
Total formal votes		7,524	98.2	
Informal votes		135	1.8	
Turnout		7,659	92.0	
Two-party-preferred result
Liberal	Geoff Grewar	6,080	80.8	+6.8
Labor	Dianne Jones	1,444	19.2	−6.8
Liberal hold		Swing	+6.8	

- Preferences were not distributed between the Liberal and NCP candidates for Roe.

=== Scarborough ===
1977 Western Australian state election: Scarborough
Party	Candidate	Votes	%	±%
Liberal	Ray Young	7,828	56.6	
Labor	Desmond Moore	5,989	43.4	
Total formal votes		13,817	97.2	
Informal votes		396	2.8	
Turnout		14,213	90.7	
Liberal gain from Labor		Swing	+7.4	

=== South Perth ===
1977 Western Australian state election: South Perth
Party	Candidate	Votes	%	±%
Liberal	Bill Grayden	8,162	62.8	
Labor	Bill Johnson	4,832	37.2	
Total formal votes		12,994	97.4	
Informal votes		345	2.6	
Turnout		13,339	88.0	
Liberal hold		Swing	+4.0	

=== Stirling ===
1977 Western Australian state election: Stirling
Party	Candidate	Votes	%	±%
National Country	Matt Stephens	5,175	71.3	
Liberal	Douglas Campbell	2,079	28.7	
Total formal votes		7,254	96.5	
Informal votes		262	3.5	
Turnout		7,516	93.3	
National Country hold		Swing	N/A	

=== Subiaco ===
1977 Western Australian state election: Subiaco
Party	Candidate	Votes	%	±%
Liberal	Tom Dadour	8,690	64.1	
Labor	Wendy Fatin	4,868	35.9	
Total formal votes		13,558	97.7	
Informal votes		315	2.3	
Turnout		13,873	87.7	
Liberal hold		Swing	+7.6	

=== Swan ===
1977 Western Australian state election: Swan
Party	Candidate	Votes	%	±%
Labor	Jack Skidmore	7,831	56.0	
Liberal	Peter Unger	6,143	44.0	
Total formal votes		13,974	95.9	
Informal votes		604	4.1	
Turnout		14,578	90.6	
Labor hold		Swing	−6.4	

=== Vasse ===
1977 Western Australian state election: Vasse
Party	Candidate	Votes	%	±%
Liberal	Barry Blaikie	5,493	67.3	
Labor	Peter Naughton	1,961	24.0	
Independent	Alister Walker	707	8.7	
Total formal votes		8,161	97.9	
Informal votes		172	2.1	
Turnout		8,333	95.0	
Two-party-preferred result
Liberal	Barry Blaikie	5,847	71.6	+2.4
Labor	Peter Naughton	2,314	28.4	−2.4
Liberal hold		Swing	+2.4	

=== Victoria Park ===
1977 Western Australian state election: Victoria Park
Party	Candidate	Votes	%	±%
Labor	Ron Davies	8,203	59.6	
Liberal	Michael Smith	5,563	40.4	
Total formal votes		13,766	96.3	
Informal votes		531	3.7	
Turnout		14,297	89.7	
Labor hold		Swing	−5.1	

=== Warren ===
1977 Western Australian state election: Warren
Party	Candidate	Votes	%	±%
Labor	David Evans	4,306	53.9	
Liberal	Bill King	3,374	42.2	
Independent	Noel Duggen	308	3.9	
Total formal votes		7,988	98.3	
Informal votes		137	1.7	
Turnout		8,125	92.9	
Two-party-preferred result
Labor	Hywel Evans	4,460	55.8	+3.3
Liberal	Bill King	3,528	44.2	−3.3
Labor hold		Swing	+3.3	

=== Wellington ===
1977 Western Australian state election: Wellington
Party	Candidate	Votes	%	±%
Liberal	June Craig	4,630	61.3	
Labor	Robert Greeve	2,928	38.7	
Total formal votes		7,558	97.1	
Informal votes		224	2.9	
Turnout		7,782	92.7	
Liberal hold		Swing	+6.7	

=== Welshpool ===
1977 Western Australian state election: Welshpool
Party	Candidate	Votes	%	±%
Labor	Colin Jamieson	7,772	56.2	
Liberal	Brian Rose	6,065	43.8	
Total formal votes		13,837	95.7	
Informal votes		621	4.3	
Turnout		14,458	90.1	
Labor hold		Swing	−7.9	

=== Whitford ===
1977 Western Australian state election: Whitford
Party	Candidate	Votes	%	±%
Liberal	Mick Nanovich	10,660	62.4	
Labor	Marilyn Anthony	6,426	37.6	
Total formal votes		17,086	97.8	
Informal votes		389	2.2	
Turnout		17,475	92.8	
Liberal hold		Swing	+7.5	

=== Yilgarn-Dundas ===
1977 Western Australian state election: Yilgarn-Dundas
Party	Candidate	Votes	%	±%
Labor	Julian Grill	4,209	61.8	
Liberal	Douglas Daws	2,352	34.5	
Progress	Jillian van der Woude	247	3.6	
Total formal votes		6,808	94.1	
Informal votes		429	5.9	
Turnout		7,237	87.1	
Two-party-preferred result
Labor	Julian Grill	4,271	62.7	+1.2
Liberal	Douglas Daws	2,537	37.3	−1.2
Labor hold		Swing	+1.2	

== See also ==
- 1977 Western Australian state election
- Members of the Western Australian Legislative Assembly, 1977–1980
- Candidates of the 1977 Western Australian state election
