= Candidates of the 1977 Western Australian state election =

The 1977 Western Australian state election was held on 19 February 1977.

== Retiring Members ==
=== Labor ===
- John Tonkin MLA (Melville)
- Harry Fletcher MLA (Fremantle)
- Donald May MLA (Clontarf)
- Tom Hartrey MLA (Boulder-Dundas)

=== Liberal ===
- Ross Hutchinson MLA (Cottesloe)
- Arthur Griffith MLC (North Metropolitan)
- Charles Abbey MLC (West)

=== National Country ===
- Thomas Perry MLC (Lower Central)
- Jack Heitman MLC (Upper West) (died before term ended)

== Legislative Assembly ==
Sitting members are shown in bold text. Successful candidates are highlighted in the relevant colour. Where there is possible confusion, an asterisk (*) is also used.

Electorate	Held by	Labor candidate	Coalition candidate	Other candidates
Albany	Liberal	Ray Wood	**Leon Watt** (Lib)	
Ascot	Labor	**Mal Bryce**	John Bamford (Lib)	
Avon	Labor	**Ken McIver**	Kelvin Bulloch (Lib)	
Balcatta	Labor	**Brian Burke**	Geoffrey Hasler (Lib)	
Bunbury	Liberal	David Smith	**John Sibson** (Lib)	
Canning	Labor	**Tom Bateman**	Richard Shellabear (Lib)	
Clontarf	Labor	Colin Puls	Tony Williams (Lib)	
Cockburn	Labor	**Don Taylor**	George Grljusich (Lib)	
Collie	Labor	**Tom Jones**	Maurice Williams (Lib)	
Cottesloe	Liberal	Howard Olney	Bill Hassell (Lib)	
Dale	Liberal	Michael Marsh	**Cyril Rushton** (Lib)	
Darling Range	Liberal	William O'Brien	**George Spriggs** (Lib)	
Dianella	Labor	Keith Wilson	Peter Foeken (Lib)	
East Melville	Liberal	Lionel Christensen	**Des O'Neil** (Lib)	
Floreat	Liberal	Hilary Snell	**Andrew Mensaros** (Lib)	Frank Parry (Ind)
Fremantle	Labor	John Troy	Ernestine Rosenstein (Lib)	
Gascoyne	Liberal	Robert Brown	**Ian Laurance** (Lib)	Robert Phillips (Ind)
Geraldton	Labor	**Jeff Carr**	John Grosse (Lib)	Fiona Ensor (Prog)
Gosnells	Labor	Bob Pearce	Brian Piesse (Lib)	Gordon Stapp (Ind)
Greenough	Liberal	Kenneth Davis	**Reg Tubby** (Lib)	Geoffrey McNeil (Prog)
Kalamunda	Liberal	Shane Baker	**Ian Thompson** (Lib)	
Kalgoorlie	Labor	**Tom Evans**	Stuart Dunkley (Lib)	Graham Mills (Prog)
Karrinyup	Liberal	Peter Rose	**Jim Clarko** (Lib)	
Katanning	NCP	Christopher Bothams	Peter Hatherly (Lib); **Dick Old** (NCP)*	
Kimberley	Liberal	Ernie Bridge	**Alan Ridge** (Lib)	Allan Rees (Ind)
Maylands	Labor	**John Harman**	Brian Dillon (Lib)	
Melville	Labor	Barry Hodge	Daryl Williams (Lib)	
Merredin	NCP	George Banks	Garry Hawks (Lib); **Hendy Cowan** (NCP)*	
Moore	NCP	Ewold Jager	Irwin Barrett-Lennard (Lib); **Bert Crane** (NCP)*	
Morley	Labor	**Arthur Tonkin**	Madge Bicknell (Lib)	
Mount Hawthorn	Labor	**Ronald Bertram**	Brian Morris (Lib)	
Mount Lawley	Liberal	Athol Monck	**Ray O'Connor** (Lib)	Malcolm Hall (Ind)
Mount Marshall	NCP		Harold Lundy (Lib); **Ray McPharlin** (NCP)*	
Mundaring	Labor	**James Moiler**	Tom Herzfeld (Lib)	Bryan Scott-Courtland (Prog)
Murchison-Eyre	Liberal	Patricia Logue	**Peter Coyne** (Lib)	
Murdoch	Labor	Garry Kelly	Barry MacKinnon (Lib)	
Murray	Labor	Noel Truman	**Richard Shalders** (Lib)	
Narrogin	NCP		Francesco Buemi (Lib); **Peter Jones** (NCP)*	
Nedlands	Liberal	Gordon Black	**Charles Court** (Lib)	John Hallam (AP); Graeme Pratt (Ind); James Croasdale (Ind)
Perth	Labor	**Terry Burke**	Hal Colebatch (Lib)	
Pilbara	Liberal	Norm Marlborough	**Brian Sodeman** (Lib)	
Rockingham	Labor	**Mike Barnett**	Ernest England (Lib)	
Roe	Liberal	Dianne Jones	**Geoff Grewar** (Lib)*; Owen Kirwan (NCP)	
Scarborough	Labor	Desmond Moore	**Ray Young** (Lib)	
South Perth	Liberal	Bill Johnson	**Bill Grayden** (Lib)	
Stirling	NCP		Douglas Campbell (Lib); **Matt Stephens** (NCP)*	
Subiaco	Liberal	Wendy Fatin	**Tom Dadour** (Lib)	
Swan	Labor	**Jack Skidmore**	Peter Unger (Lib)	
Vasse	Liberal	Peter Naughton	**Barry Blaikie** (Lib)	Alister Walker (Ind)
Victoria Park	Labor	**Ron Davies**	Michael Smith (Lib)	
Warren	Labor	**David Evans**	Bill King (Lib)	Noel Duggen (Ind)
Wellington	Liberal	Robert Greeve	**June Craig** (Lib)	
Welshpool	Labor	**Colin Jamieson**	Brian Rose (Lib)	
Whitford	Liberal	Marilyn Anthony	**Mick Nanovich** (Lib)	
Yilgarn-Dundas	Labor	Julian Grill	Douglas Daws (Lib)	Jillian van der Woude (Prog)

== Legislative Council ==
Sitting members are shown in bold text. Successful candidates are highlighted in the relevant colour. Where there is possible confusion, an asterisk (*) is also used.

Province	Held by	Labor candidate	Coalition candidate	Other candidates
Central	NCP		Evelyn Carter (Lib); **Norm Baxter*** (NCP)	Adam Nicol (Ind)
East Metropolitan	Labor	**Fred McKenzie**	Paul Nichols (Lib)	
Lower Central	NCP	James Laffer	Anthony Sands (Lib); Winifred Piesse* (NCP)	
Lower North	Labor	**Stan Dellar**	Norman Moore (Lib)	
Lower West	Liberal	Patrick Weir	**Neil McNeill** (Lib)	
Metropolitan	Liberal	Simon French	**John Williams** (Lib)	Syd Negus (Ind); Jeannette Forsyth (Ind)
North	Liberal	Eric Williams	**Bill Withers** (Lib)	
North Metropolitan	Liberal	Graham Burkett	Bob Pike (Lib)	
North-East Metropolitan	Labor	**Lyla Elliott**	Brian Breese (Lib)	
South	Liberal		**David Wordsworth*** (Lib); Eric James (NCP)	Robert Burns (Ind)
South Metropolitan	Labor	**Des Dans**	Peter Shack (Lib)	
South-East	Labor	**Ron Leeson**	Eric Bingley (Lib)	
South-East Metropolitan	Liberal	Nicholas Clarke	**Clive Griffiths** (Lib)	
South West	Liberal	Geoffrey Baker	**Vic Ferry** (Lib)	Stewart Melville (Ind)
Upper West	NCP	Alan Fewster	Michael Flanagan (Lib); Tom McNeil* (NCP)	
West	Liberal	Graham Hawkes	Neil Oliver (Lib)	

== See also ==
- Members of the Western Australian Legislative Assembly, 1974–1977
- Members of the Western Australian Legislative Assembly, 1977–1980
- Members of the Western Australian Legislative Council, 1974–1977
- Members of the Western Australian Legislative Council, 1977–1980
- 1977 Western Australian state election
