= Electoral results for the district of Mundaring =

Western Australian district election results

This is a list of electoral results for the Electoral district of Mundaring in Western Australian state elections.

== Members for Mundaring ==
Member	Party	Term
James Moiler	Labor	1974–1977
Tom Herzfeld	Liberal	1977–1983
Gavan Troy	Labor	1983–1989

== Election results ==
=== Elections in the 1980s ===
1986 Western Australian state election: Mundaring
Party	Candidate	Votes	%	±%
Labor	Gavan Troy	5,170	53.2	+5.2
Liberal	Steven Hart	4,150	42.7	−5.6
Democrats	Rodney Gibbs	398	4.1	+0.5
Total formal votes		9,718	98.1	+0.6
Informal votes		190	1.9	−0.6
Turnout		9,908	91.2	+1.9
Two-party-preferred result
Labor	Gavan Troy	5,374	55.3	+5.2
Liberal	Steven Hart	4,344	44.7	−5.2
Labor hold		Swing	+5.2	

1983 Mundaring state by-election
Party	Candidate	Votes	%	±%
Labor	Gavan Troy	3,645	50.3	+2.3
Liberal	Tom Herzfeld	3,387	46.7	−1.6
Democrats	Bryan Scott-Courtland	182	2.5	−1.1
Independent	Francesco Nesci	31	0.4	+0.4
Total formal votes		7,245	98.6	+1.1
Informal votes		105	1.4	−1.1
Turnout		7,350	79.6	−9.7
Labor hold		Swing	N/A	

- Preferences were not distributed.

1983 Western Australian state election: Mundaring
Party	Candidate	Votes	%	±%
Liberal	Tom Herzfeld	3,886	48.3	
Labor	Gavan Troy	3,862	48.0	
Democrats	Bryan Scott-Courtland	292	3.6	
Total formal votes		8,040	97.5	
Informal votes		202	2.5	
Turnout		8,242	89.3	
Two-party-preferred result
Labor	Gavan Troy	4,028	50.1	
Liberal	Tom Herzfeld	4,012	49.9	
Labor gain from Liberal		Swing		

1980 Western Australian state election: Mundaring
Party	Candidate	Votes	%	±%
Liberal	Tom Herzfeld	3,588	46.5	−2.7
Labor	William Bartholomaeus	3,427	44.4	−2.5
National Country	Michael Johnson	697	9.0	+9.0
Total formal votes		7,712	97.1	+0.7
Informal votes		226	2.9	−0.7
Turnout		7,938	89.1	−0.6
Two-party-preferred result
Liberal	Tom Herzfeld	4,125	53.5	+1.3
Labor	William Batholomaeus	3,587	46.5	−1.3
Liberal hold		Swing	+1.3	

=== Elections in the 1970s ===
1977 Western Australian state election: Mundaring
Party	Candidate	Votes	%	±%
Liberal	Tom Herzfeld	3,409	49.2	
Labor	James Moiler	3,250	46.9	
Progress	Bryan Scott-Courtland	274	3.9	
Total formal votes		6,933	96.4	
Informal votes		257	3.6	
Turnout		7,190	89.7	
Two-party-preferred result
Liberal	Tom Herzfeld	3,617	52.2	+3.8
Labor	James Moiler	3,316	47.8	−3.8
Liberal gain from Labor		Swing	+3.8	

1974 Western Australian state election: Mundaring
Party	Candidate	Votes	%	±%
Labor	James Moiler	4,119	54.5	
Liberal	Andrew Hugh	2,803	37.1	
National Alliance	Ivan Sands	640	8.5	
Total formal votes		7,562	97.4	
Informal votes		203	2.6	
Turnout		7,765	91.1	
Two-party-preferred result
Labor	James Moiler	4,215	55.7	
Liberal	Andrew Hugh	3,347	44.3	
Labor hold		Swing		
