= Members of the Western Australian Legislative Assembly, 1977–1980 =

This is a list of members of the Western Australian Legislative Assembly from 1977 to 1980:

Name	Party	District	Years in office
Mike Barnett	Labor	Rockingham	1974–1996
Tom Bateman	Labor	Canning	1968–1989
Ron Bertram	Labor	Mount Hawthorn	1968–1989
Barry Blaikie	Liberal	Vasse	1971–1996
Mal Bryce	Labor	Ascot	1971–1988
Brian Burke	Labor	Balcatta	1973–1988
Terry Burke	Labor	Perth	1968–1987
Jeff Carr	Labor	Geraldton	1974–1991
Jim Clarko	Liberal	Karrinyup	1974–1996
Sir Charles Court	Liberal	Nedlands	1953–1982
Hendy Cowan	National/NP^{[X]}	Merredin	1974–2001
Peter Coyne	Liberal	Murchison-Eyre	1971–1986
June Craig	Liberal	Wellington	1974–1983
Bert Crane	National/NCP^{[X]}	Moore	1974–1989
Tom Dadour	Liberal	Subiaco	1971–1986
Ron Davies	Labor	Victoria Park	1961–1986
David Evans	Labor	Warren	1968–1989
Tom Evans	Labor	Kalgoorlie	1956–1980
Bill Grayden	Liberal	South Perth	1947–1949; 1956–1993
Geoff Grewar	Liberal	Roe	1974–1983
Julian Grill	Labor	Yilgarn-Dundas	1977–2001
John Harman	Labor	Maylands	1968–1986
Bill Hassell	Liberal	Cottesloe	1977–1990
Tom Herzfeld	Liberal	Mundaring	1977–1983
Barry Hodge	Labor	Melville	1977–1989
Colin Jamieson	Labor	Welshpool	1953–1986
Peter Jones	National/NCP^{[X]}	Narrogin	1974–1986
Tom Jones	Labor	Collie	1968–1989
Ian Laurance	Liberal	Gascoyne	1974–1987
Ken McIver	Labor	Avon	1968–1986
Barry MacKinnon	Liberal	Murdoch	1977–1993
Ray McPharlin	National/NP^{[X]}	Mount Marshall	1967–1983
Andrew Mensaros	Liberal	Floreat	1968–1991
Mick Nanovich	Liberal	Whitford	1974–1983
Ray O'Connor	Liberal	Mount Lawley	1959–1984
Dick Old	National/NCP^{[X]}	Katanning	1974–1986
Des O'Neil	Liberal	East Melville	1959–1980
Bob Pearce	Labor	Gosnells	1977–1993
Alan Ridge^{1}	Liberal	Kimberley	1968–1980
Cyril Rushton	Liberal	Dale	1965–1988
Richard Shalders	Liberal	Murray	1974–1983
John Sibson	Liberal	Bunbury	1973–1983
Jack Skidmore	Labor	Swan	1974–1982
Brian Sodeman	Liberal	Pilbara	1974–1983
George Spriggs	Liberal	Darling Range	1977–1987
Matt Stephens	National/NP^{[X]}	Stirling	1971–1989
Don Taylor	Labor	Cockburn	1968–1984
Ian Thompson	Liberal	Kalamunda	1971–1993
Arthur Tonkin	Labor	Morley	1971–1987
John Troy	Labor	Fremantle	1977–1980
Reg Tubby	Liberal	Greenough	1975–1989
Leon Watt	Liberal	Albany	1974–1993
Tony Williams	Liberal	Clontarf	1977–1989
Keith Wilson	Labor	Dianella	1977–1993
Ray Young	Liberal	Scarborough	1971–1983

== Notes ==
^{1} At the 1977 election, Liberal member and candidate Alan Ridge won the seat of Kimberley by 93 votes against the Labor candidate Ernie Bridge. Both sides alleged irregularities, and upon a petition against Ridge's election, a fresh election was ordered for 17 December 1977, which was won by Ridge.
^{X} In August 1978, a new party, the National Party, was formed to accommodate National Country MPs who had split from their party over the coalition question. The National Country Party (NCP) remained in coalition with the Liberal Party, whilst the National Party (NP) occupied the cross-benches.

== Sources ==
- "Former Members" (PDF). Parliament of Western Australia. 2011. Archived from the original (PDF) on 7 August 2011.
