= Electoral results for the district of Stirling =

Western Australian district election results

This is a list of electoral results for the Electoral district of Stirling in Western Australian state elections.

== Members for Stirling ==
Member	Party	Term
Arthur Watts	Country	1950–1962
Clayton Mitchell	Country	1962–1971
Matt Stephens	Country	1971–1975
Matt Stephens	National Country	1975–1978
Matt Stephens	National (NP)	1978–1985
Matt Stephens	National	1985–1989
Monty House	National	1989–2005
Terry Redman	National	2005–2008

== Election results ==
=== Elections in the 2000s ===
2005 Western Australian state election: Stirling
Party	Candidate	Votes	%	±%
Liberal	Ron Scott	3,333	26.4	+26.4
National	Terry Redman	2,735	21.7	−15.4
Labor	Jan Benson-Lidholm	2,500	19.8	+1.3
Independent	Vicki Brown	1,901	15.1	+15.1
Greens	Diane Evers	1,090	8.6	−4.3
Christian Democrats	Norm Baker	429	3.4	+3.4
Family First	Terry Dixon	384	3.0	+3.0
One Nation	Darius Crowe	255	2.0	−15.8
Total formal votes		12,627	95.6	−1.2
Informal votes		588	4.4	+1.2
Turnout		13,215	92.0	
Two-party-preferred result
National	Terry Redman	7,851	62.7	+0.8
Labor	Jan Benson-Lidholm	4,665	37.3	−0.8
Two-candidate-preferred result
National	Terry Redman	7,191	57.0	−5.0
Liberal	Ron Scott	5,417	43.0	+43.0
National hold		Swing	−5.0	

2001 Western Australian state election: Stirling
Party	Candidate	Votes	%	±%
National	Monty House	4,572	37.3	−29.4
Labor	Ian Bishop	2,244	18.3	+1.8
One Nation	Darius Crowe	2,182	17.8	+17.8
Independent	Ken Drummond	1,705	13.9	+13.9
Greens	Paul Llewellyn	1,542	12.6	−0.1
Total formal votes		12,245	96.8	+0.4
Informal votes		407	3.2	−0.4
Turnout		12,652	91.8	
Two-party-preferred result
National	Monty House	7,540	62.4	−11.7
Labor	Ian Bishop	4,537	37.6	+11.7
National hold		Swing	−11.7	

=== Elections in the 1990s ===
1996 Western Australian state election: Stirling
Party	Candidate	Votes	%	±%
National	Monty House	7,569	66.7	+15.5
Labor	Barry Christy	1,870	16.5	+0.3
Greens	Paul Llewellyn	1,436	12.7	+5.5
Democrats	Gaida Neggo	469	4.1	+2.4
Total formal votes		11,344	96.4	−0.7
Informal votes		425	3.6	+0.7
Turnout		11,769	91.8	
Two-party-preferred result
National	Monty House	8,395	74.1	−3.1
Labor	Barry Christy	2,932	25.9	+3.1
National hold		Swing	−3.1	

1993 Western Australian state election: Stirling
Party	Candidate	Votes	%	±%
National	Monty House	5,896	52.2	+9.8
Liberal	James Barrow	2,388	21.1	−8.7
Labor	Anthony Hughes	1,882	16.7	−4.7
Greens	Pamela Rumble	772	6.8	+6.8
Democrats	Maurice Deane	206	1.8	+1.8
CALM Resistance Movement	William North	153	1.4	+1.4
Total formal votes		11,297	97.2	+1.8
Informal votes		328	2.8	−1.8
Turnout		11,625	95.1	+2.7
Two-candidate-preferred result
National	Monty House	8,505	75.3	+10.2
Liberal	James Barrow	2,792	24.7	−10.2
National hold		Swing	+10.2	

=== Elections in the 1980s ===
1989 Western Australian state election: Stirling
Party	Candidate	Votes	%	±%
National	Monty House	4,090	42.4	−19.1
Liberal	Thomas Knight	2,870	29.8	−7.0
Labor	Lesley-Ann Hoare	2,060	21.4	+19.8
Grey Power	Paul Ensor	619	6.4	+6.4
Total formal votes		9,639	95.4	
Informal votes		466	4.6	
Turnout		10,105	92.7	
Two-candidate-preferred result
National	Monty House	6,278	65.1	+2.2
Liberal	Thomas Knight	3,361	34.9	−2.2
National hold		Swing	+2.2	

1986 Western Australian state election: Stirling
Party	Candidate	Votes	%	±%
National	Matt Stephens	5,670	62.2	+8.6
Liberal	Peter Skinner	3,443	37.8	+1.6
Total formal votes		9,113	97.2	+0.1
Informal votes		255	2.8	−0.1
Turnout		9,368	93.7	+2.8
National hold		Swing	+6.1	

1983 Western Australian state election: Stirling
Party	Candidate	Votes	%	±%
National	Matt Stephens	4,080	53.6	
Liberal	Peter Skinner	2,761	36.2	
National Country	Thomas Buxton	775	10.2	
Total formal votes		7,616	97.1	
Informal votes		225	2.9	
Turnout		7,841	90.9	
Two-candidate-preferred result
National	Matt Stephens	4,273	56.1	
Liberal	Peter Skinner	3,343	43.9	
National hold		Swing		

1980 Western Australian state election: Stirling
Party	Candidate	Votes	%	±%
National	Matt Stephens	4,698	57.7	+57.7
Liberal	Gary Pollett	2,224	27.3	−1.4
National Country	Peter Squire	1,224	15.0	−56.3
Total formal votes		8,146	96.9	+0.4
Informal votes		263	3.1	−0.4
Turnout		8,409	92.3	−1.0
Two-candidate-preferred result
National	Matt Stephens	5,004	61.4	+61.4
Liberal	Gary Pollett	3,142	38.6	+9.9
National gain from National Country		Swing	N/A	

=== Elections in the 1970s ===
1977 Western Australian state election: Stirling
Party	Candidate	Votes	%	±%
National Country	Matt Stephens	5,175	71.3	
Liberal	Douglas Campbell	2,079	28.7	
Total formal votes		7,254	96.5	
Informal votes		262	3.5	
Turnout		7,516	93.3	
National Country hold		Swing	N/A	

1974 Western Australian state election: Stirling
Party	Candidate	Votes	%	±%
National Alliance	Matt Stephens	3,775	54.4	
Liberal	Glen Mitchell	1,930	27.8	
Labor	Eric Bromilow	1,238	17.8	
Total formal votes		6,943	97.7	
Informal votes		161	2.3	
Turnout		7,104	91.5	
Two-party-preferred result
National Alliance	Matt Stephens	4,889	70.4	
Labor	Eric Bromilow	2,054	29.6	
National Alliance hold		Swing		

- Preferences were not distributed between the National Alliance and Liberal candidates for Stirling.

1971 Western Australian state election: Stirling
Party	Candidate	Votes	%	±%
Labor	Ray Wood	2,020	30.9	+30.9
Liberal	Peter Drummond	1,769	27.0	+27.0
Country	Matt Stephens	1,758	26.9	−73.1
Independent	George Brookes	522	8.0	+8.0
Democratic Labor	Peter Sullivan	367	5.6	+5.6
Independent	Duncan Hordacre	111	1.7	+1.7
Total formal votes		6,547	96.2	
Informal votes		256	3.8	
Turnout		6,803	93.3	
Two-party-preferred result
Country	Matt Stephens	3,941	60.2	−39.8
Labor	Ray Wood	2,606	39.8	+39.8
Country hold		Swing	N/A	

=== Elections in the 1960s ===
1968 Western Australian state election: Stirling
Party	Candidate	Votes	%	±%
Country	Clayton Mitchell	unopposed		
Country hold		Swing		

1965 Western Australian state election: Stirling
Party	Candidate	Votes	%	±%
Country	Clayton Mitchell	unopposed		
Country hold		Swing		

1962 Western Australian state election: Stirling
Party	Candidate	Votes	%	±%
Country	Clayton Mitchell	1,651	35.0	
Independent	Robin Faulkner	1,261	26.7	
Liberal and Country	Roy Dix	866	18.4	
Country	John Lyons	752	15.9	
Independent	Malcol Bateman	185	3.9	
Total formal votes		4,715	97.9	
Informal votes		101	2.1	
Turnout		4,816	92.4	
Two-candidate-preferred result
Country	Clayton Mitchell	2,956	62.7	
Independent	Robin Faulkner	1,759	37.3	
Country hold		Swing		

=== Elections in the 1950s ===
1959 Western Australian state election: Stirling
Party	Candidate	Votes	%	±%
Country	Arthur Watts	unopposed		
Country hold		Swing		

1956 Western Australian state election: Stirling
Party	Candidate	Votes	%	±%
Country	Arthur Watts	unopposed		
Country hold		Swing		

1953 Western Australian state election: Stirling
Party	Candidate	Votes	%	±%
Country	Arthur Watts	unopposed		
Country hold		Swing		

1950 Western Australian state election: Stirling
Party	Candidate	Votes	%	±%
Country	Arthur Watts	unopposed		
Country hold		Swing		
