= Electoral results for the district of East Melville =

Western Australian district election results

This is a list of electoral results for the Electoral district of East Melville in Western Australian state elections.

== Members for East Melville ==
Member	Party	Term
Des O'Neil	Liberal Country League	1962–1968
Des O'Neil	Liberal	1968–1980
Anthony Trethowan	Liberal	1980–1986
Richard Lewis	Liberal	1986–1989

== Election results ==
=== Elections in the 1980s ===
1986 Western Australian state election: East Melville
Party	Candidate	Votes	%	±%
Liberal	Richard Lewis	9,491	60.0	+6.4
Labor	Gary Low	6,330	40.0	+4.2
Total formal votes		15,821	97.7	−0.1
Informal votes		379	2.3	+0.1
Turnout		16,200	92.2	−1.5
Liberal hold		Swing	+1.1	

1983 Western Australian state election: East Melville
Party	Candidate	Votes	%	±%
Liberal	Anthony Trethowan	7,907	53.6	
Labor	Carmen Lawrence	5,281	35.8	
Democrats	Shirley De La Hunty	1,565	10.6	
Total formal votes		14,753	97.8	
Informal votes		330	2.2	
Turnout		15,083	93.7	
Two-party-preferred result
Liberal	Anthony Trethowan	8,690	58.9	
Labor	Carmen Lawrence	6,063	41.1	
Liberal hold		Swing		

1980 Western Australian state election: East Melville
Party	Candidate	Votes	%	±%
Liberal	Anthony Trethowan	unopposed		
Liberal hold		Swing		

=== Elections in the 1970s ===
1977 Western Australian state election: East Melville
Party	Candidate	Votes	%	±%
Liberal	Des O'Neil	9,720	65.5	
Labor	Lionel Christensen	5,119	34.5	
Total formal votes		14,839	97.6	
Informal votes		359	2.4	
Turnout		15,198	91.8	
Liberal hold		Swing	+6.1	

1974 Western Australian state election: East Melville
Party	Candidate	Votes	%	±%
Liberal	Des O'Neil	8,029	52.8	
Labor	Percy Johnson	6,079	40.0	
National Alliance	Rosemary Taboni	1,097	7.2	
Total formal votes		15,205	97.1	
Informal votes		452	2.9	
Turnout		15,657	91.4	
Two-party-preferred result
Liberal	Des O'Neil	8,961	58.9	
Labor	Percy Johnson	6,244	41.1	
Liberal hold		Swing		

1971 Western Australian state election: East Melville
Party	Candidate	Votes	%	±%
Liberal	Des O'Neil	8,839	59.4	−15.5
Labor	Herman Baer	4,784	32.2	+32.2
Democratic Labor	Rosemary Lorrimar	1,257	8.4	+8.4
Total formal votes		14,880	97.7	+3.1
Informal votes		357	2.3	−3.1
Turnout		15,237	92.5	−0.4
Two-party-preferred result
Liberal	Des O'Neil	9,907	66.6	−2.4
Labor	Herman Baer	4,973	33.4	+2.4
Liberal hold		Swing	−2.4	

=== Elections in the 1960s ===
1968 Western Australian state election: East Melville
Party	Candidate	Votes	%	±%
Liberal and Country	Des O'Neil	8,800	74.9	
Communist	Victor Williams	1,694	14.4	
Independent	Ralph Von Paleske	1,249	10.6	
Total formal votes		11,743	94.6	
Informal votes		666	5.4	
Turnout		12,409	92.9	
Two-candidate-preferred result
Liberal and Country	Des O'Neil	9,425	80.3	
Communist	Victor Williams	2,318	19.7	
Liberal and Country hold		Swing		

1965 Western Australian state election: East Melville
Party	Candidate	Votes	%	±%
Liberal and Country	Des O'Neil	6,773	59.4	−4.2
Independent	Louis Joseph	4,630	40.6	+40.6
Total formal votes		11,403	95.1	−4.0
Informal votes		585	4.9	+4.0
Turnout		11,988	93.2	−1.6
Liberal and Country hold		Swing	N/A	

1962 Western Australian state election: East Melville
Party	Candidate	Votes	%	±%
Liberal and Country	Des O'Neil	6,527	63.6	
Labor	Mervyn Jahn	3,739	36.4	
Total formal votes		10,266	99.1	
Informal votes		90	0.9	
Turnout		10,356	94.8	
Liberal and Country hold		Swing		
