= Electoral results for the district of Yilgarn-Dundas =

Western Australian district election results

This is a list of electoral results for the Electoral district of Yilgarn-Dundas in Western Australian state elections.

== Members for Yilgarn-Dundas ==
Member	Party	Term
Julian Grill	Labor	1977–1983

== Election results ==
=== Elections in the 1980s ===
1980 Western Australian state election: Yilgarn-Dundas
Party	Candidate	Votes	%	±%
Labor	Julian Grill	4,242	72.8	−11.0
Liberal	James Mazza	1,584	27.2	−7.3
Total formal votes		5,826	94.5	+0.4
Informal votes		339	5.5	−0.4
Turnout		6,165	82.9	−4.2
Labor hold		Swing	+10.1	

=== Elections in the 1970s ===
1977 Western Australian state election: Yilgarn-Dundas
Party	Candidate	Votes	%	±%
Labor	Julian Grill	4,209	61.8	
Liberal	Douglas Daws	2,352	34.5	
Progress	Jillian van der Woude	247	3.6	
Total formal votes		6,808	94.1	
Informal votes		429	5.9	
Turnout		7,237	87.1	
Two-party-preferred result
Labor	Julian Grill	4,271	62.7	+1.2
Liberal	Douglas Daws	2,537	37.3	−1.2
Labor hold		Swing	+1.2	
