= Results of the 1977 Western Australian state election (Legislative Council) =

Western Australian state election, 19 February 1977 Legislative Council
Enrolled voters	663,113				
Votes cast	601,442		Turnout	90.70%	+0.76%
Informal votes	26,160		Informal	4.35%	–0.44%
Summary of votes by party
Party	Primary votes	%	Swing	Seats won	Seats held
Liberal	289,416	50.31%	+4.88%	9	18
Labor	241,359	41.95%	–5.28%	4	10
National Country	31,974	5.56%	–1.78%	3	4
Independent	12,533	2.18%	+2.18%	0	0
Total	575,282			16	32
Two-party-preferred
Liberal/NCP	319,952	55.62%	+3.72%		
Labor	255,330	44.38%	–3.72%		

This is a list of electoral region results for the Western Australian Legislative Council in the 1977 Western Australian state election.

== Results by electoral province ==
=== Central ===
1977 Western Australian state election: Central Province
Party	Candidate	Votes	%	±%
National Country	Norm Baxter	10,936	53.1	
Liberal	Evelyn Carter	6,113	29.7	
Independent	Adam Nicol	3,563	17.3	
Total formal votes		20,612	94.3	
Informal votes		1,254	5.7	
Turnout		21,866	92.9	
National Country hold		Swing		

- Preferences were not distributed.

=== East Metropolitan ===
1977 Western Australian state election: East Metropolitan Province
Party	Candidate	Votes	%	±%
Labor	Fred McKenzie	31,288	57.1	
Liberal	Paul Nichols	23,527	42.9	
Total formal votes		54,815	94.9	
Informal votes		2,930	5.1	
Turnout		57,745	90.1	
Labor hold		Swing		

=== Lower Central ===
1977 Western Australian state election: Lower Central Province
Party	Candidate	Votes	%	±%
Labor	James Laffer	8,305	37.5	
National Country	Winifred Piesse	7,277	32.9	
Liberal	Anthony Sands	6,564	29.6	
Total formal votes		22,146	90.3	
Informal votes		875	3.8	
Turnout		23,021	93.8	
Two-party-preferred result
National Country	Winifred Piesse	13,195	59.6	
Labor	James Laffer	8,951	40.4	
National Country hold		Swing		

=== Lower North ===
1977 Western Australian state election: Lower North Province
Party	Candidate	Votes	%	±%
Liberal	Norman Moore	2,935	61.5	
Labor	Stan Dellar	1,838	38.5	
Total formal votes		4,773	96.0	
Informal votes		199	4.0	
Turnout		4,972	86.6	
Liberal gain from Labor		Swing		

=== Lower West ===
1977 Western Australian state election: Lower West Province
Party	Candidate	Votes	%	±%
Liberal	Neil McNeill	12,830	55.5	
Labor	Patrick Weir	10,302	44.5	
Total formal votes		23,132	96.2	
Informal votes		917	3.8	
Turnout		24,049	92.4	
Liberal hold		Swing		

=== Metropolitan ===
1977 Western Australian state election: Metropolitan Province
Party	Candidate	Votes	%	±%
Liberal	Richard Williams	39,207	59.1	
Labor	Simon French	22,827	34.4	
Independent	Syd Negus	3,187	4.8	
Independent	Jeannette Forsyth	1,150	1.7	
Total formal votes		66,371	96.3	
Informal votes		2,545	3.7	
Turnout		68,916	89.0	
Liberal hold		Swing		

- Preferences were not distributed.

=== North Province ===
1977 Western Australian state election: North Province
Party	Candidate	Votes	%	±%
Liberal	Bill Withers	7,930	53.6	
Labor	Eric Williams	6,858	46.4	
Total formal votes		14,788	94.6	
Informal votes		846	5.4	
Turnout		15,634	82.8	
Liberal hold		Swing		

=== North Metropolitan ===
1977 Western Australian state election: North Metropolitan Province
Party	Candidate	Votes	%	±%
Liberal	Bob Pike	39,935	53.9	
Labor	Graham Burkett	34,177	46.1	
Total formal votes		74,112	95.9	
Informal votes		3,130	4.1	
Turnout		77,242	90.9	
Liberal hold		Swing		

=== North-East Metropolitan ===
1977 Western Australian state election: North-East Metropolitan Province
Party	Candidate	Votes	%	±%
Labor	Lyla Elliott	38,769	54.2	
Liberal	Brian Breese	32,765	45.8	
Total formal votes		71,534	95.3	
Informal votes		3,504	4.7	
Turnout		75,038	90.6	
Labor hold		Swing		

=== South Province ===
1977 Western Australian state election: South Province
Party	Candidate	Votes	%	±%
Liberal	David Wordsworth	11,315	52.6	
National Country	Eric James	7,619	35.5	
Independent	Robert Burns	2,558	11.9	
Total formal votes		21,492	94.9	
Informal votes		1,099	5.1	
Turnout		22,591	92.6	
Liberal hold		Swing		

=== South Metropolitan ===
1977 Western Australian state election: South Metropolitan Province
Party	Candidate	Votes	%	±%
Labor	Des Dans	30,103	52.9	
Liberal	Peter Shack	26,834	47.1	
Total formal votes		56,937	95.7	
Informal votes		2,573	4.3	
Turnout		59,510	91.4	
Labor hold		Swing		

=== South-East ===
1977 Western Australian state election: South-East Province
Party	Candidate	Votes	%	±%
Labor	Ron Leeson	10,499	51.5	
Liberal	Eric Bingley	9,894	48.5	
Total formal votes		20,393	94.6	
Informal votes		1,169	5.4	
Turnout		21,562	89.2	
Labor hold		Swing		

=== South-East Metropolitan ===
1977 Western Australian state election: South-East Metropolitan Province
Party	Candidate	Votes	%	±%
Liberal	Clive Griffiths	33,134	57.9	
Labor	Nicholas Clarke	24,121	42.1	
Total formal votes		57,255	96.1	
Informal votes		2,314	3.9	
Turnout		59,569	91.0	
Liberal hold		Swing		

=== South West ===
1977 Western Australian state election: South West Province
Party	Candidate	Votes	%	±%
Liberal	Vic Ferry	13,158	56.4	
Labor	Geoffrey Baker	8,075	34.6	
Independent	Stewart Melville	2,075	8.9	
Total formal votes		23,308	96.1	
Informal votes		933	3.9	
Turnout		24,241	93.5	
Liberal hold		Swing		

- Preferences were not distributed.

=== Upper West ===
1977 Western Australian state election: Upper West Province
Party	Candidate	Votes	%	±%
Liberal	Michael Flanagan	10,420	46.0	
National Country	Tom McNeil	6,142	27.1	
Labor	Alan Fewster	6,091	26.9	
Total formal votes		22,653	96.1	
Informal votes		915	3.9	
Turnout		23,568	91.8	
Two-candidate-preferred result
National Country	Tom McNeil	11,471	50.6	
Liberal	Michael Flanagan	11,182	49.4	
National Country hold		Swing		

=== West ===
1977 Western Australian state election: West Province
Party	Candidate	Votes	%	±%
Liberal	Neil Oliver	12,855	61.3	
Labor	Graham Hawkes	8,106	38.7	
Total formal votes		20,961	95.6	
Informal votes		957	4.4	
Turnout		21,918	90.1	
Liberal hold		Swing		

== See also ==
- Results of the Western Australian state election, 1977 (Legislative Assembly)
- 1977 Western Australian state election
- Candidates of the 1977 Western Australian state election
- Members of the Western Australian Legislative Council, 1977–1980
