= Electoral results for the district of Whitford =

Western Australian district election results

This is a list of electoral results for the Electoral district of Whitford in Western Australian state elections.

== Members for Whitford ==
Member	Party	Term
Mick Nanovich	Liberal	1977–1983
Pam Beggs	Labor	1983–1993
Rob Johnson	Liberal	1993–1996

== Election results ==
=== Elections in the 1990s ===
1993 Western Australian state election: Whitford
Party	Candidate	Votes	%	±%
Liberal	Rob Johnson	8,913	46.4	+11.3
Labor	Pam Beggs	7,045	36.7	−7.0
Independent	Jannifer Pearce	884	4.6	+4.6
Greens	Miguel Castillo	825	4.3	+4.3
Democrats	Geoffrey Curtis	798	4.2	+4.2
Independent	Norma Rundle	731	3.8	+3.8
Total formal votes		19,196	96.9	+3.1
Informal votes		615	3.1	−3.1
Turnout		19,811	94.9	+2.8
Two-party-preferred result
Liberal	Rob Johnson	10,768	56.1	+7.8
Labor	Pam Beggs	8,428	43.9	−7.8
Liberal gain from Labor		Swing	+7.8	

=== Elections in the 1980s ===
1989 Western Australian state election: Whitford
Party	Candidate	Votes	%	±%
Labor	Pam Beggs	7,065	43.7	−18.0
Liberal	Peter Harrop	5,670	35.1	+2.1
Independent	John Clifford	2,501	15.5	+15.5
Grey Power	Geoffrey Smart	926	5.7	+5.7
Total formal votes		16,162	93.8	
Informal votes		1,071	6.2	
Turnout		17,233	92.1	
Two-party-preferred result
Labor	Pam Beggs	8,356	51.7	−12.7
Liberal	Peter Harrop	7,806	48.3	+12.7
Labor hold		Swing	−12.7	

1986 Western Australian state election: Whitford
Party	Candidate	Votes	%	±%
Labor	Pam Beggs	12,637	56.5	−1.2
Liberal	Kenneth Schulz	8,318	37.2	−5.1
Democrats	Graeme Major	1,397	6.3	+6.3
Total formal votes		22,352	98.1	0.0
Informal votes		425	1.9	0.0
Turnout		22,777	92.5	+3.9
Two-party-preferred result
Labor	Pam Beggs	13,366	59.8	+2.1
Liberal	Kenneth Schulz	8,986	40.2	−2.1
Labor hold		Swing	+2.1	

1983 Western Australian state election: Whitford
Party	Candidate	Votes	%	±%
Labor	Pam Beggs	8,778	57.7	
Liberal	Darryll Retallack	6,434	42.3	
Total formal votes		15,212	98.1	
Informal votes		287	1.9	
Turnout		15,499	88.6	
Labor gain from Liberal		Swing		

1980 Western Australian state election: Whitford
Party	Candidate	Votes	%	±%
Liberal	Mick Nanovich	13,337	54.5	−7.9
Labor	Nick Griffiths	9,266	37.8	+0.2
Democrats	Harvard Barclay	1,882	7.7	+7.7
Total formal votes		24,485	96.9	−0.9
Informal votes		769	3.1	+0.9
Turnout		25,254	90.4	−2.4
Two-party-preferred result
Liberal	Mick Nanovich	14,278	58.3	−4.1
Labor	Nick Griffiths	10,207	41.7	+4.1
Liberal hold		Swing	−4.1	

=== Elections in the 1970s ===
1977 Western Australian state election: Whitford
Party	Candidate	Votes	%	±%
Liberal	Mick Nanovich	10,660	62.4	
Labor	Marilyn Anthony	6,426	37.6	
Total formal votes		17,086	97.8	
Informal votes		389	2.2	
Turnout		17,475	92.8	
Liberal hold		Swing	+7.5	
