= Electoral results for the district of Applecross =

This is a list of electoral results for the Electoral district of Applecross in Western Australian state elections.

== Members for Applecross ==
Member	Party	Term
Richard Lewis	Liberal	1989–1996

== Election results ==
=== Elections in the 1990s ===
1993 Western Australian state election: Applecross
Party	Candidate	Votes	%	±%
Liberal	Richard Lewis	15,135	67.5	+4.4
Labor	Maryla Rowcroft	5,437	24.3	−4.0
Democrats	Anne Millar	1,834	8.2	+8.2
Total formal votes		22,406	96.8	+2.4
Informal votes		744	3.2	−2.4
Turnout		23,150	94.8	+2.5
Two-party-preferred result
Liberal	Richard Lewis	15,968	71.3	+2.2
Labor	Maryla Rowcroft	6,438	28.7	−2.2
Liberal hold		Swing	+2.2	

=== Elections in the 1980s ===
1989 Western Australian state election: Applecross
Party	Candidate	Votes	%	±%
Liberal	Richard Lewis	11,424	63.1	+2.8
Labor	Margaret Barton	5,126	28.3	−11.2
Grey Power	Anthony Furness	1,544	8.5	+8.5
Total formal votes		18,094	94.4	
Informal votes		1,076	5.6	
Turnout		19,170	92.3	
Two-party-preferred result
Liberal	Richard Lewis	12,497	69.1	+8.7
Labor	Margaret Barton	5,597	30.9	−8.7
Liberal hold		Swing	+8.7	
