= Tracey Roberts (politician) =

Australian politician

Tracey Roberts MP

Member of the Australian Parliament for Pearce
- Incumbent
- Assumed office 21 May 2022
- Preceded by: Christian Porter

Mayor of City of Wanneroo
- In office 17 October 2011 – 21 May 2022
- Preceded by: Jon Kelly
- Succeeded by: Brett Treby (acting)

Personal details
- Born: Manchester, England
- Citizenship: Australian; British (until 2021)
- Party: Labor
- Children: 2
- Occupation: Politician
- Website: traceyforpearce.com.au

Tracey Roberts is an English-born Australian politician. She was elected to the Division of Pearce in the Australian House of Representatives at the 2022 Australian federal election, succeeding Christian Porter. She was a councillor for the City of Wanneroo from 2003 to 2022, and mayor from 2011 to 2022. She was also the president of the Western Australian Local Government Association from March 2020 to 2022, a vice president of the Australian Local Government Association.

== Early life ==
Tracey Roberts was born in Manchester, England. In the mid-1980s, she emigrated from the United Kingdom to Australia.

== Career ==
Roberts was first elected to the Coastal Ward of the City of Wanneroo council in May 2003. She was elected deputy mayor in 2009, and mayor in 2011, receiving 37.72% of the vote. She was elected to a second term as Mayor in October 2015, receiving 67% of the vote. In October 2019, she was elected to a third term as mayor, with 68.82% of the vote. Her term expired in October 2023.

In September 2015, she was elected Deputy President of the Western Australian Local Government Association (WALGA). She was elected vice president of the Australian Local Government Association in 2018. In 2019, she was awarded life membership of WALGA. Roberts was elected President of WALGA on 4 March 2020, following the expiration of previous president Lynne Craigie's four-year term. On 1 December 2021, she resigned as president of WALGA, after being selected as Labors candidate for the division of Pearce.

She was appointed by the state government to the State Recovery Advisory Group in May 2020 as a representative of WALGA, to guide the state's economic recovery from the COVID-19 pandemic.

In August 2021, Roberts was endorsed by the Australian Labor Party as their candidate for the division of Pearce at the 2022 Australian federal election. The division of Pearce covers much of the same area as the City of Wanneroo. This came as the seat's incumbent, Liberal Party MP Christian Porter, faced controversies, including a rape allegation and legal action against the ABC. Porter won the seat with a margin of 7.5% at the 2019 election, but a redistribution between the two elections removed all of the seat's rural territory, reducing the Liberal margin to 5.3%. The seat has never been won by the Labor Party in its 31-year existence. The West Australian said that "the battle for Pearce will be one of the most highly scrutinised during the next Federal election". Roberts was not a Labor member until shortly before being endorsed by the Labor Party, instead being picked by the party due to her high profile in Pearce. She has said that she has always endeavoured to be apolitical as mayor.

On 1 December 2021, Porter announced he would not contest the seat of Pearce at the 2022 election, and he will retire from politics. On 20 December 2021, City of Wanneroo councillor Linda Aitken was chosen to be the Liberal Party's candidate for Pearce.

At the 2022 election on 21 May, Roberts won the seat of Pearce on 59.4 percent of the two-party vote, a swing of 14.6 percent. She was a part of the Labor Left faction, however she was subsequently reported as having defected to the Labor Right faction.

== Personal life ==
Roberts renounced her United Kingdom citizenship in 2021 ahead of the 2022 election in order to comply with Section 44 of the Constitution of Australia. In 2008, she was diagnosed with breast cancer. Her first husband died of Hodgkin's disease in 1995. She has since remarried. She has had one son with each husband. In 2025, she announced a recent diagnosis of multiple systems atrophy affecting her mobility and speech. She committed to serving her full term following the 2025 Australian federal election.

Civic offices
| Preceded by Jon Kelly | Mayor of Wanneroo; 2011–2022 | Succeeded by Linda Aitken |
Parliament of Australia
| Preceded by Christian Porter | Member for Pearce; 2022–present | Incumbent |
