= Tom McNeil =

Australian rules footballer and politician (1929–2020)

Personal information
- Full name: Thomas McNeil
- Born: 9 June 1929; Glasgow, Scotland
- Died: 24 March 2020 (aged 90); Perth, Western Australia.
- Original team: Hampton Scouts
- Height: 178 cm (5 ft 10 in)
- Weight: 66 kg (146 lb)
- Position: Wingman

Playing career^{1}
Years	Club	Games (Goals)
1951–1952	St Kilda	8 (0)
- ^{1} Playing statistics correct to the end of 1952.

Thomas McNeil (9 June 1929 – 24 March 2020) was an Australian rules footballer and politician. He played with St Kilda in the Victorian Football League (VFL) in 1951 and 1952. Disappointed with his treatment during his playing career, McNeil was instrumental in the formation of a players union in 1955, the first attempt at a representative body for VFL players. From 1977 to 1989 he was a member of the Western Australian Legislative Council.

== Early life ==
Born in Glasgow, Scotland on 9 June 1929, McNeil was evacuated with his sister to Australia in 1940, to escape the World War II conflict. Until their parents came over in 1947, they stayed with host families in Melbourne.

McNeil, a wingman, played his early football with Hampton Scouts.

== Football ==
McNeil made his debut for St Kilda in the penultimate round of the 1951 VFL season, at the age of 22.

He did not play in the final round but was in the team again for St Kilda's opening fixture in the 1952 season.

In round seven against Fitzroy, his fourth appearance for the year, he received an eye injury after being struck behind the play. His gash was stitched up by a doctor and he was sent to the Junction Oval cloakroom to recover from the anaesthetic. That night a dance was held at the ground and McNeil, who had not yet recovered, was told to leave. He was later in Punt Road, where he collapsed, still wearing his blood-stained jumper. When a St Kilda club official was informed of his condition he was instructed to catch a taxi home.

He recovered well enough to play in round eight, the solitary win of his career, a 15-point victory over Footscray in the only game ever hosted at Yallourn Oval.

Following a loss to Hawthorn the next weekend, he played the eighth and final game of his VFL career against North Melbourne at Arden Street Oval. During the game he was reported for an incident in the second quarter when he retaliated with North Melbourne forward John Brady. At the tribunal he received a two-week suspension for attempting to trip Brady, who was exonerated of his charge of having struck McNeil. This upset McNeil, as he had not been accompanied to the tribunal by anyone from St Kilda. He subsequently argued with club secretary Sam Ramsay and opted not to train that week. Although he resumed training the following week he was omitted from the reserves. Soon after he quit the club.

He was playing coach of East St Kilda in the 1953.

In 1954 he coached Alexandra and came close to getting the club into a grand final in his only season, missing out after a one-point loss to Seymour.

=== Players' union ===
Later in 1954 he returned to Scotland and in an effort to improve his own coaching visited local soccer clubs to learn their coaching methods. His visit was reported on by a Glasgow newspaper and because of this he was contacted by John Hughes, a Scottish players union representative. The two men formed a friendship and McNeil was introduced to the chairman of the English soccer players' union, Jimmy Guthrie.

Through these relationships, McNeil was inspired to establish a union back in Australia for the VFL, which at the time had no representative body for players. He had been disappointed with his own treatment while at St Kilda and did not want others to experience what he had.

In April 1955 he expressed through the media that he believed VFL players received a rough deal and announced plans to form a players union similar to the British version. Amongst his stated aims was that players were to be notified by the end of a season if they were going to be retained, as was the case in England. He also stated that players should receive free legal representation for any dispute they had with their club and that a special benefit fund should be set up for veteran players.

Seeking permission to address VFL players, McNeil wrote to the club secretaries. He was given permission by Collingwood and St Kilda, but not by Hawthorn, while the Essendon players were said to be uninterested. It was however a Hawthorn player, Pat Cash, that was most interested in McNeil's plans, as was Preston full-back Ted Henrys, a player from the Victorian Football Association (VFA), which he had also contacted. Together they formed a constitution, which was based on both the Scottish Players' Union and the Victorian Fire Brigade Employers' Union.

On 13 May 1955, a meeting was held in Collins Street at Scots Church Hall, attended by a total of 26 players, 18 of them from VFL clubs and the others from the VFA. The VFL players included Ron Barassi, Jack Clarke, Laurie Icke, Thorold Merrett, Tony Ongarello and Stuart Spencer. At the meeting the constitution was ratified and the union formed. McNeil was concerned with the poor attendance, which by the second meeting on 27 June was reduced to just 12 players. Cash was to become president, McNeil the secretary and Henrys treasurer. They planned to register the union with the Commonwealth Court of Conciliation and Arbitration.

The organisation's membership grew to 178 members through the season which accounted for approximately 20% of available players. North Melbourne had 33 players with membership, but the majority were from the VFA. When North Melbourne's Laurie Icke and Mick Grambeau were controversially sacked by their club at the end of the season, the union protested in support of the players. In November, after the sudden death of Sandringham full-forward Bruce Harper, the committee organised a benefit function.

Both the VFL and VFA strongly opposed any players' union, as did the Essendon Football Club. The end came in December when the union was refused registration on technical grounds in a hearing at the Commonwealth Court of Conciliation and Arbitration. It was successfully argued by the VFL that its players were amateurs and therefore could not be considered employees. McNeil declined the option of appealing the decision, due to the cost and the belief that there was not the support required amongst players. The union was disbanded the following year.

== Politics ==
In the 1960s, McNeil went to Western Australia to continue his coaching career and ended up remaining there.

He was elected into the Western Australian Legislative Council in 1977 for the National Country Party (NCP) as a member for Upper West Province, an electorate in the Mid West region. Soon after he joined the breakaway National Party, along with other disaffected members of the NCP, Hendy Cowan, Ray McPharlin and Matt Stephens. He remained in the Legislative Assembly until the end of his fourth term on 21 May 1989.
