= Troy Pickard =

Australian politician and businessman (1973–2022)

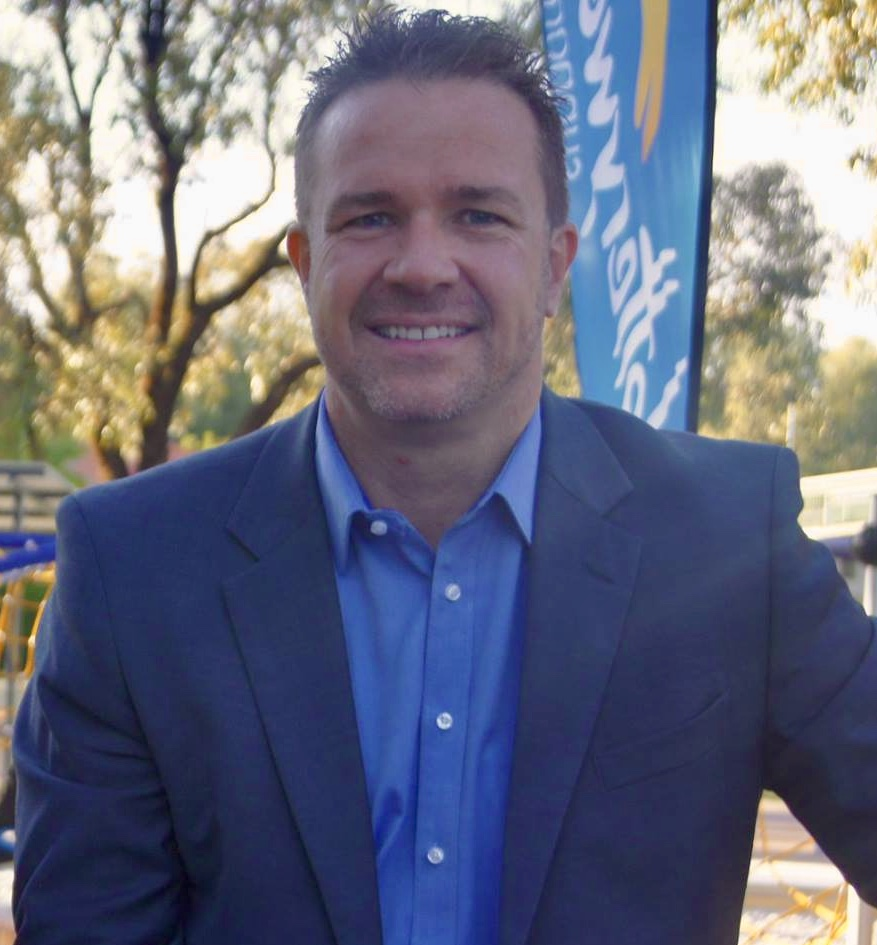
- Pickard in 2016

President of ALGA
- In office 12 November 2014 – 12 November 2016
- Preceded by: Felicity-Ann Lewis
- Succeeded by: David O’Loughlin

President of WALGA
- In office 7 April 2010 – 1 July 2015
- Preceded by: Bill Mitchell
- Succeeded by: Lynne Craigie

Mayor of Joondalup
- In office 6 May 2006 – 23 October 2017
- Preceded by: Council Suspended
- Succeeded by: Albert Jacob

Personal details
- Born: Troy Ernest Pickard; 18 January 1973
- Died: 13 January 2022 (aged 48)
- Party: Liberal
- Children: 3
- Education: Edith Cowan University • University of Western Australia
- Occupation: Politician • businessman
- Awards: See list

Troy Ernest Pickard (18 January 1973 – 13 January 2022) was an Australian local government politician and businessman. He was the deputy mayor of the City of Stirling from 2004 to 2005, mayor of the City of Joondalup from 2006 to 2017, president of the Western Australian Local Government Association from 2010 to 2015, and president of the Australian Local Government Association from 2014 to 2016.

== Local government career ==
Pickard started out in local government in 2001, elected to the coastal ward of the City of Stirling. There, he was deputy mayor from 2004 to 2005. He left the City of Stirling in 2005.

=== Mayor of the City of Joondalup ===
On 6 May 2006, Pickard was elected as the third mayor of the City of Joondalup, and at the age of 33 became the youngest mayor in Western Australia. He won 15% of the vote and beat ten other candidates. This was three years after the previous Joondalup council had been sacked. Between December 2003 and his election May 2006, the City of Joondalup was controlled by state government appointed commissioners. He was re-elected in 2009, gaining 54% of the vote and beating two other candidates, and in 2013, gaining 57% of the vote and beating one other candidate. Although he initially said he would contest the 2017 election, he eventually chose not to. He was succeeded as mayor by former state government minister Albert Jacob.

During his tenure, Pickard was involved in planning for the Ocean Reef Marina, oversaw high-rise development in the Joondalup central business district as well as sporting infrastructure such as the Warwick Hockey Centre (Later renamed the Troy Pickard Hockey Centre).

In 2015, Pickard, alongside the mayors of Stirling and Wanneroo, announced the Tri-Cities Alliance. The collaboration sought to coordinate funding, promote economic growth and advocate for infrastructure investment from the federal and state governments.

=== President of the Western Australian Local Government Association ===
In 2007, Pickard was elected deputy president of the Western Australian Local Government Association (WALGA). On 7 April 2010, Pickard was elected as the president of WALGA, after previous president Bill Mitchell resigned.

During Pickard's presidency, WALGA contributed to the Regional Subsidiary Bill, had input into the Building Act 2011 and the Dog Act 2013, made changes to the Elected Member remuneration and Code of Conduct, achieved funding agreements to benefit Local Government members as well as the planning and construction of WALGA's new building.

He stayed in his role as president of WALGA until 1 July 2015, wanting to stay until the end of the state government's local government mergers.

=== President of the Australian Local Government Association ===
In 2007, Pickard became a director of the Australian Local Government Association (ALGA), and in 2010 became a vice president.

On 12 November 2014, Pickard was elected president of ALGA, becoming the first Western Australian to hold the position in 30 years. His presidency coincided with the federal government's freeze on the indexation of Financial Assistance Grants, the White Paper on Reform of the Federation and the debate on the permanency of the Roads to Recovery funding. During his tenure the indexation on Financial Assistance Grants was restored, and $1.105 billion in Roads to Recovery funding was secured, which was the biggest single funding injection local government had received from the federal government.

In November 2016, Pickard left his role as president of ALGA after serving one term.

== Political and international activities ==
Pickard was a long-term member of the Liberal Party, and briefly served as president of its Stirling division.

In 2008, Pickard was appointed to the Australian Council of Local Government.

Pickard was a member of the ICLEI Global Executive Committee from 2012 to 2018. He was a delegate at the 2015 United Nations Climate Change Conference, where the City of Joondalup's climate change strategy was showcased.

== Outside local government ==
In June 2016, Pickard founded Franchise Fusion Group, which was the Western Australian master franchisee of the Bucking Bull roast meat restaurant chain. In late 2017, Pickard opened a nitro coffee shop named Primal Pantry in Brookfield Place. Primal Pantry was operated by a subsidiary of Franchise Fusion Group. By January 2020, Franchise Fusion Group and its subsidiaries were in liquidation, with over $1 million of creditor claims.

Pickard served as the chairman of Cancer Council's Relay for Life Joondalup-Wanneroo for a decade.

== Controversies ==
In April 2012, Joondalup councillor Brian Corr accused Pickard of assault during a council meeting on 3 April. The police investigation was concluded in June 2012, with no charges laid.

In January 2018, Pickard was charged with assault occasioning bodily harm, with police alleging he threw a cup of coffee at his neighbour's face. In March 2019, he went on trial, and in April 2019, he was acquitted, with CCTV unable to show whether Pickard's neighbour had sprayed him with a hose in the moments before.

== Death ==
Pickard died suddenly on 13 January 2022, at the age of 48.

== Awards ==
Pickard received the following awards:

- Business News 40under40 Award (2002)
- WALGA Distinguished Service Award (2005)
- Business News 40under40 Award (2007)
- The Church of Jesus Christ of Latter-day Saints Family Values Award (2014)
- WALGA Local Government Medal (2022, posthumous)

In 2002, Pickard became a Fellow of the Australian Marketing Institute.

In 2012, Pickard was one of 77 mayors nominated for the World Mayor Award.

== Legacy ==
Pickard was the longest continuously serving mayor, president or chairman since the Wanneroo Road Board (and its subsequent entities of the Shire of Wanneroo, City of Wanneroo and the City of Joondalup) was established in 1902.

In December 2022, the City of Joondalup council voted to rename the Warwick Hockey Centre to the Troy Pickard Hockey Centre.

In 2022, WALGA introduced the Troy Pickard Young Achievers Award. The award recognises those aged 35 years or younger who have made notable contributions to local government and demonstrated potential for professional success.

Pickard was inducted as an honorary life member (In Memoriam) of WALGA.
