= Western Australian Local Government Association =

- Abbreviation: WALGA
- Formation: 2001
- Headquarters: Perth
- Members: 139
- President: Cr Karen Chappel
- Website: https://walga.asn.au/

Western Australian Local Government Association (WALGA) is a non-profit organisation of local government bodies in Western Australia. It aims to represent and support the works and interests of Western Australian government sectors.

It commenced in 2001, as a successor to the Western Australian Municipal Association, Country Shire Councils' Association, and the Local Government Association. It has lobbied for increased funding for local government at different stages.

== Structure and Governance ==
Membership of WALGA

WALGA is an independent, member‑based organisation representing and supporting the local government sector in Western Australia. Its membership includes all 139 local governments in the state.

Governance Bodies (State Council, Zones, Delegates)

WALGA's governance structure includes a State Council that is the principal decision‑making body, chaired by the president and representing member councils through geographic zones.

Representative Structure

Zones group councils based on geographic alignment and population, with representatives elected to State Council to ensure all members’ interests are represented.

== Functions and Services ==
Advocacy and Policy

WALGA uses its influence and expertise to advocate to all levels of government on behalf of its members, helping deliver better outcomes for councils and their communities.

Expert Advice and Support

WALGA provides expertise and services that support local government operations, including advice on employee relations, governance, procurement, tax, and risk management through programs like the LGIS mutual indemnity scheme.

Training and Professional Development

The association offers a range of training courses and professional development opportunities designed for elected members and local government officers, helping them meet governance, planning, and operational needs.

Sector Services (Member Benefits)

Members have access to additional services such as the Preferred Supplier Program, subscription services, and shared resources through the Member Hub.

== Notable former presidents ==
Several WALGA presidents have played a significant role in shaping local government in Western Australia. Their leadership has guided policy, advocacy and sector reform initiatives. Notable former presidents include:

- Troy Pickard (2010–2015) – Played a prominent role in sector advocacy and oversaw attempted local government amalgamations, stepped down to serve as president of the Australian Local Government Association.
- Lynne Craigie (2015–2020) – First woman elected to the position
- Tracey Roberts (2020–2022) – Former mayor of the City of Wanneroo, stepped down when elected to Federal Parliament in the 2022 election.

== WALGA Awards ==
WALGA administers annual awards recognising innovation, service excellence, and community engagement among Western Australian local governments. Categories include sustainability, community initiatives, and governance.

WALGA's annual Local Government Awards / Honours Program includes the following categories:

- Local Government Medal – WALGA's highest honour, recognises exceptional service, outstanding achievements, and significant contributions to the local government sector.
- Life Membership – awarded for outstanding service and long‑term contributions to WALGA and the sector.
- Eminent Service Award – honours distinguished contribution to local government and WALGA.
- Merit Award – recognises notable contributions to the sector.
- Local Government Distinguished Officer Award – recognises outstanding contributions by local government officers.
- Troy Pickard Young Achievers Award – named in memory of former WALGA President Troy Pickard and awarded to individuals aged 35 or under for notable contributions and potential.

== See also ==
- Local government in Western Australia
- Local government in Australia
- Australian Local Government Association
