= List of shire presidents of Mundaring =

The Shire of Mundaring in Perth, Western Australia was originally established on 17 April 1903 as the Greenmount Road District with a chairman and councillors under the Roads Act 1888. It was renamed Mundaring on 29 March 1934, and with the passage of the Local Government Act 1960, all road districts became Shires with a shire president and councillors effective 1 July 1961.

== Chairmen ==
Mayor	Term
W. H. McGlew	1903–1906
T. Wilkins	1906–1907
C. Cook	1907–1908
B. Pittersen	1908–1909
E. B. Stephens	1909–1913
E. C. Brinkworth	1913–1917
W. H. Trott	1917–1921
W. W. Kirk	1921–1924
C. Y. Dean	1924–1926
Horace Elgar Mofflin	1926–1932
Arthur William Brown	1932–1935
Harry Quin Robinson^{[1]}	1935–1938
Frank Hubert Priestley^{[1]}	1938
Harry Ward	1938–1939
Harry Quin Robinson	1939–1955
Davison Clyde Dowdell	1955–1956
Albert Barnett Facey	1956–1957
Herbert Ernest Marnie	1957–1961

== Presidents ==
President	Term
Herbert Ernest Marnie	1961–1964
V. J. Murray	1964–1968
K. A. Pustkuchen	1968–1971
A. Moir	1971–1972
C. K. Moore	1972–1973
E. J. (Ted) Barbour	1973–1974
Tom Broz	1974–1976
Tom Herzfeld	1976–1977
Tom Broz	1977–1985
Russell Waugh	1985–1993
R. P. Dullard	1993–1997
John Ellery	1997–2001
Terry Geraghty	2001–2005
John Beaton	2005–2007
Helen Dullard	2007–2015
David Lavell	2015–2017
John Daw	2017–2021
James Martin	2021–present

== Notes ==
^{1} Harry Quin Robinson resigned prior to 10 March 1938 due to illness. Frank Hubert Priestley was elected by his colleagues to serve as chairman until after the April elections. Harry Ward was elected unopposed by the board on 12 May 1938 for the following term.
