= List of mayors of Wanneroo =

The City of Wanneroo in Perth, Western Australia was originally established on 31 October 1902 as a road board with a chairman and councillors under the Roads Boards Act 1871. With the passage of the Local Government Act 1960, all road boards became Shires with a shire president and councillors effective 1 July 1961. On 19 July 1985, Wanneroo attained City status, and the Shire president became a mayor.

The City was then split in 1998 with the southwestern section becoming the City of Joondalup and the remainder forming a reduced Shire of Wanneroo. It re-attained City status on 18 June 1999. As this was before the local government elections to elect a mayor and councillors, the second incarnation of the Shire did not have a president.

The current mayor of the City of Wanneroo is Linda Aitken, who was elected to the position in September 2022.

== Wanneroo Road Board ==
Chairman	Term
Herbert Hocking	1903–1911
James Spiers	1911–1915
Harold Edwards	1915–1917
Herbert Hocking	1917–1925
Denis Keane	1925–1928
John Perry	1928–1929
Denis Keane	1929–1935
Eli Edward Ashby	1935–1944
William Charles Pearsall	1944–1950
Vacant March 1950^{[1]}—June 1950
Gilbert Handcock	1950–1951; 1952–1953; 1953–1955
John Steele	1951–1952
Frederick Sexton	1953 (Jun–Sep)
Keith Porteous	1955–1956
Daniel Cooper	1956–1957
Vacant December 1957^{[2]}—April 1960
Neil Martin	April 1960 – June 1961

== Shire of Wanneroo ==
Shire president	Term
Neil Martin	1961–1962
Edwin Crisafullia	1962–1964
Joe Smith	1964–1965
John Gaynor	1965–1968
Mick Nanovich	1968–1974
Charles Searson	1974–1981
Mike O'Brien JP	1981–1982
Keith Pearce	1982–1983
Ray Ivan	1983–1984
Nick Trandos	1984–1985

== City of Wanneroo ==
Mayor	Term
Nick Trandos	1985–1986
Brian Cooper	1986–1988
Wayne Bradshaw	1988–1989
Brian Cooper	1989–1990
Wayne Bradshaw	1990–1991
Bill Duffy	1991
Bill Marwick	1991–1992
Rob Johnson	1992–1993
Graeme Major	1993–1994
Rita Waters	1994–1995
Arnold Dammers	1995–1997
Brian Cooper	1997
Vacant November 1997^{[3]}—December 1999
Jon Kelly	1999–2011
Tracey Roberts	2011–2022
Linda Aitken	2022–present

== Notes ==
- ^{1} On 10 March 1950, three councillors, W.G. Pearsall, W. J. Mowatt and E. Ashby, resigned. On 24 March 1950, an Order in Council was issued appointing a Commissioner, George Seddon Lindsay in his role as Secretary for Local Government, "until a new Board is duly elected". This election took place on 10 June 1950.
- ^{2} On 17 December 1957, an Order in Council was issued appointing a Commissioner, Richard Rushton. The reason given was that "owing to the resignation of members, there are not now sufficient members to form a quorum of the Board of the Wanneroo Road District."
- ^{3} On 12 November 1997, the council was suspended for a period not exceeding two years by the Minister for Local Government and five commissioners were appointed. It was reinstated on 1 July 1998, only for the City to be immediately abolished and placed under the same five commissioners.
