= Shane Grambeau =

Australian rules footballer

Personal information
- Full name: Shane Grambeau
- Born: 17 October 1952 (age 74)
- Original team: Sandringham Football Club (VFA)
- Position: Ruckman/Fullback

Playing career^{1}
Years	Club	Games (Goals)
1971–1975	St Kilda	51 (39)
1976–1979	Melbourne	60 (8)
Total		111 (47)
- ^{1} Playing statistics correct to the end of 1979.

Shane Grambeau (born 17 October 1952) is a former Australian rules footballer for the St Kilda Football Club and Melbourne Football Club in the Victorian Football League (VFL). Grambeau's father Mick played for North Melbourne.

== AFL career ==
Originally from Victorian Football Association (VFA) Sandringham, Grambeau began his VFL career at the St Kilda Football Club in 1971 where he was used as a Ruckman. He played there for five seasons, totaling 51 games for 39 goals. After struggling to hold down a permanent position, he requested to leave the Saints early in 1975 and joined the Melbourne Football Club in 1976 along with Allan Davis.

He played with Melbourne for four seasons between 1976 and 1979, where he was primarily used as a centre-half back and full back. He managed to play 60 games at the club, kicking eight goals.

== SANFL career ==
Grambeau joined South Australian National Football League (SANFL) club Woodville mid 1979 before transferring to fellow SANFL club West Torrens in 1980.

Grambeau moved back to Victoria later to play for Victorian Football Association (VFA) club Prahran.
