= Laurie Icke =

Australian rules footballer (1929–2010)

Personal information
- Born: 22 July 1929
- Died: 26 September 2010 (aged 81); Ballarat
- Original team: Ballarat East
- Height: 178 cm (5 ft 10 in)
- Weight: 81 kg (179 lb)

Playing career^{1}
Years	Club	Games (Goals)
1952–1955	North Melbourne	57 (0)
- ^{1} Playing statistics correct to the end of 1955.

Laurie Icke (22 July 1929 – 26 September 2010) was an Australian rules footballer who played with North Melbourne in the Victorian Football League (VFL).

Icke, a half back, started his career at Ballarat East, in the Ballarat Football League. In 1952 he was granted a permit to play for North Melbourne, after the VFL Permit Committee rejected a claim by Fitzroy that the defender had lived in Preston for 13 weeks, which would have tied him to the club, but Icke said it had only been six weeks.

He missed just one game in 1952 and played 15 of the first 16 rounds of the 1953 season, before suffering a thigh injury.

In 1954 he made 13 appearances, including North Melbourne's semi-final loss to Melbourne, which he played as a full-back. During the semi-final he was reporting for striking Ron Barassi and was suspended for the opening four rounds of the 1955 season.

Icke was welcomed back into the North Melbourne team in round six, but following their round 11 loss to a weak St Kilda side by seven points, was dismissed from the club, along with Mick Grambeau. The pair were notified of the committee's decision by mail, with no reason given.

The two players received support from their teammates, who held a club meeting on the Sunday where they unanimously agreed that the action of the committee was unconstitutional. Some of them had earlier considered pulling out of their game against Carlton that weekend, in protest. More than 2000 club supporters held a demonstration after the Carlton game, backing Icke and Grambeau.

On the next Tuesday, the two players appeared before the North Melbourne committee and were reinstated on the club's training list, after signing a statement which said that the "committee of the North Melbourne Football Club acted correctly in dispensing of our services" and expressed a desire to "withdraw and apologise for statements made by us to the press". The reason for Icke and Grambeau being sacked was not revealed to the public, but was believed to be because the committee felt that they had not tried hard enough in the St Kilda game. Icke went straight back into the North Melbourne team, which played Collingwood in round 13.

He played out the 1955 season, then in 1956 was cleared to Wimmera Football League club Minyip, as playing coach. Under Icke, Minyip made the 1956 Grand Final, which they lost to Ararat by 13 points.

His son, Steven Icke, was a member of North Melbourne's 1977 premiership team. He also played for Melbourne.
