= 1980 Western Australian state election =

- 23 February 1980

All 55 seats in the Western Australian Legislative Assembly and 16 (of the 32) seats to the Western Australian Legislative Council 28 Assembly seats were needed for a majority
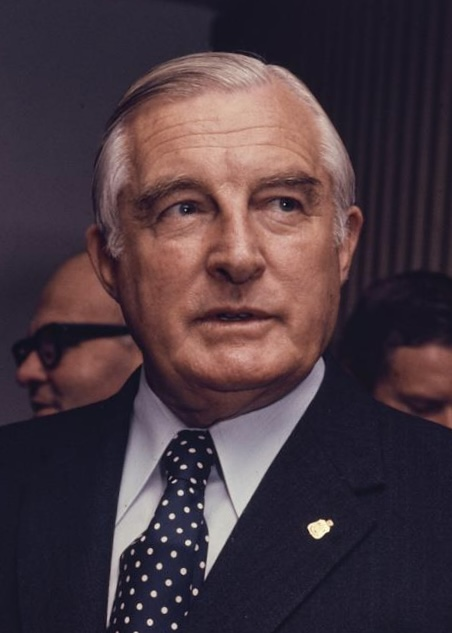
	First party	Second party	Third party
		ALP	NAT
Leader	Charles Court	Ron Davies	Hendy Cowan
Party	Liberal/NCP coalition	Labor	National
Leader since	5 June 1972	21 February 1978	1979
Leader's seat	Nedlands	Victoria Park	Merredin
Last election	30 seats	22 seats	3 seats
Seats won	29	23	3
Seat change	▼1	▲1	Steady
Popular vote	282,478	270,165	17,411
Percentage	48.05%	45.95%	2.96%
Swing	▼3.71	▲1.73	▲0.09
TPP	50.97%	49.03%
TPP swing	▼3.73	▲3.73
Premier before election
Charles Court
Liberal/NCP coalition
Elected Premier
Charles Court
Liberal/NCP coalition

Elections were held in the state of Western Australia on 23 February 1980 to elect all 55 members to the Legislative Assembly and 16 members to the 32-seat Legislative Council. The Liberal-National Country coalition government, led by Premier Sir Charles Court, won a third term in office against the Labor Party, led by Opposition Leader Ron Davies.

The election produced very little in terms of the balance of the parties in Parliament—Labor won Kimberley from the Liberals in the Assembly, and a North Province seat in the Council, but lost two Council seats to the Liberals—one each in North Metropolitan and South-East Metropolitan. However, Labor received a substantial swing overall, increasing majorities in seats it already held, and reducing Liberal majorities in western suburban seats and pushing the key seats of Bunbury and Pilbara into marginal status. Despite a vigorous campaign against each other, the National Country and National parties, which had split in August 1978, failed to gain any seats off each other, each retaining three seats in the Assembly, and the former retaining one in the Council.

== Results ==
=== Legislative Assembly ===
Western Australian state election, 23 February 1980 Legislative Assembly << 1977–1983 >>
Enrolled voters	689,066^{[1]}				
Votes cast	609,418		Turnout	85.27%	–5.51%
Informal votes	21,449		Informal	3.52%	+0.34%
Summary of votes by party
Party	Primary votes	%	Swing	Seats	Change
Liberal	257,218	43.75%	–5.60%	26	– 1
Labor	270,165	45.95%	+1.73%	23	+ 1
National Country^{[2]}	25,260	4.30%	+1.89%	3	± 0
National^{[2]}	17,411	2.96%	+0.09%	3	± 0
Democrats	11,513	1.96%	+1.96%	0	± 0
Socialist	1,527	0.26%	+0.26%	0	± 0
Progress	1,041	0.18%	–0.27%	0	± 0
Independent	3,834	0.65%	+0.05%	0	± 0
Total	587,969			55	
Two-party-preferred
Liberal/NCP	311,239	50.97%	–3.73%		
Labor	299,347	49.03%	+3.73%		

Notes:

^{1} 714,724 electors were enrolled to vote at the election, but two seats were uncontested: the seat of Collie, held by Labor's Tom Jones and representing 8,854 electors, and East Melville, won by the Liberals' Anthony Trethowan representing 16,804 electors, which was uncontested due to the Labor candidate's failure to submit their nomination on time.
^{2} The National Country Party contested seven seats in the 1977 election, winning six of them and attaining 5.28% of the vote. The National Party split from the National Country Party on 10 August 1978, with the former contesting 8 seats and the latter 11.

=== Legislative Council ===
Western Australian state election, 23 February 1980 Legislative Council
Enrolled voters	714,724				
Votes cast	631,915		Turnout	88.41%	–2.29%
Informal votes	27,692		Informal	4.38%	–0.03%
Summary of votes by party
Party	Primary votes	%	Swing	Seats won	Seats held
Liberal	287,058	47.51%	–2.80%	10	19
Labor	270,538	44.77%	+2.82%	5	9
National Country^{[1]}	23,101	3.82%	+0.65%	1	3
National^{[1]}	20,704	3.43%	+1.04%	0	1
Progress	2,822	0.47%	+0.47%	0	0
Independent	0	0.00%	–2.18%	0	0
Total	604,223			16	32
Two-party-preferred
Liberal/NCP	316,398	52.36%	–3.26%		
Labor	287,825	47.64%	+3.26%		

Notes:

^{1} The National Country Party contested four seats in the 1977 election, winning three of them and attaining 5.56% of the vote. The National Party split from the National Country Party on 10 August 1978, with the former contesting 5 seats and the latter 4.

== Seats changing hands ==
Seat	Pre-1980			Swing	Post-1980		
Seat	Party	Member	Margin	Swing	Margin	Member	Party
Kimberley	Liberal	Alan Ridge	1.3	-9.3	8.0	Ernie Bridge	Labor
Merredin	National Country	Hendy Cowan	N/A	N/A	23.5	Hendy Cowan	National
Mount Marshall	National Country	Ray McPharlin	N/A	N/A	10.8	Ray McPharlin	National
Stirling	National Country	Matt Stephens	N/A	N/A	11.4	Matt Stephens	National

== Post-election pendulum ==
Liberal/NCP seats (29)
Marginal
Bunbury	John Sibson	LIB	1.3%
Pilbara	Brian Sodeman	LIB	1.6%
Roe	Geoff Grewar	LIB	3.3%
Mundaring	Tom Herzfeld	LIB	3.5%
Murdoch	Barry MacKinnon	LIB	3.8%
Clontarf	Tony Williams	LIB	3.9%
Cottesloe	Bill Hassell	LIB	5.2%
Fairly safe
Scarborough	Ray Young	LIB	6.2%
Whitford	Mick Nanovich	LIB	8.3%
Karrinyup	Jim Clarko	LIB	8.5%
Murchison-Eyre	Peter Coyne	LIB	9.0%
Mount Lawley	Ray O'Connor	LIB	9.2%
Murray	Richard Shalders	LIB	9.2%
Wellington	June Craig	LIB	9.2%
Safe
Darling Range	George Spriggs	LIB	11.0%
Roe	Geoff Grewar	LIB	11.1% v NCP
Albany	Leon Watt	LIB	12.5%
Gascoyne	Ian Laurance	LIB	12.7%
South Perth	Bill Grayden	LIB	13.0%
Subiaco	Tom Dadour	LIB	13.9%
Kalamunda	Ian Thompson	LIB	14.4%
Floreat	Andrew Mensaros	LIB	19.4%
Nedlands	Charles Court	LIB	20.6%
Vasse	Barry Blaikie	LIB	21.7%
Moore	Bert Crane	NCP	23.1%
Narrogin	Peter Jones	NCP	27.0%
Katanning	Dick Old	NCP	29.3% v NAT
Greenough	Reg Tubby	LIB	29.4%
East Melville	Anthony Trethowan	LIB	unopp.

Labor seats (23)
Fairly safe
Avon	Ken McIver	ALP	6.7%
Gosnells	Bob Pearce	ALP	7.4%
Kimberley	Ernie Bridge	ALP	8.0%
Canning	Tom Bateman	ALP	8.5%
Welshpool	Colin Jamieson	ALP	9.4%
Swan	Jack Skidmore	ALP	9.6%
Mount Hawthorn	Ron Bertram	ALP	9.7%
Geraldton	Jeff Carr	ALP	9.8%
Safe
Maylands	John Harman	ALP	10.2%
Ascot	Mal Bryce	ALP	12.1%
Dianella	Keith Wilson	ALP	12.2%
Warren	David Evans	ALP	12.5%
Rockingham	Mike Barnett	ALP	13.4%
Kalgoorlie	Ian Taylor	ALP	14.5%
Morley	Arthur Tonkin	ALP	14.7%
Victoria Park	Ron Davies	ALP	14.7%
Melville	Barry Hodge	ALP	15.1%
Perth	Terry Burke	ALP	16.2%
Fremantle	David Parker	ALP	17.5%
Balcatta	Brian Burke	ALP	18.7%
Yilgarn-Dundas	Julian Grill	ALP	22.8%
Cockburn	Alexander Taylor	ALP	23.1%
Collie	Tom Jones	ALP	unopp.
National seats (3)
Mount Marshall	Ray McPharlin	NAT	10.8% v LIB
Stirling	Matt Stephens	NAT	11.4% v LIB
Merredin	Hendy Cowan	NAT	23.5% v LIB

== See also ==
- Members of the Western Australian Legislative Assembly, 1977–1980
- Members of the Western Australian Legislative Assembly, 1980–1983
- Candidates of the 1980 Western Australian state election
