= 1977 Western Australian state election =

- 19 February 1977

All 55 seats in the Western Australian Legislative Assembly and 17 (of the 32) seats to the Western Australian Legislative Council 28 Assembly seats were needed for a majority
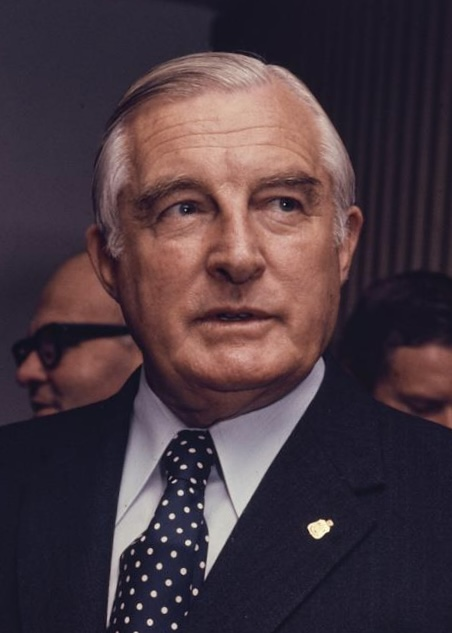

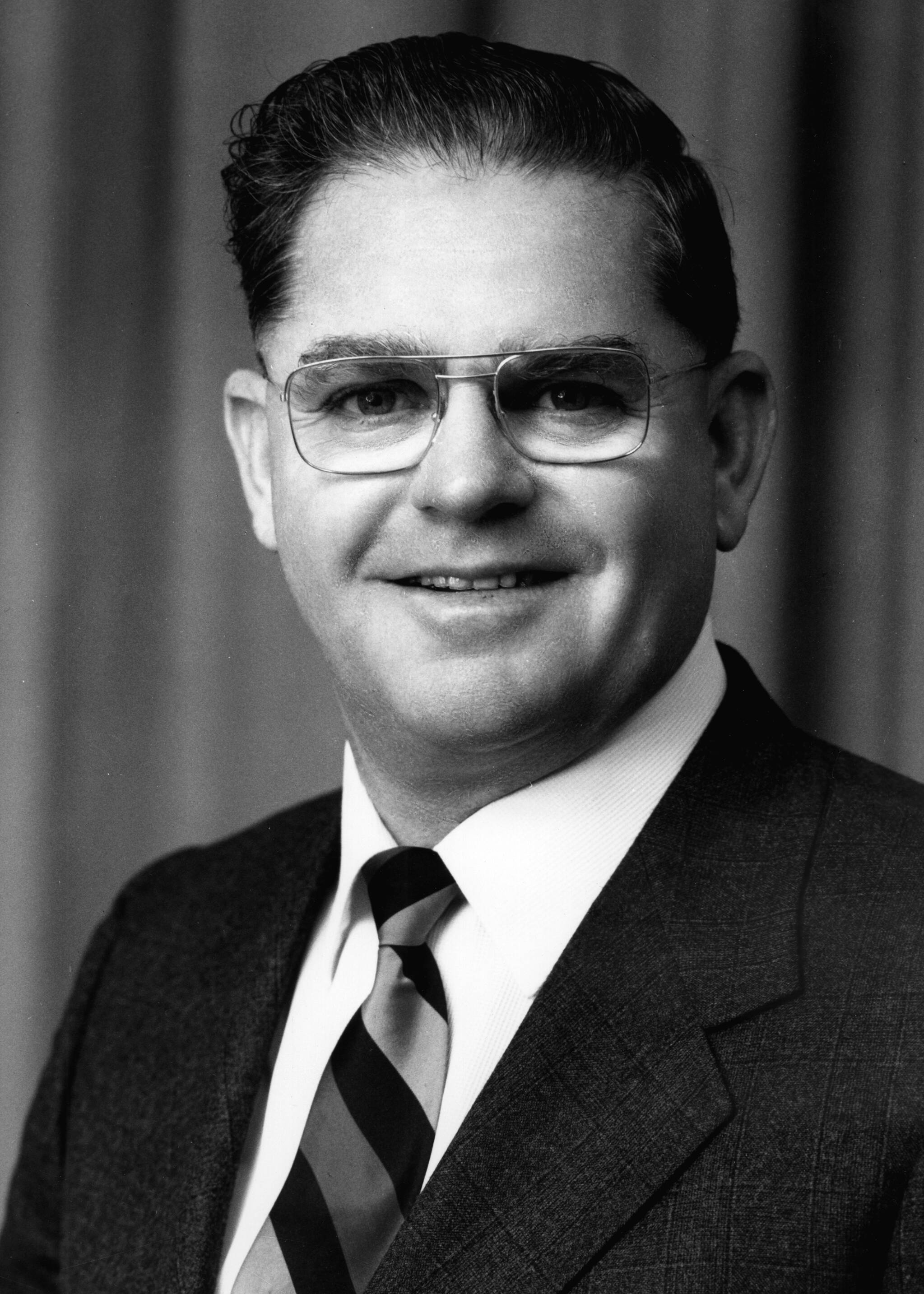
	First party	Second party
Leader	Charles Court	Colin Jamieson
Party	Liberal/NCP coalition	Labor
Leader since	5 June 1972	16 April 1976
Leader's seat	Nedlands	Welshpool
Last election	29 seats	22 seats
Seats won	33	22
Seat change	▲4	Steady
Popular vote	318,435	257,730
Percentage	54.70%	45.30%
Swing	▲3.50	▼3.88
TPP	54.70%	45.30%
TPP swing	▲4.53	▼4.53
Premier before election
Charles Court
Liberal/NCP coalition
Elected Premier
Charles Court
Liberal/NCP coalition

Elections were held in the state of Western Australia on 19 February 1977 to elect all 55 members to the Legislative Assembly and 17 members to the 32-seat Legislative Council. The Liberal-National Country coalition government, led by Premier Sir Charles Court, won a second term in office against the Labor Party, led by Opposition Leader Colin Jamieson.

The election produced a decisive victory for the Coalition, attributed by some observers to its strong and organised campaign, the Premier's ability in dealing with the media and good economic times built on resource exports, as contrasted against the Labor Opposition's often unfocussed campaign dwelling on the government's perceived autocratic methods and those sections of the general population which were not benefitting from the good times.

== Results ==
=== Legislative Assembly ===
Western Australian state election, 19 February 1977 Legislative Assembly << 1974–1980 >>
Enrolled voters	663,113				
Votes cast	601,975		Turnout	90.78%	+0.65%
Informal votes	19,148		Informal	3.18%	–0.90%
Summary of votes by party
Party	Primary votes	%	Swing	Seats	Change
Liberal	287,651	49.35%	+9.02%	27	+ 4
Labor	257,730	44.22%	–3.88%	22	± 0
National Country^{[1]}	30,784	5.28%	–5.52%	6	± 0
Progress	2,640	0.45%	+0.45%	0	± 0
Australia Party	549	0.09%	–0.31%	0	± 0
Independent	3,473	0.60%	+0.23%	0	± 0
Total	582,827			55	
Two-party-preferred
Liberal/NCP	318,796	54.70%	+4.53%		
Labor	264,031	45.30%	–4.53%		

Notes:

^{1} The National Country Party contested seven seats in the election. The previous high vote stemmed from its attempted merger with the Democratic Labor Party prior to the 1974 election, known as the "National Alliance", which contested 44 seats including many in the metropolitan area. The Alliance ceased to exist shortly after the 1974 election, and adopted a more traditional strategy in 1977.

=== Legislative Council ===
Western Australian state election, 19 February 1977 Legislative Council
Enrolled voters	663,113				
Votes cast	601,442		Turnout	90.70%	+0.76%
Informal votes	26,160		Informal	4.35%	–0.44%
Summary of votes by party
Party	Primary votes	%	Swing	Seats won	Seats held
Liberal	289,416	50.31%	+4.88%	9	18
Labor	241,359	41.95%	–5.28%	4	10
National Country	31,974	5.56%	–1.78%	3	4
Independent	12,533	2.18%	+2.18%	0	0
Total	575,282			16	32
Two-party-preferred
Liberal/NCP	319,952	55.62%	+3.72%		
Labor	255,330	44.38%	–3.72%		

== Seats changing hands ==
Seat	Pre-1977			Swing	Post-1977		
Seat	Party	Member	Margin	Swing	Margin	Member	Party
Clontarf	Labor	Don May	2.2	-9.8	7.6	Tony Williams	Liberal
Mundaring	Labor	James Moiler	1.6	-3.8	2.2	Tom Herzfeld	Liberal
Murdoch	Labor	Notional - new seat	8.6	-11.0	2.4	Barry MacKinnon	Liberal

- Members listed in italics did not recontest their seats.

=== Redistribution affected seats ===
Seat	1974 election			1976 redistribution			Swing	1977 election		
Seat	Party	Member	Margin	Party	Member	Margin	Swing	Margin	Member	Party
Murray	Liberal	Richard Shalders	1.8	Labor	Notional	1.0	+11.3	10.3	Richard Shalders	Liberal
Scarborough	Liberal	Ray Young	0.5	Labor	Notional	0.8	+7.4	6.6	Ray Young	Liberal

== Post-election pendulum ==
Liberal/NCP seats (33)
Marginal
Kimberley	Alan Ridge	LIB	1.3%
Mundaring	Tom Herzfeld	LIB	2.2%
Murdoch	Barry MacKinnon	LIB	2.4%
Pilbara	Brian Sodeman	LIB	2.8%
Bunbury	John Sibson	LIB	4.5%
Fairly safe
Scarborough	Ray Young	LIB	6.6%
Dale	Cyril Rushton	LIB	7.2%
Clontarf	Tony Williams	LIB	7.6%
Mount Lawley	Ray O'Connor	LIB	9.5%
Cottesloe	Bill Hassell	LIB	9.7%
Safe
Murray	Richard Shalders	LIB	10.3%
Karrinyup	Jim Clarko	LIB	11.0%
Wellington	June Craig	LIB	11.3%
Whitford	Mick Nanovich	LIB	12.4%
South Perth	Bill Grayden	LIB	12.8%
Albany	Leon Watt	LIB	12.9%
Moore	Bert Crane	NCP	13.3% v LIB
Murchison-Eyre	Peter Coyne	LIB	13.8%
Darling Range	George Spriggs	LIB	14.0%
Subiaco	Tom Dadour	LIB	14.1%
East Melville	Des O'Neil	LIB	15.5%
Kalamunda	Ian Thompson	LIB	18.6%
Mount Marshall	Ray McPharlin	NCP	19.8% v LIB
Stirling	Matt Stephens	NCP	21.3% v LIB
Gascoyne	Ian Laurance	LIB	21.6%
Vasse	Barry Blaikie	LIB	21.6%
Floreat	Andrew Mensaros	LIB	23.6%
Nedlands	Charles Court	LIB	24.0%
Stirling	Hendy Cowan	NCP	24.5%
Greenough	Reg Tubby	LIB	27.2%
Narrogin	Peter Jones	NCP	28.8% v LIB
Roe	Geoff Grewar	LIB	30.8%
Katanning	Dick Old	NCP	34.8%

Labor seats (22)
Marginal
Gosnells	Bob Pearce	ALP	0.9%
Canning	Tom Bateman	ALP	3.1%
Avon	Ken McIver	ALP	3.8%
Rockingham	Mike Barnett	ALP	4.0%
Dianella	Keith Wilson	ALP	4.3%
Maylands	John Harman	ALP	4.6%
Geraldton	Jeff Carr	ALP	5.6%
Warren	Hywel Evans	ALP	5.8%
Swan	Jack Skidmore	ALP	6.0%
Fairly safe
Welshpool	Colin Jamieson	ALP	6.2%
Mount Hawthorn	Ronald Bertram	ALP	7.5%
Morley	Arthur Tonkin	ALP	8.3%
Ascot	Mal Bryce	ALP	9.0%
Victoria Park	Ron Davies	ALP	9.6%
Perth	Terry Burke	ALP	9.7%
Melville	Barry Hodge	ALP	9.8%
Safe
Collie	Tom Jones	ALP	11.1%
Balcatta	Brian Burke	ALP	11.3%
Yilgarn-Dundas	Julian Grill	ALP	12.7%
Kalgoorlie	Tom Evans	ALP	13.6%
Fremantle	John Troy	ALP	14.3%
Cockburn	Don Taylor	ALP	17.5%

== See also ==
- Members of the Western Australian Legislative Assembly, 1974–1977
- Members of the Western Australian Legislative Assembly, 1977–1980
- Candidates of the 1977 Western Australian state election
