= Gavan Troy =

Australian politician

The Honourable Gavan Troy

Member of the Legislative Assembly of Western Australia
- In office 19 February 1983 – 4 February 1989
- Preceded by: Tom Herzfeld
- Succeeded by: None (abolished)
- Constituency: Mundaring
- In office 4 February 1989 – 6 February 1993
- Preceded by: None (new seat)
- Succeeded by: June van de Klashorst
- Constituency: Swan Hills

Personal details
- Born: 31 May 1940 (age 86) Subiaco, Western Australia
- Party: Labor
- Education: WAIT

Gavan John Troy (born 31 May 1940) is a former Australian politician who was a Labor Party member of the Legislative Assembly of Western Australia from 1983 to 1993. He served as a minister in the governments of Brian Burke, Peter Dowding, and Carmen Lawrence.

Troy grew up in Gingin and prior to entering politics was a manager at Telecom.

Troy was elected to the seat of Mundaring in 1983, winning his seat by 16 votes. He served until the electorate was abolished in 1989. From 1989 until 1993, he represented the electorate of Swan Hills.

Troy was one of three ministers sacked during a cabinet reshuffle in early 1991 and was the only one to stay in the parliamentary Labor Party.

In 2004 Troy was appointed to a two-year term as commissioner for the Shire of York.

Parliament of Western Australia
Preceded by Tom Herzfeld	Member for Mundaring; 1983–1989	Abolished
New creation	Member for Swan Hills; 1989–1993	Succeeded by June van de Klashorst
