= Anthony Trethowan =

Australian politician (1945–2015)

Antony Trethowan

Member of the Legislative Assembly of Western Australia
- In office 1 February 1980 – 8 February 1986
- Preceded by: Sir Des O'Neil
- Succeeded by: Richard Lewis
- Constituency: East Melville

Personal details
- Born: 19 December 1945 Subiaco, Western Australia
- Died: 6 May 2015 (aged 69) Booragoon, Western Australia
- Party: Liberal
- Education: University of Western Australia (B.A.), Murdoch University (B.D.)

Antony Markham Trethowan (19 December 1945 – 6 May 2015) was an Australian politician and Anglican minister who was a Liberal Party member of the Legislative Assembly of Western Australia from 1980 to 1986, representing the seat of East Melville.

== Early life ==
Trethowan was born in Perth, the son of Elizabeth Margerita (née de Bernales) and Henry Markham Trethowan. His maternal grandfather was Claude de Bernales, a mining entrepreneur of Basque descent. Trethowan attended Christ Church Grammar School and Hale School before going on to the University of Western Australia, where he studied for (but did not complete) a Bachelor of Communications degree. Prior to entering politics, he was an executive director of the Austmac group of companies, and also a pilot officer in the Air Force Reserve.

== Politics ==
Trethowan entered parliament at the 1980 state election, replacing Sir Des O'Neil (a former deputy premier). He was elected unopposed, as the Labor candidate failed to submit his nomination on time. At the 1983 state election, Trethowan won his seat with 53.6 percent of the first-preference vote, defeating candidates from the Labor Party (Carmen Lawrence, a future premier) and the Australian Democrats (Shirley de la Hunty, a former Olympic athlete). He was subsequently named Shadow Minister for Local Government, Planning and Consumer Affairs in the shadow cabinet of Bill Hassell. However, Trethowan chose not to contest the 1986 state election, retiring from politics. He was succeeded by another Liberal, Richard Lewis.

== Later life ==
After leaving parliament, Trethowan entered the Anglican ministry, serving as rector of various parishes in the Anglican Diocese of Perth, including in the Perth Hills and the Wheatbelt. He also returned to university, graduating with a Bachelor of Arts from the University of Western Australia and a Bachelor of Divinity from Murdoch University. Trethowan died in May 2015, aged 69. He had been married twice, firstly to Julie Webster in 1968, with whom he had three children. He divorced his first wife in 1986 and remarried in 1989 to Marie-Louise Collins, but was divorced again in 2001.

Parliament of Western Australia
Preceded by Sir Des O'Neil	Member for East Melville; 1980–1986	Succeeded by Richard Lewis
