= Monty House =

Australian politician

Montague Grant "Monty" House (born 16 August 1946) is a former Australian politician.

He was born in Perth, the son of politician Edward House, and was a farmer at Gnowangerup before entering politics. In 1986 he was elected to the Western Australian Legislative Assembly as the National Party member for Katanning-Roe. He became Deputy Leader of the party in 1988, a position he held until 2001. He was Minister for Primary Industry and Fisheries from 1993 to 2001, but he retired from politics in 2005.

Western Australian Legislative Assembly
Preceded by Dick Old	Member for Katanning-Roe; 1986–1989	Abolished
Preceded by Matt Stephens	Member for Stirling; 1989–2005	Succeeded by Terry Redman
