= Mick Grambeau =

Australian rules footballer (1930–2013)

Personal information
- Full name: Mick Grambeau
- Born: 1 January 1930
- Died: 21 May 2013 (aged 83)
- Original team: Sandringham
- Height: 188 cm (6 ft 2 in)
- Weight: 91 kg (201 lb)
- Position: Follower

Playing career^{1}
Years	Club	Games (Goals)
1952–55	North Melbourne	56 (53)
- ^{1} Playing statistics correct to the end of 1955.

Mick Grambeau (1 January 1930 – 21 May 2013) was a former Australian rules footballer who played with North Melbourne in the Victorian Football League (VFL).

Grambeau played for Sandringham Football Club in the Victorian Football Association (VFA) and was selected to represent the VFA at the 1950 Brisbane Carnival.

In 1955, following North Melbourne's round 11 loss to a weak St Kilda side by seven points, Grambeau and Laurie Icke were dismissed from the club. The pair were notified of the committee's decision by mail, with no reason given.

The two players received support from their teammates, who held a club meeting on the Sunday where they unanimously agreed that the action of the committee was unconstitutional. Some of them had earlier considered pulling out of their game against Carlton that weekend, in protest. More than 2000 club supporters held a demonstration after the Carlton game, backing Icke and Grambeau.

On the next Tuesday, the two players appeared before the North Melbourne committee and were reinstated on the club's training list, after signing a statement which said that the "committee of the North Melbourne Football Club acted correctly in dispensing of our services" and expressed a desire to "withdraw and apologise for statements made by us to the press". The reason for Icke and Grambeau being sacked was not revealed to the public, but was believed to be because the committee felt that they had not tried hard enough in the St Kilda game. Both players went straight back into the North Melbourne team, which played Collingwood in round 13.

He left North Melbourne in 1956 to play for Ganmain in New South Wales, after unsuccessfully attempting to be cleared to St Kilda.

His son Shane played for St Kilda and Melbourne in the 1970s before moving to play in the South Australian National Football League for Woodville and West Torrens.
