= Electoral district of Applecross =

Former electoral district in Perth, Western Australia

Applecross Western Australia—Legislative Assembly
- State: Western Australia
- Dates current: 1989–1996
- Namesake: Applecross

Applecross was an electoral district of the Legislative Assembly in the Australian state of Western Australia from 1989 to 1996.

The district was based in the inner southern suburbs of Perth. First contested at the 1989 state election, it was held for two terms by Liberal MP Richard Lewis, who had previously been member for East Melville. The district was abolished ahead of the 1996 state election.

== Members for Applecross ==
Member	Party	Term
Richard Lewis	Liberal	1989–1996
