= Progress Party (Australia) =

- Founded: 26 January 1975
- Dissolved: c. 1981
- Ideology: Right-libertarianism; Anti-communism
- Political position: Right-wing
- Colors: Orange

The Progress Party, initially known as the Workers Party, was a minor political party in Australia in the mid-to-late 1970s. It was formed on 26 January (Australia Day) 1975, as a free-market right-libertarian and anti-socialist party, by businessmen John Singleton and Sinclair Hill, in reaction to the economic policies of Labor prime minister Gough Whitlam. It operated and ran candidates in Western Australia, the Northern Territory, South Australia, Queensland and New South Wales, but it did not have a central federal structure. Its Western Australian affiliate, which advocated secession from the rest of Australia, did particularly well in the area surrounding Geraldton in the state's Mid West. However, the party failed to win seats at any level of government and had gone out of existence by 1981.

The party's first electoral contest was the Greenough state by-election, which took place following the retirement of former premier David Brand. The candidate, Geoffrey McNeil, surprised most observers by attaining 12.96% of valid votes cast (only 0.66% less than the Labor candidate). Buoyed by that success, the Workers' Party ran three House of Representatives and five Senate candidates in Western Australia at the 1975 federal election. Subsequently, the New South Wales party nominated candidates at 1976 by-elections in the seats of Pittwater and The Hills.

The party was renamed the Progress Party after objections to the name and constitution, and the Westralian Progress Party published its platform in 1977, ahead of the February state election, at which it contested the seats of Greenough (achieving 16.8% of the vote), Geraldton (5.1%), Kalgoorlie (6.4%), Mundaring (4.0%) and Yilgarn-Dundas (3.6%). At the August 1977 Northern Territory assembly elections, the party picked up a territory-wide vote of 9.8%.

On 13 October 1977, sitting Liberal MP Peter Richardson announced that he had defected to the Progress Party and would be its lead Senate candidate in Western Australia at the 1977 federal election. Another former Liberal MP, Wylie Gibbs, also joined the party, but he did not run for office. At the federal election, the Progress Party contested every Western Australian seat in the House of Representatives, but only managed to collect 2.83% of the statewide vote. Richardson was unsuccessful in his bid for the Senate, with the party polling just over 10,000 votes, or 1.7 percent of the state total.

The party went on to contest the 1980 Western Australian state election but achieved a significantly lower level of support. The party is believed to have disbanded after that, but academic Marian Sawer has credited it with attracting publicity for neoliberal, economic rationalist ideals.
