= Australian Local Government Association =

Australian intergovernmental organisation

- Abbreviation: ALGA
- Formation: 1947
- Type: Representative organisation
- Legal status: Company Limited by Guarantee
- Headquarters: Canberra
- Location: Australia
- Members: 7
- President: Councillor Linda Scott
- Website: https://alga.asn.au/

The Australian Local Government Association (ALGA) is the principal organisation representing all 537 Local Government councils in Australia, and acts as the independent interest body for Australian local mayors, councillors and local government employees. The association is the federation of local government associations in each state and territory.

== Constituent members ==
- Local Government NSW
- Local Government Association of Northern Territory
- Local Government Association of Queensland
- Local Government Association of South Australia
- Local Government Association of Tasmania
- Municipal Association of Victoria
- Western Australian Local Government Association

== Role ==
- Sustaining local roads, transport and other infrastructure between multiple council regions
- Improving natural and built environmental outcomes
- Enhancing regional equity and regional development
- Building capacity and sustainability in local communities
- Connecting member associations and the Local Government sector
- Engaging effectively in Australian Government processes

As one of Australia's three levels of government, local government is represented by ALGA's President to the National Federation Reform Council as of 29 May 2020. Prior to this council's creation, ALGA was a member of the Council of Australian Governments (COAG), which was disestablished on 29 May 2020. That peak government decision-making forum brought together the Prime Minister (representing the federal government), Premiers and chief ministers of states and territories, and the ALGA President, and was tasked with high-level management of matters of national importance.

ALGA was founded in 1947 and, in 1976, established a secretariat in Canberra reflecting growing links with the Australian Government and an awareness of local government's emerging national role. Its policies are determined by the ALGA Board, which consists of two representatives from each of the member associations.

ALGA's senior-most leadership team comprises the President and two Vice-Presidents, which is supported by the secretariat (managed by the Chief Executive).

== See also ==
- Local government in Australia
