= Richard Shalders =

Australian politician

Member of the Legislative Assembly of Western Australia
- In office 30 March 1974 – 19 February 1983
- Preceded by: Ewart Runciman
- Succeeded by: None (abolished)
- Constituency: Murray

Personal details
- Born: 14 March 1938 (age 88) Midland, Western Australia
- Party: Liberal

Richard Steele Shalders (born 14 March 1938) is a former Australian politician who was a Liberal Party member of the Legislative Assembly of Western Australia from 1974 to 1983, representing the seat of Murray. He served as a minister in the government of Ray O'Connor.

Shalders was born in Perth, and attended Midland High School before going on to Claremont Teachers College. He worked as a schoolteacher from 1959, initially at Manjimup Senior High School, and eventually became a primary school principal. A member of the Liberal Party from 1966, Shalders was elected to parliament at the 1971 state election, replacing the retiring Ewart Runciman as the member for Murray. He retained his seat at the 1974, 1977, and 1980 elections.

When Ray O'Connor replaced Sir Charles Court as premier in January 1982, Shalders was made an honorary minister in his new ministry. After a few months, he was made a substantive minister, taking over from Ray Young as Minister for Community Welfare, Minister for Housing, and Minister for Consumer Affairs. O'Connor's government was defeated at the 1983 state election. Shalders had attempted to transfer from Murray to the new seat of Mandurah, but lost to Labor's John Read. He was one of four ministers to lose their seats, along with June Craig, Bob Pike, and Ray Young. After leaving parliament, Shalders was involved with a variety of businesses in Mandurah, including a real estate company and a bakery.

Parliament of Western Australia
Preceded by Henry Runciman	Member for Murray; 1974–1983	Abolished
Political offices
Preceded by Ray Young	Minister for Community Welfare; 1982–1983	Succeeded by Keith Wilson
Preceded by Ray Young	Minister for Housing; 1982–1983	Succeeded by Keith Wilson
Preceded by Ray Young	Minister for Consumer Affairs; 1982–1983	Succeeded by Arthur Tonkin
