= Richard Lewis (Australian politician) =

Australian politician (1939–2019)

The Honourable Richard Lewis AM

Member of the Legislative Assembly of Western Australia
- In office 8 February 1986 – 4 February 1989
- Preceded by: Anthony Trethowan
- Succeeded by: None (abolished)
- Constituency: East Melville
- In office 4 February 1989 – 14 December 1996
- Preceded by: None (new creation)
- Succeeded by: None (abolished)
- Constituency: Applecross

Personal details
- Born: 4 September 1939 East Fremantle, Western Australia
- Died: 3 March 2019 (aged 79)
- Party: Liberal

Kennon Richard Lewis AM (4 September 1939 – 3 March 2019) was an Australian politician who was a Liberal Party member of the Legislative Assembly of Western Australia from 1986 to 1996, representing the seats of East Melville (1986 to 1989) and Applecross (1989 to 1996).

Born in East Fremantle, Lewis attended Fremantle Boys' School and Scotch College before going on to Perth Technical College, where he trained as a cartographer and surveyor. Prior to entering politics, he worked in various surveying and urban development roles, eventually becoming managing director of a consulting surveying firm. Lewis was a City of Melville councillor from 1970 to 1984, and was elected deputy mayor three times. He first stood for parliament at the 1986 state election, and was elected to represent East Melville with 59.99 percent of the first-preference vote, replacing the retiring member Anthony Trethowan. East Melville was abolished prior to the 1989 election, but Lewis easily won the new seat of Applecross, which he continued to represent until his retirement at the 1996 election (which he did not contest).

Lewis held multiple portfolios in the shadow cabinets of both Barry MacKinnon and Richard Court, and after the Liberal victory at the 1993 election was appointed Minister for Planning and Minister for Heritage in the Court–Cowan ministry. Following the resignation of Doug Shave later in 1993, he was also appointed Minister for Housing, although he was replaced by Kevin Prince after a few months. After leaving politics, Lewis was named chairman of the East Perth Redevelopment Authority (serving from 1997 to 2001), and was also a director of the Western Power Corporation (from 1998 to 2001).

Parliament of Western Australia
Preceded by Anthony Trethowan	Member for East Melville; 1986–1989	Abolished
New creation	Member for Applecross; 1989–1996	Abolished
Political offices
Preceded by David Smith	Minister for Planning; 1993–1997	Succeeded by Graham Kierath
Preceded by Jim McGinty	Minister for Heritage; 1993–1997	Succeeded by Graham Kierath
Preceded by Doug Shave	Minister for Housing; 1993–1994	Succeeded by Kevin Prince
