= Clayton Mitchell (Australian politician) =

Australian politician

Clayton Clealand Bickley Mitchell (11 December 1900 – 1 July 1988) was an Australian politician. He was the Country Party member for Stirling in the Western Australian Legislative Assembly from 1962 to 1971.
