= Mick Nanovich =

Australian politician

Member of the Legislative Assembly of Western Australia
- In office 30 March 1974 – 19 February 1977
- Preceded by: James Moiler
- Succeeded by: None (abolished)
- Constituency: Toodyay
- In office 19 February 1977 – 19 February 1983
- Preceded by: None (new creation)
- Succeeded by: Pam Beggs
- Constituency: Whitford

Personal details
- Born: 18 June 1931 Osborne Park, Western Australia, Australia
- Died: 20 December 2005 (aged 74) Wanneroo, Western Australia, Australia
- Party: Liberal

Michael Nanovich (18 June 1931 – 20 December 2005) was an Australian politician who was a Liberal Party member of the Legislative Assembly of Western Australia from 1974 to 1983, representing the seats of Toodyay and Whitford.

Nanovich was born in Perth, the son of Maria (née Stupin) and Kosta Nanovich. His mother was a Croatian (from Dalmatia). During his youth, Nanovich was a talented Australian rules footballer. He played mostly in the Western Australian Amateur Football Association (WAAFA), though during the 1952 WANFL season he played ten league matches for Subiaco, kicking four goals. Nanovich left school at the age of 15, to work as a vegetable grower like his father. He eventually came to own land in the Wanneroo area, and in 1963 was elected to the Shire of Wanneroo council. From 1968 to 1974, Nanovich was shire president.

Having joined the Liberal Party only the previous year, Nanovich stood for parliament at the 1974 state election, and won the seat of Toodyay. The sitting Labor member, James Moiler, had retired. Toodyay was abolished in a redistribution prior to the 1977 election, with Nanovich successfully transferring to the new seat of Whitford. He retained the seat at the 1980 election, and in 1982 was appointed government whip. A the 1983 election, Nanovich chose to contest the new seat of Joondalup. He was defeated by the Labor candidate, Jackie Watkins, as Labor won the election in a landslide. Nanovich recontested Joondalup at the 1986 election, but was again defeated, with Watkins increasing her margin.

== See also ==
- List of mayors of Wanneroo

Parliament of Western Australia
Preceded by James Moiler	Member for Toodyay; 1974–1977	Abolished
New creation	Member for Whitford; 1977–1983	Succeeded by Pam Beggs
