= Tom Herzfeld =

Australian politician (1936–2023)

Member of the Legislative Assembly of Western Australia
- In office 19 February 1977 – 19 February 1983
- Preceded by: James Moiler
- Succeeded by: Gavan Troy
- Constituency: Mundaring

Personal details
- Born: 29 January 1936 Berlin, Germany
- Died: 6 June 2023 (aged 87)
- Party: Liberal
- Education: University of Western Australia

Thomas Alexander Albert Herzfeld (29 January 1936 – 6 June 2023) was an Australian politician who was a Liberal member of the Legislative Assembly of Western Australia from 1977 to 1983, representing the seat of Mundaring.

Herzfeld was born in Berlin, Germany. His father was a banker, and he spent part of his childhood in Bangkok, Thailand, before arriving in Australia in 1948. After attending Guildford Grammar School, Herzfeld went on to the University of Western Australia, graduating with Bachelor of Engineering with Honours (BE(Hons)) and was accepted as an associate member of the Institution of Engineers Australia (MIE Aust). He initially worked as a civil engineer with the state government's Public Works Department in the Pilbara, Kimberley and Southwest of the State. Later he transferred to the private sector. He was the Consultant's representative on the construction of the East Perth rail terminal. From May 1975 to June 1977, Herzfeld served as a councillor for the Shire of Mundaring, including as shire president from May 1976. He was elected to parliament at the 1977 state election, defeating the sitting Labor member, James Moiler, and increased his majority at the 1980 election. However, at the 1983 state election, Herzfeld was defeated by Labor's Gavan Troy, who won by just 16 votes on the two-party-preferred vote. This result was challenged and eventually overturned in the Court of Disputed Returns, but Troy retained the seat at the resulting by-election. After leaving parliament, Herzfeld worked as a research officer for two Liberal Party leaders, Ray O'Connor and Bill Hassell, and also held various administrative positions in the party, including State Secretary, State Director and Campaign Director for State and Federal elections. Herzfeld died on 6 June 2023, at the age of 87.

== See also ==
- List of shire presidents of Mundaring

Parliament of Western Australia
Preceded by James Moiler	Member for Mundaring; 1977–1983	Succeeded by Gavan Troy
