= Electoral district of East Melville =

Former electoral district in Western Australia

East Melville Western Australia—Legislative Assembly
- State: Western Australia
- Dates current: 1962–1989
- Namesake: Melville

East Melville was an electoral district of the Legislative Assembly in the Australian state of Western Australia from 1962 to 1989.

The district was based in the inner southern suburbs of Perth. It was a safe Liberal Party seat.

== History ==
First contested at the 1962 state election, the seat's inaugural member was Des O'Neil of the Liberal Party, hitherto the member for Canning. He was succeeded at the 1980 state election by fellow Liberal Anthony Trethowan—he won unopposed, due to the failure of the ALP candidate to nominate on time, but was opposed by Dr Carmen Lawrence in 1983. Trethowan was succeeded by another Liberal in Richard Lewis at the 1986 state election.

East Melville was abolished ahead of the 1989 state election. Lewis went on to become the member for Applecross.

== Members for East Melville ==
Member	Party	Term
Des O'Neil	Liberal Country League	1962–1968
Des O'Neil	Liberal	1968–1980
Anthony Trethowan	Liberal	1980–1986
Richard Lewis	Liberal	1986–1989
