= Matt Stephens (politician) =

Australian politician

Matthew Ernest Stephens (4 April 1926 – 15 April 2017) was a Western Australian politician. He represented Stirling in the Western Australian Legislative Assembly for the Country Party (later the National Party) from 1971 to 1989. He was Minister for Conservation and Environment and Minister for Fisheries and Forestries from 1974 to 1975.

Parliament of Western Australia
Preceded by Clayton Mitchell	Member for Stirling; 1971–1989	Succeeded by Monty House
