= James Moiler =

Australian politician

James Moiler (9 June 1930 – 4 October 2012) was an Australian politician. He was a Labor member of the Western Australian Legislative Assembly, representing Toodyay from 1971 to 1974 and Mundaring from 1974 to 1977.
