= Ray Young (Australian politician) =

Australian politician

Raymond Laurence Young (7 September 1938 – 2 December 2000) was an Australian politician. He was a Liberal member of the Western Australian Legislative Assembly from 1971 to 1983.

Young represented the district of Wembley from 1971 to 1974 and the district of Scarborough from 1974 to 1983.
