= Electoral district of Stirling =

Former electoral district of Western Australia

Stirling Western Australia—Legislative Assembly
- State: Western Australia
- Dates current: 1950–2008
- Namesake: Stirling Range

Stirling was an electoral district of the Legislative Assembly in the Australian state of Western Australia from 1950 to 2008.

The district was located in the Great Southern region of Western Australia.

== Geography ==
Stirling was a rural district, surrounding but not including the coastal city of Albany. At its abolition it included the towns of Denmark, Mount Barker, Walpole and Cranbrook.

== History ==
Stirling was first created for the 1950 state election. It was held at all times by the National Party, or factions thereof, under their various guises.

The district was abolished ahead of the 2008 state election as a result of the reduction in rural seats made necessary by the one vote one value reforms. Its former territory was largely incorporated into the new district of Blackwood-Stirling with parts also added to Albany. Following Stirling's abolition, sitting National MP Terry Redman contested the seat of Blackwood-Stirling.

== Members for Stirling ==
Member	Party	Term
Arthur Watts	Country	1950–1962
Clayton Mitchell	Country	1962–1971
Matt Stephens	Country	1971–1975
Matt Stephens	National Country	1975–1978
Matt Stephens	National (NP)	1978–1985
Matt Stephens	National	1985–1989
Monty House	National	1989–2005
Terry Redman	National	2005–2008
