= Electoral district of Mundaring =

Former electoral district of Western Australia

Mundaring Western Australia—Legislative Assembly
- State: Western Australia
- Dates current: 1974–1989
- Namesake: Mundaring

Mundaring was an electoral district of the Legislative Assembly in the Australian state of Western Australia from 1974 to 1989.

The district was located east of Perth.

== History ==
First created for the 1974 state election, the district's first member was Labor's James Moiler, who had at that stage already served one term as the member for Toodyay. The district switched parties at the 1977 state election with the election of Liberal candidate Tom Herzfeld. Herzfeld served two terms in parliament before being defeated by 16 votes by Labor candidate Gavan Troy at the 1983 state election. The result was challenged in the Court of Disputed Returns and the election was declared void, but Troy won the resulting by-election by a larger margin, and went on to serve as a minister in the Burke, Dowding and Lawrence governments from 1986 until 1991.

Mundaring was abolished ahead of the 1989 state election and largely replaced by the new district of Swan Hills. Accordingly, Troy contested and won the new Swan Hills seat.

== Members ==
Member	Party	Term
James Moiler	Labor	1974–1977
Tom Herzfeld	Liberal	1977–1983
Gavan Troy	Labor	1983–1989
