= Electoral district of Yilgarn-Dundas =

Former electoral district in Western Australia

Yilgarn-Dundas Western Australia—Legislative Assembly
- State: Western Australia
- Dates current: 1977–1983
- Namesake: Yilgarn; Shire of Dundas

Yilgarn-Dundas was an electoral district of the Legislative Assembly in the Australian state of Western Australia from 1977 to 1983.

The district was located in the Goldfields-Esperance region, and was based in Boulder and took in some Kalgoorlie suburbs, while extending west to Coolgardie and Southern Cross, and south to Kambalda and Norseman.

It existed for two terms of parliament, and was represented in that time by Labor member Julian Grill. Following the abolition of Yilgarn-Dundas at the 1983 state election, Grill became the member for Esperance-Dundas.

== Members for Yilgarn-Dundas ==
Member	Party	Term
Julian Grill	Labor	1977–1983
