= Results of the 1933 Western Australian state election (Legislative Assembly) =

Western Australian state election, 8 April 1933 Legislative Assembly << 1930–1936 >>
Enrolled voters	205,312^{[1]}				
Votes cast	186,012		Turnout	90.60%	+16.15%
Informal votes	4,156		Informal	2.23%	+1.10%
Summary of votes by party
Party	Primary votes	%	Swing	Seats	Change
Labor	82,702	45.48%	+7.04%	30	+ 7
Nationalist	55,522	30.53%	–5.65%	8	– 7
Country	25,980	14.29%	–4.48%	11	– 1
Ind. Nat.	2,199	1.21%	+1.21%	0	± 0
Communist	442	0.25%	+0.25%	0	± 0
Independent	14,918	8.20%	–2.70%	1	+ 1
Total	186,012			50	

This is a list of electoral district results of the 1933 Western Australian election.

== Results by electoral district ==
=== Albany ===
1933 Western Australian state election: Albany
Party	Candidate	Votes	%	±%
Labor	Arthur Wansbrough	2,031	51.5	+4.8
Country	William Day	969	24.6	−0.2
Independent Country	George Cooper	804	20.4	+20.4
Country	Alfred Lawrence	142	3.6	+3.6
Total formal votes		3,946	98.8	+0.6
Informal votes		46	1.2	−0.6
Turnout		3,992	92.6	+17.6
Labor hold		Swing	N/A	

- Preferences were not distributed.

=== Avon ===
1933 Western Australian state election: Avon
Party	Candidate	Votes	%	±%
Labor	Fred Law	1,608	46.0	+9.2
Country	Harry Griffiths	1,453	41.6	−21.6
Country	John Mann	433	12.4	+12.4
Total formal votes		3,494	97.7	−1.5
Informal votes		83	2.3	+1.5
Turnout		3,577	91.8	+17.3
Two-party-preferred result
Country	Harry Griffiths	1,781	51.0	−12.2
Labor	Fred Law	1,713	49.0	+12.2
Country hold		Swing	−12.2	

=== Beverley ===
1933 Western Australian state election: Beverley
Party	Candidate	Votes	%	±%
Country	James Mann	2,164	63.3	+16.6
Country	Charles Wansbrough	1,257	36.7	−0.2
Total formal votes		3,421	98.5	+0.1
Informal votes		52	1.5	−0.1
Turnout		3,473	84.6	+19.0
Country hold		Swing	N/A	

=== Boulder ===
1933 Western Australian state election: Boulder
Party	Candidate	Votes	%	±%
Labor	Philip Collier	2,337	89.5	−10.5
Communist	Wilfred Mountjoy	274	10.5	+10.5
Total formal votes		2,611	96.7	
Informal votes		89	3.3	
Turnout		2,700	92.1	
Labor hold		Swing	N/A	

=== Brown Hill-Ivanhoe ===
1933 Western Australian state election: Brown Hill-Ivanhoe
Party	Candidate	Votes	%	±%
Labor	Frederick Smith	unopposed		
Labor hold		Swing		

=== Bunbury ===
1933 Western Australian state election: Bunbury
Party	Candidate	Votes	%	±%
Labor	Frederick Withers	2,422	55.4	+0.2
Nationalist	John Hands	1,954	44.6	−0.2
Total formal votes		4,376	99.0	+0.2
Informal votes		45	1.0	−0.2
Turnout		4,421	95.5	+8.2
Labor hold		Swing	+0.2	

=== Canning ===
1933 Western Australian state election: Canning
Party	Candidate	Votes	%	±%
Labor	Charles Cross	3,560	45.1	−4.1
Nationalist	Herbert Wells	1,782	22.5	−28.3
Nationalist	Henry Pilgrim	1,726	21.8	+21.8
Country	Leonard Perrin	834	10.6	+10.6
Total formal votes		7,902	96.7	−2.6
Informal votes		269	3.3	+2.6
Turnout		8,171	92.3	+19.3
Two-party-preferred result
Labor	Charles Cross	4,002	52.8	+3.6
Nationalist	Herbert Wells	3,578	47.2	−3.6
Labor gain from Nationalist		Swing	+3.6	

=== Claremont ===
1933 Western Australian state election: Claremont
Party	Candidate	Votes	%	±%
Nationalist	Charles North	2,448	42.5	−17.4
Nationalist	Donald Cleland	1,697	29.4	+29.4
Nationalist	Clarence Briggs	1,619	28.1	+28.1
Total formal votes		5,764	95.7	−3.5
Informal votes		258	4.3	+3.5
Turnout		6,022	91.6	+31.4
Two-candidate-preferred result
Nationalist	Charles North	3,071	53.3	
Nationalist	Donald Cleland	2,693	46.7	
Nationalist hold		Swing	N/A	

=== Collie ===
1933 Western Australian state election: Collie
Party	Candidate	Votes	%	±%
Labor	Arthur Wilson	2,732	69.3	−30.7
Independent Labor	Harry Stapledon	1,208	30.7	+30.7
Total formal votes		3,940	98.8	
Informal votes		46	1.2	
Turnout		3,986	90.0	
Labor hold		Swing	N/A	

=== East Perth ===
1933 Western Australian state election: East Perth
Party	Candidate	Votes	%	±%
Labor	James Kenneally	3,843	61.6	+1.5
Nationalist	William Murray	1,961	31.4	+31.4
Independent	Carlyle Ferguson	440	7.1	+7.1
Total formal votes		6,244	96.4	−2.2
Informal votes		232	3.6	+2.2
Turnout		6,476	87.7	+25.7
Labor hold		Swing	N/A	

- Preferences were not distributed.

=== Forrest ===
1933 Western Australian state election: Forrest
Party	Candidate	Votes	%	±%
Labor	May Holman	2,480	72.7	+6.9
Country	William Hollingsworth	933	27.3	+8.5
Total formal votes		3,281	96.3	−3.0
Informal votes		132	3.7	+3.0
Turnout		3,545	85.4	+9.4
Labor hold		Swing	N/A	

=== Fremantle ===
1933 Western Australian state election: Fremantle
Party	Candidate	Votes	%	±%
Labor	Joseph Sleeman	unopposed		
Labor hold		Swing		

=== Gascoyne ===
1933 Western Australian state election: Gascoyne
Party	Candidate	Votes	%	±%
Labor	Frank Wise	610	62.4	+17.7
Nationalist	Edward Angelo	368	37.6	−17.7
Total formal votes		969	99.1	−0.1
Informal votes		9	0.9	+0.1
Turnout		987	83.4	+0.9
Labor gain from Nationalist		Swing	+17.7	

=== Geraldton ===
1933 Western Australian state election: Geraldton
Party	Candidate	Votes	%	±%
Labor	John Willcock	unopposed		
Labor hold		Swing		

=== Greenough ===
1933 Western Australian state election: Greenough
Party	Candidate	Votes	%	±%
Labor	John Steele	1,844	38.1	0.0
Country	William Patrick	1,428	29.5	−5.1
Country	Kenneth Jones	965	19.9	+19.9
Independent Country	Paul McGuiness	599	12.4	+12.4
Total formal votes		4,836	98.4	−0.6
Informal votes		76	1.6	+0.6
Turnout		4,912	83.5	+15.2
Two-party-preferred result
Country	William Patrick	2,648	54.8	−0.2
Labor	John Steele	2,188	45.2	+0.2
Country hold		Swing	−0.2	

=== Guildford-Midland ===
1933 Western Australian state election: Guildford-Midland
Party	Candidate	Votes	%	±%
Labor	William Johnson	3,930	70.8	−29.2
Nationalist	Robert Crowther	1,624	29.2	+29.2
Total formal votes		5,554	98.2	
Informal votes		100	1.8	
Turnout		5,654	93.1	
Labor hold		Swing	N/A	

=== Hannans ===
1933 Western Australian state election: Hannans
Party	Candidate	Votes	%	±%
Labor	Selby Munsie	unopposed		
Labor hold		Swing		

=== Irwin-Moore ===
1933 Western Australian state election: Irwin-Moore
Party	Candidate	Votes	%	±%
Country	Percy Ferguson	1,590	54.1	−12.0
Nationalist	Edmund Nicholson	980	33.3	−0.5
Country	Corintin Honner	371	12.6	+12.6
Total formal votes		2,941	98.2	−0.5
Informal votes		54	1.8	+0.5
Turnout		2,995	85.8	+21.8
Country hold		Swing	N/A	

- Preferences were not distributed.

=== Kalgoorlie ===
1933 Western Australian state election: Kalgoorlie
Party	Candidate	Votes	%	±%
Labor	James Cunningham	1,937	65.2	−34.8
Nationalist	Ernest Williams	698	23.5	+23.5
Nationalist	Francis O'Dea	337	11.3	+11.3
Total formal votes		2,972	97.5	
Informal votes		77	2.5	
Turnout		3,049	89.4	
Labor hold		Swing	N/A	

- Preferences were not distributed.

=== Kanowna ===
1933 Western Australian state election: Kanowna
Party	Candidate	Votes	%	±%
Labor	Emil Nulsen	unopposed		
Labor hold		Swing		

=== Katanning ===
1933 Western Australian state election: Katanning
Party	Candidate	Votes	%	±%
Country	Arnold Piesse	2,260	47.7	−14.4
Labor	Martin Hartigan	1,415	29.9	+29.9
Country	Arthur Watts	609	12.9	+12.9
Country	John Nagel	453	9.6	+9.6
Total formal votes		4,737	97.6	−1.2
Informal votes		115	2.4	+1.2
Turnout		4,852	92.1	+11.5
After distribution of preferences
Country	Arnold Piesse	2,434	51.4	
Labor	Martin Hartigan	1,496	31.6	
Country	Arthur Watts	807	17.0	
Country hold		Swing	N/A	

- Preferences were not distributed to completion.

=== Kimberley ===
1933 Western Australian state election: Kimberley
Party	Candidate	Votes	%	±%
Labor	Aubrey Coverley	369	52.3	−21.2
Nationalist	Arthur Povah	337	47.7	+21.2
Total formal votes		706	98.3	−0.4
Informal votes		12	1.7	+0.4
Turnout		718	78.6	+18.0
Labor hold		Swing	−21.2	

=== Leederville ===
1933 Western Australian state election: Leederville
Party	Candidate	Votes	%	±%
Labor	Alexander Panton	4,846	58.4	+10.0
Nationalist	Henry Simper	1,791	21.6	+5.8
Nationalist	Ernest Caddy	1,660	20.0	+20.0
Total formal votes		8,297	97.7	−1.0
Informal votes		196	2.3	+1.0
Turnout		8,493	93.7	+21.9
Labor hold		Swing	N/A	

- Preferences were not distributed.

=== Maylands ===
1933 Western Australian state election: Maylands
Party	Candidate	Votes	%	±%
Labor	Robert Clothier	2,721	42.8	+1.1
Nationalist	John Scaddan	1,652	26.0	−5.7
Nationalist	Arthur Daley	1,203	18.9	−5.0
Nationalist	Charles Plunkett	675	10.6	+10.6
Independent	Frederick Swaine	106	1.7	+1.7
Total formal votes		6,357	98.1	−0.8
Informal votes		123	1.9	+0.8
Turnout		6,480	91.2	+11.9
Two-party-preferred result
Labor	Robert Clothier	3,505	55.1	+9.4
Nationalist	John Scaddan	2,852	44.9	−9.4
Labor gain from Nationalist		Swing	+9.4	

=== Middle Swan ===
1933 Western Australian state election: Middle Swan
Party	Candidate	Votes	%	±%
Labor	James Hegney	4,081	59.4	+11.9
Nationalist	Karl Drake-Brockman	1,286	18.7	−3.9
Nationalist	William Southwood	658	9.6	+9.6
Nationalist	John Pickering	599	8.7	+8.7
Country	George Gaunt	244	3.5	−9.9
Total formal votes		6,868	96.3	−1.9
Informal votes		265	3.7	+1.9
Turnout		7,133	90.3	+19.9
Labor hold		Swing	N/A	

- Preferences were not distributed.

=== Mount Hawthorn ===
1933 Western Australian state election: Mount Hawthorn
Party	Candidate	Votes	%	±%
Labor	Harry Millington	3,512	62.5	+9.0
Nationalist	Hugh Henderson	2,107	37.5	−9.0
Total formal votes		5,619	97.9	−0.8
Informal votes		123	2.1	+0.8
Turnout		5,742	94.3	+17.0
Labor hold		Swing	+9.0	

=== Mount Magnet ===
1933 Western Australian state election: Mount Magnet
Party	Candidate	Votes	%	±%
Labor	Michael Troy	unopposed		
Labor hold		Swing		

=== Mount Marshall ===
1933 Western Australian state election: Mount Marshall
Party	Candidate	Votes	%	±%
Independent Country	Frederick Warner	2,030	54.8	+54.8
Country	John Lindsay	1,673	45.2	−26.8
Total formal votes		3,703	99.0	−0.3
Informal votes		37	1.0	+0.3
Turnout		3,740	85.2	+17.9
Independent Country gain from Country		Swing	N/A	

=== Murchison ===
1933 Western Australian state election: Murchison
Party	Candidate	Votes	%	±%
Labor	William Marshall	1,483	86.9	−13.1
Independent Labor	Donald Dunjey	224	13.1	+13.1
Total formal votes		1,707	96.1	
Informal votes		69	3.9	
Turnout		1,776	69.6	
Labor hold		Swing		

=== Murray-Wellington ===
1933 Western Australian state election: Murray-Wellington
Party	Candidate	Votes	%	±%
Nationalist	Ross McLarty	unopposed		
Nationalist hold		Swing		

=== Nedlands ===
1933 Western Australian state election: Nedlands
Party	Candidate	Votes	%	±%
Nationalist	Norbert Keenan	4,234	55.1	+32.1
Labor	Frank Darcey	3,445	44.9	+8.6
Total formal votes		7,679	98.7	+0.6
Informal votes		98	1.3	−0.6
Turnout		7,777	91.9	+9.5
Nationalist hold		Swing	+0.8	

=== Nelson ===
1933 Western Australian state election: Nelson
Party	Candidate	Votes	%	±%
Nationalist	John Smith	1,814	38.8	−27.9
Labor	Walter Toyer	1,748	37.4	+4.1
Country	William Huggett	569	12.2	+12.2
Country	Frederick Knapp	549	11.7	+11.7
Total formal votes		4,680	97.6	−1.5
Informal votes		115	2.4	+1.5
Turnout		4,795	89.0	+7.3
Two-party-preferred result
Nationalist	John Smith	2,607	55.7	−11.0
Labor	Walter Toyer	2,073	44.3	+11.0
Nationalist hold		Swing	−11.0	

=== North Perth ===
1933 Western Australian state election: North Perth
Party	Candidate	Votes	%	±%
Nationalist	James Smith	3,324	62.3	−0.7
Single Tax League	Edward White	2,007	37.7	+37.7
Total formal votes		5,331	97.8	−1.0
Informal votes		119	2.2	+1.0
Turnout		5,450	92.2	+23.8
Nationalist hold		Swing	N/A	

=== North-East Fremantle ===
1933 Western Australian state election: North-East Fremantle
Party	Candidate	Votes	%	±%
Labor	John Tonkin	3,730	59.9	+10.0
Nationalist	Hubert Parker	2,495	40.1	−10.0
Total formal votes		6,225	99.2	0.0
Informal votes		47	0.8	0.0
Turnout		6,272	95.5	+26.6
Labor gain from Nationalist		Swing	+10.0	

=== Northam ===
1933 Western Australian state election: Northam
Party	Candidate	Votes	%	±%
Labor	Albert Hawke	2,369	55.4	+8.8
Nationalist	James Mitchell	1,575	36.8	−16.6
Country	Thomas Peterson	334	7.8	+7.8
Total formal votes		4,278	98.8	−0.4
Informal votes		52	1.2	+0.4
Turnout		4,330	95.3	+14.3
Labor gain from Nationalist		Swing	N/A	

- Preferences were not distributed.

=== Perth ===
1933 Western Australian state election: Perth
Party	Candidate	Votes	%	±%
Labor	Ted Needham	3,734	58.4	+12.3
Nationalist	Harry Mann	2,661	41.6	−11.5
Total formal votes		6,395	97.7	−0.8
Informal votes		149	2.3	+0.8
Turnout		6,544	89.1	+16.6
Labor gain from Nationalist		Swing	N/A	

=== Pilbara ===
1933 Western Australian state election: Pilbara
Party	Candidate	Votes	%	±%
Nationalist	Frank Welsh	268	57.9	+18.6
Labor	James McGuire	195	42.1	−12.2
Total formal votes		445	96.3	−3.0
Informal votes		18	3.7	+3.0
Turnout		481	87.6	+3.4
Nationalist gain from Labor		Swing	N/A	

=== Pingelly ===
1933 Western Australian state election: Pingelly
Party	Candidate	Votes	%	±%
Country	Harrie Seward	1,510	44.8	+6.3
Independent	Cecil Elsegood	1,115	33.1	+33.1
Labor	Keith Growden	745	22.1	−0.7
Total formal votes		3,370	98.4	+0.7
Informal votes		54	1.6	−0.7
Turnout		3,424	85.4	+11.6
Two-candidate-preferred result
Country	Harrie Seward	1,738	51.6	+3.3
Independent	Cecil Elsegood	1,632	48.4	+48.4
Country hold		Swing	N/A	

=== Roebourne ===
1933 Western Australian state election: Roebourne
Party	Candidate	Votes	%	±%
Labor	Alec Rodoreda	261	52.3	+22.4
Nationalist	John Church	238	47.7	−22.4
Total formal votes		499	98.6	−1.0
Informal votes		7	1.4	+1.0
Turnout		506	86.4	+12.2
Labor gain from Nationalist		Swing	+22.4	

=== South Fremantle ===
1933 Western Australian state election: South Fremantle
Party	Candidate	Votes	%	±%
Labor	Alick McCallum	5,384	78.5	−21.5
Ind. Nationalist	Joshua Warner	1,305	19.0	+19.0
Communist	Gregory Collins	168	2.5	+2.5
Total formal votes		6,857	96.8	
Informal votes		224	3.2	
Turnout		7,081	94.7	
Labor hold		Swing	N/A	

- Preferences were not distributed.

=== Subiaco ===
1933 Western Australian state election: Subiaco
Party	Candidate	Votes	%	±%
Labor	John Moloney	2,873	43.6	+2.1
Nationalist	Walter Richardson	2,453	37.2	−21.3
Independent	John Bathgate	1,269	19.2	+19.2
Total formal votes		6,595	97.6	−1.4
Informal votes		164	2.4	+1.4
Turnout		6,759	92.9	+14.4
Two-party-preferred result
Labor	John Moloney	3,463	52.5	+11.0
Nationalist	Walter Richardson	3,132	47.5	−11.0
Labor gain from Nationalist		Swing	+11.0	

=== Sussex ===
1933 Western Australian state election: Sussex
Party	Candidate	Votes	%	±%
Labor	Herbert Swinbourne	1,364	36.2	+1.3
Nationalist	Edmund Brockman	946	25.1	+25.1
Nationalist	George Barnard	865	23.0	−18.3
Independent	Robert Falkingham	591	15.7	+15.7
Total formal votes		3,766	98.2	−0.9
Informal votes		70	1.8	+0.9
Turnout		3,836	94.9	+5.2
Two-party-preferred result
Nationalist	Edmund Brockman	2,033	54.0	−7.6
Labor	Herbert Swinbourne	1,733	46.0	+7.6
Nationalist hold		Swing	−7.6	

=== Swan ===
1933 Western Australian state election: Swan
Party	Candidate	Votes	%	±%
Country	Richard Sampson	2,731	65.8	−34.2
Nationalist	William Orr	1,421	34.2	+34.2
Total formal votes		4,051	97.6	
Informal votes		101	2.4	
Turnout		4,253	89.3	
Country gain from Nationalist		Swing	N/A	

- Richard Sampson was the sitting member for Swan that changed from the Nationalist to the Country party for this election.

=== Toodyay ===
1933 Western Australian state election: Toodyay
Party	Candidate	Votes	%	±%
Country	Lindsay Thorn	unopposed		
Country hold		Swing		

=== Victoria Park ===
1933 Western Australian state election: Victoria Park
Party	Candidate	Votes	%	±%
Labor	Howard Raphael	4,700	69.6	+21.2
Nationalist	Charles Harper	1,354	20.0	−11.6
Nationalist	Oliver Strang	700	10.4	+10.4
Total formal votes		6,754	97.4	−1.5
Informal votes		181	2.6	+1.5
Turnout		6,935	92.9	+11.0
Labor hold		Swing	N/A	

- Preferences were not distributed.

=== Wagin ===
1933 Western Australian state election: Wagin
Party	Candidate	Votes	%	±%
Country	Sydney Stubbs	unopposed		
Country hold		Swing		

=== West Perth ===
1933 Western Australian state election: West Perth
Party	Candidate	Votes	%	±%
Labor	John Blair	2,738	45.8	+1.7
Nationalist	Robert McDonald	2,349	39.3	−16.6
Ind. Nationalist	Leonard Goold	549	9.2	+9.2
Ind. Nationalist	Frank Cato	345	5.8	+5.8
Total formal votes		5,981	98.1	−1.0
Informal votes		117	1.9	+1.0
Turnout		6,098	91.1	+13.0
Two-party-preferred result
Nationalist	Robert McDonald	3,041	50.8	−5.1
Labor	John Blair	2,940	49.2	+5.1
Nationalist hold		Swing	−5.1	

=== Williams-Narrogin ===
1933 Western Australian state election: Williams-Narrogin
Party	Candidate	Votes	%	±%
Country	Victor Doney	1,968	67.7	−2.7
Independent	Arthur McCormick	941	32.3	+2.3
Total formal votes		2,909	98.5	−1.0
Informal votes		45	1.5	+1.0
Turnout		2,954	89.0	+7.8
Country hold		Swing	N/A	

=== Yilgarn-Coolgardie ===
1933 Western Australian state election: Yilgarn-Coolgardie
Party	Candidate	Votes	%	±%
Labor	George Lambert	1,742	61.9	+31.3
Independent Country	Jim Keightly	1,072	38.1	+38.1
Total formal votes		2,814	97.6	−1.4
Informal votes		69	2.4	+1.4
Turnout		2,883	87.7	+8.3
Labor hold		Swing	N/A	

=== York ===
1933 Western Australian state election: York
Party	Candidate	Votes	%	±%
Country	Charles Latham	1,605	59.4	−40.6
Independent Country	Donald Sutherland	555	20.5	+20.5
Independent	Charles Foreman	542	20.1	+20.1
Total formal votes		2,702	98.6	
Informal votes		38	1.4	
Turnout		2,740	90.6	
Country hold		Swing	N/A	

- Preferences were not distributed.

== See also ==
- Candidates of the 1933 Western Australian state election
- 1933 Western Australian state election
- Members of the Western Australian Legislative Assembly, 1933–1936
