= Electoral results for the district of Katanning =

Western Australian district election results

This is a list of electoral results for the Electoral district of Katanning in Western Australian state elections.

== Members for Katanning ==
Katanning (1904–1983)
Member	Party	Term
Frederick Piesse	Independent	1904–1905
Frederick Piesse	Ministerial	1905–1909
Arnold Piesse	Ministerial	1909–1911
Arnold Piesse	Liberal	1911–1914
Alec Thomson	Liberal	1914–1917
Alec Thomson	Country	1917–1923
Alec Thomson	Country (ECP)	1923–1924
Alec Thomson	Country	1924–1930
Arnold Piesse	Ind. Country	1930–1933
Arnold Piesse	Country	1933–1935
Arthur Watts	Country	1935–1950
Crawford Nalder	Country	1950–1974
Dick Old	National Country	1974–1983
Katanning-Roe (1983–1989)
Member	Party	Term
Dick Old	National Country	1983–1985
Dick Old	Liberal	1985–1986
Monty House	National	1986–1989

== Election results ==
=== Elections in the 1980s ===
1986 Western Australian state election: Katanning-Roe
Party	Candidate	Votes	%	±%
National	Monty House	4,179	47.4	−34.7
Liberal	Dick Old	3,196	36.3	+36.3
Labor	Jonathan Davies	1,438	16.3	−1.6
Total formal votes		8,813	98.6	+0.9
Informal votes		127	1.4	−0.9
Turnout		8,940	93.5	+4.0
Two-candidate-preferred result
National	Monty House	5,389	61.2	−20.9
Liberal	Dick Old	3,424	38.8	+38.8
National hold		Swing	−20.9	

1983 Western Australian state election: Katanning-Roe
Party	Candidate	Votes	%	±%
National Country	Dick Old	6,541	82.1	
Labor	Marilyn Elson	1,423	17.9	
Total formal votes		7,984	97.7	
Informal votes		184	2.3	
Turnout		8,148	89.5	
National Country hold		Swing		

1980 Western Australian state election: Katanning
Party	Candidate	Votes	%	±%
National Country	Dick Old	5,501	79.3	+6.4
National	Arnold Bilney	1,433	20.7	+20.7
Total formal votes		6,934	97.4	−0.4
Informal votes		187	2.6	+0.4
Turnout		7,121	91.8	−2.6
National Country hold		Swing	N/A	

=== Elections in the 1970s ===
1977 Western Australian state election: Katanning
Party	Candidate	Votes	%	±%
National Country	Dick Old	5,122	72.9	
Labor	Christopher Bothams	976	13.9	
Liberal	Peter Hatherly	931	13.2	
Total formal votes		7,029	97.8	
Informal votes		155	2.2	
Turnout		7,184	94.4	
Two-party-preferred result
National Country	Dick Old	5,960	84.8	+6.2
Labor	Christopher Bothams	1,069	15.2	−6.2
National Country hold		Swing	+6.2	

1974 Western Australian state election: Katanning
Party	Candidate	Votes	%	±%
National Alliance	Dick Old	4,307	63.2	
Labor	Kenneth Gawn	1,333	19.6	
Liberal	Peter Hatherly	1,174	17.2	
Total formal votes		6,814	97.1	
Informal votes		203	2.9	
Turnout		7,017	91.7	
Two-party-preferred result
National Alliance	Dick Old	5,364	78.7	
Labor	Kenneth Gawn	1,450	21.3	
National Alliance hold		Swing		

1971 Western Australian state election: Katanning
Party	Candidate	Votes	%	±%
Country	Crawford Nalder	1,951	35.4	−64.6
Labor	Ray Francisco	1,520	27.6	+27.6
Independent Country	Lloyd Nelson	1,147	20.8	+20.8
Democratic Labor	John Carr	377	6.8	+6.8
United Farmers	Hugh Carmichael-Smith	329	6.0	+6.0
Independent	William Stretch	189	3.4	+3.4
Total formal votes		5,513	94.0	
Informal votes		353	6.0	
Turnout		5,866	94.2	
Two-party-preferred result
Country	Crawford Nalder	3,400	61.7	−38.3
Labor	Ray Francisco	2,113	38.3	+38.3
Country hold		Swing	N/A	

=== Elections in the 1960s ===
1968 Western Australian state election: Katanning
Party	Candidate	Votes	%	±%
Country	Crawford Nalder	unopposed		
Country hold		Swing		

1965 Western Australian state election: Katanning
Party	Candidate	Votes	%	±%
Country	Crawford Nalder	unopposed		
Country hold		Swing		

1962 Western Australian state election: Katanning
Party	Candidate	Votes	%	±%
Country	Crawford Nalder	unopposed		
Country hold		Swing		

=== Elections in the 1950s ===
1959 Western Australian state election: Katanning
Party	Candidate	Votes	%	±%
Country	Crawford Nalder	unopposed		
Country hold		Swing		

1956 Western Australian state election: Katanning
Party	Candidate	Votes	%	±%
Country	Crawford Nalder	unopposed		
Country hold		Swing		

1953 Western Australian state election: Katanning
Party	Candidate	Votes	%	±%
Country	Crawford Nalder	unopposed		
Country hold		Swing		

1950 Western Australian state election: Katanning
Party	Candidate	Votes	%	±%
Country	Crawford Nalder	2,957	73.9	
Country	Wilhelm Beeck	1,042	26.1	
Total formal votes		3,999	97.7	
Informal votes		93	2.3	
Turnout		4,092	91.7	
Country hold		Swing		

=== Elections in the 1940s ===
1947 Western Australian state election: Katanning
Party	Candidate	Votes	%	±%
Country	Arthur Watts	3,682	78.3	+6.2
Labor	John Powell	1,018	21.7	+21.7
Total formal votes		4,700	98.7	+0.3
Informal votes		62	1.3	−0.3
Turnout		4,762	89.8	+4.9
Country hold		Swing	N/A	

1943 Western Australian state election: Katanning
Party	Candidate	Votes	%	±%
Country	Arthur Watts	3,165	72.1	+2.6
Independent Labor	Clayton Mitchell	1,227	27.9	+27.9
Total formal votes		4,392	98.4	+0.1
Informal votes		72	1.6	−0.1
Turnout		4,464	84.9	−6.6
Country hold		Swing	N/A	

=== Elections in the 1930s ===
1939 Western Australian state election: Katanning
Party	Candidate	Votes	%	±%
Country	Arthur Watts	3,259	69.5	+16.2
Independent	Walter Bird	1,433	30.5	+30.5
Total formal votes		4,692	98.3	−0.6
Informal votes		79	1.7	+0.6
Turnout		4,771	91.5	+17.1
Country hold		Swing	N/A	

1936 Western Australian state election: Katanning
Party	Candidate	Votes	%	±%
Country	Arthur Watts	1,970	53.3	+40.4
Independent Country	Nelson Lemmon	1,726	46.7	+46.7
Total formal votes		3,696	98.9	+1.3
Informal votes		42	1.1	−1.3
Turnout		3,738	74.4	−17.7
Country hold		Swing	N/A	

1935 Katanning state by-election
Party	Candidate	Votes	%	±%
Country	Arthur Watts	839	24.89	+9.33
Independent Country	Frederick Cox	674	19.99	+19.99
Independent Country	Nelson Lemmon	580	17.21	+17.21
Country	John McDonald	578	17.15	+17.15
Independent	Martin Hartigan	441	13.08	–15.77
Country	Samuel Kemble	259	6.80	+6.80
Total formal votes		3,300	97.89	n/a
Informal votes		71	2.11	n/a
Turnout		3,371	67.53	n/a
Two-candidate-preferred result
Country	Arthur Watts	1,707	50.64	n/a
Independent Country	Nelson Lemmon	1,664	49.36	n/a
Country hold		Swing	n/a^{[a]}	

1933 Western Australian state election: Katanning
Party	Candidate	Votes	%	±%
Country	Arnold Piesse	2,260	47.7	−14.4
Labor	Martin Hartigan	1,415	29.9	+29.9
Country	Arthur Watts	609	12.9	+12.9
Country	John Nagel	453	9.6	+9.6
Total formal votes		4,737	97.6	−1.2
Informal votes		115	2.4	+1.2
Turnout		4,852	92.1	+11.5
After distribution of preferences
Country	Arnold Piesse	2,434	51.4	
Labor	Martin Hartigan	1,496	31.6	
Country	Arthur Watts	807	17.0	
Country hold		Swing	N/A	

- Preferences were not distributed to completion.

1930 Western Australian state election: Katanning
Party	Candidate	Votes	%	±%
Independent Country	Arnold Piesse	2,536	62.1	
Country	Alec Thomson	1,546	37.9	
Total formal votes		4,082	98.8	
Informal votes		49	1.2	
Turnout		4,131	80.6	
Independent Country gain from Country		Swing		

=== Elections in the 1920s ===
1927 Western Australian state election: Katanning
Party	Candidate	Votes	%	±%
Country	Alec Thomson	2,246	70.7	+5.5
Labor	David Parker	931	29.3	−5.5
Total formal votes		3,177	99.1	−0.3
Informal votes		28	0.9	+0.3
Turnout		3,205	70.7	+6.6
Country hold		Swing	+5.5	

1924 Western Australian state election: Katanning
Party	Candidate	Votes	%	±%
Executive Country	Alexander Thomson	1,634	65.2	+65.2
Country	George McLeod	873	34.8	−39.8
Total formal votes		2,507	99.4	−0.2
Informal votes		16	0.6	+0.2
Turnout		2,523	64.1	+9.1
Executive Country gain from Country		Swing	N/A	

1921 Western Australian state election: Katanning
Party	Candidate	Votes	%	±%
Country	Alec Thomson	1,258	74.6	+8.3
Labor	Washington Mather	428	25.4	+25.4
Total formal votes		1,686	99.6	+1.9
Informal votes		6	0.6	−1.9
Turnout		1,692	55.0	−7.0
Country hold		Swing	N/A	

=== Elections in the 1910s ===
1917 Western Australian state election: Katanning
Party	Candidate	Votes	%	±%
National Country	Alec Thomson	1,383	66.3	+10.4
National Country	Alfred Fisher	518	24.8	+24.8
National Country	James Crawford	184	8.8	+8.8
Total formal votes		2,085	97.7	–2.2
Informal votes		49	2.3	+2.2
Turnout		2,134	62.0	+8.6
National Country hold		Swing	N/A	

1914 Western Australian state election: Katanning
Party	Candidate	Votes	%	±%
Liberal	Alec Thomson	1,226	55.8	−21.6
Country	Norman Macrae	969	44.2	+44.2
Total formal votes		2,195	99.9	+0.6
Informal votes		3	0.1	−0.6
Turnout		2,198	53.4	−15.5
Liberal hold		Swing	N/A	

1911 Western Australian state election: Katanning
Party	Candidate	Votes	%	±%
Ministerialist	Arnold Piesse	1,310	77.4	
Independent	George Irving	382	22.6	
Total formal votes		1,692	99.3	
Informal votes		12	0.7	
Turnout		1,704	68.9	
Ministerialist hold		Swing		

=== Elections in the 1900s ===
1909 Katanning state by-election
Party	Candidate	Votes	%	±%
Ministerialist	Arnold Piesse	unopposed		
Ministerialist hold		Swing		

1908 Western Australian state election: Katanning
Party	Candidate	Votes	%	±%
Ministerialist	Frederick Piesse	1,045	71.6	−28.4
Ministerialist	Alfred Fisher	414	28.4	+28.4
Total formal votes		1,459	99.7	
Informal votes		4	0.3	
Turnout		1,463	59.0	
Ministerialist hold		Swing	N/A	

1905 Western Australian state election: Katanning
Party	Candidate	Votes	%	±%
Ministerialist	Frederick Henry Piesse	unopposed		
Ministerialist hold		Swing	n/a	

1904 Western Australian state election: Katanning
Party	Candidate	Votes	%	±%
Independent	Frederick Henry Piesse	unopposed		
Independent win		(new seat)		
