= Electoral results for the district of Toodyay =

This is a list of electoral results for the Electoral district of Toodyay in Western Australian state elections.

== Members for Toodyay ==
| Member | Party | Term |
|---|---|---|
| Barnard Clarkson | Non-aligned | 1890–1897 |
| Timothy Quinlan | Ministerial | 1897–1911 |
| Alfred Piesse | Liberal | 1911–1914 |
| Alfred Piesse | Country | 1914–1923 |
| Alfred Piesse | Country (MCP) | 1923–1924 |
| John Lindsay | Country (ECP) | 1924 |
| John Lindsay | Country | 1924–1930 |
| Lindsay Thorn | Country | 1930–1959 |
| James Craig | Country | 1959–1971 |
| James Moiler | Labor | 1971–1974 |
| Mick Nanovich | Liberal | 1974–1977 |

== Election results ==
=== Elections in the 1970s ===
1974 Western Australian state election: Toodyay
| Party | Candidate | Votes | % | ±% |
|---|---|---|---|---|
| Labor | Clifford Hunt | 6,101 | 42.8 | |
| Liberal | Mick Nanovich | 5,630 | 39.5 | |
| National Alliance | Albert Tonkin | 2,369 | 16.6 | |
| Australia | George Gaunt | 144 | 1.0 | |
| Total formal votes | | 14,244 | 95.6 | |
| Informal votes | | 660 | 4.4 | |
| Turnout | | 14,904 | 93.2 | |
Two-party-preferred result
| Liberal | Mick Nanovich | 7,420 | 52.1 | |
| Labor | Clifford Hunt | 6,824 | 47.9 | |
| Liberal gain from Labor | | Swing | | |

1971 Western Australian state election: Toodyay
| Party | Candidate | Votes | % | ±% |
|---|---|---|---|---|
| Labor | James Moiler | 3,299 | 50.3 | +5.0 |
| Liberal | John Waghorne | 1,489 | 22.7 | +22.7 |
| Country | Joseph Wroth | 1,267 | 19.3 | −35.4 |
| Democratic Labor | Arthur White | 259 | 3.9 | +3.9 |
| Independent | Joseph O'Callaghan | 245 | 3.7 | +3.7 |
| Total formal votes | | 6,559 | 96.1 | −0.2 |
| Informal votes | | 269 | 3.9 | +0.2 |
| Turnout | | 6,828 | 90.4 | −4.0 |
Two-party-preferred result
| Labor | James Moiler | 3,518 | 53.6 | +8.3 |
| Liberal | John Waghorne | 3,041 | 46.4 | +46.4 |
| Labor gain from Country | | Swing | +8.3 | |

=== Elections in the 1960s ===
1968 Western Australian state election: Toodyay
| Party | Candidate | Votes | % | ±% |
|---|---|---|---|---|
| Country | James Craig | 2,811 | 54.7 | |
| Labor | Edmond Hewett | 2,329 | 45.3 | |
| Total formal votes | | 5,140 | 96.3 | |
| Informal votes | | 195 | 3.7 | |
| Turnout | | 5,335 | 94.4 | |
| Country hold | | Swing | | |

1965 Western Australian state election: Toodyay
| Party | Candidate | Votes | % | ±% |
|---|---|---|---|---|
| Country | James Craig | 3,588 | 74.2 | +12.2 |
| Independent | Charles Hooper | 1,244 | 25.8 | +25.8 |
| Total formal votes | | 4,832 | 93.8 | −4.3 |
| Informal votes | | 317 | 6.2 | +4.3 |
| Turnout | | 5,149 | 91.2 | +0.2 |
| Country hold | | Swing | N/A | |

1962 Western Australian state election: Toodyay
| Party | Candidate | Votes | % | ±% |
|---|---|---|---|---|
| Country | James Craig | 3,044 | 62.0 | |
| Labor | Slavejko Geroff | 1,500 | 30.6 | |
| Democratic Labor | Leo Agnello | 365 | 7.4 | |
| Total formal votes | | 4,909 | 98.1 | |
| Informal votes | | 93 | 1.9 | |
| Turnout | | 5,002 | 91.0 | |
Two-party-preferred result
| Country | James Craig | | 68.3 | |
| Labor | Slavejko Geroff | | 31.7 | |
| Country hold | | Swing | | |

- Two party preferred vote was estimated.

=== Elections in the 1950s ===
1959 Western Australian state election: Toodyay
| Party | Candidate | Votes | % | ±% |
|---|---|---|---|---|
| Labor | John Rolinson | 1,541 | 34.2 | −15.1 |
| Country | James Craig | 1,433 | 31.8 | −18.9 |
| Country | Joseph Farrell | 1,422 | 31.6 | +31.6 |
| Independent Labor | John Acott | 106 | 2.4 | +2.4 |
| Total formal votes | | 4,502 | 97.7 | 0.0 |
| Informal votes | | 108 | 2.3 | 0.0 |
| Turnout | | 4,610 | 91.9 | +3.0 |
Two-party-preferred result
| Country | James Craig | 2,773 | 61.6 | +10.9 |
| Labor | John Rolinson | 1,729 | 38.4 | −10.9 |
| Country hold | | Swing | +10.9 | |

1956 Western Australian state election: Toodyay
| Party | Candidate | Votes | % | ±% |
|---|---|---|---|---|
| Country | Lindsay Thorn | 2,180 | 50.7 | |
| Independent Labor | John Rolinson | 2,117 | 49.3 | |
| Total formal votes | | 4,297 | 97.7 | |
| Informal votes | | 103 | 2.3 | |
| Turnout | | 4,400 | 88.9 | |
| Country hold | | Swing | | |

1953 Western Australian state election: Toodyay
| Party | Candidate | Votes | % | ±% |
|---|---|---|---|---|
| Country | Lindsay Thorn | unopposed | | |
| Country hold | | Swing | | |

1950 Western Australian state election: Toodyay
| Party | Candidate | Votes | % | ±% |
|---|---|---|---|---|
| Country | Lindsay Thorn | 2,754 | 63.5 | |
| Labor | Archibald McNess | 1,580 | 36.5 | |
| Total formal votes | | 4,334 | 98.0 | |
| Informal votes | | 89 | 2.0 | |
| Turnout | | 4,423 | 86.2 | |
| Country hold | | Swing | | |

=== Elections in the 1940s ===
1947 Western Australian state election: Toodyay
| Party | Candidate | Votes | % | ±% |
|---|---|---|---|---|
| Country | Lindsay Thorn | unopposed | | |
| Country hold | | Swing | | |

1943 Western Australian state election: Toodyay
| Party | Candidate | Votes | % | ±% |
|---|---|---|---|---|
| Country | Lindsay Thorn | 2,290 | 67.0 | −33.0 |
| Labor | Dominic Johnston | 1,127 | 33.0 | +33.0 |
| Total formal votes | | 3,417 | 98.6 | |
| Informal votes | | 49 | 1.4 | |
| Turnout | | 3,466 | 80.6 | |
| Country hold | | Swing | N/A | |

=== Elections in the 1930s ===
1939 Western Australian state election: Toodyay
| Party | Candidate | Votes | % | ±% |
|---|---|---|---|---|
| Country | Lindsay Thorn | unopposed | | |
| Country hold | | Swing | | |

1936 Western Australian state election: Toodyay
| Party | Candidate | Votes | % | ±% |
|---|---|---|---|---|
| Country | Lindsay Thorn | unopposed | | |
| Country hold | | Swing | | |

1933 Western Australian state election: Toodyay
| Party | Candidate | Votes | % | ±% |
|---|---|---|---|---|
| Country | Lindsay Thorn | unopposed | | |
| Country hold | | Swing | | |

1930 Western Australian state election: Toodyay
| Party | Candidate | Votes | % | ±% |
|---|---|---|---|---|
| Country | Lindsay Thorn | 1,026 | 42.2 | |
| Country | Ignatius Boyle | 888 | 36.5 | |
| Independent Country | James Pollitt | 294 | 12.1 | |
| Nationalist | Richard Fitzgerald | 224 | 9.2 | |
| Total formal votes | | 2,432 | 98.7 | |
| Informal votes | | 32 | 1.3 | |
| Turnout | | 2,464 | 71.7 | |
Two-candidate-preferred result
| Country | Lindsay Thorn | 1,313 | 54.0 | |
| Country | Ignatius Boyle | 1,119 | 46.0 | |
| Country hold | | Swing | | |

=== Elections in the 1920s ===
1927 Western Australian state election: Toodyay
| Party | Candidate | Votes | % | ±% |
|---|---|---|---|---|
| Country | John Lindsay | 1,762 | 61.1 | +35.7 |
| Country | Ignatius Boyle | 1,122 | 38.9 | +21.2 |
| Total formal votes | | 2,884 | 99.3 | +1.5 |
| Informal votes | | 20 | 0.7 | −1.5 |
| Turnout | | 2,904 | 60.7 | +4.3 |
| Country hold | | Swing | N/A | |

1924 Western Australian state election: Toodyay
| Party | Candidate | Votes | % | ±% |
|---|---|---|---|---|
| Country | Alfred Piesse | 645 | 28.6 | −31.1 |
| Executive Country | John Lindsay | 574 | 25.4 | +25.4 |
| Executive Country | Ignatius Boyle | 399 | 17.7 | +17.7 |
| Executive Country | Charles Fraser | 346 | 15.3 | +15.3 |
| Nationalist | Robert Gamble | 293 | 13.0 | +13.0 |
| Total formal votes | | 2,257 | 97.8 | +0.1 |
| Informal votes | | 51 | 2.2 | −0.1 |
| Turnout | | 2,308 | 56.4 | +6.0 |
Two-candidate-preferred result
| Executive Country | John Lindsay | 1,187 | 52.6 | +52.6 |
| Country | Alfred Piesse | 1,070 | 47.4 | −12.3 |
| Executive Country gain from Country | | Swing | N/A | |

1921 Western Australian state election: Toodyay
| Party | Candidate | Votes | % | ±% |
|---|---|---|---|---|
| Country | Alfred Piesse | 959 | 59.7 | +18.6 |
| Independent Country | Henry Clarkson | 647 | 40.3 | +27.6 |
| Total formal votes | | 1,606 | 97.7 | 0.0 |
| Informal votes | | 37 | 2.3 | 0.0 |
| Turnout | | 1,643 | 50.4 | +5.2 |
| Country hold | | Swing | +0.9 | |

=== Elections in the 1910s ===
1917 Western Australian state election: Toodyay
| Party | Candidate | Votes | % | ±% |
|---|---|---|---|---|
| National Country | Alfred Piesse | 747 | 41.1 | –58.9 |
| Country | Sinclair McGibbon | 564 | 31.0 | +31.0 |
| Nationalist | Ivan Royal | 277 | 15.2 | +15.2 |
| National Country | Henry Clarkson | 231 | 12.7 | +12.7 |
| Total formal votes | | 1,819 | 97.7 | n/a |
| Informal votes | | 43 | 2.3 | n/a |
| Turnout | | 1,862 | 55.6 | n/a |
Two-party-preferred result
| National Country | Alfred Piesse | 1,070 | 58.8 | –41.2 |
| Country | Sinclair McGibbon | 749 | 41.2 | +41.2 |
| National Country hold | | Swing | –41.2 | |

- Piesse's designation at the 1914 election was simply "Country", rather than "National Country".

1914 Western Australian state election: Toodyay
| Party | Candidate | Votes | % | ±% |
|---|---|---|---|---|
| Country | Alfred Piesse | unopposed | | |
| Country gain from Liberal | | Swing | N/A | |

1911 Western Australian state election: Toodyay
| Party | Candidate | Votes | % | ±% |
|---|---|---|---|---|
| Ministerialist | Timothy Quinlan | 790 | 36.1 | |
| Ministerialist | Alfred Piesse | 727 | 33.3 | |
| Labor | Ernest Mitchell | 669 | 30.6 | |
| Total formal votes | | 2,186 | 99.0 | |
| Informal votes | | 22 | 1.0 | |
| Turnout | | 2,208 | 63.2 | |
Two-candidate-preferred result
| Ministerialist | Alfred Piesse | 1,171 | 53.6 | |
| Ministerialist | Timothy Quinlan | 1,015 | 46.4 | |
| Ministerialist hold | | Swing | | |

=== Elections in the 1900s ===
1908 Western Australian state election: Toodyay
| Party | Candidate | Votes | % | ±% |
|---|---|---|---|---|
| Ministerialist | Timothy Quinlan | 740 | 68.5 | −31.5 |
| Ministerialist | Fitzgerald Frazer | 341 | 31.5 | +31.5 |
| Total formal votes | | 1,081 | 98.5 | |
| Informal votes | | 16 | 1.5 | |
| Turnout | | 1,097 | 57.7 | |
| Ministerialist hold | | Swing | N/A | |

1905 Western Australian state election: Toodyay
| Party | Candidate | Votes | % | ±% |
|---|---|---|---|---|
| Ministerialist | Timothy Quinlan | unopposed | | |
| Ministerialist hold | | Swing | | |

1904 Western Australian state election: Toodyay
| Party | Candidate | Votes | % | ±% |
|---|---|---|---|---|
| Ministerialist | Timothy Quinlan | unopposed | | |
| Ministerialist hold | | Swing | | |

1901 Western Australian state election: Toodyay
| Party | Candidate | Votes | % | ±% |
|---|---|---|---|---|
| Ministerialist | Timothy Quinlan | 351 | 66.1 | +2.5 |
| Independent | Vernon Hamersley | 180 | 33.9 | +33.9 |
| Total formal votes | | 531 | 97.4 | –1.0 |
| Informal votes | | 14 | 2.6 | +1.0 |
| Turnout | | 545 | 76.0 | –6.1 |
| Ministerialist hold | | Swing | N/A | |

=== Elections in the 1890s ===
1897 Western Australian colonial election: Toodyay
| Party | Candidate | Votes | % | ±% |
|---|---|---|---|---|
| Ministerialist | Timothy Quinlan | 201 | 63.6 | |
| Ministerialist | Barnard Clarkson | 115 | 36.4 | |
| Total formal votes | | 316 | 98.4 | |
| Informal votes | | 5 | 1.6 | |
| Turnout | | 321 | 82.1 | |
| Ministerialist hold | | Swing | | |

1894 Western Australian colonial election: Toodyay
| Party | Candidate | Votes | % | ±% |
|---|---|---|---|---|
| None | Barnard Clarkson | unopposed | | |

1890 Western Australian colonial election: Toodyay
| Party | Candidate | Votes | % | ±% |
|---|---|---|---|---|
| None | Barnard Clarkson | 83 | 52.5 | n/a |
| None | Charles Dempster | 75 | 47.5 | n/a |
