= Candidates of the 1933 Western Australian state election =

The 1933 Western Australian state election was held on 8 April 1933.

== Retiring Members ==
=== Labor ===
- Edwin Corboy (MLA) (Yilgarn-Coolgardie)
- Alfred Lamond (MLA) (Pilbara)

== Legislative Assembly ==
Sitting members are shown in bold text. Successful candidates are highlighted in the relevant colour. Where there is possible confusion, an asterisk (*) is also used.

Electorate	Held by	Labor candidate	Nationalist candidate	Country candidate	Other candidates
Albany	Labor	**Arthur Wansbrough**		William Day; Alfred Lawrence	George Cooper (Ind. Country)
Avon	Country	Fred Law		**Harry Griffiths***; John Mann	
Beverley	Country			**James Mann***; Charles Wansbrough	
Boulder	Labor	**Philip Collier**			Wilfred Mountjoy (Communist)
Brown Hill-Ivanhoe	Labor	**Frederick Smith**			
Bunbury	Labor	**Frederick Withers**	John Hands		
Canning	Nationalist	Charles Cross	**Herbert Wells**; Henry Pilgrim	Leonard Perrin	
Claremont	Nationalist		**Charles North***; Donald Cleland; Clarence Briggs		
Collie	Labor	**Arthur Wilson**			Harry Stapledon (Ind. Labor)
East Perth	Labor	**James Kenneally**	William Murray		Carlyle Ferguson (Independent)
Forrest	Labor	**May Holman**		William Hollingsworth	
Fremantle	Labor	**Joseph Sleeman**	Aidan Bryan		
Gascoyne	Nationalist	Frank Wise	**Edward Angelo**		
Geraldton	Labor	**John Willcock**			
Greenough	Country	John Steele		**William Patrick***; Kenneth Jones	Paul McGuiness (Ind. Country)
Guildford-Midland	Labor	**William Johnson**	Robert Crowther		
Hannans	Labor	**Selby Munsie**			
Irwin-Moore	Country		Edmund Nicholson	**Percy Ferguson***; Corintin Honner	
Kalgoorlie	Labor	**James Cunningham**	Ernest Williams; Francis O'Dea		
Kanowna	Labor	**Emil Nulsen**			
Katanning	Country	Martin Hartigan		**Arnold Piesse***; Arthur Watts; John Nagel	
Kimberley	Labor	**Aubrey Coverley**	Arthur Povah		
Leederville	Labor	**Alexander Panton**	Henry Simper; Ernest Caddy		
Maylands	Nationalist	Robert Clothier	**John Scaddan**; Arthur Daley; Charles Plunkett		Frederick Swaine (Independent)
Middle Swan	Labor	**James Hegney**	Karl Drake-Brockman; William Southwood; John Pickering	George Gaunt	
Mount Hawthorn	Labor	**Harry Millington**	Hugh Henderson		
Mount Magnet	Labor	**Michael Troy**			
Mount Marshall	Country			**John Lindsay**	Frederick Warner (Ind. Country)
Murchison	Labor	**William Marshall**			Donald Dunjey (Ind. Labor)
Murray-Wellington	Nationalist		**Ross McLarty**		
Nedlands	Nationalist	Frank Darcey	**Norbert Keenan**		
Nelson	Nationalist	Walter Toyer	**John Smith**	William Huggett; Frederick Knapp	
North Perth	Nationalist		**James Smith**		Edward White (Single Tax League)
North-East Fremantle	Nationalist	John Tonkin	**Hubert Parker**		
Northam	Nationalist	Albert Hawke	**James Mitchell**	Thomas Peterson	
Perth	Nationalist	Ted Needham	**Harry Mann**		
Pilbara	Labor	James McGuire	Frank Welsh		
Pingelly	Country	Keith Growden		Harrie Seward	Cecil Elsegood (Independent)
Roebourne	Nationalist	Alec Rodoreda	**John Church**		
South Fremantle	Labor	**Alick McCallum**			Joshua Warner (Ind. Nationalist); Gregory Collins (Communist)
Subiaco	Nationalist	John Moloney	**Walter Richardson**		John Bathgate (Independent)
Sussex	Nationalist	Herbert Swinbourne	Edmund Brockman*; **George Barnard**		Robert Falkingham (Independent)
Swan	Nationalist		William Orr	**Richard Sampson**	
Toodyay	Country			**Lindsay Thorn**	
Victoria Park	Labor	**Howard Raphael**	Charles Harper; Oliver Strang		
Wagin	Country			**Sydney Stubbs**	
West Perth	Nationalist	John Blair	Robert McDonald		Leonard Goold (Ind. Nationalist); Frank Cato (Ind. Nationalist)
Williams-Narrogin	Country			**Victor Doney**	Arthur McCormick (Independent)
Yilgarn-Coolgardie	Labor	George Lambert			Jim Keightly (Ind. Country)
York	Country			**Charles Latham**	Donald Sutherland (Ind. Country); Charles Foreman (Independent)

== See also ==
- Members of the Western Australian Legislative Assembly, 1930–1933
- Members of the Western Australian Legislative Assembly, 1933–1936
- 1933 Western Australian state election
