= Members of the Western Australian Legislative Assembly, 1933–1936 =

This is a list of members of the Western Australian Legislative Assembly between the 1933 election and the 1936 election, together known as the 15th Parliament.

Name	Party	District	Years in office
Ignatius Boyle^{[5]}	Country	Avon	1935–1943
Edmund Brockman	Nationalist	Sussex	1933–1938
Robert Clothier	Labor	Maylands	1933–1936
Philip Collier^{[1]}	Labor	Boulder	1905–1948
Aubrey Coverley^{[2]}	Labor	Kimberley	1924–1953
Charles Cross	Labor	Canning	1933–1947
James Cunningham	Labor	Kalgoorlie	1923–1936
Victor Doney	Country	Williams-Narrogin	1928–1956
Percy Ferguson	Country	Irwin-Moore	1927–1939
Thomas Fox^{[3]}	Labor	South Fremantle	1935–1951
Harry Griffiths^{[5]}	Country	Avon	1914–1921; 1924–1935
Albert Hawke	Labor	Northam	1933–1968
James Hegney	Labor	Middle Swan	1930–1947; 1950–1968
May Holman	Labor	Forrest	1925–1939
William Johnson	Labor	Guildford-Midland	1901–1905; 1906–1917; 1924–1948
Norbert Keenan	Nationalist	Nedlands	1904–1911; 1930–1950
James Kenneally^{[1]}	Labor	East Perth	1927–1936
George Lambert	Labor	Yilgarn-Coolgardie	1917–1930; 1933–1941
Charles Latham	Country	York	1921–1942
Alick McCallum^{[1]}^{[3]}	Labor	South Fremantle	1921–1935
Robert McDonald	Nationalist	West Perth	1933–1950
Ross McLarty	Nationalist	Murray-Wellington	1930–1962
James Mann	Country	Beverley	1930–1962
William Marshall	Labor	Murchison	1921–1952
Harry Millington^{[1]}	Labor	Mount Hawthorn	1924–1947
John Moloney	Labor	Subiaco	1933–1936
Selby Munsie^{[1]}	Labor	Hannans	1911–1938
Ted Needham	Labor	Perth	1904–1905; 1933–1953
Charles North	Nationalist	Claremont	1924–1956
Emil Nulsen	Labor	Kanowna	1932–1962
Alexander Panton	Labor	Leederville	1924–1951
William Patrick	Country	Greenough	1930–1943
Arnold Piesse^{[6]}	Country	Katanning	1909–1914; 1930–1935
Howard Raphael	Labor	Victoria Park	1930–1944
Alec Rodoreda	Labor	Roebourne	1933–1958
Richard Sampson	Country	Swan	1921–1944
Harrie Seward	Country	Pingelly	1933–1950
Joseph Sleeman	Labor	Fremantle	1924–1959
Frederick Smith	Labor	Brown Hill-Ivanhoe	1932–1950
James MacCallum Smith	Nationalist	North Perth	1914–1939
John Henry Smith	Nationalist	Nelson	1921–1936; 1939–1943
Sydney Stubbs	Country	Wagin	1911–1947
Lindsay Thorn	Country	Toodyay	1930–1959
John Tonkin	Labor	North-East Fremantle	1933–1977
Michael Troy^{[1]}	Labor	Mount Magnet	1904–1939
Arthur Wansbrough	Labor	Albany	1924–1936
Frederick Warner	Ind. Country	Mount Marshall	1933–1943
Arthur Watts^{[6]}	Country	Katanning	1935–1962
Frank Welsh	Nationalist	Pilbara	1933–1939
John Willcock^{[1]}	Labor	Geraldton	1917–1947
Arthur Wilson	Labor	Collie	1908–1947
Frank Wise^{[4]}	Labor	Gascoyne	1933–1951
Frederick Withers	Labor	Bunbury	1924–1947

== Notes ==
^{1} Following the 1933 state election a new Ministry consisting of eight members, including one Member of the Legislative Council, was appointed on 24 April 1933. These members were therefore required to resign and contest ministerial by-elections on 2 May 1933, at which all were returned unopposed.
^{2} At the 1933 election, Labor member Aubrey Coverley won the seat of Kimberley by just 32 votes against the Nationalist candidate Arthur Povah. On 3 July 1933, the Court of Disputed Returns ordered a fresh election for 29 July, which Coverley won by 289 votes.
^{3} On 16 March 1935, the Labor member for South Fremantle, Alick McCallum, resigned. Labor candidate Thomas Fox won the resulting by-election held on 4 May 1935.
^{4} Frank Wise was appointed Minister for Agriculture on 26 March 1935 following the departure of Alick McCallum from the Ministry, and was therefore required to resign and contest a ministerial by-election on 11 April 1935, at which he was returned unopposed.
^{5} On 23 March 1935, the Country member for Avon, Harry Griffiths, died. Country candidate Ignatius Boyle won the resulting by-election held on 4 May 1935.
^{6} On 21 July 1935, the Country member for Katanning, Arnold Piesse, died. Country candidate Arthur Watts won the resulting by-election held on 31 August 1935.

== Sources ==
- Black, David; Prescott, Valerie (1997). Election statistics, Legislative Assembly of Western Australia, 1890-1996. Perth: Parliamentary History Project. ISBN 0-7309-8409-5.
- Hughes, Colin A.; Graham, B. D. (1976). Voting for the South Australian, Western Australian and Tasmanian Lower Houses, 1890-1964. Canberra: Australian National University. ISBN 0-7081-1334-6.
