= 1935 Katanning state by-election =

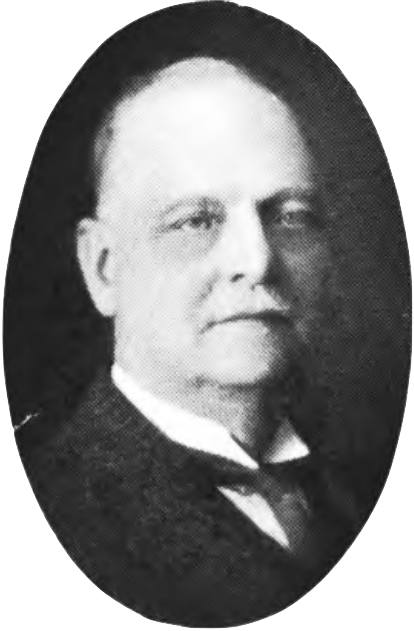
The by-election was necessitated by the death at sea of Arnold Piesse (pictured), who had been the sitting member since the 1930 state election.

A by-election for the seat of Katanning in the Western Australian Legislative Assembly was held on 31 August 1935, following the death of the sitting member, Arnold Piesse of the Country Party. Six candidates contested the election, including three endorsed Country candidates. Neither of the two other major parties, Labor and the Nationalists, fielded candidates. The campaign focused mainly on local issues, and no candidate received more than a quarter of the vote. With preferential voting in use, endorsed Country Party candidate Arthur Watts was elected over unendorsed Country Party candidate Nelson Lemmon after five rounds of counting, beginning Watts' 27-year career in the Legislative Assembly.

== Background and timeline ==
Arnold Edmund Piesse had been the member for Katanning, located in the Great Southern region of Western Australia, since defeating Alec Thomson at the 1930 state election. Piesse had previously held the seat, as a Ministerialist and later a Liberal, from 1909 to 1914, while his brother, Frederick Henry Piesse, had held the seat from 1904 to 1909. Although a sitting member, Piesse left Australia in February 1935 for an extended trip to England for health reasons. However, on 21 July, on the return trip, he committed suicide by jumping overboard. Following the official notification of a vacancy, the Speaker of the Legislative Assembly, Alexander Panton, authorised the issuing of writs for a by-election, which occurred on 30 July. Both the Labor Party and the Nationalist Party declined to field candidates, owing to Katanning's reputation as a safe seat for the Country Party.

== Candidates and positions ==
Six candidates nominated for the vacancy, with nominations closing at noon on Monday, 12 August. The Country Party, endorsed four candidates, although one, John Francis Silverthorne of Muradup, failed to meet the deadline for nominations. Endorsements were made by the Katanning district council of the Primary Producers' Association. The three other candidates were nominally running as independents, although two were affiliated with the Country Party.

- Frederick William Cox, a licensed surveyor from Katanning, ran as an independent Country Party candidate, and stated his intent to support the Country Party in parliament if elected. A returned soldier and long-time resident of the district, he began his campaign on Wednesday, 28 August, at the Gnowangerup Memorial Hall. Cox was in favour of legislating to extend the federal debt adjustment scheme to Western Australia, to assist indebted farmers. He also supported measures to farmers' production costs, as well as extending marketing control measures to wheat and wool.
- Martin Francis Joseph Hartigan, a farmer from Flat Rocks (near Broomehill), ran as an independent candidate. Originally from Victoria, he had emigrated to the Goldfields in 1900, working as a mine owner for 26 years before purchasing property near Broomehill. An unsuccessful candidate at the 1933 election, Hartigan began his campaign on Monday, 12 August, at the Katanning Town Hall, emphasising that he ran as an independent out of a belief that the "interests of the district could best be served by one who was not dominated by party prejudice". He held largely agrarianist views, and supported subsidies for farmers, measures to reduce rural unemployment, and the reduction of freight charges.
- Samuel Kemble, a farmer from Badgebup, ran as one of three endorsed Country candidates. A member of the Katanning Road Board, he began his campaign on Wednesday, 14 August, supporting a comprehensive reform of primary industry in the state, and the adoption of a free trade system, believing that tariffs were the "root cause of all of our troubles". Kemble also advocated the introduction of an independent board to determine interest rates, a natural disaster insurance scheme for primary producers to be funded by a wheat levy, and large-scale reform of local government.

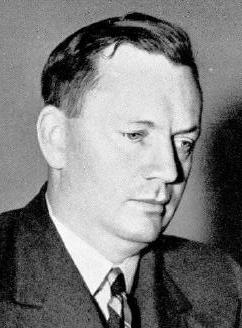
Nelson Lemmon (pictured), who unsuccessful contested Katanning, later entered federal politics, and was Minister for Works and Housing under Ben Chifley.

- Nelson Lemmon (pictured), a farmer from Ongerup, ran as an unendorsed Country candidate. The son of John Lemmon, a Victorian MLA, he was the chairman of the Gnowangerup Road Board and a "prominent member" of the Wheat Growers' Union. Opening his campaign at the Ongerup Hall, Lemmon felt that the debt burden held by primary producers was a "national emergency", and urgent rehabilitation of the primary industries was necessary. He also advocated a reduction of the federal government's taxation powers, as well as a general elimination of government waste. In addition, Lemmon supported the introduction of special provisions for the education of country children, including an increase in the number of government-funded scholarships to metropolitan secondary schools and universities.
- John McDonald, a farmer and grazier from Gnowangerup, ran as one of three endorsed Country candidates. A farmer in the district for 27 years, he began his campaign on Tuesday, 13 August, at the Gnowangerup Memorial Hall. Although supporting the general Country Party platform, McDonald emphasised the need for the decentralisation of the export trade, with bulk-handling facilities to be constructed at Albany and Bunbury. He also supported the introduction of a minimum wage for farm labourers and the establishment of an organised training scheme for youths.
- Arthur Frederick Watts, a barrister and solicitor from Katanning, ran as one of three endorsed Country candidates. A nine-year member of the Katanning Road Board and an unsuccessful candidate at the 1933 election, Watts opened his campaign on Monday, 19 August, at the Katanning Town Hall. He supported the lowering of tariffs, statutory opposition to rises in interest rates, and the extension of the co-operative system, as well as prompt implementation of the recommendations made by the Royal Commission on bulk handling. Watts opposed nationalising banking, and was critical of the state government's attempts to reduce unemployment and the federal government's implementation of the Debt Adjustment Act, both of which he considered unsuccessful.

== Results ==
Counting for the election was completed on the night of Tuesday, 3 September.

Katanning state by-election, 1935
Party	Candidate	Votes	%	±%
Country	Arthur Watts	839	24.89	+9.33
Independent Country	Frederick Cox	674	19.99	+19.99
Independent Country	Nelson Lemmon	580	17.21	+17.21
Country	John McDonald	578	17.15	+17.15
Independent	Martin Hartigan	441	13.08	–15.77
Country	Samuel Kemble	259	6.80	+6.80
Total formal votes		3,300	97.89	n/a
Informal votes		71	2.11	n/a
Turnout		3,371	67.53	n/a
Two-candidate-preferred result
Country	Arthur Watts	1,707	50.64	n/a
Independent Country	Nelson Lemmon	1,664	49.36	n/a
Country hold		Swing	n/a^{[a]}	

== Notes ==
^{a} At the 1933 elections, endorsed Country Party candidates received a total of 71.15% of the vote on first preferences, while at the by-election endorsed Country candidates received 49.72% of the vote on first preferences, which amounts to a swing of –21.43 against the party. If independent Country and unendorsed Country candidates are included, the party received 86.92% of the first-preference vote, which alters the result to a swing of +15.77.
