= Brand–Watts ministry =

23rd Western Australian government ministry

The Brand–Watts Ministry was the 23rd Ministry of the Government of Western Australia, led by Liberal Premier David Brand and his deputy, Country Party leader Arthur Watts. It succeeded the Hawke ministry on 2 April 1959, following the defeat of the Labor government at the 1959 election twelve days earlier. It was succeeded by the Brand–Nalder Ministry on 1 February 1962 following the Deputy Premier's retirement from politics.

== The Ministry ==
On 2 April 1959, the Governor, Sir Charles Gairdner, constituted the Ministry. He designated 10 principal executive offices of the Government and appointed the following ministers to their positions, who served until the end of the Ministry.

The list below is ordered by decreasing seniority within the Cabinet, as indicated by the Government Gazette and the Hansard index. Blue entries indicate members of the Liberal Party, whilst green entries indicate members of the National Country Party. The members of the Ministry were:

Office	Minister
Premier; Treasurer; Minister for Tourism	David Brand, MLA
Deputy Premier; Minister for Education; Minister for Electricity; Attorney-General	Arthur Watts, MLA
Minister for Industrial Development; Minister for the North-West; Minister for Railways	Charles Court, OBE, MLA
Minister for Agriculture	Crawford Nalder, MLA
Minister for Works; Minister for Water Supplies	Gerald Wild, MLA
Leader of the Government in the Legislative Council; Minister for Mines; Minister for Housing	Arthur Griffith, MLC
Minister for Lands; Minister for Forests; Minister for Immigration; Minister for Labour (from 16 November 1961)	Stewart Bovell, MLA
Minister for Transport; Minister for Police; Minister for Labour; Minister for Native Welfare	Charles Perkins, MLA (until 7 November 1961)
Chief Secretary; Minister for Health; Minister for Fisheries	Ross Hutchinson, DPC, MLA
Minister for Local Government; Minister for Town Planning; Minister for Child Welfare	Leslie Logan, MLC
Minister for Transport; Minister for Police; Minister for Native Welfare	George Cornell, MLA (from 16 November 1961)

Preceded by Hawke Ministry	Brand–Watts Ministry; 1959-1962	Succeeded by Brand–Nalder Ministry
