= Electoral results for the district of Middle Swan =

Western Australian district election results

This is a list of electoral results for the Electoral district of Middle Swan in Western Australian state elections.

== Members for Middle Swan ==
Member	Party	Term
James Hegney	Labor	1930–1947
Bill Grayden	Liberal	1947–1949
James Hegney	Labor	1950–1962

== Election results ==
=== Elections in the 1950s ===
1959 Western Australian state election: Middle Swan
Party	Candidate	Votes	%	±%
Labor	James Hegney	5,364	55.4	−44.6
Liberal and Country	Francis Wilson	3,699	38.2	+38.2
Democratic Labor	Brian Peachey	623	6.4	+6.4
Total formal votes		9,686	97.9	
Informal votes		205	2.1	
Turnout		9,891	91.9	
Two-party-preferred result
Labor	James Hegney		56.3	−43.7
Liberal and Country	Francis Wilson		43.7	+43.7
Labor hold		Swing	N/A	

- Two party preferred vote was estimated.

1956 Western Australian state election: Middle Swan
Party	Candidate	Votes	%	±%
Labor	James Hegney	unopposed		
Labor hold		Swing		

1953 Western Australian state election: Middle Swan
Party	Candidate	Votes	%	±%
Labor	James Hegney	unopposed		
Labor hold		Swing		

1950 Western Australian state election: Middle Swan
Party	Candidate	Votes	%	±%
Labor	James Hegney	4,480	53.1	
Liberal and Country	Henry Hawkins	3,955	46.9	
Total formal votes		8,435	97.9	
Informal votes		177	2.1	
Turnout		8,612	91.7	
Labor gain from Liberal and Country		Swing		

=== Elections in the 1940s ===
1947 Western Australian state election: Middle Swan
Party	Candidate	Votes	%	±%
Labor	James Hegney	4,933	47.1	−2.0
Liberal	Bill Grayden	4,180	39.9	+12.6
Country	Mary Hamersley	1,370	13.1	+13.1
Total formal votes		10,483	97.9	+0.6
Informal votes		220	2.1	−0.6
Turnout		10,703	85.1	+0.6
Two-party-preferred result
Liberal	Bill Grayden	5,267	50.2	+8.3
Labor	James Hegney	5,216	49.8	−8.3
Liberal gain from Labor		Swing	+8.3	

1943 Western Australian state election: Middle Swan
Party	Candidate	Votes	%	±%
Labor	James Hegney	4,183	49.1	−2.9
Nationalist	Karl Drake-Brockman	2,326	27.3	−20.7
Independent	Henry Hawkins	2,004	23.5	+23.5
Total formal votes		8,513	97.3	−0.1
Informal votes		236	2.7	+0.1
Turnout		8,749	84.5	−4.1
Two-party-preferred result
Labor	James Hegney	4,945	58.1	+6.1
Nationalist	Karl Drake-Brockman	3,568	41.9	−6.1
Labor hold		Swing	+6.1	

=== Elections in the 1930s ===
1939 Western Australian state election: Middle Swan
Party	Candidate	Votes	%	±%
Labor	James Hegney	4,311	52.0	−6.8
Nationalist	Karl Drake-Brockman	3,979	48.0	+6.8
Total formal votes		8,290	97.4	−1.3
Informal votes		220	2.6	+1.3
Turnout		8,510	88.6	+26.2
Labor hold		Swing	−6.8	

1936 Western Australian state election: Middle Swan
Party	Candidate	Votes	%	±%
Labor	James Hegney	3,061	58.8	−0.6
Nationalist	David Pyvis	2,148	41.2	+22.5
Total formal votes		5,209	98.7	+2.4
Informal votes		70	1.3	−2.4
Turnout		5,279	62.4	−27.9
Labor hold		Swing	N/A	

1933 Western Australian state election: Middle Swan
Party	Candidate	Votes	%	±%
Labor	James Hegney	4,081	59.4	+11.9
Nationalist	Karl Drake-Brockman	1,286	18.7	−3.9
Nationalist	William Southwood	658	9.6	+9.6
Nationalist	John Pickering	599	8.7	+8.7
Country	George Gaunt	244	3.5	−9.9
Total formal votes		6,868	96.3	−1.9
Informal votes		265	3.7	+1.9
Turnout		7,133	90.3	+19.9
Labor hold		Swing	N/A	

- Preferences were not distributed.

1930 Western Australian state election: Middle Swan
Party	Candidate	Votes	%	±%
Labor	James Hegney	2,263	47.5	
Nationalist	Dick Ardagh	1,076	22.6	
Nationalist	Albert McGilvray	791	16.6	
Country	Alfred Yeates	638	13.4	
Total formal votes		4,683	98.2	
Informal votes		85	1.8	
Turnout		4,853	70.4	
Two-party-preferred result
Labor	James Hegney	2,532	53.1	
Nationalist	Dick Ardagh	2,236	46.9	
Labor hold		Swing		
