= Brand–Nalder ministry =

The Brand–Nalder Ministry was the 24th Ministry of the Government of Western Australia, led by Liberal Premier David Brand and his deputy, Country Party leader Crawford Nalder. It succeeded the Brand–Watts Ministry on 1 February 1962 following the Deputy Premier's retirement from politics. The ministry was followed by the Tonkin Ministry on 3 March 1971 after the Coalition lost government at the state election held on 23 February.

== First Ministry ==
On 1 February 1962, the Governor, Sir Charles Gairdner, constituted the Ministry. He designated 10 principal executive offices of the Government and appointed the following ministers to their positions, who served until the reconstitution of the Ministry after the 1965 state election.

The list below is ordered by decreasing seniority within the Cabinet, as indicated by the Government Gazette and the Hansard index. Blue entries indicate members of the Liberal Party, whilst green entries indicate members of the National Country Party. The members of the Ministry were:

Office	Minister
Premier; Treasurer; Minister for Tourism	David Brand, MLA
Deputy Premier; Minister for Agriculture; Minister for Electricity (from 12 April 1962)	Crawford Nalder, MLA
Minister for Industrial Development; Minister for the North-West; Minister for Railways	Charles Court, OBE, MLA
Minister for Works; Minister for Water Supplies; Minister for Labour (from 12 April 1962)	Gerald Wild, MLA
Leader of the Government in the Legislative Council; Minister for Mines; Minister for Housing; Minister for Justice	Arthur Griffith, MLC
Minister for Lands; Minister for Forests; Minister for Immigration; Minister for Labour (until 12 April 1962)	Stewart Bovell, MLA
Chief Secretary; Minister for Health; Minister for Fisheries	Ross Hutchinson, DPC, MLA
Minister for Local Government; Minister for Town Planning; Minister for Child Welfare	Leslie Logan, MLC
Minister for Transport; Minister for Police; Minister for Native Welfare	George Cornell, MLA (until 12 April 1962)
Minister for Education; Minister for Electricity (until 12 April 1962); Minister for Native Welfare (from 12 April 1962)	Edgar Lewis, MLA
Minister for Transport; Minister for Police	James Craig, MLA (from 12 April 1962)

== Second Ministry ==
On 16 March 1965, the Governor, Major-General Sir Douglas Kendrew, constituted the Ministry. He designated 10 principal executive offices of the Government and appointed the following ministers to their positions, who served until the end of the Ministry. Two honorary ministers were also appointed; following the passage of the Constitution Acts Amendment Act 1965 (No.2 of 1965) on 13 August 1965, the ministry grew to include 12 members and the two honorary ministers, Ray O'Connor and Graham MacKinnon, were brought into the Ministry.

Office	Minister
Premier; Treasurer; Minister for Tourism	David Brand, MLA
Deputy Premier; Minister for Agriculture; Minister for Electricity	Crawford Nalder, MLA
Minister for Industrial Development; Minister for the North-West; Minister for Railways (until 16 February 1967); Minister for Transport (until 17 August 1965)	Charles Court, OBE, MLA
Leader of the Government in the Legislative Council; Minister for Mines; Minister for Justice	Arthur Griffith, MLC
Minister for Lands; Minister for Forests; Minister for Immigration	Stewart Bovell, MLA
Minister for Health (until 17 August 1965); Minister for Fisheries and Fauna (until 17 August 1965); Minister for Works; Minister for Water Supplies	Ross Hutchinson, DFC, MLA
Minister for Local Government; Minister for Town Planning; Minister for Child Welfare	Leslie Logan, MLC
Minister for Education; Minister for Native Welfare	Edgar Lewis, MLA
Chief Secretary; Minister for Police; Minister for Traffic	James Craig, MLA
Minister for Housing; Minister for Labour	Des O'Neil, DipEd, MLA
Minister for Transport; Minister for Railways (from 16 February 1967)	Ray O'Connor, MLA (from 17 August 1965)
Minister for Health; Minister for Fisheries and Fauna; Minister for Environmental Protection (from 10 December 1970)	Graham MacKinnon, ED, JP, MLC (from 17 August 1965)

Preceded by Brand–Watts Ministry	Brand–Nalder Ministry; 1962-1971	Succeeded by Tonkin Ministry
