= Hawke ministry (Western Australia) =

The Hawke ministry was the 22nd ministry of the Government of Western Australia, led by Labor Premier Albert Hawke and deputy John Tonkin. It commenced on 23 February 1953, nine days after the McLarty–Watts Ministry, led by Premier Ross McLarty of the Liberal Party, was defeated at the 1953 election. The ministry was followed by the Brand–Watts Ministry on 2 April 1959 after the Labor Party lost government at the state election held on 21 March.

== First ministry ==
On 23 February 1953, the Governor, Sir Charles Gairdner, constituted the ministry. He designated 10 principal executive offices of the Government and appointed the following ministers to their positions, who served until the reconstitution of the Ministry following the 1956 state election.

The list below is ordered by decreasing seniority within the Cabinet, as indicated by the Government Gazette and the Hansard index. The members of the ministry were:

Office	Minister
Premier; Treasurer; Minister for Child Welfare; Minister for Industrial Development (until 13 May 1954)	Albert Hawke, MLA
Deputy Premier (from 7 December 1955); Minister for Education (until 13 May 1954); Minister for Works; Minister for Water Supplies	John Tonkin, Dip.Tchg., FAIA, MLA
Minister for Education (from 13 May 1954); Minister for Labour; Minister for Native Welfare; Minister for Prices (until 13 May 1954)	Bill Hegney, MLA
Leader of the Government in the Legislative Council; Chief Secretary; Minister for Local Government and Town Planning	Gilbert Fraser, MLC
Minister for Lands; Minister for Agriculture	Ernest Hoar, MLA
Minister for Railways; Minister for Transport; Minister for Police	Herbert Styants, MLA
Minister for Health; Minister for Justice	Emil Nulsen, MLA
Minister for Housing; Minister for Forests	Herb Graham, MLA
Minister for Mines; Minister for Tourism; Minister for Fisheries; Minister for Industrial Development (from 13 May 1954)	Lionel Kelly, MLA
Minister for the North-West; Minister for Supply and Shipping	Harry Strickland, MLC

== Second ministry ==
On 20 April 1956, the Governor, Sir Charles Gairdner, reconstituted the ministry. He designated 10 principal executive offices of the Government and appointed the following ministers to their positions, who served until the end of the ministry. During the term, Ernest Hoar was appointed Agent-General for Western Australia in London, and Gilbert Fraser died on 1 November 1958.

The list below is ordered by decreasing seniority within the Cabinet, as indicated by the Government Gazette and the Hansard index. The members of the ministry were:

Office	Minister
Premier; Treasurer; Minister for Child Welfare; Minister for Industrial Development (19 December 1957 – 13 November 1958)	Albert Hawke, MLA
Deputy Premier; Minister for Works; Minister for Water Supplies	John Tonkin, Dip.Tchg., FAIA, MLA
Minister for Transport; Minister for Housing; Minister for Forests	Herb Graham, MLA
Leader of the Government in the Legislative Council; Chief Secretary; Minister for Local Government and Town Planning	Gilbert Fraser, MLC (until 1 November 1958)
Minister for Lands; Minister for Agriculture	Ernest Hoar, MLA (until 17 December 1957)
Minister for Health; Minister for Justice	Emil Nulsen, MLA
Minister for Education; Minister for Labour	Bill Hegney, MLA
Minister for Fisheries (until 19 December 1957:) Minister for Mines Minister for Industrial Development (from 19 December 1957:) Minister for Lands Minister for Agriculture	Lionel Kelly, MLA
Leader of the Government in the Legislative Council (from 13 November 1958); Minister for Railways; Minister for the North-West; Minister for Supply and Shipping	Harry Strickland, MLC
Minister for Police; Minister for Native Welfare	John Brady, MLA
Minister for Mines; Chief Secretary (from 13 November 1958)	Arthur Moir, MLA (from 19 December 1957)
Minister for Industrial Development; Minister for Local Government and Town Planning	Frank Wise, MLC (from 13 November 1958)

Preceded by McLarty–Watts Ministry	Hawke Ministry; 1953-1959	Succeeded by Brand–Watts Ministry
