= Harry Strickland =

Australian politician

The Honourable Harry Strickland

Member of the Legislative Council of Western Australia
- In office 22 May 1950 – 31 December 1970
- Preceded by: George Miles
- Succeeded by: John Hunt
- Constituency: North Province

Personal details
- Born: 10 June 1903 South Fremantle, Western Australia, Australia
- Died: 2 May 1971 (aged 67) Safety Bay, Western Australia, Australia
- Party: Labor

Harry Charles Strickland (10 June 1903 – 2 May 1971) was an Australian politician who was a Labor Party member of the Legislative Council of Western Australia from 1950 to 1970, representing North Province. He was a minister in the government of Albert Hawke.

Strickland was born in Fremantle to Elizabeth Jane (née Schipper) and William Hitch Strickland. He left school at the age of 13 to work as a jockey, then at the age of 15 moved to the North-West, where he worked as a shearer and a barman. From 1933 to 1937, Strickland leased a hotel in Carnarvon, also serving on the Carnarvon Road Board from 1935 to 1937. After a period in Perth, he returned to Carnarvon in 1947, purchasing a banana plantation. Strickland entered parliament at the 1950 Legislative Council elections, replacing the retiring George Miles.

Following the election of a Labor government at the 1953 state election, Strickland was made Minister for Supply and Shipping and Minister for the North-West in the new ministry formed by Albert Hawke. He was also made Minister for Railways after the 1956 election, and remained in the ministry until the government's defeat at the 1959 election. From 1958 to 1962, Strickland was the leader of the Labor Party in the Legislative Council. He remained in parliament until his resignation in December 1970, and died only a few months later, in May 1971. He had married Thelma Marie Colgan in 1927, with whom he had four children.

Parliament of Western Australia
Political offices
Preceded by Florence Cardell-Oliver	Minister for Supply and Shipping; 1953–1959	Abolished
Preceded by Ross McLarty	Minister for the North-West; 1953–1959	Succeeded by Charles Court
Preceded by Herbert Styants	Minister for Railways; 1956–1959	Succeeded by Charles Court
