= Barnard Drummond Clarkson =

Australian politician

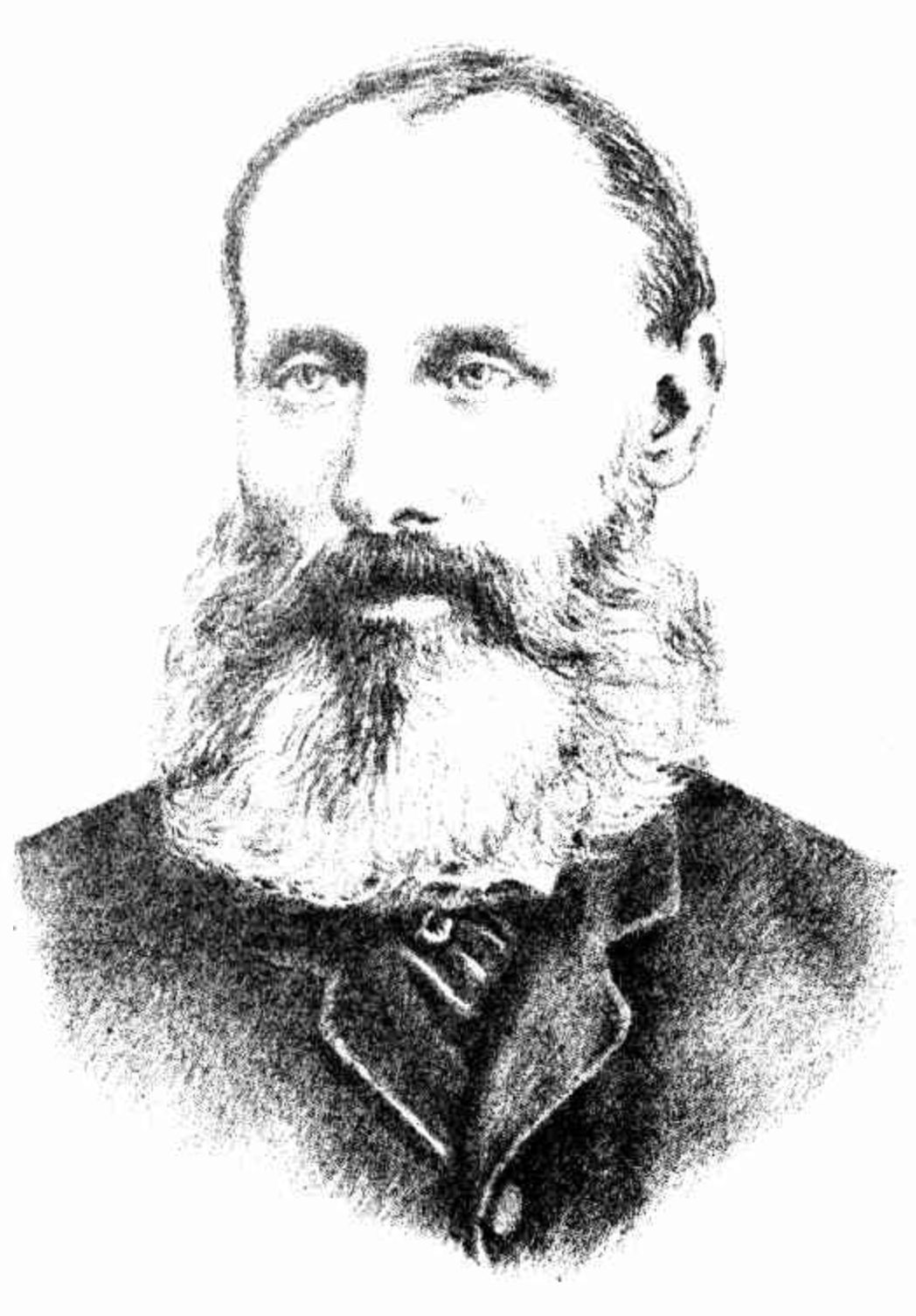
- Clarkson in 1888
- Born: 1836; York, Western Australia
- Died: March 1909 (aged 72–73); Toodyay, Western Australia
- Other names: Bernard Drummond Clarkson
- Occupations: Pastoralist, explorer and politician

Barnard Drummond Clarkson, born near York, Western Australia in 1836, was a pastoralist, explorer and politician. The Perth suburb of Clarkson was named after him.

== Family ==
Clarkson's father Michael Clarkson arrived in the Swan River Colony in 1830 and married Jane Drummond, eldest daughter of James Drummond, on 7 November 1833. They had five sons, including Barnard, and two daughters. In 1867 Barnard Clarkson married Isabella Lukin, daughter of Lionel Lukin; they three sons and three daughters. Clarkson died in March 1909 at Mt Anderson near Toodyay.

== Political life ==
In 1867 Clarkson was appointed as Justice of the Peace for Western Australia. He was a member of the Toodyay Road Board for a number of years and was chairman from 1901 to 1904. In 1890 when Western Australia obtain responsible government Clarkson became the first member of the Western Australian Legislative Assembly for the seat of Toodyay, a post he held until 1897. During this time he was a supporter of John Forrest.
