= Alfred Piesse =

Western Australian politician

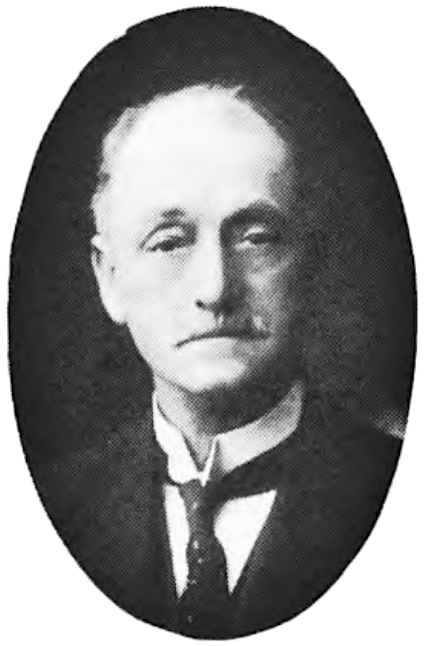

Deputy Leader of the Country Party in Western Australia
- In office 31 March 1915 – 12 May 1921
- Leader: Francis Willmott; Tom Harrison
- Preceded by: Francis Willmott
- Succeeded by: Alec Thomson

Member of the Western Australian Legislative Assembly for Toodyay
- In office 3 October 1911 – 22 March 1924
- Preceded by: Timothy Quinlan
- Succeeded by: John Lindsay
- Constituency: Toodyay

Personal details
- Born: 17 July 1866 Guildford, Western Australia, Australia
- Died: 15 June 1939 (aged 72) Kendenup, Western Australia, Australia
- Party: Liberal (to 1914); Country (after 1914)

Alfred Napoleon Piesse (17 July 1866 – 15 June 1939) was an Australian politician who served as a member of the Legislative Assembly of Western Australia from 1911 to 1924, representing the seat of Toodyay. He joined the Country Party upon its formation in 1914, and served as state deputy leader from 1915 to 1921, initially under Francis Willmott and then under Tom Harrison.

== Early life ==
Piesse was born in Guildford, Western Australia, to Elizabeth Ellen (née Oxley) and William Roper Piesse. Three of his brothers, Arnold, Charles, and Frederick Piesse, were also members of parliament. After leaving school, Piesse initially worked as a post office messenger, and then joined the Telegraph Department. As a telegraphist, he worked in various remote locations in Western Australia, including Esperance, Eucla (on the border with South Australia), Bremer Bay, and Israelite Bay. Piesse left the Telegraph Department and moved to Toodyay in 1894, working variously as a court clerk, magistrate, and tax collector. He was elected to the Toodyay Road Board in 1907, and served as its chairman from 1907 to 1912.

== Politics and later life ==
Piesse entered parliament at the 1911 state election, defeating the sitting Speaker of the Legislative Assembly, Timothy Quinlan, in the seat of Toodyay. Elected as a member of the Liberal Party, he joined the Country Party upon its formation in 1914, and became one of its first members in parliament. In March 1915, Piesse was elected deputy leader of the party, at the same time as Francis Willmott was elected leader. He remained deputy leader under Tom Harrison, who replaced Willmott in July 1919, but in May 1921 was replaced by Alec Thomson, instead becoming party whip.

The Country Party split into two rival factions in 1923, with Piesse joining the Ministerial faction (comprising supporters of the coalition with the Nationalist Party). However, at the 1924 state election, he was defeated by John Lindsay, a member of the opposing Executive faction of the party. A few months after his defeat in Toodyay, Piesse stood for election to the Legislative Council, but was again defeated, losing to Hector Stewart in South-East Province.

He eventually retired to Kendenup, a small town in the Great Southern. He died there in June 1939, aged 72. A nephew, Harold, was also a member of parliament in Western Australia and a second nephew, Edmund Piesse was a Senator for Western Australia.

== See also ==
- Members of the Western Australian Legislative Assembly
