= Gilbert Fraser =

Australian politician

Gilbert Fraser (22 July 1894 – 1 November 1958) was an Australian politician, postmaster and World War II telegraphist. He was a Labor Party member in the Western Australian Legislative Council from 1928 to 1958, representing West Province. He served as Chief Secretary and Minister for Local Government and Town Planning from 1953 to 1958, and was Leader of the Government in the Legislative Council from 1955 to 1958.

== Personal life ==
Gilbert Fraser was born on 22 July 1894 in Bunbury, Western Australia. His parents were Edmund Fraser, a contractor, and Ellen Maud Walsh, both born and raised in Victoria. He was Catholic. His father died in Geraldton, Western Australia on 14 August 1895 and his mother then moved the family to Victoria to be close to family support, Fraser was educated at Marist Brothers College, Bendigo. Fraser returned to Western Australia in 1910.

Fraser married Mary Alice Williams on 7 October 1914 at St Anne's Church, Fremantle. They had three sons and one daughter. In 1915 he was living in North Fremantle.

Fraser was a president of the North Fremantle Football Club, from 1932 to 1958, except for five years during World War II. The home ground for the football club was named Gilbert Fraser Reserve and Grandstand in his honour.

In 1957 he was affected by throat cancer. Fraser died on 1 November 1958 at Fremantle Hospital in Western Australia.

== Career ==
Fraser joined the Postmaster-General's Department in Eaglehawk, Victoria in 1909. In 1915 he was a letter carrier stationed with Postmaster-General at Fremantle, and continued to work there until 1928.

Fraser was the Labor candidate elected to the Western Australian Legislative Council for the West Province, from 22 May 1928 to 1 November 1958. At this time, at 33 years of age, he was the youngest member to enter any legislative assembly in Australia. He was deputy chairman of committees from 1936 to 1952. He was a member of the Royal Commission inquiring into the Electoral Act 1935, and Royal Commission inquiring into the Companies Bill in 1941.

From 1941 to 1945, during World War II, Fraser was a telegraphist for the Royal Australian Air Force.

In 1950 Fraser represented the Western Australia branch of the Commonwealth Parliamentary Association at the General Conference in Wellington, New Zealand. In 1951 to 1952 he was a member of the Royal Commission inquiring into the Town Planning and Development Act Amendment Bill. He was Chief Secretary, Minister for Local Government and Town Planning from 23 February 1953 to 1 November 1958, and Leader of the Government in the Legislative Council from 7 December 1955 to 1 November 1958. He was Father of the House, as longest serving member in the house, from May 1954 to his death in November 1958. In 1957 he used an amplifier in Parliament due to throat cancer.
