= Debt adjustment =

Form of debt relief

Debt adjustment is a form of debt relief that allows a government, organization, corporation, or individual to repay a debt over a longer period of time and with smaller payment amounts than the lender and borrower originally agreed upon. It is an alternative to bankruptcy. Debt settlement is a form of individual debt adjustment.

In the United States, law firms point out that Chapter 13 Individual Debt Adjustment is much less expensive and complicated than Chapter 11 Reorganization.
