= Crawford Nalder =

Australian politician

The Honourable Sir Crawford Nalder

Deputy Premier of Western Australia
- In office 1 February 1962 – 3 March 1971
- Premier: Sir David Brand
- Preceded by: Arthur Watts
- Succeeded by: Herb Graham

Leader of the Country Party in Western Australia
- In office 1 February 1962 – 17 July 1973
- Preceded by: Arthur Watts
- Succeeded by: Ray McPharlin

Member of the Legislative Assembly of Western Australia
- In office 15 March 1947 – 25 March 1950
- Preceded by: Sydney Stubbs
- Succeeded by: None (abolished)
- Constituency: Wagin
- In office 25 March 1950 – 30 March 1974
- Preceded by: Arthur Watts
- Succeeded by: Dick Old
- Constituency: Katanning

Personal details
- Born: 14 February 1910 Katanning, Western Australia
- Died: 8 December 1994 (aged 84) Bentley, Western Australia
- Party: Country Party

Sir Crawford David Nalder (14 February 1910 – 8 December 1994) was an Australian politician who served as Deputy Premier of Western Australia from 1962 to 1971. He was leader of the Country Party in Western Australia from 1962 to 1973.

Nalder was born in Katanning, Western Australia. A farmer, he was elected to Legislative Assembly at the 1947 state election, winning the seat of Wagin. He switched to the seat of Katanning at the 1950 election. Having served as the party's deputy leader since 1956, Nalder replaced Arthur Watts as leader of the Country Party in 1962. He maintained the existing coalition with the Liberal Party (led by David Brand), with the Brand government eventually being defeated at the 1971 election. Nalder retired from parliament in 1974 and was knighted later that year.

== Early life ==
Nalder was born in Katanning, a small town in Western Australia's Great Southern region, to Janet (née Painter) and Henry Arthur Nalder. He received his early education from state schools in Colanilling, Ballaying, and Bonnie Doon, but boarded at Wesley College, Perth, for his final two years of schooling. After graduating in 1925, Nalder returned to the country, farming at Wagin. From 1932, he served as a lay preacher in the Methodist Church. In October 1936, whilst travelling on the Perth–Wagin Road with two of his brothers, he received a severe concussion after their truck overturned. During World War II, Nalder enlisted in the Australian Army, serving as a private in the 10th Battalion Volunteer Defence Corps.

== Politics ==
A long-time member of the Country Party, Nalder stood for the Legislative Assembly seat of Wagin in the 1947 state elections, and was elected over two other Country Party candidates and one Labor Party candidate. The electoral district of Wagin was abolished in a redistribution prior to the 1950 state elections, and Nalder successfully contested Katanning, which had been vacated following the decision of Arthur Watts, the leader of the party, to move to Stirling. He would hold Katanning until his retirement in 1974, on occasion being re-elected unopposed.

Following Labor's defeat in the 1959 state elections, Nalder was named Minister for Agriculture in the Brand–Watts Ministry, a position he held from 2 April 1959 through to 3 March 1971. From 12 April 1962, he was also Minister for Electricity. Nalder had been elected deputy leader of the Country Party in 1956, replacing Lindsay Thorn, and on Watts' retirement in February 1962, succeeded him as the party's leader (and deputy premier to David Brand). He remained a member of cabinet in the reconstituted Brand–Nalder Ministry until the defeat of the Liberal–Country coalition at the 1971 election, and continued in parliament until the 1974 election.

== Later life ==
On 15 June 1974, following his retirement, Nalder was created a Knight Bachelor. He eventually retired to Bentley (a suburb of Perth), dying there in December 1994 (aged 84). Nalder's son, Cambell Nalder, served as member for Narrogin from 1986 until his death the following year, and a grandson, Dean Nalder, was elected as the Liberal Party member for Alfred Cove, and later member for Bateman. A granddaughter, Karen Middleton, is the chief political correspondent for The Saturday Paper covering federal politics in the Canberra Press Gallery.

Political offices
| Preceded by Lionel Kelly | Minister for Agriculture; 1959–1971 | Succeeded by David Evans |
| Preceded by Arthur Watts | Deputy Premier of Western Australia; 1962–1971 | Succeeded by Herb Graham |
| Preceded by Edgar Lewis | Minister for Electricity; 1962–1971 | Succeeded by Colin Jamieson |
Party political offices
| Preceded by Arthur Watts | Leader of the Country Party of Western Australia; 1962–1973 | Succeeded by Ray McPharlin |
