= James Craig (Australian politician) =

Australian politician

The Honourable James Craig

Member of the Legislative Assembly of Western Australia
- In office 21 March 1959 – 20 February 1971
- Preceded by: Lindsay Thorn
- Succeeded by: James Moiler
- Constituency: Toodyay

Personal details
- Born: 22 December 1911 Kalgoorlie, Western Australia
- Died: 12 January 1989 (aged 77) Nedlands, Western Australia
- Party: Country

James Frederick Craig (22 December 1911 – 12 January 1989) was an Australian farmer and politician who was a Country Party member of the Legislative Assembly of Western Australia from 1959 to 1971, representing the seat of Toodyay. He served as a minister in the government of Sir David Brand.

Craig was born in Kalgoorlie to Hilda Dagma (née Thornton) and James Burnett Craig. He attended Scotch College, Perth, and then found work as a clerk with Western Australian Government Railways, working at Welshpool. Craig enlisted in the Australian Army in 1939, and saw active duty in the Middle Eastern theatre. He initially returned to the railways after being discharged in 1942, and then from 1947 served as secretary and accountant for a cooperative based in the Swan Valley. From 1951 to 1952, he was also a member of the Midland Junction Town Council.

Craig entered parliament at the 1959 state election, replacing the retiring Lindsay Thorn. After the 1962 election, he was elevated to the ministry, replacing George Cornell as Minister for Transport and Minister for Police. In a reshuffle after the 1965 election, Craig replaced Ross Hutchinson as Chief Secretary, although he lost the transport portfolio to Charles Court. He remained in the ministry until his retirement at the 1971 state election. Craig died in Perth in January 1989, aged 77. He had married Maria Rhoda Haynes in 1936, with whom he had three children.

Parliament of Western Australia
Preceded by Lindsay Thorn	Member for Toodyay; 1959–1971	Succeeded by James Moiler
Political offices
Preceded by George Cornell	Minister for Police; 1962–1971	Succeeded by Jerry Dolan
Preceded by George Cornell	Minister for Transport; 1962–1965	Succeeded by Charles Court
Preceded by Ross Hutchinson	Chief Secretary; 1965–1971	Succeeded by Claude Stubbs
