= Independent National (Australia) =

- Local government (NSW): 37 / 1,480
- Local government (Vic): 5 / 618

Independent National (formerly Independent Country) is a description used in Australian politics, often to designate a politician who is a National Party of Australia member but not endorsed by the party at elections or if sitting in a parliament, not a member of the National party room caucus.

The National Party began as the Australian Country Party in 1920 at a federal level, before being renamed to the National Country Party in 1975, and later adopting its current name in 1982.

== History ==
Frederick Warner was elected to the Western Australian Legislative Assembly as an Independent Country candidate in 1933, defeating sitting Country MP John Lindsay. He later sought (and received) Country Party endorsement for the 1936 election, and was re-elected with an increased majority.

Other Independent Country MPs in Western Australia included Lionel Kelly and Ray Owen, both elected at separate by-elections.

The first federal Independent Country MP was Alexander Wilson, a member of the Victorian state branch of the Country Party who was first elected in 1937. He was opposed to the Coalition with the United Australia Party, and later played a key role in the downfall of the Fadden government in 1941.

Tony Crook, a member of the Western Australian National Party, described himself as an independent and chose to sit on the crossbench after being elected as the member for O'Connor at the 2010 federal election.

Following Peter Dutton's unsuccessful attempt to oust Malcolm Turnbull as leader of the Liberal Party and Prime Minister, federal Nationals MP Kevin Hogan announced that he would move to the crossbench if the Liberals called for another spill before the next election. He made good on his promise on 24 August, when Turnbull resigned the leadership rather than face a second spill, which resulted in Scott Morrison becoming prime minister. Hogan called himself an Independent National and sat on the crossbench, before later returning to the Coalition benches on 21 May 2019, three days after being re-elected as a National at the federal election.

== Similar political descriptions ==
Australian politicians have also been elected under other independent labels, including Independent Labor, Independent Liberal, Independent Free Trade, Independent UAP and Independent Socialist.

== See also ==
- Independent politicians in Australia
