= Frederick Henry Piesse =

Farmer, businessman and politician of Western Australia

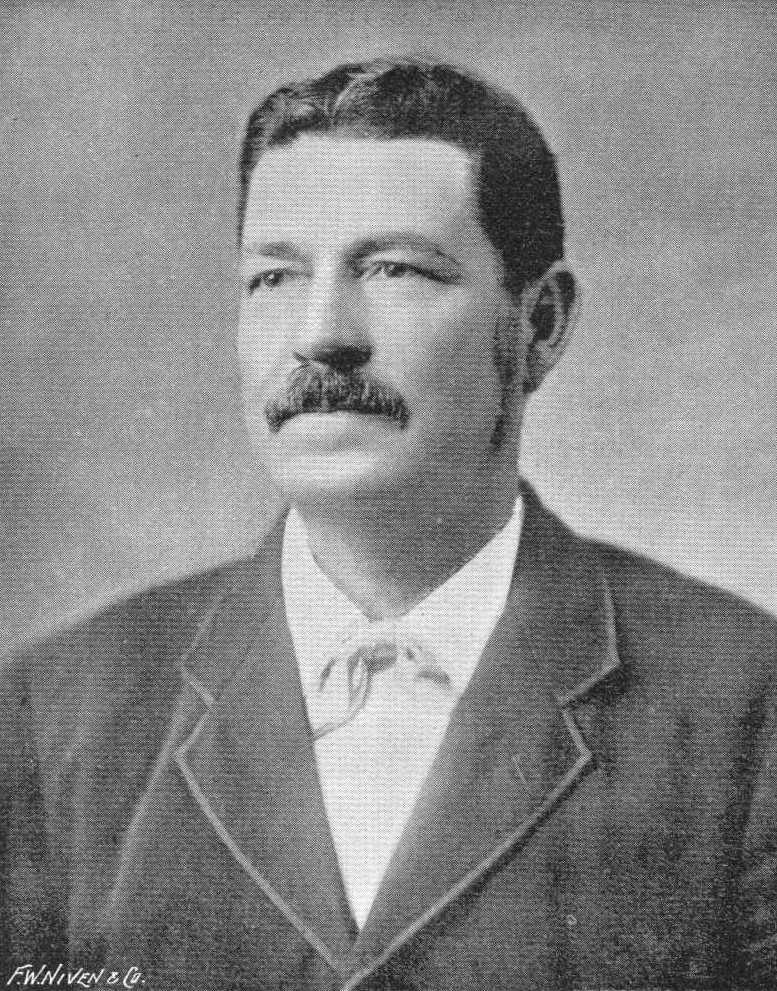
Frederick Henry Piesse

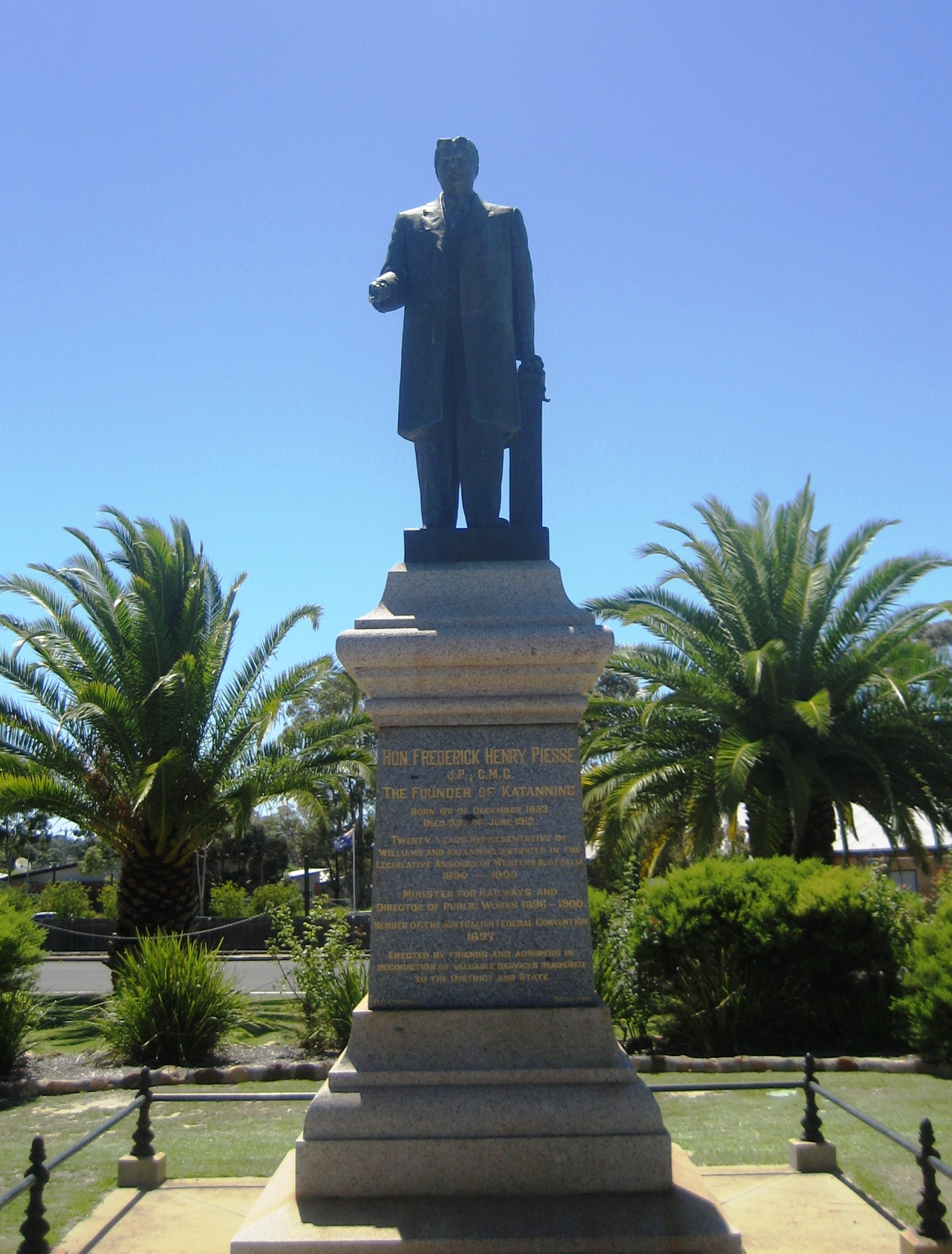
Statue in Katanning

Frederick Henry Piesse, CMG (6 December 1853 – 29 June 1912) was a farmer, businessman and politician who is credited with much of the early development of the region around Katanning, Western Australia.

Piesse was born at Northam, Western Australia, on 6 December 1853. The son of policeman and magistrate William Roper Piesse and Elizabeth Ellen née Oxley, among his brothers were Alfred, Arnold and Charles Piesse, all of whom followed Frederick into politics. Piesse was educated at state schools at Guildford and Northam, and began his working life at the Northam general store. Later he went pearl fishing at Shark Bay between 1872 and 1875. He was postmaster and telegraphist at Williams between 1875 and 1880. On 18 October 1877 he married Mary Jane Elizabeth Chipper, with whom he had four sons and a daughter.

In 1880, Piesse partnered with his brother Charles to launch the general produce firm of F. & C. Piesse at Williams. He set up a portable store in 1886, and followed the progress of the Great Southern Railway, finishing up at Katanning. He then bought agricultural land near the railway and in 1891 built a flour mill in Katanning. He established a wine industry, making wines that won awards in Perth, London and Paris. An 1892 newspaper article described in detail a 9.7-hectare (24-acre) orchard Piesse had created near to the township of Katanning which contained 2300 trees.

From 1880 onwards, Piesse became increasingly involved in public affairs. He was a member of the Williams Road Board from 1880 to 1889, and its chairman from 1886. In 1889 he became a Justice of the Peace, and from 1889 to 1896 he was on the Katanning Road Board. From January 1894 to June 1896 he was also a member of the Board of Agriculture.

At the 1890 election, Piesse was elected to the Western Australian Legislative Assembly seat of Williams, becoming a member of the first Parliament of Western Australia under responsible government. From 1 April 1896 to 23 August 1900, he was Commissioner for Railways and Director of Public Works in the Forrest Ministry. He was a Western Australian delegate to the Federal Convention of 1897, and for a period in 1900 he was Acting Premier of Western Australia. During George Leake's first premiership from June to November 1901, Piesse was Leader of the Opposition.

In the 1904 election, Piesse stood for and won the new seat of Katanning. He held the seat until his resignation on 26 October 1909. For his last four years in parliament he was Father of the House. Piesse was made a CMG in 1907.

He died at Katanning on 29 June 1912 (aged 58), and was buried in Katanning Cemetery.

A son, Harold, was a member of the Western Australian Legislative Council, while a nephew, Edmund Piesse was a Senator for Western Australia.

Western Australian Legislative Assembly
New assembly	Member for Williams; 1890–1904	Succeeded by Frank Cowcher
New district	Member for Katanning; 1904–1909	Succeeded by Arnold Piesse
