= Frederick Warner (politician) =

Australian politician

Frederick Warner MM

Member of the Legislative Assembly of Western Australia
- In office 8 April 1933 – 20 November 1943
- Preceded by: John Lindsay
- Succeeded by: Hugh Leslie
- Constituency: Mount Marshall

Personal details
- Born: 4 December 1875 Foster, Victoria, Australia
- Died: 17 January 1952 (aged 76) Rockingham, Western Australia, Australia
- Party: Country (from 1936)
- Other political affiliations: Independent (to 1936)

Frederick Lytton Warner, MM (4 December 1875 – 17 January 1952) was an Australian politician who served as a Country Party member of the Legislative Assembly of Western Australia from 1933 to 1943, representing the seat of Mount Marshall.

Warner was born in Foster, Victoria, to Diana (née Tippett) and Gustavus Meredith Warner. He arrived in Western Australia in 1895, initially worked as a labourer and then in 1900 joining the Western Australia Police. Warner spent periods as a police constable in Perth, Guildford, Maylands, and Marble Bar. He joined the Australian Imperial Force in 1916, and served in France with the 44th Battalion. Warner was awarded the Military Medal in 1918, for helping capture enemy machine guns. He was discharged in 1919 and rejoined the police force.

In 1922, Warner began farming at Nungarin, a small Wheatbelt locality. He became prominent in local agricultural circles, and at the 1933 state election was elected to parliament as an Independent Country candidate, defeating John Lindsay (the sitting Country Party member) in Mount Marshall. Warner sought (and received) Country Party endorsement for the 1936 election, and was re-elected with an increased majority. He was again re-elected in 1939, but did not recontest his seat at the 1943 election. Warner retired to Perth, dying there in January 1952 (aged 76). He had married Emma Kirby in 1897, with whom he had seven children.
