= Lindsay Thorn =

Australian politician

The Honourable Lindsay Thorn

Deputy Leader of the Country Party in Western Australia
- In office December 1943 – March 1956
- Leader: Arthur Watts
- Preceded by: William Patrick
- Succeeded by: Crawford Nalder

Member of the Legislative Assembly of Western Australia
- In office 12 April 1930 – 21 March 1959
- Preceded by: John Lindsay
- Succeeded by: James Craig
- Constituency: Toodyay

Personal details
- Born: 7 June 1891 York, Western Australia, Australia
- Died: 13 July 1971 (aged 80) Bicton, Western Australia, Australia
- Party: Country

Lindsay Thorn (7 June 1891 – 13 July 1971) was an Australian politician who was a Country Party member of the Legislative Assembly of Western Australia from 1930 to 1959, representing the seat of Toodyay. He was a minister in the government of Sir Ross McLarty.

== Early life ==
Thorn was born in York, Western Australia, to Isabella (née Blakiston) and Thomas Henry Thorn. His parents moved to Fremantle when he was a child, where he attended the Fremantle Boys' School. Thorn enlisted in the Australian Imperial Force in 1915, and during the war served in Egypt and France as a driver. He returned to Australia and settled in the Swan Valley, where he became involved with the local wine industry.

== Politics and later life ==
At the 1930 state election, Thorn was elected to the seat of Toodyay for the Country Party. He replaced John Lindsay, who had transferred to the seat of Mount Marshall. In December 1943, Thorn was elected deputy leader of the Country Party under Arthur Watts, replacing William Patrick. Following the Liberal–Country coalition's victory at the 1947 state election, he was elevated to the new coalition ministry as Minister for Lands, Minister for Agriculture, and Minister for Labour. He lost the agriculture portfolio to Hubert Parker in a reshuffle in January 1948, but in October 1949 regained a third title, becoming Minister for Immigration.

The McLarty government was defeated at the 1953 election, ending Thorn's time in the ministry. He nearly lost his seat at the 1956 state election, prevailing over an independent candidate by just 63 votes on the two-candidate-preferred count. Just before the election, Thorn had been replaced as deputy leader of the Country Party by Crawford Nalder. He retired from parliament at the 1959 election, with James Craig retaining his seat for the Country Party. Outside of politics, Thorn served for ten years on the state executive of the Returned Services League (RSL). He died in Perth in July 1971, aged 80. He had married twice, firstly to Sarah Olive Neilson, with whom he had four children. He was widowed in 1952, and remarried the following year to Jane Eliza Jones.

== See also ==
- Members of the Western Australian Legislative Assembly

Parliament of Western Australia
Preceded by John Lindsay	Member for Toodyay; 1930–1959	Succeeded by James Craig
Political offices
Preceded by Alexander Panton	Minister for Lands; 1947–1953	Succeeded by Ernest Hoar
Preceded by Alexander Panton	Minister for Labour; 1947–1953	Succeeded by Bill Hegney
Preceded by John Tonkin	Minister for Agriculture; 1947–1948	Succeeded by Garnet Wood
New creation	Minister for Immigration; 1949–1953	Abolished
