= 1933 Western Australian state election =

- 8 April 1933

All 50 seats in the Western Australian Legislative Assembly
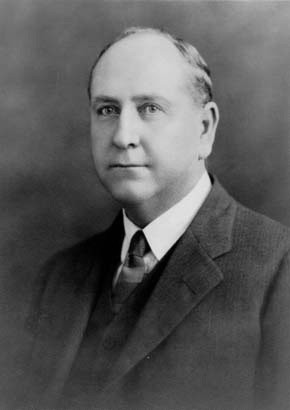

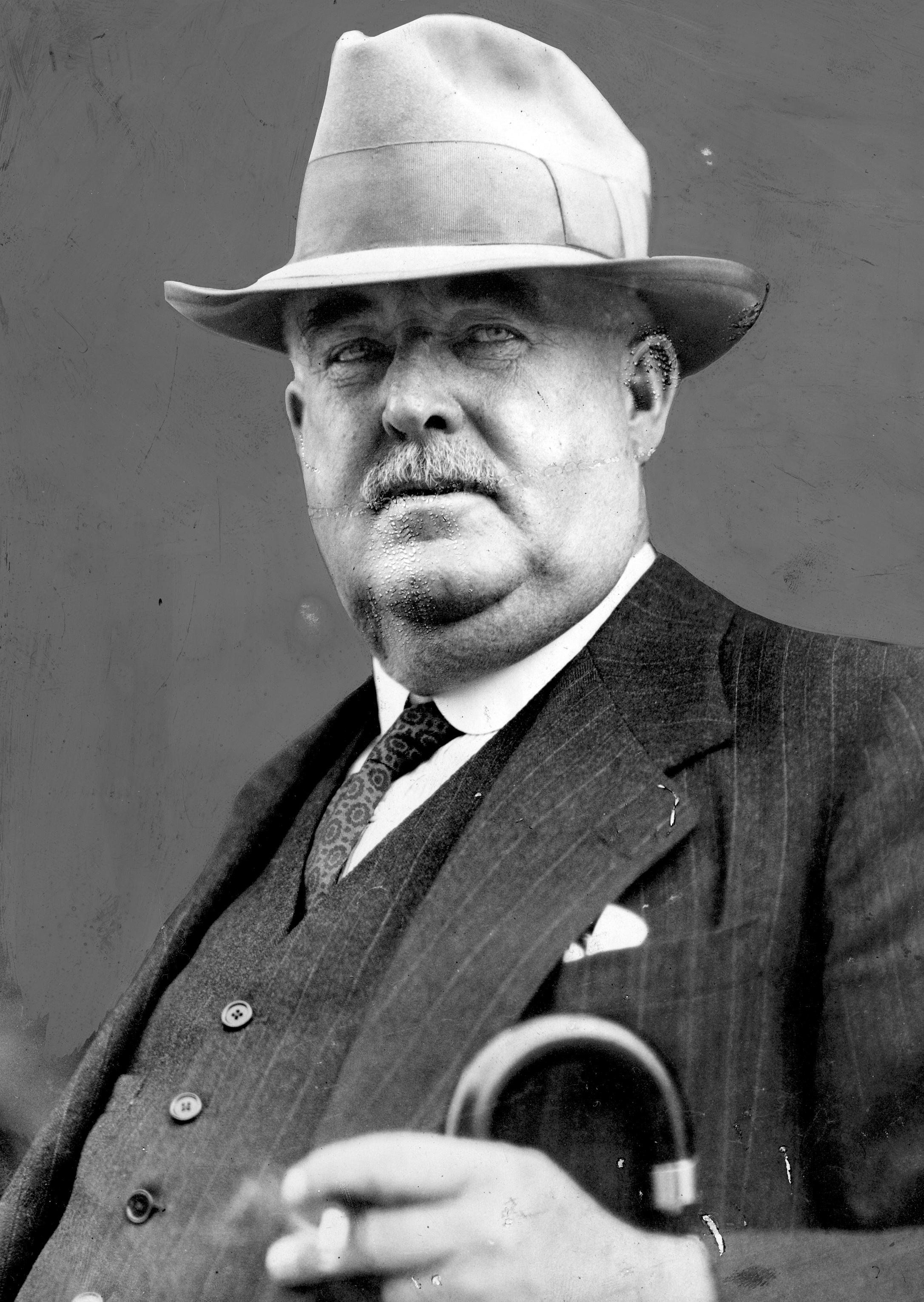
	First party	Second party
Leader	Philip Collier	James Mitchell
Party	Labor	Nationalist/Country coalition
Leader since	16 April 1917	17 May 1919
Leader's seat	Boulder	Northam (lost seat)
Last election	23 seats	27 seats
Seats won	30 seats	19 seats
Seat change	▲7	▼8
Percentage	45.48%	44.82%
Swing	▲7.08	▼10.13
Premier before election
James Mitchell
Nationalist/Country coalition
Elected Premier
Philip Collier
Labor

Elections were held in the state of Western Australia on 8 April 1933 to elect all 50 members to the Legislative Assembly. The one-term Nationalist-Country coalition government, led by Premier Sir James Mitchell, was defeated by the Labor Party, led by Opposition Leader Philip Collier.

The election occurred at the height of the Great Depression, and was notable for four reasons. Firstly, it is, to date, the only Western Australian election at which a sitting Premier has been defeated in his own seat, with Sir James Mitchell losing his Northam seat to Albert Hawke. It has also been the only election (apart from the ministerial by-elections in December 1901) where over half a Ministry have been defeated at an election—apart from Mitchell, Hubert Parker, John Scaddan and John Lindsay all lost their parliamentary seats. Secondly, three future Premiers, Frank Wise (1943–1945), Albert Hawke (1953–1959) and John Tonkin (1971–1974), were elected to Parliament on the same day. Thirdly, it was held on the same day as the secession referendum, which was passed by 68% of voters despite their choice of a party to lead the State who had persistently opposed secession. Finally, the Nationalists fell to third place at the election in terms of seats, meaning that the Country Party, who had more seats in parliament, were able to name the Opposition Leader until Labor's eventual defeat in the 1947 election. This result was in part possible due to the malapportionment in the Western Australian parliament which created more seats in mining areas, where the Labor Party was dominant, and in agricultural areas, where the Country Party was dominant.

Two changes of affiliation had occurred in the previous term, which resulted in the Country Party increasing their parliamentary strength in the Assembly to 12 members. Arnold Piesse, who as an independent had defeated former Country Party leader Alec Thomson in his Katanning seat at the 1930 election, joined the Country Party, as did Richard Sampson, the long-serving member for Swan who had been elected a Nationalist.

== Retiring members ==
- Edwin Corboy (Labor, Yilgarn-Coolgardie)
- Alfred Lamond (Labor, Pilbara)

At the time of the election, the seat of West Perth was vacant. Its previous member, former Attorney-General and Nationalist MLA Thomas Davy, died suddenly on 18 February 1933, aged 42, while playing bridge with his wife and two friends at the Savoy Hotel. He was succeeded at the election by Robert Ross McDonald, who went on to lead the Nationalist Party from 1938 and was instrumental in forming the Western Australian branch of the Liberal Party in 1945.

Also the seat of Pingelly was vacant, with its previous Country party member Henry Brown dying of a cerebral haemorrhage on 11 February 1933.

== Results ==
At the election, 10 sitting members were defeated—nine Nationalists and one Country member. 8 of these seats were won by Labor, while Sussex was won by fellow Nationalist Edmund Brockman, and in Mount Marshall, Independent candidate Frederick Warner defeated Country member and Minister John Lindsay. (Warner went on to join the Country Party.) The only loss to Labor was the seat of Pilbara, which had been vacated by retiring member Alfred Lamond, and was won by the Nationalists' Frank Welsh.

Western Australian state election, 8 April 1933 Legislative Assembly << 1930–1936 >>
Enrolled voters	205,312^{[1]}				
Votes cast	186,012		Turnout	90.60%	+16.15%
Informal votes	4,156		Informal	2.23%	+1.10%
Summary of votes by party
Party	Primary votes	%	Swing	Seats	Change
Labor	82,702	45.48%	+7.04%	30	+ 7
Nationalist	55,522	30.53%	–5.65%	8	– 7
Country	25,980	14.29%	–4.48%	11	– 1
Ind. Nat.	2,199	1.21%	+1.21%	0	± 0
Communist	442	0.25%	+0.25%	0	± 0
Independent	14,918	8.20%	–2.70%	1	+ 1
Total	186,012			50	

^{1} 237,197 electors were enrolled to vote at the election, but 9 of the 50 seats were uncontested—6 Labor seats representing 20,069 enrolled voters, 1 Nationalist seat representing 4,139 voters and 2 Country seats representing 7,677 voters.

== See also ==
- Candidates of the 1933 Western Australian state election
- Members of the Western Australian Legislative Assembly, 1930–1933
- Members of the Western Australian Legislative Assembly, 1933–1936
- Second Mitchell Ministry
- Second Collier Ministry
