= Electoral district of Toodyay =

Former electoral district of Western Australia

Toodyay Western Australia—Legislative Assembly
- State: Western Australia
- Dates current: 1890–1977
- Namesake: Toodyay

Toodyay was an electoral district of the Legislative Assembly in the Australian state of Western Australia from 1890 to 1977.

The district was based on the town of Toodyay lying to the north-east of Perth. It was one of the original 30 seats contested at the 1890 election.

The district was abolished at the 1977 election. Its last member, Mick Nanovich of the Liberal Party, went on to become the member for Whitford.

== Members ==
| Member | Party | Term |
|---|---|---|
| Barnard Clarkson | Non-aligned | 1890–1897 |
| Timothy Quinlan | Ministerial | 1897–1911 |
| Alfred Piesse | Liberal | 1911–1914 |
| Alfred Piesse | Country | 1914–1923 |
| Alfred Piesse | Country (MCP) | 1923–1924 |
| John Lindsay | Country (ECP) | 1924 |
| John Lindsay | Country | 1924–1930 |
| Lindsay Thorn | Country | 1930–1959 |
| James Craig | Country | 1959–1971 |
| James Moiler | Labor | 1971–1974 |
| Mick Nanovich | Liberal | 1974–1977 |
