= John Lindsay (Western Australian politician) =

Western Australian politician

Member of the Legislative Assembly of Western Australia
- In office 22 March 1924 – 12 April 1930
- Preceded by: Alfred Piesse
- Succeeded by: Lindsay Thorn
- Constituency: Toodyay
- In office 12 April 1930 – 8 April 1933
- Preceded by: None (new seat)
- Succeeded by: Frederick Warner
- Constituency: Mount Marshall

Personal details
- Born: 6 January 1876 Glasgow, Scotland
- Died: 12 December 1957 (aged 81) Claremont, Western Australia, Australia
- Party: Country

John Lindsay (6 January 1876 – 12 December 1957) was an Australian politician who served as a Country Party member of the Legislative Assembly of Western Australia from 1924 to 1933. He was a minister in the government of Sir James Mitchell.

== Early life ==
Lindsay was born in Glasgow, Scotland, to Sarah (née Gillies) and William Lindsay. He arrived in Western Australia as a young man, having earlier spent two years in Queensland. During the Boer War, Lindsay served two tours of duty with a Western Australian regiment. He was refused permission to re-enlist after his first tour of duty, but supposedly stowed away on a troop ship and talked his way into continuing to serve. After the war's end, Lindsay did not return to Australia until 1905, when he took up land at Wyalkatchem as one of the region's first settlers. He was elected to the Dowerin Road Board in 1912, and then switched to the Wyalkatchem Road Board upon its creation in 1920.

== Politics and later life ==
Lindsay entered parliament at the 1924 state election, winning the seat of Toodyay from the sitting Country member, Alfred Piesse. He and Piesse belonged to separate factions of the party, which had split in 1923 due to disputes over the coalition with the Nationalist Party. Lindsay was re-elected to Toodyay with an increased majority at the 1927 election. He switched to the new seat of Mount Marshall at the 1930 election, which saw a victory for the Nationalist–Country coalition, and was subsequently appointed to cabinet as Minister for Public Works and Minister for Labour.

At the 1933 state election, both Lindsay and the Mitchell government were defeated. He was one of four government ministers to lose their seats (along with Mitchell, John Scaddan, and Hubert Parker), although his defeat was to an "Independent Country" candidate, Frederick Warner. Lindsay stood for East Province at the 1936 Legislative Council election, but was defeated by Garnet Wood. He made one final run for parliament at the 1943 state election, but lost to Hugh Leslie. Lindsay retired to Perth, dying there in 1957, aged 81. He had married Annie Sherwood in 1911, with whom he had four children.

== See also ==
- Second Mitchell Ministry

Parliament of Western Australia
Preceded by Alfred Piesse	Member for Toodyay; 1927–1930	Succeeded by Lindsay Thorn
New seat	Member for Mount Marshall; 1930–1933	Succeeded by Frederick Warner
Political offices
Preceded by Alick McCallum	Minister for Public Works; 1930–1933	Succeeded by Alick McCallum
New creation	Minister for Labour; 1930–1933	Succeeded by Alick McCallum
