= Arnold Piesse =

Australian politician

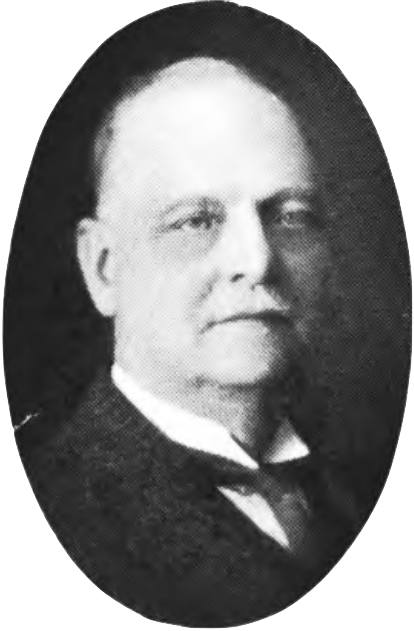

Member of the Legislative Assembly of Western Australia
- In office 4 November 1909 – 21 October 1914
- Preceded by: Frederick Piesse
- Succeeded by: Alec Thomson
- Constituency: Katanning
- In office 12 April 1930 – 21 July 1935
- Preceded by: Alec Thomson
- Succeeded by: Arthur Watts
- Constituency: Katanning

Personal details
- Born: 2 April 1872 Guildford, Western Australia, Australia
- Died: 21 July 1935 (aged 63) At sea between Fremantle and Cape Town
- Party: Liberal (1911–1914); Country (from 1930)

Arnold Edmund Piesse (2 April 1872 – 21 July 1935) was an Australian politician who served as a member of the Legislative Assembly of Western Australia from 1909 to 1914 and again from 1930 until his death, on both occasions representing the seat of Katanning.

Piesse was born in Guildford, Western Australia, to Elizabeth Ellen (née Oxley) and William Roper Piesse. Three of his brothers, Alfred, Charles, and Frederick Piesse, were also members of parliament. After leaving school, Piesse worked in Northam for five years, employed by the merchant firm of George Throssell (a future premier). He then joined two of his brothers (Charles and Frederick) in business at Katanning, eventually taking over the company. Piesse was eventually elected to the Katanning Road Board, and served as its chairman for a period. He first entered parliament in November 1909, winning the seat of Katanning unopposed at the by-election caused by the resignation of his brother Frederick. He was re-elected at the 1911 state election, standing for the Liberal Party, but after a period of ill health chose not to re-contest his seat at the 1914 election. After leaving parliament, Piesse went to England on a health trip, and did not return to Australia until 1925.

Standing as an unendorsed Country Party candidate, Piesse re-entered parliament at the 1930 state election, defeating Alec Thomson (the sitting Country Party leader who had been Piesse's successor in 1914). He was re-elected at the 1933 election, but died in office in July 1935 (aged 63). He had left for a health trip to England in February of that year, and on the Cape Town–Fremantle leg of the return journey killed himself by jumping overboard. His daughter had died suddenly while he was away, and it was thought that this news might have been a factor in his own death.

Piesse had been married twice, firstly to Margaret Mary Chipper in 1897, with whom he had three children. He was widowed in 1902, and remarried in 1904 to Lille Johnston, with whom he had another two children. One of his sons, Edmund Piesse, became a Country Party senator, but like his father, killed himself while in office. A nephew, Harold, was also a member of parliament in Western Australia.
