= Arthur Watts (politician) =

Australian politician

The Honourable Arthur Watts CMG MLA
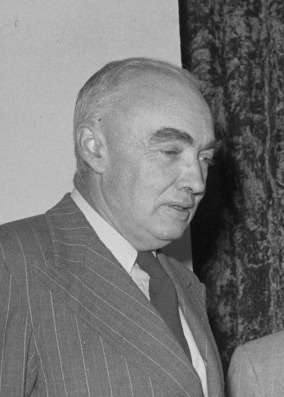
- Watts in 1950

Deputy Premier of Western Australia
- In office 1 April 1947 – 23 February 1953
- Preceded by: Albert Hawke
- Succeeded by: John Tonkin
- In office 2 April 1959 – 1 February 1962
- Preceded by: John Tonkin
- Succeeded by: Crawford Nalder

Leader of the Opposition of Western Australia
- In office 8 October 1942 – 1 April 1947
- Preceded by: Charles Latham
- Succeeded by: Frank Wise

Member of the Western Australian Parliament for Katanning
- In office 31 August 1935 – 25 March 1950
- Preceded by: Arnold Piesse
- Succeeded by: Crawford Nalder

Member of the Western Australian Parliament for Stirling
- In office 25 March 1950 – 31 March 1962
- Preceded by: New constituency
- Succeeded by: Clayton Mitchell

Personal details
- Born: 26 May 1897 London, England
- Died: 8 June 1970 (aged 73) Dalkeith, Western Australia
- Party: Country Party (Note: Throughout his life, Watts was a member of what is now the National Party of Western Australia, the state branch of the National Party. In Western Australia, the party was variously known as the Country and Democratic League from 1946 to 1962, the Country Party from 1962 to 1973 (and prior to 1946), the National Alliance from 1973 to 1974, and the National Country Party from 1974 to 1985.)

Arthur Frederick Watts CMG (26 May 1897 – 8 June 1970) was an Australian politician who served in the Western Australian Legislative Assembly from 1935 to 1962, including as leader of the opposition (from 1942 to 1947) and deputy premier (from 1947 to 1953 and 1959 to 1962) of Western Australia.

Born in London, Watts emigrated to Perth with his family in 1906, later moving to Katanning. Having boarded at Guildford Grammar School, he was admitted to the Supreme Court of Western Australia in 1920 as a barrister and solicitor. Watts was elected to parliament for the Country Party at a 1935 by-election, necessitated by the death of Arnold Piesse. He succeeded Charles Latham as leader of the Country Party and leader of the opposition in 1942, and was made deputy premier to Ross McLarty following the 1947 state election.

Despite being Opposition leader, Watts did not become Premier with the change of government at the 1947 election as his party the Country Party won one less seat than its Coalition partner the Liberals resulting in Liberal leader McLarty becoming Premier instead.

It is one instance of an Opposition Leader who did not become Premier with an election producing a change of government.

The government was defeated at the 1953 election, but was re-elected at the six years, with Watts again serving as deputy premier under David Brand. He resigned as deputy premier in February 1962, and did not contest the state election the following month, having been appointed chairman of the State Licensing Courts. Watts died in Perth in June 1970.
