= Electoral district of Katanning =

Former electoral district of Western Australia

Katanning Western Australia—Legislative Assembly
- State: Western Australia
- Dates current: 1904–1989^{1}
- Namesake: Katanning

Footnotes
- ^{1} known as Katanning-Roe 1983–1989

Katanning was an electoral district of the Legislative Assembly in the Australian state of Western Australia from 1904 to 1989.

The district centred on the town of Katanning in the southern part of the state. The seat was a conservative electorate; it was never won by the Labor Party.

The district was known as Katanning-Roe from 1983, before it was finally abolished in 1989.

== Members ==
Katanning (1904–1983)
Member	Party	Term
Frederick Piesse	Independent	1904–1905
Frederick Piesse	Ministerial	1905–1909
Arnold Piesse	Ministerial	1909–1911
Arnold Piesse	Liberal	1911–1914
Alec Thomson	Liberal	1914–1917
Alec Thomson	Country	1917–1923
Alec Thomson	Country (ECP)	1923–1924
Alec Thomson	Country	1924–1930
Arnold Piesse	Ind. Country	1930–1933
Arnold Piesse	Country	1933–1935
Arthur Watts	Country	1935–1950
Crawford Nalder	Country	1950–1974
Dick Old	National Country	1974–1983
Katanning-Roe (1983–1989)
Member	Party	Term
Dick Old	National Country	1983–1985
Dick Old	Liberal	1985–1986
Monty House	National	1986–1989
