= Electoral results for the district of Scarborough =

Electoral district in Perth, Western Australia

This is a list of electoral results for the electoral district of Scarborough in Western Australian state elections.

== Members for Scarborough ==
Scarborough (1974–1996)
Member	Party	Term
Ray Young	Liberal	1974–1983
Graham Burkett	Labor	1983–1989
George Strickland	Liberal	1989–1996
Scarborough (2008–present)
Liza Harvey	Liberal	2008–2021
Stuart Aubrey	Labor	2021–present

== Election results ==
=== Elections in the 2020s ===
2025 Western Australian state election: Scarborough
Party	Candidate	Votes	%	±%
Labor	Stuart Aubrey	11,019	41.6	−7.5
Liberal	Damien Kelly	10,199	38.5	+2.9
Greens	Mark Twiss	3,270	12.4	+2.6
National	Elizabeth Re	1,254	4.7	+4.7
Animal Justice	Emily Stokes	725	2.7	+2.7
Total formal votes		26,467	97.0	−0.1
Informal votes		819	3.0	+0.1
Turnout		27,286	86.0	+4.2
Two-party-preferred result
Labor	Stuart Aubrey	14,563	55.0	−4.5
Liberal	Damien Kelly	11,897	45.0	+4.5
Labor hold		Swing	−4.5	

2021 Western Australian state election: Scarborough
Party	Candidate	Votes	%	±%
Labor	Stuart Aubrey	12,750	50.3	+20.7
Liberal	Liza Harvey	8,808	34.7	−13.0
Greens	SP Becker	2,331	9.2	−4.8
No Mandatory Vaccination	Vanya Markovina	498	2.0	+2.0
Independent	Dave Vos	337	1.3	+1.3
Western Australia	Troy Coward	300	1.2	+0.0
Liberals for Climate	Daniel Bridgewater	213	0.8	+0.8
WAxit	Johnny Boccardi	125	0.5	−0.9
Total formal votes		25,362	97.0	+1.0
Informal votes		771	3.0	−1.0
Turnout		26,133	84.4	+7.0
Two-party-preferred result
Labor	Stuart Aubrey	15,315	60.4	+16.1
Liberal	Liza Harvey	10,039	39.6	−16.1
Labor gain from Liberal		Swing	+16.1	

=== Elections in the 2010s ===
2017 Western Australian state election: Scarborough
Party	Candidate	Votes	%	±%
Liberal	Liza Harvey	10,829	47.6	−14.2
Labor	Tony Walker	6,668	29.3	+4.8
Greens	Judith Cullity	3,311	14.6	+3.4
One Nation	Margaret Dodd	910	4.0	+4.0
Christians	Kevin Host	430	1.9	−0.5
Micro Business	Dan Bailey	307	1.4	+1.4
Matheson for WA	Steven Pynt	278	1.2	+1.2
Total formal votes		22,733	96.1	+1.4
Informal votes		930	3.9	−1.4
Turnout		23,663	84.8	−0.2
Two-party-preferred result
Liberal	Liza Harvey	12,629	55.6	−11.7
Labor	Tony Walker	10,100	44.4	+11.7
Liberal hold		Swing	−11.7	

2013 Western Australian state election: Scarborough
Party	Candidate	Votes	%	±%
Liberal	Liza Harvey	12,681	61.8	+17.7
Labor	Eddie Lennie	5,036	24.6	–5.8
Greens	Judith Cullity	2,294	11.2	–1.4
Christians	Bruce Olsen	495	2.4	+0.3
Total formal votes		20,506	94.7	−0.5
Informal votes		1,156	5.3	+0.5
Turnout		21,662	87.8	
Two-party-preferred result
Liberal	Liza Harvey	13,792	67.3	+12.1
Labor	Eddie Lennie	6,705	32.7	–12.1
Liberal hold		Swing	+12.1	

=== Elections in the 2000s ===
2008 Western Australian state election: Scarborough
Party	Candidate	Votes	%	±%
Liberal	Liza Harvey	8,374	44.9	+14.2
Labor	Scott Blackwell	5,622	30.1	−2.3
Greens	Sonja Lundie-Jenkins	2,338	12.5	+1.9
Independent	Elizabeth Re	1,707	9.1	+9.1
Christian Democrats	Jennifer Whately	400	2.1	−1.4
Family First	Jim McCourt	223	1.2	+1.2
Total formal votes		18,664	95.0	−0.6
Informal votes		972	5.0	+0.6
Turnout		19,636	83.8	
Two-party-preferred result
Liberal	Liza Harvey	10,290	55.2	+2.6
Labor	Scott Blackwell	8,360	44.8	−2.6
Liberal hold		Swing	+2.6	

=== Elections in the 1990s ===
1993 Western Australian state election: Scarborough
Party	Candidate	Votes	%	±%
Liberal	George Strickland	9,670	51.1	+6.5
Labor	Robyn Murphy	6,842	36.2	−5.7
Greens	Robert Tait	1,187	6.3	+6.3
Independent	Dean Economou	711	3.8	+3.8
Democrats	Gaenor Cranch	496	2.6	−2.2
Total formal votes		18,906	96.7	+2.2
Informal votes		637	3.3	−2.2
Turnout		19,543	93.6	+3.3
Two-party-preferred result
Liberal	George Strickland	10,627	56.2	+4.6
Labor	Robyn Murphy	8,279	43.8	−4.6
Liberal hold		Swing	+4.6	

=== Elections in the 1980s ===
1989 Western Australian state election: Scarborough
Party	Candidate	Votes	%	±%
Liberal	George Strickland	8,437	44.6	+4.6
Labor	Graham Burkett	7,917	41.9	−11.3
Grey Power	Eugene Hands	1,034	5.5	+5.5
Democrats	Gaenor Cranch	915	4.8	+1.6
Independent	Peter Rose	604	3.2	+3.2
Total formal votes		18,907	94.5	
Informal votes		1,098	5.5	
Turnout		20,005	90.3	
Two-party-preferred result
Liberal	George Strickland	9,758	51.6	+8.2
Labor	Graham Burkett	9,149	48.4	−8.2
Liberal gain from Labor		Swing	+8.2	

1986 Western Australian state election: Scarborough
Party	Candidate	Votes	%	±%
Labor	Graham Burkett	8,846	55.9	+0.2
Liberal	Frances Grierson	5,642	35.7	−8.6
Independent	Barbara Churchward	691	4.4	+4.4
Democrats	Charles Hall	644	4.1	+4.1
Total formal votes		15,823	97.5	−0.5
Informal votes		410	2.5	+0.5
Turnout		16,233	90.9	+3.9
Two-party-preferred result
Labor	Graham Burkett	9,541	60.3	+4.6
Liberal	Frances Grierson	6,282	39.7	−4.6
Labor hold		Swing	+4.6	

1983 Western Australian state election: Scarborough
Party	Candidate	Votes	%	±%
Labor	Graham Burkett	8,053	55.7	
Liberal	Ray Young	6,416	44.3	
Total formal votes		14,469	98.0	
Informal votes		290	2.0	
Turnout		14,759	87.0	
Labor gain from Liberal		Swing		

1980 Western Australian state election: Scarborough
Party	Candidate	Votes	%	±%
Liberal	Ray Young	7,172	56.2	−0.4
Labor	Malcolm Hall	5,585	43.8	+0.4
Total formal votes		12,757	96.8	−0.4
Informal votes		426	3.2	+0.4
Turnout		13,183	87.8	−2.9
Liberal hold		Swing	−0.4	

=== Elections in the 1970s ===
1977 Western Australian state election: Scarborough
Party	Candidate	Votes	%	±%
Liberal	Ray Young	7,828	56.6	
Labor	Desmond Moore	5,989	43.4	
Total formal votes		13,817	97.2	
Informal votes		396	2.8	
Turnout		14,213	90.7	
Liberal hold		Swing		

1974 Western Australian state election: Scarborough
Party	Candidate	Votes	%	±%
Labor	Des Moore	6,629	46.9	
Liberal	Ray Young	6,442	45.6	
National Alliance	Adrian Briffa	1,070	7.6	
Total formal votes		14,141	96.8	
Informal votes		474	3.2	
Turnout		14,615	90.0	
Two-party-preferred result
Liberal	Ray Young	7,138	50.5	
Labor	Des Moore	7,003	49.5	
Liberal gain from Labor		Swing		
