= Electoral results for the district of Mount Lawley =

Western Australian district election results

This is a list of electoral results for the electoral district of Mount Lawley in Western Australian state elections.

== Members for Mount Lawley ==
Mount Lawley (1950–1989)
Member	Party	Term
Arthur Abbott	Liberal	1950–1956
Edward Oldfield	Independent Liberal	1956–1962
Ray O'Connor	Liberal	1962–1984
George Cash	Liberal	1984–1989
Mount Lawley (2008–present)
Member	Party	Term
Michael Sutherland	Liberal	2008–2017
Simon Millman	Labor	2017–2025
Frank Paolino	Labor	2025–present

== Election results ==
=== Elections in the 2020s ===
2025 Western Australian state election: Mount Lawley
Party	Candidate	Votes	%	±%
Labor	Frank Paolino	11,516	42.7	−16.5
Liberal	Michelle Sutherland	8,780	32.6	+9.4
Greens	Lucy Nicol	4,346	16.1	+4.8
Legalise Cannabis	Leo Treasure	878	3.3	+3.3
One Nation	Graeme Morrison	746	2.8	+2.0
Christians	Nathaly Key-Elliss	494	1.8	+0.2
Shooters, Fishers, Farmers	S. L. Singleton	204	0.8	+0.8
Total formal votes		26,964	96.4	−0.1
Informal votes		1,000	3.6	+0.1
Turnout		27,964	88.3	+3.6
Two-party-preferred result
Labor	Frank Paolino	16,352	60.7	−11.2
Liberal	Michelle Sutherland	10,607	39.3	+11.2
Labor hold		Swing	−11.2	

2021 Western Australian state election: Mount Lawley
Party	Candidate	Votes	%	±%
Labor	Simon Millman	14,653	59.0	+18.2
Liberal	Suzanne Migdale	5,807	23.4	−17.3
Greens	Lucy Nicol	2,768	11.1	−1.3
No Mandatory Vaccination	John Watt	549	2.2	+2.2
Christians	Ellen Joubert	425	1.7	−0.8
Western Australia	Russell Goodrick	321	1.3	+1.3
One Nation	Herbie Schaal	203	0.8	+0.8
WAxit	Gurjant Sangha	108	0.4	−1.1
Total formal votes		24,834	96.6	+1.0
Informal votes		887	3.4	−1.0
Turnout		25,721	86.6	−1.3
Two-party-preferred result
Labor	Simon Millman	17,768	71.6	+17.5
Liberal	Suzanne Migdale	7,063	28.4	−17.5
Labor hold		Swing	+17.5	

=== Elections in the 2010s ===
2017 Western Australian state election: Mount Lawley
Party	Candidate	Votes	%	±%
Labor	Simon Millman	9,642	40.8	+7.8
Liberal	Michael Sutherland	9,621	40.7	−13.3
Greens	Matt Roberts	2,938	12.4	+2.6
Christians	Janelle van Burgel	583	2.5	+0.3
Animal Justice	Kandi Revian	497	2.1	+2.1
Micro Business	Alexandra Farsalas	352	1.5	+1.5
Total formal votes		23,633	95.6	+2.0
Informal votes		1,099	4.4	−2.0
Turnout		24,732	88.1	+1.4
Two-party-preferred result
Labor	Simon Millman	12,767	54.1	+12.9
Liberal	Michael Sutherland	10,858	46.0	−12.9
Labor gain from Liberal		Swing	+12.9	

2013 Western Australian state election: Mount Lawley
Party	Candidate	Votes	%	±%
Liberal	Michael Sutherland	11,537	54.5	+9.6
Labor	Bob Kucera	6,888	32.6	–2.8
Greens	Tim Clifford	2,086	9.9	–3.6
Christians	Paul Connelly	452	2.1	–0.8
Family First	Dave Bolt	187	0.9	–0.6
Total formal votes		21,150	93.6	−0.9
Informal votes		1,446	6.4	+0.9
Turnout		22,596	89.4	
Two-party-preferred result
Liberal	Michael Sutherland	12,551	59.4	+7.7
Labor	Bob Kucera	8,594	40.6	–7.7
Liberal hold		Swing	+7.7	

=== Elections in the 2000s ===
2008 Western Australian state election: Mount Lawley
Party	Candidate	Votes	%	±%
Liberal	Michael Sutherland	8,607	46.4	+8.1
Labor	Karen Brown	6,487	35.0	−10.5
Greens	Chris Dickinson	2,639	14.2	+4.9
Christian Democrats	Paul Connelly	516	2.8	+0.0
Family First	Kay Warwick	305	1.6	+0.1
Total formal votes		18,554	94.6	
Informal votes		1,049	5.4	
Turnout		19,603	85.7	
Two-party-preferred result
Liberal	Michael Sutherland	9,680	52.2	+8.1
Labor	Karen Brown	8,865	47.8	−8.1
Liberal gain from Labor		Swing	+8.1	

=== Elections in the 1980s ===
1986 Western Australian state election: Mount Lawley
Party	Candidate	Votes	%	±%
Liberal	George Cash	8,615	52.1	−0.9
Labor	Kenneth Withers	7,914	47.9	+2.4
Total formal votes		16,529	97.5	+0.7
Informal votes		431	2.5	−0.7
Turnout		16,960	92.8	+5.2
Liberal hold		Swing	−1.3	

1984 Mount Lawley state by-election
Party	Candidate	Votes	%	±%
Liberal	George Cash	7,492	51.5	−1.5
Labor	Kenneth Withers	6,214	42.7	−2.8
Democrats	Julia Melland	544	3.7	+3.7
Independent	Frank Ash	291	2.0	+2.0
Total formal votes		14,541	96.9	+0.1
Informal votes		465	3.1	−0.1
Turnout		15,006	79.9	−7.7
Liberal hold		Swing	N/A	

- Preferences were not distributed.

1983 Western Australian state election: Mount Lawley
Party	Candidate	Votes	%	±%
Liberal	Ray O'Connor	7,909	53.0	
Labor	Desmond Hoffman	6,789	45.5	
Communist	Cedric Beidatsch	217	1.5	
Total formal votes		14,915	96.8	
Informal votes		499	3.2	
Turnout		15,414	87.6	
Two-party-preferred result
Liberal	Ray O'Connor	7,965	53.4	
Labor	Desmond Hoffman	6,950	46.6	
Liberal hold		Swing		

1980 Western Australian state election: Mount Lawley
Party	Candidate	Votes	%	±%
Liberal	Ray O'Connor	7,401	54.3	−2.3
Labor	Leslie Whittle	4,885	35.8	−1.9
Democrats	Ronald Downie	1,348	9.9	+9.9
Total formal votes		13,634	95.6	−1.0
Informal votes		620	4.4	+1.0
Turnout		14,254	88.4	−1.7
Two-party-preferred result
Liberal	Ray O'Connor	8,075	59.2	−0.3
Labor	Leslie Whittle	5,559	40.8	+0.3
Liberal hold		Swing	−0.3	

=== Elections in the 1970s ===
1977 Western Australian state election: Mount Lawley
Party	Candidate	Votes	%	±%
Liberal	Ray O'Connor	8,196	56.6	
Labor	Athol Monck	5,459	37.7	
Independent	Malcolm Hall	824	5.7	
Total formal votes		14,479	96.6	
Informal votes		502	3.4	
Turnout		14,981	90.1	
Two-party-preferred result
Liberal	Ray O'Connor	8,608	59.5	
Labor	Athol Monck	5,871	40.5	
Liberal hold		Swing		

1974 Western Australian state election: Mount Lawley
Party	Candidate	Votes	%	±%
Liberal	Ray O'Connor	7,441	53.2	
Labor	Arthur Chauncy	5,608	40.1	
National Alliance	John Poole	949	6.8	
Total formal votes		13,998	95.6	
Informal votes		640	4.4	
Turnout		14,638	89.9	
Two-party-preferred result
Liberal	Ray O'Connor	8,247	58.9	
Labor	Arthur Chauncy	5,751	41.1	
Liberal hold		Swing		

1971 Western Australian state election: Mount Lawley
Party	Candidate	Votes	%	±%
Liberal	Ray O'Connor	6,056	50.6	−9.4
Labor	Michael Helm	4,881	40.8	+0.8
Democratic Labor	Keith Anderson	1,027	8.6	+8.6
Total formal votes		11,964	95.6	−0.7
Informal votes		553	4.4	+0.7
Turnout		12,517	89.4	−2.0
Two-party-preferred result
Liberal	Ray O'Connor	6,794	56.8	−3.2
Labor	Michael Helm	5,170	43.2	+3.2
Liberal hold		Swing	−3.2	

=== Elections in the 1960s ===
1968 Western Australian state election: Mount Lawley
Party	Candidate	Votes	%	±%
Liberal and Country	Ray O'Connor	6,655	60.0	
Labor	Patrick Weir	4,440	40.0	
Total formal votes		11,095	96.3	
Informal votes		420	3.7	
Turnout		11,515	91.4	
Liberal and Country hold		Swing		

1965 Western Australian state election: Mount Lawley
Party	Candidate	Votes	%	±%
Liberal and Country	Ray O'Connor	6,189	63.6	+5.2
Labor	Mervyn Knight	3,545	36.4	−5.2
Total formal votes		9,734	95.5	−3.2
Informal votes		461	4.5	+4.3
Turnout		10,195	91.1	−0.8
Liberal and Country hold		Swing	+5.2	

1962 Western Australian state election: Mount Lawley
Party	Candidate	Votes	%	±%
Liberal and Country	Ray O'Connor	5,838	58.4	
Labor	Joe Berinson	4,156	41.6	
Total formal votes		9,994	98.7	
Informal votes		133	1.3	
Turnout		10,127	91.9	
Liberal and Country hold		Swing		

=== Elections in the 1950s ===
1959 Western Australian state election: Mount Lawley
Party	Candidate	Votes	%	±%
Independent	Edward Oldfield	4,963	44.8	−23.0
Liberal and Country	Alexander Barras	4,705	42.5	+10.3
Democratic Labor	Ernest Parker	1,412	12.7	+12.7
Total formal votes		11,080	97.2	+2.2
Informal votes		321	2.8	−2.2
Turnout		11,401	93.6	−0.3
Two-candidate-preferred result
Independent	Edward Oldfield	5,547	50.1	−17.7
Liberal and Country	Alexander Barras	5,533	49.9	+17.7
Independent hold		Swing	−17.7	

1956 Western Australian state election: Mount Lawley
Party	Candidate	Votes	%	±%
Independent Liberal	Edward Oldfield	6,242	67.8	
Liberal and Country	Arthur Abbott	2,965	32.2	
Total formal votes		9,207	95.0	
Informal votes		480	5.0	
Turnout		9,687	93.9	
Independent Liberal gain from Liberal and Country		Swing		

1953 Western Australian state election: Mount Lawley
Party	Candidate	Votes	%	±%
Liberal and Country	Arthur Abbott	5,944	89.8	+20.7
Independent	Edward Zeffertt	672	10.2	+10.2
Total formal votes		6,616	90.6	−3.7
Informal votes		689	9.4	+3.7
Turnout		7,305	91.8	+1.9
Liberal and Country hold		Swing	N/A	

1950 Western Australian state election: Mount Lawley
Party	Candidate	Votes	%	±%
Liberal and Country	Arthur Abbott	4,963	69.1	
Independent	James Collins	2,223	30.9	
Total formal votes		7,186	94.3	
Informal votes		430	5.7	
Turnout		7,616	89.9	
Liberal and Country hold		Swing		
