= Electoral results for the district of Innaloo =

Western Australian district election results

This is a list of electoral results for the Electoral district of Innaloo in Western Australian state elections.

== Members for Innaloo ==
Member	Party	Term
George Strickland	Liberal	1996–2001
John Quigley	Labor	2001–2005

== Election results ==
=== Elections in the 2000s ===
2001 Western Australian state election: Innaloo
Party	Candidate	Votes	%	±%
Labor	John Quigley	8,832	41.4	+5.8
Liberal	Wayne McCurry	7,622	35.7	−10.4
Greens	Emmie Lister	1,756	8.2	+0.6
Independent	Mark Beaver	1,218	5.7	+5.7
One Nation	Evelyn Grove	1,116	5.2	+5.2
Democrats	Graham Brown	794	3.7	−2.7
Total formal votes		21,338	94.8	+0.1
Informal votes		1,179	5.2	−0.1
Turnout		22,517	89.4	
Two-party-preferred result
Labor	John Quigley	11,554	54.5	+8.5
Liberal	Wayne McCurry	9,652	45.5	−8.5
Labor gain from Liberal		Swing	+8.5	

=== Elections in the 1990s ===
1996 Western Australian state election: Innaloo
Party	Candidate	Votes	%	±%
Liberal	George Strickland	9,516	46.1	−1.8
Labor	Anne Barrett	7,334	35.6	−4.7
Greens	Merilyn Keillor	1,566	7.6	+1.7
Democrats	Peter Markham	1,320	6.4	+3.7
Marijuana	Paul Shann	893	4.3	+4.3
Total formal votes		20,629	94.7	−1.5
Informal votes		1,159	5.3	+1.5
Turnout		21,788	89.6	
Two-party-preferred result
Liberal	George Strickland	11,117	54.0	+1.4
Labor	Anne Barrett	9,489	46.0	−1.4
Liberal hold		Swing	+1.4	
