= Rendezvous Hotel Perth Scarborough =

Hotel in Scarborough, Western Australia

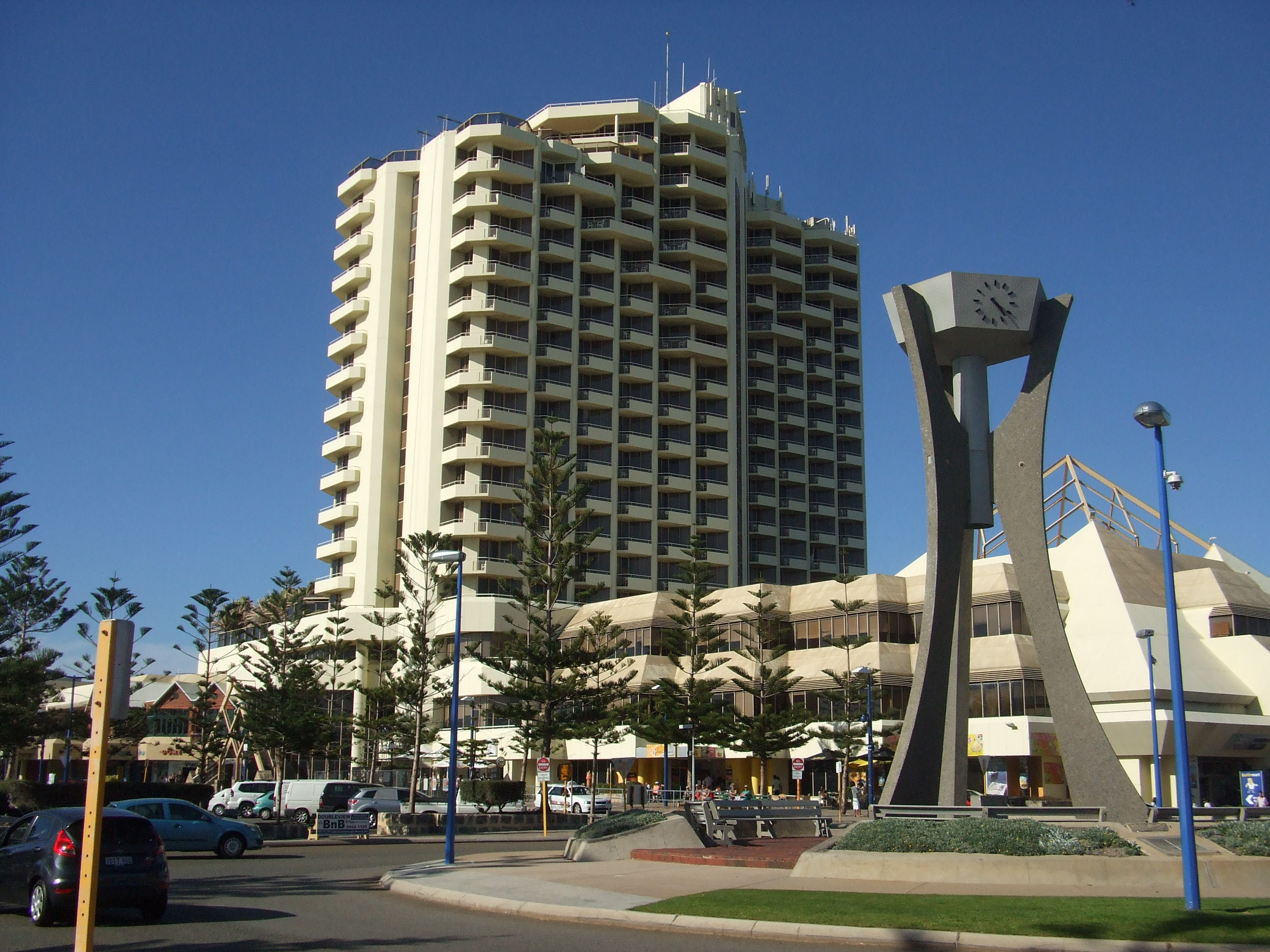
- The hotel in 2012
- Interactive map of the Rendezvous Hotel Perth Scarborough area
- Hotel chain: Rendezvous Hotels

General information
- Location: 148 The Esplanade, Scarborough, Western Australia
- Coordinates: 31°53′37″S 115°45′25″E
- Year built: 1980s
- Owner: Straits Trading Company

Technical details
- Floor count: 17 to 19

Other information
- Number of rooms: 337
- Number of restaurants: 1
- Number of bars: 1
- Public transit: Scarborough Beach bus station

Website
- rendezvousperthscarborough.com.au

The Rendezvous Hotel Perth Scarborough is a high rise beachside hotel in the Perth suburb of Scarborough, Western Australia. Originally known as Observation City, the hotel was constructed in the 1980s by Bond Corporation to accommodate visitors for the 1987 America's Cup, which was held off the coast of Perth. At 70 metres (230 ft) tall, the hotel is the tallest coastal building in Perth.

== Description ==
The Rendezvous Hotel is located at 148 The Esplanade, Scarborough, Western Australia, on the north-western corner of Scarborough Beach Road and West Coast Highway. According to the Council on Tall Buildings and Urban Habitat, the hotel is 70 metres (230 ft) tall, making it the tallest coastal building in Perth and the 61st tallest building in Perth overall. The building is variously described as 17, 18, or 19 storeys tall.

The hotel has 337 rooms and suites. Facilities include a gym, outdoor pool, spa, tennis courts, pool bar, and games room. The hotel has a restaurant named Straits Café and a bar.

The Rendezvous Hotel chain is owned by Australian company TFE Hotels, a joint venture between Singaporean company Far East Hospitality and Toga Group. Far East Hospitality is a joint venture between Far East Orchard and Straits Trading Company.

== History ==
=== Planning and construction ===
In October 1974, the City of Stirling, the local government area in which Scarborough belongs, gazetted a 7.6-hectare (19-acre) area of Scarborough as a "Special Beach Development Zone", requiring special approval from the Stirling council for development in the area, in an attempt to encourage a high standard of development, as opposed to piecemeal development. By the end of 1981 though, little development had occurred within the zone.

Austmark submitted a proposal to the Stirling council in early 1982 for the development of at least one 20 storey building and 10 storey building in the Special Beach Development Zone. Council approved the proposal as a concept plan in May 1982, but the development did not proceed because Austmark had not acquired all the land required. A syndicate led by Alan Bond won the America's Cup in September 1983, meaning the cup had to be defended about four years later off the coast of Perth. Bond Corporation acquired Austmark in late 1983 and the development was revived. A new development application was made to the Stirling council in November 1983, this time with all the necessary land already acquired. The development was named "Observation City" as it was intended to be used to observe the America's Cup in 1987.

Due to the desire for the hotel's completion before the 1987 America's Cup, Bond Corporation wanted to speed up the development's approval. Bond Corporation property manager Bruce Buckley said in a letter to the mayor of Stirling in February 1984 that "we have set ourselves a difficult task in scheduling to have this project completed by late 1986 and we can only make this time frame by way of receiving positive Council support in all aspects in the shortest possible time." During February and March 1984 was a 21-day period where the development was advertised for public comment. The City of Stirling Planning Department received 5,327 submissions, of which 4,534 were in support of the development and 793 were opposed. The Scarborough Ratepayers Association was strongly opposed, and they presented a petition with 4,000 signatures opposing the project. The ratepayers association also claimed that a majority of councillors would vote against development approval, which also convinced Bond Corporation that the development approval was at risk. The Planning Department recommended that council approve the development, subject to numerous conditions, which were described as "onerous" by the WA Inc royal commission report.

On 20 March 1984, the development application was approved by council. Voting in favour were councillors Cash, Strickland, Tyzack, Grierson, McNamara, Satchell, Venville, Hancock, Anderson, and Britton. Voting against approval were councillors Camilleri, Smith, and Edwards. The hotel was built in 1986.

In the early 1990s, the Royal Commission into Commercial Activities of Government and Other Matters investigated allegations of bribery during the approval of the hotel. In 1987, former premier of Western Australia Ray O'Connor falsely told Labor MP Terry Burke that he had bribed City of Stirling councillors on behalf of Bond Corporation to approve the hotel's development application. The commission eventually determined that no bribery took place, and that O'Connor had kept the $25,000 cheque given to him by Bond Corporation for himself. O'Connor was charged in May 1993 with stealing the $25,000 cheque, and in February 1995, he was convicted and sentenced to 18 months in prison. He was released on parole after six months in prison.

=== After opening ===
Singaporean company Straits Trading Company bought Observation City for $45.5 million in 1994, the company's first property purchase in Australia.

Celebrities to have stayed at Observation City include Michael Jackson, Bono, and Kylie Minogue.

In March 2008, Straits announced a proposed $120 million redevelopment of the hotel. The plan involved converting the existing 333 hotel rooms to 102 luxury apartments, a new eight storey hotel on the southern end of the site with 142 rooms, and two levels for restaurants, cafes and retail outlets. Architecture firm Hassell designed the redevelopment. 28 out of 34 public submissions during March 2008 supported the proposal. In July 2008, the City of Stirling's Planning and Development Committee recommended that council reject the proposal, as the development did not retain enough hotel or retail space, which would hurt Scarborough's standing as a tourist spot. The Stirling council voted the following month to reject the proposal. In September 2008, Straits appealed the decision at the State Administrative Tribunal, but the same month, the minister for planning and infrastructure, Alannah MacTiernan, used call-in provisions of the Planning and Development Act to give herself the power of final approval. Straits announced in March 2009 that the proposal had been put on hold due to the 2008 financial crisis, with Straits Trading Company President Norman Ip saying that "due to the current economic environment, it is not an ideal time to launch a luxury apartment project of this scale".

A draft planning scheme revealed in November 2009 proposed restrictions to the Observation City site, restricting it to tourism use only, preventing conversion to apartments. Planning Minister John Day said the hotel was critical to the growth of tourism in the area.

A new proposal was made in October 2011, which involved two new eight storey apartment buildings to the north and south of the hotel building, and a refurbishment of the hotel. The northern building would have 60 apartments and the southern building would have 84 apartments. The Stirling council approved the development application in December 2011, and it was sent to the Western Australian Planning Commission for final approval.

In May 2014, the Rendezvous Hotel was reopened following a $60 million refurbishment.

== See also ==
- Rendezvous Hotel Singapore
- Pacific Tower, Christchurch
