= List of Australian politicians convicted of crimes =

The following is a list of Australian politicians convicted of crimes.

== Federal ==
Name	Year	Party	Offence	Timing of conviction	Sentence	Reference
William Henry Groom	1846	Protectionist	Stealing (Note: Only former transported convict to be elected to federal parliament.)	Before office	Transportation to Australia	
Charles Kingston	1892	Protectionist	Duelling (Note: In relation to an attempt to duel Richard Chaffey Baker, also a future federal MP.)	Before office	Good behaviour bond	
John Curtin	1914	Labor	Failing to comply with a compulsory medical examination for conscription (Note: Later became prime minister of Australia; first prime minister to be convicted of an offence)	Before office	3 days' jail	
Donald Grant	1916	Labor	Conspiracy to commit arson, perverting the course of justice, incitement to commit sedition	Before office	15 years' jail (Note: Part of the Sydney Twelve. Served four years before conviction overturned.)	
Benjamin Benny	1926	Nationalist	Fraudulent conversion of trust funds	After office	3 years' jail	
George Rankin	1938	Country	Drink driving	During office	Fined £25	
Thomas Ley	1947	Nationalist	Murder (Note: Involvement with a number of disappearances, including that of Frederick McDonald, his predecessor as MP)	After office	Death, later commuted to confinement in Broadmoor Asylum	
Jock Garden	1948	Labor	Forgery	After office	3 years' jail	
Wilson Tuckey	1967	Liberal	Assault (Note: After being convicted of assaulting an Aboriginal man, he was nicknamed "Iron Bar")	Before office	Fined $50	
Derryn Hinch (Note: Hinch was a radio announcer at the times of his crimes, and was elected to the Australian Senate in 2016)	1987, 2011, 2014	Justice	Contempt of court, breaching suppression orders	Before office	12 days in prison, 5 months' home detention, 50 days in prison	
Colin Hollis	1990	Labor	Indecent exposure	During office	Good behaviour bond	
Frank Ford	1996	Liberal	Fraud	After office		
Michael Cobb	1998	National	Rorting travel expenses	During office	Fined $14,000; 2 year suspended jail term	
Bob Woods	1999	Liberal	Rorting travel expenses	After office	18 month suspended jail sentence	
Andrew Theophanous	2002	Labor	Bribery and fraud	After office	6 years' jail (Note: Served two years and successfully appealed the fraud charge.)	
Craig Thomson	2014	Labor; Independent	Theft	After office	$25,000 fine (Note: Reduced from 12 months' jail with 9 months suspended on appeal, 49 charges of fraud dismissed.)	
Steve Irons	2015	Liberal	Unlicensed drink driving	During office	4 month good behaviour order	

== New South Wales ==
Name	Year	Party	Offence	Sentence	Notes	Reference
Peter Howe	1891	Protectionist	Conspiracy to defraud the Australian Mercantile Loan and Guarantee Company	Imprisoned for 7 years, released after 3 years and 7 months.	One of a series of prosecutions in relation to bank failures. Resigned from the Legislative Assembly after conviction	
Frank Smith	1892	Free Trade	conspiracy to fraudulently misrepresent the financial affairs of the Australian Mercantile Loan and Guarantee Company	Imprisoned for 7 years, released after 3 years.	One of a series of prosecutions in relation to bank failures, had been defeated in 1891.	
Francis Abigail	1892	Free Trade	Conspiracy to issue a false balance-sheet	Imprisoned for 5 years, released after 2 years and 6 months.	One of a series of prosecutions in relation to bank failures, had been defeated in 1891.	
Thomas Slattery	1905	Protectionist	Stealing £6,958	Imprisoned for 3 years and 6 months, set aside by High Court	Seat in Legislative Council declared vacant after conviction but before the successful appeal to the High Court.	
Alan Millard	1906	Liberal Reform	Misappropriation of £5 of a client's money	6 months, suspended on 12 month good behaviour bond	Seat in Legislative Assembly was declared vacant	
Theodore Trautwein	1940	Independent	False representation to avoid bankruptcy	Imprisoned for 12 months	Seat in Legislative Council declared vacant by the Court of Disputed Returns. Subsequently imprisoned for contempt of court.	
Thomas Ley (also served in Federal Parliament)	1947	Nationalist	Murder	Death, later commuted to confinement in Broadmoor Asylum	Involvement with a number of disappearances, including that of Frederick McDonald, his predecessor as MP	
Rex Jackson	1987	Labor	Accepting bribes	10 years	Former Minister for Corrective Services. Increased from 7½ years on appeal	
Tony Packard	1993	Liberal	Unlawful use of listening devices	Fined $1000	Offences were committed while operating a used-car business, prior to entering parliament	
Barry Morris	1996	Liberal	Making death threats	1 year	Decreased from 2½ years on appeal	
Phuong Ngo	2001	Independent; Labor	Murder	Life imprisonment	Convicted of ordering the killing of Australian MP John Newman on 5 September 1994, a crime which has been described as Australia's first political assassination.	
Milton Orkopoulos	2008	Labor	33 counts, including child sex and drug offences	13 years and 8 months (non-parole period 9 years)	Decreased from 13 years and 11 months on appeal	
Richard Face	2009	Labor	Making a false statement to the ICAC	Fined $2,500, three-year good-behaviour bond	Lied about misusing parliamentary and electoral office staff to help set up a consultancy.	
Karyn Paluzzano	2012	Labor	Falsely claiming parliamentary payments	Twelve months' home detention		
Adam Marshall	2014	National	Mid-range prescribed content of alcohol	Driver's licence suspended for nine months, fined $2,000	Returned a blood alcohol reading of 0.112.	
Eddie Obeid	2016	Labor	Misconduct in public office	5 years (non-parole period of 3 years)	Failing to declare his precuniary interest while a member of parliament and subsequent attempts to influence bureaucrats and Labor colleagues so as to benefit his family	
Ian Macdonald	2017	Labor	Wilful misconduct in public office	10 years (non-parole period 7 years) set aside on appeal	Conviction set aside on appeal and re-trial ordered	
Eddie Obeid	2021	Labor	Conspiracy to wilfully commit misconduct in public office		Eddie Obeid, Moses Obeid and Ian Macdonald conspired for Macdonald to commit misconduct concerning the granting of a coal exploration licence involving the Mount Penny tenement	
Ian Macdonald	2021	Labor	Conspiracy to wilfully commit misconduct in public office		Eddie Obeid, Moses Obeid and Ian Macdonald conspired for Macdonald to commit misconduct concerning the granting of a coal exploration licence involving the Mount Penny tenement	
Gareth Ward	2025	Liberal	Sexual intercourse without consent, three counts of indecent assault			

== Queensland ==
Name	Year	Party	Offence	Sentence	Notes	Reference
William Hamilton	1891	Labor	conspiracy in connection with the Queensland shearers' strike	3 years	future state MP	
Brian Austin	1990	National	misappropriating public funds	15 months		
Leisha Harvey	1990	National	misappropriating public funds	12 months	7 months served in home detention	
Don Lane	1990	National	misappropriating public funds	12 months		
Geoff Muntz	1990	National	misappropriating public funds	12 months		
Keith Wright	1993	Labor	child sex offences	8 years (non-parole period 4 years), paroled after 5½ years	Former Opposition Leader	
Bill D'Arcy	2000	Labor	child sex offences	11 years (non-parole period 7 years)		
John Budd	2002	Labor	fraud and misappropriation	2½ years (suspended)		
Merri Rose	2005	Labor	extortion	1½ years		
Karen Struthers	2007	Labor	Drink driving	$1,000 fine and loss of licence for 10 months		
Gordon Nuttall	2009, 2011	Labor	Corruption, receiving secret commissions, theft	15 years (non-parole period 10 years)		
Scott Driscoll	2013	Liberal National	42 counts of contempt of Parliament, four counts of failing to register interests and one count of misleading the House	fined $84,000 for contempt; fined $4,000 for failing to register interests; fined $2,000 for misleading the House; and the Legislative Assembly moved to expel Driscoll from the chamber and declare the seat of Redcliffe vacant "to protect the honour and dignity of the Legislative Authority".		
Paul Pisasale	2019	Labor; Independent	2 counts of extortion. In 2020 he pleaded guilty to 30 other charges including Fraud, Sexual Assault and Official Corruption	7.5 years (non-parole period 3 years)	Former Mayor of Ipswich	

== Tasmania ==
Name	Year	Party	Offence	Sentence	Notes	Reference
John McDonald	1951	Labor	Manslaughter	10 years' jail		
Brenton Best	2002	Labor	Drink driving	fine and loss of licence		
Terry Martin	2011	Independent	Producing child pornography and sexual penetration of a child under the age of 17	suspended sentence		

== South Australia ==
Name	Year	Party	Offence	Sentence	Notes	Reference
John Richards	1882		Twice convicted of cheque fraud	Imprisonment for 1 months and imprisonment for 3 months		
Beasley Kearney	1933	Labor	Fraud	Imprisonment for 3 years		
Tammy Franks	2012	Greens South Australia	Tax Return FTL Penalty (10 charges of failing to lodge tax returns)	Fined $6600 and ordered her to pay $7,500 court costs		
Bernard Finnigan	2015	Labor; Independent	Obtaining access to child pornography	A 15-month suspended sentence with a three-year $1,000 good behaviour bond	Also added to the sex offender register	
Troy Bell	2024	Liberal; Independent	20 counts of theft and five counts of dishonest dealings with documents	5 years (non-parole period 2 years and 6 months)		
David Speirs	2025	Liberal	Two counts of supplying a controlled drug	A $9,000 fine and 37.5 hours of community service.		

== Victoria ==
Name	Year	Party	Offence	Sentence	Notes	Reference
Carolyn Hirsh	2004	Labor	Drink driving	$600 fine and driving ban of 6 months		
Andrew Olexander	2004	Liberal	Drink driving	$500 fine and loss of licence for 12 months		
Carolyn Hirsh	2006	Labor	Drink driving and driving while disqualified	$600 fine and driving ban of 1 year		
Adem Somyurek	2009	Labor	Driving while disqualified	One-month suspended jail sentence and $300 fine		
Tim Smith	2021	Liberal	Drink driving	$750 fine and 1 year license suspension		
Russell Northe	2023	National	Misconduct in public office	21-month jail sentence		

== Western Australia ==
Name	Year	Party	Offence	Sentence	Notes	Ref
Julian Stuart	1891	Labor	conspiracy in connection with the Queensland shearers' strike	3 years	future state MP	
George Taylor	1891	Labor	conspiracy in connection with the Queensland shearers' strike	3 years	future state MP	
John Marquis Hopkins	1910	Ministerial	Forging and uttering a promissory note	5 years	sitting state MP	
Frederick Baglin	1923	Labor	stealing as a servant	3 years	sitting state MP	
Bill Grayden	1978	Liberal	assault and wilful damage		sitting state MP	
Brian Burke	1994	Labor	fraud	two years	former state premier, guilty of four counts of defrauding the state by making false claims on the parliamentary imprest account, paroled after seven months	
Ray O'Connor	1995	Liberal	stealing a Bond Corporation cheque	18 months	former state premier, paroled after six months	
David Parker	1996	Labor	perjury	18 months	former state deputy premier, paroled after six months	
Brian Burke	1997	Labor	stealing $122,585 in campaign donations from the Labor Party	3 years	former state premier, conviction quashed after six months in jail	
Wayde Smith	1998	Liberal	perjury	18 months	paroled after six months	
Graham Burkett	2006	Labor	receiving bribes	14 months	former mayor of Stirling and state MP	
Ben Dawkins	2023	Labor	Breaching a violence restraining order	A $2,000 fine and a 10-month community-based order	sitting state MP, expelled from the Labor Party	
James Hayward	2023	National Party	charged with child sex offences.	2 years and 9 months	sitting state MP,	

== See also ==
- List of political controversies in Australia
- Rory Amon – former Liberal member of the New South Wales Legislative Assembly awaiting trial for child sex crimes
- Crime in Australia
