= Electoral results for the district of Butler =

Western Australian district election results

This is a list of electoral results for the electoral district of Butler in Western Australian state elections.

== Members for Butler ==
Member	Party	Term
John Quigley	Labor	2013–2025
Lorna Clarke	Labor	2025–present

== Election results ==
=== Elections in the 2020s ===
2025 Western Australian state election: Butler
Party	Candidate	Votes	%	±%
Labor	Lorna Clarke	12,605	47.2	−30.0
Liberal	Rikki Baulch	6,007	22.5	+8.9
Greens	Matthew Price	2,851	10.7	+6.6
One Nation	Mark Powley	2,088	7.8	+7.8
Legalise Cannabis	Ramon Granados	2,025	7.6	+7.6
Christians	Vanessa Montgomery	1,151	4.3	+2.2
Total formal votes		26,727	94.8	−1.5
Informal votes		1,470	5.2	+1.5
Turnout		28,197	79.0	+7.0
Two-party-preferred result
Labor	Lorna Clarke	14,778	64.7	−17.9
Liberal	Rikki Baulch	8,071	35.3	+17.9
Labor hold		Swing	−17.9	

Results are not final. Last updated on 24 March 2025 at 6:00 PM AWST

2021 Western Australian state election: Butler
Party	Candidate	Votes	%	±%
Labor	John Quigley	19,806	77.0	+19.4
Liberal	Linda Aitken	3,565	13.9	−6.3
Greens	Elizabeth Kamara	1,037	4.0	−2.3
No Mandatory Vaccination	P. Becker	609	2.4	+2.4
Christians	Katrina Hildebrandt	542	2.1	+0.4
WAxit	Raj Bawa	178	0.7	−0.2
Total formal votes		25,737	96.2	+1.1
Informal votes		1,014	3.8	−1.1
Turnout		26,751	81.8	+9.6
Two-party-preferred result
Labor	John Quigley	21,168	82.2	+11.7
Liberal	Linda Aitken	4,569	17.8	−11.7
Labor hold		Swing	+11.7	

=== Elections in the 2010s ===
2017 Western Australian state election: Butler
Party	Candidate	Votes	%	±%
Labor	John Quigley	13,392	55.9	+10.7
Liberal	Linda Aitken	5,006	20.9	−23.6
One Nation	Susan Hoddinott	2,131	8.9	+8.9
Greens	Tom Webster	1,659	6.9	−1.5
Shooters, Fishers, Farmers	Jan van Niekerk	884	3.7	+3.7
Christians	Ryno Joubert	439	1.8	−0.0
Micro Business	Ola Sommer	231	1.0	+1.0
Matheson for WA	Ron Smith	224	0.9	+0.9
Total formal votes		23,966	95.1	+2.0
Informal votes		1,226	4.9	−2.0
Turnout		25,192	82.9	+6.9
Two-party-preferred result
Labor	John Quigley	16,641	69.5	+18.5
Liberal	Linda Aitken	7,321	30.6	−18.5
Labor hold		Swing	+18.5	

2013 Western Australian state election: Butler
Party	Candidate	Votes	%	±%
Labor	John Quigley	10,510	45.5	–4.4
Liberal	Linda Aitken	9,991	43.3	+9.3
Greens	Thomas Webster	2,067	8.9	–1.5
Christians	Steven Leeder	529	2.3	+0.1
Total formal votes		23,097	93.1	–1.5
Informal votes		1,699	6.9	+1.5
Turnout		24,796	86.8	
Two-party-preferred result
Labor	John Quigley	11,951	51.8	–8.6
Liberal	Linda Aitken	11,136	48.2	+8.6
Labor hold		Swing	–8.6	
