= Frederick Irwin Anglican School =

Coordinates: 32.5088°S 115.7515°E

- Mandurah, Western Australia; Australia

Information
- Type: Independent
- Motto: The truth will set you free
- Denomination: Anglican
- Established: 1991
- Principal: Geoffrey Arnold (1991–2011); Kerry Robertson (2012–2021); Tracey Gray (2022- current)
- Staff: 169
- Colours: Green and yellow
- Website: www.frederickirwin.wa.edu.au

Frederick Irwin Anglican School (originally Frederick Irwin Anglican Community School) is a co-educational private school located in Meadow Springs in Mandurah, Western Australia, with students from Kindergarten to Year 12. The name change of the school occurred in 1997 including the new abbreviation of FIAS as the school is now known locally today.

The Frederick Irwin Anglican School – Halls Head Campus, opened in January 2018, caters for Kindergarten to Year 6 students. The school motto for both campuses is "The Truth Will Set You Free."

== History ==
=== Cultural and administrative history ===
The Meadow Springs Campus opened in February 1991 with 175 students and now has over 1600 students from Kindergarten to Year 12.

The school was named after Frederick Irwin, who was involved in the establishment of the General Board of Education during his second term as Relieving Governor of the Swan River Colony.

2011 saw the foundation principal, Geoffrey Arnold, hand the school over to its second principal, Kerry Robertson, to continue and grow the school into the 21st century.

2022 saw the handover of the principal role from Kerry Robertson to Tracey Gray.

=== Grounds history ===
The Meadow Springs Campus school grounds and facilities have developed considerably since foundation, with the additions of the Year 7 Transition Centre and the Rush Chapel, which was completed in July 2016.

In 2018, Frederick Irwin Anglican School (with the Anglican Schools Commission Inc.) opened the Halls Head Campus, allowing the intake of more primary students across two campuses within the Mandurah community.

In more recent years, the double-storey Kwobadiny Sports Centre's construction was completed in 2023, serving as a new high-quality sports facility for students of the Highschool sector. The gymnasium's main feature is its large multi-purpose, open-air courts functioning as both a sportsground for students and as an events space for whole-school assemblies and alike proceedings. The opening of the sports center was welcomed by both students and staff.

In 2025 the Halls Head Campus opened its new Early Learning Centre and Administration Building.

== Grounds ==
=== Meadow Springs Campus ===
The school is architecturally divided into the primary and secondary, bisected by the entrance road and connected via an underpass and a gymnasium with a mezzanine, sometimes used as an art gallery.

The school library is surrounded by extensive green lawns. The Performing Arts Center is near Oakmont Avenue with two music classrooms, a drama room, a theatre stage (that can seat 180 people), two keyboard rooms and many small individual tutoring music rooms. There are seven main blocks. The E block is English and Manual Arts, the B block is Science, the J/K block is for Social Studies, the G block is the Information Technology block, M block is Home Economics, the D block is Mathematics and a small room adjoining the gym is the H block. Within each block (excluding the E, M and H blocks) is a set of lockers for each year group. There is also a set of lockers surrounding the "Central Quad". The east side of the school supports a gymnasium, three ovals and 6 basketball/netball/tennis courts.

=== Halls Head Campus ===
Located on the corner of Karon and Waxflower Vista in Halls Head, the Halls Head Campus includes a Multi-Purpose Room which is used for assemblies, music lessons, services and before and after school care. Years 1–4 are in the same block area closest to the Multi-Purpose Room and the staff room. The Oval is situated outside of the staff room, next to the two play equipment areas, and is used for sports lessons and community events. Kindergarten, Pre-Primary, Learning Enrichment and Years 5/6 are located closest to the Administration Office and I.T. classroom, near to the staff parking. The Library is currently located on the edge of the school blocks, in a temporary demountable building.

== House system ==
The school was previously divided into four houses, six as of 2014 with the addition of Arnold and Barrett:

- Arnold (teal) – Geoffrey Arnold was the Foundation Principal of our School. He led Frederick Irwin Anglican School from 1991 until the end of 2011.
- Barrett (purple) – Canon Ken Barrett OAM was the parish priest of Christ's Church in Mandurah at the time of the School's foundation; he is an Honorary Life Member of the School Council and an Honorary Freeman of the City of Mandurah.
- Ellis (marle grey) – Anthony Ellis was formerly the chief executive officer of the Anglican Schools Commission.
- Gordon (green) – Named after the Gordon tartan that is an integral part of the School's uniform and also recognises that the School is located on Gordon Road.
- Jamieson (blue) – Bishop Hamish Jamieson was the Bishop of Bunbury at the time of the School's foundation in 1991. Bishop Jamieson also wrote the School Prayer.
- Rose (red) – Brennan Rose was the Foundation Chair of the School Council.

All students in Primary and Secondary classes are placed in "House Groups". Secondary students are divided into seven House Groups from Years 7 to 12. All students in Secondary attend house period before officially starting lessons. On Tuesdays and Thursdays, an extended House period is declared in which a sport will be played or an assembly will be held.

Each House has a two House Captains (Year 6s) two Sports Captains (Year 6s), 1 Chapel Leader (Year 6s), Two Mandurah Junior Councillors (Year 6s), 1 ICT Captain (Year 6s), 2 Eco Leaders (Year 6s), House Prefect (Year 12), Head of House (secondary), Assistant Head of House (secondary) and House Coordinator (Primary – one per campus)

== Music department ==
Frederick Irwin Anglican School offers a music program for its Students. All students in Year 8 take a compulsory Music course in which Instrumental Guitar is taught, and may be carried on in further years of Secondary Schooling. The school provides Year 11 and 12 students with the opportunity to take the non-ATAR 'Contemporary Music', including a minimum 30-minute private lesson per week, alongside the ATAR course, 'Western Music', as well as the option to take a Certificate II in Creative Industries (Live Production focus) and Certificate III in Music Industry.

Music scholarships by audition and interview are awarded to eligible students in the entering Years 7 and 11.

Oakmont Theatre, the performing arts centre, sees an integration of both the Music and Drama departments, providing students with:

- Large band practice room
- Computer labs equipped with integrated electronic keyboards
- Practice/instrumental music teaching rooms
- Music classrooms
- Large auditorium
- Drama rehearsal room
- Sound recording studio
- Costume room
- Professional changerooms
- Audio Visual Centre
- Mezzanine floor
- Kitchen/canteen area
- Foyer

The Frederick Irwin Anglican School Music Department offers many after-school and lunchtime programs for its students. These include:

- Concert Band
- Chamber Orchestra
- String Orchestra
- Clarinet Ensemble
- Saxophone Ensemble
- Flute Ensemble
- String Ensemble
- Start Up Concert Band
- Jazz Ensemble

== Notable alumni ==
- Stuart Aubrey, Labor Party politician in the Western Australian Legislative Assembly
- Aaron Heal, first-class cricketer
- Paul Bower, Australian rules footballer
- Craig Silvey, novelist
- Jean Capotorto, member of the indie pop duo, Tim & Jean
- Kimberley Mickle, Australian representative to the 2012 Olympics in Athletics
