= Electoral district of Scarborough =

State electoral district of Western Australia

Scarborough Western Australia—Legislative Assembly
- Interactive map of electoral district boundaries from the 2025 state election
- State: Western Australia
- Dates current: 1974–1996; 2008–present
- MP: Stuart Aubrey
- Party: Labor
- Namesake: Scarborough
- Electors: 31,370 (2025)
- Area: 19 km^{2} (7.3 sq mi)
- Demographic: Metropolitan
- Coordinates: 31.89°S 115.78°E
Electorates around Scarborough:
Indian Ocean	Carine	Balcatta
Indian Ocean	Scarborough	Balcatta
Indian Ocean	Churchlands	Churchlands

Scarborough is an electoral district of the Legislative Assembly in the Australian state of Western Australia.

The district is a coastal electorate based in the northern suburbs of Perth and is named for the suburb of Scarborough. It also includes the suburbs of Doubleview, Innaloo, Osborne Park and parts of the suburbs of City Beach, Gwelup, Karrinyup and Trigg.

Politically, the district is a marginal one. Based on the results of the 2005 state election, the seat was created with a Liberal Party majority of 52.4% to 47.6% versus the Labor Party.

== History ==
Scarborough was first created at the 1972 redistribution, and was first contested at the 1974 election. Although typically a Liberal-held seat, it was won by the Labor Party at the 1983 and 1986 elections. The district was abolished at the 1996 election, largely replaced by the seat of Innaloo. Innaloo continued in the same trend as its predecessor, being won by Labor candidate John Quigley at the 2001 election before being abolished at the 2003 redistribution.

A new seat called Scarborough was created for the 2008 state election when the number of metropolitan seats was increased in accordance with the new one vote one value legislation. Scarborough was formed from the territory of two existing electorates: the southern end of Carine and the northern end of Churchlands.

== Members for Scarborough ==
Scarborough (1974–1996)
Member	Party	Term
Ray Young	Liberal	1974–1983
Graham Burkett	Labor	1983–1989
George Strickland	Liberal	1989–1996
Scarborough (2008–present)
Liza Harvey	Liberal	2008–2021
Stuart Aubrey	Labor	2021–present

== Election results ==
2025 Western Australian state election: Scarborough
Party	Candidate	Votes	%	±%
Labor	Stuart Aubrey	11,019	41.6	−7.5
Liberal	Damien Kelly	10,199	38.5	+2.9
Greens	Mark Twiss	3,270	12.4	+2.6
National	Elizabeth Re	1,254	4.7	+4.7
Animal Justice	Emily Stokes	725	2.7	+2.7
Total formal votes		26,467	97.0	−0.1
Informal votes		819	3.0	+0.1
Turnout		27,286	86.0	+4.2
Two-party-preferred result
Labor	Stuart Aubrey	14,563	55.0	−4.5
Liberal	Damien Kelly	11,897	45.0	+4.5
Labor hold		Swing	−4.5	
