= Simon Millman =

Australian politician

Member of the Western Australian Legislative Assembly for Mount Lawley
- In office 11 March 2017 – 5 February 2025
- Preceded by: Michael Sutherland
- Succeeded by: Frank Paolino

Personal details
- Born: 14 January 1977 (age 49) Geelong, Victoria
- Party: Labor
- Education: University of Western Australia
- Profession: Lawyer
- Website: mountlawley.walabor.org.au

Simon Alexander Millman (born 14 January 1977) is an Australian politician. He was elected Labor member of the Western Australian Legislative Assembly, representing Mount Lawley, in 2017 and 2021. He retired from politics at the 2025 state election.

Millman studied law at the University of Western Australia, and worked as an industrial relations lawyer at Slater and Gordon.

== Career ==
=== End of Life Choices ===
Millman was one of the members of the WA Parliament's Joint Select Committee on End of Life Choices that recommended the introduction of assisted dying legislation in August 2018.

Speaking on the tabling of the committee's report he said:

there was more than enough evidence presented to our committee for us to reach the view that assistance is being provided to patients at the end of their life, but that this assistance, although arguably illegal, does not lead to any criminal prosecution. I call this "don't ask don't tell". As a lawyer with a faithful belief in the rule of law, this is an intolerable situation. Bad laws should not be evaded and avoided; bad laws should be changed. Access to rights should be available to everyone equally, based on the premise that no-one is above or beyond the law.

One of the committee's recommendations concerned establishing an Expert Panel to advise on ways to increase take-up of Advance Health Directives, the legally binding mechanism by which Western Australians are able to set out their wishes regarding future treatment options. Millman was appointed by Attorney General John Quigley as Chair of the Expert Panel. Writing in Western Australia's daily newspaper, the West Australian, Millman reflected on the need for the Panel by referring to the committee's deliberations:

It was profoundly concerning to hear that some health providers are failing to abide by the terms of legally binding AHDs.

As a lawyer, I find it astounding that a person can have these wishes simply disregarded by health professionals.

We must do more to protect the credibility of this mechanism so we can all have confidence that, at our most vulnerable, our wishes will be respected by our health providers.

Legislation giving effect to the committee's recommendations was introduced in August 2019 and passed by the Parliament in December 2019.

Speaking on the Voluntary Assisted Dying Bill 2019, Millman said:

I have been fortified in my view that I should support this legislation by some of the incredible contributions made by members in this chamber. I do not have the personal stories to tell. Thank God, my mum and dad are both still alive and my family are all well—touch wood. I do not have those stories. My constituents have shared their stories with me. They are personal, private stories, so I do not propose to share their stories, but I am fortified because I have heard many incredible stories from the compassionate people in this chamber who have gone out and shown empathy in listening to their constituents and conveying those messages so that we can deliberate properly on this legislation.

In 2019 Millman visited Israel as part of a Health and Medical Innovation Delegation led by Deputy Premier and Minister for Health Roger Cook, organised by the Australia-Israel Chamber of Commerce (WA). Speaking in the Legislative Assembly, Millman said of the trip:

'Western Australia shares with Israel both an entrepreneurial spirit and a tradition of outstanding medical innovation. The calibre of delegates on the trip was a testament to both these attributes.'

=== Public Accounts Committee work ===
Millman is one of five members of the Assembly's Public Accounts Committee, with portfolio responsibility for oversight of the Premier, Treasurer, Minister for Finance, Minister for Public Sector Management and the Minister for Federal-State Relations.

He has taken a particular interest in the field of public sector contract management.

On the report into the committee's third report, 'PCH – A Long Waiting Period: A critique of the state's management and oversight of the Perth Children's Hospital project', Millman said:

During the course of this project, the Construction, Forestry, Mining and Energy Union was criticised for the industrial action it took to improve workers' conditions and health and safety on site. Several years ago it was suggested that industrial action by the CFMEU was delaying this project. That suggestion was then and remains today completely unsupported by any evidence. The then federal Minister for Employment, Senator Michaelia Cash, criticised the union. She was completely wrong. By directly and respectfully raising in correspondence with the then Premier concerns about the managing contractor, subcontractors getting ripped off and noncompliant building products like asbestos, the CFMEU did more to ensure the safe completion of this hospital than many others had done, especially Senator Cash, who obviously had no idea what she is talking about.

It was a subject to which he returned later in the year on the tabling of the PAC's report '"Knowing What Good Looks Like: Challenges in Managing Major Public Sector Contracts':

This is not the first, and will not be the last, report on contract management and government procurement. Time and cost overruns in major public projects remain all too frequent. However, as all members who have spoken have indicated, this report could not be more timely... a good contract management process will hopefully allow us to avoid costly litigation, such as that reported in The West Australian today, at page 9 under the heading "Not what the doctor ordered: Children's hospital could cost us another $300m".

=== Retirement ===
Millman announced in April 2024 that he would retire at the 2025 election. He was succeeded by Labor candidate Frank Paolino.

Western Australian Legislative Assembly
Preceded by Michael Sutherland	Member for Mount Lawley; 2017–2025	Succeeded by Frank Paolino
