= Ray O'Connor =

Australian politician (1926–2013)

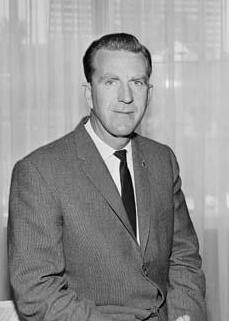
- O'Connor in 1965

22nd Premier of Western Australia
- In office 25 January 1982 – 25 February 1983
- Monarch: Elizabeth II
- Governor: Sir Richard Trowbridge
- Deputy: Cyril Rushton
- Preceded by: Sir Charles Court
- Succeeded by: Brian Burke

Leader of the Opposition
- In office 25 February 1983 – 15 February 1984
- Premier: Brian Burke
- Deputy: Bill Hassell
- Preceded by: Brian Burke
- Succeeded by: Bill Hassell

Leader of the Western Australian Liberal Party
- In office 25 January 1982 – 15 February 1984
- Deputy: Cyril Rushton; Bill Hassell
- Preceded by: Sir Charles Court
- Succeeded by: Bill Hassell

Member of the Western Australian Legislative Assembly for Mount Lawley
- In office 31 March 1962 – 24 August 1984
- Preceded by: Edward Oldfield
- Succeeded by: George Cash

Member of the Western Australian Legislative Assembly for North Perth
- In office 21 March 1959 – 31 March 1962
- Preceded by: Stan Lapham
- Succeeded by: Seat abolished

Personal details
- Born: Raymond James O'Connor; 6 March 1926 Perth, Western Australia
- Died: 25 February 2013 (aged 86) Scarborough, Western Australia
- Party: Liberal (1957–1995, 2001–)
- Spouses: Beverley Vilma Lydiate (m. 1950, divorced) Vesna Frances Stampalia (née Dragicevich) (m. 1973)
- Children: 8
- Nickname: Rocky

Raymond James O'Connor (6 March 1926 – 25 February 2013) was an Australian politician who served as the premier of Western Australia from 25 January 1982 to 25 February 1983. He was a member of the Parliament of Western Australia from 1959 to 1984, and a minister in the governments of David Brand and Charles Court. O'Connor was born in Perth and attended schools in the Wheatbelt towns of Narrogin and York as well as St Patrick's Boys' School in Perth, leaving school at the age of 14. He competed in athletics and played Australian rules football as a teenager and young adult, including playing 14 matches for East Perth in the Western Australian National Football League. During World War II, he served in the Second Australian Imperial Force in New Britain and Bougainville.

O'Connor joined the Liberal Party in 1957 and was elected to the Western Australian Legislative Assembly in 1959. From 1965 to 1971, he was a minister in the Brand government. During this time, he served as the minister for railways and minister for transport, in which he oversaw the gauge standardisation project of the railway between Perth and Kalgoorlie. He became a minister again when Court was elected premier in 1974. He was police minister when the murder of Shirley Finn occurred in 1975, which remains unsolved but was likely done by a corrupt police officer.

O'Connor became deputy premier in 1980. When Court resigned as premier in January 1982, O'Connor was elected by his party to succeed him. The 1983 state election occurred 13 months later, in which the O'Connor government was defeated by Brian Burke and the Labor Party. The election was mainly fought on economic issues, particularly unemployment. O'Connor became opposition leader but was removed in a leadership spill in February 1984.

After resigning from Parliament in 1984, O'Connor started a consultancy business. He was made an Officer of the Order of Australia in 1989. During the WA Inc royal commission, it was determined that O'Connor had misappropriated a A$25,000 Bond Corporation cheque for himself. In May 1993, he was charged with stealing the cheque, and in February 1995, was sentenced to 18 months in prison. He was released on parole six months later. As a result of his conviction, his appointment as an Officer of the Order of Australia was terminated.

== Early life ==
Raymond James O'Connor was born on 6 March 1926 in Perth, Western Australia, as one of eight children of Annie née Moran and Alphonsus Maurice O'Connor, a police officer. He was of Irish and English descent and was brought up as a Catholic. O'Connor's father had an interest in politics, founding a branch of the Labor Party in Quairading. He left the Labor Party in the 1950s because he thought that it was "becoming a bit communistic" and was disillusioned with the leadership of H. V. Evatt. Ray O'Connor attended school in the Wheatbelt towns of Narrogin and York as well as St Patrick's Boys' School in Perth, leaving school at the age of 14.

O'Connor played sports as a teenager and young adult, winning state titles in athletics for hurdles and discus in 1943. He also played as a ruckman for the East Perth Football Club from 1946 to 1950, including playing 14 games in the Western Australian National Football League (WANFL) and winning the Prendergast Medal for best and fairest in the WANFL reserves in 1950.

From 1942 to 1944, O'Connor worked for farming machinery company Southern Cross Windmills. In World War II, he was involved with the Bougainville campaign. O'Connor enlisted with the Second Australian Imperial Force in April 1944. After doing jungle training in Canungra, Queensland, he embarked at Brisbane on 5 June 1945 and disembarked at Torokina on the island of Bougainville five days later, where he was transferred to the 61st Battalion. Bougainville was where he first met Charles Court, a senior officer and future premier of Western Australia. In September 1945, O'Connor was transferred to the 26th Battalion and moved from Bougainville to Rabaul, New Britain. In October 1945, he was transferred to the 13th Field Company, where he was promoted to corporal in February 1946. He embarked at Rabaul on 29 May 1946 and arrived back in Australia eight days later. His boxing experience in the army and his initials "ROC" led him to later gain the nickname "Rocky". After being discharged in January 1947, he studied accounting but did not finish. In 1955, he bought the Beehive Tearooms, a café in Forrest Place, Perth.

== Early political career ==
After encouragement from his father, O'Connor contested the Metropolitan Province of the Western Australian Legislative Council at the 1956 state election as an "independent Liberal" candidate, receiving 884 votes out of 15,159. He campaigned against the abolition of the Legislative Council, saying that it needed to be rejuvenated and have more young people elected to it. From 1957 to 1960, he was a used car sales proprietor in Inglewood, from 1957, he was a director of the Town and Country Terminating Building Society, and from 1964 to 1966, he was a director of the Town and Country Permanent Building Society. This garnered him interest from the Liberal Party, so Liberal MLC Keith Watson asked him to join the party in 1957 and contest the seat of North Perth in the Legislative Assembly, which was held by Labor's Stan Lapham. O'Connor won the seat off a 8.2 percent swing at the 1959 state election on 21 March, the same election in which David Brand became premier.

The electoral district of North Perth was abolished at the 1962 state election due to a redistribution, so O'Connor transferred to the adjacent electoral district of Mount Lawley. Before becoming a minister, O'Connor's interests were in police and housing. He often suggested changes to the Police Act to the party room, believing it was out of date. In March 1965, he became the honorary minister assisting the minister for railways and transport, Charles Court. Following the passage of the Constitution Acts Amendment Act 1965 in August that year, the ministry was expanded by two, allowing O'Connor to take over from Court as the minister for transport, and from February 1967, as the minister for railways as well.

As the minister for transport, O'Connor introduced compulsory seatbelts for passenger vehicles. He said that although he personally opposed compulsory seatbelts as an "infringement on individuals' rights", cabinet approved it so he had to introduce the legislation for it. In an interview in 1996, he said that compulsory seatbelts "turned out to be the right thing, no doubt about that". As the minister for railways, he oversaw the gauge standardisation project of the railway between Perth and Kalgoorlie, (Note: This consisted of the Eastern Railway from Perth to Northam and the Eastern Goldfields Railway from Northam to Kalgoorlie) which enabled people to travel to and from the eastern states by rail without changing trains. In February 1970, he travelled on the inaugural Indian Pacific train from Sydney to Perth, a journey only made possible by the gauge standardisation.

O'Connor had a reputation for being a successful gambler, having allegedly won A$100,000 betting on horse races once, although he denied this. He became involved in controversy when, during a debate on legislation to form the Totalisator Agency Board (TAB), he said that he had been offered a bribe to oppose the TAB. The chairman of the subsequent royal commission said he personally believed the bribe had been offered, but that could not be proven.

The Liberals lost the 1971 state election, and O'Connor moved with the rest of the party to the opposition benches. When Brand resigned from the Liberal Party's leadership in 1972, it was commonly accepted that Charles Court would succeed him. A group of MPs put O'Connor forward as a token candidate to make sure that Court did not take the leadership for granted. O'Connor indicated he would accept the nomination, but declined during the party room meeting, so Court was elected unopposed. O'Connor later said that he withdrew because his marriage had recently ended and he had claimed to be blackmailed. O'Connor contested the deputy leadership ballot but lost to Des O'Neil. Two years later, the Liberals won the 1974 state election, and formed a coalition with the National Country Party, led by Ray McPharlin. The Court–McPharlin ministry was formed on 8 April 1974, with O'Connor becoming the minister for transport again and the position of minister for railways being abolished. He was also the minister for police, the minister for traffic, and, from 1 May 1974, the minister for traffic safety. In May 1975, the National Country Party left the Coalition due to a policy dispute between McPharlin and Court. The National Country Party re-joined the Coalition later that month after McPharlin was replaced as leader by Dick Old. The ministry was reconstituted as the Court ministry, which resulted in the Liberal Party gaining the position of Deputy Premier instead of the National Party. O'Connor retained all his ministries except traffic safety.

As police minister, O'Connor set the blood alcohol limit for drivers at 0.08. He also formed the Road Traffic Authority, making a single body responsible for traffic and enforcement of infringements. In response to a growing number of labour strikes across the 1970s, he introduced an amendment to Section 54B of the Police Act in November 1976 so that a permit from the police commissioner was required for a gathering of more than three people in a public place. The amendment said that "reasonable grounds" were required for refusal but that there was no right to an appeal. This was heavily criticised as eroding civil liberties and was one of the most controversial actions of the Court government. Although O'Connor was the relevant minister, Court took responsibility for the act himself.

O'Connor was the police minister when the murder of well known socialite and brothel keeper Shirley Finn occurred on 22 June 1975. A coronial inquest was held between 2017 and 2019 which heard evidence that she was bribing the police to avoid having her brothel shut down, and that she threatened to blow the whistle on the persons involved unless she had her large tax bill paid. The inquest also heard evidence about O'Connor's relationship with Finn. There were longstanding rumours that O'Connor was in a secret relationship with Finn but O'Connor had long denied them. A witness alleged that Finn was murdered by policeman Don Hancock as a favour for O'Connor as he was supposedly one of the politicians Finn was going to expose. Another witness alleged that O'Connor was the person who actually carried out the murder, but the coroner ruled out his testimony due to several inconsistencies. The inquest ruled in 2020 that it was unable to determine who killed Finn. The Deputy State Coroner wrote:

Mr O'Connor was clearly a colourful character. There is evidence indicating that he may have been involved with Ms Finn, and weak circumstantial evidence suggesting that he may have procured Ms Finn's death. However, none of that evidence comes close to establishing his involvement to the applicable standard of proof.

The ministry was reconstituted on 10 March 1977 following the 1977 state election, which the Liberal Party won. O'Connor became the minister for works, minister for water supplies, and the minister for housing, all lower profile ministries than police. Although Court gave no explanation for this, he was reportedly tired of O'Connor's controversies regarding law and order. On 24 July 1978, Bill Grayden resigned from the ministry. O'Connor received his portfolios of labour and industry, consumer affairs, and immigration, first as an acting minister, then from 7 August as the minister. The ministry was reconstituted on 25 August. O'Connor lost his former ministries, and added fisheries and wildlife, and conservation and the environment, to those he had taken over from Grayden. O'Connor handled so many different ministries that he became known as the "minister for just about everything". As immigration minister, O'Connor often criticised the amount of Vietnamese immigrants coming into Western Australia, which sparked debate with federal immigration minister Michael MacKellar. O'Connor objected to immigrants coming to Australia without any check for criminal records or their health, and said that "we should give them money, petrol, turn their boat round and send them home".

Throughout Court's premiership, O'Connor was generally considered second in line, behind Deputy Premier Des O'Neil, to replace Court if he were to stand down as Liberal leader. After O'Neil unexpectedly retired at the 1980 state election, the Liberal MPs elected O'Connor as the party's deputy leader, thus making O'Connor the deputy premier, and Court's most likely successor. O'Connor retained the labour and industry, consumer affairs, and immigration portfolios, and gained regional administration and the north-west, and tourism. In February 1981, he was relieved of the portfolios of regional administration and the north-west and tourism. In anticipation of Court retiring soon, O'Connor would take Liberal MPs out to dinner, sometimes offering them ministries if they voted for him in a leadership election. According to upper house member Phil Lockyer, O'Connor "was a difficult bloke not to be friends with".

== Premier ==
Court announced on 18 December 1981 that he planned to resign on 25 January 1982. According to fellow MP Jim Clarko, speaking in an interview in 2012, O'Connor was the only option, with Bill Hassell, who only joined the ministry in 1980, the next best option. According to Tony Warton, Court's media advisor, his preferred successor was Peter Jones, a National Country Party minister. Court was concerned that O'Connor had promised too many MPs cabinet positions and that O'Connor was not able to handle portfolios with large budgets, although Court believed he did "reasonably well with railways" and thought that his personality would help him deal with people. Nevertheless, O'Connor won the leadership ballot unopposed, and Cyril Rushton was elected deputy leader.

O'Connor and his ministry were sworn in by Governor Richard Trowbridge on 25 January 1982. O'Connor chose to make himself treasurer, saying that it was a portfolio best handled by the premier. Out of the thirteen ministers in the previous Court ministry, ten were in the O'Connor ministry. The ministers who left were Court, Grayden, who was opposed to O'Connor becoming premier, and David Wordsworth. The new ministers were Ian Laurance, Barry MacKinnon and Bob Pike. Clarko and Richard Shalders were appointed assistant ministers before later being made ministers on 14 May 1982.

Soon after becoming premier, O'Connor sacked more than 200 workers at the Hospital Laundry Linen Service for striking and threatened to deregister their union. The workers were demanding a pay rise of $25 per week whereas the government was offering them an $11 per week pay rise. They were then told they could keep their jobs if they returned to work on 5 February. That day, they voted overwhelmingly against returning to work and they fought with police and picketed outside their workplace. By 3 pm that day, they accepted the $11 per week pay rise and returned to work. Later in February, the government approved a pay rise for nurses, who had been part of a prominent campaign against depressed wages a year previously. O'Connor was described in the Australian Journal of Politics and History as "anxious to assert that his administration would be compassionate and people-oriented".

Three by-elections occurred on 13 March 1982: the Nedlands by-election to replace Court, the Swan by-election to replace retiring Labor MLA Jack Skidmore, and the South Metropolitan by-election to replace retiring Labor MLC Howard Olney. The Nedlands by-election had around a 10 percent swing towards the Labor Party, but nevertheless, Court's son Richard Court was elected. In the Swan by-election, Gordon Hill retained the seat for Labor with a 3.6 percent swing to Labor, and in the South Metropolitan by-election, Garry Kelly retained the seat for Labor with a 4.3 percent swing to Labor. O'Connor blamed the poor results for the Liberals on the unpopular federal Fraser government. On 31 July, another by-election occurred for the North Province following the resignation of Liberal turned independent MLC Bill Withers. Tom Stephens of the Labor Party won with a 14 percent swing towards Labor.

By August, unemployment in Western Australia was rising faster than the other states. The state budget was released at the end of September 1982. It came with a freeze on all state taxes. On 30 December, O'Connor launched a job bank scheme, and appointed Hassell to the newly created ministry of employment in anticipation of the upcoming election being centred around job creation.

In January 1983, O'Connor announced the date of the 1983 state election would be 19 February. With the federal government unpopular, he asked for Prime Minister Malcolm Fraser to stay out of the campaign, saying "'we can run our own show and don't need any help or hindrance from Canberra". To O'Connor's dismay, Fraser set the date of the 1983 federal election for 4 March, two weeks after the state election. The Australian reported that O'Connor was "stunned and infuriated" at the announcement and that Fraser had not consulted with O'Connor. Bob Hawke, who grew up in Western Australia and was popular within the state, was elected leader of the Labor Party at the federal level, which helped the Labor Party in the state election. The Labor Party countered the O'Connor government's job bank by announcing its own plans for job creation, which involved the establishment of a jobs taskforce to create 25,000 new jobs over the next three years. The election resulted in a swing of between five and six percent away from the Liberal Party on a two-party-preferred basis, enough for the Labor Party to win 32 out of the 57 Legislative Assembly seats and win the election. Labor leader Brian Burke succeeded O'Connor as premier on 25 February 1983.

== Later life ==
O'Connor continued on as Liberal leader and leader of the opposition following his government's defeat. The Liberal and National parties decided to form a joint shadow ministry, and so the O'Connor shadow ministry was formed in mid-March with Liberal and National members. It consisted of all the ministers of the O'Connor government who were still in Parliament plus Grayden and Ian Thompson.

By early 1984, O'Connor was encountering pressure to resign as his media and parliamentary skills were no match for Burke's, and he had taken a six week family holiday to Europe at the end of 1983. On 10 February, Thompson, a formerly staunch supporter of O'Connor, resigned from the shadow ministry and called for him to resign as leader. A meeting of the 39 Liberal MPs was called for 15 February, at which Thompson proposed a motion that the leader and deputy leader positions be declared vacant. The motion was passed, and so a leadership spill occurred among the MPs. O'Connor, along with Hassell, MacKinnon, and Rushton contested the spill. Hassell was elected leader and MacKinnon was elected deputy leader. Afterwards, O'Connor stated that he would resign from politics by the end of the year. The ballot was the first leadership spill in the state Liberal Party's history.

O'Connor resigned from Parliament on 24 August 1984. He was succeeded as the member for Mount Lawley by George Cash. Following that, O'Connor formed a consultancy called Ray O'Connor Consultancy with Laurie Connell. O'Connor owned one third of the company and Connell owned two thirds. The company received a yearly $25,000 retainer each from Connell, Bond Corporation, Multiplex and another company, and O'Connor was additionally paid $500 per week. The company did work for the Burke government and for Connell, including lobbying local governments to approve developments.

In the 1989 Australia Day Honours, O'Connor was appointed an Officer of the Order of Australia for "service to the government and politics and to the Western Australian Parliament".

=== WA Inc ===
Burke resigned as premier in February 1988 and was replaced by Peter Dowding, who himself resigned in February 1990 amid unpopularity due to the WA Inc scandal, a series of controversial government investments and deals with private enterprise dating back to the Burke government. The Labor Party replaced him with Carmen Lawrence, who initially resisted calls for a royal commission into WA Inc. After months of pressure, she announced in November 1990 that the royal commission would go ahead. To reduce the pressure on the Labor Party, Lawrence included investigating the Court and O'Connor governments in the commission's terms of reference as well as the Burke and Dowding governments.

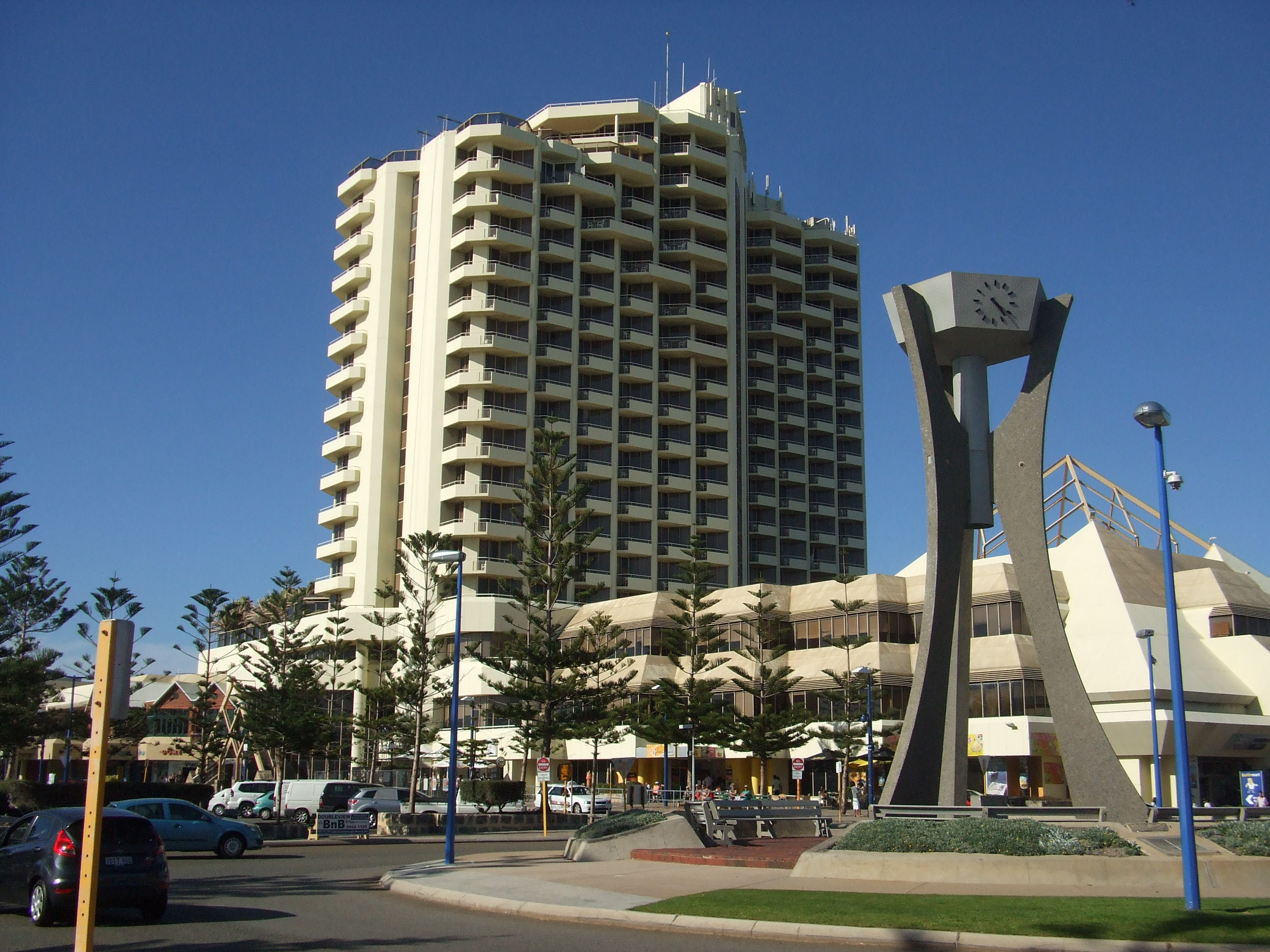
The Observation City hotel in Scarborough

While giving evidence to the commission, Terry Burke, a former member of parliament and the brother of Brian Burke, said that O'Connor had told him in 1987 that he was the middleman between Bond Corporation and City of Stirling councillors in a bribery scandal. It was alleged that Bond Corporation was bribing Stirling councillors in 1984 to approve the Observation City hotel development in Scarborough. The commission was played a recording of the conversation secretly taped by Terry Burke where O'Connor said he was given a $30,000 bribe by former Bond Corporation managing director Peter Beckwith on behalf of subsidiary Austmark International. O'Connor said he then passed the bribe to George Cash, who was a Stirling councillor at the time. O'Connor gave evidence on 28 February 1992, where he admitted to having the conversation with Burke but said that he was lying so that he could find out information from the Burke government that would be useful to the Liberal Party. He admitted to lobbying Stirling councillors on behalf of Austmark but said that no bribes took place. On 30 January 1992, Brian Burke testified that O'Connor had originally told him the story, but thought that O'Connor was trying to set him up, so he got O'Connor to retell the story to Terry Burke, who used a tape recorder to record the conversation. Neither of the Burke's told the police as they said they had no evidence.

Cash, by now a senior opposition MP, commenced defamation action against O'Connor soon after his appearance at the commission. In February 1992, O'Connor resigned from the Liberal Party amid speculation that the party would kick him out. In the same month, the commission began investigating O'Connor's finances, suspecting him of having stolen a $25,000 cheque from Bond Corporation in April 1984. The cheque was made out to a "Mt Lawley campaign fund" and recorded by Bond Corporation as a political donation. The investigation found a $25,000 deposit into O'Connor's bank account at the same time, which O'Connor was unable to explain. By that point, the record of the transaction had been destroyed which prevented investigators from determining where the money came from just based on the bank's records. Unrelated to the cheque, the investigation found that O'Connor had not paid tax on the $500 per week he received from Connell for his consultancy business.

The commission handed down its first report on 20 October 1992, which made adverse findings against O'Connor. The commission found that the Bond Corporation cheque was given to O'Connor with the intention of using the money to bribe the Stirling council, but O'Connor kept the money for himself and that no bribery took place. The report stated that "O'Connor was given every opportunity to explain the source of the sum deposited to the credit of his account on 19 April 1984, but was unable to do so in any believable way. Mr O'Connor misappropriated for his own purposes the monies which were the proceeds of the Bond Corporation cheque."

O'Connor was charged on 11 May 1993 with one count of stealing (Note: O'Connor was initially charged with stealing the $25,000 cheque from the Liberal Party. Prosecutors amended the charge at a November 1993 preliminary hearing to stealing from Bond Corporation, as there was insufficient evidence the cheque had ever reached the Liberal Party.) and two counts of criminal defamation relating to his statements saying that George Cash accepted a bribe. He pleaded not guilty to all charges and was released on bail. In November 1993, he had a preliminary hearing which determined there was enough evidence for O'Connor to go on trial. The trial for the stealing charge began on 13 February 1995 in the District Court. Evidence was given that O'Connor had a $98,000 overdraft and a $27,000 tax bill, which prosecutors alleged was O'Connor's motive for stealing the cheque. The jury gave a unanimous verdict that O'Connor was guilty on 17 February. This made him the first conservative MP to be convicted of offences relating to WA Inc, after Brian Burke and David Parker from the Labor Party had been convicted earlier. On 21 February, O'Connor was sentenced to 18 months in prison. He served his sentence at the minimum-security Wooroloo Prison Farm. In June 1995, his trial for the defamation charges occurred, in which he was found guilty of both counts. He was given an 18-month good behaviour bond. He was released on parole on 20 August 1995 after serving six months of his sentence. As a result of his conviction, his appointment as an Officer of the Order of Australia was terminated on 18 October 1995.

After 2001, O'Connor was reinstated as a member of the Liberal Party when party leader Colin Barnett put forward a motion that his membership be restored. Barnett said "as leader I moved at a state council meeting that Ray's membership be restored on the grounds that he had made a great contribution to the party, he had made an error and done his time, that we should put that behind us, move on, and readmit him."

== Personal life and death ==
O'Connor married his first wife Beverley Vilma Lydiate, with whom he had four daughters and four sons, at St Francis Xavier's Church in East Perth on 17 June 1950. They divorced around 1972. His second marriage, to Vesna Frances Stampalia (née Dragicevich), occurred on 14 March 1973. O'Connor was the uncle of West Coast Eagles coach Ron Alexander and the grandfather of Adelaide Crows player Ronin O'Connor.

O'Connor died on 25 February 2013 in a nursing home in Scarborough, aged 86. His funeral occurred on 7 March 2013 at the Our Lady of the Rosary Church in Woodlands and he was cremated at Karrakatta Cemetery.

== See also ==
- Electoral results for the district of North Perth
- Electoral results for the district of Mount Lawley
- List of heads of government who were later imprisoned
- List of Australian politicians convicted of crimes

== Notes ==
Parliament of Western Australia
Preceded by Stan Lapham	Member for North Perth; 21 March 1959 – 31 March 1962	Abolished
Preceded by Edward Oldfield	Member for Mount Lawley; 31 March 1962 – 24 August 1984	Succeeded by George Cash
Political offices
Preceded by Sir Charles Court	Minister for Transport; 17 August 1965 – 3 March 1971	Succeeded by Jerry Dolan
Preceded by Sir Charles Court	Minister for Railways; 16 February 1967 – 3 March 1971	Succeeded by Ron Bertram
Preceded by Ron Bertram	Minister for Transport; 8 April 1974 – 10 March 1977	Succeeded by David Wordsworth
Preceded by Ron Thompson	Minister for Police; 8 April 1974 – 10 March 1977	Succeeded by Sir Des O'Neil as the Minister for Police and Traffic
New title	Minister for Traffic; 8 April 1974 – 10 March 1977	Succeeded by Sir Des O'Neil as the Minister for Police and Traffic
Preceded by Sir Des O'Neil	Deputy Premier of Western Australia; 5 March 1980 – 25 January 1982	Succeeded by Cyril Rushton
Preceded by Sir Charles Court	Premier of Western Australia; 25 January 1982 – 25 February 1983	Succeeded by Brian Burke
Preceded by Brian Burke	Leader of the Opposition; 25 February 1983 – 15 February 1984	Succeeded by Bill Hassell
Party political offices
Preceded by Sir Des O'Neil	Deputy Leader of the Western Australian Liberal Party; 5 March 1980 – 25 January 1982	Succeeded by Cyril Rushton
Preceded by Sir Charles Court	Leader of the Western Australian Liberal Party; 25 January 1982 – 15 February 1984	Succeeded by Bill Hassell
