= Frank Paolino =

Western Australian politician

Frank Paolino MLA

Member of the Western Australian Legislative Assembly for Mount Lawley
- Incumbent
- Assumed office 8 March 2025
- Preceded by: Simon Millman

Personal details
- Party: Labor
- Website: paolino.com.au

Frank Paolino is an Australian politician from the Labor Party who is member of the Western Australian Legislative Assembly for the electoral district of Mount Lawley. He won his seat at the 2025 Western Australian state election.

Paolino is of Italian Australian descent and has served in Italian diplomatic missions, including as part of the Italian delegation to the 2014 G20 Summit in Brisbane.

Western Australian Legislative Assembly
Preceded by Simon Millman	Member for Mount Lawley; 2025–present	Incumbent
