= Graham Burkett =

Australian politician

Member of the Western Australian Legislative Assembly for Scarborough
- In office 19 February 1983 – 4 February 1989
- Preceded by: Ray Young
- Succeeded by: George Strickland

Personal details
- Born: 9 November 1936 Maylands, Western Australia, Australia
- Died: 29 July 2014 (aged 77) City Beach, Western Australia, Australia
- Party: Labor

Graham John Burkett (9 November 1936 – 29 July 2014) was an Australian politician who served as a Labor Party member of the Legislative Assembly of Western Australia from 1983 to 1989, representing the seat of Scarborough.

== Early life and politics ==
Born in Perth, Burkett worked as a bank officer and small business owner before entering politics. He was elected to the City of Stirling council in 1973, and served as mayor from 1979 to 1983. At the 1983 state election, Burkett contested the seat of Scarborough for the Labor Party, defeating the sitting Liberal member, Ray Young. He increased his margin at the 1986 election, and afterward was elected deputy speaker to Mike Barnett, having previously served as deputy government whip and deputy chairman of committees. However, a redistribution prior to the 1989 election narrowed his margin in Scarborough, and he subsequently suffered a large swing, losing the seat to the Liberals' George Strickland.

== Later life ==
After leaving parliament, Burkett worked as a DEA agent for Department of Planning and a community liaison officer for Main Roads. He was elected to the Town of Cambridge council in 1997, and served until 2004. From 2001 to 2004, Burkett additionally worked as chief of staff to Nick Griffiths, the Minister for Government Enterprises in the Gallop government. A later investigation by the Corruption and Crime Commission (CCC) found that he had taken bribes while in the position, and in February 2006 he was sentenced to 14 months in jail for corruption. The CCC also found that Burkett had links to various organised crime figures.

== See also ==
- List of Australian politicians convicted of crimes
- List of mayors of Stirling

Parliament of Western Australia
Preceded by Ray Young	Member for Scarborough; 1983–1989	Succeeded by George Strickland
