= Michael Sutherland =

Australian politician

The Honourable Michael Sutherland OAM

29th Speaker of the Western Australian Legislative Assembly
- In office 11 April 2013 – 11 March 2017
- Preceded by: Grant Woodhams
- Succeeded by: Peter Watson

Member of the Western Australian Parliament for Mount Lawley
- In office 6 September 2008 – 11 March 2017
- Preceded by: Constituency re-established
- Succeeded by: Simon Millman

Personal details
- Born: Michael William Sutherland; 23 October 1954 (age 71) Johannesburg, Transvaal, South Africa
- Party: Liberal Party
- Other political affiliations: United Party; Progressive Federal Party
- Education: University of the Witwatersrand; University of South Africa; University of Sydney
- Profession: Lawyer

Michael William Sutherland OAM (born 23 October 1954) is an Australian politician who was the Speaker of the Western Australian Legislative Assembly. He was a Liberal member of the Western Australian Legislative Assembly from September 2008 to March 2017, representing the electorate of Mount Lawley. Before state politics, Sutherland was a City of Perth Councillor from 1995 to 2009 and served as deputy mayor for five years. Sutherland retired from the City of Perth Council in early 2009. Between 1982 and 1987 Sutherland served as a Johannesburg city councillor.

== Early life ==
Sutherland was born to William and Alice Sutherland in Johannesburg, South Africa. Sutherland's parents met whilst his father was serving as a Warrant Officer in the South African Army in Egypt during the Second World War. His father was of Scottish ancestry, whilst his mother belonged to the Lebanese Christian community. His mother later married William and migrated to South Africa.

Sutherland describes his upbringing as cosmopolitan. His mother spoke French, Arabic, English and some Italian and Greek, and he grew in a city of diverse nationalities, religions and backgrounds.

After matriculating from The Hill High School where he was head boy, Sutherland undertook national service in the South African army, and then proceeded to complete a Bachelor of Arts at the Witwatersrand University, where he majored in history and international relations. He commenced teaching in 1977 for a period of five years. Whilst teaching, he studied as an external student at the University of South Africa, graduating with a teacher's diploma and law degree. He was admitted as a solicitor and notary public in South Africa in 1983.

== Entry into politics and public service ==
From the early 1970s, Sutherland was active in the United Party, the then main parliamentary opposition to the ruling National Party.

In 1982 he was elected to the Johannesburg City Council as a member of the Progressive Federal Party, which by then had become the main parliamentary opposition party. The Johannesburg City Council was a large metropolitan council with 47 councillors and 600,000 residents.

He migrated to Australia in 1987.

== Career in Australia ==
Sutherland arrived in Sydney in 1987. He soon qualified as an Australian lawyer through the University of Sydney. He then moved to Perth in 1988 where he practised law until 2008 when he was elected as the Member for Mount Lawley, the position he held until 2017.

On his resignation from City of Perth Council in 2009, he was made a freeman of the City of Perth, an honour awarded to council members who have served at least three consecutive elections, who have made an outstanding contribution to the community and who have consistently displayed commendable conduct.

Western Australian Legislative Assembly
New seat	Member for Mount Lawley; 2008–2017	Succeeded by Simon Millman
Preceded by Grant Woodhams	Speaker of the Western Australian Legislative Assembly; 2013–2017	Succeeded by Peter Watson
