= Electoral district of Innaloo =

Former state electoral district of Western Australia

Innaloo Western Australia—Legislative Assembly
- State: Western Australia
- Dates current: 1996–2005
- Namesake: Innaloo
- Area: 24 km^{2} (9.3 sq mi)

Innaloo was an electoral district of the Legislative Assembly in the Australian state of Western Australia from 1996 to 2005 that had 24,311 electors on roll.

The district was based in the northern suburbs of Perth, and named for the suburb of Innaloo. It also included all or parts of the suburbs of Balcatta, Doubleview, Gwelup, Karrinyup, Osborne Park, Scarborough, Stirling and Trigg.

== History ==
Innaloo was created in the 1994 redistribution, essentially replacing the abolished seat of Scarborough and incorporating part of the former Glendalough, and was first contested at the 1996 state election. Hence, Innaloo was contested, and won, by incumbent Scarborough MP George Strickland.

Innaloo, as with Scarborough before it, was a seat generally seen as a Liberal seat, but winnable by Labor at elections where Labor received well over 50% of the overall two-party preferred votes. This occurred in 1983 and 1986, and again in 2001.

Innaloo was abolished two terms after its creation, taking effect at the 2005 election. Its territory was divided between the existing seats of Carine and Churchlands, and the new seat of Balcatta. Sitting MP John Quigley opted to contest the new seat of Mindarie in the outer northern suburbs of Perth.

== Members for Innaloo ==
Member	Party	Term
George Strickland	Liberal	1996–2001
John Quigley	Labor	2001–2005
