= Stuart Aubrey =

Australian politician (born 1990)

Stuart Aubrey MLA

Member of the Western Australian Legislative Assembly for Scarborough
- Incumbent
- Assumed office 13 March 2021
- Preceded by: Liza Harvey

Personal details
- Born: 28 December 1990 (age 35) Pinjarra, Western Australia, Australia
- Party: Labor (since 2011)
- Education: Frederick Irwin Anglican School
- Occupation: Electrician; Politician
- Website: www.stuartaubrey.com.au

Stuart Neil Aubrey (born 28 December 1990) is an Australian politician and former electrician, who was elected as a Labor member for Scarborough in the Western Australian Legislative Assembly at the 2021 state election.

== Early life and education ==
Stuart Aubrey was born on 28 December 1990 in Pinjarra, Western Australia, to Ronald Edward Aubrey, a mathematics teacher, and Christine Anne Aubrey, a disability support worker. He attended North Mandurah Primary School and Frederick Irwin Anglican School, completing up to year 11. He later did a Certificate IV in Adult Preparation Studies, which is equivalent to year 12, at Tuart College.

== Career ==
Aubrey worked for almost seven years as a fly-in fly-out (FIFO) electrician in the resources industry. He joined the Labor party in 2011, when he was 21. He has also worked as a Labor staffer, including for Roger Cook and John Carey.

== Politics ==
=== 2021 election campaign ===
In the 2021 state election, Aubrey contested the seat of Scarborough as a Labor candidate, going up against former Liberal Party leader Liza Harvey. Scarborough was watched closely during the campaign, as it was held by the formal Liberal leader, and it was a possible seat for Labor to win. On 13 March 2021, Aubrey won the seat of Scarborough with a 16.2% swing towards him.

=== 2025 election campaign ===
In 2025, Aubrey was re-elected to retain the seat of Scarborough despite a -7.4% swing against him.

=== Political views ===
Aubrey is one of six Labor MPs in the current state parliament that is not factionally aligned as of 2021.

== Personal life ==
Aubrey volunteers at the Scarborough Surf Life Saving Club. He is an atheist and is one of six openly LGBT MPs elected to parliament after the 2021 state election.

Western Australian Legislative Assembly
Preceded by Liza Harvey	Member for Scarborough; 2021–present	Incumbent
