= Electoral district of Mount Lawley =

State electoral district of Western Australia

Mount Lawley Western Australia—Legislative Assembly
- Interactive map of electoral district boundaries from the 2025 state election
- State: Western Australia
- Dates current: 1950–1989; 2008–present
- MP: Frank Paolino
- Party: Labor
- Namesake: Mount Lawley
- Electors: 29,695 (2021)
- Area: 18 km^{2} (6.9 sq mi)
- Demographic: Metropolitan
Electorates around Mount Lawley:
Balcatta	Morley	Morley
Balcatta	Mount Lawley	Maylands
Perth	Perth	Victoria Park

Mount Lawley is an electorate in the state of Western Australia. Mount Lawley is named for the inner north-eastern Perth suburb of Mount Lawley, which falls within its borders.

The seat was created at the 2007 redistribution from parts of Yokine and Perth, and has a long history in an earlier incarnation which existed from 1950 until 1989 as a reasonably safe Liberal Party seat which was held for 22 years by Ray O'Connor, who served as Premier in 1982–1983, although is now a marginal seat. Before the abolition of Legislative Council Regions, it fell within the Electoral region of East Metropolitan.

As well as Mount Lawley, the suburbs of Yokine, Menora and Coolbinia are part of the district, as are sections of Dianella and Inglewood. Mount Lawley is bounded by Morley Drive, The Strand, Walter Road West, Eighth Avenue, Carrington Street, Central Avenue, the Swan River foreshore, Summers Street, Lord Street, Walcott Street and Wanneroo Road.

== History ==
The original seat of Mount Lawley was created at the 1948 redistribution, at which three new metropolitan electorates were created to replace former northern and agricultural seats in Parliament. Its first member was elected at the 1950 election, and it was always a safe seat for the Liberal Party. At the redistribution, the neighbouring seat of North Perth became a Labor seat with booths from the abolished Perth electorate, so Arthur Abbott, the Liberal member for North Perth since 1939, contested and won Mount Lawley. He was ultimately defeated in the 1956 election by the Liberal member for Maylands, Edward Oldfield, who had resigned from the Liberal Party to contest the election. In the 1962 election, following another redistribution, Oldfield returned to Maylands, whilst North Perth MLA Ray O'Connor won in Mount Lawley. He was to serve the district for 22 years, and the State as a minister in the Court government and ultimately as Premier of Western Australia from 25 January 1982 until 19 February 1983. He resigned his seat the following year, and George Cash won the resulting by-election. The seat was abolished in the 1988 redistribution and divided between Maylands, Dianella and Perth.

The seat was recreated in the 2007 redistribution on similar boundaries to its original incarnation. The seat of Yokine, which covered much of the original Mount Lawley's area, was held by Liberal minister Dr Kim Hames until the 2001 election, when he was defeated by the Labor candidate and former Assistant Police Commissioner Bob Kucera. After it became clear Kucera did not have Premier Alan Carpenter's support, Kucera did not contest Labor preselection for the 2008 election, and journalist Karen Brown won the nomination unopposed. In June 2008, Kucera resigned from the Labor Party and expressed an intention to contest either Nollamara or Mount Lawley as an independent, though he ultimately contested neither. The 2008 state election saw Brown defeated by Liberal candidate Michael Sutherland.

== Members for Mount Lawley ==
Mount Lawley (1950–1989)
Member	Party	Term
Arthur Abbott	Liberal Country League	1950–1956
Edward Oldfield	Independent Liberal	1956–1962
Ray O'Connor	Liberal Country League	1962–1968
Ray O'Connor	Liberal	1968–1984
George Cash	Liberal	1984–1989
Mount Lawley (2008–present)
Member	Party	Term
Michael Sutherland	Liberal	2008–2017
Simon Millman	Labor	2017–2025
Frank Paolino	Labor	2025–present

== Election results ==
2025 Western Australian state election: Mount Lawley
Party	Candidate	Votes	%	±%
Labor	Frank Paolino	11,516	42.7	−16.5
Liberal	Michelle Sutherland	8,780	32.6	+9.4
Greens	Lucy Nicol	4,346	16.1	+4.8
Legalise Cannabis	Leo Treasure	878	3.3	+3.3
One Nation	Graeme Morrison	746	2.8	+2.0
Christians	Nathaly Key-Elliss	494	1.8	+0.2
Shooters, Fishers, Farmers	S. L. Singleton	204	0.8	+0.8
Total formal votes		26,964	96.4	−0.1
Informal votes		1,000	3.6	+0.1
Turnout		27,964	88.3	+3.6
Two-party-preferred result
Labor	Frank Paolino	16,352	60.7	−11.2
Liberal	Michelle Sutherland	10,607	39.3	+11.2
Labor hold		Swing	−11.2	
