= List of mayors of Stirling =

The City of Stirling in Perth, Western Australia was originally established on 12 February 1871 as the Perth Road Board with a chairman and councillors under the Roads Boards Act 1871. With the passage of the Local Government Act 1960, all road boards became Shires with a shire president and councillors effective 1 July 1961. The Shire of Perth was declared a city and renamed Stirling on 24 January 1971.

The method of electing the Mayor was changed in 2017, after a referendum on the issue at the October 2017 council election. Starting in 2019, the Mayor was elected at elections by residents, as opposed to the previous system, where the Mayor is elected by councillors at a meeting following each election.

== Perth Road Board ==
Chairman	Term start	Term end	Ref
Michael Smith	7 February 1871	2 December 1872	
Edmund Birch	2 December 1872	2 March 1874	
Michael Smith	7 April 1874	8 January 1877	
Richard Hardey	8 January 1877	23 February 1881	
George Shenton	23 February 1881	18 January 1882	
Richard Hardey	18 January 1882	14 January 1883	
Michael Smith	14 January 1883	5 January 1884	
David Harwood	10 January 1885	8 January 1887	
Richard Hardey	8 January 1887	7 January 1896	
Harry Williams	7 January 1896	1 December 1896	
Richard Hardey	5 January 1897	12 February 1910 (died)	
Charles Chappell	14 February 1910	24 April 1917	
Edgar Hamer	24 April 1917	31 March 1931	
John Scaddan	31 March 1931	21 November 1934 (died)	
John Tyler	29 November 1934	2 May 1935	
Harry Shearn	2 May 1935	27 August 1936	
John Orr	27 August 1936	21 October 1937	
William Abbett	21 October 1937	26 April 1949	
William Bardon	26 April 1949	21 April 1953	
Maurice Edgar Hamer	21 April 1953	1 May 1956	
Robert Bandy	1 May 1956	29 April 1958	
Samuel Spence	29 April 1958	22 June 1959	
Russell West	22 April 1959	21 June 1959 (died)	
Herbert R. Robinson	24 June 1959	30 June 1961	

== Shire of Perth ==
President	Term start	Term end	Ref
Herbert R. Robinson	1 July 1961	17 September 1963	
Manuel Starke	17 September 1963	24 January 1971	

== City of Stirling ==
Mayor	Term start	Term end	Ref
Manuel Starke	24 January 1971	24 May 1971	
Neil Hawkins	24 May 1971	24 May 1974	
Ron Stone	24 May 1974	26 May 1975	
Alma Venville	26 May 1975	7 June 1977	
Andy Luketina	7 June 1977	26 May 1979	
Graham Burkett	26 May 1979	9 May 1983	
Joe Camilleri	9 May 1983	7 May 1984	
Terry Tyzack	7 May 1984	5 May 1986	
George Strickland	5 May 1986	7 May 1988	
Jim McNamara	7 May 1988	May 1989	
Adam Spagnolo	8 May 1989	May 1990	
James Satchell	7 May 1990	1991	
Jim McNamara	1991	1993	
Adam Spagnolo	1993	1995	
Trevor Clarey	1995	1997	
Tony Vallelonga	1997	2005	
Terry Tyzack	2005	2007	
David Boothman	2007	22 October 2013	
Giovanni Italiano	22 October 2013	24 October 2017	
Mark Irwin	24 October 2017	present	
