= George Strickland (politician) =

Australian politician (1942–2019)

The Honourable George Strickland AM

26th Speaker of the Western Australian Legislative Assembly
- In office 6 March 1997 – 10 February 2001
- Preceded by: Jim Clarko
- Succeeded by: Fred Riebeling

Member of the Western Australian Legislative Assembly for Scarborough
- In office 4 February 1989 – 14 December 1996
- Preceded by: Graham Burkett
- Succeeded by: Constituency abolished

Member of the Western Australian Legislative Assembly for Innaloo
- In office 14 December 1996 – 10 February 2001
- Preceded by: Constituency created
- Succeeded by: John Quigley

Personal details
- Born: 3 October 1942 Elsternwick, Victoria
- Died: 23 June 2019 (aged 76) Gwelup, Western Australia
- Party: Liberal
- Spouse: Helen Elizabeth Ball (m. 1962)
- Children: 3 (1 son; 2 daughters)
- Education: Western Australian Institute of Technology
- Profession: Teacher, politician

George Joseph Strickland AM (3 October 1942 – 23 June 2019) was an Australian politician.

He was a schoolteacher before entering politics. In 1989, he was elected to the Western Australian Legislative Assembly as the Liberal member for Scarborough; he moved to Innaloo in 1996. After the Liberal win in the 1993 election he was appointed Chairman of Committees and Deputy Speaker, rising to the Speakership in 1997. He retired from politics in 2001.

== Early life and education ==
George Strickland was born in Elsternwick, Victoria to professional engineer George Strickland and Ellen Margaret Sykes, moving to Western Australia in 1946. He attended Forrest State Primary School (now South Perth Primary School) from 1949 to 1952 and then Wesley College from 1953 to 1959.

Strickland graduated from the Western Australian Institute of Technology (now part of Curtin University) with a Bachelor of Applied Science in physics, and received a Diploma of Education from the Western Australian College of Education in 1974.

He was a Justice of the Peace from 1989 to 2010.

== Career ==
=== Teaching ===
Strickland first began teaching manual arts at Scarborough Senior High School from 1962 until 1973. Then in 1975 he taught maths at Lockridge Senior High School before finally moving to Hampton Senior High School in 1985 as head of mathematics until 1989.

=== Politics ===
George Strickland first moved into politics as a councillor for the City of Stirling from May 1981, becoming deputy mayor from 1984, and mayor of the City of Stirling from 1986 to 1990. He retired from local government in May 1990. On 23 February 2000 he was made the seventh Honorary Freeman of the Municipality for his service to the City of Stirling.

In April 1988 Strickland joined the Liberal Party, and was elected to the Western Australian Legislative Assembly as member for Scarborough, after this seat was abolished at the 1996 election he moved to the new seat of Innaloo. In opposition he was the Shadow Minister for Community Services, Multicultural and Ethnic Affairs and Youth between 1990 and 1993. However Strickland did not occupy any ministerial portfolio under the Court–Cowan ministry, instead being appointed Deputy Speaker of the Legislative Assembly and Chairman of Committees from 17 June 1993 to 14 November 1996 before becoming Speaker of the Legislative Assembly from 6 March 1997 to 10 February 2001 when he retired as the outgoing member for Innaloo at the 2001 election.

== Personal life ==
In May 1962 Strickland married Helen Elizabeth Ball at St Peter's Anglican Church, Victoria Park. He has 3 children; 1 son and 2 daughters with Ball. He was awarded a Centenary of Federation Medal in 2003. On 26 January 2007 he was awarded a Member of the Order of Australia (AM) for his services to the Western Australian parliament and his role in local government.

Strickland was a keen stamp collector and a member of the Stirling Philatelic Society since 1978, becoming part of its committee in 2001. He was also a member of various sports clubs around Scarborough, Trigg, Hamersley and North Beach.

On 23 June 2019 George Strickland died in Gwelup at the age of 76, he is buried at Pinnaroo Valley Memorial Park in Padbury.

Western Australian Legislative Assembly
Preceded by Graham Burkett	Member for Scarborough; 1989–1996	Abolished
New seat	Member for Innaloo; 1996–2001	Succeeded by John Quigley
Preceded by Jim Clarko	Speaker of the Western Australian Legislative Assembly; 1997–2001	Succeeded by Fred Riebeling
