= John Quigley (politician) =

Australian lawyer and politician

Attorney-General of Western Australia
- In office 17 March 2017 – 19 March 2025
- Premier: Mark McGowan; Roger Cook
- Preceded by: Michael Mischin
- Succeeded by: Tony Buti

Deputy Speaker of the Legislative Assembly of Western Australia
- In office 1 May 2001 – 6 September 2008
- Premier: Geoff Gallop; Alan Carpenter
- Preceded by: Chris Baker
- Succeeded by: Wendy Duncan

Member of the Western Australian Parliament for Butler
- In office 9 March 2013 – 5 February 2025
- Preceded by: Constituency created
- Succeeded by: Lorna Clarke

Member of the Western Australian Parliament for Mindarie
- In office 26 February 2005 – 9 March 2013
- Preceded by: Constituency created
- Succeeded by: Constituency abolished

Member of the Western Australian Parliament for Innaloo
- In office 10 February 2001 – 26 February 2005
- Preceded by: George Strickland
- Succeeded by: Constituency abolished

Personal details
- Born: John Robert Quigley; 1 December 1948 (age 77) Perth, Western Australia, Australia
- Party: Labor Party
- Spouses: Mary Ellen (m. 1983; div. 1994) Darryl Wookey (m. 1994; div. 1997) Michelle Stronach (m. 2004; div. 2021)
- Children: 5
- Education: Aquinas College; University of Western Australia (LLB; 1974)
- Occupation: Trade union lawyer (Police Union of Western Australia); Trade union delegate (Australian Council of Trade Unions)
- Profession: Barrister; Politician
- Website: www.johnquigley.com.au

John Robert Quigley (born 1 December 1948) is an Australian barrister, solicitor and politician in Western Australia. A member of the ALP, he served as a member of the Western Australian Legislative Assembly from the 2001 election until 2025, initially as the Member for Innaloo (2001–2005) until that seat's abolition in an electoral redistribution, then as the Member for Mindarie (2005–2013) until that seat's abolition in an electoral redistribution and is currently the Member for Butler. As of March 2022, he is the state's Attorney-General and Minister for Electoral Affairs in the second McGowan ministry after holding the position of Attorney General and Minister for Commerce in the McGowan Ministry.

== Early life ==
He was born on 1 December 1948 in Perth, Western Australia, and was educated at Aquinas College, Perth. Dropping out of high school at 16, Quigley became a stockman at Mardathuna Station near Carnarvon before returning to Perth to work as a truck driver for Brambles. Inspired by a book on US president Abraham Lincoln, he decided to pursue a career in law and enrol at the University of Western Australia.

== Career ==
=== Law ===
Quigley was the lawyer for the Western Australian Police Union for 25 years. In 1983, he represented officers at the inquest into the death of John Pat, a 16-year-old Aboriginal boy. He became an honorary life member of the union in 2000 before entering state parliament in 2001.

=== Politics ===
In 2007, his life membership of the Western Australian Police Union was withdrawn after his parliamentary attack on police involved with the Andrew Mallard case, where he named a former undercover policeman who had a role in Mallard's unjust conviction. He planned to melt down his life membership badge, have it made into a tiepin with the words Veritas Vincit— "Truth Conquers", the motto of the school he attended—and present it to Mallard.

In 2008, Quigley and two other MPs were cleared by the Corruption and Crime Commission in relation to allegations of dealings with lobbyist Brian Burke. Burke approached the MPs in order to launch a parliamentary enquiry that would favour one of his associates.

In 2011, he was accused of bringing the legal profession into disrepute, a charge stemming from his campaign to expose the wrongful jailing of Andrew Mallard for murder, to which he replied "...if you take on corrupt police you will be pursued and they will try and destroy you." In November 2011 Quigley was fined $3000 by the State Administrative Tribunal for professional misconduct, again in relation to his successful campaign against police in the Mallard case.

As Minister for Electoral Affairs since the 2021 election, Quigley has been overseeing potential reforms to the voting system for the Western Australian Legislative Council. In April 2021, he formed a panel to examine potential reform of that voting system. The panel was led by former Governor of Western Australia Malcolm McCusker, and consisted of four electoral and constitutional law experts.

=== Attorney-General of Western Australia ===
From April 2009 to March 2017, Quigley was the Shadow Attorney-General. He became the WA Attorney-General on 16 March 2017. In February 2024, Quigley announced he would step down as Attorney-General and as the MP for Butler at the 2025 state election.

Western Australian Legislative Assembly
Preceded by George Strickland	Member for Innaloo; 2001–2005	Succeeded by Seat abolished
Preceded by New seat	Member for Mindarie; 2005–2013	Succeeded by Seat abolished
Preceded by New seat	Member for Butler; 2013–2025	Succeeded by Lorna Clarke
Political offices
Preceded by Michael Mischin	Attorney-General of Western Australia; 2017–2025	Succeeded by Tony Buti
